= Colbie Caillat discography =

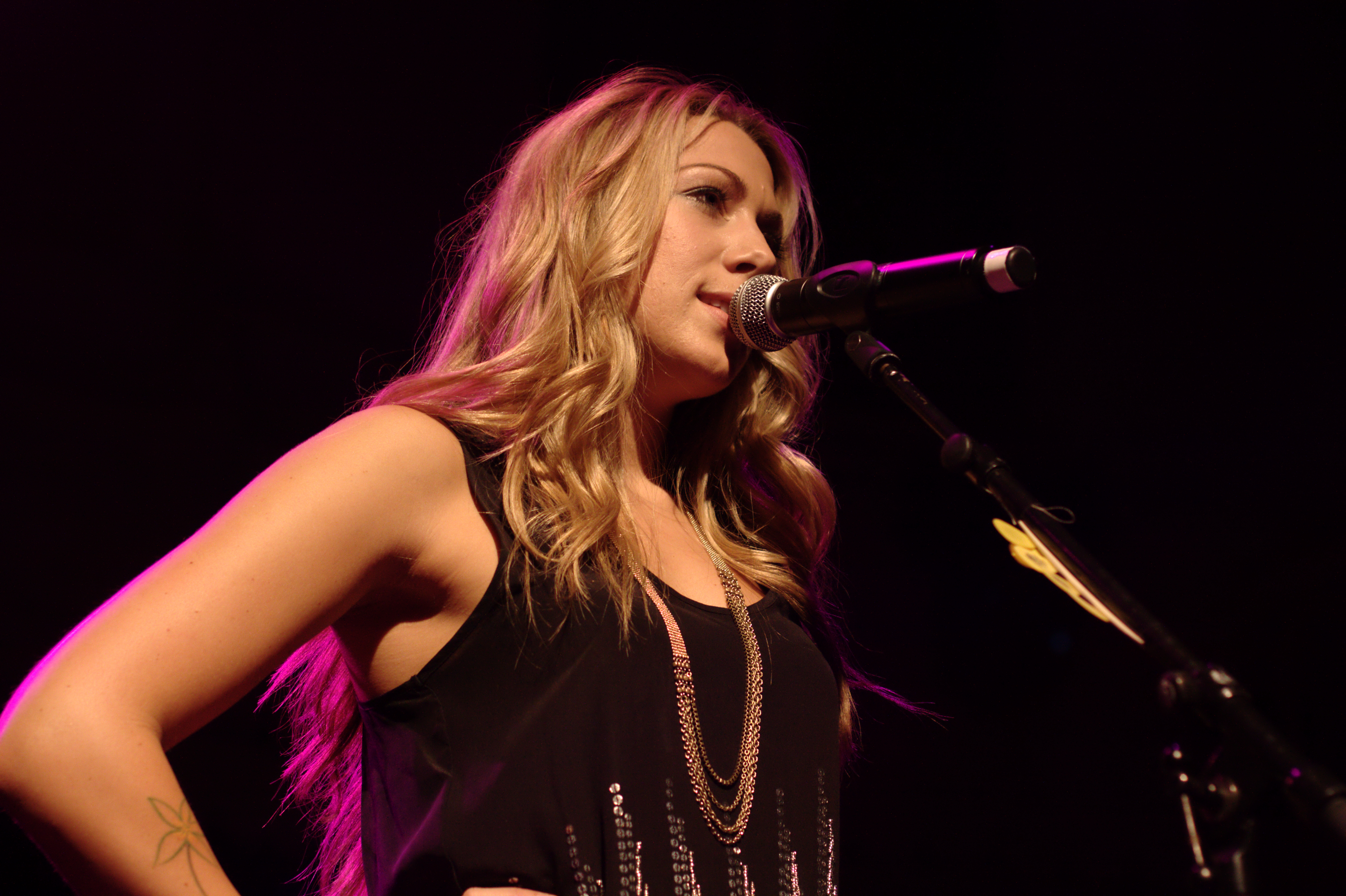
- Colbie Caillat performing in Paradiso, Amsterdam on July 22, 2009
- Studio albums: 8
- Extended plays: 7
- Compilation albums: 1
- Singles: 22
- Music videos: 22
- Promotional singles: 10

The American singer Colbie Caillat has released eight studio albums, seven extended plays, one compilation album, 22 singles (including six as a featured artist), 22 music videos and other album appearances and songwriting credits. Caillat rose to fame through social networking website Myspace. At that time, she was the number-one unsigned artist of her genre. After signing with Universal Republic, she released debut album in July 2007, Coco has sold 2,060,000 copies in the United States and is certified 3× Platinum. In August 2009, she released Breakthrough, her second album which became her first album to debut at number one on Billboard 200. It has been certified Platinum by RIAA. In July 2011, she released her third studio album, All of You. In October 2012 she released her first Christmas album, Christmas in the Sand. Caillat sold 11 million albums and 25 million singles worldwide. Caillat released her first country music album, Along the Way, on October 6, 2023.

== Albums ==
=== Studio albums ===
Title	Album details	Peak chart positions										Certifications
Title	Album details	US	AUS	AUT	BEL	CAN	FRA	GER	NL	NZ	SWI	Certifications
Coco	Released: July 17, 2007; Formats: CD, digital download; Label: Universal Republic	5	13	26	22	12	15	15	11	12	23	RIAA: 3× Platinum; BPI: Silver; ARIA: Gold; BVMI: Gold; SNEP: Gold; IFPI SWI: Gold
Breakthrough	Released: August 25, 2009; Formats: CD, digital download; Label: Universal Republic	1	59	10	37	5	23	9	24	31	10	RIAA: Platinum
All of You	Released: July 12, 2011; Formats: CD, vinyl, digital download; Label: Universal Republic	6	49	24	78	10	63	11	55	—	7	
Christmas in the Sand	Released: October 23, 2012; Formats: CD, vinyl, digital download; Label: Universal Republic	41	—	—	—	—	—	—	—	—	—	
Gypsy Heart	Released: September 30, 2014; Formats: CD, digital download; Label: Republic	17	—	—	154	—	—	—	—	—	62	
The Malibu Sessions	Released: October 7, 2016; Format: CD, vinyl, digital download; Label: PlummyLou	35	—	—	—	—	—	—	—	—	—	
Along the Way	Released: October 6, 2023; Format: CD, vinyl, digital download; Label: Blue Jean Baby	—	—	—	—	—	—	—	—	—	85	
This Time Around	Released: August 29, 2025; Label: Blue Jean Baby	—	—	—	—	—	—	—	—	—	—	
"—" denotes a recording that did not chart.

=== Compilation albums ===
Title	Album details
Coco / Breakthrough	Released: December 4, 2012; Format: CD, digital download; Label: Universal Republic

== Extended plays ==
Title	Details	Peak chart positions
Title	Details	US
Live in Berlin	Released: September 28, 2007; Format: Digital download; Label: Universal Republic	—
Coco: Summer Sessions	Released: November 11, 2008; Format: Digital download; Label: Universal Republic	176
Napster Session	Released: December 2, 2008; Format: Digital download; Label: Universal Republic	—
Breakthrough: Acoustic Session	Released: January 11, 2009; Format: Digital download; Label: Universal Republic	—
iTunes Session	Released: January 26, 2010; Format: Digital download; Label: Universal Republic	72
iTunes Live	Released: February 14, 2012; Format: Digital download; Label: Universal Republic	160
Gypsy Heart (Side A)	Released: June 9, 2014; Format: CD, digital download; Label: Republic	32
"—" denotes releases that did not chart.

== Singles ==
=== As lead artist ===
Title	Year	Peak chart positions										Certifications	Album
Title	Year	US	US Adult	AUS	AUT	BEL	CAN	GER	NL	NZ	SWI	Certifications	Album
"Bubbly"	2007	5	1	1	6	2	2	10	3	6	11	RIAA: 6× Platinum; ARIA: 6× Platinum; BEA: Gold; BPI: Gold; RMNZ: Gold	Coco
"Mistletoe"	2007	75	—	—	—	—	56	—	—	—	—		Non-album single (Note: At the time of its release, "Mistletoe" was not included on an album. However, a re-recorded version was later included on Caillat's 2012 Christmas album, Christmas in the Sand.)
"Realize"	2008	20	6	—	—	—	37	—	61	—	—	RIAA: 2× Platinum	Coco
"The Little Things"	2008	— (Note: "The Little Things" did not enter the Billboard Hot 100, but peaked at number 7 on the Bubbling Under Hot 100 Singles chart.)	16	—	60	58	—	51	41	—	—		Coco
"Lucky" (with Jason Mraz)	2009	48	8	—	44	55	56	22	8	—	21	RIAA: 4× Platinum; BPI: Silver; MC: Gold	We Sing. We Dance. We Steal Things.
"Fallin' for You"	2009	12	2	63	13	62	28	16	62	31	21	RIAA: 2× Platinum	Breakthrough
"I Never Told You"	2010	48	3	—	—	—	—	—	—	—	—	RIAA: 2× Platinum	Breakthrough
"I Do"	2011	23	7	—	30	64	—	33	—	—	—	RIAA: Gold	All of You
"Brighter Than the Sun"	2011	47	2	94	31	—	65	44	—	—	55	RIAA: Platinum	All of You
"Favorite Song" (featuring Common)	2012	—	21	—	—	—	—	—	—	—	—		All of You
"Christmas in the Sand"	2012	—	—	—	—	—	—	—	—	—	—		Christmas in the Sand
"Hold On"	2013	— (Note: "Hold On" did not enter the Billboard Hot 100, but peaked at number 4 on the Bubbling Under Hot 100 Singles chart.)	13	—	—	—	67	55	—	25	—		Gypsy Heart
"Try"	2014	55	6	67	—	65	56	—	—	—	—	RIAA: Platinum	Gypsy Heart
"Goldmine"	2016	—	37	—	—	—	—	—	—	—	—		The Malibu Sessions
"Worth It"	2023	—	—	—	—	—	—	—	—	—	—		Along the Way
"Pretend"	2023	—	—	—	—	—	—	—	—	—	—		Along the Way
"Wide Open"	2023	—	—	—	—	—	—	—	—	—	—		Along the Way
"I'll Be Here" (with Sheryl Crow)	2023	—	—	—	—	—	—	—	—	—	—		Along the Way
"If You Love Me Let Me Go" (with Russell Dickerson)	2025	—	—	—	—	—	—	—	—	—	—		This Time Around
"Realize" (with Mitchell Tenpenny)	2025	—	—	—	—	—	—	—	—	—	—		This Time Around
"If There's Not a Song About It" (with Gary Barlow)	2025	—	—	—	—	—	—	—	—	—	—		Non-album single
"Can't Say No" (with Ryan Hurd)	2025	—	—	—	—	—	—	—	—	—	—		This Time Around
"—" denotes a single that did not chart.

=== As featured artist ===
Title	Year	Peak chart positions			Album
Title	Year	US Country Airplay	AUT	GER	Album
"You" (Schiller featuring Colbie Caillat)	2008	—	64	19	Sehnsucht
"If the Moon Fell Down" (Chase Coy featuring Colbie Caillat)	2010	—	—	—	Picturesque
"So in Love" (Ted Lennon featuring Jack Johnson and Colbie Caillat)	2012	—	—	—	The Taste of Time
"Puzzle Pieces" (Justin Young featuring Colbie Caillat)	2012	—	—	—	Makai
"Please, Please Stay" (Lucky Uke featuring Colbie Caillat)	2012	—	—	—	Non-album single
"Watch the World End" (Trace Adkins featuring Colbie Caillat)	2013	57	—	—	Love Will...
"—" denotes a recording that did not chart.

=== Promotional singles ===
Single	Year	Peak chart positions	Album
Single	Year	US	Album
"Tailor Made"	2007	—	Coco
"Midnight Bottle"	2008	—	Coco
"Somethin' Special"	2008	98	Coco
"What If"	2010	77	Letters to Juliet
"It's My Party"	2011	—	Non-album single
"We Both Know" (featuring Gavin DeGraw)	2013	—	Safe Haven
"Just Like That"	2014	—	Gypsy Heart
"—" denotes a recording that did not chart.

== Other charted songs ==
Title	Year	Peak chart positions				Certifications	Album
Title	Year	US	US A/C	US Holiday	CAN	Certifications	Album
"Dreams Collide"	2007	96	—	—	—		Coco
"Breathe" (Taylor Swift featuring Colbie Caillat)	2008	87	—	—	—	RIAA: Gold	Fearless
"Have Yourself a Merry Little Christmas"	2009	—	12	—	—		A Very Special Christmas 7
"The Christmas Song" (featuring Justin Young)	2012	—	14	—	—		Christmas in the Sand
"Merry Christmas, Baby" (featuring Brad Paisley)	2012	—	—	30	—		Christmas in the Sand
"Baby, It's Cold Outside" (featuring Gavin DeGraw)	2012	—	—	12	—		Christmas in the Sand
"Every Day Is Christmas" (featuring Jason Reeves)	2012	—	—	4	—		Christmas in the Sand
"Breathe (Taylor's Version)" (Taylor Swift featuring Colbie Caillat)	2021	— (Note: "Breathe (Taylor's Version)" did not enter the Billboard Hot 100, but peaked at number eight on the Bubbling Under Hot 100 Singles chart.)	—	—	78		Fearless (Taylor's Version)
"—" denotes a recording that did not chart.

== Other appearances ==
Title	Year	Other artist(s)	Album
"Kiss the Girl"	2008	—N/a	Disneymania 6
"Breathe"	2008	Taylor Swift	Fearless
"Hoy Me Voy"	2008	Juanes	La Vida... Es Un Ratico
"Here Comes the Sun" (version 1)	2009	—N/a	Imagine That
"Here Comes the Sun" (version 2)	2009	Mikal Blue	Imagine That
"Have Yourself A Merry Little Christmas"	2009	—N/a	A Very Special Christmas Vol.7
"I Was Made for Sunny Days"	2010	The Weepies	Be My Thrill
"Maria"	2010	—N/a	Levi's Pioneer Sessions
"BulletProof Vest"	2010	Dave Stewart	The Blackbird Diaries
"Entre Tus Alas"	2011	Camila	Dejarte de Amar
"Fine By Me"	2012	Andy Grammer	Live from L.A.
"All About You"	2012	Jerrod Niemann	Free the Music
"Have I Told You Lately That I Love You"	2012	Keith Harkin	Keith Harkin
"When the Darkness Comes"	2013	—N/a	The Mortal Instruments: City of Bones
"Please, Please Stay"	2014	Matt Laurent	Matt Laurent
"My Heart"	2018	Toni Braxton	Sex & Cigarettes
"Breathe (Taylor's Version)"	2021	Taylor Swift	Fearless (Taylor's Version)

== Music videos ==
Title	Year	Director	Notes
"Bubbly"	2007	Liz Friedlander	
"Realize"	2008	Philip Andelman	
"The Little Things"	2008	Darren Doane	
"The Little Things" (US version)	2008	Josh Karchmer	
"Kiss the Girl"	2008	Declan Whitebloom	
"You"	2008	Marcus Sternberg	Schiller's music video; featured video
"Lucky"	2009	Darren Doane	
"Fallin' for You"	2009	The Malloys	
"If the Moon Fell Down"	2010	Jessica Bailis	Chase Coy's music video; featured video
"I Never Told You"	2010	Roman White	
"25 Days of Christmas"	2010	—N/a	
"I Do"	2011	Ethan Lader	
"Brighter Than the Sun"	2011	Emil Nava	
"No Lies"	2011	Nathanael Matanick	Jason Reeves's music video; featured video
"Favorite Song"	2012	Jay Martin	
"Fine By Me"	2012	Andy Grammer	Andy Grammer's music video; featured video
"Puzzle Pieces"	2012	—N/a	Justin Young's music video; featured video
"Christmas in the Sand"	2012	Roman White	
"We Both Know"	2013	Roman White	Gavin DeGraw's music video; featured video
"Watch the World End"	2013	Emily Hawkins	Trace Adkins's music video; featured video
"Hold On"	2014	Cameron Duddy and Harper Smith	
"Try"	2014	Roman White	
