= Ryan Tedder discography =

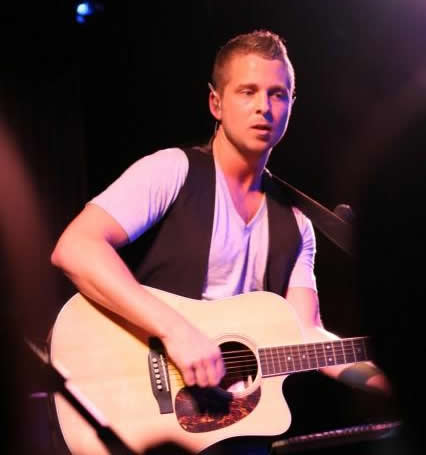
Ryan Tedder performing

This is the full discography of American singer, songwriter and record producer Ryan Tedder.

== As performer ==
=== Singles ===
==== As lead artist ====
List of singles, with selected chart positions and certifications, showing year released and album name
| Title | Year | Album |
|---|---|---|
| "Right Where I'm Supposed to Be (Official Song of the Special Olympic World Games, Abu Dhabi, 2019)" (Ryan Tedder with Avril Lavigne, Luis Fonsi, Hussain Al Jassmi, Assala Nasri and Tamer Hosny) | 2019 | Non-album single |

==== As featured artist ====
List of singles, with selected chart positions and certifications, showing year released and album name
| Title | Year | Peak chart positions | | | | | | | | | | Certifications | Album |
| Title | Year | US | AUS | AUT | CAN | GER | IRL | NLD | NZ | SWI | UK | Certifications | Album |
|---|---|---|---|---|---|---|---|---|---|---|---|---|---|
| "Good in Goodbye" (Wynter Gordon featuring Ryan Tedder) | 2003 | — | — | — | — | — | — | — | — | — | — | | Non-album single |
| "She Tried" (Bubba Sparxxx featuring Ryan Tedder) | 2003 | — | — | — | — | — | — | — | — | — | — | | Non-album single |
| "Rocketeer" (Far East Movement featuring Ryan Tedder) | 2003 | 7 | 14 | — | 22 | 40 | — | 47 | 4 | — | 14 | ARIA: Platinum; RMNZ: Gold | Free Wired |
| "Save Some" (Glacier Hiking featuring Ryan Tedder) | 2011 | — | — | — | — | — | — | — | — | — | — | | The Color By Number EP |
| "The Fighter" (Gym Class Heroes featuring Ryan Tedder) | 2011 | 25 | 7 | — | 53 | — | 15 | — | 4 | — | 44 | RIAA: Platinum; RIANZ: Gold; ARIA: Platinum | The Papercut Chronicles II |
| "Calling (Lose My Mind)" (Sebastian Ingrosso and Alesso featuring Ryan Tedder) | 2012 | — | — | — | — | — | 47 | 38 | — | 71 | 19 | GLF: 3× Platinum; ARIA: Gold; FIMI: Gold | Until Now |
| "The Missing" (Cassius featuring Ryan Tedder and Jaw) | 2016 | — | — | — | — | — | — | — | — | — | — | | Ibifornia |
| "One Day" (Logic featuring Ryan Tedder) | 2018 | 80 | — | — | 92 | — | — | — | — | — | 99 | | YSIV |
| "Learn to Love Me" (David Solomon featuring Ryan Tedder) | 2021 | — | — | — | — | — | — | — | — | — | — | | Non-album single |
| "With Your Love" (Illenium featuring Ryan Tedder) | 2025 | — | — | — | — | — | — | — | — | — | — | | Odyssey |
"—" denotes a title that did not chart, or was not released in that territory.

=== Guest appearances ===
| Title | Year | Album |
|---|---|---|
| "Switch On" (Paul Oakenfold featuring Ryan Tedder) | 2006 | A Lively Mind |
| "The Way I Feel" (Paul Oakenfold featuring Ryan Tedder) | 2006 | A Lively Mind |
| "Not Over" (Paul Oakenfold featuring Ryan Tedder) | 2006 | A Lively Mind |
| "Thrill Is Gone" (Baby Bash featuring Ryan Tedder) | 2007 | Cyclone |
| "Is This All" (Vanness Wu featuring Ryan Tedder) | 2011 | C'est La "V" |
| "Never Let You Go" (B.o.B featuring Ryan Tedder) | 2012 | Strange Clouds |
| "Lost at Sea" (Zedd featuring Ryan Tedder) | 2012 | Clarity |
| "S.T.O.P." (David Guetta featuring Ryan Tedder) | 2014 | Listen |
| "Scars" (Alesso featuring Ryan Tedder) | 2015 | Forever |

== Songwriting discography ==
Discography
| Year | Artist | Album | Song | Co-written with |
|---|---|---|---|---|
| 2005 | t.A.T.u. | Dangerous and Moving | "Divine" | Martin Kierszenbaum |
| 2006 | Alias | Step Up | "Attention Please" | |
| 2006 | Earth, Wind and Fire | Step Up | "'Til Dawn" | Peter Cor, Bernard Taylor |
| 2006 | Josh Henderson and Ben Davis | Step Up | "Philosophy" | Justin Trugman |
| 2006 | Jamie Scott | Step Up | "Made" | |
| 2006 | YoungBloodZ | Step Up | "Imma Shine" | Sean Paul Joseph, Jeffrey Grigsby, Michael Cook, Rick de Varona |
| 2006 | Nikki Flores | —N/a | "Strike" | Nikki Flores, Denise Pearson |
| 2006 | Frankie J | Priceless | "Dance" | Francisco Javier Bautista, Michael Caren |
| 2006 | Frankie J | Priceless | "If He Can't Be" | Francisco Javier Bautista, Steve Stevens, Michael Caren, William Broad |
| 2006 | Natalie | Everything New | "Love You So" | Natalie Alvardo, Richard Raymond Finch, Harry Wayne Casey |
| 2007 | Baby Bash | Cyclone | "Dip with You" | Ronald Bryant, Paula DeAnda, Erick Coomes, Angel Noa, Justin Trugman |
| 2007 | Baby Bash | Cyclone | "Thrill Is Gone" | Ronald Bryant |
| 2007 | Hilary Duff | Dignity | "Gypsy Woman" | Hilary Duff, Haylie Duff |
| 2007 | Blake Lewis | A.D.D | "Break Anotha" | Blake Lewis, Louis Biancaniello, Sam Watters |
| 2007 | Blake Lewis | A.D.D | "Gots to Get Her" | Blake Lewis, Irving Berlin, Steph Jones, Kristal Oliver |
| 2007 | Blake Lewis | A.D.D | "Know My Name" | Blake Lewis, Wasalu Jaco, Josh Hoge |
| 2007 | Blake Lewis | A.D.D | "Surrender" | Evan Bogart |
| 2007 | Blake Lewis | A.D.D | "Hate 2 Love Her" | Blake Lewis |
| 2007 | Blake Lewis | A.D.D | "End of the World" | Blake Lewis, Troy Johnson, Sam Watters, Louis Biancaniello, Jordan Omley, Michael J. Mani |
| 2007 | Blake Lewis | A.D.D | "I Got U" | Blake Lewis |
| 2007 | Leona Lewis | Spirit | "Bleeding Love" | Jesse McCartney |
| 2007 | Leona Lewis | Spirit | "Take a Bow" | Sam Watters, Louis Biancaniello, Wayne Wilkins |
| 2007 | Jennifer Lopez | Brave | "Do It Well" | Leonard Caston, Jr., Frank Wilson, Anita Poree |
| 2007 | OneRepublic | Dreaming Out Loud | "Say (All I Need)" | Drew Brown, Zach Filkins, Eddie Fisher, Brent Kutzle |
| 2007 | OneRepublic | Dreaming Out Loud | "Mercy" | Drew Brown |
| 2007 | OneRepublic | Dreaming Out Loud | "Stop and Stare" | Drew Brown Zach Filkins, Eddie Fisher, Tim Myers |
| 2007 | OneRepublic | Dreaming Out Loud | "Apologize" | |
| 2007 | OneRepublic | Dreaming Out Loud | "Goodbye, Apathy" | |
| 2007 | OneRepublic | Dreaming Out Loud | "All Fall Down" | Drew Brown, Zach Filkins, Eddie Fisher, Brent Kutzle |
| 2007 | OneRepublic | Dreaming Out Loud | "Tyrant" | Drew Brown, Zach Filkins |
| 2007 | OneRepublic | Dreaming Out Loud | "Prodigal" | Jerrod Bettis, Drew Brown, Zach Filkins, Tim Myers |
| 2007 | OneRepublic | Dreaming Out Loud | "Won't Stop" | Drew Brown, Zach Filkins, Eddie Fisher, Brent Kutzle |
| 2007 | OneRepublic | Dreaming Out Loud | "All We Are" | Tim Myers |
| 2007 | OneRepublic | Dreaming Out Loud | "Someone to Save You" | Eddie Fisher, Tim Myers |
| 2007 | OneRepublic | Dreaming Out Loud | "Come Home" | |
| 2007 | Ashley Tisdale | Headstrong | "He Said She Said" | Evan Bogart, J.R. Rotem |
| 2007 | Shayne Ward | Breathless | "Gonna Be Alright" | |
| 2007 | Shayne Ward | Breathless | "Tell Him" | Justin Trugman, Kotecha, Ashraf Jannusi |
| 2008 | Clay Aiken | On My Way Here | "On My Way Here" | Hunter Davis, Chris Faulk |
| 2008 | Dima Bilan | Believe | "Amnesia" | |
| 2008 | Natasha Bedingfield | Pocketful of Sunshine | "Love Like This" | Natasha Bedingfield, Louis Biancaniello, Rico Love, Sam Watters, Wayne Wilkins, Kisean Anderson |
| 2008 | Beyoncé | I Am... Sasha Fierce | "Halo" | Beyoncé Knowles, Evan Bogart |
| 2008 | Hilary Duff | Best of Hilary Duff | "Reach Out" | Martin Gore, Evan Bogart, Mika Guillory |
| 2008 | Hilary Duff | Best of Hilary Duff | "Holiday" | Hilary Duff, Haylie Duff |
| 2008 | Jada | —N/a | "If You Wanna" | Chantelle Paige |
| 2008 | NLT | —N/a | "Karma" | Marques Houston, Evan Bogart |
| 2008 | Monrose | I Am | "Strike the Match" | Deborah "Soshy" Epstein |
| 2008 | Stanfour | Wild Life | "How Does It Feel" | Alexander Rethwisch, Konstantin Rethwisch |
| 2008 | Varsity Fanclub | —N/a | "Future Love" | |
| 2009 | Backstreet Boys | This Is Us | "Contradiction" (demo)* | Howie Dorough |
| 2009 | Backstreet Boys | This Is Us | "Undone" | Troy Johnson, Josh Hoge |
| 2009 | Dima Bilan | Believe | "Amnesia" | Jesse McCartney, James David Washington |
| 2009 | Kelly Clarkson | All I Ever Wanted | "Already Gone" | Kelly Clarkson |
| 2009 | Kelly Clarkson | All I Ever Wanted | "If I Can't Have You" | Kelly Clarkson |
| 2009 | Kelly Clarkson | All I Ever Wanted | "Save You" | Aimée Proal |
| 2009 | Kelly Clarkson | All I Ever Wanted | "Impossible" | Kelly Clarkson |
| 2009 | Kelly Clarkson | All I Ever Wanted | "Tip of My Tongue" | Kelly Clarkson |
| 2009 | Chris Cornell | Scream | "Never Far Away" | Chris Cornell, Timothy Mosley, Jerome Harmon, James Washington, Ezekiel Lewis, Balewa Muhammed |
| 2009 | Chris Cornell | Scream | "Long Gone" | Chris Cornell, Timothy Mosley, Kerome Harmon, Ezekiel Lewis, Jerome Harmon, Patrick Smith, Blewa Muhammed |
| 2009 | Chris Cornell | Scream | "Enemy" | Chris Cornell, Timothy Mosley, Jerome Harmon, James Washington, Ezekiel Lewis, Balewa Muhammed, Johnkenun Spivery |
| 2009 | Chris Cornell | Scream | "Other Side of Town" | Chris Cornell, Timothy Mosley, Jerome Harmon, James Washington |
| 2009 | Chris Cornell | Scream | "Climbing Up the Walls" | Chris Cornell, Timothy Mosley, Jerome Harmon, James Washington |
| 2009 | Chris Cornell | Scream | "Ordinary Girl" | Chris Cornell, Timothy Mosley, Jerome Harmon, James Washington |
| 2009 | Chris Cornell | Scream | "Do Me Wrong" | Chris Cornell, Timothy Mosley, Jerome Harmon, James Fauntleroy, Evan Bogart |
| 2009 | Chris Cornell | Scream | "Stop Me" | Chris Cornell, Timothy Mosley, Jerome Harmon, James Fauntleroy, Evan Bogart |
| 2009 | Kristinia DeBarge | Exposed | "Future Love" | Evan Bogart |
| 2009 | Kristinia DeBarge | Exposed | "Speak Up" | Evan Bogart |
| 2009 | Esmée Denters | Outta Here | "Victim" | Esmée Denters |
| 2009 | Adam Lambert | For Your Entertainment | "Sleepwalker" | Aimee Mayo, Chris Lindsey |
| 2009 | Adam Lambert | For Your Entertainment | "Master Plan" | David Jost, Dave Roth, Pat Benzner |
| 2009 | Blake Lewis | Heartbreak on Vinyl | "Love or Torture" | Blake Lewis |
| 2009 | Leona Lewis | Echo | "Happy" | Leona Lewis, Evan Bogart |
| 2009 | Leona Lewis | Echo | "You Don't Care" | Leona Lewis |
| 2009 | Leona Lewis | Echo | "Lost Then Found" | Leona Lewis, Jess Cates, Lindy Robbins, Dan Muckala |
| 2009 | James Morrison | Songs for You, Truths for Me | "Please Don't Stop the Rain" | James Morrison |
| 2009 | OneRepublic | Waking Up | "Made for You" | Brent Kutzle |
| 2009 | OneRepublic | Waking Up | "All the Right Moves" | |
| 2009 | OneRepublic | Waking Up | "Secrets" | |
| 2009 | OneRepublic | Waking Up | "Everybody Loves Me" | Brent Kutzle |
| 2009 | OneRepublic | Waking Up | "Missing Persons 1 and 2" | |
| 2009 | OneRepublic | Waking Up | "Good Life" | Brent Kutzle, Noel Zancanella, Eddie Fisher |
| 2009 | OneRepublic | Waking Up | "All This Time" | Brent Kutzle |
| 2009 | OneRepublic | Waking Up | "Fear" | |
| 2009 | OneRepublic | Waking Up | "Waking Up" | Drew Brown |
| 2009 | OneRepublic | Waking Up | "Marchin On" | |
| 2009 | OneRepublic | Waking Up | "Lullaby" | Brent Kutzle |
| 2009 | The Pussycat Dolls | —N/a | "Whatever Happens" | |
| 2009 | Jordin Sparks | Battlefield | "Battlefield" | Wayne Wilkins, Sam Watters, Louis Biancaniello |
| 2009 | Train | Save Me, San Francisco | "This Ain't Goodbye" | Pat Monahan |
| 2009 | Westlife | Where We Are | "Shadows" | AJ McLean |
| 2009 | Westlife | Where We Are | "Where We Are" | Savan Kotecha |
| 2010 | Natasha Bedingfield | Strip Me | "Strip Me" | Natasha Bedingfield, Wayne Wilkins |
| 2010 | Natasha Bedingfield | Strip Me | "Neon Lights" | Natasha Bedingfield, Wayne Wilkins |
| 2010 | James Blunt | Some Kind of Trouble | "So Far Gone" | James Blunt, Steve Robson |
| 2010 | James Blunt | Some Kind of Trouble | "Stay the Night" | James Blunt, Steve Robson |
| 2010 | Burnham | Almost Famous | "Automatic" | Jerrod Michael Bettis, Nicholas Michael Furlong |
| 2010 | Burnham | Almost Famous | "Catch Me If You Can" | Noel Zancanella |
| 2010 | Charice | Charice | "I Did It for You" | Niclas Molinder, Joacim Persson, Johan Alkenäs |
| 2010 | Sky Ferreira | —N/a | "Obsession" | Sky Ferreira, Jerrod Bettis, Justin Franks |
| 2010 | Nikki Flores | —N/a | "City Lights" | Nikki Flores, Noel Zancanella, Steve Perry, Neal Schon |
| 2010 | BC Jean | —N/a | "Just a Guy" | Brittany Jean Carlson |
| 2010 | Tamar Kaprelian | Sinner or a Saint | "Sinner or a Saint" | Brent Kutzle, Tamar Kaprelian |
| 2010 | Rascal Flatts | Nothing Like This | "Tonight Tonight" | Gary LeVox, Chris Lindsey, Aimee Mayo |
| 2010 | Show Lo | Rashomon | "Luó Shēng Mén" | Chen Zhenchuan, Troy "Radio" Johnson |
| 2010 | Stanfour featuring Esmée Denters | Rise and Fall | "Life Without You" | |
| 2010 | Sons of Sylvia | Revelations | "Love Left to Lose" | Ashley Clark |
| 2010 | Sugababes | Sweet 7 | "Thank You for the Heartbreak" | Mikkel Eriksen, Tor Erik Hermansen, Claude Kelly |
| 2010 | Stan Walker | From the Inside Out | "Unbroken" | |
| 2011 | Adele | 21 | "Rumour Has It" | Adele Adkins |
| 2011 | Adele | 21 | "Turning Tables" | Adele Adkins |
| 2011 | Big Time Rush | Elevate | "Music Sounds Better with U" | Big Time Rush, Thomas Bangalter, Benjamin Cohen, Brent Kutzle, Eric Bellinger, Frank Musker, Noel Zancanella, Alain Quême, Dominic Bugatti |
| 2011 | Cobra Starship | Night Shades | "#1Nite (One Night)" | Gabe Saporta, Brent Kutzle |
| 2011 | Javier Colon | Come Through For You | "1,000 Lights" | Brent Kutzle, Noel Zancanella, Leona Lewis |
| 2011 | David Cook | This Loud Morning | "The Last Goodbye" | David Cook |
| 2011 | Gavin DeGraw | Sweeter | "Not Over You" | Gavin DeGraw |
| 2011 | Gavin DeGraw | Sweeter | "Sweeter" | Gavin DeGraw |
| 2011 | Thomas Fiss | RT - EP | "Speak Up" | |
| 2011 | Thomas Fiss | RT - EP | "Gravity" | |
| 2011 | Thomas Fiss | RT - EP | "You Don't Care" | |
| 2011 | Thomas Fiss | RT - EP | "Ice" | |
| 2011 | Thomas Fiss | RT - EP | "Shadows" | |
| 2011 | Kay | —N/a | "My Name Is Kay" | My Name Is Kay, Evan Bogart, Noel Zancanella |
| 2011 | Demi Lovato featuring Dev | Unbroken | "Who's That Boy" | Noel Zancanella, Devin Tailes |
| 2011 | Jennifer Hudson | I Remember Me | "I Remember Me" | Jennifer Hudson |
| 2011 | Sean Paul featuring Alexis Jordan | Tomahawk Technique | "Got 2 Luv U" | Sean Paul Henriques, Mikkel Eriksen, Tor Erik Hermansen |
| 2011 | Jordin Sparks | —N/a | "I Am Woman" | Ali Pierre, Dean Josiah |
| 2011 | Jordin Sparks | —N/a | "The World I Knew" | Josiah Dean |
| 2011 | Vanness Wu | C'est La V | "Is This All" | |
| 2012 | B.o.B | Strange Clouds | "So Good" | Bobby Simmons, Brent Kutzle |
| 2012 | B.o.B | Strange Clouds | "Never Let You Go" | Bobby Simmons, Noel Zancanella |
| 2012 | B.o.B | Strange Clouds | "Castles" | Bobby Simmons, Jr., Noel Zancanella, Tremaine Neverson |
| 2012 | Colbie Caillat | All of You | "Brighter Than the Sun" | Colbie Caillat |
| 2012 | Colbie Caillat | All of You | "Favorite Song" | Colbie Caillat, Lonnie Rashid Lynn, Jr. |
| 2012 | Altiyan Childs | —N/a | "Ordinary Man" | Nicholas Furlong |
| 2012 | K'naan | Country, God or the Girl | "Better" | Noel Zancanella, Brent Kutzle, Keinan Abdi Warsame, Chris Martin, Will Champion, Jonny Buckland, Guy Berryman |
| 2012 | K'naan | Country, God or the Girl | "Hurt Me Tomorrow" | Keinan Abdi Warsame, Evan Bogart, Noel Zancanella |
| 2012 | Leona Lewis | Glassheart | "Favourite Scar" | Leona Lewis, Noel Zancanella, Roland Orzabal, Curt Smith |
| 2012 | Leona Lewis | Glassheart | "Glassheart" | Leona Lewis, Brent Kutzle, Noel Zancanella, Justin Franks, Fis Shkreli, Peter Svensson |
| 2012 | Maroon 5 | Overexposed | "Lucky Strike" | Adam Levine, Noel Zancanella |
| 2012 | Maroon 5 | Overexposed | "Love Somebody" | Adam Levine, Noel Zancanella, Nathaniel Motte |
| 2012 | Gym Class Heroes featuring Ryan Tedder | The Papercut Chronicles II | "The Fighter" | Travie McCoy, Disashi Lumumba-Kasongo, Eric Roberts, Matt McGinley, Noel Zancanella, Jamie Heffernan |
| 2012 | Ramin Karimloo | Ramin | "Coming Home" | Greg Wells |
| 2012 | Kay | My Name Is Kay EP | "Strangers" | My Name Is Kay, Evan Bogart, Terrence Thorton, Noel Zancanella |
| 2012 | Kay | —N/a | "Diddy Dum" | My Name Is Kay, Evan Bogart, Noel Zancanella |
| 2012 | Katharine McPhee | The Music of Smash | "Touch Me" | Bonnie McKee |
| 2012 | Asher Monroe | —N/a | "Here With You" | Asher Monroe |
| 2012 | SafetySuit | These Times | "Let Go" | Douglas Brown |
| 2012 | Carrie Underwood | Blown Away | "Good in Goodbye" | Carrie Underwood, Hillary Lindsey |
| 2012 | The Wanted | Word of Mouth | "Satellite" | Noel Zancanella, Ciara Cleary, Evan Bogart |
| 2013 | Sammy Adams featuring Mike Posner | —N/a | "L.A. Story" | Sammy Adams, Mike Posner, Noel Zancanella |
| 2013 | Christina Aguilera | The Hunger Games: Catching Fire | "We Remain" | Brent Kutzle, Mikky Ekko |
| 2013 | Beyoncé | Beyoncé | "XO" | Beyoncé Knowles, Terius Nash |
| 2013 | Birdy | Fire Within | "Wings" | Jasmine van den Bogaerde |
| 2013 | Birdy | Fire Within | "Words as Weapons" | Jasmine van den Bogaerde |
| 2013 | James Blunt | Moon Landing | "Bonfire Heart" | James Blunt |
| 2013 | Colbie Caillat | —N/a | "Hold On" | Colbie Caillat |
| 2013 | Gavin DeGraw | Make a Move | "Finest Hour" | Gavin DeGraw |
| 2013 | Gavin DeGraw | Make a Move | "Need" | Gavin DeGraw |
| 2013 | The Fray | Helios | "Love Don't Die" | Isaac Slade, Joe King |
| 2013 | Delta Goodrem | —N/a | "Heart Hypnotic" | Delta Goodrem, Noel Zancanella, Justin Franks, Parker Ighile, Vince Pizzinga |
| 2013 | Ellie Goulding | Halcyon Days | "Burn" | Ellie Goulding, Greg Kurstin, Noel Zancanella, Brent Kutzle |
| 2013 | Demi Lovato | Demi | "Neon Lights" | Demi Lovato, Mario Marchetti, Tiffany Vartanyan, Noel Zancanella |
| 2013 | One Direction | Midnight Memories | "Right Now" | Liam Payne, Harry Styles, Louis Tomlinson |
| 2013 | OneRepublic | Native | "Counting Stars" | |
| 2013 | OneRepublic | Native | "If I Lose Myself" | Benjamin Levin, Brent Kutzle, Zach Filkins |
| 2013 | OneRepublic | Native | "Feel Again" | Brent Kutzle, Drew Brown, Noel Zancanella |
| 2013 | OneRepublic | Native | "What You Wanted" | Brent Kutzle |
| 2013 | OneRepublic | Native | "I Lived" | Noel Zancanella |
| 2013 | OneRepublic | Native | "Light It Up" | Brent Kutzle |
| 2013 | OneRepublic | Native | "Can't Stop" | Jeff Bhasker, Tyler Sam Johnson |
| 2013 | OneRepublic | Native | "Au Revoir" | Brent Kutzle |
| 2013 | OneRepublic | Native | "Burning Bridges" | Brent Kutzle |
| 2013 | OneRepublic | Native | "Something I Need" | Benjamin Levin |
| 2013 | OneRepublic | Native | "Preacher" | Brent Kutzle |
| 2013 | OneRepublic | Native | "Don't Look Down" | Brent Kutzle |
| 2013 | Parachute | Overnight | "Can't Help" | Will Anderson, Orel Yoel |
| 2014 | Tessanne Chin | Count on My Love | "Tumbling Down" | Noel Zancanella, Maureen McDonald, Edwin Serrano |
| 2014 | Ariana Grande | My Everything | "Why Try" | Benjamin Levin, Ammar Malik, Noel Zancanella |
| 2014 | Ella Henderson | Chapter One | "Ghost" | Ella Henderson, Noel Zancanella |
| 2014 | Maroon 5 | V | "Maps" | Adam Levine, Benjamin Levin, Ammar Malik, Noel Zancanella |
| 2014 | Maroon 5 | V | "New Love" | Adam Levine, Noel Zancanella |
| 2014 | Olly Murs | Never Been Better | "Seasons" | Ammar Malik, Noel Zancanella |
| 2014 | OneRepublic | Native (re-release) | "Love Runs Out" | Brent Kutzle, Drew Brown, Zach Filkins, Eddie Fisher |
| 2014 | The Script | No Sound Without Silence | "Flares" | Danny O'Donoghue, Mark Sheehan, James Barry |
| 2014 | Gwen Stefani | Non-album single | "Baby Don't Lie" | Gwen Stefani, Benjamin Levin, Noel Zancanella |
| 2014 | Taylor Swift | 1989 | "I Know Places" | Taylor Swift |
| 2014 | Taylor Swift | 1989 | "Welcome to New York" | Taylor Swift |
| 2015 | Adele | 25 | "Remedy" | Adele Adkins |
| 2015 | Mikky Ekko | Time | "Love You Crazy" | Mikky Ekko, Noel Zancanella |
| 2015 | Mikky Ekko | Time | "Loner" | Mikky Ekko, Noel Zancanella |
| 2015 | Ellie Goulding | Delirium | "Keep On Dancin" | Ellie Goulding, Nicole Morier, Noel Zancanella |
| 2015 | Demi Lovato | Confident | "Wildfire" | Nicole Morier, Mikkel S. Eriksen, Tor Hermansen |
| 2015 | Katharine McPhee | Hysteria | "Stranger Than Fiction" | Katharine McPhee, Smith Carlson, Ali Tamposi |
| 2015 | Rob Thomas | The Great Unknown | "Trust You" | Rob Thomas, Noel Zancanella |
| 2015 | Ryn Weaver | The Fool | "Pierre" | Ryn Weaver, Michael Angelakos, Benjamin Levin |
| 2015 | Zedd | True Colors | "I Want You to Know (featuring Selena Gomez)" | Anton Zaslavski, Kevin Nicholas Drew |
| 2016 | Cassius | Ibifornia | "The Missing" | Cassius, Jaw |
| 2016 | OneRepublic | Oh My My | "Let's Hurt Tonight" | |
| 2016 | OneRepublic | Oh My My | "Future Looks Good" | Brent Kutzle |
| 2016 | OneRepublic | Oh My My | "Oh My My" (featuring Cassius) | |
| 2016 | OneRepublic | Oh My My | "Kids" | Brent Kutzle, Brandon Michael Collins, Steve Wilmot |
| 2016 | OneRepublic | Oh My My | "Dream" | |
| 2016 | OneRepublic | Oh My My | "Choke" | |
| 2016 | OneRepublic | Oh My My | "A.I." (featuring Peter Gabriel) | |
| 2016 | OneRepublic | Oh My My | "Better" | |
| 2016 | OneRepublic | Oh My My | "Born" | |
| 2016 | OneRepublic | Oh My My | "Fingertips" | |
| 2016 | OneRepublic | Oh My My | "Human" | |
| 2016 | OneRepublic | Oh My My | "Lift Me Up" | |
| 2016 | OneRepublic | Oh My My | "NbHD" (featuring Santigold) | |
| 2016 | OneRepublic | Oh My My | "Wherever I Go" | Brent Kutzle, Noel Zancanella |
| 2016 | OneRepublic | Oh My My | "All These Things" | |
| 2016 | OneRepublic | Oh My My | "Heaven" | |
| 2016 | OneRepublic | Oh My My | "Colors" | |
| 2016 | OneRepublic | Oh My My | "The Less I Know" | |
| 2016 | Stevie Wonder | Sing: Original Motion Picture Soundtrack | "Faith" (featuring Ariana Grande) | Benjamin Levin |
| 2017 | Ed Sheeran | ÷ | "Happier" | Benjamin Levin |
| 2017 | OneRepublic | Non-album single | "No Vacancy" | Tor Erik Hermansen, Mikkel Storleer Eriksen Brent Kutzle, Drew Brown, Zach Filkins |
| 2017 | Hailee Steinfeld | Non-album single | "Most Girls" | Hailee Steinfeld, Tim "One Love" Sommers, Zach Skelton, Asia Whiteacre and Jeremy "Kinetics" Dussolliet |
| 2017 | Molly Kate Kestner | Non-album single | "It's You" | Molly Kate Kestner |
| 2017 | OneRepublic | Non-album single | "Truth to Power" | |
| 2017 | LANY | LANY | "Super Far" | Charles Priest, Jake Goss, Paul Klein |
| 2017 | OneRepublic & Seeb | Non-album single | "Rich Love" | Brent Kutzle, Seeb |
| 2017 | Jessie Ware | Glasshouse | "Selfish Love" | Ross Golan, Ammar Malik, Benny Blanco, Cashmere Cat, Happy Perez |
| 2017 | Rachel Platten | Waves | "Labels" | Rachel Platten, Zach Skelton |
| 2017 | Kygo featuring OneRepublic | Kids in Love | "Stranger Things" | |
| 2018 | Camila Cabello | Camila | "Into It" | Camila Cabello, Frank Dukes, Louis Bell, Kaan Gunesberk, Justin Tranter |
| 2018 | Elijah Woods x Jamie Fine | TBA | "Ain't Easy" | Camila Cabello, Zach Skelton |
| 2018 | X Ambassadors | TBA | "Don't Stay" | Casey Harris, Sam Harris, Adam Levin, Zach Skelton |
| 2018 | Shawn Mendes | Shawn Mendes | "Particular Taste" | Shawn Mendes, Zach Skelton |
| 2018 | Paul McCartney | Egypt Station | "Fuh You" | Paul McCartney |
| 2019 | Lil Nas X | 7 | "Bring U Down" | Montero Lamar Hill, Zach Skelton |
| 2019 | Backstreet Boys | DNA | "Chances" | Shawn Mendes, Zach Skelton, Scott Harris, Geoff Warburton, Francis Zamir, Fiona Bevan, Casey Smith |
| 2019 | Jonas Brothers | Happiness Begins | "Sucker" | Nick Jonas, Joe Jonas, Kevin Jonas |
| 2019 | Jonas Brothers | Happiness Begins | "Cool" | Nick Jonas, Joe Jonas, Kevin Jonas |
| 2019 | Jonas Brothers | Happiness Begins | "Rollercoaster" | Casey Smith, Jonas Jeberg, Michael Pollack, Zach Skelton |
| 2019 | P!nk feat. Cash Cash | Hurts 2B Human | "Can We Pretend" | Alecia Moore, Jean Makhlouf, Alexander Makhlouf, Samuel Frisch |
| 2019 | OneRepublic | Human | "Rescue Me" | Brent Kutzle |
| 2019 | Thomas Rhett | Center Point Road | "That Old Truck" | Thomas Rhett, Julian Bunetta, Kamron Kimbro |
| 2019 | Thomas Rhett feat. Jon Pardi | Center Point Road | "Beer Can't Fix" | Thomas Rhett, Julian Bunetta, Zach Skelton |
| 2019 | Leona Lewis, Cali y El Dandee and Juan Magán | Non-album single | "Solo Quiero (Somebody to Love)" | Alejandro Rengifo, Alessando Calemme, Andrés Torres, Ester Dean, Juan Magán, Leona Lewis, Matthew Fonson, Mauricio Rengifo, Rosalyn Athalie Chivonne Lockhart, Shane McAnally |
| 2019 | OneRepublic | Human | "Wanted" | Casey Smith, Brent Kutzle, Zach Skelton, Tyler Spry |
| 2019 | OneRepublic | Human | "Somebody to Love" | Brent Kutzle, Shane McAnally, Ester Dean, Andrew Wells, Andrew DeRoberts, JT Roach, Jintae Ko |
| 2019 | Camila Cabello | Romance | "Cry for Me" | Camila Cabello, Adam Feeney, Louis Bell |
| 2019 | Liam Payne | LP1 | "Say It All" | Liam Payne, Sandy Wilhelm, Mikkel Eriksen, Tor Hermansen |
| 2019 | Westlife | Spectrum | "Dance" | Luka Kloser, Zach Skelton, Casey Smith |
| 2020 | 5 Seconds of Summer | Calm | "Easier" | Charlie Puth, Louis Bell, Ali Tamposi, Andrew Watt |
| 2020 | 5 Seconds of Summer | Calm | "Teeth" | Luke Hemmings, Ashton Irwin, Ali Tamposi, Andrew Watt, Bernard Sumner, Carl Sturken, Evan Rogers, Peter Hook, Gillian Gilbert, Stephen Morris |
| 2020 | 5 Seconds of Summer | Calm | "Best Years" | Luke Hemmings, Ali Tamposi, Andrew Watt, Nathan Perez |
| 2020 | Anitta | | "Tócame" | Anitta, Arcángel, De La Ghetto, Andrés Torres, Mauricio Rengifo |
| 2020 | Blackpink | The Album | "Bet You Wanna" (featuring Cardi B) | Tommy Brown, Steven Franks, Melanie Fontana, Belcalis Almanzar, Torae Carr, Jonathan Descartes |
| 2020 | Miley Cyrus | Plastic Hearts | "WTF Do I Know" | Miley Cyrus, Ali Tamposi, Andrew Watt, Louis Bell |
| 2020 | Miley Cyrus | Plastic Hearts | "Plastic Hearts" | Miley Cyrus, Ali Tamposi, Andrew Watt, Louis Bell |
| 2020 | Miley Cyrus | Plastic Hearts | "Angels like You" | Miley Cyrus, Ali Tamposi, Andrew Watt, Louis Bell |
| 2020 | Miley Cyrus | Plastic Hearts | "Night Crawling" (feat. Billy Idol) | Miley Cyrus, Billy Idol, Michael Pollack, Ali Tamposi, Andrew Watt, Nathan Perez, Taylor Hawkins |
| 2020 | Jonas Brothers | Non-album single | "What a Man Gotta Do" | Nick Jonas, Joe Jonas, Kevin Jonas, David Stewart, Jessica Agombar |
| 2020 | Lady Gaga | Chromatica | "Sine from Above" (with Elton John) | Lady Gaga, BloodPop, Elton John, Axwell, Rami Yacoub, Richard Zastenker, Vincent Pontare, Sebastian Ingrosso, Johannes Klahr, Benjamin Rice, Salem Al Fakir |
| 2020 | OneRepublic | Human | "Didn't I" | Brent Kutzle, Zach Skelton, James Abrahart, Kyrre Gørvell-Dahll |
| 2020 | Sam Smith | Love Goes | "Kids Again" | Sam Smith, Ali Tamposi, Andrew Watt, Louis Bell |
| 2020 | Twice | Non-album single | "Cry for Me" | Melanie Joy Fontana, Michel "Lindgren" Schulz, A Wrigh |
| 2021 | Bastille | Give Me the Future | "Distorted Light Beam" | Dan Smith, Mark Crew, Marty Rod |
| 2021 | Justin Bieber | Justice | "Somebody" | Justin Bieber, Sonny Moore, Rami Yacoub, Bernard Harvey, Ilya Salmanzadeh, Josh Gudwin, Gregory Hein |
| 2021 | Lil Nas X | Montero | "Thats What I Want" | Lil Nas X, Omer Fedi, Blake Slatkin, KBeaZy |
| 2021 | OneRepublic | Human | "Run" | Brent Kutzle, John Nathaniel, Tyler Spry |
| 2021 | OneRepublic | Human | "Distance" | Casey Smith, Jason Evigan, Mathieu Jomphe-Lepin |
| 2021 | OneRepublic | Human | "Someday" | Brent Kutzle, Tyler Spry, Steven Mudd, Josh Varnadore |
| 2021 | OneRepublic | Human | "Didn't I" | Brent Kutzle, Zach Skelton, James Abrahart, Kyrre Gørvell-Dahll |
| 2021 | OneRepublic | Human | "Rescue Me" | Brent Kutzle |
| 2021 | OneRepublic | Human | "Savior" | Brent Kutzle, Zach Skelton |
| 2021 | OneRepublic | Human | "Take Care of You" | Brent Kutzle, Eddie Fisher, John Nathaniel |
| 2021 | OneRepublic | Human | "Forgot About You" | Louis Bell, Andrew Watt, Ali Tamposi, Nick Mira |
| 2021 | OneRepublic | Human | "Somebody to Love" | Brent Kutzle, Shane McAnally, Ester Dean, Andrew Wells, Andrew DeRoberts, JT Roach, Jintae Ko |
| 2021 | OneRepublic | Human | "Wanted" | Brent Kutzle, Casey Smith, Zach Skelton, Tyler Spry |
| 2021 | OneRepublic | Human | "Take It Out on Me" | Julia Michaels, Michael Tucker |
| 2021 | OneRepublic | Human | "Better Days" | Brent Kutzle, John Nathaniel |
| 2021 | OneRepublic | Human | "Wild Life" | Brent Kutzle, John Nathaniel |
| 2021 | OneRepublic | Human | "Ships + Tides" | Brent Kutzle, Noel Zancanella |
| 2021 | OneRepublic | Human | "Lose Somebody" | Kyrre Gørvell-Dahll, Philip Plested, Jacob Torrey, Morten Ristorp, Alexander Delicata, Alysa Vanderheym |
| 2022 | Michael Bublé | Higher | "Higher" | Michael Bublé, Noah Bublé, Greg Wells |
| 2022 | DNCE | —N/a | "Move" | Joe Jonas, Andrew DeRoberts |
| 2022 | John Legend | Legend | "Dope" (feat. JID) | John Stephens, Destin Route, Charlie Puth, Ian Kirkpatrick |
| 2022 | John Legend | Legend | "Strawberry Blush" (feat. Free Nationals) | John Stephens, José Rios, Ron Avant, Kelsey Gonzales, Matthew Merisola, Drew Love, Melvin Moore |
| 2022 | John Legend | Legend | "Guy Like Me" | John Stephens, Andrew DeRoberts |
| 2022 | John Legend | Legend | "All She Wanna Do" (feat. Saweetie) | John Stephens, Diamonté Harper, Michawl Pollack, Jake Torrey, Tia Scola, Jeff Halavacs, Larrance Dopson, Stefan Johnson, Jordan K. Johnson, Zach Skelton |
| 2022 | John Legend | Legend | "Wonder Woman" | John Stephens, Connor McDonough, Riley McDonough, Toby McDonough, Ryan Daly, Castle, Curtis Mayfield |
| 2022 | John Legend | Legend | "Honey" (feat. Muni Long) | John Stephens, Priscilla Hariston, Melanie Fontana, Gregory Hein, Bernard Harvey, Steven Franks, Michael Schulz |
| 2022 | Machine Gun Kelly | Mainstream Sellout | "Fake Love Don't Last" (with Iann Dior) | Colson Baker, Travis Barker, Omer Fedi, Nick Long, Keegan Bach, Michael Olmo |
| 2022 | Tiësto & Tate McRae | Drive | "10:35" | Tijs Verwest, Scott Harris, Amy Allen, Peter Rycroft, Tate McRae |
| 2022 | Gryffin | Alive | "You Were Loved" (with OneRepublic) | Gryffin, Brent Kutzle |
| 2023 | Ava Max | Diamonds & Dancefloors | "Weapons" | Amanda Ava Koci, Melanie Fontana, Michael Schultz, Madison Love, Cirkut |
| 2023 | &Team | First Howling: Now | "Dropkick" | Grant Boutin, David Stewart, Soma Genda, Temma Tai, Jamesy Minimal |
| 2023 | Blackpink | —N/a | "The Girls" | Jennie, Rosé, Melanie Fontana, Danny Chung, Michel "Lindgren" Schulz, Madison Love |
| 2023 | (G)I-dle | Heat | "I Want That" | Melanie Fontana, Michel "Lindgren" Schulz, Madison Love |
| 2023 | Reneé Rapp featuring Megan Thee Stallion | Mean Girls | "Not My Fault" | Reneé Rapp, Megan Thee Stallion, Alexander 23, Billy Walsh, Jasper Harris, Jeff Richmond, Nell Benjamin |
| 2023 | Sam Smith & Madonna | - | "Vulgar" | Sam Smith, Madonna, Ilya Salmanzadeh, Omer Fedi, Henry Walter, James Napier |
| 2023 | Tate McRae | Think Later | "Cut My Hair" | Tate McRae, Amy Allen, Jasper Harris |
| 2023 | Tate McRae | Think Later | "Greedy" | Tate McRae, Amy Allen, Jasper Harris |
| 2023 | Tate McRae | Think Later | "Run for the Hills" | Tate McRae, Amy Allen, Jasper Harris, Grant Boutin |
| 2023 | Tate McRae | Think Later | "Hurt My Feelings" | Tate McRae, Amy Allen, Jasper Harris, Grant Boutin |
| 2023 | Tate McRae | Think Later | "Stay Done" | Tate McRae, Amy Allen |
| 2023 | Tate McRae | Think Later | "Exes" | Tate McRae, Tyler Spry |
| 2023 | Tate McRae | Think Later | "Think Later" | Tate McRae, Amy Allen, Jasper Harris |
| 2023 | Tate McRae | Think Later | "Guilty Conscience" | Tate McRae, Ilya Salmanzadeh, Savan Kotecha, Amy Allen |
| 2023 | Tate McRae | Think Later | "Want That Too" | Tate McRae, Amy Allen, Jasper Harris, Tyler Spry |
| 2023 | Taylor Swift | 1989 (Taylor's Version) | "Welcome to New York (Taylor's Version)" | Taylor Swift |
| 2023 | Taylor Swift | 1989 (Taylor's Version) | "I Know Places (Taylor's Version)" | Taylor Swift |
| 2023 | Tomorrow X Together | The Name Chapter: Freefall | "Do It Like That" | Grant Boutin, Coleton Rubin |
| 2023 | Tomorrow X Together | The Name Chapter: Freefall | "Back For More" (TXT Ver.) | Slow Rabbit, Tyler Spry |
| 2024 | Mimi Webb | TBA | "Mistake" | Tyler Spry, Mimi Webb, Casey Smith |
| 2024 | Justin Timberlake | Everything I Thought It Was | "Play" | Justin Timberlake, Michael Pollack, Floyd Nathaniel Hills, Federico Vindver, Zack Skelton, Andrew DeRoberts |
| 2024 | Beyoncé & Miley Cyrus | Cowboy Carter | "II Most Wanted" | Beyoncé Knowles-Carter, Miley Cyrus, Michael Pollack |
| 2024 | Bon Jovi | Forever | "We Made It Look Easy" | Jon Bon Jovi, Andrew DeRoberts, Nick Long |
| 2024 | Bon Jovi | Forever | "Seeds" | Jon Bon Jovi, Sean Douglas, Michael Pollack |
| 2024 | Lisa | Alter Ego | "Rockstar" | Lisa, Brittany Amaradio, James Essien, Lucy Healey, Sam Homaee |
| 2024 | Katseye | SIS (Soft Is Strong) | "Debut" | Tyler Spry, Grant Boutin, Omer Fedi |
| 2024 | OneRepublic | Artificial Paradise | "Hurt" | Tyler Spry |
| 2024 | OneRepublic | Artificial Paradise | "Sink or Swim" | Brent Kutzle, John Nathaniel, Simon Oscroft, Josh Varnadore |
| 2024 | OneRepublic | Artificial Paradise | "Last Holiday" | Brent Kutzle, Noel Zancanella |
| 2024 | OneRepublic | Artificial Paradise | "I Ain't Worried" | Brent Kutzle, John Eriksson, Peter Morén, Tyler Spry, Björn Yttling |
| 2024 | OneRepublic | Artificial Paradise | "Red Light Green Light" | Brent Kutzle, John Nathaniel |
| 2024 | OneRepublic | Artificial Paradise | "Serotonin" | Brent Kutzle, Tyler Spry, Josh Varnadore |
| 2024 | OneRepublic | Artificial Paradise | "Singapore" | John Nathaniel, Brian Willett |
| 2024 | OneRepublic | Artificial Paradise | "Room for You" | Brent Kutzle, Tyler Spry, Noel Zancanella |
| 2024 | OneRepublic | Artificial Paradise | "Stargazing" | Brandyn Burnette, Joe Henderson, Brent Kutzle, Chase Stockman |
| 2024 | OneRepublic | Artificial Paradise | "West Coast" | Brent Kutzle, Robin Fredriksson, Mattias Larsson, Justin Tranter, Noel Zancanella |
| 2024 | OneRepublic | Artificial Paradise | "Runaway" | Thomas Bangalter, Guy-Manuel de Homem-Christo, Brent Kutzle, Noah Lennox, Ben Samama, Johnny Simpson, Nolan Sipe, Josh Varnadore |
| 2024 | OneRepublic | Artificial Paradise | "Sunshine" | Brent Kutzle, Zach Skelton, Casey Smith, Tyler Spry, Noel Zancanella |
| 2024 | OneRepublic | Artificial Paradise | "Mirage" | Mishaal Tamer, Brendan Angelides, Grant Boutin, Will Jay, Coleton Rubin |
| 2024 | OneRepublic | Artificial Paradise | "Nobody" | Brent Kutzle, Joe Henderson, Tyler Spry, Josh Varnadore |
| 2024 | OneRepublic | Artificial Paradise | "I Don't Wanna Wait"(with David Guetta) | David Guetta, Brent Kutzle, Jakke Erixson, Gregory Hein, Michael Pollack, Timofey Reznikov, Tyler Spry, Josh Varnadore |
| 2024 | OneRepublic | Artificial Paradise | "Fire" | Luca de Gregorio, Mattia Vitale, Simone Giani, Brent Kutzle, Leonie Burger, Tyler Spry, Josh Varnadore, Vitali Zestovskih |
| 2025 | Lisa | Alter Ego | "Rapunzel" (featuring Megan Thee Stallion) | Lisa, Megan Pete, Sam Homaee, Gregory Hein, Carly Gilbert |
| 2025 | Lisa | Alter Ego | "Lifestyle" | Lisa, Grant Boutin, Abby Keen, James Essein |
| 2025 | Tate McRae | So Close to What | "Miss Possessive" | Tate Mcrae, Amy Allen, Blake Slatkin |
| 2025 | Tate McRae | So Close to What | "2 Hands" | Tate McRae, Amy Allen, Peter Rycroft |
| 2025 | Tate McRae | So Close to What | "Revolving Door" | Tate McRae, Grant Boutin, Julia Michaels |
| 2025 | Tate McRae | So Close to What | "Bloodonmyhands" (featuring Flo Milli) | Tate McRae, Grant Boutin, Tamia Carter |
| 2025 | Tate McRae | So Close to What | "Dear God" | Tate McRae, Grant Boutin, Julia Michaels |
| 2025 | Tate McRae | So Close to What | "Sports Car" | Tate McRae, Grant Boutin, Julia Michaels |
| 2025 | Tate McRae | So Close to What | "I Know Love" (featuring The Kid Laroi) | Tate McRae, Tyler Spry, Julia Michaels, Charlton Howard, Billy Walsh |
| 2025 | Tate McRae | So Close to What | "It's OK I'm OK" | Tate McRae, Ilya Salmanzadeh, Savan Kotecha |
| 2025 | Tate McRae | So Close to What | "No I'm Not in Love" | Tate McRae, Peter Rycroft, Amy Allen |
| 2025 | Tate McRae | So Close to What | "Nobody's Girl" | Tate McRae, Emile Haynie, Amy Allen |
| 2025 | Tate McRae | So Close to What | "Tit for Tat" | Tate McRae, Grant Boutin, Julia Michaels |
| 2025 | D4vd | Withered | "Is This Really Love?" | David Burke, Tyler Spry |
| 2025 | Reneé Rapp | Bite Me | "Sometimes" | Reneé Rapp, Omer Fedi, Julian Bunetta, Alexander 23, Ali Tamposi |
| 2025 | Maroon 5 | Love Is Like (Deluxe Digital Edition) | "Cigarettes" | Adam Levine, John Ryan, Jacob Kasher Hindlin, Tyler Spry, Phil Shaouy |
| 2025 | Ava Max | Don't Click Play | "Fight For Me" | Amanda Ava Koci, Melanie Fontana, Michel "Lindgren" Schulz |
| 2025 | Jonas Brothers | Greetings from Your Hometown | "Waste No Time" | Nicholas Jonas, Kevin Jonas II, Jordan K. Johnson, Stefan Johnson |
| 2025 | Miley Cyrus | Something Beautiful | "Easy Lover" | Miley Cyrus, Michael Pollak, Omer Fedi |
| 2025 | Jessie J | Don't Tease Me with a Good Time | "I'll Never Know Why" | Jessica Cornish, Marty Rod |
| 2025 | Jessie J | Don't Tease Me with a Good Time | "Threw It Away" | Jessica Cornish, Marty Rod |
| 2025 | Jessie J | Don't Tease Me with a Good Time | "California" | Jessica Cornish |
| 2025 | Jessie J | Don't Tease Me with a Good Time | "Living My Best Life" | Jessica Cornish, Marty Rod, Andrew DeRoberts |
| 2025 | Jessie J | Don't Tease Me with a Good Time | "H.A.P.P.Y" | Jessica Cornish, Marty Rod |
| 2025 | Illenium | Odyssey | "With Your Love" (featuring Ryan Tedder) | Nicholas Miller, Amy Allen, Peter Rycroft |
| 2026 | BTS | Arirang | "Body to Body" | Maxime Picard, Thomas Wesley Pentz, Akira Evans, Teezo Touchdown, Pdogg, RM, Suga, J-Hope, Kirsten Allyssa Spencer |
| 2026 | BTS | Arirang | "Swim" | James Essein, Sean Foreman, Tyler Spry, Jamison Baken, RM, Kirsten Allyssa Spencer, Derrick Milano, Pdogg |
| 2026 | BTS | Arirang | "Normal" | Sean Foreman, Livvi Franc, Sean Cook, RM, J-Hope, Suga, Kirsten Alyssa Spencer, Derrick Milano, Pdogg |
| 2026 | BTS | Arirang | "Please" | Tyler Spry, James Essein, RM, Suga, J-Hope |
| 2026 | XO | Need to Know | "Clique" | Willow Kayne, Ellrod |

== Production discography ==
Discography
| Year | Artist | Album | Song | Co-produced with |
|---|---|---|---|---|
| 2005 | t.A.T.u. | Dangerous and Moving | "Divine" | Kierszenbaum Martin |
| 2007 | Baby Bash | Cyclone | "Dip with You" | Erick Coomes, Justin Trugman |
| 2007 | Baby Bash | Cyclone | "Thrill Is Gone" | |
| 2007 | Natasha Bedingfield | Pocketful of Sunshine | "Love Like This" | The Runawayz |
| 2007 | Hilary Duff | Dignity | "Gypsy Woman" | |
| 2007 | Blake Lewis | A.D.D | "Break Anotha" | Sam Watters |
| 2007 | Blake Lewis | A.D.D | "Gots to Get Her" | The Jam |
| 2007 | Blake Lewis | A.D.D | "Know My Name" | |
| 2007 | Blake Lewis | A.D.D | "Surrender" | |
| 2007 | Blake Lewis | A.D.D | "Hate 2 Love Her" | |
| 2007 | Blake Lewis | A.D.D | "End of the World" | The Jam |
| 2007 | Blake Lewis | A.D.D | "I Got U" | |
| 2007 | Blake Lewis | A.D.D | "Without You" | Sam Watters, Louis Biancaniello, Wayne Wilkins |
| 2007 | Leona Lewis | Spirit | "Bleeding Love" | |
| 2007 | Leona Lewis | Spirit | "Take a Bow" | The Runaways, Wayne Wilkins |
| 2007 | Jennifer Lopez | Brave | "Do It Well" | Cory Rooney |
| 2007 | OneRepublic | Dreaming Out Loud | "Come Home" | |
| 2007 | Shayne Ward | Breathless | "Gonna Be Alright" | |
| 2007 | Shayne Ward | Breathless | "Tell Him" | Justin Trugman |
| 2008 | Beyoncé | I Am... Sasha Fierce | "Halo" | |
| 2008 | Hilary Duff | Best of Hilary Duff | "Reach Out" | |
| 2008 | Hilary Duff | Best of Hilary Duff | "Holiday" | Joe Berandez, Chris Bennett |
| 2008 | Monrose | I Am | "Strike the Match" | Jiant, Snowflakers |
| 2008 | NLT | —N/a | "Karma" | |
| 2009 | Backstreet Boys | This Is Us | "Undone" | Troy Johnson |
| 2009 | Dima Bilan | Believe | "Amnesia" | |
| 2009 | Kelly Clarkson | All I Ever Wanted | "Already Gone" | |
| 2009 | Kelly Clarkson | All I Ever Wanted | "If I Can't Have You" | |
| 2009 | Kelly Clarkson | All I Ever Wanted | "Save You" | |
| 2009 | Kelly Clarkson | All I Ever Wanted | "Impossible" | |
| 2009 | Kelly Clarkson | All I Ever Wanted | "Tip of My Tongue" | |
| 2009 | Chris Cornell | Chris Cornell | | |
| 2009 | Kristinia DeBarge | Exposed | "Speak Up" | |
| 2009 | Esmée Denters | Outta Here | "Victim" | Justin Timberlake |
| 2009 | Nikki Flores | —N/a | "Gravity" | |
| 2009 | Nikki Flores | —N/a | "Long Road Home" | |
| 2009 | Adam Lambert | For Your Entertainment | "Sleepwalker" | |
| 2009 | Adam Lambert | For Your Entertainment | "Master Plan" | |
| 2009 | Leona Lewis | Echo | "Happy | |
| 2009 | Leona Lewis | Echo | "You Don't Care" | |
| 2009 | Leona Lewis | Echo | "Lost Then Found" | Brent Kutzle, Noel Zancanella, Dan Mukala |
| 2009 | James Morrison | Songs for You, Truths for Me | "Please Don't Stop the Rain | |
| 2009 | OneRepublic | Waking Up | "Made for You" | Brent Kutzle |
| 2009 | OneRepublic | Waking Up | "All the Right Moves" | Brent Kitzle, Andrew Picket |
| 2009 | OneRepublic | Waking Up | "Secrets" | Andrew Pickett |
| 2009 | OneRepublic | Waking Up | "Everybody Loves Me" | Brent Kutzle, Andrew Pickett |
| 2009 | OneRepublic | Waking Up | "Missing Persons 1 & 2" | |
| 2009 | OneRepublic | Waking Up | "Good Life" | Brent Kutzle, Noel Zancanella |
| 2009 | OneRepublic | Waking Up | "All This Time" | Brent Kutzle |
| 2009 | OneRepublic | Waking Up | "Fear" | |
| 2009 | OneRepublic | Waking Up | "Waking Up" | |
| 2009 | OneRepublic | Waking Up | "Marchin On" | |
| 2009 | OneRepublic | Waking Up | "Lullaby" | Brent Kutzle, Andrew Pickett |
| 2009 | The Pussycat Dolls | —N/a | "Whatever Happens" | |
| 2009 | Jordin Sparks | Battlefield | Battlefield" | The Runnaways, Sam Watters |
| 2009 | Westlife | Where We Are | "Shadows" | |
| 2009 | Westlife | Where We Are | "Where We Are" | |
| 2010 | Natasha Bedingfield | Strip Me | "Strip Me" | Natasha Bedingfield, Wayne Wilkins |
| 2010 | Natasha Bedingfield | Strip Me | "Neon Lights" | Natasha Bedingfield, Wayne Wilkins |
| 2010 | Burnham | Almost Famous | "Catch Me If You Can" | |
| 2010 | Sky Ferreira | —N/a | "Obsession | Jerrod Bettis, Justin Franks |
| 2010 | Nikki Flores | —N/a | "City Lights | |
| 2010 | Nikki Flores | —N/a | "No Tomorrows | |
| 2010 | Nikki Flores | —N/a | "Warrior | |
| 2010 | BC Jean | —N/a | "Just a Guy" | |
| 2010 | Tamar Kaprelian | Sinner or a Saint | "Sinner or a Saint" | Brent Kutzle |
| 2010 | Sons of Sylvia | Revelations | "Love Left to Lose" | |
| 2010 | Stan Walker | From the Inside Out | "Unbroken" | |
| 2011 | Adele | 21 | "Rumour Has It | |
| 2011 | Beyoncé | 4 | "I Was Here" | Brent Kutzle, Beyoncé Knowles, Kuk Harrell |
| 2011 | Big Time Rush | Elevate | "Music Sounds Better with U" | |
| 2011 | B.o.B | EPIC: Every Play Is Crucial | "Wrong" | |
| 2011 | Cobra Starship | Night Shades | "#1Nite (One Night)" | Brent Kutzle |
| 2011 | Javier Colon | Come Through For You | "1,000 Lights" | |
| 2011 | Gavin DeGraw | Sweeter | "Not Over You" | Jerrod Bettis |
| 2011 | Gavin DeGraw | Sweeter | "Sweeter" | |
| 2011 | Thomas Fiss | RT - EP | "Speak Up" | |
| 2011 | Thomas Fiss | RT - EP | "Gravity" | |
| 2011 | Thomas Fiss | RT - EP | "You Don't Care" | |
| 2011 | Thomas Fiss | RT - EP | "Ice" | |
| 2011 | Thomas Fiss | RT - EP | "Shadows" | |
| 2011 | Jennifer Hudson | I Remember Me | "I Remember Me" | |
| 2011 | Kay | —N/a | "My Name Is Kay" | |
| 2011 | Demi Lovato featuring Dev | Unbroken | "Who's That Boy" | Noel Zancanella, Devin Tailes |
| 2011 | Jordin Sparks | —N/a | "I Am Woman" | |
| 2011 | Jordin Sparks | —N/a | "The World I Knew" | |
| 2012 | B.o.B | Strange Clouds | "So Good" | |
| 2012 | B.o.B | Strange Clouds | "Never Let You Go" | Noel Zancanella |
| 2012 | B.o.B | Strange Clouds | "Castles" | Noel Zancanella |
| 2012 | Colbie Caillat | All of You | "Brighter Than the Sun" | |
| 2012 | Colbie Caillat | All of You | "Favorite Song" | |
| 2012 | Altiyan Childs | —N/a | "Ordinary Man" | |
| 2012 | Gym Class Heroes featuring Ryan Tedder | The Papercut Chronicles II | "The Fighter" | |
| 2012 | Kay | My Name Is Kay EP | "Strangers" | |
| 2012 | Kay | —N/a | "Diddy Dum" | |
| 2012 | K'naan | Country, God or the Girl | "Better" | |
| 2012 | K'naan | Country, God or the Girl | "Hurt Me Tomorrow" | |
| 2012 | Leona Lewis | Glassheart | "Favourite Scar" | Noel Zancanella |
| 2012 | Leona Lewis | Glassheart | "Glassheart" | Brent Kutzle, Noel Zancanella, DJ Frank E, Fis Shkreli |
| 2012 | Maroon 5 | Overexposed | "Lucky Strike" | Noel Zancanella |
| 2012 | Maroon 5 | Overexposed | "Love Somebody" | Noel Zancanella |
| 2012 | Katharine McPhee | The Music of Smash | "Touch Me" | |
| 2012 | Asher Monroe | —N/a | "Here With You" | |
| 2012 | SafetySuit | These Times | "Let Go" | Noel Zancanella |
| 2012 | The Wanted | Word of Mouth | "Satellite" | Noel Zancanella |
| 2013 | Sammy Adams featuring Mike Posner | —N/a | "L.A. Story" | Noel Zancanella |
| 2013 | Beyoncé | Beyoncé | "XO" | Beyoncé Knowles, Terius Nash, Hit-Boy, HazeBanga Music |
| 2013 | Birdy | Fire Within | "Wings" | Rich Costey |
| 2013 | Birdy | Fire Within | "Words as Weapons" | |
| 2013 | James Blunt | Moon Landing | "Bonfire Heart" | |
| 2013 | Colbie Caillat | —N/a | "Hold On" | |
| 2013 | Gavin DeGraw | Make a Move | "Finest Hour" | Noel Zancanella |
| 2013 | Gavin DeGraw | Make a Move | "Need" | Noel Zancanella |
| 2013 | The Fray | Helios | "Love Don't Die" | Stuart Price |
| 2013 | Delta Goodrem | —N/a | "Heart Hypnotic" | |
| 2013 | Demi Lovato | Demi | "Neon Lights" | Noel Zancanella |
| 2013 | One Direction | Midnight Memories | "Right Now" | Gosling |
| 2013 | OneRepublic | Native | "Counting Stars" | Noel Zancanella |
| 2013 | OneRepublic | Native | "If I Lose Myself" | Benjamin Levin, Brent Kutzle |
| 2013 | OneRepublic | Native | "Feel Again" | Brent Kutzle, Noel Zancanella, Drew Brown |
| 2013 | OneRepublic | Native | "What You Wanted" | Brent Kutzle |
| 2013 | OneRepublic | Native | "I Lived" | Noel Zancanella |
| 2013 | OneRepublic | Native | "Light It Up" | Brent Kutzle |
| 2013 | OneRepublic | Native | "Can't Stop" | Jeff Bhasker, Tyler Sam Johnson, Emile Haynie |
| 2013 | OneRepublic | Native | "Burning Bridges" | Brent Kutzle, Noel Zancanella, Zdar and Boombass |
| 2013 | OneRepublic | Native | "Something I Need" | Benny Blanco |
| 2013 | OneRepublic | Native | "Preacher" | Brent Kutzle |
| 2014 | Ariana Grande | My Everything | "Why Try" | Benny Blanco, Noel Zancanella |
| 2014 | Ella Henderson | Chapter One | "Ghost" | Noel Zancanella |
| 2014 | Maroon 5 | V | "Maps" | Benny Blanco, Noel Zancanella, Noah Passovoy |
| 2014 | Maroon 5 | V | "New Love" | Noel Zancanella |
| 2014 | Taylor Swift | 1989 | "I Know Places'' | Taylor Swift, Noel Zancanella |
| 2014 | Taylor Swift | 1989 | ''Welcome to New York'' | Taylor Swift, Noel Zancanella |
| 2014 | Olly Murs | Never Been Better | "Seasons" | Noel Zancanella, Jason Elliott |
| 2014 | OneRepublic | Native (re-release) | "Love Runs Out" | |
| 2014 | U2 | Songs of Innocence | "The Miracle (of Joey Ramone)" | Danger Mouse, Paul Epworth |
| 2014 | U2 | Songs of Innocence | "Every Breaking Wave" | Danger Mouse, Declan Gaffney |
| 2014 | U2 | Songs of Innocence | "Song for Someone" | Flood |
| 2014 | U2 | Songs of Innocence | "Iris (Hold Me Close)" | Danger Mouse, Paul Epworth |
| 2015 | Ellie Goulding | Delirium | "Keep On Dancin" | |
| 2015 | Adele | 25 | "Remedy" | Adele Adkins |
| 2015 | Mikky Ekko | Time | "Love You Crazy" | Mikky Ekko, Noel Zancanella |
| 2015 | Mikky Ekko | Time | "Loner" | Mikky Ekko, Noel Zancanella |
| 2015 | Rob Thomas | The Great Unknown | "Trust You" | Rob Thomas, Noel Zancanella |
| 2016 | OneRepublic | Oh My My | "Let's Hurt Tonight" | Noel Zancanella |
| 2016 | OneRepublic | Oh My My | "Future Looks Good" | Brent Kutzle |
| 2016 | OneRepublic | Oh My My | "Oh My My" featuring (Cassius) | Brent Kutzle, Noel Zancanella |
| 2016 | OneRepublic | Oh My My | "Kids" | Brent Kutzle |
| 2016 | OneRepublic | Oh My My | "Dream" | Brent Kutzle, Noel Zancanella |
| 2016 | OneRepublic | Oh My My | "Choke" | Noel Zancanella |
| 2016 | OneRepublic | Oh My My | "A.I." (featuring Peter Gabriel) | Brent Kutzle, Steve Wilmot |
| 2016 | OneRepublic | Oh My My | "Better" | Brent Kutzle, Steve Wilmot, MojaveGhst |
| 2016 | OneRepublic | Oh My My | "Born" | Benny Blanco, Brent Kutzle, Noel Zancanella |
| 2016 | OneRepublic | Oh My My | "Fingertips" | Benny Blanco |
| 2016 | OneRepublic | Oh My My | "Human" | Noel Zancanella |
| 2016 | OneRepublic | Oh My My | "Lift Me Up" | Brent Kutzle |
| 2016 | OneRepublic | Oh My My | "Wherever I Go" | Brent Kutzle, Noel Zancanella |
| 2016 | OneRepublic | Oh My My | "All These Things" | Noel Zancanella |
| 2016 | OneRepublic | Oh My My | "Heaven" | Brent Kutzle |
| 2016 | OneRepublic | Oh My My | "Colors" | Brent Kutzle, Noel Zancanella |
| 2016 | OneRepublic | Oh My My | "The Less I Know" | |
| 2017 | OneRepublic | Non-album single | "No Vacancy" | Stargate |
| 2017 | Hailee Steinfeld | TBA | "Most Girls" | Zach Skelton and One Love |
| 2017 | Molly Kate Kestner | Non-album single | "It's You" | |
| 2017 | OneRepublic | Non-album single | "Truth to Power" | |
| 2017 | U2 | Songs of Experience | "You're the Best Thing About Me" | Jacknife Lee and Steve Lillywhite |
| 2017 | Rachel Platten | Waves | "Labels" | Zach Skelton |
| 2018 | X Ambassadors | TBA | "Don't Stay" | Zach Skelton |
| 2018 | Shawn Mendes | Shawn Mendes | "Particular Taste" | Shawn Mendes, Zach Skelton |
| 2018 | Paul McCartney | Egypt Station | "Fuh You" | Brandon Michael Collins, Zach Skelton, Paul McCartney |
| 2019 | Backstreet Boys | DNA | "Chances" | Stuart Crichton, Zack Skelton, Jamie Hartman |
| 2019 | Lil Nas X | 7 | "Bring U Down" | Zach Skelton |
| 2019 | Liam Payne | LP1 | "Say It All" | Stargate |
| 2021 | OneRepublic | Human | "Run" | Brent Kutzle, John Nathaniel, Tyler Spry |
| 2021 | OneRepublic | Human | "Distance" | Jason Evigan, Billboard, Brent Kutzle, |
| 2021 | OneRepublic | Human | "Someday" | Brent Kutzle, John Nathaniel |
| 2021 | OneRepublic | Human | "Didn't I" | Brent Kutzle, Tyler Spry, John Nathaniel |
| 2021 | OneRepublic | Human | "Rescue Me" | Brent Kutzle |
| 2021 | OneRepublic | Human | "Savior" | Brent Kutzle, Zach Skelton, Tyler Spry |
| 2021 | OneRepublic | Human | "Take Care of You" | Brent Kutzle, John Nathaniel |
| 2021 | OneRepublic | Human | "Forgot About You" | Louis Bell, Andrew Watt, Nick Mira |
| 2021 | OneRepublic | Human | "Somebody to Love" | Brent Kutzle, Andrew DeRoberts, Tyler Spry, John Nathaniel |
| 2021 | OneRepublic | Human | "Wanted" | Brent Kutzle, Tyler Spry, Steve Wilmot |
| 2021 | OneRepublic | Human | "Take It Out on Me" | BloodPop, Brent Kutzle, Tyler Spry, Brian Willett |
| 2021 | OneRepublic | Human | "Better Days" | Brent Kutzle, John Nathaniel |
| 2021 | OneRepublic | Human | "Wild Life" | Brent Kutzle, John Nathaniel, Tyler Spry |
| 2021 | OneRepublic | Human | "Ships + Tides" | Brent Kutzle, Brandon Collins |
| 2021 | OneRepublic | Human | "Lose Somebody" | Kyrre Gørvell-Dahll, Alexander Delicata, Alysa Vanderheym, Rissi |
| 2022 | DNCE | —N/a | "Move" | Andrew DeRoberts |
| 2022 | Anitta | Versions of Me | "Gata" (feat. Chencho Corleone) | |
| 2022 | Anitta | Versions of Me | "Turn It Up" | Mighty Mike, Andrés Torres, Mauricio Rengifo |
| 2022 | Anitta | Versions of Me | "Faking Love" (feat. Saweetie) | Andrés Torres, Mauricio Rengifo, Kuk Harrell |
| 2022 | Anitta | Versions of Me | "Me Gusta" (feat. Cardi B and Myke Towers) | Andrés Torres, Mauricio Rengifo, RDD |
| 2022 | Anitta | Versions of Me | "Lobby" (feat. Missy Elliott) | Zach Skelton |
| 2022 | John Legend | Legend | "Rounds" (feat. Rick Ross) | John Legend, Rogét Chahayed, Some Randoms, Andrew DeRoberts |
| 2022 | John Legend | Legend | "Waterslide" | Harv, Andrew DeRoberts |
| 2022 | John Legend | Legend | "Dope" (feat. JID) | Ian Kirkpatrick |
| 2022 | John Legend | Legend | "Guy Like Me" | Andrew DeRoberts |
| 2022 | John Legend | Legend | "Love" (feat. Jazmine Sullivan) | Pink Sweat$ |
| 2022 | John Legend | Legend | "All She Wanna Do" (feat. Saweetie) | The Monsters & Strangerz, Zach Skelton, Andrew DeRoberts |
| 2022 | John Legend | Legend | "Wonder Woman" | John Stephens, Connor McDonough, Ryan Daly |
| 2022 | John Legend | Legend | "Honey" (feat. Muni Long) | Harv, Tommy Brown, Mr. Franks, Michel "Lindgren" Schulz |
| 2022 | John Legend | Legend | "I Want You to Know" | Mr. Franks, Michel "Lindgren" Schulz, Di Genius |
| 2022 | John Legend | Legend | "The Other Ones" (feat. Rapsody) | Murda Beatz, Mr Hudson |
| 2022 | John Legend | Legend | "Good" (feat. Ledisi) | John Legend |
| 2022 | John Legend | Legend | "I Don't Love You Like I Used To" | Gian Stone, Michael Pollack |
| 2022 | Gryffin | Alive | "You Were Loved" (with OneRepublic) | Gryffin, Brent Kutzle |
| 2023 | Blackpink | | "The Girls" | Michel "Lindgren" Schulz |
| 2023 | Reneé Rapp featuring Megan Thee Stallion | Mean Girls | "Not My Fault" | Alexander 23, Jasper Harris, Jeff Richmond |
| 2023 | Taylor Swift | 1989 (Taylor's Version) | "Welcome to New York (Taylor's Version)" | Taylor Swift, Noel Zancanella |
| 2023 | Taylor Swift | 1989 (Taylor's Version) | "I Know Places (Taylor's Version)" | Taylor Swift, Noel Zancanella |
| 2024 | Justin Timberlake | Everything I Thought It Was | "Play" | Justin Timberlake, Danja, Federico Vindver, Andrew DeRoberts |
| 2024 | OneRepublic | Artificial Paradise | "Hurt" | Tyler Spry, Joe Henderson |
| 2024 | OneRepublic | Artificial Paradise | "I Ain't Worried" | Brent Kutzle, Simon Oscroft, Tyler Spry, John Nathaniel |
| 2024 | OneRepublic | Artificial Paradise | "West Coast" | Brent Kutzle, Mattman & Robin, John Nathaniel, Noel Zancanella |
| 2024 | OneRepublic | Artificial Paradise | "Sunshine" | Brent Kutzle, Simon Oscroft, Tyler Spry, Joe Henderson |
| 2024 | OneRepublic | Artificial Paradise | "Mirage" | Grant Boutin |
| 2024 | Lisa | Alter Ego | "Rockstar" | Sam Homaee |
| 2025 | Lisa | Alter Ego | "Rapunzel" (featuring Megan Thee Stallion) | Sam Homaee |
| 2025 | Lisa | Alter Ego | "Lifestyle" | Grant Boutin, Abby Keen, James Essein |
| 2025 | Tate McRae | So Close to What | "Miss Possessive" | Blake Slatkin |
| 2025 | Tate McRae | So Close to What | "2 Hands" | Lostboy |
| 2025 | Tate McRae | So Close to What | "Revolving Door" | Grant Boutin |
| 2025 | Tate McRae | So Close to What | "Dear God" | Grant Boutin |
| 2025 | Tate McRae | So Close to What | "Sports Car" | Grant Boutin |
| 2025 | Tate McRae | So Close to What | "I Know Love" (featuring The Kid Laroi) | Tyler Spry, Dopamine |
| 2025 | Tate McRae | So Close to What | "It's OK I'm OK" | Ilya Salmanzadeh |
| 2025 | Tate McRae | So Close to What | "No I'm Not in Love" | Lostboy |
| 2025 | Tate McRae | So Close to What | "Means I Care" | Rob Bisel |
| 2025 | Tate McRae | So Close to What | "Nobody's Girl" | Emile Haynie |
| 2025 | Tate McRae | So Close to What | "Tit for Tat" | Grant Boutin |
| 2025 | D4vd | Withered | "Is This Really Love?" | Tyler Spry |
| 2025 | Reneé Rapp | Bite Me | "Sometimes" | Omer Fedi, Alexander 23, Emile Haynie |
| 2025 | Jonas Brothers | Greetings from Your Hometown | "Waste No Time" | The Monsters & Strangerz |
| 2025 | Maroon 5 | Love Is Like (Deluxe Digital Edition) | "Cigarettes" | Noah Passovoy, Tyler Spry |
| 2025 | Jessie J | Don't Tease Me with a Good Time | "I'll Never Know Why" | Marty Maro |
| 2025 | Jessie J | Don't Tease Me with a Good Time | "Complicated" | |
| 2025 | Jessie J | Don't Tease Me with a Good Time | "Threw It Away" | Marty Maro |
| 2025 | Jessie J | Don't Tease Me with a Good Time | "California" | Marty Maro |
| 2025 | Jessie J | Don't Tease Me with a Good Time | "Living My Best Life" | Marty Maro |
| 2025 | Jessie J | Don't Tease Me with a Good Time | "H.A.P.P.Y" | Marty Maro |
| 2026 | BTS | Arirang | "Body to Body" | Picard Brothers, Diplo, Pdogg |
| 2026 | BTS | Arirang | "Normal" | Sean Cook |

== Soundtrack appearances ==
| Year | Song | Title | Notes |
|---|---|---|---|
| 2006 | "Strike" | Aquamarine (Music from the Motion Picture) | Co-writer and producer |
| 2006 | "I'mma Shine" | Step Up (Original Soundtrack) | Co-writer and producer |
| 2006 | "'Til the Dawn" | Step Up (Original Soundtrack) | Co-writer and producer |
| 2006 | "Made" | Step Up (Original Soundtrack) | Writer and producer |
| 2013 | "We Remain" | The Hunger Games: Catching Fire – Original Motion Picture Soundtrack | Co-writer and co-producer |
| 2014 | "Ordinary Human" | The Giver (Music Collection) | Writer and producer |
| 2016 | "Faith" | Sing: Original Motion Picture Soundtrack | Co-writer and producer |
| 2022 | "I Ain't Worried" | Top Gun: Maverick | Co-writer and producer |
| 2024 | "Not My Fault" | Mean Girls | Co-writer and producer |
| 2025 | "Lose My Mind" | F1 the Album | Co-writer and producer |
| 2025 | "Just Keep Watching" | F1 the Album | Co-writer and producer |
| 2025 | "Lucky" | Now You See Me: Now You Don't (Original Motion Picture Soundtrack) | Co-writer and producer |
