= The Voice of Albania (series 5) =

The fifth season of The Voice of Albania aired from 9 January 2016 to 16 April on Top Channel. The show is still hosted by Ledion Liço who has hosted the series since series one. Three judges have remained the same (Alma Bektashi, Sidrit Bejliri & Genc Salihu) while there is one new judge – Jonida Maliqi, Vodafone Albania continued to sponsor the series and used the slogan "Power to your Voice!"

== Blind auditions ==
Each coach has the length of the artists' performance to decide if they want that artist on their team. Should two or more coaches want the same artist, then the artist will choose their coach.

=== Episode 1 (9 January) ===
The series premiere was broadcast on 9 January 2016.

Colour key

✔	Coach hit his/her "I WANT YOU" button
	Artist defaulted to this coach's team
	Artist elected to join this coach's team
	Artist eliminated with no coach pressing his or her "I WANT YOU" button

Artist	Order	Age	Song	Coaches and artists choices			
Artist	Order	Age	Song	Alma	Sidrit	Genc	Jonida
Adion Skënderaj	01	N/A	"Grande Amore"		✔		
Qendrim Sahiti	02	22	"Story of My Life"				
Melisa Shoti	03	18	"Like I'm Gonna Lose You"				
Vilma Hoxha	04	30	"Battlefield"				
Sara Koçi	05	20	"Do It Like A Dude"	✔			✔
Redon Kika	06	18	"Hold Back The River"			✔	✔
Lorenc Hasrama	07	18	"Iven Flow"	✔	✔	✔	
Kaltrina Etemi	08	N/A	"Wings"	✔	✔	✔	✔
Jonathan Rodriguez	09	25	"El Perdón"				
Ina Torba	10	24	"Super Duper Love"	✔		✔	✔
Fjoralba Ponari	11	21	"Dark Horse"	✔	✔	✔	✔
Ermelinda Prifti	12	19	"Skyscraper"				
Erdi Tejeci	13	19	"One Last Breath"				
Almeida Malka	14	17	"Flashlight"	✔			
Aleksander Ypi	15	22	"Heaven"				

=== Episode 2 (11 January) ===
Artist	Order	Age	Song	Coaches and artists choices			
Artist	Order	Age	Song	Alma	Sidrit	Genc	Jonida
Silvi Mema	01	25	"Creep"		✔	✔	✔
Petro Pjetraj	02	19	"Drops of Jupiter"				
Kristi Skëndaj	03	18	"Blackbird"		✔		
Klaudia Salillari	04	20	"Empty Heart"	✔			
Filloreta Tafarshiku	05	21	"Certainly"				
Fatlume Mahmuti Selami	06	28	"I Have Nothing"				
Etmond Balazi	07	21	"Never Be Alone"				
Ernesa Surdulli	08	N/A	"You Oughta Know"	✔	✔	✔	✔
Elbunit Krasniqi	09	22	"Big Jet Plane"	✔	✔	✔	✔
Bletar Zeka	10	22	"Indian Summer"				
Blend Qerimi	11	N/A	"Thinking Out Loud"		✔		✔
Besarta Gashi	12	24	"You Lost Me"				
Besa Magjaraj	13	24	"Believe"				
Belindo Jangozi	14	22	"Adrienne (The Calling song)"				
Aurela Luka	15	19	"Lullaby of Birdland"				
Ardiana Mehmeti	16	17	"Decode"				✔
Anabela Zeka	18	N/A	"Undo"	✔			
Ana Bakaj	19	18	"Glitter In The Air"	✔	✔	✔	✔
Alberigo Marku	20	25	"Hero of War"		✔		

=== Episode 3 (16 January) ===
Artist	Order	Age	Song	Coaches and artists choices			
Artist	Order	Age	Song	Alma	Sidrit	Genc	Jonida
Vedat Kajtazi	01	N/A	"Incomplete"				
Tiri Gjoci	02	22	"The Thrill Is Gone"	✔	✔		✔
Taulant Sllamniku	03	18	"Redemption Song"				
Selma Malkaj	04	21	"Sirens"				
Mario Stafa	05	18	"Hey There"				
Maria Tika	06	N/A	"Flashdance... What a Feeling"				
Majlinda Cikaqi	07	18	"One Night Only"	✔	✔		
Ledmir Pecnikaj	08	N/A	"Someone New"			✔	✔
Julia Laze	09	23	"I Just Want To Make Love To You"	✔	✔	✔	
Kejsi Latifi	10	18	"Too Close"			✔	
Irvena Neli	11	23	"Human"				
Frosina Muji	12	16	"Lay Me Down"	✔			✔
Irisa	13	N/A	"Non è l'inferno"				
Evanthia Imeri	14	19	"I Knew You Were Trouble"	✔		✔	
Eraldo Breshani	15	N/A	"Broken Vow"				
Eleni Bella	16	17	"FU"				✔
Dea Grajqevci	17	19	"All I Want"		✔	✔	✔
Bleona Osmanaj	18	17	"It's Too Late"				
Benjamin Fazlliu	19	18	"Mirmëngjes"				
Andia Çarçiu	20	19	"The Climb"				

=== Episode 4 (18 January) ===
Artist	Order	Age	Song	Coaches and artists choices			
Artist	Order	Age	Song	Alma	Sidrit	Genc	Jonida
Xhuljana Allko	01	21	"Jar of Hearts"				
Sidorela Hamzallari	02	19	"Fix a Heart"				
Lirian Merturi	03	20	"Master Blaster (Jammin')"	✔			
Ledian Huna	04	22	"King"			✔	
Lidia Babasuli	05	20	"A Thousand Miles"				
Jurgon Ndoj	06	19	"I'm Not the Only One"				
Jonida Bajoxhiu	07	24	"Masterpiece"				
Frontina Krasniqi	08	17	"I Want You to Want Me"		✔		
Françeska Hoxhaj	09	19	"Hold On We're Going Home"	✔	✔		✔
Fiknete Krasniqi	10	18	"Runnin' (Lose It All)"				
Erlisa Shena	11	24	"This Ain't A Love Song"			✔	✔
Donika Domazeti	12	17	"R.I.P."	✔	✔		✔
Desaru Ndera	13	19	"Light Me Up"				
Denisa Begaj	14	18	"Only Love Can Hurt Like This"				
Anvi Mirikaj	15	27	"Stop and Stare"		✔		
Andi Nika	16	N/A	"Life of the Party"				✔

=== Episode 5 (23 January) ===
Artist	Order	Age	Song	Coaches and artists choices			
Artist	Order	Age	Song	Alma	Sidrit	Genc	Jonida
Xheni Pashollari	01	N/A	"Big Girls Cry"				
Sibora Sejdini	02	N/A	"Radioactive"				
Gigolia Haveriku	03	N/A	"L'amore non mi basta"	✔			
Xheraldina Ramiqi	04	18	"My Kind of Love"				
Shkamb Pozhegu	05	17	"Sunday Morning"		✔		
Sahit Vata	06	21	"Lay Me Down"	✔			✔
Romeo Musa	07	N/A	"Asgje njesoj"				
Rodolf Byku	08	17	"Stole the Show"	✔	✔	✔	✔
Qendresa Gashi	09	19	"Upside Down"				✔
Orhan Maliqi	10	25	"Drive"			✔	
Orges Dhima	11	18	"Drunk in Love"				✔
Najada Cenolli	12	19	"Soon We'll Be Found"	✔		✔	✔
Mario Alibashi	13	21	"Soldier"				✔
Mani Mehmeti	14	22	"Sugar"				
Klaudia Nderu	15	18	"Labyrinth"				
Kestrina Blakcori	16	17	"Dernière danse"				
Izaora Çollaku	17	20	"A Million Voices"				
Denisa Sadiku	18	18	"No Angel"	✔			✔
Besarb Qerimi	19	18	"As Long As You Love Me"				✔
Anxhela Baxhija	20	17	"This World"				

=== Episode 6 (25 January) ===
Artist	Order	Age	Song	Coaches and artists choices			
Artist	Order	Age	Song	Alma	Sidrit	Genc	Jonida
Sara Frisku	01	N/A	"Super Bass"				✔
Silva Palushani	02	18	"Titanium"				
Serxhio Hajdini	03	23	"Retrograde"	✔		✔	✔
Roland Gjoka	04	26	"Sono già solo"				✔
Nada Bregu	05	17	"No Boundaries"				
Mateus Cullhaj	06	21	"How to Save a Life"				
Marsela Xhemalaj	07	19	"Family Portrait"				
Kristina Rira	08	16	"Missed"	✔	✔	✔	✔
Kristina Leka	09	18	"New Love"	✔		✔	✔
Kleopatra Tuni	10	16	"Take Me to Church"				✔
Klea Kasemi	11	17	"Treasure"				
Iris Hoxha	12	N/A	"Sisters Are Doing It For Themselves"	✔			✔
Ilger Alliu	13	18	"Dancing On My Own"	✔	✔	✔	✔
Fabio Haxhiu	14	22	"Jealous"		✔		
Evisa Leshi	15	16	"Deeper"				
Elisabeta Brahja	16	17	"Yours"				
Argita Baci	17	22	"This World"	✔			✔

== Battle rounds ==
The battle rounds will consist of two 2 hour shows on 30 January and 20 February. In a change from previous series, the coaches' chairs will turn around after each performance to face away from the stage so that in the event of steal they turn back around to face the contestants.

Colour key

✔	Coach hit his/her "I WANT YOU" button
	Artist won the Battle and advanced to the Knockouts
	Artist lost the Battle but was stolen by another coach and advances to the Knockouts
	Artist lost the Battle and was eliminated

=== Episode 1 (30 January) ===
Order	Coach	Artists		Song	Coaches' and artists choices			
Order	Coach	Artists		Song	Sidrit	Alma	Jonida	Genc
1	Sidrit	Alberigo Marku	Lorenc Hasrama	"Old Time Rock And Roll"		✔		
2	Jonida	Sara Frisku	Sara Koçi	"Survivor"				
3	Alma	Almeida Malka	Sidit Vata	"Stitches"				
4	Genc	Redon Kika	Silvi Mema	"Party Girl"				
5	Genc	Kristi Skëndaj	Elbunit Krasniqi	"Molla E Parë"				
6	Alma	Klaudia Salillari	Iris Hoxha	"Amaranth"				
7	Jonida	Besarb Qerimi	Mario Alibashi	"Counting Stars"				

=== Episode 2 (6 February) ===
Order	Coach	Artists		Song	Coaches' and artists choices			
Order	Coach	Artists		Song	Sidrit	Alma	Jonida	Genc
1	Sidrit	Blend Qerimi	Fabio Haxhiu	"Too Close"				
2	Sidrit	Anvi Mirikaj	Tiri Gjoci	"Breakeven"				
3	Jonida	Andi Nika	Denisa Sadiku	"Broken Strings"				
4	Jonida	Roland Gjoka	Eleni Bella	"Love Me Like You Do"				
5	Alma	Ina Torba	Evanthia Imeri	"Mama's Broken Heart"				
6	Alma	Lirian Merturi	Frosina Muji	"We Both Know"				
7	Genc	Fjoralba Ponari	Kejsi Latifi	"You've Got The Love"	✔			

=== Episode 3 (13 February) ===
Order	Coach	Artists		Song	Coaches' and artists choices			
Order	Coach	Artists		Song	Sidrit	Alma	Jonida	Genc
1	Alma	Ilger Alliu	Argita Baci	"Marvin Gaye"				
2	Genc	Ernesa Surdulli	Qendresa Gashi	"C'mon Billy"				
3	Genc	Erlisa Shena	Serxhio Hajdini	"Everybody Here Wants You"				
4	Jonida	Orges Dhima	Françeska Hoxhaj	"Flashlight"				
5	Genc	Dea Grajqevci	Ledian Huna	"It Takes Two"				
6	Jonida	Rodolf Byku	Adriana Mehmeti	"Animals"				
7	Sidrit	Kaltrina Etemi	Ana Bakaj	"Masterpiece"			✔	

=== Episode 4 (20 February) ===
Order	Coach	Artists		Song	Coaches' and artists choices			
Order	Coach	Artists		Song	Sidrit	Alma	Jonida	Genc
1	Genc	Najada Cenolli	Orhan Maliqi	"Dance Me to the End of Love"				
2	Sidrit	Majlinda Cikaqi	Kristina Leka	"Addicted To You"				
3	Jonida	Kleopatra Tuni	Ledmir Pecnikaj	"Firestone"				
