= New Day (Tamar Kaprelian song) =

Single by Tamar Kaprelian

from the album Sinner or a Saint
- Released: US: May 29, 2009
- Length: 3:08
- Label: Interscope
- Songwriters: Tamar Kaprelian, WAX LTD
- Producer: WAX LTD

"New Day" is the lead single Tamar Kaprelian's debut album Sinner or a Saint. The song helped her gain mainstream popularity, and was released on May 29, 2009 through Interscope Records for download on iTunes.

== Track listing ==
All tracks are written by Tamar Kaprelian.

New Day Single
No.	Title	Length
1.	"New Day"	3:08

== Music video ==
Two versions of "New Day" video were produced.

The first version was directed by Ramon Boutviseth and Michael Gordon, it was released in 2009 and shows Tamar arriving from work, then playing the piano and singing, before looking at old pictures and putting away old stuff.

The second version was directed by Chis Sims and was released in 2010. It shows Tamar dreaming herself in a field full of pink flowers and in a dark forest. At the end of the video she wakes up dressed up with a gown.

== Media ==
"New Day" was featured in the fifth season finale of the hit MTV series The Hills, during the scene where lead cast member Lauren Conrad leaves the series. It was also featured in an episode of the hit ABC Family series The Secret Life of the American Teenager, during a party at the Bowmans' guesthouse. It was also used in the promos for ABC Family's Huge.

== Charts ==
Chart (2011)	Peak position
U.S. Billboard Adult Top 40	37

== Personnel ==
- Tamar Kaprelian - lead vocals
- Abe Laboriel Jr. - drums
- Chris Chaney - bass
- Jaime Muhoberac - Piano
- Bruce Driscoll, Wally Gagel - guitars

Production

- Produced by WAX LTD
- Mixed by Joe Zock
