= All of You (Colbie Caillat album) =

Studio album by Colbie Caillat
- Released: July 6, 2011
- Studios: Westlake Recording Studios (Los Angeles, California); Revolver Studios (Sherman Oaks, California); Patriot Studios (Denver, Colorado); Rocket Carousel Studios (Culver City, California); Henson Recording Studios (Hollywood, California); The Village Recorder (Los Angeles); Ken's Studio E (Los Angeles)
- Genres: Pop; pop rock; folk pop
- Length: 43:25
- Label: Universal Republic
- Producers: Colbie Caillat; Greg Wells; Ken Caillat; Ryan Tedder; Toby Gad; Jason Reeves; Rick Nowels

Colbie Caillat chronology
Breakthrough (2009)	All of You (2011)	Christmas in the Sand (2012)

Singles from All of You
- 1. "I Do" Released: February 7, 2011; 2. "Brighter Than the Sun" Released: May 23, 2011; 3. "Favorite Song" Released: May 8, 2012

All of You is the third studio album by American singer-songwriter Colbie Caillat. The album was scheduled to be released on May 3, 2011, but was pushed back by two months to a July 6, 2011, release in the United States through Universal Republic Records. Primarily produced by Greg Wells, the set features a guest appearance from rapper and actor Common on "Favorite Song" and includes songwriting contributions from Ryan Tedder, Toby Gad, Jason Reeves and Rick Nowels.

The album received generally favorable reviews, with critics praising Caillat's mature songwriting and upbeat arrangements, though some found its polished production too safe and stylistically familiar. Commercially, All of You debuted at number six on the US Billboard 200 with 70,000 first-week sales, becoming Caillat's third consecutive top-ten album in the United States, and achieved additional chart success in countries including Switzerland, Canada, and Germany.

The album's lead-single "I Do" was released on February 7, 2011, and peaked at number 23 on the US Billboard Hot 100 chart and at number 11 on the Adult Pop Songs, later earning Gold certification in the United States. A second single, "Brighter Than the Sun," was released on May 17, 2011, and became a number-one hit on Billboard's Adult Contemporary chart, eventually achieving Platinum certification. The album's third single, "Favorite Song," peaked at number 21 on the Adult Pop Airplay chart.

== Background ==
Caillat began recording All of You in 2010 in California, completing the album between tour dates later that year. Describing the project as a new chapter in her career, she said that while it retained the styles and sound of her previous albums Breakthrough and Coco, the record featured more experiences, new collaborators, and a more upbeat direction, calling it a "full-on summer album." The album includes songwriting contributions from Ryan Tedder, Toby Gad, Jason Reeves, and Rick Nowels, while Caillat co-wrote several tracks with her boyfriend, musician Justin Young. She described the collaboration as a rewarding experience, noting that writing songs about their relationship brought them closer together. Guitarist David Becker also contributed to five tracks on the album. The album features a guest appearance from rapper Common on "Favorite Song", a guitar-driven pop track that paired Caillat's vocals with Common's verses. The collaboration developed after the two artists met at a Grammy-related event in 2009, eventually leading to the song's creation. Caillat also expressed excitement about the track, describing it as an unexpected but successful pairing.

== Promotion and singles ==
All of You was preceded by three singles. The album's lead single, "I Do," was released on February 7, 2011. It received positive reviews from music critics and peaked at number 23 on the US Billboard Hot 100. The second single, "Brighter Than the Sun," was released on May 17, 2011, and reached number 47 on the chart. Following a fan vote hosted on Caillat's official website, "Favorite Song" was selected as the album's third single and released on May 8, 2012. The song received airplay on American radio stations and peaked at number 21 on the US Adult Pop Airplay chart. "Shadow" and "Before I Let You Go" were also considered as potential future singles, while another song, "What If," debuting at number 77 on the Billboard Hot 100, due to strong digital downloads on the week of the album release. Caillat further promoted All for You with performances on Today on July 12, 2011, and The Tonight Show with Jay Leno on July 14, 2011.

== Critical reception ==
Professional ratings
Aggregate scores
Source	Rating
Metacritic	72/100
Review scores
Source	Rating
About.com	4/5 stars
AllMusic	4/5 stars
Entertainment Weekly	B+
Los Angeles Times	2.5/4 stars
New York Post	4/4 stars
Slant Magazine	1.5/5 stars
Sputnikmusic	2.5/5 stars
USA Today	3.5/4 stars

At Metacritic, which assigns a normalized rating out of 100 to reviews from mainstream critics, the album received an average score of 72, based on 6 reviews, which indicates "generally favorable reviews." Stephen Thomas Erlewine of AllMusic described All of You as "easily [Caillat's] best record yet," praising its more energetic arrangements and noting that "she's not just strumming, she's swinging, sometimes urged along by handclaps." USA Today's Elysa Gardner also called it Caillat's "best album to date" and praised its buoyant, optimistic songs and more mature songwriting. Entertainment Weekly's Kyle Anderson also responded positively, writing that the album demonstrated "there's more to her than a smile and a hair toss" while commending its rhythmic variety and understated emotional depth. Gary Graff from Billboard found that All of You displayed "more wisdom, balance and musical maturity" than Caillat's previous works, while Bill Lamb of About.com praised its increased variety and stating that "on All of You the artistic achievement matches the commercial success." Dan Aquilante of The New York Post gave the album four out of four stars, praising its melodic arrangements, optimistic themes, and Caillat's progression as a songwriter.

Reviews were more divided elsewhere. Writing for The Los Angeles Times, Mikael Wood Mikael Wood gave the album two-and-a-half out of four stars, praising its polished production but arguing that some songs were so carefully crafted they lacked a lasting impact." The Stanford Daily praised Caillat's candid songwriting about "both the triumphs and the fears of a normal relationship" and her mature lyricism, while criticizing "Brighter Than the Sun" and "Favorite Song" as weaker attempts to broaden her sound. Chris Willman of The Chicago Tribune argued that Caillat's signature style remained difficult to escape, writing that her enduring "'Bubbly'-ness" made it easy to question "how easily the slightest sharp edge might pop the musical air ball in progress." Sputnikmusic described All of You as "her most inconsistent album," stating that although Caillat deserved credit for attempting to refresh her formula, "she falters more often than she succeeds." Mike Driver wrote that Caillat "never truly imposes herself as a solo artist worth investing fully in," praising her vocals but arguing that she lacked the impact of the strongest artists in the genre. Jaymie Baxley of Slant Magazine gave the album 1.5 out of 5 stars, criticizing it as "virtually indistinguishable from Caillat's previous work."

== Commercial performance ==
Released on July 12, 2011, All of You achieved moderate commercial success internationally. The album debuted and peaked at number six on the US Billboard 200 with first week sales of 70,000 copies, becoming Caillat's third consecutive top-ten album in the United States. It also managed to top the Digital Albums Chart. Elsewhere, it reached the top 10 on the Swiss Albums Chart (number seven) and the Canadian Albums Chart (number 10). The album also peaked at number 11 in Germany, number 20 in Norway, number 24 in Austria, and number 49 in Australia. Unlike her previous releases Coco and Breakthrough, which received multiple certifications, All of You did not receive any major certifications. By June 2014, All of You had sold 331,000 copies domestically, according to Nielsen SoundScan.

== Track listing ==
The track list was confirmed on the Billboard website, as well as AllMusic.

Track listing
No.	Title	Writer(s)	Producer(s)	Length
1.	"Brighter Than the Sun"	Colbie Caillat; Ryan Tedder	Tedder; Noel Zancanella	3:51
2.	"I Do"	Caillat; Toby Gad	Greg Wells	2:53
3.	"Before I Let You Go"	Caillat; Rick Nowels	Wells	3:35
4.	"Favorite Song" (featuring Common)	Caillat; Tedder; Lonnie Lynn Jr.	Tedder; Zancanella	3:46
5.	"What If"	Caillat; Nowels; Jason Reeves	John Shanks	3:45
6.	"Shadow"	Caillat; Justin Young	Caillat; Ken Caillat	3:20
7.	"Think Good Thoughts"	Caillat; Gad; Kara DioGuardi	Gad	4:01
8.	"Like Yesterday"	Caillat; Reeves; Young	Caillat; K. Caillat	3:27
9.	"All of You"	Caillat; Reeves	Caillat; K. Caillat	3:49
10.	"Dream Life, Life"	Caillat; Nowels	Wells	3:25
11.	"What Means the Most"	Caillat; Gad	Wells	3:27
12.	"Make It Rain"	Caillat	Caillat; K. Caillat	3:57
Total length:				43:25

iTunes and Japanese edition
No.	Title	Writer(s)	Producer(s)	Length
13.	"Stereo"	Caillat; Nathan Chapman	Chapman	3:16
14.	"Maria" (iTunes pre-order only)	Jimmy Destri	Wells	4:13

== Charts ==
=== Weekly charts ===
Chart (2011)	Peak position
Australian Albums (ARIA)	49
Austrian Albums (Ö3 Austria)	24
Belgian Albums (Ultratop Flanders)	78
Belgian Albums (Ultratop Wallonia)	61
Canadian Albums (Billboard)	10
Dutch Albums (Album Top 100)	55
French Albums (SNEP)	63
German Albums (Offizielle Top 100)	11
Japan Hot Albums (Billboard Japan)	89
Japanese Albums (Oricon)	106
Norwegian Albums (VG-lista)	20
South Korean International Albums (Gaon)	10
Polish Albums (OLiS)	45
Swiss Albums (Schweizer Hitparade)	7
US Billboard 200	6

=== Year-end charts ===
Chart (2011)	Position
US Billboard 200	163

== Release history ==
Region	Date	Label(s)	Format(s)	Ref.
Japan	July 6, 2011	Universal Music Japan	CD; digital download	
United Kingdom	July 11, 2011	Island	CD; digital download	
United States	July 12, 2011	Universal Republic	CD; digital download	
