= Touch Me (Smash song) =

Single by Smash cast feat. Katharine McPhee

from the album The Music of Smash
- Released: 2012
- Genre: Dance-pop
- Length: 3:50
- Label: Columbia
- Songwriters: Ryan Tedder; Bonnie McKee

Smash cast singles chronology
"On Lexington & 52nd Street"	"Touch Me"	"Don't Forget Me"

"Touch Me" is an original song introduced in the eighth episode of the first season of the musical TV series Smash, entitled "The Coup". It is written by Ryan Tedder and Bonnie McKee. In the show's universe, the song is written by Tedder, who plays himself.

In the episode, because there are problems with the storyline for the Bombshell musical about Marilyn Monroe, choreographer and director Derek Wills (Jack Davenport) and producer Eileen Rand (Anjelica Huston) seek a new direction for the show without telling songwriting duo Tom Levitt (Christian Borle) and Julia Houston (Debra Messing). Derek enlists Karen Cartwright (Katharine McPhee) to work with him. He has gotten Tedder to write a song that shows a more contemporary and edgy side of Marilyn Monroe, and Karen, with dancers enlisted by Derek, along with Tedder and his band, performs the song in front of Tom and Julia, on a bed and wrapped in a bedsheet while dancers playing paparazzi swirl around her.

The song is on the cast album The Music of Smash.

As of May 9, 2012, the song had sold 18,000 digital copies.

== Production ==
Tedder made a cameo on the series in "The Coup" as himself and within the show gives the song to Karen to perform after Derek (Jack Davenport) asks him to and work on the Marilyn Monroe project for him.

The scene, described by The Smoking Gun, is as follows: "Karen appears wrapped in a white sheet, singing and thrashing while surrounded by masked men. By the end of the song, she's completely caged in and looks a bit like a 'scared bird'".

The Hollywood Reporter suggested that the spot, which first aired during the Super Bowl, was deliberately seductive (e.g. with McPhee only wearing a sheet) in "an attempt to entice male viewers".

== Critical reception ==
Prior to its release, the song drew comparisons with the Max Martin-produced Glee song "Loser Like Me" which peaked at #6 on the Hot 100.

Sam Lansky of MTV Buzzworthy said that the song serves as a reminder "of just how killer Katharine McPhee's vocals really are as well as her not-insignificant contribution to the realm of popular music". Although Entertainment Weekly called "Touch Me" "empty, generic electro-garbage", PopCrush declared it a "dancefloor-ready" number, "a slice of synth pop that finds plenty of effects lacing McPhee's vocals". They referred to this version of Karen as "RoboMcPhee", due to the "studio treatment on her voice as she delivers parts of the sexified lyrics in robot fashion", and concluded by saying "the song evolves into an EDM epic that should have fans putting their drinks down so they can shake their things while unencumbered on the dance floor".

== Charts ==
The song peaked at #4 on the Hot Dance Club Songs chart.

Chart (2012)	Peak position
US Hot Dance Club Songs (Billboard)	4
US Pop Digital Songs (Billboard)	41

== Release history ==
Region	Date	Format	Label
United States	May 1, 2012	Digital download - digital album	Columbia Records
