= Justin Young =

Justin Young may refer to:

- Justin Young (singer, born 1978), American singer
- Justin Young (singer, born 1987), English singer, lead singer in The Vaccines
- Justin Robert Young (born 1983), podcaster, journalist, comedian and writer
- Justin Young (basketball), professional basketball player for Thang Long Warriors
