= Sinner or a Saint =

Studio album by Tamar Kaprelian
- Released: August 24, 2010
- Recorded: 2010
- Genre: Pop
- Length: 43:22
- Label: Interscope
- Producer: WAX LTD

Singles from Sinner or a Saint
- 1. "New Day" Released: May 29, 2009

Sinner or a Saint is the first studio album by Armenian American singer-songwriter Tamar Kaprelian, it was released on August 24, 2010.

Professional ratings
Review scores
Source	Rating
Allmusic	3.5/5 stars

== Promotion ==
The first single "New Day" was available for download on iTunes on May 29, 2009. Then it was featured on the mid-season 5 finale of MTV's series "The Hills". On May 7, 2010 the music video was released via Vevo.

"Delicate Soul" was available for download on iTunes on August 25, 2009, it was released as a promotional single only.

Tamar Kaprelian also made a video for the song "Purified" it was premiered on her YouTube account and was just released as a promotional video single.

== Track listing ==
No.	Title	Writer(s)	Length
1.	"New Day"	Tamar Kaprelian, Wax Ltd, Joy Williams, Ben Glover & Jason Ingram	3:07
2.	"Sinner or a Saint"	Ryan Tedder, Brent Kutzle & Tamar Kaprelian	3:49
3.	"Delicate Soul"	Tamar Kaprelian	3:41
4.	"Raining In Paradise"	Tamar Kaprelian	4:34
5.	"Should Have Known Better"	Tamar Kaprelian, Wax Ltd.	3:55
6.	"March Mornings"	Tamar Kaprelian	3:11
7.	"Transcend"	Tamar Kaprelian & Xandy Barry	3:12
8.	"Raw"	Tamar Kaprelian, Shelly Peiken, Wax Ltd.	3:49
9.	"Purified"	Tamar Kaprelian & Xandy Barry	4:19
10.	"The Otherside (Aleatory)"	Tamar Kaprelian & Xandy Barry	6:22
11.	"New Day (Acoustic)"	Tamar Kaprelian, Wax Ltd, Joy Williams, Ben Glover & Jason Ingram	3:23
Total length:			43:22
