= What If (Colbie Caillat song) =

Promotional single by Colbie Caillat

from the album Letters to Juliet and All of You
- Studio: Henson Recording Studios (Los Angeles, CA)
- Genre: Pop
- Length: 3:45
- Label: Universal Republic
- Songwriters: Caillat, Rick Nowels, Jason Reeves
- Producer: John Shanks

"What If" is a song recorded by American recording artist Colbie Caillat. It was written by Caillat, Rick Nowels and Jason Reeves, and produced by John Shanks. The song was released as a promotional single from the soundtrack of the film Letters to Juliet and later was included on her third studio album All of You.

== Background and reception ==
"What If" was included on the soundtrack of the film Letters to Juliet, on May 14, 2011 as a "brand new track", alongside her other song "You Got Me", which is on her second album Breakthrough. Only, on July 12, 2011, the song was included on her third studio album All of You. Gary Graff wrote for Billboard that "it's hard to not appreciate the smooth craft of the song".

== Chart performance ==
Due to strong digital downloads when the album was released, the song debut at number 47 on the Hot Digital Songs chart and at number 77 on the Billboard Hot 100.

== Charts ==
Chart (2011)	Peak position
US Billboard Hot 100	77
