= I Do (Colbie Caillat song) =

2011 single by Colbie Caillat

- Single cover

Single by Colbie Caillat

from the album All of You
- Released: February 7, 2011
- Recorded: 2010
- Studio: Rocket Carousel Studios (Culver City, CA)
- Genre: Folk; pop
- Length: 2:54
- Label: Universal Republic
- Songwriters: Colbie Caillat; Toby Gad
- Producer: Greg Wells

Colbie Caillat singles chronology
"I Never Told You" (2010)	"I Do" (2011)	"Brighter Than the Sun" (2011)

Music video
- "I Do" on YouTube

"I Do" is a song recorded by American recording artist Colbie Caillat. It was written by Caillat and Toby Gad, and produced by Greg Wells. The song was released as the first single from her third studio album All of You (2011). The song was released to iTunes and radios on February 7, 2011 through Universal Republic. Musically, the song is an upbeat "sunny-day" pop song, and the lyrics speak about taking relationships further, like marriage. "I Do" debuted at number 38 on the Billboard Adult Pop Songs chart. It later debuted at number 23 on the Billboard Hot 100. According to Nielsen Soundscan, it has sold about 154,000 copies in the US. The music video for "I Do" premiered on March 11, 2011.

== Composition ==
"I Do" (2011)
A 17-second sample from Colbie Caillat's "I Do". The song follows an acoustic instrumentation with "shuffling beats" and makes use of ukulele.

"I Do" was released on February 7, 2011 as the lead single from her upcoming third studio album All of You. It was written by Caillat and Toby Gad, and produced by Greg Wells. The song is an upbeat folk pop song with acoustic influences, whose lyrics, according to Caillat, speak about marriage. Brian Voerding of AOL Radio noted that the background vocals are weaved across the auxiliary percussion beats, and Caillat sings the lines with brief pauses. John Hill of About.com wrote that "I Do" maintains the sound of Caillat's previous works, and includes an acoustic arrangement, with shuffling beats. He also commented that the song deals with the protagonist wanting to spend the rest of her life with the one she loves. The song also uses ukulele as an instrument, which Hill thought fitted "perfectly and adds an additional layer of fun to an already upbeat song."

== Reception ==
Brian Voerding wrote that "Caillat develops a smart and uncomplicated sound in the upbeat, sunny-day song." Amy Sciarretto of Artistdirect wrote that the song was "easy, breezy," and boasts a "massive hook" that would "embed itself in to [your] brain." John Hill wrote that Caillat has a "winner hands down" with "I Do". Jason Lipshutz of Billboard called the song "breezy". Mikael Wood wrote for Los Angeles Times that "When Caillat and her partners are at their best on “All of You” — as in the limpid “I Do,” one of several songs that the singer says documents her ongoing relationship with her guitarist — you buy the hocus-pocus without regret." Bill Lamb from About.com says that: "Beyond the irresistible, almost delirious love expressed in the finger-snapping hit single "I Do," nearly all the songs here could stand on their own as a hit single.

== Music video ==
The video, directed by Ethan Lader, premiered on March 11, 2011 and follows the song’s spirit as the singer lounges around her house while declaring her love. Pareidolic faces are a recurring motif throughout the video. Caillat told PopEater about the clip: "The video is me waking up in bed and singing the song. I'm thinking about that guy and then I'm going and doing stuff around the house, and everything in my house kind of portrays the way I'm feeling. There's an alarm clock that you see a smiley face on, and you see a hanger on the door and somehow the door knob and the hanger look like they're smiling. It's all these cool little things when I'm walking around my house. I play with my dog, I start singing to my dog because I'm so happy and giddy. It shows the real moments of when you're not with that person, when you're thinking about them and knowing that you're ready to tell them that you love them." Caillat did get miffed at the way video directors were interpreting the song. She told AOL: "Every single director who sent treatments in [made it] all [about a] wedding dress, or me at the altar or me dreaming about a wedding. And I was like, 'No. Come on, if you understood the song then you'd know it wasn't about that.'" TJ wrote for NeonLimelight that "she has a spring in her step and a smile on her face thanks to the love of her life she’s thinking about taking a trip down the aisle with in the happy-go-lucky clip, and she inspires everyone — and everything — to turn their frowns upside down."

== Chart performance ==
"I Do" debuted at number 38 on the Billboard Adult Pop Songs chart, the week dated February 12, 2011. It has reached a position of 24 on the same. The song later debuted at number 23 on the Billboard Hot 100. According to Nielsen Soundscan, "I Do" has sold about 354,000 copies in the US. It also re-entered the Hot 100 at #97 and has reached #75.

== Charts ==
=== Weekly charts ===
Chart (2011)	Peak position
Austria (Ö3 Austria Top 40)	30
Belgium (Ultratip Bubbling Under Flanders)	14
Belgium (Ultratip Bubbling Under Wallonia)	18
Canada AC (Billboard)	41
Canada Hot AC (Billboard)	42
Germany (GfK)	33
Hungary (Editors' Choice Top 40)	29
German Airplay Chart	2
Japan Hot 100 (Billboard)	10
US Billboard Hot 100	23
US Adult Pop Airplay (Billboard)	7
US Adult Contemporary (Billboard)	26

=== Year-end charts ===
Chart (2011)	Position
US Adult Top 40 (Billboard)	39

== Certifications ==
Region	Certification	Certified units/sales
Brazil (Pro-Música Brasil)	Platinum	60,000^{‡}
United States (RIAA)	Gold	500,000^{*}
^{*} Sales figures based on certification alone.^{‡} Sales+streaming figures based on certification alone.
