= Letters to Juliet =

2010 American romantic drama film directed by Gary Winick

- Theatrical release poster
- Directed by: Gary Winick
- Written by: José Rivera; Tim Sullivan
- Produced by: Caroline Kaplan; Ellen Barkin; Mark Canton
- Starring: Amanda Seyfried; Christopher Egan; Gael García Bernal; Vanessa Redgrave; Franco Nero
- Cinematography: Marco Pontecorvo
- Edited by: Bill Pankow
- Music by: Andrea Guerra
- Production company: Applehead Pictures
- Distributed by: Summit Entertainment
- Release dates: April 25, 2010 (Tribeca Film Festival); May 14, 2010 (United States)
- Running time: 105 minutes
- Country: United States
- Languages: English; Italian; Spanish
- Budget: $30 million
- Box office: $80 million

Letters to Juliet is a 2010 American romantic comedy-drama film starring Amanda Seyfried, Christopher Egan, Gael García Bernal, Vanessa Redgrave and Franco Nero. This was the final film of director Gary Winick before his death on February 27, 2011.

The plot revolves around the engaged Sophie finding, during her pre-honeymoon in Verona, a 50-year-old unanswered letter seeking for love advice from Juliet. Answering it leads to the recipient Claire showing up alongside her grumpy grandson Charlie, and the trio search for the old long-lost love while new love sparks.

The film was released theatrically in North America and other countries on May 14, 2010. The idea for the film was inspired by the 2006 non-fiction book Letters to Juliet, by Lise Eve Friedman and Ceil Jann Friedman, which chronicles the phenomenon of letter-writing to Shakespeare's most famous romantic character.

== Plot ==
Sophie is a young American woman who works for The New Yorker as a fact checker. She goes on a pre-honeymoon with her chef fiancé Victor to Verona, Italy. He is unmoved by the romance of Italy and monopolizes the holiday by using his time constructively to conduct research for his soon-to-open restaurant, neglecting and ignoring Sophie's interests, feelings and opinions.

As Sophie explores Verona, she learns that thousands of "letters to Juliet" are left in Juliet's courtyard each year, written by women from all over the world seeking comfort and advice in love; the letters are collected and answered by a group called the "Secretaries of Juliet". Intrigued, Sophie asks to join them.

Sophie later discovers an unanswered letter from a young girl named Claire Smith written in 1957, begging Juliet for guidance on her relationship with a boy named Lorenzo Bartolini. On a whim, Sophie answers the letter, and within a few days the now elderly Claire arrives in Verona with her barrister grandson Charlie. The two women take an instant liking to each other, while Sophie and Charlie do not get along.

Claire reveals that in her youth, she made plans to run away with Lorenzo but then stood him up out of fear. While she eventually married another man, she never forgot him. Now widowed, Claire has decided to follow the advice given in Sophie's reply and seek out her long-lost love, despite Charlie's objections.

Sophie goes along with them, hoping Claire's story might kickstart her writing career and is genuinely interested in the story's outcome. Discovering there are seventy-four Lorenzo Bartolinis in the area, the trio decides to visit as many as possible in the hope of finding the right one. During this time, Sophie and Charlie grow closer.

After many days of searching, they find one Lorenzo who has died, saddening Claire. A frustrated Charlie lashes out at Sophie and accuses her of not knowing what real loss is. Claire, witnessing the dispute, tells Charlie that Sophie's mother had walked out on her when she was a little girl and insists that he apologize. The following day, Sophie talks to Charlie about love and her belief that Claire's Lorenzo is still alive, and they share a kiss, although she quickly pulls away.

On their last day of searching, having accepted that their quest will likely be in vain, Claire points out a vineyard and asks to stop so they can have a farewell drink for Sophie. As Charlie drives down the road, Claire spots a young man who looks exactly like her Lorenzo. They discover he is the grandson of the Lorenzo they have been seeking and that the Bartolini family owns the vineyard they have come to visit.

Claire and Lorenzo are finally reunited. So, the group spends the afternoon at Lorenzo's home, sharing a meal with the extended Bartolini family while Claire and Lorenzo, also widowed, happily reconnect. Later, as Sophie heads back to Verona, Claire pushes Charlie to pursue her, but he backs off when he sees Sophie with Victor.

Back in New York, Sophie's editor at The New Yorker is impressed by her story and agrees to print it. Exhausted by their differences and lack of passion in their relationship, Sophie breaks up with Victor. Then she returns to Verona to attend Claire and Lorenzo's wedding.

During the reception, Claire reads out loud Sophie's reply to her original "letter to Juliet" that set the events in motion, but Sophie runs out crying after seeing Charlie with a woman called Patricia, which he had mentioned was his ex-girlfriend's name. Charlie goes after Sophie and finds her standing on a balcony above him, where she admits she loves him but tells him to go back to his girlfriend.

Charlie reveals that this Patricia is his cousin, not his girlfriend, and tells Sophie he loves her back. He climbs up the vine to the balcony, recreating the famous scene from Romeo and Juliet, but accidentally falls. So, they kiss as he lies on the ground and Claire, Lorenzo, and the wedding guests come to see what happened.

== Cast ==
- Amanda Seyfried as Sophie Hall, a fact checker living in New York
- Christopher Egan as Charlie Wyman, Claire's loyal grandson, who has trouble coming to terms with his grandmother loving anyone other than his late grandfather. His parents died in a car crash.
- Gael García Bernal as Victor, Sophie's hard-working chef fiancé who is easily preoccupied with anything having to do with food, cooking, and the opening of his restaurant.
- Vanessa Redgrave as Claire Smith, the woman who wrote the letter to Juliet 50 years before, and is quixotically hoping to find her Lorenzo.
- Franco Nero as Lorenzo Bartolini, Claire's love interest. Nero is Redgrave's real life husband. Roger Ebert, having interviewed both Nero and Redgrave on the set of Camelot in 1966 – where they met, fell in love, separated, then married 40 years later – noted how much of the love story between their characters is nearly autobiographical.
- Luisa Ranieri as Isabella, one of the four original Juliet's secretaries
- Marina Massironi as Francesca, one of Juliet's secretaries.
- Milena Vukotic as Maria, one of Juliet's secretaries.
- Luisa De Santis as Angelina, Isabella's mother.
- Lidia Biondi as Donatella, one of Juliet's secretaries.
- Daniel Emilio Baldock as Lorenzo Bartolini II, it's Lorenzo's Son
- Stefano Guerrni as Lorenzo Bartolini III, Lorenzo I's grandson and Lorenzo II's son, who catches Claire's attention as he looks like Lorenzo once did.

In addition, Oliver Platt briefly appears as Sophie's boss in New York, while Stefano Guerrini makes a brief appearance.

== Release and reception ==
=== Critical reception ===
Letters to Juliet received mixed reviews from critics. Review aggregate Rotten Tomatoes reported that the film has an approval rating of 42% based on 161 reviews, with an average rating of 5.2/10. The site's critical consensus reads: "Letters to Juliet has a refreshingly earnest romantic charm, but it suffers from limp dialogue and an utter lack of surprises." Metacritic gives it an average score of 50 out of 100 based on 34 critics, indicating "mixed or average" reviews. Audiences polled by CinemaScore gave the film an average grade of "A-" on an A+ to F scale.

The Guardian's Peter Bradshaw called the film "cheerfully ridiculous", pointing out the differing accents from both Amanda Seyfried and Christopher Egan, but gave praise to Vanessa Redgrave for a "likably, if not quite intentionally mad performance." Amy Biancolli of the San Francisco Chronicle was also positive towards Redgrave, describing her performance as being "elegant, clear-eyed and nurturing" and noting that she "commands the corniest dialogue to stand up and sound like poetry." Elizabeth Weitzman of the New York Daily News praised both Redgrave and Seyfried, saying the former brings "a lovely gravity to the lightweight proceedings" and the latter displays "an unusually levelheaded presence." Roger Ebert, said it had "unimaginably beautiful shots of the Italian countryside" and, aware of the film's genre and how it operates, gave it three out of four stars: "I know the ending is preordained from the setup. I know the characters are broad and comforting stereotypes. In this case, I simply don't care. Sometimes we have personal reasons for responding to a film."

Bill Gibron from PopMatters criticized the film for having two conflicting stories where only one is interesting, characters that make idiotic decisions for the plot to progress and have little romantic chemistry together that results in a lack of emotional resonance for the viewers, saying that "Letters to Juliet loses on all counts. It's not a comedy. It's barely romantic, and even the scenery looks filtered through a couple dozen attempts at post-production color timing (no nation is this…golden)." Nick Schager of Slant Magazine was negative towards its "cornball fairy-tale romanticism", criticizing the performances of Seyfried and Egan for having "a prototypically bland rom-com heroine" and being "laughably phony" in the material both given respectively, and found the plot to be of "dime store novel-quality."

=== Box office ===
Letters to Juliet opened at #3 to $13,540,486 behind Iron Man 2's second weekend and Robin Hood. In its second weekend, the film dropped 33.5% with $9,006,266 and with the arrival of Shrek Forever After the film slipped to #4. The film eventually grossed $53,032,453 domestically and $79,181,750 worldwide.

== Soundtrack ==
- "You Got Me" – Colbie Caillat
- "Chianti Country" – Reg Tilsley (composer)
- "Verona" – Andy Georges
- "Un giorno così" – 883
- "Per avere te" – Franco Morselli
- "Quando, quando, quando" – Laura Jane (as Lisa Jane) and Chris Mann
- "Variations on a Theme by Mozart" – from The Magic Flute, Opus 9
- "Sospesa" – Malika Ayane and Pacifico
- "Per dimenticare" – Zero Assoluto
- "Sono bugiarda (I'm a Liar)" – Caterina Caselli
- "Guarda che luna" – Fred Buscaglione
- "Love Story" – Taylor Swift
- "What If" – Colbie Caillat
