= Favorite Song (Colbie Caillat song) =

Single by Colbie Caillat featuring Common

from the album All of You
- Released: May 8, 2012
- Studio: Patriot Studios (Denver, CO); Henson Recording Studios (Los Angeles, CA); The Village Recorder (Los Angeles, CA)
- Genre: Pop; hip hop; reggae
- Length: 3:47 (album version)
- Label: Universal Republic
- Songwriters: Colbie Caillat; Ryan Tedder; Lonnie Rashid Lynn Jr.
- Producer: Tedder

Colbie Caillat singles chronology
"Brighter Than the Sun" (2011)	"Favorite Song" (2012)	"Christmas in the Sand" (2012)

Common singles chronology
"Ghetto Dreams" (2011)	"Favorite Song" (2012)	"Switch Up" (2013)

Music video
- "Favorite Song" on YouTube

"Favorite Song" is a song by American recording artist Colbie Caillat. It was written by Caillat and Ryan Tedder, and produced by Tedder and it features American rapper Common. The song was released as the third single from her third studio album All of You (2011). it was released on May 8, 2012. Musically, the song is a guitar-driven pop, hip-hop jam, and the lyrics speak about being in love with someone and desiring that the person feels the same. The song is a metaphor for wanting to be the object of someone’s affection.

The song received mixed reviews, some critics commended the track for having a "summer and island vibe", but some others dismissed Common's appearance and the chorus. They performed the track for the first time on The Ellen DeGeneres Show. The music video for the song was released on May 3, 2012. The video was filmed outdoors by the beach and palm trees of Venice, California. In the video, the two singers, along with other party people, take over the streets and skate parks of the ocean walk. Teenagers rocked bikinis and rollerblades as Common rapped away before the sunset.

== Background and release ==
"I've loved Common's music for years," Caillat says of the unlikely pairing, which was put into motion when the two artists met each other at an event for the Grammys in 2009. "He ended up singing his song 'The Light,' and he needed a girl singer [for the chorus] and I was like, 'I know it!' Afterward he was like, "I love your song and I love your voice.' It took about a year for us to get something together, but it worked out better than we could have imagined."

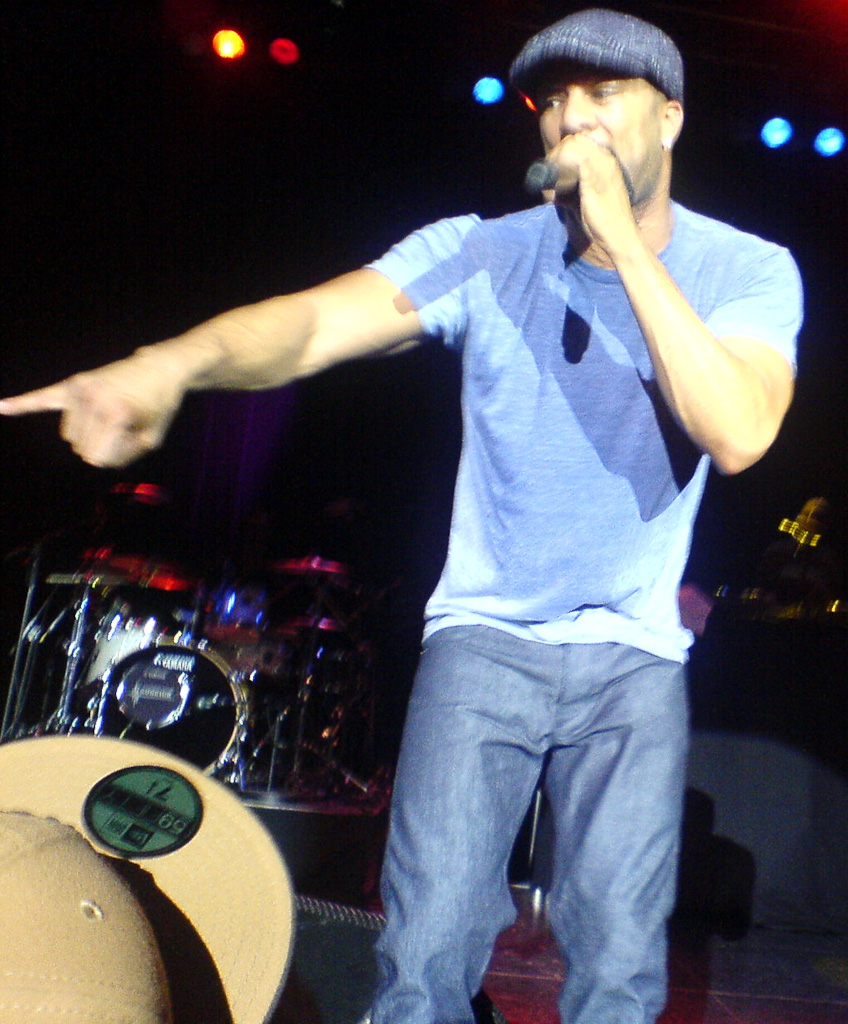
American hip-hop artist Common is featured on the track.

At the Universal Republic website, it was initiated a poll to decide the third single of the album. Later, she announced that Favorite Song was chosen as the third single. On April 6, Caillat and Common performed the song for the first time ever on The Ellen DeGeneres Show.

== Composition and lyrics ==
"Favorite Song" is a guitar-driven pop song, written by Caillat and co-written and produced by Ryan Tedder. It features the American rapper Common. The song is different from Caillat's usual sound, being considered a hip-hop jam.

The song is a metaphor for wanting to be the object of someone’s affection. Colbie sings, "I’ll be the thing that you want to sing back / Stuck in your head like I knew you would." In the sing-a-long chorus, she sings: “I want to be your favorite song/ You can turn it up/ Turn me on all night long/ I want to be your favorite song/ La-la-la-la, la-la-la / I want to be your melody/ Going through your head when you think of me/ I want to be your favorite song/ La-la-la-la.” Meanwhile, Common’s lyrics are softhearted as he tries his hand at crooning. “Girl the songs you sing / They my favorite things / You stay in my dreams / Something so supreme,” he warbles. Later, he raps: “We stay in tune with each other / And in our room we will discover / New ways to do covers / No matter how they dub us / We should stay true to the trust / And the winner of the best duo/ Is us.”

== Critical reception ==
Bill Lamb wrote for About.com that the song "is bright, summery, and it is utterly charming". Mike Diver from BBC Music wrote that the song has "a Bruno Mars-style summertime vibe to it, and the rapper is a reliable presence on any recording." Kyle Anderson from Entertainment Weekly called it "an island groove". Melinda Newman from HitFix wrote that "she shakes things up a little with the track and Common’s gruff rap proves the perfect foil to Caillat’s smooth, Sheryl Crow-redolent vocals." Trent Fitzgerald wrote a positive review for "Pop Crush", stating that " is the two-time Grammy-winner’s metaphoric love ditty that features playful electric guitars and feel-good lyrics." He also wrote that it "is the perfect sunshine-y ballad for the summer and it will most likely do well on Hot Adult Contemporary radio." Michelle Thompson wrote a positive review for The Tune, writing that on the album, the song "stands out the most with an absolutely infectious melody and hook, this is the track that will have you dancing nonstop, and it might get stuck in your head for a long while." Idolator staff wrote that "With a sweetly strummed guitar groove, charming reliance on la la’s and woo-hoo’s, and riding-in-a-car-with-the-top-down rhythm, 'Favorite Song' is instantly recognizable as a Colbie Caillat hit-in-the-making and Common lends a little hip-hop credibility to the track, offering three rhymed verses plus a little sing-song help later on."

Jaymie Baxley wrote an extense review for Slant Magazine, declaring that "the appearance of Common on 'Favorite Song' does threaten to disrupt business as usual. In fact, the harsh strums of electric guitar that preface the rapper's unexpected guest turn seem obstinately placed there to alert the listener of the ostensibly provocative rap verse to follow. But then Common starts dispensing bars of clumsy, musical-themed innuendo; it becomes clear that the song is just as bland and inoffensive as the rest of the album and those guitars were merely a tease. And the chorus is laughably unsexy: 'I want to be your favorite song/You can turn it up, play me all night long'." Another negative review came from Sputnikmusic, who wrote that "Caillat concocts what is quite possibly her cheesiest chorus yet, and it probably goes without saying that Common sounds sorely out of place. It is actually kind of reminiscent of those old-school Radio Disney songs that would mimic the melody of some major hit, make it a thousand times cheesier, and then have a rapper enter midway through to appeal to the “new, hip generation.” Needless to say, Colbie’s hip-hop experiment ends in futility." Andrea Hinton from Stanford Daily wrote that the song "has Caillat almost yelling during the grating chorus and, along with an unbelievably underwhelming contribution from rapper Common, seems out of place in the album."

== Chart performance ==
The song debuted at number forty on the Adult Pop Songs chart. It later, climbed to number thirty-five. In the third week, it reached a peak of number twenty-nine. In the fourth week, the song reached number twenty-seven. The song ultimately peaked at number 21.

== Music video ==
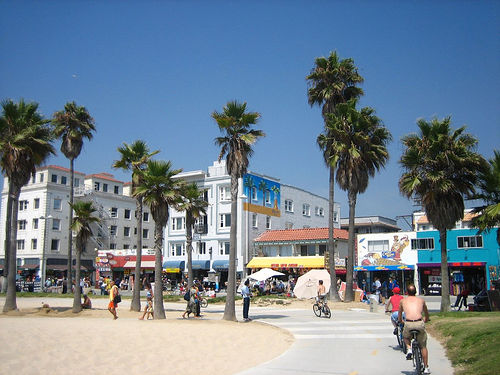
The music video was filmed on the Venice beach in California.

A music video for the song was shot on March 29, 2012 on the beach in Venice, California. The singer posted a photo from herself and Common on the set of the music video.

Colbie spoke about the video in an interview:

"It’s a really cool concept. Common and I are singing on the rooftop of this house, overlooking the beach in Venice [California]. Basically the music travels down throughout the town and though the beach. It hits everyone and they all start singing it, and these people in their bathing suits walking on the boardwalk or guys on skateboards, they all find the music and come up to me and Common on the rooftop and watch us perform for them."

The music video premiered on May 2, 2012. It is "a bright, beach-set" video that features Caillat and Common bopping around young beautiful people shooting hoops, skateboarding, catching rays and walking on the Venice boardwalk.

== Charts ==
Chart (2012)	Peak position
US Adult Pop Airplay (Billboard)	21
