= Brighter Than the Sun =

2011 single by Colbie Caillat

Single by Colbie Caillat

from the album All of You
- Released: May 23, 2011
- Studio: Westlake Recording Studios (Los Angeles, CA); Revolver Studios (Sherman Oaks, CA); Patriot Studios (Denver, CO)
- Genre: Folk-pop
- Length: 3:51 (album version); 3:29 (radio edit)
- Label: Universal Republic
- Songwriters: Colbie Caillat; Ryan Tedder
- Producer: Ryan Tedder

Colbie Caillat singles chronology
"I Do" (2011)	"Brighter Than the Sun" (2011)	"Favorite Song" (2012)

Music video
- "Brighter Than the Sun" on YouTube

"Brighter Than the Sun" is a song by American recording artist Colbie Caillat. It was written by Caillat and Ryan Tedder and produced by the latter. The song was released as the second single from Caillat's third studio album, All of You (2011). The song was released to digital download on May 23, 2011, through Universal Republic. The song received a positive reaction from music critics, who complimented its summer feel. The song is certified platinum in the United States and has been successful on many Billboard charts, including the Hot 100, where the song reached the top 50, the Adult Contemporary chart, where the song peaked at number one for a week. "Brighter Than the Sun" also was a top-40 hit in Austria and was the third-biggest song of 2012 on US adult contemporary radio.

== Composition ==
The song, which Caillat co-wrote with hit-maker and OneRepublic frontman Ryan Tedder, is the second single from her third LP All of You. Caillat talked about her decision to put her new single at the top of the All of You track list:

"I usually like to start my albums by easing my way in. But 'Brighter Than the Sun' has a punch. It's so up-tempo and happy. My manager actually requested that it be No. 1, and he was right. This song is awesome because it just gets people started right away and interested in what's next. A different instrument leads into each part of the song. It never stays the same, which keeps listeners wanting to hear what's next."

Caillat says she wrote all the tracks on All of You about her relationship with Justin Young, who plays guitar in her band:

"He was in my band for two years before we noticed that we like each other. I wrote most of this album about us, our ups and downs."

The lyrics reflect the tumble into love:

"Boy, we go together like peanuts and Paydays/ Marley and Reggae/ And everybody needs to get a chance to say/ Oh, this is how it starts/ Lightning strikes the heart/ It goes off like a gun/ Brighter than the sun."

== Critical reception ==
Amy Sciaretto from Artist Direct was positive, considering it "bright, airy, whisper-light, sweet and beachy!". She also loves "how she makes people feel warm and reminds of the ocean when listen to her tunes". Robbie Daw wrote for Idolator that Colbie Caillat has served up an upbeat, infectious new single, just in time for summer. Kyle Anderson wrote for Entertainment Weekly positively that "Caillat plays with rhythmic touches (the high-spirited handclaps on Brighter Than the Sun)." Lavina Suthenthiran from MTV News said that 'Brighter Than the Sun' is a fresh tune marrying warm vocals and acoustics but is a bit pacier than Bubbly and is bound to get you all in that summer mood." Chris Willman from Chicago Tribune thought that even with a variety of producers, the album style does not change, saying that the song "has the kind of quickly strummed acoustic guitars and handclaps that suggest somebody's been ingesting some "Me and Julio Down by the Schoolyard." Sputnikmusic said that the song "warrants attention, offering up Colbie's only real successful landing on her targeted 'new' sound. The expanded presence of drums, tambourines, and handclaps all create the desired 'tropical' effect that she obviously yearned to either maintain or further enliven with her newest LP."

== Chart performance ==
The song debuted at number ninety on the Billboard Hot 100. As of the week of February 4, 2012, "Brighter Than the Sun" has reached number 47. The single has spent twenty-six weeks inside the Hot 100 chart, thereby becoming her best performing song since "I Never Told You" of 2010 due to its longevity on the chart. The song has proved to be a hit, so far, on the adult contemporary charts. On the Adult Pop Songs, the song has peaked at number two, so far, becoming one of her most successful singles on the adult pop charts, alongside "Fallin' for You" and only behind "Bubbly". On the Adult Contemporary chart, the song has peaked at number one, becoming her third-single to top the chart. On the Pop Songs chart, the song has peaked at number thirty-nine and is the first of the album to chart and her most successful single since "Fallin' for You" (2009). Similar with the Pop Songs chart, the song has been also moderately well on the Radio Songs, peaking at thirty-eight, so far.

== Music video ==
A teaser of the music video was released on June 13, 2011. The video was filmed in the appropriately sunny Playa Del Rey beachside community of Los Angeles. The production is inspired on the nature scenes, such as flowers, fruits and a bed full of green gram. The video premiered on June 30, 2011. In the video, Colbie appears surrounded by her circle of friends. Next, a green fern gets a 10-second close-up, followed by a tight shot of Colbie's hands planting sheets of grass. Colbie proceeds to twirl in front of her orange tree and reveals her swing, until a dance party is produced. Jenna Hally Rubenstein from MTV Buzzworthy said sarcastically that the video is "the hottest, most environmentally conscious party of the summer so far."

== Live performances ==
Caillat performed the song on the Today Show on July 12, 2011, and on The Tonight Show with Jay Leno two days later. Caillat was the featured musical guest on the So Random! episode "Colbie Caillat" on August 14, 2011, where she performed the song. In her So Random! performance, she had to change the lyric "so damn beautiful" to "so so beautiful". Caillat performed the song on Live with Regis & Kelly show on September 27, 2011. Caillat went to Lopez Tonight to perform the track on October 1, 2011.

== Charts ==
=== Weekly charts ===
Chart (2011–2012)	Peak position
Austria (Ö3 Austria Top 40)	31
Canada Hot 100 (Billboard)	65
Canada AC (Billboard)	15
Canada Hot AC (Billboard)	31
Germany (GfK)	44
Japan Hot 100 (Billboard)	77
South Korea (Gaon Music Chart)	67
Switzerland (Schweizer Hitparade)	55
US Billboard Hot 100	47
US Adult Contemporary (Billboard)	1
US Adult Pop Airplay (Billboard)	2
US Pop Airplay (Billboard)	33

=== Year-end charts ===
Chart (2011)	Position
US Adult Top 40 (Billboard)	31

Chart (2012)	Position
US Adult Contemporary (Billboard)	3
US Adult Top 40 (Billboard)	34

== Certifications ==
Region	Certification	Certified units/sales
Brazil (Pro-Música Brasil)	Gold	30,000^{‡}
New Zealand (RMNZ)	Gold	15,000^{‡}
United States (RIAA)	Platinum	1,000,000^{^}
^{^} Shipments figures based on certification alone.^{‡} Sales+streaming figures based on certification alone.

== Release history ==
Release dates and formats for "Brighter Than the Sun"
Region	Date	Format	Label(s)	Ref.
United States	September 20, 2011	Mainstream airplay	Republic	
