= Brent Kutzle discography =

This is the full discography of American musician and record producer Brent Kutzle.

== As performer ==
=== With OneRepublic ===
Kutzle is a member of OneRepublic, an American band.

==== Albums ====
- Dreaming Out Loud (2007)
- Waking Up (2009)
- Native (2013)

==== Singles ====
- "Apologize"
- "Stop and Stare"
- "Say (All I Need)"
- "Mercy"
- "Come Home"
- "All the Right Moves"
- "Secrets"
- "Marchin On"
- "Good Life"
- "Christmas Without You"
- "Feel Again"
- "If I Lose Myself"
- "Counting Stars"
- "Something I Need"
- "Love Runs Out"
- "I Lived"

== Songs written ==
Discography
Year	Artist	Album	Song	Co-written with
2007	OneRepublic	Dreaming Out Loud	" Say (All I Need)	Ryan Tedder, Drew Brown, Zach Filkins, Eddie Fisher
2007	OneRepublic	Dreaming Out Loud	"All Fall Down"	Ryan Tedder, Drew Brown, Zach Filkins, Eddie Fisher
2007	OneRepublic	Dreaming Out Loud	"Won't Stop"	Ryan Tedder, Drew Brown, Zach Filkins, Eddie Fisher
2009	OneRepublic	Waking Up	"Made for You"	Ryan Tedder
2009	OneRepublic	Waking Up	"Everybody Loves Me"	Ryan Tedder
2009	OneRepublic	Waking Up	Good Life"	Ryan Tedder, Noel Zancanella, Eddie Fisher
2009	OneRepublic	Waking Up	"All This Time"	Ryan Tedder
2009	OneRepublic	Waking Up	"Lullaby"	Ryan Tedder
2010	Tamar Kaprelian	Sinner or a Saint	"Sinner or a Saint"	Ryan Tedder, Tamar Kaprelian
2011	Big Time Rush	Elevate	"Music Sounds Better with U"	Big Time Rush, Thomas Bangalter, Benjamin Cohen, Ryan Tedder, Eric Bellinger, Frank Musker, Noel Zancanella, Alain Quême, Dominic Bugatti
2011	Cobra Starship	Night Shades	"#1Nite (One Night)"	Gabe Saporta, Ryan Tedder
2011	Javier Colon	Come Through For You	"1,000 Lights"	Ryan Tedder, Noel Zancanella, Leona Lewis
2012	K'naan	Country, God or the Girl	"Better"	Noel Zancanella, Ryan Tedder, Keinan Abdi Warsame, Chris Martin, Will Champion, Jonny Buckland, Guy Berryman
2012	Leona Lewis	Glassheart	"Glassheart"	Leona Lewis, Ryan Tedder, Noel Zancanella, Justin Franks, Fis Shkreli, Peter Svensson
2012	B.o.B	Strange Clouds	"So Good"	Bobby Simmons, Ryan Tedder
2013	OneRepublic	Native	"If I Lose Myself"	Benjamin Levine, Ryan Tedder, Zach Filkins
2013	OneRepublic	Native	"Feel Again"	Ryan Tedder, Drew Brown, Noel Zancanella
2013	OneRepublic	Native	"What You Wanted"	Ryan Tedder
2013	OneRepublic	Native	"Light It Up"	Ryan Tedder
2013	OneRepublic	Native	"Au Revoir"	Ryan Tedder
2013	OneRepublic	Native	"Burning Bridges"	Ryan Tedder
2013	OneRepublic	Native	"Preacher"	Ryan Tedder
2013	OneRepublic	Native	"Don't Look Down"	Ryan Tedder
2013	Ellie Goulding	Halcyon	"Burn"	Ellie Goulding, Greg Kurstin, Noel Zancanella, Ryan Tedder
2013	Christina Aguilera	The Hunger Games: Catching Fire	"We Remain"	Ryan Tedder, Mikky Ekko
2014	OneRepublic	Native (re-release)	"Love Runs Out"	Ryan Tedder, Drew Brown, Zach Filkins, Eddie Fisher
2018	Switchfoot	Native Tongue	"Native Tongue"	Jon Foreman, Tim Foreman

== Songs produced ==
Discography
Year	Artist	Album	Song	Co-produced with
2007	OneRepublic	Dreaming Out Loud	"Say (All I Need)"	Ryan Tedder, Drew Brown, Zach Filkins, Eddie Fisher
2007	OneRepublic	Dreaming Out Loud	"All Fall Down"	Drew Brown, Zach Filkins, Eddie Fisher, Ryan Tedder
2007	OneRepublic	Dreaming Out Loud	"Won't Stop"	Drew Brown, Zach Filkins, Eddie Fisher, Ryan Tedder
2009	OneRepublic	Waking Up	"Made for You"	Ryan Tedder
2009	OneRepublic	Waking Up	"All the Right Moves"	Ryan Tedder, Andrew Picket
2009	OneRepublic	Waking Up	"Everybody Loves Me"	Ryan Tedder, Andrew Pickett
2009	OneRepublic	Waking Up	"Good Life"	Ryan Tedder, Noel Zancanella
2009	OneRepublic	Waking Up	"All This Time"	Ryan Tedder
2009	OneRepublic	Waking Up	"Lullaby"	Ryan Tedder, Andrew Pickett
2009	Leona Lewis	Echo	"Lost Then Found"	Ryan Tedder, Noel Zancanella, Dan Mukala
2010	Tamar Kaprelian	Sinner or a Saint	"Sinner or a Saint"	Ryan Tedder
2011	Cobra Starship	Night Shades	"#1Nite (One Night)"	Ryan Tedder
2011	Beyoncé	4	"I Was Here"	Ryan Tedder, Beyoncé Knowles, Kuk Harrell
2012	Leona Lewis	Glassheart	"Glassheart"	Ryan Tedder, Noel Zancanella, DJ Frank E, Fis Shkreli
2013	OneRepublic	Native	"If I Lose Myself"	Benjamin Levine, Ryan Tedder
2013	OneRepublic	Native	"Feel Again"	Ryan Tedder, Noel Zancanella, Drew Brown
2013	OneRepublic	Native	"What You Wanted"	Ryan Tedder
2013	OneRepublic	Native	"Light It Up"	Ryan Tedder
2013	OneRepublic	Native	"Burning Bridges"	Ryan Tedder, Noel Zancanella, Zdar and Boombass
2013	OneRepublic	Native	"Preacher"	Ryan Tedder
2014	Monarch	Apollo EP	"Stay"	Brennan Strawn, Brian Willet, Joel Plotnik
2014	Monarch	Apollo EP	"Snow White"	Brennan Strawn, Brian Willet, Joel Plotnik
