= List of awards and nominations received by OneRepublic =

OneRepublic awards and nominations
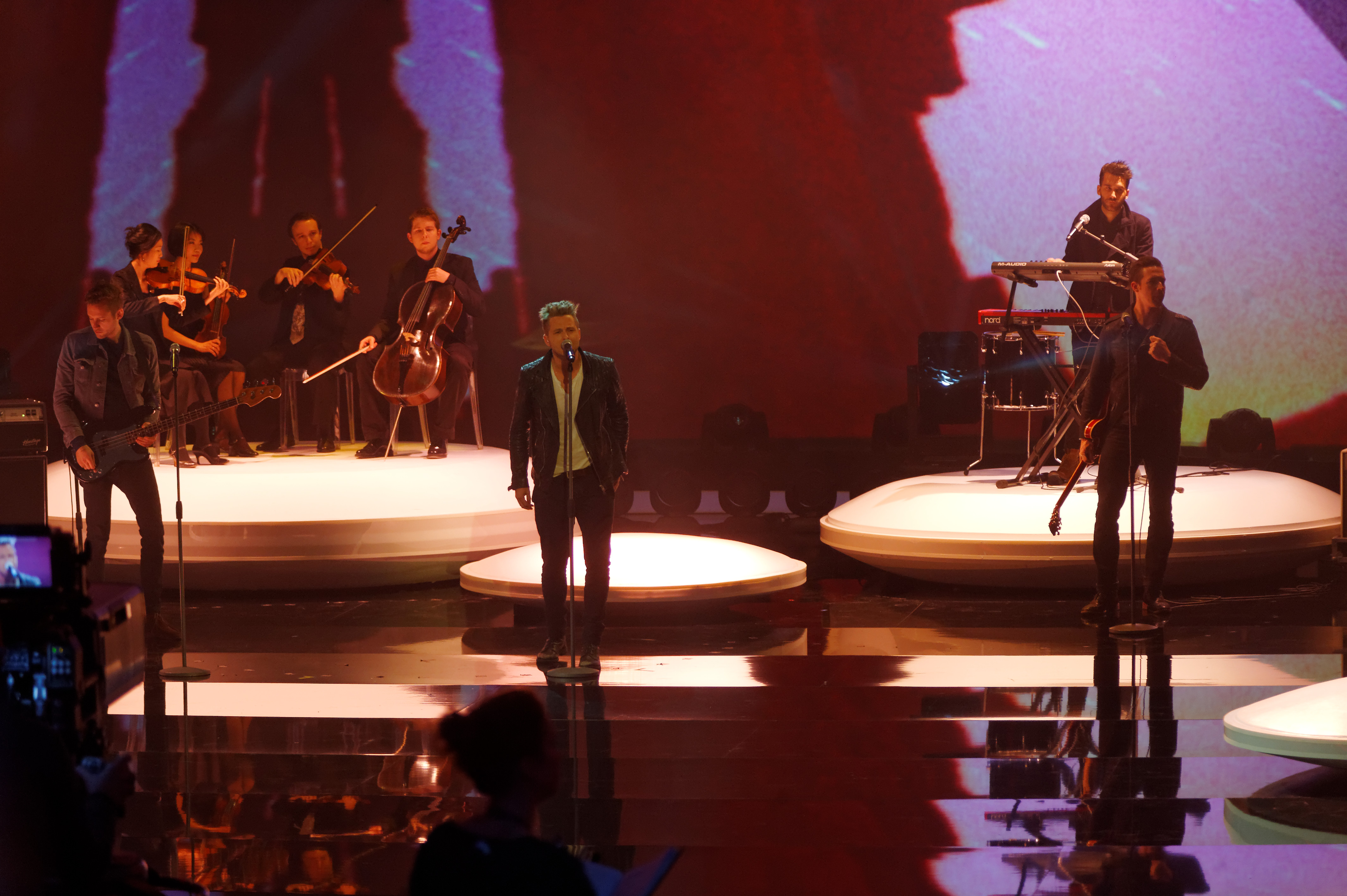
- OneRepublic performing live in 2013
Awards and nominations
Award	Wins	Nominations
American Music Awards	0	4
Billboard	0	3
CMT	0	1
Echo	0	2
Grammy	0	2
MTV Asia	1	1
MTV Europe	0	1
Much	0	2
Nickelodeon Kids' Choice	0	2
People's Choice	0	3
Teen Choice	0	10
World Music	0	1
ESKA MUSIC AWARDS (Poland)	1	0
LOS40 Music Awards	1	3
iHeartRadio Music Awards	0	1

Totals (Note: Certain award groups do not simply award one winner. They acknowledge several different recipients, have runners-up, and have third place. Since this is a specific recognition and is different from losing an award, runner-up mentions are considered wins in this award tally. For simplification and to avoid errors, each award in this list has been presumed to have had a prior nomination.)
- Wins: 5
- Nominations: 35

OneRepublic is an American pop rock band from Colorado Springs, Colorado. Formed in 2002 by Ryan Tedder and Zach Filkins, the band achieved commercial success on Myspace as an unsigned act. In late 2003, after OneRepublic played shows throughout the Los Angeles area, a number of record labels approached the band with interest, but OneRepublic ultimately signed with Velvet Hammer, an imprint of Columbia Records. They made their first album with producer Greg Wells during the summer and fall of 2005 at his studio, Rocket Carousel, in Culver City, California. The album was originally scheduled for release on June 6, 2006, but the group was dropped by Columbia two months before the album ever came out. The lead single of that album, "Apologize", was released in 2005. It received some recognition on Myspace in 2006.

In 2007, OneRepublic released their debut album, Dreaming Out Loud. Its lead single "Apologize" was notably remixed by Timbaland, becoming a huge international success, reaching number one in sixteen countries, subsequently earning them a Grammy Award nomination. The second single, "Stop and Stare" mirrored its predecessor's success. The album was later certified Platinum by the Recording Industry Association of America (RIAA). The band's second album, Waking Up (2009), produced the successful singles, "All the Right Moves", "Secrets", "Marchin On", and "Good Life", the latter reaching the top ten of the US Billboard Hot 100.

OneRepublic's third album, Native (2013), became the band's first top ten album on the Billboard 200, and highest-charting album to date, charting at number four. The lead single, "If I Lose Myself" charted within the top ten in several countries, while the album's third single, "Counting Stars", became the band's most successful single in recent years, obtaining top five placements in Australia, Canada, Germany, Ireland, New Zealand, the U.S. and the UK. This marks their highest-charting single in the United Kingdom to date. It has also peaked at number 2 on the US Billboard Hot 100, matching their highest peak of "Apologize" in 2007.

== American Music Awards ==
The American Music Awards is an annually held awards ceremony for outstanding achievements for American artists in the record industry, which airs on ABC. OneRepublic has received no awards from four nominations.

Year	Nominee / work	Award	Result
2011	OneRepublic	Favorite Pop/Rock Band/Duo/Group	Nominated
2014	OneRepublic	Favorite Pop/Rock Band/Duo/Group	Nominated
2014	OneRepublic	Favorite Adult Contemporary Artist	Nominated
2022	OneRepublic	Favorite Pop Duo or Group	Nominated

== Billboard Music Awards ==
The Billboard Music Awards is an annual awards show from Billboard. OneRepublic has received no awards from three nominations.

Year	Nominee / work	Award	Result
2014	OneRepublic	Top Duo/Group	Nominated
2014	OneRepublic	Billboard Milestone Award	Nominated
2014	"Counting Stars"	Top Digital Song	Nominated

== CMT Music Awards ==
The CMT Music Awards is a fan-voted awards show for country music videos and television performances. OneRepublic have received no award from one nomination.

Year	Nominee / work	Award	Result
2014	"Counting Stars" (shared with Dierks Bentley)	Performance of the Year	Nominated

== Echo Awards ==
The Echo Awards is a German music award event which is held annually, where the year's winners are decided by the band's sales from the previous year. OneRepublic has received no awards from two nominations.

Year	Nominee / work	Award	Result
2008	"Apologize" (shared with Timbaland)	National/International Hit of the Year	Nominated
2009	OneRepublic	Best International Group	Nominated

== Eska Music Awards ==
Eska Music Awards (EMA) is a major Polish awards ceremony for national and international music launched in 2002 by Radio Eska. OneRepublic have received one award from one nomination.

Year	Nominee / work	Award	Result
2010	OneRepublic	International Band of the Year	Won

== Grammy Awards ==
The Grammy Awards is an annual music awards show held by the National Academy of Recording Arts and Sciences of the United States for outstanding achievements in the record industry. OneRepublic has received no awards from one nomination.

Year	Nominee / work	Award	Result
2009	"Apologize"	Best Pop Performance by a Duo or Group with Vocal	Nominated

== iHeart Radio Music Awards ==
iHeartRadio Music Awards is an inaugural music award show presented by Clear Channel Communications's platform iHeartRadio and NBC. OneRepublic has received one award from two nominations.

Year	Nominee / work	Award	Result
2015	"Counting Stars"	Best Lyrics	Nominated
2024	OneRepublic	Best Duo/Group of the Year	Won

== LOS40 Music Awards ==
The LOS40 Music Awards, formerly Los Premios 40 Principales, is an annual Spanish awards show that recognises the people and works of pop musicians. OneRepublic have received one award from four nominations.

Year	Nominee / work	Award	Result
2008	"Apologize"	Best International Song	Won
2014	OneRepublic	Best International Act	Nominated
2014	"Counting Stars"	Best International Song	Nominated
2016	"Wherever I Go"	International Video of the Year	Nominated

== Lunas del Auditorio ==
Year	Award	Nomination	Result	Ref
2015	Best Foreign Pop	OneRepublic	Nominated	

== MTV Awards ==
=== MTV Asia Awards ===
The biannual MTV Asia Awards is the Asian equivalent of the Australian MTV Australia Awards. The awards are for the recognition to Asian and international icons in music, among other areas. OneRepublic has received one award from two nominations.

Year	Nominee / work	Award	Result
2008	"Apologize" (shared with Timbaland)	Best Hook Up	Won
2008	OneRepublic	Breakthrough Artist	Nominated

=== MTV Europe Music Awards ===
The MTV Europe Music Awards is an annual awards ceremony established in 1994 by MTV Europe for the best in European music. OneRepublic has received no awards from two nomination.

Year	Nominee / work	Award	Result
2008	OneRepublic	Best New Act	Nominated
2016	OneRepublic	Best World Stage Performance	Nominated

=== MTV Movie & TV Awards ===
The MTV Movie & TV Awards is a film and television awards show presented annually on MTV. The first MTV Movie Awards were presented in 1992. OneRepublic has received no award from one nomination.

Year	Nominee / work	Award	Result
2023	I Ain't Worried	Best Song	Nominated

== MuchMusic Video Awards ==
The MuchMusic Video Awards is an annual awards ceremony presented by the Canadian music video channel MuchMusic for music videos. OneRepublic have received no awards from two nominations.

Year	Nominee / work	Award	Result
2008	"Apologize" (shared with Timbaland)	Best International Video – Group	Nominated
2008	"Stop and Stare"	Best International Video – Group	Nominated

== Nickelodeon Kids Choice Awards ==
The Nickelodeon Kids Choice Awards is an annual award show that were kids vote for their Favorite Movies, TV, Music, and Sports. OneRepublic have received no awards from two nominations.

Year	Nominee / work	Award	Result
2014	OneRepublic	Favorite Music Group	Nominated
2015	OneRepublic	Favorite Music Group	Nominated
2016	OneRepublic	Favorite Music Group	Nominated

== NRJ Music Awards ==
The NRJ Music Awards is an annual awards show celebrating the best domestic and international music in France as voted by fans of NRJ Radio. OneRepublic has received one nomination.

Year	Nominee / work	Award	Result
2017	OneRepublic (with Amir)	Francophone Duo/Group of the Year	Nominated

== People's Choice Awards ==
The People's Choice Awards is an annual CBS awards show that recognises the people and works of popular culture. OneRepublic has received no awards from three nominations.

Year	Nominee / work	Award	Result
2009	"Apologize"	Favorite Rock Song	Nominated
2014	OneRepublic	Favorite Band	Nominated
2015	OneRepublic	Favorite Group	Nominated

== Teen Choice Awards ==
The Teen Choice Awards are an annual awards ceremony from Fox Broadcasting Company. OneRepublic failed to win all eight times when they’re nominated.

Year	Nominee / work	Award	Result
2008	OneRepublic	Choice Breakout Group	Nominated
2008	"Stop and Stare"	Choice Rock Track	Nominated
2010	"All the Right Moves"	Choice Rock Track	Nominated
2011	OneRepublic	Choice Rock Group	Nominated
2011	"Good Life"	Choice Rock Track	Nominated
2014	OneRepublic	Choice Rock Group	Nominated
2014	"Love Runs Out"	Choice Rock Song	Nominated
2015	OneRepublic	Choice Music Group: Male	Nominated
2016	"Wherever I Go"	Choice Rock Song	Nominated
2016	OneRepublic	Choice Summer Music Star Group	Nominated

== Webby Awards ==
A Webby Award is an award for excellence on the Internet presented annually by The International Academy of Digital Arts and Sciences.

Year	Nominee / work	Award	Result
2017	"Kids"	Best Music Video	Won

== World Music Awards ==
The World Music Awards is an international awards ceremony that annually honors recording artists based on worldwide sales figures provided by the International Federation of the Phonographic Industry. OneRepublic has received no awards from one nomination.

Year	Nominee / work	Award	Result
2012	OneRepublic	Best Group	Nominated

== Žebřík Music Awards ==
Year	Nominee / work	Award	Result	Ref.
2009	"All the Right Moves"	Best International Song	Nominated	
