= Native (album) =

Studio album by OneRepublic
- Released: March 22, 2013
- Recorded: 2012–2013
- Studios: Black Rock Studios, Santorini; RAK Recording Studio, London; Patriot Studios, Denver; Faust Records, Prague; Studio Le Roy, Amsterdam; Motorbass Studio, Paris; Metropolis Studios, London; Tritonus Studio, Berlin; The Warehouse Studio, Vancouver; Lotzah Matzah Studios, New York City; Downtown Studios, New York City; Orlon Studio, Orange County; Germano Studios, New York City; Northern Records, Yorba Linda; Sonikwire Studios, Irvine; Mixstar Studios, Virginia Beach; Plety Street Studio, New Orleans; Enormous Studios, Los Angeles; Audiophile Studios, New Orleans; January Sound Studio, Dallas
- Genres: Pop; pop rock
- Length: 50:13
- Labels: Mosley; Interscope
- Producers: Jeff Bhasker; Benny Blanco; Drew Brown; Emile Haynie; Tyler Sam Johnson; Brent Kutzle; Ryan Tedder; Noel Zancanella; Zdar and Boombass

OneRepublic chronology
Waking Up (2009)	Native (2013)	Oh My My (2016)

Singles from Native
- 1. "Feel Again" Released: August 3, 2012; 2. "If I Lose Myself" Released: January 8, 2013; 3. "Counting Stars" Released: June 14, 2013; 4. "Something I Need" Released: August 25, 2013; 5. "Love Runs Out" Released: April 14, 2014; 6. "I Lived" Released: September 23, 2014

Native is the third studio album by American pop rock band OneRepublic. It was released on March 22, 2013 through Mosley Music Group and Interscope Records in Germany and Ireland, March 25 worldwide except North America, and March 26 in North America. The album was originally planned to be released at the end of 2012 with the lead single being "Feel Again", which was released on August 27, 2012. However, due to the album not being completed at the time, it was pushed back to early 2013.

The most successful single was the third single "Counting Stars", which peaked at number two on the Billboard Hot 100, becoming their highest-charting hit since "Apologize" also peaked there in 2007. It has also become their biggest hit in the United Kingdom—it topped the charts there for two non-consecutive weeks—and has charted within the top ten in nine countries, including top five placements in Australia, Germany, Ireland and New Zealand. The album's fourth single, "Something I Need", has since been certified 3× Platinum in Australia and Gold in New Zealand, peaking in the top 5 in both countries. Fifth single "Love Runs Out" charted in the top 5 in thirteen countries, including the United Kingdom, whilst the sixth and final single "I Lived" was a minor success.

The album received positive reviews from critics. It charted in the top 20 in eleven countries worldwide. It has been certified Platinum in the United States, Australia and the United Kingdom.

== Background ==
On February 4, 2012, OneRepublic announced via Twitter that their third studio album was scheduled to be released in Autumn 2012, and that the band was hoping to release the lead single from the album around April or May. The band stated that they were "not rushing it", saying that the album "has to literally be the best thing we've ever done".

== Album design ==
The artwork for the album was brought up on the idea of how different each member of the group is from each other and that each one is like a different animal. Lead singer Ryan Tedder is represented by a fox, drummer Eddie Fisher is a mountain lion, guitarist Drew Brown is an owl, bassist Brent Kutzle is a gazelle, and guitarist Zach Filkins is a bison. Kutzle also came up with the idea of calling the album Native. According to Kutzle, it means indigenous to every country and how different they are as individuals.

== Tour ==
In support of the album, OneRepublic launched the Native Tour on April 2, 2013. Beginning in Europe, the band performed a total of 21 shows throughout April and May. In June 2013, they announced a second leg, to be played alongside Sara Bareilles which was to take place through 52 shows across North America until October. From here they would travel to Asia for a total of six shows across Lebanon, China, Malaysia, Singapore, Indonesia and ending in the Philippines on November 6. Their final leg for 2013 was across Australia and New Zealand, marking their largest tour across Australia and their first visit to New Zealand. A total of four shows were played across Australia, beginning in Perth and ending in Melbourne; from here they went on to play two shows in New Zealand, one in Auckland and one in Wellington, ending November 17.

On January 29, 2014, the band began their second European leg, and their fifth leg of the tour. They played a total of 22 shows in February and early March, ending with two shows in Paris on March 7. The band then traveled to the United Kingdom where they played seven shows, beginning in London on March 16 and ending back in London on March 27 after a trip through the UK and Ireland. On May 10, 2014 the band embarked on their second US tour, their Native Summer Tour, and their sixth overall leg, riding on the success of the song "Counting Stars." They played a total of 48 shows, ending in Aspen, Colorado on August 30. On April 8, 2014, the band announced a seventh leg of the tour, and the second European tour, beginning on October 19 at the 3Arena in Dublin. This leg would mark the band's first arena tour, and would include their first show at The O2 Arena in London. They played a total of 23 shows across Europe, ending at the Meo Arena in Lisbon, Portugal on November 21, 2014. This marks OneRepublic's largest tour to date, playing a total of 185 shows throughout 2013-14.

In April 2015 they began the last leg of the tour. They performed in Canada, in Europe and, for the first time, in South America, including a show at Rock in Rio.

== Singles ==
- "If I Lose Myself" was released as the lead single from the album on January 8, 2013. The song was used in Season 4 Premiere of Pretty Little Liars. The remix by Alesso was featured in the season premiere of the 2013 revival season of One Life to Live.
- "Counting Stars" was announced as the second single from the album and was released on June 14, 2013. It was released as the lead single in the UK and several other countries. The song has become their most successful thus far from the album charting within the top five in Australia, Austria, Germany, Ireland, Luxembourg, Poland and New Zealand, and being certified 5× Platinum in Australia and 2× Platinum in New Zealand. In the UK "Counting Stars" became OneRepublic's first ever number one single. In the U.S. "Counting Stars", has peaked at number 2 on the Billboard Hot 100, becoming their highest-charting hit since "Apologize" also peaked there in 2007. The music video for the single was filmed in Louisiana and was released on May 31.
- "Something I Need" was announced as the album's third single for Oceania and parts of Europe on August 25, 2013. The music video was directed by Cameron Buddy and was released on October 7, 2013. It has been certified 3× Platinum in Australia and Platinum in New Zealand, despite little promotion due to the late success of "Counting Stars".
- "Love Runs Out" was announced as the fourth single from their album on April 9, 2014. The song was meant to be released as the lead single from the album, but Ryan stated, "The verse was an A, and everything else was an A, but the chorus was a B. So we tabled it." The song was released on April 14, along with a re-release of the album in the US. The song was released to US radio on May 6, 2014.
- "I Lived" was announced as the fifth single from the album on August 13, 2014. It was originally planned to be released as the fourth single but was scrapped in favor of "Love Runs Out". On September 23, 2014, Arty's remix was released as a single on iTunes Store.

=== Promotional singles ===
- "Feel Again" was originally released as the lead single from the then-untitled Native on August 27, 2012, however it was later rebranded as a promotional single. A portion of the proceeds from the sales of the single was donated to Save the Children's Every Beat Matters campaign to support training frontline health workers around the world. The single reached number 36 on the Billboard Hot 100 and number 59 on the Canadian Hot 100.
- "What You Wanted" was released as a promotional single from the album on February 19, 2013, available to download on iTunes in the month leading up to the album's release on available listings of the album. The song was also featured on the trailer for the movie adaptation of John Green's novel, The Fault In Our Stars (2014).

=== Other songs ===
- "I Lived" was featured in an NBC commercial for The Office and Parks and Recreation. It was also used in the series finale of 90210, as well as on various ESPN programs such as SportsCenter and First Take and in the first episode of The Michael J. Fox Show. It was also played at the end of the second episode of Red Band Society. NBC and NBCSN used the song during the introduction of the 2015 Stanley Cup Finals games between the Tampa Bay Lightning and the Chicago Blackhawks. The song was also covered by the Glee cast as the last song in the series finale of Glee.
- "Life in Color" was used in the commercials leading up to the new season of America's Got Talent season eight. It was also used as the opening song for the Australian television show House Rules in 2013. A remix of the song was included on the official soundtrack to the American epic biblical drama film Son of God (2014). The song was also used in the promoting campaign for the Big Pony collection by Ralph Lauren, in addition to the 'Best Summer Ever' advertisement by Malibu.
- "Au Revoir" was used in the fifth episode of the fifth season of The CW television series The Vampire Diaries.

== Critical reception ==
Professional ratings
Aggregate scores
Source	Rating
Metacritic	65/100
Review scores
Source	Rating
AllMusic	4/5 stars
Cross Rhythms	10/10
Entertainment Weekly	A−
Knoxville News Sentinel	3.5/5 stars
Melodic.net	3.5/5 stars
musicOMH	3/5 stars
Q	2/5 stars
Rolling Stone	2.5/5 stars
Tom Hull – on the Web	B
USA Today	3/4 stars

Native received generally positive reviews from music critics. At Metacritic, which assigns a normalized rating out of 100 to reviews from mainstream critics, the album received an average score of 65, based on 7 reviews, which indicates "generally favorable reviews". Matt Collar of AllMusic asked the question "How do they stand out in a sea of other artists who sound so similar to them, primarily because as a songwriter, Tedder has largely defined much of the entire modern pop sound?" To this, Collar found that "In many ways, OneRepublic are a clearing house for mainstream pop sensibilities, and Native is no exception", which this leads him to espouse "Ultimately, all of this might seem like more of a knock against OneRepublic as pop opportunists, if the music weren't so dang catchy." At Entertainment Weekly, Adam Markovitz signaled that this album "is chemically pure pop-rock: flavorless, transparent — and potent enough to melt your resistance like battery acid", and said that the album contains "soaring, evangelical choruses of prescription-strength goose-bump inducers like "Feel Again" and "If I Lose Myself."" Johan Wippsson of Melodic.net wrote that the band has taken its sound to the next level with "Coldplay's atmospheric and epic melodies."

Jody Rosen of Rolling Stone alluded to how "Native is "catchy and predictable: big melodies, inspirational lyrics, production that sits between pop and rock and dance", but was critical of Tedder, who he called "a song savant who's a boring and characterless singer." musicOMH's Elliah Heifetz surmised that "Often enough though, Native does truly shine", which he noted the fact "there's no question the man can write", but that "it's just a real shame that Tedder seems to have forgotten how to write for his band. And this, ultimately, is what keeps Native from both from being a great OneRepublic album, and from its true potential as a great album by Ryan Tedder." Hellhound Music's Matt Crane found the release to be "filled with musical exploration, dense lyrical themes, emotional depth, and diverse instrumental execution." Elysa Gardner of USA Today evoked how "Ryan Tedder neither surprises nor disappoints, offering sturdy, atmospheric pop" on the album. Idolator's Emily Tan said that "Native has OneRepublic demonstrating how they’ve grown as a band while also somewhat managing to stick to their musical foundations." At the Knoxville News Sentinel, Chuck Campbell noted that with Tedder he "happily sticks to his guns, relentlessly firing off the ammo until he wins the battle with irresistible refrains and a mostly optimistic attitude", which contains some "unapologetic hokum in Native, from the sweeping choruses to the upbeat themes to the quaint keyboards," and the album is not "artlessly endearing." In addition, Campbell highlighted the fact that with respect to the album "the sonic manipulation is transparent: The more blatant OneRepublic is with the hooks the better, plus the more extroverted sounds are far more effective than the subtler arrangements", which if it is "dance music, at least it's smart-ish dance music." Tony Cummings of Cross Rhythms claimed that "with such passionate vocals and Tedder's multi-layered production virtuosity the overall effect is pop rock of the highest standard."

Haley Black of Highlight Magazine said that "Native is no exception and the band keeps producing catchy tunes that appeal to a wide range of listeners", however Black cautioned that "Tedder's vocals are somewhat suffocated and the instruments that are supposed to be dominant are diluted by synthesizers. If many of the songs were slightly more stripped down, this record would have exceeded all expectations." John Pareles of The New York Times gave a positive review of the album, when he praised that "The craftsmanship is painstaking and impressive: layer upon layer of glossy keyboards, reverberant guitars and choirlike backing vocals. But these crystal-palace productions are proud showcases for unctuous, sometimes oddly morbid lyrics." Victoria Segal of Q felt otherwise writing that "Ryan Tedder should have so strikingly failed to include one memorable tune on his own band's album," which is because she noted he has done them for the likes of Adele and Beyoncé. Also, Segal noted how the band would "go through all the emotions in a blaze of overproduced glory, but it's like being hit by a wrecking ball of polysterene[sic], a big swing with very little impact."

== Commercial performance ==
The album debuted at number four on the Billboard 200, making it OneRepublic's first top 10 album. In its first week, Native sold 60,000 units, which is the band's best sales frame since 2007, when their debut album, Dreaming Out Loud, sold 75,000 in its first week. Native was certified Gold by the RIAA on January 22, 2014, and Platinum a year later on January 23, 2015, and quadruple Platinum in 2026 reaching a million copies in sales in March 2015. In the United States, it has sold 1.1 million copies as of September 2016.

In the United Kingdom, the album debuted at number 35 and fell out of the top 75 the following week, but re-entered the chart at number 35 in September 2013 after the success of "Counting Stars". The album has since peaked at number nine. In July 2016, Native was certified gold for sales of 300,000 units in the UK. Worldwide, the album has been sold 5 million copies since 2017.

== Track listing ==
No.	Title	Writer(s)	Producer(s)	Length
1.	"Counting Stars"	Ryan Tedder	Tedder; Noel Zancanella	4:17
2.	"If I Lose Myself"	Tedder; Benny Blanco; Brent Kutzle; Zach Filkins	Blanco; Tedder; Kutzle^{[a]}	4:01
3.	"Feel Again"	Tedder; Kutzle; Drew Brown; Zancanella	Tedder; Kutzle; Zancanella; Brown^{[b]}	3:05
4.	"What You Wanted"	Tedder; Kutzle	Tedder; Kutzle	4:01
5.	"I Lived"	Tedder; Zancanella	Tedder; Zancanella	3:55
6.	"Light It Up"	Tedder; Kutzle	Tedder; Kutzle	4:10
7.	"Can't Stop"	Tedder; Jeff Bhasker; Tyler Sam Johnson	Bhasker; Johnson; Tedder; Emile Haynie^{[b]}	4:09
8.	"Au Revoir"	Tedder; Kutzle	Kutzle	4:50
9.	"Burning Bridges"	Tedder; Kutzle	Zdar and Boombass; Tedder; Kutzle; Zancanella	4:17
10.	"Something I Need"	Tedder; Blanco	Blanco; Tedder	4:00
11.	"Preacher"	Tedder; Kutzle	Tedder; Kutzle	4:08
12.	"Don't Look Down"	Tedder; Kutzle	Kutzle	1:37
Total length:				46:37

UK Amazon MP3 bonus track
No.	Title	Writer(s)	Producer(s)	Length
13.	"Feel Again" (Fred Falke Club Remix)	Tedder; Kutzle; Brown; Zancanella	Tedder; Kutzle; Zancanella; Brown^{[b]}; Falke^{[c]}	6:25
Total length:				52:48

UK reissue bonus track
No.	Title	Writer(s)	Producer(s)	Length
13.	"If I Lose Myself" (Alesso vs OneRepublic)	Tedder; Blanco; Kutzle; Filkins	Blanco; Tedder; Kutzle^{[a]}; Alesso^{[c]}	3:34
Total length:				49:57

Target and international deluxe edition bonus tracks
No.	Title	Writer(s)	Producer(s)	Length
13.	"Something's Gotta Give"	Tedder; Zdar; Boombass	Cassius	4:51
14.	"Life in Color"	Tedder; Kutzle	Aaron Sprinkle; Kutzle^{[a]}; Tedder^{[a]}	3:22
15.	"If I Lose Myself" (acoustic)	Tedder; Blanco; Kutzle; Filkins	Kutzle	3:50
16.	"What You Wanted" (acoustic)	Tedder; Kutzle	Kutzle	3:23
17.	"Burning Bridges" (acoustic)	Tedder; Kutzle	Kutzle	4:35
Total length:				66:30

UK deluxe edition reissue bonus tracks
No.	Title	Writer(s)	Producer(s)	Length
18.	"If I Lose Myself" (Alesso vs OneRepublic)	Tedder; Blanco; Kutzle; Filkins	Blanco; Tedder; Kutzle^{[a]}; Alesso^{[c]}	3:34
Total length:				70:01

Japanese bonus track
No.	Title	Writer(s)	Producer(s)	Length
18.	"Good Life"	Tedder; Kutzle; Zancanella; Eddie Fisher	Tedder; Kutzle^{[a]}; Zancanella^{[a]}	4:13
Total length:				70:43

=== 2014 reissue ===
No.	Title	Writer(s)	Producer(s)	Length
1.	"Counting Stars"	Tedder	Tedder; Zancanella	4:17
2.	"Love Runs Out"	Tedder; Kutzle; Brown; Filkins; Fisher	Tedder	3:44
3.	"If I Lose Myself"	Tedder; Blanco; Kutzle; Filkins	Blanco; Tedder; Kutzle^{[a]}	4:01
4.	"Feel Again"	Tedder; Kutzle; Brown; Zancanella	Tedder; Kutzle; Zancanella; Brown^{[b]}	3:05
5.	"What You Wanted"	Tedder; Kutzle	Tedder; Kutzle	4:01
6.	"I Lived"	Tedder; Zancanella	Tedder; Zancanella	3:55
7.	"Light It Up"	Tedder; Kutzle	Tedder; Kutzle	4:10
8.	"Can't Stop"	Tedder; Bhasker; Johnson	Bhasker; Johnson; Tedder; Haynie^{[b]}	4:09
9.	"Au Revoir"	Tedder; Kutzle	Kutzle	4:50
10.	"Burning Bridges"	Tedder; Kutzle	Zdar and Boombass; Tedder; Kutzle; Zancanella	4:17
11.	"Something I Need"	Tedder; Blanco	Blanco; Tedder	4:01
12.	"Preacher"	Tedder; Kutzle	Tedder; Kutzle	4:08
13.	"Don't Look Down"	Tedder; Kutzle	Kutzle	1:39
14.	"Something's Gotta Give"	Tedder; Zdar; Boombass	Cassius	4:51
15.	"Life in Color"	Tedder; Kutzle	Sprinkle; Kutzle^{[a]}; Tedder^{[a]}	3:22
16.	"If I Lose Myself" (Alesso vs OneRepublic)	Tedder; Blanco; Kutzle; Filkins	Blanco; Tedder; Kutzle^{[a]}; Alesso^{[c]}	3:34
Total length:				62:04

Target and international edition bonus tracks
No.	Title	Writer(s)	Producer(s)	Length
16.	"If I Lose Myself" (acoustic)	Tedder; Blanco; Kutzle; Filkins	Kutzle	3:50
17.	"What You Wanted" (acoustic)	Tedder; Kutzle	Kutzle	3:23
18.	"Burning Bridges" (acoustic)	Tedder; Kutzle	Kutzle	4:35
19.	"If I Lose Myself" (Alesso vs OneRepublic)	Tedder; Blanco; Kutzle; Filkins	Blanco; Tedder; Kutzle^{[a]}; Alesso^{[c]}	3:34
Total length:				73:52

E.Leclerc limited edition (bonus CD)
No.	Title	Writer(s)	Producer(s)	Length
1.	"Counting Stars" (Mico C Remix)	Tedder	Tedder; Zancanella; Mico C^{[c]}	3:18
2.	"Love Runs Out" (Passion Pit Remix)	Tedder; Kutzle; Brown; Filkins; Fisher	Tedder; Passion Pit^{[c]}	5:00
3.	"If I Lose Myself" (Alesso vs OneRepublic Extended Remix)	Tedder; Blanco; Kutzle; Filkins	Blanco; Tedder; Kutzle^{[a]}; Alesso^{[c]}	6:55
4.	"Feel Again" (Tai Remix)	Tedder; Kutzle; Brown; Zancanella	Tedder; Kutzle; Zancanella; Brown^{[b]}; Tai^{[c]}	5:31

Notes

- ^{^[a]} signifies a co-producer
- ^{^[b]} signifies an additional producer
- ^{^[b]} signifies a remixer

== Personnel ==
All credits for "Native" are adapted from the album's liner notes and the band's official YouTube channels, except where noted.

=== OneRepublic ===
- Ryan Tedder – lead vocals, guitars, instrumentation, programming (all); acoustic guitar (including 1, 6 and 9); accordion (1); keyboards (including 7); piano, additional programming ("Love Runs Out"); mandolin, heel clicks, knee pats (9); production (1–7, 9–11); percussion (including 2); co-production ("Life In Color"); engineering (2, 10, "Love Runs Out", "If I Lose Myself (OneRepublic vs Alesso)")
- Zach Filkins – guitars (except "Love Runs Out"); background vocals (tracks 1–3, 10, "Love Runs Out", "If I Lose Myself (OneRepublic vs Alesso)"); accordion (1); acoustic guitar (including 1 and "Life In Color"); AutoHarp ("Love Runs Out"); additional bass (3); viola (unspecified tracks)
- Drew Brown – guitars (all); instrumentation, programming; (2, "If I Lose Myself (OneRepublic vs Alesso)"); background vocals (2, 3, 10, "If I Lose Myself (OneRepublic vs Alesso)"); glockenspiel (including 3 and "Life In Color"); additional production (3)
- Eddie Fisher – drums (all); background vocals (2, 3, 10, "If I Lose Myself (OneRepublic vs Alesso)")
- Brent Kutzle – bass, instrumentation (all); background vocals (1–3, 10, "Love Runs Out", "If I Lose Myself (OneRepublic vs Alesso)"); cello (including 3 and 9); piano (including 3, 7, 11 and "Life In Color"); acoustic guitar (including 3); analog synthesizer (including 4); violin, viola (including 9); keyboards, guitar (unspecified tracks); production (3, 4, 6, 8–12); co-production (2, "Life In Color")

=== Additional musicians ===
- HarpEri – harp, accordion (1)
- Bobbie Gordon – background vocals (1, "Love Runs Out")
- David McGlohon – background vocals (1–3, 5, "If I Lose Myself (OneRepublic vs Alesso)")
- Benny Blanco – instrumentation, programming (2, 10, "If I Lose Myself (OneRepublic vs Alesso)"); background vocals (10); production (2, 10, "If I Lose Myself (OneRepublic vs Alesso)")
- Brian Willett – additional keyboards (6, 8, 11, 12)
- Jeff Bhasker – piano, keyboards (7); production (7)
- Tyler Sam Johnson – keyboards, programming (7); production (7)
- Billy Kraven – background vocals (7)
- Trever Hoehne – background vocals (8)
- Anthony King – French horn (8)
- Aaron Anderson – pedal steel guitar (8)
- Scott "Yarmov" Yarmovsky – background vocals (10)
- Chris Scaflani – background vocals (10)
- Danielle Edinburgh Wilson – background vocals (10, 11)
- Margaret-Anne Davis – background vocals (10, 11)
- Toni Skidmore – background vocals (10, 11)
- Jermon Wilson – background vocals (10, 11)
- Ryan's friends and family – background vocals (10)
- The Beauregards – background vocals (12)
- Aaron Sprinkly – additional programming, keyboards, and guitars ("Life In Color"); production, mixing ("Life In Color")
- Zdar – heel clicks, knee pats (9); all instruments (Something's Got to Give); production (9, "Something's Gotta Give"); mixing ("Something's Gotta Give) engineering (9)
- Boombass – heel clicks, knee pats (9); all instruments ("Something's Gotta Give"); production (9)
- Alesso – additional remix, programming, drums, keys and drums ("If I Lose Myself (OneRepublic vs Alesso)"); production ("If I Lose Myself (OneRepublic vs Alesso)")

=== Technical personnel ===
- Noel Zancanella – production (1, 3, 5, 6, 9)
- Emile Haynie – additional production (7)
- Joe Zook – mixing (1, 3, 4, 6, 8, 9, 11, 12); engineering (12)
- Șerban Ghenea – mixing (2, 5, 10, "Love Runs Out", "If I Lose Myself (OneRepublic vs Alesso)")
- Manny Marroquin – mixing (7)
- Chris Gheringer – mastering (all)
- Will Quinnell – mastering (except "Love Runs Out")
- John Hanes – engineer for mix (2, 5, 10, "If I Lose Myself (OneRepublic vs Alesso)")
- Ryan Lipman – assistant engineer for mix (1, 3, 4, 6, 8, 9, 11, 12)
- Phil Seaford – assistant engineer for mix (2, 5, 10, "If I Lose Myself (OneRepublic vs Alesso)")
- Chris Galland – assistant mixing engineer (7)
- Delbert Bowers – assistant mixing engineer (7)
- Smith Carlson – engineering (1–5, 9, 11, "Life In Color", "If I Lose Myself (OneRepublic vs Alesso)")
- Jared Rich – engineering (3, 9, "Life In Color")
- Stevie Wilmat – engineering (6, 11, 12)
- Brandon Collins – engineering (8)
- Alex Bush – engineering (8)
- Chris Scaflani – engineering (10); assistant engineering (2)
- Andy Prickett – engineering ("Life In Color")
- Mikel Le Roy – engineering ("Love Runs Out")
- Gerd Krueger – engineering ("Love Runs Out")
- Luke Oldham – engineering ("Love Runs Out")
- Matthew Tryba – assistant engineering (1–3, "If I Lose Myself (OneRepublic vs Alesso)")
- Scott "Yarmov" Yarmovsky – assistant engineering (2, 10, "If I Lose Myself (OneRepublic vs Alesso)")
- Sam Harper – assistant engineering ("Love Runs Out")
- Aaron Ahmad – assistant engineering ("Love Runs Out")
- Andrew "McMuffin" Luftman – production coordination (2, 10, "If I Lose Myself (OneRepublic vs Alesso)")
- Andrew Van Meter – production manager
- Willo Perron – creative direction
- Neil Krug – original photography

== Charts ==
=== Weekly charts ===
Weekly chart performance for Native
Chart (2013–2015)	Peak position
Australian Albums (ARIA)	8
Austrian Albums (Ö3 Austria)	5
Belgian Albums (Ultratop Flanders)	39
Belgian Albums (Ultratop Wallonia)	42
Canadian Albums (Billboard)	12
Dutch Albums (Album Top 100)	24
French Albums (SNEP)	52
German Albums (Offizielle Top 100)	4
Hungarian Albums (MAHASZ)	18
Irish Albums (IRMA)	15
Italian Albums (FIMI)	31
New Zealand Albums (RMNZ)	12
Norwegian Albums (VG-lista)	22
Polish Albums (ZPAV)	26
Scottish Albums (Official Charts)	4
South African Albums (RISA)	20
Spanish Albums (Promusicae)	34
Swedish Albums (Sverigetopplistan)	16
Swiss Albums (Schweizer Hitparade)	4
UK Albums (Official Charts)	9
US Billboard 200	4
US Top Catalog Albums (Billboard)	21

Chart (2025)	Peak position
Portuguese Streaming Albums (AFP)	124

=== Year-end charts ===
Year-end chart performance for Native
Chart (2013)	Position
Australian Albums (ARIA)	38
German Albums (Offizielle Top 100)	85
Swedish Albums (Sverigetopplistan)	79
Swiss Albums (Schweizer Hitparade)	46
UK Albums (OCC)	114
US Billboard 200	88
Chart (2014)	Position
Australian Albums (ARIA)	73
Austrian Albums (Ö3 Austria)	54
Belgian Albums (Ultratop Flanders)	175
Belgian Albums (Ultratop Wallonia)	156
Canadian Albums (Billboard)	40
French Albums (SNEP)	194
Mexican Albums (AMPROFON)	60
New Zealand Albums (RMNZ)	41
Swedish Albums (Sverigetopplistan)	28
Swiss Albums (Schweizer Hitparade)	73
UK Albums (OCC)	46
US Billboard 200	22
US Digital Albums (Billboard)	14
Chart (2015)	Position
Swedish Albums (Sverigetopplistan)	97

=== Decade-end charts ===
Decade-end chart performance for Native
Chart (2010–2019)	Position
US Billboard 200	104

== Certifications and sales ==
Certifications and sales for Native
Region	Certification	Certified units/sales
Australia (ARIA)	Platinum	70,000^{^}
Austria (IFPI Austria)	Platinum	15,000^{*}
Canada (Music Canada)	3× Platinum	240,000^{‡}
Denmark (IFPI Danmark)	2× Platinum	40,000^{‡}
Germany (BVMI)	3× Gold	300,000^{‡}
Italy (FIMI)	Platinum	50,000^{‡}
Mexico (AMPROFON)	Platinum	60,000^{^}
New Zealand (RMNZ)	4× Platinum	60,000^{‡}
Poland (ZPAV)	3× Platinum	60,000^{‡}
Singapore (RIAS)	Platinum	10,000^{*}
Sweden (GLF)	Platinum	40,000^{‡}
Switzerland (IFPI Switzerland)	Platinum	20,000^{^}
United Kingdom (BPI)	Platinum	300,000^{‡}
United States (RIAA)	4× Platinum	4,000,000^{‡}
Summaries
Worldwide	—	5,000,000
^{*} Sales figures based on certification alone.^{^} Shipments figures based on certification alone.^{‡} Sales+streaming figures based on certification alone.

== Release history ==
Release history and formats for Native
Region	Date	Format	Label
Austria	March 22, 2013	CD; digital download	Mosley Music Group; Interscope
Germany	March 22, 2013	CD; digital download	Mosley Music Group; Interscope
Indonesia	March 22, 2013	CD; digital download	Mosley Music Group; Interscope
Ireland	March 22, 2013	CD; digital download	Mosley Music Group; Interscope
Netherlands	March 22, 2013	CD; digital download	Mosley Music Group; Interscope
Norway	March 22, 2013	CD; digital download	Mosley Music Group; Interscope
Slovenia	March 22, 2013	CD; digital download	Mosley Music Group; Interscope
Switzerland	March 22, 2013	CD; digital download	Mosley Music Group; Interscope
Greece	March 25, 2013	CD; digital download	Mosley Music Group; Interscope
Hong Kong	March 25, 2013	CD; digital download	Mosley Music Group; Interscope
Italy	March 25, 2013	CD; digital download	Mosley Music Group; Interscope
Russia	March 25, 2013	CD; digital download	Mosley Music Group; Interscope
Spain	March 25, 2013	CD; digital download	Mosley Music Group; Interscope
United Kingdom	March 25, 2013	Digital download; CD; Deluxe CD	Mosley Music Group; Interscope
Canada	March 26, 2013	CD; digital download; vinyl	Mosley Music Group; Interscope
United States	March 26, 2013	CD; digital download; vinyl	Mosley Music Group; Interscope
Japan	March 27, 2013	CD; digital download	Mosley Music Group; Interscope
Australia	April 26, 2013	CD; digital download	Mosley Music Group; Interscope
United Kingdom	October 14, 2013	CD reissue; deluxe CD reissue	Mosley Music Group; Interscope
United Kingdom	December 16, 2013	Digital download reissue	Mosley Music Group; Interscope
United States	April 14, 2014	Digital download reissue	Interscope
