= I Lived =

Single by OneRepublic

from the album Native
- Released: 23 September 2014
- Recorded: 2012
- Genre: Pop rock
- Length: 3:55
- Label: Mosley; Interscope
- Songwriters: Ryan Tedder; Noel Zancanella
- Producers: Ryan Tedder; Noel Zancanella

OneRepublic singles chronology
"Love Runs Out" (2014)	"I Lived" (2014)	"Wherever I Go" (2016)

"I Lived" is a song recorded by American pop rock band OneRepublic. It was released on September 23, 2014, as the fifth and final single from the band's third album, Native (2013). It was originally planned to be released as the fourth single in January 2014 but was shelved in favor of "Love Runs Out". It was the final song covered in the series finale of the hit FOX musical comedy-drama Glee in March 2015.

== Conception ==
OneRepublic frontman Ryan Tedder noted that he wrote the song for his four-year-old son. In an interview with People magazine, he said, "The whole idea, to quote the late great Robin Williams from Dead Poets Society, is very much 'carpe diem'." He said that "it's absolutely universal and applicable to everybody." Regarding the lyrics "With every broken bone, I swear I lived", Tedder said, "So for every day that you're on this earth, for every minute that you have, the whole idea is doing nothing less than exactly what you feel you're supposed to do and squeezing every last drop out of life every day, regardless of the difficulties or trials that you face." As with other songs on the Native album, Tedder drew songwriting inspiration from U2, where he focused on writing songs from the heart and from personal experience.

== Music video ==
The music video was released on Vevo and YouTube on September 25, 2014. It is directed by Noble Jones. The idea was from Sophie Muller. The video is dedicated to 15-year-old Bryan Warnecke, a fan of the band, who has cystic fibrosis. Bryan Warnecke talks about living with cystic fibrosis in the music video:

"Cystic fibrosis is a disease that attacks the digestive system and slowly shuts down the lungs. The mucus in everyone else's lungs is more watery, so you guys can clear it easier, but when it comes to my lungs, the mucus is very syrupy. I've been doing my treatments every day of my life, so to me, it's just one of those things that's normal. My name is Bryan Warnecke, and I've been living with cystic fibrosis for 15 years... When I first found out the life expectancy for the first time, it really scared me. Right now, it's up to about 36. It's just one of those things that really make you appreciate life. It makes you appreciate where you are, as a person..."

In the video, Bryan Warnecke is seen bicycling, skateboarding, playing hockey, and enjoying other leisure activities to make the most of his life. He also shares the fear of living with cystic fibrosis: "It feels like I'm breathing through a straw", says Warnecke. "Whenever I try to breathe hard, it hurts. I want to make the most out of my life and have as much fun as I possibly can and my biggest fear is not being able to do that." The clip ends with Warnecke and his dad driving to the Red Rocks Amphitheatre in Colorado to watch Ryan Tedder and the band perform live. A postscript notes that in 2014, "Bryan and his teammates have ridden over 1200 miles and raised $300,000 for Cystic Fibrosis research", and refers viewers to the website of the Cystic Fibrosis Foundation (CFF).

== Promotion and release ==
On July 25, the group played "I Lived" on Today as the viewers' most requested song. They also performed it on The X Factor on October 26.

Remixes have been developed for the single. On September 18, Arty released a remix for the song, which he describes on his website as "taken elements from the original and worked them into a melody-drenched progressive house ballad, successfully repositioning the track for the dance floor." On September 23, the remix EP was released, which included the Arty remix as well as a "gossamery electro-pop" remix from Carousel and a remix by the band Heroic.

On October 1, the group performed the song at the Mercedes-Benz media night for the Paris Motor Show to help launch the B-Class Electric Drive. The car is also featured in the music video.

A remix was produced for the Coca-Cola [RED] campaign to fight AIDS. It was done by Dave Audé and released on November 3, with an iTunes release on November 24.

== Cover versions and usage in media ==
"I Lived" served as the theme song for the 2015 NHL Playoffs. It also served as the tribute song for the retirement ceremony of Detroit Pistons center Ben Wallace at The Palace of Auburn Hills. ESPN has used it on multiple programs, including SportsCenter and First Take, while Jordan Smith, the winner of season 9 of The Voice, sang the song in a promotional music video of NBC for the 2016 Summer Olympics.

The song has been used on the TV shows 90210, The Michael J. Fox Show and Red Band Society, as well as in the 2014 film The Giver. "I Lived" was the final song covered in the series finale of the musical comedy-drama Glee, and was the first song used by Noah Galloway and his partner Sharna Burgess on season 20 of Dancing with the Stars.

NBC used the song in commercials for The Office and Parks and Recreation, while ABC featured it in multiple ads for its 2017 drama The Good Doctor and the final season of Modern Family in 2019. The song is also used as the background music for Huawei Mate 10 commercial, with Naomi Watts and Anna Kendrick.

It was sung by Peter Gallagher in the Season Two series finale titled "Zoey's Extraordinary Goodbye," of Zoey's Extraordinary Playlist.

WWE used the song to pay tribute to John Cena at Saturday Night's Main Event XLII.

== Reception ==
Marcus Floyd of Renowned for Sound gave the single four out of five stars, citing its finger-picking introduction as setting an easy and soothing atmosphere, and calling the overall song a catch and enlightening addition to their singles. Camilla Cassidy of The Edge also gave it four out of five stars, describing the song as an anthem for hope and empowerment, with meaningful lyrics and a wistful tone that inspires listeners, however, she found its delivery to be somewhat absent, and "neither somber nor particularly energetic". Amy Sciarretto of PopCrush described the track as having "a funky, lived-in energy, and is looser than many of its counterparts. It also has more fun than any other track on the record."

Emily Tan of Idolator grouped the song with "Counting Stars" and "Something I Need" as songs that "will keep core fans and AC radio listeners happy". Haley Black of Highlight Magazine while not reviewing the song specifically in her Native review, listed "I Lived" along with "Au Revoir" as a recommended track on the album. Matt Collar of AllMusic grouped the song among the album's "clearing house for mainstream pop sensibilities".

Colin Stutz of Billboard called the music video a touching tribute to Warnecke.

== Track listing ==
- Digital download
1. "I Lived" – 3:55
- EP version
1. "I Lived (Arty Remix)" – 4:26
2. "I Lived (Carousel Remix)" – 3:39
3. "I Lived (Heroic Remix)" – 3:43
4. "I Lived (iTunes Session)" – 3:59
- I Lived ((RED) Remix)
1. "I Lived ((RED) Remix)" – 4:17

== Charts ==
=== Weekly charts ===
Chart (2014–2015)	Peak position
Australia (ARIA)	86
Austria (Ö3 Austria Top 40)	48
Belgium (Ultratip Bubbling Under Flanders)	20
Canada Hot 100 (Billboard)	29
Canada AC (Billboard)	12
Canada CHR/Top 40 (Billboard)	28
Canada Hot AC (Billboard)	13
Czech Republic Airplay (ČNS IFPI)	19
France (SNEP)	108
Germany (GfK)	61
Hungary (Rádiós Top 40)	11
Ireland (IRMA)	44
Italy (FIMI)	18
New Zealand (Recorded Music NZ)	35
Poland Airplay (ZPAV)	18
Slovakia Airplay (ČNS IFPI)	12
Slovenia (SloTop50)	22
Spain (Promusicae)	40
UK Singles (Official Charts)	29
US Billboard Hot 100	32
US Adult Alternative Airplay (Billboard)	13
US Adult Contemporary (Billboard)	11
US Adult Pop Airplay (Billboard)	10
US Dance Airplay (Billboard)	34
US Pop Airplay (Billboard)	18

=== Year-end charts ===
Chart (2014)	Position
Hungary (Rádiós Top 40)	93
Chart (2015)	Position
Hungary (Rádiós Top 40)	86
US Adult Contemporary (Billboard)	29
US Adult Top 40 (Billboard)	32

== Certifications ==
Region	Certification	Certified units/sales
Australia (ARIA)	2× Platinum	140,000^{‡}
Brazil (Pro-Música Brasil)	Gold	30,000^{‡}
Germany (BVMI)	Gold	150,000^{‡}
Italy (FIMI)	Platinum	50,000^{‡}
New Zealand (RMNZ)	3× Platinum	90,000^{‡}
Spain (Promusicae)	Gold	30,000^{‡}
United Kingdom (BPI)	Platinum	600,000^{‡}
United States (RIAA)	4× Platinum	4,000,000^{‡}
^{‡} Sales+streaming figures based on certification alone.

== Release history ==
Release dates and formats for "I Lived"
Region	Date	Format	Label	Ref.
Italy	October 24, 2014	Radio impact	Universal	
