= Waking Up (OneRepublic album) =

Studio album by OneRepublic
- Released: November 13, 2009
- Recorded: Late 2007 – August 2009
- Studios: Abbey Road (London); Home Studios (Germany); MasterMax (Johannesburg); Mastermix (Minneapolis); Metropolis (London); Nine Zero (Boston); Park Hill (Denver); Table Bay (Cape Town); The Warehouse (Vancouver)
- Genre: Pop rock
- Length: 47:34
- Labels: Mosley; Interscope
- Producers: Ryan Tedder; Brent Kutzle; Andy Prickett; Noel Zancanella

OneRepublic chronology
Dreaming Out Loud (2007)	Waking Up (2009)	Native (2013)

Singles from Waking Up
- 1. "All the Right Moves" Released: September 29, 2009; 2. "Secrets" Released: October 30, 2009; 3. "Marchin On" Released: June 18, 2010; 4. "Good Life" Released: November 19, 2010

Waking Up is the second studio album by American pop rock band OneRepublic, released through Mosley Music Group and Interscope Records on November 13, 2009, in Germany and on November 17 in United States. Written and produced largely by lead singer Ryan Tedder while the band was promoting their 2007 debut album in 2008–2009, Waking Up features additional songwriting credits from bandmates Brent Kutzle, Drew Brown, Eddie Fisher, and producer Noel Zancanella. Tedder produced all the eleven songs on the standard edition, four by himself, as the band's effort at the album's concept, which revolves around waking up after nights of bad dreams.

Hoping to experiment with new sounds while maintaining the pop rock identity that characterized their debut album, the band used lightweight synthesizers, orchestra, children's choir, and traditional instruments such as violin, cello, and trilling strings to create a "cinematic experience". The record combines styles of pop rock with eclectic elements including arena rock, Afro pop, drum and bass and Britpop. Inspired by Tedder's feelings after the band rose to fame and attracted the media spotlight, the lyrics explore themes of self-loathing, struggles to stay sober in the face of public exposure, as well as the pursuit of happiness, through lyrics that depict childhood innocence and challenges as a young person.

The album was supported by four singles; "All the Right Moves" was released as the first single in the US, while "Secrets" was released as the first single in Germany, later released as the second single internationally. "Marchin On" and "Good Life" were released as the third and fourth singles, with the latter reaching the top 10 of the US Billboard Hot 100. Critics received the album with generally positive reviews; some took issue with the melodramatic type of melody combined with radio-friendly songwriting, but praised the use of multiple instruments, the album's overall production, and Tedder's signature of building catchy hooks.

Waking Up debuted at number 21 on the US Billboard 200, selling 662,000 copies in 2015 and later being certified double Platinum in the United States. Worldwide, it surpassed 1.2 million copies sold in 2012. To promote the album, OneRepublic embarked on the Good Life Tour (2010–2012), as well as being the opening act on leg 2 of Palm Trees & Power Lines Tour (2010) by Maroon 5.

== Background ==
After the success of OneRepublic's debut album, Dreaming Out Loud, which spawned the hit singles "Apologize" and "Stop and Stare" after massive viral success on MySpace, earning the band a deal with Interscope Records and Timbaland's Mosley Music Group. The latter acted as producer of the "Apologize" remix, giving OneRepublic a song with rhythm and blues sounding. After supporting the 2007 Maroon 5's tour as an opening act, the band began work on a second album in 2008. Despite the commercial success, reviews for the album were mixed, as the band utilized many common pop rock formulas, not taking full advantage of lead singer Ryan Tedder's musical knowledge, who during the period he worked on Dreaming Out Loud, wrote and produced hit songs for American singer Beyoncé and British singer Leona Lewis.

Lead singer Ryan Tedder announced on July 21, 2009, that the band's second album would be completed five weeks from that date which was August 25, 2009. On September 6, 2009, the band posted a low-quality version of the first single from their second album, "All the Right Moves", while a higher quality version could be found on their MySpace page. On September 8, 2009, the band posted samples of 4 of their songs from the new album onto their MySpace page. Eleven songs were announced to make up the track list, which was officially confirmed by Amazon's German site on November 3, 2009.

== Recording and production ==
OneRepublic started recording Waking Up in January 2008, soon after the band moved from Los Angeles and returned to their hometown Denver. Unlike Dreaming Out Loud, which was produced by producer Greg Wells, the band did all the work themselves, with lead singer Ryan Tedder serving as the primary songwriter and producer through all the album. As an ambition to renew itself, Tedder distanced himself from the traditional pop structure of the band's debut album and experimented with stripped-down synthesizers and cello to create an upbeat alternative rock style "that is to be the first genre-less band". He took inspiration from the music of Kanye West, Paul McCartney, and band's like Radiohead and Tears for Fears.

To ensure a smooth transition, Tedder sought to create a concept for songs that fit a formula for OneRepublic and would not become the target of comparisons to his work for other artists. He was fed up with the fact that the hit songs from his previous album had become bigger than the band itself, wanting to get away from "the cookie-cutter way of all the fake bands on the radio now — the disposable pop-rock stuff", and used organic instruments to carry out the conception of Waking Up. The band shared ideas with composer Danny Elfman, using his orchestra of Batman (1989) and Edward Scissorhands (1990) as the center of the album's "more sweeping and cinematic" structure.

Tedder produced all eleven tracks on the standard edition. "Missing Persons 1 & 2" was recorded at the Nine Zero Hotel in Boston and Park Hill Studios in Denver, and is characterized by the use of dubstep drum loops and Afro-pop marimba melody. "Made for You" was recorded at Abbey Road Studios in London, and features a children's choir throughout the song followed by a melodramatic chamber piano, forming part of the album's cinematic concept. "All This Time" and "Fear" were also recorded at Abbey Road Studios, with additional recording at Park Hill Studios. "All the Right Moves", "Secrets", "Everybody Loves Me", "Good Life" and "Waking Up" were recorded at Metropolis Studios in London. Critics noted the theatrical production of "All the Right Moves", containing "electro-charged chamber music", with its pealing organ, trilling strings and vocals inspired by American singer-songwriter Justin Timberlake.

Several critics, including Cross Rhythms' Tony Cummings, noted the funk aesthetic behind "Everybody Loves Me", a track which was additionally recorded at MasterMax Studios in Johannesburg and regarded as a favorite from the album by Tedder. The diversity of styles in the production has been credited to the addition of Brent Kutzle to the band, who was additional producer on the track and four others on the standard edition, and serves as lead bass and cello throughout the album. "Good Life" is an uptempo dance-pop track that incorporates whistling. Described as the "poppiest song on the album", it was one of the last tracks recorded for Waking Up, being composed and produced in thirty days, while the chorus was written by Tedder in sixty seconds after the band had completed the idea for the track.

"Marchin On" was self-written and produced by Tedder over the course of three weeks, and was not originally intended to be featured on the album. It is a danceable Britpop and synth-pop track, and was recorded at The Warehouse in Vancouver and was finished with additional recording at Mastermix Studios in Minneapolis. "All This Time" is a sweet piano ballad inspired by Paul McCartney that features a grand string and violin production performed by The London Studio Orchestra. "Fear" and "Waking Up" also feature strings from the London Studio Orchestra. While the first is a ballad-heavy song, the title track has two parts; the first is a ringing guitar with hard rock influence, while the second features the orchestra with slow range. "Lullaby", the closing track of the standard version, is a heart-bruised alternative rock ballad, echoing similarities to Keane's Tom Chaplin.

== Composition ==
Critics mostly categorize Waking Up as a pop rock album with its tracks containing elements of arena rock, drum and bass, dubstep, Afro pop, funk, and Britpop.

== Title and artwork ==
"It just seemed ironic because the last album was called 'Dreaming Out Loud'. Now we have a song called 'Waking Up'. It was just kind of like this stupid play on words. So we said, 'Hey, that's what the album feels like. It feels like we've woken up to where we are now'."

— Ryan Tedder, on the significance of the album's title.

During the time the band was in Seattle, Washington on Maroon 5's It Won't Be Soon Before Long Tour as the opening act, Jerrod Bettis, who played drummer for OneRepublic at the time, took pictures of cans that referred to the characteristic style of the works of the American painter Jackson Pollock. The band later painted the photos in distinct colors, as a way to symbolize the "hazy feeling of awakening", contrasting the title Waking Up with the title of the band's debut album, Dreaming Out Loud. OneRepublic's drummer Eddie Fisher also add that "Waking Up as a metaphor for like we were Dreaming Out Loud. You know when you're in school and you're like, “I want to be so and so?” That album was dreaming of being on the radio, having videos, touring around the world and playing music. It happened". He also adds that the title contrasts the songs to the overall concept of the album, "like waking up after spending a long time having bad dreams".

== Promotion and release ==
Waking Up was released through Interscope Records on November 17, 2009, in North America, November 20, in Australia, while being released on November 13 in Germany and not until January 18, 2010, in the United Kingdom. A deluxe version of the album was released exclusively in North America at the same time as the standard version. The album was completed on August 25, 2009. The lead single from the album, "All the Right Moves", was released on September 29, 2009, for airplay and officially released on October 6, 2009. The lead single in Germany, "Secrets" was released on October 30, 2009, and it was released as a single in the US on June 1, 2010.

The first single from Waking Up, "All the Right Moves", was released for radio airplay on September 29, 2009, and then received an official release digitally on October 6, 2009. The music video for the single was released on October 8, 2009. It has peaked at number 18 on the Billboard Hot 100. OneRepublic then digitally released "Everybody Loves Me" on October 20, 2009, after having already posted a snippet of the song along with three others on their MySpace page. "Good Life" was then released digitally on November 10, peaking at number 8 on the Billboard Hot 100.

"Secrets" was released as the lead single from the album in Germany for airplay on September 21, 2009, and was released digitally on October 30, 2009, in Germany. It was also released on November 3, 2009, as the album's second digital single in the US. "Secrets" was released as a single in Germany due to the fact that it is being used as the title song in the film Zweiohrküken, the sequel to Keinohrhasen, which used the band's song "Apologize" as the title song. The song was also featured in the 2010 film The Sorcerer's Apprentice.

The song "Marchin On" was selected to support the German TV channel ZDF and serves as the channel's official FIFA 2010 World Cup song. It was released for digital download in Germany on June 18, 2010.

== Critical reception ==
Professional ratings
Aggregate scores
Source	Rating
Metacritic	61/100
Review scores
Source	Rating
About.com	4/5 stars
AllMusic	2.5/5 stars
Billboard	3.5/5 stars
Cross Rhythms	10/10
Entertainment Weekly	B−
Evening Standard	2/5 stars
The Guardian	3/5 stars
Los Angeles Times	3/4 stars
Sputnikmusic	3.0/5

Waking Up received generally positive reviews from music critics. At Metacritic, which assigns a normalized rating out of 100 to reviews from mainstream critics, the album received an average score of 61, based on 9 reviews, which indicates "generally favorable reviews". Los Angeles Times writer August Brown opined that Waking Up "internalized a lot of the things that made Timbaland such a compelling producer; that good sounds are paramount, songs should move in odd directions and many different ideas can constitute a hook", and complimented the tracks "Missing Persons 1 & 2" (for having a "real playfulness"), "Marchin' On" (which "earn[s] the bigness of its flags-and-fighting imagery") and "All This Time" (for its "solo-McCartney goofy sweetness").

Bob Roose of Plugged In (publication) appreciated the album's concept, writing "Waking Up is a wholesale—and wholesome—encouragement to stick to the high ground and the positive things of life". Tony Cummings of Cross Rhythms complements the commentary on Waking Up, "the album have stay-in-the-mind song hooks and production", and praised Tedder's vocals, calling them "haunting". Mikael Wood from the Entertainment Weekly gave a positive review, writing "Waking Up reflects that studio experience with loads of sleek synth licks and juicy percussion tricks; it's much more flavorful than the band's Fray-like debut", praising most of the tracks, but also citing the lack of something that "turns a good song into a great one".

Caroline Sullivan from The Guardian lauded Tedder's melodies and overall production, writing that "every last song is incredibly catchy. [...] A rare instance of Tedder distancing himself from his celebrity buddies to send up their pretensions", appreciating the band's versatility in create "near-genius great choruses". Kelsey Paine from Billboard complemented the album's catchiness, also adding that "OneRepublic still maintains its own graceful and introspective sound". Bill Lamb of About.com praised the album's production values, writing that Waking Up, "is that its a work of expert pop music craft", concluding that "band shows off their versatility in rhythm, instrumentation and mood". Sputnikmusic gave it a positive review, praising the band's ambition to create their own sonic formula and melodic experimentalism, but felt that there is still room for a richer sonic diversity in instrumentals.

In a mixed review, BBC's Mike Diver criticized the lyrics for being (among other things) "saccharine and suffocating of faux-emoting", but admitted that "despite its obvious shortcomings, it's hard to criticize [the album] too heavily", ultimately concluding that it's "oddly admirable". Thomas Erlewine of AllMusic compared the title track to the Killers "only with their goofy pomp replaced with po-faced circumstance", and criticized the album for having "no joy, only dogged diligence, an alienating insistence that texture means more than warmth or melody". Evening Standard's Rick Pearson praised the album's production, but criticized the lack of distinction between tracks and lyricism, which makes the album's overall melody clichéd. In a negative review, Matthew Cole of Slant Magazine gave the album 1.5 of 5 stars and stated that "OneRepublic's music just isn't that interesting".

== Track listing ==
All songs written and produced by Ryan Tedder, except for where noted.

Waking Up – Standard edition
No.	Title	Writer(s)	Producer(s)	Length
1.	"Made for You"	Ryan Tedder; Brent Kutzle	Tedder; Kutzle^{[a]}	4:17
2.	"All the Right Moves"		Tedder; Andy Prickett^{[a]}; Kutzle^{[a]}	3:58
3.	"Secrets"		Tedder; Prickett^{[a]}	3:44
4.	"Everybody Loves Me"	Tedder; Kutzle	Tedder; Prickett^{[a]}; Kutzle^{[a]}	3:34
5.	"Missing Persons 1 & 2"			4:59
6.	"Good Life"	Tedder; Kutzle; Noel Zancanella; Eddie Fisher	Tedder; Kutzle^{[b]}; Zancanella^{[b]}	4:13
7.	"All This Time"	Tedder; Kutzle	Tedder; Kutzle^{[b]}	4:02
8.	"Fear"			3:46
9.	"Waking Up"	Tedder; Drew Brown		6:07
10.	"Marchin On"			4:11
11.	"Lullaby"	Kutzle; Tedder	Tedder; Kutzle; Prickett^{[a]}	4:37
Total length:				47:34

Waking Up – International edition
No.	Title	Writer(s)	Producer(s)	Length
12.	"Sleep"	Tedder; Jerrod Bettis; (Note: While Brown, Filkins, and Myers are all credited, the song was primarily written by Tedder and Bettis.)	Greg Wells	5:53
13.	"Shout" (live in Glasgow)	Roland Orzabal; Ian Stanley		4:24
Total length:				57:11

Waking Up – Deluxe edition (disc 2)
No.	Title	Writer(s)	Producer(s)	Length
1.	"Passenger"	Tedder; Bettis; (Note: Bettis is uncredited.)	Mikal Blue	4:00
2.	"It's a Shame"		Charles Pollard	4:50
3.	"Trap Door"	Tedder; Tim Myers; (Note: Filkins, Brown, and Fisher are credited as co-writers in the GMR database.)	Blue	3:54
4.	"Sucker Punch"	Tedder; Zachary Filkins; Myers	Blue	4:26
5.	"Behind the Scenes"
6.	"Video Footage"
Total length:				77:43

Waking Up – Amazon MP3 Deluxe edition
No.	Title	Writer(s)	Producer(s)	Length
12.	"Passenger"	Tedder; Bettis	Mikal Blue	4:00
13.	"It's a Shame"		Charles Pollard	4:50
14.	"Trap Door"	Tedder; Myers	Blue	3:54
15.	"Sucker Punch"	Tedder; Filkins; Myers	Blue
16.	"Mercy" (Radio 1 Live Lounge; Duffy cover)	Duffy, Steve Booker	Andy Rogers	3:43

Notes

- ^{^[a]} signifies an additional producer
- ^{^[b]} signifies a co-producer

== Personnel ==
All credits for Waking Up are adapted from the album's liner notes.

OneRepublic

- Ryan Tedder – lead vocals, piano, Rhodes, guitar, programming; arrangement (1, 3, 5, 8, 9, 11); whistle (6); string arrangement (9); production (1–11); engineering (1–8, 10, 11)
- Zach Filkins – guitar, viola, slide guitar, background vocals
- Brent Kutzle – cello, bass, guitar, piano, keyboards, background vocals ("Mercy"); arrangement (1, 11); production (11); co-production (6, 7); additional production (1, 2, 4)
- Drew Brown – guitar, glockenspiel, beautiful noises; arrangement (9)
- Eddie Fisher – drums, cajón, percussion

Additional musicians

- Dave McGlohon – background vocals (3)
- The London Studio Orchestra – strings (tracks 7, 8, 9)
- Wil Malone – string arrangement (tracks 7, 8, 9)
- Tim Myers – bass (12, 14–17); songwriting (16, 17)

Technical personnel

- Joe Zook – mixing (1–13); engineering (1–12)
- Noel Zancanella – co-production, additional instrumentation, songwriting (6); engineering (8, 9); assistant engineer (1)
- Andy Prickett – co-production (7); additional production (2–4, 11); engineering (2–4, 7, 11)
- Brian "Big Bass" Gardner – mastering (1–12, 14–17)
- Johan van der Colff – engineering (4)
- Sam Okell – engineering (7–9); assistant engineer (1)
- Eric Olsen – engineering (10); additional engineering (11)
- Jeff Dawson – engineering (10)
- Greg Wells – production; additional keys and guitar (12)
- Mikal Blue – production (14, 16, 17)
- Charles Pollard – production, mixing (15)
- Andy Rogers – production ("Mercy")
- Craig Durrance – mixing (14, 16, 17)
- Bernie Grundman – mastering (13)
- Graphic Theraphy – album design
- Jerrod Bettis – cover art; drum arrangement (12, 14, 15); songwriting (12, 14)
- Timbaland – executive production

== Charts ==
=== Weekly charts ===
2009–2010 weekly chart performance for Waking Up
Chart (2009–2010)	Peak position
Austrian Albums (Ö3 Austria)	28
Belgian Albums (Ultratop Flanders)	87
Belgian Albums (Ultratop Wallonia)	88
Canadian Albums (Nielsen SoundScan)	27
Czech Albums (ČNS IFPI)	43
Dutch Albums (Album Top 100)	88
French Albums (SNEP)	58
German Albums (Offizielle Top 100)	19
Greek Albums (IFPI)	9
Irish Albums (IRMA)	29
Italian Albums (FIMI)	77
Polish Albums (ZPAV)	22
Scottish Albums (Official Charts)	29
Swiss Albums (Schweizer Hitparade)	14
UK Albums (Official Charts)	29
US Billboard 200	21
US Top Alternative Albums (Billboard)	3
US Top Rock Albums (Billboard)	7

2015 weekly chart performance for Waking Up
Chart (2015)	Peak position
Czech Albums (ČNS IFPI)	19

=== Year-end charts ===
Year-end chart performance for Waking Up
Chart (2010)	Position
German Albums (Offizielle Top 100)	90
Swiss Albums (Schweizer Hitparade)	75
US Billboard 200	143
US Top Alternative Albums (Billboard)	40
US Top Rock Albums (Billboard)	43

== Certifications ==
Certifications for Waking Up
Region	Certification	Certified units/sales
Austria (IFPI Austria)	Platinum	20,000^{*}
Denmark (IFPI Danmark)	Gold	10,000^{‡}
Germany (BVMI)	Platinum	200,000^{‡}
New Zealand (RMNZ)	Platinum	15,000^{‡}
Singapore (RIAS)	Gold	5,000^{*}
United Kingdom (BPI)	Silver	60,000^{‡}
United States (RIAA)	2× Platinum	662,000
Summaries
Worldwide	—	1,200,000
^{*} Sales figures based on certification alone.^{‡} Sales+streaming figures based on certification alone.

== Release history ==
Release history for Waking Up
Region	Date	Format	Label
Germany	November 13, 2009	CD, digital download	Interscope
Germany	November 20, 2009	CD	Interscope
Hungary	November 16, 2009	CD	Universal Music Hungary
Hong Kong	November 16, 2009	CD	Interscope
United Kingdom	November 16, 2009	Digital download	Polydor
United Kingdom	January 18, 2010	CD	Interscope
Australia	November 17, 2009	Digital download	Interscope
United States	November 17, 2009	CD, digital download	Interscope
Poland	January 22, 2010	CD	Interscope
Italy	January 22, 2010	CD, digital download	Interscope
Brazil	February 2, 2010	CD	Universal Music Brazil
