= Truth to Power (song) =

2017 promotional single by OneRepublic

Promotional single by OneRepublic

from the album An Inconvenient Sequel: Truth to Power (Music from the Motion Picture)
- Released: June 30, 2017
- Genre: Gospel
- Length: 3:25
- Label: Mosley; Interscope
- Songwriters: Ryan Tedder; T Bone Burnett
- Producers: Tedder; Burnett

Lyric video
- "Truth to Power" Video on YouTube

"Truth to Power" is a song by American band OneRepublic as the promotional single and title song for the documentary An Inconvenient Sequel: Truth to Power about Al Gore's continuing mission to fight climate change. The song was nominated for Best Original Song at the 22nd Satellite Awards and for Original Song in a Documentary at the 8th Hollywood Music in Media Awards.

== Background and composition ==
"Truth to Power" was written and produced by lead singer Ryan Tedder and T Bone Burnett. The lyrics are written from the perspective of Mother Nature speaking to her inhabitants as a call to action against climate change. Gore described the song as capturing Mahatma Gandhi's satyagraha. Tedder described the background for the original composition of the song:

To me, this needed to be reverential. And my default mechanism when writing is very often gospel, and some of the songs that we had done that were referenced when I got brought in are more gospel-leaning records. And when I watched the climactic parts of the film with Vice President Gore giving this speech at Stanford, where he becomes more and more emboldened as the speech goes on, by the end of it, I was like, oh, God, he’s just doing like an altar call right now. And I went to Oral Roberts University, so I’ve seen my fair share of altar calls.

— Ryan Tedder

== Promotion ==
In promotion of the song, OneRepublic performed the song on Late Night with Seth Meyers and at 2017 24-Hours of Reality event.
