= Jerrod Bettis =

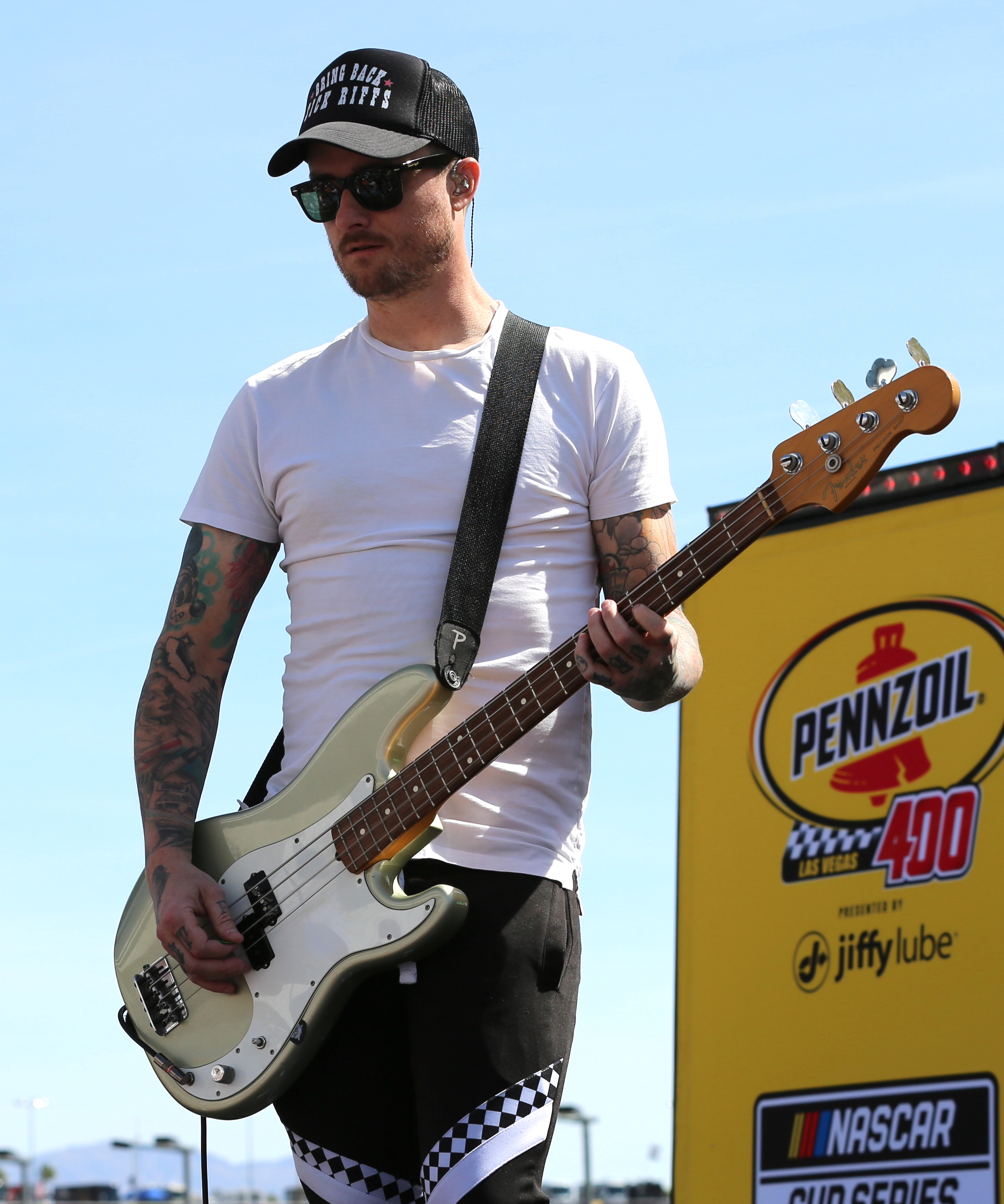
- Bettis at Las Vegas Motor Speedway in 2026

Background information
- Also known as: SKINS
- Born: Abilene, Texas, United States
- Genres: Alternative rock; pop
- Occupations: Producer; composer; performer
- Instruments: Vocals; guitar; keyboards; drums; bass
- Years active: 2002–present
- Formerly of: OneRepublic
- Website: jerrodbettis.com

Jerrod Bettis, also known as SKINS, is an American music producer, composer, and musician. Bettis has composed songs for Adele, the Lonely Island, Melissa Etheridge, KJ-52, and Serena Ryder. He has also produced work for artists including Hilary Duff, Gavin DeGraw, Needtobreathe, Birdy, Etheridge, and the Lonely Island.

Bettis has been nominated for an Emmy Award in 2011 for his work on The Lonely Island's "I Just Had Sex". He was the original drummer for pop-rock band OneRepublic from 2002 until his departure in 2005. He was replaced by Eddie Fisher.
