= Marchin On =

Single by OneRepublic featuring Timbaland

from the album Waking Up
- Released: June 18, 2010
- Recorded: 2009
- Genre: Synth-pop; pop rock; dance-pop
- Length: 4:11
- Label: Mosley; Interscope
- Songwriter: Ryan Tedder
- Producer: Ryan Tedder

OneRepublic featuring Timbaland singles chronology
| "Secrets" (2009) | "Marchin On" (2010) | "Good Life" (2010) |

Timbaland singles chronology
| "If We Ever Meet Again" (2010) | "Marchin On" (2010) | "Pass at Me" (2011) |

"Marchin On" is a song by American band OneRepublic, released on June 18, 2010. It was written and produced by frontman Ryan Tedder for the group's second studio album Waking Up (2009). Producer and rapper Timbaland included a remixed version of the song for his third studio album Shock Value II (2009).

The track was released as the album's third single in German-speaking Europe in June 2010, where it served as German TV channel ZDF's promotional FIFA 2010 World Cup song and it was also used by HBO to promote their 2012 programming line up. The song was used in the episode 20 ("Blood Brothers") of season one of The CW series The Vampire Diaries.

Originally, the song "Good Life" was supposed to serve as the third single, but due to "Marchin On" being selected for FIFA, "Good Life" had to be pushed back to being the fourth single.

== Track listing ==
- CD single/Digital download
1. "Marchin On" (Patriot remix) – 4:15
2. "Marchin On" (OneRepublic & Timbaland) (Timbo version) – 4:12

== Music video ==
The music video was released onto YouTube on June 7, 2010 and features the Patriot Remix. It shows the band dancing and playing different instruments; Drew Brown playing guitar, Eddie Fisher playing drum set and a marching bass drum, Brent Kutzle playing a marching snare drum, Zach Filkins playing a synthesizer and shaker, and Ryan Tedder singing and playing the piano and tambourine. In the background of the video, special effects lighting appears, which gives the video a club vibe. The music video currently has over 34 million views.

== Charts ==
=== Weekly charts ===
| Chart (2010) | Peak position |
|---|---|
| Austria (Ö3 Austria Top 40) | 7 |
| Belgium (Ultratip Bubbling Under Flanders) | 14 |
| Belgium (Ultratip Bubbling Under Wallonia) | 5 |
| Czech Republic (Rádio - Top 100) | 42 |
| Germany (Official German Charts) | 6 |
| Germany Airplay (Official German Charts) | 2 |
| Israel (Media Forest) | 9 |
| Latvia (EHR) | 9 |
| New Zealand (Recorded Music NZ) | 23 |
| Switzerland (Schweizer Hitparade) | 37 |

=== Year-end charts ===
| Chart (2010) | Position |
|---|---|
| Austria (Ö3 Austria Top 40) | 37 |
| Germany (Official German Charts) | 28 |

== Certifications ==
| Region | Certification | Certified units/sales |
|---|---|---|
| Austria (IFPI Austria) | Gold | 15,000^{*} |
| Germany (BVMI) | Gold | 150,000^{‡} |
^{*} Sales figures based on certification alone.^{‡} Sales+streaming figures based on certification alone.
