= All the Right Moves (OneRepublic song) =

Single by OneRepublic

from the album Waking Up
- Released: September 29, 2009
- Recorded: 2008–2009
- Genre: Pop rock
- Length: 3:58
- Label: Mosley; Interscope
- Songwriter: Ryan Tedder
- Producers: Ryan Tedder; Andy Prickett; Brent Kutzle

OneRepublic singles chronology
"Come Home" (2009)	"All the Right Moves" (2009)	"Secrets" (2009)

Audio sample
- file; help

Music video
- "All The Right Moves" on YouTube

"All the Right Moves" is the lead single by American pop rock band OneRepublic from their second studio album Waking Up (2009). It was released to mainstream radio on September 24, 2009 and released for digital download on October 6, 2009. It is the band's first single of the album for all countries except Austria and Germany, where "Secrets" serves as the first single from the new album.

Frontman Ryan Tedder blogged on his Myspace page that before the song's release as a single the band had already performed it live on many occasions. He added, "however the recorded version is quite another animal than what we performed live—it's better, we hope you like it—this might be the most fun energetic song we've ever tackled."

A low quality version of the song was published by the band on September 3, 2009, while a higher quality version of the song can be found on their official Myspace page and official band website. This song was used as the theme song for The CW's reality show, High Society.

== Music video ==
On October 8, 2009, the official music video, directed by Wayne Isham, premiered on VH1.com and on MTV.com. The video features the band playing on a small stage for the attendees at a masquerade ball. As they perform the song, the dancers move in step with the music, while a small well-dressed urchin collects meager donations whilst pickpocketing the miserly dancers. Around the bridge of the song, Ryan Tedder also plays the piano while singing into an antiquated chromed microphone. Although the song, the style and some of the instruments are more modern, the dancers' accouterments, the background props and the dance they perform is decidedly Edwardian. The band has explained that they like an abstract flavor in their music videos so as to allow for a broader range of interpretation. The video peaked at number 4 on the VH1 Top 20 Video Countdown on April 4, 2010. The music video currently has 192 million views.

== Critical reception ==
The song received generally positive reviews. Bill Lamb gave the song 4.5 stars, saying "Lyrically, the exact meaning and point of "All the Right Moves" is somewhat obscure, but the audio textures formed by the words fit perfectly into the sound of the record. The overall feel is of an air of sadness in not quite being able to achieve one's goals and aspirations with another. Regardless of whether you experience a depth of meaning, you are likely to be singing along."

== Track listing ==
- CD single
1. "All the Right Moves" – 3:59
2. "All the Right Moves" (Filthy Dukes remix) – 5:05

== Charts ==
=== Weekly charts ===
Chart (2009–2010)	Peak position
Austria (Ö3 Austria Top 40)	9
Belgium (Ultratop 50 Flanders)	8
Belgium (Ultratop 50 Wallonia)	6
Canada Hot 100 (Billboard)	27
Canada CHR/Top 40 (Billboard)	17
Canada Hot AC (Billboard)	13
CIS Airplay (TopHit)	7
Czech Republic Airplay (ČNS IFPI)	3
Denmark (Tracklisten)	40
Eurochart Hot 100 Singles	18
Finland (Suomen virallinen lista)	17
France (SNEP)	19
Germany (GfK)	14
Hungary (Rádiós Top 40)	31
Ireland (IRMA)	5
Israel (Media Forest)	2
Italy (FIMI)	26
Luxembourg Digital Songs (Billboard)	2
Netherlands (Dutch Top 40)	14
Netherlands (Single Top 100)	42
New Zealand (Recorded Music NZ)	8
Norway (VG-lista)	10
Russia Airplay (TopHit)	3
Scotland Singles (OCC)	17
Slovakia Airplay (ČNS IFPI)	8
Sweden (Sverigetopplistan)	18
Switzerland (Schweizer Hitparade)	2
UK Singles (OCC)	26
US Billboard Hot 100	18
US Adult Contemporary (Billboard)	17
US Adult Pop Airplay (Billboard)	6
US Pop Airplay (Billboard)	12

Chart (2025)	Peak position
Poland (Polish Airplay Top 100)	79

=== Year-end charts ===
Chart (2009)	Position
CIS (Tophit)	149
Switzerland (Schweizer Hitparade)	68
Russia Airplay (TopHit)	135

Chart (2010)	Position
Austria (Ö3 Austria Top 40)	63
Belgium (Ultratop Flanders)	86
Belgium (Ultratop Wallonia)	58
Canada (Canadian Hot 100)	66
CIS (Tophit)	14
European Hot 100 Singles	79
Germany (Official German Charts)	80
Netherlands (Dutch Top 40)	65
Russia Airplay (TopHit)	10
Switzerland (Schweizer Hitparade)	47
US Billboard Hot 100	54
US Adult Top 40 (Billboard)	23
US Mainstream Top 40 (Billboard)	44

2011 year-end chart performance for "All the Right Moves"
Chart (2011)	Position
Russia Airplay (TopHit)	189

2022 year-end chart performance for "All the Right Moves"
Chart (2022)	Position
Hungary (Rádiós Top 40)	90

2023 year-end chart performance for "All the Right Moves"
Chart (2023)	Position
Hungary (Rádiós Top 40)	85

== Certifications ==
Region	Certification	Certified units/sales
Australia (ARIA)	Gold	35,000^{‡}
Austria (IFPI Austria)	Gold	15,000^{*}
Canada (Music Canada)	Platinum	40,000^{*}
Germany (BVMI)	Gold	150,000^{‡}
New Zealand (RMNZ)	Gold	7,500^{*}
Switzerland (IFPI Switzerland)	Gold	15,000^{^}
United Kingdom (BPI)	Silver	200,000^{‡}
United States (RIAA)	4× Platinum	4,000,000^{‡}
^{*} Sales figures based on certification alone.^{^} Shipments figures based on certification alone.^{‡} Sales+streaming figures based on certification alone.

== Release history ==
Country	Date	Format	Label
United States	September 29, 2009	Airplay	Interscope
Russia	October 1, 2009	Contemporary hit radio	Universal Music
United States	October 6, 2009	Digital download	Interscope
United States	October 13, 2009	CD single	Interscope
United Kingdom	January 11, 2010	CD single	
Switzerland	October 16, 2009	Digital download	
Germany	March 5, 2010	CD single	
