= OneRepublic =

American pop rock band

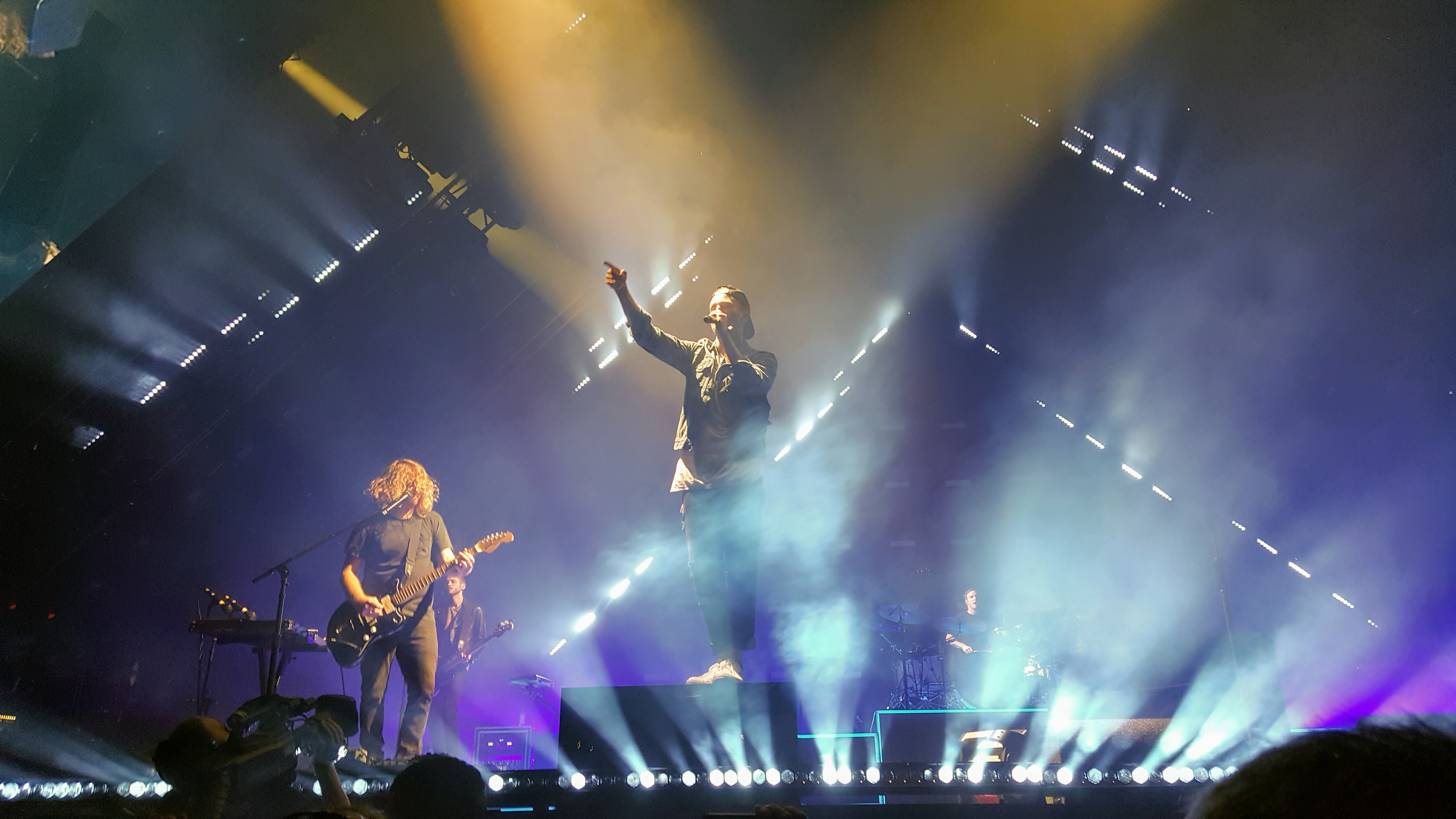
- OneRepublic in 2017

Background information
- Origin: Colorado Springs, Colorado, U.S.
- Genres: Pop; pop rock; alternative rock
- Years active: 2003–present
- Labels: BMG; Columbia; Mosley; Interscope
- Members: Ryan Tedder; Zach Filkins; Drew Brown; Brent Kutzle; Eddie Fisher; Brian Willett
- Past members: Jerrod Bettis; Tim Myers
- Website: onerepublic.com

OneRepublic (often stylized as ONΞREPUBLIC) is an American pop rock band formed in Colorado Springs, Colorado in 2002. The lineup currently consists of Ryan Tedder (lead vocals, piano and tambourine), Zach Filkins (lead guitar, viola and backing vocals), Drew Brown (rhythm guitar and backing vocals), Brent Kutzle (bass guitar, cello and backing vocals), Eddie Fisher (drums, percussion and occasional backing vocals) and Brian Willett (keyboards, synthesizer, piano and backing vocals).

The band achieved its first commercial success on Myspace as an unsigned act. In late 2003, after OneRepublic played shows throughout the Los Angeles area, several record labels approached the band with interest, but the band signed with Velvet Hammer, an imprint of Columbia Records. They recorded their first album with producer Greg Wells during the summer and fall of 2005 at his studio, Rocket Carousel, in Culver City, California, USA. The album was scheduled for release on June 6, 2006, but the group was dropped by Columbia two months before the release date.

In 2007, under Mosley Music Group (an imprint of Interscope Records at the time), OneRepublic released their debut album, Dreaming Out Loud on November 20, 2007 and debuted at number 14 in the US with first week sales of 75,000. Its lead single, "Apologize", was remixed by the label's founder Timbaland, becoming a huge international success, reaching number one in sixteen countries and subsequently earning them a Grammy Award nomination. The second single, "Stop and Stare", mirrored its predecessor's success. The album was later certified Platinum by the Recording Industry Association of America (RIAA). The band's second album, Waking Up (2009), produced the singles "All the Right Moves", "Secrets", "Marchin On", and "Good Life", with the last reaching the top ten of the US Billboard Hot 100.

OneRepublic's third album, Native (2013), became the band's first top ten album on the Billboard 200, as well as their highest-charting, peaking at number four. Its lead single, "If I Lose Myself", peaked within the top ten in several countries, while the album's third single, "Counting Stars", yielded the band's furthest commercial success, peaking within the top five in Australia, Canada, Germany, Ireland, New Zealand, the US, and the UK. It also peaked at number two on the US Billboard Hot 100, matching "Apologize".

OneRepublic's fourth album, Oh My My (2016), was preceded by the singles "Wherever I Go" and "Kids"; it was recognized as a change in their sound from previous albums, by critics and by the band themselves. In 2017, the band released the singles "No Vacancy", "Truth to Power", "Stranger Things" (with Kygo), and "Rich Love" (with Seeb). Their fifth studio album, Human, was released in 2021. The band has sold approximately over 16 million records worldwide. Their sixth studio album Artificial Paradise was released in 2024.

== History ==
=== 1996: Origins ===
The first incarnation of what evolved into OneRepublic formed in 1996 after Ryan Tedder and Zach Filkins befriended each other during their senior year at Colorado Springs Christian High School in Colorado Springs, Colorado. During a drive home, as Filkins and Tedder discussed favorite musicians including Fiona Apple, Peter Gabriel, and U2, they decided to assemble a band. They enlisted a few musical friends and named their rock act This Beautiful Mess—a phrase which first attained cult prominence a year earlier when Sixpence None the Richer released its award-winning second album, This Beautiful Mess. Tedder, Filkins & Co. had a few small gigs at Pikes Perk Coffee & Tea House, attended by friends and family. Senior year ended, and Tedder and Filkins parted ways, each attending different colleges.

=== 2002–2007: Reformation ===
Reuniting in Los Angeles in 2003, Tedder and Filkins formed their second band under the moniker Republic. Tedder, by then an established songwriter and record producer, had convinced Filkins to relocate from Chicago. Nine months later, the band signed with Columbia Records. After a few lineup changes, the group finally settled with Tedder on vocals, Filkins on guitar and backing vocals, Eddie Fisher on drums, Brent Kutzle on bass and cello, and Drew Brown on guitar. The band's name was changed to OneRepublic after the record company mentioned that the name Republic might result in legal action from other, similarly named bands.

The band worked in the studio for two and a half years and recorded its first full-length album. Two months before the album was due to be released, (with "Sleep" as its debut single), OneRepublic was dropped by Columbia Records. The band was beginning to gain prominence on MySpace; Tedder said it was the number-one unsigned act on MySpace, and credits the website for keeping the band together. The band caught the attention of a number of labels, including Timbaland's Mosley Music Group. The band soon signed onto the label, becoming the first rock band to do so.

=== 2007–2011: Dreaming Out Loud and Waking Up ===
OneRepublic's debut album, Dreaming Out Loud, was released on November 20, 2007, and debuted at number 14 in the US with first week sales of 75,000. Critical reception to the album ranged from negative to mixed. Allmusic gave the album a modest review, stating the "album sounds derivative" but also "sounds cohesive and smoothly pleasant". Robert Christgau gave the album a negative review, and termed it a "dud". Rolling Stone gave the album 2 out of 5 stars, but placed the band in its "Artists to Watch" list, which featured ten artists that, according to the magazine, "...are bringing the future of music, today."

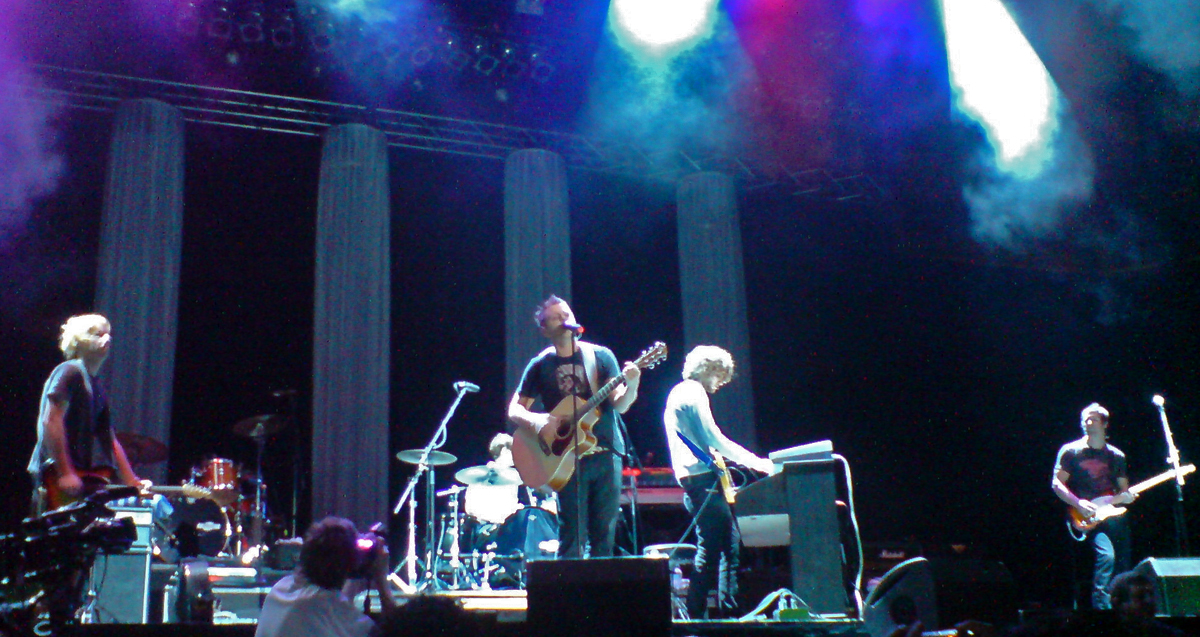
OneRepublic performing in Australia in March 2008

Their lead single, "Apologize", was released in its original version from Dreaming Out Loud. Timbaland, who at the time was one of the most highly visible artists/producers, approached the band to be featured on a compilation album he was working on, Shock Value. Timbaland rearranged the song slightly to give it more of an R&B feel adding backing vocals, guitar bass line, a new drum section, and autotune to the lead vocals. This along with the strong backing of the Timbaland name made it a major hit both in the United States and internationally. It peaked at number one globally, including eight consecutive weeks on the Billboard Pop 100 chart, subsequently reaching the top three of the Billboard Hot 100. The song sold five million copies in the United States alone, receiving a five-times Platinum certification from the RIAA. The song was a massive hit internationally, reaching number one in sixteen countries, including Australia, Austria, Germany, Italy, New Zealand, and Sweden. It also spent thirteen weeks at number one in Canada. It has since been certified over 2× Platinum in 6 countries worldwide, including 4× Platinum in Australia. The song earned the band their first Grammy nomination for best pop performance in a group or duo. The second single from the album, "Stop and Stare", released in March 2008, reached the top ten in eight countries worldwide, including charting at number four in the United Kingdom, and topping the UK Rock Chart. It also reached number twelve on the Billboard Hot 100, and number nine on the Pop 100. Additional singles included "Say (All I Need)" and "Mercy". The album was later certified Platinum in the United States and Germany, as well as Gold in Australia, Austria, and Canada.

OneRepublic's second studio album, Waking Up, was released on November 17, 2009, charting at number 21 on the Billboard 200, and ultimately selling over 500,000 copies in the US and over 1 million worldwide. The lead single, "All the Right Moves", was released on September 9, 2009, peaking at number 18 on the US Billboard Hot 100 and being certified 2× Platinum. "Secrets", the second single from the album, reached the top five in Austria, Germany, Luxembourg, Poland, and on the US Adult Pop Songs and Adult Contemporary charts. It has sold almost 4 million copies in the US as of August 2014. Furthermore, it reached number 21 on the Hot 100. The song was used in television shows such as Gossip Girl, Lost, Nikita and CSI: Miami, as well as in the sci-fi fantasy movie, The Sorcerer's Apprentice and the promos for ABC Family's series Pretty Little Liars. "Marchin On", the album's third single made top ten appearances in Austria, Germany, and Israel, however it was the fourth single "Good Life" that became the band's most successful song from the album, particularly in the US. Released on November 19, 2010, it became their second top-ten single on the Billboard Hot 100 at the time, peaking at number 8 and selling over 4 million copies in the US alone, earning a 4× Platinum certification. Rolling Stone put the song on its list of the best 15 whistling songs of all time. Waking Up was later certified Gold in Austria, Germany, and the US for sales of over 500,000, and has since sold over 1 million copies worldwide.

In 2009, OneRepublic were featured on Leona Lewis's second studio album Echo on the track "Lost Then Found". On June 5, 2010, the band supported Pink on her Funhouse Summer Carnival Tour at Innsbruck. OneRepublic supported Bon Jovi at The O2 Arena for three dates in June 2010. The band supported Maroon 5 for their Palm Trees & Power Lines Tour in fall 2010. In November 2011, OneRepublic released their first Christmas single, titled "Christmas Without You".

=== 2012–2015: Native and international success ===
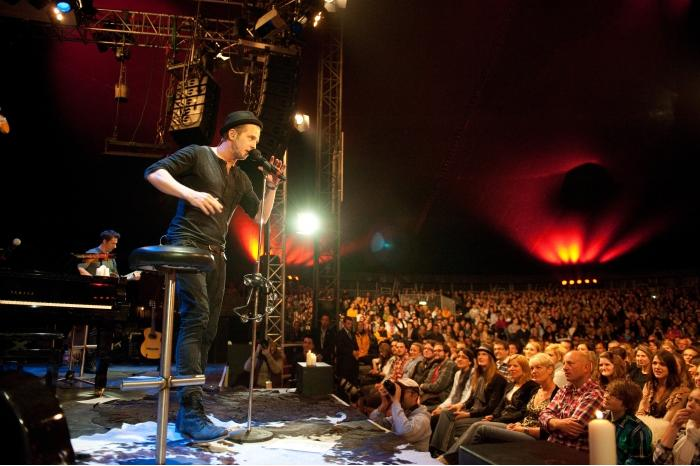
OneRepublic perform at Zermatt Unplugged 2011 in Switzerland

OneRepublic released their third studio album, Native, on March 22, 2013, marking the end of the band's three-and-a-half-year hiatus. The album debuted at number 4 on the Billboard 200 becoming their first top 10 album in the US, with first week sales of 60,000. It was also their best opening sales week since their debut album Dreaming Out Loud which sold 75,000 copies in its first week.

"Feel Again" was released as the lead single on August 27, 2012, however after the album being delayed it was re-branded as a "promotional single". The song was released as a part of Save the Children's Every Beat Matters campaign, where a portion of the proceeds from the single's sales would be donated. It peaked at number 36 on the US Billboard Hot 100, additionally marking the top two positions in Germany and on the US Adult Pop Songs chart. The single was later certified Platinum in the US. The song was used in an official trailer for The Spectacular Now. The album's first global single, "If I Lose Myself" was released on January 8, 2013. It reached the top ten in Austria, Germany, Poland, Slovakia, Sweden, and Switzerland, yet only managed to peak at number 74 on the Billboard Hot 100. The song has since been certified Gold in both Italy and Australia.

The album's third single, "Counting Stars", has become their most successful single from the album thus far and the band's biggest hit. The song achieved significant international success, charting within the top five in Australia, Austria, Czech Republic, Denmark, Germany, Hungary, Ireland, Israel, Luxembourg, Poland, New Zealand, Scotland, Slovakia, and Spain. It reached number 1 in the UK, marking the band's highest-charting song ever in that country, while also peaking at number 2 on the US Billboard Hot 100, their first song to crack the top 5 since Apologize. The song has since peaked at number 1 in 5 countries worldwide and has gone 5× platinum in Australia, 2× Platinum in New Zealand, Platinum in the UK, Gold in Switzerland and Germany, as well as currently holding a Diamond certification in the US. On October 29, 2015, the video for "Counting Stars" became the first video by a band to reach 1 billion views on YouTube. As of July 2024, the music video has over 4 billion views and over 17 million likes and is the 18th most watched YouTube video.

On April 3, 2013, the band embarked on their headlining concert tour Native Tour in promotion for the album, beginning in Europe. This ran throughout 2013/14 and saw the band perform shows across Europe, North America, Asia and Australia, and New Zealand. The 2013 North American tour was a co-headlining tour with singer-songwriter Sara Bareilles, while the 2014 Native Summer Tour was a co-headlining tour with The Script and American Authors. The tour finished in Russia on November 9, 2014, marking a total of 169 shows and the band's largest tour to date. The album's fourth single, "Something I Need", was released on August 25, 2013. Despite little promotion of the song upon its release due to the late and unexpected success of "Counting Stars", the song has still managed to be certified 2× Platinum in Australia and Platinum in New Zealand as of December 2013.

On April 8, 2014, OneRepublic confirmed via Twitter that their new song, "Love Runs Out", recorded at Studio Faust Records in Prague, would be released. Tedder said that the band had intended the song to be the first single on Native, but that he could not think of a chorus for the song, so the song's release was delayed. The song was added as the second track on the album's re-release on April 14. It was also an internationally successful track, breaking the top 5 in Austria, Germany, Canada, Switzerland, and the UK; and reaching the top 15 on the US Billboard Hot 100 chart. It is used as the promotional song for the show How to Get Away with Murder.

In September 2014, OneRepublic released the music video for "I Lived", the sixth single off their Native album. Tedder noted that he wrote the song for his 4-year-old son. The related video raises awareness of cystic fibrosis by featuring a 15-year-old named Bryan Warnecke who lives with the condition. A remix was released for the Coca-Cola [RED] campaign to fight AIDS.

=== 2015–2017: Oh My My ===
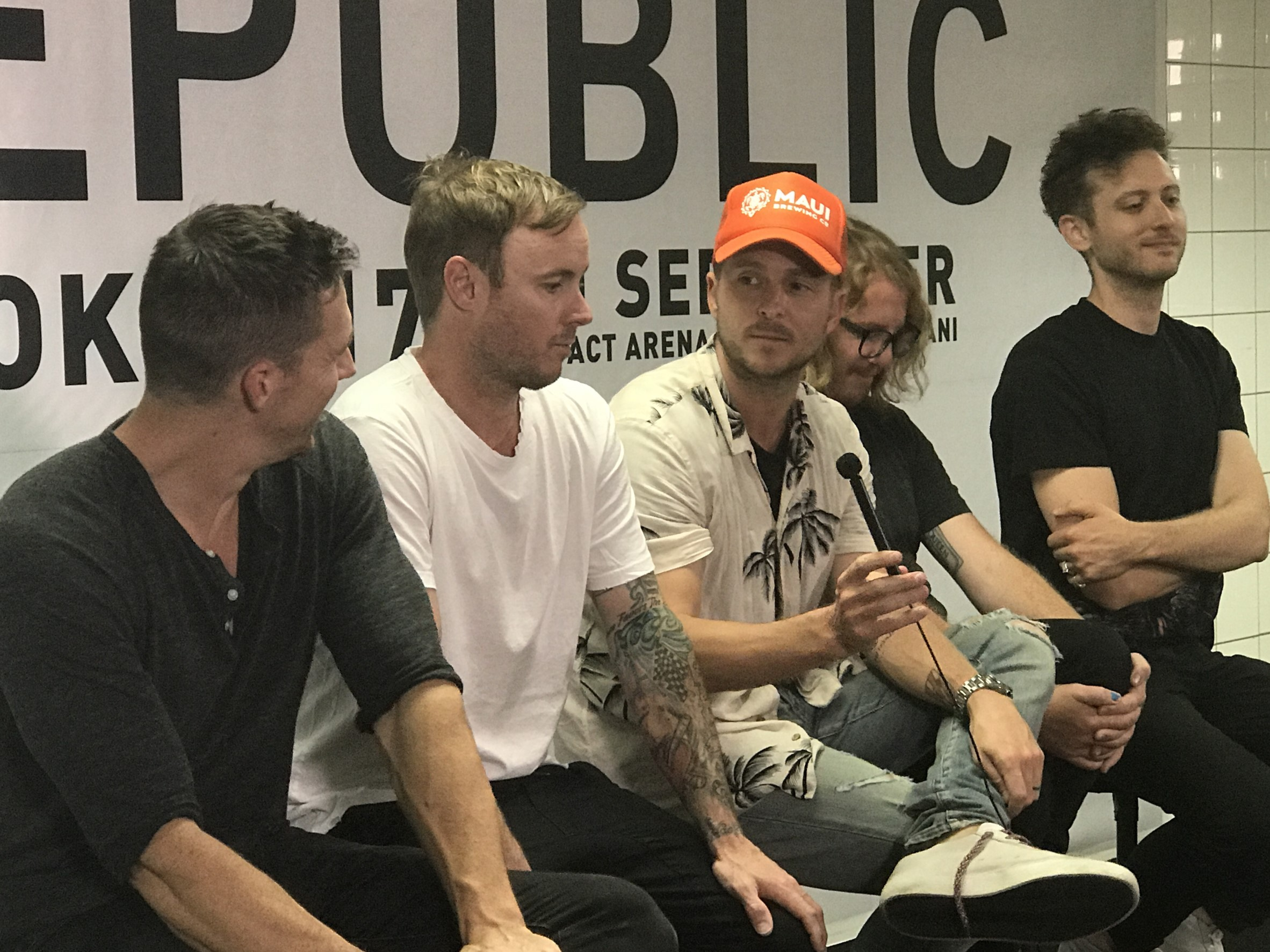
OneRepublic in Bangkok, 2017

In November 2014, the group tweeted photos captioned: "Hotel recording, Poland. Album 4". and "Mid-afternoon, working on new album, and this is the view ..... LP 4 is fun already" In April 2015, Ryan Tedder stated in an interview that OneRepublic was going in a whole new direction and they are yet to recycle the same sound once on any song that they have ever put out. Guitarist Drew Brown says that they are excited about it and they think that it is the best thing they have ever done. In June 2015, Tedder said that they were working on a song called 'Colors', which he said is one of his favorite songs going on the album. In that same month, they showed a video with them working on new melodies for the album.

In September 2015, it was confirmed that the band's fourth upcoming studio album would be released in early 2016. On September 9, at one of Apple's media events, held at the Bill Graham Civic Auditorium in San Francisco, Apple CEO Tim Cook concluded the event by introducing the band for a surprise performance, a 3-song set. In November, OneRepublic said on Twitter, "Yes, We are looking at a window for 1st single now, can't say what it is yet, but it's coming in the new year. Gotta narrow down songs now!" On April 18, 2016, the band posted a handwritten letter on their website and they set a countdown to May 12 at 9 PM. They started sending postcards to fans all over the world saying that the lead single from the 4th album is called "Wherever I Go". On May 9, OneRepublic announced that they would release their new song on May 13. They will perform the single at the finale of The Voice of Italy on May 25, 2016. They played at MTV Music Evolution Manila 2016 on June 24 and at BBC Radio 1's Big Weekend in Exeter on Sunday, May 29.

On May 13, 2016, the first single "Wherever I Go" of the upcoming album was released. On August 3, the album's second single, "Kids", was announced. The song was released on August 12. On August 25, OneRepublic posted that the album would be called Oh My My, with a release date of October 7, 2016. The following week, the album's artwork was revealed. Oh My My became the band's highest-charting debut to date, landing at No. 3 on the Billboard 200. On October 11, 2016, OneRepublic announced on their Twitter account that they would be releasing singles through 2018. On November 27, 2016, OneRepublic performed at halftime of the 104th Grey Cup at BMO Field in Toronto (the championship game of the Canadian Football League). On December 6, 2016, the band released their third single, "Let's Hurt Tonight", along with its music video, making it the soundtrack of the movie Collateral Beauty. On February 16, 2017, the band were headlined at the 2017 Honda Civic Tour, which began on July 7, 2017. The song "Lift Me Up", from the Oh My My album, was released as a promotional single on June 9, 2017, in the form of a remix by Michael Brun.

=== 2017–2019: Standalone singles ===
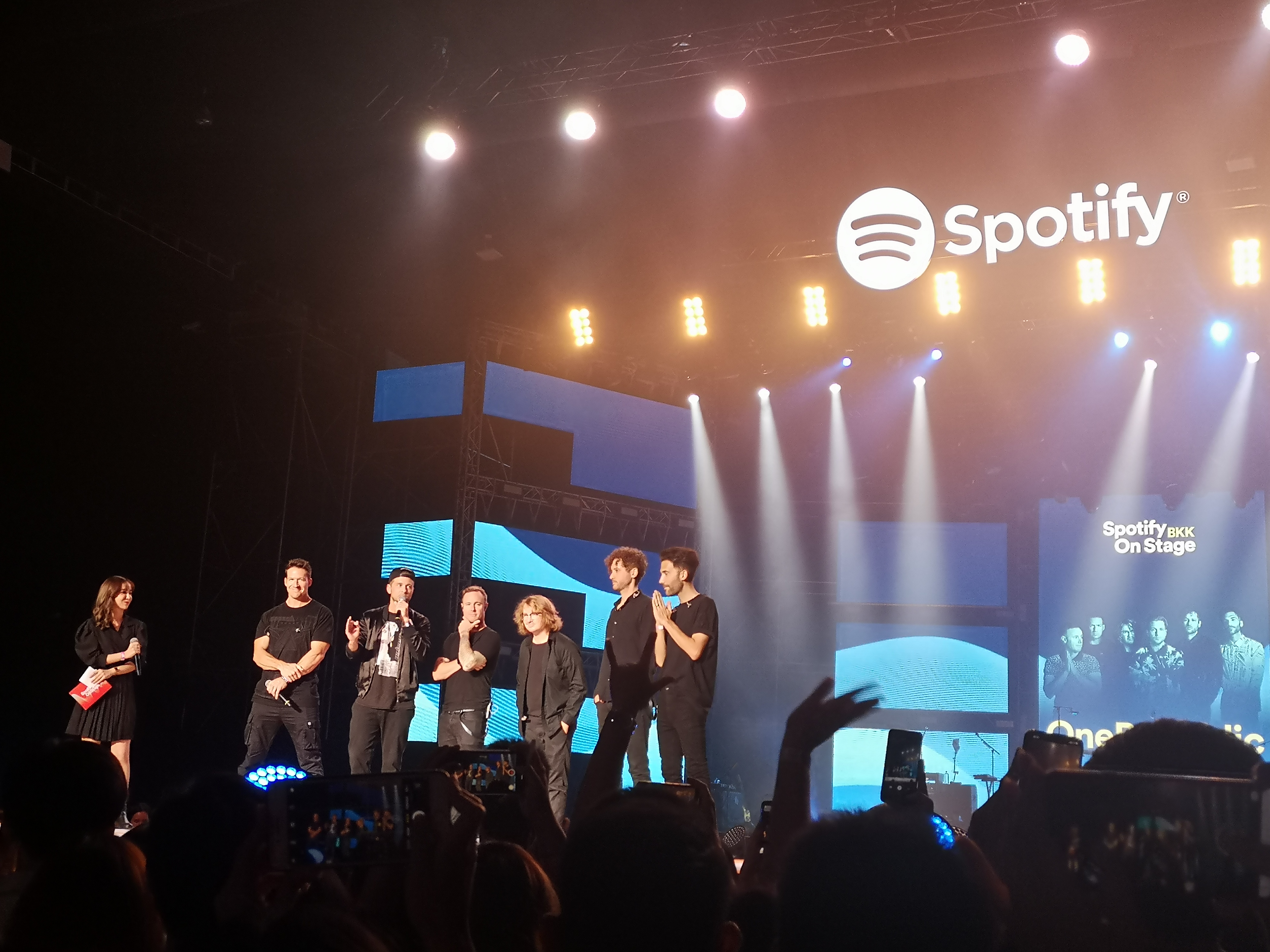
OneRepublic at Spotify On Stage BKK 2019

On April 27, 2017, OneRepublic lead vocalist and principal songwriter Ryan Tedder published a Facebook post revealing the band's future in releasing new material. In the post, he stated that he dealt with "crippling anxiety" and became ill due to constant touring, recording, and promoting the band's releases. He clarified that OneRepublic would release "new music as often as humanly possible... monthly, weekly sometimes", departing from the typical album cycle system. Singles they released in 2017 included "No Vacancy", "Truth to Power", "Rich Love", and "Born to Race". In September 2017, Tedder stated at a concert that the band had started work on their fifth studio album that was due to be released sometime in 2018. He estimated that there would be 7–8 songs on the album. Also, they featured on Kygo's song "Stranger Things" for his second studio album Kids in Love, released in 2017.

The band opened up for the Zac Brown Band on select dates of their Down the Rabbit Hole Live tour in summer 2018. On May 16, 2018, "Start Again", a single featuring Logic, was released on YouTube and other various platforms. The single is part of the Season 2 soundtrack for the Netflix series, 13 Reasons Why. On June 26, 2018, OneRepublic released the single "Connection". On November 9, 2018, OneRepublic released a cover of the song "White Christmas" for a Jeep commercial. On January 3, 2019, Ryan Tedder announced via their official Twitter that a new album was coming sometime in 2019. It had been scheduled to be released in 2018. On January 31, 2019, OneRepublic and Galantis released their song "Bones".

=== 2019–2021: Human ===
On May 17, 2019, OneRepublic released the lead single "Rescue Me" of their then-untitled fifth studio album. On August 27, 2019, OneRepublic announced their next single "Wanted", which was released on September 6, 2019. A promotional single, "Somebody to Love", was released on September 11, the day of the season finale of Songland. On September 15, 2019, Tedder announced that their fifth studio album would be called Human, and would be released in November 2019. He also confirmed that "Rescue Me" and "Wanted" would be included on the album. However, on November 19, 2019, Tedder said that the album was planned to be released in spring 2020. On October 6, 2019, the band were the headline performance at the 2019 NRL Grand Final (National Rugby League) at ANZ Stadium.

On January 22, 2020, Tedder announced over Instagram that the new album would be wrapped by March. On March 10, 2020, the band announced their next single "Didn't I", which was released on March 13, 2020. Human was announced on the same day to be set for release on May 8, 2020. "Better Days" was released as the fourth single from Human on March 25, 2020, with all proceeds donated to MusiCares. As a result of the COVID-19 pandemic "requiring [the band] to distance [themselves] from each other and [fans]," in a statement to social media on April 8, 2020, the band announced the release of Human to have been postponed. It was "delayed indefinitely until fall." It was then delayed until 2021. On May 15, 2020, the band released a new single with Kygo titled "Lose Somebody", which appears on Kygo's third studio album Golden Hour. On September 25, 2020, the band released "Wild Life" from the Disney+ movie Clouds.

On May 5, 2021, the band released the fifth single from Human, called "Run". On July 1, 2021, the band announced that the album would be released on August 27, 2021. The song "Someday" was released the same day. OneRepublic performed a livestreamed concert, One Night in Malibu, on October 27 and 28 through online platform Moment House in support of the release of Human. The concert took place at sunset in Malibu, California.

=== 2021–2024: Artificial Paradise and departure from Interscope ===
On November 1, 2021, OneRepublic released the song "Sunshine". The song is used as the theme song to the 2021 film Clifford the Big Red Dog. On November 4, the band covered "We Are the Champions" as part of The Queen Family Singalong on ABC. The band became the first major U.S. artist to accept cryptocurrency as payment for a live concert after they accepted payments through the bitcoin app Strike for their November 16 concert in Haydn Hall in Vienna.

In February 2022, OneRepublic released the song "West Coast". On April 1, OneRepublic released "You Were Loved" as a single with DJ and producer Gryffin. On May 13, 2022, the band released "I Ain't Worried", the second single from the soundtrack for the film Top Gun: Maverick. On January 31, 2023, Ryan Tedder confirmed in The Great Creators with Guy Raz that he will upload song teasers on social media, and let the public choose the next single. On May 26, 2023, OneRepublic released the single "Runaway", which charted at number 58 on the Irish Singles Chart and number 6 on the Dutch Top 40. On September 22, OneRepublic released the single "Mirage" featuring Mishaal Tamer for Assassin's Creed Mirage. A music video was released alongside the song. They also released the Christmas single "Dear Santa" on October 21.

The band released the single "I Don't Wanna Wait" with French producer David Guetta. The song interpolates O-Zone's "Dragostea Din Tei". The band released the ending theme song "Nobody" for the anime Kaiju No. 8 which premiered on April 13, 2024. The band released the song "Fire" with Meduza and Leony in promotion of the UEFA Euro 2024. OneRepublic announced their sixth album on June 6, 2024, and the first single released after the album announcement was "Hurt" on July 5.

The band released their sixth studio album Artificial Paradise on July 12, 2024. The super deluxe edition was released December 6. That month, the band also played at the Toronto KPMG holiday christmas party.

=== 2025–present: Upcoming seventh studio album and signing to BMG ===
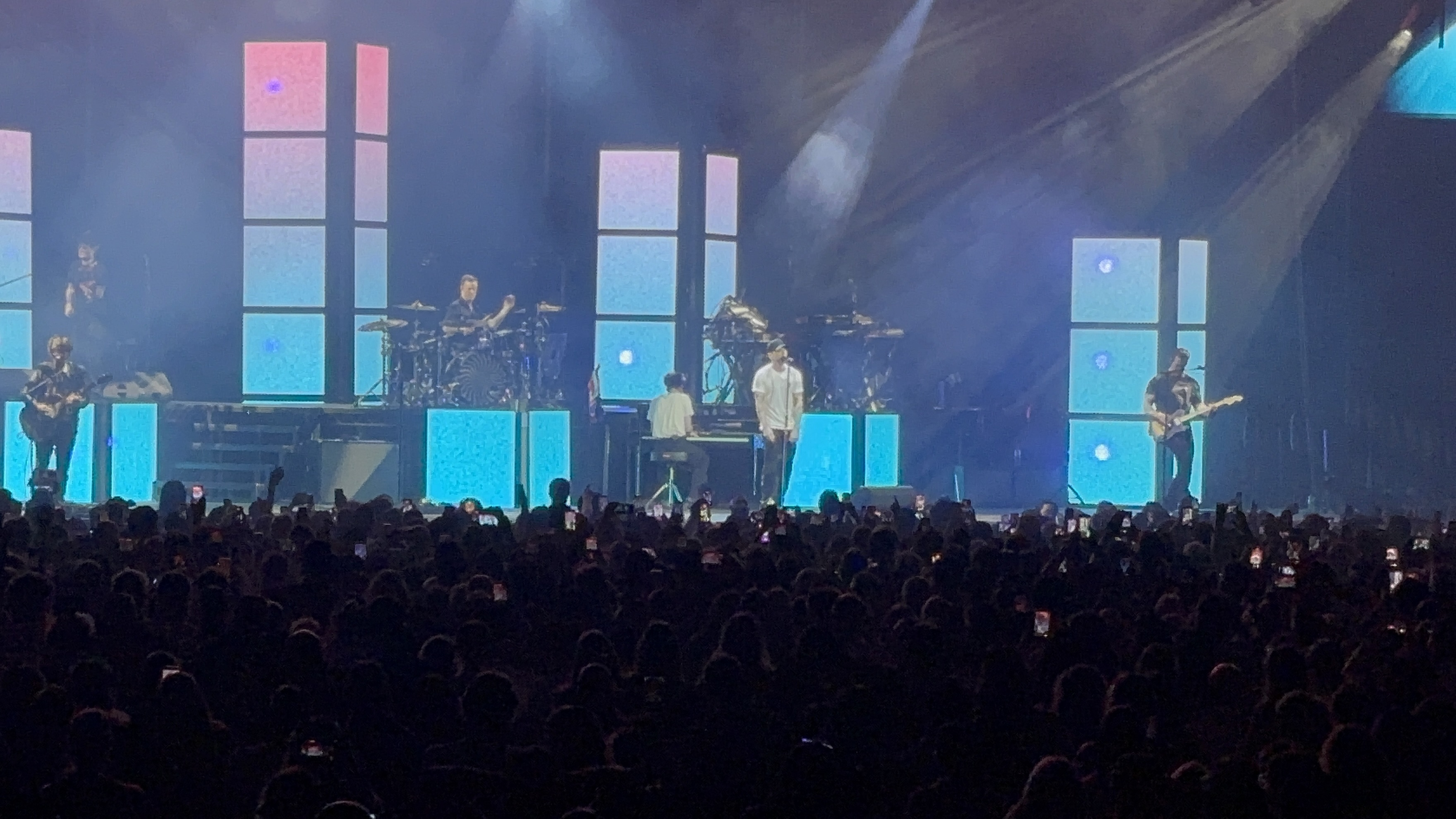
OneRepublic performing in Sydney, Australia in February 2026

On January 28, 2025, the band performed the song 'Counting Stars' on the Spring Festival Gala hosted by the state-run China Media Group, which is the most-watched programs in China. Due to the tense relations between China and the United States, it is rare for American artists to appear on this program.

On January 24, 2025, the band released their third song with Kygo, "Chasing Paradise". On February 27, they released "Tell Me" with Karan Aujla and Ikky. "Invincible", from Kaiju No. 8, was released April 18. On June 20, they released "Starlight (The Fame)" with The Supermen Lovers, a remix of his debut single "Starlight".

On May 26, 2025, the band announced they would be returning to Australia and New Zealand for "The Sweet Escape" Tour in 2026.

On July 10, 2025, the band announced they had signed to BMG after 18 years with Mosley and Interscope Records. The first single released under BMG was "Beautiful Colors" on July 25, their third song for Kaiju No. 8 and inaugural single for their forthcoming seventh studio album.

On December 12, 2025, the band released the track "Give Me Something" from the video game Arknights: Endfield. The track debuted live at The Game Awards 2025.

On March 12, 2026, the band released the track "Lean" as the 2026 theme song for PUBG Mobile and its 8th anniversary. It was released exclusively in-game within the "Beyond Battle Royal" update, and is expected to release on streaming services in the near future.

On April 3, 2026, the band released the second confirmed single from their upcoming seventh studio album, "Need Your Love". The band had previewed the song multiple times while on the Escape to... Tour in late 2025 into 2026.

On June 5, 2026, the band released the song "In Your Eyes" with Alesso.

On August 28, 2026, the band released the single "Pay That Toll".

== Musical style and influences ==
OneRepublic's varied style of music has been described by Ryan Tedder: "We're no respecter of genre. If it's a good song or a good artist whether rock, pop, indie or hip hop, they've probably influenced us on some level... nothing's new under the sun, we're a sum of a bunch of parts." Specific artists whom OneRepublic have cited as influences include Wolfgang Amadeus Mozart, the Beatles, Nickelback, U2, M83, and Prince.

== Band members ==
Current

- Ryan Tedder – lead vocals, keyboards, piano, guitars, percussion, occasional bass (2003–present)
- Zach Filkins – lead guitar, viola, backing vocals (2003–present)
- Drew Brown – rhythm guitar, keyboards, percussion, backing vocals (2004–present)
- Eddie Fisher – drums, percussion, occasional backing vocals (2005–present)
- Brent Kutzle – bass, cello, backing vocals, keyboards, rhythm guitar (2007–present)
- Brian Willett – keyboards, piano, synths, percussion, violin, backing vocals (2019–present, touring 2012–2019)

Former

- Jerrod Bettis – drums, percussion (2003–2004)
- Tim Myers – bass, backing vocals (2003–2007)

Touring

- Andy Prickett – lead guitar, backing vocals (2010)
- Ashley Clark – violin, rhythm guitar, percussion, backing vocals (2021–present)

== Discography ==
- Dreaming Out Loud (2007)
- Waking Up (2009)
- Native (2013)
- Oh My My (2016)
- Human (2021)
- Artificial Paradise (2024)

== Tours ==
Headlining

- Tag This Tour (2008–2009)
- Good Life Tour (2010–2012)
- Native Tour (2013–2015)
- 16th Annual Honda Civic Tour (2017)
- Live in Concert (2022)
- Never Ending Summer Tour (2022)
- The Artificial Paradise Tour (2024)
- Escape to… Tour (2025–2026)

Supporting

- It Won't Be Soon Before Long Tour (with Maroon 5)
- Palm Trees & Power Lines Tour (with Maroon 5)
- Down the Rabbit Hole Live (with Zac Brown Band)
- The Joshua Tree Tour 2017 (with U2)
- Love Is Like Tour (with Maroon 5)
- The Circus Live - Summer 2026 (with Take That)

== Awards and nominations ==
OneRepublic have won several music awards and landed many nominations, including ones for American Music Awards, Billboard Music Awards, World Music Awards, and Grammy Awards. Separately, lead singer Ryan Tedder has won three Grammy Awards due to his songwriting credits for Adele and Taylor Swift.
