= Secrets (OneRepublic song) =

Single by OneRepublic

from the album Waking Up
- Released: October 30, 2009
- Recorded: 2008–2009
- Genre: Pop rock; cello rock
- Length: 3:44
- Label: Mosley; Interscope
- Songwriter: Ryan Tedder
- Producers: Ryan Tedder; Andy Prickett

OneRepublic singles chronology
"All the Right Moves" (2009)	"Secrets" (2009)	"Marchin On" (2010)

Audio sample
- file; help

"Secrets" is a song by American pop rock band OneRepublic, released on October 30, 2009 as the second single from their second studio album Waking Up (2009). It was released as the first single in Germany and Austria owing to its presence on the soundtrack of Til Schweiger's film Zweiohrküken. The movie is the sequel to the film Keinohrhasen, for which "Apologize" was the film soundtrack. The song rocketed up the German and Austrian airplay charts. The song was released in the United States iTunes Store on November 3, 2009. The song was due for a UK release on April 5, 2011 but was later canceled. It was sent to U.S. Top 40/Mainstream radio on June 1, 2010. "Secrets" is written in the key of D major.

== Critical reception ==
John Hill from About.com rated it with 4.5 stars (out of 5), praising OneRepublic frontman Ryan Tedder for bringing nuance to the lyrics. Hill writes "The song starts out more like a conversation, but turns into a powerful plea by the time the chorus comes around." Hill speculates as to the meaning of this plea but thinks it best that listeners find their own meaning.

== Music videos ==
The music video debuted on German television on October 16, 2009. It shows the band playing their instruments and Ryan Tedder singing. Furthermore, it features scenes from the film Zweiohrküken.

A second version of the video, was released as a promo for the premiere of the sixth season of the US TV series Lost. This version has takes from the original video, with the band playing on a studio, mixed with scenes from the series.

A third version, the music video that is used worldwide, has scenes from the original video with clips of a woman played by Nora Tschirner waiting for someone at a restaurant. The restaurant is the outdoor seating area of Wynkoop Brewing, located in an area of Denver known as LoDo. All of exterior shots are also in Denver on the surrounding streets, Blake Street, 17th Street, Wazee Street, Wynkoop Street and alley. Other notable landmarks in the video are Union Station and Coors Field. It premiered May 17, 2010 on Vevo.

A fourth version of the video features scenes from the Disney feature film The Sorcerer's Apprentice.

== Commercial performance ==
"Secrets" debuted at No. 98 on the Billboard Hot 100 and later re-entered at No. 83, reaching its peak at No. 21. It is chronologically their fourth top 40 hit on the Billboard Hot 100. The song has sold 3,070,000 digital copies in the US as of January 2014.

== In popular culture ==
"Secrets" was featured in the television shows 30 Rock, Gossip Girl, Lost, Nikita and CSI: Miami and appeared in the Disney film The Sorcerer's Apprentice. The song also used to launch the "Big Pony" fragrance line for Ralph Lauren. An instrumental version of "Secrets" also featured prominently in the FaceTime portion of Apple's iPhone 4 video introduction in 2010. In the same year, it was used in many promotional trailers for ABC Family's TV series Pretty Little Liars. In 2011, the song was featured as runway soundtrack at the Victoria's Secret Fashion Show.

== Track listing ==
Digital download
No.	Title	Writer(s)	Producer(s)	Length
1.	"Secrets"	Ryan Tedder	Tedder, Andy Prickett (add.)	3:44

CD single
No.	Title	Writer(s)	Producer(s)	Length
1.	"Secrets"	Tedder	Tedder, Prickett (add.)	3:42
2.	"Come Home" (featuring Sara Bareilles)	Tedder	Tedder	4:19

== Charts ==
=== Weekly charts ===
Chart (2009–11)	Peak position
Australia (ARIA)	93
Austria (Ö3 Austria Top 40)	4
Belgium (Ultratip Bubbling Under Flanders)	15
Canada Hot 100 (Billboard)	32
Canada AC (Billboard)	32
Canada CHR/Top 40 (Billboard)	32
Canada Hot AC (Billboard)	18
Czech Republic Airplay (ČNS IFPI)	31
Germany (GfK)	3
Hungary (Rádiós Top 40)	34
Italy (FIMI)	77
Luxembourg Digital Songs (Billboard)	2
Netherlands (Dutch Top 40)	15
Netherlands (Single Top 100)	57
New Zealand (Recorded Music NZ)	27
Poland Airplay (ZPAV)	1
Russia Airplay (TopHit)	29
Scottish Singles Sales (Official Charts)	52
Switzerland (Schweizer Hitparade)	19
UK Singles (Official Charts)	77
US Billboard Hot 100	21
US Adult Alternative Airplay (Billboard)	28
US Adult Contemporary (Billboard)	5
US Adult Pop Airplay (Billboard)	3
US Dance Club Songs (Billboard)	28
US Pop Airplay (Billboard)	13

=== Year-end charts ===
Chart (2009)	Position
Austria (Ö3 Austria Top 40)	50
Germany (Media Control AG))	60

Chart (2010)	Position
Austria (Ö3 Austria Top 40)	69
Germany (Media Control AG)	87
Netherlands (Dutch Top 40)	85
Russia Airplay (TopHit)	184
US Billboard Hot 100	76
US Adult Top 40 (Billboard)	31
US Mainstream Top 40 (Billboard)	50

Chart (2011)	Position
US Adult Contemporary (Billboard)	9
US Adult Top 40 (Billboard)	16

== Certifications ==
Region	Certification	Certified units/sales
Australia (ARIA)	2× Platinum	140,000^{‡}
Austria (IFPI Austria)	Platinum	30,000^{*}
Brazil (Pro-Música Brasil)	Platinum	60,000^{‡}
Denmark (IFPI Danmark)	Gold	45,000^{‡}
Germany (BVMI)	3× Gold	450,000^{‡}
Italy (FIMI)	Gold	25,000^{‡}
New Zealand (RMNZ)	2× Platinum	60,000^{‡}
Spain (Promusicae)	Gold	30,000^{‡}
United Kingdom (BPI)	Gold	400,000^{‡}
United States (RIAA)	7× Platinum	3,070,000
^{*} Sales figures based on certification alone.^{‡} Sales+streaming figures based on certification alone.

== Release history ==
Country	Date	Format
Germany	September 21, 2009	Airplay
Germany	October 30, 2009	CD; digital download
United States	June 1, 2010	Airplay
