= Noel Zancanella =

American record producer and songwriter from Colorado

- Birth name: Noel Patrick Zancanella
- Born: Denver, Colorado, U.S.
- Occupations: Record producer; songwriter

Noel Patrick Zancanella is an American record producer and songwriter based in Los Angeles, California. He has written and produced songs for rock and pop artists such as Taylor Swift, OneRepublic, Maroon 5, B.o.B., Gym Class Heroes, Gavin DeGraw, and Colbie Caillat.

== History ==
Since 2009, Zancanella has been signed to Patriot Games Publishing, a company founded by Ryan Tedder. The signing came through Zancanella co-writing OneRepublic's hit "Good Life", which peaked at number eight on the Billboard Hot 100 chart.

In 2015, Zancanella received the Songwriter of the Year Award at the BMI Pop Awards.

In 2016, he won the Grammy Award for Album of the Year for his production with Taylor Swift and Ryan Tedder of Swift's fifth album 1989, including "Welcome to New York" and "I Know Places".
