= Eddie Fisher (drummer) =

American musician and songwriter

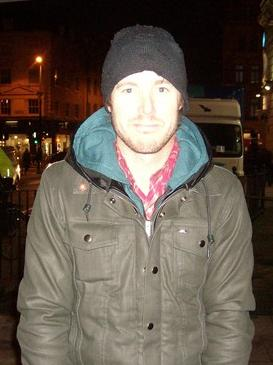

Background information
- Born: Eddie Ray Fisher; December 17, 1973 (age 52); Hillsboro, Oregon, U.S.
- Origin: Mission Viejo, California, U.S.
- Genres: Pop rock; pop; alternative rock
- Occupations: Musician; songwriter
- Instruments: Drums; percussion; guitar; piano
- Label: Interscope
- Member of: OneRepublic

Eddie Ray Fisher (born December 17, 1973) is an American musician and songwriter. He is the drummer for the pop rock band OneRepublic. Eddie grew up in Mission Viejo, California and currently resides in Denver, Colorado, where OneRepublic is based. Fisher joined OneRepublic in 2005, and has been the band's drummer ever since.

== Personal life ==
Fisher became interested in drumming when he was in seventh grade after he saw a U2 concert in the Tempe Stadium, Arizona. Eddie has been married to Rhiannon Adler since 2017.

== OneRepublic ==
He joined OneRepublic in 2005 after playing with the band's former bassist. Fisher has been credited for writing songs such as: "Say (All I Need)", "Stop & Stare", "Someone to Save You", "Won't Stop" and "All Fall Down" off OneRepublic's debut album, Dreaming Out Loud. He also contributed to writing the single "Good Life" from the band's second album, Waking Up. He did not write any songs on their third album, Native. Fisher also helped co-write the song "Colors" on the international deluxe edition of their fourth album, Oh My My.

== Outside of OneRepublic ==
Fisher is known to have drummed on numerous tracks for the band The Violet Burning. He is credited for drumming on tracks such as "Save You" and "If I Can't Have You" (Kelly Clarkson). He also drummed on the track "Please Don't Stop The Rain" (James Morrison). He also writes songs for other artists.
