= Good Life (OneRepublic song) =

2009 single by OneRepublic

Single by OneRepublic

from the album Waking Up
- Released: November 19, 2010
- Recorded: 2008
- Genre: Pop rock
- Length: 4:13 (album version); 4:05 (new mix version); 4:12 (Demolition Crew remix); 3:50 (remix featuring B.o.B)
- Label: Mosley; Interscope
- Songwriters: Ryan Tedder; Brent Kutzle; Staggs Dayna Sr; Noel Zancanella; Eddie Fisher
- Producers: Tedder; Kutzle; Zancanella

OneRepublic singles chronology
"Marchin On" (2010)	"Good Life" (2010)	"Feel Again" (2012)

Music video
- "Good Life" on YouTube

"Good Life" is a song by American pop rock band OneRepublic, taken from their second studio album, Waking Up (2009). The song was written by group members Ryan Tedder, Brent Kutzle, and Eddie Fisher along with group associate Noel Zancanella. It was produced by Tedder, with co-production by Kutzle and Zancanella.

The song was released on November 19, 2010, as the album's third single in the United States, and as its overall fourth single. Its popularity was increased by its use in various films, television series and advertisements. The single was a commercial success, peaking at number 8 on the US Billboard Hot 100 and eventually being certified six-times platinum, as well as reaching the top twenty of other music charts across Europe, Australia, and New Zealand. The song has sold over 3 million copies in the US as of January 2014.

Critical reception of "Good Life" was generally positive. This song is unique in that the band recorded various radio versions of this song for different cities and states. The line changed in the lyrics is "my friends in [city/state] they don't know, where I've been."

A remix of the song, featuring American rapper B.o.B, was released to radio stations in June 2011.

== Promotion ==
Initially released as a single in November 2010, the song's popularity was increased after its use in various media. Google used the song in its 2010 Zeitgeist "year in review" video. The song is featured in the trailers for the films Eat Pray Love and One Day, in the film Easy A, and in the television series One Tree Hill, Cougar Town, Gossip Girl, Rookie Blue, America's Got Talent and 90210. The group performed the song at the 2011 Teen Choice Awards, 2011 Billboard Music Awards, American Music Awards of 2011, Live with Regis and Kelly, Dancing with the Stars, the 2011 Disney Parks Christmas Day Parade, and at the MTV Music Evolution Manila 2016. The background music of this song was played on various Walt Disney World television and radio commercials. In August 2012, "Good Life" was featured in a Honda Summer Clearance Event commercial.

== Critical reception ==
Giving the song five stars, About.com wrote, "Not only does "Good Life" have lyrics that anyone can relate to — "... what the hell is there to complain about ..." — it also has a unique musical delivery that allows the song to stand out on a radio full of same-sounding songs." Rolling Stone put the song on its list of the 15 Best Whistling Songs of All Time.

== Music video ==
The music video for "Good Life" was premiered on February 14, 2011. The video shows the band performing the song in a field, processed to look like an old film using the stop motion principle. Most of the scenes are processed to look like stop motion. It shows many different symbols and is a bit different from their previous videos. The original video was filmed in a mountain valley located in West Hills, California. It features cameo appearances by Cate Blanchett, Anne Hathaway, Nicolas Cage, Russell Crowe, and many more. The music video currently has over 200 million views.

In December 2011, a second music video, filmed entirely at Magic Kingdom in Walt Disney World was released. It features the band performing at Cinderella Castle, as well as riding on several attractions.

== Track listing ==
- CD single Digital download
1. "Good Life" (new mix version) – 4:05
2. "Good Life" (Demolition Crew remix) – 4:12
- Digital download — remix
1. "Good Life" (featuring B.o.B) – 3:50

== Charts ==
=== Weekly charts ===
Chart (2010–2012)	Peak position
Australia (ARIA)	62
Austria (Ö3 Austria Top 40)	9
Canada Hot 100 (Billboard)	5
Canada AC (Billboard)	5
Canada CHR/Top 40 (Billboard)	17
Canada Hot AC (Billboard)	3
Denmark (Tracklisten)	19
Germany (GfK)	19
Germany (Airplay Chart)	1
Ireland (IRMA)	41
Italy (FIMI)	47
Luxembourg Digital Songs (Billboard)	8
Netherlands (Dutch Top 40)	25
New Zealand (Recorded Music NZ)	22
Sweden (Sverigetopplistan)	41
Switzerland (Schweizer Hitparade)	14
US Billboard Hot 100	8
US Adult Contemporary (Billboard)	2
US Adult Pop Airplay (Billboard)	1
US Hot Latin Songs (Billboard)	48
US Pop Airplay (Billboard)	6

=== Year-end charts ===
Chart (2011)	Position
Austria (Ö3 Austria Top 40)	71
Canada (Canadian Hot 100)	36
US Billboard Hot 100	25
US Adult Contemporary (Billboard)	18
US Adult Top 40 (Billboard)	2
US Mainstream Top 40 (Billboard)	25

Chart (2012)	Position
US Adult Contemporary (Billboard)	7

Chart (2013)	Position
Slovenia (SloTop50)	46

== Certifications ==
Region	Certification	Certified units/sales
Australia (ARIA) B.o.B remix	2× Platinum	140,000^{‡}
Austria (IFPI Austria)	Platinum	30,000^{*}
Brazil (Pro-Música Brasil)	Gold	30,000^{‡}
Denmark (IFPI Danmark)	Platinum	90,000^{‡}
Germany (BVMI)	Gold	150,000^{‡}
Italy (FIMI)	Gold	25,000^{‡}
New Zealand (RMNZ)	2× Platinum	60,000^{‡}
United Kingdom (BPI)	Silver	200,000^{‡}
United States (RIAA)	6× Platinum	3,309,000
Streaming
Denmark (IFPI Danmark)	Gold	900,000^{†}
^{*} Sales figures based on certification alone.^{‡} Sales+streaming figures based on certification alone.^{†} Streaming-only figures based on certification alone.

== Release history ==
Country	Date	Format	Version
Germany	January 21, 2011	CD single	Original
United States	May 3, 2011	Contemporary hit radio	Original
United States	June 21, 2011	Digital download	Remix
Italy	July 15, 2011	Radio impact	Remix
