= OneRepublic discography =

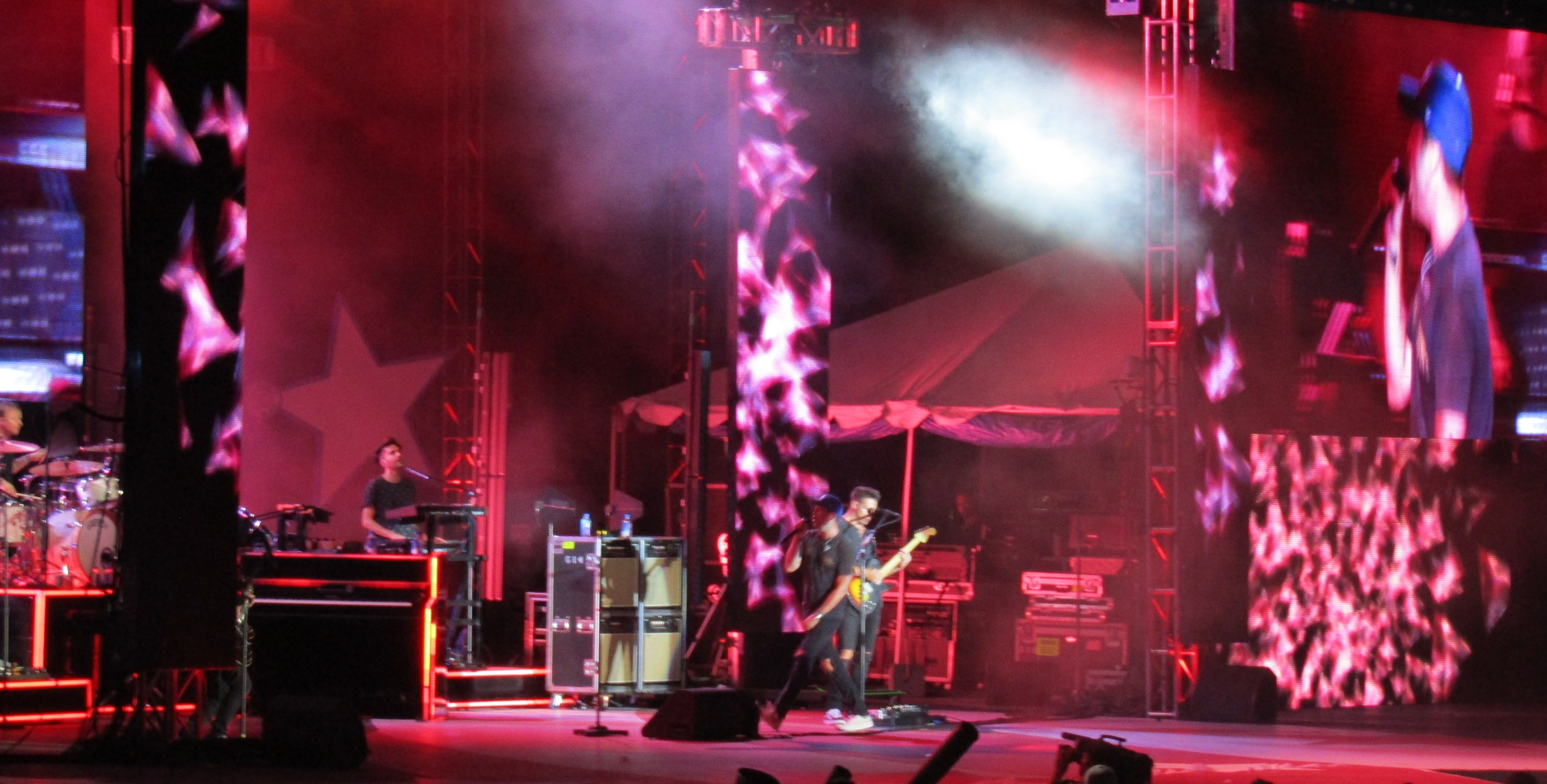
- OneRepublic performing at the Stadium of Fire
- Studio albums: 6
- Extended plays: 12
- Live albums: 1
- Compilation albums: 2
- Singles: 52
- Promotional singles: 10
- Music videos: 38

American pop rock band OneRepublic has released six studio albums, one live album, two compilation albums, twelve extended plays, 52 singles, ten promotional singles, and 38 music videos. Formed in 2002, OneRepublic first found commercial recognition when their song "Apologize" was released onto Myspace in 2006 and they subsequently became the biggest act on that site. It was remixed by American record producer Timbaland, appearing on his album Shock Value. Released as a single in 2007, the song topped the charts in multiple countries, including Australia and Canada, while also reaching the top three in the United States and the United Kingdom. It has since sold over 5.8 million digital downloads in the United States. The band's debut studio album, Dreaming Out Loud, was released in November 2007. It hit the top ten on the albums charts of countries such as Australia, Canada and the United Kingdom. It also peaked at number 14 on the US Billboard 200, earning a triple Platinum certification from the Recording Industry Association of America (RIAA). The album's second single, "Stop and Stare", peaked at number 12 on the US Billboard Hot 100 while also reaching the top five in Austria and the United Kingdom. The album spawned three more singles: "Say (All I Need)", "Mercy", and "Come Home".

Waking Up, the band's second studio album, was released in November 2009. It peaked at number 46 on the Billboard 200, earning a double Platinum certification from the RIAA. The album's lead single, "All the Right Moves", became a top ten hit in multiple countries, including Ireland and Switzerland. It also peaked at number 18 on the Billboard Hot 100. "Secrets", the album's second single, peaked at number 21 on the Hot 100. "Marchin On" was released as the album's third single in Europe, becoming a top ten hit in Austria and Germany. "Good Life", the album's fourth single, became the band's second top ten hit on the Billboard Hot 100, where it peaked at number 8. It also peaked at number 5 on the Canadian Hot 100.

Native, the band's third album, was released in March 2013. The album peaked at number 4 on the Billboard 200, earning a four-times Platinum and becoming the band's highest-charting album to date. The album contains the Diamond-certified worldwide hit "Counting Stars", which topped the charts in Canada and the United Kingdom and reached number 2 in the United States and several other countries, as well as the moderately successful singles "Feel Again", "Something I Need" and "If I Lose Myself". In 2014, there was a reissue of that album, which contained a new single, "Love Runs Out", which peaked at number 15 on the Billboard Hot 100 chart, included a dance remix of the song "If I Lose Myself" by Alesso.

Oh My My, OneRepublic's fourth album, was released on October 7, 2016. The first single from the album, "Wherever I Go", reached number 55 on the Billboard Hot 100. The second single, "Kids", reached number 96 on the Hot 100. The band released their fifth album, Human, on August 27, 2021.

== Albums ==
=== Studio albums ===
List of studio albums, with selected chart positions and certifications
Title	Album details	Peak chart positions										Certifications
Title	Album details	US	AUS	AUT	CAN	GER	IRL	NLD	NZ	SWI	UK	Certifications
Dreaming Out Loud	Released: November 20, 2007; Label: Interscope, Mosley; Formats: CD, LP, digital download, streaming	14	4	14	7	7	4	71	3	8	2	RIAA: 3× Platinum; ARIA: Gold; BPI: Platinum; BVMI: Platinum; IFPI AUT: Platinum; IFPI SWI: Gold; MC: Gold; RMNZ: 2× Platinum
Waking Up	Released: November 13, 2009; Label: Interscope, Mosley; Formats: CD, LP, digital download, streaming	21	—	28	27	19	29	88	—	14	29	RIAA: 2× Platinum; BPI: Silver; BVMI: Platinum; IFPI AUT: Platinum; RMNZ: Platinum
Native	Released: March 26, 2013; Label: Interscope, Mosley; Formats: CD, LP, digital download, streaming	4	8	5	12	4	15	24	12	4	9	RIAA: 4× Platinum; ARIA: Platinum; BPI: Platinum; BVMI: Platinum; IFPI AUT: Platinum; IFPI SWI: Platinum; MC: 3× Platinum; RMNZ: 4× Platinum
Oh My My	Released: October 7, 2016; Label: Interscope, Mosley; Formats: CD, LP, digital download, streaming	3	8	8	4	6	5	14	5	3	6	RIAA: Gold; BPI: Silver; RMNZ: Gold
Human	Released: August 27, 2021; Label: Interscope, Mosley; Formats: CD, LP, digital download, streaming	11	10	7	12	8	83	20	14	3	30	RIAA: Gold; IFPI SWI: Platinum; RMNZ: Gold
Artificial Paradise	Released: July 12, 2024; Label: Interscope, Mosley; Formats: CD, LP, digital download, streaming	50	61	8	24	23	90	—	25	8	46	RIAA: Gold; BPI: Silver; MC: 2× Platinum; RMNZ: Gold
"—" denotes a recording that did not chart or was not released in that territory.

=== Live albums ===
List of live albums
Title	Album details
One Night in Malibu	Released: February 4, 2022; Label: Interscope, Mosley; Formats: CD, LP, digital download, streaming

=== Compilation albums ===
List of compilation albums, with selected chart positions and certifications
Title	Album details	Peak chart positions								Certifications
Title	Album details	US	AUS	AUT	CAN	GER	IRL	NZ	UK	Certifications
OneRepublic (Japan Paradise Tour Edition)	Released: February 15, 2023 (Note: OneRepublic (Japan Paradise Tour Edition) was only released in Japan.); Label: Interscope, Mosley; Formats: CD, digital download, streaming	—	—	—	—	—	—	—	—	
The Collection	Released: August 15, 2025; Label: Interscope, Mosley; Formats: CD, LP, digital download, streaming	46	32	52	29	39	20	10	29	BPI: Gold; RMNZ: Gold
"—" denotes a recording that did not chart or was not released in that territory.

== Extended plays ==
List of extended plays, with certifications
Title	EP details	Certifications
Hit 3 Pack: Stop and Stare – Video EP (The Stripped Sessions)	Released: February 19, 2008; Label: Interscope; Formats: Digital download, streaming	
Live Session (iTunes Exclusive)	Released: October 28, 2008; Label: Interscope, Mosley; Formats: Digital download	
All the Right Moves (Remixes)	Released: January 1, 2010; Label: Interscope, Mosley; Formats: Digital download, streaming	
Live from Zurich	Released: October 5, 2010; Label: Interscope, Mosley; Formats: Digital download, streaming	
Live from Dortmund	Released: July 6, 2011; Label: Interscope, Mosley; Formats: Digital download	
Love Runs Out (Remixes)	Released: July 29, 2014; Label: Interscope, Mosley; Formats: Digital download, streaming	
I Lived (Remixes)	Released: October 7, 2014; Label: Interscope; Formats: Digital download, streaming	
Sunshine. The EP	Released: December 31, 2021; Label: Interscope, Mosley; Formats: Digital download, streaming	ARIA: Platinum
I Ain't Worried (Versions)	Released: May 12, 2023; Label: Interscope, Mosley; Formats: Digital download, streaming	
Beautiful Colors EP	Released: September 26, 2025; Label: BMG; Formats: Digital download, streaming	
Nobody EP	Released: October 3, 2025; Label: Interscope, Mosley; Formats: Digital download, streaming	
Invincible EP	Released: October 10, 2025; Label: Universal; Formats: Digital download, streaming	

== Singles ==
=== As lead artist ===
List of singles as lead artist, with selected chart positions and certifications, showing year released and album name
Title	Year	Peak chart positions										Certifications	Album
Title	Year	US	AUS	AUT	CAN	GER	IRL	NLD	NZ	SWI	UK	Certifications	Album
"Sleep"	2006	—	—	—	—	—	—	—	—	—	—		OneRepublic (Cancelled)
"Apologize" (solo or with Timbaland)	2006	2	1	1	1	1	2	1	1	1	3	RIAA: 5× Platinum; ARIA: 11× Platinum; BPI: 3× Platinum; BVMI: 9× Gold; IFPI AUT: 2× Platinum; IFPI SWI: 3× Platinum; MC: Platinum; RMNZ: 4× Platinum	Dreaming Out Loud
"Stop and Stare"	2007	12	11	4	4	6	3	12	15	5	4	RIAA: 4× Platinum; ARIA: 2× Platinum; BVMI: Gold; RMNZ: Platinum	Dreaming Out Loud
"Say (All I Need)"	2008	— (Note: "Say (All I Need)" did not enter the Billboard Hot 100, but peaked at number 6 on the Bubbling Under Hot 100 Singles chart, which acts as an extension to the Hot 100.)	—	—	75	41	48	32	—	—	51	RIAA: Platinum	Dreaming Out Loud
"Mercy"	2008	—	—	—	—	—	—	54	—	—	—		Dreaming Out Loud
"Come Home" (with Sara Bareilles)	2009	80	—	—	—	—	—	—	—	—	—	RIAA: Platinum	Dreaming Out Loud
"All the Right Moves"	2009	18	—	9	27	14	5	14	8	2	26	RIAA: 4× Platinum; ARIA: Gold; BVMI: Gold; IFPI AUT: Gold; IFPI SWI: Gold; MC: Platinum; RMNZ: Gold	Waking Up
"Secrets"	2009	21	93	4	32	3	—	15	27	19	77	RIAA: 7× Platinum; ARIA: 2× Platinum; BPI: Gold; BVMI: 3× Gold; IFPI AUT: Platinum; RMNZ: 2× Platinum	Waking Up
"Marchin On"	2010	—	—	7	—	6	—	—	23	37	—	BVMI: Gold; IFPI AUT: Gold	Waking Up
"Good Life"	2010	8	62	9	5	19	25	25	22	14	—	RIAA: 6× Platinum; ARIA: 2× Platinum; BPI: Silver; BVMI: Gold; IFPI AUT: Platinum; RMNZ: 2× Platinum	Waking Up
"Feel Again"	2012	36	—	19	59	9	—	—	—	34	—	RIAA: 2× Platinum; ARIA: Gold	Native
"If I Lose Myself"	2013	—	—	—	—	—	14	—	—	—	8	ARIA: 3× Platinum; GLF: 4× Platinum; RMNZ: 2× Platinum	Native
"Counting Stars"	2013	2	2	4	1	3	2	3	2	9	1	RIAA: 18× Platinum; ARIA: 21× Platinum; BPI: 7× Platinum; BVMI: Diamond; IFPI AUT: 4× Platinum; IFPI SWI: Platinum; MC: Diamond; RMNZ: 9× Platinum	Native
"Something I Need"	2013	—	6	5	—	74	—	—	4	21	78	RIAA: Gold; ARIA: 5× Platinum; RMNZ: 2× Platinum	Native
"If I Lose Myself" (Note: "If I Lose Myself" also features on Alesso's debut studio album Forever.) (vs. Alesso)	2014	74	14	5	41	6	—	—	16	9	—	RIAA: 3× Platinum; ARIA: Platinum; BPI: Platinum; BVMI: 3× Gold; IFPI AUT: Platinum; IFPI SWI: Gold; MC: Gold; RMNZ: Gold	Native
"Love Runs Out"	2014	15	22	3	4	3	14	29	20	3	3	RIAA: 3× Platinum; ARIA: 2× Platinum; BPI: Platinum; BVMI: Platinum; IFPI AUT: Platinum; IFPI SWI: Platinum; MC: Platinum; RMNZ: Platinum	Native
"I Lived"	2014	32	86	48	29	61	—	—	35	—	29	RIAA: 4× Platinum; ARIA: 2× Platinum; BPI: Platinum; BVMI: Gold; RMNZ: 3× Platinum	Native
"Wherever I Go"	2016	55	32	29	38	33	39	28	34	29	29	RIAA: Platinum; ARIA: Platinum; BPI: Gold; BVMI: Gold; IFPI AUT: Gold; MC: Gold; RMNZ: Platinum	Oh My My
"Kids"	2016	96	63	55	—	71	66	—	— (Note: "Kids" did not enter the NZ Top 40 Singles Chart, but peaked at number 1 on the NZ Heatseeker Singles Chart.)	45	58	RIAA: Platinum; ARIA: Gold; BPI: Silver; RMNZ: Gold	Oh My My
"Let's Hurt Tonight"	2016	—	—	61	—	98	—	—	—	26	—	RIAA: Gold	Oh My My
"No Vacancy"	2017	— (Note: "No Vacancy" did not enter the Billboard Hot 100, but peaked at number 13 on the Bubbling Under Hot 100 Singles chart, which acts as an extension to the Hot 100.)	—	61	74	52	74	—	—	34	—	BVMI: Gold	Non-album singles
"Rich Love" (with Seeb)	2017	— (Note: "Rich Love" did not enter the Billboard Hot 100, but peaked at number 14 on the Bubbling Under Hot 100 Singles chart, which acts as an extension to the Hot 100.)	97	58	80	64	40	—	—	33	84	RIAA: Gold; ARIA: Gold; BPI: Silver; BVMI: Gold; MC: Gold; RMNZ: Goldm	Non-album singles
"Start Again" (featuring Logic)	2018	—	67	72	94	87	52	—	— (Note: "Start Again" did not enter the NZ Top 40 Singles Chart, but peaked at number 10 on the NZ Heatseeker Singles Chart.)	53	—	RIAA: Gold; ARIA: Gold	13 Reasons Why: Season 2
"Connection"	2018	— (Note: "Connection" did not enter the Billboard Hot 100, but peaked at number 21 on the Bubbling Under Hot 100 Singles chart, which acts as an extension to the Hot 100.)	116	—	—	—	84	—	—	92	—	RIAA: Platinum; ARIA: Gold; RMNZ: Gold	Non-album single
"Rescue Me"	2019	— (Note: "Rescue Me" did not enter the Billboard Hot 100, but peaked at number 5 on the Bubbling Under Hot 100 chart, which acts as an extension to the Hot 100.)	26	17	58	24	23	71	22	21	52	RIAA: Platinum; ARIA: 3× Platinum; BPI: Silver; BVMI: Gold; IFPI AUT: 2× Platinum; MC: Gold; RMNZ: 2× Platinum	Human (Note: "Lose Somebody" and "Wild Life" appear on the deluxe edition of Human.)
"Wanted"	2019	— (Note: "Wanted" did not enter the Billboard Hot 100, but peaked at number 9 on the Bubbling Under Hot 100 chart, which acts as an extension to the Hot 100.)	78	—	—	—	75	—	— (Note: "Wanted" did not enter the NZ Top 40 Singles Chart, but peaked at number 17 on the NZ Hot Singles Chart.)	37	— (Note: "Wanted" did not enter the Official UK Top 40, but peaked at number 99 on the UK Download Chart.)	RIAA: Gold; ARIA: Gold; RMNZ: Gold	Human
"Didn't I"	2020	— (Note: "Didn't I" did not enter the Billboard Hot 100, but peaked at number 19 on the Bubbling Under Hot 100 chart, which acts as an extension to the Hot 100.)	—	66	—	—	—	— (Note: "Didn't I" did not enter the Single Top 100, but reached number 28 on its extension, Single Tip.)	— (Note: "Didn't I" did not enter the NZ Top 40 Singles Chart, but peaked at number 14 on the NZ Hot Singles Chart.)	38	—	RIAA: Gold; ARIA: Gold	Human
"Better Days"	2020	— (Note: "Better Days" did not enter the Billboard Hot 100, but peaked at number 11 on the Digital Song Sales chart.)	—	—	—	—	—	—	— (Note: "Better Days" did not enter the NZ Top 40 Singles Chart, but peaked at number 29 on the NZ Hot Singles Chart.)	53	—	RIAA: Gold; ARIA: Gold; RMNZ: Gold	Human
"Lose Somebody" (Note: "Lose Somebody" also features on Kygo's third studio album, Golden Hour.) (with Kygo)	2020	88	31	28	45	45	35	33	— (Note: "Lose Somebody" did not enter the NZ Top 40 Singles Chart, but peaked at number two on the NZ Hot Singles Chart.)	20	46	RIAA: Platinum; ARIA: Platinum; BPI: Gold; IFPI AUT: Platinum; IFPI SWI: Gold; MC: Platinum; RMNZ: Platinum	Human
"Wild Life" (Note: "Wild Life" also features on the soundtrack of the 2020 film, Clouds.)	2020	— (Note: "Wild Life" did not enter the Billboard Hot 100, but peaked at number 49 on the Digital Song Sales chart.)	—	—	—	—	—	—	—	—	—		Human
"Run"	2021	— (Note: "Run" did not enter the Billboard Hot 100, but peaked at number 11 on the Bubbling Under Hot 100 chart, which acts as an extension to the Hot 100.)	56	29	56	19	40	21	— (Note: "Run" did not enter the NZ Top 40 Singles Chart, but peaked at number 10 on the NZ Hot Singles Chart.)	15	90	RIAA: Platinum; ARIA: 2× Platinum; BPI: Gold; BVMI: Gold; MC: 3× Platinum; IFPI AUT: Platinum; RMNZ: 2× Platinum	Human
"Someday"	2021	— (Note: "Someday" did not enter the Billboard Hot 100, but peaked at number 28 on the Adult Contemporary chart.)	—	—	—	—	—	— (Note: "Someday" did not enter the Single Top 100, but reached number 12 on its extension, the Single Tip.)	— (Note: "Someday" did not enter the NZ Top 40 Singles Chart, but peaked at number 13 on the NZ Hot Singles Chart.)	78	—	RIAA: Gold; ARIA: Gold; RMNZ: Gold	Human
"Sunshine"	2021	—	—	36	—	63	—	29	— (Note: "Sunshine" did not enter the NZ Top 40 Singles Chart, but peaked at number 32 on the NZ Hot Singles Chart.)	14	—	RIAA: Platinum; BPI: Gold; BVMI: Gold; IFPI AUT: Platinum; IFPI SWI: Platinum; MC: 2× Platinum; RMNZ: Platinum	Artificial Paradise
"West Coast"	2022	— (Note: "West Coast" did not enter the Billboard Hot 100, but peaked at number 18 on the Adult Pop Airplay chart.)	—	—	—	—	—	— (Note: "West Coast" did not enter the Single Top 100, but reached number 23 on its extension, the Single Tip.)	— (Note: "West Coast" did not enter the NZ Top 40 Singles Chart, but peaked at number six on the NZ Hot Singles Chart.)	65	—	RIAA: Gold; IFPI AUT: Gold; IFPI SWI: Gold; MC: Gold; RMNZ: Gold	Artificial Paradise
"You Were Loved" (with Gryffin)	2022	—	—	—	—	—	—	—	— (Note: "You Were Loved" did not enter the NZ Top 40 Singles Chart, but peaked at number 24 on the NZ Hot Singles Chart.)	—	—		Alive
"I Ain't Worried" (Note: "I Ain't Worried" also features on the soundtrack of the 2022 film, Top Gun: Maverick.)	2022	6	2	10	3	19	4	6	1	6	3	RIAA: 5× Platinum; ARIA: 11× Platinum; BPI: 3× Platinum; BVMI: Gold; IFPI AUT: 3× Platinum; IFPI SWI: 2× Platinum; MC: 3× Platinum; RMNZ: 6× Platinum	Artificial Paradise
"Runaway"	2023	— (Note: "Runaway" did not enter the Billboard Hot 100, but peaked at number 49 on the Adult Contemporary chart.)	—	—	—	—	—	26	— (Note: "Runaway" did not enter the NZ Top 40 Singles Chart, but peaked at number six on the NZ Hot Singles Chart.)	—	—		Artificial Paradise
"Mirage" (Note: "Mirage" also features on the soundtrack of the 2023 game, Assassin's Creed Mirage.) (with Mishaal Tamer)	2023	—	—	—	—	—	—	—	— (Note: "Mirage" did not enter the NZ Top 40 Singles Chart, but peaked at number 31 on the NZ Hot Singles Chart.)	—	—		Artificial Paradise
"Dear Santa"	2023	— (Note: "Dear Santa" did not enter the Billboard Hot 100, but peaked at number 6 on the Bubbling Under Hot 100 Singles chart, which acts as an extension to the Hot 100.)	—	56	72	42	—	78	— (Note: "Dear Santa" did not enter the NZ Top 40 Singles Chart, but peaked at number 24 on the NZ Hot Singles Chart.)	80	—		Non-album single
"I Don't Wanna Wait" (with David Guetta)	2024	96	57	8	27	10	18	12	— (Note: "I Don't Wanna Wait" did not enter the NZ Top 40 Singles Chart, but peaked at number 10 on the NZ Hot Singles Chart.)	7	19	ARIA: Platinum; BPI: Platinum; MC: Platinum; IFPI SWI: Gold; RMNZ: Platinum	Artificial Paradise (Note: "I Don't Wanna Wait", "Nobody" and "Fire" appear on the deluxe edition of Artificial Paradise.)
"Nobody" (Note: "Nobody" also features on the soundtrack of the anime series, Kaiju No. 8.)	2024	—	—	—	—	—	—	—	— (Note: "Nobody" did not enter the NZ Top 40 Singles Chart, but peaked at number 27 on the NZ Hot Singles Chart.)	—	—		Artificial Paradise
"Fire (Official UEFA Euro 2024 Song)" (with Meduza and Leony)	2024	—	—	49	—	29	—	68	—	68	—		Artificial Paradise
"Hurt" (solo or with Jelly Roll)	2024	—	—	—	—	—	—	—	— (Note: "Hurt" did not enter the NZ Top 40 Singles Chart, but peaked at number 21 on the NZ Hot Singles Chart.)	—	—		Artificial Paradise
"Sink or Swim"	2024	— (Note: "Sink or Swim" did not enter the Billboard Hot 100, but peaked at number 26 on the Adult Contemporary chart.)	—	—	—	—	—	—	—	—	—		Artificial Paradise
"Chasing Paradise" (with Kygo)	2025	—	—	—	—	91	—	96	— (Note: "Chasing Paradise" did not enter the NZ Top 40 Singles Chart, but peaked at number 13 on the NZ Hot Singles Chart.)	76	—		Non-album singles
"Tell Me" (with Karan Aujla and Ikky)	2025	—	—	—	54	—	—	—	— (Note: "Tell Me" did not enter the NZ Top 40 Singles Chart, but peaked at number 13 on the NZ Hot Singles Chart.)	—	—		Non-album singles
"Invincible" (Note: "Invincible" also features on the soundtrack of the anime series, Kaiju No. 8.)	2025	—	—	—	—	—	—	—	— (Note: "Invincible" did not enter the NZ Top 40 Singles Chart, but peaked at number 20 on the NZ Hot Singles Chart.)	—	—		Non-album singles
"Starlight (The Fame)" (with The Supermen Lovers)	2025	—	—	—	—	—	—	—	—	—	—		Non-album singles
"Beautiful Colors" (Note: "Beautiful Colors" also features on the soundtrack of the anime series, Kaiju No. 8.)	2025	— (Note: "Runaway" did not enter the Billboard Hot 100, but peaked at number 49 on the Adult Pop Airplay chart.)	—	—	—	—	—	—	— (Note: "Beautiful Colors" did not enter the NZ Top 40 Singles Chart, but peaked at number 30 on the NZ Hot Singles Chart.)	—	—		TBA
"Give Me Something" (Note: "Give Me Something" also features on the soundtrack of the 2026 game, Arknights: Endfield.)	2025	—	—	—	—	—	—	—	—	—	—		TBA
"Need Your Love"	2026	— (Note: "Need Your Love" did not enter the Billboard Hot 100, but peaked at number 1 on the Bubbling Under Hot 100 chart, which acts as an extension to the Hot 100.)	—	—	—	—	—	—	— (Note: "Need Your Love" did not enter the NZ Top 40 Singles Chart, but peaked at number 11 on the NZ Hot Singles Chart.)	—	—		TBA
"In Your Eyes" (with Alesso)	2026	— (Note: "In Your Eyes" did not enter the Billboard Hot 100, but peaked at number 23 on the Hot Dance/Electronic Songs chart.)	—	—	—	—	—	— (Note: "In Your Eyes" did not enter the Dutch Single Top 100, but peaked at number 34 on the Dutch Airplay Top 50 chart.)	— (Note: "In Your Eyes" did not enter the NZ Top 40 Singles Chart, but peaked at number 39 on the NZ Hot Singles Chart.)	—	—		TBA
"Pay That Toll"	2026	—	—	—	—	—	—	—	— (Note: "Pay That Toll" did not enter the NZ Top 40 Singles Chart, but peaked at number 25 on the NZ Hot 40 Singles Chart.)	—	—		TBA
"Tsunami" (with Sofi Tukker)	2026	—	—	—	—	—	—	—	—	—	—		TBA
"—" denotes a single that did not chart or was not released in that territory.

=== As featured artist ===
List of singles as featured artist, with selected chart positions, showing year released and album name
Title	Year	Peak chart positions				Album
Title	Year	US Dance	IRL	SWE	SWI	Album
"Stranger Things" (Kygo featuring OneRepublic)	2018	13	92	56	48	Kids in Love
"Bones" (Galantis featuring OneRepublic)	2019	17	54	49	63	Church

=== Promotional singles ===
List of promotional singles, with selected chart positions, showing year released and album name
Title	Year	Peak chart positions				Certifications	Album
Title	Year	US Bub	AUS	CAN	NZ	Certifications	Album
"Everybody Loves Me"	2009	5	—	61	—	RIAA: Gold	Waking Up
"What You Wanted"	2013	—	—	—	—		Native
"Future Looks Good"	2016	—	90	—	— (Note: "Future Looks Good" did not enter the NZ Top 40 Singles Chart, but peaked at number 4 on the NZ Heatseekers Singles Chart.)		Oh My My
"A.I." (featuring Peter Gabriel)	2016	—	—	—	—		Oh My My
"Lift Me Up" (original or Michaël Brun remix)	2017	—	—	—	—		Oh My My
"Truth to Power"	2017	—	—	—	—		An Inconvenient Sequel: Truth to Power (Music from the Motion Picture)
"Champagne Supernova" (Oasis cover)	2017	—	—	—	—		Non-album promotional singles
"Born to Race" (Note: "Born to Race" was only released in certain Asian countries)	2017	—	—	—	—		Non-album promotional singles
"White Christmas"	2018	—	—	—	—		Non-album promotional singles
"Somebody to Love"	2019	6	—	—	— (Note: "Somebody to Love" did not enter the NZ Top 40 Singles Chart, but peaked at number 16 on the NZ Hot Singles Chart.)		Human
"—" denotes a single that did not chart or was not released in that territory.

== Other charted songs ==
List of songs, with selected chart positions, showing year released and album name
Title	Year	Peak chart positions		Album
Title	Year	AUT	GER	Album
"Christmas Without You"	2011	74	—	Non-album single
"Burning Bridges"	2014	—	96	Native
"—" denotes a song that did not chart or was not released in that territory.

== Guest appearances ==
List of non-single guest appearances, with other performing artists, showing year released and album name
Title	Year	Other artist(s)	Album
"Lost Then Found"	2009	Leona Lewis	Echo
"Marchin On" (Timbo Version)	2009	Timbaland	Shock Value II
"Ordinary Human"	2014	The Giver	The Giver (Original Motion Picture Soundtrack)

== Music videos ==
List of music videos, showing year released and directors
Title	Year	Director(s)	Album
"Sleep"	2005	Steven Oritt	OneRepublic (Cancelled)
"Mercy"	2005	Steven Oritt	OneRepublic (Cancelled)
"Apologize"	2005	Steven Oritt	OneRepublic (Cancelled) and Dreaming Out Loud
"Apologize (Remix)"	2007	Robert Hales	Dreaming Out Loud
"Stop and Stare"	2008	Anthony Mandler	Dreaming Out Loud
"Say (All I Need)"	2008	Anthony Mandler	Dreaming Out Loud
"Mercy"	2008	Chris Sims	Dreaming Out Loud
"All the Right Moves"	2009	Wayne Isham	Waking Up
"Secrets"	2010	Chris Sims	Waking Up
"Marchin On" (Remix)	2010	Chris Sims	Waking Up and Shock Value II
"Good Life"	2011	Ethan Lader	Waking Up
"Feel Again"	2012	Tim Nackashi	Native
"If I Lose Myself"	2013	Michael Muller	Native
"If I Lose Myself" (Remix)	2013	Unknown	Native
"Counting Stars"	2013	James Lees	Native
"Something I Need"	2013	Cameron Duddy	Native
"Burning Bridges"	2013	Unknown	Native
"Love Runs Out"	2014	Sophie Muller	Native
"I Lived"	2014	Noble Jones	Native
"I Lived" (Arty Remix)	2014	Unknown	Non-album single
"Light It Up"	2015	Dustin Culp	Native
"Can't Stop"	2015	Emma Manley & Rebekah Chon	Native
"Can't Stop"	2015	Shannon Leskowitz	Native
"Can't Stop"	2015	Erin Offenhauser	Native
"Light It Up"	2015	Jordan Parvex	Native
"Au Revoir"	2015	Jordan Parvex	Native
"Wherever I Go"	2016	Joseph Kahn	Oh My My
"Kids"	2016	Hal Kirkland	Oh My My
"Let's Hurt Tonight"	2016	David Frankel	Oh My My
"Rich Love"	2017	Isaac Rentz	Non-album singles
"Born to Race"	2018	Joshua Lipton	Non-album singles
"Start Again"	2018	James Lees	Non-album singles
"Connection"	2018	Joe Pront	Non-album singles
"Rescue Me"	2019	Christian Lamb	Human
"Wanted"	2019	Christian Lamb	Human
"Didn't I"	2020	Christian Lamb	Human
"Better Days"	2020	Josh Ricks	Human
"Wild Life"	2020	Christian Lamb	Human
"Run"	2021	Tomás Whitmore	Human
"Someday"	2022	Miles Cable and Issac Rentz	Human
"West Coast"	2022	Tomás Whitmore	Artificial Paradise
"I Ain't Worried"	2022	Issac Rentz	Artificial Paradise
"Runaway"	2023	Tomás Whitmore	Artificial Paradise
"Mirage"	2023	Tomás Whitmore	Artificial Paradise
"Dear Santa"	2023	Mr. Oz	Non-album single
"I Don't Wanna Wait"	2024	Issac Rentz	Artificial Paradise
"Fire"	2024	Kevin Ferstl	Artificial Paradise
"Nobody"	2024	Toya Ooshima	Artificial Paradise
"Sink or Swim"	2024	Isaac Rentz	Artificial Paradise
"Hurt"	2024	Isaac Rentz	Artificial Paradise
"Singapore"	2024	Unknown	Artificial Paradise
"Hurt" (with Jelly Roll)	2024	Unknown	Artificial Paradise
"Invincible"	2025	Unknown	TBA
"Beautiful Colors"	2025	Isaac Rentz	TBA
"Give Me Something"	2025	Unknown	TBA
"Need Your Love"	2026	Unknown	TBA
"Pay That Toll"	2026	Unknown	TBA
