= Mellott =

Mellott is a surname. Notable people with the surname include:

- Arthur Johnson Mellott (1888–1957), American jurist
- Greg Mellott, American television writer and director
- Tommy Mellott (born 2001), American football wide receiver

== See also ==
- Mellott, Indiana, town
