= Behind the Water =

- Genre: Documentary
- Directed by: Doug Clevenger
- Starring: Fraser Kershaw
- Composer: Brent Kutzle
- Countries of origin: United States, Latin America
- Original languages: English, Spanish

Production
- Producers: Gray Frederickson; Greg Mellott
- Production locations: Latin America, United States
- Cinematography: Doug Clevenger; David Bradshaw
- Editor: Emily Gibney

Original release
- Network: CaribVision
- Release: April 23, 2016

Behind the Water is a 2016 Latin American televised drama-documentary based on the live interactions within the world water crisis. Fraser Kershaw stars in the film. The film captures live footage while combining fictional elements. The film embraces the power of family and the commitment to conflict for survival. The film is based on a true story.

== Filming ==
The footage within the film was collected over 2 years throughout Latin America. Lacking access to modern health care in the jungle stressed the film's production. Fraser Kershaw takes a camera crew through highly restricted areas to find the deeply personal tales of stories from locals of Latin America. Kershaw can be seen delivering clean water in rural restricted regions.

== Plot ==
The film is based in part on some fiction, which is based in three separate adventures in the mind of Kershaw. He is seen as multiple characters. The film weaves together the stirring true stories of individuals who have overcome devastating obstacles to find clean water. The film embraces the power of family, commitment and how a community can be radically divided because of survival.

== Music ==
The original score was composed by Brent Kutzle and Fraser Kershaw. Behind the Water's soundtrack was released on April 23, 2016. Caribbean's Cana News states, "The score is clever enough to enhance the visions into place which assimilates to the footage from beginning to end."

== Release ==
Behind the Water was released by CaribVision on television during Earth Day weekend throughout the Caribbean and Latin America. Kershaw brought the film to public universities in the United States.
