= Someday (OneRepublic song) =

2021 song by OneRepublic

Single by OneRepublic

from the album Human
- Released: August 27, 2021
- Genre: Pop • pop rock • dance-pop
- Length: 3:07
- Label: Interscope; Mosley
- Songwriters: Brent Kutzle; Steven Mudd; Tyler Spry; Ryan Tedder; Josh Varnadore
- Producers: Kutzle; Spry

OneRepublic singles chronology
| "Run" (2021) | "Someday" (2021) | "Sunshine" (2021) |

Music video
- "Somebody" on YouTube

"Someday" is a song by American band OneRepublic, released the sixth and final single from their fifth studio album Human through Mosley and Interscope Records on August 27, 2021, the same day as the album. An acoustic version of the song was added to the deluxe edition of the album.

== Music video ==
A music video for "Someday" premiered on August 27, 2021 and was directed by Miles Cable and Issac Rentz. The video features the band members relaxing and performing on a boat in the afternoon and near various places at the location of their live album One Night in Malibu (2022) at sunset and twilight.

== Track listing ==
- Digital download
1. "Someday" – 3:07
- Digital download – Acoustic
1. "Someday" (Acoustic) – 3:06

== Personnel ==
Credits for "Someday" adapted from Apple Music.

Musicians

- Ryan Tedder – composer, programming, lead vocals
- Zach Filkins – lead guitar
- Drew Brown – rhythm guitar
- Brent Kutzle – bass guitar, programming
- Eddie Fisher – drums

Additional musicians

- Loren Ferard – guitar
- Steven Mudd – composer, backing vocals
- John Nathaniel – backing vocals, programming
- Tyler Spry – guitar, programming
- Josh Varnadore – composer

Production

- Chris Gehringer – mastering
- Kutzle – production
- Nathaniel – production, mixing
- Rich & Rich – engineering
- Spry – production, engineering
- Matthew Tryba – engineering
- Matt Wolach – mixing

== Charts ==
Chart performance for "Someday"
| Chart (2021–2022) | Peak position |
|---|---|
| New Zealand Hot Singles (RMNZ) | 13 |
| San Marino (SMRRTV Top 50) | 16 |
| Switzerland (Schweizer Hitparade) | 78 |

== Certifications ==
Certifications for "Someday"
| Region | Certification | Certified units/sales |
|---|---|---|
| Australia (ARIA) | Gold | 35,000^{‡} |
| Brazil (Pro-Música Brasil) | Gold | 20,000^{‡} |
| New Zealand (RMNZ) | Gold | 15,000^{‡} |
| Poland (ZPAV) | Gold | 25,000^{‡} |
| United States (RIAA) | Gold | 500,000^{‡} |
^{‡} Sales+streaming figures based on certification alone.
