= Somebody to Love (OneRepublic song) =

2019 promotional single by OneRepublic

Promotional single by OneRepublic

from the album Human
- Released: September 11, 2019
- Length: 3:01
- Label: Mosley; Interscope
- Songwriters: Ryan Tedder; Brent Kutzle; Zach Filkins; JT Roach; Ester Dean; Shane McAnally; Kevin Fisher; Jintae Ko; Andrew Wells
- Producers: Tedder; Kutzle; McAnally; Andrew DeRoberts

Lyric video
- "Somebody to Love" Video on YouTube

"Somebody to Love" is a song by American pop rock band OneRepublic as the first and only promotional single for the band's fifth studio album Human. The song, along with its writer JT Roach, were chosen as the winner of Episode 11 of Season 1 of the competition show Songland on which lead singer Ryan Tedder and lead guitarist Zach Filkins represented OneRepublic as the guest artist. The song was released on September 11, 2019, the same day as the episode's air date.

== Background and composition ==
"Somebody to Love" was originally written by JT Roach with additions from band members Ryan Tedder, Brent Kutzle, and Zach Filkins, Songland judges Ester Dean and Shane McAnally, Kevin Fisher, Jintae Ko, and Andrew Wells. The lyrics were written after Roach saw an ex-girlfriend a new relationship. After Roach's first performance on Songland, he matched with McAnally for further development and production. Tedder and Filkins then chose the song over MADI's "Darkest Days", Tyler James Bellinger's "Giving You Up", and Brigetta's "Be Somebody". In a statement, Tedder described his reasoning for picking the song:

We chose "Somebody to Love" because it is a magical song. It is painful. It is a raw nerve. It feels timeless. I knew we were sitting on a hit.

— Ryan Tedder

The song was played live for the first time at the band's concert at Red Rocks Amphitheatre on August 27 and 28, 2019.

== Personnel ==
Musicians

- Ryan Tedder – lead vocals, programming, songwriting
- Zach Filkins – lead guitar, songwriting
- Drew Brown – bass guitar
- Brent Kutzle – bass guitar, programming, songwriting
- Eddie Fisher – drums

Additional musicians

- Daniel Adams – violin
- Brandon Collins – string arrangement
- David Davidson – violin
- Ester Dean – songwriting
- Andrew DeRoberts – programming, guitar, composition
- Kevin Fisher – songwriting
- Jintae Ko – composition, songwriting
- Shane McAnally – songwriting
- John Nathaniel – background vocals
- JT Roach – songwriting
- Tyler Spry – guitar
- Andrew Wells – composition, songwriting
- Steve Wilmot – programming

Production

- Tedder – production
- Kutzle – production
- DeRoberts – production
- McAnally – production
- Nathaniel – additional production, mixing
- Spry – additional production, engineering
- Rich Rich – engineering
- Carter Jahn – engineering
- Doug Sarrett – engineering
- Joe Zook – mixing

== Charts ==
Chart performance for "Somebody to Love"
| Chart (2019) | Peak position |
|---|---|
| New Zealand Hot Singles (RMNZ) | 16 |
| US Bubbling Under Hot 100 (Billboard) | 6 |
