= Gray Frederickson =

American film producer (1937–2022)

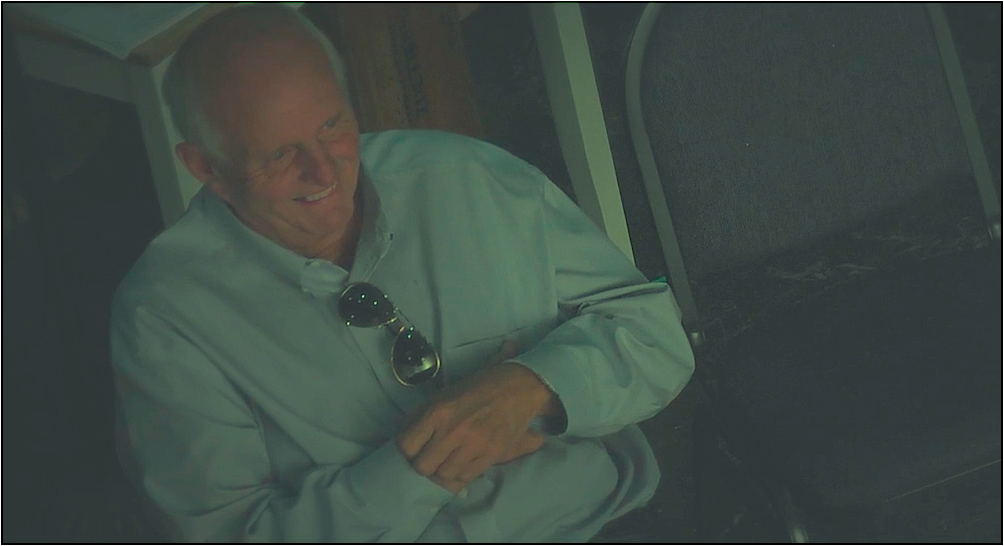
- Born: July 21, 1937; Oklahoma City, Oklahoma, U.S.
- Died: November 20, 2022 (aged 85); Oklahoma City, Oklahoma, U.S.
- Occupation: Producer
- Years active: 1963–2022

Gray Frederickson (July 21, 1937 – November 20, 2022) was an American film producer.

== Frequent collaborators and history ==
Frederickson was a long-time producer for Francis Ford Coppola and worked out of a studio alongside Greg Mellott out of Oklahoma City.

Robert De Niro claims that in 1974 he and Frederickson went up to the Gulf and Western Building in New York City to a private screening room to study Marlon Brando's movements. De Niro compared it to a science experiment which prepared him for his character in The Godfather Part II. Frederickson and Coppola collaborated on Apocalypse Now, One from the Heart, and The Outsiders. According to Rolling Stone, the first meeting between Frederickson, Coppola, and Al Ruddy was interrupted by a phone call from Brando.

== Awards ==
Frederickson is best known for winning an Oscar as one of the co-producers of The Godfather Part II at the 47th Academy Awards. In addition he was also nominated for Apocalypse Now. Frederickson won an Emmy for Dream No Little Dream: The Life and Legacy of Robert S. Kerr (2007).

== Later production ==
In the summer of 2015, Frederickson produced a new cinematic live theater art form called, 'Distant Vision' directed by Francis Ford Coppola.

== Personal life ==
Frederickson was married to Karen and resided in Oklahoma City, Oklahoma. He died of prostate cancer on November 20, 2022, at the age of 85.
