= Ryan Tedder =

American singer, songwriter, and producer (born 1979)

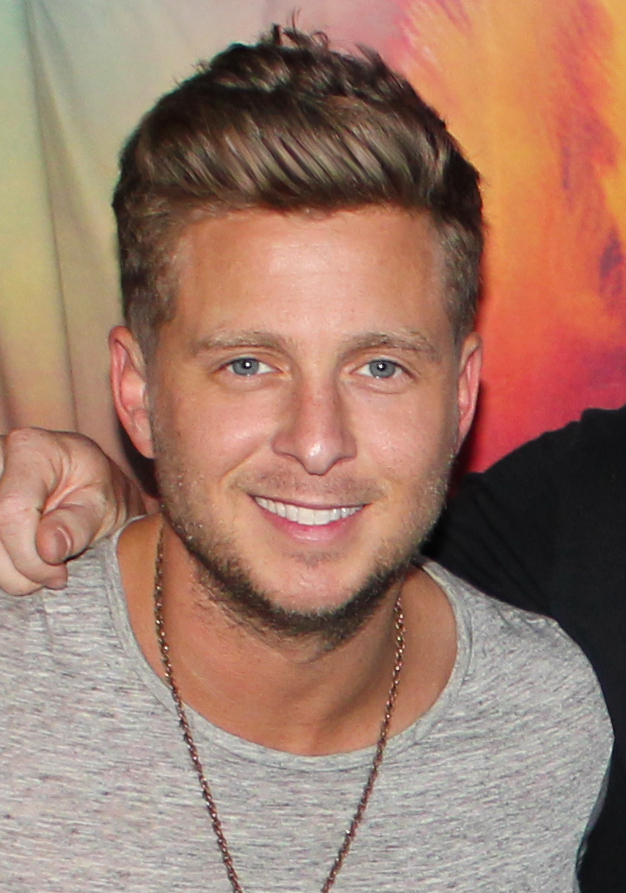
- Tedder in 2013

Background information
- Also known as: Alias
- Born: Ryan Benjamin Tedder; June 26, 1979 (age 47); Tulsa, Oklahoma, U.S.
- Origin: Colorado Springs, Colorado, U.S.
- Education: Oral Roberts University (BA)
- Genres: Rock; pop rock; pop; alternative rock
- Occupations: Singer; songwriter; multi-instrumentalist; record producer
- Instruments: Vocals; piano; keyboards; guitar; bass; drums
- Years active: 1996–present
- Member of: OneRepublic

Ryan Benjamin Tedder (born June 26, 1979) is an American singer, musician, songwriter, and record producer. He is the co-founder and frontman of the pop rock band OneRepublic, and has a concurrent career in production and songwriting for other artists.

Tedder's production and songwriting work has been proven commercially successful. "Apologize", performed by his band OneRepublic, "Bleeding Love", performed by Leona Lewis, and "Halo", performed by Beyoncé, were each produced by Tedder and remain among the best-selling singles of all time. In early 2014, Billboard named him "The Undercover King of Pop" and featured him on the magazine's cover. He is a three-time recipient of the Grammy Award for Album of the Year for his credits on Adele's 21 and 25, and Taylor Swift's 1989. The Recording Industry Association of America (RIAA) reported Tedder's productions have sold 450 million cumulative units worldwide. He also served as a co-producer for the 2019 reality competition series Songland.

== Early life and education ==
Ryan Benjamin Tedder was born to musician Gary Tedder and Marlene Watrous, a schoolteacher. He grew up in an extended family of missionaries and pastors in a Christian church in Tulsa, Oklahoma. He began learning to play the piano at the age of three via the Suzuki method. He practiced piano in exchange for candy corn from his father. His father would put the candy out of reach at first and then on a grand piano for him to eat. His mother knew nothing about secular music.

Ryan Tedder started singing at the age of seven. He was a self-taught vocalist who at twelve secretly began imitating his favorite artists including The Beatles, U2, Peter Gabriel, Stevie Wonder, and Sting. Tedder commented, "I sang for two hours a day every day of my life until I was eighteen." He continued to perform musically during his adolescence through church, school, and personally formed groups.

He attended schools in Jenks, Oklahoma, a suburb of Tulsa, and Deer Creek, Oklahoma north of Oklahoma City. Then he transferred to Colorado Springs Christian School in Colorado Springs for his senior year and graduated from there. There he met and became friends with future OneRepublic bandmate Zach Filkins on their soccer team at Colorado Springs Christian School. He attended Oral Roberts University in Tulsa and graduated in 2001 with a Bachelor of Arts degree in public relations and advertising.

== Career ==
=== Early career ===
Tedder worked as a waiter and a shop assistant at Pottery Barn before securing an internship at DreamWorks SKG in Nashville, Tennessee, where he sang on multiple demos. He produced demos for songwriters and labels, charging $300 to $400 a track. Tedder claims that DreamWorks offered him his first publishing deal shortly after his arrival; however, he was intent on pursuing a career as an artist, and his first venture in that arena came via a different route altogether.

At the age of twenty-one, Tedder competed in a singer-songwriter competition and was selected by NSYNC artist Lance Bass as one of five finalists to perform on a one-hour special on MTV, performing original material in front of millions of viewers. The prize for the winner was a music contract with Bass's now-defunct management company, Free Lance Entertainment. The contestants performed live and were then rated by the judges and by the audience, with the highest-scoring artist winning the contract. Tedder's performance of one of his songs, "The Look", received the most votes from the judges and fans, and he won the competition; however, a contract with a recording label was not finalized and no album was released. Tedder later revealed that the record and publishing deal he was offered "wasn't real. It was just a bunch of hype that didn't turn into anything".

=== Producing and writing ===
One year after winning the MTV competition, Tedder caught the attention of the hip hop producer Timbaland. Tedder commented that he was with Timbaland from 2002 to 2004 to develop as an artist while producing for other artists at the time. Tedder's work crossed many musical genres (ranging from hip hop, R&B, rock, pop to dance) and he has had chart successes in both America and the United Kingdom with some artists. Tedder met producer Morten Schjolin in 2005, doing various collaborations for Tattoo's second album. In June 2007, Tedder signed a worldwide publishing administration deal with Kobalt Music Publishing. The deal included Tedder's new works and all songs not performed by OneRepublic.

Tedder is the writer of the song "Apologize", performed with OneRepublic. The song broke the US Top 40 Radio Airplay Record with 10,331 plays in one week. It was the number-one most played song for five months until May 7, 2008, when Leona Lewis's "Bleeding Love", a song co-written and co-produced by Tedder, broke the record previously set by "Apologize", with 10,665 plays in one week. "Bleeding Love" was the best-selling single of 2007 in the United Kingdom, topping the UK charts for seven weeks. It was the fastest-selling CD of 2007 receiving the most radio airplay worldwide before its US debut. The song also earned a Best British Single award nomination at the Brit Awards in February 2008 and reached number one in over 35 countries. Tedder and co-writer Jesse McCartney received an ASCAP award for writing "Bleeding Love". Tedder is also credited for writing the treatment for the second music video that was filmed for the US release of "Bleeding Love". It also earned a Record of the Year nomination at the February 2009 Grammy Awards.

Tedder is one of the most prolific songwriters and producers of pop music in the 21st Century, having written and produced singles with artists including Taylor Swift, Ed Sheeran, Madonna, Sam Smith, Lady Gaga, Paul McCartney, Elton John, Ariana Grande, Shawn Mendes, Camila Cabello, Demi Lovato, Adele, Birdy, Alsou, Jennifer Lopez, Kelly Clarkson, Leona Lewis, Delta Goodrem, Ella Henderson, Ellie Goulding, Jennifer Hudson, Alexandra Burke, Miley Cyrus, Beyoncé, Monrose, P!nk, Gwen Stefani, John Legend, David Cook, Olly Murs, Blake Lewis, Adam Lambert, Jordin Sparks, Meghan Trainor, Charlie Puth, Julia Michaels, Bebe Rexha, Jessie J, Jessie Ware, Mikky Ekko, Charlotte Lawrence, D4vd, Nate Sib, and Rachel Platten; country artists including Carrie Underwood, Rascal Flatts, Thomas Rhett, Jelly Roll, Kelsea Ballerini, Florida Georgia Line, Old Dominion, Lady Antebellum, and Jon Pardi; groups including Jonas Brothers, One Direction, Boyz II Men, Backstreet Boys, Westlife, BTS, Tomorrow X Together, Blackpink, Katseye, LANY, the Wanted, Lukas Graham, and Foster the People; dance acts including Alesso, David Guetta, Tiesto, Kygo, and Illenium; and various rock acts in the U.S. and abroad, including Maroon 5, 5SOS, Gavin James, The Fray, The Script, The Killers, Bon Jovi, Ozzy Osbourne, Train, Machine Gun Kelly, Big Time Rush, and Rob Thomas.

He worked with Jennifer Lopez on her 2007 single "Do It Well" from her album Brave. He worked with Kelly Clarkson on her 2009 album All I Ever Wanted, penning the songs "If I Can't Have You", "Impossible", "Save You", "Tip of My Tongue" and "Already Gone", which features vocals from Tedder. Tedder's work with Beyoncé earned him two Grammy nominations with Record of the Year for co-writing the song "Halo" and Album of the Year for I Am... Sasha Fierce at the 2010 Grammy Awards. Tedder worked extensively on Leona Lewis's second album, Echo, writing and producing several songs with her, three of which made the album, including the first single "Happy", "You Don't Care" which features vocals from Tedder and "Lost Then Found", which features OneRepublic. Tedder co-wrote and produced the song "Battlefield" from Jordin Sparks' second album of the same name. Tedder worked on American Idol season 8 runner up Adam Lambert's debut album, For Your Entertainment.

In late 2009, Tedder launched his own record company, Patriot Records. He signed My Name Is Kay, who released her debut EP through Interscope in 2012. "City Lights" by Nikki Flores was released in the fall of 2010 by Universal/Republic Records. Tedder also formed his own publishing company, Patriot Games Publishing, in 2009 in alliance with Kobalt Music Publishing Worldwide. He has a team of writers and producers such as Info, Noel Zancanella, and Brent Kutzle, cellist/bassist of OneRepublic. The Patriot team of writers and producers with Tedder are credited with "I Was Here" by Beyoncé, "Good Life" by OneRepublic, "I Just Had Sex" by The Lonely Island featuring Akon, "Lost Then Found" by Leona Lewis and OneRepublic, "Just a Guy" by BC Jean, "Count on You" by Big Time Rush featuring Jordin Sparks, and "And Then We Dance", from Australia's Got Talent winners Justice Crew. In 2010, Tedder was featured on Far East Movement's 2010 hit single "Rocketeer".

Tedder had expressed interest in collaborating with Adele after they met at the 2009 Grammy Awards ceremony in February. He arrived four hours early to their first studio session. He composed the opening piano sequence and first few lines to what became the song "Turning Tables". Adele and Tedder arranged a second meeting and reconvened at Serenity West Studios in Los Angeles weeks later to write and record "Rumour Has It". In an interview, Tedder recalled his astonishment at the singer's musical and vocal prowess after she completed the main vocals to the song in 10 minutes: "She sang it top to bottom, pitch-perfect, she didn't miss a note. I looked at the engineer then at her and said, 'Adele, I don't know what to tell you but I have never had anyone do that in ten years." His work with Adele brought him a Grammy Award for Album of the Year at the 2012 Grammy Awards.

In 2011, Tedder worked with Demi Lovato for their third studio album, Unbroken. When talking about working with Tedder on the song "Who's That Boy" during a Spotify session named "About Unbroken", Lovato recalled: "He's a really funny and cool guy, we had a really great time in the studio." Lovato said that the track was "personally one of my favorite songs of the album." Furthermore, they added that they were "excited to say I worked with such a talented songwriter and producer." Tedder later said, "Demi blew me out of the water vocally! I had no idea how good her voice is. She's one of the best singers I've ever worked with. Literally, that is good. ... I mean, she's a Kelly Clarkson-level vocalist. And Kelly has a set of pipes." Tedder returned to work with Lovato in 2013 and 2015 for their fourth and fifth studio albums, respectively. He co-produced and co-wrote the single "Neon Lights" from Demi, while also penning the track "Wildfire" with Lovato for Confident.

Tedder composed a song for Vanness Wu, "Is this All" in Taiwan. Tedder also worked with the group Big Time Rush in writing the single, "Music Sounds Better with U" off their second studio album, Elevate, and he proceeded to produce it. He co-wrote David Cook's "The Last Goodbye" from his second album. He produced a song for K'naan titled "Better". He also worked on multiple tracks for Jennifer Lopez's 2011 album Love?, one of the songs being "Clothes Off", which did not make the album.

In 2012, Tedder co-wrote "Good in Goodbye" for Carrie Underwood's fourth album, Blown Away, released on May 1, 2012. He produced tracks for Maroon 5's fourth album, Overexposed. Tedder co-wrote and co-produced the song "Satellite" for British band The Wanted which appears on their US album released on April 24, 2012. He also worked on B.o.B's Strange Clouds, released in May 2012; he produced and co-wrote the single "So Good" and is featured on "Never Let You Go". He also recorded vocal tracks for Sebastian Ingrosso and Alesso's dance music track (which he also co-wrote), titled "Calling". Tedder was featured on Gym Class Heroes' single "The Fighter".

Tedder served as a judge for the 10th and 11th annual Independent Music Awards to support independent artists' careers. In 2013, Tedder was a celebrity mentor during the second season of The Voice (Australia) for Delta Goodrem's team. He then worked with Goodrem on "Heart Hypnotic". Tedder was also an advisor of Adam Levine (frontman of Maroon 5), for his team from the fifth season of the reality competition show The Voice (U.S.). Tedder was also present on Birdy's second album, Fire Within. In 2013, he also co-wrote and co-produced "XO" by Beyoncé, which was one of two lead singles from her self-titled fifth studio album.

Tedder wrote and produced the song "Ghost" by Ella Henderson, released on June 8, 2014. In 2014, Tedder collaborated on writing and producing with artists such as Maroon 5 for their fifth studio album V, and Taylor Swift for her fifth studio album 1989. He has also produced and wrote for Ariana Grande's second studio album My Everything. Tedder shares producing credits on U2's 2014 album, Songs of Innocence. It was also announced that he would be working with One Direction for their fourth studio album Four, and said that the song he had worked with them was titled "Got Away". Tedder also collaborated with Mikky Ekko for his album Time. In 2014, Tedder provided featured vocals for David Guetta's song "S.T.O.P." for his album Listen.

In 2015, Tedder wrote "I Want You To Know" with Zedd and Selena Gomez. He also penned "Flares" with The Script for their album No Sound Without Silence. Tedder also co-wrote "Remedy" with Adele for her third studio album, 25, and "Wildfire" for Demi Lovato's fifth studio album Confident. Tedder also provided vocals for the song "Scars" by Swedish DJ Alesso, featured on his debut studio album, Forever.

In 2016, Tedder featured on Cassius's song "The Missing" from their album Ibifornia. He had also teased collaborations with both The Chainsmokers and Echosmith via social media. Tedder produced "Happier" for Ed Sheeran for his third studio album ÷ (2017). In 2017, Tedder began work with Camila Cabello for her debut studio album Camila, released on January 12, 2018. It was during songwriting sessions that Tedder came into the picture. They collaborated on songs such as "Into It". They also wrote a song titled "It Ain't Easy", which was later sold to another artist. Tedder has opened up about what working with Cabello was like, stating that "[he] was so intimidated. She was so good." He added, "She's not only an incredible singer, but she's also the most talented young artist I think I've worked with songwriting in the longest time..." In 2020, Tedder co-wrote "Bet You Wanna", a song by the girl group Blackpink featuring Cardi B from their debut studio album The Album.

In January 2021, Tedder sold a majority stake of his music catalog for around $200 million to investment firm KKR.

Since 2021, Tedder has collaborated with many artists, including Tate McRae (co-producing her two chart-topping albums Think Later and So Close To What), BTS (contributing to four songs on their 2026 comeback album Arirang), John Legend (six songs on his ninth studio album Legend in 2022), Katseye ('Debut', their debut single, from 2024 EP SIS (Soft Is Strong)), Beyonce and Miley Cyrus ('II Most Wanted' from Beyonce's 2024 Cowboy Carter album), Michael Buble ('Higher' from 2022 album Higher), Sam Smith and Madonna ('Vulgar'), Lisa from Blackpink (three songs on 2025 album Alter Ego), Tomorrow X Together (two songs from 2023 album The Name Chapter: Freefall) and Jessie J (five songs on 2025 album Don't Tease Me with a Good Time).

=== OneRepublic ===
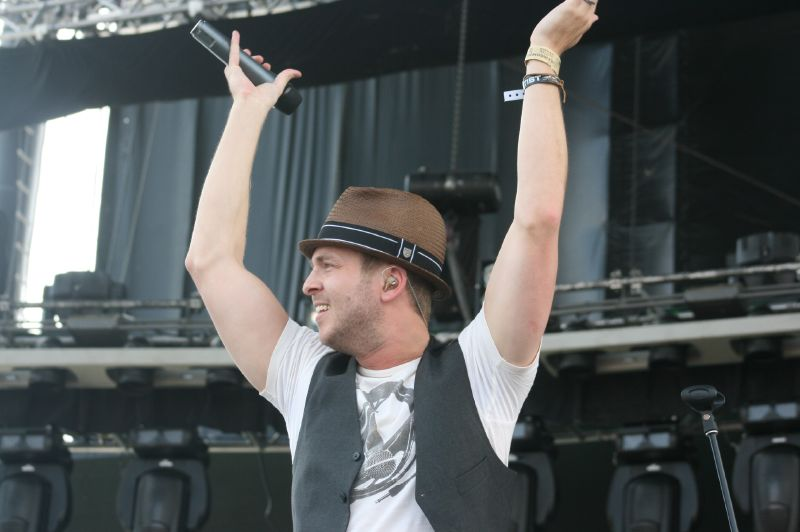
Tedder performing at Dick's Sporting Goods Park in Commerce City, Colorado, November 2009

In addition to producing, Tedder is the lead vocalist for the band OneRepublic. The six-member band consisting of Tedder, Zach Filkins, Eddie Fisher, Drew Brown, Brent Kutzle, and Brian Willett was formed in Colorado Springs, Colorado, in 2002 by Tedder and his high school classmate Zach Filkins. The band gained further exposure when their 2007 single, "Apologize", was remixed and re-released on Timbaland's compilation album, Timbaland Presents Shock Value. The remix became an international chart-topper in the fall of 2007. The song broke records after gaining 10,331 spins in one week. According to SoundScan, "Apologize" is the most legally downloaded song in US digital history with sales of over 4.3 million digital downloads in the US alone. It is also the second best-selling song of the decade. OneRepublic's debut album, Dreaming Out Loud, includes both the song's original version and remix with Timbaland, and was released on November 20, 2007, on Timbaland's Mosley Music Group imprint via Interscope Records. The band had previously been signed to Columbia Records, and their album was due to be released in 2006, but got pushed to 2007. Tedder explained: "Crap happened. People got fired. Labels merged and politics abounded". Subsequently, the band was released from their deal with Columbia, and they were signed by Timbaland in the summer of 2006 becoming the first rock band to be signed to Mosley Music Group. Tedder has commented on the success of "Apologize", stating: "The toughest thing to do is write a hit song, but we had a hit song before we had an album... What has happened has been really strange and really great." The band finished recording their second album, Waking Up, on August 25, 2009, and released the lead single "All the Right Moves" to radio and iTunes everywhere except Germany and Austria, where "Secrets" was released instead. The album was released on November 17, 2009, in the United States. To date, the second US single, "Secrets" has reached over 2 million digital downloads, and the third single "Good Life" broke into the Top 10 on iTunes and multiple radio stations.

Throughout 2012, the band made significant progress on their third studio album, Native. The album was released on March 26, 2013, to mostly positive reviews from music critics. It became the band's highest-charting album to date, with the album being their first in the top 10, debuting at number four on the Billboard 200. It sold 60,000 copies within its first week. A portion of the proceeds from the sales of the lead single "Feel Again", was donated to Save the Children's Every Beat Matters, a campaign to support training frontline health workers around the world. On October 7, 2016, OneRepublic's fourth album Oh My My was released. It included the singles "Kids", "Wherever I Go", and "Let's Hurt Tonight", with the latter being released in December of that year.

On May 17, 2019, the band released the single "Rescue Me". On August 27, OneRepublic announced the single "Wanted", which was released on September 6. A promotional single, "Somebody to Love", was released on September 11. On August 26 and 27, they performed at Red Rocks to a special first-ever collaboration with the Colorado Symphony with songs chosen and crafted with the orchestra, the band, and Red Rocks acoustics in mind. On September 15, 2019, Tedder announced that the new album was to be titled called Human, and would be released in November 2019. "Rescue Me", "Wanted" and "Somebody to Love" are all scheduled to be on the album.

On November 19, 2019, Tedder said that the album is planned to be released in spring 2020. On January 22, 2020, Tedder announced over Instagram that the new album would be wrapped by March. On March 10, 2020, the band announced their third single "Didn't I", which was released on March 13, 2020. Human was announced on the same day to be set for release on May 8, 2020. "Better Days" was released as the fourth single from the album on March 25, 2020, with all proceeds donated to MusiCares. As a result of the COVID-19 pandemic, the band announced the release of Human to have been postponed to the fall of 2020.

On May 5, 2021, the band released the song "Run" along with a music video. On July 1, 2021, they announced that Human would be released on August 27 and later on August 11, 2021, revealed the tracklist with 16 songs on the deluxe and 13 on the standard version. The album came out as scheduled on August 27 along with the single "Someday", along with a music video as well.

Tedder is a multi-instrumentalist. During OneRepublic's performances, he switches from singing lead vocals to playing guitar, bass guitar, tambourine, or piano. On occasion, he plays drums alongside the band's main percussionist, Eddie Fisher. Tedder also whistles in some of the band's music (Brian Willett does the live whistling, being the best whistler of the band), most well known in "I Ain't Worried".

=== Solo career ===
In 2019, Tedder wrote and produced his solo single debut "Right Where I'm Supposed to Be" as the Official Song of the 2019 Special Olympics World Summer Games in Abu Dhabi, United Arab Emirates in collaboration with Avril Lavigne, Luis Fonsi, Hussain Al Jassmi, Assala Nasri, and Tamer Hosny.

==== Songland ====
In 2019, it was announced that Tedder would be a mentor and producer-host on NBC's Songland alongside Ester Dean and Shane McAnally. The show aired for two seasons, with songs produced and written with Tedder being released in more episodes than compared to the program's fellow hosts.

== Personal life ==
Tedder is married to Genevieve, whom he met in college. They have two sons. Tedder's cousins, Adam, Ashley, and Austin Clark make up the band Sons of Sylvia and were formerly in The Clark Family Experience. Tedder co-wrote their song "Love Left to Lose". Although a Christian, Ryan Tedder has said that he does not want to be labeled as a Christian artist.

Tedder has an appreciation for the culinary arts, naming Iron Chef as his favorite show. He became involved with Southern Hospitality, a restaurant co-created in 2007 by Justin Timberlake at Second Avenue in Manhattan, when it opened a second location in Hell's Kitchen, Manhattan.

== Discography ==
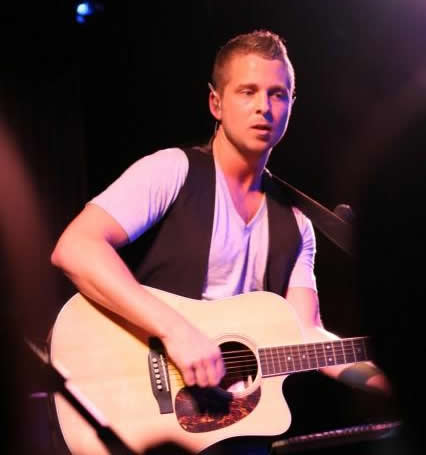
Tedder performing in 2011

Studio albums with OneRepublic

- Dreaming Out Loud (2007)
- Waking Up (2009)
- Native (2013)
- Oh My My (2016)
- Human (2021)
- Artificial Paradise (2024)

== Filmography ==
=== Television ===
Year	Title	Role	Notes
2008	Smallville	Himself	Episode: "Hero"
2011	Platinum Hit	Himself	
2012	Smash	Himself	Episode: "The Coup"
2013, 2020	The Voice	Himself	Mentor for Team Adam Levine (season 5), Episode: "Live Final Top 5 Performances" (season 18)
2017	School of Rock	Mick Bronson	Episode: "Don't Stop Believin"
2019–2020	Songland	Himself	Credited with being a judge and a producer
2021	California Dreaming	Executive Producer, Writer, Soundtrack	
2022	That's My Jam	Himself	Season 1, Episode 4 (Aired 01/17)
2022	Pitch Perfect: Bumper in Berlin	Reporter	Episode: "Lebensabschnittspartner"; Soundtrack

== Awards and nominations ==
Tedder has received three Grammy Awards out of 13 nominations, two Latin Grammy Awards, and an Asian Pop Music Award, and has been nominated for one Golden Globe.

Grammy Awards
Year	Nominee / work	Award	Result
2009	"Apologize"	Best Pop Performance by a Duo or Group with Vocals	Nominated
2009	"Bleeding Love"	Record of the Year	Nominated
2010	"Halo"	Record of the Year	Nominated
2010	I Am... Sasha Fierce	Album of the Year	Nominated
2012	21	Album of the Year	Won
2012	Himself	Producer of the Year (Non-Classical)	Nominated
2015	Beyoncé	Album of the Year	Nominated
2016	1989	Album of the Year	Won
2017	25	Album of the Year	Won
2022	Justice	Album of the Year	Nominated
2022	Montero	Album of the Year	Nominated
2026	"Just Keep Watching"	Best Dance Pop Recording	Nominated
2027	"La Perla"	Best Latin Song	Pending

Latin Grammy Awards
Year	Nominee / work	Award	Result
2026	"La Perla"	Song of the Year	Won
2026	"La Perla"	Best Pop Song	Won

Golden Globes
Year	Nominee / work	Award	Result
2017	"Faith"	Best Original Song	Nominated

Asian Pop Music Awards
Year	Nominee / work	Award	Result
2023	"The Girls"	Best Arranger (Overseas)	Won
2024	"Rockstar"	Best Producer (Overseas)	Nominated
