= Run (OneRepublic song) =

2021 single by OneRepublic

- Cover art for Latin version with Mariah Angeliq

Single by OneRepublic

from the album Human
- Released: May 5, 2021
- Recorded: 2020
- Length: 2:48
- Label: Interscope; Mosley
- Songwriters: Ryan Tedder; Brent Kutzle; John Nathaniel; Tyler Spry
- Producers: Ryan Tedder; Brent Kutzle; John Nathaniel; Tyler Spry

OneRepublic singles chronology
"Wild Life" (2021)	"Run" (2021)	"Someday" (2021)

Music video
- "Run" on YouTube

"Run" is a song by American band OneRepublic, taken from their fifth studio album Human (2021). It was released as the fifth single from that album through Interscope Records on May 5, 2021. It was co-written and produced by frontman Ryan Tedder along with bassist Brent Kutzle, John Nathaniel and Tyler Spry. A "Latin version" with Mariah Angeliq was released on July 23, followed by two official remixes, Jacaranda remix on July 30 and Collins remix on August 13.

== Music video ==
A music video to accompany the release of "Run" was first released onto YouTube on May 5, 2021.

== Charts ==
=== Weekly charts ===
Weekly chart performance for "Run"
Chart (2021)	Peak position
Australia (ARIA)	56
Austria (Ö3 Austria Top 40)	24
Belgium (Ultratop 50 Flanders)	7
Belgium (Ultratop 50 Wallonia)	12
Canada Hot 100 (Billboard)	56
Canada Hot AC (Billboard)	45
Czech Republic Airplay (ČNS IFPI)	2
Czech Republic Singles Digital (ČNS IFPI)	11
Finland Airplay (Radiosoittolista)	37
France (SNEP)	86
Germany (GfK)	19
Global 200 (Billboard)	67
Hungary (Rádiós Top 40)	19
Hungary (Stream Top 40)	34
Ireland (IRMA)	40
Italy (FIMI)	31
Latvia (EHR Top 40)	9
Lithuania (AGATA)	61
Netherlands (Dutch Top 40)	4
Netherlands (Single Top 100)	20
New Zealand Hot Singles (RMNZ)	10
Poland Airplay (ZPAV)	7
Portugal (AFP)	161
San Marino (SMRRTV Top 50)	7
Slovakia Airplay (ČNS IFPI)	7
Slovakia Singles Digital (ČNS IFPI)	21
South Africa (RISA)	65
Sweden (Sverigetopplistan)	77
Switzerland (Schweizer Hitparade)	15
UK Singles (Official Charts)	90
US Bubbling Under Hot 100 (Billboard)	11
US Digital Song Sales (Billboard)	34

=== Year-end charts ===
2021 year-end chart performance for "Run"
Chart (2021)	Position
Austria (Ö3 Austria Top 40)	46
Belgium (Ultratop Flanders)	23
Belgium (Ultratop Wallonia)	52
Germany (Official German Charts)	54
Global 200 (Billboard)	192
Hungary (Stream Top 40)	87
Italy (FIMI)	89
Netherlands (Dutch Top 40)	10
Netherlands (Single Top 100)	57
Poland (ZPAV)	81
Switzerland (Schweizer Hitparade)	44

2022 year-end chart performance for "Run"
Chart (2022)	Position
Belgium (Ultratop 50 Flanders)	109

== Certifications ==
Certifications for "Run"
Region	Certification	Certified units/sales
Australia (ARIA)	2× Platinum	140,000^{‡}
Austria (IFPI Austria)	Platinum	30,000^{‡}
Brazil (Pro-Música Brasil)	Platinum	40,000^{‡}
Canada (Music Canada)	3× Platinum	240,000^{‡}
Denmark (IFPI Danmark)	Gold	45,000^{‡}
France (SNEP)	Diamond	333,333^{‡}
Germany (BVMI)	Gold	200,000^{‡}
Italy (FIMI)	2× Platinum	200,000^{‡}
New Zealand (RMNZ)	2× Platinum	60,000^{‡}
Poland (ZPAV)	Platinum	50,000^{‡}
Spain (Promusicae)	Gold	30,000^{‡}
United Kingdom (BPI)	Gold	400,000^{‡}
United States (RIAA)	Platinum	1,000,000^{‡}
^{‡} Sales+streaming figures based on certification alone.
