= Fraser Kershaw =

American activist and filmmaker

Fraser Hart Kershaw Jr.
- Cinema Campo de’ Fiori, Roma Prisma Film Awards. October 2026.
- Occupations: Activist; Soccer Coach; Film
- Years active: 2014–present
- Known for: The Arts; Coach; Clean Water; Philanthropy; Social Change
- Parents: Fraser Kershaw; Lorrie Gawryla
- Relatives: Stanley Preschutti (brother)

Fraser Kershaw
Team information
- Current team: Philadelphia Union MLS

Managerial career
- Years: Team
- 2020: Lancaster Mennonite School
- 2021: Penn State Nittany Lions, Altoona
- 2022: The King's College, Manhattan, NYC
- 2023–24: Philadelphia Union Youth Coach
- 2025-26: U.S. Virgin Islands Soccer Federation, FIFA, Engagement

Fraser Hart Kershaw Jr. is a humanitarian, filmmaker and soccer manager, known primarily for his work raising awareness about global water issues. He has been involved in producing and starring in documentaries that focus on water access and sanitation, advocating for clean water projects that blend social causes with his creative pursuits. He is also recognized for his charitable efforts, working with organizations to promote sustainable water solutions in developing countries. He made his television debut acting in the 2016 televised international feature film Behind the Water. He was a figure in the new industry of filmmaking for the U.S. Virgin Islands. On January 26, 2021, Kershaw was announced as the head coach of the men's soccer program at Penn State University in the United States. Kershaw continued a century-long legacy of soccer coaching starting in Altoona, Pennsylvania.

== Early life ==
Kershaw grew up playing the game internationally. Throughout his career playing in United States, The Virgin Islands, Europe, and Latin America. Kershaw spent his formative teens on the island of St. John, Virgin Islands which heavily tied his later career to the region's emerging film and soccer industry. On the island, Kershaw would carry a five-gallon tank of water for several blocks up a steep hill in 100°F heat to his home. His mother worked as a medical missionary in natural disasters in Latin America. In 2006, Kershaw relocated to the city of Morelia, in the country of Mexico. His father from the Caribbean, became a landscaper and artist near The Penn State University in The United States.

== Film career ==
On July 19, 2014, The Sacramento Observer announced Kershaw and National Geographic's Doug Clevenger in the capital of California to showcase a televised portion of a new film about water. When Kershaw appeared on AT&T he stated the global water problem could be solved one town at a time. Premiering on earth day 2016 Caribbean Entertainment Magazine stated Kershaw's film, Behind the Water, reached every territory in the Caribbean, Canada, the UK and the northeast United States. He hosted the 2016 televised feature film Behind the Water. Film Works TV showcased Kershaw working within the industry alongside actor Tim Russ. Kershaw and musician Brent Kutzle from OneRepublic collaborate on the musical score for the film. Film Score Monthly, magazine showcased the score to incorporate a blend of strings and bass.

The Jamaican diaspora states Kershaw helps the Caribbean people with life giving efforts that spark change . Kershaw can be seen in television commercials that are noted as earth friendly. Modern Traveler Magazine showcased Kershaw filming in never before documented areas of Latin America. Travel Magazine stated Kershaw has slept in huts without electricity to luxurious accommodations and these experiences reinforced his opinion that no matter the environment everybody deserves the right to drink clean water. The Toronto Yogi Times recorded Kershaw voicing his concern for possible solutions in Los Angeles .

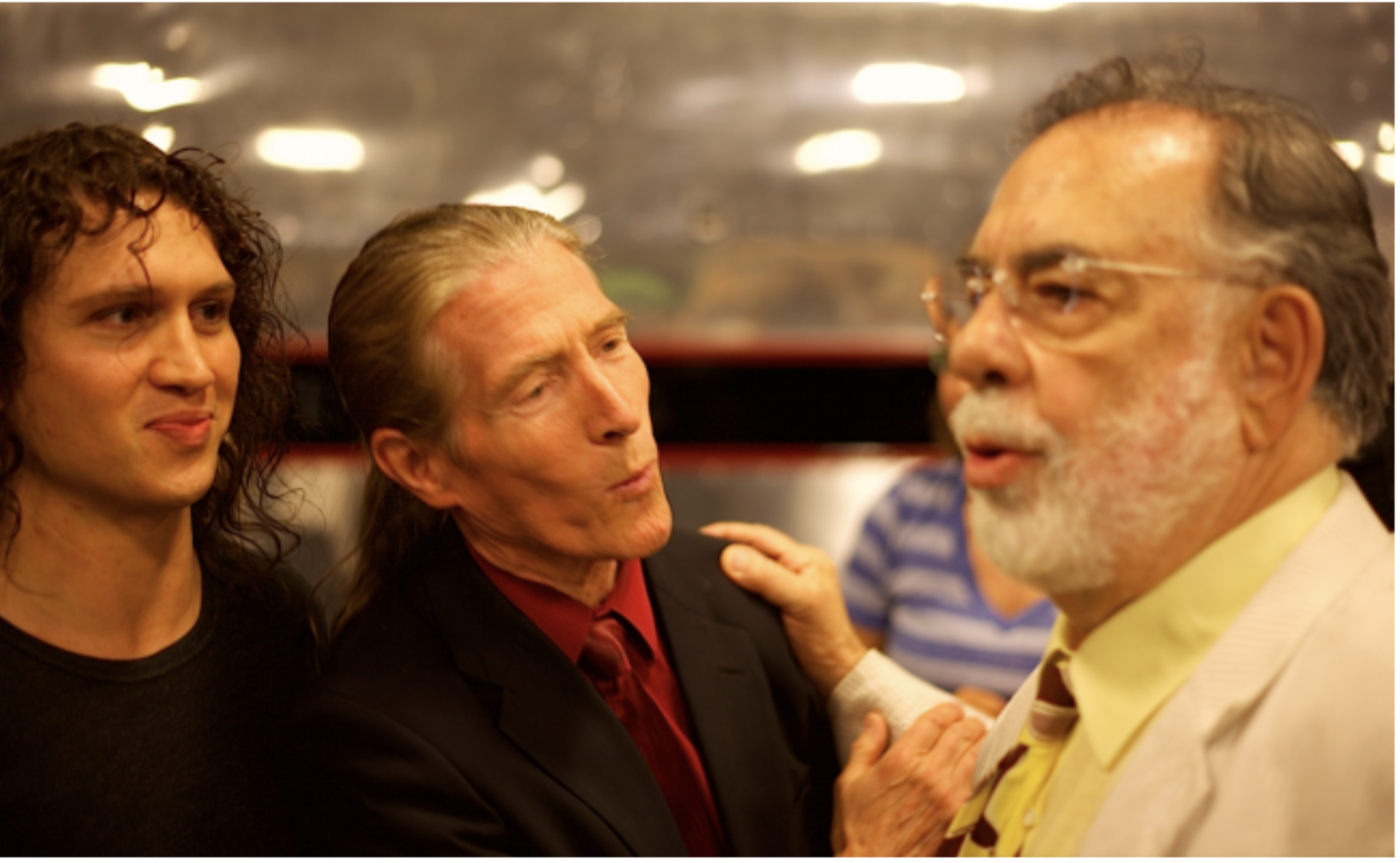
Project Distant Vision

Kershaw in MovieMaker magazine collaborating with Greg Mellott and Francis Ford Coppola on a new art form called live cinema.

On April 7, 2019, he was recognized in the Virgin Islands film industry. The VI Consortium claimed the first film festival to be a success.

Kershaw, with a group from the U.S. Virgin Islands Department of Tourism, USVI Council on the Arts, Crucian Gold, Cape Air, CBS, ABC, and the Economic Development Authority formed the first Caribbean Film and Artistic Cinematic Festival. In 2025, Kershaw works within the greater Virgin Islands producing content for the Virgin Islands Public Broadcasting System PBS-WTJX. Kershaw known for collaborating on film with J.A.C. Redford of Avatar.

=== The Summer of Love ===
In 2024, Fraser Kershaw directed, 'The Summer of Love.' Since its release the has film captured international attention while juries deemed the film a process of filmmaking called, 'Kinetic Naturalism.' As of October 2026, the film has been acknowledged at 69 film festivals globally in official programming across six continents, accumulating 15 international awards in multiple categories. The film was classified as a lyrical and romantic documentary which has been showcased at film festivals around the globe receiving international intrigue and recognition.

Kershaw studied the natural light to achieve the film's distinctive visual style, scheduled production based on natural light, allowing the sun's patterns to dictate a schedule, exploring new forms and perspectives within cinema. The film has traditionally been classified within the experimental film category and genre and has expressed the need for experimentation and risk taking. Film Matters Magazine has recognized The Summer of Love, noting its global reach and wide acceptance throughout the 2025 festival circuit. The film has garnered nominations and awards in multiple categories at festivals in countries including France, Italy, India, and the United States. New York Film Awards highlighted parallels between his coaching and his directing, noting the similarities in team, trust and creativity. It claimed 'Best Film' among thousands of global entries at The International Rotary Film Festival held in Istanbul, Turkey announced the film, winning 'best'.

The Golden FEMI Film Festival, held in Bulgaria boasts 7,000 submissions from 130 countries, broadcast to over 60 countries and attended by Bulgaria's Vice President, Iliyana Yotova, awarded Kershaw's film to be the best. In the Rome Short Film Festival, Kershaw discussed an old shoulder camera alongside long time friends, leveraging familiarity with local settings. Kershaw stated to Roma Cinephilia Mag, "Walking back into these spots was like second nature, like all the things we experienced from youth, were not there anymore, like it was all a dream, and here we are, still sitting in the same spot of our youth." At a Barcelona Film Festival, Kershaw's initial visit to Barcelona, Spain, as a teenager marked the first time he expressed reluctance to leave a place while playing soccer. As an adult, he returns to Barcelona presenting 'The Summer of Love' within the same kilometer radius of his first visit near the same stadium.

The Seoul Korea, international film festival revealed the film as daring, and unconventional celebrating innovative artistry. Kershaw wins best experimental film in London, England. NBC reported The 18th annual Mosaic World Film Festival, held at the RPL Nordlof Center on Sunday, September 14, 2025, awarded Fraser Kershaw's The Summer of Love as Best Experimental Short Film, a work embodying the festival's motto "Make a film. Change the world," held in the United States. Kershaw revealed at the Stockholm City Film Festival in Sweden that "there is something supernatural and unexplainable driving outcomes." An official selection announced at The Latino & Native American Film Festival (LANAFF).

Time & Perspective: Kershaw notes pacing was intentional, refusing to treat the work as a short film category as the mental odyssey around two souls experiencing love across generations is the film's physical anchor under a ritualistic tree located quietly at the center of the community.

The Technical Execution: Instead of relying on a traditional cinema setup, the crew stitched together footage from nine separate cameras from a $45,000 rig down to a $1,000 camera; Kershaw chose the chaotic technique because he believed it mimics how human memory flutters into the mind imperfectly lit and arriving on its town terms.

The Coppola Influence: Juries deemed the film process 'Kinetic Naturalism' heavily shaped by previous work alongside Francis Ford Coppola on a Live Cinema (Distant Vision) project; the set was dictated by the changing of natural sunlight with spontaneous, unscripted human interactions; Kershaw explained that he used Coppola's Live Cinema and applied it in nature.

Dedication & The Cinema Experience: Kershaw revealed that he edited the film while caring for a rescued street cat named Kiki and he noted that the film was able to travel around the world because of her, and he deeply grieved from her passing.

Rejection of Streaming: While streaming platforms has asked for the rights, he refused; in interviews he stated he believes this lives on a large screen for a shared community experience, rather than living "between two advertisements on a cell phone".

== Public speaking and activism ==
Kershaw can be seen presenting at public university film forums. Kershaw has contributed his experiences to public universities. While performing in the theater he's known to become emotional and challenge the audience. At the University of Oklahoma Kershaw performed and challenged the student body to pursue their purpose with life changing ideas.

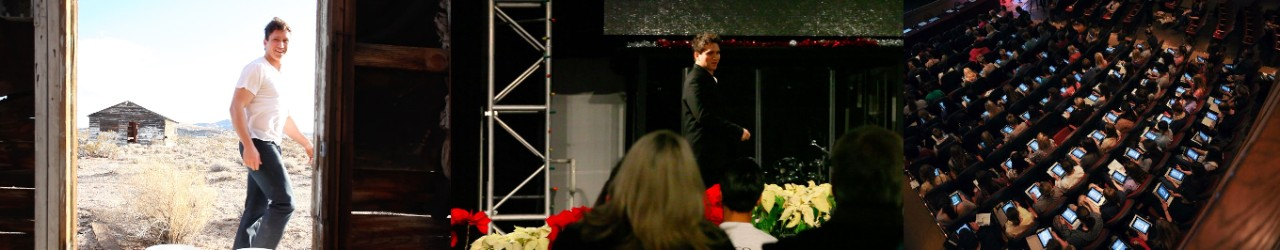
Fraser Kershaw performing at the University of Oklahoma (OU, Sooners), Norman Oklahoma

Kershaw addressed the country of El Salvador on national news across 7 million homes bringing together congressional leaders and administration officials in hopes to furnish clean water to communities. The Caribbean's Drive Time Radio Show publicized Kershaw's clean water campaign and recorded him speaking out against the lack of sanitation in rural communities and he said, "If everybody stops going to the bathroom right now then we can save lives, but that's never going to happen." Kershaw was called 'He No Faking Jamaican' for his activism in the Caribbean.

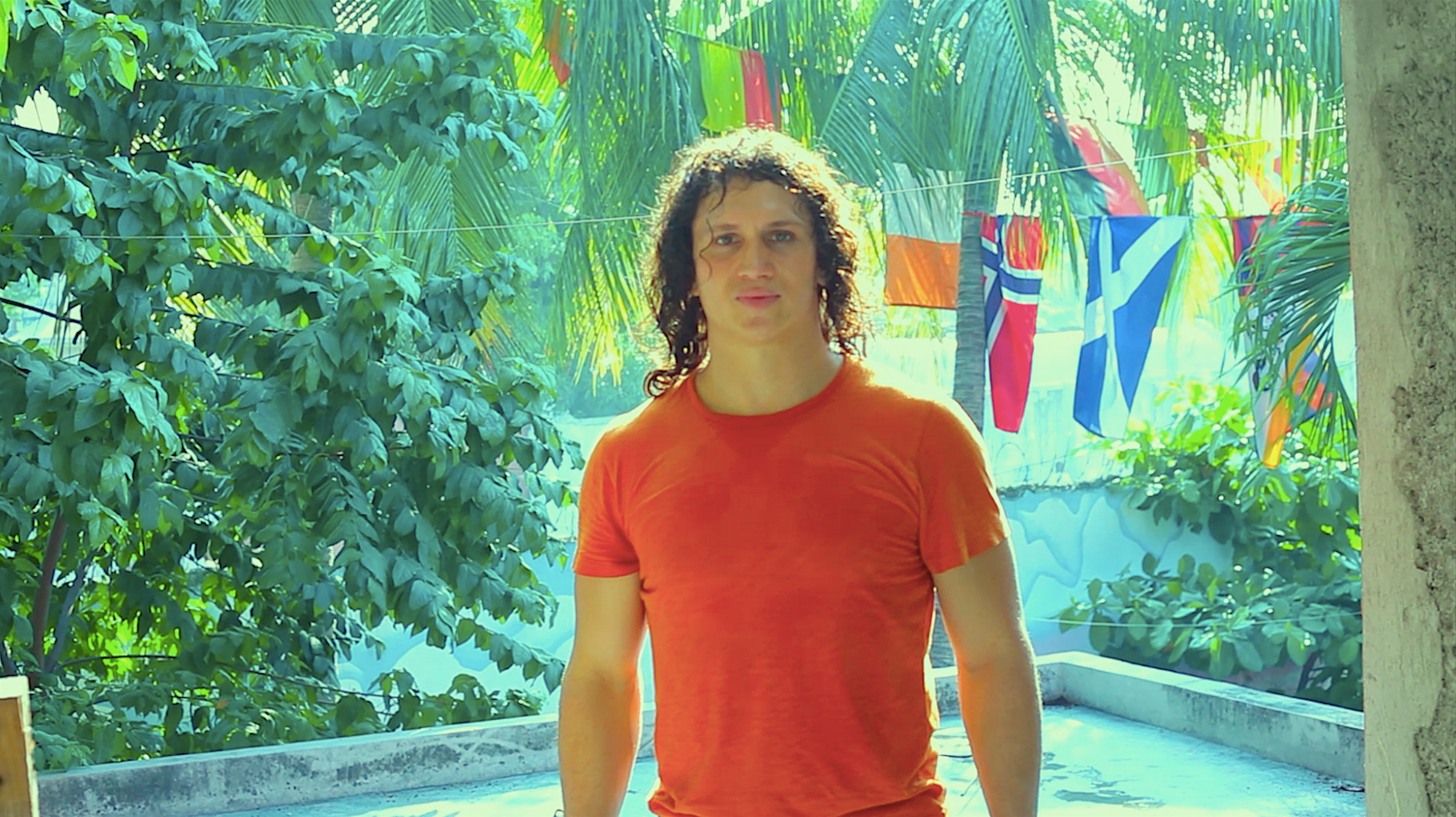
Kershaw Port-au-Prince, November 2014

In 2014, Kershaw documented and explored the communities of Port-au-Prince with overwhelming obstacles. In November 2014 he publicly spoke with community leaders in the capital of Haiti about launching health campaigns for community leaders to provide clean water. He was recorded saying, "I know the Haitian people because I am the Haitian people, we are both human, one and the same, we thirst together and we drink together, we want water that heals instead of steals." He received the nickname 'The Prince of Hope' for his efforts to provide clean water in Port-au-Prince, Haiti. Kershaw and Dr. Jennifer Hetzner of California appeared on ABC presenting the impact of dirty water.

On January 22, 2015, The Nevada Today reported Kershaw at the Wells Fargo Auditorium performing at the University of Nevada, Reno for the student body.

On February 24, 2015, Kershaw presented at the International Law Society speaker series at the Maurer School of Law in Indiana University where he presented his international experiences working with pillars of rural cinema. On March 28, 2015, he helped start a film festival for the student body at the University of Cincinnati where he encouraged the filmmakers to be fearless and compared the event to a sweaty gym full of boxers ready to spar. Cincinnati.com reported the film festival an important piece of history for Cincinnati.

In Lawrence, Kansas on Earth Day 2015, Kershaw performed in a full theater at the University of Kansas and during the event Kershaw said, "This Earth Day, we are far beyond a debate about the importance of water." He added, "We're focused on taking action, preparing communities here locally on leading an international effort for action." The University of Kansas Department of Film and Media studies stated "Kershaw inspired and energized, entertained their thoughts about helping while still remaining very personable and humble." Kershaw has said while performing he hopes people will continue to chase after life-changing ideas and passions.

== Coaching Legacy ==
The U.S. Soccer Players organization linked Kershaw to World Cup coach Bill Jeffrey, who led the USA men's national soccer team at the 1950 FIFA World Cup in Brazil. Jeffrey, the Scottish native led the U.S.A. men's team over England in one of the greatest upsets in world cup history and later died in 1966. Jeffrey's Penn State coaching lineage worked through four generations. By 1970, the captain of Jeffrey's 1950 world cup team, Walter Bahr became head coach from 1974 to 1988. His assistant, Barry Gorman, became head coach through the 2009 season. In 2021, the connection to Jeffrey continues with Coach Gorman's youth player, Fraser Kershaw, who entered the head coaching job at Penn State Altoona. The United Soccer Coaches connect four separate generations of soccer, reaching a 100-year continual coaching succession.

In Kershaw's first year as an NCAA head coach, he led a young Penn State soccer team to the program's first winning record in half-a-decade. His men's soccer program had the best start since 2007 with a nationally ranked offense earning player awards regionally and national. The Altoona Mirror stated Kershaw was the right man for the job. April 16, 2021 Nuno Gomes of the Portugal national football team congratulating Kershaw and the Penn State team members.

Sports History Network showcases Kershaw and Penn State Soccer team members wearing the same stripes back dating the historic year of 1812.

In 2022, Kershaw became the head coach of The King's College Men's Soccer team in Manhattan, New York City in the United States. At sunrise, Kershaw would jog with the team under the Statue of Liberty in Brooklyn, New York City. The World Soccer Talk quoted him stating, "She is holding up a yellow card to me as a warning" Kershaw lives within walking distance of Costa Rica national football team head coach Steve Sampson in a small beach town, where he finds reflection and mentorship in the world of coaching.

In 2023, Kershaw was a youth coach at Philadelphia Union in the Major League within the United States. In 2025, Kershaw serves in an engagement role within the United States Virgin Islands National Soccer Team Federation. Kershaw interviewed in New York City, United States, "If anyone has ever trained and played the beautiful game with serious longevity, they look at it like sheet music with hints of Mozart as it has a fluid unconscious nature to it, like music."

== Charity work and other interests ==
Kershaw started an initiative called Water Works and said its focus is to provide clean and safe drinking water to people in developing nations. He has said in Vitamin Retailer Magazine that Water Works started the day he saw people weeping over water-related deaths. The Fort Lauderdale Daily News boasted Kershaw using its airport as his launch pad to give people clean water. The Lodi news said while Kershaw was in Indonesia he lost ten pounds from a water borne illness and a doctor traveled to document Kershaw's condition.

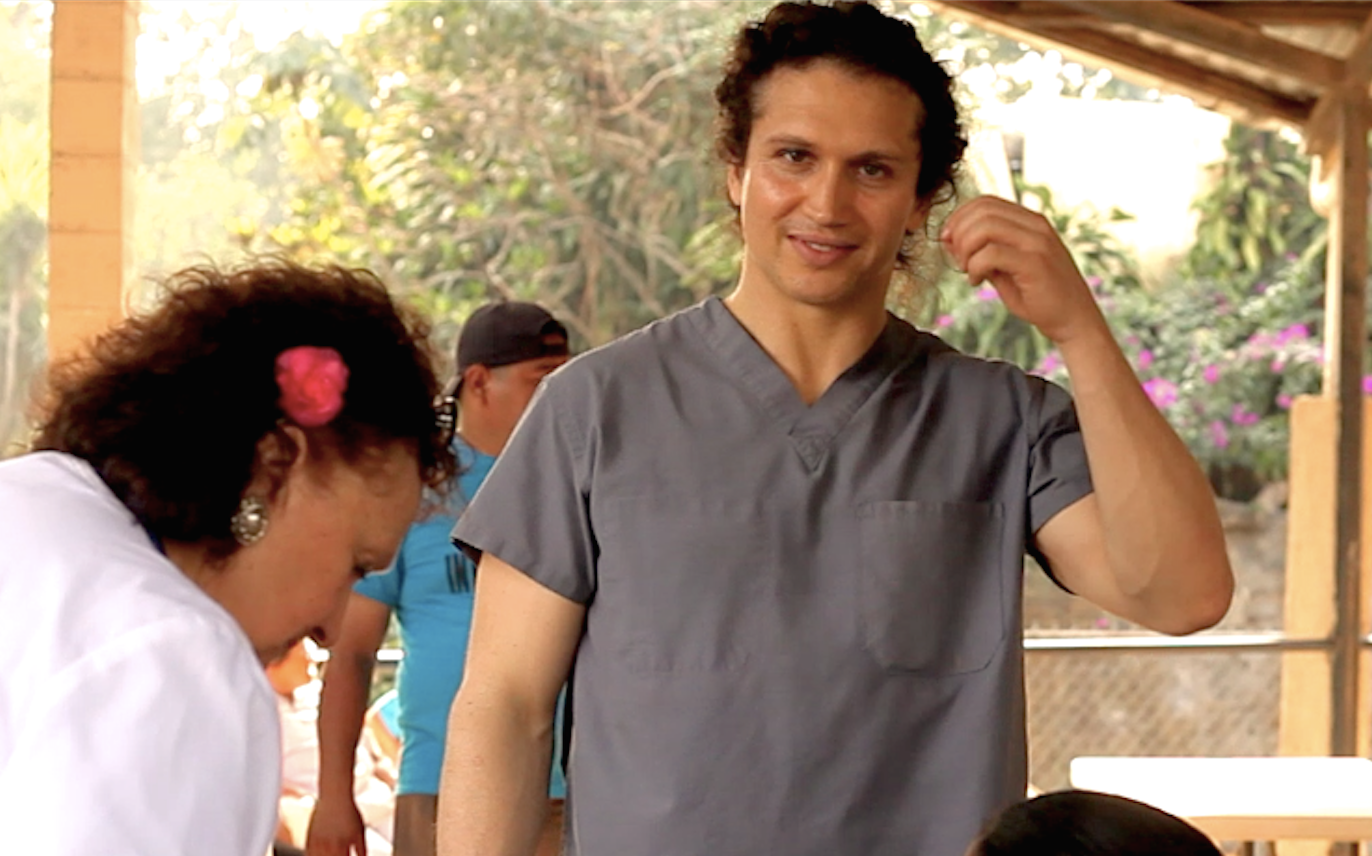
Kershaw, San Salvador, March 2015

Green Clean Magazine declared Kershaw as one of the "People We Love" stating he believes the new generation is done with people who spew facts, figures, and formulas for fun and there must be a call to action. Modern Latina Magazine showed Kershaw studying sugar samples from tree leaves as a way to pinpoint a drought to assess solutions with its data. Luxury Travel Magazine featured Kershaw testing out prototype luggage designed by the Swedish brand Thule Group.

Kershaw created an international soccer tournament in Virginia which brought support to orphans and widows. Kershaw has stated in an interview that every person dreams of being loved and accepted and along the way many lose faith in humanity and his team's goal is to inspire everyone on the planet who loves fellow humans to empower another Spirit, engage with the world, and make a difference. Kershaw has worked in rural areas assisting people with clean water and Mother Earth News compared the process to a wild ride.

== Personal life ==
In 2005, Kershaw lived in California. He mentioned when he travels he gains clarity about important decisions versus when he is inside his own bubble at home. Kershaw said in Carib Entertainment Magazine that he likes when failure is possible because it makes him feel alive and that failure excites him as it mimics life and drives his projects. It has been recorded that he throws away his cell phone while doing creative work.
