= Didn't I (OneRepublic song) =

Single by OneRepublic

from the album Human
- Released: March 13, 2020
- Recorded: 2020
- Genre: Pop rock
- Length: 3:27
- Label: Interscope; Mosley
- Songwriters: Ryan Tedder; Brent Kutzle; Zach Skelton; James Abrahart; Kyrre Gørvell-Dahll
- Producers: Ryan Tedder; Brent Kutzle; John Nathaniel

OneRepublic singles chronology
"Wanted" (2019)	"Didn't I" (2020)	"Better Days" (2020)

Music video
- "Didn't I" on YouTube

"Didn't I" is a song by American band OneRepublic, released as the third single from their fifth studio album Human through Interscope Records on March 13, 2020. It was co-written by frontman Ryan Tedder with bassist Brent Kutzle, Zach Skelton, James Abrahart and Kyrre "Kygo" Gørvell-Dahll.

== Background and composition ==
Talking about the song on New Music Daily with Zane Lowe on Apple Music, Tedder said, "So 'Didn't I' came from a place of somebody very dear to me… A couple that got divorced and I'm surrounded… My parents, got divorced, my wife's parents got divorced. Everybody, you know? We have friends that are going through it right now and I had this idea that when you marry somebody or you choose to be with them, it’s because you've had a lot of beautiful moments and somewhere the discord gets in. But then once you have the distance, and it does break up, and you do go through that divorce, you still have those moments. You look back and you go, you know what? This ended in a disaster, but weren't we amazing, when we were amazing? Wasn’t it good? It wasn’t all bad. There was a moment, didn't I love you? Didn't we fly? Wasn't this everything we thought it was, until it wasn't? And so that's really what the song's about."

In terms of musical notation, "Didn't I" is written in the key of E major and has a tempo of 124 beats per minute. Steered by piano and violin, the song follow a chord progression of C♯m – E – B – A in its verses, pre-chorus, and chorus and a chord progression of F♯m – A – C♯m – B in its bridge.

== Music video ==
A music video to accompany the release of "Didn't I" was first released onto YouTube on March 13, 2020.

== Personnel ==
Credits adapted from Tidal.

- Brent Kutzle – producer, composer, lyricist
- John Nathaniel – producer, co-producer, mixer, studio personnel
- Ryan Tedder – producer, composer, lyricist
- James Abrahart – composer, lyricist
- Kyrre Gørvell-Dahll – composer, lyricist
- Zach Skelton – composer, lyricist

== Charts ==
=== Weekly charts ===
Chart (2020)	Peak position
Austria (Ö3 Austria Top 40)	66
Belgium (Ultratip Bubbling Under Flanders)	19
Belgium (Ultratip Bubbling Under Wallonia)	2
Hungary (Rádiós Top 40)	8
Hungary (Single Top 40)	38
Lithuania (AGATA)	90
New Zealand Hot Singles (RMNZ)	14
Slovakia Airplay (ČNS IFPI)	23
Sweden (Sverigetopplistan)	84
Switzerland (Schweizer Hitparade)	38
US Bubbling Under Hot 100 (Billboard)	19
US Digital Song Sales (Billboard)	9

=== Year-end charts ===
Chart (2020)	Position
Hungary (Rádiós Top 40)	41

Chart (2021)	Position
Hungary (Rádiós Top 40)	83

== Certifications ==
Certifications for "Didn't I"
Region	Certification	Certified units/sales
Australia (ARIA)	Gold	35,000^{‡}
United States (RIAA)	Gold	500,000^{‡}
^{‡} Sales+streaming figures based on certification alone.

== Release history ==
Region	Date	Format	Label	Ref.
Various	March 13, 2020	Digital download; streaming	Interscope	
Italy	March 13, 2020	Contemporary hit radio	Universal	
