= Better Days (OneRepublic song) =

2020 single by OneRepublic

- Live quarantine recording cover

Single by OneRepublic

from the album Human
- Released: March 25, 2020
- Recorded: 2020
- Length: 2:24
- Label: Interscope; Mosley
- Songwriters: Ryan Tedder; Brent Kutzle; John Nathaniel
- Producers: Ryan Tedder; Brent Kutzle; John Nathaniel; Tyler Spry

OneRepublic singles chronology
| "Didn't I" (2020) | "Better Days" (2020) | "Lose Somebody" (2020) |

Music video
- "Better Days" on YouTube

"Better Days" is a song by American band OneRepublic, taken from their fifth studio album Human. It was released as the fourth single from that album through Interscope Records on March 25, 2020. It was co-written by frontman Ryan Tedder with bassist Brent Kutzle, John Nathaniel and Tyler Spry. The song was inspired by the COVID-19 pandemic.

== Background ==
The song was inspired by the ongoing COVID-19 pandemic upending lives across the globe according to frontman Ryan Tedder, who said, "We were in the final week of our fifth album deadline when a global pandemic was declared by the WHO. A few of us unknowingly got exposed to somebody with COVID-19 in London and ended up in quarantine in L.A. at my studio for two weeks. With only two songs left to finish, one of them happened to be 'Better Days'. We write about real experiences and events that happen to us - this is what happens when you write a song during a crisis."

== Music video ==
A music video to accompany the release of "Better Days" was first released onto YouTube on April 13, 2020. It depicts life during the pandemic, such as people staying at home and wearing face masks.

== Personnel ==
Credits adapted from Tidal.

- Brent Kutzle – producer, composer, lyricist
- John Nathaniel – producer, composer, lyricist, mixer, studio personnel
- Ryan Tedder – producer, composer, lyricist
- Tyler Spry – producer, co-producer

== Charts ==
| Chart (2020) | Peak position |
|---|---|
| Hungary (Rádiós Top 40) | 39 |
| Italy (FIMI) Italian version | 38 |
| New Zealand Hot Singles (RMNZ) | 29 |
| San Marino (SMRRTV Top 50) Italian version | 25 |
| Switzerland (Schweizer Hitparade) | 53 |
| US Digital Song Sales (Billboard) | 11 |

== Certifications ==
| Region | Certification | Certified units/sales |
|---|---|---|
| Australia (ARIA) | Gold | 35,000^{‡} |
| Italy (FIMI) | Platinum | 70,000^{‡} |
| New Zealand (RMNZ) | Gold | 15,000^{‡} |
| United States (RIAA) | Gold | 500,000^{‡} |
^{‡} Sales+streaming figures based on certification alone.

== Release history ==
| Region | Date | Format | Version | Label | Ref. |
|---|---|---|---|---|---|
| Various | March 25, 2020 | Digital download; streaming | Original | Interscope | |
| Various | May 14, 2020 | Digital download; streaming | Live Quarantine Recording | Interscope | |
| Various | May 22, 2020 | Digital download; streaming | Mejores Días | Interscope | |
| Various | May 29, 2020 | Digital download; streaming | Giorni Migliori | Interscope | |
| Italy | May 29, 2020 | Contemporary hit radio | Giorni Migliori | Universal | |
