= Wanted (OneRepublic song) =

Single by OneRepublic

from the album Human
- Released: September 6, 2019
- Genre: Pop • pop rock
- Length: 2:16
- Label: Interscope; Mosley
- Songwriters: Ryan Tedder; Brent Kutzle; Casey Smith; Tyler Spry; Zach Skelton
- Producers: Ryan Tedder; Brent Kutzle; Tyler Spry; Steve Wilmot

OneRepublic singles chronology
"Rescue Me" (2019)	"Wanted" (2019)	"Didn't I" (2020)

Music video
- "Wanted" on YouTube

"Wanted" is a song by American band OneRepublic, released as the second single from their fifth studio album Human (2021) through Interscope Records on September 6, 2019. It was co-written by frontman Ryan Tedder with bassist Brent Kutzle, and Casey Smith, Tyler Spry and Zach Skelton. On December 20, 2019, a new version titled "Wanted (String Mix)", was released, which features more string instruments.

== Music video ==
The music video was shown to Universal Music Group executives in Berlin in September 2019; it was noted for Tedder's dance performance. On December 23, 2019, a performance video was released for the "String Mix", showing Ryan Tedder singing while the Colorado Symphony played.

== Track listing ==
- Digital download
1. "Wanted" – 2:16
- Digital download – TT Spry Remix
1. "Wanted" (TT Spry Remix) – 2:54
- Digital download – String Mix
1. "Wanted" (String Mix) – 2:15

== Charts ==
Chart (2019–2020)	Peak position
Australia (ARIA)	78
Czech Republic Airplay (ČNS IFPI)	57
Czech Republic Singles Digital (ČNS IFPI)	76
Ireland (IRMA)	75
Lithuania (AGATA)	36
New Zealand Hot Singles (RMNZ)	17
Scottish Singles Sales (Official Charts)	86
Slovakia Airplay (ČNS IFPI)	44
Slovakia Singles Digital (ČNS IFPI)	82
Sweden Heatseeker (Sverigetopplistan)	5
Switzerland (Schweizer Hitparade)	37
UK Singles Downloads (Official Charts)	99
US Bubbling Under Hot 100 (Billboard)	9
US Digital Song Sales (Billboard)	14
US Rolling Stone Top 100	95

== Certifications ==
Region	Certification	Certified units/sales
Australia (ARIA)	Gold	35,000^{‡}
Brazil (Pro-Música Brasil)	Gold	20,000^{‡}
New Zealand (RMNZ)	Gold	15,000^{‡}
United States (RIAA)	Gold	500,000^{‡}
^{‡} Sales+streaming figures based on certification alone.

== Release history ==
Region	Date	Format	Version	Label	Ref.
Various	September 6, 2019	Digital download; streaming	Original	Interscope	
Italy	September 13, 2019	Contemporary hit radio	Original	Universal	
Various	December 19, 2019	Digital download; streaming	TT Spry Remix	Interscope	
Various	December 20, 2019	Digital download; streaming	String Mix	Interscope	
