= Rescue Me (OneRepublic song) =

Single by OneRepublic

from the album Human
- Released: May 17, 2019
- Recorded: 2018–2019
- Genre: Electropop • pop rock • pop • dance-pop
- Length: 2:37
- Label: Interscope; Mosley
- Songwriters: Ryan Tedder; Brent Kutzle
- Producers: Ryan Tedder; Brent Kutzle; Tyler Spry

OneRepublic singles chronology
"Bones" (2019)	"Rescue Me" (2019)	"Wanted" (2019)

Music video
- "Rescue Me" on YouTube

"Rescue Me" is a song by American band OneRepublic, released as the lead single from their fifth studio album Human (2021) through Interscope Records and Mosley Music Group on May 17, 2019.

== Promotion ==
The band announced the single on May 14, sharing a clip of a boy looking at a large waterfall before "eerie" music plays as the release date is shown.

== Music video ==
The music video shows a young boy, the protagonist, being chased by a group of bullies older than him. When he seems to have no escape, he begins to dance and discovers that he has powers, which he will use to overcome them.

It was directed by Christian Lamb and choreographed by Sherri Silver and was shot in Silverton, Oregon. It features Cody Bingham from Dancing with the Stars: Juniors as the young boy.

The music video was released on May 17, 2019, the same day as the song itself and currently has almost 140 million views (as of December 2022).

== Charts ==
=== Weekly charts ===
2019 weekly chart performance for "Rescue Me"
Chart (2019)	Peak position
Australia (ARIA)	26
Austria (Ö3 Austria Top 40)	17
Belgium (Ultratop 50 Flanders)	27
Belgium (Ultratop 50 Wallonia)	13
Canada Hot 100 (Billboard)	58
Canada Hot AC (Billboard)	36
Czech Republic Airplay (ČNS IFPI)	8
Czech Republic Singles Digital (ČNS IFPI)	12
France (SNEP)	106
Germany (GfK)	24
Greece International (IFPI)	38
Hungary (Rádiós Top 40)	32
Hungary (Single Top 40)	20
Hungary (Stream Top 40)	11
Ireland (IRMA)	23
Italy (FIMI)	44
Latvia (LaIPA)	16
Lithuania (AGATA)	11
Netherlands (Dutch Top 40)	33
Netherlands (Single Top 100)	71
New Zealand (Recorded Music NZ)	22
Norway (VG-lista)	30
Poland Airplay (ZPAV)	27
Portugal (AFP)	71
San Marino (SMRRTV Top 50)	36
Scotland Singles (Official Charts)	67
Singapore (RIAS)	20
Slovakia Singles Digital (ČNS IFPI)	18
Slovenia (SloTop50)	41
Sweden (Sverigetopplistan)	31
Switzerland (Schweizer Hitparade)	21
Ukraine Airplay (TopHit)	198
UK Singles (Official Charts)	52
US Bubbling Under Hot 100 (Billboard)	5
US Adult Pop Airplay (Billboard)	14
US Digital Song Sales (Billboard)	11
US Pop Airplay (Billboard)	29

2024 weekly chart performance for "Rescue Me"
Chart (2024)	Peak position
Estonia Airplay (TopHit)	81

=== Monthly charts ===
Monthly chart performance for "Rescue Me"
Chart (2019)	Peak position
Czech Republic (Rádio Top 100)	9
Czech Republic (Singles Digitál Top 100)	10
Slovakia (Singles Digitál Top 100)	21

=== Year-end charts ===
2019 year-end chart performance for "Rescue Me"
Chart (2019)	Position
Australia (ARIA)	97
Austria (Ö3 Austria Top 40)	30
Belgium (Ultratop Flanders)	78
Belgium (Ultratop Wallonia)	67
Germany (Official German Charts)	59
Latvia (LaIPA)	52
Switzerland (Schweizer Hitparade)	40
UK Cross Rhythms Annual Chart	17
US Adult Top 40 (Billboard)	44

2021 year-end chart performance for "Rescue Me"
Chart (2021)	Position
Hungary (Rádiós Top 40)	67

2024 year-end chart performance for "Rescue Me"
Chart (2024)	Position
Estonia Airplay (TopHit)	131

== Certifications ==
Region	Certification	Certified units/sales
Australia (ARIA)	3× Platinum	210,000^{‡}
Austria (IFPI Austria)	2× Platinum	60,000^{‡}
Belgium (BRMA)	Gold	20,000^{‡}
Brazil (Pro-Música Brasil)	2× Platinum	80,000^{‡}
Canada (Music Canada)	Gold	40,000^{‡}
Denmark (IFPI Danmark)	Platinum	90,000^{‡}
France (SNEP)	Platinum	200,000^{‡}
Germany (BVMI)	Gold	200,000^{‡}
Italy (FIMI)	Platinum	50,000^{‡}
New Zealand (RMNZ)	2× Platinum	60,000^{‡}
Poland (ZPAV)	Platinum	20,000^{‡}
Portugal (AFP)	Platinum	10,000^{‡}
Spain (Promusicae)	Gold	30,000^{‡}
United Kingdom (BPI)	Silver	200,000^{‡}
United States (RIAA)	Platinum	1,000,000^{‡}
^{‡} Sales+streaming figures based on certification alone.

== Release history ==
Region	Date	Format	Version	Label	Ref.
Various	May 17, 2019	Digital download; streaming	Original	Interscope	
Italy	June 7, 2019	Contemporary hit radio	Original	Universal	
Various	July 5, 2019	Digital download; streaming	Acoustic	Interscope	
United States	July 23, 2019	Contemporary hit radio	Original	Interscope	
Various	August 2, 2019	Digital download; streaming	BUNT. Remix	Interscope	
