= Feel Again =

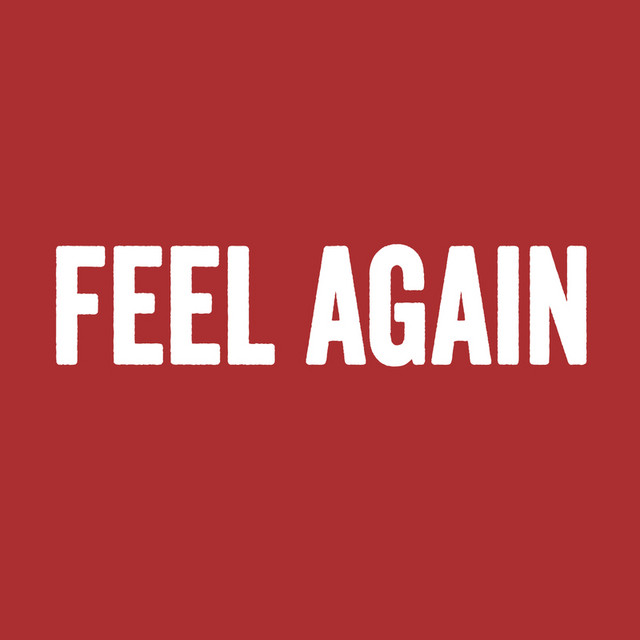

Single by OneRepublic

from the album Native
- Released: August 3, 2012
- Recorded: 2012
- Genre: Gospel rock
- Length: 3:05
- Label: Mosley; Interscope
- Songwriters: Ryan Tedder; Brent Kutzle; Drew Brown; Noel Zancanella
- Producers: Tedder; Kutzle; Zancanella; Brown

OneRepublic singles chronology
"Good Life" (2010)	"Feel Again" (2012)	"If I Lose Myself" (2013)

"Feel Again" is a song recorded by American rock band OneRepublic for their third studio album Native (2013). It was released as the lead single from the album on August 3, 2012. It was written and produced by Ryan Tedder, Brent Kutzle, Drew Brown, and Noel Zancanella.

"Feel Again" talks about coming back into your own and embracing life, as well as, transforming from "a lonely soul" to a man who is able to love again. It received positive reviews from music critics, who called it "wonderfully catchy" and that it would make a brilliant sing-along at larger festivals. Some critics compared the song to Florence + the Machine's "Dog Days Are Over". The song was mildly successful in North America, peaking at number 36 on the Billboard Hot 100; however, it saw most of its success in Europe, particularly Germany where it peaked at number 9 on the Media Control Charts.

A portion of the proceeds from the sales of the single will be donated to Save the Children's Every Beat Matters campaign to support training frontline health workers around the world.

== Release ==
"Feel Again" was unveiled on ABC's Good Morning America, on August 10, 2012, and on August 22 the group released an audio stream for everyone to listen the track. The single was also delivered to radio on August 22, and the song was released to iTunes on August 27. A portion of the proceeds from the sales of the single will be donated to Save the Children's Every Beat Matters campaign to support training frontline health workers around the world. The song was also heavily featured in the trailers for the 2013 film The Spectacular Now. It is also featured as the 14th track on NOW That's What I Call Music! 45.

== Writing and inspiration ==
"Feel Again" was written by Ryan Tedder, Brent Kutzle, Drew Brown and Noel Zancanella, while production was handled by Tedder. Tedder revealed that last year he was inspired by gospel melodies and harmonies. "The song itself was kind of a departure for anything we've ever done before on every level," Tedder said. "It's very much an uptempo song and has a lot of gospel influence in it." "For whatever reason that's something that was resonating with me and I felt that I really wanted to shift as many of our songs into that vibe as possible," he said.

Tedder said their partnership with Save the Children was serendipitous and it actually helped him finish the lyrics to the song.

"Initially we just had the beginning of a song. Save the Children came along and it coincided with another thought that we had as a band which was on this album to really focus on doing stuff that actually served a greater purpose other than just putting out another song. The process of trying to get hits or constantly keep up with the Joneses, after a certain point it's like, 'Wait. Why are we doing this?'. The Save the Children program added a serious amount of gravity to what we were doing and the amount of kids that we would be helping with donating proceeds from the sale of the single. It also helped me finish the lyrics. I actually had some kind of direction and weight."

== Composition ==
"Feel Again" (2012)
An 18 second sample of "Feel Again", where Ryan sings about transforming from "a lonely soul" to a man who is able to love again, over hand-clapping beats.

"Feel Again" is an up-tempo song, featuring an uplifting, hook-laden melody filled with hope and optimism. It showcases a richer, fuller sound palette that accentuates the anthemic qualities of their songwriting. The uplifting, emotional song contains similar catchy melodies to their past work, such as "Good Life", "Stop and Stare", "Apologize" and "All the Right Moves".

The song's emotional pull is given a massive boost by its powerful lyrics about coming back into your own and embracing life. "Heart still beating but it's not working. I reach out trying to love but I feel nothing," Tedder aches before bursting into the melodic chorus that is filled with bliss, "But with you I feel again." The hand-clap song is ultimately a tale about grabbing life by the horns and feeling new again no matter what happened the day prior. In the chorus, Tedder sings about transforming from "a lonely soul" to a man who is able to love again; "I'm feeling better since you know me/I was a lonely soul but that's the old me."

== Critical reception ==
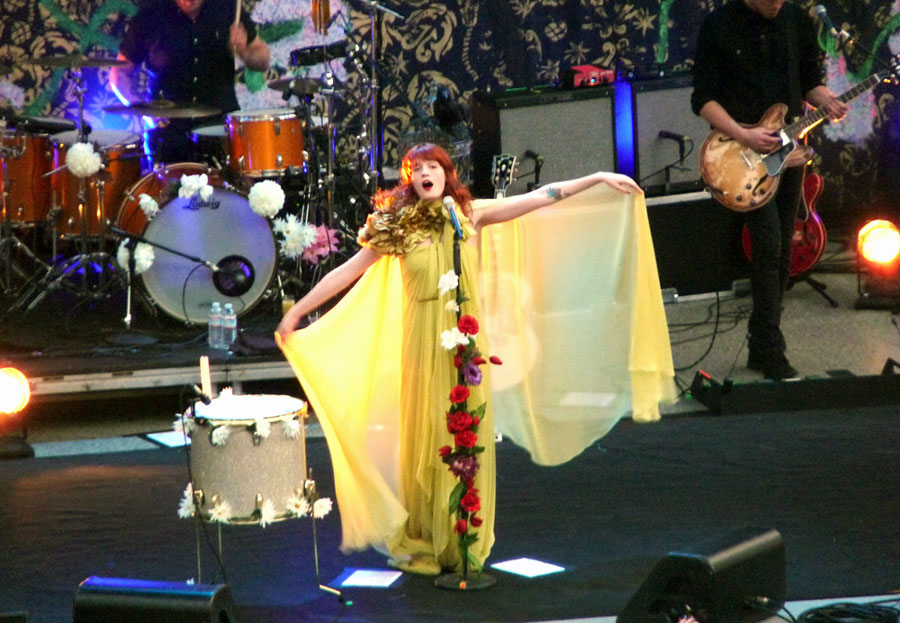
Some critics noted that "Feel Again" sounds similar to Florence + the Machine's "Dog Days Are Over".

The song received a favorable reception from music critics. Arjan Writers gave a very positive review for the track, stating that "Feel Again represents everything fans have come to love about the group, it clearly demonstrates that the group is evolving their brand of pop." The review further added: "In world saturated by bleak news headlines, conveying a message of living life in the moment is a timeless concept that truly has a universal appeal. And leave it up to Tedder and his friends to package such a powerful sentiment in a tightly-produced and radio-ready package that has the potential to spread like wildfire." Sam Wilbur of AOL Radio followed the same thought, writing, "The single is destined to be a top radio hit and a live favorite, with its hand-clapping beats and enjoyable chorus." Huw Hopkins of Alt Sounds commented, "The main chorus melody is wonderfully catchy and would make a brilliant sing-along at larger festivals. There is a certain soul to the voice of Ryan Tedder, but the production skills and teamwork of Zach Filkins adds an extra kick on the choral backing vocals."

Some critics realized that the track is very similar to Florence + the Machine songs. Scott Shetler of Pop Crush gave the song 3 out of 5 stars, writing that "With its urgent hand-clapping and swelling vocal hooks, 'Feel Again' sounds so similar to 'Dog Days Are Over' that the band might as well add a 'Featuring Florence + the Machine' credit." Shetler also said that "Though 'Feel Again' is far from original, the optimistic message and those 'woo-ooh-ooh' chants are hard to resist." Christina Lee of Idolator also noticed a Florence and the Machine influence, writing "Perhaps it's the handclaps. Perhaps it's the booming drums. Perhaps it's Ryan Tedder's hopeful tone, or the way his voice builds, collapses and then surges again without ever sounding defeated. Regardless, OneRepublic's new single, reminds us a lot of Florence + The Machine's breakout single 'Dog Days Are Over'. And that's not a bad thing."

== Music video ==
The music video was filmed in a redwood forest near San Francisco, California from July 31, 2012 to August 2, 2012. It premiered on Vevo on August 28, 2012. The video begins with Ryan Tedder walking over leafy ground in front of a beautiful sunset in the San Francisco Bay area. He stoops to pick up a glowing yellow ball. He then sees what appears to be a string of yellow lights. There is a shot of Ryan following the lights, then the video cuts to alternating shots of the band with strings of lights in the background, and different people dancing to the music. He is shown with the yellow ball in his heart, glowing through his clothes, and suggesting he had lost his heart or it had been broken, and he had regained it. The video cuts with an aerial view of the forest, and the sun rising.

Carl Williot of Idolator wrote a positive review, commenting, "The hypercolor lights complement the effervescence and effortlessness of Tedder's voice, and the total package is bright, it's colorful, it's earthy. Like a delicious music video salad." Amy Sciarretto of Pop Crush commented: "'Feel Again' won't wow you with spectacular graphics but it what it will do is allow you to concentrate on the song, which is slated to appear on the band's upcoming third studio album. Perhaps that was OneRepublic's intention by selecting this no frills treatment for the first visual taste of their next record. It was an effective strategy since it reeled us in hook, line and sinker."

== In other media ==
- The song was used in promotions for the Seven Network's 2013 revamp of its public affairs show Today Tonight.
- In 2026, the song was used in advertisements for Dupixent.

== Track listing ==
- Digital download
1. "Feel Again" – 3:05
- CD single
1. "Feel Again" (album version) – 3:05
2. "Feel Again" (Tai remix) – 5:33

== Charts ==
=== Weekly charts ===
Chart (2012–13)	Peak position
Austria (Ö3 Austria Top 40)	19
Belgium (Ultratop 50 Flanders)	17
Canada Hot 100 (Billboard)	59
Canada CHR/Top 40 (Billboard)	41
Canada Hot AC (Billboard)	29
Germany (GfK)	9
Luxembourg (Billboard)	7
Slovakia Airplay (ČNS IFPI)	35
Switzerland (Schweizer Hitparade)	34
US Billboard Hot 100	36
US Adult Alternative Airplay (Billboard)	19
US Adult Contemporary (Billboard)	26
US Adult Pop Airplay (Billboard)	8
US Pop Airplay (Billboard)	19

=== Year-end charts ===
Chart (2012)	Position
Germany (Media Control AG)	99
US Adult Top 40 (Billboard)	50

== Certifications ==
Region	Certification	Certified units/sales
Australia (ARIA)	Gold	35,000^{‡}
Canada (Music Canada)	Gold	40,000^{*}
Germany (BVMI)	Gold	150,000^{‡}
Sweden (GLF)	Gold	20,000^{‡}
United States (RIAA)	2× Platinum	1,000,000
^{*} Sales figures based on certification alone.^{‡} Sales+streaming figures based on certification alone.

== Release history ==
Release dates and formats for "Feel Again"
Region	Date	Format	Label	Ref.
Italy	August 3, 2012	Radio impact	Universal	
Germany	October 5, 2012	CD single	Universal	
