= Human (OneRepublic album) =

Studio album by OneRepublic
- Released: August 27, 2021
- Recorded: 2019–2021
- Genres: Pop; pop rock; electropop
- Length: 34:51
- Labels: Mosley; Interscope
- Producers: Ryan Tedder; Brent Kutzle; Tyler Spry; Steve Wilmot; John Nathaniel; Zach Skelton

OneRepublic studio album chronology
Oh My My (2016)	Human (2021)	Artificial Paradise (2024)

Singles from Human
- 1. "Rescue Me" Released: May 17, 2019; 2. "Wanted" Released: September 6, 2019; 3. "Didn't I" Released: March 13, 2020; 4. "Better Days" Released: March 25, 2020; 5. "Lose Somebody" Released: May 15, 2020; 6. "Run" Released: May 5, 2021; 7. "Someday" Released: August 27, 2021

Human is the fifth studio album by American pop rock band OneRepublic. It was released through Mosley Music Group and Interscope Records on August 27, 2021, over four years after their fourth album Oh My My (2016), marking this their longest gap between studio releases in the band's existence. After the health issues that affected the band's lead singer, songwriter and producer Ryan Tedder, OneRepublic decided to work on a standalone singles strategy to promote the album. With that, Human deals with lyrical themes surrounding the COVID-19 pandemic, as well as life and the connectivity between humanity and nature.

Human includes electronic production consisting of drum machines, synthesizers and manipulated vocals. In addition to the band's own Tedder and Brent Kutzle, OneRepublic recruited producers Steve Wilmot and Zach Skelton, who worked on the band's previous album, as well as producers Tyler Spry and John Nathaniel.

Six singles supported the album: "Rescue Me", "Wanted", "Didn't I", "Better Days", "Run", "Someday" also including the singles "Lose Somebody" and "Wild Life", released as bonus tracks on the digital deluxe edition of the album. "Somebody to Love" preceded the album as a promotional single. The album polarized music critics, who admired the lyricism and composition of some tracks, but were divided over the overproduced vocals, opaque production, and the excess of rap-trap verses and melodies in much of the songs.

After a period of delays, Human peaked at number 11 on the Billboard 200 in its debut week, falling below the debut weeks of Native (2013) and Oh My My (2016) but surpassing Dreaming Out Loud (2007) and Waking Up (2009). The album also reached the top twenty in Australia, Austria, Belgium, Canada, Germany, New Zealand, Scotland, and Switzerland.

== Background ==
The album was announced by frontman Ryan Tedder in September 2019, with a planned release in "late November" of that year. Tedder stated that he wanted to put out an album with eight or nine songs and then continue releasing new music in 2020. Tedder later revealed that the album had been delayed until the second quarter of 2020 because it was "physically impossible to finish an album in the timeframe that we thought we needed it", and he believed the album would not be successful if released between Thanksgiving and Christmas. Tedder also said the band had "two years worth of songs just scattered on hard drives" and were trying to find and finish "the best ones" to make "a coherent album out of the last two years". Tedder stated that the May 8 release date was delayed because of it being a "weird time", amid the COVID-19 pandemic. The band also stated, "due to the current circumstances requiring us to distance ourselves from each other and you, the release has been postponed." On July 1, 2021, the band announced via their Instagram account that the official release date for Human would be August 27, 2021.

== Singles ==
The lead single "Rescue Me" was released on May 17, 2019, and reached number five on the US Billboard Bubbling Under Hot 100. "Wanted" was released as the second single on September 6, 2019, and reached number nine on the Bubbling Under Hot 100. The third single "Didn't I" was released alongside the album pre-order on March 13, 2020, and reached number 19 on the Bubbling Under Hot 100. "Better Days" was released as the fourth single on March 25, 2020. "Run" was released as the fifth single on May 5, 2021, and reached number 11 on the Bubbling Under Hot 100. "Someday" was released as the sixth single on August 27, 2021, along with the album's release.

=== Promotional single ===
The album also includes the promotional single "Somebody to Love", released on September 11, 2019. It was written by songwriter JT Roach on the series Songland, on which Tedder serves as a judge.

=== Other songs ===
"Lose Somebody", a collaboration with Kygo, was released on May 15, 2020, and reached number 88 on the US Billboard Hot 100. It appears on Kygo's third studio album Golden Hour. "Wild Life" was released on September 25, 2020, for the soundtrack of the 2020 film Clouds. Both songs only appear on the deluxe edition of Human.

== Critical reception ==
Professional ratings
Review scores
Source	Rating
AllMusic	3.5/5 stars
Vinyl Chapters	3.5/5 stars
The Young Folks	7/10

Human received mixed reviews from music critics. Much of it was divided on Tedder's production and vocals on several tracks, while the lyricism and melodies were praised on certain tracks and received negatively on others due to the excess of rap-trap verses.

Neil Z. Yeung of AllMusic called the album proof that OneRepublic are still the "masters of the galloping, upbeat pop anthem, packing whistles, handclaps, throbbing basslines, and dance beats into every second of a song" but also mentions that "by including tracks that have been around since 2019, much of the effort feels like a time capsule of days gone by (especially in such an ever-changing genre) and, in a harsher sense, of dated material that can sound out of place when presented as a whole vision years later". Vinyl Chapters' Zoë Andrea-Lykourgou wrote that "Human is a solid album that starts and ends considerably strongly. It's relatively easy to listen to and, whilst the quality does vary in places, there are more than a few powerful tracks that keep the listener interested throughout".

== Track listing ==
Standard edition
No.	Title	Writer(s)	Producer(s)	Length
1.	"Run"	Ryan Tedder; Brent Kutzle; John Nathaniel; Tyler Spry	Tedder; Kutzle; Nathaniel; Spry	2:48
2.	"Distance"	Tedder; Casey Smith; Jason Evigan; Mathieu Jomphe-Lepine	Evigan; Billboard; Tedder; Kutzle^{[b]}; Nathaniel^{[b]}; Spry^{[b]}	3:00
3.	"Someday"	Tedder; Kutzle; Spry; Steven Mudd; Josh Varnadore	Kutzle; Spry; Nathaniel^{[b]}	3:07
4.	"Didn't I"	Tedder; Kutzle; Zach Skelton; James Abrahart; Kyrre Gørvell-Dahll	Tedder; Kutzle; Nathaniel^{[a]}	3:27
5.	"Rescue Me"	Tedder; Kutzle	Tedder; Kutzle; Spry^{[a]}	2:39
6.	"Savior"	Tedder; Kutzle; Skelton	Kutzle; Spry; Tedder^{[a]}; Skelton^{[a]}	3:01
7.	"Take Care of You"	Tedder; Kutzle; Eddie Fisher; Nathaniel	Tedder; Kutzle; Nathaniel	3:48
8.	"Forgot About You"	Tedder; Louis Bell; Andrew Watt; Ali Tamposi; Nick Mira	Tedder; Watt; Bell; Mira	2:53
9.	"Somebody to Love"	Tedder; Kutzle; Shane McAnally; Ester Dean; Andrew Wells; Jintae Ko; JT Roach; Andrew DeRoberts	Tedder; Kutzle; Nathaniel; DeRoberts; Spry^{[b]}	3:01
10.	"Wanted"	Tedder; Smith; Kutzle; Skelton; Spry	Tedder; Kutzle; Spry; Steve Wilmot^{[b]}	2:16
11.	"Take It Out on Me"	Tedder; Julia Michaels; Michael Tucker	Tedder; Kutzle; Spry^{[b]}; BloodPop^{[b]}; Brian Willett^{[b]}	2:27
12.	"Better Days"	Tedder; Kutzle; Nathaniel	Tedder; Kutzle; Nathaniel; Spry^{[a]}	2:24
Total length:				34:51

Physical and digital standard editions
No.	Title	Writer(s)	Producer(s)	Length
13.	"Lose Somebody" (with Kygo)	Tedder; Gørvell-Dahll; Philip Plestedl; Jacob Torrey; Morten Ristorp; Alexander Delicata; Alysa Vanderheym	Gørvell-Dahll; Rissi^{[a]}; Alex Delicata^{[a]}; Alysa Vanderheym^{[a]}	3:19
Total length:				38:10

Digital deluxe edition bonus tracks
No.	Title	Writer(s)	Producer(s)	Length
13.	"Wild Life"	Tedder; Kutzle; Nathaniel	Kutzle; Nathaniel	4:27
14.	"Ships + Tides"	Tedder; Kutzle; Noel Zancanella	Kutzle; Brandon Collins	4:56
15.	"Someday" (acoustic)	Tedder; Kutzle; Spry; Mudd; Varnadore	Kutzle; Spry	3:05
16.	"Lose Somebody" (with Kygo)	Tedder; Gørvell-Dahll; Philip Plestedl; Jacob Torrey; Morten Ristorp; Alexander Delicata; Alysa Vanderheym	Gørvell-Dahll; Rissi^{[a]}; Alex Delicata^{[a]}; Alysa Vanderheym^{[a]}	3:19
Total length:				50:36

US Target and international physical deluxe edition bonus tracks
No.	Title	Writer(s)	Producer(s)	Length
13.	"Wild Life"	Tedder; Kutzle; Nathaniel	Kutzle; Nathaniel	4:27
14.	"Ships"	Tedder; Kutzle; Zancanella	Kutzle; Collins	3:11
15.	"Tides"	Kutzle; Collins	Kutzle; Collins	1:43
16.	"Run" (acoustic)	Tedder; Kutzle; Nathaniel; Spry	Loren Ferard; Kutzle	2:48
17.	"Someday" (acoustic)	Tedder; Kutzle; Spry; Mudd; Varnadore	Kutzle; Spry^{[b]}	3:05
18.	"Lose Somebody" (with Kygo)	Tedder; Gørvell-Dahll; Philip Plestedl; Jacob Torrey; Morten Ristorp; Alexander Delicata; Alysa Vanderheym	Gørvell-Dahll; Rissi^{[a]}; Alex Delicata^{[a]}; Alysa Vanderheym^{[a]}	3:19
Total length:				53:24

Italian deluxe and Japanese edition bonus tracks
No.	Title	Writer(s)	Producer(s)	Length
13.	"Wild Life"	Tedder; Kutzle; Nathaniel	Kutzle; Nathaniel	4:27
14.	"Ships"	Tedder; Kutzle; Zancanella	Kutzle; Collins	3:11
15.	"Tides"	Kutzle; Collins	Kutzle; Collins	1:43
16.	"Run" (acoustic)	Tedder; Kutzle; Nathaniel; Spry	Loren Ferard; Kutzle	2:48
17.	"Someday" (acoustic)	Tedder; Kutzle; Spry; Mudd; Varnadore	Kutzle; Spry^{[b]}	3:05
18.	"Better Days (Giorni Migliori)" (with Negramaro)	Tedder; Giuliano Sangiorgi; Kutzle; Nathaniel; Spry	Tedder; Kutzle; Nathaniel; Spry^{[a]}	2:24
19.	"Lose Somebody" (with Kygo)	Tedder; Gørvell-Dahll; Philip Plestedl; Jacob Torrey; Morten Ristorp; Alexander Delicata; Alysa Vanderheym	Gørvell-Dahll; Rissi^{[a]}; Alex Delicata^{[a]}; Alysa Vanderheym^{[a]}	3:19
Total length:				55:48

Latin edition bonus tracks
No.	Title	Writer(s)	Producer(s)	Length
13.	"Wild Life"	Tedder; Kutzle; Nathaniel	Kutzle; Nathaniel	4:27
14.	"Ships"	Tedder; Kutzle; Zancanella	Kutzle; Collins	3:11
15.	"Tides"	Kutzle; Collins	Kutzle; Collins	1:43
16.	"Run" (Latin version; with Mariah Angeliq)	Tedder; Angeliq; Kutzle; Nathaniel; Spry	Tedder; Kutzle; Nathaniel; Spry	2:16
17.	"Someday" (acoustic)	Tedder; Kutzle; Spry; Mudd; Varnadore	Kutzle; Spry^{[b]}	3:05
18.	"Better Days (Mejores Días)" (with Khea)	Tedder; Ivo Alfredo Thomas Serue; Kutzle; Nathaniel; Spry	Tedder; Kutzle; Nathaniel; Spry^{[a]}	2:24
19.	"Lose Somebody" (with Kygo)	Tedder; Gørvell-Dahll; Philip Plestedl; Jacob Torrey; Morten Ristorp; Alexander Delicata; Alysa Vanderheym	Gørvell-Dahll; Rissi^{[a]}; Alex Delicata^{[a]}; Alysa Vanderheym^{[a]}	3:19
Total length:				55:16

Notes

- ^{^[a]} signifies a co-producer
- ^{^[b]} signifies an additional producer

== Charts ==
=== Weekly charts ===
Weekly chart performance for Human
Chart (2021)	Peak position
Australian Albums (ARIA)	10
Austrian Albums (Ö3 Austria)	7
Belgian Albums (Ultratop Flanders)	14
Belgian Albums (Ultratop Wallonia)	19
Canadian Albums (Billboard)	12
Czech Albums (ČNS IFPI)	34
Dutch Albums (Album Top 100)	20
Finnish Albums (Suomen virallinen lista)	45
French Albums (SNEP)	39
German Albums (Offizielle Top 100)	8
Hungarian Albums (MAHASZ)	35
Irish Albums (IRMA)	83
Italian Albums (FIMI)	15
Japan Hot Albums (Billboard Japan)	56
Japanese Albums (Oricon)	89
Lithuanian Albums (AGATA)	16
New Zealand Albums (RMNZ)	14
Norwegian Albums (VG-lista)	15
Polish Albums (ZPAV)	31
Portuguese Albums (AFP)	17
Scottish Albums (Official Charts)	13
Slovak Albums (IFPI)	21
Spanish Albums (Promusicae)	24
Swedish Albums (Sverigetopplistan)	54
Swiss Albums (Schweizer Hitparade)	3
Swiss Albums (Romandy)	1
UK Albums (Official Charts)	30
US Billboard 200	11

=== Year-end charts ===
2021 year-end chart performance for Human
Chart (2021)	Position
US Top Current Album Sales (Billboard)	189

== Certifications ==
Certifications for Human
Region	Certification	Certified units/sales
Belgium (BRMA)	Gold	10,000^{‡}
Brazil (Pro-Música Brasil)	Platinum	40,000^{‡}
Italy (FIMI)	Gold	25,000^{‡}
New Zealand (RMNZ)	Gold	7,500^{‡}
Poland (ZPAV)	Gold	10,000^{‡}
Switzerland (IFPI Switzerland)	Platinum	20,000^{‡}
United States (RIAA)	Gold	500,000^{‡}
^{‡} Sales+streaming figures based on certification alone.
