= Greg Mellott =

Greg Mellott is best known for winning an Emmy for the 2008 documentary Dream No Little Dream on the life of Robert S. Kerr, which he wrote and directed.

Mellott also wrote and directed The Grand Energy Transition, a documentary on the book of the same name written by Robert Hefner III, which covers energy, natural gas, and his life story. Mellott works alongside Jackie Chan and David Chan, producer of Teenage Mutant Ninja Turtles. Mellott produced the 2016 internationally televised film Behind the Water with activist Fraser Kershaw.
