= Brent Kutzle =

American musician (born 1985)

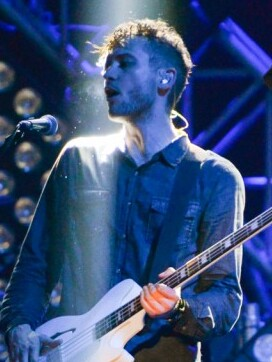

Background information
- Born: Brent Michael Kutzle; August 3, 1985 (age 41); Fountain Valley, California, U.S.
- Genres: Pop rock; pop; alternative rock
- Occupations: Musician; multi-instrumentalist; songwriter; record producer; film composer
- Instruments: Bass; cello; vocals; piano; keyboards; guitar; percussion
- Years active: 2007–present
- Member of: OneRepublic
- Website: onerepublic.com

Brent Michael Kutzle (born August 3, 1985) is an American musician, multi-instrumentalist, songwriter, record producer, and film composer originating from Fountain Valley, California. He is the bassist and cellist for the pop rock band OneRepublic.

Much like OneRepublic's lead vocalist, Ryan Tedder, Brent has also written and performed with various other musicians from both underground music scenes and mainstream acts, including Beyoncé, Matchbox Twenty, Ellie Goulding, Cobra Starship, Leona Lewis, Kelly Clarkson, ísland, Vermeer, Augustine, This Allure, Monarch, Venus Infers, Jessica Dobson, and Kevin Max. Brent has been married to Jackie Leslie since 2017.

== Biography ==
=== Early life ===
He attended Ethan B. Allen Elementary and when Kutzle was thirteen, he attended Sarah McGarvin School located in Westminster, California. He also attended La Quinta High School in Westminster, California Baptist University in Riverside and Vanguard University in Costa Mesa. Kutzle began playing piano at an early age with his mother a church organist and piano teacher, and his father a pianist and one of 84 pianists in the Los Angeles 1984 Summer Olympics opening ceremonies. Kutzle was encouraged by his father to take on a second instrument, the cello, because the competition is far less than that of violin. Kutzle is a classically trained composer.

=== Filmography ===
Kutzle has a cameo appearance in the 2008 film, The Eye, starring Jessica Alba. He appears in the opening scene playing cello as a member of the orchestra. He can also be heard playing cello on the title track, "Songs Like Rain" for the 2006 independent film of the same name. In 2014, Kutzle was asked by the Jamaican diaspora about how many instruments he could play regarding film and he stated, “Not as many as I could in college, but somewhere around a handful.” Kutzle scored a soundtrack for the 2016 international feature film Behind the Water which stars activist Fraser Kershaw.

=== OneRepublic ===
Kutzle joined OneRepublic early in 2007 after the band's former bassist left to pursue a solo career. He has played the cello since fourth grade and has commented that he would never play for a band that 'would not let him play his cello'. Kutzle has transformed the sound of the cello for a rock band by using delay, reverb and looping effects. He made his mark on OneRepublic's debut album Dreaming Out Loud on the track "All Fall Down", which is based on a cello hook that is repeated throughout the whole track.

In addition to playing the cello and the bass guitar, Kutzle, along with guitarist Zach Filkins, also aids friend and frontman, Ryan Tedder, in songwriting and composing music for the band. Many of the songs on the band's second album Waking Up were co-written and co-produced by Kutzle, including the lead single "All The Right Moves" and the single "Good Life", as well as "Feel Again" and "If I Lose Myself" which are both singles from their third album Native. At live concerts, he can be seen playing bass guitar, cello, and singing background vocals alongside Filkins, drummer Eddie Fisher and guitarist Drew Brown.

== Discography ==
- Dreaming Out Loud (2007)
- Waking Up (2009)
- Native (2013)
- Oh My My (2016)
- Human (2021)
- One Night in Malibu (2022)
- Artificial Paradise (2024)
