= 16th Annual Honda Civic Tour =

2017 concert tour by OneRepublic

- Tour by Honda Civic Tour
- Location: Asia; North America
- Associated album: Oh My My
- Start date: July 7, 2017
- End date: September 27, 2017
- Legs: 2
- No. of shows: 50
- Supporting acts: Fitz and the Tantrums; James Arthur
- Website: civictour.honda.com

Honda Civic Tour concert chronology
- Future Now Tour (2016); 16th Annual Honda Civic Tour (2017); Voicenotes Tour (2018)
OneRepublic tour chronology
Native Tour (2013–15)	16th Annual Honda Civic Tour (2017)	Live in Concert (2022)

The 16th Annual Honda Civic Tour was a concert tour headlined by American rock band OneRepublic. Sponsored by Honda and produced by Marketing Factory, the tour also featured Fitz and the Tantrums and James Arthur. The tour began on July 7, 2017 in Kansas City and concluded on September 27, 2017 in Shanghai.

== Background ==
The band announced that they would headline the 16th Annual Honda Civic Tour. In an Instagram video, frontman Ryan Tedder stated:

"Our best memories come from summer tours in the U.S. and the Honda Civic tour has been the benchmark of summer tours. It's going to be a set list that we've never attempted before, it's going to be production we've never attempted before... and it's going to be the most interactive tour we've ever done before."

== Set list ==
This set list is representative of the show on July 7, 2017, in Kansas City. It is not representative of all concerts for the duration of the tour.

1. "Stop and Stare"
2. "Secrets"
3. "Kids"
4. "Good Life"
5. "Wherever I Go"
6. "Better"
7. "Feel Again"
8. "Halo" / "Happier"
9. "Come Home"
10. "I Lived"
11. "Let's Hurt Tonight"
12. "All the Right Moves"
13. "No Vacancy"
14. "Apologize"
15. "Rich Love"
16. "If I Lose Myself"

Encore

17. "Counting Stars"
18. "Rumour Has It" (with Fitz and the Tantrums and James Arthur)
19. "Love Runs Out"

== Tour dates ==
List of concerts, showing date, city, country, venue, opening acts, tickets sold, number of available tickets and amount of gross revenue
Date	City	Country	Venue	Opening acts	Attendance	Revenue
North America
July 7, 2017	Kansas City	United States	Sprint Center	Fitz and the Tantrums; James Arthur	5,650 / 5,650 (100%)	$491,467
July 8, 2017	Maryland Heights	United States	Hollywood Casino Amphitheatre	Fitz and the Tantrums	17,579 / 19,486 (90%)	$835,455
July 10, 2017	Nashville	United States	Ascend Amphitheater	James Arthur	6,087 / 6,894 (88%)	$231,456
July 11, 2017	Cincinnati	United States	Riverbend Music Center	Fitz and the Tantrums; James Arthur	—N/a	—N/a
July 13, 2017	Noblesville	United States	Klipsch Music Center	Fitz and the Tantrums; James Arthur	22,481 / 23,402 (96%)	$1,273,217
July 14, 2017	Highland Park	United States	Ravinia Pavilion	Fitz and the Tantrums; James Arthur	—N/a	—N/a
July 15, 2017	Highland Park	United States	Ravinia Pavilion	Fitz and the Tantrums; James Arthur	—N/a	—N/a
July 18, 2017	Burgettstown	United States	KeyBank Pavilion	Fitz and the Tantrums; James Arthur	20,228 / 22,939 (88%)	$1,128,329
July 19, 2017	Clarkston	United States	DTE Energy Music Theatre	Fitz and the Tantrums; James Arthur	13,625 / 14,895 (91%)	$489,383
July 21, 2017	Bristow	United States	Jiffy Lube Live	Fitz and the Tantrums; James Arthur	—N/a	—N/a
July 22, 2017	Camden	United States	BB&T Pavilion	Fitz and the Tantrums; James Arthur	—N/a	—N/a
July 23, 2017	Virginia Beach	United States	Veterans United Home Loans Amphitheater	Fitz and the Tantrums; James Arthur	—N/a	—N/a
July 25, 2017	Darien	United States	Darien Lake Performing Arts Center	Fitz and the Tantrums; James Arthur	—N/a	—N/a
July 26, 2017	Scranton	United States	The Pavilion at Montage Mountain	Fitz and the Tantrums; James Arthur	—N/a	—N/a
July 28, 2017	Holmdel	United States	PNC Bank Arts Center	Fitz and the Tantrums; James Arthur	—N/a	—N/a
July 29, 2017	Wantagh	United States	Northwell Health at Jones Beach Theater	Fitz and the Tantrums; James Arthur	11,098 / 13,672 (81%)	$489,835
July 30, 2017	Atlantic City	United States	Borgata Event Center	—N/a	—N/a	—N/a
August 1, 2017	Saratoga Springs	United States	Saratoga Performing Arts Center	Fitz and the Tantrums; James Arthur	—N/a	—N/a
August 2, 2017	Hartford	United States	Xfinity Theatre	Fitz and the Tantrums; James Arthur	—N/a	—N/a
August 4, 2017	Mansfield	United States	Xfinity Center	Fitz and the Tantrums; James Arthur	—N/a	—N/a
August 5, 2017	Bangor	United States	Darling's Waterfront Pavilion	Fitz and the Tantrums; James Arthur	—N/a	—N/a
August 6, 2017	Gilford	United States	Bank of New Hampshire Pavilion	Fitz and the Tantrums; James Arthur	6,958 / 7,552 (92%)	$324,721
August 9, 2017 (Note: Not a Honda Civic Tour date.)	Quebec City	Canada	Videotron Centre	Fitz and the Tantrums; James Arthur	7,152 / 7,642 (94%)	$281,210
August 11, 2017	Montreal	Canada	Bell Centre	Fitz and the Tantrums; James Arthur	7,079 / 7,501 (94%)	$394,300
August 12, 2017	Toronto	Canada	Budweiser Stage	Fitz and the Tantrums; James Arthur	—N/a	—N/a
August 15, 2017	Winnipeg	Canada	Bell MTS Place	Fitz and the Tantrums; James Arthur	—N/a	—N/a
August 17, 2017	Saskatoon	Canada	SaskTel Centre	Fitz and the Tantrums; James Arthur	—N/a	—N/a
August 18, 2017	Edmonton	Canada	Rogers Place	Fitz and the Tantrums	—N/a	—N/a
August 19, 2017	Calgary	Canada	Scotiabank Saddledome	Fitz and the Tantrums	—N/a	—N/a
August 21, 2017	Vancouver	Canada	Rogers Arena	Fitz and the Tantrums	9,050 / 9,472 (96%)	$297,182
August 22, 2017	Auburn	United States	White River Amphitheatre	Fitz and the Tantrums; James Arthur	—N/a	—N/a
August 23, 2017	Ridgefield	United States	Sunlight Supply Amphitheater	Fitz and the Tantrums; James Arthur	—N/a	—N/a
August 25, 2017	Wheatland	United States	Toyota Amphitheatre	Fitz and the Tantrums; James Arthur	—N/a	—N/a
August 26, 2017	Mountain View	United States	Shoreline Amphitheatre	Fitz and the Tantrums; James Arthur	—N/a	—N/a
August 28, 2017	Concord	United States	Concord Pavilion	Fitz and the Tantrums; James Arthur	—N/a	—N/a
August 29, 2017	Phoenix	United States	Ak-Chin Pavilion		—N/a	—N/a
August 31, 2017	Inglewood	United States	The Forum	James Arthur	10,591 / 10,693 (99%)	$491,467
September 1, 2017	Chula Vista	United States	Mattress Firm Amphitheatre	Fitz and the Tantrums; James Arthur	—N/a	—N/a
September 2, 2017	Anaheim	United States	Honda Center	James Arthur	11,856 / 12,638 (94%)	$734,365
September 6, 2017	West Valley City	United States	USANA Amphitheatre	Fitz and the Tantrums; James Arthur	—N/a	—N/a
September 8, 2017	Greenwood Village	United States	Fiddler's Green Amphitheatre	—N/a	—N/a	—N/a
September 9, 2017	Greenwood Village	United States	Fiddler's Green Amphitheatre	—N/a	—N/a	—N/a
September 11, 2017	Dallas	United States	Starplex Pavilion	Fitz and the Tantrums; James Arthur	—N/a	—N/a
September 12, 2017	The Woodlands	United States	Cynthia Woods Mitchell Pavilion	Fitz and the Tantrums; James Arthur	—N/a	—N/a
Asia
September 15, 2017 (Note: The concert on September 15, 2017, in Singapore is part of the Formula 1 2017 Singapore Grand Prix.)	Singapore		Marina Bay Street Circuit	—N/a	—N/a	—N/a
September 17, 2017	Taipei	Taiwan	Nangang C3 Field	—N/a	—N/a	—N/a
September 19, 2017	Hong Kong		AsiaWorld–Arena	—N/a	—N/a	—N/a
September 21, 2017	Bangkok	Thailand	Impact Arena	—N/a	—N/a	—N/a
September 25, 2017	Tokyo	Japan	Zepp Tokyo	—N/a	—N/a	—N/a
September 27, 2017	Shanghai	China	Mercedes-Benz Arena	—N/a	—N/a	—N/a
Total					149,434 / 162,436 (92%)	$7,462,387
