= Bunt (DJ) =

German DJ (born 1994)

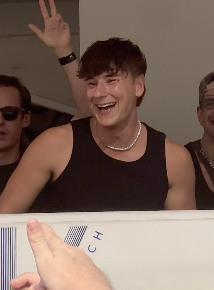
- BUNT. at LIV Beach in October 2025

Background information
- Born: Levi Wijk; January 3, 1994 (age 32); Stuttgart, Germany
- Genres: Electronic folk; folk house; deep house; techno; garage house
- Occupations: Record producer; DJ
- Years active: 2014–present
- Labels: Geffen; Arista
- Past members: Nico Crispin
- Website: buntmusic.com

Levi Wijk (born January 3, 1994), better known as Bunt (stylized as BUNT.), is a German country-folk DJ and record producer.

"Bunt" in the German language means "Colorful". Bunt was formerly a duo, which included Wijk and Nico Crispin; Crispin left the duo in May 2021. After Crispin left, Wijk signed to Arista records and released his most popular hit, "Clouds", featuring Nate Traveller and his album Renaissance. In 2024, he collaborated with Mapei to release "Trippin" on the album Levi Don't Do It.

== Biography ==
At age 15, Wijk was introduced to Swedish House Mafia by his brother via the video for the song "One".

In 2014, when they were students in college, Wijk and Crispin began collaborating.

In 2016, BUNT. released the song "Old Guitar" and "Young Hearts". At that time, the duo was signed to Interscope Management. In January 2019, they released "Oh My Other".

In 2020, They released singles "Unbreakable" featuring Clarence Coffee Jr., "Nights Like That" feat. Georgia Ku and "Crocodile Tears" feat. Jens Hult, with the former being a demo track that was performed by Avicii.

In 2021, Nico Crispin left the duo. In a 2025 interview, Wijk said that Crispin is no longer making music and runs a tennis brand of his own.

In February 2023, Wijk signed to Arista Records. And not long after that, he released "Clouds" featuring Nate Traveller.

On October 23, 2026, he released his debut studio album called “Levi Did It”.

== Musical style ==
BUNT's musical style is described as "electronic folk music" and noted to be heavily influenced by late electronic music pioneer Avicii along with influences from musicians such as Justice, Basement Jaxx, Swedish House Mafia and Calvin Harris with elements of Fred Again..

After becoming a solo artist, Wijk experimented with the deep house and stutter house genre. Starting with the single "Paperplanes" released back in 2022, he completely moved on from electronic folk genre since then.

== Discography ==
=== Studio albums ===
List of studio albums, with selected chart positions
Title	Details	Peak chart positions	
Title	Details	GER	AUT
Levi Did It	Released: 23 October 2026; Formats: CD, digital download, LP, streaming; Label: Arista, Sony Music	1	1

=== Singles ===
List of songs as lead artist, with the record label and year released
Title	Year	Album	Record Label	Ref.
As a duo (Levi Wijk & Nico Crispin)
"Journey" (featuring Emma Carn)	2014	Non-album single	Kontor Records	
"Pictures" (featuring Sarah Miles)	2014	Non-album single	Kontor Records	
"Harmonica"	2014	Non-album single	Kontor Records	
"Young Love" (featuring Emma Carn)	2015	Non-album single	Interscope Records	
"Coming Home" (featuring Sons of the East)	2016	Non-album single	Interscope Records	
"Young Hearts" (featuring BEGINNERS)	2016	Non-album single	Interscope Records	
"Old Guitar"	2016	Non-album single	Interscope Records	
"Take Me Home" (featuring Alexander Tidebrink)	2017	Non-album single	Interscope Records	
"On My Way" (featuring Leah Haywood)	2017	Non-album single	Interscope Records	
"Gypsy Heart" (featuring Neil Ormandy)	2017	Non-album single	Interscope Records	
"Little Secrets (featuring DamienDamien)	2018	Non-album single	Geffen Records	
"For You My Love" (featuring BEGINNERS)	2018	Non-album single	Geffen Records	
"Sure Don't Miss You" (featuring The Dip)	2019	Non-album single	Geffen Records	
"Oh My Other" (featuring Oliver Hazard)	2019	Non-album single	Geffen Records	
"Lucky Day" (featuring BEGINNER)	2019	Non-album single	Geffen Records	
"Cuba (Tiene Sabor)" (featuring Omara Portuondo)	2019	Non-album single	Geffen Records	
"Save My Mind" (featuring Benemy Slope)	2020	Non-album single	Geffen Records	
"Unbreakable" (featuring Clarence Coffee Jr.)	2020	Non-album single	Interscope Records	
"Nights Like That" (featuring Georgia Ku)	2020	Non-album single	Interscope Records	
"Crocodile Tears" (featuring Jens Hult)	2020	Non-album single	Interscope Records	
"Every Day Is A Song" (featuring Austin Jenckes)	2020	Non-album single	Interscope Records	
"Out of Time" (featuring Diviners & Tom Bailey)	2021	Non-album single	Interscope Records	
"Hurricane" (featuring Hon & SMBDY)	2021	Non-album single	Interscope Records	
"Old Guitar (Folktales)" (featuring Josiah and the Bonnevilles)	2022	Folktales	Tunecore	
"Young Hearts (Folktales)" (featuring BEGINNERS)	2022	Folktales	Tunecore	
"Take Me Home (Folktales)" (featuring Alexander Tidebrink)	2022	Folktales	Tunecore	
"On My Way (Folktales)" (featuring Leah Haywood)	2022	Folktales	Tunecore	
"Little Secrets (Folktales)" (featuring DamienDamien)	2022	Folktales	Tunecore	
"Gypsy Heart (Folktales)" (featuring Neil Ormandy)	2022	Folktales	Tunecore	
"Coming Home (Folktales)" (featuring Sons Of The East)	2022	Folktales	Tunecore	
"Kids" (featuring Deepend & Leo Stannard)	2022	Non-album single	Tunecore	
As a solo act (Levi Wijk)
"Paperplanes"	2022	Non-album single	Self-released	
"Clouds" (featuring Nate Traveller)	2023	Love, Renaissance and Levi Don’t Do It	Arista	
"Lost My Mind (Wake Up)" (with Elley Duhé)	2023	Love, Renaissance and Levi Don’t Do It	Arista	
"Lose It All (I Don't Wanna)"	2023	Love, Renaissance and Levi Don’t Do It	Arista	
"Love" (with Johan Lenox)	2023	Love, Renaissance and Levi Don’t Do It	Arista	
"Renaissance" (with VisionV)	2023	Renaissance	Arista	
"Peace In Silence" (with Nate Traveller)	2023	Levi Don’t Do It	Arista	
"Maybe" (with GRAHAM)	2024	Non-album single	Arista	
"Crown"	2024	Non-album single	Arista	
"You" (with Oaks)	2024	Non-album single	Arista	
"Only Friends"	2025	Non-album single	Arista	
"Best Day of My Life (BUNT's Version)" (with Tom Odell)	2025	Levi Did It	Arista	
"Crazy" (with Myles Lloyd)	2025	Non-album single	Arista	
"Spaces" (with The Chainsmokers and Izzy Bizu)	2025	Levi Did It	Arista	
"Schlaf" (with Bausa)	2025	Non-album single	Arista	
"What If You Fly (Sweet Disposition)" (with The Temper Trap)	2026	Levi Did It	Arista	
"I Need U" (with Malou)	2026	Non-album single	Arista	
"Trippin (Opera Edit)" (with Mapei & Dan Whitlam)	2026	Levi Did It	Arista	
"One Two Police" (with Mo-Do)	2026	Levi Did It	Arista	
"Love Tonight"	2026	Non-album single	Arista	
"Nie Allein" (with JBS)	2026	Non-album single	Arista	
"Comes Back Around" (with Kaskade)	2026	Origin //	ARKADE/TH3RD BIRD	
"Liebe" (with JBS)	2026	Levi Did It	Arista	
"World Away" (with Gryffin and Inez)	2026	Non-album single	Gryffin LLC	
"Stay" (with Lauren Spencer Smith)	2026	Levi Did It	Arista	
"Nothing Lasts Forever" (with RØAM)	2026	Levi Did It	Arista	
"I Will Found You"	2026	Levi Did It	Arista	

=== Remixes ===
List of remixes, year released, showing original artist and references
Title	Year	Original artist	Ref.
"Save Tonight" (BUNT. Remix with ortoPilot)	2016	Eagle-Eye Cherry	
"Desire" (BUNT. Edit)	2016	Years & Years	
"Let's Hurt Tonight" (BUNT. Remix)	2017	OneRepublic	
"Riptide" (BUNT. Remix)	2017	Vance Joy (featuring MisterWives)	
"Back To You" (BUNT. Remix)	2017	WILD	
"Sweater Weather" (BUNT. Remix)	2017	The Neighbourhood	
"Statue (The Pill Song)" (BUNT. Remix)	2017	Smith & Thell	
"Without You" (BUNT. Remix)	2017	Avicii (featuring Sandro Cavazza)	
"You" (BUNT. Remix)	2019	Steerner	
"Wolf" (BUNT. Remix)	2019	First Aid Kit	
"Power Over Me" (BUNT. Remix)	2019	Dermot Kennedy	
"Little Lion Man" (BUNT. Remix)	2020	Mumford & Sons	
"I'll Wait" (BUNT. Remix)	2020	Kygo (featuring Sasha Sloan)	
"Brother" (BUNT. Remix)	2020	Mighty Oaks	
Renegades" (BUNT. Remix)	2020	X Ambassadors	
"Stubborn Love" (BUNT. Remix)	2020	The Lumineers	
"Oceans Away" (BUNT. Remix)	2020	ARIZONA	
"What Would I Change It To" (BUNT. Edit)	2020	Avicii (featuring AlunaGeorge)	
"All You Need Is Love" (BUNT. Remix)	2020	Avicii	
"Going Going Gone" (BUNT. Remix)	2020	Maddie Poppe	
"I Will Remain" (BUNT. Remix)	2020	Matthew and the Atlas	
"Cold Little Heart" (BUNT. Remix)	2020	Michael Kiwanuka	
"King and Lionheart" (BUNT. Remix)	2020	Of Monsters and Men	
"Electric Love" (BUNT. Remix)	2020	Børns	
"Here We Go" (BUNT. Remix)	2020	WILD	
"Safe and Sound" (BUNT. Remix)	2020	Capital Cities	
"Home/Dirty Paws" (BUNT. Edit)	2021	Gardiner Sisters	
"Lay Your Head on Me" (BUNT. Remix)	2021	Major Lazer	
"Little Talks" (BUNT. Edit)	2021	Of Monsters and Men	
"Kocaine Karolina" (BUNT. Edit)	2021	Elle King	
"Cleopatra" (BUNT. Remix)	2021	The Lumineers	
"Part Of Me" (BUNT. Remix)	2021	Noah Kahan	
"You" (BUNT. Remix)	2021	Benny Blanco (featuring Vance Joy and Marshmello)	
"Light Year" (BUNT. Remix)	2021	Adam Melchor (featuring Lennon Stella)	
"Welcome Home Son" (BUNT. Edit)	2021	Radical Face	
"You Be Love" (BUNT. Remix)	2021	Avicii (featuring (Billy Raffoul)	
"Keep It Simple" (BUNT. Remix)	2021	Matoma (featuring Petey Martin and Wilder Woods)	
"On My Way" (BUNT. Remix)	2021	Sons Of The East	
"What A Time" (BUNT. Remix)	2021	Julia Michaels (featuring Niall Horan)	
"IDK You Yet" (BUNT. Remix)	2021	Alexander 23	
"Nothing Breaks Like A Heart" (BUNT. Remix)	2021	Miley Cyrus & Mark Ronson	
"I Take Your Hand" (BUNT. Edit)	2021	Mumford And Sons	
"Unbreakable" (Indie Version)	2021	Bunt (duo)	
"Use Me" (BUNT. Remix)	2021	Alec Benjamin	
"Can't Say No" (BUNT. Remix)	2021	Carol Ades	
"Hurricane" (Folk Version)	2021	Bunt (duo)	
"Take Yours, I'll Take Mine" (BUNT. Remix)	2021	Matthew Mole	
"Lie With Me" (BUNT. Remix)	2021	Josiah And The Bonnevilles	
"Afterlove" (BUNT. Remix)	2022	Mason Watts	
"The Days" (BUNT. Remix)	2022	Sandro Cavazza	
"The Days" (2013 Time Machine Remix)	2022	Sandro Cavazza	
"Forgive Me Friend" (BUNT. Remix)	2022	Smith & Thell	
"Follow Me" (BUNT. Remix)	2022	Sam Feldt & Rita Ora	
"Opalite" (BUNT. Remix)	2026	Taylor Swift	
"Clarity" (BUNT. Remix)	2026	Zedd, Foxes, Valorant	
