= Oh My My (album) =

Studio album by OneRepublic
- Released: October 7, 2016
- Recorded: 2014–2016
- Genres: Pop rock; electropop
- Length: 60:26
- Labels: Mosley; Interscope
- Producers: Benny Blanco; Cassius; Brandon Collins; Katalyst; Brent Kutzle; Steve Wilmot; MojaveGhst; Zach Skelton; Ryan Tedder; Noel Zancanella

OneRepublic chronology
Native (2013)	Oh My My (2016)	Human (2021)

Singles from Oh My My
- 1. "Wherever I Go" Released: May 13, 2016; 2. "Kids" Released: August 12, 2016; 3. "Let's Hurt Tonight" Released: December 6, 2016

Alternative cover
- US re-release cover

Oh My My is the fourth studio album by American pop rock band OneRepublic. It was released on October 7, 2016, through Mosley Music Group and Interscope Records, three years after the release of the band's third studio album, Native (2013). Due to Native's success with the tracks "Counting Stars" and "Love Runs Out", Oh My My incorporates some elements of their electronic production. Ryan Tedder, the band's lead singer, songwriter and producer, focused on lyrics about optimism, love, and overcoming past traumas.

Seeking to escape the purely electronic sound that was high on the radio at the time, the band used instruments that left the album's sound organic, while not sounding outdated. Along with band members Tedder, Brent Kutzle and Skelton, the album was produced by Benny Blanco and Noel Zancanella, who had previously worked on their previous albums. Marking a radical departure from pop rock from its predecessor works, Oh My My is built around electropop, arena rock and groovy, inspired by genres such as country, funk and gospel, resulting in an electronic production consisting of new-age music and rhythmic beats. Oh My My was the band's album with the most tracks on its standard version, and featured guest appearances by French band Cassius on the title track "Oh My My", as well as former Genesis rock band lead singer Peter Gabriel on the track "A.I." and singer-songwriter Santigold on the track "NbHD".

Three international singles—"Wherever I Go", "Kids" and "Let's Hurt Tonight"—supported the album; they peaked at number fifty-five and ninety-six on the Billboard Hot 100, with the latter being included as a track in the film Collateral Beauty and peaking number twenty-one on Billboard Adult Top 40. "Future Looks Good" and "A.I." preceded the album as promotional tracks. Critical response to Oh My My was generally positive. Reviewers were divided on the album's exaggerated size and overproduction, making Tedder's voice a background to focus on instrumental sounds and electropop beats, but praised Tedder's songwriting and the band's impetus to step out of their comfort zone and explore a different loudness than the conventional.

The album was OneRepublic's second consecutive album to debut in the top five on the Billboard 200, reaching No. 3 in its first week and surpassing the debut of their previous album, Native, by one position and reaching the top five in several countries, including Canada, Ireland, New Zealand, Scotland, and Switzerland. Unlike the band's previous albums, Oh My My had lower sales than expected, a factor influenced by the low promotion carried out and the lack of a hit single. A concert tour promoting the album was planned for early 2017, but canceled after the physical, emotional and psychological health issues involving Tedder. Despite this, the band promoted the album singles with a smaller-scale tour, 16th Annual Honda Civic Tour (2017), sponsored by Honda. A re-release of the album with only eleven tracks was made on December 2, 2016, exclusively for retail and digital in the United States.

== Background and composition ==
Talking to Wonderland Magazine about Oh My My, OneRepublic frontman Ryan Tedder spoke about what fans could expect from the album: "Everything – you could do an entire album on a laptop these days, and some of the biggest records are all electronic laptop driven, and there's a lot of humanity, I think, missing in radio. And so we wanted to make sure that you could actually hear the human beings and the actual instruments that are in the actual songs, so that's the last thing I'll say. It's new and very modern but there's still a big dose of humanity in it because you can actually hear the players." In a later interview with Billboard, Tedder revealed that the album took eighteen months to record, which was "the longest amount of time [the band had] ever spent on one project[...]We did a lot of living in the last four years -- there was a lot to write about."

On August 25, the band tweeted that the new album was called Oh My My and would come out on October 7, 2016. The artwork for the album was revealed six days later.

== Promotion ==
OneRepublic has promoted the album at the 2016-2017 NFL Kickoff Concert: in Denver, Colorado, and shows such as The Tonight Show Starring Jimmy Fallon, Today, and The Ellen DeGeneres Show

=== Tour ===
The band promoted the album on the Honda Civic Tour.

== Singles ==
The album's official first single, "Wherever I Go", was released on May 13, 2016. The song has peaked at number 55 on the Billboard Hot 100 as of July 2016.

The second single, "Kids", was released on August 12, 2016.

In November 2016, the band announced that "Let's Hurt Tonight" would be featured on the official soundtrack of the film Collateral Beauty. They later performed the song at the MTV Europe Music Awards. On December 6, 2016, after performing at The Voice, an official video for the song was released on their VEVO channel, featuring some scenes from Collateral Beauty. The song was sent to US Hot AC radio on January 9, 2017.

=== Promotional singles ===
"Future Looks Good" was released as the first promotional single along with the pre-order on September 8, 2016; it was used in the video of Canada/Mexico/United States' bid for 2026 FIFA World Cup. The second promotional single was "A.I.", which featured Peter Gabriel, the former frontman of Genesis, and was released on September 30. "Lift Me Up" was released at the third and final promotional single as Michaël Brun's remix on June 9, 2017.

== Reception ==
=== Critical reception ===
Professional ratings
Aggregate scores
Source	Rating
Metacritic	66/100
Review scores
Source	Rating
AllMusic	3.5/5 stars
The Badger Herald	3/5 stars
Entertainment Weekly	B
Evening Standard	2/5 stars
Exeposé	3/5 stars
The Guardian	3/5 stars
Idolator	3/5 stars
Knoxville News Sentinel	3.5/5 stars
Sputnikmusic	1.5/5 stars
Renowned for Sound	2.5/5 stars

Oh My My received generally positive reviews from music critics. At Metacritic, which assigns a normalized rating out of 100 to reviews from mainstream critics, the album received an average score of 66, based on 4 reviews, which indicates "generally favorable reviews". Most reviewers praised OneRepublic for its acumen in escaping the comfort zone and seeking organic sounds, but criticized the overproduction on some tracks and the loss of cohesion due to its large number of songs.

Exeposé writer Georgia Seldis opined Oh My My, "Overall, I do love this album and I highly recommend a listen so you can choose your favourites from the bunch. I’ll of course keep looking forward to new, hopefully less dance-y music for probably another four long years", noting the songs see "showcasing Tedder’s amazing voice and an actual melody". Entertainment Weekly's Madison Vain writes Oh My My, "their most diverse-sounding album yet. Electro club bangers like "Kids" and "Human" crash into stadium-sized rock anthems before giving way to gospel-tinged sing-alongs. There are also R&B-ish moments, electro-funk adventures in the title track "Oh My My", and pure pop delights in 'Lift Me Up'". Caroline Sullivan of The Guardian says "Tedder has used his golden ear for hooks lavishly here: if OneRepublic’s 2014 hit Counting Stars was ear-wormy, these tracks are certified ear-centipedes", but criticizes the lack of cohesion in closing by saying: "problematically, though, he has produced the album to replicate a playlist, yielding a plethora of styles upon which OneRepublic don’t quite stamp their own identity". Camille Espiritu of The Young Folks appreciated Tedder's maturity, particularly his ability to pull together different narratives and sounds based on the cultures the band experienced during their previous tour trips.

Jon Reyes from Idolator said the album served as a reminder of Tedder's songwriting talent, labeling "Lift Me Up", "Heaven", "Born" and "Fingertips" as standouts of the album, writing that "in these lies the heart of OneRepublic, a distillation of Tedder’s influence and his influences. It's a potpourri formula that, with Oh My My, hasn’t lost its fragrance". At the Knoxville News Sentinel, Chuck Campbell praises Tedder's lyricism and the album's overall production, writing that makes them "a aural grandiosity". Katrina Rees of CelebMix praised the band's eclecticism in breaking out of their comfort zone and exploring different melodies and rhythms, particularly Tedder's vocal ability to transition from pop rock to country, writing that "On paper, Oh My My might sound like a mismatched combination of tracks, however, in its entirety it actually works very well. OneRepublic have successfully proven their musical diversity and have delivered an eclectic album which is definitely worth listening to". Writing for Cross Rhythms, Tony Cummings gave the album nine stars of ten and said it is "the band's most diverse project so far". Gracelyn Trast of The Badger Herald praises the tracks with guest appearances, praising the way the band knew how to unite their passionate melodies with the characteristic style of the guest artists.

In a less favorable review, Daniel Patrin from Renowned for Sound wrote the album "displays an attempt at sounding different" but "just feed the appetite of supersaturated pop hunger". Writing for Evening Standard, Andre Paine summarized the album as a "hard bloated record loaded with feelings of self-indulgence", but praised the tracks "A.I." and "NbHD", saying that both "underlines Tedder’s technical ability in the studio".

=== Year-end lists ===
Select year-end rankings of Oh My My
Critic/Publication	List	Rank	Ref.
PopSugar	The Best Albums of 2016	14	

== Commercial performance ==
Oh My My debuted at number three on the US Billboard 200 with 46,000 units, of which 35,000 were traditional album sales. Unlike their two previous albums Waking Up and Native, Oh My My proved not to be a slowburner and left most of the major music markets' charts notably fast, most likely due to the lack of a hit single. Ryan Tedder later addressed the band's absence from promoting the album, citing anxiety and mental fatigue as the key reason.

== Track listing ==
Standard edition
No.	Title	Writer(s)	Producer(s)	Length
1.	"Let's Hurt Tonight"	Ryan Tedder; Noel Zancanella	Tedder; Zancanella	3:14
2.	"Future Looks Good"	Tedder; Brent Kutzle	Kutzle; Tedder	3:30
3.	"Oh My My" (featuring Cassius)	Tedder; Kutzle; Zancanella	Tedder; Kutzle; Zancanella; Cassius (add.)	3:38
4.	"Kids"	Tedder; Kutzle; Brandon Michael Collins; Steve Wilmot	Kutzle; Tedder; Wilmot (add.)	3:58
5.	"Dream"	Tedder; Kutzle; Zancanella	Tedder; Kutzle; Zancanella	3:31
6.	"Choke"	Tedder; Zancanella	Tedder; Zancanella	3:46
7.	"A.I." (featuring Peter Gabriel)	Tedder; Kutzle; Peter Gabriel; Wilmot	Tedder; Kutzle; Wilmot	5:09
8.	"Better"	Tedder; Kutzle; Wilmot; James Dzuris; Joseph Dzuris	Tedder; Kutzle; Wilmot; MojaveGhst	3:24
9.	"Born"	Tedder; Zancanella; Kutzle; Benjamin Levin; Ammar Malik	Tedder; Benny Blanco; Kutzle; Zancanella	4:25
10.	"Fingertips"	Tedder; Zancanella; Levin; Romy Madley Croft	Blanco; Tedder	4:15
11.	"Human"	Tedder; Zancanella; Drew Brown	Tedder; Zancanella; Zach Skelton (add.)	3:40
12.	"Lift Me Up"	Tedder; Kutzle	Kutzle; Tedder; MojaveGhst (add.)	3:46
13.	"NbHD" (featuring Santigold)	Tedder; Kutzle; James Dzuris; Brown; Santi White	Kutzle; MojaveGhst	3:44
14.	"Wherever I Go"	Tedder; Kutzle; Zancanella	Tedder; Kutzle; Zancanella	2:49
15.	"All These Things"	Tedder; Zancanella	Tedder; Zancanella; Katalyst (add.)	3:19
16.	"Heaven"	Tedder; Kutzle	Tedder; Kutzle; Wilmot (add.)	4:18
Total length:				60:26

Target exclusive and international deluxe edition
No.	Title	Writer(s)	Producer(s)	Length
17.	"Colors"	Tedder; Kutzle; Eddie Fisher; Zancanella	Tedder; Zancanella; Kutzle	3:51
18.	"The Less I Know"	Tedder; Zach Filkins	Tedder	3:44
19.	"Heaven" (acoustic version)	Tedder; Kutzle	Kutzle; Wilmot	3:53
20.	"Better" (string version)	Tedder; Kutzle; Wilmot; James Dzuris; Joseph Dzuris	Brandon Collins; Kutzle; Wilmot	3:23
Total length:				75:17

10th Anniversary Deluxe Edition
No.	Title	Writer(s)	Producer(s)	Length
17.	"Colors (Deluxe Version)"	Tedder; Kutzle; Eddie Fisher; Zancanella	Tedder; Zancanella; Kutzle	3:36
18.	"Let's Hurt Tonight" (stripped version)	Tedder; Zancanella	Tedder; Zancanella	3:16
19.	"The Less I Know"	Tedder; Zach Filkins	Tedder	3:45
20.	"Better" (string version)	Tedder; Kutzle; Wilmot; James Dzuris; Joseph Dzuris	Brandon Collins; Kutzle; Wilmot	3:24
21.	"Kids" (SeeB remix)	Tedder; Kutzle; Collins; Wilmot	SeeB (remix); Kutzle; Tedder; Wilmot (add.)	3:16
22.	"Let's Hurt Tonight" (BUNT. remix)	Tedder; Zancanella	BUNT. (remix); Tedder; Zancanella	3:51
Total length:				81:55

United States re-release
No.	Title	Writer(s)	Producer(s)	Length
1.	"Let's Hurt Tonight"	Ryan Tedder; Noel Zancanella	Tedder; Zancanella	3:14
2.	"Future Looks Good"	Tedder; Brent Kutzle	Kutzle; Tedder	3:30
3.	"Wherever I Go"	Tedder; Kutzle; Zancanella	Tedder; Kutzle; Zancanella	2:49
4.	"Kids"	Tedder; Kutzle; Brandon Michael Collins; Steve Wilmot	Kutzle; Tedder; Wilmot (add.)	3:58
5.	"Choke"	Tedder; Zancanella	Tedder; Zancanella	3:46
6.	"Oh My My" (featuring Cassius)	Tedder; Kutzle; Zancanella	Tedder; Kutzle; Zancanella; Cassius (add.)	3:38
7.	"Born"	Tedder; Zancanella; Kutzle; Benjamin Levin; Ammar Malik	Tedder; Benny Blanco; Kutzle; Zancanella	4:25
8.	"A.I." (featuring Peter Gabriel)	Tedder; Kutzle; Peter Gabriel; Wilmot	Tedder; Kutzle; Wilmot	5:09
9.	"Better"	Tedder; Kutzle; Wilmot; James Dzuris; Joseph Dzuris	Tedder; Kutzle; Wilmot; MojaveGhst	3:24
10.	"Fingertips"	Tedder; Zancanella; Benjamin Levin; Romy Madley Croft	Benny Blanco; Tedder	4:15
11.	"Heaven"	Tedder; Kutzle	Tedder; Kutzle; Wilmot (add.)	4:18
Total length:				42:26

== Personnel ==
Adapted from the album's liner notes and the official mini documentary, except where noted.

=== OneRepublic ===
- Ryan Tedder – vocals, lyrics & composition, instrumentation (all); acoustic guitar (1); piano (2, 14); percussion (2); production (except 13, "Heaven (acoustic version)", & "Better (string version)")
- Brent Kutzle – bass, keyboards, instrumentation (all); guitar (except 14); acoustic guitar (1, 2); piano (2); EBow (5); Nord Lead 2X (8); organ, programming, backing vocals (14); production (2–5, 7–9, 12–14, 16, "Colors", "Heaven (acoustic version)", "Better (string version)", "Colors (Deluxe Version)", & "Kids (SeeB remix)")
- Zach Filkins – guitar (except 14); acoustic guitar (1, 14); backing vocals (14)
- Drew Brown – guitar (all); backing vocals (14)
- Eddie Fisher – drums (except 14); backing vocals (14)

=== Additional musicians ===
- Noel Zancanella – production (1, 3, 5, 6, 9, 11, 17); programming (1, 5, 6, 9, 11, 14, "Colors", "Colors (Deluxe Version)"); keys (1, 5, 6, 11); drums (1, 5, 6); percussion (11, 17); bass (11)
- Steve Wilmot – production (7, 8, 19, 20); co-production (4, "Kids (SeeB remix)"); additional production (16); tubular bells, timpani (1); additional percussion (2, 14); percussion (3, 9, ); vocoder (3, 10); engineering (2, 5, 7, 9, 11–14, 19, 20); additional engineering (3)
- Tyler Spry – pedal steel (2); additional sounds (4, 12, 16); additional instrumentation (4); engineering (2, 7, 8, 12, 13, 16, 19, 20); assistant engineer (4)
- Laércio da Costa Henrique – percussion (2)
- Brian Willet – additional instrumentation (4); additional sounds (7, 12); additional keys (8, 16–18, 20)
- Cassius (Zdar & Boombass) – additional production (3)
- Robert Stevenson – vocal production & choir arrangement (6)
- Jaymee Rodriguez – choir (6)
- Joellee Wilson – choir (6)
- Justin Levy – choir (6)
- Maurice Greene – choir (6)
- Shannon Lemon – choir (6)
- Shaunise Brown – choir (6)
- Tanjala Wright – choir (6)
- Trevon Travis – choir (6)
- Tolanda Simpson – choir (6)
- Peter Gabriel – featured vocals (7)
- Avery Bright – violin, viola (7, 8)
- Craig Nelson – bass (8)
- Paul Nelson – cello (8)
- Dana Anderson – choir (8)
- Dakota Anderson – choir (8)
- Karis Anderson – choir (8)
- Duson Dismuke – choir (8)
- Mac Duran – choir (8)
- Sydney Duran – choir (8)
- Trey Justice – choir (8)
- Emma Rose Williamson – choir (8)
- Hannah Wise – choir (8)
- Taylor Wise – choir (8)
- Shelly Justice – choir (8, 16, 19)
- Shelley Jennings – choir (8)
- Benny Blanco – production, keys (9, 10)
- Romy – guitar (10)
- Santigold – featured vocals (13)
- Darrell Leonard – horn, trumpet, trombone, tuba, saxophone (13)
- Andrew Foster – additional background gang vocals (14); background vocals (16)
- Katalyst (Ken Lewis & Brent Kolatalo) – additional production, guitars, keys, drum programming (15)
- Brandon Collins – choir arrangement (16)
- David Wise – choir session leader (16); assistant engineer (8)
- Emoni Wilkins – choir (16, 19)
- Raquel Payne – choir (16, 19)
- Kim Flemming – choir (16, 19)
- Debi Selby – choir (16, 19)
- Melinda Doolittle – choir (16, 19)
- Gale Mayes – choir (16, 19)
- Nickie Conley – choir (16, 19)
- Terry White – choir (16, 19)
- Royce Mosley – choir (16, 19)
- Calvin Nowell – choir (16, 19)
- Ilya Toshinskiy – electric guitar, acoustic guitar, tenor 12 string guitar, celeste, solo bass guitar
- Ian Fitchuk – drums, percussion, B3 piano
- Lex Price – upright bass

=== Technical personnel ===
- MojaveGhst – production (8, 13); additional production (12)
- Zach Skeleton – additional production (11)
- SeeB – production, remixing ("Kids" (SeeB remix)")
- BUNT. – production, remixing ("Let's Hurt Tonight" (BUNT. remix)")
- Șerban Ghenea – mixing (1, 4, 5, 7, 8, 12)
- Joe Zook – mixing (2, 11, 17, 18)
- Mark "Spike" Stent – mixing (3, 6, 9, 10, 14)
- Manny Marroquin – mixing (13, 15)
- Bryan Cook – mixing (17, 18)
- John Nathaniel – remixer ("Colors" (Deluxe Version)")
- John Hanes – engineer for mix (1, 4, 5, 7, 8, 12
- Chris Galland – mix engineer (13, 15)
- Matty Green – assistant engineer for mix (3, 6, 9, 10)
- Geoff Swan – assistant engineer for mix (3, 6, 9, 10)
- Jeff Jackson – assistant mix engineer (13, 15)
- Robin Florent – assistant mix engineer (13, 15)
- Rich Rich – engineering (except 19 & 20)
- Mike Piersante – engineering (1, 3, 5, 6, 13, 14, 17, 18,
- Estevam Romera – engineering (2,
- Christopher Henry – engineering (3, 5
- Richard Chappell – engineering (7
- Shane McConnell – engineering (8,
- David Schwerkolt – engineering (9, 10,
- Chris Sclafani – engineering (10)
- Garth Justice – engineering (16)
- Reid Shippen – engineering (18)
- Riley Bell – assistant engineer (1,
- Luke Schidnler – assistant engineer (1,
- Matthew Tryba – assistant engineer (1, 5, 6, 9, 14, 17,
- Mike Stankieqics – assistant engineer (18)
- Will Kennedy – additional engineering (20)
- Brendan Morawski – additional vocal engineering (13)
- Chris Gehringer – mastering
- ASHKAHN – creative direction
- Genevieve Tedder – original photography
- Gretchen Anderson – executive production
- Kam Sangha – executive production

== Charts ==
Chart (2016)	Peak position
Australian Albums (ARIA)	8
Austrian Albums (Ö3 Austria)	8
Belgian Albums (Ultratop Flanders)	25
Belgian Albums (Ultratop Wallonia)	22
Canadian Albums (Billboard)	4
Danish Albums (Hitlisten)	33
Dutch Albums (Album Top 100)	14
Finnish Albums (Suomen virallinen lista)	27
French Albums (SNEP)	37
German Albums (Offizielle Top 100)	6
Greek Albums (IFPI Greece)	26
Hungarian Albums (MAHASZ)	26
Irish Albums (IRMA)	5
Italian Albums (FIMI)	9
New Zealand Albums (RMNZ)	5
Norwegian Albums (VG-lista)	14
Polish Albums (ZPAV)	18
Portuguese Albums (AFP)	36
Scottish Albums (Official Charts)	3
Spanish Albums (Promusicae)	16
Swedish Albums (Sverigetopplistan)	25
Swiss Albums (Schweizer Hitparade)	3
UK Albums (Official Charts)	6
US Billboard 200	3

== Certifications ==
Region	Certification	Certified units/sales
Italy (FIMI)	Gold	25,000^{‡}
New Zealand (RMNZ)	Gold	7,500^{‡}
Poland (ZPAV)	Gold	10,000^{‡}
United Kingdom (BPI)	Silver	60,000^{‡}
United States (RIAA)	Gold	500,000^{‡}
^{‡} Sales+streaming figures based on certification alone.

== Release history ==
List of release dates, showing region, formats, label, editions and reference
Region	Date	Format(s)	Label	Edition(s)
Various	October 7, 2016	CD; digital download	Mosley; Interscope; Polydor; Universal	Standard edition; Deluxe edition
