= Madonna (disambiguation) =

Madonna (born 1958) is an American singer-songwriter and actress.

Madonna may also refer to:

== People ==
- Mary, mother of Jesus
- Madonna (name), a given name or surname originally from Italian
- Madonna (nickname), a moniker of several individuals after the American singer
- Madonna, a nickname of Joan Baez
- Madonna, leader of 1990s gang 5T

== Art ==
- Madonna (art), pictorial or sculptured representations of Mary, mother of Jesus
- Madonna (Munch), an 1895 painting by Edvard Munch
- Anarchist Madonna, a photograph of Ana Garbín

== Film ==
- Madonna (1999 film), a Croatian film
- Madonna (2015 film), a South Korean film

== Music ==
=== Albums ===
- Madonna (self-titled album) (1983)
- Madonna (Alisha Chinai album) (1989)
- Madonna (...And You Will Know Us by the Trail of Dead album) (1999)
- Madonna (EP), a 2010 EP by Secret

=== Songs ===
- "Madonna" (Snail Mail song), 2021
- "Madonna" (Natanael Cano and Óscar Maydon song), 2024
- "Madonna", a 1988 song by Sparks from Interior Design
- "Madonna", a 2004 song by CocoRosie from La maison de mon rêve
- "Madonna", a 2010 song by Secret from Madonna
- "Madonna", a 2015 song by Drake from If You're Reading This It's Too Late
- "Madonna", a 2021 song by Bausa
- "Madonna", a 2021 song by Luna
- "Lady Madonna", a 1968 single by the Beatles

== Places ==
- Madonna di Campiglio, a village and ski resort in Trento, Italy
- Madonna di Campagna, a quarter and subway station in Turin, Italy
- Madonna, Maryland, an unincorporated community in the United States

== Education ==
- Madonna University, Livonia, Michigan, United States
- Madonna University, Nigeria
- Madonna Catholic Secondary School, Toronto, Ontario, Canada
- Weirton Madonna High School, Weirton, West Virginia, United States
- Madonna Academy, predecessor of Chaminade-Madonna College Preparatory School, Hollywood, Florida, United States

== Other uses ==
- Madonna (book), a 2001 biography of the singer by Andrew Morton
- Madonna (studio), a Japanese adult video company

== See also ==
- Madona (disambiguation)
- Madonna and Child (disambiguation)
- Donna (disambiguation)
