= Nangang C3 Field =

Music venue in Taipei, Taiwan

The Nangang C3 Field is a parking lot, located in Taipei, Taiwan. It is used as a parking lot in regular day, but it is also used as a concert ground, several artists like Mayday, David Guetta, OneRepublic had held some concerts in this place. Cirque du Soleil also played several shows here.

== Concerts ==
Date	Performer(s)	Tour/Event	Attendance
December 6, 2014	Various artists: Mayday; Jolin Tsai; Jonathan Lee; Jam Hsiao; David Tao; Jeannie Hsieh; Magic Power; Dream Girls	CTBC Bank "Hope is Here" Live Concert	40,000
July 23, 2016	Mayday	Just Rock It！World Tour	40,000
July 24, 2016	Mayday	Just Rock It！World Tour	40,000
December 7, 2016	Alan Walker	Walker Tour	—N/a
January 6, 2017	David Guetta	2017 Live in Taipei	7,000
September 17, 2017	OneRepublic	2017 Live in Taipei	—N/a
January 15, 2018	Imagine Dragons	Evolve World Tour	—N/a
January 27, 2018	ONE OK ROCK	Ambitions Asia Tour	20,000
March 19, 2018	John Legend	Darkness and Light Tour	—N/a
September 20, 2018	Jessie J	R.O.S.E Tour	—N/a
December 12, 2018	The Weeknd	The Weeknd ASIA Live in Taipei	Cancelled

== Cirque du Soleil ==
Name	Start Date	End Date	No. of Shows
Varekai	January 20, 2011	March 5, 2011	45
OVO	November 19, 2013	January 5, 2014	55
