= Future Looks Good =

2016 promotional single by OneRepublic

Promotional single by OneRepublic

from the album Oh My My
- Released: September 8, 2016
- Length: 3:30
- Label: Mosley; Interscope
- Songwriters: Ryan Tedder; Brent Kutzle
- Producers: Tedder; Kutzle

Performance video
- "Future Looks Good" on YouTube

"Future Looks Good" is a song by American rock band OneRepublic. The song serves as the first promotional single and second track from the band's fourth studio album Oh My My. It was released September 8, 2016, alongside the pre-order for the album. "Future Looks Good" was written and produced by band members Ryan Tedder and Brent Kutzle. The song was used in the successful Canada/Mexico/United States' bid for 2026 FIFA World Cup.

== Music video ==
The performance video of the song was released on October 30, 2016 and features the band members performing the song on a stage of multicolored flashing lights and lighting effects.

== Personnel ==
Musicians

- Ryan Tedder – lead vocals, background vocals
- Zach Filkins – guitar
- Drew Brown – guitar
- Brent Kutzle – bass guitar, guitar
- Eddie Fisher – drums

Additional musicians

- Tyler Spry – pedal steel guitar
- Laércio da Costa Henrique – percussion
- Steve Wilmot – percussion

Production

- Tedder – production
- Kutzle – production
- Rich Rich – engineering
- Estevam Romera – engineering
- Spry – engineering
- Wilmot – engineering
- Joe Zook – mixing
- Chris Gehringer – mastering

== Charts ==
Chart performance for "Future Looks Good"
Chart (2016)	Peak position
Australia (ARIA)	90
France (SNEP)	97
New Zealand Hot Singles (RMNZ)	4
