= Madona (disambiguation) =

Madona is a town in Latvia.

Madona may also refer to:

- Madona district, Former district of Latvia
- Madona Municipality, Municipality of Latvia

== See also ==
- Madonna (disambiguation)
