= Bausa discography =

Discography of German musician Bausa

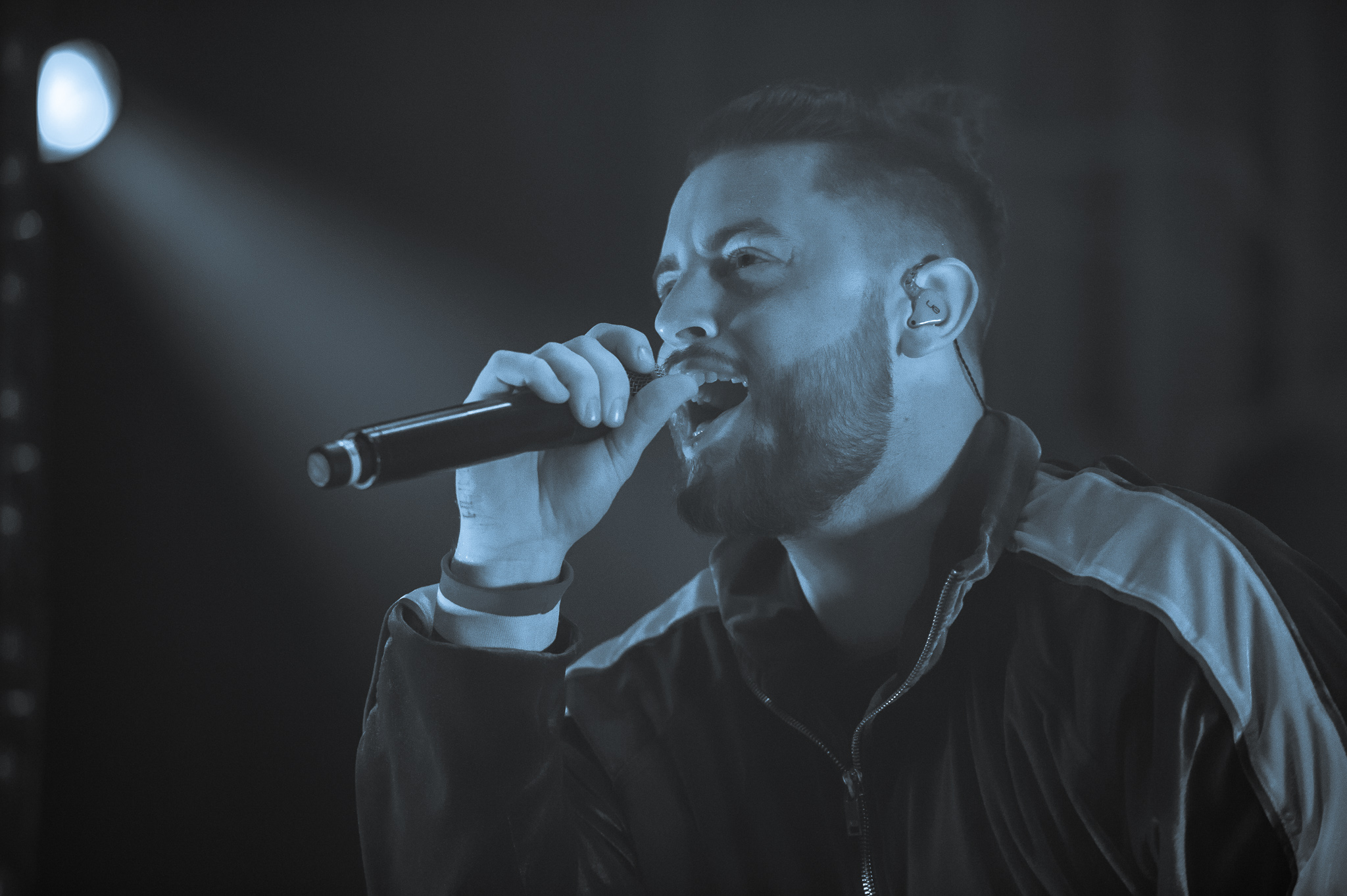
- Bausa performing in February 2018
- Studio albums: 2
- EPs: 1
- Singles: 24
- Music videos: 19
- Mixtapes: 1

German musician Bausa has released two studio albums, one mixtape, one extended play (EP) and twenty-three singles.

== Albums ==
=== Studio albums ===
| Title | Album details | Peak chart positions | | |
| Title | Album details | GER | AUT | SWI |
|---|---|---|---|---|
| Dreifarbenhaus | Released: 21 April 2017; Label: Warner Germany; Formats: CD, download, streaming; Track listing: 1. "Intro"; 2. "Vermisst"; 3. "Wo bist du?"; 4. "Tropfen"; 5. "Baron" (ft. Lativ); 6. "Stripperin"; 7. "Madusa"; 8. "Belle Etage"; 9. "Weit weg"; 10. "Bambi"; 11. "Da wo ich herkomm"; 12. "Pyramiden"; 13. "Danke"; 14." Pyramiden (Akustik)" | 10 | 32 | 70 |
| Fieber | Released: 21 June 2019; Label: Warner Germany; Formats: CD, LP, download, streaming; Track listing: 1. "Intro (Radio)"; 2. "Nacht"; 3. "Guadalajara" (ft. Summer Cem); 4. "Weiß noch nicht wie"; 5. "Mary"; 6. "Licht" (ft. Dardan); 7. "Lang her"; 8. "Fieber"; 9. "Bundesland"; 10. "Regen"; 11. "Liebeslieder"; 12. "So laut" (ft. reezy); 13. "Blauer Himmel"; 14. "Deine Augen" | 9 | 10 | 31 |
| 100 Pro | Released: 26 February 2021; Label: Warner Germany; Formats: CD, LP, download, streaming; Track listing: 1. "Paradox"; 2. "Centre Court" (with RIN and Ufo361); 3. "Madonna" (with Apache 207); 4. "2012" (with Juju); 5. "King Kendrick"; 6. "Selfmade Babylon" (with Bozza); 7. "NY Whisky Sour"; 8. "Silber Blau"; 9. "Weisst wie es ist" (with Sido); 10. "Marlboro Lights" (with Marteria); 11. "I.N.S." (with RIN); 12. "Nutten schlafen nie" (with Bozza) | 6 | 10 | 30 |
| Der Letzte macht das Licht aus | Released: 29 September 2023; Label: Warner Germany; Formats: CD, LP, download, streaming; Track listing: 1. "Tut mir nicht leid" (with Chapo102); 2. "Willkommen im Schnee" (with Jamule); 3. "Ehrenmannn" (with Bozza); 4. "Flashbacks" (with LIZ); 5. "Genauso" (with Dhurata Dora); 6. "Wunschkonzert"; 7. "Haifischbecken" (with MoeWavy); 8. "So wie du"; 9. "100 km/h"; 10. "Bietigheimer Jungs"; 11. "Wo ist mein Geld?"; 12. "Hand aufs Herz" (with Cocon); 13. "Ohne Happy-End"; 14. "Viel passiert"; 15. "OCB"; Deluxe edition: 16. "1000 Mal" (with Lea); 17. "100 km/h (Level Space Edition)"; 18. "Frühling im Viertel (Remix)" | 45 | — | — |

=== Mixtapes ===
| Title | Album details | Peak chart positions | | |
| Title | Album details | GER | AUT | SWI |
|---|---|---|---|---|
| Powerbausa | Released: 9 February 2018; Label: Warner Germany; Formats: CD, download, streaming; Track listing: 1. "Stoff"; 2. "Unterwegs" (ft. Capital Bra); 3. "Szenen im Hotel" (ft. reezy); 4. "Eisblau (Skit)"; 5. "Was du Liebe nennst"; 6. "Belle Etage 2.0" (ft. reezy); 7. "Pillen im Club" (Skit); 8. "In Berlin" (ft. Nura); 9. "Gib mir bös"; 10. "FML"; 11. "Was kostet mich deine Liebe" (ft. Joshi Mizu); 12. "Kleines Rad" | 16 | 26 | 64 |

== Extended plays ==
| Title | EP details |
|---|---|
| Seelenmanöver | Released: 28 February 2014; Label: Hitmonks; Format: download; Track listing: 1. "Intro"; 2. "Sender"; 3. "In dein' Kopf"; 4. "Mond" (ft. Capo); 5. "Land der Mercedese"; 6. "Das Manöver"; 7. "Der nötige Respekt" |
| Sommer 21 | Released: 26 February 2021; Label: Warner Germany; Format: download, streaming; Track listing: 1. "Toca"; 2. "Papi"; 3. "Tanzen" (with Ivana Santacruz); 4. "S-Bahn" |

== Singles ==
=== As lead artist ===
| Title | Year | Peak chart positions | | | Certifications | Album |
| Title | Year | GER | AUT | SWI | Certifications | Album |
|---|---|---|---|---|---|---|
| "Baron" (featuring Lativ) | 2017 | — | — | — | BVMI: Gold | Dreifarbenhaus |
| "Tropfen" | 2017 | — | — | — | | Dreifarbenhaus |
| "Wo bist du?" | 2017 | — | — | — | | Dreifarbenhaus |
| "Stripperin" | 2017 | — | — | — | | Dreifarbenhaus |
| "Was du Liebe nennst" | 2017 | 1 | 1 | 4 | BVMI: 4× Platinum; IFPI AUT: 3× Platinum; IFPI SWI: 2× Platinum | Powerbausa |
| "FML" | 2018 | 33 | — | — | | Powerbausa |
| "Unterwegs" (featuring Capital Bra) | 2018 | 73 | — | — | | Powerbausa |
| "Vagabund" | 2018 | 10 | 25 | — | BVMI: Gold; IFPI AUT: Gold | Non-album single |
| "Licht" (featuring Dardan) | 2019 | 19 | 53 | — | | Fieber |
| "Mary" | 2019 | 8 | 13 | 58 | BVMI: Gold; IFPI AUT: Platinum | Fieber |
| "Guadalajara" (featuring Summer Cem) | 2019 | 40 | 40 | — | | Fieber |
| "Weiß noch nicht wie" | 2019 | 34 | 53 | — | | Fieber |
| "Tempomat" | 2019 | 38 | — | — | | TBA |
| "Skifahren" (with The Cratez and Maxwell featuring Joshi Mizu) | 2019 | 4 | 3 | 28 | BVMI: Platinum | Nonstop |
| "Schlafen" (with Ufo361 and The Cratez) | 2020 | 19 | 27 | 83 | | Nonstop |
| "Sandmann" (with Reezy) | 2020 | 14 | 28 | 51 | IFPI AUT: Gold | Non-album single |
| "Selfmade Babylon" (featuring Bozza) | 2020 | 22 | 45 | 82 | | 100 pro |
| "2012" (with Juju) | 2020 | 2 | 10 | 23 | | 100 pro |
| "Madonna" (with Apache 207) | 2021 | 1 | 1 | 8 | BVMI: 3× Gold | 100 pro |
| "Venus" | 2021 | 19 | 40 | 75 | | Non-album single |
| "Frühling im Viertel" | 2022 | 66 | | | | Non-album singles |
| "Alle warten auf den Drop" | 2022 | | | | | Non-album singles |
| "Der Berg ruft" | 2022 | 50 | 71 | | | Non-album singles |
| "Nachtcafé" (with Berky) | 2023 | | | | | Non-album single |
| "Tut mir nicht leid" (with Chapo102) | 2023 | 50 | | | | Der Letzte macht das Licht aus |
| "Genauso" (with Dhurata Dora) | 2023 | | | | | Der Letzte macht das Licht aus |
| "Hand aufs Herz" (with Cocon) | 2023 | | | | | Der Letzte macht das Licht aus |
| "Flashbacks" (with Liz) | 2023 | | | | | Der Letzte macht das Licht aus |
| "100 km/h (Level Space Edition)" | 2023 | | | | | Der Letzte macht das Licht aus |
| "1000 Mal" (with Lea) | 2023 | 26 | 51 | 57 | | Non-album single |
| "Wegen dir" (with JBS) | 2024 | 84 | | | | Non-album singles |
| "Airforce" (with Fast Boy) | 2024 | | | | | Non-album singles |

=== As featured artist ===
| Title | Year | Peak chart positions | | | Certifications | Album |
| Title | Year | GER | AUT | SWI | Certifications | Album |
|---|---|---|---|---|---|---|
| "Tief in die Nacht" (Capo featuring Bausa) | 2013 | — | — | — | | Hallo Monaco |
| "osaft" (Reezy featuring Bausa) | 2018 | — | — | — | | feueremoji |
| "Junkie" (Rico featuring Yonii and Bausa) | 2018 | 77 | — | — | | Non-album single |
| "Casanova" (Summer Cem featuring Bausa) | 2018 | 4 | 4 | 37 | BVMI: Gold; IFPI AUT: Platinum | Endstufe |
| "Pussy Kush" (Gringo featuring Bausa) | 2018 | 99 | — | — | | Non-album singles |
| "Fokus" (Jugglerz featuring Miami Yacine, Bausa, Nura & Joshi Mizu) | 2018 | 70 | — | — | | Non-album singles |
| "Baui Coupé" (Diplo featuring Bausa) | 2019 | — | — | — | | Europa |
| "Paranoia2" (Reezy featuring Bausa) | 2019 | — | — | — | | Teenager Forever |
| "Facetime (Remix)" (Dardan featuring Reezy & Bausa) | 2019 | — | — | — | | Non-album singles |
| "Vossi Bop Remix" (Stormzy featuring Capo & Bausa) | 2019 | — | — | — | | Non-album singles |
| "Keine Liebe" (Rin featuring Bausa) | 2019 | 5 | 6 | 7 | BVMI: Gold | Nimmerland |
| "9 bis 9" (Sira featuring Bausa and Badchieff) | 2023 | 1 | 2 | 19 | | Non-album single |

=== Soundtrack appearances ===
| Title | Year | Peak chart positions | | | Album |
| Title | Year | GER | AUT | SWI | Album |
|---|---|---|---|---|---|
| "Biturbo" (with Zuna) | 2019 | 26 | 43 | 83 | Need for Speed: Heat Soundtrack |

== Other charted songs ==
List of other charted songs, with chart positions
| Title | Year | Peak | Album |
| Title | Year | GER | Album |
|---|---|---|---|
| "Belle Etage 2.0" (featuring Reezy) | 2018 | 70 | Powerbausa |
| "Nacht" | 2019 | 52 | Fieber |

== Guest appearances ==
List of non-single guest appearances with other performing artists
| Title | Year | Other artist(s) | Album |
|---|---|---|---|
| "Barbiebabyboo" | 2013 | Capo | Hallo Monaco |
| "Bis die Sonne wieder scheint" | 2013 | Caz | Ohne Künstliche Zusätze |
| "K.R.M.O" | 2014 | Caz | Karmasutra |
| "1999 Pt. III (Babos Remix)" | 2014 | Haftbefehl | Russisch Roulette (Deluxe Edition) |
| "Wer Bist Du" | 2015 | Rapsta | Ah! |
| "Odyssee" | 2015 | Haftbefehl, D.O.E. | Unzensiert |
| "Chabos" | 2015 | Haftbefehl, D.O.E., Milonair, Celo, Soufian, Hanybal, Enemy, Abdi, Brate Azzlack, Nimo, Bausa, Diar, Capo | Unzensiert |
| "Mensch sein" | 2016 | Meezy | Meilenstein (Bonus Track Version) |
| "Atramis" | 2016 | Bonez MC, RAF Camora | Tannen aus Plastik |
| "Kreis" | 2017 | Kontra K | Gute Nacht (Deluxe Version) |
| "Komm wir chillen" | 2017 | Capo, Yonii | Alles auf Rot |
| "Heimgehen" | 2017 | Kalim | Thronfolger |
| "Fegefeuer" | 2017 | Miami Yacine | Casia Deluxe |
| "Nordpol" | 2017 | Prinz Pi | Nichts war umsonst |
| "Nordpol" | 2017 | Joshi Mizu | Kaviar & Toast |
| "Verkauft" | 2017 | RAF Camora | Anthrazit RR |
| "paranoia" | 2018 | Reezy, Nihan | feueremoji |
| "Egal wer kommt" | 2018 | Kontra K | Erde & Knochen |
| "Anders als die" | 2018 | Capital Bra | 5 Songs in einer Nacht EP |
| "Ja, nein, vielleicht" | 2018 | Kontra K | Erde & Knochen |
| "Ohne Sinn" | 2019 | Nura | habibi |
| "Hawaii" | 2019 | Adel Tawil | Alles lebt |
| "rOlliN [A Cappella]" | 2019 | Dardan, Reezy | Sorry... (A Cappella) |

== Music videos ==
List of music videos, showing year released and directors
| Title | Year | Other artist(s) | Director(s) | Ref. |
|---|---|---|---|---|
| "Tief in die Nacht" | 2013 | Capo | Adal Giorgis | |
| "Mond" | 2014 | Capo | Erhan Dogan | |
| "Barbiebabyboo" | 2014 | Capo | Unknown | |
| "Baron" | 2017 | Lativ | Idéal Films | |
| "Kleine" | 2017 | Marvin Game | Idéal Films | |
| "Tropfen" | 2017 | None | Adal Giorgis | |
| "Stripperin" | 2017 | None | Yoshnegroni | |
| "Danke" | 2017 | None | Ben G | |
| "Was du Liebe nennst" | 2017 | None | Adal Giorgis | |
| "Fress mich Satt" | 2017 | Joshi Mizu | Farido Davis | |
