= Wherever I Go (OneRepublic song) =

2016 single by OneRepublic

Single by OneRepublic

from the album Oh My My
- Released: May 13, 2016
- Recorded: 2015
- Studio: Revolution Studio (Toronto, Ontario); Ritz-Carlton Moscow (Russia)
- Genre: Funk rock; new wave; synth-pop; electropop
- Length: 2:49
- Label: Mosley; Interscope
- Songwriters: Ryan Tedder; Brent Kutzle; Noel Zancanella
- Producers: Tedder; Kutzle; Zancanella

OneRepublic singles chronology
"I Lived" (2014)	"Wherever I Go" (2016)	"Kids" (2016)

Music video
- "Wherever I Go" on YouTube

"Wherever I Go" is a song recorded by American pop rock band OneRepublic. It was released on May 13, 2016 through Mosley Music Group and Interscope Records as OneRepublic's first single after a long period of focus on the band's Native Tour, which had been extended in May 2014, resulting in the band's longest period between new releases. The song was revealed and released at the end of a week of teasers, as the lead single from the band's fourth studio album Oh My My (2016). It was written and produced by lead singer Ryan Tedder, bassist/cellist Brent Kutzle and producer Noel Zancanella. The song was recorded at Revolution Studio, Toronto, Ontario, and Ritz-Carlton, Moscow, Russia, with additional recording at Neptune Valley and Waterloo Studios, Los Angeles in 2015. "Wherever I Go" is a funk rock, synth-pop, electropop and new wave song, featuring piano lines and a funk-driven rhythm, with lyrics on obsessive love.

The single debuted at number 67 on the US Billboard Hot 100, before climbing several positions to its peak at number 55, marking the second time that a lead single from the band has not reached the top twenty on the Billboard charts. The song reached the top twenty in several other countries. Upon release, the song received acclaim from music critics, being praised for its bold production, danceable beats, unconventional instrumentation and Tedder's vocals. "Wherever I Go" has sold 3 million downloads and was certified double-platinum by the Federazione Industria Musicale Italiana for selling over 100,000 copies in Italy and certified gold by the British Phonographic Industry for selling over 400,000 copies in the UK. At the 2016 Teen Choice Awards, the song was nominated in the Choice Rock Song category.

The "Wherever I Go" music video, directed by Joseph Kahn accompanied the song's release. Following the aesthetic presented on the cover of the single, created by Brazilian street artist Speto, the video's theme is based on a quote from Henry David Thoreau's 1854 book Walden: "The mass of mankind lead lives of quiet desperation", and focuses on a day in the life of a Korean businessman (Kenneth Choi), stuck in his daily routine. The video scored several accolades; was nominated in the EMA's Best World Stage Performance category at the 2016 MTV Europe Music Awards and the Los 40 International Video of the Year category at the LOS40 Music Awards 2016.

== Background and release ==
The single's promotional campaign began in April 2016, when OneRepublic published several easter egg postcards involving the first single from their upcoming fourth album, Oh My My. On May 2, 2016, all the teasers were completed, and with that fans discovered the name of the song that would serve as the first single from OneRepublic's new album. Two days later, on Instagram, the band posted the single's working artwork, confirming "Wherever I Go" as the band's entry into their new era. The song was released to streaming services on May 13, with a premiere via iHeartRadio on May 12.

== Composition and lyrics ==
"Wherever I Go" was written and produced by Tedder, Kutzle and Zancanell, and runs for 2 minutes and 49 seconds, the shortest single OneRepublic had released at that point. The song features piano lines and a funk-driven rhythm, marking a new style for the band. Explaining why it was important the lead single be different from the rest of the new album, Ryan Tedder said to Wonderland, "I think it’s gonna be shocking, kind of the first response anyone has is their eyes are kind of spread open like ‘Oh my god’. It's not indicative of the entire album but it's kind of like if you go have dinner, you don't order steak for an appetizer and steak for dinner. You split it up, and you have different things. So the first single... it's definitely an appetizer, I think it's the best appetizer we could come up with."

Tedder sings here of not being able to find a love to match one that he once had. This previous relationship will always remain a "ghost in the room," whenever he gets together with a new girl. Tedder explained the song is about "obsession, and almost an unnatural, unhealthy level of obsession."

Speaking on BBC Radio 1, Tedder discussed how hard OneRepublic worked to make the song sound fresh and current, but still organic. "It's hard as an actual band to evolve and still keep the humanity in the instruments," he said. "So it's tricky. You wanna hear the bass player, you wanna hear the drummer, but you want it to sound modern at the same time. So it took...ages to crack that code." Speaking to NME, Ryan Tedder explained the background to the song's different sound: "We were listening to a lot of late '90s French and Italian disco records - stuff like Daft Punk, Cassius, Justice," he said. "We were also listening to a lot of Miike Snow and Mew and I became obsessed with the shape of those Scandinavian melodies, because they're so different to American gospel and other things that we've done. And so it was a combination of chasing those records with songs that are very bass and riff-driven that led us to 'Wherever I Go.'"

It felt like the first single because it's a more digestible version of some of the other stuff we've done for the album," Tedder added. "We could have put out other songs first that would have scared off a lot of our fans.

— Tedder talking about "Wherever I Go"

In a Twitter Q&A with fans about the band's new album, Tedder said that "Wherever I Go" was the hardest song to write and took the longest to finish for Oh My My.

== Critical reception ==
Upon release, "Wherever I Go" received universal acclaim from music critics. NME's Nick Levine called it "their slinkiest, funkiest single ever. With this song, Tedder sits like a genuine contender for the title of 'Most In Demand Man In Music'". Dana Getz of Entertainment Weekly wrote that "Wherever I Go" is "a powerful funk-punctuated blast of a track with steam kettle squeals and a come-to-Jesus hook". Idolator writer Robbie Daw's first impressions were "The first word that comes into mind while listening is “dramatic.” And then, right when the song builds up to its booming climax, it ends". David Watt of All-Noise praised the band's eclecticness in totally changing its characteristic sound and bringing something unique to the song, saying "although OneRepublic has recorded a lot of music, they have never recorded anything like this before. Ryan has also done a great job with vocals, making “Wherever I Go” nearly perfect", also highlighting the different vocals and production than usual, "the production is EVERYTHING – it’s fresh, and it’s exciting. And THAT combined with Ryan’s perfect, on-the-money vocals offers a killer equation".

Lewis Corner from Digital Spy called the song "an anthem", and saying "everything just seems, well, bigger. The taut guitar lines are aching for a stadium outing, the thudding kick beat will make your feet twitch, and the pounding piano line is Ryan Tedder on fine form. While past OneRepublic songs have been polished up to a gleam, here the separate strands feel a little unruly. The band's aim to sound more live is effective, and the build up almost mirrors the energy of an EDM banger, but without coming across as synthetic". Rob Copsey from Official Charts said the song is a "stadium pop-rock stomper", writing "the track has many of the hallmarks of a OneRepublic hit".

== Commercial performance ==
On the chart dating June 4, 2016, “Wherever I Go” debuted at number 67 on the Billboard Hot 100. The next week, the song dropped down to number 81 before gaining on the charts, before reaching its peak of number 55 in its ninth week on the chart (July 30, 2016). The song would eventually spend a total of 12 weeks on the charts throughout the summer of 2016.

== Music video ==
The music video premiered on May 17, 2016, directed by Joseph Kahn and produced by Jil Hardin. Within the video, actor Kenneth Choi plays a businessman who faces an uneventful, colorless world of black, white and gray on a daily basis. However, upon meeting a woman, played by actress Yvonne Lu, whom he presumably falls in love with, he subsequently puts down his briefcase, symbolising the idea of him leaving his regular, insipid characteristics behind him. He begins to elaborately dance, an action usually not associated with business. His coworkers look at him aghast before also joining in. Still, he cannot woo over the woman he is interested in. It takes discovering a secret passageway containing the band performing to transform his life into color. When he steps back into the office after watching the band sing, everything becomes vivid and colorful, with the office transformed to a 1970s motif. In the end, it is shown that it was all just a daydream, with him still in the lift, staring at the woman he wants. The music video currently has 111 million views.

Incidentally, the video features Three-time National YoYo Champion Alex Hattori.

== Live performances ==
The day before the premiere of "Wherever I Go", OneRepublic performed the song on the tenth season of The Voice. The band performed the song live for the first time after its release on The Tonight Show Starring Jimmy Fallon on May 19, 2016, in Rockefeller Center, New York City. Five days later, the band returned to the stage to perform the song on season 10 of Britain's Got Talent. Six days later, the band returned to the stage to perform the song again as part of BBC Radio 1's Big Weekend 2016.

== Track listing ==
- Digital download
1. "Wherever I Go" – 2:49
- Digital download — remix
1. "Wherever I Go" (Danny Dove club edit) – 4:57
- CD single
1. "Wherever I Go" – 2:49
2. "Wherever I Go" (Instrumental) – 2:49

== Credits and personnel ==
Credits adapted from CD single liner notes.

Personnel

- Ryan Tedder – songwriter, producer
- Brent Kutzle – songwriter, producer
- Noel Zancanella – songwriter, producer
- Rich Rich – engineer
- Steve Wilmot – engineer
- Matthew Tryba – assistant engineer
- Mark "Spike" Stent – mixer
- Matty Green – assistant engineer for mix
- Geoff Swan – assistant engineer for mix
- Chris Gehringer – mastering

Recording

- Recorded at Revolution Studio, Toronto, Ontario; and Ritz-Carlton, Moscow, Russia
- Additional recording at Neptune Valley and Waterloo Studios, Los Angeles, California
- Mixed at Mixsuite, United Kingdom
- Mastered at Sterling Sound, New York City

== Charts ==
=== Weekly charts ===
Chart (2016–2017)	Peak position
Australia (ARIA)	32
Austria (Ö3 Austria Top 40)	29
Belgium (Ultratip Bubbling Under Flanders)	16
Belgium (Ultratop 50 Wallonia)	45
Canada AC (Billboard)	5
Canada Hot 100 (Billboard)	38
Canada CHR/Top 40 (Billboard)	38
Canada Hot AC (Billboard)	7
Czech Republic Airplay (ČNS IFPI)	22
Czech Republic Singles Digital (ČNS IFPI)	17
Denmark Airplay (Tracklisten)	3
France (SNEP)	78
Germany (GfK)	33
Hungary (Rádiós Top 40)	23
Hungary (Single Top 40)	29
Ireland (IRMA)	39
Italy (FIMI)	17
Latvia (Latvijas Top 40)	6
Netherlands (Dutch Top 40)	28
Netherlands (Single Top 100)	39
New Zealand (Recorded Music NZ)	34
Poland Airplay (ZPAV)	22
Portugal (AFP)	38
Scotland Singles (OCC)	16
Slovakia Airplay (ČNS IFPI)	28
Slovakia Singles Digital (ČNS IFPI)	21
Slovenia (SloTop50)	28
Spain (PROMUSICAE)	69
Sweden (Sverigetopplistan)	29
Switzerland (Schweizer Hitparade)	29
UK Singles (OCC)	29
US Billboard Hot 100	55
US Adult Contemporary (Billboard)	19
US Adult Pop Airplay (Billboard)	11
US Pop Airplay (Billboard)	25

=== Year-end charts ===
Chart (2016)	Position
Canada (Canadian Hot 100)	98
Germany (Official German Charts)	99
Italy (FIMI)	54
Switzerland (Schweizer Hitparade)	80
US Adult Top 40 (Billboard)	40

== Certifications ==
Region	Certification	Certified units/sales
Australia (ARIA)	Platinum	70,000^{‡}
Austria (IFPI Austria)	Gold	15,000^{‡}
Brazil (Pro-Música Brasil)	Platinum	60,000^{‡}
Canada (Music Canada)	Gold	40,000^{‡}
Denmark (IFPI Danmark)	Platinum	90,000^{‡}
France (SNEP)	Gold	66,666^{‡}
Germany (BVMI)	Gold	200,000^{‡}
Italy (FIMI)	2× Platinum	100,000^{‡}
New Zealand (RMNZ)	Platinum	30,000^{‡}
Poland (ZPAV)	Gold	25,000^{‡}
Portugal (AFP)	Gold	5,000^{‡}
Spain (Promusicae)	Gold	30,000^{‡}
Sweden (GLF)	Platinum	40,000^{‡}
United Kingdom (BPI)	Gold	400,000^{‡}
United States (RIAA)	Platinum	1,000,000^{‡}
Summaries
Worldwide	—	3,000,000
^{‡} Sales+streaming figures based on certification alone.

== Release history ==
Region	Date	Format	Label
Worldwide	13 May 2016	Digital download	Mosley Music Group; Interscope Records
Worldwide	27 May 2016	CD maxi single	Mosley Music Group; Interscope Records
