= A.I. (song) =

2016 promotional single by OneRepublic

Promotional single by OneRepublic featuring Peter Gabriel

from the album Oh My My
- Released: September 30, 2016
- Length: 5:09
- Label: Mosley; Interscope
- Songwriters: Ryan Tedder; Brent Kutzle; Peter Gabriel; Steve Wilmot
- Producers: Tedder; Kutzle; Wilmot

Licensed audio
- "A.I. (Audio)" on YouTube

"A.I." is a song by American rock band OneRepublic featuring English musician Peter Gabriel. The song serves as the second promotional single and seventh track from the band's fourth studio album Oh My My. It was released September 30, 2016.

== Background and composition ==
"A.I." was written by band members Ryan Tedder and Brent Kutzle as well as Peter Gabriel and Steve Wilmot. It was produced by Tedder, Kutzle, and Wilmot. The song draws inspiration from the 2001 film A.I. Artificial Intelligence.

In an interview with Rob Copsey, Tedder acknowledged that Gabriel rarely did collaborations with other artists and said that the band spent time forming a rapport with Gabriel before they recorded the song, which Tedder described as "a long process". He also said that the band and the record label singled out "A.I." as their favorite song on Oh My My.

== Personnel ==
Musicians

- Ryan Tedder – lead vocals, background vocals
- Peter Gabriel – lead vocals
- Zach Filkins – guitar
- Drew Brown – guitar
- Brent Kutzle – bass guitar, guitar
- Eddie Fisher – drums

Production

- Tedder – production
- Kutzle – production
- Steve Wilmot – production, engineering
- Richard Chappell – engineering
- Rich Rich – engineering
- Tyler Spry – engineering
- Serban Ghenea – mixing
- John Hanes – mixing
- Chris Gehringer – mastering
