= Sons of the East =

Australian indie folk trio

- Origin: Sydney, New South Wales, Australia
- Genres: Indie folk
- Years active: 2011–present
- Label: Universal
- Members: Nic Johnston; Dan Wallage; Jack Rollins
- Website: sonsoftheeast.com

Sons of the East are an Australian indie folk trio formed in 2011 by Nic Johnston, Dan Wallage, and Jack Rollins. To date, they have released two studio albums, three EPs, and a number of singles. The trio has performed at Latitude Festival, SXSW, Colours of Ostrava, and Boardmasters Festival, among other international festivals.

== History ==
Sons of the East released their debut self-titled EP in August 2013, with the leading single "Come Away". In November 2015, they released another EP, Already Gone.

Their third release, the EP Burn Right Through, came out in 2019 and featured the singles "Nothing Comes Easy", "Silver Lining", and "It Must Be Luck". ABC's Dan Condon said of the single, "It Must Be Luck is a guaranteed starter on just about every wedding playlist from here on in", while describing the band as a "rootsy, uber-chilled group with really close-knit harmonies and really strong, pretty songs."

In September 2022, the band released their first full-length studio album, Palomar Parade, stating, "Palomar Parade is all of our favourite songs written over the last two years... Some came to us in a day, some came to us over the course of a year, but all of them shone in the sometimes-brutal process of making a record." Clunk magazine's Luke James gave the album a 4.5 star review, stating, "Palomar Parade is a beautiful album that feels like a classic rather than a debut. With hints of Van Morrison, Bob Dylan and Garth Brooks, the blend of folk and country sounds equal parts grand and intimate." The band released a deluxe version of Palomar Parade in April 2023, featuring three new songs, including the single "Ain't So Easy".

On 14 July 2023, Sons of the East issued their first standalone single of the year, "Hard to Tell". To promote it, the band undertook a forty-date tour across Europe and North America. While on tour in October of the same year, they released another single, "Head Above the Water", announcing with it a thirty-date Australian headline tour for 2024.

== Discography ==
=== Studio albums ===
List of studio albums, with selected details
Title	Details	Peak chart positions
Title	Details	AUS
Palomar Parade	Released: September 2022; Format: CD, digital, LP (April 2024); Label: Sons of the East (SOTE05)	—
Sons	Released: 13 June 2025; Format: CD, digital, LP; Label: Sons of the East (SOTE06)	81

=== EPs ===
List of EPs, with selected details
Title	Details
Sons of the East	Released: August 2013; Format: CD, digital; Label: Sons of the East (SOTE01)
Already Gone	Released: November 2015; Format: CD, digital; Label: Sons of the East (SOTE02)
Burn Right Through	Released: May 2019; Format: CD, digital, 10" LP; Label: Sons of the East (SOTE04)

=== Compilations ===
List of compilation albums, with selected details
Title	Details
Sons of the East	Released: January 2019; Format: LP; Label: Sons of the East (SOTEV03) / Waterfront Records

== Awards and nominations ==
=== AIR Awards ===
The Australian Independent Record Awards (commonly known as the AIR Awards) is an annual awards night to recognise, promote, and celebrate the success of Australia's independent music sector.

Year	Nominee / work	Award	Result	Ref.
2026	Sons	Best Independent Blues and Roots Album or EP	Nominated	

=== ARIA Music Awards ===
The ARIA Music Awards is an annual awards ceremony that recognises excellence, innovation, and achievement across all genres of Australian music.

Year	Nominee / work	Award	Result	Ref.
2025	Sons	Best Blues & Roots Album	Nominated	
