= Gardiner Sisters =

US musical ensemble

- Origin: Concord, North Carolina, United States
- Genres: Pop; acoustic
- Years active: 2009–2021 (Note: Indefinite hiatus)
- Label: Unsigned
- Members: Hailey Gardiner (Note: Hailey died on February 8, 2025 during an emergency surgery.); Mandi Gardiner; Lindsay Gardiner; Abby Gardiner; Lucy Gardiner
- Past members: Allie Gardiner
- Website: www.youtube.com/GardinerSisters

The Gardiner Sisters are a family musical group from Concord, North Carolina. The group originally consisted of sisters Hailey, Allie, Mandi, Lindsay, Abby and Lucy Gardiner. The sisters have over 125 million views on YouTube and are one of the most popular independent music artists on Spotify with over 220 million plays.

== History ==
The music group began in 2006 when they won the Mt. Pleasant's Got Talent July 4th singing competition. In 2009 they first started posting videos of themselves singing on YouTube. Their interpretation of the song "Let It Go" from the Disney movie Frozen was one of ABC News' Top 10 favorite renditions of "Let It Go" from 2014. The Gardiner Sisters have currently released five EPs and one album with covers.

In 2017, Allie departed from the group to pursue a career in beauty and makeup.

In April 2015, Hailey released her solo EP, titled The Woods, on Earth Day. In 2019, she released another EP called 'Where the roses bloom' and a single called 'Little Star'. In 2022, Hailey pursued a career as an author and published her first novel titled The Retreat. Gardiner has published 7 books in total, specifically in the genre of romantic-comedy.

On February 8, 2025 Hailey died during an emergency surgery for blood clots in her lungs. At the time of her death, she was 32 years old and was pregnant with her 3rd child. Gardiner is survived by her husband and her 2 sons.

== Members ==
- Hailey Camille (née Gardiner) Brown | b. August 27, 1992 | d. February 8, 2025
- Amanda “Mandi” Claire Gardiner | b. September 1, 1995
- Lindsay Elizabeth Gardiner | b. June 25, 1999
- Abbigail “Abby” Marie Gardiner | b. January 7, 2002.
- Lucy Violette Gardiner | b. March 7, 2008

Past members

- Alexandra "Allie" Jane (Gardiner) Glines | b. February 19, 1994

== Discography ==
EPs

- Gardiner Sisters (2009)
- Merry Christmas (2013)
- L.O.V.E. (2014)
- Better (2014)
- Nearer To Thee (2016)

Albums

- Covers Volume 1 (2018)
