= Kids (OneRepublic song) =

2016 single by OneRepublic

Single by OneRepublic

from the album Oh My My
- Released: August 12, 2016
- Studio: Ritz-Carlton (Tokyo); St. Regis Mexico City (Mexico)
- Genre: Pop rock Synth-rock
- Length: 4:00 (album version); 3:50 (radio edit)
- Label: Mosley; Interscope
- Songwriters: Ryan Tedder; Brent Kutzle; Brandon Michael Collins; Steve Wilmot
- Producers: Ryan Tedder; Brent Kutzle; Steve Wilmot

OneRepublic singles chronology
"Wherever I Go" (2016)	"Kids" (2016)	"Let's Hurt Tonight" (2016)

Music video
- "Kids" on YouTube

"Kids" is a song recorded by American pop rock band OneRepublic as the second single from their fourth studio album, Oh My My (2016). The single's title and artwork were officially announced on the band's Twitter account on August 3, 2016. The song was released August 12, 2016 and its music video was released on August 25, 2016. The song was used by Chrysler in their "PacifiKids" 2016 Christmas commercial. A remix by Seeb was released on November 18, 2016.

== Composition ==
The song has been described as having a pop rhythm with an "electro" tinge. Ryan Tedder, the lead vocalist of OneRepublic, told Entertainment Weekly that "the song was inspired by the sweeping, 80s-style synthpop of acts like M83".

The song is written in the key of D major with a common time tempo of 100 beats per minute. The vocals span from E_{3} to F#_{5} in the song.

== Music video ==
The official music video was released on August 25, 2016, through Vevo. It was directed by Hal Kirkland and produced by Here Be Dragons. The video featured the band members (except Drew Brown) in Mexico City. Views of the Angel of Independence, Soumaya Museum, Palace of Fine Arts, and the Monument to the Revolution were seen in the video. It follows the story of a young couple meeting and attending a OneRepublic concert in an outdoor alleyway. A virtual reality version of the music video, created with the Nokia OZO, was also produced. The music video has currently received more than 84 million views.

== Track listing ==
Digital download
No.	Title	Length
1.	"Kids"	4:00

Digital download — acoustic version
No.	Title	Length
1.	"Kids" (acoustic)	3:40

CD single
No.	Title	Length
1.	"Kids"	4:00
2.	"Wherever I Go" (Danny Dove radio edit)	3:08

== Charts ==
=== Weekly charts ===
Chart (2016–2017)	Peak position
Australia (ARIA)	63
Austria (Ö3 Austria Top 40)	55
Canada AC (Billboard)	45
Canada Hot AC (Billboard)	39
Czech Republic Airplay (ČNS IFPI)	21
Czech Republic Singles Digital (ČNS IFPI)	72
Denmark Airplay (Tracklisten)	11
France (SNEP)	153
Germany (GfK)	71
Hungary (Single Top 40)	30
Ireland (IRMA)	66
Italy (FIMI)	70
New Zealand Heatseekers (Recorded Music NZ)	1
Portugal (AFP)	89
Scottish Singles Sales (Official Charts)	18
Slovakia Airplay (ČNS IFPI)	54
Slovakia Singles Digital (ČNS IFPI)	73
Slovenia (SloTop50)	32
Spain (Promusicae)	26
Sweden (Sverigetopplistan)	63
Switzerland (Schweizer Hitparade)	45
UK Singles (Official Charts)	58
US Billboard Hot 100	96
US Adult Pop Airplay (Billboard)	17
US Pop Airplay (Billboard)	27

=== Year-end charts ===
Chart (2016)	Peak position
UK Cross Rhythms Annual Chart	15

== Certifications ==
Region	Certification	Certified units/sales
Australia (ARIA)	Gold	35,000^{‡}
Brazil (Pro-Música Brasil)	Gold	30,000^{‡}
Italy (FIMI)	Platinum	50,000^{‡}
New Zealand (RMNZ)	Gold	15,000^{‡}
United Kingdom (BPI)	Silver	200,000^{‡}
United States (RIAA)	Gold	500,000^{‡}
^{‡} Sales+streaming figures based on certification alone.

== Release date ==
Region	Date	Format	Label
Worldwide	August 12, 2016	Digital download	Mosley Music Group; Interscope Records
United States	November 1, 2016	Mainstream radio	Mosley Music Group; Interscope Records
