= Collateral Beauty =

2016 American drama film by David Frankel

- Theatrical release poster
- Directed by: David Frankel
- Written by: Allan Loeb
- Produced by: Bard Dorros; Michael Sugar; Allan Loeb; Anthony Bregman; Kevin Frakes
- Starring: Will Smith; Edward Norton; Keira Knightley; Michael Peña; Naomie Harris; Jacob Latimore; Kate Winslet; Helen Mirren
- Cinematography: Maryse Alberti
- Edited by: Andrew Marcus
- Music by: Theodore Shapiro
- Production companies: New Line Cinema; Village Roadshow Pictures; RatPac-Dune Entertainment; Overbrook Entertainment; Anonymous Content; PalmStar Media; Likely Story
- Distributed by: Warner Bros. Pictures
- Release dates: December 13, 2016 (Dubai); December 16, 2016 (United States)
- Running time: 97 minutes
- Country: United States
- Language: English
- Budget: $36–40.3 million
- Box office: $88.5 million

Collateral Beauty is a 2016 American fantasy drama film directed by David Frankel and written by Allan Loeb. The film stars an ensemble cast of Will Smith, Edward Norton, Keira Knightley, Michael Peña, Naomie Harris, Jacob Latimore, Kate Winslet, and Helen Mirren.

The story follows Howard Inlet, a successful New York advertising executive who suffers a great tragedy, and retreats from life where he seeks answers from the universe by writing letters to Love, Time, and Death. Receiving unexpected personal responses, he begins to see how these things interlock and how even loss can reveal moments of meaning and beauty.

Collateral Beauty premiered at the Dubai International Film Festival on December 13, 2016, and was released in the United States on December 16, 2016. It was panned by critics, but grossed $88 million worldwide against its net $36 million budget.

== Plot ==
Successful advertising executive Howard Inlet makes a motivating speech in his office to his employees. To pass through the day with enthusiasm, they should always remember three important life concepts, namely "Love", "Time", and "Death". However, three years later, Howard's spirit has faded and he is clinically depressed after his young daughter's death. He becomes withdrawn, rarely sleeping or eating, and at work, building domino chains and structures.

Howard's estranged friends and business partners Whit Yardsham, Claire Wilson, and Simon Scott fear for Howard's health and their company's future. His behavior has cost them numerous high-profile clients and left them on the verge of bankruptcy. As the majority shareholder, Howard blocks them from selling the company.

The trio hires private investigator Sally Price hoping to prove Howard is unfit to take control of the company. She intercepts three letters written by him, addressed to the abstract concepts of Love, Time, and Death, and presents them to the group. Whit, Claire, and Simon hire three struggling actors – Amy, Raffi, and Brigitte – to personify the abstracts respectively to confront Howard about his letters. Sally will film these encounters and then digitally erase the actors to make Howard appear mentally unbalanced.

In preparation for their roles, Brigitte, Raffi, and Amy spend time with Simon, Claire, and Whit, who have their own personal problems: Simon is secretly battling cancer; Whit is struggling to connect with his pre-teen daughter Allison after cheating on her mother; and Claire is looking for sperm donors to conceive a child.

After encountering "Love", "Time" and "Death", Howard attends a grief support group where Madeleine befriends him; she has lost her own daughter, Olivia, to cancer, which led to the end of her marriage. She shows him a note from her husband, "If only we could be strangers again..." and continues enigmatically "And now we are." Howard tells her about his recent "conversations" with Death, Time, and Love. Madeleine tells him that on the day Olivia died, an old woman at the hospital had suggested she notice the "collateral beauty", which she has learned to recognize as acts of selfless kindness following tragedies.

As the group discusses the actors' performances, Amy storms out, feeling guilty about manipulating Howard. Whit goes to convince her to return, declaring romantic interest in her. She rejects him but agrees to commit to the plan if he makes amends with his daughter. Simon confides with Brigitte about his condition and fear of death. She encourages him to share the burden with his loved ones.

"Love", "Time", and "Death" confront Howard again, but he lashes out at them, particularly Love, externalizing the pain he has held inside since the death. She tells him he owes it to his daughter's existence to love as he cannot live without it.

The next day, Howard attends a meeting with his company's board of directors in which footage of the incidents, with the actors digitally removed, is shown. Howard realizes his mental state and behavior are ruining the company, so expresses his gratitude for everything his friends have done for him, promising to support them. He then signs the documents to sell the agency.

Simon tells his wife about the cancer, who comforts him, revealing she knew. Raffi tells Claire she will make a good mother someday. She says time has caught up to her, but he insists her battle with time is not over yet, mentioning people who had had a positive effect on his young life. Whit visits Allison at school who, although initially angry and refusing to speak to him, he expresses his love for her, vows to return every day regardless. Allison reconsiders, and in parting, reveals "tomorrow is a half day of school".

Howard visits Madeleine on Christmas Eve, who persuades him to watch a video of her husband playing with their daughter. Her husband turns out to be Howard playing dominoes with their daughter Olivia. He breaks down and finally says his daughter's name and cause of death, and hugs Madeleine. Brigitte is revealed to be the woman who had told Madeleine about collateral beauty.

Howard and Madeleine walk hand-in-hand through Central Park. He turns and sees Amy, Raffi, and Brigitte watching from a footbridge, but Madeleine does not see them, implying they either went away or they were truly Love, Time and Death.

== Cast ==
- Will Smith as Howard Inlet
- Kate Winslet as Claire Wilson
- Edward Norton as Whit Yardsham
- Michael Peña as Simon Scott
- Helen Mirren as Brigitte / "Death"
- Keira Knightley as Amy / "Love"
- Jacob Latimore as Raffi / "Time"
- Naomie Harris as Madeleine
- Ann Dowd as Sally Price
- Mary Beth Peil as Mrs. Yardsham, Whit's mother
- Raymond Greene-Joyner as Mr. Yardsham, Whit's father
- Shirley Rumierk as Mrs. Scott, Simon's wife

== Production ==
=== Development and casting ===
On May 13, 2015, it was announced that Hugh Jackman and Rooney Mara would star in the New York-set drama Collateral Beauty, to be directed by Alfonso Gomez-Rejon and written by Allan Loeb. Loeb wrote the script on spec, saying, "It's something that I've meditated on for a couple of years, the idea of someone who's been through a terrible loss and was angry and twice destroyed and wrote letters to the Universe. I didn't know why or how or what that meant for years, but it wouldn't leave me alone." Michael Sugar and Bard Dorros were set to produce through their Anonymous Content banner. On June 9, 2015, PalmStar Media's Kevin Frakes came on board to produce and fully finance the film, and Likely Story was also on board to co-produce the film, with Loeb also producing. On June 15, 2015, Variety reported that Jason Segel was in talks to join the cast. On July 15, 2015, it was announced that Jackman had exited the project due to his commitment with 20th Century Fox's Logan, and producers were eyeing Johnny Depp to star instead.

On August 4, 2015, Will Smith was cast to play the lead, replacing Jackman, while Smith's Overbrook Entertainment was set to also produce the film. On September 8, 2015, it was announced that New Line Cinema had come on board to handle worldwide distribution for the film, while Mara had left the project. On October 5, 2015, Gomez-Rejon exited the film due to creative differences with the studio. On November 10, 2015, it was announced that David Frankel was nearing a deal to direct the film. On December 1, 2015, Variety reported that Helen Mirren was in early talks to join the cast, with filming expected to begin early 2016 in New York City. On January 14, 2016, The Wrap reported that Edward Norton, Michael Peña, and Naomie Harris were cast in the film, while Rachel McAdams was in negotiations to join as well. Village Roadshow Pictures was set to co-finance the film. On February 9, 2016, Keira Knightley joined the film, and Kate Winslet was also cast the next day. Enrique Murciano was spotted filming along with Winslet, while Jacob Latimore also joined the film. On March 10, 2016, Ann Dowd signed on to co-star.

=== Filming ===
Principal photography on the film began on February 22, 2016, in Queens in New York City and Manhattan. On March 10, 2016, filming took place at the Whitney Museum of American Art.

=== Music ===
The soundtrack includes five songs in addition to the original score by Theodore Shapiro:

- "Way Down We Go", performed by Kaleo, written by Jakull Juliusson
- "Looking Too Closely", performed by Fink, written by Finian Greenall, Timothy Thornton, and Guy Whitaker
- "World of Love", performed by Sharon Jones & The Dap Kings, written by Franklin Stribling
- "Oh What a Beautiful City", performed by Bryan Terrell Clark and Mykal Kilgore, arranged by Dave Van Ronk
- "Let's Hurt Tonight", performed by OneRepublic, written and produced by Ryan Tedder and Noel Zancanella

"Let's Hurt Tonight" was confirmed to be on the soundtrack album in November 2016. A music video for the song, featuring scenes from the film, was released on December 6, 2016.

== Release ==
Collateral Beauty was released by Warner Bros. Pictures on December 16, 2016.

=== Box office ===
Collateral Beauty grossed $31 million in the United States and Canada and $57.2 million in other territories for a worldwide total of $88.2 million, against a production budget of $36 million.

The film was released alongside Rogue One and the wide expansion of Manchester by the Sea, and was initially expected to gross $11–13 million from 3,028 theaters in its opening weekend, on par with Smith's 2015 drama Concussion. It made $2.4 million on its first day, lowering weekend projections to $7.5 million. It ended up grossing $7.1 million, finishing 4th at the box office and marking the lowest opening of Will Smith's career.

=== Critical response ===
On Rotten Tomatoes, the film has an approval percentage of 14% based on 184 reviews, with the critics consensus reading: "Well-meaning but fundamentally flawed, Collateral Beauty aims for uplift but collapses in unintentional hilarity." On Metacritic, the film has a score of 23 out of 100 based on 40 critic reviews, meaning "Generally Unfavorable". Audiences polled by CinemaScore gave the film an average grade of "A−" on an A+ to F scale.

Vince Mancini of Uproxx criticized the film for its misleading trailers and dialogue, writing, "Edward Norton's character tells Keira Knightley's about holding his now-estranged daughter (he's a workaholic!) in his arms for the first time. 'It wasn't that I felt love, it was that I felt like I had become love'." Richard Roeper gave the film one out of four stars, saying, "Collateral Beauty is a fraud. It is built on a foundation so contrived, so off-putting, so treacly, the most miraculous thing about this movie is this movie was actually made."

=== Accolades ===
| Award | Date of ceremony | Category | Recipients | Result | Ref. |
|---|---|---|---|---|---|
| Hollywood Film Awards | November 6, 2016 | Hollywood Breakout Performance Award | Naomie Harris (also for Moonlight) | Won | |
| London Film Critics' Circle | January 22, 2017 | British/Irish Actress of the Year | Naomie Harris (also for Moonlight and Our Kind of Traitor) | Nominated | |
| NAACP Image Awards | February 11, 2017 | Outstanding Actor in a Motion Picture | Will Smith | Nominated | |
| Golden Raspberry Awards | February 25, 2017 | Worst Screen Combo | The entire cast of "once respected actors" | Nominated | |
