= Native Tour =

2013–15 concert tour by OneRepublic

- Tour by OneRepublic
- Promotional poster for the tour
- Location: Africa; Asia; Europe; North America; South America; Oceania
- Associated album: Native
- Start date: April 2, 2013
- End date: September 20, 2015
- No. of shows: 203
- Box office: $36,799,000

OneRepublic concert chronology
- Good Life Tour (2010–11); Native Tour (2013–15); 16th Annual Honda Civic Tour (2017)

The Native Tour (also known as the Native Summer Tour in North America or as the Native Fall Tour in Europe) is the third headlining concert tour by American pop rock band OneRepublic, in support of their third studio album Native (2013). OneRepublic were joined on the Native Summer leg of the tour by The Script and American Authors, and on the European "Native Fall Tour" leg by Kongos. The tour has traveled across five continents: Asia, Europe, Oceania, North America, and Africa. The tour began on April 2, 2013 in Milan, Italy and ended on September 20, 2015 in São Paulo, Brazil.

== Background ==
The first North American leg was announced April 23, 2013. In September 2013, the band announced Australian and New Zealand dates. The first round for the Summer 2014 North American dates were announced in December 2013. This leg was dubbed the "Native Summer Tour". Those dates showed an influx in sales and sold out shows in major markets which surprised the band and promoters. This prompted additional dates for that leg which were announced in February 2014.

== Concert synopsis ==
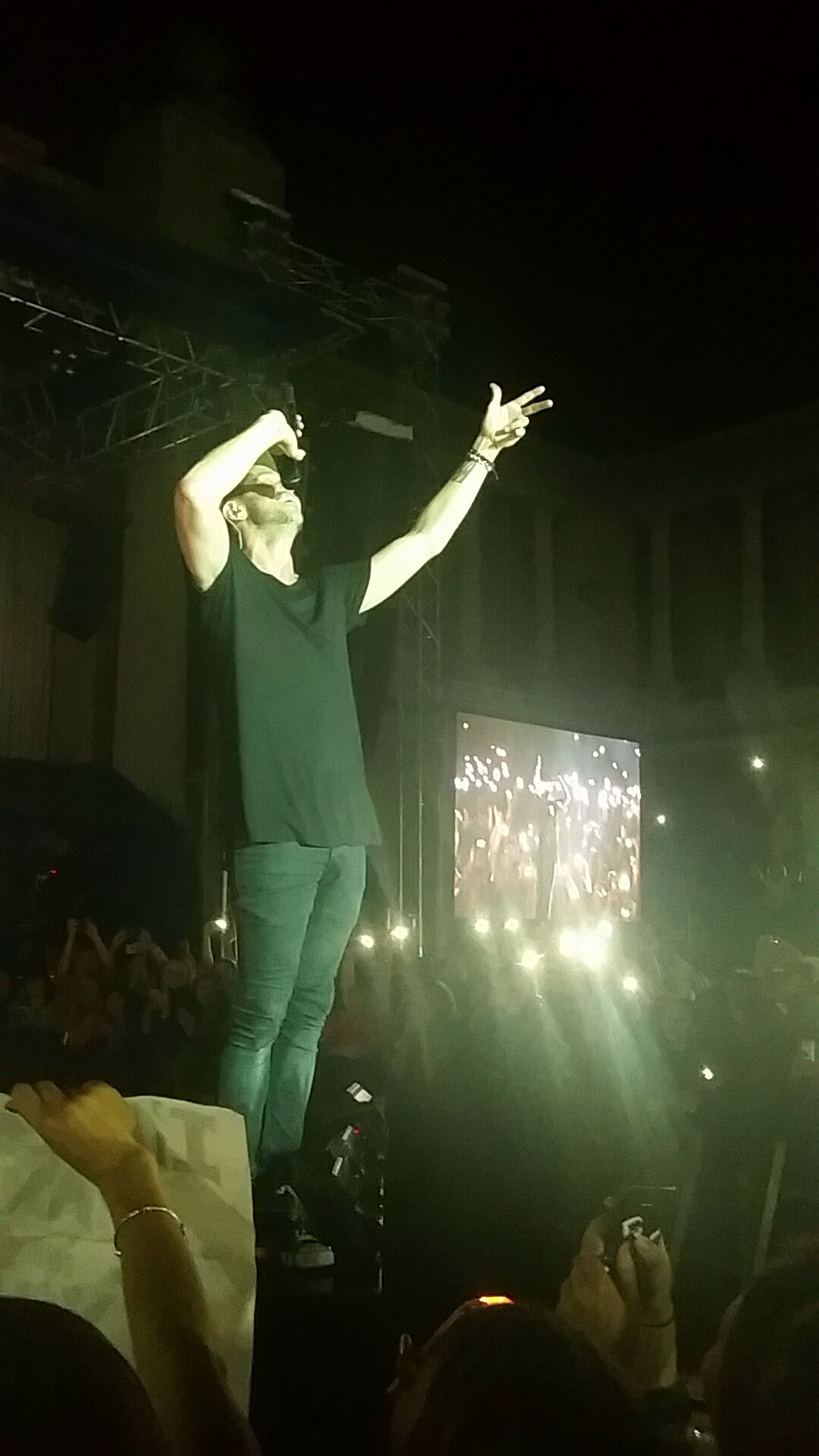
OneRepublic performing in Bucharest 4 June 4, 2015

The set begins with the band "in silhouette behind a white curtain before it was ripped away to revel an uncluttered set with a projection screen." The stage is designed with "diamond-shaped video screens, a multi-level stage" and a catwalk which leads to a B-stage on which the band plays on for a section of the show.

The set list includes the band's well-known songs and covers, such as "What a Wonderful World" (Louis Armstrong), "Take Me to Church" (Hozier) and "Budapest" by George Ezra and others.

== Opening acts ==
- The Script (Native Summer Tour)
- American Authors (Native Summer Tour)
- Lights (Native Summer Tour)
- Christina Perri
- The Makemakes (Southeastern Europe)
- Jamie Scott
- Gangs Of Ballet (South Africa)
- Kongos (Native Fall Tour)
- The Last Internationale (Italy; 2015)
- Lights (Canada)
- Harel Skaat (Tel Aviv)

== Setlists ==
The setlists below are an example as it varies from date to date.

1. "Don't Look Down"
2. "Light It Up"
3. "Secrets"
4. "All the Right Moves"
5. "What You Wanted"
6. "Stop and Stare"
7. "Something I Need"
8. "Apologize"
9. "Preacher"
10. "Come Home"
11. "Counting Stars"
12. "Can't Stop"
13. "Au Revoir"
14. "Feel Again"
15. "Good Life"
16. "I Lived"

Encore

17. "Love Runs Out"
18. "What a Wonderful World" (Louis Armstrong cover)
19. "If I Lose Myself"

North America leg 3

Canada

1. "Don't Look Down"
2. "Light It Up"
3. "Secrets"
4. "All the Right Moves"
5. "What You Wanted"
6. "Stop and Stare"
7. "Something I Need"
8. "Praise You" (Fatboy Slim cover)
9. "Apologize"/"Stay with Me" (Sam Smith cover)
10. "Budapest" (George Ezra cover)
11. "Preacher"
12. "Good Life"
13. Spanish Guitar Melody
14. "Counting Stars"
15. "Can't Stop"
16. "Au Revoir"
17. "Feel Again"
18. "I Lived"
18. "Love Runs Out"
19. "What a Wonderful World" (Louis Armstrong cover)
20. "If I Lose Myself" Alesso remix)
Asia leg 3

Tel Aviv

1. "Don't Look Down"
2. "Light It Up"
3. "Secrets"
4. "All the Right Moves"
5. "Apologize"/"Stay With Me" (Sam Smith cover)
6. "Budapest" (George Ezra cover)
7. "Preacher"
8. "Good Life"
9. Spanish Guitar Melody
10. "Counting Stars"
11. "Can't Stop"
12. "Au Revoir"
13. "Feel Again"
14. "Love Runs Out"
17. "What a Wonderful World" (Louis Armstrong cover)
18. "I Lived"
19. "If I Lose Myself"
Europe leg 4

May 30 – June 15, 2015

1. "Light It Up"
2. "Secrets"
3. "All the Right Moves"
4. "What You Wanted"
5. "Stop and Stare"
6. "Something I Need"
7. "Apologize"/"Stay With Me" (Sam Smith cover)
8. "Budapest" (George Ezra cover)
9. "Preacher"
10. "Good Life"
11. Spanish Guitar Melody
12. "Counting Stars"
13. "Can't Stop"
14. "Au Revoir"
15. "Feel Again"
16. "Good Life"
17. "I Lived"

Encore

17. "Love Runs Out"
18. "What a Wonderful World" (Louis Armstrong cover)
19. "If I Lose Myself"

== Tour dates ==
Date	City	Country	Venue	Attendance	Gross revenue
Europe Leg 1
April 2, 2013	Milan	Italy	Alcatraz	2,000 / 2,000	—N/a
April 3, 2013	Lausanne	Switzerland	Salle Metropole	—N/a	—N/a
April 5, 2013	Zürich	Switzerland	Komplex 457	—N/a	—N/a
April 6, 2013	Lauterbrunnen	Switzerland	Snowpen Air	—N/a	—N/a
April 8, 2013	Vienna	Austria	Wiener Stadthalle	16,152 / 16,152	—N/a
April 9, 2013	Munich	Germany	Zenith	—N/a	—N/a
April 10, 2013	Stuttgart	Germany	LKA-Longhorn	—N/a	—N/a
April 11, 2013	Esch-sur-Alzette	Luxembourg	Rockhal	—N/a	—N/a
April 13, 2013	Düsseldorf	Germany	Mitsubishi Electric Halle	—N/a	—N/a
April 14, 2013	Hanover	Germany	Hanover Capitol	—N/a	—N/a
April 15, 2013	Berlin	Germany	Huxley's Neue Welt	—N/a	—N/a
April 17, 2013	Offenbach	Germany	Capitol Theatre	—N/a	—N/a
April 18, 2013	Amsterdam	Netherlands	Paradiso	—N/a	—N/a
April 19, 2013	Antwerp	Belgium	Muziekcentrum	—N/a	—N/a
April 20, 2013	Paris	France	Le Trianon	—N/a	—N/a
April 24, 2013	London	England	Shepherd's Bush Empire	—N/a	—N/a
April 25, 2013	Manchester	England	The Ritz	—N/a	—N/a
April 26, 2013	Glasgow	Scotland	O_{2} Academy Glasgow	—N/a	—N/a
April 26, 2013	Belfast	Northern Ireland	Ulster Hall	—N/a	—N/a
April 30, 2013	Dublin	Ireland	Olympia	—N/a	—N/a
Africa Leg 1				—N/a	—N/a
July 13, 2013	Carthage	Tunisia	Roman Amphitheater	—N/a	—N/a
Asia Leg 1
July 14, 2013	Byblos	Lebanon	Byblos International Festival	—N/a	—N/a
North America Leg 1
July 19, 2013	Tulsa	United States	Cain's Ballroom	—N/a	—N/a
July 20, 2013	St. Louis	United States	Peabody Opera House	—N/a	—N/a
July 22, 2013	Maplewood	United States	Maplewood Myth	—N/a	—N/a
July 23, 2013	Highland Park	United States	Ravinia Pavilion	—N/a	—N/a
July 25, 2013	Columbus	United States	Lifestyle Communities Pavilion	—N/a	—N/a
July 26, 2013	Hershey	United States	Hershey Park Stadium	—N/a	—N/a
July 27, 2013	Rochester	United States	Meadow Brook Music Festival	—N/a	—N/a
August 1, 2013	Boston	United States	Bank of America Pavilion	—N/a	—N/a
August 2, 2013	Mashantucket	United States	MGM Grand Theater	—N/a	—N/a
August 3, 2013	Bethlehem	United States	Musikfest	—N/a	—N/a
August 5, 2013	Wolf Trap	United States	Filene Center	—N/a	—N/a
August 6, 2013	Hyannis	United States	Cape Cod Melody Tent	—N/a	—N/a
August 8, 2013	Big Flats	United States	Summer Stage at Tag's	—N/a	—N/a
August 9, 2013	Baltimore	United States	Pier Six Pavilion	—N/a	—N/a
August 10, 2013	New York City	United States	Hudson River Park	—N/a	—N/a
August 12, 2013	Orlando	United States	Hard Rock Universal	—N/a	—N/a
August 13, 2013	Hollywood	United States	Hard Rock Live	—N/a	—N/a
August 15, 2013	Atlanta	United States	Chastain Park	—N/a	—N/a
August 16, 2013	Charlotte	United States	Time Warner Cable Uptown Amphitheatre	—N/a	—N/a
August 18, 2013	Nashville	United States	The Woods Amphitheater at Fontanel	—N/a	—N/a
September 4, 2013	Spokane	United States	INB Performing Arts Center	—N/a	—N/a
September 6, 2013	Reno	United States	Grand Sierra Theatre	—N/a	—N/a
September 11, 2013	Los Angeles	United States	Greek Theatre	—N/a	—N/a
September 15, 2013	Phoenix	United States	Comerica Theatre	—N/a	—N/a
September 17, 2013	Albuquerque	United States	Sandia Amphitheater	—N/a	—N/a
September 19, 2013	Austin	United States	Moody Theater	—N/a	—N/a
September 20, 2013	Houston	United States	Bayou Music Center	—N/a	—N/a
September 21, 2013	Grand Prairie	United States	Verizon Theatre	—N/a	—N/a
September 29, 2013	San Francisco	United States	Sharon Meadow	—N/a	—N/a
October 11, 2013	Orlando	United States	CFE Arena	—N/a	—N/a
Asia Leg 2
October 26, 2013	Jakarta	Indonesia	Jakarta International Expo	—N/a	—N/a
October 29, 2013	Singapore		Resorts World Sentosa	—N/a	—N/a
October 31, 2013	Kuala Lumpur	Malaysia	Sunway Lagoon	—N/a	—N/a
November 2, 2013	Shanghai	China	Shanghai Grand Stage	—N/a	—N/a
November 4, 2013	Beijing	China	Workers Indoor Arena	—N/a	—N/a
November 6, 2013	Quezon City	Philippines	Smart Araneta Coliseum	—N/a	—N/a
Oceania
November 9, 2013	Perth	Australia	Metro City	—N/a	—N/a
November 11, 2013	Brisbane	Australia	The Tivoli	—N/a	—N/a
November 12, 2013	Sydney	Australia	The Star Event Centre	—N/a	—N/a
November 14, 2013	Melbourne	Australia	Palace Theatre	—N/a	—N/a
November 16, 2013	Auckland	New Zealand	Vector Arena	—N/a	—N/a
November 17, 2013	Wellington	New Zealand	TSB Bank Arena	—N/a	—N/a
Europe Leg 2
February 10, 2014	Trezzo sull'Adda	Italy	Live Club	—N/a	—N/a
February 13, 2014	Graz	Austria	Stadthalle Graz	—N/a	—N/a
February 14, 2014	Linz	Austria	TipsArena Linz	—N/a	—N/a
February 16, 2014	Prague	Czech Republic	Incheba Arena	—N/a	—N/a
February 17, 2014	Bratislava	Slovakia	Incheba	—N/a	—N/a
February 19, 2014	Bern	Switzerland	Bernexpo Halle 4	—N/a	—N/a
February 20, 2014	Frankfurt	Germany	Jahrhunderthalle	—N/a	—N/a
February 22, 2014	Cologne	Germany	Paladium	—N/a	—N/a
February 23, 2014	Cologne	Germany	Paladium	—N/a	—N/a
February 25, 2014	Stuttgart	Germany	Porsche-Arena	—N/a	—N/a
February 26, 2014	Munich	Germany	Zenith	—N/a	—N/a
February 28, 2014	Berlin	Germany	Columbiahalle	—N/a	—N/a
March 1, 2014	Hamburg	Germany	Sporthalle Hamburg	—N/a	—N/a
March 3, 2014	Amsterdam	Netherlands	Heineken Music Hall	—N/a	—N/a
March 6, 2014	Paris	France	Le Trianon	—N/a	—N/a
March 7, 2014	Paris	France	Le Trianon	—N/a	—N/a
March 8, 2014	Paris	France	Le Trianon	—N/a	—N/a
March 11, 2014	Stockholm	Sweden	Arenan/Fryshuset	—N/a	—N/a
March 12, 2014	Copenhagen	Denmark	Falkoner Center	—N/a	—N/a
March 14, 2014	Esch-sur-Alzette	Luxembourg	Rockhal	—N/a	—N/a
March 16, 2014	London	England	Roundhouse	—N/a	—N/a
March 17, 2014	Bristol	England	O_{2} Academy Bristol	—N/a	—N/a
March 18, 2014	Birmingham	England	O_{2} Academy Birmingham	—N/a	—N/a
March 20, 2014	Leeds	England	O_{2} Academy Leeds	—N/a	—N/a
March 21, 2014	Manchester	England	Manchester Academy	—N/a	—N/a
March 22, 2014	Glasgow	Scotland	O_{2} Academy Glasgow	—N/a	—N/a
March 24, 2014	Dublin	Ireland	Olympia Theatre	3,163 / 3,163	$117,653
North America Leg 2-Native Summer Tour
May 28, 2014	Morrison	United States	Red Rocks Amphitheatre	—N/a	—N/a
May 29, 2014	Morrison	United States	Red Rocks Amphitheatre	—N/a	—N/a
May 31, 2014	Albuquerque	United States	Isleta Amphitheater	—N/a	—N/a
June 1, 2014	Phoenix	United States	Ak-Chin Pavilion	—N/a	—N/a
June 2, 2014	Chula Vista	United States	Sleep Train Amphitheatre	—N/a	—N/a
June 3, 2014	Irvine	United States	Verizon Wireless Amphitheatre	—N/a	—N/a
June 5, 2014	Los Angeles	United States	Hollywood Bowl	—N/a	—N/a
June 6, 2014	Mountain View	United States	Shoreline Amphitheatre	—N/a	—N/a
June 7, 2014	Concord	United States	Sleep Train Pavilion	—N/a	—N/a
June 8, 2014	Wheatland	United States	Sleep Train Amphitheatre	—N/a	—N/a
June 10, 2014	Ridgefield	United States	Sleep Country Amphitheater	—N/a	—N/a
June 12, 2014	Everett	United States	Comcast Arena	—N/a	—N/a
June 13, 2014	Boise	United States	Taco Bell Arena	—N/a	—N/a
June 14, 2014	West Valley City	United States	USANA Amphitheatre	—N/a	—N/a
June 17, 2014	Minneapolis	United States	Target Center	9,868 / 9,868	$416,953
June 18, 2014	Highland Park	United States	Highland Pavilion	—N/a	—N/a
June 19, 2014	Highland Park	United States	Highland Pavilion	—N/a	—N/a
June 21, 2014	Clarkston	United States	DTE Energy Music Theatre	14,569 / 14,569	$414,961
June 22, 2014	Toronto	Canada	Molson Canadian Amphitheatre	—N/a	—N/a
June 24, 2014	Boston	United States	Blue Hills Bank Pavilion	—N/a	—N/a
June 25, 2014	Boston	United States	Blue Hills Bank Pavilion	—N/a	—N/a
June 27, 2014	Bristow	United States	Jiffy Lube Live	—N/a	—N/a
June 28, 2014	Camden	United States	Susquehanna Bank Center	—N/a	—N/a
June 29, 2014	Wantagh	United States	Nikon at Jones Beach Theater	—N/a	—N/a
Latin America
July 26, 2014	Mexico City	Mexico	Palacio de los Deportes	10,471 / 13,415	$543,255
North America
July 30, 2014	Omaha	United States	CenturyLink Center Omaha	—N/a	—N/a
August 1, 2014	Kansas City	United States	Starlight Theatre	—N/a	—N/a
August 2, 2014	Maryland Heights	United States	Verizon Wireless Amphitheater	—N/a	—N/a
August 3, 2014	Noblesville	United States	Klipsch Music Center	—N/a	—N/a
August 5, 2014	Cincinnati	United States	Riverbend Music Center	—N/a	—N/a
August 6, 2014	Cuyahoga Falls	United States	Blossom Music Center	—N/a	—N/a
August 8, 2014	Burgettstown	United States	First Niagara Pavilion	—N/a	—N/a
August 9, 2014	Darien	United States	Darien Lake PAC	—N/a	—N/a
August 10, 2014	Holmdel	United States	PNC Bank Arts Center	—N/a	—N/a
August 12, 2014	Virginia Beach	United States	Farm Bureau Live	—N/a	—N/a
August 13, 2014	Raleigh	United States	Walnut Creek Amphitheatre	—N/a	—N/a
August 14, 2014	Charlotte	United States	PNC Music Pavilion	—N/a	—N/a
August 16, 2014	Tampa	United States	MidFlorida Credit Union Amphitheatre	—N/a	—N/a
August 17, 2014	West Palm Beach	United States	Cruzan Amphitheatre	—N/a	—N/a
August 19, 2014	Atlanta	United States	Aaron's Amphitheatre	—N/a	—N/a
August 21, 2014	New Orleans	United States	UNO Lakefront Arena	—N/a	—N/a
August 22, 2014	The Woodlands	United States	Cynthia Woods Mitchell Pavilion	—N/a	—N/a
August 23, 2014	Austin	United States	Austin360 Amphitheater	—N/a	—N/a
August 25, 2014	San Antonio	United States	Freeman Coliseum	—N/a	—N/a
August 26, 2014	Dallas	United States	Gexa Energy Pavilion	—N/a	—N/a
August 28, 2014	Tulsa	United States	BOK Center	7,561 / 8,251	$374,585
September 1, 2014	Morrison	United States	Red Rocks Amphitheatre	—N/a	—N/a
Europe Leg 3
October 19, 2014	Dublin	Ireland	3Arena	6,340 / 8,277	$357,111
October 21, 2014	Liverpool	England	EchoTwo	—N/a	—N/a
October 22, 2014	London	England	The O_{2} Arena	9,136 / 9,917	$473,885
October 24, 2014	Paris	France	Zénith Paris	—N/a	—N/a
October 25, 2014	Antwerp	Belgium	Lotto Arena	5,649 / 7,348	$257,287
October 27, 2014	Hamburg	Germany	O_{2} World Hamburg	7,704 / 8,414	$343,632
October 28, 2014	Oberhausen	Germany	König Pilsener Arena	—N/a	—N/a
October 30, 2014	Frankfurt	Germany	Festhalle Frankfurt	—N/a	—N/a
October 31, 2014	Nürnberg	Germany	Arena Nürnberger Versicherung	—N/a	—N/a
November 2, 2014	Warsaw	Poland	Torwar Hall	—N/a	—N/a
November 3, 2014	Vilnius	Lithuania	Siemens Arena	—N/a	—N/a
November 5, 2014	Minsk	Belarus	Minsk Sports Palace	—N/a	—N/a
November 7, 2014	Moscow	Russia	Stadium Live	—N/a	—N/a
November 9, 2014	St. Petersburg	Russia	A2 Arena	—N/a	—N/a
November 11, 2014	Tallinn	Estonia	Saku Suurhall Arena	—N/a	—N/a
November 12, 2014	Riga	Latvia	Arena Riga	—N/a	—N/a
November 14, 2014	Prague	Czech Republic	O_{2} Arena	—N/a	—N/a
November 15, 2014	Vienna	Austria	Wiener Stadthalle	—N/a	—N/a
November 16, 2014	Ljubljana	Slovenia	Arena Stožice	—N/a	—N/a
November 17, 2014	Milan	Italy	Mediolanum Forum	11,000 / 11,000	—N/a
November 19, 2014	Barcelona	Spain	Palau Sant Jordi	—N/a	—N/a
November 20, 2014	Madrid	Spain	Palacio de Deportes de la Comunidad	—N/a	—N/a
November 21, 2014	Lisbon	Portugal	MEO Arena	—N/a	—N/a
North America Leg 3
April 18, 2015	Quebec City	Canada	Colisée Pepsi	5,668 / 6,828	$297,080
April 20, 2015	Montreal	Canada	Bell Centre	7,295 / 8,576	$380,239
April 21, 2015	Ottawa	Canada	Canadian Tire Centre	—N/a	—N/a
April 22, 2015	London	Canada	Budweiser Gardens	5,657 / 6,836	$258,755
April 24, 2015	Toronto	Canada	Air Canada Centre	11,057 / 11,057	$509,497
April 25, 2015	Sudbury	Canada	Sudbury Arena	—N/a	—N/a
April 27, 2015	Winnipeg	Canada	MTS Centre	—N/a	—N/a
April 29, 2015	Edmonton	Canada	Rexall Place	—N/a	—N/a
April 30, 2015	Calgary	Canada	Scotiabank Saddledome	—N/a	—N/a
May 2, 2015	Vancouver	Canada	Rogers Arena	—N/a	—N/a
Asia Leg 3
May 28, 2015	Tel Aviv	Israel	Hayarkon Park	20,000	—N/a
Europe Leg 4
May 30, 2015	Istanbul	Turkey	Volkswagen Arena	—N/a	—N/a
June 1, 2015	Skopje	Macedonia	Boris Trajkovski Sports Center	10,000	—N/a
June 2, 2015	Sofia	Bulgaria	Arena Armeec	10,000	—N/a
June 4, 2015	Bucharest	Romania	Arenele Romane	—N/a	—N/a
June 6, 2015	Belgrade	Serbia	Kombank Arena	20,000	—N/a
June 7, 2015	Budapest	Hungary	Papp László Budapest Sportaréna	—N/a	—N/a
June 8, 2015	Linz	Austria	Castle Clam	—N/a	—N/a
June 9, 2015	Padua	Italy	Company Arena	—N/a	—N/a
June 11, 2015	Geneva	Switzerland	SEG Geneva Arena	—N/a	—N/a
June 12, 2015	Zurich	Switzerland	Hallenstadion	13,000 / 13,000	$947,804
June 13, 2015	Germersheim	Germany	Insel in Concert	—N/a	—N/a
June 14, 2015	Landgraaf	Netherlands	Pinkpop Festival	—N/a	—N/a
June 15, 2015	Esch-sur-Alzette	Luxembourg	Rockhal	—N/a	—N/a
Africa Leg 2
June 19, 2015	Johannesburg	South Africa	Coca-Cola Dome	—N/a	—N/a
June 21, 2015	Cape Town	South Africa	Grand West Arena	—N/a	—N/a
Europe Leg 5
July 10, 2015	London	England	Wembley Arena	—N/a	—N/a
July 12, 2015	London	England	Wembley Arena	—N/a	—N/a
North America Leg 4
July 25, 2015	Grand Rapids	United States	Van Andel Arena	4,758 / 8,364	$244,275
Latin America
September 18, 2015	Rio de Janeiro	Brazil	Rock in Rio	85,000	—N/a
September 20, 2015	São Paulo	Brazil	Espaço das Américas	4,231 / 6,000	$162,772
Total				155,279 / 173,035	$6,099,744

=== Cancelled shows ===
Date	City	Country	Venue
July 28, 2013	Hopewell	United States	CMAC
July 30, 2013	Newport	United States	Newport Yachting Center
September 12, 2015	Santiago	Chile	Movistar Arena
September 15, 2015	Buenos Aires	Argentina	Luna Park

== Personnel ==
Band

- Ryan Tedder — Lead vocals, piano, acoustic guitar
- Zach Filkins — Lead guitar, viola, acoustic guitar, tambourine, backing vocals, percussion
- Drew Brown — Rhythm guitar, acoustic guitar, keyboard, glockenspiel, piano, tambourine, backing vocals
- Eddie Fisher — Drums, percussion
- Brent Kutzle — Bass guitar, cello, acoustic guitar, tambourine, backing vocals
- Brian Willett — Analog synthesizer, percussion, keyboards, backing vocals

Crew

- AJ Pen — Lighting director
- Zito — Production manager

== Broadcastings ==
The August 9, 2014, show in Holmdel was streamed live on Yahoo.com. From May 30 to June 15, 2015, they streamed the show on merkaat.com during the closing song, "If I Lose Myself" and the after show backstage. The band also released a film of their concert in Johannesburg, entitled Live In South Africa on DVD and Blu-ray.

== Critical reception ==
Stephanie March of the Denver Post's Reverb says, "the band quickly showed why it deserved the two night sellout by transitioning with finesse into "Secrets" from "Waking Up"." Kevin C. Johnson of the St. Louis Post-Dispatch says that, "the show was nothing special, yet came off totally like able." "Early songs such as "Secrets", "All the Right Moves", "What You Wanted" and "Stop and Stare" felt a little slow to lift off but the show gained its right momentum before long." The Pittsburgh Post-Gazette's Ebony Martins' review of the show was; "If there is any chance that music exists in heaven, there's a good chance that heavens heard Ryan Tedder's a cappella falsettos Friday night at the First Niagara Pavilion." "Dressed in all black, Mr. Tedder was clearly the rock star of the night, swinging his signature fedora hat on and off during songs, bouncing on speakers, jumping on the piano for a few songs and blessing fans with his lyrical genius." Lynn Saxberg from the Ottawa Citizen says, "Fans were bedazzled by the slick production." Saxberg was happy that there was nothing to distract the band's musicianship which was "top-notch level". One highlight was during "Preacher" a song that "Tedder wrote for his grandfather." Mike Ross, of the Edmonton Sun said, OneRepublic wowed the crowd at Rexall Place and delivered. He praised front man Tedder for his powerhouse vocals, ability to play the piano, and write songs "with a catchy hook, an anthemic U2-ian chorus and some kind of empowering inspirational message". He also praised the other band members talent for playing a variety of instruments.
