= JBS (singer) =

German singer and songwriter

- Also known as: JBS, JBS Beats
- Born: Jan Bennet Schemmer; 27 November 2005 (age 19); Ibbenbüren, Germany
- Genres: new wave, synth-pop, indie rock
- Instrument: Vocals
- Years active: 2023–present
- Labels: Warner Music

Jan Bennet Schemmer (born 27 November 2005), better known as JBS, is a German singer, songwriter and music producer.

== Life ==
Schemmer started playing the guitar at the age of six, he then played in a student band when he was 11. In 2021 he took up beat production, tried his hand at different genres and first started rapping and singing. Since then his style is cross-genre, but largely subordinate to new wave, synth-pop and indie rock.

In 2023 he changed his stage name from JBS Beats to JBS, winning the Sparkassen Nachwuchspreis Kultur in the Steinfurt district. That year he realised his first single with Warner Music, called Unendlichkeit and featuring MilleniumKid. The song became a hit months after being released.

== Discography ==
=== Extended plays ===
List of EPs, with selected details
Title	Information
Outrun	Released: 21 February 2025; Publisher: Universal Music
