= Let's Hurt Tonight =

2016 single by OneRepublic

Single by OneRepublic

from the album Oh My My
- Released: December 6, 2016
- Recorded: 2014
- Studio: Revolution Recording (Toronto, Ontario); Corinthia (London)
- Genre: Pop rock; folk rock
- Length: 3:14 (album version); 3:15 (music video); 3:22 (Collateral Beauty mix)
- Label: Mosley; Interscope
- Songwriters: Ryan Tedder; Brent Kutzle; Brandon Michael Collins; Steve Wilmot
- Producers: Ryan Tedder; Brent Kutzle; Steve Wilmot

OneRepublic singles chronology
"Kids" (2016)	"Let's Hurt Tonight" (2016)	"No Vacancy" (2017)

"Let's Hurt Tonight" is a song by American pop rock band OneRepublic. It was released as the third single from their fourth studio album, Oh My My on December 6, 2016, along with its music video. The song was included in the 2016 film Collateral Beauty. It has since reached the top 100 in Austria and Germany, and the top 50 in Switzerland.

== Track listing ==
Digital download – Collateral Beauty version
No.	Title	Length
1.	"Let's Hurt Tonight" (Collateral Beauty Mix)	3:29

Digital download – BUNT. remix version
No.	Title	Length
1.	"Let's Hurt Tonight" (BUNT. remix)	3:51

== Music video ==
As of June 2018, there are two music videos for the song. One music video, released on December 6, 2016, featuring scenes from Collateral Beauty, has over 113 million views, while another version, released on February 16, 2017, without scenes from the movie, has over 5 million views.

== Charts ==
=== Weekly charts ===
Chart (2016–17)	Peak position
Austria (Ö3 Austria Top 40)	61
Canada Hot AC (Billboard)	50
Germany (GfK)	98
Italy (FIMI)	19
Slovenia Airplay (SloTop50)	30
Switzerland (Schweizer Hitparade)	26
US Adult Pop Airplay (Billboard)	21

=== Year-end charts ===
Chart (2017)	Position
Italy (FIMI)	100
Latvia Airplay (LaIPA)	100

== Certifications ==
Region	Certification	Certified units/sales
Brazil (Pro-Música Brasil)	Gold	30,000^{‡}
Italy (FIMI)	2× Platinum	100,000^{‡}
United States (RIAA)	Gold	500,000^{‡}
^{‡} Sales+streaming figures based on certification alone.
