= Train discography =

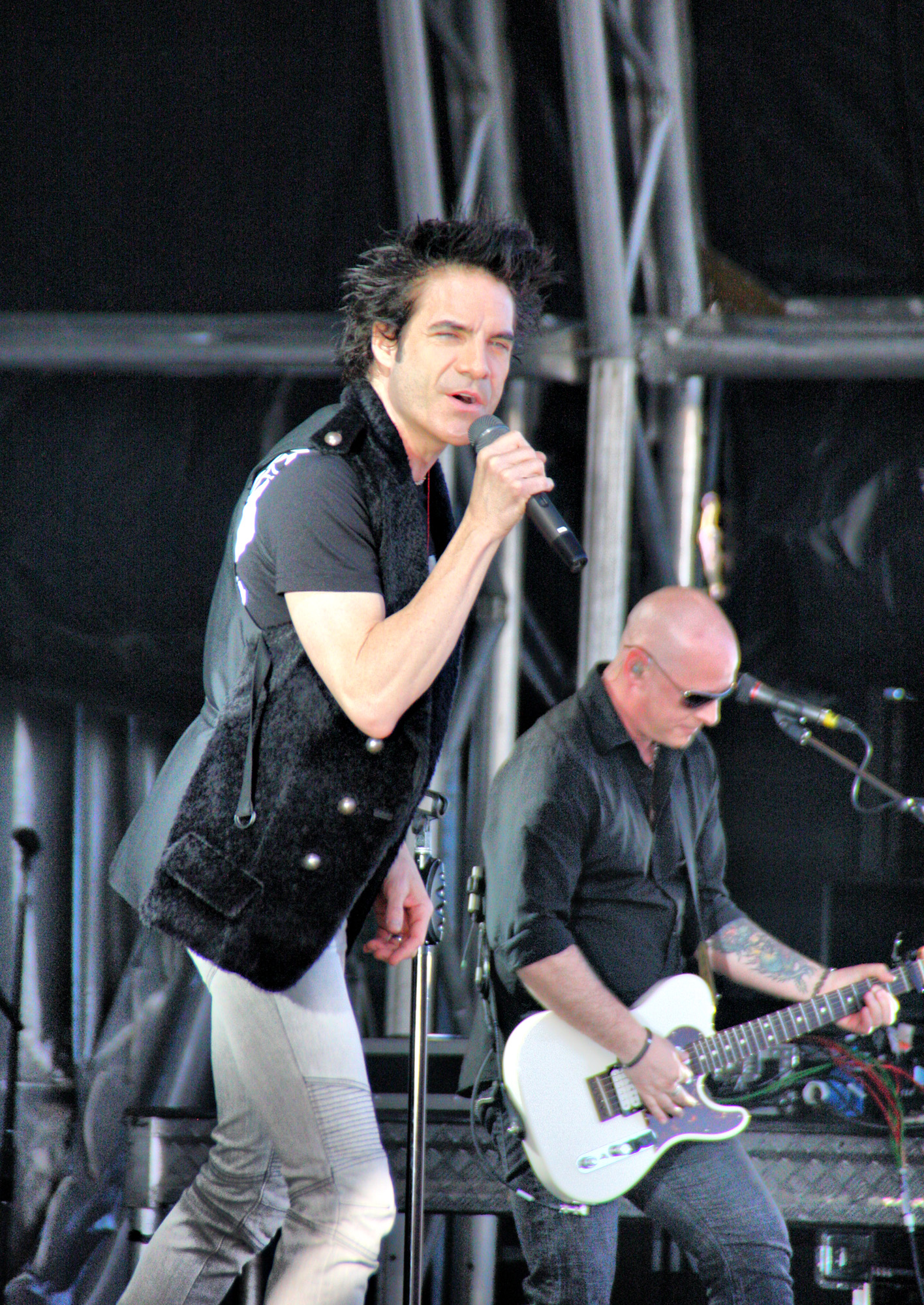
- Pat Monahan and Jimmy Stafford of Train performing in January 2011
- Studio albums: 10
- Extended plays: 4
- Live albums: 3
- Compilation albums: 1
- Singles: 34
- Video albums: 1
- Music videos: 29
- Promotional singles: 6

American pop rock band Train has released 10 studio albums, three live albums, one compilation album, one video album, four extended plays, 34 singles, six promotional singles and 29 music videos. The band independently released their eponymous debut studio album in December 1996, two years after their formation. In February 1998, the band signed to Aware Records and Columbia Records and re-released the album under the two labels. Three singles were released from Train; the album's first single, "Meet Virginia", peaked at number 20 on the US Billboard Hot 100. The album peaked at number 76 on the US Billboard 200 and was certified platinum by the Recording Industry Association of America (RIAA). In the period following the release of Train, producer Brendan O'Brien started working with the band in a partnership that would last for three albums. The band released their second studio album Drops of Jupiter in March 2001; it was preceded by the release of its lead single, "Drops of Jupiter (Tell Me)". The single became a commercial success, peaking at number five on the US Billboard Hot 100 and also becoming a top 10 hit in Australia, the Netherlands and the United Kingdom. "Drops of Jupiter (Tell Me)" also won an award for Best Rock Song at the 44th Grammy Awards. The album peaked at number six on the Billboard 200, earning a double platinum certification from the RIAA. "She's on Fire", the third single from Drops of Jupiter, achieved moderate success in Australia and the UK. Train's third studio album, My Private Nation, was released in June 2003. It peaked at number six on the Billboard 200 and was certified platinum by the RIAA. The album's first two singles, "Calling All Angels" and "When I Look to the Sky", peaked at numbers 19 and 74 respectively on the Billboard Hot 100. The band released their fourth studio album For Me, It's You in January 2006. The album peaked at number 10 on the Billboard 200 and spawned three singles.

Following a three-year hiatus, Train released the single "Hey, Soul Sister" in 2009. It became an international hit, peaking at number three on the Billboard Hot 100, topping the charts in Australia and the Netherlands and becoming a top 10 hit in multiple other countries. Save Me, San Francisco, the band's fifth studio album, was released in October 2009. For the album, the band worked with several producers, including Martin Terefe and Gregg Wattenberg. It peaked at number 17 on the Billboard 200, earning a gold certification from the RIAA. The album's second and third singles, "If It's Love" and "Marry Me", became top 40 hits on the Billboard Hot 100. In April 2012, Train released their sixth studio album California 37; it peaked at number four on the Billboard 200. The album's lead single "Drive By" peaked at number 10 on the Billboard Hot 100 and also became a top 10 hit in multiple other countries. Bulletproof Picasso followed in September 2014, peaking at number five on the Billboard 200, and was succeeded by the releases of the Christmas album Christmas in Tahoe in November 2015 and the Led Zeppelin tribute Train Does Led Zeppelin II in June 2016. A Girl, a Bottle, a Boat, the band's eighth studio album, was released in January 2017, peaking at number eight on the Billboard 200.

== Albums ==
=== Studio albums ===
List of studio albums, with selected chart positions, sales figures and certifications
| Title | Details | Peak chart positions | | | | | | | | | | Sales | Certifications |
| Title | Details | US | AUS | AUT | BEL (FL) | CAN | GER | NLD | NZ | SWI | UK | Sales | Certifications |
|---|---|---|---|---|---|---|---|---|---|---|---|---|---|
| Train | Released: December 6, 1996; Re-released: February 24, 1998; Label: Wolfgang, Aware, Columbia; Formats: CD, cassette | 76 | — | — | — | — | — | — | — | — | — | | RIAA: Platinum |
| Drops of Jupiter | Released: March 27, 2001; Label: Columbia; Formats: CD, cassette | 6 | 3 | 35 | 32 | 14 | 35 | 3 | 20 | 32 | 8 | | RIAA: 3× Platinum; ARIA: 4× Platinum; BPI: Gold; MC: 2× Platinum; NVPI: Gold |
| My Private Nation | Released: June 3, 2003; Label: Columbia; Formats: CD, cassette, digital download | 6 | 29 | — | — | — | — | — | 44 | 91 | 100 | | RIAA: Platinum |
| For Me, It's You | Released: January 31, 2006; Label: Columbia; Formats: CD, digital download | 10 | — | — | — | 66 | — | — | — | — | — | | |
| Save Me, San Francisco | Released: October 27, 2009; Label: Columbia; Formats: CD, LP, digital download | 17 | 8 | 27 | 75 | — | 43 | 13 | 21 | 34 | 33 | US: 954,000 | RIAA: 3× Platinum; ARIA: Platinum; BPI: Gold; MC: Gold; RMNZ: 2× Platinum |
| California 37 | Released: April 17, 2012; Label: Columbia; Formats: CD, LP, digital download | 4 | 9 | 22 | 103 | 6 | 25 | 16 | 17 | 14 | 7 | | RIAA: Platinum; ARIA: Gold; BPI: Platinum |
| Bulletproof Picasso | Released: September 16, 2014; Label: Columbia; Formats: CD, digital download | 5 | 15 | 44 | 141 | 7 | 46 | 18 | 32 | 15 | 9 | US: 145,000 | |
| A Girl, a Bottle, a Boat | Released: January 27, 2017; Label: Columbia; Formats: CD, LP, digital download | 8 | 5 | — | 180 | — | — | 61 | — | 54 | 13 | US: 53,000 | |
| AM Gold | Released: May 20, 2022; Label: Columbia; Formats: CD, LP, digital download | — | — | — | — | — | — | — | — | — | — | | |
| Mad Dog in the Fog | Released: August 28, 2026 (digital); November 13, 2026 (physical); Label: Columbia; Formats: CD, LP, digital download | — | — | — | — | — | — | — | — | — | — | | |
"—" denotes a recording that did not chart or was not released in that territory.

=== Tribute albums ===
List of tribute albums
| Title | Album details |
|---|---|
| Train Does Led Zeppelin II | Released: June 3, 2016; Label: Atlantic; Formats: CD, LP, digital download |

=== Christmas albums ===
List of christmas albums
| Title | Album details |
|---|---|
| Christmas in Tahoe | Released: November 13, 2015; Label: Sunken Forest; Formats: CD, digital download |

=== Live albums ===
List of live albums, with selected chart positions
| Title | Details | Peak chart positions | |
| Title | Details | US | US Rock |
|---|---|---|---|
| Alive at Last | Released: October 19, 2004; Label: Columbia; Formats: CD, digital download | 48 | — |
| iTunes Session | Released: September 10, 2010; Label: Columbia; Formats: Digital download | 84 | 29 |
| Live at Royal Albert Hall | Released: July 26, 2024; Label: Columbia; Formats: Digital download | — | — |
"—" denotes a recording that did not chart or was not released in that territory.

=== Compilation albums ===
List of compilation albums, with selected chart positions and certifications
| Title | Details | Peak chart positions | Certifications |
| Title | Details | US | Certifications |
|---|---|---|---|
| Greatest Hits | Released: November 9, 2018; Label: Columbia; Formats: CD, digital download | 105 | ARIA: Gold; BPI: Gold |

=== Video albums ===
List of video albums, with selected chart positions
| Title | Details | Peak chart positions |
| Title | Details | US Video |
|---|---|---|
| Midnight Moon | Released: December 18, 2001; Label: Sony Music Studios; Formats: VHS, DVD | 39 |

== Extended plays ==
List of extended plays
| Title | Details |
|---|---|
| Live from Fantasy Studios | Released: 1998; Formats: CD |
| One and a Half | Released: 1999; Label: Aware; Formats: CD |
| Live in Atlanta | Released: November 4, 2003; Label: Columbia; Formats: CD |
| Get to Me | Released: August 16, 2005; Formats: Digital download |

== Singles ==
List of singles, with selected chart positions and certifications, showing year released and album name
| Title | Year | Peak chart positions | | | | | | | | | | Certifications | Album |
| Title | Year | US | US Adult | AUS | AUT | CAN | GER | NLD | NZ | SWI | UK | Certifications | Album |
|---|---|---|---|---|---|---|---|---|---|---|---|---|---|
| "Meet Virginia" | 1998 | 20 | 2 | 91 | — | 15 | — | — | — | — | — | RIAA: 2× Platinum | Train |
| "Free" | 1998 | — | — | — | — | — | — | — | — | — | — | | Train |
| "I Am" | 1999 | — | 35 | — | — | — | — | — | — | — | — | | Train |
| "Drops of Jupiter (Tell Me)" | 2001 | 5 | 1 | 5 | 38 | — (Note: "Drops of Jupiter (Tell Me)" did not enter the Billboard Canadian Hot 100, but reached number one on the Canada CHR Nielsen BDS chart.) | 73 | 3 | 5 | 30 | 10 | RIAA: Diamond; ARIA: 13× Platinum; BPI: 3× Platinum; BVMI: Gold; RMNZ: 6× Platinum | Drops of Jupiter |
| "Something More" | 2001 | — (Note: "Something More" did not enter the Billboard Hot 100, but peaked at number 15 on the Bubbling Under Hot 100 Singles chart.) | 20 | 87 | — | — | — | — (Note: "Something More" did not enter the Dutch Top 40, but peaked at number seven on the Dutch Tipparade chart.) | — | — | — | | Drops of Jupiter |
| "She's on Fire" | 2002 | — | 21 | 57 | — | — | — | — | — | — | 49 | | Drops of Jupiter |
| "Calling All Angels" | 2003 | 19 | 1 | 22 | — | — | — | — | 32 | — | — | RIAA: 2× Platinum | My Private Nation |
| "When I Look to the Sky" | 2004 | 74 | 9 | — | — | — | — | — | 37 | — | — | RIAA: Gold | My Private Nation |
| "Ordinary" | 2004 | — | 12 | — | — | — | — | — | — | — | — | | Music from and Inspired by Spider-Man 2 |
| "Get to Me" | 2005 | — (Note: "Get to Me" did not enter the Billboard Hot 100, but peaked at number nine on the Bubbling Under Hot 100 Singles chart.) | 6 | — | — | — | — | — | — | — | — | | My Private Nation |
| "Cab" | 2005 | — (Note: "Cab" did not enter the Billboard Hot 100, but peaked at number four on the Bubbling Under Hot 100 Singles chart.) | 9 | — | — | — | — | — | — | — | — | | For Me, It's You |
| "Give Myself to You" | 2006 | — | 34 | — | — | — | — | — | — | — | — | | For Me, It's You |
| "Am I Reaching You Now" | 2006 | — | — | — | — | — | — | — | — | — | — | | For Me, It's You |
| "Hey, Soul Sister" | 2009 | 3 | 1 | 1 | 4 | 3 | 7 | 1 | 2 | 4 | 18 | RIAA: 13× Platinum; ARIA: 15× Platinum; BPI: 4× Platinum; BVMI: Platinum; IFPI SWI: Gold; MC: Diamond; RMNZ: 8× Platinum | Save Me, San Francisco |
| "If It's Love" | 2010 | 34 | 1 | 21 | — | 60 | — | — (Note: "If It's Love" did not enter the Dutch Top 40, but peaked at number two on the Dutch Tipparade chart.) | 28 | — | — | RIAA: Platinum; ARIA: Gold | Save Me, San Francisco |
| "Marry Me" | 2010 | 34 | 3 | — | — | 47 | — | — | — | — | — | RIAA: 4× Platinum; BPI: Silver; RMNZ: Gold | Save Me, San Francisco |
| "Shake Up Christmas" | 2010 | 99 | — | — | 14 | 97 | 24 | 6 | — | 25 | 134 | RIAA: Gold; BVMI: Gold | Save Me, San Francisco |
| "Save Me, San Francisco" | 2011 | 75 | 6 | 61 | — | — | — | — | — | — | — | RIAA: Gold | Save Me, San Francisco |
| "Drive By" | 2012 | 10 | 2 | 13 | 5 | 11 | 3 | 4 | 3 | 1 | 6 | RIAA: 6× Platinum; ARIA: 2× Platinum; BPI: 3× Platinum; BVMI: Platinum; IFPI AUT: Gold; IFPI SWI: Platinum; MC: 4× Platinum; NVPI: Platinum; RMNZ: 4× Platinum | California 37 |
| "50 Ways to Say Goodbye" | 2012 | 20 | 4 | 16 | — | 17 | — | 14 | — | — | 50 | RIAA: 3× Platinum; ARIA: Platinum; BPI: Silver; MC: Platinum; RMNZ: Platinum | California 37 |
| "Bruises" (featuring Ashley Monroe or Marilou) | 2012 | 79 | 11 | — | — | 59 | — | 30 | — | — | 169 | RIAA: Platinum; MC: Gold | California 37 |
| "This'll Be My Year" | 2012 | — | — | — | — | — | — | — | — | — | — | | California 37 |
| "Mermaid" | 2012 | — (Note: "Mermaid" did not enter the Billboard Hot 100, but peaked at number five on the Bubbling Under Hot 100 Singles chart.) | 12 | — | — | — | — | 19 | — | — | 93 | RIAA: Gold | California 37 |
| "Imagine" | 2013 | — | — | — | — | — | — | — | — | — | — | | California 37 |
| "Angel in Blue Jeans" | 2014 | 79 | 8 | — | 24 | 41 | 30 | 23 | — | 38 | 58 | RIAA: Gold | Bulletproof Picasso |
| "Cadillac, Cadillac" | 2014 | — | 21 | — | — | — | — | — | — | — | — | | Bulletproof Picasso |
| "Bulletproof Picasso" | 2015 | — | 22 | — | — | — | — | — | — | — | — | | Bulletproof Picasso |
| "Give It All" | 2015 | — | 35 | — | — | — | — | — | — | — | — | | Bulletproof Picasso |
| "Play That Song" | 2016 | 41 | 6 | 8 | 26 | 69 | — | — | — | — | 21 | RIAA: 3× Platinum; ARIA: 2× Platinum; BPI: Gold; MC: Platinum; RMNZ: Gold | A Girl, a Bottle, a Boat |
| "Drink Up" | 2017 | — | 19 | — | — | — | — | — | — | — | — | | A Girl, a Bottle, a Boat |
| "Lottery" | 2017 | — | — | — | — | — | — | — | — | — | — | | A Girl, a Bottle, a Boat |
| "Call Me Sir" (featuring Cam and Travie McCoy) | 2018 | — | 23 | — | — | — | — | — | — | — | — | | Greatest Hits |
| "Mai Tais" (featuring Skylar Grey) | 2019 | — | — | — | — | — | — | — | — | — | — | | Non-album singles |
| "Rescue Dog" | 2020 | — | — | — | — | — | — | — | — | — | — | | Non-album singles |
| "Mittens" | 2021 | — | — | — | — | — | — | — | — | — | — | | Non-album singles |
| "AM Gold" | 2022 | — | 16 | — | — | — | — | — | — | — | — | | AM Gold |
| "Cleopatra" (featuring Sofia Reyes) | 2022 | — | — | — | — | — | — | — | — | — | — | | AM Gold |
| "I Know" (featuring Tenille Townes and Bryce Vine) | 2023 | — | 19 | — | — | — | — | — | — | — | — | | Non-album singles |
| "Serious" (with Niiko & Swae) | 2024 | — | — | — | — | — | — | — | — | — | — | | Non-album singles |
| "Long Yellow Dress" | 2024 | — | 31 | — | — | — | — | — | — | — | — | | Non-album singles |
| "Bloom" (with Cheat Codes) | 2024 | — | — | — | — | — | — | — | — | — | — | | Future Renaissance |
| "Brokenhearted" (with Gabry Ponte) | 2025 | — | — | — | — | — | — | — | — | — | — | | Non-album singles |
| "The Weekend" | 2026 | — | — | — | — | — | — | — | — | — | — | | Mad Dog in the Fog |
| "Pennsylvania Turnpike" | 2026 | — | — | — | — | — | — | — | — | — | — | | Mad Dog in the Fog |
| "Mad Dog in the Fog" | 2026 | — | — | — | — | — | — | — | — | — | — | | Mad Dog in the Fog |
"—" denotes a recording that did not chart or was not released in that territory.

=== Promotional singles ===
List of promotional singles, with selected chart positions, showing year released and album name
| Title | Year | Peak chart positions | | | Album |
| Title | Year | US Bub. | US Pop Dig. | US Rock Dig. | Album |
|---|---|---|---|---|---|
| "Ramble On" | 2001 | — | — | — | Train Does Led Zeppelin II |
| "The Finish Line" | 2010 | 19 | — | 18 | Save Me, San Francisco |
| "Feels Good at First" | 2012 | — | — | 24 | California 37 |
| "Wonder What You're Doing for the Rest of Your Life" (featuring Marsha Ambrosius) | 2014 | — | 43 | — | Bulletproof Picasso |
| "Working Girl" | 2016 | — | — | — | A Girl, a Bottle, a Boat |
| "The News" | 2017 | — | — | — | A Girl, a Bottle, a Boat |
| "Running Back (Trying to Talk to You)" | 2022 | — | — | — | AM Gold |
| "Turn Up the Radio" (featuring Jewel) | 2022 | — | — | — | AM Gold |

== Other charted songs ==
List of songs, with selected chart positions, showing year released and album name
| Title | Year | Peak chart positions | | Album |
| Title | Year | US AC | CAN AC | Album |
|---|---|---|---|---|
| "Joy to the World" | 2012 | 5 | — | A Very Special Christmas: 25 Years Bringing Joy to the World |
| "This Christmas" | 2015 | 1 | — | Christmas in Tahoe |
| "Have Yourself a Merry Little Christmas" | 2015 | 5 | 29 | Christmas in Tahoe |
| "Merry Christmas Everybody" | 2015 | 10 | 46 | Christmas in Tahoe |
| "What Christmas Means to Me" | 2015 | — | 6 | Christmas in Tahoe |
| "Happy Xmas (War Is Over)" | 2015 | — | 26 | Christmas in Tahoe |
| "Philly Forget Me Not" (with Daryl Hall & John Oates) | 2018 | 12 | — | —N/a |
"—" denotes a recording that did not chart or was not released in that territory.

== Other appearances ==
List of guest appearances, showing year released and album name
| Title | Year | Album |
|---|---|---|
| "Light My Fire" | 2000 | Stoned Immaculate: The Music of the Doors |
| "Fall Out" | 2002 | We Were Soldiers soundtrack |
| "What Child Is This?" | 2004 | Sweet Tracks 2004 |
| "Baby Roulette" (with Chiddy Bang) | 2011 | Peanut Butter and Swelly |
| "To Be Loved" | 2011 | Abduction soundtrack |
| "Should We Believe" | 2011 | Hawaii Five-0: Original Songs from the Television Series |
| "Joy to the World" | 2012 | A Very Special Christmas: 25 Years Bringing Joy to the World |

== Music videos ==
List of music videos, showing year released and directors
| Title | Year | Director(s) |
|---|---|---|
| "Meet Virginia" | 1999 | Luke Scott |
| "Drops of Jupiter (Tell Me)" (version 1) | 2001 | —N/a |
| "Drops of Jupiter (Tell Me)" (version 2) | 2001 | Nigel Dick |
| "She's on Fire" | 2001 | Marc Smerling |
| "Something More" | 2002 | Marc Smerling |
| "Drops of Jupiter (Tell Me)" (live from the Warfield) | 2002 | Marc Smerling |
| "Calling All Angels" | 2003 | Shaun Peterson |
| "When I Look to the Sky" | 2003 | Thomas Kloss |
| "I'm About to Come Alive" | 2003 | —N/a |
| "Ordinary" | 2004 | Antti Jokinen |
| "Cab" | 2005 | Antti Jokinen |
| "Give Myself to You" | 2006 | Philip Andelman |
| "Hey, Soul Sister" | 2009 | Matthew Stawski |
| "If It's Love" | 2010 | Pete Wentz, Bill Fishman |
| "Shake Up Christmas" | 2010 | Lex Halaby |
| "Marry Me" | 2010 | Lex Halaby |
| "Save Me, San Francisco" | 2011 | Bill Fishman |
| "Drive By" | 2012 | Alan Ferguson |
| "50 Ways to Say Goodbye" | 2012 | Marc Klasfeld |
| "Bruises" (featuring Ashley Monroe) | 2012 | Alan Ferguson |
| "This'll Be My Year" (live from Red Rocks) | 2012 | —N/a |
| "Mermaid" | 2013 | Alan Ferguson |
| "Angel in Blue Jeans" | 2014 | Brendan Walter, Mel Soria |
| "Cadillac Cadillac" | 2014 | Matthew Stawski |
| "Bulletproof Picasso" | 2015 | Brendan Walter, Mel Soria |
| "Give It All" | 2015 | Bayan Joonam |
| "Play That Song" | 2016 | Travis Kopach |
| "Drink Up" | 2017 | SCANTRON & No. 2 Pencil |
| "Call Me Sir" | 2018 | Erik Rojas |
| "Careless Whisper" | 2018 | Brendan Walter |
| "Rescue Dog" | 2020 | |
| "Cleopatra" | 2022 | Mamo Veldez |
