= List of Train members =

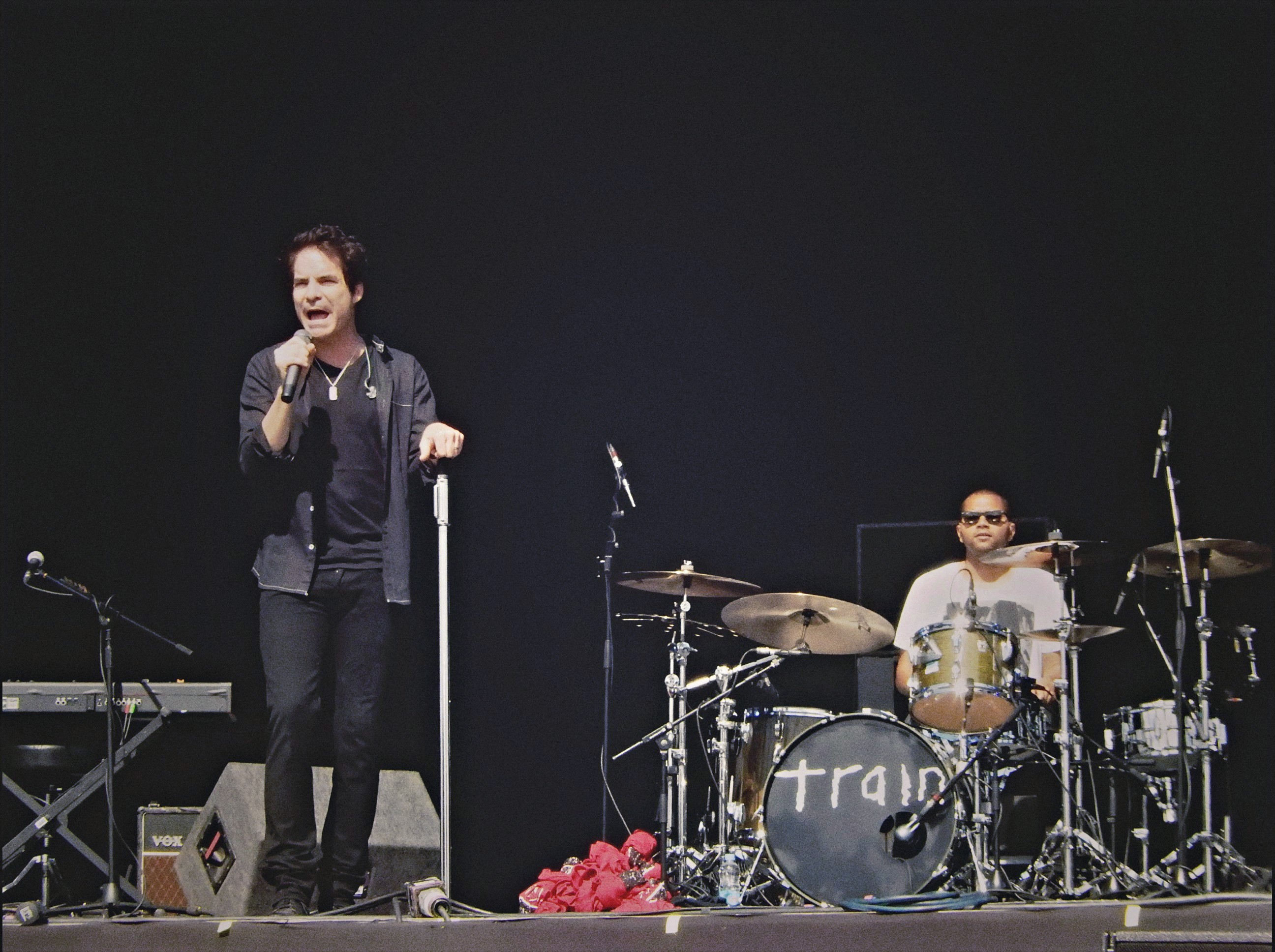
Train performing in 2014

Train is a San Francisco pop rock band that formed in July 1994. The band originally consisted of lead vocalist/drummer Patrick Monahan and guitarist/bassist Rob Hotchkiss. Later, former Apostles members Jimmy Stafford and Charlie Colin playing guitar and bass, joined Train. At a later date, Scott Underwood joined Train, playing drums and keyboards.

The original lineup of five released two studio albums, their eponymous album, Train, which reached platinum, and their double-platinum album, Drops of Jupiter. As the band was recording their third album, later to go platinum, My Private Nation, Rob Hotchkiss left in late 2002, to pursue a solo career, after recording six tracks that would later be on the album. Soon after, bassist Charlie Colin, left Train in October 2003.

For a short time, Train was a trio in 2003. They recruited bassist Johnny Colt, former member of The Black Crowes, and keyboardist Brandon Bush, late in the same year. For touring, the band also recruited guitar player Tony Lopacinski. Lopacinski never took part in recording an album with the band. The remaining five members released the band's fourth studio album on January 31, 2006, titled For Me, It's You. After the tour for the album, Tony Lopacinski left the band.

The band decided to go on hiatus in November 2006. In May 2009, during the recording of their fifth studio album, Johnny Colt and Brandon Bush decided to depart from Train and the band became a trio once again. On October 27, 2009, the trio released their fifth studio album, entitled Save Me, San Francisco, their first new album in nearly four years. Since May 2009, Hector Maldonado (bass/vocals/guitar/percussion) and Jerry Becker (keyboards/guitar) have been part of the touring and recording group. On April 13, 2012, the band released their sixth studio album, California 37. That same year, Sakai Smith and Nikita Houston started touring with the band as backing singers, and also Drew Shoals joined the band as a new drummer, Underwood switched to keyboards and Becker took over guitar duties.

In June 2014, Scott Underwood left the band, and Becker returned to keyboards. After Underwood's departure, the band went on to release their seventh studio album on September 12, 2014, titled Bulletproof Picasso. Their eighth studio album, a special Christmas album titled Christmas in Tahoe was released on November 13, 2015. A few months later on June 3, 2016, the band released their ninth studio album, a cover album of Led Zeppelin songs titled Train Does Led Zeppelin II.

In October 2016, shortly after the release of their ninth studio album, Jimmy Stafford announced that he would be becoming only a part-time member of the band; not long after, he announced his permanent departure. His absence left Pat Monahan as the only original member left in the band, although he stated that Stafford was always welcome if he wanted to rejoin. Stafford's departure led to Luis Maldonado joining the band as a full-time guitarist. On January 27, 2017, the band released their tenth studio album titled A Girl, a Bottle, a Boat. Drummer Drew Shoals left the band in 2019 and was replaced by Matt Musty; in 2021, guitarist Luis Maldonado also left the band, and was replaced by Taylor Locke. In September 2023, Sakai Smith and Nikita Houston left the band after the summer 2023 tour. Beginning in June 2025, Butch Walker replaced Taylor Locke.

== Members ==
=== Current members ===
Image	Name	Years active	Instruments	Release contributions
	Pat Monahan	1994–present	lead vocals; trumpet; saxophone; vibraphone; percussion; drums	all Train releases
	Hector Maldonado	2008–present	bass; vocals; guitar; percussion	all releases from Save Me, San Francisco (Golden Gate Edition) (2009) onwards
	Jerry Becker	2008–present	keyboards; rhythm guitar; backing vocals	all releases from Save Me, San Francisco (Golden Gate Edition) (2009) onwards
	Matt Musty	2019–present	drums; percussion	AM Gold (2022)
	Butch Walker	2025–present (2010–2015; 2019–2025 session musician)	lead guitar; backing vocals; production	all releases from Save Me, San Francisco (Golden Gate Edition) (2009) to Christmas in Tahoe (2015); all releases from AM Gold (2022) onwards

=== Former members ===
Image	Name	Years active	Instruments	Release contributions
	Rob Hotchkiss	1994–2002	rhythm and lead guitar; backing vocals; bass	Train (1998); Drops of Jupiter (2001); My Private Nation (2003)
	Mike Spears	1994–1995	lead guitar	none
	Jimmy Stafford	1994–2016	lead guitar; mandolin; ukulele; backing vocals	all releases from Train (1998) to Bulletproof Picasso (2014)
	Scott Underwood	1994–2014	drums; keyboards; percussion	all releases from Train (1998) to California 37 (2012)
	Charlie Colin	1994–2003 (died 2024)	bass; backing vocals; rhythm guitar	Train (1998); Drops of Jupiter (2001); My Private Nation (2003)
	Kevin Costello	1998–2003 (touring member)	keyboards; bass	none
	Johnny Colt	2003–2009	bass	For Me, It's You (2006)
	Brandon Bush	2003–2009	keyboards; backing vocals	For Me, It's You (2006)
	Tony Lopacinski	2004–2005 (touring member)	guitar	none
	Sakai Smith	2012–2023	backing vocals	all releases from Save Me, San Francisco (2009) to AM Gold (2022)
	Nikita Houston	2012–2023	backing vocals	none
	Drew Shoals	2014–2018	drums; percussion	all releases from Bulletproof Picasso (2014) to A Girl, a Bottle, a Boat (2017)
	Luis Maldonado	2016–2021	lead guitar; backing vocals	Christmas in Tahoe (2015); Train Does Led Zeppelin II (2016); A Girl, a Bottle, a Boat (2017)
	Taylor Locke	2021–2025	lead guitar; backing vocals	AM Gold (2022)

== Line-ups ==
Period	Members	Studio releases
July–August 1994	Patrick Monahan – lead vocals, drums, percussion; Rob Hotchkiss – guitar, bass, backing vocals	—
August 1994 – early 1995	Patrick Monahan – lead vocals, drums, percussion; Rob Hotchkiss – rhythm guitar, bass, backing vocals; Mike Spears – lead guitar	—
Early 1995 – October 2003	Patrick Monahan – lead vocals, trumpet, saxophone, vibraphone, percussion, drums; Rob Hotchkiss – rhythm guitar, backing vocals, bass; Jimmy Stafford – lead guitar, mandolin, ukulele, backing vocals; Charlie Colin – bass, backing vocals, rhythm guitar; Scott Underwood – drums, keyboards, percussion	Train, February 24, 1998; Drops of Jupiter, March 27, 2001; My Private Nation, June 3, 2003
October 2003 – November 2006	Patrick Monahan – lead vocals, trumpet, saxophone, vibraphone, percussion; Jimmy Stafford – guitar, mandolin, ukulele, backing vocals; Scott Underwood – drums, percussion; Johnny Colt – bass; Brandon Bush – keyboards, backing vocals	For Me, It's You, January 31, 2006
May 2009 – June 2014	Patrick Monahan – lead vocals, trumpet, saxophone, vibraphone, percussion, drums; Jimmy Stafford – lead guitar, mandolin, ukulele, backing vocals; Scott Underwood – drums, keyboards, percussion; Hector Maldonado – bass, backing vocals, percussion; Jerry Becker – keyboards, rhythm guitar	Save Me San Francisco, October 27, 2009; California 37, April 13, 2012
June 2014	Patrick Monahan – lead vocals, trumpet, saxophone, vibraphone, percussion; Jimmy Stafford – lead guitar, mandolin, ukulele, backing vocals; Scott Underwood – keyboards; Hector Maldonado – bass, backing vocals, percussion; Jerry Becker – rhythm guitar; Sakai Smith – backing vocals; Nikita Houston – backing vocals; Drew Shoals – drums, percussion	—
June 2014 – June 2016	Patrick Monahan – lead vocals, trumpet, saxophone, vibraphone, percussion; Jimmy Stafford – lead guitar, mandolin, ukulele, backing vocals; Hector Maldonado – bass, backing vocals, percussion; Jerry Becker – keyboards, rhythm guitar; Sakai Smith – backing vocals; Nikita Houston – backing vocals; Drew Shoals – drums, percussion	Bulletproof Picasso, September 12, 2014; Christmas in Tahoe, November 13, 2015
June–August 2016	Patrick Monahan – lead vocals, trumpet, saxophone, vibraphone, percussion; Jimmy Stafford – lead guitar, mandolin, ukulele, backing vocals (semi retired); Hector Maldonado – bass, backing vocals, percussion; Jerry Becker – keyboards, rhythm guitar; Sakai Smith – backing vocals; Nikita Houston – backing vocals; Drew Shoals – drums, percussion; Luis Maldonaldo – lead guitar, backing vocals	Train Does Led Zeppelin II, June 3, 2016
August 2016 – December 2018	Patrick Monahan – lead vocals, trumpet, saxophone, vibraphone, percussion; Hector Maldonado – bass, backing vocals, percussion; Jerry Becker – keyboards, rhythm guitar; Sakai Smith – backing vocals; Nikita Houston – backing vocals; Drew Shoals – drums, percussion; Luis Maldonaldo – lead guitar, backing vocals	A Girl, a Bottle, a Boat, January 27, 2017
December 2018 – June 2019	Patrick Monahan – lead vocals, trumpet, saxophone, vibraphone, percussion, drums; Hector Maldonado – bass, backing vocals, percussion; Jerry Becker – keyboards, rhythm guitar; Sakai Smith – backing vocals; Nikita Houston – backing vocals; Luis Maldonaldo – lead guitar, backing vocals	—
June 2019 – May 2021	Patrick Monahan – lead vocals, trumpet, saxophone, vibraphone, percussion; Hector Maldonado – bass, backing vocals, percussion; Jerry Becker – keyboards, rhythm guitar; Sakai Smith – backing vocals; Nikita Houston – backing vocals; Luis Maldonaldo – lead guitar, backing vocals; Matt Musty – drums, percussion	—
May–August 2021	Patrick Monahan – lead vocals, trumpet, saxophone, vibraphone, percussion; Hector Maldonado – bass, backing vocals, percussion; Jerry Becker – keyboards, guitar; Sakai Smith – backing vocals; Nikita Houston – backing vocals; Matt Musty – drums, percussion	—
August 2021 – September 2023	Patrick Monahan – lead vocals, trumpet, saxophone, vibraphone, percussion; Hector Maldonado – bass, backing vocals, percussion; Jerry Becker – keyboards, rhythm guitar; Sakai Smith – backing vocals; Nikita Houston – backing vocals; Matt Musty – drums, percussion; Taylor Locke – lead guitar, backing vocals	AM Gold, May 20, 2022
September 2023 – May 2025	Patrick Monahan – lead vocals, trumpet, saxophone, vibraphone, percussion; Hector Maldonado – bass, backing vocals, percussion; Jerry Becker – keyboards, rhythm guitar; Matt Musty – drums, percussion; Taylor Locke – lead guitar, backing vocals	—
May 2025 – present	Patrick Monahan – lead vocals, trumpet, saxophone, vibraphone, percussion; Hector Maldonado – bass, backing vocals, percussion; Jerry Becker – keyboards, rhythm guitar; Matt Musty – drums, percussion; Butch Walker – lead guitar, backing vocals	—
