= Greatest Hits (Train album) =

Compilation album by Train
- Released: November 9, 2018
- Recorded: 1998–2018
- Studio: Various
- Genres: Rock, pop rock, roots rock
- Length: 66:23
- Label: Columbia

Train chronology
A Girl, a Bottle, a Boat (2017)	Greatest Hits (2018)	AM Gold (2022)

Singles from Greatest Hits
- 1. "Call Me Sir" Released: May 24, 2018

Greatest Hits is the first compilation album by the American rock band Train, released on November 9, 2018, through Columbia Records. It includes a cover of George Michael's "Careless Whisper" featuring saxophonist Kenny G, as well as the single "Call Me Sir" and tracks from all their studio albums.

== Background ==
Frontman Pat Monahan stated that he avoided putting out a greatest hits album because he "always thought of those records as a way of saying, 'Welp, it was fun while it lasted' and that stressed me out." Monahan said he later came around to the idea of compiling the band's hits as "We live in a new music world now and having people be able to find songs they love faster and easier seems like a great idea."

== Track listing ==
No.	Title	Length
1.	"Meet Virginia" (from Train, 1998)	3:59
2.	"Drops of Jupiter" (from Drops of Jupiter, 2001)	4:19
3.	"Calling All Angels" (from My Private Nation, 2003)	4:02
4.	"Get to Me" (from My Private Nation)	4:05
5.	"When I Look to the Sky" (from My Private Nation)	4:04
6.	"Cab" (from For Me, It's You, 2006)	3:22
7.	"Hey, Soul Sister" (from Save Me, San Francisco, 2009)	3:36
8.	"If It's Love" (from Save Me, San Francisco)	3:59
9.	"Marry Me" (from Save Me, San Francisco)	3:25
10.	"Save Me, San Francisco" (from Save Me, San Francisco)	4:09
11.	"Drive By" (from California 37, 2012)	3:16
12.	"50 Ways to Say Goodbye" (from California 37)	4:08
13.	"Bruises" (featuring Ashley Monroe; From California 37)	3:51
14.	"Angel in Blue Jeans" (from Bulletproof Picasso, 2014)	3:26
15.	"Play That Song" (from A Girl, a Bottle, a Boat, 2017)	4:03
16.	"Call Me Sir" (featuring Cam and Travie McCoy; previously unreleased)	3:35
17.	"Careless Whisper" (featuring Kenny G; George Michael cover)	5:07
Total length:		66:23

== Charts ==
Chart (2018)	Peak position
Scottish Albums (Official Charts)	90
US Billboard 200	105

== Certifications ==
Region	Certification	Certified units/sales
Australia (ARIA)	Gold	35,000^{‡}
United Kingdom (BPI)	Gold	100,000^{‡}
^{‡} Sales+streaming figures based on certification alone.
