= Ain't No Easy Way =

Ain't No Easy Way may refer to:

- "Ain't No Easy Way", a song by Black Rebel Motorcycle Club from Howl (2005)
- "Ain't No Easy Way", a song by Train from AM Gold (2022)
