= Get to Me (disambiguation) =

"Get to Me" is a 2005 song by Train.

Get to Me may also refer to:

- Get to Me (Unspoken EP)
- Get to Me (Train EP)
- "Get To Me", a 1978 song by Luther Ingram
- "Get to Me", a song by Lady Antebellum from Golden
