= The Side Deal =

American band

The SIDE DEAL
- Origin: Newport Beach, California, U.S.
- Genres: Rock; Country Music; Alternative Rock
- Years active: 2017–present
- Members: Stan Frazier; Joel Owen; Scott Owen
- Past members: Charlie Colin

The Side Deal is an American band from Newport Beach, California. The band was formed in 2017 by Grammy winning artist Charlie Colin of Train, Stan Frazier of Sugar Ray and brothers Joel and Scott Owen of The PawnShop kings. Side Deal performed live with other notable artists such as Jeff “Skunk” Baxter of The Doobie Brothers, Steely Dan and Alice Cooper.

== Singles ==
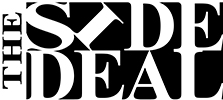
Logo

Year	Title
2019	"The One That Got Away"(with Jim Cregan)
2020	"Ghosts"
