= Brand New Immortals =

- Origin: Atlanta, Georgia, United States
- Genres: Southern rock; hard rock; blues rock; funk; pop
- Years active: 2000–2002
- Label: Elektra Records
- Past members: David Ryan Harris; Johnny Colt; Kenny Cresswell

Brand New Immortals was an American rock trio formed by singer David Ryan Harris, drummer Kenny Cresswell, and former bassist Johnny Colt. The group released a successful 6 track EP and were signed to Elektra Records. In 2001, the trio produced a full length album entitled Tragic Show, which the band felt that Elektra did not properly promote. Early the next year the band broke up.

== Discography ==
- Piston, Protein, Afro-Sheen (2000)
- Tragic Show (2001)

== Singles ==
- 2001 Reasons Why
