= Calling All Angels (Train song) =

2003 single by Train

Single by Train

from the album My Private Nation
- B-side: "For You"; "Fascinated"; "Landmine"
- Released: April 14, 2003
- Length: 4:01; 3:51 (radio edit)
- Label: Columbia
- Songwriters: Charlie Colin; Pat Monahan; Jimmy Stafford; Scott Underwood
- Producer: Brendan O'Brien

Train singles chronology
"She's on Fire" (2002)	"Calling All Angels" (2003)	"When I Look to the Sky" (2004)

Audio sample
- file; help

Music video
- "Calling All Angels" on YouTube

"Calling All Angels" is a song by American rock band Train. It was included on the band's third studio album, My Private Nation, and produced by Brendan O'Brien. On April 14, 2003, the song was the first single to be released from My Private Nation, peaking at number 19 on the US Billboard Hot 100 and topping three other Billboard charts: the Adult Contemporary, Adult Top 40, and Triple-A listings. Outside the US, the song entered the top 40 in Australia and New Zealand.

== Background ==
"Calling All Angels" was inspired by a conversation singer Pat Monahan had with his therapist. Monahan said, "She said, "Just remember that we are made up of angels and traitors, and the angel is the one that says, 'You're beautiful and you can do anything you want,' and the traitor is the one that says, 'You're ugly and you can't get anything right.'" And so that song just came from that conversation of, if we all called our angels, what a cool life this would be for all of us."

== Critical reception ==
The song received mixed reviews from rock critics, with Ken Tucker of Entertainment Weekly giving the song a B+ and calling it "an anthemic hymn to commitment...that builds steadily to a gloriously clanging climax." Matt Lee of the BBC was less impressed, describing the track as "pedestrian, the vocals soulless, even more so than" the band's biggest hit single, "Drops of Jupiter (Tell Me)".

== Awards and nominations ==
The recording was nominated for two Grammy Awards at the ceremony held in February 2004. In the category Best Rock Performance by a Duo or Group, it lost out to "Disorder in the House" by Bruce Springsteen and Warren Zevon. In the category Best Rock Song, the winner was "Seven Nation Army" by The White Stripes.

== Track listings ==
European CD single

1. "Calling All Angels" (radio edit) – 3:51
2. "For You" – 3:04

European maxi-CD single

1. "Calling All Angels" (radio edit) – 3:51
2. "Fascinated" – 3:26
3. "Landmine" – 3:49
4. "Calling All Angels" (video)

Australian CD single

1. "Calling All Angels" (radio edit) – 3:51
2. "Fascinated" – 3:26
3. "For You" – 3:04
4. "Landmine" – 3:49

== Charts ==
=== Weekly charts ===
Chart (2003–2004)	Peak position
Australia (ARIA)	22
New Zealand (Recorded Music NZ)	32
US Billboard Hot 100	19
US Adult Alternative Airplay (Billboard)	1
US Adult Contemporary (Billboard)	1
US Adult Pop Airplay (Billboard)	1
US Mainstream Rock (Billboard)	40
US Pop Airplay (Billboard)	24

=== Year-end charts ===
Chart (2003)	Position
US Billboard Hot 100	45
US Adult Contemporary (Billboard)	23
US Adult Top 40 (Billboard)	3
US Mainstream Top 40 (Billboard)	79
US Triple-A (Billboard)	2

Chart (2004)	Position
US Adult Contemporary (Billboard)	9

== Certifications ==
Region	Certification	Certified units/sales
United States (RIAA)	2× Platinum	2,000,000^{‡}
^{‡} Sales+streaming figures based on certification alone.

== Release history ==
Region	Date	Format(s)	Label(s)	Ref.
United States	April 14, 2003	Hot adult contemporary; triple A radio	Columbia	
Australia	May 26, 2003	CD	Columbia	
United States	June 9, 2003	Adult contemporary radio	Columbia	
United Kingdom	July 14, 2003	CD	Columbia	

== Cover versions ==
In 2016, the song was used in the US version of The Passion. It was sung by Jencarlos and appeared on the official soundtrack album. It was sung in the story when Jesus (Jencarlos) prays in the Garden of Gethsemane. The tempo was slowed, several lyrics were changed, and the third verse was entirely cut to fit the theme of the scene.

== In popular culture ==
Since the song's release in 2003, the Los Angeles Angels have played the song accompanied by a montage detailing the team's history and accomplishments at every home game at Angel Stadium of Anaheim. In 2010, the band performed the song before the season's Home Run Derby which took place in Anaheim.

== See also ==
- List of Billboard Adult Contemporary number ones of 2004
