= Call Me Sir =

Single by Train featuring Cam & Travie McCoy

from the album Greatest Hits
- Released: May 24, 2018
- Genre: Pop; pop rock
- Length: 3:35
- Label: Columbia
- Songwriter(s): William Wiik Larsen: Travie McCoy; Pat Monahan

Train singles chronology
"Philly Forget Me Not" (2018)	"Call Me Sir" (2018)	"Mai Tais" (2019)

Cam singles chronology
"Diane" (2017)	"Call Me Sir" (2018)	"So Long" (2019)

Travie McCoy singles chronology
"Golden" (2015)	"Call Me Sir" (2018)	"A Spoonful Of Cinnamon" (2021)

Music video
- "Call Me Sir" on YouTube

"Call Me Sir" is a song by American rock band Train featuring American country music singer Cam and American rapper Travie McCoy, the lead vocalist of Gym Class Heroes. It was released on May 24, 2018. The single included from first compilation album Greatest Hits.

== Background ==
Call Me Sir is a song about the social advantages that come with dating someone. Pat Monahan, the lead singer of Train, confirmed on Facebook that the song's lyrics tell a true story.

== Music video ==
Train released the video for single "Call Me Sir" on August 21, 2018. The video follows a young boy who feels like an outsider until he meets a girl who helps him find his confidence. Front man Patrick Monahan says: "The 'Call Me Sir' video was a blast to make. It's about a little girl helping a little boy feel like maybe he'll be ok in this life."

He also stated that "being around Cam and Travie is always great and the kids that played the younger versions of us were super cute and great at their parts ... Might have been the easiest, funniest video shoot in the past 20 years."

== Charts ==
=== Weekly charts ===
Chart (2018)	Peak position
Belgium (Ultratip Bubbling Under Wallonia)	4
US Adult Contemporary (Billboard)	13
US Adult Pop Airplay (Billboard)	23

=== Year-end charts ===
Chart (2018)	Position
US Adult Contemporary (Billboard)	32
