= For Me, It's You =

Studio album by Train
- Released: January 31, 2006
- Recorded: Summer 2005
- Genres: Rock; roots rock; pop rock
- Length: 48:22
- Label: Columbia
- Producer: Brendan O'Brien

Train chronology
| My Private Nation (2003) | For Me, It's You (2006) | Save Me, San Francisco (2009) |

Singles from For Me, It's You
- 1. "Cab" Released: November 15, 2005; 2. "Give Myself to You" Released: 2006; 3. "Am I Reaching You Now" Released: 2006

Professional ratings
Aggregate scores
| Source | Rating |
|---|---|
| Metacritic | 61/100 |
Review scores
| Source | Rating |
| AllMusic | 3.5/5 stars |
| E! Online | B |
| Rolling Stone | 3/5 stars |
| Slant Magazine | 1.5/5 stars |

For Me, It's You is the fourth studio album by American band Train, released through Columbia Records on January 31, 2006. It was Train's last album to be recorded as a five-piece until 2014's Bulletproof Picasso and is their only album to feature keyboardist Brandon Bush and bassist Johnny Colt. The album's first single, "Cab", was released to radio in November 2005. The second and third singles, "Give Myself to You" and "Am I Reaching You Now" were released in mid-2006.

The album was met with commercial disappointment. Despite debuting at number 10 on the US Billboard 200, it descended the chart quickly and is their first album not to have received an RIAA certification. It was also the band's only album to not feature a Billboard Hot 100-charting single until AM Gold in 2022.

The album was dedicated to Greg Violett, who died on May 2, 2005.

== Track listing ==
All songs credited to Train, except "If I Can't Change Your Mind", written by Bob Mould. Actual songwriters adapted from Tidal and the Songview Database.

For Me, It's You track listing
| No. | Title | Writer(s) | Length |
|---|---|---|---|
| 1. | "All I Ever Wanted" | Pat Monahan, Jimmy Stafford, Brandon Bush, Johnny Colt, Scott Underwood | 4:05 |
| 2. | "Get Out" | Monahan, Stafford, Bush, Colt, Underwood | 3:24 |
| 3. | "Cab" | Monahan, Bush | 3:23 |
| 4. | "Give Myself to You" | Monahan, Bush | 3:22 |
| 5. | "Am I Reaching You Now" | Monahan, Bush, Colt, Brendan O'Brien, Audley Freed | 3:44 |
| 6. | "If I Can't Change Your Mind" | Bob Mould | 3:07 |
| 7. | "All I Hear" | Monahan, Bush | 3:29 |
| 8. | "Shelter Me" | Monahan, Colt | 3:35 |
| 9. | "Explanation" | Monahan, Colt | 4:30 |
| 10. | "Always Remember" | Monahan, O'Brien | 3:33 |
| 11. | "I'm Not Waiting in Line" | Monahan, Bush | 3:41 |
| 12. | "Skyscraper" | Monahan, Stafford, Bush, Colt, Underwood | 3:54 |
| 13. | "For Me, It's You" | Monahan, Bush, Colt, Freed | 4:28 |

=== Bonus tracks ===
For Me, It's You iTunes pre-order bonus track
| No. | Title | Writer(s) | Length |
|---|---|---|---|
| 14. | "I Wanna Believe" | Monahan, Bush, Colt, Freed | 3:27 |
| Total length: | | | 51:49 |

US Target, Australian and European edition bonus track
| No. | Title | Writer(s) | Length |
|---|---|---|---|
| 14. | "Coming Home" | Monahan, Bush | 3:23 |
| Total length: | | | 51:45 |

== Personnel ==
All credits for For Me, It's You adapted from the album's liner notes and Tidal.

=== Train ===
- Patrick Monahan – vocals
- Jimmy Stafford – guitar
- Scott Underwood – drums, percussion
- Brandon Bush – keyboards
- Johnny Colt – bass guitar

=== Additional musicians ===
- Brendan O'Brien – production, mixing, instrumentation
- Eddie Horst – string arrangements (1, 3, 10, 13)

=== Additional personnel ===
- Nick DiDia – recording engineer
- Tom Tapley – assistant recording engineer
- Billy Bowers – additional engineering
- Bob Ludwig – mastering
- Jon Landau – mangagement
- Barbara Carr – management
- Jan Stabile – management
- Sue Berger – management
- Alison Oscar – management
- Tammy Comstock – management
- Josh Cheuse – art direction and design
- Danny Clinch – photography
- KC Haxton – artwork

== Charts ==
Chart performance for For Me, It's You
| Chart (2006) | Peak position |
|---|---|
| US Billboard 200 | 10 |
| US Top Rock Albums (Billboard) | 2 |
