= Cab (song) =

Single by Train

from the album For Me, It's You
- Released: November 15, 2005
- Genre: Rock, pop rock
- Length: 3:23
- Label: Columbia Records
- Songwriter: Train
- Producer: Brendan O'Brien

Train singles chronology
"Get to Me" (2005)	"Cab" (2005)	"Give Myself to You" (2006)

Audio sample
- file; help

Music video
- "Cab" on YouTube

"Cab" is a song written and recorded by the American rock band, Train. It was released in November 2005 as the lead single from the band's fourth studio album, For Me, It's You, and was produced by Brendan O'Brien. It peaked higher on the charts than the two other radio singles from the album, "Give Myself to You" and "Am I Reaching You Now".

== Background ==
According to Train's lead singer and frontman Pat Monahan, "Cab" and "All I Ever Wanted" were the first two songs written for the album. inspired by the emotions he felt following his divorce to ex-wife Ginean Rapp in 2004:

When I was writing the lyrics to 'Cab' it was the winter and I was staying at this place in Pennsylvania, looking out the window and just being really lonely. It was lonely as I had ever been during the day. And so I just pictured being the only cab in Manhattan.

Monahan has likened "Cab" to being "the metaphoric song on the album". adding:

Everything else seems to the point and literal. This whole album is about where I've been lyrically for the last couple of years, experiencing what I've had to experience. You don't choose your experiences, they choose you.

In an interview with VH1's Aaron Cummins, then-bass guitarist Johnny Colt of the Black Crowes reflected on the recording process of the track:

When I heard the very first demo of "Cab," I knew that it was a great song – and an important song. Brandon can lay out the whole band in both his hands, which is a great instrument for a super-versatile and distinct vocalist like Pat to sing over. You can't ask for anything better to work with from a songwriting standpoint than a singer who has the capabilities of Pat – his personality aside, of course.

== Reviews ==
The song received mostly mixed reviews by critics. AllMusic gave it a positive review, saying that the piano part is "worthy of one of Billy Joel's finest songs", and that it used "painterly synth, strummed acoustic guitars, and a killer string arrangement". It also said that it was "a fine song, but it's not the best one" on the album. Rolling Stone mentions it among the highlights of the album, saying it is "a wintry and moving vehicular metaphor".

== Music video ==
The music video for "Cab" was filmed in New York City, New York. It features the lead singer, Patrick Monahan, in several locations in the city. The video has more than 1,700,000 views on YouTube and was uploaded October 25, 2009.

== Track listing ==
1. "Cab" - 3:22

== Charts ==
=== Weekly charts ===
Chart (2005–06)	Peak position
US Bubbling Under Hot 100 Singles (Billboard)	4
US Adult Top 40 (Billboard)	9
US Adult Contemporary (Billboard)	19
US Triple A (Billboard)	2

=== Year-end charts ===
Chart (2006)	Position
US Adult Top 40 (Billboard)	31
