= Train Does Led Zeppelin II =

Studio album by Train
- Released: June 3, 2016
- Studios: Bear Creek (Woodinville); Sunken Forest (Issaquah)
- Genres: Rock; hard rock; blues rock
- Length: 41:51
- Label: Crush Music/Atlantic
- Producers: Ryan Hadlock; Train

Train chronology
Christmas in Tahoe (2015)	Train Does Led Zeppelin II (2016)	A Girl, a Bottle, a Boat (2017)

Train Does Led Zeppelin II is the ninth studio album by American rock band Train. This album covers Led Zeppelin's album Led Zeppelin II in its entirety. The album was performed in concert and was released digitally as well as on compact disc and vinyl. All profits from sales of the album went to the San Francisco–based charity, Family House.

== Track listing ==
Train Does Led Zeppelin II track listing
No.	Title	Writer(s)	Length
1.	"Whole Lotta Love"	John Bonham, Willie Dixon, John Paul Jones, Jimmy Page, Robert Plant	5:31
2.	"What Is and What Should Never Be"	Page, Plant	4:50
3.	"The Lemon Song"	Bonham, Chester Burnett, Jones, Page, Plant	6:24
4.	"Thank You"	Page, Plant	5:00
5.	"Heartbreaker"	Bonham, Jones, Plant, Page	4:15
6.	"Living Loving Maid (She's Just a Woman)"	Page, Plant	2:41
7.	"Ramble On"	Page, Plant	4:22
8.	"Moby Dick"	Bonham, Jones, Page	4:23
9.	"Bring It On Home"	Dixon	4:25
Total length:			41:51

== Personnel ==
Train

- Pat Monahan – vocals, production
- Luis Maldonado – lead electric guitar, 12-string electric guitar, acoustic guitar, slide guitar, production
- Jerry Becker – rhythm electric guitar, 12-string electric guitar, acoustic guitar, Hammond B3, harmonica, production, vocal production, additional engineering
- Hector Maldonado – bass, production
- Drew Shoals – drums, percussion, production

Technical

- Ryan Hadlock – production, engineering
- Brian Lucey – mastering
- David Bianco – mixing
- Taylor Carroll – engineering
- Brighton Pruss – engineering assistance
- Tye Hastings – engineering assistance

== Charts ==
Chart (2016)	Peak position
US Billboard 200	71
