= Christmas in Tahoe =

Studio album by Train
- Released: November 13, 2015
- Recorded: Bear Creek Studio, Sunken Forest Studio (May & June 2015)
- Genre: Christmas
- Length: 52:06; 59:58 (deluxe); 77:41 (10th anniversary deluxe)
- Label: Sunken Forest
- Producer: John Goodmanson

Train chronology
| Bulletproof Picasso (2014) | Christmas in Tahoe (2015) | Train Does Led Zeppelin II (2016) |

Christmas in Tahoe is the eighth studio album and first Christmas album by American rock band Train, released on November 13, 2015, by Sunken Forest Records. The album was made digitally available exclusively on Amazon at the time of its release, as well as being released on CD to most retailers. The album features renditions of twelve traditional Christmas songs and three originals written by the band.

The album was released by other digital retailers on October 27, 2017, and a deluxe edition was made available on CD. The non-deluxe stock release contains a lyric sheet that mirrors the first 12 songs but not the last three. The tracks that are on this CD are the first 12 listed on the deluxe edition.

On November 28, 2021, the Hallmark Channel aired a movie, Christmas in Tahoe, based on the album. Lead singer Pat Monahan co-starred and was executive producer on the film.

A 10th Anniversary Deluxe Edition of the album was released on November 21, 2025. This edition featured three new original songs. It also included the original version of "Shake Up Christmas" as the opening track and the song "Mittens" from the Hallmark film.

== Track listing ==
| No. | Title | Writer(s) | Length |
|---|---|---|---|
| 1. | "This Christmas" | Donny Hathaway, Nadine McKinnor | 3:25 |
| 2. | "Christmas Must Be Tonight" | Robbie Robertson | 3:20 |
| 3. | "River" | Joni Mitchell | 3:40 |
| 4. | "Christmas Island" | Pat Monahan, Jerry Becker | 3:55 |
| 5. | "Have Yourself a Merry Little Christmas" | Hugh Martin, Ralph Blane | 4:28 |
| 6. | "Merry Christmas Everybody" | Noddy Holder, Jim Lea | 3:14 |
| 7. | "Santa, Bring My Baby Back (To Me)" | Aaron Schroeder, Claude Demetrius | 2:36 |
| 8. | "What Christmas Means to Me" | Allen Story, Anna Gordy Gaye, George Gordy | 2:53 |
| 9. | "Wait for Mary, Christmas" | Monahan, Becker | 3:35 |
| 10. | "O Holy Night" | Adolphe Adam | 3:18 |
| 11. | "Shake Up Christmas" | Monahan, Butch Walker | 4:07 |
| 12. | "Happy Xmas (War Is Over)" | John Lennon, Yoko Ono | 3:33 |
| 13. | "2000 Miles" | Chrissie Hynde | 3:49 |
| 14. | "Tinsel and Lights" | Tracey Thorn | 3:13 |
| 15. | "Mele Kalikimaka" | Robert Alexander Anderson | 3:00 |
| Total length: | | | 52:06 |

Christmas in Tahoe (Deluxe Edition)
| No. | Title | Writer(s) | Length |
|---|---|---|---|
| 1. | "This Christmas" | Donny Hathaway, Nadine McKinnor | 3:25 |
| 2. | "Christmas Must Be Tonight" | Robbie Robertson | 3:20 |
| 3. | "River" | Joni Mitchell | 3:40 |
| 4. | "Christmas Island" | Pat Monahan, Jerry Becker | 3:55 |
| 5. | "Have Yourself a Merry Little Christmas" | Hugh Martin, Ralph Blane | 4:28 |
| 6. | "Merry Christmas Everybody" | Noddy Holder, Jim Lea | 3:14 |
| 7. | "What Christmas Means to Me" | Allen Story, Anna Gordy Gaye, George Gordy | 2:53 |
| 8. | "Wait for Mary, Christmas" | Monahan, Becker | 3:35 |
| 9. | "O Holy Night" | Adolphe Adam | 3:18 |
| 10. | "Shake Up Christmas" | Monahan, Butch Walker | 4:07 |
| 11. | "2000 Miles" | Chrissie Hynde | 3:49 |
| 12. | "Tinsel and Lights" | Tracey Thorn | 3:14 |
| 13. | "Merry Christmas Baby" | Lou Baxter, Johnny Moore | 3:21 |
| 14. | "The Cherry Tree Carol" | Joan Baez | 3:47 |
| 15. | "Please Come Home for Christmas" | Charles Brown, Gene Redd | 3:52 |
| 16. | "Run Run Rudolph" | Johnny Marks, Marvin Brodie | 2:57 |
| 17. | "Blue Christmas" | Billy Hayes, Jay W. Johnson | 2:58 |
| Total length: | | | 59:58 |

Christmas in Tahoe (10th Anniversary Deluxe Edition)
| No. | Title | Writer(s) | Length |
|---|---|---|---|
| 1. | "Shake Up Christmas" | Pat Monahan, Butch Walker | 3:52 |
| 2. | "This Christmas" | Donny Hathaway, Nadine McKinnor | 3:25 |
| 3. | "Christmas Must Be Tonight" | Robbie Robertson | 3:20 |
| 4. | "River" | Joni Mitchell | 3:40 |
| 5. | "Christmas Island" | Monahan, Jerry Becker | 3:55 |
| 6. | "Have Yourself a Merry Little Christmas" | Hugh Martin, Ralph Blane | 4:28 |
| 7. | "Merry Christmas Everybody" | Noddy Holder, Jim Lea | 3:14 |
| 8. | "What Christmas Means to Me" | Allen Story, Anna Gordy Gaye, George Gordy | 2:53 |
| 9. | "Wait for Mary, Christmas" | Monahan, Becker | 3:35 |
| 10. | "O Holy Night" | Adolphe Adam | 3:18 |
| 11. | "2000 Miles" | Chrissie Hynde | 3:49 |
| 12. | "Tinsel and Lights" | Tracey Thorn | 3:14 |
| 13. | "Merry Christmas Baby" | Lou Baxter, Johnny Moore | 3:21 |
| 14. | "The Cherry Tree Carol" | Joan Baez | 3:47 |
| 15. | "Please Come Home for Christmas" | Charles Brown, Gene Redd | 3:52 |
| 16. | "Run Run Rudolph" | Johnny Marks, Marvin Brodie | 2:57 |
| 17. | "Blue Christmas" | Billy Hayes, Jay W. Johnson | 2:58 |
| 18. | "Shake Up Christmas (Tahoe Version)" | Monahan, Walker | 4:07 |
| 19. | "Mittens" | Monahan, Becker, Matt Musty, Jonny Coffer | 3:21 |
| 20. | "Under the Christmas Moonlight" | Monahan, Becker, Musty, Walker | 3:46 |
| 21. | "Rainy New York Christmas" | Monahan, Becker, Musty | 3:45 |
| 22. | "Let's Stay In Tonight" | Monahan, Becker, Musty | 2:59 |
| Total length: | | | 77:41 |

== Personnel ==
Credits adapted from AllMusic

Train

- Pat Monahan – vocals, arrangement
- Jerry Becker – keyboards
- Hector Maldonado – bass, percussion, and background vocals
- Luis Carlos Maldonado – guitar and background vocals
- Drew Shoals – drums
- Nikita Houston – background vocals
- Sakai Smith – background vocals

Other musicians

- Mike Davis – French horn, trombone
- Jeff Kievit – French horn, trumpet
- Lisa Kim – concertmaster, strings
- David Mann – horn, alto saxophone
- Rob Mathes – horn, strings
- Suzanne Ornstein – leader, strings, violin
- Victoria Parker – violin
- Phillip A. Peterson – cello, strings
- Robert Rinehart – leader, strings, viola
- Roger Rosenberg – French horn, baritone saxophone
- Andy Snitzer – French horn, tenor saxophone
- Alan Stepansky – cello, leader, strings
- Aidan James – ukulele

Technical

- John Goodmanson – production
- Alex Venguer – engineer
- Michael Brauer – mixing
- Casey Catelli – photography
- Joe LaPorta – mastering
- Rob Mathes – conductor, string arrangements
- Mikey Ortiz – package design
- Sandra Park – contractor
- Phillip A. Peterson – arrangement
- Steve Vealey – mixing assistant

== Charts ==
| Chart (2015) | Peak position |
|---|---|
| US Billboard 200 | 151 |
| US Independent Albums (Billboard) | 9 |
| US Top Holiday Albums (Billboard) | 10 |

== Release history ==
| Region | Date | Format(s) | Label |
|---|---|---|---|
| United States | November 13, 2015 | CD; digital download | Sunken Forest |
