= Johnny Colt =

American bass guitar player

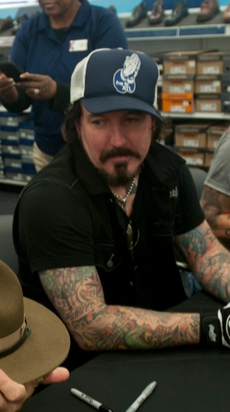
- Colt with Lynyrd Skynyrd in 2012

Background information
- Born: Charles Brandt; May 1, 1966 (age 60); Atlanta, Georgia, U.S.
- Genres: Southern rock; pop rock; hard rock
- Occupation: Musician
- Instrument: Bass
- Years active: 1989–present

Johnny Colt (born Charles Brandt; May 1, 1966) is an American bass guitar player who formerly played with rock bands Lynyrd Skynyrd, The Black Crowes and Train.

== Music career ==
From 1989 he was the original bassist for The Black Crowes which formed in Atlanta, Georgia. Colt played on four full-length albums with the band and toured extensively. After leaving the Black Crowes in 1997 he went on to form the Brand New Immortals with guitarist David Ryan Harris and drummer Kenny Cresswell. Colt played bass for the American modern rock band Train from 2003 to 2006. In addition he joined Tommy Lee, becoming the permanent replacement for Jason Newsted (formerly of Metallica) in the band Rock Star Supernova. Colt has made numerous DJ performances with Tommy Lee, Rob Wonder and DJ MB3.

In 2012, he joined Lynyrd Skynyrd as their new bassist before departing from the band in 2017.

== Business ventures ==
Colt is co-owner of the Atlanta-based backline company Avatar Events Group with Kenny Cresswell which opened in 1995. Avatar Events Group is a music equipment rental, production, storage, and rehearsal space company which also hosts numerous local and international based bands and musicians.

Along with Train tour manager Thomas O'Keefe, he opened NoDa Studios in Charlotte, North Carolina in the fall of 2007. NoDa Studios is a band rehearsal studio located in the NoDa (neighborhood) of Charlotte.

== In media ==
Colt co-hosts the AM radio talk show 'Politely Disruptive' on WMLB AM1690 (the Voice of the Arts) with Michael Ouwleen (producer on Space Ghost Coast to Coast among others). The show airs on Tuesdays and Thursdays in the metro Atlanta area. 'Politely Disruptive' also is broadcast via internet stream at www.1690wmlb.com .

On September 7, 2009, Colt premiered as the host of the Travel Channel's reality show At Full Volume. In 2008 Colt was a part of Tommy Lee's team on the TV reality show Battle Ground Earth which also starred rapper Ludacris and aired on TLC.
