= Train (album) =

Studio album by Train
- Released: December 6, 1996
- Genres: Rock; alternative country
- Length: 56:38
- Labels: Aware; Columbia
- Producers: Train; Curtis Mathewson

Train studio album chronology
Train (1996)	Drops of Jupiter (2001)

Singles from Train
- 1. "Meet Virginia" Released: March 1998; 2. "Free" Released: July 1998; 3. "I Am" Released: October 19, 1999

Professional ratings
Review scores
Source	Rating
AllMusic	3/5 stars

Train is the debut album from the American rock band Train, released independently on December 6, 1996 and publicly through Columbia Records on February 24, 1998. The album was self-produced for $25,000 and three singles from the album were released. The first single released, "Meet Virginia", peaked at No. 20 on the Billboard Hot 100. The second, "Free", was largely a hit on rock stations, and the third single from the album was "I Am". The album has been certified platinum by the RIAA.

"Free" saw significant airplay on mainstream rock radio, later being featured on the TV show Party of Five.

== Track listing ==
All songs are credited to Train. Actual songwriters adapted from Tidal.

No.	Title	Writer(s)	Length
1.	"Meet Virginia"	Pat Monahan, Jimmy Stafford, Rob Hotchkiss	4:00
2.	"I Am"	Monahan, Hotchkiss	4:29
3.	"If You Leave"	Monahan, Stafford, Hotchkiss, Charlie Colin, Scott Underwood	3:29
4.	"Homesick"	Monahan, Hotchkiss	4:39
5.	"Free"	Monahan, Hotchkiss	3:58
6.	"Blind"	Monahan, Stafford, Colin	5:01
7.	"Eggplant"	Monahan, Hotchkiss	3:11
8.	"Idaho"	Monahan, Stafford	4:57
9.	"Days"	Monahan, Stafford, Colin	4:39
10.	"Rat"	Monahan, Hotchkiss	4:32
11.	"Swaying" (actual length is 3:11, followed by a minute of silence)	Monahan, Hotchkiss	4:13
12.	"Train" (hidden track)	Monahan, Hotchkiss	5:34
13.	"Heavy" (hidden track)	Monahan, Stafford, Colin	3:49

=== Original track listing ===
The album was originally released independently on December 6, 1996, and featured a different track listing. Songwriting credits adapted from Tidal and the Songview Database.

No.	Title	Writer(s)	Length
1.	"I Am"	Pat Monahan, Rob Hotchkiss
2.	"Free"	Monahan, Hotchkiss
3.	"Homesick"	Monahan, Hotchkiss
4.	"Blind"	Monahan, Jimmy Stafford, Charlie Colin
5.	"Eggplant"	Monahan, Hotchkiss
6.	"Meet Virginia"	Monahan, Stafford, Hotchkiss
7.	"Train"	Monahan, Hotchkiss
8.	"Rat"	Monahan, Hotchkiss
9.	"Swaying"	Monahan, Hotchkiss
10.	"Days"	Monahan, Stafford, Colin
11.	"Idaho"	Monahan, Stafford
12.	"Sorry For"	Monahan, Stafford, Hotchkiss, Colin, Scott Underwood
13.	"The Highway" (hidden track)	Monahan, Stafford, Hotchkiss, Colin, Underwood

== Personnel ==
Train

- Pat Monahan – lead vocals, percussion
- Jimmy Stafford – lead guitar, mandolin, backing vocals
- Rob Hotchkiss – rhythm guitar, harmonica, backing vocals
- Charlie Colin – bass
- Scott Underwood – drums, percussion

Additional personnel

- Grandma E. Bishop – art design
- David Bryson – mixing
- Gary Cirimelli – mixing assistant
- Tommy Dougherty III – art direction
- Charlie Gillingham – piano, organ, mellotron
- Bob Ludwig – mastering
- Mike McHugh – engineer
- Curtis Mathewson – moog synthesizer, producer, melodica
- Nick DiDia – engineer
- Charles Quagliana – engineer
- Stephen Saper – authoring
- Richard Stutting – artwork, design, illustrations
- Train – producer
- Matt Wallace – producer, engineer, mixing on "If You Leave"
- Alan Yoshida – mastering

== Charts ==
Chart performance for Train
Chart (1999)	Peak position
US Billboard 200	76

"Free"
Chart (1999)	Peak position
US Mainstream Rock (Billboard)	12

"I Am"
Chart (2000)	Peak position
US Adult Pop Airplay (Billboard)	35

== Certifications ==
Certifications for Train
Region	Certification	Certified units/sales
United States (RIAA)	Platinum	1,000,000^{^}
^{^} Shipments figures based on certification alone.

== Release history ==
"I Am"
Region	Date	Format(s)	Label(s)	Ref.
United States	October 19, 1999	Mainstream rock; active rock radio	Columbia; Aware	
United States	March 28, 2000	Contemporary hit radio	Columbia; Aware	
United States	April 4, 2000	Adult contemporary; hot adult contemporary radio	Columbia; Aware	
