= My Private Nation =

Studio album by Train
- Released: June 3, 2003
- Studios: Southern Tracks Recording, Atlanta, Georgia
- Genres: Rock; roots rock; pop rock; alternative rock
- Length: 43:07
- Label: Columbia
- Producer: Brendan O'Brien

Train chronology
Drops of Jupiter (2001)	My Private Nation (2003)	For Me, It's You (2006)

Singles from My Private Nation
- 1. "Calling All Angels" Released: April 14, 2003; 2. "When I Look to the Sky" Released: 2004; 3. "Get to Me" Released: 2005

My Private Nation is the third studio album by American pop rock band Train. It was released June 3, 2003. The album was reissued February 8, 2005, as a CD+DVD dual disc set. The album is certified Platinum in the US. It is Train's last album to feature bassist Charlie Colin and rhythm guitarist Rob Hotchkiss, who both left in 2003.

== Singles ==
Three singles were released from this album. The lead single, "Calling All Angels", was a top 20 hit on the Billboard Hot 100, peaking at #19, and was a huge success on the Adult Contemporary and Adult Top 40 charts. The single featured the songs "Fascinated", "For You", and "Landmine" as its b-sides, all of which featured songwriting from "Rob Hotchkins". The album's second single "When I Look to the Sky" also hit the Top 100 and was successful in Adult Top 40 and the Adult Contemporary chart as well. The third single, "Get to Me", was also a successful song on the Adult Top 40 chart, and the album as a whole has been certified platinum by the RIAA.

"I'm About to Come Alive" was covered in 2008 by country music artist David Nail, who released it as a single from his debut album of the same name.

== Reception ==
Professional ratings
Review scores
Source	Rating
Allmusic	4.5/5 stars
Blender	2/5 stars
Entertainment Weekly	B+
Chicago Sun-Times	3/4 stars
The Hartford Courant	(mixed)
Los Angeles Times	2.5/4 stars
Newsday	(B)
Q	3/5 stars
Rolling Stone	1/5 stars
The Washington Post	(favorable)

My Private Nation received mixed reviews from most music critics. At Metacritic, which assigns a normalized rating out of 100 to reviews from mainstream critics, the album received an average score of 61, based on 6 reviews, which indicates "generally favorable reviews". Allmusic editor Thom Jurek praised the band's existential lyrics and producer Brendan O'Brien's contribution to the album, stating "O'Brien's gorgeous multi-layered production [...] chromatic shadings and the textures of contemporary psychedelia are rooted in the heart of an ambitious garage band [...] he gets the sound of how big Train actually is in a context that is as aurally beautiful musically as it is emotionally and lyrically poignant". Entertainment Weekly's Ken Tucker dubbed it Train's "finest effort yet", complimenting the band's "amusingly self-deprecating lyrics" and the songs' "surface attractiveness". Sean Daly of The Washington Post noted layers of "featherweight joy" and "Hallmark-deep, guitar-driven pop", and noted lead singer Pat Monahan's performance, "[he] throws his body into every lyric and sounds like a showoff cross between Live's Ed Kowalczyk and Journey's Steve Perry". E! Online commented that the band "sound[s] like a better Counting Crows (with a dreamier frontman) and less-challenging Wallflowers". Despite writing that "Pat Monahan's vocals can be a bit grating and Train's material sometimes strays into Black Crowes Lite range", Chicago Sun-Times writer Jeff Wisser called the album "a greatsounding collection of slight but irresistible little poprock confections", noting "a sure sense of songcraft and a well-honed pop sensibility" in the songwriting.

Q gave the album three out of five stars and stated "[Train] continues to adhere firmly to the rootsy rock of fellow travellers Matchbox Twenty and Counting Crows, while their earnest musicianship and hard work will delight fans of that sort of thing". Jeff Puma of The Hartford Courant commended Train for their "sincere attempt at a positive message", but wrote "The effect, unfortunately, is schmaltz, and Train comes off as a poor man's Counting Crows". Rolling Stone writer Gavin Edwards called the band "radio-ready, professional and utterly dull", commenting that "The up-tempo songs are worse than the ballads, and the attempts at lyrical sass are even worse than the sentimental cliches". Glenn Gamboa of Newsday found the band's "sorta rock" style "painfully predictable" on most songs, but stated "The last three songs - the Oasis-ish 'Your [Every] Color', the '80s power-ballad throwback 'Lincoln Avenue' and the gorgeous 'I'm About to Come Alive' - finally fulfill the promise hinted at in the previous seven songs and most of the previous two albums, for that matter". Despite calling them "still essentially Matchbox Twenty Jr.", Los Angeles Times writer Steve Hochman commented that the band "expands its menu beyond vanilla, with some playfulness in words and music, and producer Brendan O'Brien helping bring some imagination to the arrangements".

== Track listing ==
U.S. Edition

No.	Title	Writer(s)	Length
1.	"Calling All Angels"	Patrick Monahan, Jimmy Stafford, Charlie Colin, Scott Underwood	4:01
2.	"All American Girl"	Monahan, Brendan O'Brien	3:17
3.	"When I Look to the Sky"	Monahan, Stafford, Colin, Underwood	4:04
4.	"Save the Day"	Monahan, O'Brien	4:05
5.	"My Private Nation"	Monahan, O'Brien	3:22
6.	"Get to Me"	Monahan, Rob Hotchkiss, Stafford, Colin, Underwood	4:05
7.	"Counting Airplanes"	Monahan, Hotchkiss, Stafford, Colin, Underwood	4:21
8.	"Following Rita"	Monahan, Hotchkiss, Stafford, Colin, Underwood	3:44
9.	"Your Every Color"	Monahan, Hotchkiss, Stafford, Colin, Underwood	4:26
10.	"Lincoln Avenue"	Monahan, Hotchkiss, Stafford, Colin, Underwood	3:36
11.	"I'm About to Come Alive"	Monahan, Hotchkiss, Stafford, Colin, Underwood, Clint Bennett	4:05

=== Bonus tracks ===
USA edition
No.	Title	Writer(s)	Length
12.	"When I Look to the Sky" (Radio Edit)	Monahan, Stafford, Colin, Underwood	4:00
Total length:			47:07

European edition
No.	Title	Writer(s)	Length
12.	"Better Off Alive"	Monahan, Hotchkiss, Stafford, Colin, Underwood	3:15
Total length:			46:22

Japanese edition
No.	Title	Writer(s)	Length
12.	"Out Here in the Open"	Monahan, Hotchkiss, Stafford, Colin, Underwood	3:44
Total length:			46:51

DVD

- Entire album in 5.1 Surround Sound and enhanced LPCM Stereo
- Documentary film 21 Days With Train
- "I'm About To Come Alive" music video
- "My Private Nation" live version music video
- Exclusive footage of a rare instore performance
- Karaoke surprise appearance footage
- Band member profiles
- Discography

== Personnel ==
- Patrick Monahan – lead vocals, percussion
- Jimmy Stafford – lead guitar, background vocals, mandolin
- Scott Underwood – drums, keyboards, piano, programming, percussion
- Charlie Colin – bass, rhythm guitar, background vocals
- Rob Hotchkiss – rhythm guitar, bass, piano, background vocals (6–11)

=== Additional personnel ===
- Brendan O'Brien – keyboards, piano, organ, guitars, marxophone, percussion, backing vocals
- Soozie Tyrell – violin on "Lincoln Avenue"
- Jane Scarpantoni – cello on "Lincoln Avenue"
- Greg Leisz – pedal steel guitar on "Calling All Angels"

== Charts ==
=== Weekly charts ===
Chart (2003)	Peak position
Australian Albums (ARIA)	29
Italian Albums (FIMI)	64
New Zealand Albums (RMNZ)	44
Scottish Albums (Official Charts)	79
Swiss Albums (Schweizer Hitparade)	91
UK Albums (Official Charts)	100
US Billboard 200	6

=== Year-end charts ===
Chart (2003)	Position
US Billboard 200	119

=== Single ===
Year	Single	Chart	Position
2003	"Calling All Angels"	Billboard Hot Adult Top 40 Tracks	1
2003	"Calling All Angels"	Billboard Hot Adult Contemporary Tracks	1
2003	"Calling All Angels"	Billboard Hot 100	19
2003	"When I Look to the Sky"	Billboard Hot Adult Top 40 Tracks	9
2004	"When I Look to the Sky"	Billboard Hot Adult Contemporary Tracks	24
2004	"When I Look to the Sky"	Billboard Hot 100	74
2005	"Get to Me"	Billboard Hot Adult Top 40 Tracks	6

== Certifications ==
Region	Certification	Certified units/sales
United States (RIAA)	Platinum	1,000,000^{^}
^{^} Shipments figures based on certification alone.
