= When I Look to the Sky =

2003 single by Train

Single by Train

from the album My Private Nation
- Released: August 25, 2003
- Length: 4:04
- Label: Columbia
- Songwriters: Charlie Colin; Patrick Monahan; Jimmy Stafford; Scott Underwood
- Producer: Brendan O'Brien

Train singles chronology
"Calling All Angels" (2003)	"When I Look to the Sky" (2003)	"Ordinary" (2004)

Music video
- "When I Look to the Sky" on YouTube

"When I Look to the Sky" is a song by American rock band Train, released as the second single from their third studio album, My Private Nation (2003), on August 25, 2003. The song reached number nine on the US Billboard Adult Top 40 chart and number 74 on the Billboard Hot 100. It also charted in New Zealand, peaking at number 37 on the RIANZ Singles Chart.

== Music video ==
The music video portrays a relationship between the lead singer, Pat Monahan and his lover, Kiana Bessa.

== Charts ==
=== Weekly charts ===
Chart (2003–2004)	Peak position
New Zealand (Recorded Music NZ)	37
US Billboard Hot 100	74
US Adult Alternative Airplay (Billboard)	12
US Adult Contemporary (Billboard)	24
US Adult Pop Airplay (Billboard)	9

=== Year-end charts ===
Chart (2003)	Position
US Adult Top 40 (Billboard)	91

Chart (2004)	Position
US Adult Top 40 (Billboard)	19

== Certifications ==
Region	Certification	Certified units/sales
United States (RIAA)	Gold	500,000^{‡}
^{‡} Sales+streaming figures based on certification alone.

== Release history ==
Region	Date	Format(s)	Label(s)	Ref.
United States	August 25, 2003	Triple-A radio	Columbia	
United States	October 13, 2003	Hot adult contemporary radio	Columbia	
