= Get to Me =

Single by Train

from the album My Private Nation
- Released: 2005
- Recorded: 2003
- Genre: Pop rock; alternative rock
- Length: 4:07 (album version); 3:43 (single version)
- Label: Columbia
- Songwriters: Charlie Colin; Rob Hotchkiss; Patrick Monahan; Jimmy Stafford; Scott Underwood

Train singles chronology
"Ordinary" (2004)	"Get to Me" (2005)	"Cab" (2005)

Audio video
- "Get to Me" on YouTube

"Get to Me" is a song by the American rock band Train, for their third album, My Private Nation. It was released in 2005 as the third and final single for the album. It was featured in a Cingular commercial. It is also directly inspired by Oleta Adams' "Get Here" with lyrics almost parodying hers.

== Charts ==
Chart (2005)	Peak position
US Adult Pop Airplay (Billboard)	6
US Bubbling Under Hot 100 (Billboard)	9
