= Train (band) =

American rock band

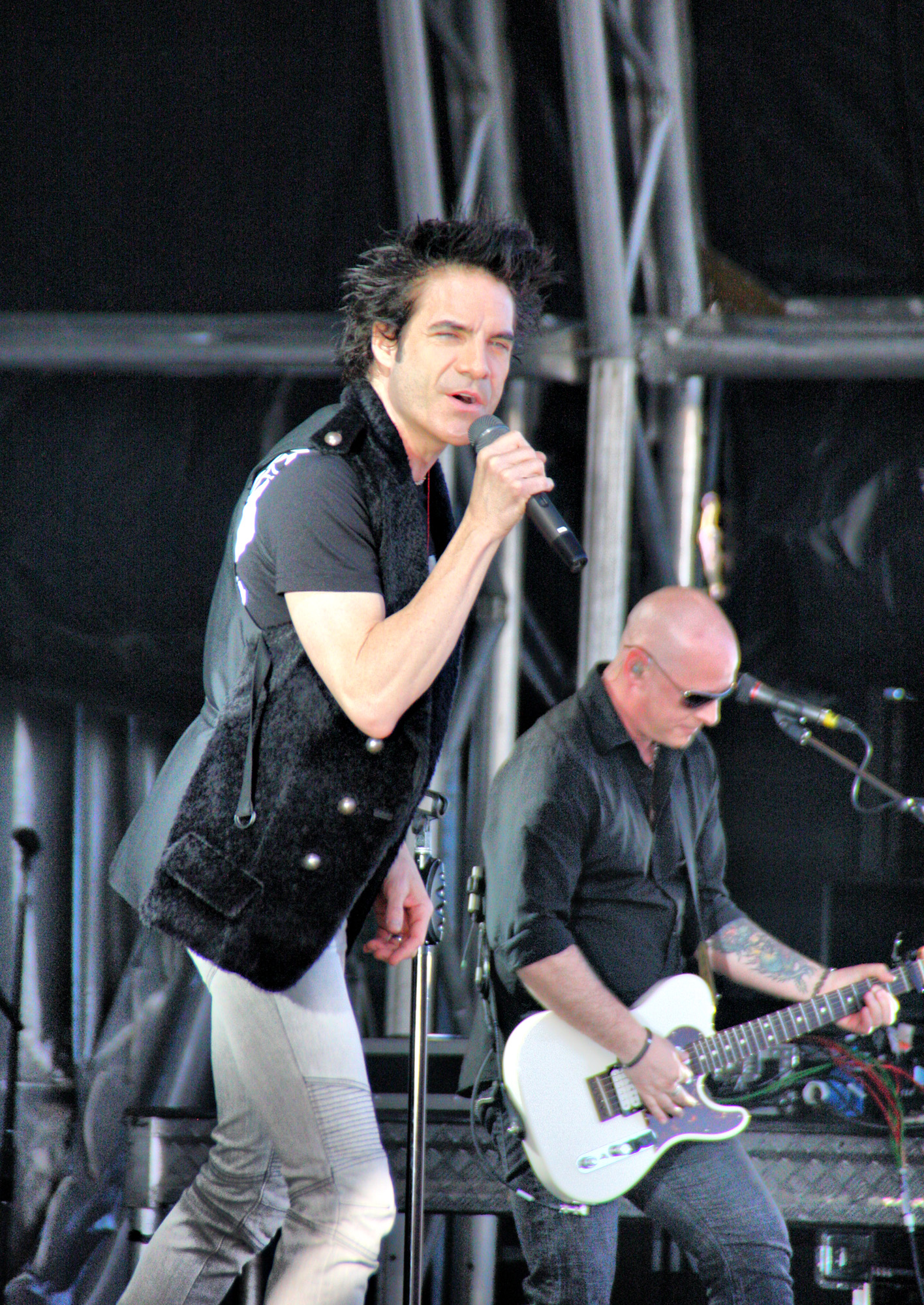
- Pat Monahan and Jimmy Stafford of Train performing in January 2011

Background information
- Origin: San Francisco, California, U.S.
- Genres: Pop rock; folk-pop; alternative rock; roots rock
- Years active: 1993–2006, 2009–present
- Labels: Atlantic; Warner Music; Columbia; Aware
- Members: Pat Monahan; Hector Maldonado; Jerry Becker; Matt Musty; Butch Walker
- Past members: Rob Hotchkiss; Jimmy Stafford; Scott Underwood; Charlie Colin; Johnny Colt; Brandon Bush; Drew Shoals; Luis Maldonado; Nikita Houston; Sakai Smith; Taylor Locke
- Website: savemesanfrancisco.com

Train is an American rock band from San Francisco which formed in 1993. As of 2025, the band consists of Pat Monahan (lead vocals), Butch Walker (guitar, vocals), Hector Maldonado (bass, vocals), Jerry Becker (keyboards, guitar), and Matt Musty (drums). The band has had many lineup changes, with Monahan serving as the sole constant original member.

With a lineup that included original members Monahan, Rob Hotchkiss, Jimmy Stafford, Scott Underwood, and Charlie Colin, the band achieved mainstream success with its debut album, Train. The album was released in 1998 with the hit "Meet Virginia". Train's 2001 album Drops of Jupiter contained the lead single—the RIAA Diamond-certified international hit "Drops of Jupiter (Tell Me)". The single won two Grammy Awards in 2002, and the album was certified double platinum. Train's third studio album, My Private Nation, released in 2003, was certified platinum in the United States with the hit "Calling All Angels". After the departures of Hotchkiss and Colin, the band released its fourth album, For Me, It's You, in 2006, with Brandon Bush (keyboards) and Johnny Colt (bass). Despite a generally positive reception from critics, the album was commercially unsuccessful. After this, Train went on a three-year hiatus from recording music.

In late 2009, Train regrouped as the trio of Monahan, Stafford, and Underwood to release the album Save Me, San Francisco, from which three singles—the RIAA 13× platinum-certified international hit "Hey, Soul Sister", "If It's Love" and "Marry Me"—reached numbers 3, 34, and 34, respectively, on the Billboard Hot 100. The album was certified gold by both the RIAA and ARIA. In 2012, Train released California 37. The first single from the album, "Drive By", reached number 10 on the Billboard Hot 100 and was a Top 10 hit in the UK. This album was followed by Bulletproof Picasso (2014), Christmas in Tahoe (2015), Train Does Led Zeppelin II (2016), A Girl, a Bottle, a Boat (2017), AM Gold (2022) and Mad Dog in the Fog (2026).

Train has sold over 10 million albums and 30 million tracks worldwide.

== History ==
=== 1993–1997: Formation ===
Following the dissolution of his Led Zeppelin cover band "Rogues Gallery", singer Pat Monahan left his hometown of Erie, Pennsylvania, in late 1993. He resettled in California and crossed paths with Berklee College of Music alumnus Rob Hotchkiss, who performed in coffee houses and local clubs. The two shared lead vocals, with Hotchkiss on guitar and harmonica, and Monahan playing percussion, including a modified conga attached to a kick-drum pedal. Hotchkiss had been the lead singer for L.A.-based Apostles. After deciding to form a full band, the duo recruited Jimmy Stafford (lead guitarist for The Apostles) on guitar, Charlie Colin on bass, and Scott Underwood on drums, thus solidifying Train's lineup in 1994. Train attempted to get signed under Columbia Records in 1996, but were rejected. Subsequently, the band decided to release their first self-titled CD independently. By 1997, they were touring nationally, opening concerts for bands such as Barenaked Ladies, Hootie & the Blowfish, Cracker and Counting Crows.

=== 1998–2000: Train ===
Train is the band's debut album. Initially released on Aware/RED, a joint venture with Columbia, A&R executive Tim Devine picked up the record for release on Columbia. The album was released on February 24, 1998, with a different track listing from its independent counterpart. It was self-produced for $25,000, and three singles from the album were released. The first single released, "Meet Virginia", was sent to adult album alternative radio in March 1998. In 2000, it became a top-20 hit on the Billboard Hot 100, peaking at number 20. The second single, "Free", was released in July 1998 and experienced success on pop/mainstream rock stations, and the third single was "I Am", released in 1999. The album brought the band national fame, and was certified platinum by the RIAA. Following the success of the debut album, the band began working on their second album.

Drops of Jupiter (Tell Me)
"Drops of Jupiter (Tell Me)" was the first single from Drops of Jupiter (2001).

=== 2001–2002: Drops of Jupiter ===
Drops of Jupiter, the band's second album, was produced by Brendan O' Brien, who has also worked with artists such as Pearl Jam, King's X, Bob Dylan, Bruce Springsteen & The E-Street Band and Neil Young. Before the release of the second album, the band released the single "Drops of Jupiter (Tell Me)". The song was a massive hit; it entered the Hot 100 on March 10, 2001, and spent 54 weeks on the chart before being relegated to the recurrents chart. The song won a Grammy Award for Best Rock Song, as well as a Grammy Award for Best Arrangement, which was written by Paul Buckmaster, known for his string arrangements for Elton John. (The band reportedly hired Buckmaster expressly to create a sound similar to his arrangement for John's "Burn Down the Mission".)

The album Drops of Jupiter was released on March 27, 2001, and became Train's first multi-platinum album, with the success of the lead single. The album was Train's first top ten album, peaking at number six on the Billboard 200. The album was also a top ten hit in the United Kingdom, where it peaked at number eight. "She's on Fire", the second single from Drops of Jupiter, was a modest success and was featured in the 2001 comedy The Animal and the 2003 animated comedy Rugrats Go Wild. The album was eventually certified double platinum in the United States and in Canada. It was also certified gold in Australia.

During the Drops of Jupiter tour, the band released a live DVD of a sold-out concert in the band's hometown of San Francisco at The Warfield. The DVD was titled Midnight Moon and featured Train's hits from the first two albums among others. The concert was recorded on May 26, 2001.

=== 2003–2004: My Private Nation ===
Calling All Angels
"Calling All Angels" was the first single from My Private Nation (2003), and Train's third song in the top 20 of the Billboard Hot 100.

In 2003, Rob Hotchkiss left the band citing creative differences. According to band interviews, he resented being pushed away as a songwriter and decided to leave. Hotchkiss started pursuing a solo career, after having contributed to six of the 11 songs on the (at the time) upcoming album My Private Nation. His solo album, the critically acclaimed Midnight Ghost, was released in 2004.

The band's third album, My Private Nation, was released in June 2003, with the lead single "Calling All Angels" becoming Train's third top 20 hit. "Calling All Angels" was a major hit on the Billboard Hot Adult Contemporary Tracks chart and has been certified RIAA Gold.

In October 2003, bassist Charlie Colin was forced to leave the band because of substance abuse. According to singer Pat Monahan, Colin was "a mess". After a live presentation in Oregon, Monahan called an emergency meeting and told the band that "you can have your bass player, or you can have your singer". He was replaced by Johnny Colt, bass player for the Black Crowes.

In 2004, their non-album song "Ordinary" was featured in the movie Spider-Man 2. In 2007, it was featured again, this time in the NBC series Heroes. The music video for "Ordinary" was in rotation on MTV, but the song only charted on the Adult Top 40 Tracks chart. In July 2005, after the song was featured in an advertising campaign for Cingular, the band released "Get to Me" as the final single from My Private Nation. "Get to Me" (written by Rob Hotchkiss and Pat Monahan) reached number nine on the Billboard Adult Top 40. Paul Buckmaster returned on "My Private Nation" with string arrangements for the tracks "Lincoln Avenue" and "Your Every Color". The album was certified platinum by the RIAA.

The band released their first live album, Alive at Last, in 2004, later winning a Radio Music Award for best artist.

=== 2005–2006: For Me, It's You ===
Cab
"Cab" the first single from For Me, It's You (2006), was the most popular song from the album.

Train began recording their fourth studio album, For Me, It's You, in Atlanta during the summer of 2005. They released the album's lead single, "Cab", on November 14, 2005. The song peaked at number nine on the Adult Top 40 Tracks chart. The album was released on January 31, 2006, and peaked at number ten on the Billboard 200 chart. However, it failed commercially, becoming the first album of the band's career to fail to receive an RIAA certification. The album was the band's only album to include members Johnny Colt on bass and Brandon Bush playing keyboard.

=== 2006–2008: Hiatus ===
Starting in November 2006, the band took a two-year hiatus from recording and touring to be with friends and family. The band's lead singer and songwriter Pat Monahan released a solo album, Last of Seven, on September 18, 2007. The album peaked at number 82 on the Billboard 200 chart. Two hit singles off of the album, "Her Eyes" and "Two Ways to Say Goodbye", charted at number 9 and number 21 on the Adult Top 40 with "Her Eyes" charting at number 10 on the Bubbling Under Hot 100 Singles as well. Pat Monahan also wrote "The Truth" for American Idol winner Kris Allen. "The Truth" charted at number 17 on the Adult Top 40.

=== 2009–2011: Save Me, San Francisco ===
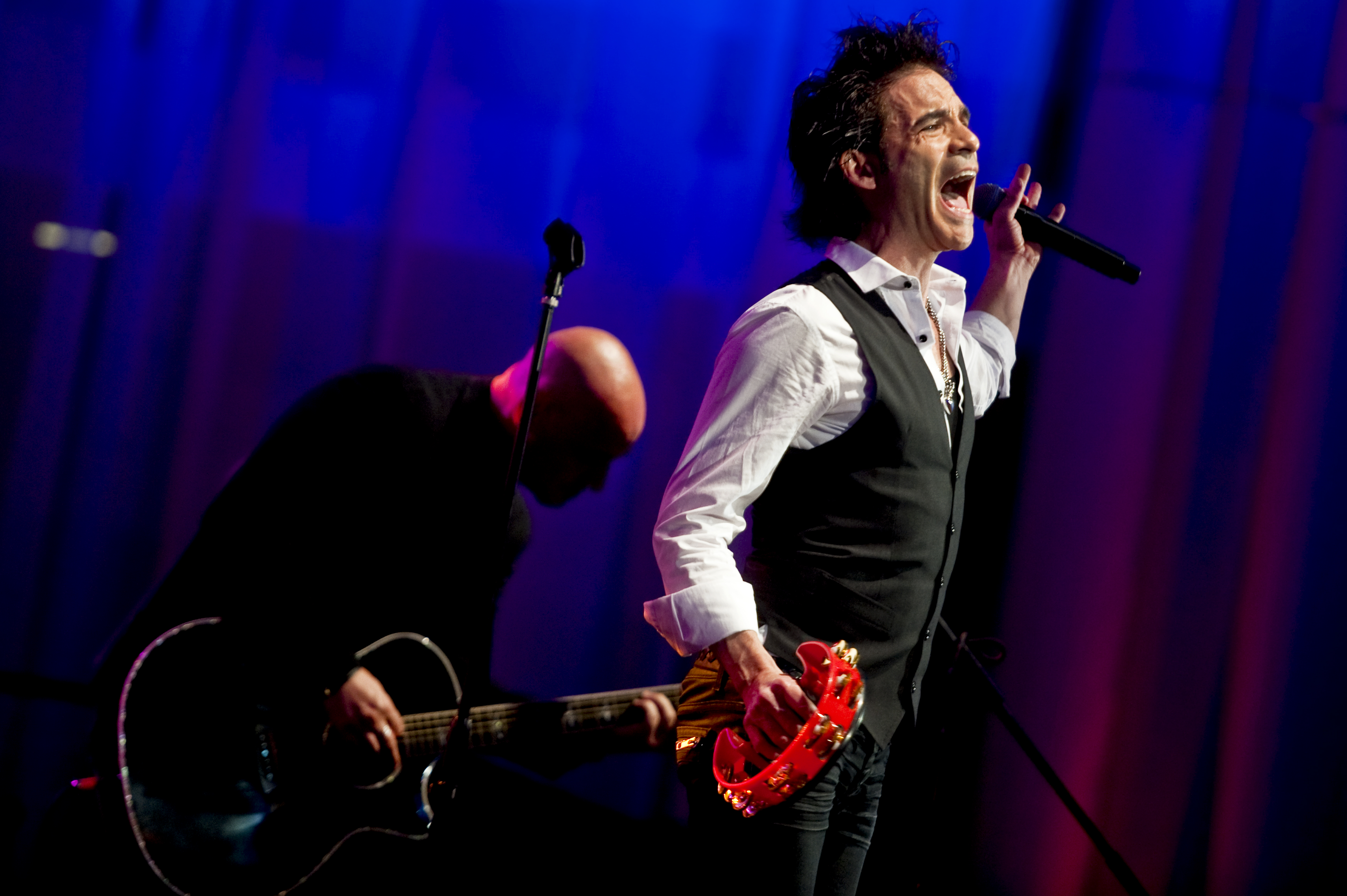
Patrick Monahan and Jimmy Stafford of Train, perform at the Stand Up for Heroes dinner in Washington, D.C., June 16, 2011

On August 11, 2009, Train released their first single in more than three years. Fall Out Boy's co-manager Jonathan Daniel helped Train begin their comeback after a couple of off years. The song "Hey, Soul Sister", from their fifth studio album, Save Me, San Francisco, was released on August 11, 2009, while the rest of the album was released about two and a half months later on October 27, 2009. The single was a major success, becoming their second-career top ten hit on the Billboard Hot 100 in its 16th week on the chart, after surging from number 23 to number seven during the week of January 30, 2010, largely because of an 81% increase in digital sales from the previous week. Like their earlier hit "Get to Me", this song gained further popularity when it was used as the commercial soundtrack to launch Samsung's 3D television during the Oscars. It is now their highest-charting single. "Hey, Soul Sister" is also the most played song in Australian radio history, the most downloaded iTunes song of 2010, the best-selling single in Columbia Records history, and has been certified RIAA 6 x platinum. The album itself peaked at number 17 on the Billboard 200 chart.

Train's second single from the album, "If It's Love", peaked at number 34, making it their most successful secondary single from any record. "If It's Love" has been RIAA certified gold. Train released the third single from the record, "Marry Me", on October 25, 2010. It debuted on the Billboard Hot 100 at number 95, the first time Train have had three consecutive singles on this chart. The song peaked at number 34 on the Billboard Hot 100 chart. "Marry Me" was featured on One Tree Hill on February 1, 2011. "Marry Me" has been certified RIAA Gold. Train released a Christmas single called "Shake Up Christmas", which was featured in commercials internationally as part of Coca-Cola's Christmas commercial series in 2010. The single charted at number 12 on the "Billboard Hot Adult Contemporary Tracks". The single also charted at #99 on Billboard's Hot 100. Train's single "Save Me, San Francisco" peaked at number 75 on the Billboard Hot 100, at 22 on the Adult Contemporary chart, and 7 on the Adult Pop Songs chart.

=== 2012–2013: California 37 ===
"Drive By", the lead single off of Train's sixth studio album, was released worldwide on January 10, 2012. It peaked at number ten on the Billboard Hot 100, as well as reaching Platinum certifications in Australia, New Zealand, and the United States.

On April 13, 2012, Train released their sixth studio album, California 37. According to Monahan, much of it was written while the group was touring Save Me, San Francisco. "I didn't spend 3 months or 5 months writing, I just wrote throughout the course of the last 3 years," said Monahan. "We have 13 songs that we've recorded and I want to hear every single one of them over and over again." The album release was preceded by a promotional single of "Feels Good at First" on March 21, for iTunes Store customers who pre-ordered the album. The album debuted at number 10 on the UK Albums Chart, and became their highest-charting album since Drops of Jupiter which peaked at number six in 2001. In the United States, California 37 debuted at number four on the Billboard 200 with first-week sales of 76,000 copies. It is their fourth top 10 album and their highest-charting album in the US.

Train's next single, "50 Ways to Say Goodbye", was released on June 11, with its "self-deprecating lyrics about the failure in gracefully ending a relationship" coupled with "slightly tacky mariachi horns". It peaked at number 20 on the Billboard Hot 100, and charted for 12 weeks. and was certified gold by the RIAA on September 20. For the summer of 2012, Train toured mostly on the east coast of the United States.

In late July, Train demanded that the Family First New Zealand, an organization that opposes same-sex marriage in New Zealand, refrain from the unauthorized use of "Marry Me" from its "Protect Marriage" website.

In November, Train released "Bruises", a country-oriented duet with Ashley Monroe. The song has also been recorded with different female singers: for Canada, the song was recorded in both English and French with Marilou, and for Australia with Delta Goodrem.

In December, Train released the single "Mermaid". The group would later film the song's video at the 2013 Pro Bowl in Honolulu.

Train was scheduled to perform at the Boy Scouts of America's 2013 National Scout Jamboree, along with singer Carly Rae Jepsen. In March 2013, both backed out of performing for the event and cited the controversy over the BSA policy on gays as the reason. Train released a statement saying the band "strongly opposes any kind of policy that questions the equality of any American citizen ... We look forward to participating in the Jamboree this summer, as long as they make the right decision before then". The Boy Scout Jamboree subsequently brought in Three Doors Down as the headlining band.

Train toured the United States and Canada from July 11 to August 14, 2013, in 25 headlining shows titled Mermaids of Alcatraz Tour. The tour included singer Gavin DeGraw, The Script, Michael Franti & Spearhead. Country music singer Ashley Monroe joined part of the tour, singing "Bruises" and one or two of her songs from her album during Train's set.

=== 2014–2015: Bulletproof Picasso ===
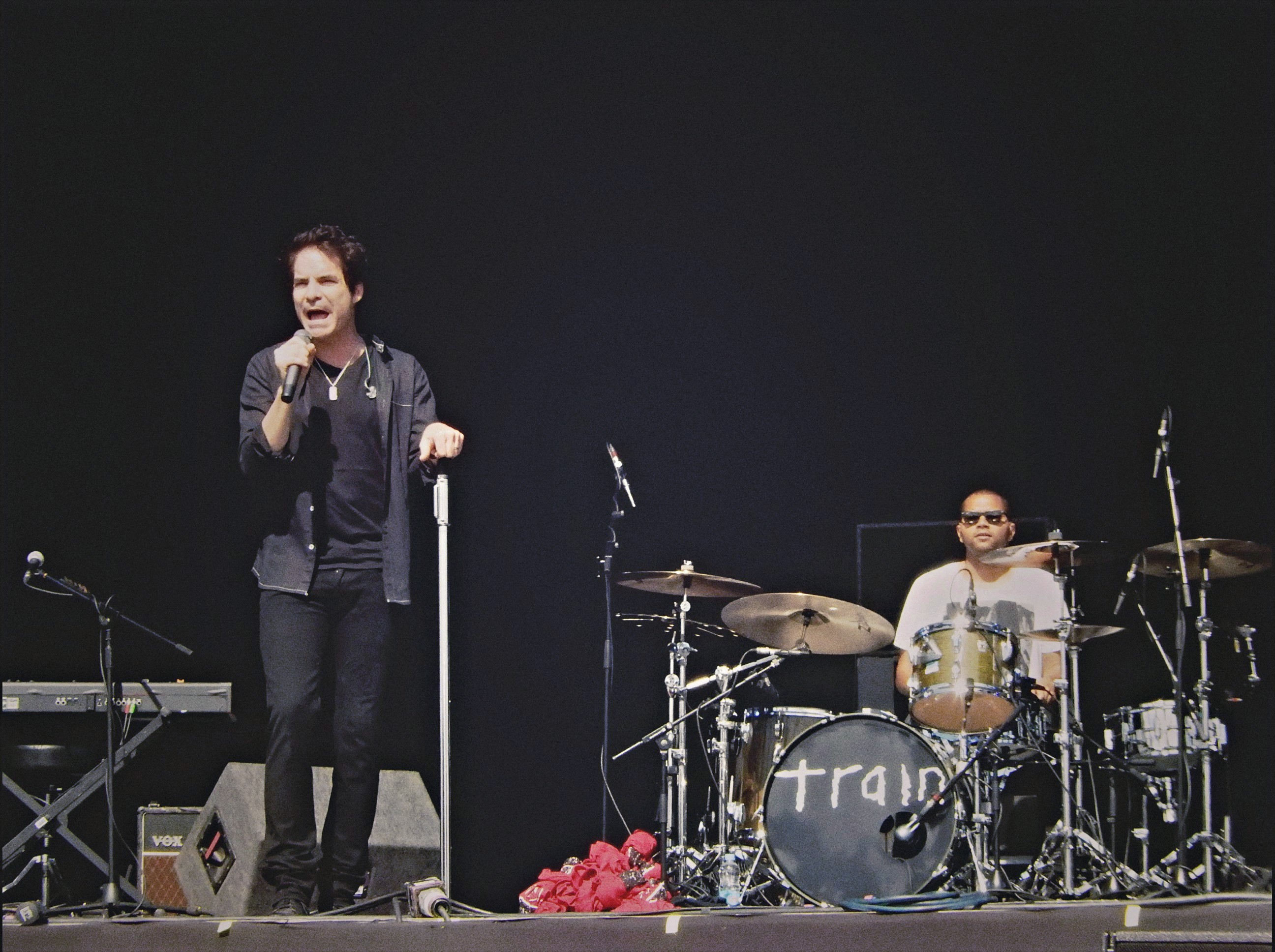
V Festival 2014, Chelmsford

In November 2013, Train announced plans for a new album to be released in the summer of 2014. On May 5, 2014, guitarist Jimmy Stafford tweeted: "An anagram of the first single from the new @train album is now available! SGIJANNULAEBENEL. Yep." which fans quickly deciphered and replied "Angel in Blue Jeans". On June 5, 2014, Scott Underwood posted a message thanking fans for their support as he left to pursue writing, producing, and other music-related ventures. He had been in the band for 20 years, and was replaced by Drew Shoals. At the time of release, the only original members left were Pat Monahan and guitarist Jimmy Stafford. On June 9, 2014, it was announced that the album would be titled Bulletproof Picasso. The album is led by the single "Angel in Blue Jeans" written by the Norwegian Duo "Espionage". It was released the same day as the album's announcement. The single peaked at number 79 on the US Billboard Hot 100 and at number 8 on the US Adult Top 40 (Billboard). The rest of the album was released on September 12, 2014, in Germany and Australia, September 15, 2014, in France, and September 16, 2014, in the United States. The album peaked at number five on the Billboard 200.

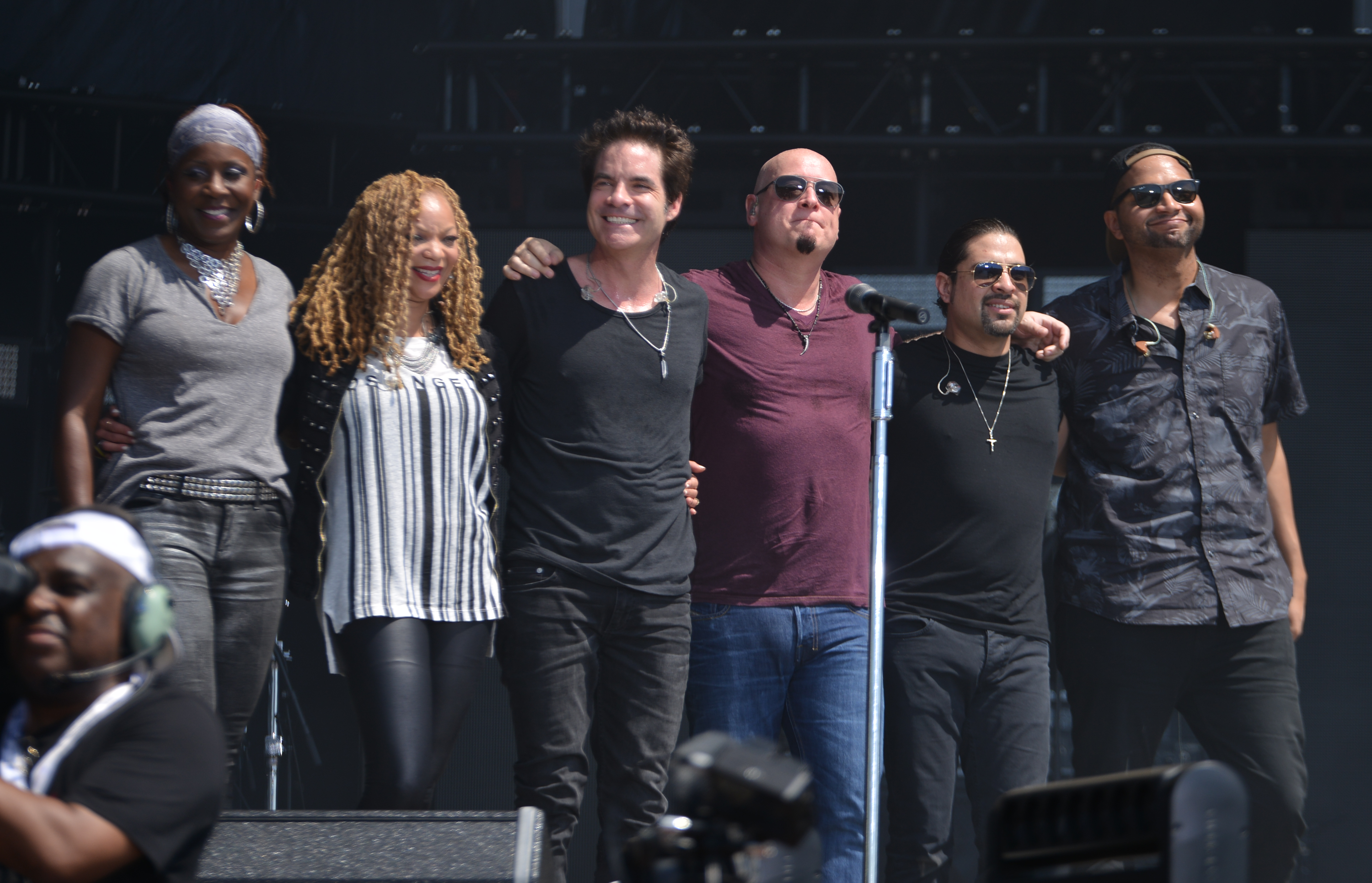
Train in 2015

On September 29, 2014, Train released the second single from the album, "Cadillac, Cadillac". It peaked at number 21 on the US Adult Top 40 (Billboard). On January 26, 2015, Train released the third single from the album, "Bulletproof Picasso". It peaked at number 22 on the US Adult Top 40 (Billboard). On May 19, 2015, Train released their fourth and final single from the album, "Give It All". It peaked at number 35 on the US Adult Top 40 (Billboard).

On May 21, 2015, Train began their tour for the album, referred to as the Picasso at the Wheel Tour. Joining them on the tour were The Fray and Matt Nathanson. They played at over 40 venues across the United States until the tour concluded on July 25, 2015.

Although the album peaked high on the Billboard 200 and all four of its singles made a spot on the US Adult Top 40 (Billboard), none of the singles were subsequent hits, thus making it fail commercially. It also failed to receive an RIAA certification, the band's first album since For Me, It's You to do so.

=== 2015: Christmas in Tahoe ===
On May 14, 2015, it was announced the band was recording a Christmas album. The album, titled Christmas in Tahoe, was released on November 13, 2015, exclusively on Amazon, and is their eighth overall studio album. The album features 15 songs, 12 of which are covers of other holiday songs, and three of them being original songs. It peaked at number 151 on the US Billboard Hot 100 and number 10 on the US Top Holiday Albums (Billboard). On December 5, 2016, just over a year after the album was released, Train's cover of "This Christmas" charted at number one on Billboard's Adult Contemporary Chart.

=== 2016: Train Does Led Zeppelin II ===
In June 2016, Train released their first cover album, and ninth overall studio album, titled Train Does Led Zeppelin II. The album was a song by song replication of the classic 1969 Led Zeppelin album. The band's website announcement stated: "We're paying homage to one of our biggest musical inspirations with the release of Train Does Led Zeppelin II. All of the band's proceeds from this release will support Family House." The band also launched a brief club tour that same month to support the album. Gigs included New York, Los Angeles, Seattle and the final date in San Francisco. The sets consisted entirely of Led Zeppelin covers, and featured no regular band material. They also appeared on Jimmy Kimmel Live on June 10 and played "Heartbreaker" and "Living Loving Maid (She's Just A Woman)". The album peaked at number 71 on the US Billboard 200.

=== 2016–2018: a girl a bottle a boat ===
Beginning with live performances on tour in August 2016, Train performed a new song, titled "Play That Song". It was officially released on September 29, 2016, as the lead single to their tenth studio album, a girl a bottle a boat, which was released four months later on January 27, 2017. "Play That Song" uses the melody from the 1938 song "Heart and Soul".

On October 8, 2016, lead guitarist Jimmy Stafford posted on Twitter that he had left the band. Although he performed "Play That Song" and other new songs from the album prior to its release, he did not play on the new album. Stafford quoted on Twitter that "We're both in a great space. Pat is making the records he wants to make and I'm still around." He attended the annual Train cruise "Sail Across the Sun" in February 2017.

On December 1, 2016, the album was made available for pre-order and the track listing was revealed. On the same day, the song "Working Girl" was released as the first promotional single from the album. The second promotional single, titled "Lottery", was released on December 16, 2016. Just under a month later, the third promotional single from the album, titled "The News", was released on January 13, 2017. On January 19, 2017, along with releasing the fourth promotional single from the album titled "Drink Up", Train announced the official tour for the album titled the "Play That Song Tour". The tour occurred from May 12, 2017, to July 15, 2017, in the United States, and featured two opening acts: O.A.R. and Natasha Bedingfield. The tour briefly continued overseas from October 12, 2017, to October 25, 2017. Jimmy Stafford posted on Twitter that he would not rejoin the band for the Play That Song Tour. He posted that his absence wasn't his call and that he would have loved to have been part of the tour.

On January 22, 2018, Train announced a summer 2018 tour with Daryl Hall and John Oates. It ran from May 1, 2018, through August 11, 2018. To celebrate the tour, the artists collaborated on a new single titled "Philly Forget Me Not", which was released on March 29, 2018. A couple months later, on May 24, 2018, Train released another new single with artists Cam and Travie McCoy titled "Call Me Sir".

=== 2018–2021: Greatest Hits ===
On October 12, 2018, Train announced a greatest hits album simply titled Greatest Hits. The album was released on November 9, 2018, and featured 16 of the band's songs. The album also featured a bonus song, a cover of the hit George Michael song "Careless Whisper".

At the end of 2018, drummer Drew Shoals left the band to resume his law career. In June 2019, Matt Musty joined Train for their spring and summer appearances.

On November 15, 2019, the band released a new single titled "Mai Tais", featuring artist Skylar Grey.

On May 22, 2020, the band released a new single titled "Rescue Dog". A portion of the proceeds went to North Shore Animal League America.

In May 2021, Luis Maldonado left to join Foreigner following the retirement of Thom Gimbel. Replacing him on lead guitar is Taylor Locke, from the band Rooney, who first played with them during their summer 2021 tour.

=== 2022–2025: AM Gold ===
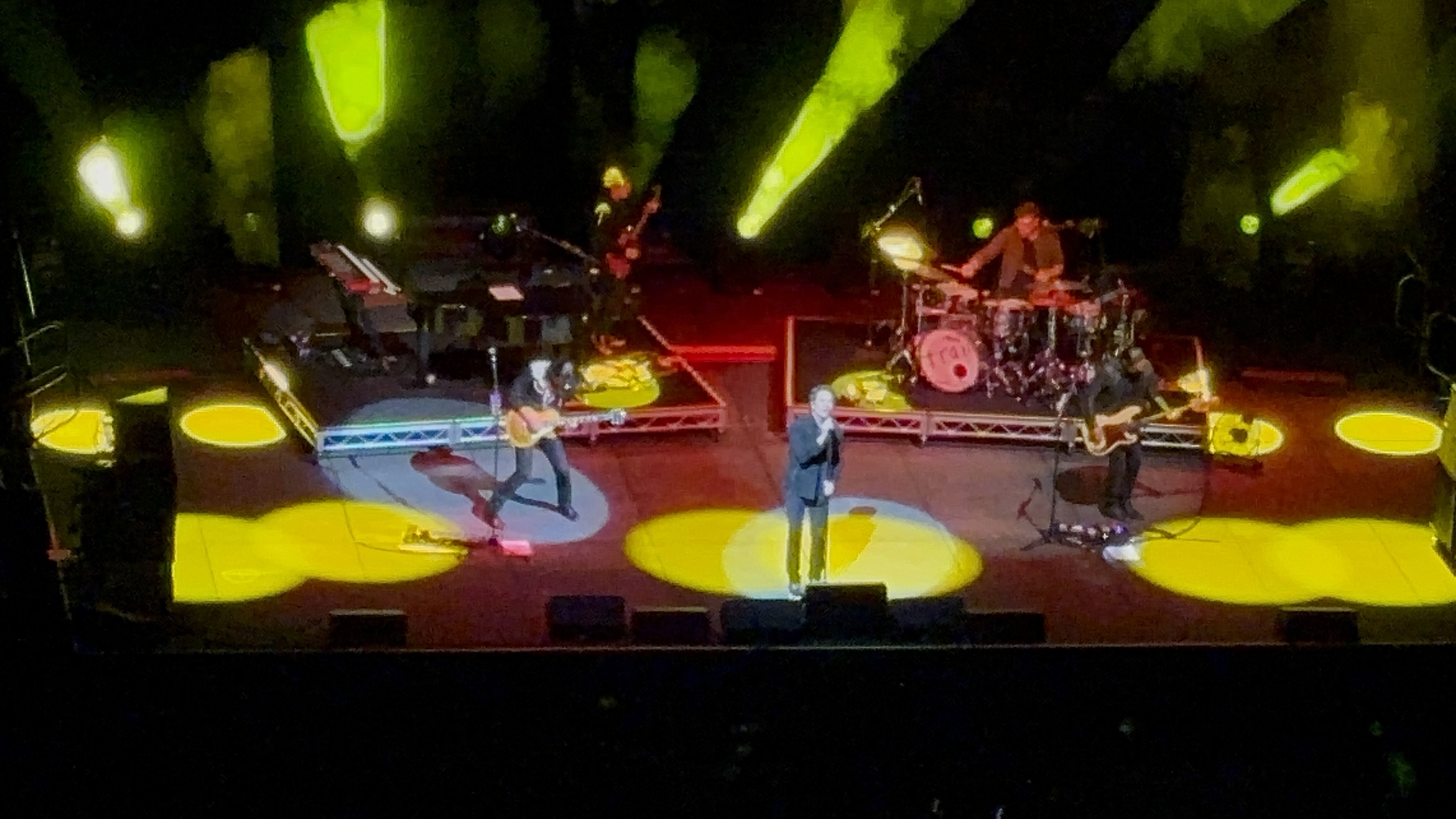
Train performing in Sydney, Australia in May 2025.

On February 16, 2022, the band released a single titled "AM Gold" and announced that an album with the same name would be released on May 20, 2022, marking their first new studio album in over five years. A North American tour for the album was also set to occur throughout the summer of 2022. A remix featuring Melanie C was released on April 22, 2022.

On April 14, 2022, the first promotional single from the album was released, entitled "Running Back (Trying to Talk to You)". The following month, the band released two more promotional singles from the album: "Turn the Radio Up" featuring Jewel on May 6, and "Cleopatra" featuring Sofía Reyes on May 18. On May 20, 2022, Train officially released their ninth studio album AM Gold.

On June 23, 2023, the band released a new single titled "I Know", featuring Tenille Townes and Bryce Vine.

On April 24, 2024, the band released a new single titled "Long Yellow Dress". On May 22, 2024, it was announced that former band member Charlie Colin had died.

On July 26, 2024, the band released a live album of their April 30, 2024 concert at Royal Albert Hall in London entitled Live at Royal Albert Hall. In early 2025, Butch Walker joined the band as the lead guitarist.

=== 2026–present: Mad Dog in the Fog ===
Their twelfth studio album, Mad Dog in the Fog, was released on August 28, 2026. The album is named after a bar of the same name in San Francisco. It was preceded by three singles. The first being "The Weekend", released on March 5, 2026, the second being "Pennsylvania Turnpike", released on June 11, 2026 and the third being the titular track, released on July 30, 2026.

From July 8 to August 30, 2026, Train embarked on the tour Drops of Jupiter: 25 Years in the Atmosphere to celebrate the title album's 25th anniversary, as well as promote their new music. They were joined by opening acts Barenaked Ladies and Matt Nathanson.

== Performances and media appearances ==
This is a list of major performances by Train at various events and television shows. It does not include concerts from their regular tours.

Date	Event	Notes
April 14, 2002	MTV Icon episode "Aerosmith"	Event was recorded on April 14, and broadcast on April 17. Performed "Dream On"
December 16, 2009	CSI: NY episode "Second Chances"	Performed "Hey, Soul Sister" and "Calling All Angels". Monahan is questioned as a possible suspect.
May 26, 2010	Bon Jovi concert, MetLife Stadium	special guest star, opener
July 12, 2010	2010 Major League Baseball Home Run Derby, Angel Stadium of Anaheim	Performed "Calling All Angels" prior to the contest
July 21, 2010	America's Got Talent	performed "Hey, Soul Sister" from their album Save Me, San Francisco
November 21, 2010	American Music Awards of 2010	performed "Marry Me" and "Hey, Soul Sister" from their album Save Me, San Francisco
March 12, 2011	Shakira's The Sun Comes Out World Tour, Bogotá	
April 8, 2011	San Francisco Giants home opener	Performed "Save Me, San Francisco" and sang the National Anthem
January 2, 2012	2012 Discover Orange Bowl, Miami Gardens	Halftime show
February 26, 2012	2012 Daytona 500	Monahan sang the National Anthem
March 27, 2012	Late Show with David Letterman	Performed "Drive By"
March 27, 2012	The Howard Stern Show	Performed "Drive By" and three other songs including a Van Halen cover
April 1, 2012	Academy of Country Music Awards	Performed "Marry Me" with Martina McBride
April 17, 2012	Dancing with the Stars (United States)	Performed "Drive By"
May 22, 2012	Opie and Anthony, Sirius XM	Performed acoustic set
May 22, 2012	Q102 Springle Ball 2012	Performed "Drive By", "Hey, Soul Sister", and "Drops of Jupiter"
May 25, 2012 (Note: Train's performance was taped on May 24, 2012, and broadcast on May 25, 2012.)	The View	Performed "Drive By" for Elisabeth Hasselbeck's birthday celebration
June 10, 2012	Dancing with the Stars (Australia)	Performed "Drive By"
July 12, 2012	Microsoft Worldwide Partner Conference, Toronto, Ontario, Canada	
August 29, 2012	Live on Letterman	performed "50 Ways To Say Goodbye", "If It's Love", "Save Me, San Francisco", "Calling All Angels", "Meet Virginia", "Bruises", "Drive By", "Drops of Jupiter", and "Hey, Soul Sister"
September 24, 2012	Sesame Street episode "Get Lost, Mr. Chips"	season opener, performed "Five By", a parody of "Drive By", with Elmo and Count von Count
October 28, 2012	NFL game "St. Louis Rams vs. New England Patriots", Wembley Stadium, London	Pre-game performance
December 19, 2012	Miss Universe 2012	Performed "Drive By", "Mermaid", and "Shake Up Christmas".
December 31, 2012	New Year's Eve in Times Square	Performed "Mermaid" and cover of John Lennon's "Imagine", the latter of which was featured on NBC
January 27, 2013	2013 Pro Bowl	Pre-game performance
February 1, 2013	VH1's The Best Super Bowl Concert Ever	
July 26, 2013	Today	Toyota Concert Series
January 31, 2014	The Howard Stern Birthday Bash	house band for the evening's festivities to celebrate Howard Stern's 60th birthday
June 9, 2014	The Howard Stern Show	performed "Angel in Blue Jeans" and announced the title of their new album
September 17, 2014	America's Got Talent	performed "Drops of Jupiter" with Sons of Serendip and "Angel in Blue Jeans"
October 5, 2014	2014 NRL Grand Final	Pre-match entertainment for Australia's National Rugby League Grand Final at Stadium Australia in Sydney, playing "Hey, Soul Sister", "Angel in Blue Jeans", and "Drops of Jupiter".
October 12, 2014	The Talk	performed "Angel in Blue Jeans" from their album Bulletproof Picasso
November 24, 2014	The Queen Latifah Show	performed "Cadillac, Cadillac" from their album Bulletproof Picasso
April 13, 2015	Today	performed "Bulletproof Picasso" from their album Bulletproof Picasso
November 15, 2015	Pandora's Holiday Celebrations on Ice	Performance from Greensboro Coliseum, Greensboro, N.C. Aired on ABC late November (29) and mid-December (13). Train played selections from their holiday album Christmas in Tahoe, as well as a few of their biggest hits. Among the songs Train performed: "Shake Up Christmas", "What Christmas Means to Me", "Have Yourself a Merry Little Christmas", "The River" and more.
December 23, 2015	WWE	performed "Merry Christmas Everybody" from their album Christmas in Tahoe
June 3, 2016	The Howard Stern Show	performed songs from their album Train Does Led Zeppelin II
June 10, 2016	Jimmy Kimmel Live!	performed "Heartbreaker" and "Living Loving Maid (She's Just a Woman)" from their album Train Does Led Zeppelin II
November 22, 2016	Dancing with the Stars	performed "Play That Song" from their album A Girl, a Bottle, a Boat
December 14, 2016	Harry	performed "Play That Song" from their album A Girl, a Bottle, a Boat
January 27, 2017	Good Morning America	performed "Play That Song" and "Drink Up" from their album A Girl, a Bottle, a Boat
February 25, 2017	2017 Coors Light NHL Stadium Series	performed songs from their album A Girl, a Bottle, a Boat
March 10, 2017	The View	performed "Play That Song" from their album A Girl, a Bottle, a Boat
March 24, 2017	Dr. Ken	performed "Marry Me" from their album Save Me, San Francisco and "Play That Song" from their album A Girl, a Bottle, a Boat
April 30, 2017 (Note: Train's performance was taped on April 29, 2017, and broadcast on April 30, 2017.)	2017 Radio Disney Music Awards	performed "Play That Song" from their album A Girl, a Bottle, a Boat
May 5, 2017	The Talk	performed "Play That Song" from their album A Girl, a Bottle, a Boat
November 29, 2017	Today	performed "Shake Up Christmas" from their albums Save Me, San Francisco (Golden Gate Edition) and Christmas in Tahoe
December 28, 2017	Today	performed "Valentine" from their album A Girl, a Bottle, a Boat
July 30, 2018	Jimmy Kimmel Live!	performed "Call Me Sir" with Cam and Travie McCoy
December 21, 2018	CBS	performed songs from their album Christmas in Tahoe
November 15, 2019	Magnum P.I. episode "He Came by Night" (S2-E8)	performed "Hey, Soul Sister" and "Mai Tais" with Skylar Grey
August 27, 2026	Outside The Mad Dog in the Fog bar, Haight St, San Francisco	A 1-hour performance to launch their new album Mad Dog in the Fog where it all started.

They did a VH1 episode of Crossroads with Martina McBride (2011).

== Related ventures ==
Train founded the Save Me, San Francisco Wine Company in 2011. With a partnership with ACME Wine Movers, the business sells wine that is named after the group's various hits, which include: Drops of Jupiter California Red, Calling All Angels Chardonnay, Soul Sister Pinot Noir, California 37 Cabernet Sauvignon, and Hella Fine Merlot. The wine is made in the Livermore Valley. The company partnered with Ghirardelli Chocolate Company to sell chocolates and confections to pair with the wine. A portion of the proceeds go to the Family House of San Francisco, which supports families of children with cancer and other life-threatening illnesses.

Train supported Little Kids Rock along with COUNTRY Financial through the Road Trips and Guitar Picks campaign. In addition to raising money and autographing a guitar for auction, Train met with and sang "Hey, Soul Sister" with some Little Kids Rock students in Atlanta.

== In popular culture ==
"Calling All Angels" became an unofficial anthem of the Los Angeles Angels baseball team: it was played at Angel Stadium before every game during the 2010 season, while the video screen showed a montage of the team's history.

"Calling All Angels" was featured at the ending montage of the TV series One Tree Hill episode "Life in a Glass House". "Marry Me" was featured on the episode "The Other Half of Me".

The album's second single, "When I Look to the Sky", was used for the trailer of the 2004 film Jersey Girl.

The TV series CSI:NY features Train's songs "Hey, Soul Sister" and "Calling All Angels" in the season six episode "Second Chances".

The band was parodied in the "Band Face-Off" sketch on the January 26, 2013 airing of Saturday Night Live, in which they invade a bar, have conflict with Adam Levine (the episode's guest host) of the band Maroon 5, and are later joined by Jason Mraz and John Mayer. Train made a statement afterwards that they approved of the parody. The band was parodied on the show again in October 2024, where Andrew Dismukes performed the song "Hey, Soul Sister" to Ego Nwodim as part of a sketch sending up interracial marriage in the 1950s.

== Band members ==
=== Current members ===
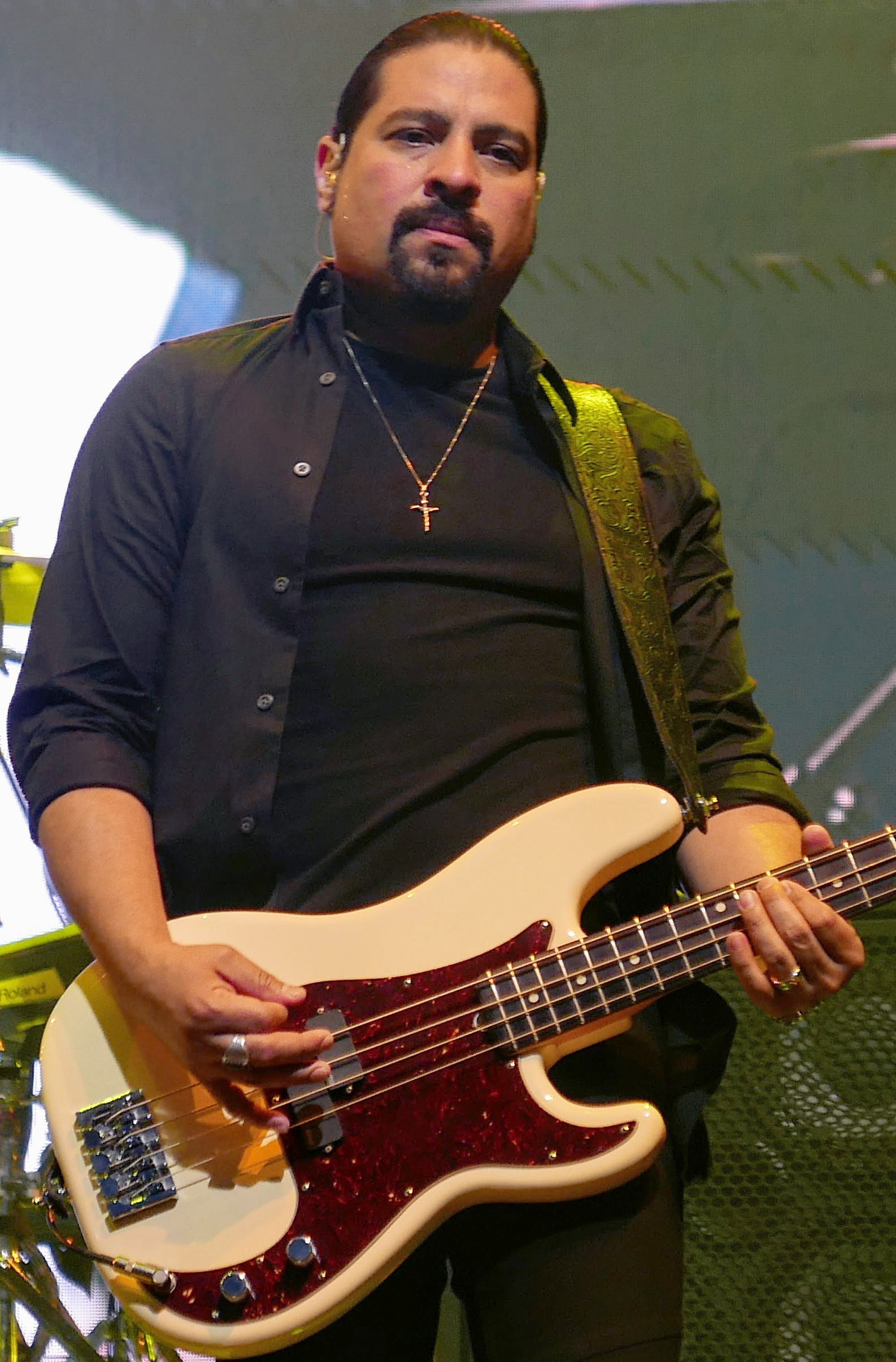
Hector Maldonado, performing in 2018

- Pat Monahan – lead vocals, percussion, occasional trumpet and saxophone (1994–2006, 2009–present), drums (1994)
- Jerry Becker – keyboards, rhythm guitar, backing vocals (2009–present)
- Hector Maldonado – bass, backing vocals (2009–present)
- Matt Musty – drums, percussion (2019–present)
- Butch Walker – lead guitar, backing vocals (2025–present)

=== Former members ===
- Rob Hotchkiss – rhythm guitar, backing vocals (1994–2003), lead guitar, bass (1994)
- Jimmy Stafford – lead guitar, backing vocals (1994–2006, 2009–2016), rhythm guitar (2003–2006, 2009–2014)
- Charlie Colin – bass (1994–2003; died 2024)
- Scott Underwood – drums, percussion (1994–2006, 2009–2014), keyboards (1994–2003, 2009–2014)
- Brandon Bush – keyboards (2003–2006)
- Johnny Colt – bass (2003–2006)
- Drew Shoals – drums, percussion (2014–2019)
- Luis Maldonado – lead guitar, backing vocals (2016–2021)
- Nikita Houston – backing vocals (2012–2024)
- Sakai Smith – backing vocals (2012–2024)
- Taylor Locke – lead guitar, backing vocals (2021–2025)

=== Former touring musicians ===
- Kevin Costello – keyboards, bass (1998–2003)
- Tony Lopacinski – rhythm and lead guitar (2004–2005)
- Ana Lenchantin – cello, percussion, backing vocals (2011)
- Brian Switzer – trumpet (2012–2014)

== Discography ==
=== Studio albums ===
- Train (1998)
- Drops of Jupiter (2001)
- My Private Nation (2003)
- For Me, It's You (2006)
- Save Me, San Francisco (2009)
- California 37 (2012)
- Bulletproof Picasso (2014)
- Christmas in Tahoe (2015)
- Train Does Led Zeppelin II (2016)
- A Girl, a Bottle, a Boat (2017)
- AM Gold (2022)
- Mad Dog in the Fog (2026)

== Tours ==
=== Headlining ===
- Train Tour (1999)
- Drops of Jupiter Tour (2001–2002)
- Alive at Last Tour (2004)
- For Me, It's You Tour (2006)
- Save Me, San Francisco Tour (2009–2011)
- California 37 Tour (2012)
- Mermaids of Alcatraz Tour (2013)
- Picasso at the Wheel Tour (2015)
- Play That Song Tour (2017)
- 2021 Tour (2021)
- AM Gold Tour (2022)
- Definitely Not A Tour (2023)
- I Know, It's Been A Long Time Coming Tour (2024)
- NZ & Aus Tour (2025)
- VeszprémFest, Veszprém, Hungary (July 2025)
- Drops of Jupiter: 25 Years in the Atmosphere (2026)

=== Co-headlining ===
- 2011 Summer Tour (2011) (with Maroon 5)
- Summer 2018 Tour (2018) (with Hall & Oates)
- New Summer Road Trip Tour (2024) (with REO Speedwagon)

== See also ==
- List of bands from the San Francisco Bay Area
