= Charlie Colin =

American musician (1966–2024)

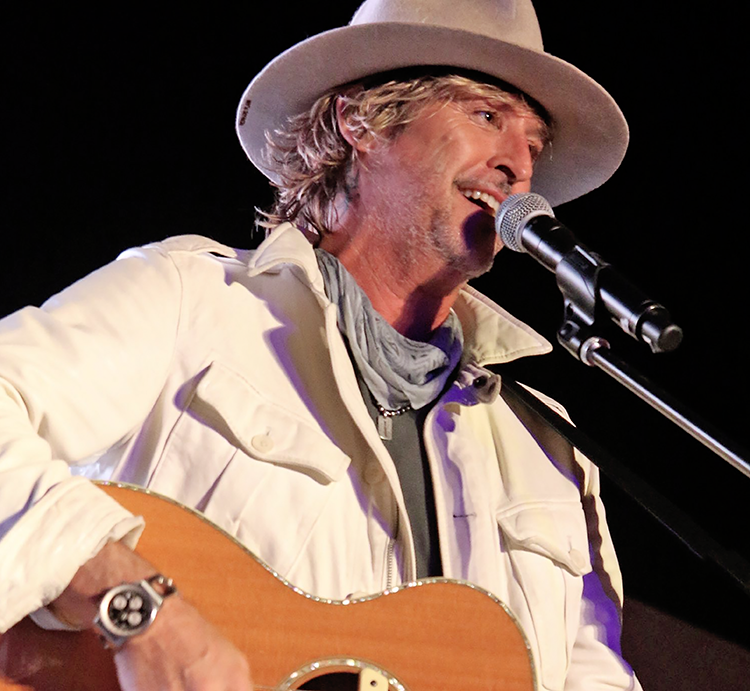
- Colin in 2017

Background information
- Born: November 22, 1966; Newport Beach, California, U.S.
- Died: c. May 17, 2024 (aged 57) Brussels, Belgium
- Genres: Rock; roots rock; pop rock; alternative rock
- Instruments: Bass; guitar; vocals
- Years active: 1992–2024
- Labels: Columbia; Aware Records
- Formerly of: Train; The Side Deal

Charlie Colin (November 22, 1966 – c. May 17, 2024) was an American musician. He was the bassist for the rock band Train, of which he was a founding member. He also played guitar and provided background vocals for many other bands after his departure from the group in 2003.

== Early life ==
Charlie Colin was born in Newport Beach, California on November 22, 1966. He began playing guitar at about eight when he lived in Virginia. Later, his family moved back to Newport Beach, California. At Newport Harbor High School surfing, playing water polo, and the guitar became his constant companions.

== Career ==
=== Berklee College of Music ===
Colin attended University of Southern California to explore his artistic gifts; then he transferred halfway to focus primarily on his musical gifts at Berklee College of Music in Boston. Attending Berklee got Colin fully immersed in music. He started playing with seniors for lessons and so he could learn more. Pat Metheny was "quite a discovery", as well as other kinds of music discovered during Berklee.

Shortly afterwards, Colin got an offer from some friends to go to Singapore to write and play jingles.

=== Apostles ===
After Singapore, Colin, Jimmy Stafford (Train's future lead guitarist and mandolin player), and Rob Hotchkiss moved to Los Angeles and started the group Apostles. The group got a record deal and recorded the album Apostles in 1992. When the label folded, the members went their own ways but had a hunch that one day they would end up back together.

=== Train ===
Hotchkiss moved to San Francisco and met Pat Monahan, Train's future lead singer. The two collaborated on songs in the Bay Area and invited Jimmy Stafford to be the guitarist and Colin as the bassist. Colin brought in Scott Underwood to play drums. Thus formed in 1993. Train became very successful. Train scored their first top-20 hit with 1999's "Meet Virginia", although their big breakthrough came with 2001's "Drops of Jupiter", which reached No. 5. The album Drops of Jupiter reached No. 6 on the Billboard 200. The group toured nationally, opening concerts for Hootie & the Blowfish, Sheryl Crow, Counting Crows, and Barenaked Ladies.

In 2003, Colin was fired from the band after an emergency meeting due to his substance abuse.

=== Food Pill ===
During the autumn of 2002, after Train finished promoting Drops of Jupiter with Matchbox Twenty, Scott Underwood and Colin moved to a "huge psychedelic mansion" called The Paramour in West Hollywood to collaborate and record music. They decided to call the collaboration Food Pill and their first album was called Elixir.

In 2014, Colin replaced Jesse Vest of Days of the New on bass so the band could continue touring.

=== Painbirds ===
In 2015, Colin and Hotchkiss put together a band called Painbirds, with Sausalito singer-songwriter Tom Luce from Luce, whose song "Good Day" cracked the bottom of the Adult Top 40 in 2001. This band released six songs on an eponymous debut EP.

=== The Side Deal ===
The Side Deal is an American band from Newport Beach, California. The band was formed in 2017 by Colin, Stan Frazier of Sugar Ray, and brothers Joel and Scott Owen of The PawnShop Kings. The Side Deal performed live with other notable artists such as Jeff "Skunk" Baxter of The Doobie Brothers, Steely Dan, and Alice Cooper.

In 2019, Colin appeared on guitar/bass and vocals while recording Featherborn for musician and vocalist Danny Beissel at the iconic Blackbird Studio in Nashville with veteran engineer John McBride.

Colin was a longstanding curator, art collector, homeless-artist advocate, and philanthropist.

== Later life and death ==
Colin later moved to Brussels, Belgium to teach a music master class at a conservatory. At the time of his death, he also was serving as musical director for the Newport Beach Film Festival, per his social media profiles.

Colin was found dead in a friend's home in Brussels on May 17, 2024 after slipping and falling in a shower. He was house-sitting for the friend at the time of his death.

== Awards and nominations ==
=== Grammy Awards ===
- 2002 | Drops of Jupiter (Tell Me) | Best Rock Song | Won
- 2002 | Drops of Jupiter (Tell Me) | Best Instrumental Arrangement Accompanying Vocalist(s) | Won
- 2002 | Drops of Jupiter (Tell Me) | Record of the Year | Nominated
- 2002 | Drops of Jupiter (Tell Me) | Song of the Year | Nominated
- 2002 | Drops of Jupiter (Tell Me) | Best Rock Performance by a Duo or Group with Vocal | Nominated

== Publications ==
- Williams, LG, The Book of Charlie (PCP Press, 2016) ISBN 154076138X
