= AM Gold (album) =

Studio album by Train
- Released: May 20, 2022
- Recorded: 2019–2022
- Length: 38:50
- Label: Columbia
- Producer: Jerry Becker; Matt Musty; Butch Walker

Train chronology
Greatest Hits (2018)	AM Gold (2022)	Mad Dog in the Fog (2026)

Singles from AM Gold
- 1. "AM Gold" Released: February 16, 2022; 2. "Cleopatra" Released: May 31, 2022

AM Gold is the eleventh studio album by American pop rock band Train, released on May 20, 2022, through Columbia Records. To date, AM Gold is the first Train album of original material not to chart on the Billboard 200 albums chart.

== Background ==
On February 16, 2022, Train released a single called "AM Gold" and announced that an album of the same name would be released on May 20, 2022. They also uploaded a video to their YouTube channel showing Ken Jeong promoting the album. Frontman Pat Monahan says that, regarding the album, "writing songs is hard. It's difficult to create something that you love and then other people love as well. Writing songs for two and a half years in front of video screens instead of being in the presence of other humans has been a long, strange trip. And now here we are. It has to start with love. Love that goes into work comes out of work. We love (the title track), this album, and our fans. Thank you for waiting so long for us. I think it was worth it. AM Gold! Here we go!"

== Promotion ==
Other than the lead single, "AM Gold", the album was preceded by three promotional singles. These songs were "Running Back (Trying to Talk to You)", released on April 14, 2022, "Turn the Radio Up" featuring Jewel, released on May 6, 2022, and "Cleopatra" featuring Sofía Reyes, released on May 18, 2022.

== Critical reception ==
Professional ratings
Review scores
Source	Rating
AllMusic	3.5/5 stars

Stephen Thomas Erlewine of AllMusic gave AM Gold a positive review, stating that "Train makes maximalist pop music, the kind designed to be heard and sold at big-box stores, a sensibility that's rare in 2022, which is why AM Gold delivers a very particular kind of retro good times."

== Tour ==
The band subsequently announced the AM Gold Tour with Jewel and Blues Traveler, with a few select shows with Thunderstorm Artis and Will Anderson. The tour began on June 8, 2022, in Mansfield, Massachusetts.

== Track listing ==
AM Gold track listing
No.	Title	Writer(s)	Length
1.	"AM Gold"	Pat Monahan; Jerry Becker; Matt Musty	2:49
2.	"Running Back (Trying to Talk to You)"	Monahan; Becker; Musty	4:01
3.	"Cleopatra" (featuring Sofía Reyes)	Monahan; Becker; Musty; Sofía Reyes; Thom Bridges	3:20
4.	"Bettin' on Me"	Monahan; Becker; Musty; Reign Tones	3:28
5.	"Fake Flowers"	Monahan; Becker; Musty	4:06
6.	"Turn the Radio Up" (featuring Jewel)	Monahan; Becker; Musty; Irma Thomas; Jordan Blackmon	3:19
7.	"Amber Light"	Monahan; Becker; Musty	3:56
8.	"Easy on the Eyes"	Monahan; Becker; Musty	3:43
9.	"Ain't No Easy Way"	Monahan; Becker; Musty; Catherine Peek; Daniel Peek	3:08
10.	"Singing Alone"	Monahan; Becker; Musty	3:35
11.	"It's Everything"	Monahan; Becker; Musty	3:25
Total length:			38:50

== Personnel ==
Train

- Jerry Becker – rhythm guitar, keyboards
- Nikita Houston – backing vocals
- Taylor Locke – lead guitar
- Hector Maldonado – bass
- Pat Monahan – lead vocals
- Matt Musty – drums
- Sakai Smith – backing vocals

Musicians

- Wayne Bergeron – trumpet (1, 2, 7, 8)
- Charlie Bisharat – violin (4–6, 9)
- Jacob Braun – cello (4–6, 9)
- Zach Dellinger – viola (4–6, 9)
- Andrew Duckles – viola (4–6, 9)
- Bruce Dukov – violin (4–6, 9)
- Steve Erdody – cello (4–6, 9)
- Jessica Guideri – violin (4–6, 9)
- Dan Higgins – baritone saxophone (1, 2, 7, 8), alto saxophone (2, 7, 8)
- Paula Hochhalter – cello (4–6, 9)
- Luanne Homzy – violin (4–6, 9)
- Alex Iles – trombone (1, 2, 7, 8)
- Julia Laws – background vocals (3)
- Natalie Leggett – violin (4–6, 9)
- Maya Magub – violin (4–6, 9)
- Shawn Mann – viola (4–6, 9)
- Eric Marienthal – tenor saxophone (1, 2, 7, 8)
- Rob Mathes – conductor (1, 2, 4–9)
- Rafael Padilla – percussion (1, 3, 7, 8, 10)
- Alyssa Park – violin (4–6, 9)
- Molly Rogers – violin (4–6, 9)
- Rob Schaer – trumpet (1, 2, 7, 8)
- Terez Stanislav – violin (4–6, 9)
- Josefina Vergara – violin (4–6, 9)

Technical

- Tristan Ableson – engineering assistance
- Jeff Balding – mixing
- Jerry Becker – production
- Jordan Blackmon – miscellaneous production (6)
- Thom Bridges – co-production (3)
- Jeff Fitzpatrick – engineering assistance (2, 4–7)
- Lilly Graves – engineering assistance (2, 4–7)
- Chandler Harrod – engineering (2, 4–9)
- Matt Musty – production
- Todd Stopera – engineering
- Butch Walker – production, engineering

== Charts ==
Chart performance for AM Gold
Chart (2022)	Peak position
Scottish Albums (OCC)	43
UK Album Downloads (OCC)	58
