= Mermaids of Alcatraz Tour =

2013 concert tour by Train

- Tour by Train
- Tour's promotional poster
- Associated album: California 37
- Start date: July 11, 2013
- End date: August 14, 2013
- No. of shows: 25 Total

Train concert chronology
- California 37 Tour (2012); Mermaids of Alcatraz Tour (2013); Picasso at the Wheel Tour (2015)

The Mermaids of Alcatraz Tour was a concert tour by American pop-rock band Train. It was in support of the group's sixth studio album, California 37. The tour began on July 11, 2013, in Virginia Beach, Virginia and ended on August 14, 2013, in Auburn, Washington. The tour was presented by the band's Save Me, San Francisco Wine company. Gavin DeGraw, The Script, and Michael Franti and Spearhead have performed as opening acts. Country music singer Ashley Monroe also made appearances during Train's main set.

== Background ==
The tour was first announced on January 31, 2013. The tour was originally going to be additional dates of the California 37 Tour but the next day on February 1, it was announced that the name of the tour had been changed to the Mermaids of Alcatraz Tour because (they thought that would have a better chance to trend on Twitter). More dates of the tour were announced on March 5, 2013.

As part of the promotion, Train asked for concert-goers to dress up as mermaids and invited some to come on-stage for the group's "Mermaid" song.

== Supporting acts ==
- Gavin DeGraw (All shows except for Bristow and Kansas City)
- The Script (July 17 – August 14, except for Kansas City)
- Ashley Monroe – featured singer in Train's main set.
- Michael Franti and Spearhead (July 11–14, 20)

== Setlist ==
1. "Calling All Angels"
2. "50 Ways to Say Goodbye"
3. "If It's Love"
4. "Get to Me"
5. "Meet Virginia"
6. "Feels Good At First"
7. "Save Me, San Francisco"
8. "Marry Me"
9. "Sing Together"
10. "Mermaid"
11. "Bruises" (with Ashley Monroe)
12. "Weed Instead of Roses" (Performed by Ashley Monroe)
13. Medley: "Free" / "We Can Work It Out" / "All You Need Is Love" (The last two are The Beatles covers.)
14. "Hey, Soul Sister"
15. Drum solo
16. "California 37"
17. "Can't Hold Us" (Macklemore & Ryan Lewis cover)
18. "Drive By"

Encore

19. "We Were Made For This"
20. "This'll Be My Year"
21. "Drops of Jupiter (Tell Me)"
22. "The Weight" (with Monroe, Gavin DeGraw and The Script)

== Tour dates ==
Tour dates as posted on Train's web site:

Date	City	Country	Venue
North America
July 11, 2013	Virginia Beach	United States	Farm Bureau Live
July 12, 2013	Bristow	United States	Jiffy Lube Live
July 13, 2013	Darien Center	United States	Darien Lake PAC
July 14, 2013	Toronto	Canada	Molson Amphitheatre
July 17, 2013	Cuyahoga Falls	United States	Blossom Music Center
July 18, 2013	Clarkston	United States	DTE Energy Music Theatre
July 19, 2013	Noblesville	United States	Klipsch Music Center
July 20, 2013	Kansas City	United States	Starlight Theatre
July 21, 2013	Tinley Park	United States	First Midwest Bank Amphitheatre
July 23, 2013	Wantagh	United States	Nikon at Jones Beach Theater
July 24, 2013	Camden	United States	Susquehanna Bank Center
July 27, 2013	Mansfield	United States	Comcast Center
July 28, 2013	Holmdel	United States	PNC Bank Arts Center
July 30, 2013	Charlotte	United States	Verizon Wireless Amphitheatre
July 31, 2013	Atlanta	United States	Aaron's Amphitheatre
August 2, 2013	The Woodlands	United States	Cynthia Woods Mitchell Pavilion
August 3, 2013	Dallas	United States	Gexa Energy Pavilion
August 4, 2013	Austin	United States	Austin360 Amphitheater
August 6, 2013	Albuquerque	United States	Isleta Amphitheater
August 7, 2013	Phoenix	United States	Ak-Chin Pavilion
August 9, 2013	Irvine	United States	Verizon Wireless Amphitheatre
August 10, 2013	Wheatland	United States	Sleep Train Amphitheatre
August 11, 2013	San Francisco	United States	America's Cup Pavilion
August 13, 2013	Ridgefield	United States	Sleep Country Amphitheater
August 14, 2013	Auburn	United States	White River Amphitheater

== Band ==
- Pat Monahan: Lead vocals, saxophone, guitar
- Jimmy Stafford: Lead guitar, mandolin, ukulele, slide guitar, backing vocals
- Scott Underwood: Drums, percussion, keyboards, piano
- Jerry Becker: Rhythm guitar, keyboards, piano, Hammond organ, slide guitar, percussion, backing vocals
- Hector Maldonado: Bass guitar, rhythm guitar, percussion, backing vocals
- Brian Switzer: Trumpet
- Nikita Houston: Backing vocals
