= Bulletproof Picasso =

Studio album by Train
- Released: September 12, 2014
- Recorded: 2013–2014
- Genres: Rock; pop rock
- Length: 43:39
- Label: Columbia
- Producers: Azeem; Espionage; Greg Kurstin; Jake Sinclair; Butch Walker; Whams

Train chronology
| California 37 (2012) | Bulletproof Picasso (2014) | Christmas in Tahoe (2015) |

Singles from Bulletproof Picasso
- 1. "Angel in Blue Jeans" Released: June 9, 2014; 2. "Cadillac, Cadillac" Released: September 29, 2014; 3. "Bulletproof Picasso" Released: January 26, 2015; 4. "Give It All" Released: May 19, 2015

Bulletproof Picasso is the seventh studio album by American rock band Train. The album was released by Columbia Records in Friday-release countries on September 12, 2014, and in the United States on September 16, 2014. It is available on CD, vinyl and as a digital download. It is the band's first album to feature drummer Drew Shoals, replacing founding member Scott Underwood, who departed from the band before it was recorded. It is also the band's first album since 2006's For Me, It's You to feature a full band line up. The producers were Azeem, Espionage, Greg Kurstin, Jake Sinclair, Butch Walker and Whams.

== Background ==
With Bulletproof Picasso, the band set out to achieve goals that would allow them to become a more mainstream band. Guitarist Jimmy Stafford explained that the band had never been "cool" and "hip", something he believed this album would make them, enabling them to feel justified in their desires to play at and sell out Madison Square Garden and even becoming musical guests on an episode of Saturday Night Live. Lead singer Pat Monahan also expressed an intent for a more personal, yet ambitious record, stating that "I've always wanted to emotionally connect with people through the songs, but I also want to get into people's lives with this album" and that he felt that he wanted to create "everything that [he'd] wanted to".

== Recording ==
Lead singer Pat Monahan had started creating material for Train's seventh studio album during the band's Mermaids of Alcatraz Tour, in support of California 37. Monahan stated in a Radio.com interview during the latter stages of the tour, "I'm going to spend the whole fall tightening up what I started and creating everything that I've wanted to. San Francisco, Seattle, New York and Nashville will be the main places I'll write it". Monahan had also stated, in an interview with Jason Tanamor of Zoiks! Online, that due to the ambitions set for the new album, wanting to do their "best work", writing for Bulletproof Picasso was harder than what they had previously written and recorded. The production team on the album were the following: Azeem, Espionage, Greg Kurstin, Jake Sinclair, Butch Walker and Whams.

== Packaging ==
The title of the album, Bulletproof Picasso, while borrowing the name from the album's second track, also serves as a statement about the band's long-running career, representing the band's 20-year career as artists. The phrase Bulletproof Picasso is a reference to Spanish painter, poet and playwright Pablo Picasso, who, while in a different artistic medium to Train, who are musical artists, creates art nonetheless. The phrase means that the band, as artists, are bulletproof, and will continue as artists, dodging every bullet shot at them.

== Promotion ==
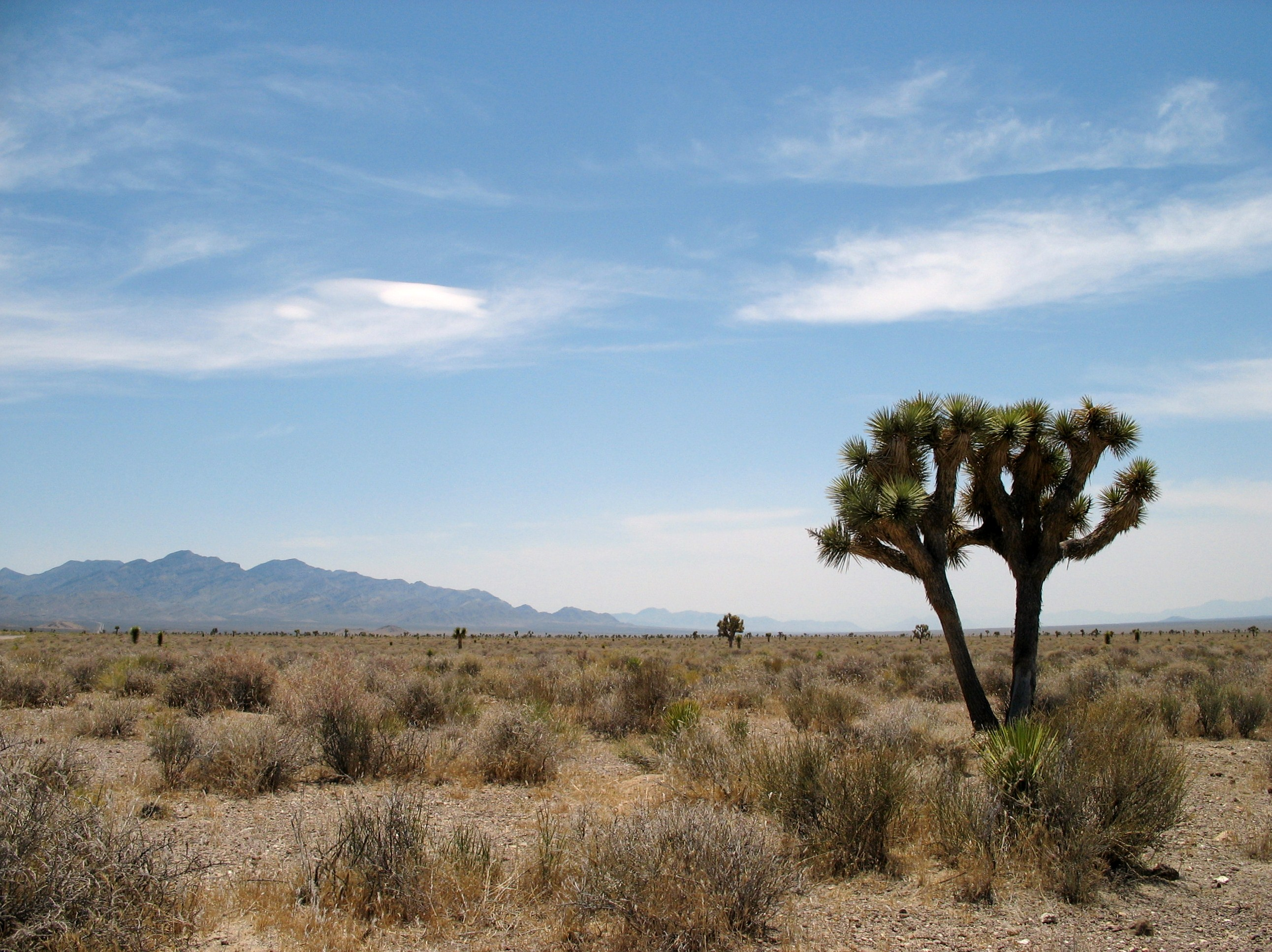
The music video for "Angel in Blue Jeans" was shot in the Mojave Desert. The video was described as a Tarantino-style Spaghetti Western, which complemented the song's western influences; an overall influence in the composition of Bulletproof Picasso as an album.

Bulletproof Picasso was formally unveiled by the band and Columbia Records on June 9, 2014, announced for a September 16, 2014 release date in the United States. "Angel in Blue Jeans" was the first track to be lifted from Bulletproof Picasso. The track was released as a single by Columbia Records on June 9, 2014, serving as the lead single from Bulletproof Picasso. Guitarist Jimmy Stafford originally tweeted a cryptic message on May 5, 2014, a month before the release of "Angel in Blue Jeans", concealing the title of the single in an anagram that read, "sgijannulaebenel". "Angel in Blue Jeans" was also released to Adult contemporary radio and Triple A radio for airplay on June 16.

The album cover and track listing of Bulletproof Picasso was unveiled on July 15, 2014, with preorders for the album on digital download and physical formats starting on the same day. "Angel in Blue Jeans", which appears as the third track on the album, was also released early on the iTunes Store ahead of the full release of Bulletproof Picasso when pre orders for the album started on the store. A music video to accompany the release of "Angel in Blue Jeans" was also released on July 15, coinciding with the commencement of preorders for Bulletproof Picasso. The video, which featured American actor Danny Trejo as his Robert Rodriguez character Machete and Canadian television hostess and actor Hannah Simone, was shot in the Mojave Desert and is staged as a Tarantino-style Spaghetti Western. It also stars lead singer Pat Monahan as the antagonist taking hostage of a woman, played by Simone, who acts as the love interest of Machete, played by Trejo. The video had fetched over a million views by August 1, 2014.

The title track was released to iTunes on July 29, along with the announcement of a sauvignon blanc wine of the same name to be available when the album is released.

A promotional single, "Wonder What You're Doing for the Rest of Your Life", was released on August 25, 2014, preceding the release of Bulletproof Picasso.

"Cadillac Cadillac" was sent to US Hot AC radio stations on September 29, 2014, as the second single off of the album.

"Bulletproof Picasso" was sent to US Hot AC radio stations on January 26, 2015, as the third single off of the album.

"Give It All" was sent to US Hot AC radio stations on May 19, 2015, as the fourth single off of the album.

=== Picasso at the Wheel Tour ===
Train had made numerous performances and appearances on television and radio in the three-month lead up to the release of Bulletproof Picasso. The band had expressed their intent to let fans hear new material on tour before Bulletproof Picasso was released in September, with Jimmy Stafford stating that they were "too excited to not play any other songs off the record", with Stafford being motivated by his opinion that Bulletproof Picasso was the best album the band had ever made. Set lists staged for the band's pre-album performances included "Cadillac, Cadillac", "Bulletproof Picasso", "Angel in Blue Jeans" and "The Bridge"; the most new material the band had played on a single tour. The band, however, while keen to perform new songs, felt uncomfortable at the possibility of throwing off long-time fans during the "limbo period" between the releases of "Angel and Blue Jeans" and Bulletproof Picasso, where fans have not heard the new material. Stafford further explained, "You don't want to put a song no one has heard between "Hey, Soul Sister" and "Meet Virginia" because it feels like a lull in the show. So it's tricky".

The band's promotional media tour started with an appearance on Sirius XM Radio show The Howard Stern Show on June 9, 2014, coinciding with the album's unveiling. The band also premiered "Angel in Blue Jeans" on the show before the track was released as a single the same day. The band also appeared on 94.3 FM The Point on June 11 as part of a radio special entitled "Breakfast with Train", where the band invited fans to ask questions and spend breakfast with them. They performed on the Today Show on June 13, as part of the show's Toyota Summer Concert Series held at Rockefeller Center in New York City. On August 27, they performed at the MLB Fan Cave in New York City.

The Picasso at the Wheel Tour was announced in January 2015, and began on May 21, 2015, in Wheatland, California.

Opening acts

- The Magic Numbers and Natasha North (Europe)
- The Fray and Matt Nathanson (North America)

Tour dates

List of concerts, showing date, city, country, venue, attendance, and gross revenue
| Date | City | Country | Venue | Attendance | Gross revenue |
Europe
| March 24, 2015 | London | England | | 6,588 / 9,706 | $290,085 |
North America
| May 21, 2015 | Wheatland | United States | Toyota Amphitheatre | —N/a | —N/a |
| May 22, 2015 | Mountain View | United States | Shoreline Amphitheatre | —N/a | —N/a |
| May 23, 2015 | Chula Vista | United States | Sleep Train Amphitheatre | —N/a | —N/a |
| May 24, 2015 | Los Angeles | United States | Hollywood Bowl | —N/a | —N/a |
| May 26, 2015 | Phoenix | United States | Ak-Chin Pavilion | —N/a | —N/a |
| May 27, 2015 | Albuquerque | United States | Isleta Amphitheater | —N/a | —N/a |
| May 29, 2015 | Dallas | United States | Gexa Energy Pavilion | —N/a | —N/a |
| May 30, 2015 | The Woodlands | United States | Cynthia Woods Mitchell Pavilion | —N/a | —N/a |
| June 3, 2015 | Pelham | United States | Oak Mountain Amphitheatre | —N/a | —N/a |
| June 5, 2015 | Atlanta | United States | Aaron's Amphitheatre | —N/a | —N/a |
| June 6, 2015 | Tampa | United States | MidFlorida Credit Union Amphitheatre | —N/a | —N/a |
| June 7, 2015 | West Palm Beach | United States | Coral Sky Amphitheatre | —N/a | —N/a |
| June 9, 2015 | Charlotte | United States | PNC Music Pavilion | —N/a | —N/a |
| June 10, 2015 | Raleigh | United States | Walnut Creek Amphitheatre | —N/a | —N/a |
| June 11, 2015 | Hershey | United States | Hersheypark Stadium | —N/a | —N/a |
| June 13, 2015 | Virginia Beach | United States | Farm Bureau Live | —N/a | —N/a |
| June 14, 2015 | Camden | United States | Susquehanna Bank Center | —N/a | —N/a |
| June 16, 2015 | Wantagh, New York | United States | Nikon at Jones Beach Theater | —N/a | —N/a |
| June 18, 2015 | Bangor | United States | Darling's Waterfront Pavilion | —N/a | —N/a |
| June 19, 2015 | Saratoga Springs | United States | Saratoga Performing Arts Center | —N/a | —N/a |
| June 20, 2015 | Mansfield | United States | Xfinity Center | —N/a | —N/a |
| June 21, 2015 | Uncasville | United States | Mohegan Sun Arena | 6,033 / 7,151 | $435,885 |
| June 23, 2015 | Toronto | Canada | Molson Canadian Amphitheatre | —N/a | —N/a |
| June 24, 2015 | Darien Center | United States | Darein Lake PAC | —N/a | —N/a |
| June 26, 2015 | Bethel | United States | Bethel Woods Center for the Arts | —N/a | —N/a |
| June 27, 2015 | Holmdel | United States | PNC Bank Arts Center | —N/a | —N/a |
| June 28, 2015 | Bristow | United States | Jiffy Lube Live | —N/a | —N/a |
| June 30, 2015 | Burgettstown | United States | First Niagara Pavilion | —N/a | —N/a |
| July 1, 2015 | Clarkston | United States | DTE Energy Music Theatre | 14,637 / 14,637 | $497,359 |
| July 2, 2015 | Cincinnati | United States | Riverbend Music Center | —N/a | —N/a |
| July 3, 2015 | Tinley Park | United States | Hollywood Casino Amphitheatre | —N/a | —N/a |
| July 10, 2015 | Nashville | United States | Bridgestone Arena | 9,773 / 11,866 | $334,947 |
| July 11, 2015 | Maryland Heights | United States | Hollywood Casino Amphitheatre | —N/a | —N/a |
| July 12, 2015 | Noblesville | United States | Klipsch Music Center | —N/a | —N/a |
| July 15, 2015 | Cuyahoga Falls | United States | Blossom Music Center | —N/a | —N/a |
| July 17, 2015 | Kansas City | United States | Starlight Theatre | —N/a | —N/a |
| July 18, 2015 | Englewood | United States | Fiddler's Green Amphitheatre | —N/a | —N/a |
| July 19, 2015 | West Valley City | United States | USANA Amphitheatre | —N/a | —N/a |
| July 21, 2015 | Stateline | United States | Harveys Outdoor Arena | 5,694 / 6,500 | $371,262 |
| July 22, 2015 | Boise | United States | Taco Bell Arena | —N/a | —N/a |
| July 24, 2015 | Ridgefield | United States | Amphitheater Northwest | —N/a | —N/a |
| July 25, 2015 | George | United States | The Gorge | —N/a | —N/a |

== Reception ==
Professional ratings
Review scores
| Source | Rating |
|---|---|
| AllMusic | 3/5 stars |
| Billboard | 4/5 stars |
| USA Today | 3/4 stars |

=== Critical ===
Writing for USA Today, Elysa Gardner says "The best tracks on Train's latest album are the driving and high-spirited ones, where Pat Monahan's sweet, keening tenor... evocative here of a Wings-era Paul McCartney... rides meaty but crisply percussive arrangements." Richard Bienstock for Billboard writes how "the Bay Area rock band buffed out the rootsier and rockier aspects of its sound for a more pop-centric approach" that's another "extension of its bid for mainstream glory."

=== Commercial ===
The album debuted at No. 5 on the Billboard 200 albums chart on its first week of release, selling 50,000 copies in the United States in its first week. As of June 2016, the album has sold 145,000 copies in the US. The album also debuted at No. 7 on the Canadian Albums chart.

== Artwork ==
The album art features a burning Cadillac (in reference to the album's single "Cadillac, Cadillac") with a licence plate that reads "PICASSO". This album art was cited among Billboard's worst album covers of 2014.

== Track listing ==
Bulletproof Picasso
| No. | Title | Writer(s) | Producer(s) | Length |
|---|---|---|---|---|
| 1. | "Cadillac, Cadillac" | Pat Monahan, Al Anderson, Butch Walker | Walker, Jake Sinclair^{[a]} | 3:23 |
| 2. | "Bulletproof Picasso" | Monahan, Walker, Trent Mazur, Michael Freesh | Walker, Whams^{[a]} | 3:53 |
| 3. | "Angel in Blue Jeans" | Monahan, Espen Lind, Amund Bjørklund | Walker, Espionage, Sinclair^{[a]}, Ayb Asmar^{[a]} | 3:25 |
| 4. | "Give It All" | Monahan, Amir Salem | Azeem, Sinclair | 3:44 |
| 5. | "Wonder What You're Doing for the Rest of Your Life" (featuring Marsha Ambrosius) | Monahan, Jerry Becker, Walker | Walker, Sinclair^{[a]} | 3:23 |
| 6. | "Son of a Prison Guard" | Monahan, Becker | Walker, Sinclair^{[a]} | 3:39 |
| 7. | "Just a Memory" | Monahan, Lind, Bjørklund, Naomi Neville | Espionage, Sinclair | 3:48 |
| 8. | "I'm Drinkin' Tonight" | Monahan, Matraca Berg, Becker | Walker | 3:35 |
| 9. | "I Will Remember" | Monahan, Walker | Walker | 3:13 |
| 10. | "The Bridge" | Monahan, Greg Kurstin, Walker | Kurstin | 4:29 |
| 11. | "Baby, Happy Birthday" | Monahan, Eg White | Walker, White^{[b]} | 3:43 |
| 12. | "Don't Grow Up So Fast" | Monahan, Tom Douglas | Walker | 3:23 |

Live in San Francisco – bonus disc
| No. | Title | Writer(s) | Length |
|---|---|---|---|
| 1. | "Drive By" | Monahan, Lind, Bjørklund |
| 2. | "Calling All Angels" | Monahan, Charlie Colin, Jimmy Stafford, Scott Underwood |
| 3. | "Save Me, San Francisco" | Monahan, Sam Hollander, Dave Katz |
| 4. | "Hey, Soul Sister" | Monahan, Lind, Bjørklund |
| 5. | "Drops of Jupiter" | Monahan, Colin, Rob Hotchkiss, Stafford, Underwood |
| Total length: | | | 24:17 |

Notes

- "Just a Memory" contains excerpts from "Pain in My Heart", as performed by Otis Redding and written by Naomi Neville.
- ^{^[a]} signifies an additional producer
- ^{^[b]} signifies a vocal producer

== Personnel ==
Train

- Pat Monahan – lead vocals, acoustic guitar
- Jimmy Stafford – guitar
- Jerry Becker – keyboards, guitar
- Hector Maldonado – bass guitar
- Drew Shoals – drums
- Sakai – background vocals
- Nikita Houston – background vocals

Additional Musicians

- Aaron Zuckerman
- Amor Salem
- Butch Walker
- Espen Lind
- Greg Kurstin
- Jake Sinclair
- Larry Goetz
- Mark Stepro
- Noah Gersh
- Rob Mathes – strings and horns

== Charts ==
| Chart (2014) | Peak position |
|---|---|
| Australian Albums (ARIA) | 15 |
| Austrian Albums (Ö3 Austria) | 44 |
| Belgian Albums (Ultratop Flanders) | 141 |
| Belgian Albums (Ultratop Wallonia) | 144 |
| Canadian Albums (Billboard) | 7 |
| Danish Albums (Hitlisten) | 32 |
| Dutch Albums (Album Top 100) | 18 |
| German Albums (Offizielle Top 100) | 46 |
| Irish Albums (IRMA) | 43 |
| Italian Albums (FIMI) | 44 |
| New Zealand Albums (RMNZ) | 32 |
| Scottish Albums (Official Charts) | 6 |
| Swiss Albums (Schweizer Hitparade) | 15 |
| UK Albums (Official Charts) | 9 |
| US Billboard 200 | 5 |
| US Indie Store Album Sales (Billboard) | 20 |

== Release history ==
| Region | Date | Format | Label | Catalog no. |
|---|---|---|---|---|
| Germany | September 12, 2014 | Digital download | Columbia Records | none |
| Australia | September 12, 2014 | Digital download | Columbia Records | none |
| France | September 15, 2014 | Digital download | Columbia Records | none |
| United States | September 16, 2014 | CD; Digital download; Vinyl | Columbia Records | none |
