= These Times (SafetySuit album) =

Studio album by SafetySuit
- Released: January 10, 2012; January 3, 2012 (iTunes exclusive)
- Recorded: 2010–2011
- Genre: Alternative rock; pop rock
- Length: 42:21
- Label: Universal Republic
- Producer: Howard Benson; Espionage; SafetySuit; Ryan Tedder

SafetySuit chronology
Life Left to Go (2008)	These Times (2012)	Hallelujah EP (2012)

Singles from These Times
- 1. "Get Around This" Released: April 19, 2011; 2. "Let Go" Released: September 20, 2011; 3. "These Times" Released: January 3, 2012

These Times is the second studio album by American rock band SafetySuit, released on January 10, 2012, through Universal Republic Records. The album follows their 2008 debut Life Left to Go. It was released exclusively through iTunes on January 3, 2012, before a wide release the following week. These Times was produced by Howard Benson, Ryan Tedder, and Espionage, along with several self-produced songs, departing from their previous work with producer Greg Archilla. The album reached number 7 on the Billboard 200 chart, making it their highest-charting album to date.

== Track listing ==
All lyrics are written by Douglas Brown; all music is composed by Brown, except where noted.

No.	Title	Producer	Length
1.	"Believe"	Howard Benson	4:31
2.	"Get Around This" (Douglas Brown, Amund Bjorklund, Espen Lind)	Espionage	3:32
3.	"Let Go" (Brown, Ryan Tedder)	Tedder; Noel Zancanella	3:20
4.	"Staring at It"	SafetySuit	4:17
5.	"These Times"	Benson	4:12
6.	"Never Stop"	Benson	3:35
7.	"One Time"	Benson	2:57
8.	"Crash"	SafetySuit	2:52
9.	"Stranger"	Benson	3:11
10.	"Things to Say" (Brown, Bjorklund, Lind)	Espionage	3:52
11.	"Life in the Pain"	SafetySuit	5:58
Total length:			42:21

Bonus Track Version
No.	Title	Producer	Length
12.	"You Don't See Me"	SafetySuit	3:39

== Critical reception ==
Professional ratings
Review scores
Source	Rating
AllMusic	3/5 stars
Artistdirect	4.5/5 stars
USA Today	3.5/4 stars

These Times received mostly positive reviews from music critics. Rick Florino of Artistdirect describes the album as "a catchy, captivating, and classy outing from modern rock's finest young outfit" that "is the first must-have album of 2012". Gregory Heaney of AllMusic rated the album three out of five stars and states: "The album finds the band taking a more spacious approach to the genre, surrounding their heartfelt, midtempo jams in a warm blanket of reverb and keyboards, giving them a real sense of depth."

== Charts ==
Chart (2012)	Peak position
Canadian Albums (Billboard)	37
US Billboard 200	7
US Digital Albums (Billboard)	1
US Top Rock Albums (Billboard)	3

== Personnel ==
Credits adapted from AllMusic

=== SafetySuit ===
- Doug Brown – vocals, guitar, keyboards, percussion
- Dave Garofalo – guitar
- Jeremy Henshaw – bass
- Tate Cunningham – drums, keyboards, percussion

=== Additional musicians ===
- Howard Benson – keyboards
- Espen Lind – Dobro, acoustic guitar, keyboards
- Ryan Tedder – bass, drums, guitar, keyboards, background vocals
- Noel Zancanella – bass, drums, guitar, keyboards

=== Technical ===
- Jon Marius Aareskjold – mixing
- Jerry Beltran – A&R
- Howard Benson – production, programming
- Amund Björklund – engineer
- Doug Brown – engineer, production, programming
- Bruce Carbone – A&R, executive producer
- Smith Carlson – engineer
- Tate Cunningham – engineer, mixing, production, programming
- Paul DeCarli – digital editing, engineer
- Espionage – production
- Chris Gehringer – mastering
- Serban Ghenea – mixing
- John Hanes – mixing
- Hatsukazu "Hatch" Inagaki – engineer
- Rich Isaacson – executive producer
- Espen Lind – engineer, mixing
- Chris Lord-Alge – mixing
- Andres Martinez – design, photography
- Francis Murray – engineer
- Jon Nicholson – drum technician
- Mike Plotnikoff – engineer
- SafetySuit – production
- Phil Seaford – assistant
- Ryan Tedder – engineer, production, programming
- Marc VanGool – guitar technician
- Noel Zancanella – production, programming

== Release history ==
Source: Amazon.com

Region	Date	Format(s)	Label
United States	January 10, 2012	CD; digital download	Universal Republic
