= Bruises (Train song) =

Single by Train featuring Ashley Monroe

from the album California 37
- Released: October 5, 2012
- Genre: Country rock
- Length: 3:52
- Label: Columbia, Sony
- Songwriters: Patrick Monahan, Espen Lind, Amund Bjørklund
- Producers: Espionage, Butch Walker

Train singles chronology
"50 Ways to Say Goodbye" (2012)	"Bruises" (2012)	"This'll Be My Year" (2012)

Music video
- "Bruises" on YouTube

"Bruises" is a song by American pop rock band Train from their sixth studio album, California 37. The song features American country singer Ashley Monroe. It was released as the album's third single on October 5, 2012. "Bruises" was re-recorded with French-Canadian singer Marilou in both English and French for its Canadian single release.

== Development ==
In an interview with Radio.com, Monahan said that he had met Ashley Monroe when she was nineteen, and she wanted to write a song with him, which they eventually did through a contact in Columbia Records. Monahan said that he wrote the song in New York, and it was about running into former high school classmates: "I run into people I went to high school with and realize how much older we are, and how much more we’ve been through and a lot of it isn’t all that fun and it makes us more beautiful if you can see it that way. That song was really easy to write because it is a very true story and Ashley was the perfect girl to sing on it."

== Music video ==
A music video was filmed with Monroe for the U.S. release; it was directed by Alan Ferguson. It premiered on Train's official Vevo account on November 12, 2012. The video was filmed at the Red Rocks Amphitheatre at Red Rocks Park in Colorado.

== Live performances ==
A live recording of the song with Megan Slankard is featured on the California 37 deluxe edition DVD. During the group's June 2012 show at the Sydney Opera House, Train were joined by Australian singer Delta Goodrem on the song.

On February 1, 2013, Train and Ashley Monroe performed the song on VH1's 2013 Best Super Bowl Concert Ever. They performed the song during the Mermaids of Alcatraz Tour that run that summer, and on The Today Show on July 26.

== Track listing ==
- Digital download (United States)
1. "Bruises" (featuring Ashley Monroe) – 3:52
- Digital download (Canada)
1. "Bruises" (featuring Marilou) – 3:50
2. "Bruises" (French version) (featuring Marilou) – 3:50

== Charts ==
As of October 2013, the song has sold 463,000 digital copies in the United States.

Weekly chart performance for "Bruises"
Chart (2012–2013)	Peak position
Canada Hot 100 (Billboard)	59
Canada AC (Billboard)	18
Canada CHR/Top 40 (Billboard)	46
Canada Hot AC (Billboard)	47
Italian Airplay (EarOne)	86
Netherlands (Dutch Top 40)	30
US Billboard Hot 100	79
US Hot Country Songs (Billboard)	23
US Country Airplay (Billboard)	44
US Adult Contemporary (Billboard)	16
US Adult Pop Airplay (Billboard)	11

=== Year-end charts ===
2013 year-end chart performance for "Bruises"
Chart (2013)	Position
US Adult Contemporary (Billboard)	50
US Adult Top 40 (Billboard)	38
US Hot Country Songs (Billboard)	72

== Certifications ==
Certifications and sales for "Bruises"
Region	Certification	Certified units/sales
Canada (Music Canada)	Gold	40,000^{*}
United States (RIAA)	Platinum	1,000,000^{‡}
^{*} Sales figures based on certification alone.^{‡} Sales+streaming figures based on certification alone.

== Release history ==
Release dates for "Bruises"
Country	Date	Format	Label
Italy	October 5, 2012	Contemporary hit radio	Sony Music
United Kingdom	October 22, 2012	Contemporary hit radio	Columbia Records, Sony Music
United States	November 9, 2012	Contemporary hit radio	Columbia Records, Sony Music
Canada	December 4, 2012	Digital download	Columbia Records, Sony Music
United States	January 22, 2013	Country radio	Columbia Records, Crush Records, Nine North Records
