= California 37 (album) =

Studio album by Train
- Released: April 13, 2012
- Recorded: 2010–12
- Genres: Rock; pop rock; folk rock; roots rock
- Length: 39:51
- Label: Columbia
- Producers: Espionage; David Hodges; Diji Parq; Butch Walker; Gregg Wattenberg

Train chronology
Save Me, San Francisco (2009)	California 37 (2012)	Bulletproof Picasso (2014)

Singles from California 37
- 1. "Drive By" Released: January 10, 2012; 2. "50 Ways to Say Goodbye" Released: June 11, 2012; 3. "Bruises" Released: October 5, 2012; 4. "This'll Be My Year" Released: November 29, 2012 (Australia); 5. "Mermaid" Released: December 27, 2012

California 37 is the sixth studio album from California rock band Train. The album was released in Friday-release countries on April 13, 2012, and in the United States on April 17, 2012, through Columbia Records. It is the last Train album to feature drummer Scott Underwood before his departure in 2014 and the last recorded as a three-piece. It was preceded by the lead single "Drive By" on January 10, 2012.

== Background ==
Train recorded the album in San Francisco and Los Angeles with Butch Walker and Espionage, and Monahan says that a majority of the writing happened while the group was touring Save Me, San Francisco. "I didn't spend 3 months or 5 months writing, I just wrote throughout the course of the last 3 years," said Monahan. "We have 13 songs that we've recorded and I want to hear every single one of them over and over again."

== Recording ==
California 37 was recorded in various locations across North America. Recording sessions for the band's sixth studio album took place at the Tiny Telephone and Hyde Street Studios in San Francisco and at Ruby Red Studios located in Los Angeles. Additional recording and production for the album also took place at the Bear Creek Studios in Woodinville, Washington, and at the Avast! Recording Studios in Seattle, Washington. Other studios used by the band for recording on California 37 include Integrated Studios, Flux Studios, MSR Studios and Peaceful Waters Music, all located in New York City, and at the Quayside Studios in Newcastle, England.

== Album title and cover ==
The album is named after California State Route 37, a state highway in the North San Francisco Bay Area in northern California. The album's cover is a picture of a 1961 Cadillac on a barren road with the highway shield of California State Route 37 in the foreground, and a shadow overlay of the band's crown logo used on every album since their debut.

== Critical reception ==
Professional ratings
Aggregate scores
Source	Rating
Metacritic	53/100
Review scores
Source	Rating
AllMusic	2.5/5 stars
Billboard	75/100
Goldmine	5/5 stars
Jam!	3/5 stars
Melodic.net	3.5/5 stars
The Michigan Daily	3.5/5 stars
Rolling Stone	3/5 stars
Sputnikmusic	1/5 stars
USA Today	2.5/4 stars
The Washington Times	2.5/4 stars

California 37 received generally mixed reviews from music critics upon its release. At Metacritic, which assigns a normalised rating out of 100 to reviews from mainstream critics, the album received an average score of 53 based on 6 reviews, which indicates "mixed or average reviews". Both the BBC and The New York Times gave the album mixed reviews. On the other hand, the Northwest Herald and Billboard gave the album a positive review. USA Today journalist Brian Mansfield appreciated California 37 for having "its heart in the right place", despite certain awkward moments, particularly the references to older pop songs. He felt that "at its best, California 37's emphatic bursts of melody are buoyant and life affirming".

== Commercial performance ==
The album debuted at number 10 on the UK Albums Chart in the United Kingdom, selling 7,809 copies. It is their highest-charting album there since Drops of Jupiter which peaked at number eight in 2001. In the United States, California 37 debuted at number four on the Billboard 200 with first-week sales of 76,000 copies. It is their fourth top 10 album and their highest-charting album in the US. As of September 2012, California 37 has sold 254,000 copies.

On June 25, Train is re-issuing the album as California 37: Mermaids of Alcatraz Tour Edition. It will have three additional studio recordings on it: "Futon", "To Be Loved" and a cover of John Lennon's "Imagine". The album will also have 3 live songs off of California 37 taken from the band's 2012 San Francisco Tour: "Drive By (Live from San Francisco)", "This'll Be My Year (Live from San Francisco)", and "When The Fog Rolls In (Live from San Francisco)".

== Singles ==
"Drive By" was released as the album's lead single on January 10, 2012. It was commercially successful, peaking at number 10 on the Billboard Hot 100—giving the band their third top ten hit on the chart—and at number 2 on the Billboard Adult Top 40. It also reached the top ten in several other countries, including Austria, Denmark, Germany, the Netherlands, Sweden, Switzerland, and the United Kingdom. The single was later certified three times platinum by Music Canada and the Recording Industry Association of America, two times platinum by the Australian Recording Industry Association, The song's music video, directed by Alan Ferguson and shot at Shafer Vineyards, premiered on VH1 on February 14, 2012. "Feels Good at First" was released digitally on March 26 in the week preceding the album's release. "50 Ways to Say Goodbye" was released to adult contemporary radio in the United States as the album's second official single on June 11, with a release to mainstream radio following on July 31. The single peaked at numbers 20 and 4 respectively on the Billboard Hot 100 and the Adult Top 40.

"Bruises", featuring American country singer Ashley Monroe, was released as the third single from California 37 on October 5, 2012. The song was re-recorded in both English and French with singer Marilou for its Canadian single release, while the original version was released to country radio and peaked at number 79 on the Hot 100. On November 28, Train announced that "This'll Be My Year" would be released as the album's fourth single in Australia. The following day, it officially impacted radio in the country. "Mermaid" was released to American adult contemporary radio as the album's fifth overall and final single on December 27.

== Track listing ==
No.	Title	Writer(s)	Producer(s)	Length
1.	"This'll Be My Year"	Pat Monahan, Butch Walker, Sam Hollander, Dave Katz	Butch Walker	3:30
2.	"Drive By"	Monahan, Espen Lind, Amund Bjørklund	Espionage, Butch Walker (add.)	3:21
3.	"Feels Good at First"	Monahan, Allen Shamblin	Butch Walker	3:02
4.	"Bruises" (featuring Ashley Monroe)	Monahan, Lind, Bjørklund	Espionage, Butch Walker (add.)	3:52
5.	"50 Ways to Say Goodbye"	Monahan, Lind, Bjørklund	Espionage, Butch Walker (add.)	4:08
6.	"You Can Finally Meet My Mom"	Monahan, Jerry Becker	Butch Walker	4:40
7.	"Sing Together"	Monahan, Lind, Bjørklund	Espionage, Butch Walker (add.)	3:26
8.	"Mermaid"	Monahan, Lind, Bjørklund, Tor Erik Hermansen, Mikkel Eriksen	Espionage, Butch Walker (add.)	3:17
9.	"California 37"	Monahan, Gregg Wattenberg, Diji Parq	Butch Walker, Gregg Wattenberg, Diji Parq	2:13
10.	"We Were Made for This"	Monahan, Walker	Butch Walker	4:04
11.	"When the Fog Rolls In"	Monahan, Wattenberg	Butch Walker	4:22

US iTunes and European editions bonus track
No.	Title	Writer(s)	Producer(s)	Length
12.	"To Be Loved"	Monahan, David Hodges	David Hodges	3:41
Total length:				43:42

Deluxe edition bonus tracks
No.	Title	Writer(s)	Producer(s)	Length
12.	"To Be Loved"	Monahan, Hodges	David Hodges	3:41
13.	"This'll Be My Year" (live from San Francisco)	Monahan, Walker, Hollander, Katz		3:38
14.	"Save Me, San Francisco" (live from San Francisco)	Monahan, Hollander, Katz		4:46
15.	"Drops of Jupiter" (live from San Francisco)	Monahan, Charlie Colin, Jimmy Stafford, Rob Hotchkiss, Scott Underwood		5:18
Total length:				57:24

Deluxe edition DVD
No.	Title	Length
1.	"50 Ways to Say Goodbye" (music video)	4:45
2.	"Drive By" (music video)	3:42
3.	"50 Ways to Say Goodbye" (behind the scenes)	3:29
4.	"Drive By" (behind the scenes)	3:13
5.	"Drive By" (live from San Francisco)	4:02
6.	"Bruises" (live from San Francisco; featuring Megan Slankard)	3:50
7.	"Hey, Soul Sister" (live from San Francisco)	4:22
Total length:		27:23

Mermaids of Alcatraz Tour edition bonus tracks
No.	Title	Writer(s)	Producer(s)	Length
12.	"Imagine"	John Lennon		3:08
13.	"To Be Loved"	Monahan, Hodges	David Hodges	3:41
14.	"Futon"	Monahan, Lind, Bjørklund		4:17
15.	"Drive By" (live from San Francisco)	Monahan, Lind, Bjørklund		4:13
16.	"This'll Be My Year" (live from San Francisco)	Monahan, Walker, Hollander, Katz		3:38
17.	"When the Fog Rolls In" (live from San Francisco)	Monahan, Wattenberg		4:03
Total length:				62:51

== Personnel ==
Credits for California 37 adapted from AllMusic.

Train

- Pat Monahan – vocals, songwriting
- Jimmy Stafford – guitar
- Scott Underwood – drums

Additional Personnel

- Jerry Becker – keyboards, songwriting
- Amund Bjørklund – producer, programming
- Eva Burmeister – violin
- Karen Dreyfus – viola
- Mark Endert – mixing
- George Flynn – bass trombone, tuba
- Katherine Fong – violin
- Quan Ge – violin
- Aaron Heick – alto sax, oboe
- David Hodges – songwriting, production
- Sam Hollander – songwriting
- Birch Johnson – trombone
- Vivek Kamath – viola
- Dave Katz – songwriting
- Shmuel Katz – viola
- Jeff Kievit – trumpet
- Lisa Kim – violin, concertmaster
- Krzysztof Kuznik – violin
- Hyunju Lee – violin
- Kuan Cheng Lu – violin
- Espen Lind – producer, bass, guitar, keyboards, background vocals, programming, Weissenborn, string arrangement, ukulele, harmonium
- Brad Magers – horns
- Hector Maldonado – bass
- Jorgen Malo – orchestration
- Ashley Monroe – vocals
- Kurt Muroki – bass
- Jooyoung Oh – violin
- Suzanne Ornstein – violin
- Diji Parq – songwriting, production
- John Patitucci – bass
- Anna Rabinova – violin
- Tim Ries – tenor sax, clarinet
- Robert Rinehart – viola
- Roger Rosenberg – baritone sax, bassoon
- Allen Shamblin – songwriting
- Jake Sinclair – programming
- Lenny Skolnik – programming
- Mina Smith – cello
- Alan Stepansky – cello
- Jenny Strenger – violin
- Kathryn Tickell –Northumbrian pipes
- Butch Walker – songwriting, production
- Gregg Wattenberg – songwriting, production
- The West Los Angeles Children's Choir – vocals
- Mary Wooten – cello
- Sharon Yamanda – violin
- Wei Yu – cello

== Charts ==
=== Weekly charts ===
Weekly chart performance for California 37
Chart (2012)	Peak position
Australian Albums Chart	9
Austrian Albums Chart	22
Belgium Albums Chart (Flanders)	103
Belgium Albums Chart (Wallonia)	181
Canadian Albums Chart	6
Danish Albums Chart	27
Dutch Albums Chart	16
French Albums Chart	114
German Albums Chart	25
Irish Albums Chart	74
Italian Albums Chart	39
New Zealand Albums Chart	17
Scottish Albums Chart	3
Swiss Albums Chart	14
UK Albums Chart	7
US Billboard 200	4
US Billboard Rock Albums	2

=== Year-end charts ===
Year-end chart performance for California 37
Chart (2012)	Position
Australian Albums Chart	60
UK Albums Chart	63
US Billboard 200	82
US Billboard Rock Albums	24

== Certifications ==
Certifications and sales for California 37
Region	Certification	Certified units/sales
Australia (ARIA)	Gold	35,000^{^}
Sweden (GLF)	Gold	20,000^{‡}
United Kingdom (BPI)	Platinum	300,000^{‡}
United States (RIAA)	Platinum	1,000,000^{‡}
^{^} Shipments figures based on certification alone.^{‡} Sales+streaming figures based on certification alone.

== Release history ==
Release dates for California 37
Country	Date	Edition	Format	Label
Australia	April 13, 2012	Standard	CD	Columbia Records, Sony Music
Germany	April 13, 2012	Standard	CD, digital download	Columbia Records, Sony Music
Ireland	April 13, 2012	Standard	Digital download	Columbia Records, Sony Music
United Kingdom	April 15, 2012	Standard	Digital download	Columbia Records, Sony Music
Australia	April 16, 2012	Standard	Digital download	Columbia Records, Sony Music
United Kingdom	April 16, 2012	Standard	CD	Columbia Records, Sony Music
Ireland	April 17, 2012	Standard	CD	Columbia Records, Sony Music
United States	April 17, 2012	Standard	CD, digital download	Columbia Records, Sony Music
United Kingdom	May 8, 2012	Standard	LP	Columbia Records, Sony Music
United States	May 8, 2012	Standard	LP	Columbia Records, Sony Music
Germany	November 30, 2012	Deluxe	CD	Columbia Records, Sony Music
United Kingdom	December 3, 2012	Deluxe	CD	Columbia Records, Sony Music
United States	June 25, 2013	Tour	CD	Columbia Records, Sony Music
