= Angel in Blue Jeans =

Single by Train

from the album Bulletproof Picasso
- Released: June 9, 2014
- Recorded: 2013−14
- Genre: Folk pop
- Length: 3:25
- Label: Columbia
- Songwriters: Pat Monahan, Amund Bjørklund, Espen Lind
- Producers: Bjørklund, Lind, Butch Walker

Train singles chronology
"Mermaid" (2012)	"Angel in Blue Jeans" (2014)	"Cadillac, Cadillac" (2014)

Music video
- "Angel in Blue Jeans" on YouTube

"Angel in Blue Jeans" is a song recorded by American rock band Train for their seventh studio album Bulletproof Picasso. The song was written by Pat Monahan, Amund Bjørklund, and Espen Lind, and was produced by the latter two as well as Butch Walker. It was released on June 9, 2014 as the lead single from the album.

== Music video ==
The music video premiered on July 14, 2014 via the band's YouTube channel, and was officially released through their VEVO account on July 15, 2014. Directed by SCRANTON and Mel Soria, the video stars New Girl actress Hannah Simone as the titular angel, Danny Trejo as a heroic derivative of his Robert Rodriguez character Machete, and Train frontman Pat Monahan as a villainous sheriff. The video is influenced by the Spaghetti Western film genre, and features Trejo lip-synching to the lyrics.

== Charts ==
=== Weekly charts ===
Chart (2014)	Peak position
Austria (Ö3 Austria Top 40)	24
Belgium (Ultratip Bubbling Under Flanders)	10
Canada (Canadian Hot 100) (Billboard)	41
Canada AC (Billboard)	4
Canada Hot AC (Billboard)	16
Germany (GfK)	30
Hungary (Rádiós Top 40)	9
Hungary (Single Top 40)	21
Italian Airplay (EarOne)	51
Netherlands (Single Top 100)	58
Slovenia (SloTop50)	10
Switzerland (Schweizer Hitparade)	38
UK Singles (Official Charts)	58
US Billboard Hot 100	79
US Adult Alternative Songs (Billboard)	12
US Adult Contemporary (Billboard)	13
US Adult Top 40 (Billboard)	8

=== Year-end charts ===
Chart (2014)	Position
Hungary (Rádiós Top 40)	69
US Adult Alternative Songs (Billboard)	39
US Adult Contemporary (Billboard)	31
US Adult Top 40 (Billboard)	32

== Certifications ==
Region	Certification	Certified units/sales
United States (RIAA)	Gold	500,000^{‡}
^{‡} Sales+streaming figures based on certification alone.
