= She's on Fire (Train song) =

"She's On Fire"

Single by Train

from the album Drops of Jupiter
- Released: February 18, 2002
- Recorded: 2001
- Genre: Rock
- Length: 3:49 (album version); 3:53 (radio version)
- Label: Columbia
- Songwriter: Train
- Producer: Brendan O'Brien

Train singles chronology
"Something More" (2001)	"She's On Fire" (2002)	"Calling All Angels" (2003)

Alternative cover
- DVD single cover

Music video
- "Train - She's On Fire" on YouTube

"She's On Fire" is the third and final single from Train's second album, Drops of Jupiter (2001).

== Track listing ==
2002 Australian single

1. "She's on Fire" (radio version)
2. "Drops of Jupiter (Tell Me)" (live)
3. "Meet Virginia" (live)
4. "Ramble On" (acoustic)

2002 European single

1. "She's on Fire" (radio version)
2. "Drops of Jupiter (Tell Me)" (live)
3. "Meet Virginia" (live)
4. "She's on Fire" (video)

DVD single

1. "She's on Fire" (Music video)
2. "Meet Virginia" (Music video)
3. "Drops of Jupiter (Tell Me)" (Live music video from The Warfield)

== Charts ==
Chart (2002)	Peak position
Australian Singles Chart	57
Netherlands (Single Top 100)	88
UK Singles (Official Charts)	49
US Billboard Adult Top 40	21
US Billboard Mainstream Rock Tracks	40

== In popular culture ==
The song is featured in The Animal (but not the soundtrack), and the soundtrack of Rugrats Go Wild.
