= She's on Fire =

She's on Fire may refer to:

- "She's on Fire" (Amy Holland song), 1983
- "She's on Fire" (Train song), 2001
- "She's on Fire", a song by Aerosmith from Done with Mirrors
