= 50 Ways to Say Goodbye =

Single by Train

from the album California 37
- B-side: "Brand New Book"
- Released: June 11, 2012
- Genre: Pop rock; folk rock; indie pop
- Length: 4:08
- Label: Columbia; Sony
- Songwriters: Patrick Monahan; Espen Lind; Amund Bjørklund
- Producers: Espionage; Butch Walker

Train singles chronology
"Drive By" (2012)	"50 Ways to Say Goodbye" (2012)	"Bruises" (2012)

Music video
- "50 Ways to Say Goodbye" on YouTube

"50 Ways to Say Goodbye" is a song by American pop rock band Train. It is the second single from their sixth studio album, California 37 and is the fifth track on the album. It is considered to be adult contemporary pop radio music. It was released in the United States on June 11, 2012. It is their most recent Top 40 hit, peaking at number 20 on the Hot 100. It was certified gold by the RIAA on September 20, 2012, and has since been certified triple platinum.

== Composition ==
"50 Ways to Say Goodbye" is a pop rock song in the key of E♭ minor. It is in common time with a tempo of 140 beats per minute. It utilizes electric guitars and a mariachi influenced brass section and acoustic guitar.

Singer Pat Monahan said the song "was just a gag about a girl breaking up with a boy and being just so immature that the only way to handle it was just to tell your friends that she's dead."

The lyrics are a tongue-in-cheek narrative where to save face, the singer claims he will say his girlfriend died in a variety of outlandish ways rather than admit she dumped him. The song had some inspiration from Paul Simon's "50 Ways to Leave Your Lover" and was originally going to be titled "50 Ways to Kill Your Lover". That title was tossed as it could attract controversy.

Although the song is called "50 Ways to Say Goodbye", the song only references 11 unique excuses.

== Critical reception ==
Nick Bassett of The Re-View compared "50 Ways to Say Goodbye" to its predecessor, saying that "whilst it lacks that Summery carefree vibe [of "Drive By"], this newbie is still buoyed by a jaunty radio-friendly chorus".

== Music video ==
The music video was directed by Marc Klasfeld and features David Hasselhoff, Taryn Manning, Jonathan Lipnicki, and a Mariachi trio, in addition to band members Pat Monahan, Jimmy Stafford, and Scott Underwood (Stafford and Underwood have since left the band). The video is set in a supermarket with Monahan explaining to Hasselhoff and various other customers and staff members the absence of his girlfriend. Stafford portrays the store cashier and Underwood plays the butcher, while the girlfriend is played by Manning. The grocery store scenes are interspersed with cutaways to the various excuses Pat makes for his girlfriend's absence, as well as scenes of the band performing onstage. Towards the end of the video, a fan (Lipnicki) holding up signs consoling Pat for the supposed loss of his girlfriend finally holds up a sign that says "Rack City Bitch", a reference to "Rack City" by Tyga. At the end of the video, Pat's girlfriend is revealed to be alive and says hello to him and Hasselhoff, who stand awkwardly as she continues her shopping.

== Track listing ==
- Digital download
1. "50 Ways to Say Goodbye" – 4:08
- CD single
1. "50 Ways to Say Goodbye" – 4:08
2. "Brand New Book" – 3:47

== Credits ==
- Pat Monahan - songwriter, lead vocals
- Espen Lind - songwriter, producer, additional guitars, bass, keyboards, backing vocals, programming
- Amund Bjorklund - songwriter, producer, programming
- Jimmy Stafford - guitar
- Scott Underwood - drums
- Hector Maldonado - bass
- Jerry Becker - keyboards
- Brad Magers - horns

== Charts ==
=== Weekly charts ===
Chart (2012–2013)	Peak position
Australia (ARIA)	16
Belgium (Ultratip Bubbling Under Flanders)	2
Canada Hot 100 (Billboard)	17
Canada CHR/Top 40 (Billboard)	33
Canada Hot AC (Billboard)	8
Czech Republic Airplay (ČNS IFPI)	4
Finland Download (Latauslista)	7
Iceland (Tonlist)	12
Israel International Airplay (Media Forest)	8
Lebanon (Lebanese Top 20)	7
Netherlands (Dutch Top 40)	14
Netherlands (Single Top 100)	22
Scottish Singles Sales (Official Charts)	23
UK Singles (Official Charts)	50
US Billboard Hot 100	20
US Adult Contemporary (Billboard)	11
US Adult Pop Airplay (Billboard)	4
US Hot Rock & Alternative Songs (Billboard)	4
US Pop Airplay (Billboard)	17

=== Year-end charts ===
Chart (2012)	Position
Canada (Canadian Hot 100)	86
Netherlands (Dutch Top 40)	70
Netherlands (Single Top 100)	93
US Billboard Hot 100	81
US Adult Contemporary (Billboard)	49
US Adult Top 40 (Billboard)	18

Chart (2013)	Position
US Adult Contemporary (Billboard)	46

== Certifications ==
Certifications for "50 Ways to Say Goodbye"
Region	Certification	Certified units/sales
Australia (ARIA)	Platinum	70,000^{^}
Canada (Music Canada)	Platinum	80,000^{*}
New Zealand (RMNZ)	Platinum	30,000^{‡}
United Kingdom (BPI)	Silver	200,000^{‡}
United States (RIAA)	3× Platinum	3,000,000^{‡}
^{*} Sales figures based on certification alone.^{^} Shipments figures based on certification alone.^{‡} Sales+streaming figures based on certification alone.

== Release history ==
Country	Date	Format	Label
United States	June 11, 2012	Adult contemporary radio airplay	Columbia Records, Sony Music
United States	July 31, 2012	Mainstream radio airplay	Columbia Records, Sony Music
