= List of Billboard Adult Contemporary number ones of 2012 =

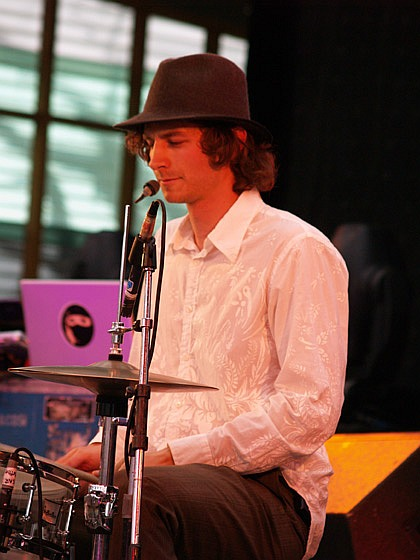
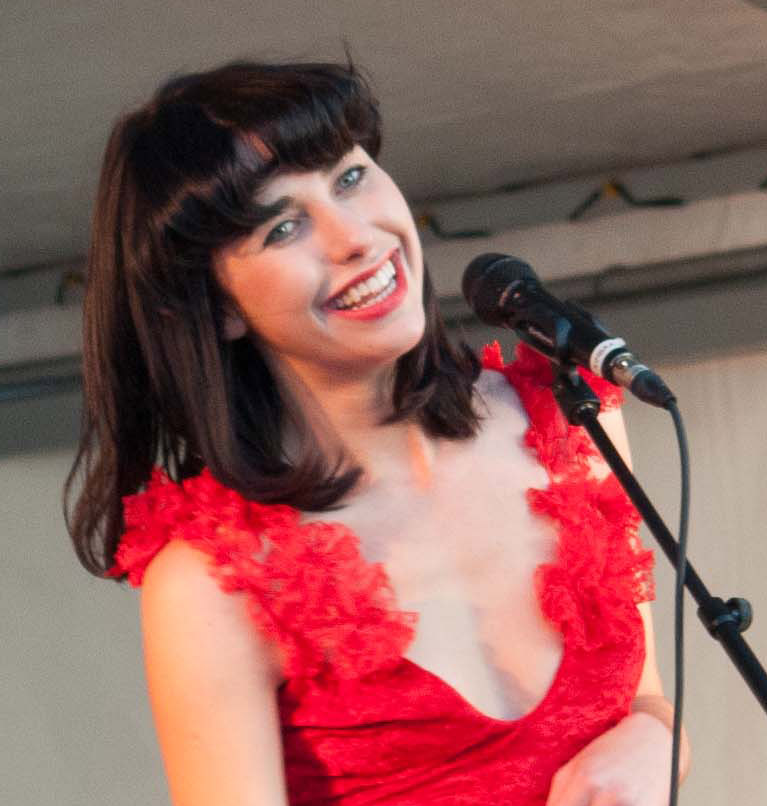
Multi-instrumentalist and producer Gotye (left) and vocalist Kimbra spent 16 weeks at number one with the song "Somebody That I Used to Know".

Adult Contemporary is a chart published by Billboard ranking the top-performing songs in the United States in the adult contemporary music (AC) market. In 2012, nine different songs topped the chart in 52 issues of the magazine, based on weekly airplay data from radio stations compiled by Nielsen Broadcast Data Systems.

On the first chart of the year, the number one position was held by Michael Bublé with "All I Want for Christmas Is You", the song's fifth consecutive week at number one. The following week it was replaced in the top spot by British singer Adele's song "Someone like You", which had first reached number one the previous December and now returned to number one for a further four weeks. Adele would return to the top spot in March with "Set Fire to the Rain", and was the only act to achieve more than one AC number one in 2012. After four weeks, "Set Fire to the Rain" was displaced by "Just a Kiss" by the country music trio Lady Antebellum. The song had reached number one on Billboard's Hot Country Songs chart the previous summer, but was not serviced to adult contemporary radio until August 2011, and subsequently took 24 weeks to reach the top spot on the AC listing.

The longest unbroken run at number one on the Adult Contemporary listing during 2012 was 16 weeks, achieved by "Somebody That I Used to Know" by Belgian-Australian singer-songwriter Gotye and New Zealand singer Kimbra, which reached the top of the chart in August. Although both acts had experienced success in their native countries, the song was the international breakthrough for both. In the United States it was successful across multiple genres, topping a number of Billboard charts, including Alternative Songs and Dance/Mix Show Airplay, as well as reaching number one on the magazine's all-genre chart, the Hot 100. It was replaced at number one on the AC chart in the issue of the magazine dated December 8 by veteran British singer Rod Stewart's recording of the 1945 song "Let It Snow! Let It Snow! Let It Snow!", which went on to be the year's final chart-topper, holding the top spot for the final four weeks of 2012. Stewart's song continued a trend of Christmas-themed songs topping the AC chart at the end of the year, reflecting the fact that adult contemporary radio stations usually switch to playing exclusively festive songs in December.

== Chart history ==
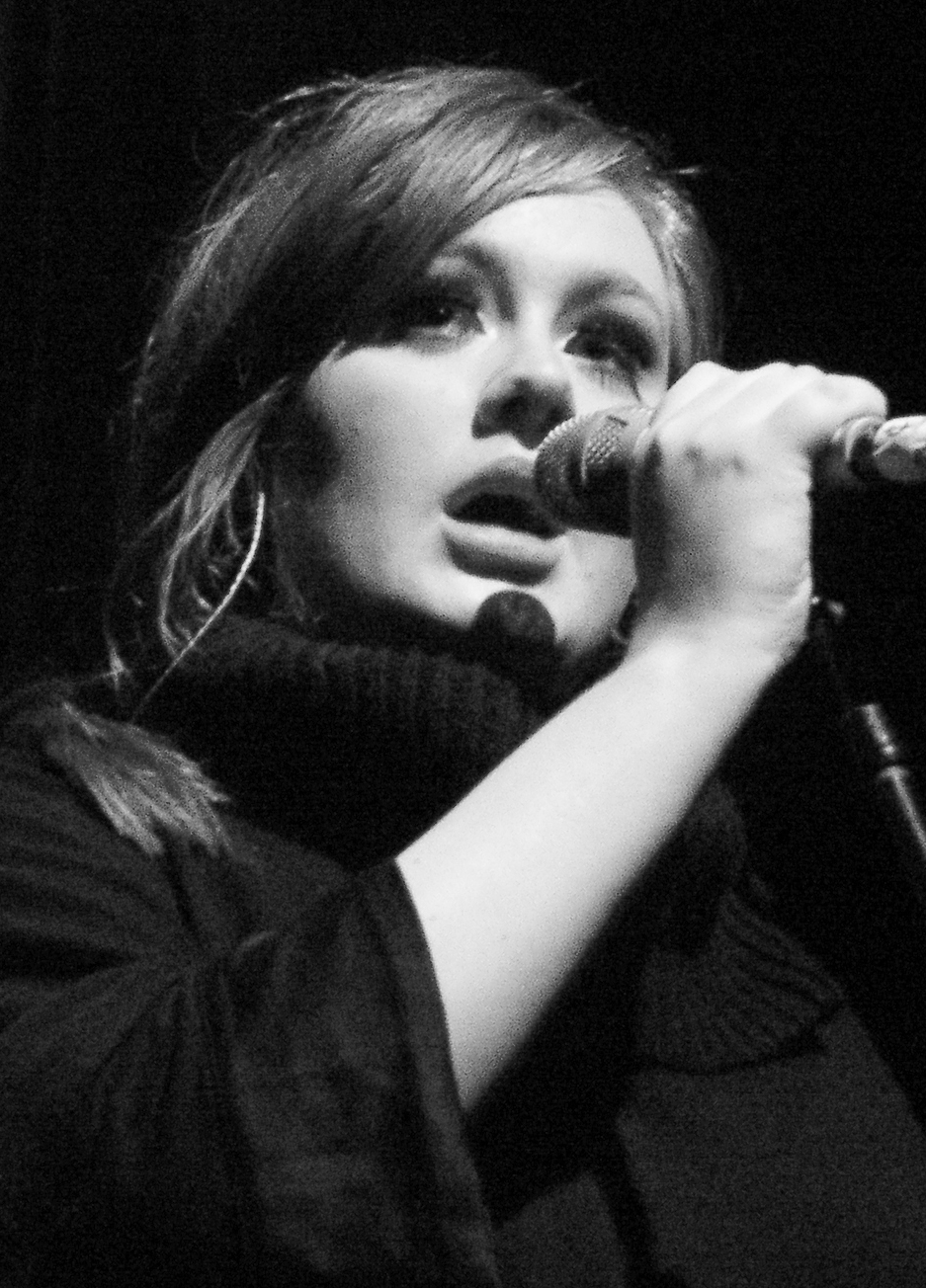
Adele was the only artist to achieve more than one number one in 2012.

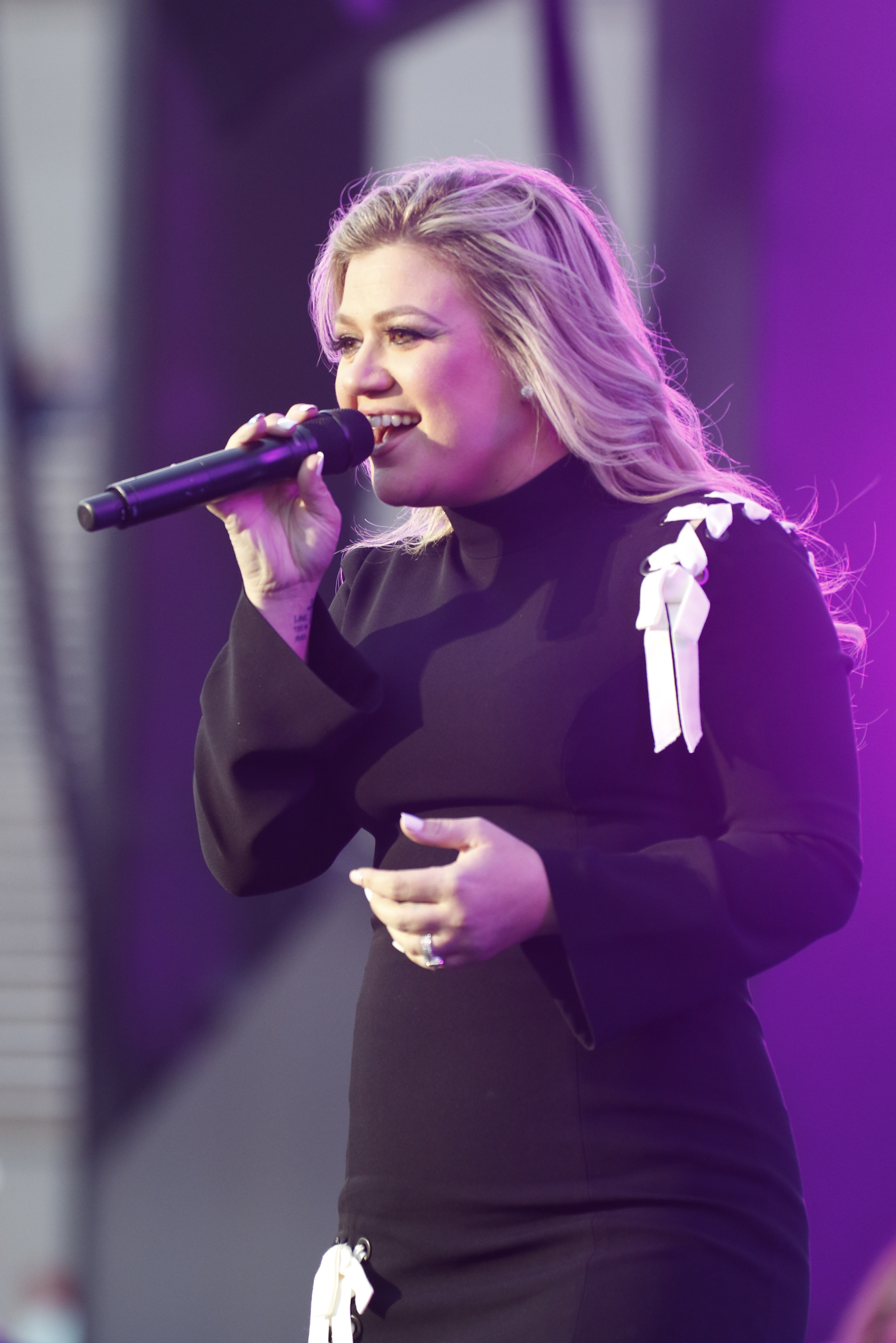
"Stronger (What Doesn't Kill You)" was a chart-topper for Kelly Clarkson.

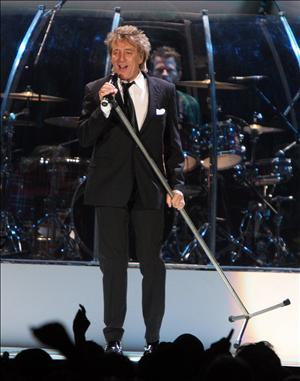
Rock veteran Rod Stewart ended the year at number one.

Key
†	Indicates best-performing AC song of 2012

Issue date	Title	Artist(s)	Ref.
January 7	"All I Want for Christmas Is You"	Michael Bublé	
January 14	"Someone like You"	Adele	
January 21	"Someone like You"	Adele	
January 28	"Someone like You"	Adele	
February 4	"Someone like You"	Adele	
February 11	"Just a Kiss"	Lady Antebellum	
February 18	"Just a Kiss"	Lady Antebellum	
February 25	"Just a Kiss"	Lady Antebellum	
March 3	"Just a Kiss"	Lady Antebellum	
March 10	"Just a Kiss"	Lady Antebellum	
March 17	"Just a Kiss"	Lady Antebellum	
March 24	"Brighter Than the Sun"	Colbie Caillat	
March 31	"Set Fire to the Rain"	Adele	
April 7	"Set Fire to the Rain"	Adele	
April 14	"Set Fire to the Rain"	Adele	
April 21	"Set Fire to the Rain"	Adele	
April 28	"Set Fire to the Rain"	Adele	
May 5	"Set Fire to the Rain"	Adele	
May 12	"Set Fire to the Rain"	Adele	
May 19	"Set Fire to the Rain"	Adele	
May 26	"Set Fire to the Rain"	Adele	
June 2	"Set Fire to the Rain"	Adele	
June 9	"Set Fire to the Rain"	Adele	
June 16	"Stronger (What Doesn't Kill You)" †	Kelly Clarkson	
June 23	"Stronger (What Doesn't Kill You)" †	Kelly Clarkson	
June 30	"Stronger (What Doesn't Kill You)" †	Kelly Clarkson	
July 7	"Stronger (What Doesn't Kill You)" †	Kelly Clarkson	
July 14	"Stronger (What Doesn't Kill You)" †	Kelly Clarkson	
July 21	"Stronger (What Doesn't Kill You)" †	Kelly Clarkson	
July 28	"Stronger (What Doesn't Kill You)" †	Kelly Clarkson	
August 4	"Stronger (What Doesn't Kill You)" †	Kelly Clarkson	
August 11	"Drive By"	Train	
August 18	"Somebody That I Used to Know"	Gotye featuring Kimbra	
August 25	"Somebody That I Used to Know"	Gotye featuring Kimbra	
September 1	"Somebody That I Used to Know"	Gotye featuring Kimbra	
September 8	"Somebody That I Used to Know"	Gotye featuring Kimbra	
September 15	"Somebody That I Used to Know"	Gotye featuring Kimbra	
September 22	"Somebody That I Used to Know"	Gotye featuring Kimbra	
September 29	"Somebody That I Used to Know"	Gotye featuring Kimbra	
October 6	"Somebody That I Used to Know"	Gotye featuring Kimbra	
October 13	"Somebody That I Used to Know"	Gotye featuring Kimbra	
October 20	"Somebody That I Used to Know"	Gotye featuring Kimbra	
October 27	"Somebody That I Used to Know"	Gotye featuring Kimbra	
November 3	"Somebody That I Used to Know"	Gotye featuring Kimbra	
November 10	"Somebody That I Used to Know"	Gotye featuring Kimbra	
November 17	"Somebody That I Used to Know"	Gotye featuring Kimbra	
November 24	"Somebody That I Used to Know"	Gotye featuring Kimbra	
December 1	"Somebody That I Used to Know"	Gotye featuring Kimbra	
December 8	"Let It Snow! Let It Snow! Let It Snow!"	Rod Stewart	
December 15	"Let It Snow! Let It Snow! Let It Snow!"	Rod Stewart	
December 22	"Let It Snow! Let It Snow! Let It Snow!"	Rod Stewart	
December 29	"Let It Snow! Let It Snow! Let It Snow!"	Rod Stewart	

== See also ==
- 2012 in music
- List of artists who reached number one on the U.S. Adult Contemporary chart
