= SafetySuit =

American pop rock band

- Origin: Tulsa, Oklahoma, United States
- Genres: Alternative rock; pop rock
- Years active: 2002–present
- Labels: Universal Motown; Universal Republic
- Members: Douglas Brown; Jeremy Henshaw; Tate Cunningham
- Past members: Jesse Carey; Curtis Lloyd; Dave Garofalo
- Website: safetysuitmusic.com

SafetySuit is an American rock band from Tulsa, Oklahoma, currently based in Nashville, Tennessee. Their 2008 major label debut album Life Left to Go featured songs "Stay" and "Someone Like You", the former first achieving fame by climbing to No. 1 on the VH1 Top 20 Video Countdown. In January 2012, SafetySuit followed with their second album These Times, notable for its songs "Let Go" and "These Times". The album peaked at No. 7 on the Billboard 200 and topped the iTunes album chart. Later that year, the band released an EP titled "Hallelujah" which included the hit single "Never Stop (Wedding Version)". The single has been featured in People Magazine with multiple celebrity weddings using it as the soundtrack for their first dance. Several singles from each of their albums have charted and have been featured on television shows such as Kyle XY, Imaginary Mary, and The Hills. The band's releases have been met highly favorably by critics, and they are known for their very energetic live performances. They have toured with many notable artists including 3 Doors Down, The Script, Collective Soul, Hoobastank, Parachute, Daughtry, and the Goo Goo Dolls.

== History ==
=== Origins, Day After Yesterday, and Crew EP (2004–2006) ===
SafetySuit originated as a band called Crew, based in Tulsa, Oklahoma, and was originally composed of singer Doug Brown, drummer Tate Cunningham, bassist Jeremey Henshaw, and guitar players Curtis Lloyd and Jesse Carey, who met while attending Oral Roberts University. After winning a local battle of the bands, Crew began to increase in popularity in their hometown of Tulsa, OK, so the band recorded and co-produced Day After Yesterday with local producer David John. Curtis and Jesse left the band soon after to pursue other careers, and guitarist Dave Garofalo joined the band a few months later. In 2004 the band decided to relocate to Nashville, Tennessee and retitled Day After Yesterday to create the Crew EP. In the summer of 2005, the members of Crew were introduced to producer Greg Archilla and recorded a 4-song EP called Stay. The band continued to grow in popularity locally until they played a showcase at 12th & Porter where they were signed by Universal. After signing their record deal, the band changed their name to SafetySuit to avoid legal problems down the road.

=== Life Left to Go (2007–2009) ===
SafetySuit recorded their debut full-length album Life Left to Go in 2007, once again with producer Greg Archilla. In February 2008, the band released their first single "Someone Like You" before releasing Life Left to Go on May 13, 2008. The album was met with a strong reception among critics, and the album reached number five on Billboard's Top Heatseekers chart.

The album saw the release of two additional singles, most notably "Stay", which experienced success on several Billboard charts in 2009, including the Hot AC, Top 40, and Pop 100, and on VH1's Top 20 Countdown, reaching number one. The video for "Stay" on YouTube has reached over 2.9 million views as of December 2017. The song "Annie" was also released as a single, "Anywhere But Here" was featured in an episode of the television series Kyle XY, and "Something I Said" and "What If" were also featured on the MTV television show "The Hills".

=== These Times and Hallelujah EP (2010–2012) ===
In 2010, the band went back into the studio to begin work on their second album with producers Howard Benson, Ryan Tedder, and Espionage. Their first attempt at recording new material was scrapped in late 2010, as the band did not feel the songs lived up to their standards and started over. On March 21, 2011, the band announced on Facebook that the first single off the new record would be titled "Get Around This," produced by Espionage, and available for download on April 19, 2011. On July 6, 2011, the video for "Get Around This" premiered on www.noisecreep.com. A second single "Let Go" debuted on September 2 by way of a Facebook application on the band's page and was officially released on September 20. The video for "Let Go" finished 2011 peaking at number eight on VH1's Top 20 Countdown.

It was announced on July 19, 2011, via a video tweeted by lead singer Doug Brown, that SafetySuit's second album These Times would be released on October 18, after being pushed back by the band's move from Universal Motown to Universal Republic during the summer of 2011. However, on September 3, the band announced via their official Twitter that the release date of These Times was changed to November 1, 2011. On October 18, the SafetySuit announced that their label had pushed the album release date back again, this time to January 2012. At the same time, they debuted an online stream of the album opener "Believe". The release date for These Times was soon after set for January 10, 2012 and was released exclusively through iTunes on January 3. During this time, Doug Brown wrote the song "May" for James Durbin's album Memories of a Beautiful Disaster.

Upon release, These Times debuted at number 7 on the Billboard 200 and at number 1 on the iTunes Top Albums chart. Several songs also debuted on the iTunes Top Pop Songs Chart; "Believe" reached number 60, "Never Stop" reached 65, and "Let Go" reached 146. Additionally, "Believe" reached 179 on the iTunes Top Songs Chart and "Never Stop" number 196. The video for the third single from the album, "These Times", was released on January 6, 2012. As of December 2017, the official video has over 1.7 million views on YouTube. The band joined Daughtry as direct support on the Break the Spell Tour which began in March 2012. On September 7, 2012, they embarked on their first ever headlining tour, beginning in Philadelphia, PA and supported by Go Radio and Taylor Barrett.

On August 28, 2012, SafetySuit released the four-track Hallelujah EP through iTunes. The EP included a cover of Leonard Cohen's "Hallelujah", an orchestral version of "Anywhere But Here", and an acoustic version of "Let Go". It also included "Never Stop (Wedding Version)" which has become the band's highest selling single to date. The song has been featured in entertainment magazines including People Magazine because of its use in prominent celebrity weddings, and is used as the soundtrack in over 45,000 YouTube videos with over 20 million plays.

=== Self-titled third studio album (2013–2017) ===
On June 26, 2013, the band announced that they were recording their third studio album. "On Your Side," the first single off the upcoming album, was released to iTunes on December 3, 2013. The album was originally planned to be released in early 2014. On January 7, 2014, the band tweeted that news about the album and tour were coming soon, but they had been absent from social media since then. On January 7, 2015, exactly one year to the day of their previous post, the band finally reappeared on social media by tweeting and posting of an image containing the words 'Don't call it a comeback' and the caption 'Now what were we saying ... ?'. On January 9, 2015, the band posted a picture of the upcoming album's track listing. On January 12, 2015, the band released a 15-second video clip on Instagram and Facebook with a preview of the song "Perfect Color."

On September 17, 2015, the band announced the second single off of the album, "Looking Up". On October 23, 2015, the single was surprise released to iTunes.

On January 28, 2016, the band kicked off their 2016 Winter Tour in Columbus, Ohio. It's their first tour since 2012.

On February 2, 2016, the band released the third song from their forthcoming album, entitled "Pause", to iTunes and Amazon Music.

On August 15, 2016, the band posted a photo on Instagram, Twitter and Facebook indicating that their next album would be released in October 2016 and would be accompanied by a new tour with Goo Goo Dolls.

The band posted on Instagram that their self-titled third studio album would be released on November 4, 2016. On October 25, the band announced on Instagram a headline tour in 2017.

In the first months of 2017, the band announced the release of a new unveiling this year. In March, they performed the song "Perfect Color" with an acoustic version of the event. In April, various socials announce that the song will be released shortly.

On July 11, 2017, it was announced on SafetySuit's Instagram page that lead guitarist Dave Garofalo would be leaving the band to pursue other interests.

=== New single and future projects (2018-) ===
In December 2017 with a post on social networks, the band's frontman announced that their stay in California had inspired them and that new music in "single" format without any album or outgoing Ep would have arrived as soon as possible. On March 13, 2018, the band announced from a post on Twitter that on the 30th of the current month, the new single "Victory" will debut on all music platforms. On July 9, 2018, with a post on social networks the band suggests the imminent arrival of a new song. Four days later, in fact, they post a short video with a background of the next single titled "Feels" out on July 27. In October the band with a tweet announces the imminent release of a new single, still untitled. Probably the release of the song will take place in 2019. During July, the band announced the arrival in August of the new single "Stuck to You".

== Band members ==
Current

- Doug Brown – vocals, rhythm guitar (2002–present)
- Jeremy Henshaw – bass (2002–present)
- Tate Cunningham – drums (2002–present)

Former

- Jesse Carey – guitar (2002–2004, with Crew)
- Curtis Lloyd – guitar (2002–2004, with Crew)
- Dave Garofalo – guitar (2004–2017)

== Discography ==
=== Studio albums ===
Year	Album details	Peak chart positions				
Year	Album details	US	US Digital	US Rock	US Heat	CAN
2008	Life Left to Go: Release date: May 13, 2008; Label: Universal Motown Records	173	—	—	5	—
2012	These Times: Release date: January 3, 2012; Label: Universal Republic Records	7	1	3	—	37
2016	SafetySuit: Release date: November 4, 2016; Label: Arena Complex Records (Independent)	—	—	—	—	—

=== Extended plays ===
Year	Album details	Peak chart positions
Year	Album details	US Indie
2003	Day After Yesterday (as Crew): Release date: 2003; Label: Independent	—
2004	Crew EP (as Crew): Release date: 2004; Label: Independent	—
2006	Stay (as Crew): Release date: 2006; Label: Independent	—
2012	Hallelujah: Release date: August 28, 2012; Label: Arena Complex Records (Independent)	46
2017	#YouAreThePerfectColor: Release date: November 15, 2017; Label: Arena Complex Records (Independent)	—

=== Singles ===
Year	Single	Peak chart positions					Album
Year	Single	US Adult	US Alt	US Rock Digital	US Heat	JPN	Album
2008	"Someone Like You"	27	17	—	—	—	Life Left to Go
2009	"Stay"	17	—	—	44	36	Life Left to Go
2009	"Annie"	—	—	—	—	—	Life Left to Go
2011	"Get Around This"	—	—	—	—	—	These Times
2011	"Let Go"	39	—	—	—	39	These Times
2012	"These Times"	—	—	—	—	—	These Times
2013	"On Your Side"	—	—	—	—	—	SafetySuit
2015	"Looking Up"	—	—	48	—	—	SafetySuit
2017	"Perfect Color"	—	—	—	—	—	#YouAreThePerfectColor - EP
2018	"Victory"	—	—	—	—	—	Non-album singles
2018	"Feels"	—	—	—	—	—	Non-album singles
2019	"Stuck to You"	—	—	—	—	—	Non-album singles
2023	"Good Day To Be Alive"	—	—	—	—	—	Non-album singles
"—" denotes releases that did not chart "×" denotes periods where charts did not exist or were not archived.

==== Promotional singles ====
Year	Song	Album
2016	"Pause"	SafetySuit

==== Other charted songs ====
Year	Song	Peak chart positions	Album
Year	Song	US Rock Digital	Album
2012	"Believe"	50	These Times
2015	"Never Stop (Wedding Version)"	20	Hallelujah (EP)

== Music videos ==
Year	Title	Director
2008	"Someone Like You"	Zach Merck
2009	"Stay"	Zach Merck, Damian Acevedo
2011	"Get Around This"	Zach Merck
2011	"Let Go"	Zach Merck
2012	"These Times"	Matt Pfeffer
2012	"Hallelujah"	Unknown
2016	"Looking Up"	Unknown
