= Something More (Train song) =

2001 single by Train

Single by Train

from the album Drops of Jupiter
- Released: July 23, 2001
- Length: 4:33 (album version); 4:06 (radio mix)
- Label: Columbia
- Songwriter: Train
- Producer: Brendan O'Brien

Train singles chronology
"Drops of Jupiter (Tell Me)" (2001)	"Something More" (2001)	"She's on Fire" (2002)

Music video
- "Something More" on YouTube

"Something More" is the second single from American rock band Train's second studio album, Drops of Jupiter. The music video for the song was originally to be directed by Nick Brandt, who had completed it, but it was deemed inappropriate by the band's label after the September 11 attacks due to it being shot around a skyscraper. The second music video was directed by Marc Smerling, his second of three Train music videos, and took place in an Arizona desert.

== Track listings ==
Australian single

1. "Something More" (pop mix)
2. "I Wish You Would" (live)
3. "Eggplant" (live)
4. "Free" (live)

European single

1. "Something More" (album version)
2. "Drops of Jupiter (Tell Me)" (live)
3. "I Wish You Would" (live)
4. "Eggplant" (live)

== Charts ==
=== Weekly charts ===
Weekly chart performance for "Something More"
Chart (2001)	Peak position
Australia (ARIA)	87
US Bubbling Under Hot 100 (Billboard)	15
US Adult Alternative Airplay (Billboard)	7
US Adult Pop Airplay (Billboard)	20

=== Year-end charts ===
2001 year-end chart performance for "Something More"
Chart (2001)	Position
US Adult Top 40 (Billboard)	78
US Triple-A (Billboard)	45

2002 year-end chart performance for "Something More"
Chart (2001)	Position
US Adult Top 40 (Billboard)	56

== Release history ==
Region	Date	Format(s)	Label(s)	Ref.
United States	July 23, 2001	Triple A radio	Columbia	
United States	September 10, 2001	Hot adult contemporary radio	Columbia	
United States	September 11, 2001	Mainstream rock; active rock; alternative radio	Columbia	
Australia	November 19, 2001	CD	Columbia	
