= Someone like You (SafetySuit song) =

"Someone Like You"

Single by SafetySuit

from the album Life Left to Go
- Released: February 12, 2008
- Recorded: 2008
- Genre: Alternative rock
- Length: 3:57
- Label: Universal Motown
- Songwriter(s): Douglas Brown

SafetySuit singles chronology
"Someone Like You" (2008)	"Stay" (2009)

"Someone Like You" is the first single by alternative rock band SafetySuit from their debut album, Life Left to Go. It peaked at No. 17 on the Billboard Modern Rock chart and No. 27 on the Adult Top 40 chart.

== Chart performance ==
Chart (2008)	Peak position
U.S. Billboard Adult Top 40	27
U.S. Billboard Modern Rock Tracks	17
