= Stay (SafetySuit song) =

Single by SafetySuit

from the album Life Left to Go
- Released: March 10, 2009
- Recorded: 2008
- Genre: Alternative rock
- Length: 4:24 (Album Version); 4:02 (Radio Edit); 4:18 (Acoustic Version)
- Label: Universal Motown
- Songwriter: Doug Brown
- Producer: Greg Archilla

SafetySuit singles chronology
"Someone Like You" (2008)	"Stay" (2009)	"Annie" (2009)

"Stay" is the second single by American rock band SafetySuit, off of their debut studio album Life Left to Go.

It has peaked at #44 on the Billboard Heatseekers Songs, #92 on the Pop 100 chart, and #17 on the Hot Adult Top 40 Tracks chart.

== Music video ==
A music video was released on April 23, 2009, directed by Zack Merck. The video starts off with Doug Brown in a room with a bloody mouth. It then shows Doug with a woman driving a car on a desert road. It switches to this story and the band playing outside a motel throughout the video. Later on in the video, they are in a room at the motel. When the woman leaves the room Doug notices a large amount of money in her luggage bag. He is visibly upset when she enters the room. She is happy as she tosses him a stack of hundreds. He then shows her his police badge, which makes her shocked and upset. As she tries to leave, Doug stops her, handing her rope. She is distraught as she proceeds to tie him to a chair. She then hits Doug with a sculpture of an eagle. He is shown bleeding as he was at the beginning of the video. She then kisses Doug and leaves. After a short time, police show up to the scene and untie him. They look at him and he shakes his head no. The video ends as the police are leaving and Doug gets in a car.

== Chart performance ==
Chart (2009)	Peak position
U.S. Billboard Adult Top 40	27
U.S. Billboard Pop 100	92
U.S. Billboard Top Heatseekers	44
Japan Hot 100	36

== Release history ==
Release dates and formats for "Stay"
Region	Date	Format	Label(s)	Ref.
United States	March 10, 2009	Mainstream airplay	Universal Motown	
