= Life Left to Go =

Studio album by SafetySuit
- Released: May 13, 2008
- Recorded: 2008
- Genre: Alternative rock; pop rock
- Length: 50:48
- Label: Universal Motown
- Producer: Greg Archilla

SafetySuit chronology
Stay EP (2006)	Life Left to Go (2008)	These Times (2012)

Singles from Life Left To Go
- 1. "Someone Like You" Released: February 12, 2008; 2. "Stay" Released: March 10, 2009; 3. "Annie" Released: November 2009

Life Left to Go is the debut studio album by American rock band SafetySuit, released on May 13, 2008, through Universal Motown Records. It was produced by Greg Archilla, who had previously collaborated with SafetySuit on their independent EP. The album produced three singles, the most successful of which were "Stay" and "Someone Like You"; both charted on several Billboard charts in 2008 and 2009. The song "Annie" was also released as a single in late 2009. The album was met with a highly positive response by critics.

== Critical reception ==
Professional ratings
Review scores
Source	Rating
Alternative Addiction	5/5 stars
Melodic.net	4.5/5 stars

Life Left to Go received highly favorable reviews from critics. Tom Spinelli of Melodic.net, who gave the album 4.5 stars out of 5, declared that "if you are looking for the modern rock album of the year, this may be a top contender in your collection", as "SatefySuit releases their masterful, epic debut Life Left To Go with enormous melodic power". Alternative Addiction described Life Left to Go as "easily the best debut album so far in 2008", praising both frontman Doug Brown as "an impressive vocalist...[who] absolutely gets what it takes to make a great song--good melody and good lyrics", and Dave Garofolo, whose guitar work he called "original and unorthodox...[He is] what makes SafetySuit unique".

== Track listing ==
All tracks are written by Douglas Brown.

No.	Title	Length
1.	"Someone Like You"	3:58
2.	"Apology"	4:07
3.	"Find a Way"	4:17
4.	"Stay"	4:24
5.	"Something I Said"	3:45
6.	"Anywhere But Here"	4:30
7.	"Down"	3:51
8.	"The Moment"	3:09
9.	"Annie"	3:47
10.	"What If"	3:44
11.	"Gone Away"	5:36
12.	"Life Left to Go"	5:57
Total length:		50:48

== Personnel ==
Credits adapted from AllMusic

SafetySuit

- Doug Brown — vocals, guitar
- Dave Garofalo — guitar
- Jeremy Henshaw — bass
- Tate Cunningham — drums, keyboards, percussion

Other musicians

- Tommy Henriksen — keyboards
- Benjamin Muhoberac — keyboards

Technical personnel

- Greg Archilla — engineer, mixing, production, programming
- Matthew Barnett — assistant engineer
- Zach Blackstone — mixing assistant
- Doug Brown — engineer
- Bruce Carbone — A&R
- Aaron Chmielewski — engineer, mixing assistant
- George Cocchini — guitar technician
- Justin Cortelyou — engineer
- Jeremy Cowart — photography
- Tate Cunningham — programming
- Kyle Ginther — assistant engineer
- George Marino — mastering
- Andres Martinez — art direction, design, photography
- Benjamin Muhoberac — engineer
- John Netti — assistant engineer
- Rich Ramsey — assistant engineer
- Dave Salley — assistant engineer
- Andrew Shaw — mixing assistant
- Joe Spix — art direction, design
- Randy Staub — mixing
- Mickey Wade — drum technician

== Charts ==
Chart (2008–2009)	Peak position
US Billboard 200	173
US Heatseekers Albums (Billboard)	5
