= Mermaid (Train song) =

Single by Train

from the album California 37
- Released: December 27, 2012
- Recorded: 2011
- Genre: Pop rock
- Length: 3:16
- Label: Columbia Records, Reprise Records Sony Music Entertainment
- Songwriters: Pat Monahan, Espen Lind, Amund Bjørklund, Tor Erik Hermansen, Mikkel Eriksen
- Producers: Espionage, Butch Walker

Train singles chronology
"This'll Be My Year" (2012)	"Mermaid" (2012)	"Imagine" (2013)

Music video
- "Train - Mermaid (Official Music Video)" on YouTube

"Mermaid" is a song by American pop rock band Train from their sixth studio album, California 37. It was released as a single on December 27, 2012. The song was written by Train's frontman Pat Monahan along with production duos Stargate and Espionage, with production by the latter duo and Butch Walker.

== Background ==
Billboard.com describes that, "Train channels its inner Enrique Iglesias on this full-bodied track that takes to the sea – 'to an island so remote only Johnny Depp has ever been to it before' – where Monahan finds his true love, Ecco sandals and all. You can almost see the open, billowing shirt, shaved chest and wind-blown hair as he delivers the song's B-I-G chorus."

== Composition ==
The song is written in the key of C minor. It has the sequence of A♭–B♭–Cm-Gm as its chord progression. The song is described to have an "island flavor", such as of reggae and calypso music, with its use of acoustic rhythmic guitars. It also has a Latin influence with its use of Latin percussion.

== Music video ==
The video was filmed in Hawaii. It has the front man, Pat Monahan, being welcomed in Hawaii. He walks off to a gorgeous looking beach where he sees a little boy (Aidan James) playing the ukulele and spots a beautiful mermaid (Jessica Uberuaga) on the shore. He starts to pursue her at the exotic looking beach and during the NFL Pro Bowl where the band performs around colorful Hawaiian dancers and cheerleaders.

During the course of the video, Pat takes photos with the football players and the cheerleaders on the field. He occasionally spots the mermaid in the crowd walking by, where he tries to go after her. She ultimately disappears when he gets to the beach. At the end of the video, Monahan sleeps on the beach sand, supposedly waiting for her, where she then comes and kisses his cheeks with him asleep and unaware.

Pat told ESPN, "the fact that we got to shoot our 'Mermaid' video [at the NFL Pro Bowl] and include the players made it an experience that will forever be a highlight in our careers." The video included appearances by football Hall of Famers Eric Dickerson and Marcus Allen, as well as Josh Cribbs of the Cleveland Browns. Train was able get them in the "Mermaid" video because they actually shot it at the Pro Bowl in Hawaii when they were there to perform in January 2013. Daniel Dae Kim from Hawaii Five-0 also makes an appearance.

== Critical reception ==
The song received mixed to positive reviews. Adam Soybel of Pop! Goes The Charts reviewed the song positively, saying, "Pat Monahan’s vocal is solid as usual, the lyrics are more cohesive than usual, and since the band seems to be a streak, then I would assume this is going to be a winner rather than a wipeout per usual."

James Baase of Rock Show Critique also gave this song a positive review, stating that it's "a well-crafted song that paints a picture with words while it likens finding his current love to meeting said fabled creature on a deserted island." Highlight Magazine stated that the song is "catchy, and it brings an exotic touch very interesting".

Musically Appetizing gives it a lukewarm review, saying that it's "a Caribbean-style song...It’s fast, it’s catchy and it’s creative", though he later states "that without the Johnny Depp reference, the song would have been rather perfect" – Other critics also shared this thought; James Arthur of the Kings River Life magazine said the Johnny Depp reference was "a cringing moment, even for me." Kevin Skinner of The Daily Blam! stated that "Rappers can get away with mentioning the manufacturer of shoe they own, but when rock and roll does it, it feels lazy." Rock Freaks also mentioned this, saying, "Monahan's pop music clichés and unfunny pop culture references extend", though he then says the melody is "strong enough to render them harmless".

Sputnik Music gave the song a negative review saying that it "strives for an electropop sound, but ends up sounding like NSYNC if it were older and used less autotune".

== Track listing ==
Digital download
No.	Title	Length
1.	"Mermaid"	3:10

== Credits and personnel ==
- Lead vocals – Train
- Producers – Espionage, Butch Walker
- Lyrics – Pat Monahan, Espen Lind, Amund Bjørklund, Tor Erik Hermansen, Mikkel Eriksen
- Label – Columbia Records, Sony Music Entertainment

== Chart performance ==
=== Weekly charts ===
Chart (2012–13)	Peak position
Belgium (Ultratip Bubbling Under Flanders)	9
Hungary (Rádiós Top 40)	38
Israel (Media Forest)	8
Netherlands (Dutch Top 40)	19
Netherlands (Single Top 100)	45
US Adult Contemporary (Billboard)	27
US Adult Pop Airplay (Billboard)	12

=== Year-end charts ===
Chart (2013)	Position
Netherlands (Dutch Top 40)	97

== Certifications ==
Region	Certification	Certified units/sales
United States (RIAA)	Gold	500,000^{‡}
^{‡} Sales+streaming figures based on certification alone.

== Release history ==
Country	Date	Format	Label
United States	December 27, 2012	Adult contemporary radio	Columbia Records, Sony Music Entertainment
United Kingdom	February 18, 2013	Contemporary hit radio	Columbia Records, Sony Music Entertainment
