= Cadillac, Cadillac =

Single by Train

from the album Bulletproof Picasso
- Released: September 29, 2014
- Recorded: 2013−14
- Genre: Pop rock, folk pop
- Length: 3:23
- Label: Columbia
- Songwriter(s): Pat Monahan, Al Anderson, Butch Walker
- Producer(s): Butch Walker, Jake Sinclair

Train singles chronology
"Angel in Blue Jeans" (2014)	"Cadillac, Cadillac" (2014)	"Bulletproof Picasso" (2015)

Music video
- "Cadillac, Cadillac" on YouTube

"Cadillac, Cadillac" is a song recorded by American rock band Train for their seventh studio album Bulletproof Picasso. The song was written by Pat Monahan, Butch Walker, and Al Anderson, and was produced by the latter two as well as Butch Walker. It was released on September 29, 2014 as the second single from the album.

== Music video ==
A music video to accompany the release of "Cadillac, Cadillac" was first released onto YouTube on 31 October 2014 at a total length of three minutes and 29 seconds.

== Track listing ==
Digital download
No.	Title	Length
1.	"Cadillac, Cadillac"	3:23

== Chart performance ==
=== Weekly charts ===
Chart (2014)	Peak position
US Adult Top 40 (Billboard)	21

== Release history ==
Region	Date	Format	Label
United States	September 29, 2014	Digital download	Columbia Records
