= Give It All (Train song) =

Single by Train

from the album Bulletproof Picasso
- Released: May 19, 2015
- Recorded: 2013−14
- Genre: Pop rock, folk pop
- Length: 3:44
- Label: Columbia
- Songwriters: Pat Monahan, Amir Salem
- Producers: Azeem, Sinclair

Train singles chronology
"Bulletproof Picasso" (2015)	"Give It All" (2015)	"Play That Song" (2016)

Audio video
- "Train - Give It All [AUDIO]" on YouTube

"Give It All" is a song recorded by American rock band Train for their seventh studio album Bulletproof Picasso. It was released on May 19, 2015, as the fourth single from the album.

== Track listing ==
Digital download
No.	Title	Length
1.	"Give It All"	3:44

== Chart performance ==
=== Weekly charts ===
Chart (2015)	Peak position
US Adult Pop Airplay (Billboard)	35

== Release history ==
Region	Date	Format	Label
United States	May 19, 2015	Digital download	Columbia Records
