= Bulletproof Picasso (song) =

Single by Train

from the album Bulletproof Picasso
- Released: January 26, 2015
- Recorded: 2013−14
- Genre: Pop rock, folk pop
- Length: 3:53
- Label: Columbia
- Songwriters: Pat Monahan, Butch Walker, Trent Mazur, Michael Freesh
- Producers: Butch Walker, Whams

Train singles chronology
"Cadillac, Cadillac" (2014)	"Bulletproof Picasso" (2015)	"Give It All" (2015)

Music video
- "Bulletproof Picasso" on YouTube

"Bulletproof Picasso" is a song recorded by American rock band Train for their seventh studio album Bulletproof Picasso. The song was written by Pat Monahan, Butch Walker, Trent Mazur and Michael Freesh and was produced by the latter two as well as Butch Walker. It was released on January 26, 2015 as the third single from the album.

== Music video ==
A music video to accompany the release of "Bulletproof Picasso" was first released onto YouTube on 23 January 2015 at a total length of four minutes and 11 seconds.

== Track listing ==
Digital download
No.	Title	Length
1.	"Bulletproof Picasso"	3:53

== Chart performance ==
=== Weekly charts ===
Chart (2015)	Peak position
US Adult Pop Airplay (Billboard)	22

== Release history ==
Region	Date	Format	Label
United States	January 26, 2015	Digital download	Columbia Records
