= Burnham (band) =

American pop band

- Also known as: The Burnham Brothers Band
- Origin: Vermont, United States
- Genres: Pop
- Years active: 2005–present
- Label: Island
- Members: Forrest Burnham; Andre Burnham; Alex Burnham
- Website: www.burnhammusic.com

Burnham (also known as The Burnham Brothers Band) is an American, Vermont-based pop band, made up of three brothers: Alex, Andre, and Forrest Burnham. They are signed to Island Records and EMI Music Publishing. They appeared as an opening act on the second leg of Justin Bieber's My World Tour in late 2010 and toured with Action Item on The Stronger the Love Tour in the fall of 2011 and The Catch Me If You Can Tour in 2012.

Burnham's song "Vacation" was entered in 2013 The John Lennon Songwriting Contest and finished in the top three in the Pop category. International Songwriting Competition 2013-Entered "Golden Hearts". Out of 19,000 entrants their song placed in the top 1 percent and has reached the finals. Final voting results to be announced in April 2014.

"Catch Me If You Can" is the first single from their forthcoming debut album with collaborations from OneRepublic's Ryan Tedder, Noel Z, J SKINS, Nicholas "RAS" Furlong, Norwegian production team Espionage, Rihanna producer Brian Kennedy and Boys Like Girls’s Martin Johnson. The single produced by Ryan Tedder is accompanied by a music video.

Their second single "Don't Be Shy" was released with their EP "Almost Famous" on October 19, 2010. The iTunes only EP also includes previous single "Catch Me If You Can", new song "Automatic" and the music video for "Catch Me If You Can".

== Members ==
=== Band ===
Current

- Forrest Emerson Burnham (born February 20, 1996) (lead vocals, rhythm guitar, drums, percussion, keyboards)
- Andre Joseph Burnham (born August 13, 1993) (backing vocals, bass guitar, keyboard, piano)
- Philip Alexander Burnham (nickname: Alex) (born January 14, 1992) (lead guitar, backing vocals)

Touring

- David Wearn (born January 15, 1994) (drums, percussion)

=== Family ===
- Marianne Elizabeth Burnham (Mom)
- Phillip Anthony Burnham (Dad)
- Lily Ann Burnham (Sister)
- Molly Sven Burnham (Sister)

== Discography ==
=== Albums ===
- 2010 : Catch Me If You Can (iTunes Single)
- 2010 : Almost Famous EP

=== Singles ===
- "Catch Me If You Can"
- "Don't Be Shy"

=== Released Songs ===
- 2008 : "Goddess"
- 2008 : "Headspin"
- 2008 : "Kids Of Today"
- 2009 : "Slow Dance"
- 2009 : "Rich Kids"
- 2009 : "Perfect Saturday"
- 2010 : "Catch Me If You Can"
- 2010 : "Don't Be Shy"
- 2010 : "Automatic" (Featured in movie Crazy, Stupid, Love July 2011)
- 2010 : "Chasing Lizzie" (Seventeen Magazine Exclusive)
- 2010 : "Untouchable"
- 2011 : "Dreamer"
- 2011 : "Effortless" (MySpace Exclusive)
- 2011 : "Running to Where You Are" (Zack Tremblay Exclusive)
- 2011 : "Tell Me Your Name"
- 2011 : "Thank You"
- 2012 : "How Ya Feelin"
- 2012 : "Where Do You Go"
- 2012 : "Only Star"
- 2013 : "One More Time"
- 2015 : "Miserable Without You"
