= Drive By (song) =

Single by Train

from the album California 37
- Released: January 10, 2012
- Recorded: 2011
- Studio: Integrated Studios (New York City); Ruby Red Studios (Venice, Los Angeles)
- Genre: Pop rock
- Length: 3:16
- Label: Columbia
- Songwriters: Pat Monahan; Espen Lind; Amund Bjørklund
- Producers: Espionage; Butch Walker

Train singles chronology
"Save Me, San Francisco" (2011)	"Drive By" (2012)	"50 Ways to Say Goodbye" (2012)

Music video
- "Drive By" on YouTube

"Drive By" is a song by American pop rock band Train from their sixth studio album, California 37. It was released in the United States as the album's lead single on January 10, 2012, three months before the release of California 37. The song was written by lead singer Pat Monahan and Norwegian songwriting duo Espen Lind and Amund Bjørklund, the same team responsible for Train's 2009 hit single "Hey, Soul Sister".

"Drive By" peaked at number 10 on the Billboard Hot 100, becoming the band's third (and, to date, final) top 10 hit in the US. It was awarded a double platinum certification by the RIAA on July 23, 2012, for more than 2 million sales in the US. Internationally, the song became a top ten hit in 13 countries. Train performed the song on television series 90210 in the episode "Blood Is Thicker Than Mud", which aired on March 13, 2012. Train also performed a parody entitled "Five By" with Elmo and Count von Count for an episode of Sesame Street.

== Background ==
Singer Pat Monahan said, "'Drive By' was about meeting my wife and quickly falling in love, and being really scared about that because I was like, Man, I am not sure if this is a good idea — that something like this would happen so quickly. Because I think generally when you're looking for something big you're not gonna find it, and when you're not looking for that thing it's gonna probably show up and get you. And so, 'Drive By' was all about realizing that I have to not worry about it and just let it be what it is."

Monahan said the lyric, "Hefty bag to hold my love" was inspired by when he used to work at a restaurant in Erie, Pennsylvania. He and his friends would sneak the owner's beer out of the fridge, hide it in trash bags in the dumpster, and then take it home and drink it when their shift was over. This made him associate Hefty bags with holding things that made him happy. When the song was released, Hefty sent him several boxes of garbage bags in gratitude for the shout-out. The "shy guy" in the lyrics came from his restaurant days, when he went to a party where he was scared to talk to anyone. A husband of his coworker, who was a very large but kind man, came up to him and called him "Shy guy."

In July 2011, months before the song's official release, Monahan performed the song in a live performance at the Cricket Amphitheater in Chula Vista, California as part of the band's summer tour.

== Composition ==
"Drive By" is a pop rock song. The instrumentation consists of "buoyant acoustic riffs and a hook-laden melody". Lead singer Pat Monahan sings in a characteristic "sing-talk vocal croon".

The song is in the key of C♯ minor, the chord structure is based on the IV–I–V–vi chord progression, and its tempo is 122 BPM.

== Critical reception ==
Billboard gave the song a positive review stating:

"Drive By" starts with a staccato guitar strum and a percussive thump that certainly recalls its predecessor, with a slight ethnic flavor that makes it recall a Bar Mitzvah reception. Frontman Pat Monahan semi-speaks the [verses] in tuneful, rap-like cadence, then turns to smooth pop singing for the choruses. The lyric, however, is a bit darker [...] Monahan pleads with enough joyful exuberance that she -- and we -- might just buy it.

Writing for Idolator, Becky Bain called the song an "upbeat tune", though noting its potential to become "as big as Hey, Soul Sister" and generate similar backlash from listeners.

== Commercial performance ==
The single has proved to be a worldwide success primarily in the US where it has been certified double platinum and was the 19th most successful song on the Hot 100 chart. In the UK, "Drive By" sold 502,700 copies and was the 23rd best selling single of 2012. It reached number 6 in the UK, making it their highest-charting single there since "Drops of Jupiter (Tell Me)" in 2001.

== Music video ==
The music video was posted on YouTube on February 15, 2012, and was directed by Alan Ferguson. In the video, Monahan portrays a character who reconciles with an old flame during a weekend trip to Wine Country, and features the other band members driving classic cars.

The video starts with Pat Monahan on a phone call with his lover, who tells her, "You should be sorry, you're the one who left. Listen, I'm gonna be late for work. Bye." Monahan then drives to Wine Country in a 1967 Firebird.

== Track listing ==
Digital download

1. "Drive By" – 3:18

CD single

1. "Drive By [Song Edit]" – 3:21
2. "To Be Loved" (Pat Monahan, David Hodges) – 3:41

== Credits and personnel ==
Recording

- Recorded at Integrated Studios, New York City and at Ruby Red Studios, Venice, Los Angeles

Personnel

- Pat Monahan – songwriter, producer, vocals
- Espen Lind – songwriter, producer, engineer, additional guitars, bass, keyboards and backing vocals, programming
- Amund Bjørklund – songwriter, producer, programming
- Butch Walker – producer
- Mark Endert – mixing
- Francis Murray – engineer
- Jake Sinclair – engineer
- Jimmy Stafford – guitar
- Scott Underwood – drums
- Jerry Becker – keyboards
- Hector Maldonado – bass

Credits adapted from "Drive By" CD single liner notes.

== Charts ==
=== Weekly charts ===
Weekly chart performance for "Drive By"
Chart (2012–2013)	Peak position
Australia (ARIA)	13
Austria (Ö3 Austria Top 40)	4
Belgium (Ultratop 50 Flanders)	21
Belgium (Ultratop 50 Wallonia)	29
Canada Hot 100 (Billboard)	11
Canada AC (Billboard)	1
Canada CHR/Top 40 (Billboard)	24
Canada Hot AC (Billboard)	3
Czech Republic Airplay (ČNS IFPI)	2
Denmark (Tracklisten)	5
Euro Digital Song Sales (Billboard)	5
Finland (Suomen virallinen lista)	3
France (SNEP)	31
Germany (GfK)	3
Hungary (Rádiós Top 40)	1
Ireland (IRMA)	8
Italy (FIMI)	3
Lebanon (Lebanese Top 20)	1
Luxembourg (Billboard)	5
Netherlands (Dutch Top 40)	4
Netherlands (Single Top 100)	9
New Zealand (Recorded Music NZ)	3
Norway (VG-lista)	4
Poland Airplay (ZPAV)	3
Scottish Singles Sales (Official Charts)	4
Slovakia Airplay (ČNS IFPI)	2
Slovenia (SloTop50)	32
South Korea (Gaon Music Chart)	85
Spain (Promusicae)	12
Sweden (Sverigetopplistan)	3
Switzerland (Schweizer Hitparade)	1
UK Singles (Official Charts)	6
Ukraine Airplay (TopHit)	18
US Billboard Hot 100	10
US Adult Contemporary (Billboard)	1
US Adult Pop Airplay (Billboard)	2
US Hot Rock & Alternative Songs (Billboard)	40
US Pop Airplay (Billboard)	12

2025 weekly chart performance for "Drive By"
Chart (2025)	Peak position
Russia Streaming (TopHit)	97

=== Year-end charts ===
2012 year-end chart performance for "Drive By"
Chart (2012)	Position
Australia (ARIA)	56
Austria (Ö3 Austria Top 40)	30
Belgium (Ultratop Flanders)	77
Canada (Canadian Hot 100)	15
Denmark (Tracklisten)	25
Finland (Suomen virallinen lista)	11
France (SNEP)	111
Germany (Official German Charts)	41
Hungary (Rádiós Top 40)	3
Italy (FIMI)	18
Netherlands (Dutch Top 40)	14
Netherlands (Single Top 100)	32
New Zealand (Recorded Music NZ)	16
Sweden (Sverigetopplistan)	12
Switzerland (Schweizer Hitparade)	29
UK Singles (Official Charts Company)	23
Ukraine Airplay (TopHit)	45
US Billboard Hot 100	19
US Adult Contemporary (Billboard)	5
US Adult Top 40 (Billboard)	3
US Mainstream Top 40 (Billboard)	47
US Radio Songs (Billboard)	30

2013 year-end chart performance for "Drive By"
Chart (2013)	Position
Ukraine Airplay (TopHit)	67
US Adult Contemporary (Billboard)	32

== Certifications ==
Certifications and sales for "Drive By"
Region	Certification	Certified units/sales
Australia (ARIA)	2× Platinum	140,000^{^}
Austria (IFPI Austria)	Gold	15,000^{*}
Canada (Music Canada)	4× Platinum	320,000^{*}
Denmark (IFPI Danmark)	Gold	15,000^{^}
Germany (BVMI)	Platinum	600,000^{‡}
Italy (FIMI)	2× Platinum	60,000^{*}
Netherlands (NVPI)	Platinum	20,000^{^}
New Zealand (RMNZ)	4× Platinum	120,000^{‡}
Spain (Promusicae)	Gold	30,000^{‡}
Sweden (GLF)	4× Platinum	160,000^{‡}
Switzerland (IFPI Switzerland)	Platinum	30,000^{^}
United Kingdom (BPI)	3× Platinum	1,800,000^{‡}
United States (RIAA)	6× Platinum	6,000,000^{‡}
Streaming
Denmark (IFPI Danmark)	3× Platinum	5,400,000^{†}
^{*} Sales figures based on certification alone.^{^} Shipments figures based on certification alone.^{‡} Sales+streaming figures based on certification alone.^{†} Streaming-only figures based on certification alone.

== Release history ==
Release dates for "Drive By"
Country	Date	Format	Label
United States	10 January 2012	Digital download	Columbia Records, Sony Music
Germany	23 March 2012	CD single	Columbia Records, Sony Music
United Kingdom	16 April 2012	Digital download	Columbia Records, Sony Music

== See also ==
- List of Billboard Adult Contemporary number ones of 2012
