= Drops of Jupiter =

Studio album by Train
- Released: March 27, 2001
- Studios: Southern Tracks Recording, Atlanta, Georgia
- Genres: Rock; roots rock; pop rock; alternative rock
- Length: 48:33
- Label: Columbia
- Producer: Brendan O'Brien

Train studio album chronology
Train (1998)	Drops of Jupiter (2001)	My Private Nation (2003)

Singles from Drops of Jupiter
- 1. "Drops of Jupiter (Tell Me)" Released: January 29, 2001; 2. "Something More" Released: October 2001; 3. "She's On Fire" Released: February 18, 2002

Drops of Jupiter is the second studio album by American pop rock band Train, released on March 27, 2001. The album's title is derived from "Drops of Jupiter (Tell Me)", its lead single, which was a hit internationally and won the Grammy Award for Best Rock Song.

The album contains elements of rock, country and indie rock. Besides "Drops of Jupiter (Tell Me)", two other singles were released from this album: "She's on Fire" and "Something More", both of which also achieved some success on the Adult Top 40 chart.

Debuting at #6 in the United States upon its release, it has since been certified 3× platinum by the RIAA in the United States and 2× platinum by the CRIA in Canada. It is the band's best-selling album to date.

A 20th-anniversary edition was released on March 26, 2021.

== Critical reception ==
Professional ratings
Aggregate scores
Source	Rating
Metacritic	60/100
Review scores
Source	Rating
AllMusic	3/5 stars
Drowned in Sound	4/10
E! Online	B−
Entertainment Weekly	C+
Los Angeles Times	2.5/4 stars
The Village Voice	C−
Wall of Sound	58/100

The album received mixed reviews. AllMusic writer Mark Morgenstein said that "There is nothing cutting edge about [Train]'s sophomore effort". He also stated that "Train is a classic rock wannabe band in the mold of Counting Crows, although that's not always a bad thing". Another mixed review appeared in Billboard, which wrote that "The music fails to gain any momentum until track seven, and by then, Train's lucky the listener's still spinning the CD...Let's hope that if Train's given the chance to make a third album, it'll finally fill it with clearly discernable songs."

Rolling Stone writer Aidin Vaziri had this to say about the album: "Drops of Jupiter, conjuring vivid memories of Recovering The Satellites. The anthemic song is the centerpiece here, showcasing the singer's yearning voice and band's swooping, string-laden melodies, but Train has more to offer. The brooding "Mississippi" presents an intoxicating mix of acoustic guitars and dreamy horns, while "Let It Roll" mixes mournful slide guitars and loose-limbed rhythms in the perfect meeting of blustery earnestness and unapologetic commerciality."

=== Accolades ===
Award	Nominated	Result
Grammy Award for Best Rock Song	"Drops of Jupiter (Tell Me)"	Won
Grammy Award for Best Instrumental Arrangement Accompanying Vocalist(s)	"Drops of Jupiter (Tell Me)"	Won

== Track listing ==
All tracks are written by Train.

No.	Title	Length
1.	"She's on Fire"	3:49
2.	"I Wish You Would"	4:25
3.	"Drops of Jupiter"	4:21
4.	"It's About You"	4:27
5.	"Hopeless"	4:31
6.	"Respect"	3:25
7.	"Let It Roll"	5:00
8.	"Something More"	4:33
9.	"Whipping Boy"	4:26
10.	"Getaway"	4:26
11.	"Mississippi"	5:00

Independent edition bonus tracks
No.	Title	Length
12.	"Sweet Rain"	5:20
13.	"It's Love"	4:21
Total length:		58:14

Japanese edition bonus tracks
No.	Title	Length
12.	"This Is Not Your Life"	5:02
Total length:		53:35

20th Anniversary Edition
No.	Title	Length
12.	"It's Love"	4:26
13.	"This Is Not Your Life"	5:11
14.	"Ramble On" (acoustic)	4:40
15.	"Sharks"	3:34
16.	"Sweet Rain"	5:18
17.	"Drops of Jupiter" (live at The Warfield, San Francisco, CA - May 2001)	4:43
Total length:		1:16:26

== Personnel ==
Personnel taken from Drops of Jupiter liner notes.

=== Train ===
- Pat Monahan – vocals, trumpet, saxophone, vibraphone, percussion
- Jimmy Stafford – guitar, backing vocals, mandolin
- Rob Hotchkiss - guitar, bass, backing vocals, harmonica
- Charlie Colin - bass, guitar, backing vocals
- Scott Underwood - drums, keyboards, programming, percussion

=== Additional musicians ===
- Brendan O'Brien - keyboards
- Paul Buckmaster - conductor, string arrangements, and orchestral arrangements on "Drops of Jupiter"
- Suzie Katayama – cello on "Drops of Jupiter"
- Michael Markman - violin on "Drops of Jupiter"
- Evan Wilson – viola on "Drops of Jupiter"
- Dan Smith – cello on "Drops of Jupiter"
- Chuck Leavell – piano on "Drops of Jupiter"
- David Campbell – string arrangements on "Something More"
- Carl Gorodetzky – violin and concertmaster on "Something More"
- Kris Wilkinson – viola on "Something More"
- Bob Mason – cello on "Something More"
- Fleming McWilliams – backing vocals on “Mississippi"

=== Production ===
- Brendan O'Brien – producer, mixing
- Nick DiDia – recording
- Steve Churchyard – orchestral engineer on "Drops of Jupiter"
- Ryan Williams – second engineer
- David Bryant – second engineer on "Something More"
- Karl Egsieker – assistant engineer
- Steve Genewick – assistant orchestral engineer on "Drops of Jupiter"
- Bob Ludwig – mastering
- Joel Zimmerman – art direction
- Stephen Saper – authoring
- Tony Hernandez – illustrations
- Ralf Strathmann – photography

== Charts ==
=== Weekly charts ===
Weekly chart performance for Drops of Jupiter
Chart (2001)	Peak position
Australian Albums (ARIA)	3
Austrian Albums (Ö3 Austria)	35
Belgian Albums (Ultratop Flanders)	32
Canadian Albums (Billboard)	14
Dutch Albums (Album Top 100)	3
Europe (European Top 100 Albums)	28
German Albums (Offizielle Top 100)	35
Irish Albums (IRMA)	33
Italian Albums (FIMI)	20
New Zealand Albums (RMNZ)	20
Norwegian Albums (VG-lista)	9
Scottish Albums (Official Charts)	3
Swedish Albums (Sverigetopplistan)	39
Swiss Albums (Schweizer Hitparade)	32
UK Albums (Official Charts)	8
UK Rock & Metal Albums (Official Charts)	1
US Billboard 200	6
US Top Catalog Albums (Billboard)	30

=== Year-end charts ===
2001 year-end chart performance for Drops of Jupiter
Chart (2001)	Position
Australian Albums (ARIA)	22
Canadian Albums (Nielsen SoundScan)	38
Dutch Albums (Album Top 100)	49
UK Albums (OCC)	150
US Billboard 200	41
Worldwide Albums (IFPI)	32

2002 year-end chart performance for Drops of Jupiter
Chart (2002)	Position
Canadian Alternative Albums (Nielsen SoundScan)	104
US Billboard 200	148

== Certifications ==
Certifications and sales for Drops of Jupiter
Region	Certification	Certified units/sales
Australia (ARIA)	4× Platinum	280,000^{^}
Canada (Music Canada)	2× Platinum	200,000^{^}
Netherlands (NVPI)	Gold	40,000^{^}
Sweden (GLF)	Gold	40,000^{^}
United Kingdom (BPI)	Gold	100,000^{^}
United States (RIAA)	3× Platinum	3,000,000^{‡}
^{^} Shipments figures based on certification alone.^{‡} Sales+streaming figures based on certification alone.
