= Marilou (singer) =

Canadian singer and author (born 1990)

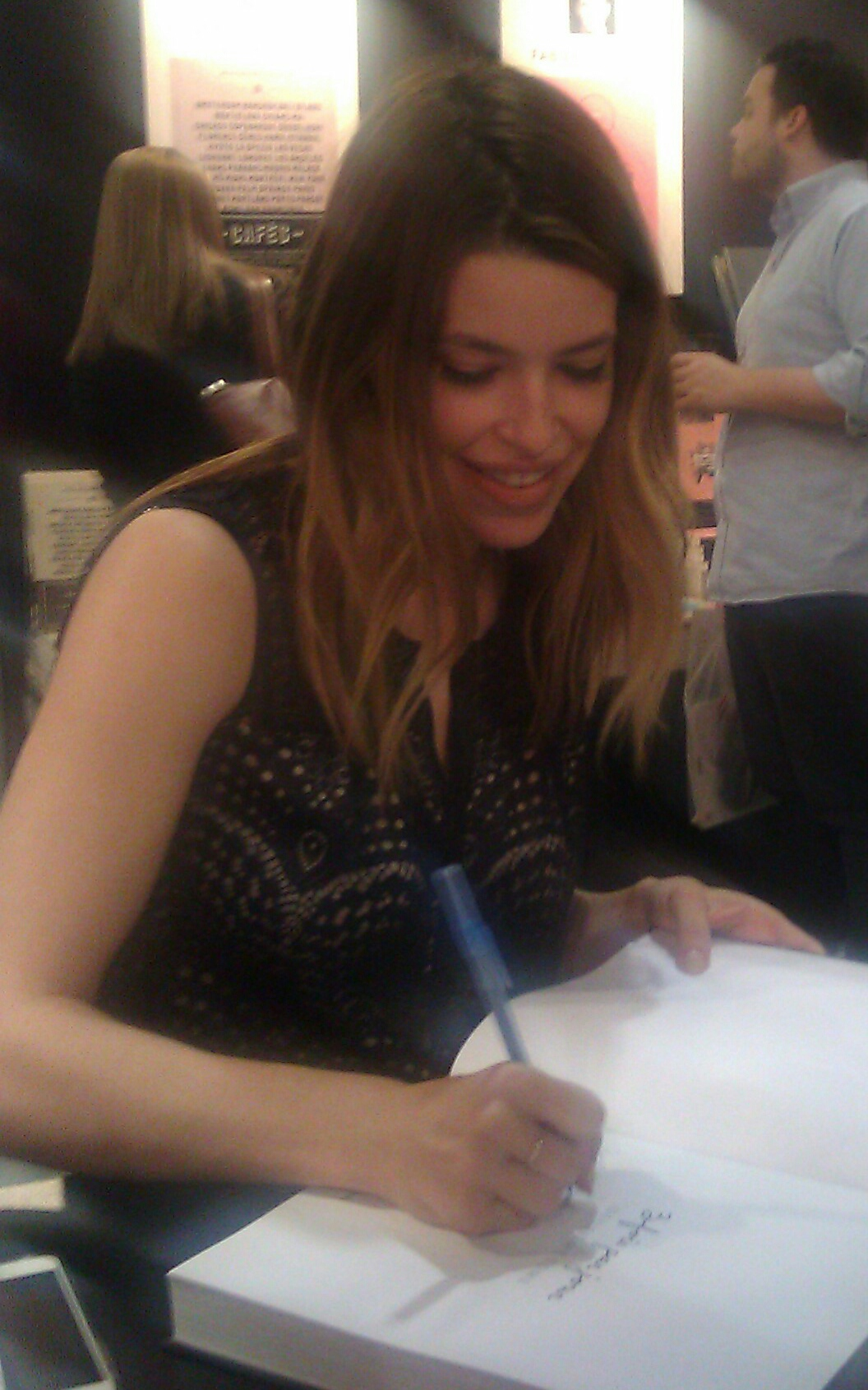

Background information
- Born: Marilou Bourdon; September 20, 1990 (age 35); Longueuil, Quebec, Canada
- Genres: Pop, soft rock
- Years active: 2002–present
- Label: Sony Music Canada

Marilou Bourdon (born September 20, 1990), also known mononymously as Marilou, is a French-Canadian pop singer and cookbook author from Longueuil.

== Early life ==
Bourdon was born on September 20, 1990. At age 8 she began singing for friends and relatives and by age 10 was already a local success. Her first appearance was at an annual concert show. She was discovered in 2001, when she sang a duet with Natasha St-Pier in a Quebec show called Stars à domicile. She started recording by singing children's songs for TV shows and movies. This led to a feature appearance at age 12 on one of French Canada's biggest TV shows, La Fureur, where she paid homage to her idol, Celine Dion, as part of a two-hour special that reached 3 million viewers. She sang Dion's first hit song, "Ce n’était qu’un rêve", to positive reviews.

== Music career ==
Her career started in 2002 with her first single, "Je serai la pour toi", in a duet with Canadian singer Gino Quilico. The song was the French version of "There For Me", covered by Sarah Brightman in a duet with José Cura. The song went to number one, the album went gold, and Marilou became a star at 12 years old. She then signed with Sony Music Canada and Sony Music France – the first joint venture between the two countries.

In 2003, Marilou sang "Everyday" and its French version "Chaque Jour" for the soundtrack of Caillou's Holiday Movie.

In 2004 Marilou was signed by Feeling Mgmt, the company owned by Céline Dion and René Angelil and together with Mario Lefebvre, they began to chart her path to success.

In 2005, at age 15, she released her debut La Fille qui Chante. One of its singles included a duet with Garou. The album was released in multiple countries and included four Top 10 singles, two of which, "Chante" and "Tu es comme ca", went to #1.

René Angélil, who also managed Celine Dion, became her manager.

After several concerts and promotions, Marilou played in Luc Plamondon's musical comedy Notre-Dame de Paris.

Marilou's self-titled sophomore album was released in 2006 and this time, the songs "Danser sur la lune", "Emmene-moi" and "Un monde en amour" went to the top of the chart. The latter was written for her by Luc Plamondon. A final song from those sessions, "Tactile", was released in late 2007 and once again topped the radio charts. She headlined her first tour in 2006 while continuing with high school studies. Later in the year, she made her "Tout simplement Marilou" province-wide tour.

As she neared her 18th birthday, she decided to try songwriting. Inspired by artists such as Alanis Morissette, John Mayer and Muse, she collaborated with multiple writers and quickly produced 30 songs. She was introduced to Sam and JB, two young Montreal hotshot producers and musicians. The three of them locked themselves in Montreal's Piccolo Studio and recorded 60 Thoughts A Minute. Featuring 13 songs co-written by Marilou, the album was mixed by Tom Lord-Alge and mastered by Ted Jensen.

== Television debut ==
Marilou premiered in the first season of the 2008 French television series Chante! (Sing!).

== Writing career ==
As of October 2015, Marilou has become more known as a chef/cookbook author along with her partner Alexandre Champagne. Her book "Three Times A Day" (or "Trois Fois Par Jour" in French) has received critical acclaim, and bestseller status, selling over 200,000 copies in Quebec as well as English-speaking Canada.

== Discography ==
=== Albums ===
- 2004: La fille qui chante
- 2007: Marilou
- 2012: 60 Thoughts a Minute (#60 CAN)
- 2013: Au milieu de mon écart
- 2023: Traits d'union

=== Singles ===
- 2002: Je serai là pour toi (duet with Gino Quilico)
- 2005: "Tu es comme ça" (duet with Garou)
- 2005: "Chante"
- 2007: "Danser sur la lune" (solo in Canada, duet with Merwan Rim in France)
- 2007: "Emmène-moi"
- 2008: "Tactile"
- 2012: "Bruises" (duet with Train)
- 2020: "Rose pâle"
- 2022: "Rosie"
- 2022: "La Fumée des bougies"
- 2023: "Les Artifices"
- 2023: "Trop grand ici"
- 2023: "Ta lettre"

=== Others ===
- 2005: "Entre les 2 yeux" (limited release in Canada)

== Filmography ==
- 2008: Chante! (French TV entertainment series)
- 2011: Funkytown
- 2012: Brave (Canadian French voice of Princess Merida)

== Cookbooks and magazines ==
- 2015: Three Times a Day (Trois Fois Par Jour) ISBN 1487000359
- 2016: Three Times a Day vol. 2 (Trois Fois Par Jour Tome 2) ISBN 2924646006
- 2015: Magazine no 1, Automne
- 2015: Magazine no 2, Hiver
- 2016: Magazine no 3, Printemps
- 2016: Magazine no 4, Été
- 2016: Magazine no 5, Automne
- 2016: Magazine no 6, Hiver
- 2017: Magazine no 7, Printemps
- 2017: Magazine no 8, Été
- 2017: Magazine no 9, Automne
