= Drops of Jupiter (Tell Me) =

2001 single by Train

Single by Train

from the album Drops of Jupiter
- B-side: "It's Love"; "This Is Not Your Life"; "Sharks"
- Released: January 29, 2001
- Studio: Southern Tracks Recording (Atlanta, Georgia)
- Genre: Rock; arena rock
- Length: 4:20
- Label: Columbia
- Songwriter: Train
- Producer: Brendan O'Brien

Train singles chronology
"Ramble On" (2001)	"Drops of Jupiter" (2001)	"Something More" (2001)

Audio sample
- file; help

Music video
- "Drops of Jupiter (Tell Me)" on YouTube

"Drops of Jupiter", initially released and sometimes still listed as "Drops of Jupiter (Tell Me)", is a song written and recorded by American rock band Train. The power ballad was released on January 29, 2001, as the lead single from their second studio album, Drops of Jupiter (2001). The song entered the top five of the US Billboard Hot 100 chart and also became an international hit, reaching the top 10 in eight other countries. The European single has tracks "It's Love", "This Is Not Your Life", and "Sharks" as its B-sides.

The recording features the signature strings of arranger Paul Buckmaster, who won the 2001 Grammy Award for Best Instrumental Arrangement Accompanying Vocalist(s) for "Drops of Jupiter".

== Background and composition ==
Lead singer Pat Monahan stated that the song was inspired by his late mother, who had died after a struggle with cancer, and that the opening lines "came to [him] in a dream". He told VH1's Behind the Music: "The process of creation wasn't easy. I just couldn't figure out what to write, but then I woke up from a dream about a year after my mother passed away with the words 'back in the atmosphere'...It was just her way of saying what it was like – she was swimming through the planets and came to me with drops of Jupiter in her hair."

The song is written in the key of C major and plays at a moderate tempo in cut time.

== Critical reception ==
Chuck Taylor of Billboard magazine reviewed the song favorably, saying that it "demonstrates a truly artistic lyrical bent that merits instant acceptance of this credible rock-edged song". He sums up the review saying "add piano, a splendid orchestral backdrop, and a vocal shimmering with passion and personality, and this is a runaway track for Train".

== Chart performance ==
"Drops of Jupiter" peaked at number five on the US Billboard Hot 100 in June 2001. On the Billboard Adult Contemporary chart, the song ascended to the top 10 during its 49th week, marking the longest climb to the top 10 on that tally by any act, and spent 54 weeks on the ranking. The song has sold and streamed over 10,000,000 units since its digital release in 2003, earning a diamond certification from the Recording Industry Association of America (RIAA).

On the UK Singles Chart, "Drops of Jupiter" debuted and peaked at number 10 on August 5, 2001. The track re-entered the UK Singles Chart for the week ending on April 7, 2012, at number 53 following a performance from contestant Phil Poole on The Voice UK. On the week ending April 28, 2012, "Drops of Jupiter" climbed to number 34. The song has received a triple platinum certification from the British Phonographic Industry (BPI) for sales and streams exceeding 1,800,000 units.

== Music video ==
There are two music videos for this song. The first one shows the band performing it on a stage, with a large banner reading "TRAIN" in the green-lit background. Clips of a woman performing various actions in various backgrounds related to the lyrics (e.g., Jupiter, holding her hands out in the rain) are inserted into various parts of the song.

The second, more famous video shows the band performing the song on a stage backed by a string ensemble. As the video progresses, people come in to watch the song being performed. The video was shot at Union Station in Los Angeles, and was directed by Nigel Dick. It was released in July. The first version of this particular video also featured the story of a girl who ran away from home and, upon arriving at the station where the band was playing, was so moved that she decided to return home. However, this storyline was dropped during the editing process.

== Awards ==
The song was nominated for five Grammy Awards, including Song of the Year, Record of the Year and Best Rock Performance by a Duo or Group with Vocal, winning two, for Best Rock Song and Best Instrumental Arrangement Accompanying Vocalist(s).

== Track listings ==
US 7-inch single

A. "Drops of Jupiter (Tell Me)" – 4:20
B. "Meet Virginia" – 4:00

UK CD single

1. "Drops of Jupiter (Tell Me)" – 4:20
2. "It's Love" – 4:22
3. "This Is Not Your Life" – 5:02
4. "Drops of Jupiter (Tell Me)" (video version)

UK cassette single

1. "Drops of Jupiter (Tell Me)" – 4:20
2. "This Is Not Your Life" – 5:02

European CD single

1. "Drops of Jupiter (Tell Me)" – 4:20
2. "It's Love" – 4:22

Australian CD single

1. "Drops of Jupiter (Tell Me)" – 4:20
2. "It's Love" – 4:22
3. "This Is Not Your Life" – 5:02
4. "Sharks" – 3:29

== Credits and personnel ==
Credits are lifted from the Drops of Jupiter album booklet.

Studios

- Recorded and mixed at Southern Tracks Recording (Atlanta, Georgia)
- Strings recorded at Capitol Studios (Hollywood, California)
- Mastered at Gateway Mastering & DVD (Portland, Maine)

Personnel

- Train – writing
  - Charlie Colin – background vocals, guitars, bass
  - Rob Hotchkiss – background vocals, guitars, bass
  - Pat Monahan – vocals, percussion
  - Jimmy Stafford – background vocals, guitars
  - Scott Underwood – keyboards, drums, percussion, programming
- Chuck Leavell – piano
- Brendan O'Brien – keyboards, production, mixing
- Mike Markman – principal violin
- Evan Wilson – principal viola
- Dan Smith – principal cello
- Suzie Katayama – cello, orchestral contracting
- Paul Buckmaster – orchestral arrangement and conducting
- Steve Churchyard – orchestral engineering
- Steve Genewick – orchestral engineering assistance
- Nick DiDia – recording
- Bob Ludwig – mastering

== Charts ==
=== Weekly charts ===
2001–2002 weekly chart performance for "Drops of Jupiter (Tell Me)"
Chart (2001–2002)	Peak position
Australia (ARIA)	5
Austria (Ö3 Austria Top 40)	38
Belgium (Ultratop 50 Flanders)	5
Belgium (Ultratip Bubbling Under Wallonia)	9
Canada CHR (Nielsen BDS)	1
Denmark Airplay (Tracklisten)	8
Europe (Eurochart Hot 100)	36
France (SNEP)	73
Germany (GfK)	73
Ireland (IRMA)	33
Italy (FIMI)	7
Netherlands (Dutch Top 40)	3
Netherlands (Single Top 100)	5
New Zealand (Recorded Music NZ)	5
Scottish Singles Sales (Official Charts)	6
Sweden (Sverigetopplistan)	45
Switzerland (Schweizer Hitparade)	30
UK Singles (Official Charts)	10
UK Rock & Metal (Official Charts)	1
US Billboard Hot 100	5
US Adult Alternative Airplay (Billboard)	1
US Adult Contemporary (Billboard)	8
US Adult Pop Airplay (Billboard)	1
US Alternative Airplay (Billboard)	11
US Mainstream Rock (Billboard)	19
US Pop Airplay (Billboard)	4

2010 weekly chart performance for "Drops of Jupiter (Tell Me)"
Chart (2010)	Peak position
Canada (Nielsen SoundScan)	69

2012 weekly chart performance for "Drops of Jupiter (Tell Me)"
Chart (2012)	Peak position
Scottish Singles Sales (Official Charts)	28
UK Singles (Official Charts)	34

=== Year-end charts ===
2001 year-end chart performance for "Drops of Jupiter (Tell Me)"
Chart (2001)	Position
Australia (ARIA)	23
Belgium (Ultratop 50 Flanders)	43
Canada Radio (Nielsen BDS)	2
Netherlands (Dutch Top 40)	4
Netherlands (Single Top 100)	33
New Zealand (RIANZ)	5
UK Singles (OCC)	128
US Billboard Hot 100	4
US Adult Top 40 (Billboard)	4
US Adult Contemporary (Billboard)	33
US Mainstream Rock Tracks (Billboard)	31
US Mainstream Top 40 (Billboard)	8
US Modern Rock Tracks (Billboard)	28
US Triple-A (Billboard)	1

2002 year-end chart performance for "Drops of Jupiter (Tell Me)"
Chart (2002)	Position
Canada Radio (Nielsen BDS)	29
US Adult Contemporary (Billboard)	13
US Adult Top 40 (Billboard)	9

== Certifications ==
Certifications and sales for "Drops of Jupiter (Tell Me)"
Region	Certification	Certified units/sales
Australia (ARIA)	13× Platinum	910,000^{‡}
Denmark (IFPI Danmark)	Platinum	90,000^{‡}
Germany (BVMI)	Gold	300,000^{‡}
Italy (FIMI)	Platinum	50,000^{‡}
New Zealand (RMNZ)	7× Platinum	210,000^{‡}
Spain (Promusicae)	Gold	30,000^{‡}
United Kingdom (BPI)	3× Platinum	1,800,000^{‡}
United States (RIAA)	Diamond	10,000,000^{‡}
^{‡} Sales+streaming figures based on certification alone.

== Release history ==
Release dates and formats for "Drops of Jupiter (Tell Me)"
Region	Date	Format(s)	Label(s)	Ref.
United States	January 29, 2001	Hot adult contemporary radio	Columbia	
United States	January 30, 2001	Mainstream rock; active rock; alternative radio	Columbia	
United States	February 27, 2001	Contemporary hit radio	Columbia	
Australia	May 21, 2001	CD	Columbia	
United Kingdom	July 30, 2001	CD; cassette	Columbia	
New Zealand	August 6, 2001	CD	Columbia	
United States	April 1, 2003	Digital download	Columbia	

== See also ==
- List of highest-certified singles in Australia
