= Amund Bjørklund =

- Origin: Norway
- Occupations: Record producer; songwriter

Amund Bjørklund is a Norwegian songwriter and record producer. He is one half of the production team Espionage. He is also the co-founder of music school LIMPI in Lillehammer.

Amund's songs have sold in excess of 50 million singles and albums. Amund has also appeared as a judge on Idol.

== Writing and Producing ==
Amund originally collaborated with partner Espen Lind in 1997 for Lind's solo album Red. Their partnership proved prolific with the success of the album in Europe and the pair have been co-writing ever since. In 2001, they solidified this working relationship with the formation of their songwriting and music production team Espionage. Their next award-winning song was co-written for Beyoncé in 2006. The international hit "Irreplaceable” held the number one spot on the Billboard Hot 100 for ten consecutive weeks and won the pair a BMI Urban Award for song of the year in 2008.

This massive success gave Amund international recognition as a songwriter and established him as an in-demand hit maker in the US. This recognition led to his feature as a judge in the fourth season of Norway's Idol. Espionage's success continued with the co-writing of Chris Brown's hit "With You" in 2007. Amund and Lind later formed a working relationship with Train, co-writing and co-producing some of their most successful hits. Most notable are "Drive By" and Grammy Award winning "Hey, Soul Sister". Along with writing partner Lind, Amund has written and/or produced songs for artists Beyoncé, Train, Lionel Richie, Ne-Yo, Chris Brown, and Leona Lewis.

Billboard Hot 100 Top 10 Singles

- "Irreplaceable" - Beyoncé
- "Hey, Soul Sister" - Train
- "Drive By" - Train
- "With You" - Chris Brown

== LIMPI ==
In 2018, along with Stargate producer Tor Erik Hermansen and composer Magnus Beite, Amund developed and opened the Lillehammer Institute of Music Production and Industries, also known as LIMPI, in Lillehammer. The school was formed with the intention of having the music industry itself take charge in educating and nurturing the next generation of music makers, actually working on real life examples with some of the most experienced and reputable artists, songwriters, producers, and executives in the music industry, including Amund himself. LIMPI's core subjects are music production and the international music industry, offering an intensive, year-long course that culminates in a diploma in "Advanced Program in Professional Music Production and International Music Industries".
