= Meet Virginia =

1998 single by Train

Single by Train

from the album Train
- Released: March 1998
- Genre: Alternative rock
- Length: 4:00 (album version); 3:44 (pop version)
- Label: Columbia; Aware; Red Ink
- Songwriter: Train
- Producers: Train; Curtis Mathewson

Train singles chronology
| "Meet Virginia" (1998) | "Free" (1998) |

Audio sample
- "Meet Virginia": file; help

Music video
- "Meet Virginia" on YouTube

"Meet Virginia" is a song by American pop rock band Train, released as the lead single from their 1998 self-titled first album. Serviced to adult album alternative radio in March 1998 as Train's debut single, the song took over a year to gain popularity on mainstream radio, eventually reaching number 20 on the US Billboard Hot 100 chart in January 2000, becoming Train's first top-20 hit and their first single to appear on the Hot 100. It also reached the top 20 in Canada, peaking at number 15 on the RPM 100 Hit Tracks chart.

== Background ==
When asked whether the girl in the song was real or imaginary, Train posted on Twitter that "she's real parts of real woman [sic] that make up a woman that I've always wanted to meet". Singer Patrick Monahan added that one of the women who inspired the song was bassist Charlie Colin's girlfriend, who came over from a wedding shower still wearing a long dress and high heels, and proceeded to play shortstop for Train's softball team in a game against members of the Counting Crows. This inspired the line, "Wears high heels when she exercises".

== Reception ==
Roxanne Blanford of AllMusic says "Meet Virginia" is one of a few songs from the album Train that has "inspired hooks and reflective lyrics". Christa L. Titus, of Billboard magazine in her review of their second album, called the song an "ode to a wrong-side-of-the-tracks girl full of quirky contradictions."

== Music video ==
The "Meet Virginia" music video takes place inside a diner and stars actress Rebecca Gayheart. The video was shot at the Merritt Bakery and Restaurant in Oakland, California. Located on the south-western shore of Lake Merritt at 203 East 18th Street, the restaurant closed after a fire in 2016.

== Track listing ==
Australian maxi-CD single

1. "Meet Virginia" (pop version) – 3:44
2. "Meet Virginia" (album version) – 4:00
3. "If You Leave" (live) – 3:26
4. "I Am" (live) – 4:35
5. "Train" (live) – 5:50

== Credits and personnel ==
Credits are adapted from the US promo CD liner notes.

Studio

- Mastered at A&M Mastering Studios (Hollywood, California)

Train

- Train – writing, production
- Patrick Monahan – vocals, percussion
- Rob Hotchkiss – guitars, harmonica, vocals
- Jimmy Stafford – guitars, mandolin, vocals
- Charlie Colin – bass
- Scott Underwood – drums, percussion

Other musicians

- Charlie Gillingham – organ, Mellotron, piano

Additional personnel

- Curtis Mathewson – production
- Mike McHugh – engineering
- Charles Quagliana – engineering
- Matt Wallace – remixing
- Alan Yoshida – mastering

== Charts ==
=== Weekly charts ===
Weekly chart performance for "Meet Virginia"
| Chart (1999–2000) | Peak position |
|---|---|
| Australia (ARIA) | 91 |
| Canada Top Singles (RPM) | 15 |
| Canada Adult Contemporary (RPM) | 46 |
| Canada Rock/Alternative (RPM) | 15 |
| US Billboard Hot 100 | 20 |
| US Adult Alternative Airplay (Billboard) | 11 |
| US Adult Pop Airplay (Billboard) | 2 |
| US Alternative Airplay (Billboard) | 25 |
| US Mainstream Rock (Billboard) | 21 |
| US Pop Airplay (Billboard) | 10 |

=== Year-end charts ===
1999 year-end chart performance for "Meet Virginia"
| Chart (1999) | Position |
|---|---|
| US Adult Top 40 (Billboard) | 56 |
| US Mainstream Rock Tracks (Billboard) | 70 |
| US Mainstream Top 40 (Billboard) | 79 |
| US Modern Rock Tracks (Billboard) | 95 |

2000 year-end chart performance for "Meet Virginia"
| Chart (2000) | Position |
|---|---|
| US Billboard Hot 100 | 70 |
| US Adult Top 40 (Billboard) | 7 |
| US Mainstream Top 40 (Billboard) | 55 |

== Release history ==
Release dates and formats for "Meet Virginia"
| Region | Date | Format(s) | Label(s) | Ref(s). |
|---|---|---|---|---|
| United States | March 1998 | Adult album alternative radio | Columbia; Aware; Red Ink | |
| United States | July 26, 1999 | Adult contemporary; hot adult contemporary; modern adult contemporary radio | Columbia; Aware; Red Ink | |
| United States | July 27, 1999 | Contemporary hit radio | Columbia; Aware; Red Ink | |
