= Espionage (production team) =

Norwegian songwriting and music production team

- Origin: Tromsø, Norway
- Genres: Rock; pop; R&B
- Occupations: Record producer; songwriter
- Years active: 2001–present
- Members: Espen Lind; Amund Bjørklund

Espionage is a New York–based Norwegian songwriting and music production team consisting of Espen Lind and Amund Bjørklund. It is signed to Stellar Songs and EMI Music Publishing (now part of Sony Music Publishing). Their breakthrough came in 2006 as co-writers of Beyoncé's worldwide smash "Irreplaceable", which was number 1 on the Billboard Hot 100 for 10 consecutive weeks and the best selling single in the US in 2007. They are probably best known as the producers and cowriters behind several of Train's major hits after 2009, including "Drive By" and their comeback single "Hey, Soul Sister", which is among the 20 highest selling singles of all time in the US. Espionage has received numerous BMI Awards.

== US breakthrough ==
In 2006 Lind and Bjørklund co-wrote the third single from Beyoncé Knowles' B'day, "Irreplaceable", and followed up by co-writing the third single from Chris Brown's second album Exclusive, "With You". Both were major hits that marked Espionage's breakthrough into the US market. Written together with fellow Norwegian producers Stargate, the tracks were both based on a fingerpicked acoustic guitar figure laced with a programmed beat. Lind and Bjorklund have collaborated with Stargate on numerous other tracks, such as Ne-Yo's "Go On Girl", Jennifer Hudson's "Can't Stop the Rain", and Jordin Sparks' "Just for the Record".

In 2008 and 2009, Espionage co-wrote several songs from American Idol winner David Cook's debut album, including the gold single "Come Back To Me" (No. 6 on the Hot Adult Top 40), as well as producing and/or writing songs for Cavo, Trey Songz and Elliott Yamin.

They also worked on Train's album Save Me, San Francisco, including producing and co-writing the Top 3 single "Hey, Soul Sister", which is widely regarded as the band's commercial comeback. Singer Pat Monahan explained to website GoErie.com how the song came about: "I said, 'I want to write an INXS-y song", Monahan recalled. "So, they started playing kind of an INXS-y song, and I wrote the song '"Hey, Soul Sister" to it and the melodies and started to sing it. And I was like, 'Man, this just doesn't sound great to me. One of the guys, Espen, who's like a huge star in Norway, picked up a ukulele, and said, 'Hey, how about this?' I was like, 'Are you (kidding) me?' And it made the difference. It made my words dance. It made sense. These words were meant to dance with ukulele and not guitar." It has sold close to 6 million downloads in the US and is the most downloaded song in Columbia Records' history.

Train's 2012 International hit single "Drive By" was produced and co-written by Espionage. The song became Train's third Billboard Hot 100 top 10 hit, and also a top 10 hit in 14 countries around the world. It has sold over 2 million copies in the US and was awarded a double platinum certification by the RIAA on July 23, 2012. Lind and Bjorklund also produced the band's 2012 album California 37 with Butch Walker, co-writing 5 tracks.

== Discography ==
Billboard Hot 100 top 10 singles

- "Irreplaceable" – Beyoncé
- "With You" – Chris Brown
- "Hey, Soul Sister" – Train
- "Drive By" – Train

Other selected credits

- "Enough" – Emeli Sandé
- "Restless Heart" – Matt Hires
- "Beautiful Girls Are the Loneliest" – McBusted
- "Drive By" – Train
- "50 Ways To Say Goodbye" – Train
- "Bruises feat. Ashley Monroe" – Train
- "Mermaid" – Train
- "Sing Together" – Train
- "Middle of Nowhere" – Selena Gomez & the Scene
- "Turn Me On" – Lelia Broussard
- "My Heart's a Cannonball" – Lelia Broussard
- "Everybody Vs You and Me" – Damato
- "Love Suicide" – Tinie Tempah
- "Get Around This" – SafetySuit
- "Things To Say" – SafetySuit
- "Angels" – Damato
- "Summer Rain" – Matthew Morrison
- "Good Girl" – Alexis Jordan
- "The Air That You Breathe – Alexis Jordan
- "Say That" – Alexis Jordan
- "Naked" – Kimberly Caldwell
- "Don't Be Shy" – Burnham
- "Chasing Lizzie" – Burnham
- "It's Gotta Be Love"- Lee DeWyze
- "Stay Here" – Lee DeWyze
- "Brick by Brick"- Train
- "Half Moon Bay"- Train
- "That's What I'm Here for" – Jason Castro
- "If I Were You" – Jason Castro
- "Heart of Stone" – Jason Castro
- "Brand New You" – Miranda Cosgrove
- "What Are You Waiting For?" – Miranda Cosgrove
- "Pastime" – Lionel Richie
- "Come Back to Me" – David Cook
- "Lie" – David Cook
- "Life on the Moon" – David Cook
- "Angel" – Leona Lewis
- "Can't Stop The Rain – Jennifer Hudson
- "Now You Tell Me" – Jordin Sparks
- "Just for the Record" – Jordin Sparks
- "Go On Girl" – Ne-Yo
- "Underdog" – Jonas Brothers
- "Don't Be Shy" – Burnham
- "My Little Secret" – Cavo
- "Ghost" – Cavo
- "Just Can't Have It" – Esmee Denters
- "You" – Elliott Yamin
- "Don't Change" – Elliott Yamin
- "One Word" – Elliott Yamin
- "The Very First Night" – Taylor Swift
- "I Don't Wanna Care" – Jessica Simpson
- "The One That Got Away" – Johnta Austin
- "Men Like You" – Mary J. Blige
- "I Will Be with You" – Sarah Brightman feat. Paul Stanley
- "The Last Goodbye" – Atomic Kitten
- "Cry" – Kym Marsh
