= Nico & Vinz discography =

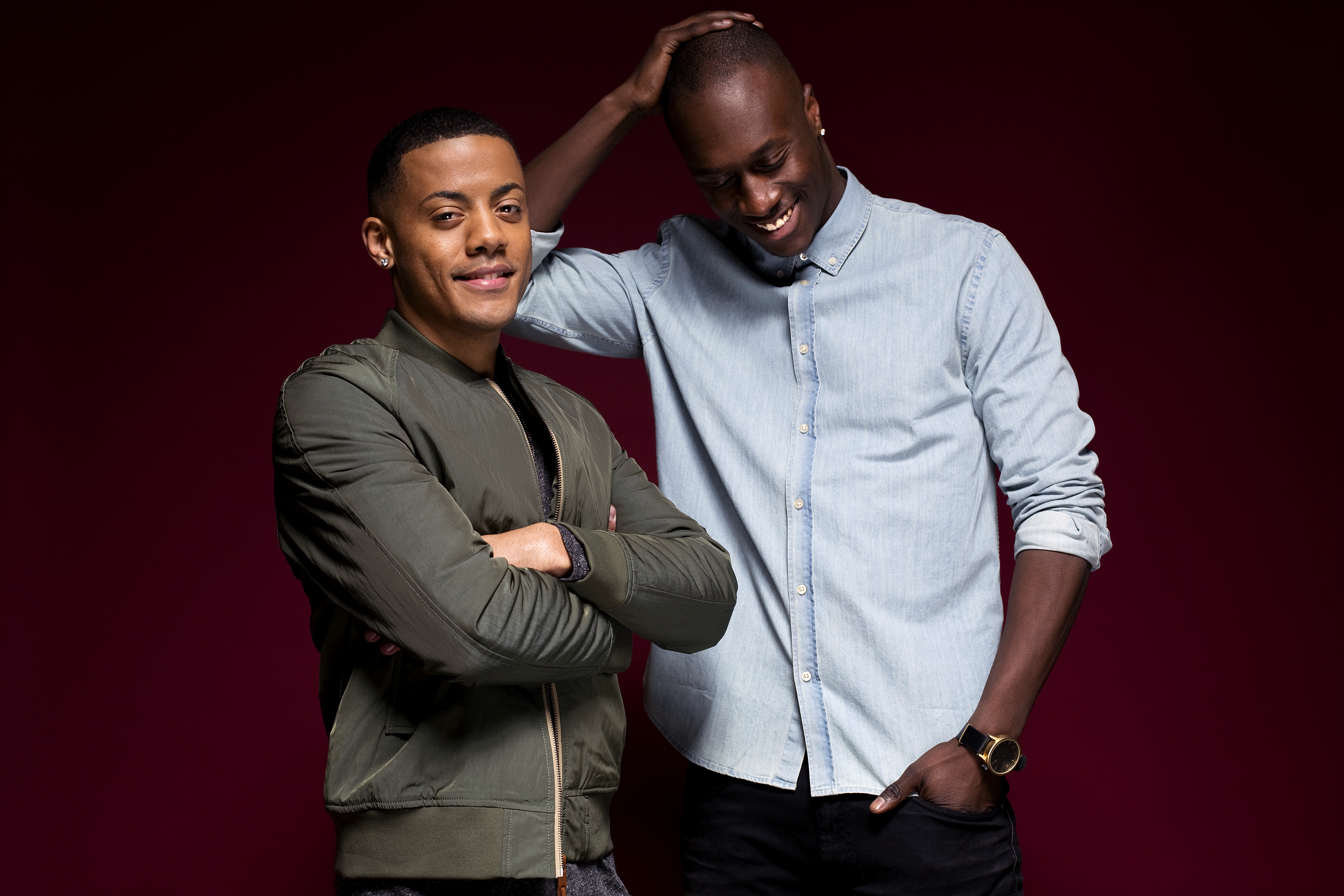
- Nico & Vinz
- Studio albums: 2
- Singles: 14
- Music videos: 12

Page includes discography releases as Nico & Vinz and earlier releases as Envy

Norwegian singing and songwriting duo Nico & Vinz has released two studio albums, fourteen singles and one mixtape.

The duo was launched as Envy with its main debut appearance at Emergenza Festival in 2011. They won first place at the Taubertal Open Air Festival World's "Emergenza Final" for new emerging artists. Following that success, the duo released the mixtape Dreamworks: Why Not Me under the name Envy. The materials were also made available online through WiMP. In June 2011, the duo released their debut single "One Song" under the name Envy. The song peaked to number 19 on the Norwegian Singles Chart. Envy released their debut studio album The Magic Soup and the Bittersweet Faces on April 27, 2012, peaking to number 37 on the Norwegian Albums Chart.

In April 2013, they released "Am I Wrong" under the name Envy. In January 2014, the duo changed their name from Envy to Nico & Vinz, in coordination with their signing to Warner Bros. Records in the United States to avoid being confused with other artists with a similar name. With international success of the single, the duo changed the credits of the single to the new adopted name. In August 2014, the song gained them their first UK number one single, and they became the first Norwegian act to top the chart in 28 years. The song also peaked at number one in New Zealand and at number 2 on the Norwegian Singles Chart, Danish Singles Chart and on the Swedish Singles Chart. It was followed up with another release "In Your Arms" which also charted in Norway, Denmark and Sweden.

== Albums ==
=== Studio albums ===
Title	Details	Peak chart positions					Certifications
Title	Details	NOR	AUS	NZ	UK	US	Certifications
The Magic Soup and the Bittersweet Faces^{1}	Released: 27 April 2012; Label: 5 Star, Universal; Formats: CD, digital download	37	—	—	—	—	
Black Star Elephant^{3}	Released: 16 September 2014; Label: Warner Bros.; Formats: CD, digital download	1	17	28	131	45	RMNZ: Platinum
"—" denotes items which were not released in that country or failed to chart.

=== Mixtapes ===
Title	Details
Dreamworks: Why Not Me^{1}	Released: 5 December 2010; Label: Independent; Formats: Digital download, CD

== Extended plays ==
Title	Details
Cornerstone	Released: 30 October 2015; Label: Warner Bros.; Format: Digital download
Elephant in the Room	Released: 3 November 2017; Label: Warner Bros.; Format: Digital download
Don't Be Afraid	Released: 3 September 2021; Label: Island Records; Format: Digital download

== Singles ==
=== As lead artist ===
Title	Year	Peak chart positions										Certifications	Album
Title	Year	NOR	AUS	CAN	DEN	GER	NL	NZ	SWE	UK	US	Certifications	Album
"Set to Go"^{1}	2010	—	—	—	—	—	—	—	—	—	—		Dreamworks: Why Not Me
"One Song"^{1}	2011	19	—	—	—	—	—	—	—	—	—	IFPI NOR: Platinum	The Magic Soup and the Bittersweet Faces
"Go Loud"^{1}	2012	—	—	—	—	—	—	—	—	—	—		The Magic Soup and the Bittersweet Faces
"Am I Wrong"^{2}	2013	1	2	1	2	3	5	1	2	1	4	IFPI NOR: 14× Platinum; ARIA: 6× Platinum; BPI: 2× Platinum; BVMI: 3× Gold; GLF: Platinum; IFPI DEN: 3× Platinum; MC: 6× Platinum; RIAA: 6× Platinum; RMNZ: 4× Platinum	Black Star Elephant
"In Your Arms"^{2}	2013	4	17	—	12	—	—	8	45	90	72	IFPI NOR: 3× Platinum; ARIA: Platinum; GLF: Platinum; IFPI DEN: Platinum; RMNZ: Gold	Black Star Elephant
"When the Day Comes"^{3}	2014	9	—	—	—	—	—	—	—	—	—	IFPI NOR: Platinum	Black Star Elephant
"Find a Way" (featuring Emmanuel Jal)	2014	—	—	—	—	—	—	—	—	—	—		The Good Lie
"My Melody"^{3}	2015	—	—	—	—	—	—	—	—	—	—		Black Star Elephant
"Fresh Idea"	2015	—	—	—	—	—	—	—	—	—	—		Nestea promotion
"That's How You Know" (featuring Kid Ink and Bebe Rexha)	2015	2	2	—	32	65	30	16	59	—	— (Note: "That's How You Know" did not enter the Billboard Hot 100, but peaked at number 20 on the Bubbling Under Hot 100 chart.)	IFPI NOR: 4× Platinum; ARIA: Platinum; IFPI DEN: Gold; RMNZ: Platinum	Cornerstone
"Hold It Together"	2016	—	—	—	—	—	—	—	—	—	—		Cornerstone
"Praying to a God"	2016	—	—	—	—	—	—	—	—	—	—		Cornerstone
"Not for Nothing"	2016	—	—	—	—	—	—	—	—	—	—		Cornerstone
"Intrigued"	2017	—	—	—	—	—	—	—	—	—	—		Elephant in the Room
"Listen"	2017	—	—	—	—	—	—	—	—	—	—		Elephant in the Room
"Don't Be Afraid"	2021	—	—	—	—	—	—	—	—	—	—		Don't Be Afraid
"Trouble"	2021	—	—	—	—	—	—	—	—	—	—		Non-album singles
"Break My Heart" (with Hook N Sling)	2021	—	—	—	—	—	—	—	—	—	—		Non-album singles
"Peace"	2022	—	—	—	—	—	—	—	—	—	—		Non-album singles
"It Ain't Over" (with Puri)	2022	—	—	—	—	—	—	—	—	—	—		Non-album singles
"Emergency" (with Hauz and bryska)	2022	—	—	—	—	—	—	—	28	—	—		[moja ciemność]²
"Forever" (with Nicky Romero)	2023	—	—	—	—	—	—	—	—	—	—		Non-album singles
"Addicted" (with Smallgod and Bien)	2024	—	—	—	—	—	—	—	—	—	—		Non-album singles
"Tar jeg feil"	2024	—	—	—	—	—	—	—	—	—	—		Non-album singles
"—" denotes items which were not released in that country or failed to chart.

=== As featured artist ===
Title	Artist	Year	Peak chart positions		Certifications
Title	Artist	Year	NOR	SWE	Certifications
"Rivers"	Thomas Jack (featuring Nico & Vinz)	2015	—	—	
"Love You Right"	Matoma (featuring Nico & Vinz)	2015	—	—	
"I Wanna Know"	Alesso (featuring Nico & Vinz)	2016	—	25	GLF: 2× Platinum
"League of Your Own"	DJ Spinking (featuring French Montana, Nico & Vinz and Velous)	2016	—	—	
"Where I Belong"	Hayes (featuring Nico & Vinz)	2019	35	—	
"—" denotes items which were not released in that country or failed to chart.

Notes

1. Credited as Envy.
2. Credited originally to Envy until renaming of the duo as Nico & Vinz in January 2014. International releases starting February 2014 were changed to Nico & Vinz as well and Scandinavian charts were amended to reflect change.
3. Credited as Nico & Vinz.

== Other charted songs ==
Title	Year	Peak chart positions	Album
Title	Year	FRA	Album
"Lift Me Up" (David Guetta featuring Nico & Vinz and Ladysmith Black Mambazo)	2014	157	Listen
"In Your Arms (Dans Tes Bras)"^{3}	2014	183	—N/a
