= Chriss Rune Olsen Angvik =

Norwegian musician and composer

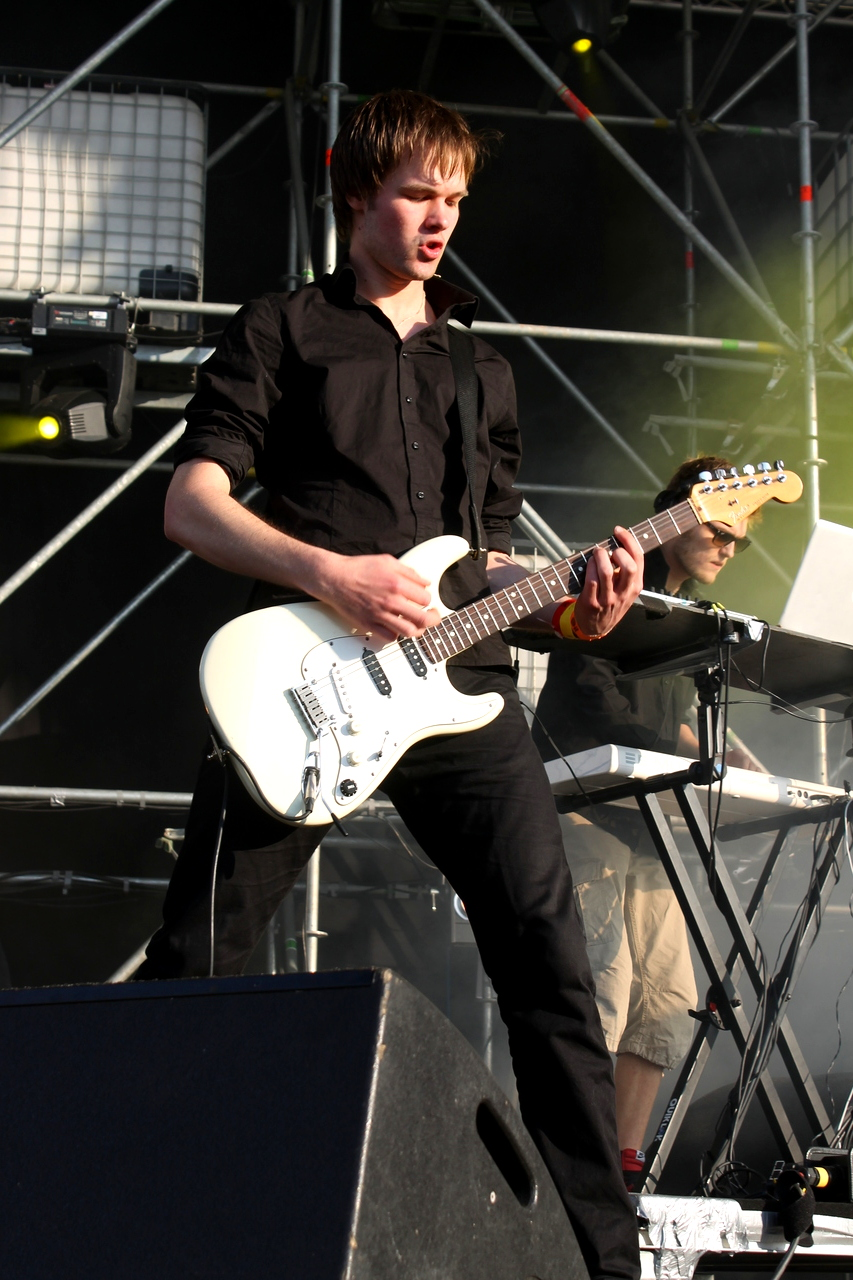

Background information
- Born: 12 August 1988 (age 38); Molde, Møre og Romsdal
- Origin: Norway
- Genres: Rhythm & blues, Alternative rock, pop rock, hip hop ,
- Occupations: Musician, composer
- Instruments: Guitar, vocals
- Years active: 2010-present
- Member of: Point
- Formerly of: Nico and Vinz, Red Hot

Chriss Rune Olsen Angvik (born 12 August 1988 in Molde, Norway) is a Norwegian musician (guitar and vocals) and composer, and known from the bands Red Hot and Envy and the current member of Point and the former member of backing band guitarist and composer for Nico & Vinz.

== Career ==
Angvik started the R&B band Red Hot together with friends from Romsdal in 2006. In 2008 they were invited to play together with Vidar Busk at the international festival Moldejazz.

He won the final of the Emergenza festival 2011, with the band Envy (Nico & Vinz). Residing in Oslo, Angvik led his own band Chemical Music.

== Honors ==
- 2011: Emergenza festival winner within the band Envy (Nico & Vinz)

== Discography ==
With Red Hot

- 2008: Hotter Than Georgia Asphalt (Bluesnews Records)
- 2010: My Arrival EP (Bluesnews Records)

With Envy alias Nico & Vinz

- 2012: The Magic Soup and the Bittersweet Faces (Universal Music Group)
- 2014: Black Star Elephant (Warner Bros. Records)

Point

- 2021: Icon
- 2022 :Echo
- 2022 : "Hold Me Now " and "The Fire"
- 2023 Marionette
