= List of Canadian Hot 100 number-one singles of 2014 =

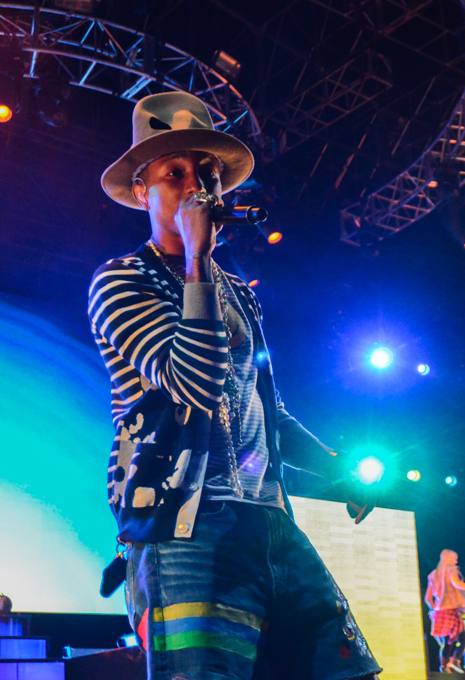
"Happy" by Pharrell Williams (pictured) spent ten weeks at number one, the longest of any single in 2014. It later ranked as the best-performing single of the year.

This is a list of the Canadian Billboard magazine Canadian Hot 100 number-ones of 2014.

Note that Billboard publishes charts with an issue date approximately 7–10 days in advance.

== Chart history ==
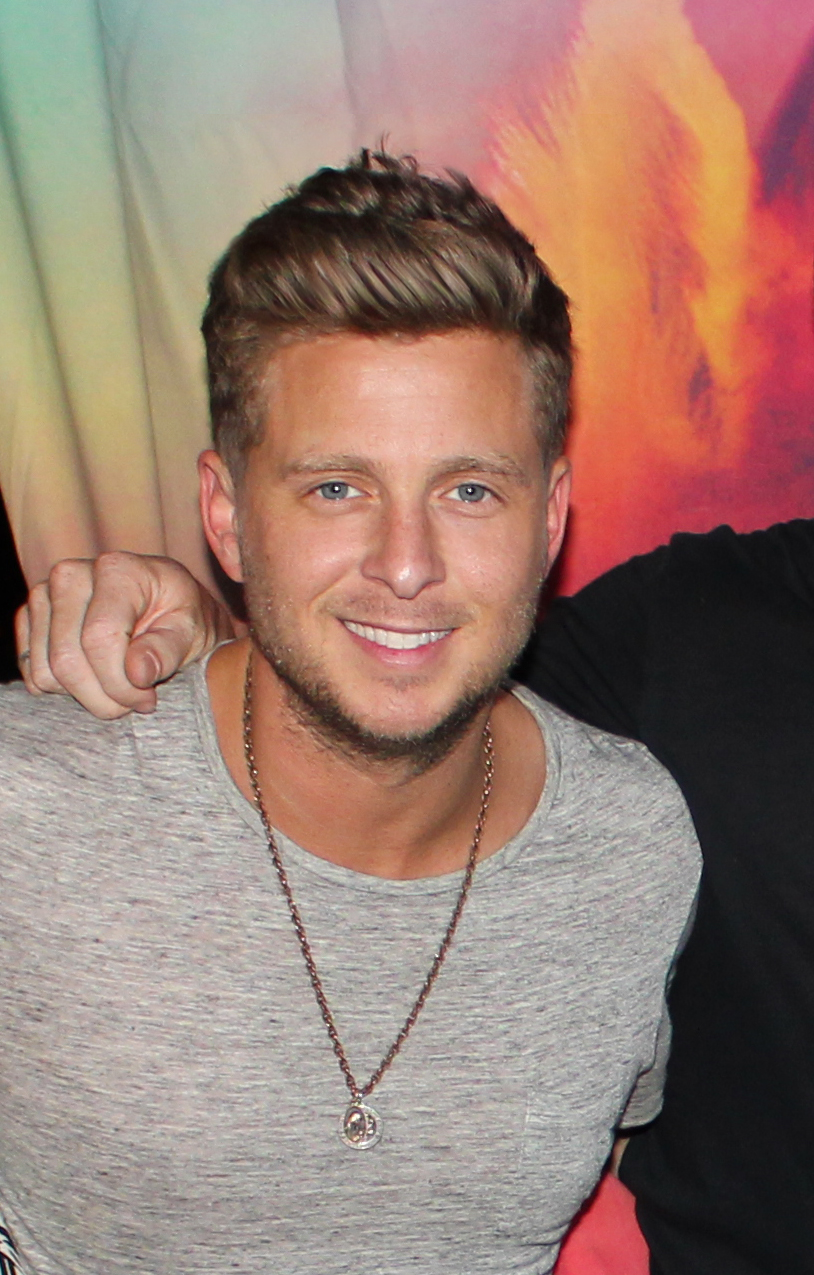
"Counting Stars" by OneRepublic reached number one after a thirty-four-week climb to the top, the longest of any song in Canadian Hot 100 history. (photo: Ryan Tedder, one member of the group).

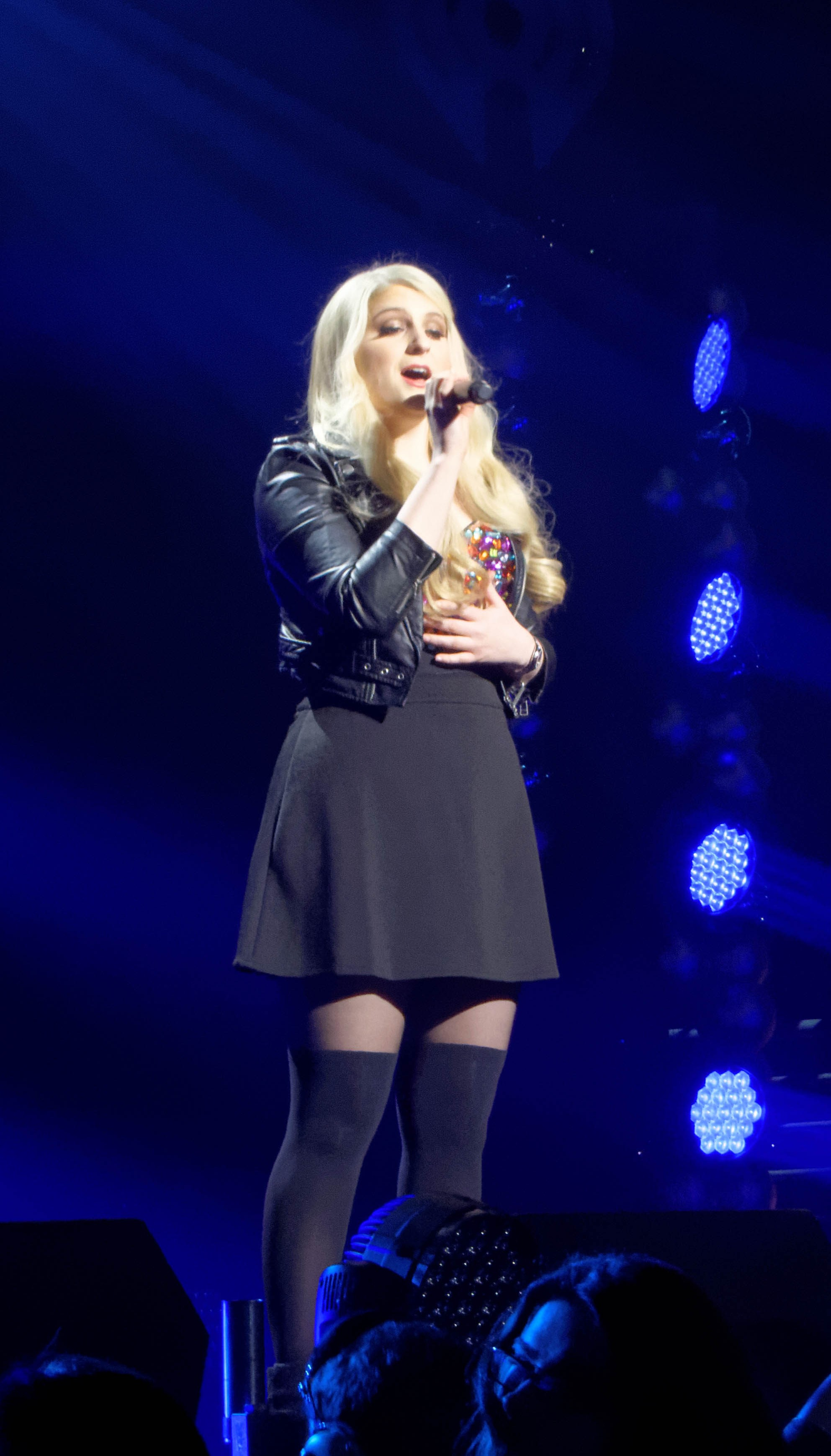
Meghan Trainor (pictured)'s debut single "All About That Bass" led the Canadian Hot 100 for eight weeks, the second longest-running number-one single of 2014.

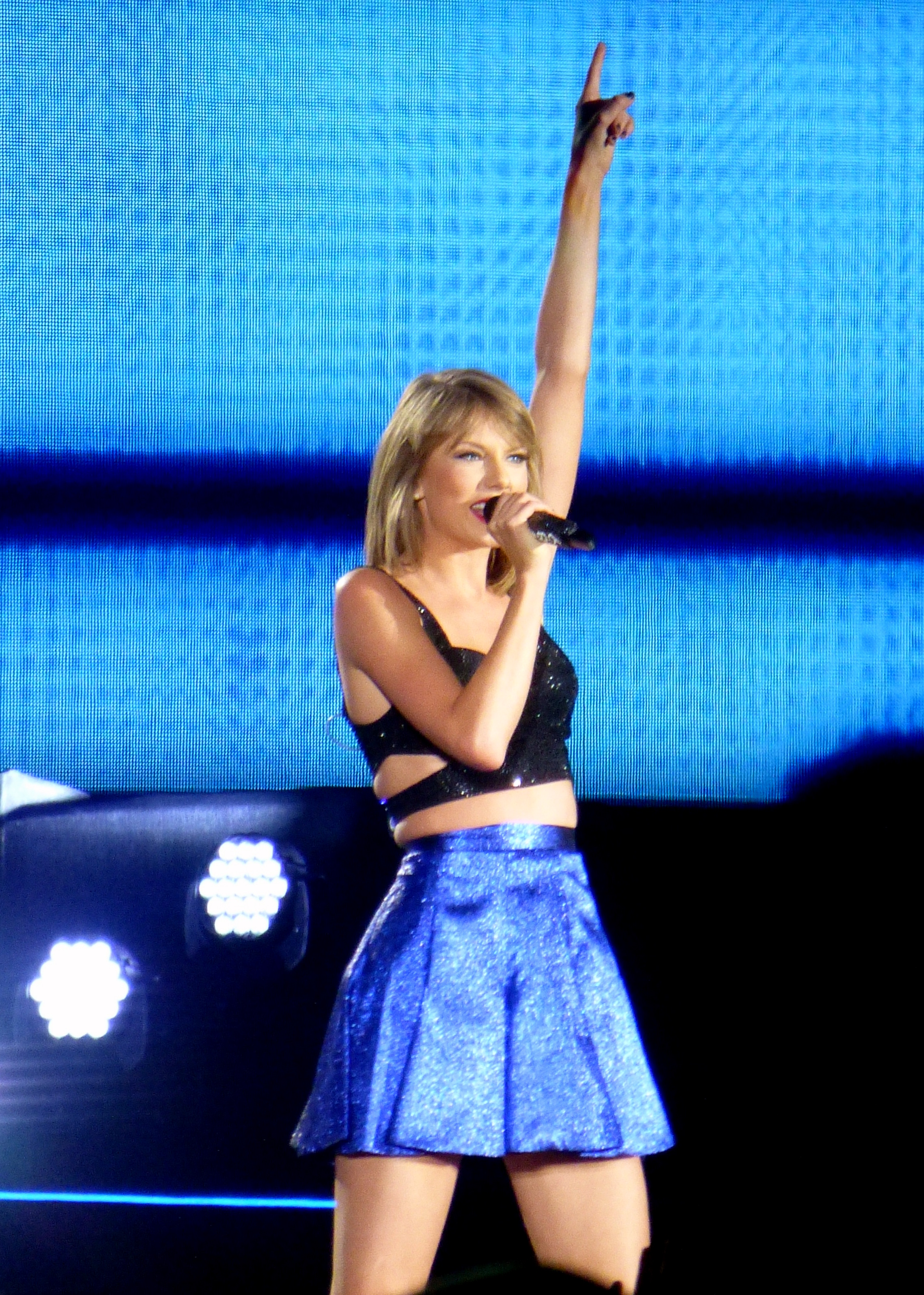
Taylor Swift (pictured) became the first woman (and the second act overall) to replace herself at number one after "Blank Space" ended "Shake It Off"'s run.

Key
†	Indicates best-performing single of 2014

No.	Issue date	Song	Artist(s)	Ref.
83	January 4	"Timber"	Pitbull featuring Kesha	
83	January 11	"Timber"	Pitbull featuring Kesha	
83	January 18	"Timber"	Pitbull featuring Kesha	
83	January 25	"Timber"	Pitbull featuring Kesha	
83	February 1	"Timber"	Pitbull featuring Kesha	
84	February 8	"Counting Stars"	OneRepublic	
85	February 15	"Dark Horse"	Katy Perry featuring Juicy J	
86	February 22	"Say Something"	A Great Big World and Christina Aguilera	
re	March 1	"Dark Horse"	Katy Perry featuring Juicy J	
87	March 8	"Happy" †	Pharrell Williams	
87	March 15	"Happy" †	Pharrell Williams	
87	March 22	"Happy" †	Pharrell Williams	
87	March 29	"Happy" †	Pharrell Williams	
87	April 5	"Happy" †	Pharrell Williams	
87	April 12	"Happy" †	Pharrell Williams	
87	April 19	"Happy" †	Pharrell Williams	
87	April 26	"Happy" †	Pharrell Williams	
87	May 3	"Happy" †	Pharrell Williams	
87	May 10	"Happy" †	Pharrell Williams	
88	May 17	"All of Me"	John Legend	
88	May 24	"All of Me"	John Legend	
88	May 31	"All of Me"	John Legend	
88	June 7	"All of Me"	John Legend	
88	June 14	"All of Me"	John Legend	
89	June 21	"Fancy"	Iggy Azalea featuring Charli XCX	
90	June 28	"Stay with Me"	Sam Smith	
90	July 5	"Stay with Me"	Sam Smith	
90	July 12	"Stay with Me"	Sam Smith	
90	July 19	"Stay with Me"	Sam Smith	
90	July 26	"Stay with Me"	Sam Smith	
90	August 2	"Stay with Me"	Sam Smith	
90	August 9	"Stay with Me"	Sam Smith	
91	August 16	"Am I Wrong"	Nico & Vinz	
92	August 23	"Maps"	Maroon 5	
92	August 30	"Maps"	Maroon 5	
93	September 6	"Shake It Off"	Taylor Swift	
93	September 13	"Shake It Off"	Taylor Swift	
94	September 20	"All About That Bass"	Meghan Trainor	
re	September 27	"Shake It Off"	Taylor Swift	
re	October 4	"All About That Bass"	Meghan Trainor	
re	October 11	"All About That Bass"	Meghan Trainor	
re	October 18	"All About That Bass"	Meghan Trainor	
re	October 25	"All About That Bass"	Meghan Trainor	
re	November 1	"All About That Bass"	Meghan Trainor	
re	November 8	"All About That Bass"	Meghan Trainor	
re	November 15	"All About That Bass"	Meghan Trainor	
re	November 22	"Shake It Off"	Taylor Swift	
95	November 29	"Blank Space"	Taylor Swift	
95	December 6	"Blank Space"	Taylor Swift	
95	December 13	"Blank Space"	Taylor Swift	
95	December 20	"Blank Space"	Taylor Swift	
95	December 27	"Blank Space"	Taylor Swift	

== See also ==
- List of number-one albums of 2014 (Canada)
