= List of Billboard Adult Contemporary number ones of 2014 =

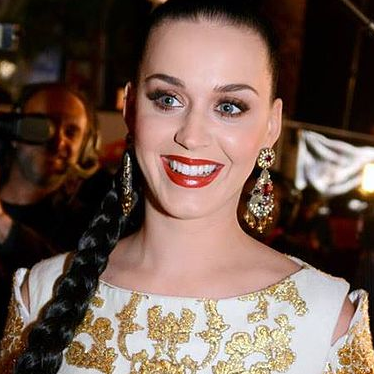
"Roar" by Katy Perry was one of two songs to spend ten consecutive weeks at number one in 2014.

Adult Contemporary is a chart published by Billboard ranking the top-performing songs in the United States in the adult contemporary music (AC) market. In 2014, 11 different songs topped the chart in 52 issues of the magazine, based on weekly airplay data from radio stations compiled by Nielsen Broadcast Data Systems.

On the first chart of the year, the number one position was held by Kelly Clarkson with "Underneath the Tree", the song's fourth consecutive week at number one. The following week, it was displaced by "Roar" by Katy Perry, which went on to spend ten consecutive weeks in the top spot, tying it for the year's longest unbroken run at number one with "All of Me" by John Legend, which spent the same length of time atop the listing during the summer. As no artist had more than one chart-topper during the year, Perry and Legend also tied for the highest total number of weeks spent at number one by an act. Both "Roar" and "All of Me" also topped Billboard's all-genre chart, the Hot 100, although in the case of "Roar" this had occurred the previous September. Another song to top both listings was "Happy" by Pharrell Williams, which Billboard identified as the biggest hit of the year in the United States. The song, taken from the soundtrack of the film Despicable Me 2, was a success across multiple markets, and reached the number one position on Billboard charts ranging from Adult Contemporary to Hot R&B/Hip-Hop Songs. It was also nominated for the Academy Award for Best Original Song.

Beginning in August, three consecutive Adult Contemporary chart-toppers were by acts from outside the United States, each of which was the act's first AC number one. Beginning in the issue of Billboard dated August 23, British singer Sam Smith spent five weeks at number one with "Stay with Me". The Norwegian duo Nico & Vinz then spent the same length of time atop the chart with "Am I Wrong", following which the Canadian band Magic! topped the chart for three weeks with "Rude", which also topped the Hot 100. Despite the success of "Rude", the Canadian group would not return to the Billboard charts, and is regarded as a one-hit wonder in the United States. The final number one of the year was Idina Menzel and Michael Bublé's version of the 1940s song "Baby, It's Cold Outside", which spent the last two weeks of 2014 in the peak position.

== Chart history ==
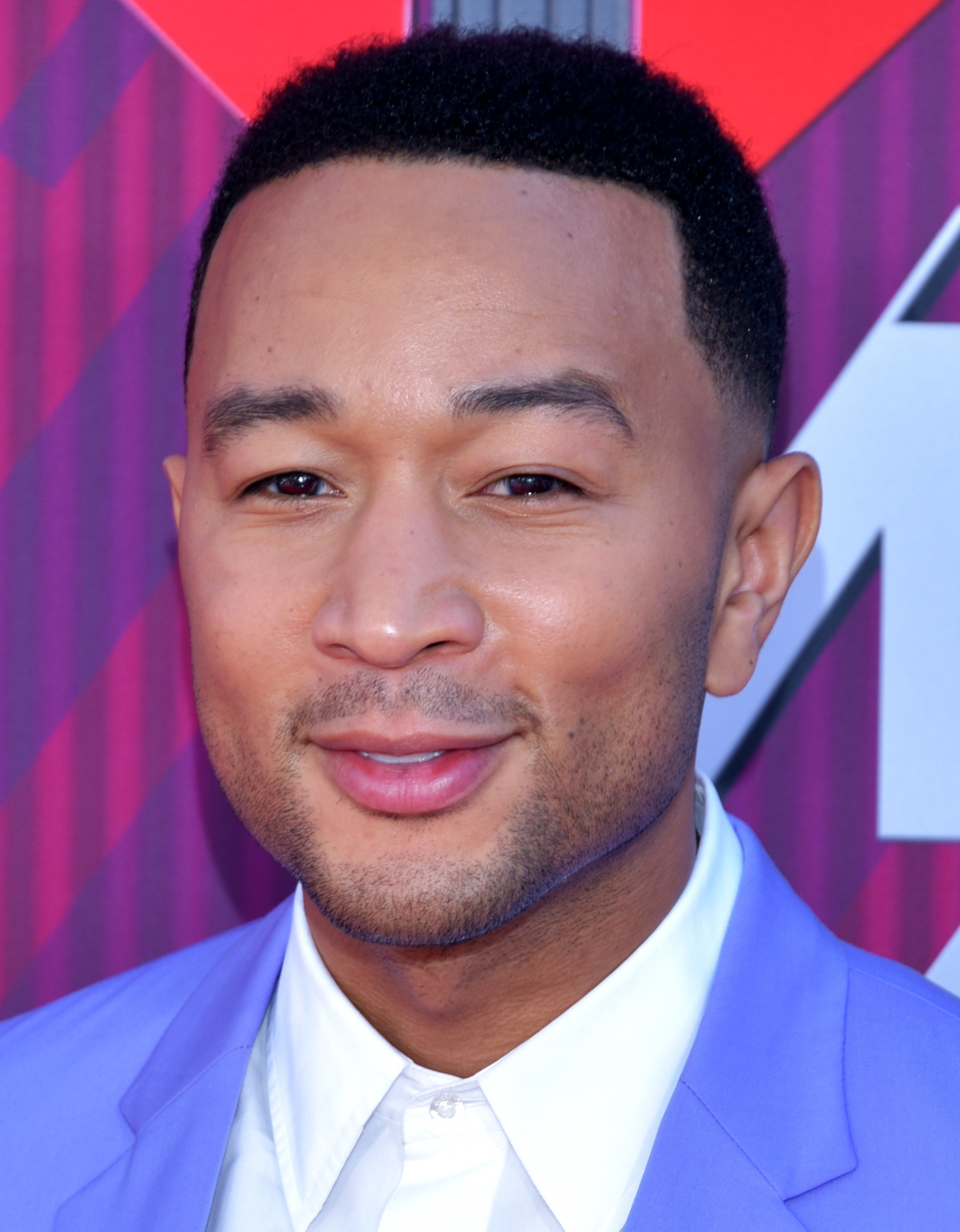
John Legend spent ten weeks at number one with "All of Me".

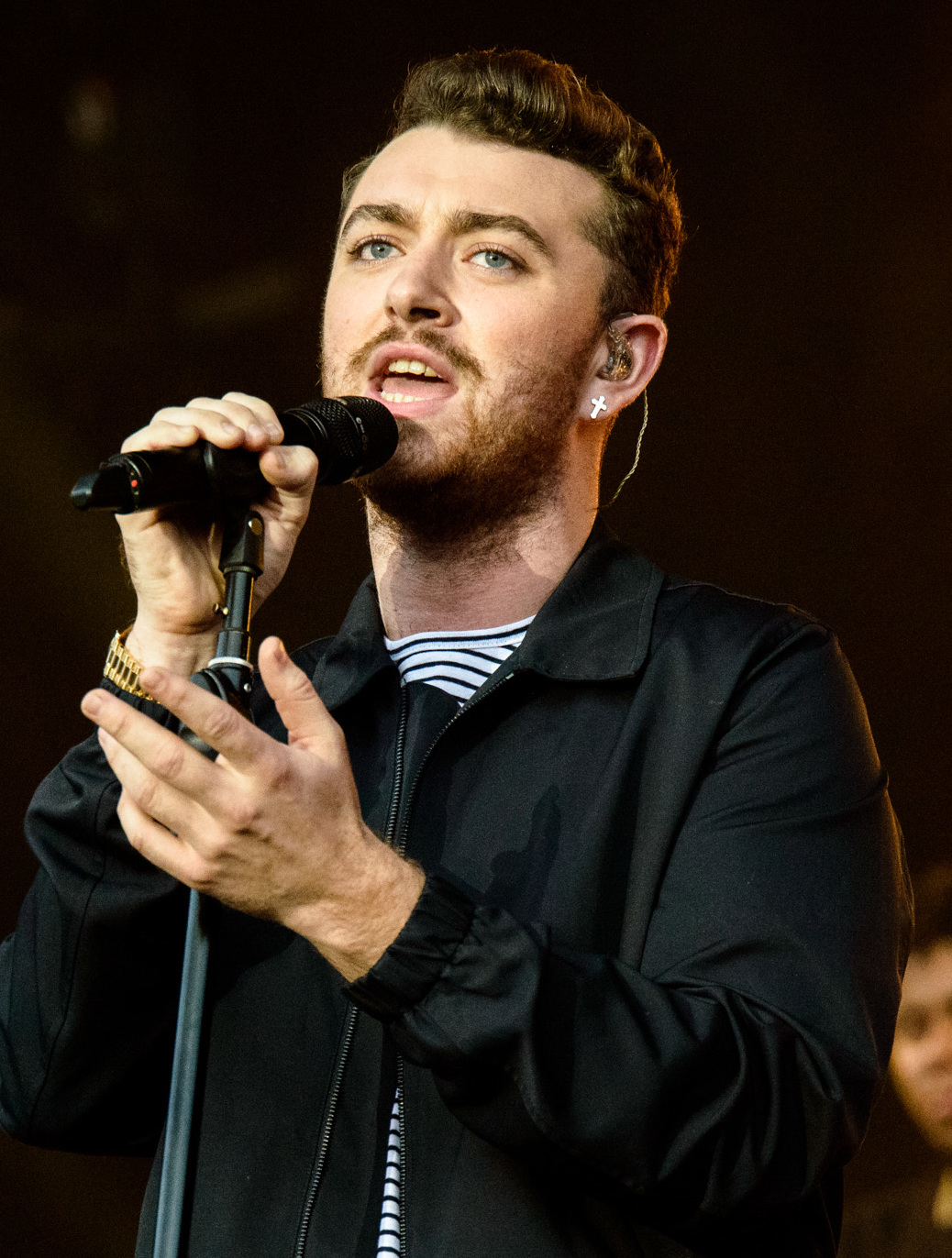
"Stay with Me" was a chart-topper for British singer Sam Smith.

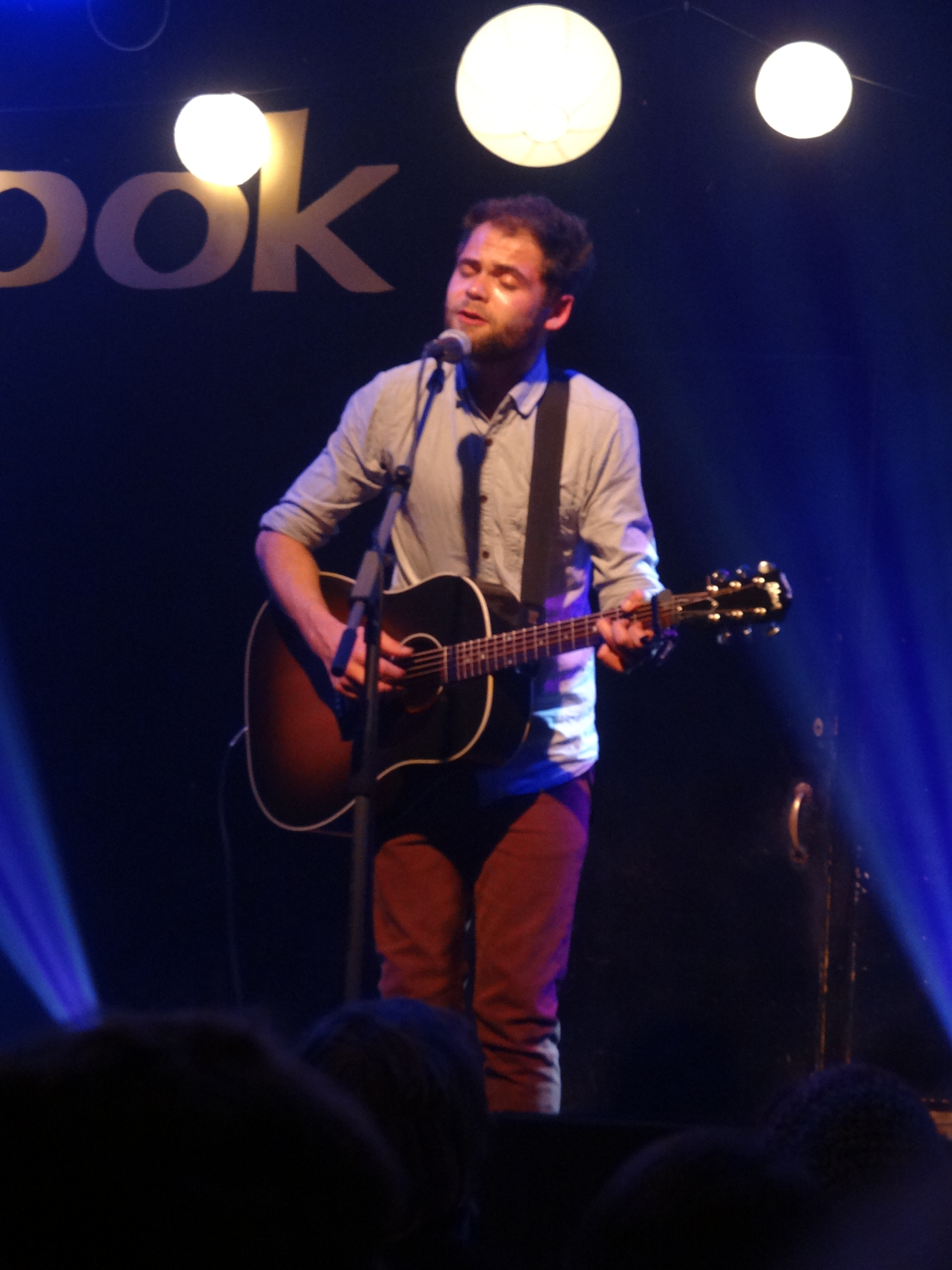
British folk-rock artist Passenger spent four weeks at number one with his song "Let Her Go".

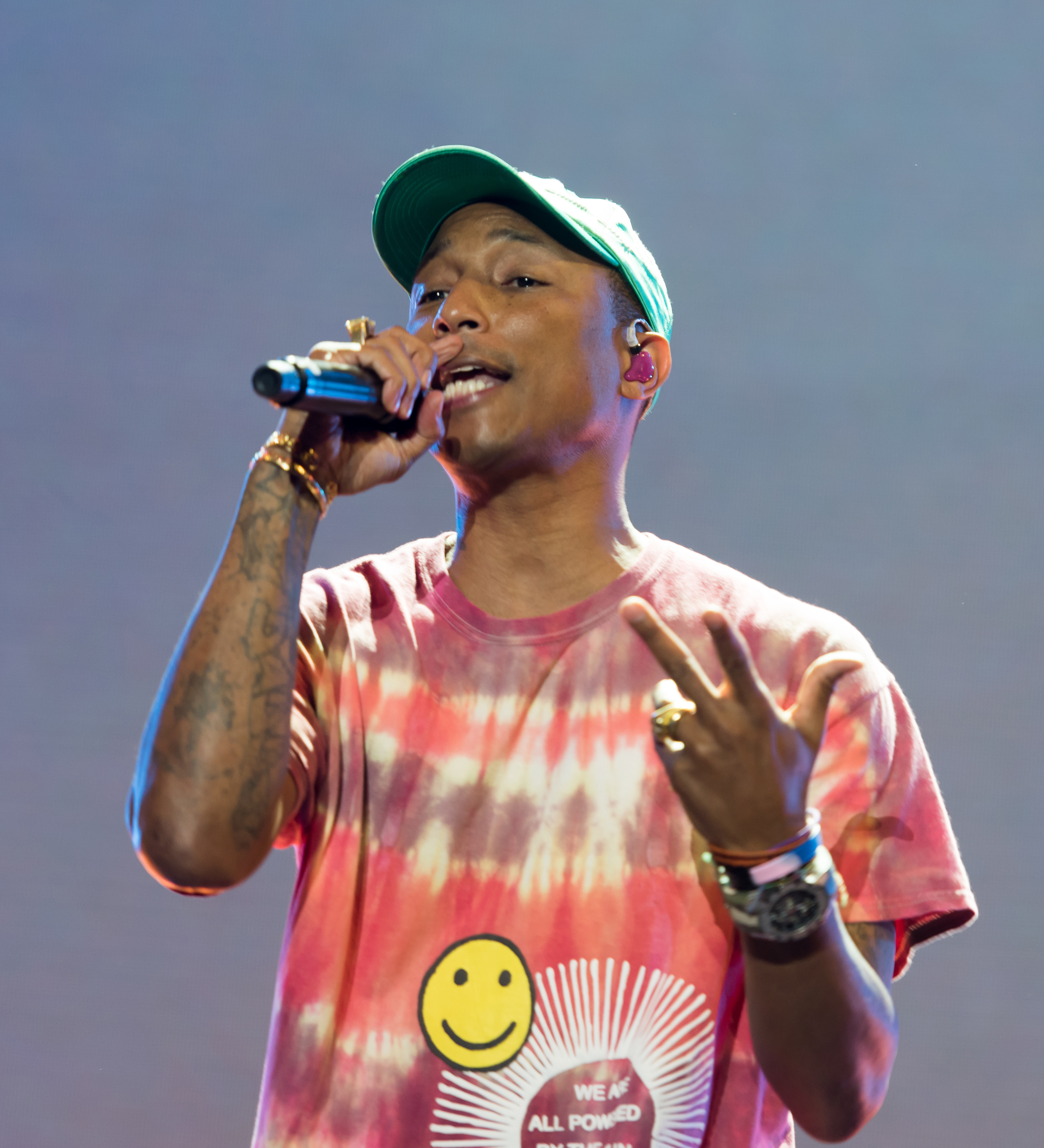
"Happy" by Pharrell Williams was one of several AC number ones to also top the Billboard Hot 100.

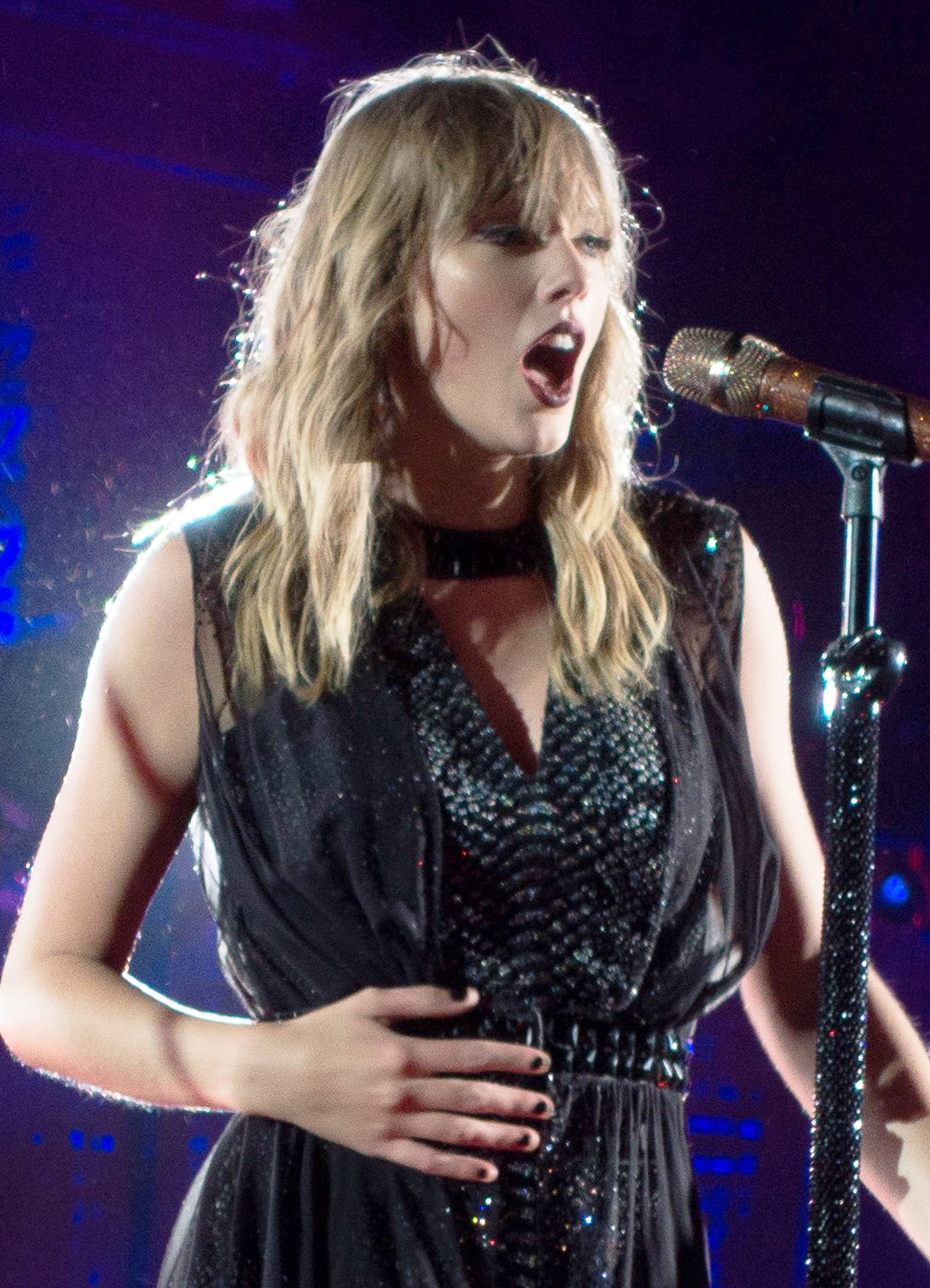
Taylor Swift topped the chart for the first time since 2010 with her song "Shake It Off" which spent four weeks at number one.

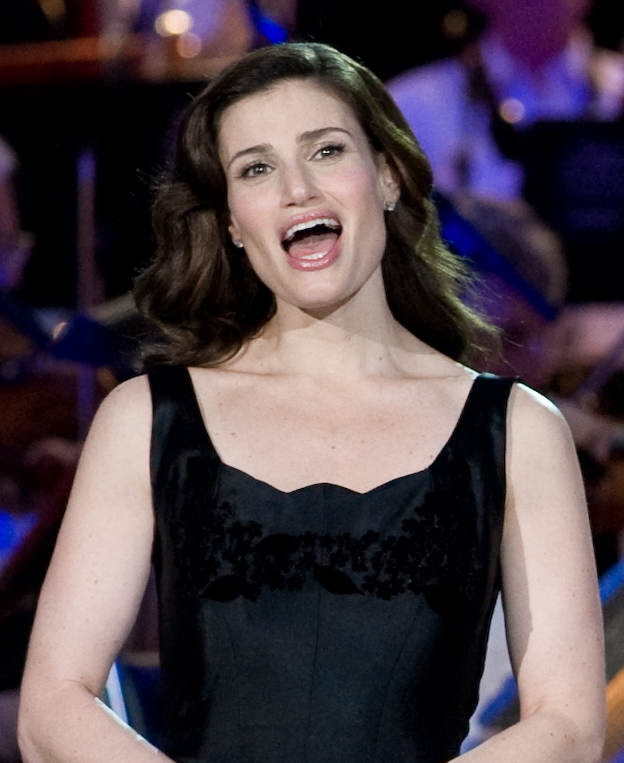
Idina Menzel ended the year at number one with her seasonal song "Baby, It's Cold Outside", a duet with Canadian singer Michael Bublé.

Key
†	Indicates best-performing AC song of 2014

Issue date	Title	Artist(s)	Ref.
January 4	"Underneath the Tree"	Kelly Clarkson	
January 11	"Roar"	Katy Perry	
January 18	"Roar"	Katy Perry	
January 25	"Roar"	Katy Perry	
February 1	"Roar"	Katy Perry	
February 8	"Roar"	Katy Perry	
February 15	"Roar"	Katy Perry	
February 22	"Roar"	Katy Perry	
March 1	"Roar"	Katy Perry	
March 8	"Roar"	Katy Perry	
March 15	"Roar"	Katy Perry	
March 22	"Counting Stars"	OneRepublic	
March 29	"Counting Stars"	OneRepublic	
April 5	"Let Her Go"	Passenger	
April 12	"Let Her Go"	Passenger	
April 19	"Let Her Go"	Passenger	
April 26	"Let Her Go"	Passenger	
May 3	"Happy"	Pharrell Williams	
May 10	"Happy"	Pharrell Williams	
May 17	"Happy"	Pharrell Williams	
May 24	"Happy"	Pharrell Williams	
May 31	"Happy"	Pharrell Williams	
June 7	"Happy"	Pharrell Williams	
June 14	"All of Me" †	John Legend	
June 21	"All of Me" †	John Legend	
June 28	"All of Me" †	John Legend	
July 5	"All of Me" †	John Legend	
July 12	"All of Me" †	John Legend	
July 19	"All of Me" †	John Legend	
July 26	"All of Me" †	John Legend	
August 2	"All of Me" †	John Legend	
August 9	"All of Me" †	John Legend	
August 16	"All of Me" †	John Legend	
August 23	"Stay with Me"	Sam Smith	
August 30	"Stay with Me"	Sam Smith	
September 6	"Stay with Me"	Sam Smith	
September 13	"Stay with Me"	Sam Smith	
September 20	"Stay with Me"	Sam Smith	
September 27	"Am I Wrong"	Nico & Vinz	
October 4	"Am I Wrong"	Nico & Vinz	
October 11	"Am I Wrong"	Nico & Vinz	
October 18	"Am I Wrong"	Nico & Vinz	
October 25	"Am I Wrong"	Nico & Vinz	
November 1	"Rude"	Magic!	
November 8	"Rude"	Magic!	
November 15	"Rude"	Magic!	
November 22	"Shake It Off"	Taylor Swift	
November 29	"Shake It Off"	Taylor Swift	
December 6	"Shake It Off"	Taylor Swift	
December 13	"Shake It Off"	Taylor Swift	
December 20	"Baby, It's Cold Outside"	Idina Menzel and Michael Bublé	
December 27	"Baby, It's Cold Outside"	Idina Menzel and Michael Bublé	

== See also ==
- 2014 in American music
