= In Your Arms (Nico & Vinz song) =

Single by Nico & Vinz (Envy)

from the album Black Star Elephant
- Released: 21 October 2013
- Recorded: 2012–13
- Genre: Pop
- Length: 3:25
- Label: 5 Star; EMI; Warner Bros.
- Songwriters: William Wiik Larsen; Nico Sereba; Vincent Dery
- Producer: William Wiik Larsen

Nico & Vinz (Envy) singles chronology
"Am I Wrong" (2013)	"In Your Arms" (2013)	"When the Day Comes" (2014)

Music video
- "In Your Arms" on YouTube

"In Your Arms" is a song by Norwegian duo Nico & Vinz. It is their third charting single after their debut 2011 hit "One Song" and the follow-up 2013 single "Am I Wrong". It was released as a digital download in Norway on 21 October 2013. The song peaked at number 4 in Norway and number 12 in Denmark. It also made the top 50 of the Swedish charts.

The song was initially credited to Envy and later changed to Nico & Vinz, as the name change to Nico & Vinz came when the single was still charting on various Scandinavian charts. The cover was also re-designed to match the new name of the duo.

== Change of name and credits ==
Norway

In the Norwegian VG-lista charts, the song was credited to Envy.

Denmark

Upon the song's entry in the Danish Tracklisten charts, the single was credited to Envy. With the change in name of the duo from Envy to Nico & Vinz however, later showings of "In Your Arms" on the Danish charts were credited to Nico & Vinz and the single, from 17 and 24 January 2014. Starting for the week of 31 January 2014, the Swedish charts began crediting it to Nico & Vinz.

International releases

The song was released in Australia on 16 September 2014. Nico & Vinz performed "In Your Arms" live on The X Factor Australia on 6 October 2014.

== Track listings ==
Digital download
No.	Title	Length
1.	"In Your Arms"	3:34

== Charts ==
Chart performance for "In Your Arms"
Chart (2013–2014)	Peak position
Australia (ARIA)	17
Canada AC (Billboard)	45
Canada CHR/Top 40 (Billboard)	41
Canada Hot AC (Billboard)	43
Denmark (Tracklisten)	12
Hungary (Stream Top 40)	33
Ireland (IRMA)	61
New Zealand (Recorded Music NZ)	8
Norway (VG-lista)	4
Sweden (Sverigetopplistan)	45
US Billboard Hot 100	72
US Adult Contemporary (Billboard)	29
US Adult Pop Airplay (Billboard)	19
US Pop Airplay (Billboard)	21

== Certifications ==
Certifications for "In Your Arms"
Region	Certification	Certified units/sales
Australia (ARIA)	Platinum	70,000^{^}
New Zealand (RMNZ)	Gold	7,500^{*}
Norway (IFPI Norway)	3× Platinum	30,000^{‡}
Sweden (GLF)	Platinum	40,000^{‡}
Streaming
Denmark (IFPI Danmark)	Platinum	1,800,000^{†}
^{*} Sales figures based on certification alone.^{^} Shipments figures based on certification alone.^{‡} Sales+streaming figures based on certification alone.^{†} Streaming-only figures based on certification alone.

== Release history ==
Release dates and formats for "In Your Arms"
Region	Date	Format	Label(s)	Ref.
United States	September 23, 2014	Mainstream airplay	Warner Bros.	
