= Where I Belong =

Where I Belong may refer to:

== Albums ==
- Where I Belong (Chris Cab album) or the title song, 2014
- Where I Belong (Rachel Proctor album) or the title song (see below), 2004
- Where I Belong (Revive album) or the title song, 2004
- Where I Belong, by Bobby Bazini, 2014
- Where I Belong, by Jascha Richter, 2006
- Where I Belong, an EP by Glowie, 2019

== Songs ==
- "Where I Belong" (Building 429 song), 2012
- "Where I Belong" (Himeka song), 2012
- "Where I Belong" (HomeTown song), 2014
- "Where I Belong" (Rachel Proctor song), 2004
- "Where I Belong" (Tanya Chua song), 2001
- "Where I Belong" (Sia song), 2004
- "Where I Belong", by Busta Rhymes from Extinction Level Event 2: The Wrath of God, 2021
- "Where I Belong", by the Beach Boys from The Beach Boys, 1985
- "Where I Belong", by Gotthard from Human Zoo, 2003
- "Where I Belong", by Hayes featuring Nico & Vinz, 2019
- "Where I Belong", by Jaci Velasquez from Unspoken, 2003
- "Where I Belong", by Joey Badass from 2000, 2022
- "Where I Belong", by Simple Plan and State Champs with We The Kings, 2019
- "Where I Belong", by Switchfoot from Vice Verses, 2011
- "Where I Belong", by Tori Kelly from Unbreakable Smile, 2015
- "Where I Belong", by the Wanted from Battleground, 2011
