= Drink Up =

Single by Train

from the album A Girl, a Bottle, a Boat
- Released: May 12, 2017
- Recorded: 2016
- Genre: Pop
- Length: 3:30
- Label: Columbia
- Songwriters: Priscilla Renea; Theron Feemster; Patrick Monahan

Train singles chronology
"Play That Song" (2016)	"Drink Up" (2017)	"Philly Forget Me Not" (2018)

Music video
- "Train - Drink Up starring Marshawn Beastmode Lynch, Ken Jeong, George Lopez, & Jim Breuer" on YouTube

"Drink Up" is a song recorded by American rock band Train. It was released on May 12, 2017, as the second single from their tenth studio album A Girl, a Bottle, a Boat.

== Music video ==
An official music video to accompany the release of "Drink Up" was first released onto YouTube on May 12, 2017, at a total length of five minutes and 18 seconds. The video depicts Patrick Monahan, Ken Jeong, George Lopez and Jim Breuer finding out that their friend, Marshawn Lynch, is getting married and that he did not invite them. They decide to crash the wedding and apparently win over the attendees who were growing bored to begin with while annoying Lynch. Eventually, it is revealed that the reason for Lynch not inviting them is because Monahan misinterpreted a message sent to him prior. All five friends make up as they continue to enjoy the festivities.

The lyric video of "Drink Up" in advance of the official video featured Monte Greene and was released to YouTube, Tidal and Vevo on January 19, 2017, at a total length of three minutes and 29 seconds.

== Track listing ==
Digital download
No.	Title	Length
1.	"Drink Up"	3:30

== Charts ==
Chart (2017)	Peak position
US Adult Pop Airplay (Billboard)	19

== Release history ==
Region	Date	Format	Label
United States	January 24, 2017	Digital download	Columbia Records
