= When the Day Comes =

Single by Nico & Vinz

from the album Black Star Elephant
- Released: 30 September 2014
- Recorded: 2014
- Genre: R&B; Afrobeat
- Length: 3:47
- Label: Warner Bros.
- Songwriters: William Wiik Larsen; Vincent Dery; Kahouly Nicolay Sereba; Jørgen Ousman Jaquesson Sowe
- Producer: William Wiik Larsen (IDAP Music)

Nico & Vinz singles chronology
"In Your Arms" (2013)	"When the Day Comes" (2014)	"My Melody" (2015)

Music video
- "When the Day Comes" on YouTube

"When the Day Comes" is a song by Norwegian hip hop duo Nico & Vinz. It was released as the third single from their second studio album Black Star Elephant (2014). It was released as a digital download in Norway on 30 September 2014. The song peaked at number 9 in Norway. It was included on the soundtrack for the 2014 video game FIFA 15.

== Music video ==
A music video to accompany the release of "When The Day Comes" was first released onto YouTube on September 30, 2014 at a total length of six minutes and seven seconds. It was directed by Kavar Singh.

The dramatic video features a Japanese warrior on a mission to save a young boy from dying.

== Track listings ==
Digital download
No.	Title	Length
1.	"When The Day Comes"	3:47

== Chart performance ==
"When The Day Comes" debuted and peaked at #9 in Norway

=== Weekly charts ===
Chart (2014)	Peak position
Denmark Airplay (Tracklisten)	10
Norway (VG-lista)	9

== Release history ==
Region	Date	Format	Label
Norway	September 30, 2014	Digital download	Warner Bros. Records
