= A Girl, a Bottle, a Boat =

Studio album by Train
- Released: January 27, 2017
- Recorded: 2015–2016
- Studios: Infrasonic (Echo Park); Kingsize Soundlabs (Eagle Rock); Bear Creek (Woodinville); Effortless (Los Angeles)
- Length: 37:09
- Label: Columbia
- Producers: Ajay Bhattacharyya; William Wiik Larsen; Neff U; Jake Sinclair

Train chronology
Train Does Led Zeppelin II (2016)	A Girl, a Bottle, a Boat (2017)	Greatest Hits (2018)

Singles from A Girl, a Bottle, a Boat
- 1. "Play That Song" Released: September 29, 2016; 2. "Drink Up" Released: May 12, 2017

A Girl, a Bottle, a Boat (stylized as a girl a bottle a boat) is the tenth studio album by American rock band Train, released on January 27, 2017, through Columbia Records. It is the band's first album without guitarist and founding member Jimmy Stafford (whose departure makes vocalist Pat Monahan the last original member to remain), as well as their last with drummer Drew Shoals.

== Background ==
The first single "Play That Song" was released on September 29, 2016. To promote the lead single, they were featured at a Holiday Jam concert for New York City's local radio station WNEW-FM (also known as Fresh 102.7) at the Hammerstein Ballroom in Midtown Manhattan.

== Promotion ==
The band promoted the album on the Play That Song Tour, which ran from May 12, 2017 to July 15, 2017 in the United States. The tour then continued overseas, beginning with Germany on October 12, 2017 and October 13, 2017, shortly followed by the United Kingdom from October 16, 2017 to October 23, 2017, along with the Netherlands and Ireland later in October 2017.

== Critical reception ==
Professional ratings
Review scores
Source	Rating
ABC News	2/5 stars
AllMusic	3.5/5 stars
Newsday	B−
Sputnikmusic	1/5 stars

Since its release, A Girl, a Bottle, a Boat has received mixed reviews among critics. Stephen Thomas Erlewine of AllMusic gave the album a positive review, claiming that A Girl, a Bottle, a Boat is "an exuberant album, a celebration of everything that makes Train such a corny band. The hooks are big, the production is so glossy that it shines, and it's so cheerful it's bound to irritate anybody who isn't on the band's wavelength. If you're with them, though, a girl a bottle a boat is a good time because of its eagerness to please."

== Commercial performance ==
The album debuted at No. 8 on the Billboard 200 albums chart on its first week of release, making it Train's sixth album to chart in the top 10. It sold 30,000 copies in the United States in its first week. It also debuted at No. 5 for Australian Albums (ARIA) and at No. 13 for UK Albums (OCC).

== Track listing ==
A Girl, a Bottle, a Boat
No.	Title	Writer(s)	Producer(s)	Length
1.	"Drink Up"	Pat Monahan; Priscilla Renea; Theron "Neff U" Feemster	Jake Sinclair; Neff U^{[a]}	3:30
2.	"Play That Song"	Monahan; William Wiik Larsen; Hoagy Carmichael; Frank Loesser	William Larsen	4:03
3.	"The News"	Monahan; Marius Moga; Julian Moga; Jake Sinclair; August Rigo	Sinclair	3:16
4.	"Lottery"	Monahan; Sinclair; Larsen; Andrew Greene; Michael Deller; Daniel F. Foder Jr.	Larsen; Sinclair	2:34
5.	"Working Girl"	Monahan; Larsen; Ilsey Juber	Larsen	3:44
6.	"Silver Dollar"	Monahan; Ajay Bhattacharyya; Sinclair	Sinclair; Bhattacharyya	3:01
7.	"Valentine"	Monahan; Larsen	Larsen	3:25
8.	"What Good Is Saturday"	Monahan; Sinclair; Suzy Shinn	Larsen; Shinn^{[a]}	3:44
9.	"Loverman" (featuring Priscilla Renea)	Monahan; Renea; Feemster	Neff U; Sinclair^{[a]}	2:41
10.	"Lost and Found"	Monahan; Larsen	Larsen	3:28
11.	"You Better Believe"	Monahan; Larsen	Larsen	3:43

Target bonus tracks
No.	Title	Writer(s)	Length
12.	"Ziplock Full of Sunshine"	Monahan; Andreas Schuller; Leroy Clampitt	3:15
13.	"Crazy Queen"	Monahan; Renea; Neff U	3:16
Total length:			43:40

Notes

- ^{^[a]} signifies an additional producer
- "Lottery" contains a sample of "Volcano Song" by the Budos Band.
- "Silver Dollar" contains a sample of "Some of These Days", written by Shelton Brooks and performed by Cab Calloway.

== Personnel ==
Train

- Pat Monahan – lead vocals
- Jerry Becker – keyboards, guitar
- Hector Maldonado – bass
- Drew Shoals – drums
- Luis Maldonado – guitar

Additional musicians

- Jake Sinclair – guitar, bass, percussion, keyboards, background vocals
- William Wiik Larsen – guitar, bass, percussion, keyboards, programming
- Neff-U – keyboards
- Max Schneider – vocals
- Ilsey Juber – vocals
- Suzy Shinn – vocals

Technical

- Mike Endert – mixing
- Ted Jensen – mastering
- Doug Johnson – mixing assistance
- Suzy Shinn – engineering (tracks 1, 3, 4, 6, 8, 9)
- Taylor Carroll – engineering (tracks 2, 11)
- Celso Estrada – engineering (track 3)
- William Larsen – engineering (tracks 5, 7, 10)

Visuals

- Brendan Walter – photography
- Jade Ehlers – photography

== Charts ==
Weekly chart performance for A Girl, a Bottle, a Boat
Chart (2017)	Peak position
Australian Albums (ARIA)	5
Belgian Albums (Ultratop Flanders)	180
Canadian Albums (Billboard)	10
Dutch Albums (Album Top 100)	61
New Zealand Heatseeker Albums (RMNZ)	2
Scottish Albums (Official Charts)	3
Swiss Albums (Schweizer Hitparade)	54
UK Albums (Official Charts)	13
US Billboard 200	8
