= Thomas Jack =

Australian DJ and producer (born 1993)

- Born: 19 April 1993 (age 33); Bemboka, New South Wales, Australia
- Occupations: DJ; record producer; musician
- Years active: 2013–present
- Musical career
- Genres: Tropical house; deep house
- Instruments: DAW; saxophone; flute; piano; guitar
- Labels: Parlophone; Warner Music
- Website: thomasjackmusic.com

Tom Jack Johnston, (better known by his stage name Thomas Jack) is an Australian DJ, record producer and musician. He is noted for the "tropical house" subgenre, and coined the term in 2013.

== Early life ==
Johnston grew up on a dairy farm in a small rural town in New South Wales before moving to Sydney to enroll in a music production school. Speaking in an interview, he said "I grew up on this massive dairy farm with 2,000 to 3,000 cows, and we would milk them every morning and afternoon. That's what I did growing up, pretty much everything to being a farmer. After that, I ended up moving to Sydney to go to school."

Using the PlayStation game eJay he became involved in the production of dance music. He said "I kept learning and started DJing and I always really enjoyed it. You always have that dream of thinking, that'd be so cool if I could do this for a living and you can never expect what's going to happen to you". Johnston eventually moved to Ableton after his father gifted him the software. He previously used a number of stage names while growing up such as Dirty-D, Bassics, Tommy and Tom Foolery but they were never used professionally.

== Background ==
Johnston refers to his summery, laid-back dance tracks as tropical house. Inspired by deep house as well as acoustic rock and jam bands, his tracks heavily feature live instruments, particularly saxophone, flute, piano, and guitar, and generally have a relaxed, sunny, uplifting feel. His tracks often feature samples of speeches. Speaking about his involvement in the genre, Johnston said "I just wanna be Thomas Jack and do my thing. I fear that, in a year, I'm gonna be jammed in this corner. And everyone's gonna know me as just that".

== Musical career ==
=== 2013–14 ===
Johnston's first manager, Myles Shear, discovered him on SoundCloud and flew him to Miami.

Johnston began a podcast mix series called Tropical House, which featured guest mixes by Felix Jaehn, Bakermat, Robin Schulz, and others. He became well known across EDM websites for his original tracks such as "Symphony" and "The Final Speech" as well as his remixes of popular artists such as Of Monsters & Men and OneRepublic and house producers like Adrian Lux.

His busy touring schedule brought him to clubs around the globe, causing Johnston to refer to himself as "homeless" but he has spent a considerable amount of time in the United States, particularly in Florida. After devoting much of 2014 to remixes (including his take on Gabriel Rios' "Gold") and live gigs, he released a new single, "Rivers".

=== 2015 ===
In August 2015, Johnston went on the We Are Your Friends movie tour along with several other artists such as Hook n Sling, MAKJ, SNBRN, Anna Lunoe and Michael Woods. Johnston announced the Tropical Express Tour in which he toured with Bag Raiders, Bixel Boys, Felix Jaehn and several others.

On 30 October 2015, Johnston released his debut single "Rivers" featuring Norwegian singers Nico & Vinz. The single peaked fourth on the Belgian chart, fifty-first on the Dutch chart and sixteenth on the Norwegian chart. On 26 November 2015, an official music video was uploaded to Thomas Jack's YouTube channel.

When asked about his plans on launching a tropical house record label, Johnston said "Maybe, but I'm trying to figure out what music I want to make still. There's a lot of different stuff I want to make. I just want to get there first. I discovered so much amazing music at Burning Man that really inspired me to do some different things. It's hard to change straight away. I got some different ideas for what I want to do. But they're a bit too weird to change so I'm just gonna keep cruising. I've got an album to finish at the moment which is pretty cool".

=== 2016 ===
Johnston had planned to release his debut studio album in 2016. He said "I'm just starting to get into it now, so I'm not sure. I have some new singles, but we're just trying to figure out the correct release dates and everything. I've had such a hectic tour schedule over the summer, so it really slowed down my production. But I have a bit of time off now, so I can focus. I'm looking forward to it".

On 8 July 2016, he released his second single "Rise Up" with English singer Jasmine Thompson. The single peaked fourteenth in Belgium. An official music video was uploaded to Jasmine Thompson's YouTube channel.

== Legacy ==
He began using the term "tropical house" somewhat jokingly, but it stuck, and international producers such as Kygo and Klingande soon became associated with the subgenre.

Speaking about tropical house, Johnston said "This genre has impacted on commercial radio. This time next year, tropical house will not be the same. I wanna still hold my name as an artist and not become way, way, way commercial. I don't wanna be limited to the name of a genre".

Johnston introduced Kygo to his former manager Myles Shear which has helped to launch the careers of Kygo and Klingande.

When asked about how he sees himself in the genre, Johnston said "I just was always doing my thing – it really wasn't anything planned. But it's cool, I like it. The interesting thing that I want to know is what's going to happen to it in the next year, you know? It needs to be taken to the next level".

== Discography ==
=== Singles ===
Title	Year	Peak chart positions					Certifications	Album
Title	Year	BEL (BU)	NL	NOR	US		Certifications	Album
Title	Year	BEL (BU)	NL	NOR	Hot	Digital	Certifications	Album
"Rivers" (featuring Nico & Vinz)	2015	4	51	16	44	44		Non-album singles
"Rise Up" (with Jasmine Thompson)	2016	14	—	—	—	—		Non-album singles
"—" denotes a recording that did not chart or was not released in that territory.

== Music videos ==
- Thomas Jack – Rivers (feat. Nico & Vinz)
- Thomas Jack & Jasmine Thompson – Rise Up
