= List of number-one albums of 2014 (Canada) =

These are the Canadian number-one albums of 2014. The chart is compiled by Nielsen Soundscan and published by Jam! Canoe, issued every Sunday. The chart also appears in Billboard magazine as Top Canadian Albums.

Note that Billboard publishes charts with an issue date approximately 7–10 days in advance.

== Number-one albums ==
Key
| † | Indicates best-performing album of 2014 |

| Issue date | Album | Artist(s) | Ref. |
|---|---|---|---|
| January 4 | A Christmas Gift to You | Johnny Reid | |
| January 11 | The Marshall Mathers LP 2 | Eminem | |
| January 18 | Beyoncé | Beyoncé | |
| January 25 | Beyoncé | Beyoncé | |
| February 1 | High Hopes | Bruce Springsteen | |
| February 8 | Grammy Nominees 2014 | Various artists | |
| February 15 | Grammy Nominees 2014 | Various artists | |
| February 22 | Unorthodox Jukebox | Bruno Mars | |
| March 1 | The Outsiders | Eric Church | |
| March 8 | Frozen † | Soundtrack | |
| March 15 | Oxymoron | Schoolboy Q | |
| March 22 | Serge Fiori | Serge Fiori | |
| March 29 | Serge Fiori | Serge Fiori | |
| April 5 | Frozen † | Soundtrack | |
| April 12 | Frozen † | Soundtrack | |
| April 19 | She Looks So Perfect (EP) | 5 Seconds of Summer | |
| April 26 | Frozen † | Soundtrack | |
| May 3 | Frozen † | Soundtrack | |
| May 10 | Frozen † | Soundtrack | |
| May 17 | Frozen † | Soundtrack | |
| May 24 | Shine On | Sarah McLachlan | |
| May 31 | Turn Blue | The Black Keys | |
| June 7 | Ghost Stories | Coldplay | |
| June 14 | Where I Belong | Bobby Bazini | |
| June 21 | Platinum | Miranda Lambert | |
| June 28 | Lazaretto | Jack White | |
| July 5 | Ultraviolence | Lana Del Rey | |
| July 12 | x | Ed Sheeran | |
| July 19 | x | Ed Sheeran | |
| July 26 | 1000 Forms of Fear | Sia | |
| August 2 | The Black Market | Rise Against | |
| August 9 | 5 Seconds of Summer | 5 Seconds of Summer | |
| August 16 | Hypnotic Eye | Tom Petty and the Heartbreakers | |
| August 23 | Guardians of the Galaxy: Awesome Mix Vol. 1 | Soundtrack | |
| August 30 | Guardians of the Galaxy: Awesome Mix Vol. 1 | Soundtrack | |
| September 6 | Blacc Hollywood | Wiz Khalifa | |
| September 13 | My Everything | Ariana Grande | |
| September 20 | V | Maroon 5 | |
| September 27 | V | Maroon 5 | |
| October 4 | Partners | Barbra Streisand | |
| October 11 | Popular Problems | Leonard Cohen | |
| October 18 | Tracks of My Years | Bryan Adams | |
| October 25 | Old Boots, New Dirt | Jason Aldean | |
| November 1 | Rose Ave. | You+Me | |
| November 8 | .5: The Gray Chapter | Slipknot | |
| November 15 | 1989 | Taylor Swift | |
| November 22 | 1989 | Taylor Swift | |
| November 29 | The Endless River | Pink Floyd | |
| December 6 | Four | One Direction | |
| December 13 | Shady XV | Various artists | |
| December 20 | Rock or Bust | AC/DC | |
| December 27 | 1989 | Taylor Swift | |

== See also ==
- List of Canadian Hot 100 number-one singles of 2014
