= Rivers (Thomas Jack song) =

Single by Thomas Jack
- Released: 10 July 2015
- Recorded: 2015
- Genre: Tropical house; R&B
- Length: 3:27
- Label: Parlophone
- Songwriters: Tim Woodcock; Dennis Bierbrodt; Jürgen Dohr; Guido Kramer; Jack McManus; Thomas Jack
- Producers: Thomas Jack; JUNKX

Thomas Jack singles chronology
"Rivers" (2015)	"Rise Up" (2016)

Nico & Vinz singles chronology
"That’s How You Know" (2015)	"Rivers" (2015)	"Love You Right" (2015)

Single featuring Nico & Vinz

"Rivers" is a 2015 song by the Australian DJ and record producer Thomas Jack. Upon release, Jack said, "I’m really excited and honored to be releasing ‘Rivers’. It’s been a while since I released new music, and this track is very much in line with my musical direction right now." The track was released on 10 July 2015. It peaked at number 16 on VG-lista, the Norwegian Official Singles Chart. The song features uncredited vocals from Tim Woodcock and Jack McManus.

Remixes were released on 29 October 2015.

A later version was released on 30 October 2015 by Thomas Jack featuring Norwegian R&B duo Nico & Vinz.

== Sound ==
Bianca Gracie of Idolator said, "It starts off with a charming acoustic guitar-flicked melody and soon rushes in with velvety vocals and shimmering synths that has "Summer" written all over it."

== Music video ==
The official music video was released on 26 November 2015. It features Nico & Vinz, although they do not appear in the video. It features a young couple backpacking through a serene country all the while experiencing love, enchantment, freedom and bitterness in the end.

== Track listings ==
Solo version

1. "Rivers" – 3:27

Remixes single

1. "Rivers" (Sam Feldt & De Hofner Remix) – 4:11
2. "Rivers" (Hugel Remix) – 4:15
3. "Rivers" (Leon Lour Remix) – 4:39

Featuring Nico & Vinz

1. "Rivers" – 3:27

== Charts ==
Chart performance for "Rivers"
Chart (2015–2016)	Peak position
Netherlands (Dutch Top 40)	24
Netherlands (Single Top 100)	51
Norway (VG-lista)	16
Poland Airplay (ZPAV)	7
Poland (Polish Airplay New)	3
Sweden Heatseeker (Sverigetopplistan)	6

== Certifications ==
Certifications for "Rivers"
Region	Certification	Certified units/sales
Norway (IFPI Norway)	Platinum	40,000^{‡}
^{‡} Sales+streaming figures based on certification alone.
