= Counting Stars =

2013 single by OneRepublic

Single by OneRepublic

from the album Native
- Released: June 14, 2013
- Recorded: August 2012
- Studio: Black Rock Studio Santorini (Santorini, Greece); Patriot Studios (Denver, CO)
- Genre: Pop rock; folk rock; folk pop
- Length: 4:17
- Label: Mosley; Interscope
- Songwriter: Ryan Tedder
- Producers: Tedder; Noel Zancanella

OneRepublic singles chronology
"If I Lose Myself" (2013)	"Counting Stars" (2013)	"Something I Need" (2013)

Audio sample
- file; help

Music video
- "Counting Stars" on YouTube

"Counting Stars" is a song by the American pop rock band OneRepublic from their third studio album, Native (2013). The song was written by lead singer Ryan Tedder, and produced by Tedder and Noel Zancanella. It was released as the album's second single on June 14, 2013.

The song is the band's most successful single, reaching number one in many countries including Canada and the United Kingdom, number two in the United States, and top ten in 20 countries. It has sold over 1 million copies in the United Kingdom.

The song's accompanying music video, directed by James Lees, features the band performing in the ground floor of a building beneath an ongoing church congregation on the upper floor. As of September 2025, the video has received 4.25 billion views on YouTube.

In September 2023, OneRepublic released a reimagined version of the song, featuring a slower tempo and a new backing track.

== Background and composition ==
Ryan Tedder stated that "'Counting Stars' came about [in August 2012] as an idea. It was probably the most versions of any song[...]to get it right". He also called it "one of [his] two favorite songs on the [Native] album". Tedder started writing "Counting Stars" while waiting for Beyoncé to turn up to a studio session, about a month after starting to write "Love Runs Out". In an interview with the Official Charts Company, Tedder said, "I had the idea for Counting Stars originally in the summer of 2012 when I was in the Hamptons. I was working in the largest house I've ever stepped foot in, which was being rented by Jay-Z and Beyoncé. I was in the middle of working on my most recent album with OneRepublic, Native, and during that time I was determined not to work with any other artists. I broke the promise because I also did sessions that year with Beyoncé. When Jay-Z and Beyoncé invite you to stay with them in the Hamptons, you don't say no!" He continued: "I was out there for about five days and on the second day I woke up early and I started combing through the internet, searching for stuff that would inspire me for Beyoncé. I ended up coming across this weird song that had this indigenous folk sound to it that just struck me like lightning. I didn't like the verses or lyrics, but I loved the feel and movement of it. That ended up inspiring Counting Stars. I debated playing it for Beyoncé and putting it forward for her album, but it didn't feel like a song Beyoncé would record. I immediately came up with the chorus idea, went home and for the next three months finished the Native album."

"Counting Stars" is a folk pop and pop rock song. Ricardo Baca of The Denver Post said that the song is "an extremely effective (and infectious) song — with Tedder's polished pop hijacking a folk song, and a little R&B attitude in there as well." The band explained that the song is about "laying in bed awake at night when you're stressed out of your mind, thinking 'How are we gonna make ends meet? How are we gonna pay the bills?' You know, all those things you wanna do with your life – how are we gonna make them work? How's this actually gonna happen or come to pass? So, instead of counting sheep, we're counting stars." Sheet music for "Counting Stars" is in the key of C♯ minor with a tempo of 107.6 beats per minute before increasing to 122 beats per minute, following a chord progression of C♯m-E-B-A. Tedder's vocals span from a low of B_{2} to a high of C♯_{5}.

== Music video ==
The music video was filmed on May 10, 2013, in New Orleans, Louisiana, and premiered on May 31, 2013. The video features the band performing the song in a gloomy ground floor of a building surrounded by hanging light bulbs, interspersed with scenes of several people in a religious revival service on the upper floor, dancing along with the song. At the end of the video, the ceiling collapses, causing one of the people in the service to fall through the floor into the room the band is performing in. The video also shows clips of an alligator crawling through the ground floor.

The video became the first music video by a band in history to reach 1 billion views, doing so on November 2, 2015. It has received over 4.2 billion views and 18 million likes on YouTube, and, as of February 2026, is the 20th most viewed video on the site.

== Commercial performance ==
"Counting Stars" debuted at number 32 on the Billboard Hot 100 on July 6, 2013. The song peaked at number two on January 18, 2014, and stayed there for two weeks behind "Timber" by Pitbull, featuring Kesha. The song spent 25 consecutive weeks in the top ten, and finished fifth for the most total weeks on the Hot 100 after spending 68 weeks on the chart. It is tied with "Apologize" as OneRepublic's highest-peaking single in the United States, and is their third US top-ten hit. The song has sold over 5.3 million copies in the US as of December 2014 and was certified eighteen-times Platinum by RIAA.

In Canada, the song set the record for the longest climb to number one on the Canadian Hot 100, reaching number one on its 34th week on the chart on February 8, 2014. The song has topped the charts in Canada, Finland, Israel, Poland, Slovakia, and the United Kingdom, and charted within the top ten in 20 countries, including attaining top five placements in Australia, Germany, Ireland, and New Zealand. In the United Kingdom, "Counting Stars" spent 34 consecutive weeks inside the top 40. On October 11, 2014, the Official Charts Company confirmed that "Counting Stars" had sold 1 million copies in the UK. On February 28, 2022, Live Nation Entertainment confirmed that the song had sold 41 million copies worldwide.

== Track listing ==
CD single

1. "Counting Stars" – 4:18
2. "Counting Stars" (Lovelife remix) – 3:55

Other Versions

- 7th Heaven Club Mix - 7:15
- 7th Heaven Radio Edit - 3:14
- 2023 Version - 3:52

== Credits and personnel ==
Recording

- Recorded at Black Rock Studio Santorini, Santorini, Greece, and Patriot Studios, Denver, Colorado
- Mastered at Sterling Sound, New York

Personnel

- Songwriting – Ryan Tedder
- Production – Ryan Tedder, Noel Zancanella
- Engineering – Smith Carlson
- Assistant engineering – Matthew Tryba
- Harp – HarpEri
- Backing vocals – Bobbie Gordon, Brent Kutzle, Zach Filkins, David McGlohon
- Mixing – Joe Zook
- Assistant mix engineering – Ryan Lipman
- Mastering – Chris Gehringer, Will Quinnell

== Charts ==
=== Weekly charts ===
Weekly chart performance
Chart (2013–2014)	Peak position
Australia (ARIA)	2
Austria (Ö3 Austria Top 40)	4
Belgium (Ultratop 50 Flanders)	22
Belgium Dance (Ultratop Flanders)	50
Belgium (Ultratop 50 Wallonia)	3
Belgium Dance (Ultratop Wallonia)	15
Brazil Hot 100 (Billboard)	63
Brazil Hot Pop Songs	31
Canada Hot 100 (Billboard)	1
Canada AC (Billboard)	1
Canada CHR/Top 40 (Billboard)	2
Canada Hot AC (Billboard)	1
Czech Republic Airplay (ČNS IFPI)	2
Czech Republic Singles Digital (ČNS IFPI)	10
Denmark (Tracklisten)	3
Finland (Suomen virallinen lista)	1
France (SNEP)	7
Germany (GfK)	3
Greece Digital Songs (Billboard Greece Digital Songs)	4
Hungary (Rádiós Top 40)	6
Hungary (Single Top 40)	3
Ireland (IRMA)	2
Israel International Airplay (Media Forest)	1
Italy (FIMI)	8
Luxembourg Digital Song Sales (Billboard)	5
Mexico Airplay (Billboard)	1
Netherlands (Dutch Top 40)	3
Netherlands (Single Top 100)	7
New Zealand (Recorded Music NZ)	2
Norway (VG-lista)	4
Poland Airplay (ZPAV)	1
Romania (Airplay 100)	32
Russia Airplay (TopHit)	51
Scottish Singles Sales (Official Charts)	1
Slovakia Airplay (ČNS IFPI)	1
Slovakia Singles Digital (ČNS IFPI)	46
Slovenia Airplay (SloTop50)	4
Spain (Promusicae)	4
Sweden (Sverigetopplistan)	6
Switzerland (Schweizer Hitparade)	9
UK Singles (Official Charts)	1
Ukraine Airplay (TopHit)	22
US Billboard Hot 100	2
US Adult Alternative Airplay (Billboard)	4
US Adult Contemporary (Billboard)	1
US Adult Pop Airplay (Billboard)	1
US Dance Club Songs (Billboard)	30
US Dance Airplay (Billboard)	9
US Latin Airplay (Billboard)	32
US Pop Airplay (Billboard)	1
US Rhythmic Airplay (Billboard)	22
Venezuela Pop/Rock Airplay (Record Report)	19

Chart (2021–2026)	Peak position
Global 200 (Billboard)	79
Lithuania Airplay (TopHit)	88
Luxembourg (Billboard)	12
Slovakia Singles Digital (ČNS IFPI)	86

=== Year-end charts ===
Annual chart rankings
Chart (2013)	Position
Australia (ARIA)	8
Austria (Ö3 Austria Top 40)	32
Canada (Canadian Hot 100)	70
France (SNEP)	162
Germany (Official German Charts)	21
Hungary (Rádiós Top 40)	38
Ireland (IRMA)	13
Netherlands (Dutch Top 40)	154
New Zealand (Recorded Music NZ)	11
Slovenia (SloTop50)	5
Sweden (Sverigetopplistan)	39
Switzerland (Schweizer Hitparade)	38
UK Singles (Official Charts Company)	9
US Billboard Hot 100	63
US Adult Top 40 (Billboard)	26

Chart (2014)	Position
Belgium (Ultratop Flanders)	76
Belgium (Ultratop Wallonia)	13
Brazil (Crowley)	74
Canada (Canadian Hot 100)	3
France (SNEP)	21
Hungary (Single Top 40)	49
Italy (FIMI)	13
Netherlands (Dutch Top 40)	12
Netherlands (Single Top 100)	30
Russia Airplay (TopHit)	163
Slovenia (SloTop50)	28
Spain (PROMUSICAE)	31
Sweden (Sverigetopplistan)	38
Switzerland (Schweizer Hitparade)	66
UK Singles (Official Charts Company)	44
US Billboard Hot 100	5
US Adult Contemporary (Billboard)	2
US Adult Top 40 (Billboard)	6
US Adult Alternative Songs (Billboard)	42
US Dance/Mix Show Airplay (Billboard)	49
US Mainstream Top 40 (Billboard)	2

Chart (2021)	Position
Global 200 (Billboard)	136
Portugal (AFP)	191

Chart (2022)	Position
Australia (ARIA)	89
Global 200 (Billboard)	89

Chart (2023)	Position
Australia (ARIA)	84
Hungary (Rádiós Top 40)	82
Global 200 (Billboard)	96

Chart (2024)	Position
Global 200 (Billboard)	76
Hungary (Rádiós Top 40)	98

Chart (2025)	Position
Belgium (Ultratop 50 Flanders)	174
Global 200 (Billboard)	80
Switzerland (Schweizer Hitparade)	55

=== Decade-end charts ===
Decennium chart rankings
Chart (2010–2019)	Position
Australia (ARIA)	32
UK Singles (Official Charts Company)	39
US Billboard Hot 100	39

=== All-time charts ===
All-time chart rankings
Chart	Position
US Adult Top 40 (Billboard)	5
US Billboard Pop Songs (2012–2017)	16
US Billboard Hot 100 (1958–2018)	155

== Certifications and sales ==
Certifications and sales
Region	Certification	Certified units/sales
Australia (ARIA)	21× Platinum	1,470,000^{‡}
Austria (IFPI Austria)	4× Platinum	120,000^{*}
Belgium (BRMA)	Gold	15,000^{*}
Brazil (Pro-Música Brasil)	6× Diamond	1,500,000^{‡}
Canada (Music Canada)	Diamond	800,000^{‡}
Denmark (IFPI Danmark)	4× Platinum	360,000^{‡}
France	—	60,300
Germany (BVMI)	Diamond	1,000,000^{‡}
Italy (FIMI)	5× Platinum	500,000^{‡}
Mexico (AMPROFON)	2× Platinum	120,000^{*}
Netherlands (NVPI)	2× Platinum	40,000^{^}
New Zealand (RMNZ)	9× Platinum	270,000^{‡}
Portugal (AFP)	5× Platinum	125,000^{‡}
Spain (Promusicae)	4× Platinum	240,000^{‡}
Sweden (GLF)	5× Platinum	200,000^{‡}
Switzerland (IFPI Switzerland)	2× Platinum	60,000^{‡}
United Kingdom (BPI)	7× Platinum	4,200,000^{‡}
United States (RIAA)	18× Platinum	18,000,000^{‡}
Streaming
Denmark (IFPI Danmark)	3× Platinum	5,400,000^{†}
Japan (RIAJ)	Gold	50,000,000^{†}
Spain (Promusicae)	Platinum	8,000,000^{†}
Summaries
Worldwide	—	41,000,000
^{*} Sales figures based on certification alone.^{^} Shipments figures based on certification alone.^{‡} Sales+streaming figures based on certification alone.^{†} Streaming-only figures based on certification alone.

== Release history ==
Release dates and formats
Region	Date	Format	Label	Ref.
Germany	June 14, 2013	CD single	Universal	
United States	October 8, 2013	Mainstream airplay	Interscope	
Italy	October 18, 2013	Radio impact	Universal	

== See also ==
- List of best-selling singles in Australia
- List of best-selling singles in the United States
- List of highest-certified digital singles in the United States
- List of Billboard Adult Contemporary number ones of 2014
- List of Canadian Hot 100 number-one singles of 2014
- List of UK Singles Chart number ones of 2014
- List of million-selling singles in the United Kingdom
