= William Wiik Larsen =

Norwegian record producer

- Also known as: Will IDAP, Nasty Kutt, Will/William Larsen
- Born: September 15, 1986 (age 40); Oslo, Norway
- Genres: Pop, hip hop, country music, world music, Reggae, rock music, electronic dance music
- Occupations: Record producer & songwriter
- Years active: 2005–present
- Label: IDAP Music

William Wiik Larsen, also known as Will IDAP and Nasty kutt, is a Norwegian Grammy-nominated record producer, songwriter and multi-instrumentalist based out of Los Angeles, California. He has crafted several global and US hits. Notable records include "Am I Wrong" for Nico & Vinz, "H.O.L.Y." for Florida Georgia Line, "Play That Song" for Train, "That's Not True" for Skip Marley, "Gatekeeper" for Jessie Reyez, "Darkside" for Alan Walker and "Stay" for Kygo.

== Early life ==
Larsen was born in Oslo, Norway. His father was a professional musician and his mother a singer. Growing up in a musical family, he was exposed to instruments, drum machines, keyboards and turntables from an early age. At the age of 6 he started playing drums in the school band. He later moved on to study drums and percussion at the Norwegian Academy of Music (Norges Musikkhøyskole) at the age of 10. At the age of 12 he started dj'ing and programming music.

== DJ & artist career (2001-2012) ==
At age 14, Larsen started touring and competing as a DJ under the alias Nasty Kutt, he won the Norwegian DMC National DJ Championships 2005 and 2006, to go on to represent Norway in the World finals (DMC World DJ Championships).

He has done several appearances as a dj/artist among others most notably In 2011, launching the single 'Min Ting' at VG-lista Topp 20 in a collaboration with IDAP Music and Universal Music, featuring Norwegian artists Vinni from Paperboys, Yosef from Madcon, Lars Vaular og OnklP, and Swedish artists Timbuktu & Promoe.

== Music production & songwriting career ==
=== Early career (2001-2012) ===
Larsen started producing songs in Oslo’s urban music scene in the early 2000s. After he started to gain traction as a dj, he got his first local commercial break along with Norwegian band Karpe Diem, producing a string of singles, ‘Vestkantsvartinga’, ’Byduer I Dur’ and ‘Krølla 50 lapp y’all’ around the late 2000s. He continued to work as producer in the Norwegian and Scandinavian music markets, earning 21 IFPI (International Federation of the Phonographic Industry) Certifications, 5 of them being multi-platinum.

In 2009, he produced the single ‘City Lights’ for Redman & Methodman feat UGK from the album ‘Blackout! 2’, securing him his first US major label placement. The Def Jam/Universalrelease debuted at No. 7 on the Billboard200 album chart.

=== International career (2013-present) ===
In 2013, he reconnected and worked closely with duo Nico&Vinz, developing the distinct sound for their single ‘Am I Wrong’ and their album ‘Black Star Elephant’. producing and co-writing 10 out of the 14 songs on the album. ’Am I Wrong’ entered several other international singles charts. In the United States, the song peaked at number four on the Billboard Hot 100, becoming the highest-charting song by a Norwegian artist since a-ha's "Take On Me" in 1985. The song reached its first million sales mark in the US in June 2014, and its second million in September 2014, having sold 2.2 million by the year's end. In the United Kingdom, the song peaked at number one, making ‘Am I Wrong’ the first song by a Norwegian act to top the UK Singles Chart since A-ha's "The Sun Always Shines on T.V." in 1986.

Late 2013 Larsen relocated to Los Angeles and signed a worldwide Joint Venture deal with IDAP Music & BMG Rights Management.

In the years to follow, Larsen played a part in several US and international successes.

In 2016, he co-wrote the song ‘HO.L.Y’ for the American duo Florida Georgia Line, which earned the spot as the highest charting country song that year, and the 5th charting country song of the decade in the US. The song also won BMI ‘Country song of the year ‘.

He then teamed up with singer Pat Monahan from the band Train to work on their album ‘A Girl A Bottle A Boat’, playing part of 6 out of the 11 songs on the album. The album debuted at No. 8 on the Billboard 200 albums chart on its first week of release. The single ‘Play That Song’ co-written and produced by Larsen, received international certifications in addition to being 2xplatinum in the US.

The same year, he also co-wrote and co-produced Kygo’s single ‘Stay’ featuring Maty Noyes, receiving several international platinum and gold certifications.

In 2017, Larsen co-wrote and produced the song ‘Gatekeeper’ along with Jessie Reyez for her EP ‘Kiddo’, Gatekeeper was released as a short film, which addressed sexism and exploitation in the music industry. It specifically was based on her experience with music producer Noel "Detail" Fisher, who was accused of sexual misconduct by multiple women, including artist Bebe Rexha. In 2018 ‘Gatekeeper’ received a MTV Music Video Awards nomination in the category ‘Video With A Message’ and a won Juno Award 'Video Of The Year'.

He then co-wrote Alan Walker’s single ‘Darkside’.

In 2019, Larsen produced and co-wrote Skip Marley’s ‘That’s Not True’ feat Damian Marley. The song was the first single of off the EP ‘Higher Place’ which was nominated for a Grammy award in the category ‘Best Reggae Album’ at the 2020 Grammy Awards.

He also worked closely with artist Akon in the period between 2016 and 2019, yielding the unofficial single 'Letter To My Son' released in 2020.

== Media appearances and mentoring ==
Larsen was featured on episode #275 of Dave Pensado's 'Pensado's Place', he has appeared as a panelist several times at the ASCAP Expo in LA. He appeared twice as a coach and guest judge on the Norwegian hit show "Stjernekamp". Larsen has worked with the organization Music Norway and has mentored at the Norwegian music university LIMPI to support aspiring Norwegian producers and songwriters.

== Selected discography ==
Year	Artist	Song	Album	Credit
2023	Ty Dolla $ign & Chris Brown	"Motion Remix"	Single	Producer & Writer
2023	Ty Dolla $ign	"Motion"	Single	Producer & Writer
2022	Andrea Berg & Justin Jesso	"I'll Be There"	Single	Producer
2022	Benson Boone	"Work Of Art"	Walk Me Home...	Producer & Writer
2022	Clinton Kane	"Keep It To Yourself"	Single	Producer & Writer
2022	Jennifer Lopez	"Church"	Marry Me (2022 Film)	Writer
2021	Camila Cabello, Nicholas Galitzine, Idina Menzel	"Am I Wrong"	Cinderella (2021 American film)	Writer
2020	Akon	"Letter To My Son"	Ain't No Peace	Producer & Writer
2019	Scotty Sire	"Words"	Single	Producer & Writer
2019	Strawhatz	"POWER UP!"	Single	Producer & Writer
2019	Strawhatz	"Drop The Beat"	Single	Producer & Writer
2019	Running Lights	"Into U"	Single	Producer & Writer
2019	American Authors feat Beau Young Prince	"Champion"	Single	Producer & Writer
2019	Skip Marley feat Damian Marley	"Thats Not True"	Single	Producer & Writer
2019	Running Lights	"Not In Love"	Single	Producer & Writer
2019	Running Lights	"Speechless"	Single	Producer & Writer
2019	Madcon	"Callin You"	Single	Producer & Writer
2018	Alan Walker feat Au/Ra & Tomine Harket	"Darkside"	Single	Writer
2018	Maty Noyes	"Boys Like you"	Love Songs From A Lolita EP	Producer
2018	AJ Mitchell	"High Like You"	Hopeful EP	Producer & Writer
2018	Train feat Cam & Travie McCoy	"Call Me Sir"	Single	Producer & Writer
2017	Jessie Reyez	"Gatekeeper"	Kiddo	Producer & Writer
2017	Train	"You Better Believe"	a girl a bottle a boat	Producer & Writer
2017	Train	"Lost and Found"	a girl a bottle a boat	Producer & Writer
2017	Train	"Valentine"	a girl a bottle a boat	Producer & Writer
2016	Train	"Working Girl"	a girl a bottle a boat	Producer & Writer
2016	Train	"Lottery"	a girl a bottle a boat	Producer & Writer
2016	Keke Palmer	"Figure You Out"	Single	Producer & Writer
2016	Maty Noyes	"In My Mind"	Single	Producer & Writer
2016	Nano	"Day I'm Gone"	Single	Producer & Writer
2016	Kevin Hart, Akon	"Give It Back"	Single	Producer & Writer
2016	Train	"Play That Song"	Single	Producer & Writer
2016	Tish Hyman	"Lesbehonest"	"Dedicated to"	Producer
2016	Tish Hyman	"Absolutely"	"Dedicated to"	Producer & Writer
2016	Tish Hyman Feat Ty Dolla Sign & Fabolous	"Dreams"	"Dedicated to"	Producer
2016	Tish Hyman	"4 Letter Word"	"Dedicated to"	Producer & Writer
2016	Broiler	"Daydream"	Single	Producer & Writer
2016	Florida Georgia Line	"H.O.L.Y."	Single	Writer
2016	Broiler feat Bekuh Boom	"Money"	Single	Producer & Writer
2015	Tish Hyman	"Home For Christmas"	"Dedicated to"	Producer & Writer
2015	Kygo feat Maty Noyes	"Stay"	Single	Producer & Writer
2015	Nano	"Perfect Melody"	Single	Producer & Writer
2015	Broiler feat Tish Hyman	"Fly By Night"	Single	Producer & Writer
2015	Nano	"Lion"	Single	Producer & Writer
2015	Tish Hyman	"Subway Art"	"Dedicated to"	Producer
2014	Nico & Vinz feat. Emmanuel Jal	"Find A Way"	"The Good Lie" Movie Soundtrack	Producer & Writer
2014	Jessie J	"Personal"	Sweet Talker	Producer & Writer
2014	Nico & Vinz	"Am I Wrong"	Black Star Elephant	Writer
2014	Nico & Vinz	"Know What I'm Not"	Black Star Elephant	Producer & Writer
2014	Nico & Vinz	"Miracles"	Black Star Elephant	Producer & Writer
2014	Nico & Vinz feat Ntirelang Berman	"My Melody"	Black Star Elephant	Producer & Writer
2014	Nico & Vinz	"Another Day"	Black Star Elephant	Producer & Writer
2014	Nico & Vinz	"People"	Black Star Elephant	Producer & Writer
2014	Nico & Vinz	"Imagine"	Black Star Elephant	Producer & Writer
2014	Nico & Vinz feat Ntirelang Berman	"Homeless"	Black Star Elephant	Producer & Writer
2014	Nico & Vinz	"When The Day Comes"	Black Star Elephant	Producer & Writer
2013	Dirt Nasty(Simon Rex) feat Too $hort	"Bang Her"	Palatial	Producer
2013	Dirt Nasty(Simon Rex)	"Threesome"	Palatial	Producer & Writer
2012	Angel Haze	"CHI (Need To Know)"	Reservation	Producer
2012	Three Loco	"Beer"	Three Loco EP	Producer
2012	Three Loco	"Make Em Wait"	Three Loco EP	Producer
2012	Envy	"One Song"	The Magic Soup And The Bittersweet Faces	Producer & Writer
2010	Madcon	"Walk Out The Door"	Contraband	Producer & Writer
2010	Madcon	"Be Mine"	Contraband	Producer & Writer
2009	Method Man & Redman feat UGK	"City Lights"	Blackout! 2	Producer
2008	Karpe Diem	"Krølla 50'lapp y'all"	Fire Vegger	Producer
2008	Karpe Diem	"Byduer I Dur"	Fire Vegger	Producer
