= Play That Song (Train song) =

Single by Train

from the album A Girl, a Bottle, a Boat
- Released: September 29, 2016
- Length: 4:03 (Album version); 3:20 (Radio edit)
- Label: Columbia
- Songwriters: Patrick Monahan; William Wiik Larsen; Frank Loesser; Hoagy Carmichael
- Producer: William Wiik Larsen

Train singles chronology
"Give It All" (2015)	"Play That Song" (2016)	"Drink Up" (2017)

Music video
- "Play That Song" on YouTube

"Play That Song" is a song by American rock band Train. It was released on September 29, 2016, as the lead single from their tenth studio album A Girl, a Bottle, a Boat (2017). The song peaked at number 41 on the US Billboard Hot 100. It has been certified double platinum by the ARIA and the RIAA, and gold by Music Canada and the British Phonographic Industry.

== Composition ==
The song interpolates the melody of "Heart and Soul", written by Hoagy Carmichael and Frank Loesser. They are credited as writers, alongside Train lead singer Patrick Monahan and producer William Wiik Larsen.

The song's lyrics reference "Hey Mr. DJ", a phrase that was popularized in the 2000s with such songs as "Music" by Madonna and "Pon de Replay" by Rihanna.

== Music video ==
A music video to accompany the release of "Play That Song" was first released onto YouTube on November 18, 2016. It shows Monahan dancing through Los Angeles on a warm sunny day, accompanied by many friendly strangers. At one point, Monahan dances on a large piano keyboard, evoking a scene from Big. The video was shot at Los Angeles' Grand Park. At the end of the video, Monahan is shown walking into a building with signage indicating that it is "KTRN Radio Station"; over the glass entry door is stenciled "KTRN Premium Radio". Then just before a reprise of the song's chorus, a radio announcer, heard through a large boombox being held up by the crowd, says that "Play That Song" will be played due to "..all the requests coming in". The call letters reference an actual, active radio station, 104.5 KTRN, known, quite appropriately to the video as K-Train; the only anomaly is that the station is located far from the video's Los Angeles setting in Pine Bluff, Arkansas.

== Charts ==
=== Weekly charts ===
Weekly chart performance for "Play That Song"
Chart (2016–2017)	Peak position
Australia (ARIA)	8
Austria (Ö3 Austria Top 40)	26
Canada Hot 100 (Billboard)	69
Hungary (Rádiós Top 40)	6
Hungary (Single Top 40)	31
Scottish Singles Sales (Official Charts)	7
UK Singles (Official Charts)	21
US Billboard Hot 100	41
US Adult Contemporary (Billboard)	6
US Adult Pop Airplay (Billboard)	6
US Pop Airplay (Billboard)	27

=== Year-end charts ===
2017 year-end chart performance for "Play That Song"
Chart (2017)	Position
Australia (ARIA)	91
Hungary (Rádiós Top 40)	87
US Adult Contemporary (Billboard)	12
US Adult Top 40 (Billboard)	19
US Digital Songs (Billboard)	44

== Certifications ==
Certifications for "Play That Song"
Region	Certification	Certified units/sales
Australia (ARIA)	2× Platinum	140,000^{‡}
Canada (Music Canada)	Platinum	80,000^{‡}
New Zealand (RMNZ)	Gold	15,000^{‡}
United Kingdom (BPI)	Gold	400,000^{‡}
United States (RIAA)	3× Platinum	3,000,000^{‡}
^{‡} Sales+streaming figures based on certification alone.

== Release history ==
Release dates for "Play That Song"
Region	Date	Format	Label
United Kingdom	September 29, 2016	Digital download	Columbia Records
