= Lift Me Up (David Guetta song) =

Single

Song by David Guetta featuring Nico & Vinz and Ladysmith Black Mambazo

from the album Listen
- Released: 24 November 2014
- Recorded: 2014
- Genre: Progressive house
- Length: 3:59
- Label: Parlophone; Atlantic
- Songwriter(s): David Guetta; Giorgio Tuinfort; Geoffro Early; Danny Majic; Justin Franks; Nico Sereba; Vincent Dery; Julie Frost
- Producer(s): Guetta; Tuinfort

"Lift Me Up" is a song by French DJ and producer David Guetta from his sixth studio album Listen. It features vocals in English from Norwegian duo Nico & Vinz, and South African choral group Ladysmith Black Mambazo. Ladysmith Black Mambazo sing in Zulu on the bridge, and also provide additional vocals before the drop. It is the only track on the album to feature a language other than English. The song is inspirational, which features lyrics of the protagonist trying to tell his lover to help him make the world a better place. It has charted in France.

== Charts ==
Chart (2014)	Peak position
France (SNEP)	157
