= That's How You Know (Nico & Vinz song) =

Single by Nico & Vinz featuring Kid Ink and Bebe Rexha

from the album Cornerstone
- Released: 17 July 2015
- Genre: Pop; folk pop; indie pop
- Length: 3:06
- Label: Warner Bros.
- Songwriters: Julia Michaels; Vincent Dery; Brian Collins; Nicolay Sereba
- Producer: Warren "Oak" Felder

Nico & Vinz singles chronology
"Fresh Idea" (2015)	"That's How You Know" (2015)	"Rivers" (2015)

Kid Ink singles chronology
"Baby's In Love" (2015)	"That’s How You Know" (2015)	"Get Home" (2015)

Bebe Rexha singles chronology
"Hey Mama" (2015)	"That’s How You Know" (2015)	"Battle Cry" (2015)

"That's How You Know" is a 2015 song by the Norwegian duo Nico & Vinz. It peaked at number nine on VG-lista, the Norwegian Official Singles Chart.

A later version released on 17 July 2015 by Nico & Vinz featuring American rapper Kid Ink and American singer-songwriter Bebe Rexha found wider international success.

== Track listing ==
Explicit version

No.	Title	Length
1.	"That's How You Know" (Explicit) (featuring Kid Ink & Bebe Rexha)	3:06

Clean version

No.	Title	Length
1.	"That's How You Know" (Clean) (featuring Kid Ink & Bebe Rexha)	3:06

Remixes single

No.	Title	Length
1.	"That's How You Know" (featuring Kid Ink & Bebe Rexha) (Wideboys Remix)	3:08
2.	"That's How You Know" (featuring Kid Ink & Bebe Rexha) (Danny Lee Remix)	3:38
3.	"That's How You Know" (NCTone Remix)	2:31
Total length:		9:17

HEYHEY Remixes single

No.	Title	Length
1.	"That's How You Know" (featuring Kid Ink & Bebe Rexha) (Messed Up HEYHEY Remix)	2:46
2.	"That's How You Know" (featuring Kid Ink & Bebe Rexha) (F****d Up HEYHEY Remix)	2:45
Total length:		5:31

== Music video ==
The music video was released on 1 September 2015 at a total length of 4 minutes and 4 seconds. It was directed by RJ Collins and Pasqual Gutierrez. The video features a house party in which all the four artists are singing while playing antics.

== Charts ==
=== Weekly charts ===
Nico & Vinz

Chart (2014)	Peak position
Norway (VG-lista)	9

Nico & Vinz featuring Kid Ink & Bebe Rexha

Chart (2015–16)	Peak position
Australia (ARIA)	2
Austria (Ö3 Austria Top 40)	12
Czech Republic Singles Digital (ČNS IFPI)	32
Denmark (Tracklisten)	32
Germany (GfK)	65
Ireland (IRMA)	39
Netherlands (Dutch Top 40)	29
Netherlands (Single Top 100)	30
New Zealand (Recorded Music NZ)	17
Norway (VG-lista)	2
Slovakia Singles Digital (ČNS IFPI)	30
Sweden (Sverigetopplistan)	62
South Africa (EMA)	14
US Bubbling Under Hot 100 (Billboard)	20
US Pop Airplay (Billboard)	35
US Rhythmic Airplay (Billboard)	33

=== Year-end charts ===
Chart (2015)	Position
Australia (ARIA)	67
Netherlands (NPO 3FM)	100

== Certifications ==
Region	Certification	Certified units/sales
Australia (ARIA)	Platinum	70,000^{^}
Denmark (IFPI Danmark)	Gold	30,000^{^}
New Zealand (RMNZ)	Platinum	30,000^{‡}
Norway (IFPI Norway)	4× Platinum	160,000^{‡}
^{^} Shipments figures based on certification alone.^{‡} Sales+streaming figures based on certification alone.
