= Am I Wrong =

Single by Nico & Vinz (Note: Previously credited to the duo's original name, Envy. Later international releases from 21 January 2014 onwards, coinciding with the duo's name change, were credited to Nico & Vinz.)

from the album Black Star Elephant
- Released: 12 April 2013
- Recorded: 2012
- Genre: Pop; reggae fusion; Afrobeat
- Length: 4:07 (album version); 4:47 (music video version); 3:39 (radio edit)
- Label: 5 Star; EMI; Warner Bros.
- Songwriters: William Wiik Larsen; Nico Sereba; Vincent Dery; Abdoulie Jallow
- Producer: Cisse Methods

Nico & Vinz singles chronology
"One Song" (2011)	"Am I Wrong" (2013)	"In Your Arms" (2013)

Music video
- "Am I Wrong" on YouTube

Alternative cover
- Original cover art with Envy artist credit

"Am I Wrong" is a song by Norwegian musical duo Nico & Vinz. It was written by group members Nico Sereba and Vincent Dery, Abdoulie Jallow, and William Wiik Larsen. The song was initially released as a digital download single in Norway on 12 April 2013, credited to the duo's previous name Envy, and became a hit in various Nordic countries, including Norway, Sweden, Denmark, and Finland.

Upon being released internationally, and following the duo's name change to Nico & Vinz, the song attained commercial success in various other countries, reaching number one in Canada, New Zealand, the United Kingdom and the top five in Australia, and the United States, among other nations. It is certified 14-times Platinum in their home country of Norway, 6-times Platinum in the US, Australia, and Canada, and Gold or higher in nine additional countries.

== Background ==
During an interview on Good Morning America, when asked about the meaning of the song and what inspired them to make it, Nico Sereba said: "Inspiration is coming from a small country, but having huge dreams and people telling you, man, that's not realistic, come on, you can't be on the top of America or the top of the world or whatever we dream of."

== Release ==
"Am I Wrong" was originally released on 12 April 2013, following the moderately successful singles under their name Envy "Set to Go" (2010), "One Song" (2011) and "Go Loud" (2012) and their name change to Nico & Vinz by the end of 2012 to avoid being confused with other artists with a similar name.

== Critical reception ==
Jason Lipshutz of Billboard wrote that while "lines like 'Am I wrong/For trying to reach the things that I can't see?' [are sung] with dead-eyed earnestness... the slide guitar and backing harmonies keep the song an airy affair."

== Commercial performance ==
Envy's "Am I Wrong" charted in Norway, Sweden, Denmark and Finland and was credited as such in the charts of those countries. The single peaked at number two in Norway in June 2013 and in Denmark and Sweden in August 2013, and at number five in Finland in November 2013.

Following the success of the single in the Scandinavian countries and the duo's name change to Nico & Vinz, the song entered several other international singles charts. In the United States, the song peaked at number four on the Billboard Hot 100, becoming the highest-charting song by a Norwegian artist since a-ha's "Take On Me" in 1985. The song reached its first million sales mark in the US in June 2014, and its second million in September 2014, having sold 2.2 million by the year's end. In the United Kingdom, the song peaked at number one, making Nico & Vinz the first Norwegian act to top the UK Singles Chart since a-ha's "The Sun Always Shines on T.V." in 1986.

== Music video ==
A music video to accompany the release of "Am I Wrong" was first released onto YouTube on 21 June 2013 at a total length of five minutes and five seconds. The video was directed and edited by Kavar Singh. The video was shot in Africa – namely Maun in Botswana as well as Victoria Falls, located on the Zambezi River on the border between Zambia (to the north) and Zimbabwe (to the south) – where the duo walk around with a TV each, trying to find a signal to locate the other. According to the band, it was put together in an effort to present a positive side of Africa, with the continent too often mired in negative news stories.

== Cover versions ==
- In 2015, Lower Than Atlantis released a Live Lounge performance of the song on the 2015 reissue of their self-titled album.
- In 2021, it was featured in the film Cinderella.
- In 2023, Maria and the Penfolds covered the song.

== Remix ==
- In 2024, the duo released a Norwegian-language version of the song called "Tar jeg feil".

== Track listings ==
- Digital download
1. "Am I Wrong" – 4:07
- CD single (Germany)
1. "Am I Wrong" – 4:08
2. "Am I Wrong" (instrumental) – 4:06

== Charts ==
=== Weekly charts ===
2013–2015 weekly chart performance for "Am I Wrong"
Chart (2013–2015)	Peak position
Australia (ARIA)	2
Austria (Ö3 Austria Top 40)	4
Belgium (Ultratop 50 Flanders)	9
Belgium (Ultratop 50 Wallonia)	13
Brazil (Billboard Hot 100)	1
Canada Hot 100 (Billboard)	1
CIS Airplay (TopHit)	1
Czech Republic Airplay (ČNS IFPI)	7
Czech Republic Singles Digital (ČNS IFPI)	2
Denmark (Tracklisten) Norwegian issue	2
Finland (Suomen virallinen lista) Norwegian issue	5
France (SNEP)	6
Germany (GfK)	3
Greece International (IFPI)	2
Hungary (Rádiós Top 40)	23
Hungary (Single Top 40)	18
Ireland (IRMA)	3
Israel International Airplay (Media Forest)	1
Italy (FIMI)	10
Japan Hot 100 (Billboard)	17
Luxembourg Digital Songs (Billboard)	3
Netherlands (Dutch Top 40)	1
Netherlands (Single Top 100)	5
New Zealand (Recorded Music NZ)	1
Norway (VG-lista) Norwegian issue	2
Poland Airplay (ZPAV)	1
Poland Dance (ZPAV)	8
Romania Airplay (Media Forest)	1
Russia Airplay (TopHit)	1
Scottish Singles Sales (Official Charts)	2
Slovakia Airplay (ČNS IFPI)	1
Slovakia Singles Digital (ČNS IFPI)	2
Slovenia Airplay (SloTop50)	6
South Africa Airplay (EMA)	3
Spain (Promusicae)	16
Sweden (Sverigetopplistan) Norwegian issue	2
Switzerland (Schweizer Hitparade)	7
UK Singles (Official Charts)	1
Ukraine Airplay (TopHit)	5
US Billboard Hot 100	4
US Adult Contemporary (Billboard)	1
US Adult Pop Airplay (Billboard)	1
US Dance Airplay (Billboard)	1
US Dance Club Songs (Billboard)	18
US Latin Airplay (Billboard)	35
US Pop Airplay (Billboard)	1
US Rhythmic Airplay (Billboard)	1

2025–2026 weekly chart performance
Chart (2025–2026)	Peak position
Kazakhstan Airplay (TopHit)	90
Moldova Airplay (TopHit)	76

=== Year-end charts ===
2013 year-end chart performance for "Am I Wrong"
Chart (2013)	Position
Sweden (Sverigetopplistan)	26

2014 year-end chart performance for "Am I Wrong"
Chart (2014)	Position
Australia (ARIA)	16
Austria (Ö3 Austria Top 40)	23
Belgium (Ultratop Flanders)	42
Belgium (Ultratop Wallonia)	56
Canada (Canadian Hot 100)	13
France (SNEP)	61
Germany (Official German Charts)	18
Hungary (Rádiós Top 40)	98
Israel (Media Forest)	15
Italy (FIMI)	27
Japan Adult Contemporary (Billboard)	34
Netherlands (Dutch Top 40)	2
Netherlands (Single Top 100)	13
New Zealand (Recorded Music NZ)	13
Poland (ZPAV)	8
Romania (Airplay 100)	10
Russia Airplay (TopHit)	4
Slovenia (SloTop50)	21
Sweden (Sverigetopplistan)	58
Switzerland (Schweizer Hitparade)	30
Ukraine Airplay (TopHit)	68
UK Singles (Official Charts Company)	21
US Billboard Hot 100	14
US Adult Contemporary (Billboard)	10
US Adult Top 40 (Billboard)	10
US Dance/Mix Show Airplay (Billboard)	33
US Mainstream Top 40 (Billboard)	4
US Rhythmic (Billboard)	18

2015 year-end chart performance for "Am I Wrong"
Chart (2015)	Position
Brazil (Crowley)	72
US Adult Contemporary (Billboard)	13

2016 year-end chart performance for "Am I Wrong"
Chart (2016)	Position
Brazil (Brasil Hot 100)	40

=== Decade-end charts ===
2010s chart rankings for "Am I Wrong"
Chart (2010s)	Rank
Netherlands (Single Top 100)	62

== Certifications ==
Certifications for "Am I Wrong"
Region	Certification	Certified units/sales
Australia (ARIA)	6× Platinum	420,000^{‡}
Austria (IFPI Austria)	Gold	15,000^{*}
Canada (Music Canada)	6× Platinum	480,000^{‡}
Denmark (IFPI Danmark)	Gold	15,000^{^}
Germany (BVMI)	3× Gold	900,000^{‡}
Italy (FIMI)	2× Platinum	60,000^{‡}
New Zealand (RMNZ)	4× Platinum	120,000^{‡}
Norway (IFPI Norway)	14× Platinum	140,000^{*}
Spain (Promusicae)	Platinum	40,000^{‡}
Sweden (GLF)	Platinum	40,000^{‡}
Switzerland (IFPI Switzerland)	Gold	15,000^{^}
United Kingdom (BPI)	3× Platinum	1,800,000^{‡}
United States (RIAA)	6× Platinum	6,000,000^{‡}
Streaming
Denmark (IFPI Danmark)	3× Platinum	5,400,000^{†}
Norway (IFPI Norway)	3× Platinum	9,000,000^{†}
Spain (Promusicae)	Platinum	8,000,000^{†}
^{*} Sales figures based on certification alone.^{^} Shipments figures based on certification alone.^{‡} Sales+streaming figures based on certification alone.^{†} Streaming-only figures based on certification alone.

== Release history ==
Region	Date	Format	Label
Finland	12 April 2013	Digital download	5 Star; EMI
Norway	12 April 2013	Digital download	5 Star; Parlophone
Australia	21 January 2014	Digital download	Warner Bros.
Germany	21 January 2014	Digital download	Warner Bros.
United States	21 January 2014	Digital download	Warner Bros.
Germany	21 February 2014	CD single	Warner Bros.
United States	1 April 2014	Contemporary hit radio	Warner Bros.
United Kingdom	4 August 2014	Digital download	Warner Bros.
Canada	7 November 2020	Digital download	Warner Bros.

== See also ==
- List of number-one singles from the 2010s (New Zealand)
- List of Billboard Adult Contemporary number ones of 2014
