= One Song (Envy song) =

Single by Envy

from the album The Magic Soup and the Bittersweet Faces
- Released: 10 June 2011
- Recorded: 2011
- Genre: Hip hop; rap rock
- Length: 3:57
- Label: 5 Star; Universal
- Songwriter(s): Vincent Dery, William Larsen, Nicolay Sereba

Envy singles chronology
"One Song" (2011)	"Am I Wrong (as Nico & Vinz)" (2013)

Music video
- "One Song" on YouTube

"One Song" is a song by Norwegian hip hop duo Envy. It was released as the lead and only single from their debut studio album The Magic Soup and the Bittersweet Faces (2012). It was released as a digital download in Norway on 10 June 2011. The song has peaked to number 19 in Norway.

== Music video ==
A music video to accompany the release of "One Song" was first released onto YouTube on 2 August 2011 at a total length of four minutes and thirty seconds.

== Track listings ==
Digital download
No.	Title	Length
1.	"One Song"	3:57

== Charts ==
Chart (2011)	Peak position
Norway (VG-lista)	19

== Certifications ==
Region	Certification	Certified units/sales
Norway (IFPI Norway)	Platinum	10,000^{*}
^{*} Sales figures based on certification alone.

== Release history ==
Region	Date	Format	Label
Norway	10 June 2011	Digital download	5 Star; Universal
