= The Magic Soup and the Bittersweet Faces =

Studio album by Envy
- Released: 27 April 2012
- Recorded: 2011–12
- Genre: Hip-hop
- Labels: 5 Star Entertainment; Universal Music Group

Envy chronology
The Magic Soup and the Bittersweet Faces (2012)	Black Star Elephant (2014)

Singles from The Magic Soup and the Bittersweet Faces
- 1. "One Song" Released: 10 June 2011

The Magic Soup and the Bittersweet Faces is the debut studio album by Norwegian hip hop duo Envy, and the only album credited to that name before they later changed it to Nico & Vinz. It was released in Norway on 27 April 2012. The album peaked at number 37 on the Norwegian Albums Chart. The album includes the single "One Song".

== Singles ==
- "One Song" was released as the lead single from the album on 10 June 2011. The song peaked at number 19 on the Norwegian Singles Chart.
- "Go Loud" was released as the second and last single, which came out in 2012 from the album.

== Track listing ==
Standard edition
No.	Title	Length
1.	"Intro"	2:44
2.	"Go Loud"	4:01
3.	"Everywhere"	3:23
4.	"No Love in the Club"	4:18
5.	"Bombs" (Interlude)	0:29
6.	"B.O.H." (Bombs Over Here)	3:36
7.	"Keep It Down Low"	3:53
8.	"So Everything"	2:57
9.	"Slow Down" (featuring Nico D)	3:03
10.	"One Song"	3:54
11.	"Come Over"	3:04
12.	"When It All Falls Down"	3:39
13.	"Up and Away"	3:26
14.	"Free Bird" (Interlude)	1:09
15.	"5 Star"	3:26

== Chart performance ==
Chart (2012)	Peak position
Norwegian Albums (VG-lista)	37

== Release history ==
Region	Release date	Format	Label
Norway	27 April 2012	Digital download; CD	5 Star Entertainment; Universal Music Group
