= Black Star Elephant =

Studio album by Nico & Vinz
- Released: 16 September 2014
- Recorded: 2012–2014
- Genres: Pop; Afropop
- Length: 57:29
- Labels: Warner Bros.; 5 Star Entertainment
- Producers: Vincent Dery; Thomas Eriksen; William "Will IDAP" Wiik Larsen; Magnus "Magnify" Martinsen; Stargate; Kouame Sereba; Kahouly Nicolay Sereba; Raymond Sereba; Petter "Walther" Walthinsen

Nico & Vinz chronology
The Magic Soup and the Bittersweet Faces (2012)	Black Star Elephant (2014)	Cornerstone (2015)

Singles from Black Star Elephant
- 1. "Am I Wrong" Released: 12 April 2013; 2. "In Your Arms" Released: 21 October 2013; 3. "When the Day Comes" Released: 30 September 2014; 4. "My Melody" Released: 6 February 2015

Black Star Elephant is the second and final studio album by Norwegian duo Nico & Vinz and their first album under that moniker, following a name change from Envy. It was released in Australia on 16 September 2014, and on 14 October 2014 in the United States. It contains fourteen songs and 7 interludes.

The album garnered a mixed reception from critics divided by the production and the duo's socially conscious lyrics. It debuted at number one in Norway and reached the top 40 in countries like Australia, New Zealand and the United States, spawning four singles: "Am I Wrong", "In Your Arms", "When the Day Comes", and "My Melody". Following its release, "Am I Wrong" went on to become the duo's most successful hit single to date.

== Critical reception ==
Professional ratings
Aggregate scores
Source	Rating
Metacritic	58/100
Review scores
Source	Rating
AllMusic	3/5 stars
Billboard	2.5/5 stars
The Guardian	3/5 stars
The Northern Echo	7/10
PopMatters	6/10 stars
Renowned for Sound	2.5/5 stars

Black Star Elephant received mixed reviews from music critics divided by the mixture of the duo's socially conscious lyrics and the production driving it. At Metacritic, which assigns a normalized rating out of 100 to reviews from mainstream critics, the album received an average score of 58, based on 5 reviews.

Jon Caramanica of The New York Times praised the duo's decision to deliver social issues through African-influenced pop production that didn't muddle it, saying that "Behind that choice seems to be an understanding that reaching the most really means alienating the fewest." Simon Harker of The Northern Echo praised the album's upbeat pop numbers for delivering social messages that feel refreshing, concluding that "Not every track manages to avoid coming across a little too treacly or earnest, but the likes of the Stargate-helmed 'Imagine' and easygoing rhythms of 'In Your Arms' are just as catchy and enjoyable as their best-known hit." AllMusic's Stephen Thomas Erlewine felt that the duo's approach to genre-bending tracks resembled that of Bruno Mars but that it also helped shaped them, concluding that "this cultural disconnect enhances them because it emphasizes how, at their core, Nico & Vinz are lite bubblegum worldbeat pop, and will try on any fashion just as long as it might bring them a hit."

Brent Faulkner of PopMatters said that despite the record's misuse of interludes and its tracks being too sugary and not quite matching "Am I Wrong", he praised the duo's delivery of social consciousness for sounding authentic, saying that "All in all, Black Star Elephant seems accomplished in its goals – delivering an album that thrives off its ‘good vibes’. There is no denying that Nico & Vinz better their listeners by eschewing negativity, not to mention avoiding profanity for the most part. That said, sometimes so much positivity grows ever too schmaltzy and a bit blasé." Caroline Sullivan of The Guardian praised the duo's vocal delivery of inspiration lyrics over eclectic worldbeat production but felt the interludes drag their message down, saying that it "nudges the album into the cheese zone." Chuck Arnold of Billboard said that despite the duo showing some heart and charm on tracks like "Know What I'm Not", he criticized the album's cheesy African instrumentation and inspirational lyrics, concluding that "Black Star Elephant goes all amateur theater Lion King on you. That shows just how wrong Nico & Vinz can be."

== Track listing ==
No.	Title	Writer(s)	Producer(s)	Length
1.	"Intro" (interlude)	Raymond Sereba; Kouame Sereba	Kahouly Nicolay Sereba; Vincent Dery; R. Sereba; K. Sereba; Magnus "Magnify" Martinsen^{[a]}; Petter "Walther" Walthinsen^{[a]}	0:39
2.	"Am I Wrong"	Dery; K. N. Sereba; William "Will IDAP" Wiik Larsen; Abdoulie Jallow	Larsen	4:07
3.	"Last Time"	Dery; K. N. Sereba; Thomas Eriksen; David Agwumaro	Eriksen	4:19
4.	"Leave Us" (interlude)	R. Sereba; K. Sereba	K. N. Sereba; Dery; R. Sereba; K. Sereba; Martinsen^{[a]}; Walthinsen^{[a]}	0:18
5.	"Know What I'm Not"	Dery; K. N. Sereba; Larsen; Jørgen Ousman Jaquesson Sowe	Larsen	3:48
6.	"Miracles"	Dery; K. N. Sereba; Agwumaro; Sowe; Larsen; Terje Wiik	Larsen	3:25
7.	"New in Town" (interlude)	R. Sereba; K. Sereba; Martinsen	R. Sereba; K. Sereba	0:26
8.	"My Melody"	Dery; K. N. Sereba; Ntirelang Berman; Larsen	Larsen	4:11
9.	"Powerful" (interlude)	R. Sereba; K. Sereba	K. N. Sereba; Dery; R. Sereba; K. Sereba; Martinsen^{[a]}; Walthinsen^{[a]}	0:15
10.	"Another Day"	Dery; K. N. Sereba; Magnus Eliassen; Erik Eliassen; Larsen	Larsen; Eliassen	2:19
11.	"People"	Dery; K. N. Sereba; Dave Kuncio; Larsen	Larsen	4:23
12.	"Runnin'"	Dery; K. N. Sereba; Eriksen; Agwumaro	Eriksen	4:15
13.	"Imagine"	Dery; K. N. Sereba; Mikkel S. Eriksen; Tor Erik Hermansen; Larsen	Stargate; Larsen	2:57
14.	"In Your Arms"	Dery; K. N. Sereba; Larsen; Chriss Rune Olsen Angvik	Larsen	3:25
15.	"Homeless"	Dery; K. N. Sereba; Ntirelang Berman; Larsen	Larsen	2:59
16.	"Lakota" (interlude)	R. Sereba; K. Sereba	K. N. Sereba; Dery; R. Sereba; K. Sereba; Martinsen^{[a]}; Walthinsen^{[a]}	1:23
17.	"Thought I Knew"	Dery; K. N. Sereba; Eriksen	Eriksen	4:25
18.	"Arrival" (interlude)	R. Sereba; K. Sereba	K. N. Sereba; Dery; R. Sereba; K. Sereba; Martinsen^{[a]}; Walthinsen^{[a]}	0:34
19.	"When the Day Comes"	Dery; K. N. Sereba; Sowe; Larsen	Larsen	3:47
20.	"Kokadinye" (interlude)	R. Sereba; K. Sereba	K. N. Sereba; Dery; R. Sereba; K. Sereba; Martinsen^{[a]}; Walthinsen^{[a]}	1:29
21.	"Imaa Imaa"	Dery; K. N. Sereba; Eriksen; Agwumaro	Eriksen	4:05
Total length:				57:36

Notes

- ^{^[a]} signifies an additional producer
- "Imagine" contains an interpolation of "The Champ" written by Harry Palmer.

== Charts ==
Chart performance for Black Star Elephant
Chart (2014)	Peak position
Australian Albums (ARIA)	17
New Zealand Albums (RMNZ)	28
Norwegian Albums (VG-lista)	1
UK Albums (Official Charts)	131
US Billboard 200	45

== Certifications ==
Certifications for Black Star Elephant
Region	Certification	Certified units/sales
New Zealand (RMNZ)	Platinum	15,000^{‡}
^{‡} Sales+streaming figures based on certification alone.
