= Nico & Vinz =

Norwegian duo

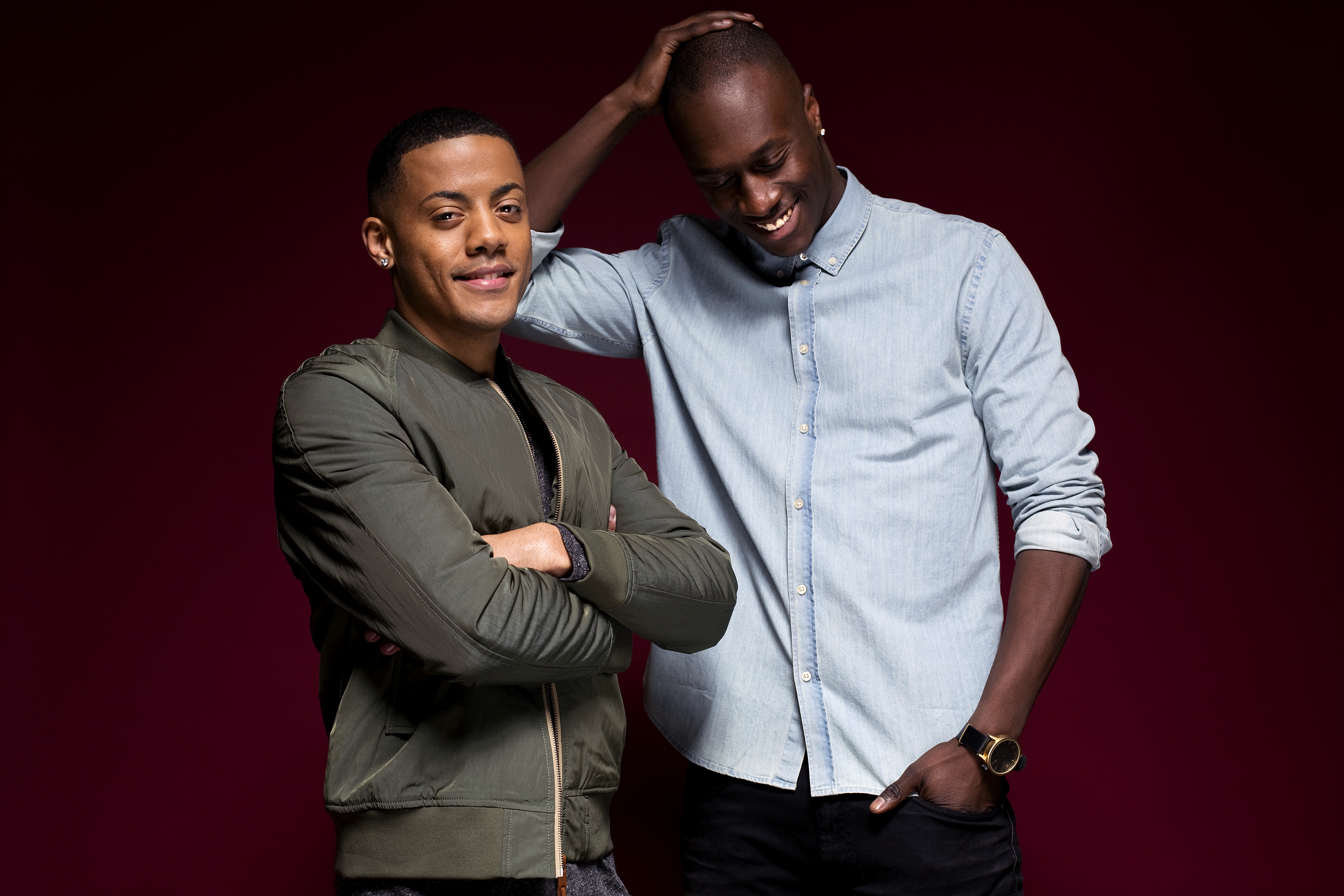
- Nico & Vinz in 2013

Background information
- Also known as: Envy (2010–2012)
- Origin: Oslo, Norway
- Genres: Pop
- Years active: 2010–present
- Labels: Island; Warner
- Members: Kahouly Nicolay Sereba; Vincent Dery

Nico & Vinz are a Norwegian duo consisting of Kahouly Nicolay "Nico" Sereba from Holmlia, Oslo and Vincent "Vinz" Dery from Lambertseter, Oslo. They formed in 2010 as Envy but changed their name to Nico & Vinz by the end of 2012. They are commonly associated with their biggest hit single "Am I Wrong", which peaked at number 2 in Norway, Denmark and Sweden, number 1 in the United Kingdom and number 4 in the United States.

== Music career ==
=== 2010–2011: Formation and debut mixtape ===
Nicolay Sereba, of Norwegian-Ivorian origin, and Vincent Dery, of Ghanaian origin, created their music as a fusion of genres as diverse as pop to reggae to soul, having been exposed by the various musical influences of their parents with whom they did recurring trips to the West Coast of Africa. Sereba speaks English, Norwegian and French. Dery speaks English, Norwegian and Dagaare.

The duo was launched as Envy with its main debut appearance at the Emergenza music festival (Barcelona) in 2011, and won the final at the Taubertal Open Air Festival for new emerging artists. Their touring band consists of fellow NISS students bassist Halvor Rollag and Chriss Rune Olsen Angvik from Red Hot and multi-instrumentalist Magnus "Magnify" Martinsen, drummer Svein Inge Bjørkedal and keyboardist Daniel Strand from 2011 until 2015. Following their initial success, the duo released the mixtape Dreamworks: Why Not Me under the name Envy.

In June 2011, the duo released their debut single "One Song" under the name Envy. The song peaked to number 19 on the Norwegian Singles Chart.

=== 2011: The Magic Soup and the Bittersweet Faces ===
Envy released their debut studio album The Magic Soup and the Bittersweet Faces on 27 April 2012, peaking to number 37 on the Norwegian Albums Chart. "One Song" was released as the lead single from the album peaking at number 19 on the Norwegian Singles Chart. It was followed by "Go Loud" released as a follow-up second and last single from the album.

=== 2013–14: Breakthrough and "Am I Wrong" international success ===
In April 2013, they released "Am I Wrong" after the duo changed their name from Envy to Nico & Vinz, in coordination with their signing to Warner Bros. Records in the United States to avoid being confused with other artists with a similar name. With international success of the single, the duo changed the credits of the single to their new adopted name. The song peaked at number 2 on the Norwegian Singles Chart and also peaked at number 2 on the Danish Singles Chart and number 2 on the Swedish Singles Chart. It also reached number one on the Mainstream Top 40 chart. It was followed up with another release "In Your Arms" which also charted in Norway, Denmark and Sweden.

The music video for "Am I Wrong" was directed and edited by African Folk music composer Kavar Singh. The video for "Am I Wrong" was filmed in Botswana and at the Victoria Falls between Zambia and Zimbabwe. It was put together in a deliberate effort to present a positive side of Africa when the image of the continent is too often mired in negative news stories. The music video was released via YouTube on 20 June 2013.

In early 2014, Nico & Vinz received the European Border Breakers Award (EBBA) at Eurosonic Festival, performed at the Spellemann Awards, completed a Scandinavian tour, and launched "Am I Wrong" worldwide. When "Am I Wrong" made its American radio debut in April 2014, it was the number one most added record at the mainstream radio format and it peaked at number 4 on the Billboard Hot 100. They performed "Am I Wrong" at the iHeartRadio Music Festival in Las Vegas, as well as for the television show Dancing with the Stars in Los Angeles. In August 2015, Nico and Vinz were special guests on Taylor Swift's 1989 World Tour in Vancouver, BC performing "Am I Wrong" at BC Place.

Their album Black Star Elephant was released in September 2014, followed by the single "When the Day Comes" in October 2014.

Nico & Vinz were featured on a track of David Guetta's 2014 album Listen, named "Lift Me Up" along with South African group Ladysmith Black Mambazo.

Their song "Find a Way", featuring Emmanuel Jal, is featured in the film The Good Lie. "When the Day Comes" is featured the EA Sports game FIFA 15.

=== 2015–present: Extended plays Cornerstone & Elephant in the Room ===
In October 2015, the duo released the EP Cornerstone. "That's How You Know", featuring Kid Ink and Bebe Rexha, was released as the first single from the EP and peaked at number 2 in both Norway and Australia. They also featured in Alesso's song "I Wanna Know".

Nico & Vinz then released "Hold It Together" in January 2016, which is taken from their third studio album, due later in 2016.

The second single from Cornerstone was "Praying to a God".

In November 2017, Nico & Vinz released their new EP Elephant In The Room including their new singles "Intrigued" and "Listen".

In 2019, Nico & Vinz revealed in a podcast interview that they were working on their sophomore album; however, no updates on the album have been shared since.

== Honours ==
- 2014: Spellemannprisen as Spellemann of the Year

== Discography ==
Studio albums

- The Magic Soup and the Bittersweet Faces (2012) (credited as Envy)
- Black Star Elephant (2014)

Mixtapes

- Dreamworks: Why Not Me (2010) (credited as Envy)

Extended plays

- Cornerstone (2015)
- Elephant in the Room (2017)

Awards
Preceded by Ole Paus	Recipient of the Spellemannprisen as Spellemann of the Year; 2014	Succeeded by -
