= List of awards and nominations received by Train =

Rock Band in San Francisco

Train awards and nominations
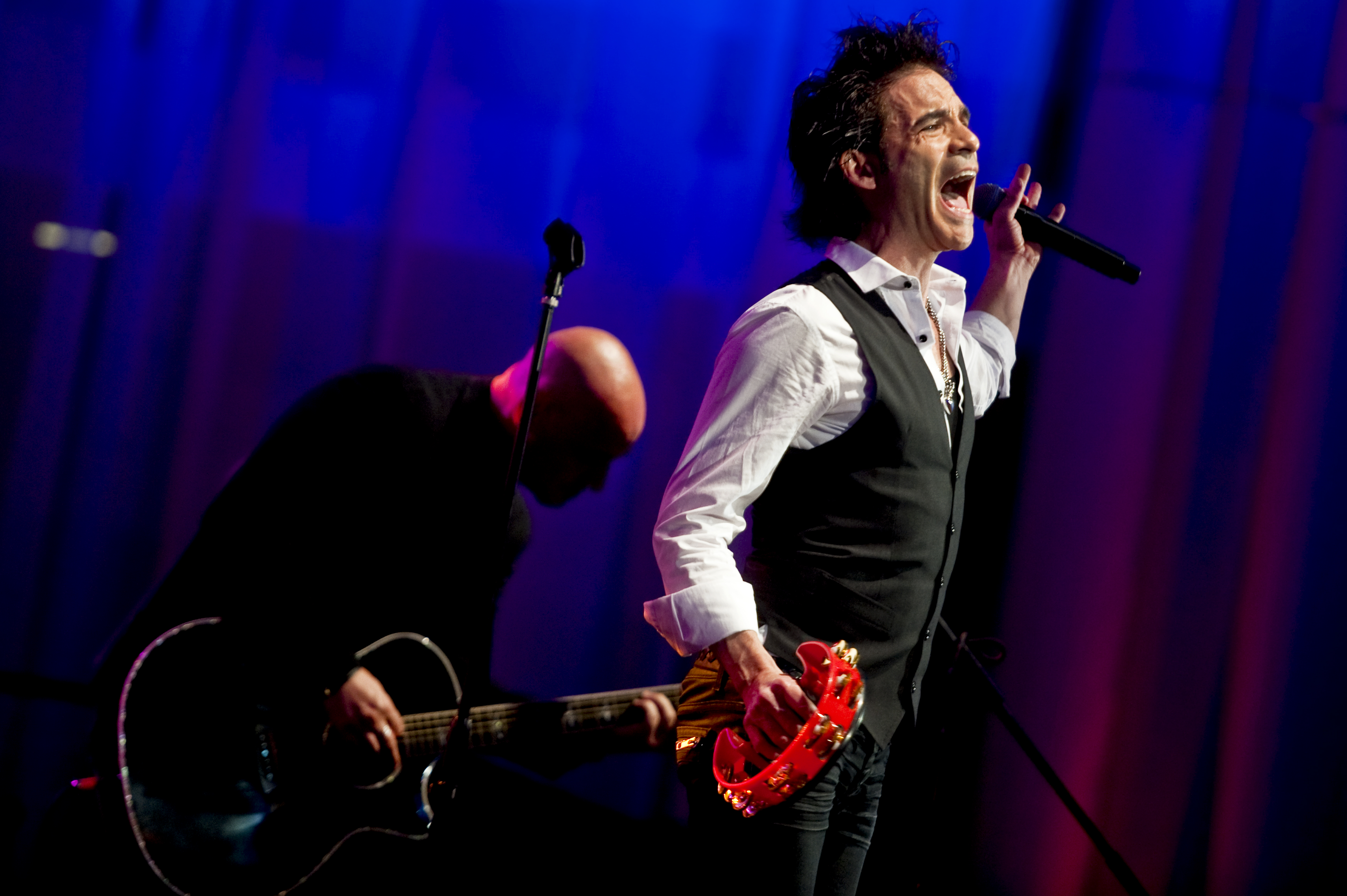
- Train performing in 2011
Awards and nominations
Award	Wins	Nominations
American Music Awards	0	3
ARIA	0	1
Billboard	2	2
CMT	0	1
Grammy	3	8
Nickelodeon Kids' Choice	0	1
People's Choice	0	1
Teen Choice	0	3

Totals (Note: Certain award groups do not simply award one winner. They acknowledge several different recipients, have runners-up, and have third place. Since this is a specific recognition and is different from losing an award, runner-up mentions are considered wins in this award tally. For simplification and to avoid errors, each award in this list has been presumed to have had a prior nomination.)
- Wins: 7
- Nominations: 23

Train is an American roots rock band from San Francisco.

== Grammy Awards ==
The Grammy Awards are awarded annually by the National Academy of Recording Arts and Sciences. Train have been nominated for eight awards and won three.

Year	Nominee / work	Award	Result	Ref
2002	"Drops of Jupiter (Tell Me)"	Record of the Year	Nominated	
2002	"Drops of Jupiter (Tell Me)"	Song of the Year	Nominated	
2002	"Drops of Jupiter (Tell Me)"	Best Rock Performance by a Duo or Group with Vocal	Nominated	
2002	"Drops of Jupiter (Tell Me)"	Best Rock Song	Won	
2002	"Drops of Jupiter (Tell Me)"	Best Instrumental Arrangement Accompanying Vocalist(s)	Won	
2004	"Calling All Angels"	Best Rock Performance by a Duo or Group with Vocal	Nominated	
2004	"Calling All Angels"	Best Rock Song	Nominated	
2011	"Hey, Soul Sister" (Live)	Best Pop Performance by a Duo or Group with Vocals	Won	

== American Music Awards ==
The American Music Awards are determined by a poll of music buyers, and as a result is more of a representation of public opinion. Train have received three nominations.

Year	Nominee / work	Award	Result	Ref
2010	Train	Favorite Pop/Rock Band/Duo/Group	Nominated	
2010	Train	Favorite Adult Contemporary Artist	Nominated	
2012	Train	Favorite Adult Contemporary Artist	Nominated	

== ARIA Music Awards ==
The ARIA Music Awards are awards celebrating the Australian music industry, put on by the Australian Recording Industry Association. Train has received one nomination.

Year	Nominee / work	Award	Result	Ref
2010	Train	Most Popular International Artist	Nominated	

== ASCAP Pop Music Awards ==
The American Society of Composers, Authors and Publishers annually honors the top performers in Pop music. Train has claimed one award.

Year	Nominee / work	Award	Result	Ref
2011	"Hey, Soul Sister"	Song of the Year	Won	

== Billboard Music Awards ==
The Billboard Music Awards are based on album and digital songs sales, streaming, radio airplay, touring and social engagement. Train has won two awards.

Year	Nominee / work	Award	Result	Ref
2011	Train	Top Rock Artist	Won	
2011	"Hey, Soul Sister"	Top Rock Song	Won	

== CMT Music Awards ==
The CMT Music Awards is a fan-voted awards show for country music videos and television performances. Train has been nominated once.

Year	Nominee / work	Award	Result	Ref
2011	"A Broken Wing" (with Martina McBride)	CMT Performance of the Year	Nominated	

== Danish Music Awards ==
The Danish Music Awards (DMA) is a Danish award show. The show has been arranged by IFPI since 1989, and was originally called IFPI-prisen ("IFPI-Award") until 1991, when it changed its name to Dansk Grammy ("Danish Grammy"). The current name was given in 2001, after the American Grammy Awards registered the name Grammy as their trademark. In 2011 IFPI joined together with TV2 (Denmark) and KODA to present the awards ceremony.

Year	Nominee / work	Award	Result	Ref.
2002	"Drops of Jupiter (Tell Me)"	Best International Hit	Nominated	

== Nickelodeon Kids Choice Awards ==
The Nickelodeon Kids' Choice Awards honors the year's biggest television, movie, and music acts as voted by Nickelodeon viewers. Train has received one nomination.

Year	Nominee / work	Award	Result	Ref
2011	"Hey, Soul Sister"	Favorite Song	Nominated	

== Peoples Choice Awards ==
The People's Choice Awards are a venue for the American public to honor their favorite actors and actresses, musical performers, television shows, and motion pictures, and is voted on by the general public. Train has been nominated once.

Year	Nominee / work	Award	Result	Ref
2013	Train	Favorite Band	Nominated	

== Radio Music Awards ==
The Radio Music Awards was an annual American award show that honored the year's most successful songs on mainstream radio. Train earned one award.

Year	Nominee / work	Award	Result	Ref
2004	Train	Artist of the Year: Modern Adult	Won	

== Teen Choice Awards ==
The Teen Choice Awards honor the year's biggest achievements in music, film, sports, television, fashion, and more, voted by viewers aged 13 to 20. Train has received three nominations.

Year	Nominee / work	Award	Result	Ref
2010	Train	Choice Music: Rock Artist	Nominated	
2010	"Hey, Soul Sister"	Choice Music: Rock Track	Nominated	
2010	Save Me, San Francisco	Choice Music: Rock Album	Nominated	
