= Save Me, San Francisco (song) =

Single by Train

from the album Save Me, San Francisco
- Released: April 25, 2011
- Recorded: 2009
- Length: 4:09
- Label: Columbia Records
- Songwriters: Dave Katz, Sam Hollander, Pat Monahan
- Producer: Martin Terefe

Train singles chronology
"Shake Up Christmas" (2010)	"Save Me, San Francisco" (2011)	"Drive By" (2012)

Music video
- "Train - Save Me, San Francisco" on YouTube

"Save Me, San Francisco" is a song by the American pop rock band Train. It was released on April 25, 2011, as the fifth and final single from their fifth studio album of the same name (2009). The song was written by Dave Katz, Sam Hollander, and Pat Monahan and produced by Martin Terefe.

== Music video ==
A music video to accompany the release of "Save Me, San Francisco" was first released onto YouTube on April 29, 2011, at a total length of four minutes and 17 seconds.

The plot of the music video is an allusion to 1967 California classic The Graduate. Like in the film, the male protagonist (played by Pat) is uninvited and late to the wedding of his beloved girl, Elaine. He travels across San Francisco in his sports car to reach the wedding, but runs out of gas, and ends up sprinting the rest of the way. Pat bursts into the church and shouts out his objection — only to find that Elaine is marrying a lesbian. He is consoled by a wedding guest on the church steps as the newlyweds drive away. The video also features footage of a March 2011 Train concert in Oakland, CA

Much of the video was shot on Treasure Island in the San Francisco Bay. The church is at 51 California Ave. on the island.

== Chart performance ==
=== Weekly charts ===
Weekly chart performance for "Save Me, San Francisco"
Chart (2011)	Peak position
Australia (ARIA)	61
Hungary (Rádiós Top 40)	27
US Billboard Hot 100	75
US Adult Alternative Airplay (Billboard)	23
US Adult Contemporary (Billboard)	15
US Adult Pop Airplay (Billboard)	6

=== Year-end charts ===
Year-end chart performance for "Save Me, San Francisco"
Chart (2011)	Position
US Adult Contemporary (Billboard)	40
US Adult Top 40 (Billboard)	26

== Certifications ==
Certifications for "Save Me, San Francisco"
Region	Certification	Certified units/sales
United States (RIAA)	Gold	500,000^{‡}
^{‡} Sales+streaming figures based on certification alone.

== Release history ==
Release history for "Save Me, San Francisco"
Country	Date	Format	Label
United States	April 25, 2011	Digital download	Columbia
