= Eleven (Martina McBride album) =

Studio album by Martina McBride
- Released: October 11, 2011
- Recorded: 2011
- Studios: Blackbird (Nashville, Tennessee); Southern Tracks (Atlanta, Georgia)
- Genre: Country
- Length: 40:28
- Label: Republic Nashville
- Producers: Martina McBride; Byron Gallimore; Dann Huff (Track 7)

Martina McBride chronology
Shine (2009)	Eleven (2011)	Hits and More (2012)

Singles from Eleven
- 1. "Teenage Daughters" Released: March 21, 2011; 2. "I'm Gonna Love You Through It" Released: July 25, 2011; 3. "Marry Me" Released: March 26, 2012

Professional ratings
Aggregate scores
Source	Rating
Metacritic	(81/100)
Review scores
Source	Rating
AllMusic	4/5 stars
American Songwriter	3.5/5 stars
Billboard	(favorable)
The Boston Globe	(average)
Country Weekly	(favorable)
Entertainment Weekly	B
Robert Christgau	(1-star Honorable Mention)
USA Today	3/4 stars

Eleven is the eleventh studio album by American country music singer Martina McBride, released on October 11, 2011, through Republic Nashville. The title of the album was inspired by the fact that it is McBride's eleventh album, it has eleven tracks and its release date. A deluxe edition of the album was also made available exclusively at Target stores. It featured slightly different cover art, with a blue fade at the bottom instead of white, and included four bonus tracks, as well as music videos for "Teenage Daughters" and "I'm Gonna Love You Through It". As of March 2012 the album has sold over 150,000 copies in the US. On July 3, 2012 the four Deluxe Bonus Tracks were released on iTunes as individual singles.

== Track listing ==
No.	Title	Writer(s)	Length
1.	"One Night"	Martina McBride, Tommy Lee James, Claude Kelly	4:15
2.	"Always Be This Way"	McBride, Brett James, Hillary Lindsey	3:26
3.	"I'm Gonna Love You Through It"	Ben Hayslip, Sonya Isaacs, Jimmy Yeary	3:49
4.	"Marry Me" (featuring Pat Monahan)	Pat Monahan	3:46
5.	"Broken Umbrella"	Josh Kear, Mark Irwin, Chris Tompkins	3:17
6.	"You Can Get Your Lovin' Right Here"	McBride, Rachel Thibodeau, Leslie Satcher	3:47
7.	"Whatcha Gonna Do"	Thibodeau, Rebecca Lynn Howard, Jason Sever	3:58
8.	"Teenage Daughters"	McBride, Brad Warren, Brett Warren	4:07
9.	"Summer of Love"	McBride, James, Lindsey	4:21
10.	"When You Love a Sinner"	Kacey Musgraves, Jay Clementi, Chip Boyd	2:57
11.	"Long Distance Lullaby"	McBride, Irwin, Kear	2:49
Total length:			40:28

Deluxe edition bonus tracks
No.	Title	Writer(s)	Length
12.	"You're in My House Now"	McBride, Warren, Warren	3:35
13.	"Closing Time"	Sean McConnell	4:58
14.	"Ask the Boy"	McBride, Barry Dean, Troy Verges	3:27
15.	"I Give It to You"	Thibodeau	3:38
Total length:			56:07

Deluxe edition enhanced content
No.	Title	Length
1.	"Teenage Daughters" (Music video)	4:09
2.	"Teenage Daughters" (In the Studio video)	3:58
3.	"I'm Gonna Love You Through It" (Music video)	4:30

== Personnel ==
- Martina McBride – lead vocals, backing vocals
- Byron Gallimore – synthesizers
- Chuck Leavell – acoustic piano, Wurlitzer electric piano, Hammond B3 organ
- Mike Rojas – acoustic piano, Wurlitzer electric piano, Hammond B3 organ
- Gordon Mote – acoustic piano, Hammond B3 organ
- Jamie Muhoberac – synthesizers
- Tom Bukovac – acoustic guitar, electric guitar
- Dan Dugmore – acoustic guitar, electric guitar, steel guitar
- Dann Huff – electric guitar
- Michael Landau – electric guitar
- Brent Mason – electric guitar
- David A. Stewart – electric guitar
- Ilya Toshinsky – acoustic guitar, electric guitar, bouzouki, mandolin
- Paul Bushnell – bass
- Michael Rhodes – bass
- Craig Young – bass
- Matt Chamberlain – drums
- Shannon Forrest – drums, drum programming, percussion
- David Huff – drum programming
- Frank Macek – drum programming
- Ava McBride – Martina's youngest daughter, foot tapping (11)
- Stuart Duncan – fiddle
- Jim Horn – baritone saxophone, horn arrangements
- Jeff Coffin – tenor saxophone
- Charles Rose – trombone
- Scott Ducaj – trumpet
- John Catchings – cello
- Kristin Wilkinson – viola, string arrangements
- David Angell – violin
- David Davidson – violin
- The Nashville String Machine – strings (3, 9)
- David Campbell – string arrangements and conductor (3, 9)
- Perry Coleman – backing vocals
- Jimi Westbrook – harmony vocals (2)
- Pat Monahan – lead vocals (4)
- Carolyn Dawn Johnson – backing vocals (5)
- Phillip Sweet – harmony vocals (7)

== Production ==
- Bryan Gallimore – producer, mixing (2)
- Martina McBride – producer, liner notes
- Dann Huff – producer (7)
- Allison Jones – A&R
- Scott McBride – recording, mixing (4–11)
- Allen Ditto – additional recording, recording assistant, mix assistant (4–11)
- Erik Lutkins – additional recording, mix assistant (2)
- Justin Niebank – mixing (1, 3)
- Seth Morton – mix assistant (1, 3)
- Stephen Allbritten – mix assistant (2)
- Adam Ayan – mastering at Gateway Mastering (Portland, Maine)
- Shea Fowler – A&R production assistant
- Whitney Sutton – copy coordinator
- Sandi Spika Borchetta – art direction
- Lee Ann Ramey – graphic design
- Randee St. Nicholas – photography
- Claudia Fowler – wardrobe stylist
- Robert Steinken – hair stylist
- Collier Strong – make-up
- Bruce Allen – management

== Chart performance ==
=== Weekly charts ===
Chart (2011)	Peak position
UK Country Albums (Official Charts)	4
US Billboard 200	10
US Top Country Albums (Billboard)	4

=== Year-end charts ===
Chart (2011)	Position
US Top Country Albums (Billboard)	63
Chart (2012)	Position
US Top Country Albums (Billboard)	49

=== Singles ===
Year	Single	Peak chart positions	
Year	Single	US Country	US
2011	"Teenage Daughters"	17	100
2011	"I'm Gonna Love You Through It"	4	61
2012	"Marry Me"	45	—
"—" denotes releases that did not chart

== Tour dates ==
Date	City	Country	Venue
North America Leg 1
October 27, 2011	Santa Ynez	United States	Chumash Casino
October 28, 2011	Henderson	United States	Green Valley Ranch Resort & Spa
October 29, 2011	Las Vegas	United States	Wynn Hotel
October 30, 2011	Mescalero	United States	Inn of the Mountain Gods
November 5, 2011	St. Petersburg	United States	Demens Landing Park
December 9, 2011	Biloxi	United States	Beau Rivage Resort & Casino
January 27, 2012	Lafayette	United States	Cajundome
January 28, 2012	Bossier City	United States	CenturyLink Center
February 3, 2012	Phoenix	United States	US Airways Center
February 4, 2012	Las Vegas	United States	MGM Grand Garden Arena
February 10, 2012	Duluth	United States	Infinite Energy Arena
February 11, 2012	Orlando	United States	Amway Center
February 14, 2012	Los Angeles	United States	Microsoft Theatre
February 16, 2012	Tulsa	United States	BOK Center
February 17, 2012	St. Louis	United States	Scottrade Center
February 18, 2012	Wichita	United States	Intrust Bank Arena
February 24, 2012	Des Moines	United States	Wells Fargo Arena
February 25, 2012	Kansas City	United States	Sprint Center
April 2, 2012	Las Vegas	United States	MGM Grand Garden Arena
April 12, 2012	Panama City	United States	Marina Civic Center
April 13, 2012	St. Augustine	United States	St. Augustine Amphitheatre
April 14, 2012	Durham	United States	Durham Performing Arts Center
April 17, 2012	Nashville	United States	Grand Ole Opry
April 28, 2012	Ivins	United States	Tuacahn Amphitheatre
April 29, 2012	Indio	United States	Stagecoach Country Music Festival
May 11, 2012	Mahnomen	United States	Shooting Star Casino
May 12, 2012	Clear Lake	United States	Surf Ballroom
May 13, 2012	Wabash	United States	Honeywell Center
May 17, 2012	Austin	United States	Austin City Limits Live
May 18, 2012	Houston	United States	Arena Houston – Theater
June 8, 2012	Winsted	United States	Winstock Country Music Festival
June 13, 2012	Vienna	United States	Wolf Trap Filene Center
June 14, 2012	Kettering	United States	Fraze Pavilion
June 16, 2012	Riverside	United States	Riverside Casino and Golf Resort
June 22, 2012	Interlochen	United States	Kresge Auditorium
June 23, 2012	Richland Center	United States	Krouskop Park
July 11, 2012	Hollywood	United States	Hollywood Bowl
August 3, 2012	Henderson	United States	Green Valley Ranch Resort & Spa
August 4, 2012	West Wendover	United States	Peppermill Hotel & Casino
August 7, 2012	Santa Rosa	United States	Sonoma County Fair
August 8, 2012	Stockton	United States	Bob Hope Theater
August 9, 2012	Ventura	United States	Ventura County Fair
August 10, 2012	Costa Mesa	United States	Pacific Amphitheatre
August 18, 2012	Brownsville	United States	Willamette Country Music Festival
August 24, 2012	Wallingford	United States	Oakdale Theatre
August 25, 2012	Hyannis	United States	Cape Cod Melody Tent
August 26, 2012	Cohasset	United States	South Shore Music Circus
August 31, 2012	Biloxi	United States	IP Casino Resort Spa
September 1, 2012	Tuskahoma	United States	Choctaw Nation Capitol Grounds
September 3, 2012	Canfield	United States	Canfield Fairgrounds
September 12, 2012	Puyallup	United States	Western Washington Fair
Europe
September 21, 2012	Gstaad	Switzerland	Menuhin Festival Gstaad
September 22, 2012	Gstaad	Switzerland	Menuhin Festival Gstaad
North America Leg 2
September 28, 2012	Nashville	United States	Ryman Auditorium
October 5, 2012	Lancaster	United States	American Music Theatre
October 6, 2012	Salamanca	United States	Seneca Allegany Casino & Hotel
October 12, 2012	Tunica	United States	Harrah's Casino – Tunica Event Center
October 14, 2012	Bossier City	United States	Horseshoe Bossier City
October 19, 2012	Greenville	United States	Peace Center for the Arts
October 20, 2012	Morgantown	United States	WVU Creative Arts Center
October 25, 2012	New York City	United States	Beacon Theatre
October 26, 2012	Upper Darby Township	United States	Tower Theatre
October 27, 2012	Toledo	United States	Stranahan Theatre
October 28, 2012	Jim Thorpe	United States	Penn's Peak
November 8, 2012	Carmel	United States	The Palladium
November 23, 2012	Atlanta	United States	Fox Theatre
November 24, 2012	Norfolk	United States	Old Dominion University
November 25, 2012	Roanoke	United States	Roanoke Civic Center
November 29, 2012	Green Bay	United States	Resch Center
