= Shake Up Christmas =

Single by Train

from the album Save Me, San Francisco and Christmas in Tahoe
- Released: November 1, 2010
- Recorded: 2009
- Genre: Pop rock; Christmas
- Length: 3:52
- Label: Columbia
- Songwriters: Butch Walker; Pat Monahan
- Producer: Butch Walker

Train singles chronology
"Marry Me" (2010)	"Shake Up Christmas" (2010)	"Save Me, San Francisco" (2011)

"Shake Up Christmas" is a song by the American rock band Train. It was released on November 1, 2010, as the fourth single from their fifth studio album, Save Me, San Francisco (2009). A different version of the song appears on the band's 2015 Christmas album, Christmas in Tahoe. The song was written by Butch Walker and Pat Monahan.

== Music video ==
A music video to accompany the release of "Shake Up Christmas" was first released onto YouTube on November 29, 2010, at a total length of four minutes and one second.

The song features Coca-Cola's jingle of the period, most prominently at the beginning, while the video shows Santa Claus drinking Coca-Cola and shaking a snow globe. Clips from the video were spliced into Christmas Coke commercials during December 2010.

== Track listing ==
Digital download

1. "Shake Up Christmas" (Coke Xmas Anthem) - 3:52

== Chart performance ==
Chart (2010–2023)	Peak position
Austria (Ö3 Austria Top 40)	14
Belgium (Ultratop 50 Flanders)	24
Belgium (Ultratop 50 Wallonia)	45
Canada Hot 100 (Billboard)	97
Croatia (HRT)	7
Czech Republic Airplay (ČNS IFPI)	16
Denmark (Tracklisten)	21
Hungary (Rádiós Top 40)	29
Hungary (Single Top 40)	19
Italy (FIMI)	11
Italian Airplay (EarOne)	26
Netherlands (Dutch Top 40)	6
Slovenia (SloTop50)	10
Switzerland (Schweizer Hitparade)	25
UK Singles (Official Charts Company)	134
US Billboard Hot 100	99
US Adult Contemporary (Billboard)	12

== Certifications ==
Region	Certification	Certified units/sales
Denmark (IFPI Danmark)	Platinum	90,000^{‡}
Germany (BVMI)	Gold	150,000^{‡}
United States (RIAA)	Gold	500,000^{‡}
^{‡} Sales+streaming figures based on certification alone.

== Release history ==
Country	Date	Format	Label
United States	1 November 2010	Digital download	Columbia Records
