= If It's Love (Train song) =

2010 single by Train

Single by Train

from the album Save Me, San Francisco
- Released: June 22, 2010
- Genre: Pop rock
- Length: 3:59
- Label: Columbia
- Songwriters: Pat Monahan; Gregg Wattenberg
- Producers: Espionage; Martin Terefe; Gregg Wattenberg

Train singles chronology
"Hey, Soul Sister" (2009)	"If It's Love" (2010)	"Marry Me" (2010)

Music video
- "If it's Love" on YouTube

"If It's Love" is the second single from Train's fifth studio album, Save Me, San Francisco (2009).

It debuted at No. 31 on Billboard's Hot Adult Top 40 Tracks chart. and has since become Train's second-consecutive No. 1 hit from the album, as well as their fourth No. 1 overall. This ties the band with Matchbox 20 and Daughtry for second-most chart-topping singles in format history, and trailing only Nickelback in total Adult Top 40 No. 1 placements. It is also the 100th single to go to No. 1 in the format's history.

In addition, it has reached No. 34 on the Billboard Hot 100.

A music video for the song debuted on VH1.com on May 11, 2010.

== Background ==
In a 2010 interview with The Post-Crescent, Pat Monahan confirmed "If It's Love" was written the same day as their hit "Hey, Soul Sister" and was intended as a thank-you song to long-time fans of the band:

This song was actually written on the same day as "Hey, Soul Sister" in New York City. I wrote this song first in the day, and I was thinking about all these people who have been supportive of the band Train for so many years. I had also made a solo record, and (fans) were really supportive to me and I was just like, "I wanna write a love song finally after all these years, but I wanna write it to our fans and just say thank you."

Much like "Hey, Soul Sister", the track features a handful of pop cultural references including Winger (an American hard rock band that enjoyed popularity in the late 80s and early 90s), and "The Rain in Spain" (a song featured in the musical My Fair Lady).

In addition, the lyrics "There's no happy endings, No Henry Lee" refer to the inscription and the main character in Jamie Ford's 2009 novel Hotel on the Corner of Bitter and Sweet.

In a 2010 interview, Monahan explained the lyric "I wanna buy you everything except cologne, 'cause it's poison."

Have you ever been in an elevator with a lady who just got done perfuming? If you have, you won't wonder why I wrote it.

In 2011, Slovenian media outlet 24ur reported similarities between "If It's Love" and "A veš", a song by Slovenian singer Alya, released in 2007. The band was then sued by Slovenian singer-songwriter Jan Plestenjak (the original author of the song) for copyright infringement, claiming the song's chorus was copied from his song "A veš". The matter was settled out of court for an undisclosed sum in June 2018.

== Music video ==
As with the origins of the song, the music video is a thank-you to the fans. It references what the band supposedly did during their three-year hiatus, including clips of Jimmy pawning a guitar, Scott panhandling, and Pat sitting in bed as Train appears on Where are They Now?. The video also features the band performing on a red carpet and at the Oakland Theater, and appearing in a commercial where Jimmy and Scott are wearing chicken suits. The video was directed by Pete Wentz and Bill Fishman, with a cameo appearance by Hugh Jackman.

== Chart performance ==
=== Weekly charts ===
Weekly chart performance for "If It's Love"
Chart (2010)	Peak position
Australia (ARIA)	21
Canada Hot 100 (Billboard)	60
New Zealand (Recorded Music NZ)	28
Slovakia Airplay (ČNS IFPI)	100
US Billboard Hot 100	34
US Adult Alternative Airplay (Billboard)	6
US Adult Contemporary (Billboard)	15
US Adult Pop Airplay (Billboard)	1
US Hot Rock & Alternative Songs (Billboard)	44
US Pop Airplay (Billboard)	19

=== Year-end charts ===
Year-end chart performance for "If It's Love"
Chart (2010)	Position
US Adult Contemporary (Billboard)	42
US Adult Top 40 (Billboard)	4

== Certifications ==
Region	Certification	Certified units/sales
Australia (ARIA)	Gold	35,000^{^}
United States (RIAA)	Platinum	1,000,000^{‡}
^{^} Shipments figures based on certification alone.^{‡} Sales+streaming figures based on certification alone.

== Release history ==
Release dates and formats for "If It's Love"
Region	Date	Format	Label(s)	Ref.
United States	June 28, 2010	Mainstream airplay	Columbia	
