= Save Me, San Francisco =

Studio album by Train
- Released: October 27, 2009
- Recorded: 2009
- Genres: Rock; roots rock; pop rock
- Length: 43:23
- Label: Columbia
- Producers: Bill Szymczyk; Martin Terefe; Gregg Wattenberg; S*A*M and Sluggo; Espionage

Train chronology
| For Me, It's You (2006) | Save Me, San Francisco (2009) | California 37 (2012) |

Singles from Save Me, San Francisco
- 1. "Hey, Soul Sister" Released: August 11, 2009; 2. "If It's Love" Released: June 22, 2010; 3. "Marry Me" Released: October 25, 2010; 4. "Shake Up Christmas" Released: November 1, 2010; 5. "Save Me, San Francisco" Released: April 25, 2011

Save Me, San Francisco is the fifth studio album by pop rock band Train (and the first of two albums recorded as a three-piece). It was released on October 27, 2009, through Columbia Records. The album was certified 3× Platinum by the Recording Industry Association of America on February 25, 2024.

The album's first single, "Hey, Soul Sister", which marked a return to the group's folk-rock roots, was released to digital retailers on August 11, 2009. The single has since become Train's fourth career Top 40 hit on the Billboard Hot 100 and second career top 10 hit, reaching number three 26 weeks after it was released. It is also the band's highest-peaking single to date in their native United States, as well as Canada, Australia, the Netherlands and New Zealand.

The follow-up single, "If It's Love", became Train's fourth-career chart-topping single on the Adult Top 40 and peaking at #34 on the Billboard Hot 100. "Marry Me" was released on October 25 as the third single from the record — it debuted on the Billboard Hot 100 at #95 and has reached #34. "Save Me, San Francisco" was released on April 25, 2011, as the fifth single from the record, and peaked at #75 on the Hot 100.

== Background ==
I don't think we knew what we were going to do. I don't think we knew if we were even going to come back at all. It was really kind of an unhealthy family at the time. We had to step back from it to realize what we really had there.

— Lead guitarist Jimmy Stafford, reflecting on tensions within the band between the "For Me, It's You" era and their hiatus.

Despite debuting in the Top Ten of the Billboard 200 and garnering numerous positive reviews, the band's previous album, For Me, It's You, was a commercial failure, lacking longevity on the aforementioned chart and being the first Train album to fail to garner an RIAA certification or spawn a Billboard Hot 100-charting single.

The band has since attributed the album's failure to resonate to listeners to their own internal struggles at the time. After considering breaking up altogether at one point, the band finally decided to take a hiatus and pursue solo projects. Lead singer and lyricist Pat Monahan recorded his debut solo record, Last of Seven, which was released in September 2007, shortly after the band went on hiatus. Despite garnering positive reviews, the album was a commercial failure, debuting and peaking at a disappointing #82 on the Billboard 200 composite chart.

In early 2009, in an effort to restore the band, the now-trio regrouped. Lead guitarist Jimmy Stafford reflected on their intentions at the time:

When we came back we wanted to just get back to the excitement we had in the very beginning of the band, so we had to make some changes. We needed to get back to the three core band members, change management, record the records in a different place, write with different people, kind of try and get that spark back.

The band spent five or six years living together in San Francisco, and that's where everything got started for us. We kind of felt like we needed to get back to what made us excited to be in this band in the beginning, and what made us happy to be doing this and working together, because you kind of take it for granted after a while. I think we had taken some things for granted and we weren't really enjoying it as much. It kind of turned into work, you know?

— Lead guitarist Jimmy Stafford.

After deciding to change management and restore the band to its core trio, the band found motivation in writing new songs; reportedly writing a total of 80. The band also made a habitual departure from collaborating with a sole producer each previous album era in deciding to record and collaborate with numerous producers, including famed producer and frontman of OneRepublic Ryan Tedder, Dave Katz and Sam Hollander of the 2008 Rolling Stone Hot List Producers of the Year-awarded recording duo S*A*M & Sluggo, and Espen Lind and Amund Bjørklund of the famed Norwegian producing duo Espionage, who produced and co-wrote the album's single "Hey, Soul Sister" and the album track "Brick by Brick".

Lead singer and lyricist Pat Monahan attributed the band's new-found momentum to approaching their work ethic with a happy disposition:

(It was), 'Let's just make this record from our hearts and not worry about the rest. Let's just do this because we love it.' When we started go from that angle, it made us make better music and write better songs, feel better about things. Before anyone heard the record we felt like we were successful. And for maybe the first time in our careers, we stopped trying to write hit songs and were coming from a place of love.

The recording sessions, according to the band, also marked a return to the band's roots; both musically as well as culturally to their native San Francisco:

So our goal with this record was to get back to our San Francisco vibe that we had when we made our first album. I think we're happier than we've ever been, we're more excited than we've ever been, and with that I think we're all feeling a lot more at home.

== Reception ==
Professional ratings
Review scores
| Source | Rating |
|---|---|
| AllMusic | 3/5 stars |
| The Hollywood Reporter | (positive) |
| PopMatters | (6/10) |

With their diminished commercial standing at the time of its release, Save Me San Francisco debuted at #17 on the Billboard 200, their first album not to debut in the chart's Top Ten since their self-titled debut release. The album quickly descended the chart in subsequent weeks until, at one point, it exited the Billboard 200 altogether.

However, buoyed by the breakout success of Train's biggest single to date ("Hey, Soul Sister"), the album enjoyed a resurgence; steadily climbing the Billboard 200 back to a position of #20 the chart week of August 21, 2010, 39 weeks after its release. The album is certified Gold by the RIAA, and has sold 954,000 copies as of April, 2012.

The album also enjoyed modest levels of international success to date. After their previous album For Me, It's You failed to chart the ARIA Albums chart altogether, Save Me, San Francisco reached a peak of #8 on the aforementioned chart: their best chart showing since Drops of Jupiter peaked at #3 in 2001.

== Track listing ==
| No. | Title | Writer(s) | Producer(s) | Length |
|---|---|---|---|---|
| 1. | "Save Me, San Francisco" | Patrick Monahan; Sam Hollander; Dave Katz | Martin Terefe; S*A*M and Sluggo | 4:09 |
| 2. | "Hey, Soul Sister" | Monahan; Espen Lind; Amund Bjørklund | Terefe; Espionage; Gregg Wattenberg | 3:36 |
| 3. | "I Got You" | Monahan; Kevin Griffin; Patrick Simmons | Terefe; S*A*M and Sluggo | 3:47 |
| 4. | "Parachute" | Monahan; Wattenberg | Wattenberg | 3:29 |
| 5. | "This Ain't Goodbye" | Monahan; Ryan Tedder | Terefe | 4:23 |
| 6. | "If It's Love" | Monahan; Wattenberg | Wattenberg; Terefe | 3:59 |
| 7. | "You Already Know" | Monahan; Wattenberg; Jimmy Stafford; Scott Underwood | Terefe | 4:40 |
| 8. | "Words" | Monahan; Jerry Becker; Luis Maldonado | Terefe | 3:27 |
| 9. | "Brick by Brick" | Monahan; Lind; Bjørklund | Terefe; Espionage | 3:37 |
| 10. | "Breakfast in Bed" | Monahan; Underwood | Terefe | 4:51 |
| 11. | "Marry Me" | Monahan | Terefe | 3:25 |

Golden Gate Edition bonus tracks
| No. | Title | Writer(s) | Length |
|---|---|---|---|
| 12. | "Shake Up Christmas" | Monahan; Butch Walker | 3:52 |
| 13. | "Half Moon Bay" | Monahan; Lind; Bjørklund; Geir Hvidsten | 3:55 |
| 14. | "The Finish Line" | Monahan; Sacha Skarbek | 3:43 |
| 15. | "Umbrella" (Rihanna cover) | Shawn Carter; Kuk Harrell; Terius Nash; Christopher "Tricky" Stewart | 4:20 |
| 16. | "Parachute" (alternate version) | Monahan; Wattenberg | 3:23 |
| 17. | "Marry Me" (First Dance Mix) | Monahan | 3:31 |
| Total length: | | | 66:07 |

UK bonus track
| No. | Title | Writer(s) | Length |
|---|---|---|---|
| 12. | "Drops of Jupiter (Tell Me)" (live) | Monahan; Underwood; Stafford; Charlie Colin; Rob Hotchkiss | 4:21 |
| Total length: | | | 47:44 |

Notes

- "I Got You" contains elements of "Black Water" as written by Patrick Simmons, and performed by The Doobie Brothers.

== Personnel ==
Train

- Pat Monahan - lead and backing vocals
- Jimmy Stafford - guitars
- Scott Underwood - drums & percussion

Additional musicians

- Sean Gould - bass & slide guitar on track 1
- Claes Bjorklund - various keyboards on tracks 1, 2, 3, 7, 8 & 10, synthesizers on track 5, programming on track 7, piano & Mellotron on track 11
- Sakai - backing vocals on tracks 1 & 8
- Nikita Germaine - backing vocals on tracks 1 & 8
- Jerry Becker - honky piano on track 1, Hammond organ on track 2, various keyboards on tracks 4 & 6, piano on track 5
- The Ghost Of Harlem Keyboards - piano on track 1
- Martin Terefe - bass on tracks 2, 3, 5, 7, 8 & 10
- Espen Lind - ukulele & keyboards on track 2, piano & bass guitar on track 9
- Gregg Wattenberg - bass on track 4
- Andreas Olsson - programming on track 5
- Josh Berger - bass on track 6
- Nikolaj Torp - Hammond organ on track 8
- The Lovesponge Strings - strings on tracks 5, 6, 8 & 9
- David Davidson - violin & string arrangements on tracks 5, 6, 8 & 9
- David Angell - violin on tracks 5, 6, 8 & 9
- Kristin Wilkinson - viola on tracks 5, 6, 8 & 9
- Sarighani Reist - cello on tracks 5, 6, 8 & 9

Production

- Mark Endert - mixing
- Ted Jensen - mastering at Sterling Sound in New York, NY

== Chart performance ==
=== Weekly charts ===
Weekly chart performance for Save Me, San Francisco
| Chart (2009–2010) | Peak position |
|---|---|
| Australian Albums (ARIA) | 8 |
| Austrian Albums (Ö3 Austria) | 27 |
| Belgian Albums (Ultratop Flanders) | 75 |
| Dutch Albums (Album Top 100) | 13 |
| French Albums (SNEP) | 35 |
| German Albums (Offizielle Top 100) | 43 |
| Irish Albums (IRMA) | 19 |
| Italian Albums (FIMI) | 64 |
| New Zealand Albums (RMNZ) | 21 |
| Scottish Albums (Official Charts) | 20 |
| Swiss Albums (Schweizer Hitparade) | 34 |
| UK Albums (Official Charts) | 33 |
| US Billboard 200 | 17 |
| US Top Rock Albums (Billboard) | 3 |

=== Year-end charts ===
2010 year-end chart performance for Save Me, San Francisco
| Chart (2010) | Position |
|---|---|
| Australian Albums (ARIA) | 30 |
| Dutch Albums (Album Top 100) | 82 |
| US Billboard 200 | 57 |
| US Top Rock Albums (Billboard) | 8 |

2011 year-end chart performance for Save Me, San Francisco
| Chart (2011) | Position |
|---|---|
| US Billboard 200 | 79 |
| US Top Rock Albums (Billboard) | 10 |

== Certifications ==
Certifications for Save Me, San Francisco
| Region | Certification | Certified units/sales |
|---|---|---|
| Australia (ARIA) | Platinum | 70,000^{^} |
| Canada (Music Canada) | Gold | 40,000^{^} |
| Denmark (IFPI Danmark) Golden Gate edition | Gold | 10,000^{‡} |
| New Zealand (RMNZ) | 2× Platinum | 30,000^{‡} |
| United Kingdom (BPI) | Gold | 100,000^{^} |
| United States (RIAA) | 3× Platinum | 3,000,000^{‡} |
^{^} Shipments figures based on certification alone.^{‡} Sales+streaming figures based on certification alone.
