= List of Billboard Adult Contemporary number ones of 2011 =

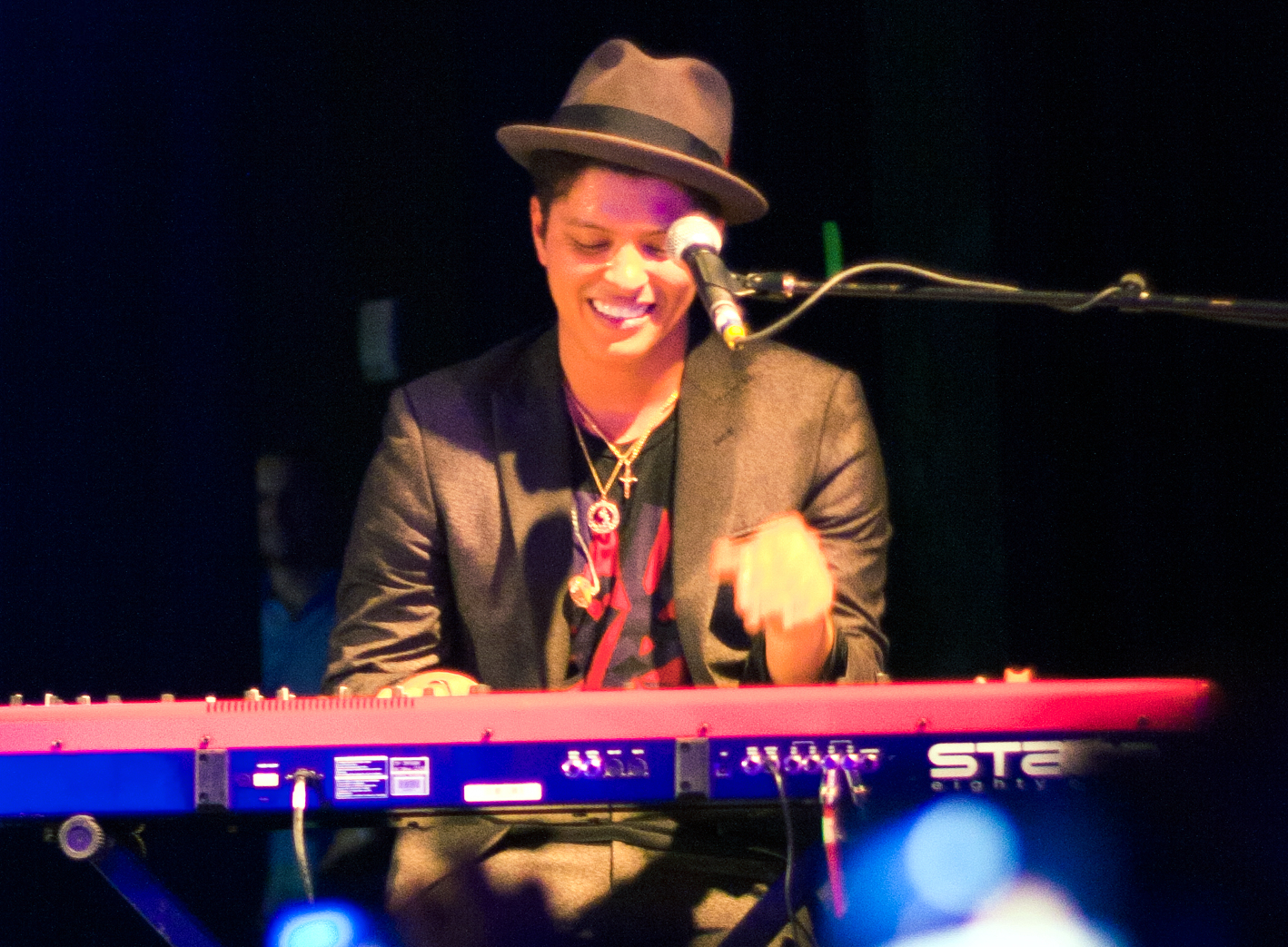
Bruno Mars' song "Just the Way You Are" spent a total of 20 weeks at number one on the Adult Contemporary chart.

Adult Contemporary is a chart published by Billboard ranking the top-performing songs in the United States in the adult contemporary music (AC) market. In 2011, eight different songs topped the chart in 52 issues of the magazine, based on weekly airplay data from radio stations compiled by Nielsen Broadcast Data Systems.

On the first chart of the year, the number one spot was held by Mariah Carey with "Oh Santa!", the song's third consecutive week at number one. It remained at the top of the chart for one further week before being replaced by the band Train's song "Hey, Soul Sister". Train's song had spent 19 weeks at number one during the previous year, and its return to the top spot took its total of 22 weeks at number one, the second-highest figure at the time for the AC listing behind only Uncle Kracker's version of "Drift Away", which spent 28 weeks in the top spot in 2003 and 2004.

Two artists held the top spot between them from early February to early November, with the exception of a single week. Bruno Mars topped the chart for 20 non-consecutive weeks with "Just the Way You Are" and Adele spent 19 consecutive weeks at number one with "Rolling in the Deep". Both songs also topped Billboard's all-genres chart, the Hot 100, as did Katy Perry's "Firework", the only song to interrupt Mars and Adele's nine-month domination of the AC number one position. All three songs topped the AC chart several months after peaking on the Hot 100, reflecting a trend for songs to cross over to the slower-moving adult contemporary radio format after their pop success had peaked. "Just the Way You Are"'s 20-week run at number one set a new record for the longest spell atop the AC chart by an artist's debut single, breaking a record previously jointly held by Colbie Caillat and Daniel Powter. Adele returned to the top spot for a single week in the issue of Billboard dated December 3 with "Someone like You", making her the only artist to have two AC number ones in 2011, and tying Mars for the highest number of weeks spent at number one by an act during the year. Having begun with a Christmas-themed song by Mariah Carey at number one, 2011 ended with a cover version of another in the top spot, as Michael Bublé's recording of Carey's 1994 song "All I Want for Christmas Is You" topped the chart for the last four weeks of the year. The song was part of a long-running trend of Christmas-themed songs topping the AC chart at the end of the year, reflecting the fact that adult contemporary radio stations usually switch to playing exclusively festive songs in December.

== Chart history ==
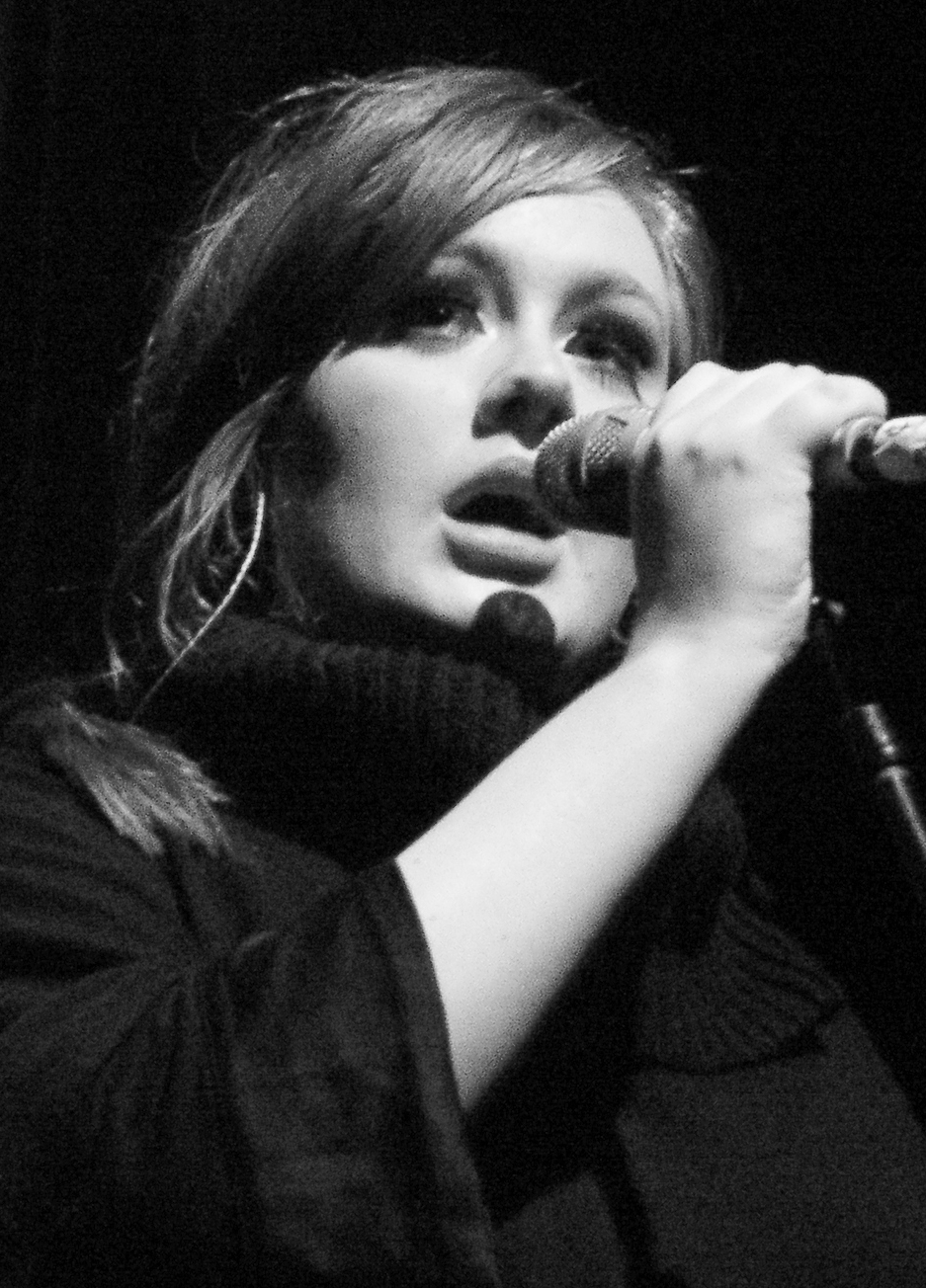
Adele's "Rolling in the Deep" topped the chart for 19 weeks.

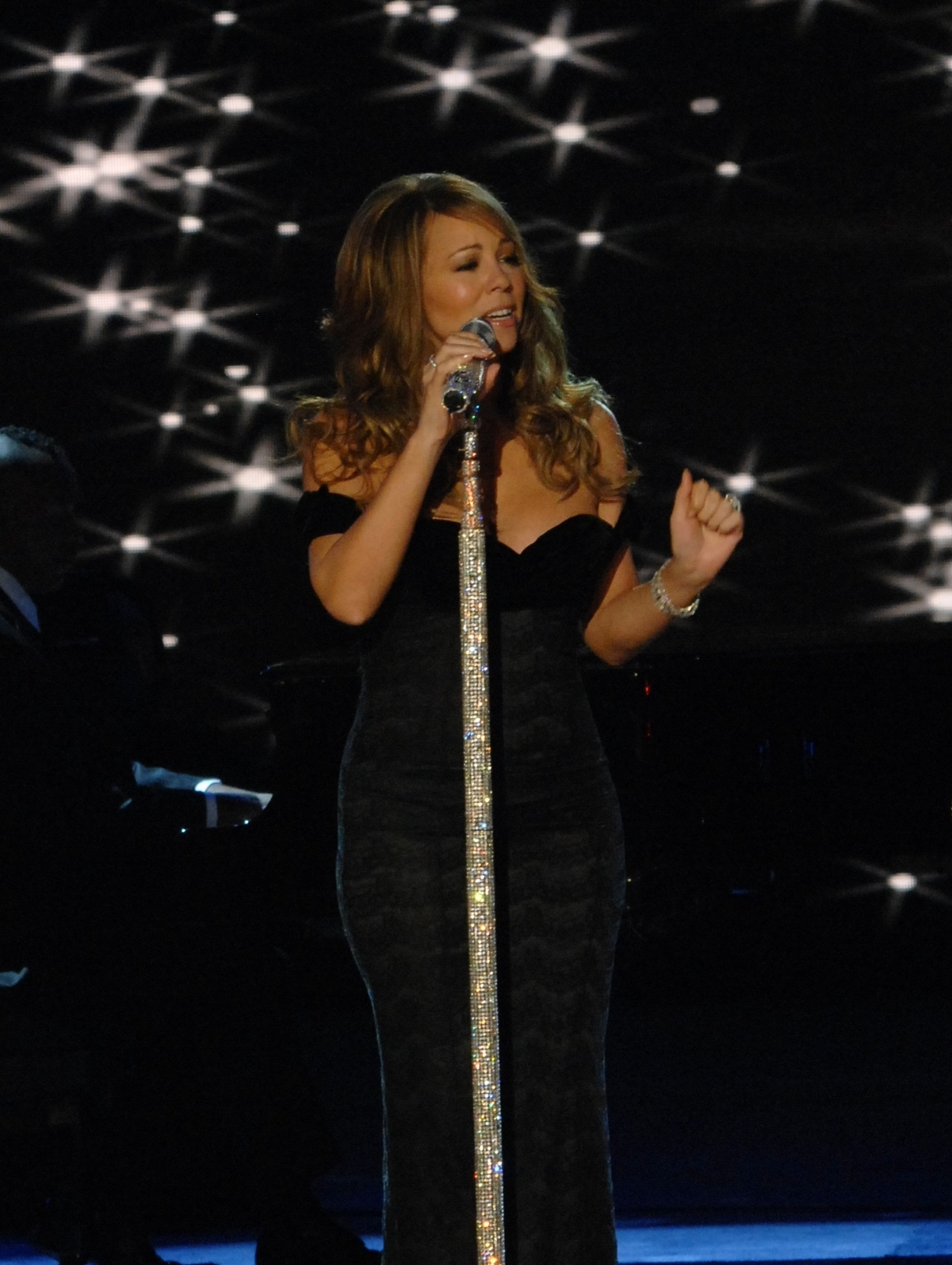
Mariah Carey topped the chart with her Christmas song "Oh Santa!" for the first two weeks of January 2011.

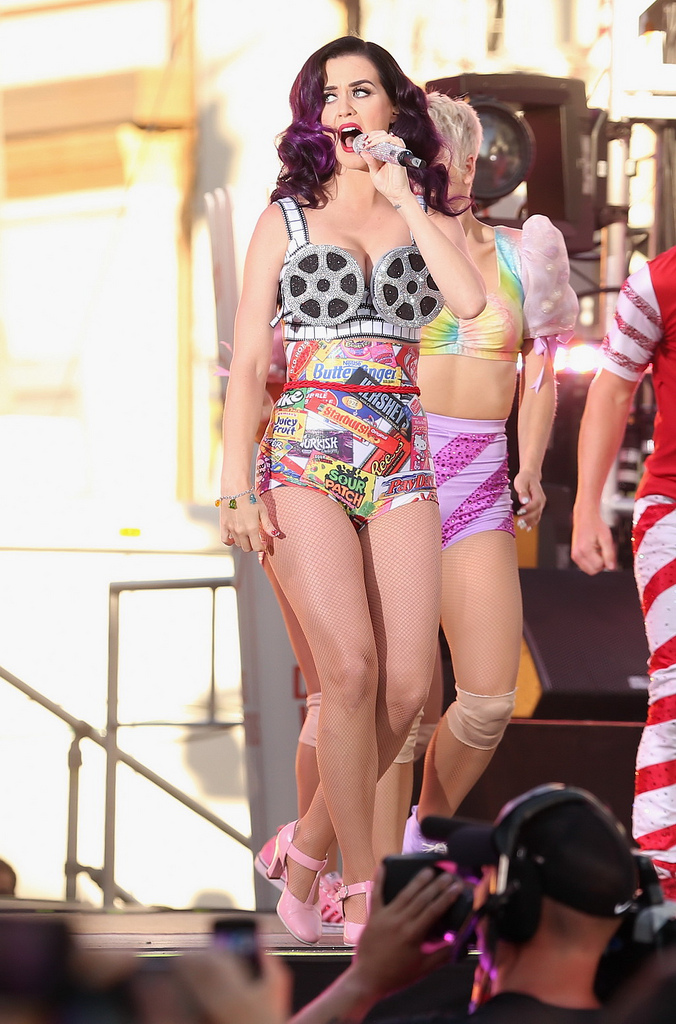
Katy Perry topped the chart for one week with "Firework".

Key
†	Indicates best-performing AC song of 2011

Issue date	Title	Artist(s)	Ref.
January 1	"Oh Santa!"	Mariah Carey	
January 8	"Oh Santa!"	Mariah Carey	
January 15	"Hey, Soul Sister"	Train	
January 22	"Hey, Soul Sister"	Train	
January 29	"Hey, Soul Sister"	Train	
February 5	"Just the Way You Are" †	Bruno Mars	
February 12	"Just the Way You Are" †	Bruno Mars	
February 19	"Just the Way You Are" †	Bruno Mars	
February 26	"Just the Way You Are" †	Bruno Mars	
March 5	"Just the Way You Are" †	Bruno Mars	
March 12	"Just the Way You Are" †	Bruno Mars	
March 19	"Just the Way You Are" †	Bruno Mars	
March 26	"Just the Way You Are" †	Bruno Mars	
April 2	"Just the Way You Are" †	Bruno Mars	
April 9	"Just the Way You Are" †	Bruno Mars	
April 16	"Just the Way You Are" †	Bruno Mars	
April 23	"Just the Way You Are" †	Bruno Mars	
April 30	"Just the Way You Are" †	Bruno Mars	
May 7	"Just the Way You Are" †	Bruno Mars	
May 14	"Just the Way You Are" †	Bruno Mars	
May 21	"Just the Way You Are" †	Bruno Mars	
May 28	"Firework"	Katy Perry	
June 4	"Just the Way You Are" †	Bruno Mars	
June 11	"Just the Way You Are" †	Bruno Mars	
June 18	"Just the Way You Are" †	Bruno Mars	
June 25	"Just the Way You Are" †	Bruno Mars	
July 2	"Rolling in the Deep"	Adele	
July 9	"Rolling in the Deep"	Adele	
July 16	"Rolling in the Deep"	Adele	
July 23	"Rolling in the Deep"	Adele	
July 30	"Rolling in the Deep"	Adele	
August 6	"Rolling in the Deep"	Adele	
August 13	"Rolling in the Deep"	Adele	
August 20	"Rolling in the Deep"	Adele	
August 27	"Rolling in the Deep"	Adele	
September 3	"Rolling in the Deep"	Adele	
September 10	"Rolling in the Deep"	Adele	
September 17	"Rolling in the Deep"	Adele	
September 24	"Rolling in the Deep"	Adele	
October 1	"Rolling in the Deep"	Adele	
October 8	"Rolling in the Deep"	Adele	
October 15	"Rolling in the Deep"	Adele	
October 22	"Rolling in the Deep"	Adele	
October 29	"Rolling in the Deep"	Adele	
November 5	"Rolling in the Deep"	Adele	
November 12	"If I Die Young"	The Band Perry	
November 19	"If I Die Young"	The Band Perry	
November 26	"If I Die Young"	The Band Perry	
December 3	"Someone like You"	Adele	
December 10	"All I Want for Christmas Is You"	Michael Bublé	
December 17	"All I Want for Christmas Is You"	Michael Bublé	
December 24	"All I Want for Christmas Is You"	Michael Bublé	
December 31	"All I Want for Christmas Is You"	Michael Bublé	

== See also ==
- 2011 in music
- List of artists who reached number one on the U.S. Adult Contemporary chart
