= Marry Me (Train song) =

2010 single by Train

Single by Train

from the album Save Me, San Francisco
- Released: October 27, 2010
- Recorded: 2009
- Genre: Pop rock
- Length: 3:25
- Label: Columbia
- Songwriter: Pat Monahan
- Producer: Martin Terefe

Train singles chronology
"If It's Love" (2010)	"Marry Me" (2010)	"Shake Up Christmas" (2011)

Music video
- "Train - Marry Me" on YouTube

"Marry Me" is a song written by Pat Monahan and recorded by the group Train, for their fifth studio album Save Me, San Francisco (2009). The song was released on October 25, 2010 as the album's third single. The single peaked in the top 40 on the Billboard Hot 100, marking the first time the band has had three consecutive top 40 hits and also had three songs from one album chart on the Hot 100.

It performed well on adult contemporary radio, where it peaked within the top 5 of the Billboard Adult Contemporary chart and the Adult Pop Songs chart.

== Background ==
Lead singer and songwriter of Train, Pat Monahan stated in several interviews that the song was initially a very short tune, consisting only of a verse and a chorus, but he was later influenced to continue on with the song to capitalize on the initial simple beauty of the song.

== Music video ==
The music video for the song was directed by Lex Halaby. It was posted to YouTube on December 12, 2010, and released to the public by early January 2011.

The concept of the video consists of three main outlets - it starts off with separate shots of different couples sitting on a couch and reminiscing about the start of their relationships and the details of how they met. The rest of the video alternates between two different environments, starting with a diner in which a love at first sight moment occurs between Pat Monahan and the waitress of the diner, played by Anna Camp, when their eyes meet.

The second alternate environment is the band performing the song, with drummer Scott Underwood on piano and Jimmy Stafford on guitar, with a gray background.

The story of the video progresses with the waitress looking at the table where Pat was sitting only to find that he has left, causing her to become regretful of not taking a chance to talk to Pat. The waitress eventually runs out of the diner, hoping that her true love has not gone far, but is disappointed to realize that that is not the case. She then returns to the table where Pat was sitting and finds that he's left his hat. She looks up to see Pat return to the diner, their eyes meet, and he smiles. The final shot of the video depicts two steaming cups of coffee on either side of a table in the diner.

== Charts ==
"Marry Me" debuted at number 95 on the Billboard Hot 100 and reached number 34. In April 2011, the single topped 1,000,000 in digital downloads.

=== Weekly charts ===
Chart (2010–2011)	Peak position
Canada Hot 100 (Billboard)	47
Canada AC (Billboard)	17
Canada Hot AC (Billboard)	34
US Billboard Hot 100	34
US Adult Alternative Airplay (Billboard)	8
US Adult Contemporary (Billboard)	3
US Adult Pop Airplay (Billboard)	4
US Pop Airplay (Billboard)	27

=== Year-end charts ===
Chart (2011)	Position
US Adult Contemporary (Billboard)	6
US Adult Top 40 (Billboard)	18

== Certifications ==
Certifications for "Marry Me"
Region	Certification	Certified units/sales
New Zealand (RMNZ)	Gold	15,000^{‡}
United Kingdom (BPI)	Silver	200,000^{‡}
United States (RIAA)	4× Platinum	4,000,000^{‡}
^{‡} Sales+streaming figures based on certification alone.

== Release history ==
Release dates and formats for "Marry Me"
Region	Date	Format	Label(s)	Ref.
United States	January 18, 2011	Mainstream airplay	Columbia	

== Martina McBride version ==
"Marry Me"

Single by Martina McBride featuring Pat Monahan

from the album Eleven
- Released: March 26, 2012
- Recorded: 2011
- Genre: Country
- Length: 3:46
- Label: Republic Nashville
- Songwriter: Pat Monahan
- Producers: Martina McBride; Byron Gallimore

Martina McBride singles chronology
"I'm Gonna Love You Through It" (2011)	"Marry Me" (2012)	"Reckless" (2016)

Pat Monahan singles chronology
"The Truth" (2010)	"Marry Me" (2012)

Country music artist Martina McBride recorded a duet version with Pat Monahan for her eleventh studio album, Eleven. It was released as the third single from the album on March 26, 2012.

=== Chart performance ===
Chart (2012)	Peak position
US Hot Country Songs (Billboard)	45
