= Teenage Daughters =

Single by Martina McBride

from the album Eleven
- Released: March 21, 2011
- Genre: Country
- Length: 4:07
- Label: Republic Nashville
- Songwriter: Martina McBride; Brad Warren; Brett Warren
- Producer: Martina McBride; Byron Gallimore

Martina McBride singles chronology
"Wrong Baby Wrong" (2010)	"Teenage Daughters" (2011)	"I'm Gonna Love You Through It" (2011)

Music video
- "Teenage Daughters" on YouTube

"Teenage Daughters" is a song co-written and recorded by American country music artist Martina McBride. It is her first single for Republic Nashville. It was released in March 2011 as the lead-off single from her album Eleven, which was released on October 11, 2011.

== History ==
McBride wrote the song with The Warren Brothers (Brad and Brett Warren). She told Country Weekly magazine that they decided to write the song after talking with the Warrens about her oldest daughter, Delaney. She said, "I was just saying how one minute you are everything to them[…]and the next minute it's just a whole different thing." After saying that, she decided that they should write about having a teenage daughter. The song was released to the iTunes Store on March 29, 2011, the day that McBride's middle daughter, Emma, turned 13.

McBride co-wrote "Teenage Daughters" and seven other songs on the album. She said that after having a top five hit with "Anyway", the first single release that she ever co-wrote, she decided to co-write more frequently.

== Critical reception ==
The song was met with mixed reviews by critics. Matt Bjorke of Roughstock rated it four stars out of five, calling it "a song that any parent[…]can relate to" and saying that it "doesn’t fall into the dramatic melisma-filled type of song that was so often sent out to radio over the years." Blake Boldt of Engine 145 gave the song a "thumbs down." His review praises the song's lyrics for being "a witty and accurate portrayal of what it means to be a parent," but criticized the "misplaced" production and McBride's "whiny, exaggerated" singing.

== Music video ==
The music video shows McBride as the mother of two teenage daughters in the 1950s, the 1970s, the 1980s, and the present day. McBride's husband and daughters appear in the video, and it was directed by Roman White.

== Chart performance ==
Chart (2011)	Peak position
Canada Country (Billboard)	33
US Billboard Hot 100	100
US Hot Country Songs (Billboard)	17

=== Year-end charts ===
Chart (2011)	Position
US Country Songs (Billboard)	77
