= Last of Seven =

Studio album by Pat Monahan
- Released: September 18, 2007
- Genre: Rock, soul
- Length: 48:12
- Label: Columbia
- Producer: Patrick Leonard

Pat Monahan chronology
Last of Seven (2007)	Last of Seven Acoustic (2008)

Professional ratings
Review scores
Source	Rating
AllMusic	4.5/5 stars
Rolling Stone	3/5 stars

Last of Seven is the debut solo studio album by Pat Monahan, lead singer of the band Train. The album was released on September 18, 2007. Notable guest appearances include Brandi Carlile, who joins Monahan on the ballad, "Pirate on the Run," while Graham Nash sings backup on "Cowboys and Indians," and Bon Jovi guitarist Richie Sambora plays on "Someday."

The album's first single, "Her Eyes", was released to radio in July 2007. It has received some airplay on satellite radio stations, The Pulse on Sirius, and Flight 26 on XM. Monahan performed the song with his touring band on The Tonight Show with Jay Leno on October 2, 2007.

== Track listing ==
All lyrics are written by Pat Monahan; all music is composed by Pat Monahan and Patrick Leonard, except where noted.

No.	Title	Length
1.	"Last of Seven"	0:41
2.	"Her Eyes" (Monahan, Leonard, John Shanks)	3:16
3.	"Two Ways to Say Goodbye" (Monahan)	3:42
4.	"Someday"	3:28
5.	"Cowboys and Indians" (Monahan, Leonard, Lyle Workman)	3:57
6.	"Ooh My My"	3:30
7.	"Thinkin' 'Bout You"	4:22
8.	"Raise Your Hands"	3:19
9.	"Always Midnight"	3:19
10.	"Great Escape" (Monahan, James Bourne)	4:10
11.	"Ripple in the Water"	3:27
12.	"Girlfriend" (Monahan, Leonard, Luis Carlos Maldonado)	3:59
13.	"Pirate on the Run" (Monahan, Brandon Bush)	2:52
14.	"Shine" (Monahan)	4:10

iTunes bonus track
No.	Title	Length
15.	"Love Is a Ladder"	3:28
Total length:		51:40

== Charts ==
=== Album ===
Year	Chart	Position
2007	Billboard Top 200 Albums	82

=== Singles ===
Year	Single	Chart	Position
2007	"Her Eyes"	Billboard Adult Contemporary	9
2007	"Her Eyes"	Billboard Bubbling Under Hot 100 Singles	10
