= I'm Gonna Love You Through It =

Single by Martina McBride

from the album Eleven
- Released: July 25, 2011
- Genre: Country
- Length: 3:49
- Label: Republic Nashville
- Songwriters: Ben Hayslip; Sonya Isaacs; Jimmy Yeary
- Producers: Martina McBride; Byron Gallimore

Martina McBride singles chronology
"Teenage Daughters" (2011)	"I'm Gonna Love You Through It" (2011)	"Marry Me" (2012)

Music video
- "I'm Gonna Love You Through It" on YouTube

"I'm Gonna Love You Through It" is a song by American country music artist Martina McBride. The song was written by Ben Hayslip, Sonya Isaacs, and Jimmy Yeary while it was produced by McBride and Byron Gallimore. It was released to country radio on July 25, 2011 through Republic Nashville, and would be given a digital release on August 19. It was the second single from her eleventh studio album Eleven (2011).

The song was universally praised by critics upon release. It reached a peak of number four on the US Hot Country Songs chart in early 2012, becoming McBride's 20th and last top ten country hit to date and her first since 2006's "Anyway". It would later be nominated at the 54th Annual Grammy Awards in 2012 for Best Country Solo Performance.

== Content ==
The song is about a 38-year-old woman who is supported by her husband while battling breast cancer. The subject of the song survives. Co-writer Sonya Isaacs' inspiration for the song was her mother, Lily, who is a breast cancer survivor. It is in F major with an approximate tempo of 70 beats per minute, a vocal range of F3-D5 and a main chord pattern of F2-B♭2-F2.

== Critical reception ==
Amanda Hensel of Taste of Country gave the song five stars out of five, saying that McBride "captures our hearts with this one, reminding us why she's one of the best in the business." Matt Bjorke of Roughstock also gave the song a positive review, writing that it has "all the hallmarks of her best and most powerful tunes."

== Commercial performance ==
"I'm Gonna Love You Through It" debuted at number 50 on the US Billboard Hot Country Songs chart the week of August 6, 2011, debuting with 621,000 impressions and becoming the "Hot Shot Debut" of the week. In its sixth week on the Hot 100, the song ascended to number 42. The song would enter the top ten the week of January 28, 2012 at number ten, becoming McBride's first top ten single since "Anyway" peaked at number five in 2007; McBride had two close calls in 2009 and 2010 with "Ride" and "Wrong Baby Wrong Baby Wrong" both peaking at number eleven. It would reach number four on the chart the week of March 10, 2012, becoming her highest peaking single since "In My Daughter's Eyes" also reached the position in 2004. It spent 33 weeks in total, tying with "I Love You" (1999) to being her longest charting single. It is also her 20th and final top ten hit on the chart. As of October 2015, the song has sold 561,000 copies in the United States and has been certified Gold by the RIAA.

At the 54th Annual Grammy Awards on February 12, 2012, "I'm Gonna Love You Through It" was nominated for Best Country Solo Performance, becoming McBride's 14th nomination. She would lose the category to Taylor Swift's "Mean" and it is to date her last song to be nominated. With 14 nominations, McBride holds the record of being the fourth most nominated artist of all time at the Grammy Awards to never win one, behind Dierks Bentley (15), Björk (16, tied), Snoop Dogg (16, tied), and Brian McKnight (17).

== Music video ==
The music video was directed by Roman White and premiered in August 2011. It features appearances from cancer survivors Sheryl Crow, Robin Roberts and Hoda Kotb and cancer activist Katie Couric.

== Charts ==
Chart (2011–2012)	Peak position
Canada Country (Billboard)	28
US Hot Country Songs (Billboard)	4
US Billboard Hot 100	61

=== Year-end charts ===
Chart (2011)	Position
US Country Songs (Billboard)	93

Chart (2012)	Position
US Country Songs (Billboard)	45
