= Sonya Isaacs =

American singer-songwriter

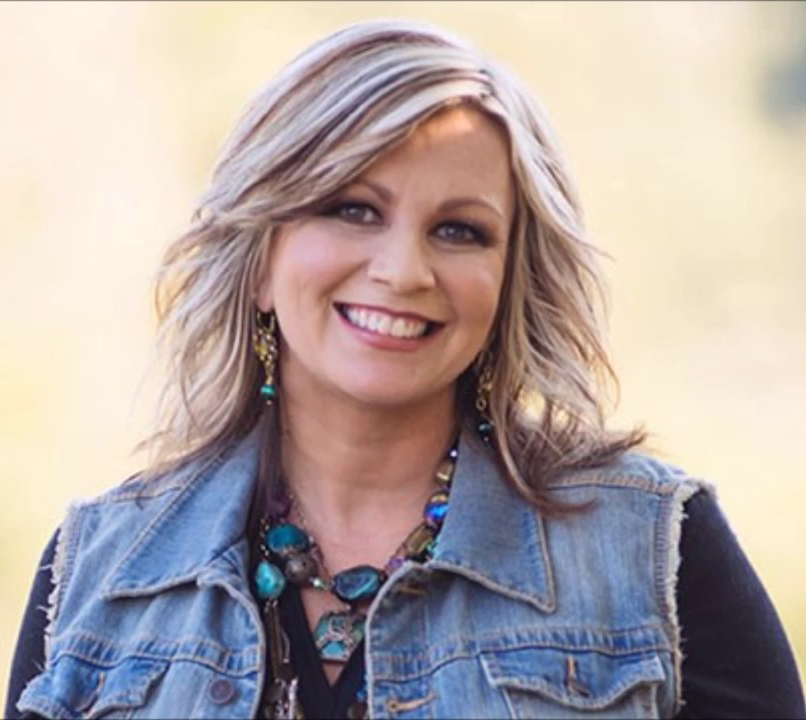

Background information
- Born: Sonya Melissa Isaacs; July 22, 1974 (age 52)
- Origin: LaFollette, Tennessee, U.S.
- Genres: Bluegrass, and Southern Gospel
- Occupations: Singer, songwriter
- Instruments: Vocals, mandolin
- Years active: 1999–present
- Label: Lyric Street
- Member of: The Isaacs
- Spouse: Jimmy Yeary (m. 2009)

Sonya Melissa Isaacs (born July 22, 1974) is an American country, bluegrass gospel and Christian music singer. Isaacs grew up near Morrow, Ohio, and graduated from Little Miami High School in 1992. Her maternal grandparents are Polish Jewish Holocaust survivors and were liberated from a concentration camp in Germany in 1945.

She has released one album on Lyric Street Records, and has charted five singles on the Billboard Hot Country Songs charts. Three were included on her self-titled debut album, released in 2000. A fourth was a Christmas single included on the label's multi-artist collection No Wrapping Required: A Christmas Album. Her highest-charting single, "No Regrets Yet", peaked at number 36 on the country charts but did not appear on an album.

She parted ways with Lyric Street in 2004. Isaacs, along with several of her family members, also comprise a gospel music band called The Isaacs. Sonya recorded the song "The Battlefield" for the soundtrack to the 2006 film Broken Bridges. She and Vince Gill contributed guest vocals to a cover of "Misty" on Cledus T. Judd's 2007 tribute album Boogity, Boogity – A Tribute to the Comedic Genius of Ray Stevens.

She also sang a duet with Dolly Parton to "The Angels Rejoiced".

Isaacs married singer-songwriter Jimmy Yeary on December 20, 2009, with whom she co-wrote Martina McBride's 2011 single "I'm Gonna Love You Through It".

Isaacs and Yeary have two sons born in 2011 and 2015, and a daughter born in 2017.

As a member of The Isaacs, Isaacs became a member of the Grand Ole Opry in 2021.

== Discography ==
=== Albums ===
Title	Album details
Sonya Isaacs	Released: October 10, 2000; Label: Lyric Street; Format: CD

=== Singles ===
Single	Year	Peak positions		Album
Single	Year	US Country	CAN Country	Album
"On My Way to You"	1999	54	—	Sonya Isaacs
"I've Forgotten How You Feel"	1999	46	58	Sonya Isaacs
"Since I Gave My Heart Away"	2000	—	—	Geppetto
"Barefoot in the Grass"	2000	64	—	Sonya Isaacs
"How Can I Forget"	2000	—	—	Sonya Isaacs
"Baby Don't You Let Go"	2002	—	—	Non-album single
"No Regrets Yet"	2003	36	—	Non-album single
"—" denotes releases that did not chart

=== Other charted songs ===
Year	Single	Peak positions	Album
Year	Single	US Country	Album
2002	"What Do You See"	59	No Wrapping Required: A Christmas Album

=== Music videos ===
Year	Video	Director
1999	"On My Way to You"	David Hogan
2000	"Since I Gave My Heart Away"	
2000	"How Can I Forget"	Shaun Silva
