= Pat Monahan =

American singer and songwriter (born 1969)

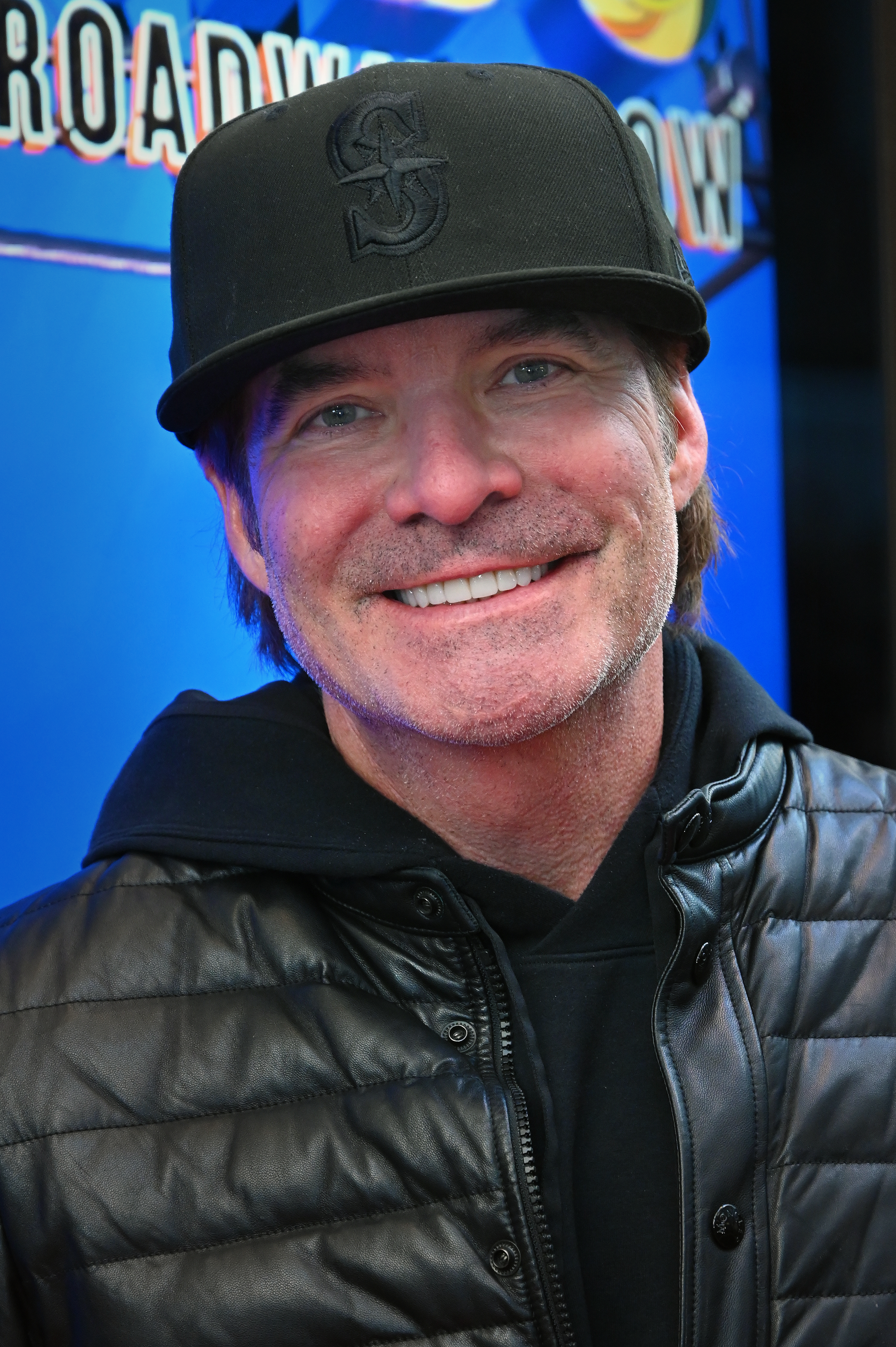
- Monahan in 2025

Background information
- Born: Patrick Monahan; February 28, 1969 (age 57); Erie, Pennsylvania, U.S.
- Genres: Rock; roots rock; pop rock
- Occupations: Singer; songwriter; musician
- Instruments: Vocals; guitar; drums; trumpet; saxophone
- Years active: 1988–present
- Member of: Train

Signature
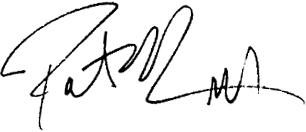

Patrick Monahan (born February 28, 1969) is an American singer and songwriter. He is best known as the lead singer and sole constant member of the band Train. He has also collaborated with multiple artists and has recorded a solo album, Last of Seven.

== Early life, family and education ==
Monahan was born and raised in Erie, Pennsylvania. He is the son of Jack Monahan, a clothing store owner and musician, and Patricia Ann (née Timon) Monahan. Of Irish descent, Monahan is the youngest of seven children; by the time he was five years old, he had already become an uncle.

Monahan attended McDowell High School in Millcreek Township. After graduating, he went on to attend Edinboro University of Pennsylvania in nearby Edinboro.

== Career ==
Monahan began his musical career singing with cover band Rogues Gallery from 1988 to 1990. The band consisted of Monahan (lead vocals, percussion), Mark Emhoff (lead guitar, vocals), Mike Imboden (bass, keyboards, vocals), John McElhenny (drums, vocals) and his brother Matt (rhythm guitar, keyboards and vocals), in his hometown of Erie, Pennsylvania.

After the dissolution of the band, he left Erie in late 1993 and moved to California, where he met Rob Hotchkiss. While progressing from the SF coffeehouse circuit to the LA club scene, Monahan and Hotchkiss added Jimmy Stafford (guitar), Charlie Colin (bass), and Scott Underwood (drums) to their lineup, thus officially forming Train. From 1994 to 2006, Monahan released four studio albums with Train. In 2002, the band earned two Grammys, one of them for the song "Drops of Jupiter (Tell Me)", which was written by Monahan and inspired by his late mother, who had died of cancer.

Aside from his work with Train, Monahan also sang additional vocals on the song "Shimmer" with the band Fuel in 2001. In November 2005, he appeared as a guest vocalist on VH1's Decades Rock Live!, where he covered Cyndi Lauper's hit single "Time After Time". Later, he took part in Storytellers – The Doors: A Celebration, paying tribute to the Doors by performing "Love Me Two Times".

From 2006 to 2009, Train was on a three-year hiatus. Monahan released his first solo album, Last of Seven, on September 18, 2007, and began a nationwide tour supporting it. He followed that tour with a small, intimate acoustic tour, which inspired his Last of Seven Acoustic compilation, available via digital download only. His first solo single, "Her Eyes", made the top 10 of Billboard's Hot AC chart. The album's second single was "Two Ways to Say Goodbye". On Last of Seven, Monahan duets with folk rock musician Brandi Carlile, with special guest appearances by Richie Sambora and Graham Nash. Monahan worked with Guy Chambers to co-write two songs for Tina Turner's hits album, Tina!: Her Greatest Hits.

In 2009, Train returned to the studio with the album Save Me, San Francisco. That same year, Monahan and some of his fellow Train bandmates landed small acting roles in the CSI: NY episode "Second Chances". Monahan played a former homeless drug addict Sam Baker (dating Debbie Fallon, portrayed by Kim Kardashian) who becomes involved in a murder investigation. Train performed the song "Hey, Soul Sister" from their new album, and "Calling All Angels".

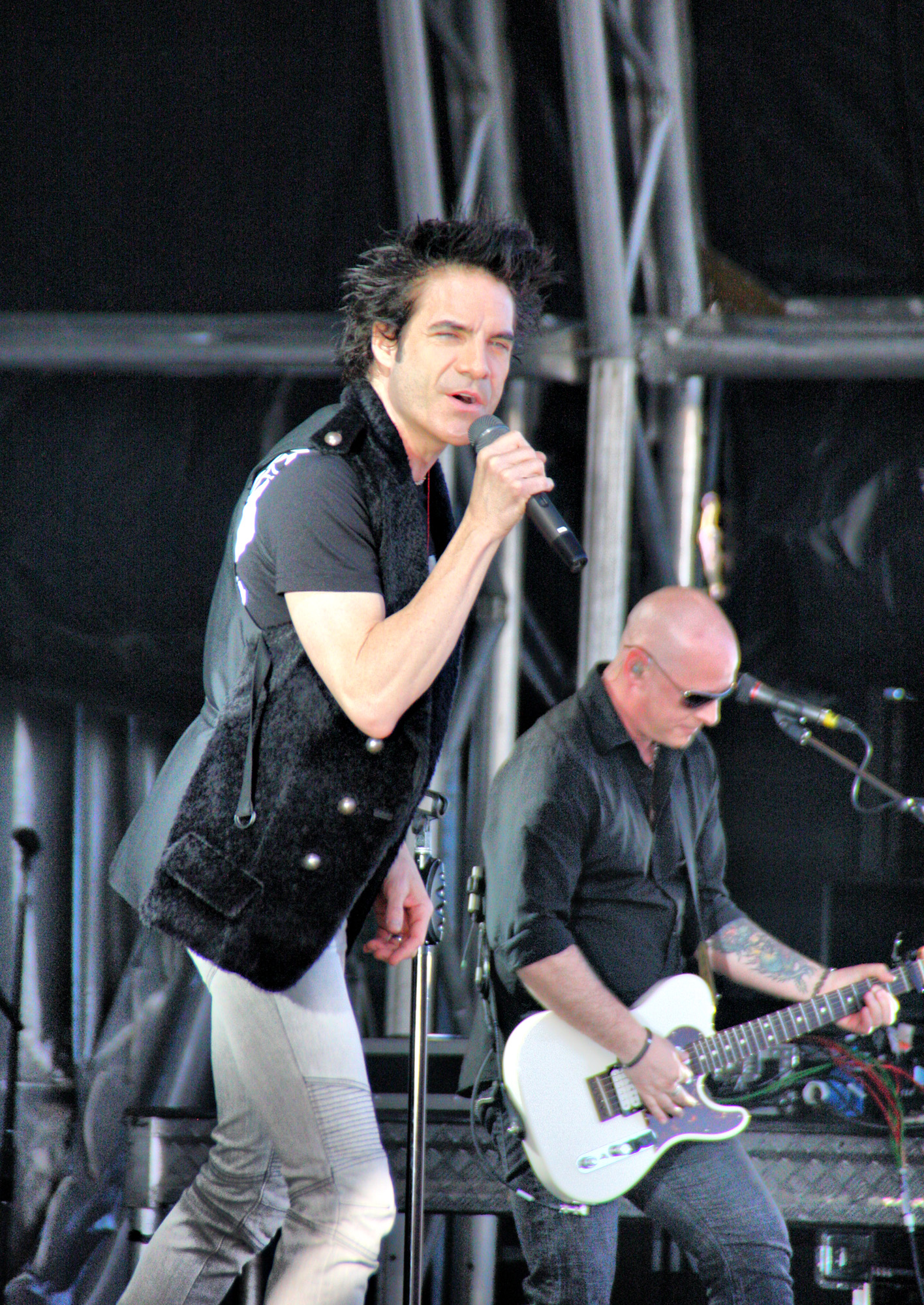
Monahan performing with Train in 2011

Despite the success of their new album, Monahan found time to collaborate with other artists in other projects. On April 4, 2010, he performed with the Hollies at the Rock and Roll Hall of Fame induction ceremony, as the Hollies were inducted. He sang lead vocals on the song "Long Cool Woman in a Black Dress". The following year, he contributed a cover of Buddy Holly's "Maybe Baby" for the tribute album, Listen to Me: Buddy Holly, which was released on September 6, 2011.

Monahan also recorded a duet with Martina McBride, singing Train's song "Marry Me". This version of the song is on McBride's eleventh studio album Eleven, released October 11, 2011. He also performed several times with INXS during 2011; first on The Tonight Show with Jay Leno and then at a concert at Chateau Ste Michelle. Monahan also appeared on the show The Voice, where he performed "Drops of Jupiter" with contestant Vicci Martinez.

In 2013, he started Patcast, a podcast in which he interviews people in the music industry and talks about his work with Train.

Monahan has sung the US national anthem at various events:

- August 5, 2007, at the Pro Football Hall of Fame Game in Canton, Ohio
- April 8, 2011, at a home opener of the San Francisco Giants at AT&T Park
- February 26, 2012, at the 2012 Daytona 500 in Florida
- April 24, 2014, at Oracle Arena for Game 3 of the playoffs between the Los Angeles Clippers and Golden State Warriors
- September 14, 2014, at Levi's Stadium in Santa Clara, California for the home opener between the San Francisco 49ers and the Chicago Bears
- January 18, 2015, at Gillette Stadium in Foxborough, Massachusetts for the AFC Championship Game between the Indianapolis Colts and New England Patriots
- June 12, 2016, at SAP Center in San Jose, California for Game 6 of the 2016 Stanley Cup Finals between the Pittsburgh Penguins and San Jose Sharks
- June 1, 2017, at Oracle Arena in Oakland, California for Game 1 of the 2017 NBA Finals between the Cleveland Cavaliers and Golden State Warriors
- June 13, 2019, at the last Golden State Warriors game at Oracle Arena, for Game 6 of the 2019 NBA Finals between the Toronto Raptors and the Golden State Warriors
- June 20, 2024, with his son Rock, at Game 4 of the American Hockey League’s Calder Cup Finals between the Coachella Valley Firebirds and the Hershey Bears at Acrisure Arena

Monahan inducted Journey into the Rock and Roll Hall of Fame on April 7, 2017.

== Other projects ==
In 2001, Monahan appeared on the Celebrity Top of the Charts Edition of ABC's hit TV game show Who Wants to Be a Millionaire, winning $US125,000 for Camp Ronald McDonald.

Monahan is the voice of Driver Dan in the children's show Driver Dan's Story Train, which debuted on Sprout on November 1, 2010. In early 2013, Monahan played the role of Neil Redding in a Season 3 episode of CBS's Hawaii Five-0, titled "Paʻani" ("The Game"), which aired on February 18, 2013. In 2009, Monahan appeared in episode eleven of the sixth season of CSI: NY, alongside Kim Kardashian. As of March 20, 2018, he is featured as a guest singer in the Broadway musical Rocktopia.

Monahan made an appearance singing his hit song from 2009, "Hey Soul Sister", as well as a new Train song "Mai Tais" Feat. Skylar Grey on Season 2, Episode 8 "He Came By Night" of CBS's Magnum PI, which aired on November 15, 2019. Monahan has also appeared on musical mystery game show I Can See Your Voice as a guest panelist.

In 2021, Monahan starred in Christmas In Tahoe, a Hallmark Channel film based on Train's album of the same name, and was also executive producer for the movie.

== Personal life ==
Monahan has been married twice. He met his first wife, teacher Ginean Rapp, at a bar called Sherlock's when he was playing in a cover band called Rogues Gallery. They married in August 1990 and have two children together: Patrick and Emelia. During their marriage, they lived in Fairview Township, Erie County, Pennsylvania; and Petaluma, California. Monahan and Rapp divorced in 2006.

Monahan met his second wife, Amber Peterson, on May 14, 2004. Monahan and Peterson married in 2007. They have two children together: Autumn and Rock Richard. They reside in Issaquah, Washington. During the 2026 Train tour, Monahan's son Rock joined him on stage performing.

== Discography ==
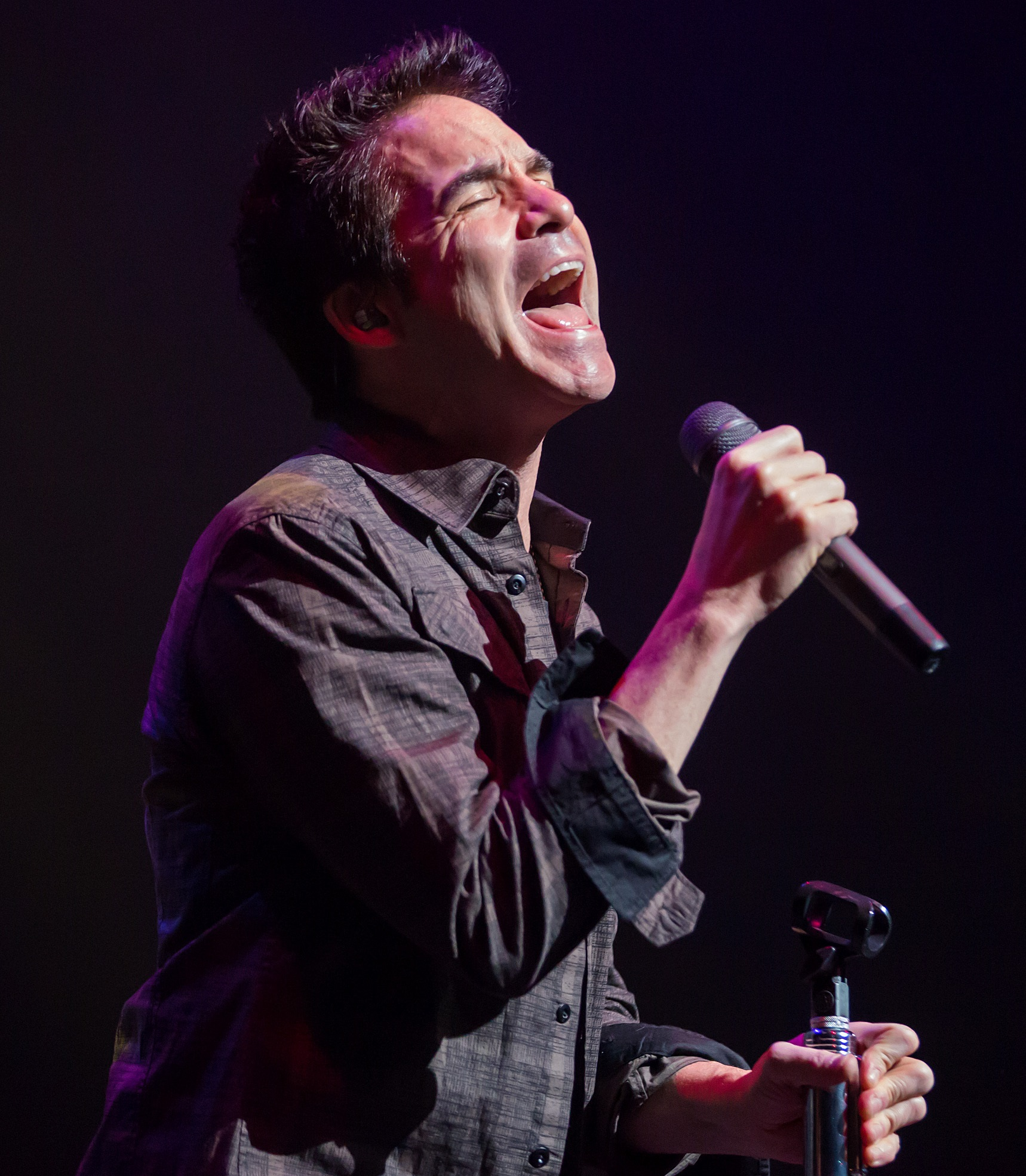
Monahan performing with Train in 2014

=== Studio albums ===
Year	Album details	Peak positions
Year	Album details	US
2007	Last of Seven: Release date: September 18, 2007; Label: Columbia Records	82

=== Singles ===
Year	Single	Peak chart positions			Album
Year	Single	US	US Adult	US Country	Album
As lead artist
2007	"Her Eyes"	110	9	—	Last of Seven
As featured artist
2010	"The Truth" (with Kris Allen)	—	17	—	Kris Allen
2012	"Marry Me" (with Martina McBride)	—	—	45	Eleven
"—" denotes releases that did not chart

=== Songwriting credits ===
List of songs written or co-written for other artists, showing year released and album name
Title	Year	Artist(s)	Album	Written with
"Babe"	2018	Sugarland featuring Taylor Swift	Bigger	Taylor Swift
"Babe (Taylor's Version)"	2021	Taylor Swift	Red (Taylor's Version)	Taylor Swift
