= Ice Hockey Stadium of Dunaújváros =

Ice hockey venue in Hungary

- Dunaújvárosi Jégcsarnok
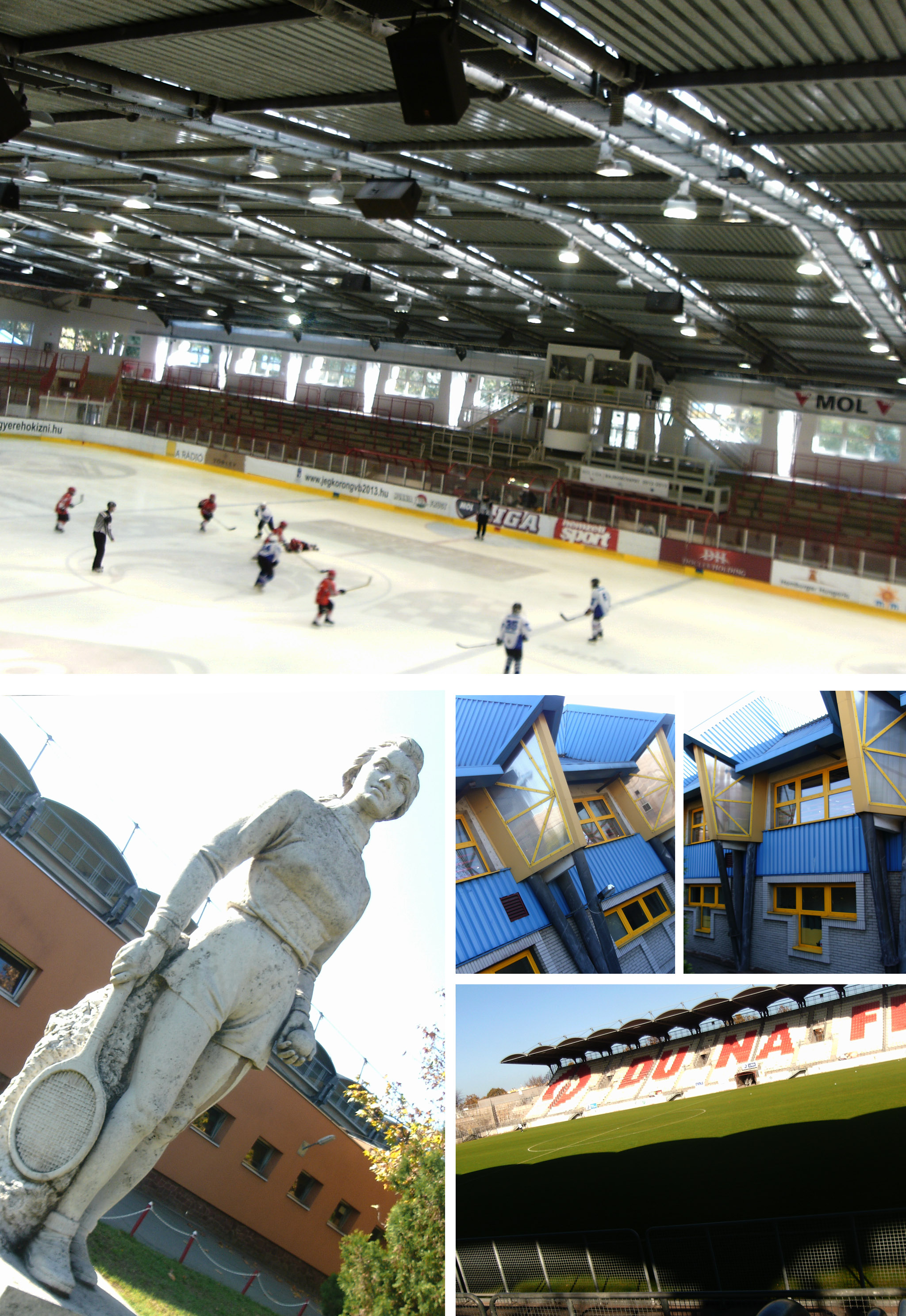
- Interactive map of Ice Hockey Stadium of Dunaújváros
- Location: Dunaújváros
- Coordinates: 46.9544°N 18.9482°E
- Capacity: 3,500- 4,000 hockey (500 with seating)

Construction
- Groundbreaking: 1973
- Opened: November 7, 1973

Tenant
- Steel Bulls of Dunaujaros men's team

Ice Hockey Stadium of Dunaújváros is located in Barátság District, Eszperanto Street, at the Sport Center Complex of Dunaújváros City, Hungary. Dunaújváros is 75 km (47 mi) from Budapest near the Danube river.

Stadium has built among the Football Stadium of Dunaújváros and the Handball Gymnasium of Dunaújváros. It is possible to approach the DAB-Docler's sport hall base through the 6 highway and the M6 highway or from the Danube–Tisza Interfluve through the Pentele Bridge.

Ice Hockey Stadium of Dunaújváros was built in 1973 as the first ice hockey stadium at the countryside, but before that there was a skating rink from 1956. The first version of the skating rink was 12 metres (39 ft) long and 11 metres (36 ft) wide. In 1967, it was planned to build a bigger one, which size was designed to 450 m^{2} (4,800 sq ft) to be able to receive four hundred kids for the same time. And there was a skates grinding and repair service. The enlargement was finished in 1968, that time the visitors could skate in 450 square meters. As the technology developed the ice had a better quality, the two compressors and the ammonia tanks provided sixteen Celsius degree temperature for the ice.

The team's name has changed three times, from Dunaferr to DAC-Invitel, and then DAB-Docler from 2006. There was another name which existed, Dunaferr SE U21, is a younger team compare to DAB-Docler, merged with that. As Dunaferr ice hockey team existed from 1977, when it was renamed to DAC-Invitel in 2003.

Beside of the Ice Hockey Stadium there is a car parking lot, which is under a usage also when the city has a football event. Total size of the buildings of the Ice Hockey Stadium is 6274 square meter and the main area of it is 1 hectare 0481 square meter.

In the International Sport Championships the domestic ice hockey team of Dunaujvaros played among national teams just like Ukrainian, German, Polish, Kazakh, Japanese for the trophy. Dunaujvaros has participated in the Hungarian MOL liga since 2008, in which it played ice hockey matches with Hungarian city teams for instance Debreceni HK, Újpesti TE, Ferencvárosi TC and Miskolci JJSE and with others from different countries in the international level HSC Csíkszereda, Corona Brasov, HC Nové Zámky.

Zsolt Azari is the chairman of the DAB-Docler ice hockey team. The 1995/1996 years was very fruitful for the team, they were awarded with a gold, they won the national championship, two years later they became the second. 1999 and 2002 were the years, when the Ice Hockey World Cup's first Division's Group B was managed in Dunaújváros and in Szekesfehervar. There are many ice hockey generations, which are practising for the future on one hand, include the U8 championship, U10 championship, U12 "preparing championship", U14 "kiddie championship", U16 "adolescent championship", U18 "youth championship", "junior championship" and in the other hand the older professional players creates the MOL liga, national championships. The U10 group, the U8 group, the U12 group usually plays in Croatia, Serbia (Belgrade). For the really young children the skating education is free. The Hungarian Ice Hockey Federation's vice-chairman, and the head couch of the Dunaferr SE supply got a Miklos Sera challenge-cup award because of his ice hockey coach accomplishment in 2009.

The ice curling rink opened again in the winter season as free entertainment and sport center in 2002. The Hungary men's national ice hockey team played matches with China, Great Britain, Norway, Romania, Denmark in 2002 at the Ice Hockey World Cup. Dunaujvaros's Sport Center Complex, which contains the Football Stadium, the Handball Gymnasium, the Ice Hockey Stadium are connected to each other with roads in a Green Area. Ice Hall's main building has blue roof, which is underpinned with metal columns, the entrance is yellow similar with the window frames, the walls got grey colour-washing. Just to step in the building, there is a foreground with the cash register, the doors bound it. After the doors the visitor can approach the first floor, stares are there, or the ice skating rink, that is enclosed by a transparent plastic Plexiglas wall around the ice and parallel with the Plexiglas wall there is a corridor with a long bench, close to it hallmark a dressing room. The nearby Football Stadium of Dunaujvaros approximately twenty-five meters away from the Ice Hockey Stadium, the latter is one meter below if we observe the terrain, between them there some stares and a fence plant.

There is a relative modern lighting technology system inside the hall's ceiling, the chairs made from plastic. Stadium was built with the southern eastern entrance door, there is another one from the northern west side of the building, and another one at the longitudinal of it which goes directly to the dressing room of the players.

The Ice Hockey Stadium of Dunaújváros has a buffet for refreshments and four big electronic displays in a square format for the match actual result. There are five chair lines at the grandstand. In the city center the government usually builds up a little uncovered skating rink in December every year. There are other ice hockey stadiums in Hungary, to go not so far the ice funs can skate in Székesfehérvár, Fejér County, Paks (Tolna County), Kaposvár and Budapest.

== Externial links ==
- Dobdocler Web
- Ice hockey news on the site of the dunaferrse
