= Adam Clark (engineer) =

Scottish engineer (1811–1866)

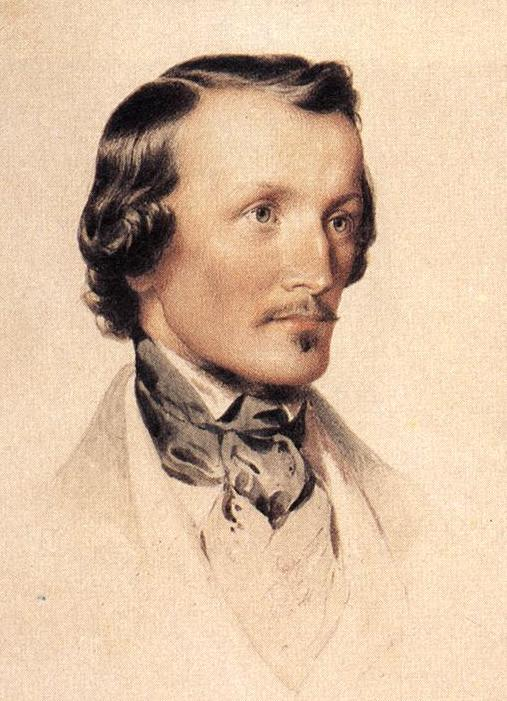
- Adam Clark, as depicted by Miklós Barabás
- Born: 14 August 1811; Edinburgh, Scotland
- Died: 23 June 1866 (aged 54); Buda, Hungary
- Occupation: Engineer
- Known for: Construction of Széchenyi Chain Bridge

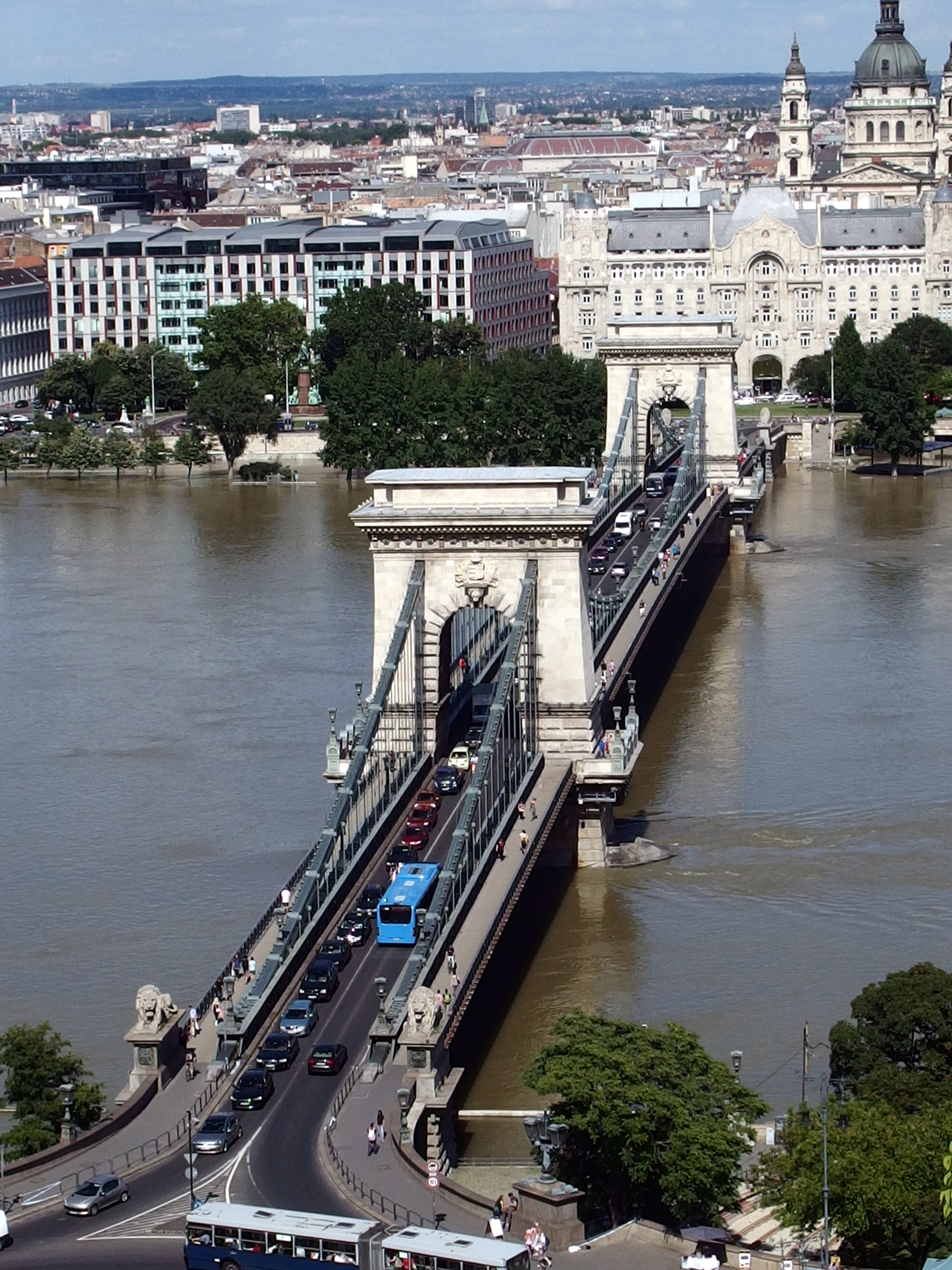
The Széchenyi Chain Bridge

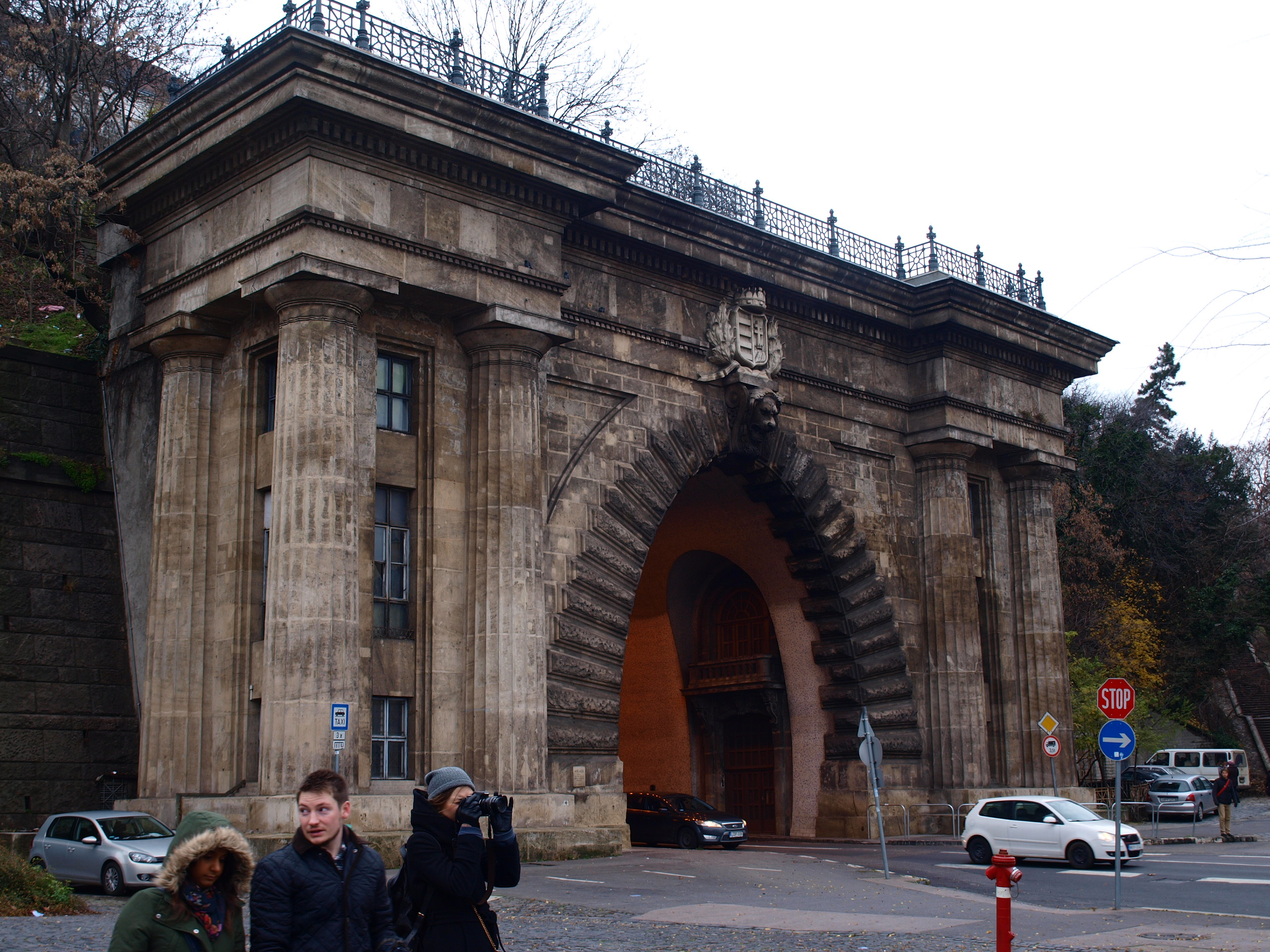
The Buda Castle Tunnel (eastern entrance)

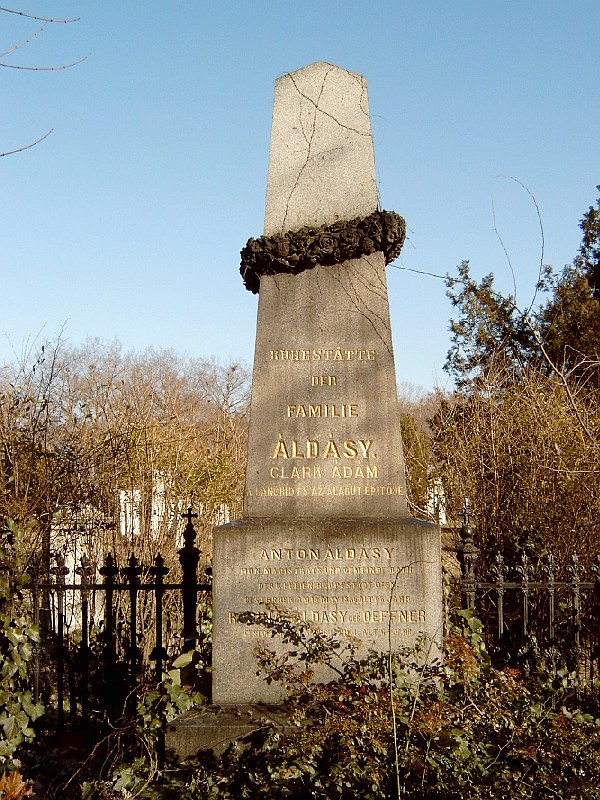
Clark's grave marker in Kerepesi Cemetery

Adam Clark (Hungarian: Clark Ádám; 14 August 1811 – 23 June 1866) was a Scottish civil engineer who is best known for his career in Hungary. His most famous work is the Széchenyi Chain Bridge over the Danube River in Budapest, which was one of the longest bridges in the world when it opened. Clark oversaw its construction from 1839 to 1849, and ensured its safety during the Hungarian Revolution of 1848. He remained in Hungary after the bridge's completion, and married a Hungarian.

== Early life ==
Clark was born in Edinburgh, Scotland, on 14 August 1811. He served his engineering apprenticeship with Darling & Hume and G. Manwaring & Co., and then found work with Hunter & English. In 1834, Clark was sent to Budapest to supervise the construction of a new dredger, which had been ordered by Count István Széchenyi for use on the Danube. He returned to Scotland after two years.

== Széchenyi Chain Bridge ==
In 1839, Clark moved back to Hungary to serve as resident engineer on the Chain Bridge, which was being built to link the twin towns of Buda and Pest across the Danube. With a central span of 666 feet (203 m) and a total length of 1,262 feet (385 m), it was one of the longest bridges in the world when it opened in 1849, just behind the 675 feet (206 m) central span of then third longest Hungerford Bridge (a footbridge opened earlier in 1849). The bridge's designer and chief engineer was an Englishman, William Tierney Clark (no relation), but he was unable or unwilling to remain in Hungary to supervise its construction. Clark spent ten years working on the bridge, with an annual salary of £400. He supervised the selection of the timber for its 5,000 piles, travelling to Slavonia and Tyrol to find appropriate wood.

The Chain Bridge was finally opened in November 1849, with the final stages of its construction having taken place during the Hungarian Revolution of 1848. In the early stages of the revolution, a crowd of demonstrators gathered at the bridge to demand the expulsion of foreign workers. Clark refused to meet their request, and the demonstrators were eventually dispersed by police. Clark in fact supported the revolutionaries, and in late 1848 assisted Lajos Kossuth's army in retreating across his bridge – still unfinished and untested. By one estimate, 70,000 men and 300 pieces of artillery crossed over in a single day.

On two other occasions, Clark saved his bridge from military destruction. In early 1849, he received information that the Austrian Imperial Army was planning to blow up the bridge, in order to prevent the rebels from crossing over from Pest to Buda. He immediately took action to minimize any damage, flooding the bridge's anchorage chambers to ensure its stability and then destroying pumps. The Austrians placed four canisters of gunpowder on the bridge, but only one detonated and the damage was insignificant.

In June 1849, Clark was informed that the Hungarian revolutionaries were going to demolish the bridge to prevent the Austrians from crossing the river. He met with General Henryk Dembiński, the Hungarian commander-in-chief, and convinced him that it was not necessary to destroy the entire structure to make it impassable for troops. Instead, Clark had the bridge platform dismantled and set some of the bridge components adrift on barges, allowing construction to easily resume at a more suitable time.

== Other works and later life ==
In 1850, Clark was commissioned by the Hungarian government to design and build a tunnel under Buda Castle, emerging directly opposite the Chain Bridge. This would significantly shorten the journey for those travelling to and from Buda's outskirts, who would otherwise have to go all the way around Castle Hill. Work on the Buda Castle Tunnel began in February 1853, with the tunnel opened to foot traffic in March 1856 and to horse traffic in April 1857. After the completion of the tunnel, Clark worked on several smaller commissions.

He died of lung disease on 23 June 1866, aged 54, and was buried in Kerepesi Cemetery. He is one of the very few foreigners who have been buried there.

== Personal life ==
In 1855, Clark married Mária Áldásy, a member of the local aristocracy, with whom he had three children. The couple and their children lived in a large villa in the Buda Hills that Clark had built for himself. One of their descendants was the famous mathematician György Hajós.

== Legacy ==
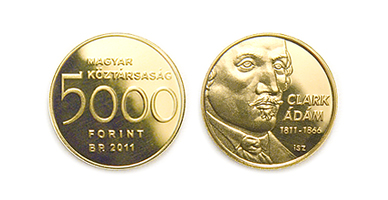
A commemorative coin was issued in honour of the 200th anniversary of Clark's birth.

Because of his contributions to the Budapest cityscape and his support for the Revolution of 1848, Clark became "something of a folk hero in Hungary". He is virtually unknown in his native Scotland, however. In 1912, the public square between the Széchenyi Chain Bridge and the Buda Tunnel was renamed Clark Ádám tér ("Adam Clark Square") in his honour. Adam Clark Square contains Hungary's Zero Kilometre Stone. Clark was deprecated somewhat by the Hungarian People's Republic during the 1950s, due to his association with the aristocracy, but his reputation was rehabilitated by later governments. In 2011, the Hungarian National Bank issued a 5000 forint coin to commemorate the 200th anniversary of Clark's birth. It was designed by László Szlávics. A floating crane of 200 t lifting capacity, used in the raising of the sunken passenger ship Hableány is named after him.
