= Memos Makris =

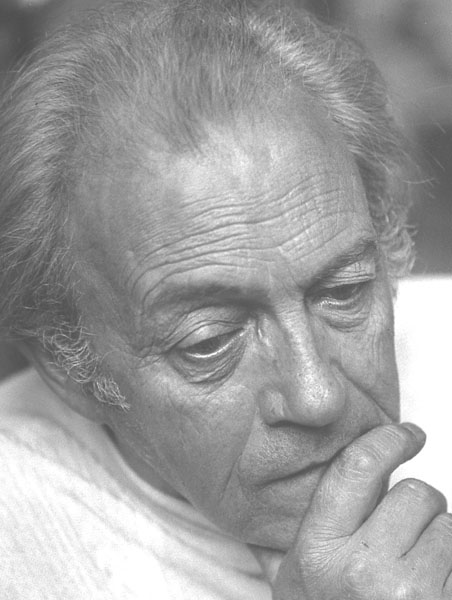
Memos Makris photo by László Szlávics, Jr.

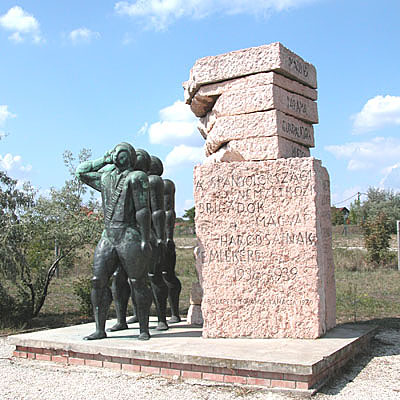
Makrisz Agamemnon: Memorial Sculpture from Hungary (photo by László Szlávics, Jr.)

Memos Makris (Greek: Μέμος Μακρής, Hungarian: Makrisz Agamemnon) (born April 1, 1913, in Patras – died May 26, 1993, in Athens) was a prominent Greek sculptor. He spent his early childhood in Patras but his family moved to Athens in 1919. He studied at the Athens School of Fine Arts and soon became involved in the artistic and cultural life of the 1930s. During the German Occupation Makris joined the National Resistance. After the liberation he continued his studies in Paris. He was deported from France in 1950 due to his political allegiance to the Left and sought political asylum in Hungary. In Hungary he became an important figure in the country's political and cultural life. In 1964 he was deprived of his Greek nationality, which he regained in 1975 after the restoration of democracy in Greece. In 1979 his first retrospective exhibition in Greece took place in the National Art Gallery.

== Important works ==
Some of his monumental sculptures include the one dedicated to the victims of the Mauthausen concentration camp in Austria, the monument to the Hungarian volunteers of the Spanish Civil War in Budapest, the monument of Liberation in Pécs. Many other of his works adorn squares and buildings all over Hungary. In Greece he is most known for his sculpture of the head of a youngster that is located at the entrance of the NTUA commemorating the 1973 Athens Polytechnic uprising, and in Cyprus for the emblematic statue of archbishop Makarios in the Presidential Palace.

== Sources ==
- Municipality of Patras - Municipal Gallery, Memos Makris, Catalogue of the sculpture retrospective, Ed. Dimitris Papanikolaou, Exhibition curators Zizi Makri and Clio Makri, Patras 1995.
