= Dunaújváros =

City with county rights in Fejér, Hungary

- City with county rights
- Dunaújváros Megyei Jogú Város
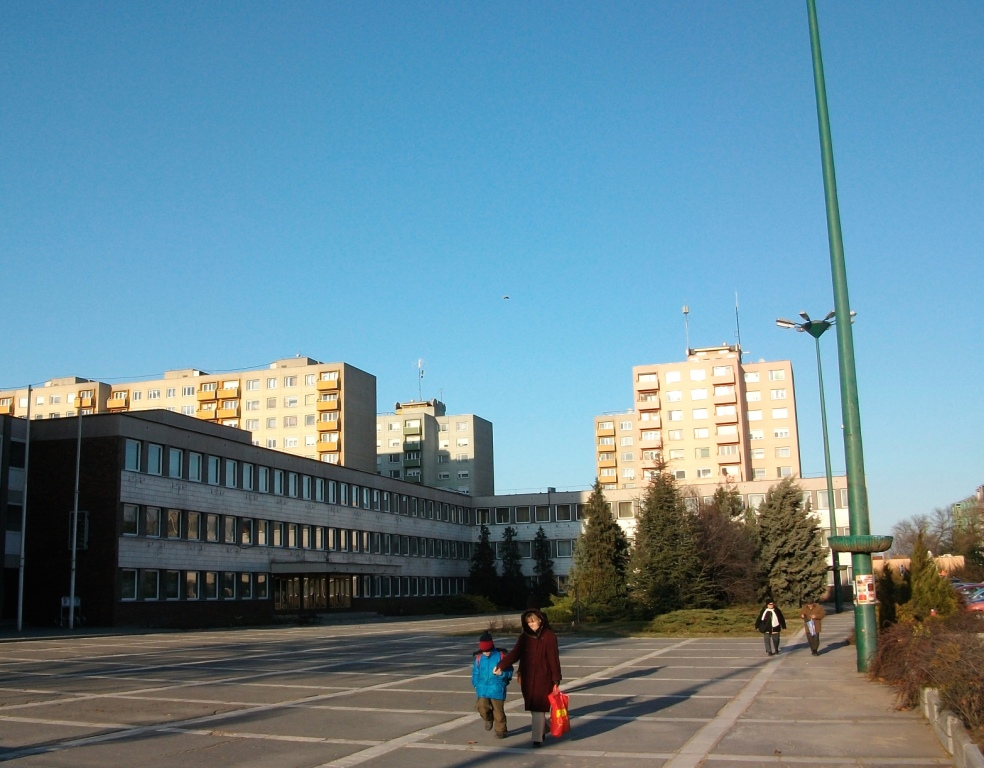
- Városháza Square with typical concrete block of flats called Panelház

- Flag Coat of arms

- Location of Dunaújváros Dunaújváros (Europe)
- Coordinates: 46.98065°N 18.91268°E
- Country: Hungary
- County: Fejér
- District: Dunaújváros

Government
  - Mayor: Tamás Pintér (Rajta Újváros Egyesület)

Area
  - Total: 52.66 km^{2} (20.33 sq mi)
- Elevation: 97 m (318 ft)

Population (2017)
  - Total: 44,640
  - Rank: 21st in Hungary
  - Density: 847.7/km^{2} (2,196/sq mi)
- Time zone: UTC+1 (CET)
  - Summer (DST): UTC+2 (CEST)
- Postal code: 2400–2407
- Area code: (+36) 25
- Website: dunaujvaros.com

Dunaújváros (pronounced [ˈdunɒuːjvaːroʃ]; also known by alternative names) is an industrial city with county rights in Fejér County, Central Hungary. Situated 70 kilometres (43 miles) south of Budapest along the Danube, the city is best known for its steelworks, the largest in the country. It was built in the 1950s on the site of the former village of Dunapentele and was originally named Sztálinváros, before acquiring its current name in 1961. In the 17th century, it was called Rácpentele, after the large number of Serbs (Rács) who inhabited the village while it was still under Ottoman rule.

== Geography ==
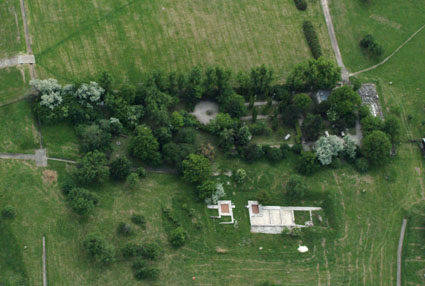
Dunaújváros – stonebay from above

Dunaújváros is located in the Transdanubian part of the Great Hungarian Plain (called Mezőföld), 70 kilometres (43 miles) south of Budapest on the Danube, Highway 6, Motorways M6, M8 and the electrified Budapest-Pusztaszabolcs-Dunaújváros-Paks railway.

== Etymology and names ==
The city replaced the village of Dunapentele ("Pantaleon up on the Danube"), named after Saint Pantaleon. The construction of this new industrial city started in 1949 and the original village was renamed Sztálinváros ("Stalin City") in 1951. After the Hungarian revolution of 1956, the new government renamed the city the neutral Dunaújváros in 1961, which means "Danube New City" (New City on the Danube).

In the 17th century, it was called Rácpentele.

The city is also known by alternative names in other languages: German: Neustadt an der Donau; Latin: Intercisa; and Serbian: Пантелија, romanized: Pantelija.

== History ==
Dunaújváros is one of the newest cities in the country. It was built in the 1950s during the industrialization of the country under Socialist rule, as a new city next to an already existing village, Dunapentele. At that time, a steel works was built and the city changed its name from Dunapentele to Sztálinváros ("Stalin City"). The oldest church is a Serbian Orthodox Church of Saint Nicholas, which is not surprising because Serbs have lived in the village of Rácpentele since ancient times, as in nearby Rácalmás which also bears the prefix Rács, meaning Serbian.

=== Dunapentele ===
Dunapentele was not built until the 1950s. The construction started on the Danube's right bank. The area has been inhabited since ancient times. When Western Hungary was a Roman Pannonia province, a military camp and a town called Intercisa stood in this place, at the border of the province. The Hungarians conquered the area in the early 10th century. The village of Pentele, named after the medieval Greek saint, Pantaleon, was founded shortly after.

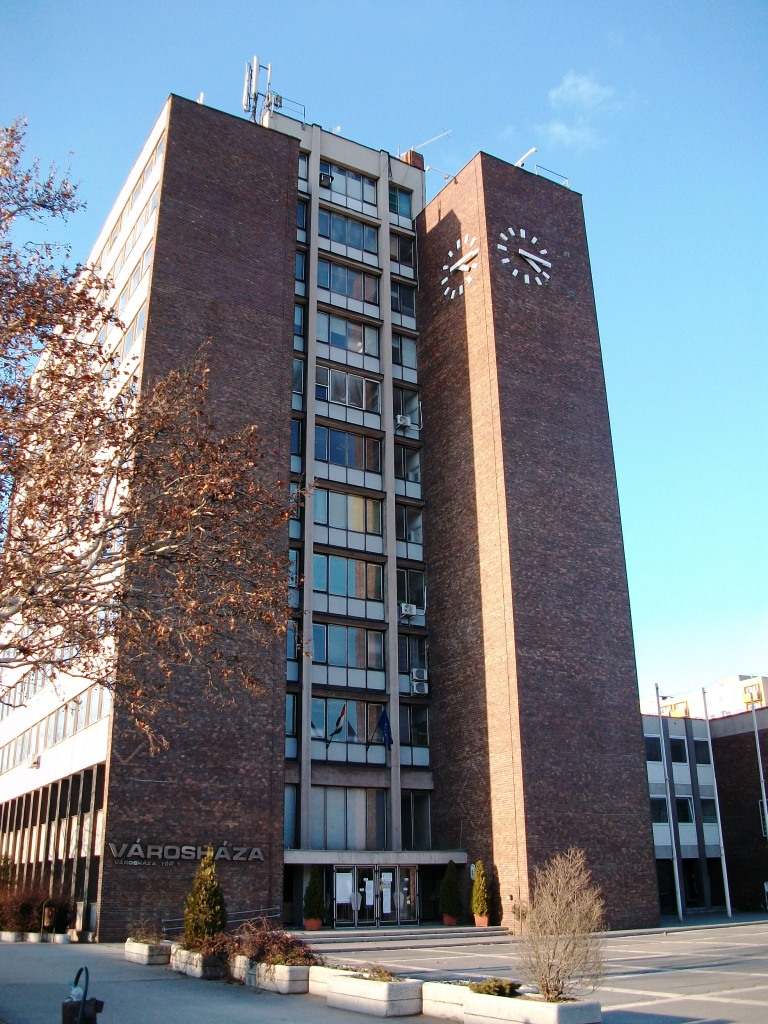
City hall

Between 1541 and 1688 the village was under Ottoman rule, and during the 150-year war, it was destroyed. During the freedom fight led by Prince Ferenc II Rákóczi of Transylvania, the town was deserted again. In the 18th, century the village began to prosper. In 1830 the village was given the right to hold market days twice a week. In 1831 there was a cholera epidemic which caused a small-scale peasants revolt. In 1833 Pentele was granted town status (oppidum) by Ferdinand V. The citizens took part in the freedom fight in 1848–49.

After the Second World War the new, Communist government started a major industrialisation programme, in support of its rearmament efforts. In 1949 Dunaújváros was chosen as the site of the largest iron and steel works in the country. The focus on steel production had the purpose of arming the socialist territories in fear of a third world war. With a strong steel industry, they could quickly stock up on weaponry and machinery. Originally they were to be built close to Mohács, but the Hungarian-Yugoslavian relations worsened, and this new site was chosen, farther away from the Yugoslav border. The city was designed to have 25,000 residents.

The construction of the city began on May 2, 1950, near Dunapentele. Within one year more than 1,000 housing units were built and construction on the factory complex began. The city officially took the name of Joseph Stalin on April 4, 1952; its name was Sztálinváros 'Stalin City' as a parallel to Stalingrad in the USSR.

The metal works (formerly 'Dunai Vasmű', now ISD DUNAFERR) were opened in 1954. At the time the city's population stood at 27,772; 85% of whom lived in modest apartments, whilst approximately 4,200 people lived in barracks which originally provided "homes" for the construction workers.

In the middle of the 1950s, public transport was organized, with buses carrying 24,000 passengers each day. During the 1950s many cultural and sports facilities were built, the Endre Ságvári Primary School being the largest school in Central Europe in the 1960s. The official and obligatory architectural style and art movement of the communist system was socialist realism. Per definition the style's meaning was communist, its form was national, and its preferred mode of representation was the allegory. There are several public statues and reliefs in the town, which represent the allegoric union of workers, peasants, and intellectuals, surrounded by traditional folk motifs. Thanks to the inspiration of Bauhaus the buildings and monuments of this era (1949–56), like the forge, the cinema, the theatre, the hospital, and the city's schools were characterized by structural functionalism, but the ideological function resulted in classicist decorations, like columns, tympanums, and arcades, because of which the informal name of the style became 'Stalin's Baroque' .

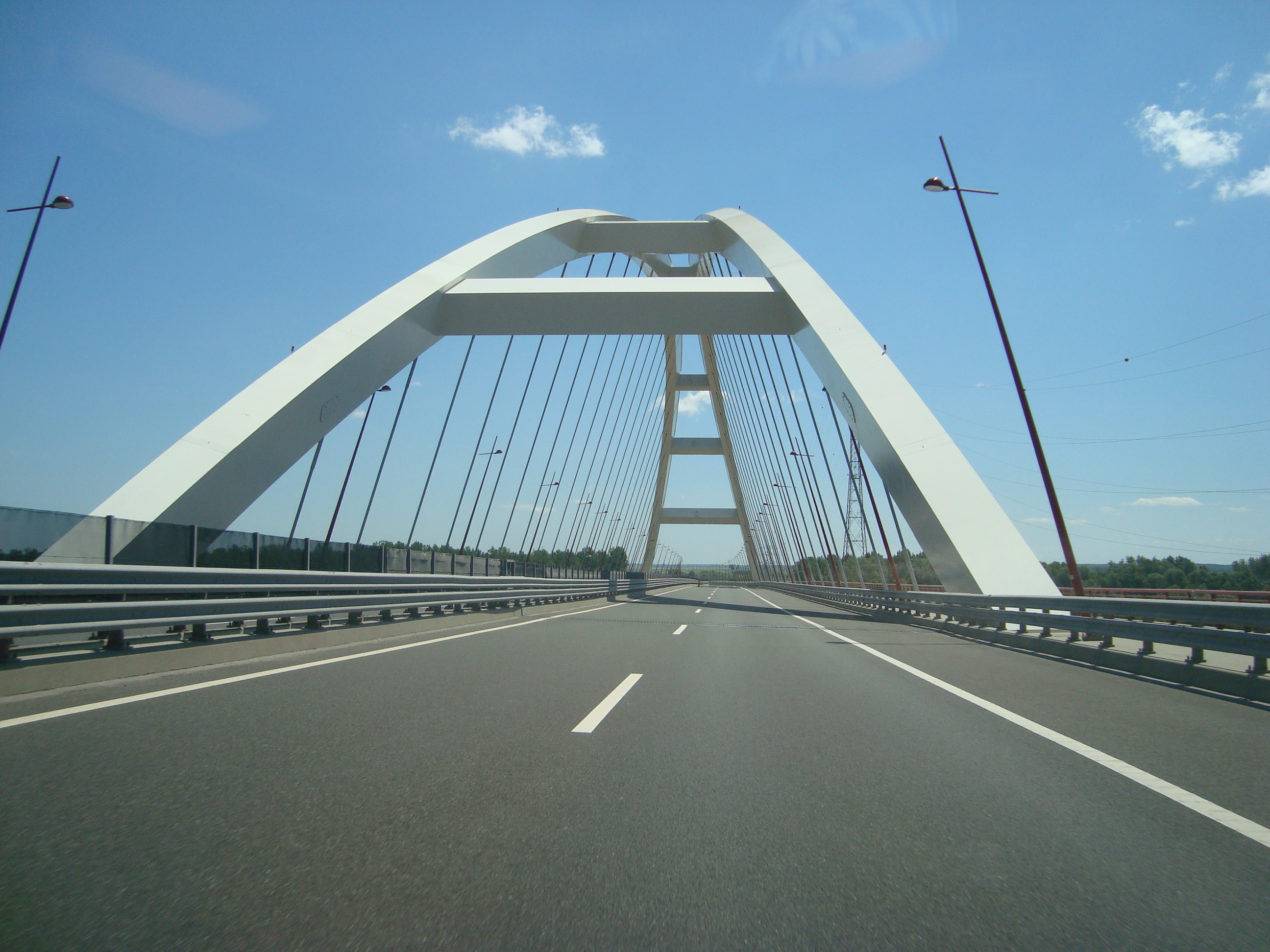
Pentele Bridge

In 1956, the construction was hindered by an earthquake and a flood, and in October by the start of the 1956 Hungarian Revolution. During the revolution, the city used its historical name Dunapentele again. The Rákóczi radio station, which was created by the revolutionaries, was broadcast from Dunapentele (in fact from a bus that was constantly moving around in the city so that it couldn't be located.) Even though the citizens of Dunapentele tried to defend their city, the Soviet army occupied the city on November 7, 1956. The city came under martial law and Soviet tanks were stationed throughout the city.

After the revolution, the city was still the "trademark city" of socialism in Hungary and was presented as such to foreign visitors. Among the visitors were Yuri Gagarin and the Indonesian president Sukarno. The city also provided a scenic backdrop to popular movies.

In 1960, the ten-year-old city already had 31,000 residents who celebrated its anniversary.

On November 26, 1961, the city's name was changed to Dunaújváros (Duna|új|város meaning Danube-new-city; "New City upon Danube". See also Tiszaújváros) as a consequence of Stalin's death (1953) and the Hungarian Revolution (1956).

In 1990 it became a city with county rights—as one of the then four, (now five) cities in the country that have this status but are not county capitals—in accordance with a new law that granted this status to all cities with a population over 50,000. Even though the population of Dunaújváros has been under 50,000 since 2008, it has kept its status as a city with county rights (along with Hódmezővásárhely, which is in a similar situation).

The ISD DUNAFERR (formerly: Dunai Vasmű) factory complex is still an important enterprise in the Hungarian steel industry, and a major employer (as of 2020, it has 4,500 employees) in the area.

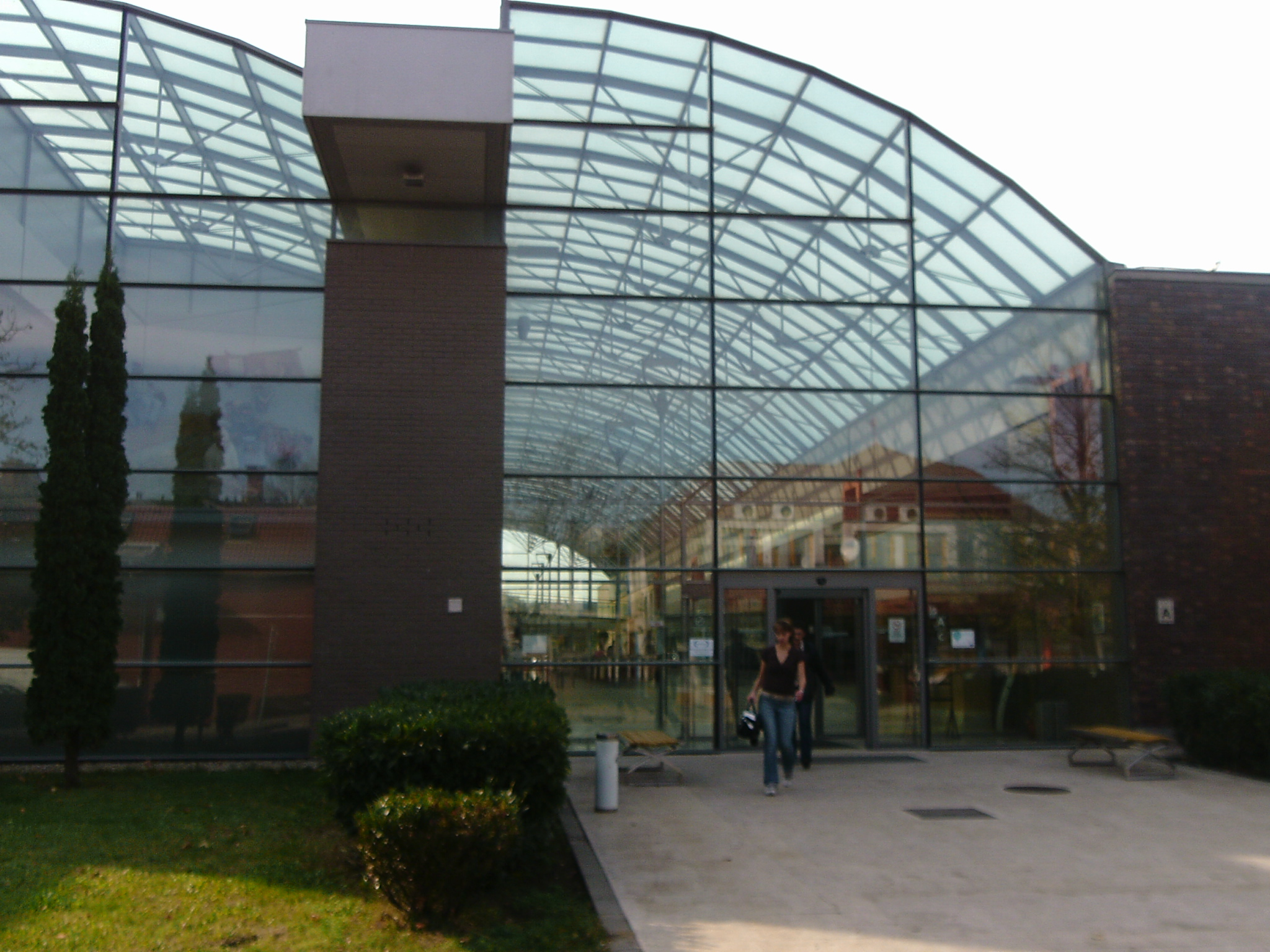
University of Dunaújváros

Today, Dunaújváros is home to new infrastructure (Pentele Bridge, direct M6-M8 highway link between Budapest and Dunaújváros), the new South Korean Hankook factory, Europe's biggest tire factory of Hankook, and Hamburger Hungaria, one of the largest containerboard manufacturers in Europe. This and other projects are turning Dunaújváros into a new Hungarian boomtown.

Due to its formal political and economic significance, along with the communist urban design and socialist realist architecture, the town is considered a memento of communism. Many of the half-century old buildings have received the protection of historic monuments, and the town is the focus of growing tourism interest.

== Demographics ==
Historical population
Year	Pop.	±%
1949	3,949	—
1960	30,976	+684.4%
1970	45,129	+45.7%
1980	60,736	+34.6%
1990	59,028	−2.8%
2001	55,309	−6.3%
2011	48,484	−12.3%

In 2001 Dunaújváros had 55,309 residents (92.5% Hungarian, 0.6% Romani, 0.6% German, 6.3% other). Religions: 38.9% Roman Catholic, 8.3% Calvinist, 2% Lutheran, 37.8% Atheist, 0.2% other, 12.8% no answer.

== Politics ==
The current mayor of Dunaújváros is Tamás Pintér (Jobbik).

The local Municipal Assembly, elected at the 2019 local government elections, is made up of 15 members (1 Mayor, 10 Individual constituencies MEPs, and 4 Compensation List MEPs) divided into political parties and alliances:

Party	Seats	Current Municipal Assembly
Come on Újváros! (Note: Supported by Opposition coalition.)	11	M
Fidesz-KDNP	4	

== Sport ==
The most popular sport is ice hockey, and the city is home to the Steel Bulls (which plays at the Ice Hockey Stadium of Dunaújváros). The second most popular sport in the town is football. The town has one team playing in the top-level league, the Nemzeti Bajnokság I, the Dunaújváros PASE. However, the most well-known team is the defunct Dunaújváros FC which also won the 1999–2000 Nemzeti Bajnokság I season. The women's water polo team of Dunaújvárosi FVE won the 2018 edition of the LEN Trophy.

== Notable people ==
- Károly Bezdek (born 1955), professor of mathematics
- Fruzsina Brávik (born 1986), 2008 Olympian in water polo
- Anita Bulath (born 1983), handball player
- Csanád Erdély (born 1996), ice hockey player
- Nikandrosz Galanisz (born 1988), ice hockey player
- Viktor Horváth (born 1978), Modern Pentathlete
- Miklós Kiss (born 1981), designer and visual artist
- Zsófia Kovács (born 2000), gymnast
- Balázs Ladányi (born 1976), ice hockey player
- Bálint Magosi (born 1989), ice hockey player
- Gergő Nagy (born 1989), ice hockey player
- Imre Peterdi (born 1980), ice hockey player
- Miklós Rajna (born 1991), ice hockey player
- Viktor Szélig (born 1975), ice hockey player
- Viktor Tokaji (born 1977), ice hockey player
- Georgina Toth (born 1982), Hungarian–Cameroonian hammer thrower
- János Vas (born 1983), ice hockey player
- Márton Vas (born 1980), ice hockey player
- Máté Balogh (born 1990), composer

== Twin towns – sister cities ==
Dunaújváros is twinned with:

- Alchevsk, Ukraine
- Elbasan, Albania
- Giurgiu, Romania
- İnegöl, Turkey
- Silistra, Bulgaria
- Sremska Mitrovica, Serbia
- Terni, Italy
- Villejuif, France

== See also ==
- Dunaújváros Power Plant
- Tiszaújváros
- Church of the Transfer of the Relics of the Holy Father Nicholas, Dunaújváros
- Ráckeve
- Rácalmás
- Rascians
