= Clark Ádám (crane vessel) =

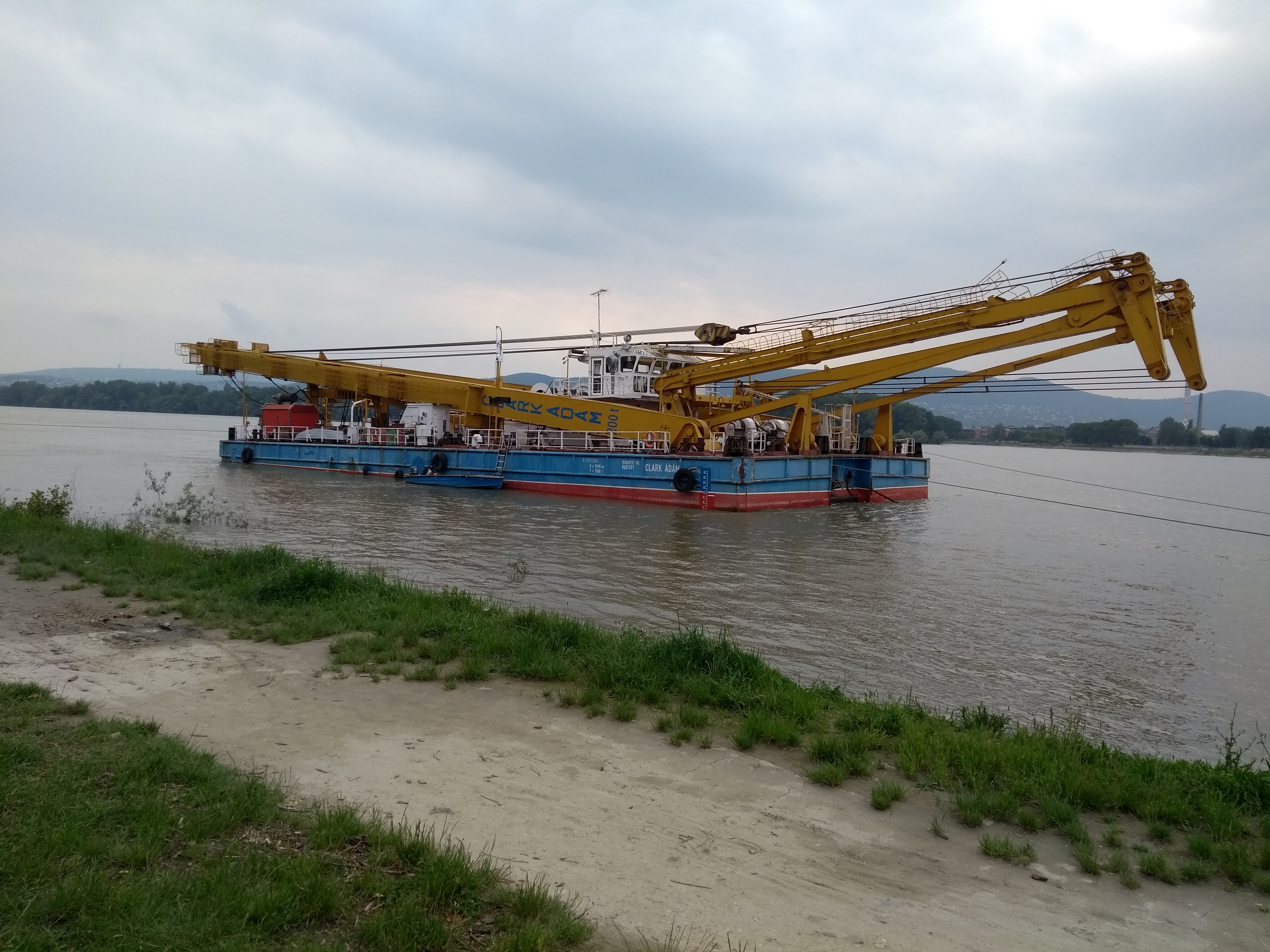
- Clark Ádám moored at Újpest, en route to the sunken Hableány, in 2019

History

Hungary
- Name: Clark Ádám
- Namesake: Adam Clark
- Owner: Hídépítő Speciál (HSP)
- Port of registry: Budapest, Hungary
- Builder: Hungarian Shipyards and Crane Factory (MHD) Angyalföld Division, Budapest
- Cost: 100 million HUF (1980)
- Yard number: 2353
- Launched: October 21, 1980
- In service: 1981–present
- Refit: 1997, 2006
- Identification: MMSI number: 243071116; ENI number: 08601591; call sign: HGKP
- Status: in service

General characteristics
- Type: crane vessel (floating sheerleg)
- Displacement: 1323 metric ton
- Length: 50,95 m
- Beam: 19,9 m
- Depth: 1,86 m
- Installed power: 2×Scania DS 14 diesel engine; (2×390 kW)
- Propulsion: 2×Veth VZ-400 Z-drive
- Speed: max. 16–17 km/h
- Capacity: 200 metric ton (lifting)
- Crew: 11

Clark Ádám is a crane vessel, specifically a floating sheerleg, built in 1980 in Budapest, Hungary, by the Hungarian Shipyards and Crane Factory (Hungarian: Magyar Hajó- és Darugyár; MHD) Angyalföld Division. It originally had a lifting capacity of 120 metric tons, gradually raised to 200 tons by 2006, making it one of the largest in lifting capacity on Central European rivers. It is mainly used for building bridges, but is also commissioned to assist salvage operations, as well as to launch hydrofoils. It has rescued several ships; in 2019 it raised the sunken Hableány from the Danube at Budapest. The vessel is named after Scottish engineer Adam Clark (1811–1866).

== Characteristics ==
The floating crane is powered by two Scania DS 14 diesel engines, each of 520 hp (390 kW). Its fuel tank has a capacity of 60,000 litres (13,000 imp gal; 16,000 US gal), which allows for 200 hours of operation. The two engines are mounted on rubber stands to minimize vibration and noise. They each have their own helms, but the second helm is only used to stop the vessel, or when the vessel gets caught on a shoal. Its maximum speed is around 16–17 kilometres per hour (9.9–10.6 mph). Every ten years the vessel undergoes maintenance and repair in a dry dock in Austria.

== History ==
The vessel was commissioned by the Capital City Council (Fővárosi Tanács) of Budapest to assist the expansion of Árpád Bridge, as the two other floating cranes available at the time (named after Attila József and Endre Ady) were deemed unsuitable. The cost was covered by the council and the vessel was donated to Bridge-building Company (Hídépítő Vállalat, later becoming Hídépítő Speciál), as the company itself did not have sufficient funding. The final cost of Clark Ádám was 100 million Hungarian forints. It was launched on October 21, 1980. It was also used to build other bridges, like the Pentele Bridge, or the Megyeri Bridge. It is also commissioned to launch hydrofoils.

Clark Ádám is actually the second vessel intended for the Árpád Bridge construction. The first one (TOEC, yard number 2370) was only partially built when it was sold to a Syrian company in February 1980.

The floating crane was originally designed with two lifting capacity of 100 (boom with 20 m lifting platform) and 120 ton metric (boom with 10 m lifting platform) in 1980. In 1997, Ganz Danubius Vitla improved it to a 150-ton capacity with a new propulsion and later, in 2006, to a 200-ton capacity.

== Notable involvements ==
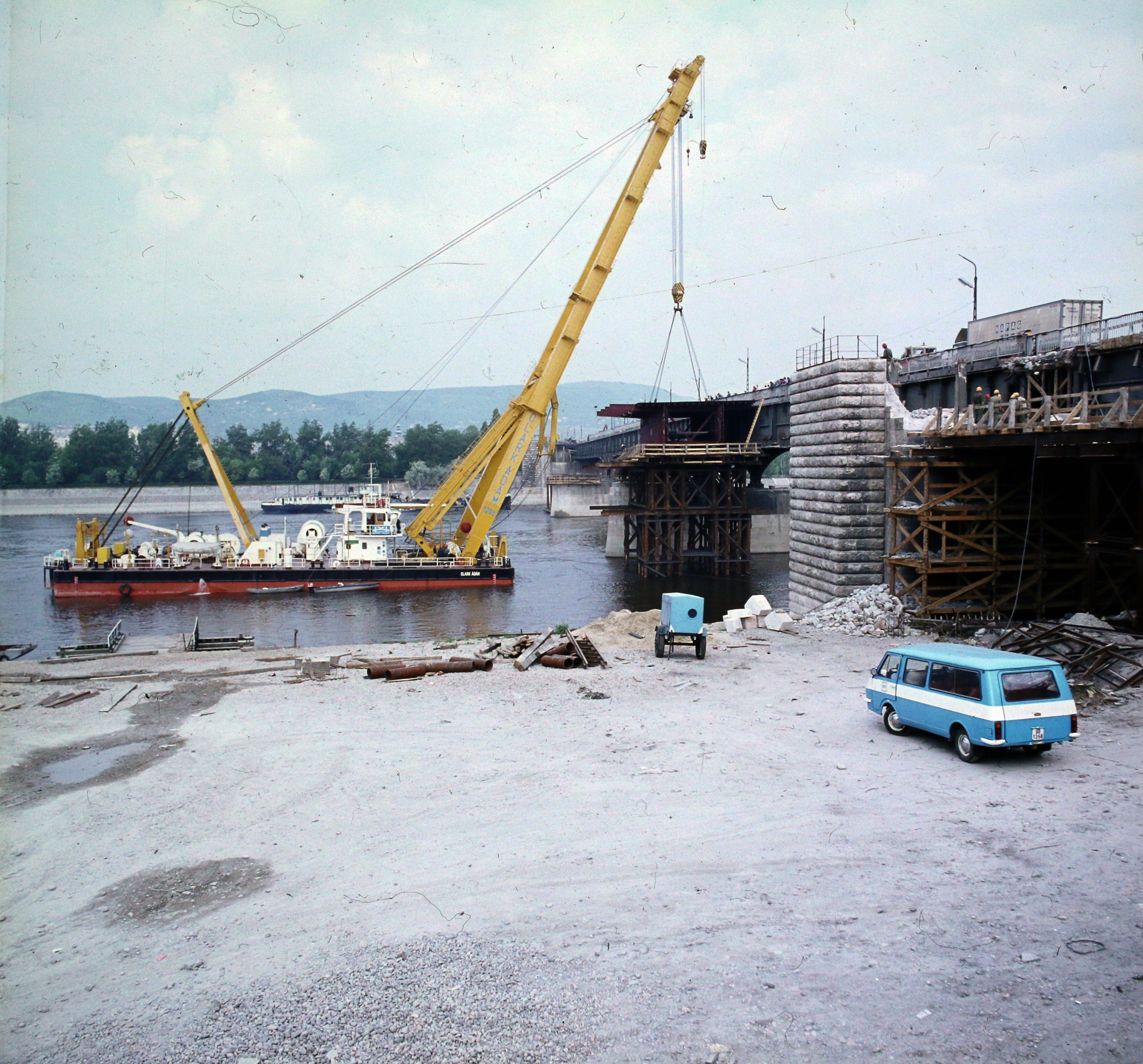
Clark Ádám at work on Árpád Bridge, 1981

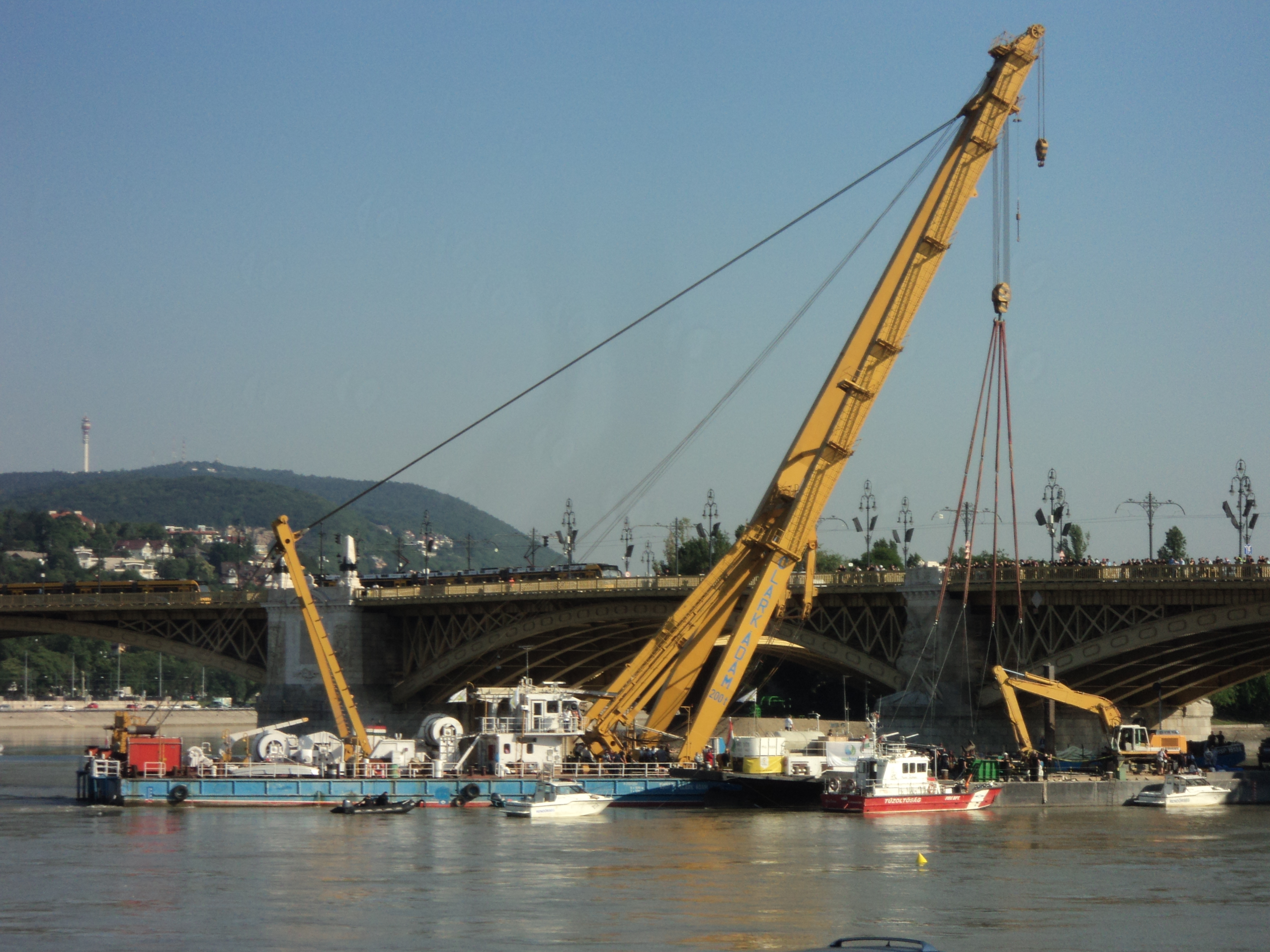
Clark Ádám raising the Hableány on 11 June 2019

- the expansion of Árpád Bridge (1981–1983)
- lifting a truck that had plunged into the Danube from the Árpád Bridge (4 February 1982)
- laying down a 82 metres (269 ft) long, 1 metre (3 ft 3 in) diameter pipe into the Moson-Danube (9 July 1987)
- lifting the sunken survey ship of the Environmental and Water Management Research Institute out of the Danube at Ásványráró (15 July 1987)
- building Deák Ferenc Bridge at the M0 motorway (1987–1989)
- building Rákóczi Bridge (1993–1995)
- lifting the sunken Ukrainian barge Vakulenchuk Matróz from the Danube at Újpest (1998)
- renovation of Türr István Bridge at Baja (1998–1999)
- building Mária Valéria Bridge (2001)
- building Szent László Bridge (2002)
- building Pentele Bridge (2005–2006)
- building Megyeri Bridge
- renovation of the Újpest railway bridge (2008)
- lifting the punctured pleasure boat Csillag from the Danube at Vigadó Square (2010)
- raising remnants of barges and bridge members from the Danube during the renovation of Margit Bridge (2011)
- building the New Danube Bridge at Komárno/Komárom (2017–2019)
- raising the sunken Hableány (2019)
