= Miklós Kiss =

Hungarian designer and visual artist (born 1981)

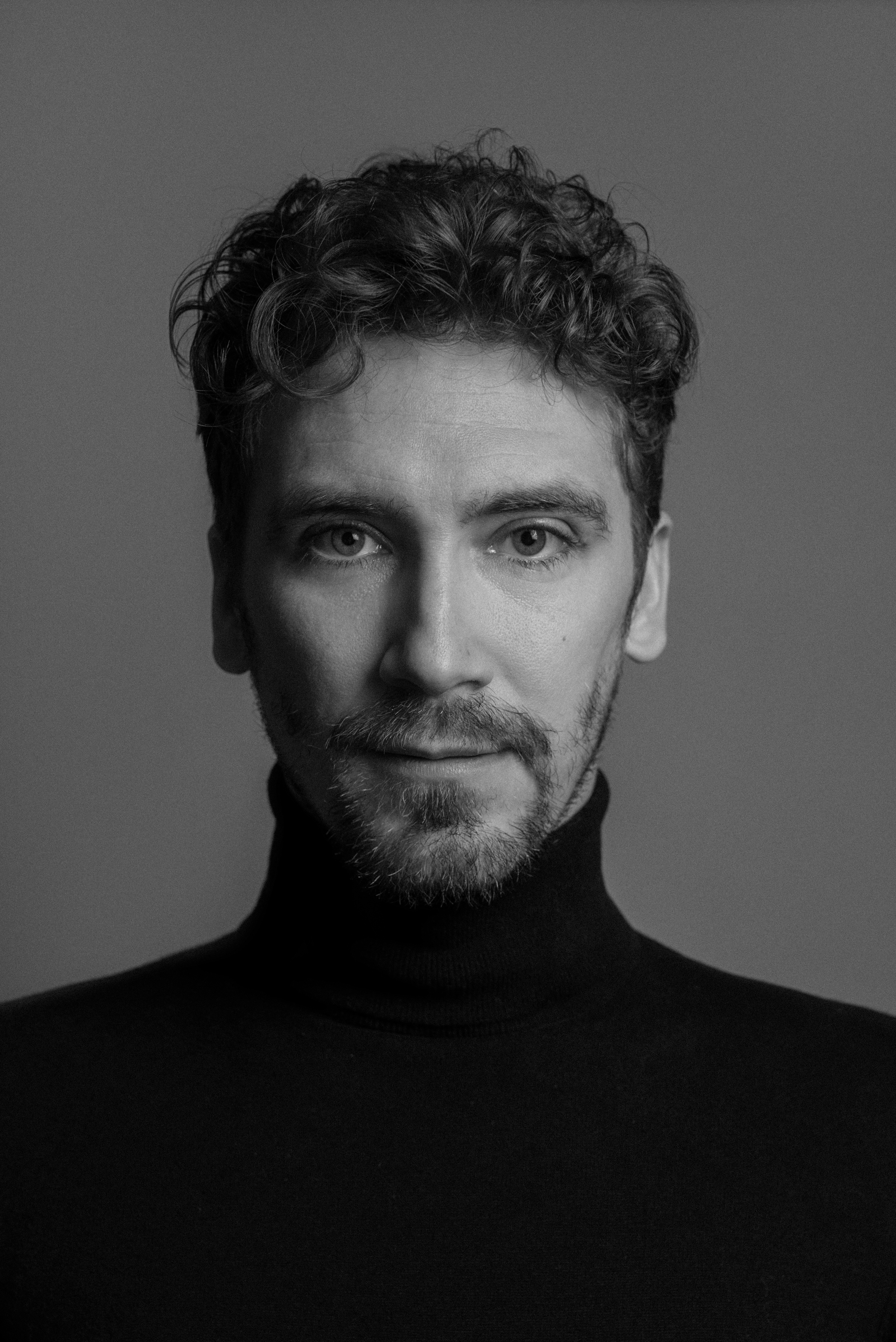
- Born: September 19, 1981 (age 44); Dunaújváros, Hungary
- Occupations: designer, visual artist
- Writing career
- Pen name: kissmiklos
- Genres: Typography, graphic design, interior design, installations, guerilla art
- Website: kissmiklos.com

kissmiklos (Miklós Kiss /miklɔːʃ kiʃ/, born 19 September 1981) is a Hungarian designer and visual artist, known for incorporating elements of graphic design, design, fine art and architecture into his work. His art is characterized by a strong conceptual approach and an outstandingly aesthetic quality. In his branding and graphic designs, he has developed his unmistakably minimal and distinctive style.

== Life and education ==
Kiss was born in Dunaújváros, Hungary on September 19, 1981. He received his degree from the Hungarian Academy of Fine Arts, where he studied graphics, painting and teaching art from 2000 to 2006. During his studies he exhibited in the Műcsarnok / Kunsthalle, in Ludwig Museum, Budapest, and in the Institute of Contemporary Art, Dunaújváros. After university, Kiss was invited to the Essl Award Exhibition, Essl Museum of Contemporary Art, Vienna, where he received a special award.

== Commercial work ==
Since 2008 Kiss has established himself as a visual artist and graphic designer integrating graphics, design and interior design in his projects. In 2009 he completed the overall graphic design of the signage for the Budapest Liszt Ferenc International Airport. In 2011 the Museum of Applied Arts purchased his furniture collection made of recycled tires. Collaborating with Heineken from 2012 to 2014, Kiss created limited edition bottle designs and two large installations.

Over time Miklós Kiss has developed a comprehensive design practice. These design projects encompass all facets of design from graphic and web design to packaging and interior design. His typographical style and logo design focus on ligatures and playing with letters.

From 2013 to 2018, he designed the identity and packaging for the first Hungarian perfume line, Viktoria Minya. In 2018, Kiss was commissioned by Budapest Central European Fashion Week to create a new identity and rebranding the Retail Design Blog.

From 2016 to 2019, Kiss was invited to work on an overall branding project for the City of Kaposvár. In 2019, Kiss was commissioned with design projects for Lincoln Center (New York), Four Seasons (Budapest) and had rebranding concepts for the Guggenheim Museums and Foundation, the Daily Mail and the New York Magazine.

In collaboration with the architect studio, Archikon, Kiss designed a very imposing interior for the Restaurant in House of Millennium in 2019. He created exaggerated large-scale knick-knacks, plates and vases based on the eosin technique of Zsolnay porcelain manufactory.

Kiss’ designs, typographic works and interior designs are featured on countless international design blogs, in design books and publications.

== Artistic work ==
Most of the artworks of Miklós Kiss explore the borders and transitions between art and design and feature immersive viewer interaction.

Since 2011, Miklós Kiss has been performing his guerrilla art Goldenroach smuggling 14-carat gold-plated bronze cockroaches into museums and galleries, making them part of the display: Tate Modern, Tate Britain, British Museum, Saatschi Gallery, MUMOK, Hamburger Bahnhof, Centre Pompidou, Louvre, MAXXI, Vatican Museums, MOMA and the Venice Biennale. In the first legal exhibition Goldenroach Unlimited in Műcsarnok / Kunsthalle, Budapest, 2014 Kiss installed 12,000 golden roaches along with one 14-carat gold roach hidden among the plastic insects. The Goldenroach guerilla art and installation investigated the definition of art from the aspect of location and way of display.

Kiss has engaged in several public art installations, including Ball.Room, Design Terminal, Elisabeth Park, 2016 and Just Decoration Tag Cloud in Mom Park, 2017, Budapest. In 2019 Kiss exhibited his rethought Ball.Room. installation with his emograms in Gwangju Design Biennale Main Pavilion. In 2020, his first international solo exhibition opened in the Lottery Gallery Incheon, South Korea.

== Personal life ==
Since 2018, Miklós Kiss has been married to photographer Eszter Sara Cseh.

The extraordinary proposal, that was a disguised a guerilla art action in 2018 in MOMA, was followed by an exceptional wedding ceremony. The wedding identity design was based on manipulating some famous classical oil paintings. The faces on these iconic paintings were exchanged with the portraits of the bride and the bridegroom. The paintings were printed on canvas in the original size and the wedding started with a real exhibition opening. The wedding identity included invitation cards similar to exhibition invites, museum shop-like postcards, a photobook and a special wine label edition.

== Selected exhibitions ==
- (2020) Emograms with Love, solo exhibition, Incheon, South Korea
- (2019) Ball.Room. installation, Gwangju Design Biennale Main Pavilion, South Korea
- (2017) Just Decoration Tag Cloud, installation, Mom Park Shopping Centre, Budapest
- (2016) Myself, interactive exhibition, Budapest
- (2016) Ball.Room, installation, Design Terminal, Budapest
- (2014) Goldenroach Unlimited, exhibition, Mücsarnok / Kunthalle Budapest

== Books/Magazines ==
- BranD Magazine, Issue 47 – Look Forward
- Novum, World of Graphic Design (04/19), Stiebner Verlag GmbH, D-80636 München
- Flora&Fauna, Viction:workshop Ltd., Hong Kong
- Los Logos 8, Gestalten, Berlin
- Branding & Spaces Design, Instituto Monsa de Ediciones, Barcelona
- Bon Appétit / Complete Branding for Restaurants, Cafés and Bakeries / Sendpoints Publishing Co., Ltd. Guangzhou, China
- Eat and Stay, Sandu Publishing Co., Ltd., Guangzhou, China
- BOB / International Magazine of Space Design / 132 / A&C Publishing Co., Ltd., Seoul
- BOB / International Magazine of Space Design / 127 / A&C Publishing Co., Ltd., Seoul
- AIT / Architektur, Innenarchitektur, Technisher Ausbau / 3.2015 / Verlagsanstalt Alexander Koch GmbH, Leinfelden-Echterdingen
- Los Logos 7, Gestalten, Berlin
- Computer Arts, Issue #221 (December 2013), Future Publishing Ltd., Bath
- How to use type, Laurence King Publishing Ltd., London
- Novum – World of Graphic Design (01/13), Stiebner Verlag GmbH, D-80636 München
- Computer Arts Collection Volume 1 Part 4: Branding by Franklin Till, Future Publishing Ltd., Bath, UK
- Los Logos 6, Gestalten, Berlin
- Communication Arts, Volume 54, Number 3, Coyne & Blanchard, Inc., California
- Introducing: Visual Identities for Small Business, Gestalten, Berlin
