= Dunaújváros Power Plant =

Power station in Dunaújváros, Fejér, Hungary

- Country: Hungary
- Location: Dunaújváros, Fejér County
- Coordinates: 46°55′17″N 18°56′23″E
- Status: Operational
- Construction began: 2014
- Commission date: 2016
- Owner: SWECO

Thermal power station
- Primary fuel: Biomass

Power generation
- Nameplate capacity: 50 MW

The Dunaújváros Power Plant, located close to Dunaújváros city, is one of Hungary's largest biomass power plants, with an installed heat capacity of 160 MW and electric capacity of 50 MW. The plant construction had commenced in 2014 and it was commissioned in 2016.
