= László Szlávics Jr. =

Hungarian artist and sculptor (born 1959)

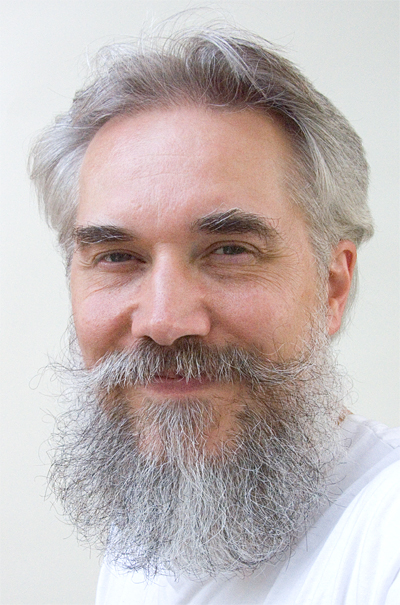
- Szlávics Jr. in 2010
- Born: Hungarian: Szlávics László; August 11, 1959 (age 67); Budapest, Hungary
- Known for: Sculpture, Medallic art, Coin, Kinetic art, Interactive art, Mobile

László Szlávics (born August 11, 1959) is a Hungarian sculptor and medallic artist. He publishes his works under the names (Hungarian: ifj. Szlávics László, or Szlávics László, ifj.) László, ifj. Szlávics or Laszlo Szlavics Jr.

László Szlávics jr. has set several new norms in Hungarian medallic art. It was presumably not his express aim, but he was merely following the dictates of his innovative mind to do something new not yet found in the trade. He is heading in this direction, with the sure – and literally tangible – conviction that at the extremes, on the limits of the art form there is still a lot to be searched – and found out.

— Antal Tóth

== Biography ==
Between 1973 and 1977 he attended the Arts & Crafts Secondary School in Budapest. After obtaining his Secondary School Leaving Certificate his training was supervised by his father also László Szlávics a goldsmith and sculptor and the sculptor Agamemnon Makris. Since 1973 he has lived and worked in the Százados artist’ colony in Budapest. Since 1995 he has often designed memorial coins for the National Bank of Hungary.

== Works ==
Szlávics is primarily a medalist. His works include every kind of medal, from those displaying the craftsmanship of the traditional minter to such as tend towards small sculptures. The dual commitment tend towards can be appreciated in all his works.

From the middle of the 1970s his sculptures, reliefs and medals have been characterized by realism and the precision of their craftsmanship. In the 1980s he was noted for handmade medals engraved in a steel negative, a technique reminiscent of ancient coinage. (Birds, Africa, Count István Széchenyi, Hungarian generals executed at Arad in 1849 stb.). Cast bronze works show the influence of Cubism. Among them, the most notable of the first half of the 1990s are a series of 20 medals inspired by Vincent van Gogh works.

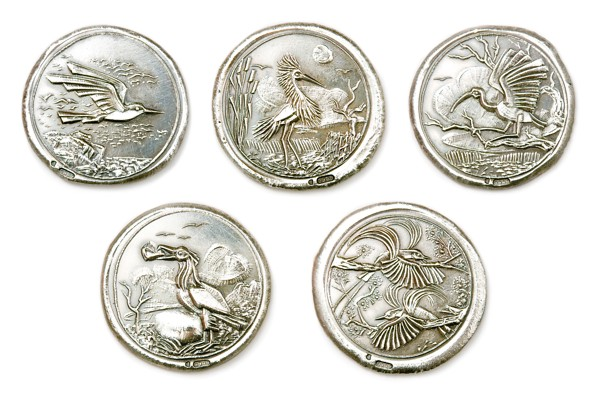
László Szlávics Jr.: Birds, 1988, silver, struck, 47mm

In the second half of the 1990s, he made use of natural materials (bone, feathers, seashells &c.,). These are original in style, and are on the fringe of the medal-genre (Cultic proto-money). As a counterpoint to this, he produced several series of medals using an industrial, where time – is measured by movements within the object – visible mode. (mechanical medals). The medals are activated by the active contribution of the public.

Since the start of the 21st century, he has tried to renew the medal arts, by searching for the limits. In 2006, Hungarian Medalists awarded him – the first – Ligeti Erika Prize. In 2007, he was awarded the Béni Ferenczy Prize, grand prix of the 16th National Biennial of Medal Art. Also in that year, he was among the two selected artists at the Art Medal World Congress FIDEM XXX (Colorado Springs, USA). In his small sculptures, he often used objets trouvés given new functions. (In memoriam Man Ray, An hour with Salvador Dalí , Hotline). This Interactive mobile sculptures are activated by the public.

Since 2008, he has produced many wooden small sculptures. Many of them are small sculptures, in the traditional sense, which, in a way, remind of houses and ruins. Large clock sculptures are related to the aforementioned both formally and technically. They are clearly contemporary works, of art, incorporating conventional devices such as the pendulum or spring mechanism, carrying out the functions of a clock. Every hour, and half hour the mark the time by striking the soundbar.

== Exhibitions (selection) ==
=== Group shows ===
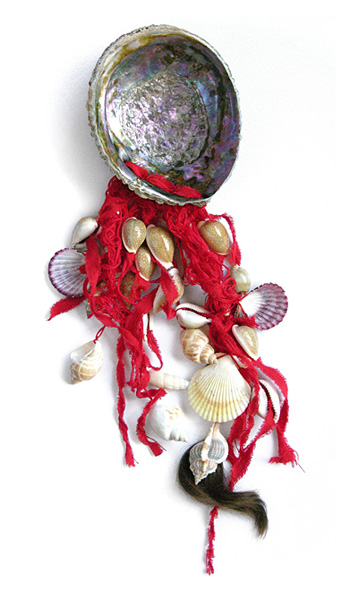
László Szlávics Jr.: Cultic proto-money, 2004, shell, textile, hair, mixed technique, 150 x 430 mm

Since 1975 his works have been exhibited in 15 countries. The most important are:

- 1981, 1983, 1985, 1987, 2005 National Biennial of Small Plastic, Pécs, Hungary
- Since 1983 every National Biennial of Medal Art, Sopron, Hungary
- 1988, 1992, 1996, 1998, 2000, 2002, 2005, 2008, 2010 National Wood Sculpture Exhibition, Nagyatád, Hungary
- 1991 – "brug tussen oost en west", Oudenbosch (Netherlands)
- 1994 – Small Sculpture '94, Gallery Vigadó, Budapest, Hungary
- Since 1994 every F.I.D.E.M. Medal Exhibitions (Budapest, Neuchâtel, The Hague, Weimar, Paris, Seixal, Colorado Springs, Tampere)
- 1995 – Email International 3, Coburg (Germany)
- 1995 – Helyzetkép/Hungarian sculpture, Kunsthalle Budapest, Hungary
- 1995 – Workshopcorner – Measuring Time, Museum of Applied Arts, Budapest, Hungary
- 1996 – 9th Cloisonne Jewelry Contest, Tokyo (Japan)
- 1996 – Workshopcorner – Jewels, Museum of Applied Arts, Budapest, Hungary
- 1996 – A Step into the Future, Applied Arts Exhibition, Kunsthalle, Budapest, Hungary
- 1997 – Magyar Szalon '97, Kunsthalle, Budapest, (Hungary)
- 1997 – VIIth International Biennale of Small Graphic Form and Ex-libris, Ostrów Wielkopolski (Polish)
- 2001 – Sculpture from here and beyond, Kunsthalle, Budapest, (Hungary)
- 2002 – Masaccio 600 International Art Medal Competition, Ein Vered, (Israel)
- 2004 – Dante Europeo XIV. Biennale Internazionale Dantesca, Ravenna (Italia)
- 2005, 2008, 2010 – International Biennial of Contemporary Medals of Seixal (Portuguese)
- 2005 – H. C. Andersen 200 International Art Medal Competition, Hadassa Neurim, (Israel)
- 2006 – The Way 1956–2006, National Fine Art Exhibition, Kunsthalle, Budapest, (Hungary)
- 2008 – Znad Dunaju Wełtawy i Wisły. Medalierzy i ich dzieła Wroclaw Museum of Medals, Wrocław (Polish).
- 2008 – 2009 Craft & Design, Museum of Applied Arts, Budapest, Hungary
- 2009 – Dedukció – 1st Biennale of Sculptures, Művészetmalom, Szentendre, Hungary

=== One man shows ===
Since 1977 he has had 50 one man shows in Hungary and other countries. The most important are:

- 1977 – Képzőművészeti Kivitelező Vállalat Klubja, Budapest, Hungary
- 1989 – BM Duna Palota, Budapest, Hungary
- 1991 – Galerie Simon, Altenahr, Germany
- 1995 – Gallery Géza Gárdonyi, Dunakeszi, Hungary
- 2002 – Collegium Hungaricum, Wien, Austria
- 2006 – Gallery Árkád (Association of Hungarian Fine and Applied Artists, Gallery, Budapest, Hungary)
- 2009 – "Fifty", Gallery Keve, Ráckeve, Hungary
- 2009 – Gallery Körmendi, Sopron, Hungary
- 2009 – Lábasház, Sopron, Hungary
- 2012 – "Síkplasztikáim", Symbol Art Gallery, 21 – 28 February 2012. Budapest, Hungary
- 2015 – "Za hranicami medailérstva...", NBS Múzeum Mincí a Medalí, Kremnica, Slovakia.

== Awards & Recognitions (selection) ==
The most important national or international awards:

- 1993 – Faces and Fates National Portrait Biennale, Budapest, Hungary, Golden Diploma, (Main Prize)
- 1996 – 9th Cloisonne Jewelry Contest Tokyo, Japan, Encouragement Prize
- 1996 – Head or Tails, Art medal exhibition, Budapest, Hungary, Grand Prix
- 1997 – 11th National Biennial of Medal Art, Sopron, Hungary, Civitas Fidelissima-prize (Prize of the Municipal City Government of Sopron, Silver Medals)
- 2000 – 7th National Wood Sculpture Exhibition, Nagyatád, Hungary, Prize of Nagyatád city.
- 2002 – Masaccio 600 International Art Medal Competition, Ein Vered, Israel, Special Mention
- 2003 – 14th 11th National Biennial of Medal Art, Sopron, Hungary, Civitas Fidelissima Prize (Prize of the Municipal City Government of Sopron, Silver Medals)
- 2003 – Jenő Rejtő Memorial Exhibition, Budapest, The Museum of Literature Petőfi, First prize
- 2006 – II. Articum International Biennial, Szolnok, Hungary, Sculpture Prize
- 2006 – Erika Ligeti prize
- 2007 – 16th National Biennial of Medal Art, 16th Hungarian Biennale of Medal Art, Sopron, Hungary, Béni Ferenczy Prize, The Grand Prize awarded by the Municipal Government of Győr-Moson-Sopron County
- 2007 – Art Medal World Congress FIDEM XXX, Colorado Springs, USA, "Honorable Mention"
- 2015 – 20th National Biennial of Medal Art, 20th Hungarian Biennale of Medal Art, Sopron, Hungary, Béni Ferenczy Prize, The Grand Prize awarded by the Municipal City Government of Sopron

== Collections which include work by László Szlávics Jr. (selection) ==
- Lajos Kassák Memorial Museum, Budapest, Hungary
- Military History Museum, Budapest, Hungary
- Museum of Applied Arts, Budapest, Hungary
- Hungarian National Gallery, Budapest, Hungary
- National Firebrigade Museum, Budapest, Hungary
- Museum of Győr-Moson-Sopron County is Sopron, Sopron, Hungary
- József Katona Museum, Kecskemét, Hungary
- Ottó Herman Museum, Miskolc, Hungary
- Hungarian National Museum, Budapest, Hungary
- Van Gogh Dokumentátiecentrum, Nuenen, Netherlands
- Rijksmuseum Het Koninklijk Penningkabinet, Leiden, Netherland
- "Basis" School of Sculpture Art Medal collection Ein Vered, Israel
- Centro Dantesco, Ravenna, Italia
- British Museum, London, United Kingdom
- University Museum of Bergen, Norway
- Muzeum Sztuki Medalierskiej, Wrocław, Poland
- NBS – Múzeum mincí a medailí Kremnica, Slovakia
- Collection of Drs. Miklós Müller and Jan S. Keithly - New York, United States

== Buildings which display his work ==
- 1979 – Comedy Theatre of Budapest, Budapest, Hungary
- 1988 – János Damjanich bust, Szeged, Hungary
- 1989 – Miklós Zrínyi bust, Székesfehérvár, Hungary
- 1990 – Artúr Görgey bust, Ministry of National Defence, Budapest, Hungary
- 1992 – Saint Florian relief, Budapest, Hungary
- 2006 – János Tornyai bust, Hódmezővásárhely, Hungary
- 2006 – Frigyes Karinthy (writer) portrait, Karinthy Teatre, Budapest, Hungary
- 2007 – Count István Széchenyi bust, Seafaring Secondary School, Budapest, Hungary
- 2009 – Ferenc Liszt bust, Sopron Music School, Sopron, Hungary
- 2010 – John Lennon bust, Sopron Music School, Sopron, Hungary
- 2012 – Ferenc Liszt bust, Universiti of West Hungary Savaria Campus, Szombathely, Hungary
- 2012 – István Örkény portrait, Zsigmond Móricz City Library, Tata, Hungary
- 2013 – Janis Joplin bust, Ferenc Erkel Grade School, Budapest, Hungary

== Medals ad small sculptures (selection) ==
- 1992 – Ferenc Flór Prize, memorial plaque and badge, Ministry of National Defence,
- 1992 – János Hunyadi Prize, memorial plaque and badge, Ministry of National Defence, Hungary
- 1992 – Miklós Zrínyi Prize, memorial plaque and badge, Ministry of National Defence, Hungary
- 1996 – Nemzeti Minőségi Díj, small sculpture, Hungary's prime minister
- 1998 – For the Children of the World, UNICEF 2000–forint, silver memorial coin, Hungarian National Bank
- 1999 – István Menyhárd Prize, small sculpture, Hungarian Chamber of Engineers
- 2000 – Gejza Ferdinandy Prize, memorial plaque and badge, Ministry of National Defence, Hungary
- 2000 – Szilárd Zielinski Prize, small sculpture, Hungarian Chamber of Engineers
- 2001 – Figures is Hungarian books for young people, 200–forint, memorial coin, Hungarian National Bank
  - Ferenc Molnár: A Pál utcai fiúk
  - Mihály Fazekas: Lúdas Matyi
  - Sándor Petőfi: János Vitéz
  - János Arany: Toldi
- 2001 – Imre Pekár Prize, small sculpture, Chamber of Engineers, Hajdú–Bihar County.
- 2001 – László Csány Prize, small sculpture, Hungarian Chamber of Engineers
- 2002 – Pál Hajnik Prize, memorial plaque and badge, Ministry of National Defence, Hungary
- 2003 – András Hadik Prize, memorial plaque and badge, Ministry of National Defence, Hungary
- 2004 – Pécsi ókeresztény sírkamrák, 5000-forint, silver, memorial coin, Hungarian National Bank
- 2005 – Lázár Mészáros Prize, memorial plaque and badge, Ministry of National Defence, Hungary
- 2006 – Gyula Andrássy Prize, memorial plaque and badge, Ministry of National Defence, Hungary
- 2007 – 550 anniversary of accession of King Mathias Corvinus , 50.000.–forint, gold, memorial coin, Hungarian National Bank
- 2007 – Bishop Lajos Ordass Prize, small sculpture and memorial plaque, Hungarian Lutheran Church
- 2007 – Sándor Prónay Prize, small sculpture and memorial plaque, Hungarian Lutheran Church
- 2008 – John Calvin memorial medals, Hungarian Calvinist Church
- 2009 – 200th Anniversary of birth of Ferenc Erkel, 5000-forint, memorial coin, Hungarian National Bank. Collector-series "The smallest gold coin of the world".
- 2010 – 200th Anniversary of birth of Adam Clark, 5000-forint, memorial coin, Hungarian National Bank. Collector-series "The smallest gold coin of the world".

== Memberships ==
- 1984 – Association of Hungarian Creative Artists
- 1991 – Association of Hungarian Fine and Applied Artists, Medal Section.
- 1995 – FIDEM, Fédération Internationale de la Médaille d'Art.
- 1996 – 1998 British Art Medal Society (BAMS).
- 1997 – Százados úti Művésztelep Egyesület.
- 2007 – Association of Hungarian Fine and Applied Artists, Goldsmith Section.
- 2008 – Association of Hungarian Fine and Applied Artists, Sculpture Section.

== Offices Held ==
- 1989 – 1992 Aurea Arts & Crafts Association Member of the Executive.
- 1992 – 1999 Aurea Art Support Trust Member of the Executive.
- 1995 – 2023 ART '95 Limited Partnership Founding President.
- 2000 – Association of Hungarian Fine and Applied Artists Medal Section member of the Executive.
- 2004 – Association of Hungarian Fine and Applied Artists Medal Section President.
- 2004 – 2023 Association of Hungarian Fine and Applied Artists member of the Presidium.
- 2005 – National Biennial of Medal Art member of the Organizing Committee.
- 2015 – 2019 Association of Hungarian Fine and Applied Artists Sculpture Section President.

== Gallery ==
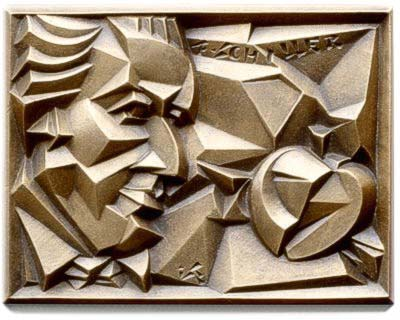
László Szlávics Jr.: F. Schiller, bronze, cast, 140 x 185 mm, 1991

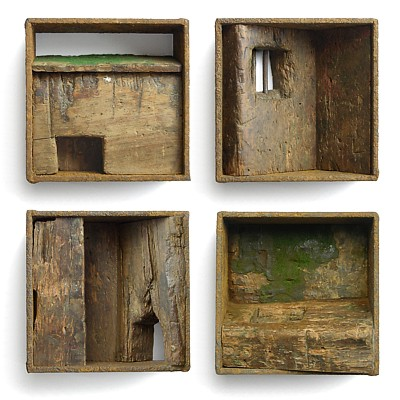
László Szlávics Jr.: On the road, 2005, wood, iron, textile, mixed technique,

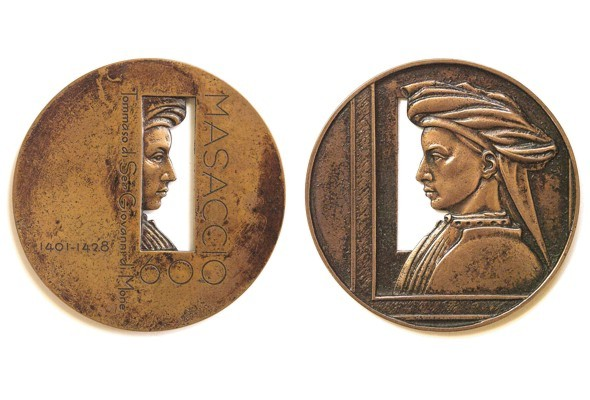
László Szlávics Jr.: Masaccio, memorial medal, 2002, bronze, cast, 110mm

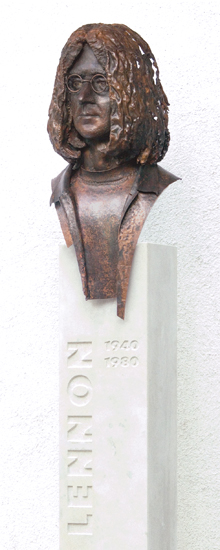
László Szlávics Jr.: John Lennon bust, 2010, Sopron, Hungary

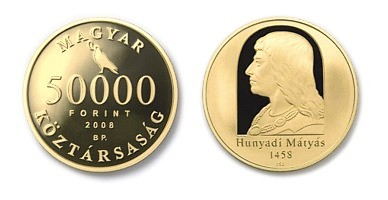
László Szlávics Jr.: Mátyás Hunyadi, memorial coin, (Hungarian forint) 2008,

László Szlávics Jr.: John Calvin, memorial medal, 2008, bronze, cast, 110mm
