= Hableány disaster =

2019 maritime incident in Hungary

Sinking of Hableány
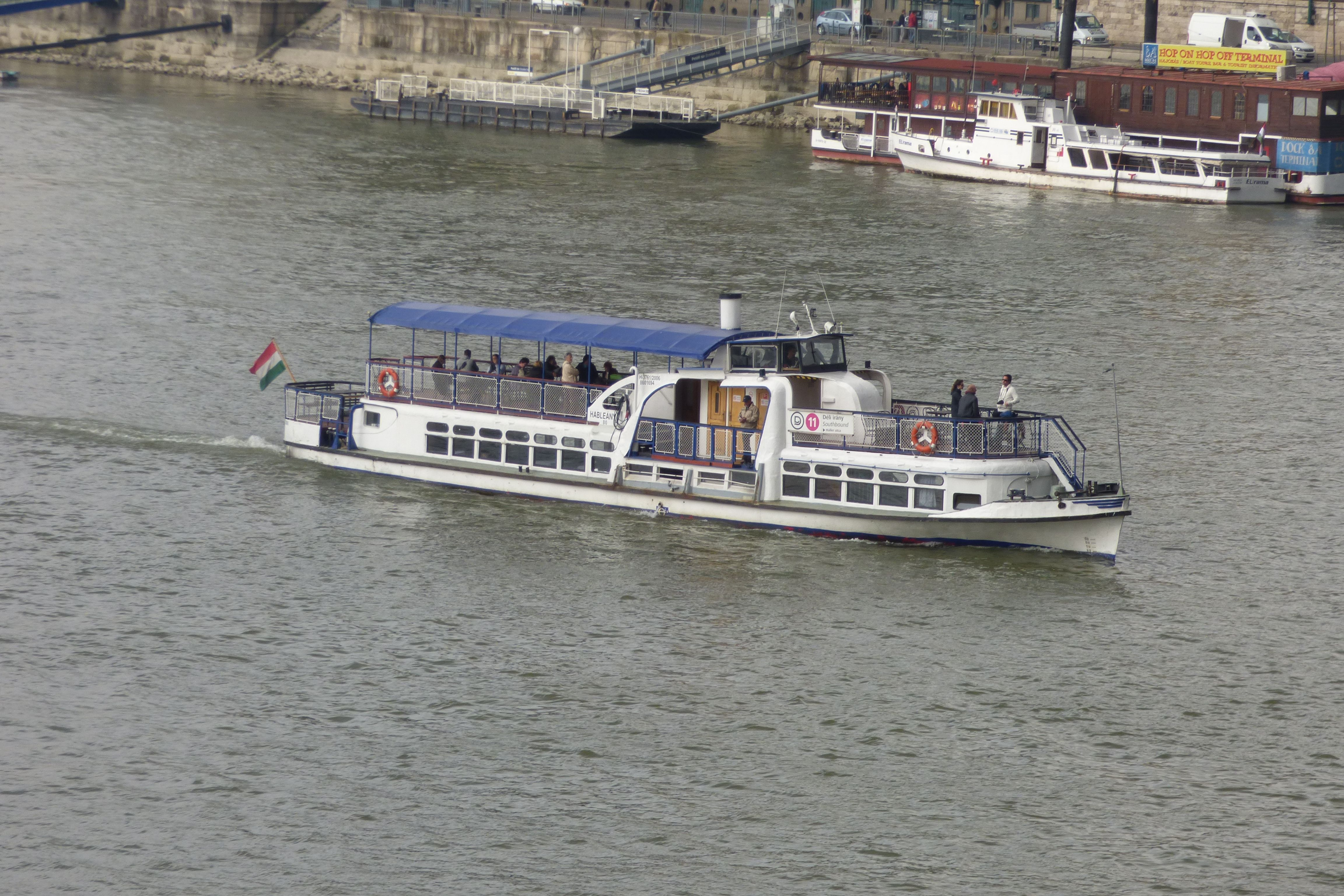
- Hableány seen in April 2017

- Location of collision

Details
- Date: 29 May 2019; 7 years ago 9:05 PM CEST (UTC+2)
- Location: Danube River
- Coordinates: 47°30′50″N 19°02′42″E
- Country: Budapest, Hungary
- Cause: Collision with another vessel

Statistics
- Passengers: 33
- Crew: 2
- Deaths: 27
- Injured: 7
- Missing: 1 (as of 15 October 2019)

Hableány ([ˈhɒblɛaːɲ]; Hungarian for 'Mermaid') was a 27-metre (89 ft) river cruiser operated on the Danube river in Budapest, Hungary. On the rainy night of May 29, 2019, at 9:05 pm the 135-metre (443 ft) Viking Sigyn collided with Hableány from behind under the Margaret Bridge near the Parliament Building. Hableány sank in 7 seconds. The heavy rainfall and the resulting strong currents hampered rescue efforts, with some bodies found 100 km downstream. With 2 Hungarian crew and 33 South Korean tourists on board, 7 tourists were rescued at the scene; one person is still missing and all others were later found to be dead.

== Vessels ==
Hableány was a 27-metre (89 ft) Moskvitch-class river cruise boat with two open decks and a capacity of 45 passengers for sightseeing and 60 passengers for other configurations. She was built in Kherson, Soviet Ukraine in 1949 and had her engine replaced in 1980 by a Hungarian company. She was acquired by Panorama Deck in 2003 and had been used for regular cruises on the Danube since then. She had two decks and a capacity of 45 people when operating as a sightseeing vessel.

Viking Sigyn is a 135-metre (443 ft) river-cruising "longship" operated by Swiss-based Viking River Cruises. She has four decks with 95 rooms and can carry 190 passengers. The ship was christened in March 2019 and placed on the company's Danube routes.

== Sinking ==
The official technical report regarding the collision was released to the media in July 2020. The following paragraph is written based on earlier inaccurate report.

At 9:05 pm local time on May 29, 2019, the River Cruise Hableány was rammed amidships portside by Viking Sigyn while crossing under the Margaret Bridge near the Parliament Building on a 457-metre-wide (500 yd) section of the Danube. Hableány had 35 people on board at the time of the collision, including the Hungarian captain and crewman, two South Korean tour guides, and 31 South Korean tourists ranging in age from 6 to 72. The tourists were on a two-week excursion of eastern Europe organized by the Seoul-based Very Good Tour company.

Following a review of CCTV footage from a nearby vantage point, the police stated that Hableány had capsized under the Margaret Bridge. The vessel had been moving upstream towards the left riverbank to prepare for disembarking and steered left into the path of Viking Sigyn, which had been traveling parallel to Hableány. The rescued passengers had not been wearing life vests, while another South Korean tourist said that cruise boats arranged by tour companies often lacked them. All seven of the rescued survivors had been thrown from the upper observation deck.

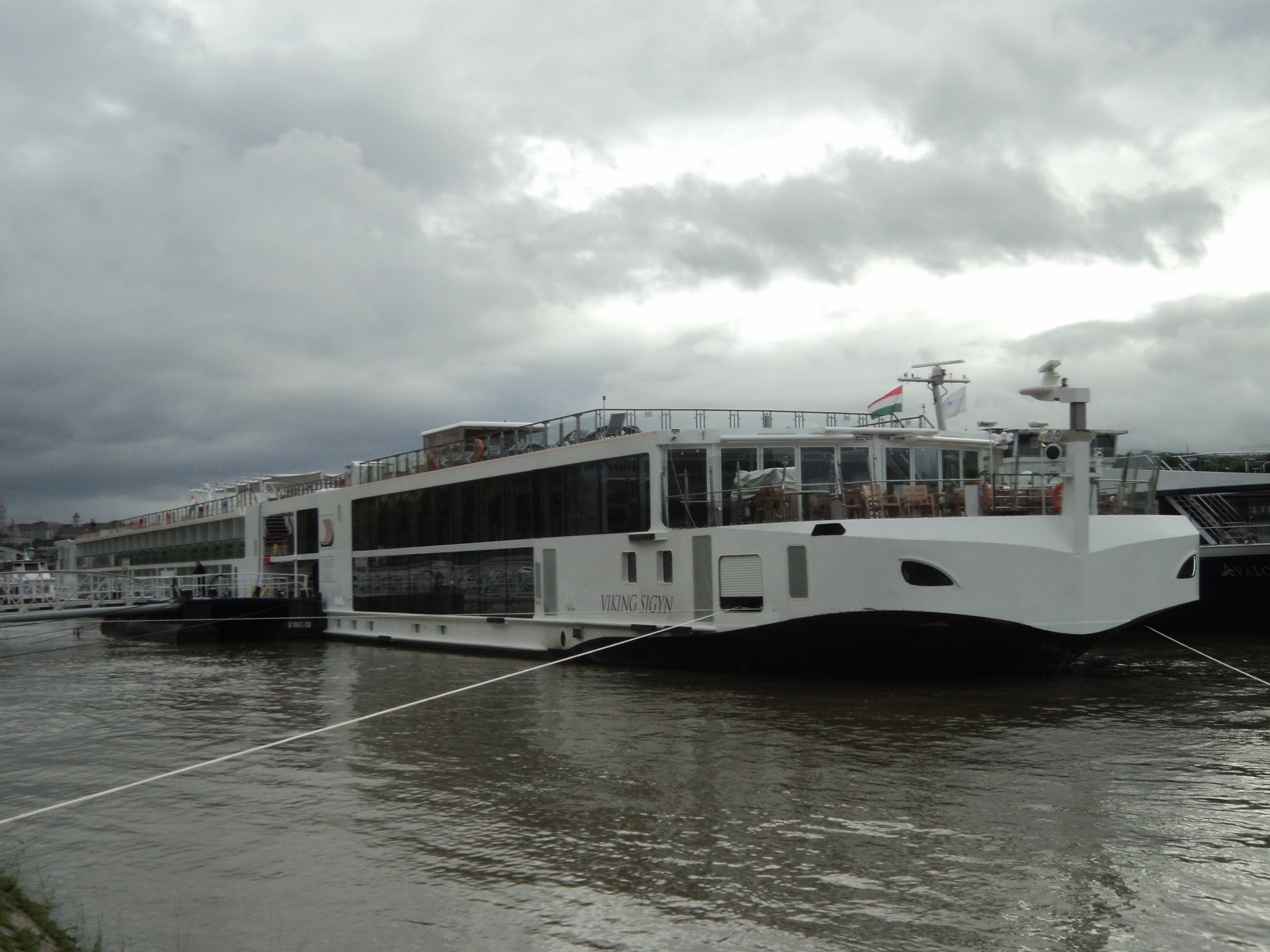
Viking Sigyn, operated by Viking Cruises, seen a day after the collision

Nationality	Passengers	Crew	Total	Fatalities	Missing	Survivors
South Korea	33	0	33	25	1	7
Hungary	0	2	2	2	0	0
Total	33	2	35	27	1	7

== Rescue ==
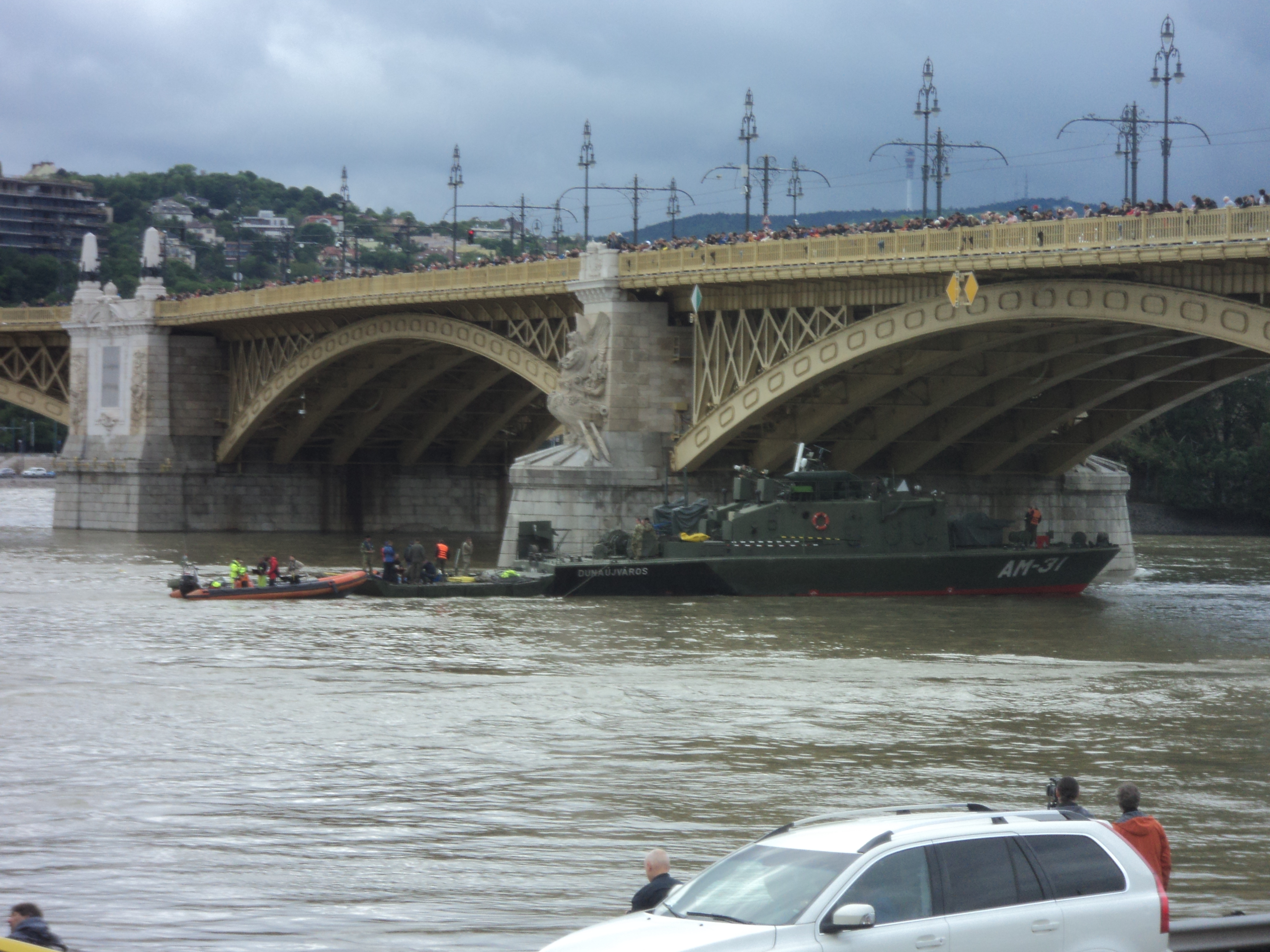
Hungarian minesweeper AM-31 Dunaújváros conducting search operations under the Margaret Bridge

Police and ambulance services arrived at the collision site approximately ten minutes later at 9:15, shortly after being notified of an overturned boat. Search and rescue efforts began immediately, with several spotlights brought to the site and over 200 divers and medical personnel arriving within hours. Search and rescue efforts were complicated by the high water level of the Danube, which had swelled significantly due to several days of heavy rainfall, by high winds and by water temperatures of 10 to 12 °C (50 to 54 °F). The fast-moving water, reaching speeds of 9 to 11 kilometres per hour (5.6 to 6.8 mph), caused limited visibility underwater and prevented divers from searching inside the wreckage of Hableány to recover more bodies.

Seven of the South Korean tourists were rescued from the water and taken to local hospitals where they were treated for hypothermia and shock. Most were later released. Seven bodies were also pulled from the river, which were identified using finger and palm prints; 19 tourists and the two crewmembers remained missing. Several of the rescued passengers were found further downstream, including one at the Petőfi Bridge approximately 3 kilometres (2 mi) south; one of the recovered bodies was found 12 kilometres (7.5 mi) downstream almost 2.5 hours after the collision.

The first major diving operation began five days after the collision and ended with the discovery of an eighth body that was recovered by Korean divers. János Hajdu, the head of the Counter Terrorism Centre coordinating the search and rescue efforts told reporters that the divers will do everything in their power to search for bodies and survivors but entering the wreckage was forbidden, as they had deemed it life-threatening. Another body was found on the same day in Harta, 110 kilometres (68 mi) downstream from Budapest, by local police.

In the morning of 4 June, the sixth day, the body recovered from the wreck one day prior, was identified by the police as a Korean woman, making her the ninth known victim of the accident. After a six-hour-long diving operation, the tenth victim was raised from the ship. Police also reported that they had found and identified the eleventh passenger at the town of Kulcs. The twelfth passenger had been found at Adony.

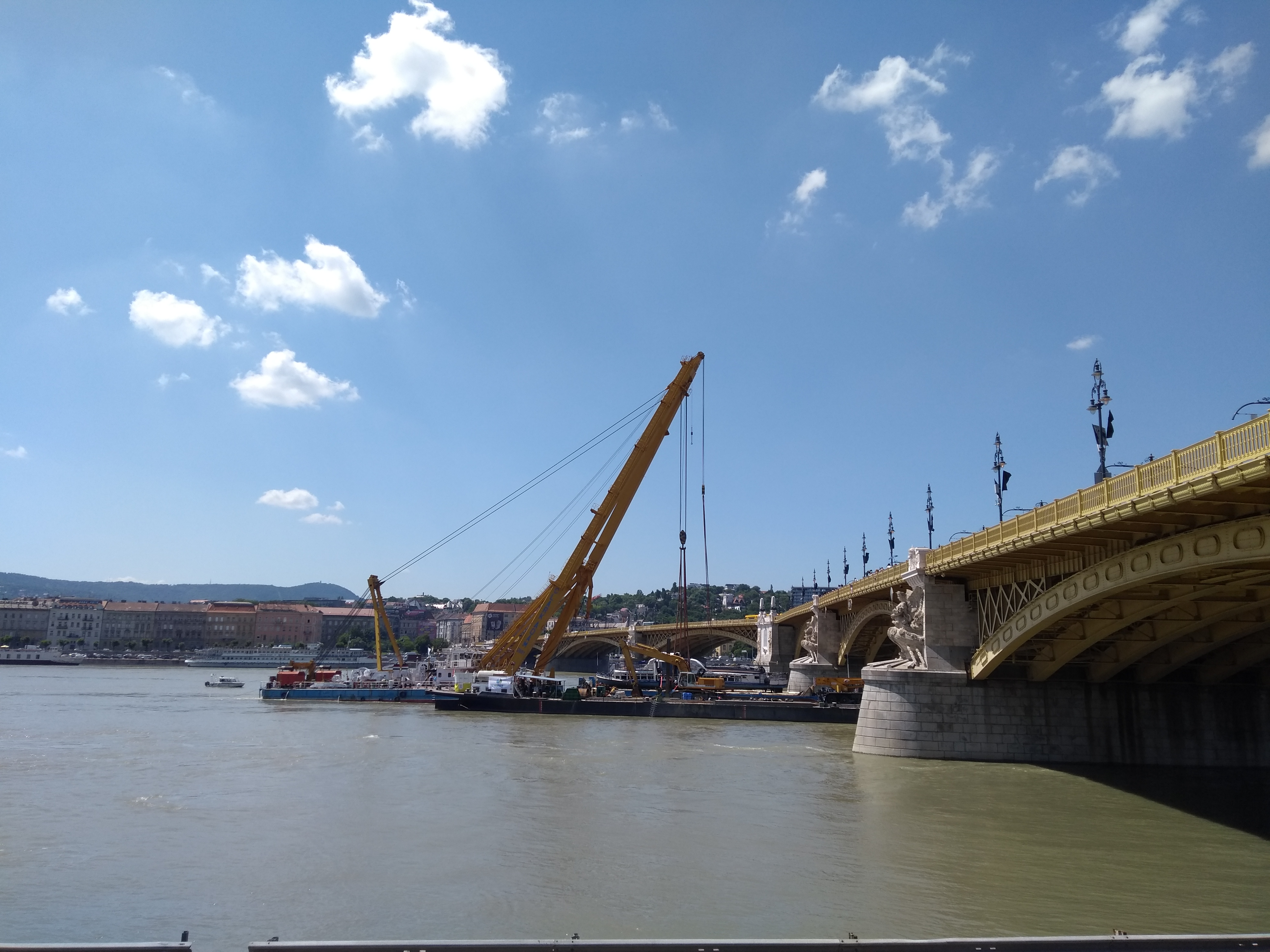
Floating crane Clark Ádám raising the Hableány

TEK announced on 5 June that they had recovered another passenger from the wreck. Later that night a police statement explained that the body of a female passenger had been retrieved from the Danube in the afternoon, close to the site of the accident, and another had been found and identified at Ercsi. Throughout on 6 June, three victims had been found near the Rákóczi Bridge, Érd and the Liberty Bridge. The latter one was identified as a crew member of Hableány. On 8 June, another body of a female passenger was found in Százhalombatta, who was identified as a victim of the shipwreck on the next day. As on the morning of 9 June 2019, 20 victims had been found dead, while 7 passengers and the Hungarian captain of the boat remained missing. The Danube Water Police recovered a male victim from the Danube between Bölcske and Madocsa late in the afternoon of 12 June 2019. The search team were continuing to locate the bodies of three South Korean passengers somewhere on the river downstream of the Margaret Bridge as far as the southern state border. On 22 June 2019 a corpse was found in the water, near the Csepel Island. The identification of the body was carried out, the woman so far looked for as a missing person is a victim of the Danube boat accident of 29 May 2019. On 5 July 2019 the patrols of the search team found a corpse in the riverwash of the Danube in the region of Makád, who was identified on 6 July as a missing person of the Danube shipwreck. On 31 May the Ministry of Interior announced that attempts to lift and recover Hableány during the first two days had been unsuccessful and that it was seeking new ways to search the lower deck for trapped passengers. As of 6 June 2019, divers were attaching a harness so the sunken boat might be recovered by a 200-ton lift capacity floating crane, the Clark Ádám; water levels at that time were too high to begin the salvage operation. On 7 June the crane was still positioned near the Margaret Bridge as the rescue team would not risk deploying it with a rising water level, even though the crane was ready.

== Salvage ==
The authorities used Clark Ádám, a crane vessel with a 200-ton lift capacity, to lift the sunken ship from the bottom of the Danube. On 11 June, the lifting work began at around 6:30 a.m. local time. A floating crane raised the boat from waters beneath the Margit Bridge and was reported via live television. Less than 30 minutes into the salvage work, the ship's steering room appeared. Two divers were sent in to search and discovered a body, believed to be the Hungarian captain. By 8:30 a.m. four bodies had been found, three of them believed to be South Koreans (including the only child victim, a six-year-old girl), that had been located in the wreck. The boat was finally deposited on a barge by the floating crane. Thereafter, Hableány was transferred to Csepel Island to further police, nautical and technical examinations.

== Response of South Korea ==
South Korean President Moon Jae-in sent emergency rescue workers to aid the Hungarian effort, including several who had worked on the Sewol disaster off South Korea in 2014. South Korean foreign minister Kang Kyung-wha travelled to Budapest. A week after the incident, the Hungarian embassy in Seoul announced that relatives of the victims and members of the Korean authorities could travel free of charge between Seoul and Budapest, in cooperation with LOT Polish Airlines. By 6 June, identification of the deceased passengers had started, with assistance by South Korean police.

== Investigation ==
The Transportation Safety Bureau investigates maritime accidents in Hungary.

The technical report regarding the collision itself was released to the media in July 2020. The reconstructed scene of collision is discussed in earlier paragraphs of this article.

On 8 June 2019, the Budapest Metropolitan Police issued the first press release of its findings. The police found the captain of the sunken Hableány not responsible for the collision, based upon expert opinion. In October 2019, a separate investigation was underway to find out whether Viking Idun, a sister ship of the Viking Sigyn, which it was following not far behind when the collision occurred, failed to offer aid to victims of the collision.

== Legal proceedings ==
The captain of the Viking Sigyn, Yuri Chaplinsky (also known as Yuri C.), a 64-year-old Ukrainian, was the only suspect. The court case began in March 2020 with prosecutors' accusation. The captain gave his account of the events for the first time in June and in September 2020.

In March 2020, prosecutors charged Chaplinsky for "reckless misconduct in waterborne traffic leading to mass casualties" and "35 counts of failure to provide assistance" after the collision. During trial, prosecutors accused him for "distracted for personal reasons" during the crucial first five minutes after his ship left its mooring and "did not radio or send out emergency sound signals". In September 2023, Chaplinsky was sentenced to five years in prison after being found guilty of gross negligence, though he was acquitted on the charge of failure to provide help.
