= Moskvitch-class motorship =

Series of Soviet passenger river ships

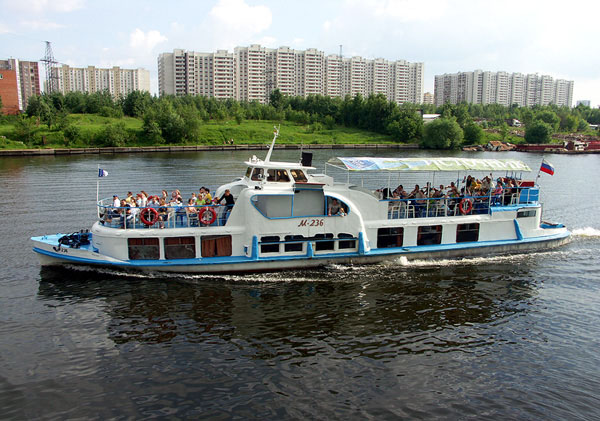
Moskvich in Moscow

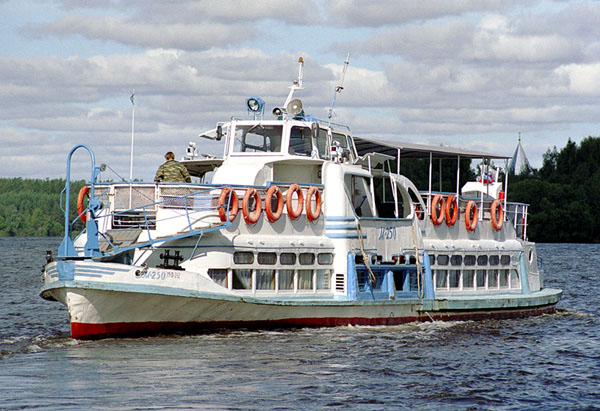
Moskvich in Kalyazin

Moskvitch (Russian: Москвич) (projects 515, 544, 554) is a series of Soviet local passenger river ships.

The first Moskvich ships were built in 1948 in the Moscow factory of shipbuilding. Moskvich ships did not receive names, only numbers. They were identified by the letter M followed by the ship's number, for example M-270. Later though, some ships owned by private operators have received their own names. Moskvichs were built in Moscow until the 1960s.

Moskvich ships were used for short sightseeing trips, but also as a type of public transport, called “water tramway” (concept similar to water taxi). As of 2007, many Moskvichs are still in service. Most of them are used for sightseeing, some are used as sailing restaurants.

== Technical specifications ==
- Length: 27.25 m (89 ft 5 in)
- Beam: 4.8 m (15 ft 9 in)
- Draft: 0.7–0.8 m (2 ft 4 in – 2 ft 7 in)
- Height from water to deck: 1.4 m (4 ft 7 in)
- Maximum height: 5.08 m (16 ft 8 in)
- Speed: 17–20 km/h (10.6–12.4 mph)
- Engine: diesel engine 150 or 170 hp (110 or 130 kW)
- Passenger capacity: 150 maximum

== Modifications ==
Type Moskvich ships were also built in Kherson, Ukraine. These ships were almost completely the same as Moscow-build Moskvich, as they were built according to the same project (544), but they were identified as type PT ships.

Similar ships were built in Leningrad also. Leningrad-build ships were almost the same as Moscow-build ships, but their superstructure was little bit lower than on Moscow-build ships. The reason was that Leningrad had many low bridges. Leningrad-built ships are known as Leningradets-type ships, project 564K.

== Accidents ==
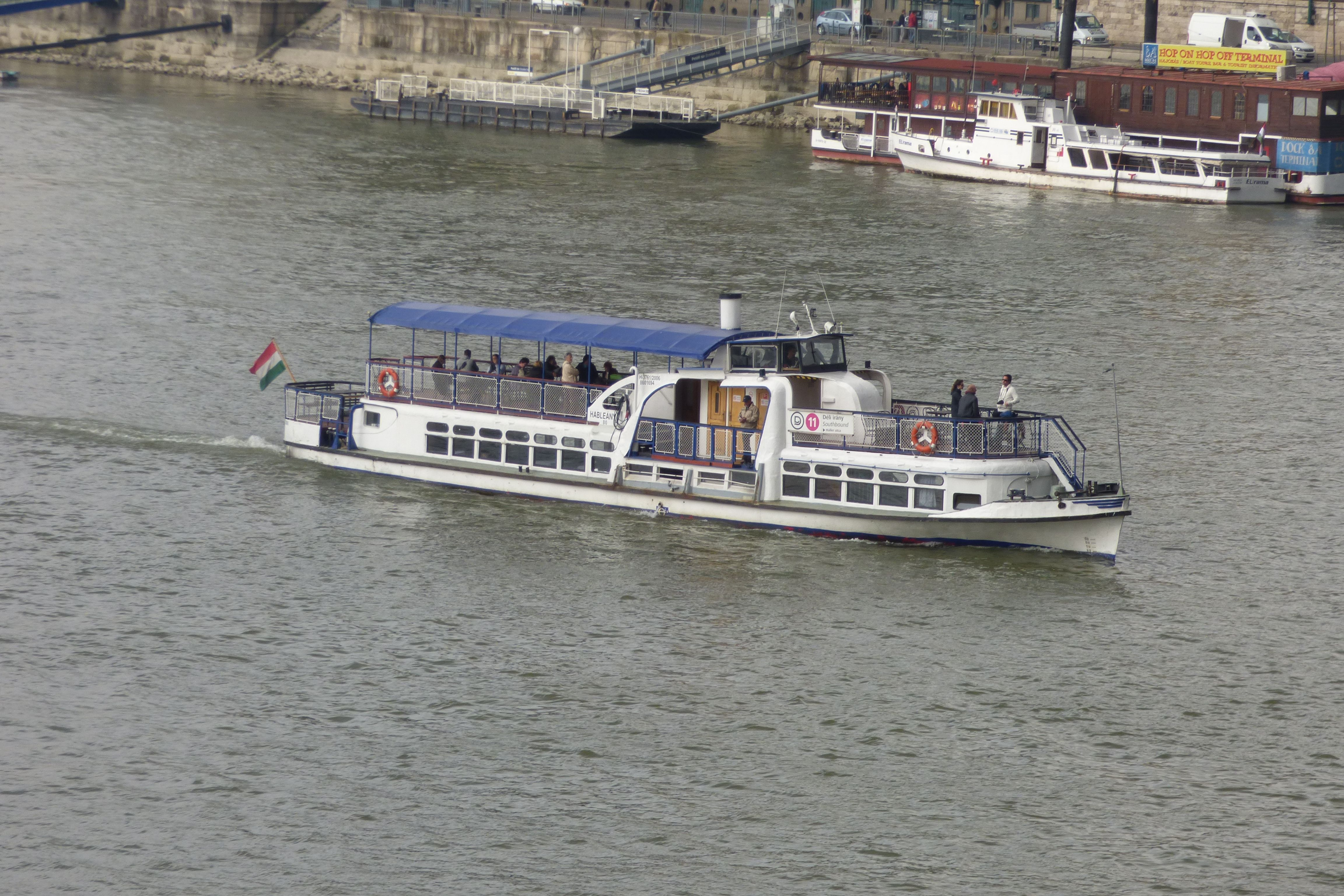
Hableány in 2017

- On October 6, 1968 in Cheboksary, the M–176 collided with a reefer on the Volga River and sank. 51 passengers were killed, 10 injured.
- On May 29, 2019 in Budapest, the Hableány collided with the cruise ship Viking Sigyn on the Danube, and sank. 26 passengers and 2 crewmen were killed, 7 survived.

== Sources ==
- Russian river ships – local sail ships
- Technical specifications
- Technical drawing
- Technical specifications
