= Pentele Bridge (Hungary) =

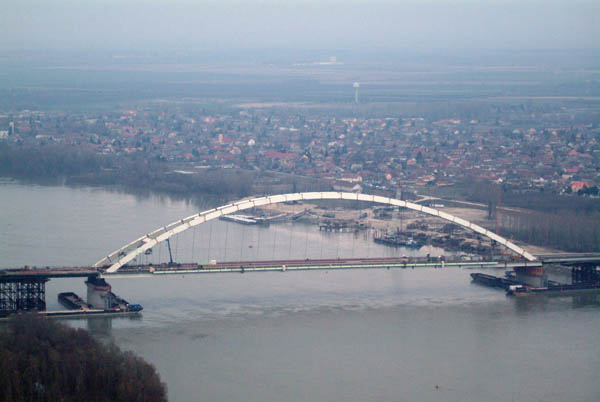
- Coordinates: 46°54′12″N 18°57′30″E
- Carries: 4 lanes of M8 motorway E66, pedestrians and bicycles
- Crosses: Danube
- Locale: Between Dunaújváros and Dunavecse

Characteristics
- Design: Basket handle tied-arch
- Total length: 1,682 m (1.045 mi)
- Width: 41 m (135 ft)
- Height: 47.6 m (156 ft)
- Longest span: 308 m (0.191 mi)

History
- Opened: 2007

Location
- Interactive map of Pentele Bridge

The Pentele Bridge or M8 Danube Bridge is a highway bridge spanning river Danube between Dunavecse and Dunaújváros. Construction was completed on 13 March 2007. The Pentele Bridge got her name after the village Dunapentele (now part of Dunaújváros). The bridge is 1,682 m (5,518 ft) in length and 21 m (69 ft) wide, its main basket handle tied-arch span of 308 m (1,010 ft) ranks 60th among the longest arch bridge spans. It is part of the planned M8 motorway, connecting M6 motorway on the west and highway 51 on the east bank.

== Design and construction ==
The bridge's full length is 1,682 m (5,518 ft), of which the approaches make up 1,067 m (3,501 ft) on the right bank (From Dunaújváros) and 300 m (980 ft) on the left, while the main river span is a steel basket handle tied-arch of 308 m (1,010 ft) length. The river bridge's superstructure rests on two reinforced concrete pillars in the river bed, the right approach is supported by 14, the left one by 5 pillars. The deck is 40.94 m (134.3 ft) wide and carries 2×2 road lanes (3.75 m), 2×1 stopping lanes (3.5 m) a 3.6 m-wide separating line, and on both sides, a 2.4 m-wide pedestrian and bike path. The river bridge is 50 m (160 ft) high, and weighs about 8600 tonnes with all the structures excluding pavement. The arches rise 47.6 meters above the carriageway and are tilted inwards at an angle of 16.5° from vertical resembling a basket handle. The suspension cables run parallel, in the plane of the arches.

The main section of the bridge was assembled on the shore and floated in place using 8 barges of 1600 ton capacity each.

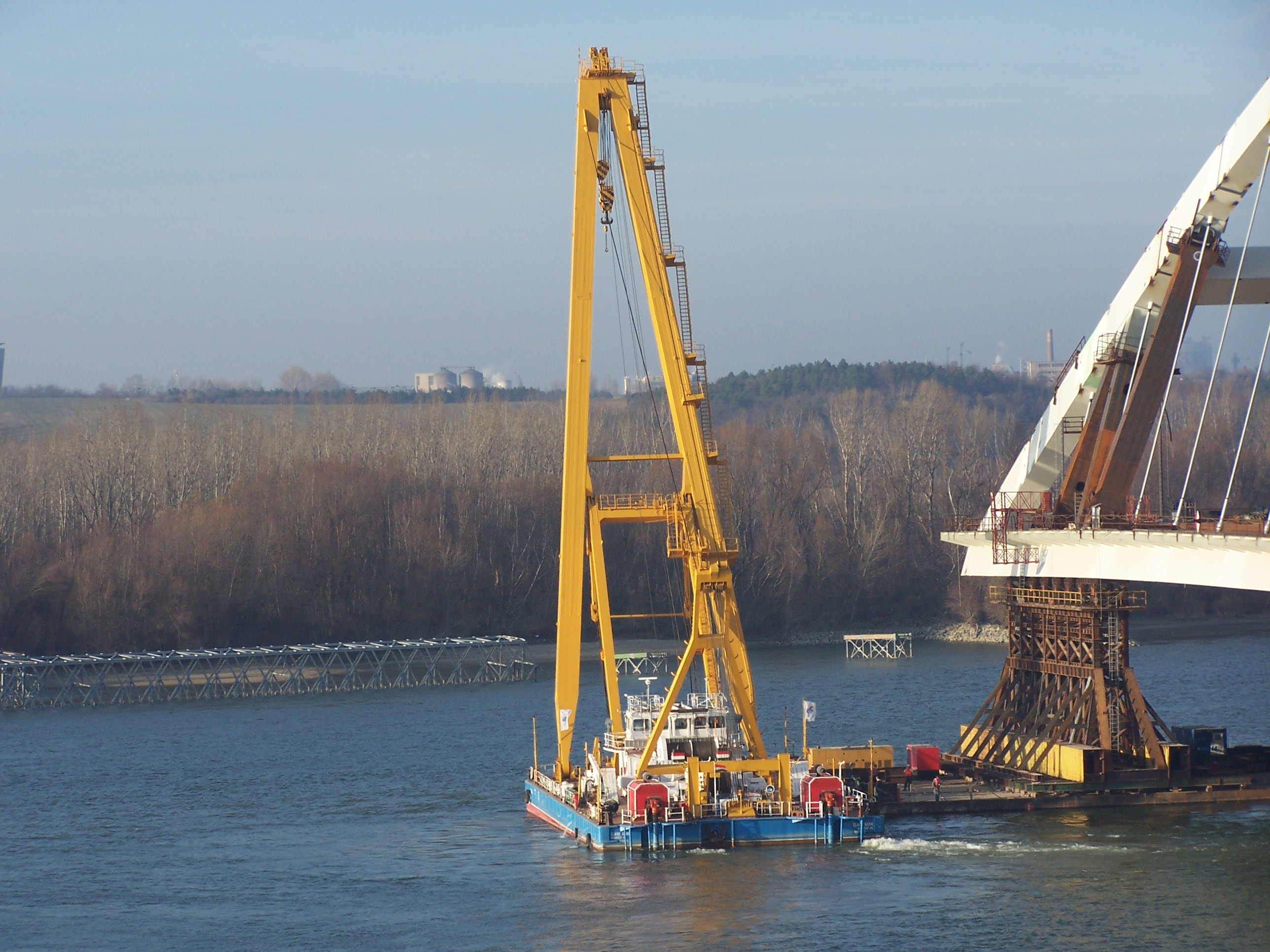
Floating crane Clark Ádám building the Pentele Bridge

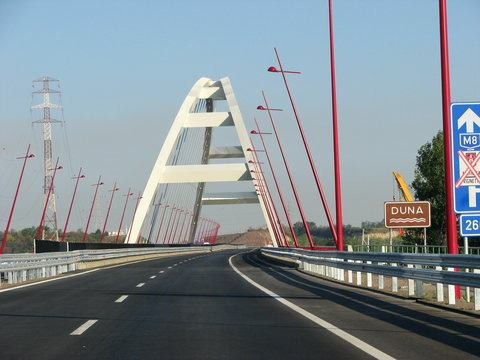
Entrance to the bridge, showing a sign for the M8 motorway

== See also ==
- List of crossings of the Danube River
