= Makád =

Coordinates: 47°23′N 21°54′E

- Interactive map of Makád
- Country: Hungary
- County: Pest

Population (2025)
  - Total: 1,206
- Time zone: UTC+1 (CET)
  - Summer (DST): UTC+2 (CEST)
- Postal code: 2322
- Area code: 24

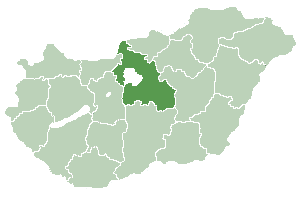
Location of Pest County in Hungary.

Makád is a village in the county of Pest, Hungary, near Hungary's capital Budapest.

== Twin towns - twin cities ==
- Umbria – Italy
- Sighișoara – Romania
