= The American Pavilion =

Film festival organization

The American Pavilion is an organization for American participants of the Cannes Film Festival. Every year, it provides a wide range of programming to Cannes, as well as "communications, hospitality, media center and a seaside meeting place for global attendees."

== History ==
In 1989, The American Pavilion was founded by Julie Sisk.

In 2022, the organization was acquired by Penske Media Corporation.

== Cannes Programming ==
=== California Day ===
On April 15, 2025, The American Pavilion announced the inaugural "California Day" event for May 15, near the beginning of the 2025 Cannes Film Festival, in order to celebrate California's contributions to the history, development, and industry of filmmaking. Partners of California Day include IndieWire, Visit California, and California Film Commission. Event programming includes a keynote address, panels, and networking events.

=== Culinary Program ===
Through The American Pavilion's Culinary Program, chefs from the United States and Canada are spotlighted at Cannes.

=== Emerging Filmmaker Showcase ===
Every year, at Cannes, The American Pavilion organizes a showcase of films by emerging filmmakers, many of whom are often students, with live questions-and-answers sessions for each screening. Prize-winning films are announced throughout the Cannes Film Festival. Previous directors spotlighted by the program include Jeff Nichols, Ryan Coogler, and others.

In 2025, for the 28th iteration of the Emerging Filmmaker Showcase, 25 films were officially selected for three categories: Student Short Films & Documentaries, Emerging Filmmaker Short Films & Documentaries, and the Emerging Filmmaker LGBTQ+. The 2025 showcase was sponsored by Gold House.

=== House Party ===
In partnership with Gold House, The American Pavilion also hosts a summit on diversity and emerging voices at Cannes.

=== "Industry in Focus" Series ===
The American Pavilion's Cannes programming includes talks involving various members of the film industry, such as executives, journalists, producers, and others. In 2022, representatives from Adobe, Bleecker Street, Live Nation Entertainment, South by Southwest, and Cinetic Media, among other companies, headed panel events.

=== "In Conversation" Series ===
Additionally, at Cannes, The American Pavilion hosts conversations with actors, directors, and other high-profile figures in the film industry. Paul Dano, Demi Moore, Billy Zane, Spike Lee, and Frederick Wiseman have been among those hosted. At the 2022 Cannes Film Festival, David Lynch partnered with Xavatar and Planet X Studios to launch "The Art of Movie Music," an hour-long panel utilizing avatar technology for "real-time animation" of panel attendees, including Lynch himself.

=== Screen Talk ===
During Cannes, The American Pavilion venue hosts live tapings of Indiewire's Screen Talk podcast.

=== Queer Night ===
In 2006, Sisk and John Cameron Mitchell launched an annual Queer Night celebration at Cannes to create an LGBTQ-inclusive social space for festival-goers.

=== Worldwide Student Program ===
To certain partnered institutions, The American Pavilion provides internships, networking events, industry talks, and other opportunities to get students involved in film festivals and the entertainment industry as a whole to hundreds of students per year. In addition to Cannes, The American Pavilion has also branched out to other film festivals like the Venice Film Festival and South by Southwest in Austin and London.

The program also includes annual video contests for the prize of a program scholarship. In 2019, The American Pavilion launched the Colin Higgins Ambassador Scholarship to support the participation of LGBTQ students in the program.

Filmmaker Jeff Nichols, at the age of 21, was an intern for The American Pavilion.

== Controversy ==
In 2022, dozens of college students reported "broken promises, cramped living conditions, long, unpaid hours at menial jobs and exposure to inappropriate behavior" during their experiences interning at The American Pavilion at Cannes despite paying "on average $4,000 apiece" to attend. (Some students reported upwards of $6,000 total.) Blogger Stephen Follows spoke with many interns who felt "highly disillusioned by the experience, which they said failed miserably to live up to what they were sold and often put students in perilous situations."

Specifically, Follows observed five problem areas of the internship program: the "pay to work" system, the demanding yet unpaid "menial service," the lackluster accommodations provided, the "poor Covid response," and the "inappropriate behavior" of festival-goers toward typically younger interns. Of the latter, some interns reported being told to go to parties, having uncomfortable conversations with "older men," facing "racist, sexist and homophobic remarks" from certain companies, and getting into Ubers without any further details. One anonymous intern said that "I haven't spoke to one woman that has worked an event and not felt uncomfortable at some point."

The American Pavilion lamented that Follows had not spoken with them about the widespread allegations beforehand, though they did not specifically respond to any claims of mistreatment.
