= WestEnd City Center =

Westend Shopping Center
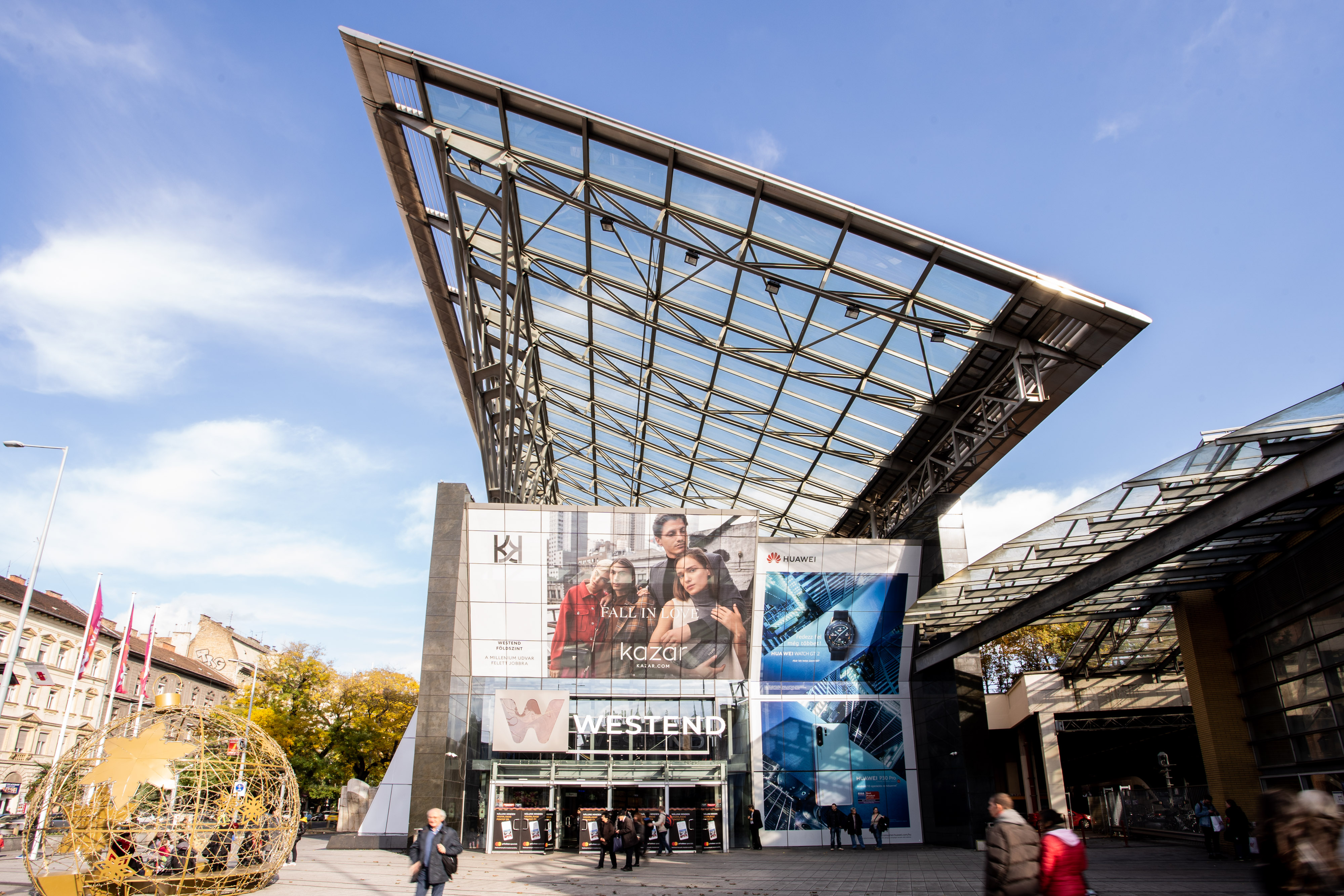
- Westend Shopping Center, South Entrance
- Location: Budapest, Hungary
- Coordinates: 47°30′42.21″N 19°3′26.97″E
- Address: 1062 Budapest, Váci Road 1-3
- Opened: 1999
- Developer: TriGránit
- Owner: TriGránit
- Num. of stores: 400+
- Num. of anchor tenants: 16
- Floor area: 186,000 m^{2} (2,000,000 sq ft)
- Floors: 4 floors including Cinema City
- Website: westend.hu

The Westend Shopping Center is a shopping centre built by Hungarian TriGránit located next to the Western Railway Station, in Budapest, Hungary. Opened in November 1999, it is known for having been the largest mall in Central Europe until larger ones were inaugurated, including Arena Plaza, also in Pest.

== Facts ==
- Client: TriGránit Development Corporation
- Site area: 540,000 square feet (50,000 m^{2})
- Total building area: 2,000,000 square feet (186,000 m^{2})
- Layout:
  - 535,000 square feet (49,700 m^{2}) retail entertainment
  - 225,000 square feet (20,900 m^{2}) offices
  - 170,000 square feet (15,800 m^{2}) Crowne Plaza Budapest, an IHG Hotel
  - 240,000 square feet (22,300 m^{2}) open space – rooftop garden/park
- Special features: accessible by subway, train, bus and tram
- Awards: 2001 First in Retail, Prix d’Excellence, International Real Estate Federation, Paris
