= West Coast (OneRepublic song) =

Single by OneRepublic

from the album Artificial Paradise
- Written: 2015
- Released: February 25, 2022
- Genre: Alternative pop; electropop
- Length: 3:12
- Label: Mosley; Interscope
- Composers: Ryan Tedder; Brent Kutzle; Noel Zancanella; Justin Tranter; Robin Fredriksson; Mattias Larsson
- Lyricist: Ryan Tedder
- Producers: Ryan Tedder; Brent Kutzle; Noel Zancanella; Mattman & Robin; John Nathaniel

OneRepublic singles chronology
"Sunshine" (2021)	"West Coast" (2022)	"You Were Loved" (2022)

Music video
- "West Coast" on YouTube

"West Coast" is a song by American pop rock band OneRepublic, released as a single on February 25, 2022, through Mosley Music Group and Interscope Records. The song was written by band's lead singer Ryan Tedder, who composed and produced it with bandmate Brent Kutzle, Noel Zancanella, Justin Tranter, and producing duo Mattman & Robin. A fan favorite since a demo snippet was shared publicly, "West Coast" was originally intended for the band's fourth and later fifth studio albums, Oh My My (2016) and Human (2021), but it was postponed due to the band's ambitions to meet expectations. It was later included as the main inspiration and second single from the band's sixth studio album Artificial Paradise (2024).

Inspired by the sunshine pop aesthetic of the Beach Boys and the Mamas & the Papas, "West Coast" is an alternative pop and electropop tribute to 1960s California, with lyrics about embracing a newfound sense of freedom and seeking "the Californian dream". The song received critical acclaim from music critics, who praised Tedder's vocals, production values, lyrics, and deemed it a perfect addition to the summer season.

An accompanying music video for the song, directed by Thomas Whitmore, premiered on February 25 as well. It features Tedder cruising up the coast in a Cadillac convertible as he plans a space-themed dance party. The video was also used to promote tourism in collaboration with Visit California, as well as the new generation of Microsoft Surface devices. OneRepublic performed the song on television shows, and it was part of the setlist for the band's Never Ending Summer Tour (2022).

== Background ==
In 2015, while OneRepublic was undertaking their Native Tour and recording for their fourth album, Oh My My (2016), the band shared a short snippet of one of the project's future songs, called "West Coast". During the same period, the band's lead singer and singer-songwriter Ryan Tedder was working with U2 on their 2017 album, Songs of Experience, and at one of the recording sessions, Tedder played "West Coast" to U2, who used a melody line and the first phrase of the chorus to create the single "Summer of Love".

Tedder later reworked the song for OneRepublic's fifth studio album, Human, saying in 2020 that the track "it's like [The Mamas and the Papas] – California Dreamin' and [The Beach Boys], but with drums that are like [Gorillaz]. It's the craziest, coolest about-face 'here comes the summer'". The song ended up being dropped from Human after the album was postponed due to the effects of the COVID-19 pandemic. Talking about that, Tedder said that "The reason it hasn’t come out yet is because it’s such a unique sound, it's so different than all the normal OneRepublic stuff… we decided to make a whole album that made sense for “West Coast” and that's the album that we’ve been working on for the last four months... "West Coast" is one of the key singles on that album and the sound of that album we’re slightly switching up to match with “West Coast,” because we think the song is so good". That album would be revealed to be Artificial Paradise released on July 12, 2024.

== Lyrics and composition ==
"West Coast" is an alternative pop and electropop song, with influences of from the sound of bands the Beach Boys, the Mamas & the Papas and Gorillaz. OneRepublic's lead singer Ryan Tedder wrote the lyrics to "West Coast" in 2015. He later produced it and composed the song's melody with bandmate bassist/cellist Brent Kutzle, Noel Zancanella, Justin Tranter, producing duo Mattman & Robin (Robin Fredriksson and Mattias Larsson) and John Nathaniel.

== Release and promotion ==
The song was officially released for digital download and streaming on February 25, 2022. Universal Music Group sent "West Coast" to Italian radio stations on March 18, 2022. The song was also released for digital download on OneRepublic's website the same day. Mosley Music Group and Interscope Records released it to the US hot adult contemporary radio on April 11. In collaboration with Visit California, OneRepublic used "West Coast" to promote tourism in California.

== Critical reception ==
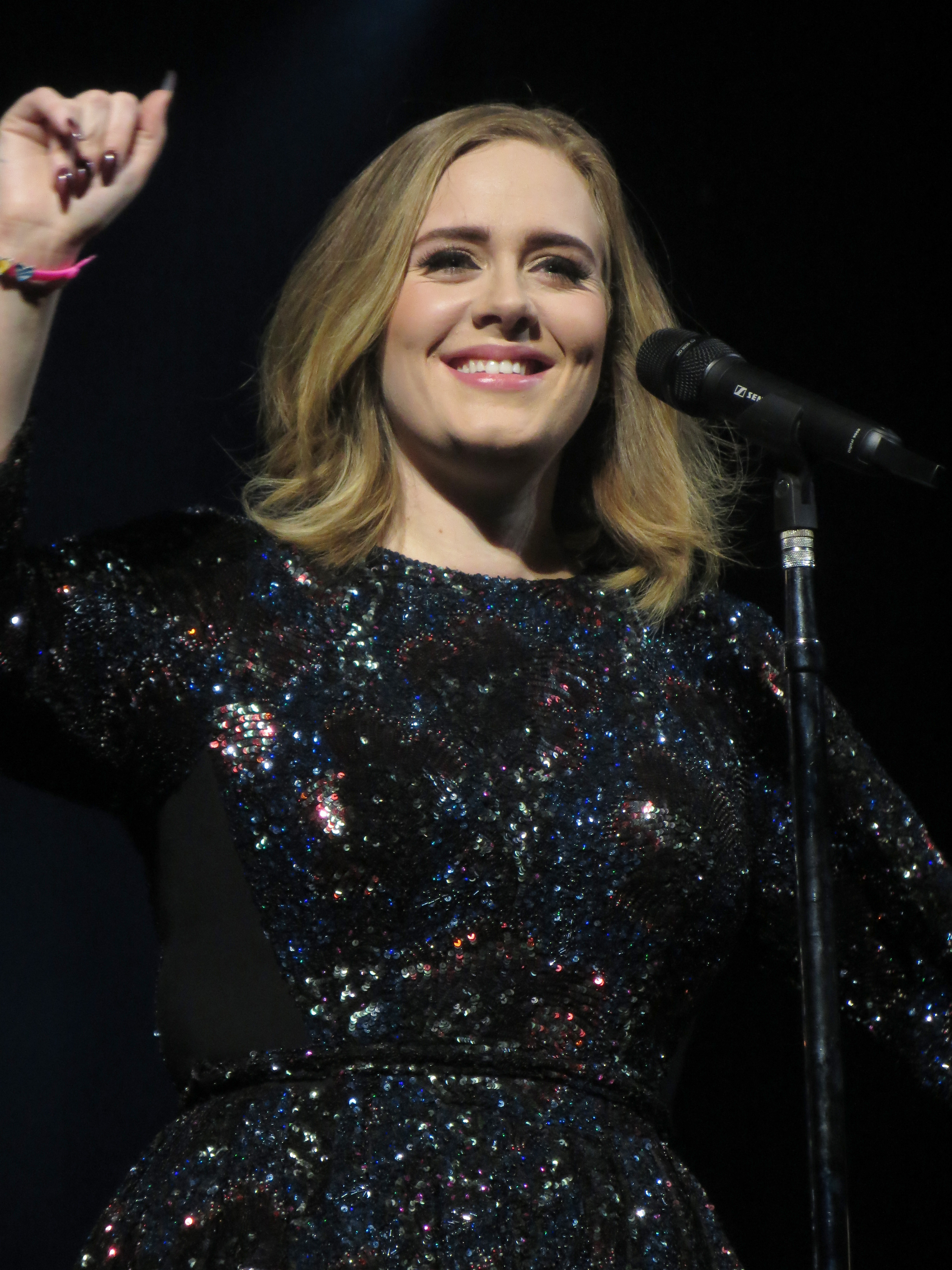
Critics praised Tedder's vocal performance, comparing it to Adele's "Skyfall".

"West Coast" received widespread acclaim from music critics for the song's production and Tedder's vocals. Joshua Andre of 365 Days of Inspiring Media gave 4.5 of 5 stars and wrote that song's melody is "a lot of heart, soul, inspiration, and purpose", also praising the lyrics and production, saying "we have that summery, breezy, pop atmosphere- a likeable song that speaks about being wild and free, and also speaks about having a good time". Kristin Smith of Plugged In compared "West Coast" melody with Adele's 2013 single "Skyfall", "except with a much faster beat and nowhere near as depressing", also pointing Tedder's songwriting, "this song is all about running from the blues that comes from a breakup, while also fleeing the winter blahs to find much warmer days–both figuratively and literally".

Emily Harris of Global Music Group wrote that Tedder's vocals in bridge have similarities with "Skyfall", adding "'West Coast' is brimming with confidence. Additionally, OneRepublic don't hold back with their high quality oozing out of every facet of their production. Also, while the band’s typical pop sound is audible in the mix, each member of the group manages to bring fresh new components to the forefront; including a string section in the prelude and a soulful groove that emerges as the track goes". Il Post appreciated the inspiration from the 1960s music scene in the song, writing that the band managed to capture "the summer and dreamy atmospheres".

== Live performances ==
The band performed "West Coast" for the first time during The Today Show on March 4, 2022. On March 8, OneRepublic performed it on The Late Late Show with James Corden. The band performed the song for the third time on Good Morning America (GMA) held on July 15, 2022, at Times Square Studios in Manhattan. The song was also a regular part of band setlist for the Never Ending Summer Tour.

== Personnel ==
- Ryan Tedder – lead vocals, songwriter, composer, producer
- Brent Kutzle – songwriter, composer, producer
- Noel Zancanella – composer, producer, additional producer
- Robin Fredriksson – composer, producer
- Mattias Larsson – composer, producer
- Justin Tranter – composer
- John Nathaniel – producer, background vocals
- David Davidson – violin
- David Angel – violin
- Seanad Chang – viola
- Paul Nelson – cello
- Craig Nelson – upright bass
- Emoni Wilkins – background vocals
- Wil Merrell – background vocals
- Devonne Folkwes – background vocals
- Doug Sarrett – engineer
- Bryce Bordone – mix engineer
- Serban Ghenea – mixer

== Charts ==
Chart performance for "West Coast"
Chart (2022)	Peak position
New Zealand Hot Singles (RMNZ)	6
San Marino (SMRRTV Top 50)	13
Switzerland (Schweizer Hitparade)	65
US Digital Song Sales (Billboard)	36
US Adult Pop Airplay (Billboard)	18

== Certifications ==
Certifications for "West Coast"
Region	Certification	Certified units/sales
Austria (IFPI Austria)	Gold	15,000^{‡}
Canada (Music Canada)	Gold	40,000^{‡}
Italy (FIMI)	Gold	50,000^{‡}
New Zealand (RMNZ)	Gold	15,000^{‡}
Switzerland (IFPI Switzerland)	Gold	10,000^{‡}
United States (RIAA)	Gold	500,000^{‡}
^{‡} Sales+streaming figures based on certification alone.

== Release history ==
Release dates and formats for "West Coast"
Region	Date	Format(s)	Label(s)	Ref.
Various	February 25, 2022	Digital download; streaming	Mosley; Interscope	
Italy	March 18, 2022	Radio airplay	Universal	
United States	April 11, 2022	Hot adult contemporary radio	Mosley; Interscope	
