= Szilárd Zielinski =

Hungarian architect (1860–1924)

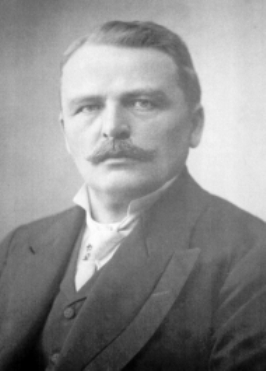
- Szilárd Zielinski (1910s)
- Born: May 1, 1860; Mátészalka, Austro-Hungary
- Died: April 24, 1924 (aged 63); Budapest, Hungary
- Education: Budapest University of Technology and Economics
- Spouse: Irma Rózá Halász (m. 1894)
- Awards: Hungarian Heritage Award

Dr. Szilárd Zielinkski (May 1, 1860 – April 24, 1924) was a Hungarian engineer, architect, author, and doctor, responsible for the creation of the first reinforced concrete railway bridge in Hungary. For his contributions, he was posthumously awarded the Hungarian Heritage Award in 2004.

== Biography ==
Zielinkski was born in 1860 in Mátészalka, Austro-Hungary to Stanislaus Zieliński and Böhm Terézia, both were Polish political refugees. He attended Toldy Ferenc High School in Budapest and later attended Budapest University of Technology and Economics and studied architecture in Germany, England and France until 1888, when he got his doctorate in architecture and worked for the Eiffel company in Paris. In 1889, he opened an engineering office in Budapest and primarily dealt with bridge design and railway marking. At that time, he mainly used iron structures. From 1897 he was a teacher at his alma mater. On December 1, 1894, Zielinkski married Irma Rózá Halász at the Kálvin tér Reformed Church in Budapest and the couple never had any children.

After learning about the patent for reinforced concrete construction by French engineer François Hennebique, he was the first in the country to advocate the use of reinforced concrete structures in his engineering work. Initially, he worked based on French designs and using French workers, but soon after, he became independent with his own designs and the help of workers from Szeged.

In addition to his engineering work, he fought for many years for the establishment of the Chamber of Engineers. He submitted his first proposal in 1900 , but he had to wait until 1923 for the Chamber of Engineers to be established, and soon after, the Budapest Chamber of Engineers. He became the first president of the latter from its founding. However, Zielinkski later died on April 24, 1924, and for his services, he was awarded with the Hungarian Heritage Award in 2004.

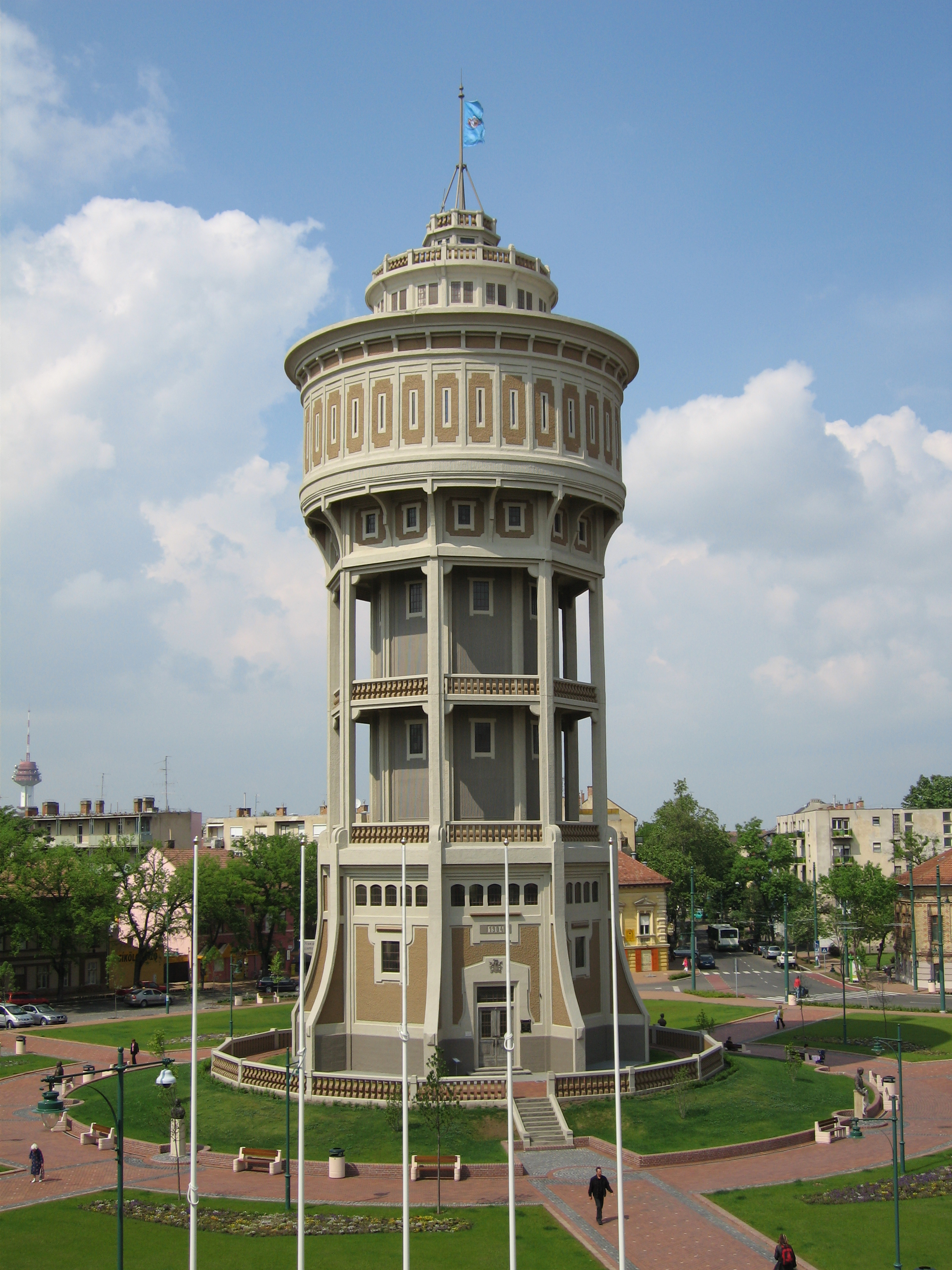
Szeged water tower (2007), built based on Zielinkski's design

== Engineering works ==
- Zielinski Bridge, Budapest, City Park, (iron structure, 1895–1896)
- Árpád Bridge in Ráckeve (1897), bombed during World War II)
- Nišava Bridge, Niš, Serbia (1901)
- The first reinforced concrete railway bridge in Hungary, built over the Debrecen–Szatmárnémeti–Máramarossziget railway main line (1903)
- Lajos Bertalan Monument, Szeged (1903)
- Kőbánya Water Tower (1903)
- Szeged water tower, (1903–1904)
- Ohat-pusztakócs granary (1905)
- Bökényi Dam (The first reinforced concrete hydraulic structure in Hungary. Hármas-Körös, Csongrád County, 1905–1907)
- Siófok Casino (made of reinforced concrete 1909)
- Margaret Island Water Tower (1909–1911)
- Reinforced concrete structure of the Ungár–Mayer Palace , Szeged (1910–1911)
- Svábhegy Water Tower or Eötvös Street Water Tower (1913)
- Former Crane and Engine Workshop of Ganz-MÁVAG's Pest, G Site (1904–1905)
- The ceiling, balcony and roof structures of the Budapest Academy of Music were designed by Zsigmond Jemnitz as head of Zielinski's office, and Flóris Korb and Kálmán Giergl as structural design engineers (1904–1907)
- Balatonföldvár , boat harbor, western pier footbridge (reinforced concrete, 1905)
- Warehouse buildings of some ACSEV railway stations
- Hosszúvölgyi Viaduct (reinforced concrete, 1907)
- Timiș Bridge, (1906–1908)
- Port elevator, (made of reinforced concrete 1910)
- Csanád Railway Bridge over the Mureș River and Csanád Road Bridge over the Mureș River
- Kustány, Zala Bridge (1912)
- Letenye, Mura floodplain bridge (1912)
- Andráshida, Zala Bridge, (1914)
- Plans for the reconstruction of the Széchenyi Chain Bridge (1912–1916)

== His writings ==
- Method of calculating track connections. Budapest, 1888 (Book from the M. Mérnök- és Ép.-E. Gazette)
- Proposal for a method for removing navigational obstacles on the lower Danube between Old Moldova and Turn-Severin. Budapest, 1890 (Book from the M. Mérnök- és Ép.-E. Közlöny)
- Questions and proposals regarding the amendment and supplementation of the laws on local railways (together with György Bene and Garibaldi Pulszky) Budapest, 1899 (Book from the Weekly Bulletin)
- Comparative examination of Romanian cements and verification of their use in practice (together with József Zhuk) Budapest, 1901
- The regulation of traffic conditions in Budapest and the plan of the central main railway. Budapest, 1902
- The solidification of Romanian and Portland cements in paste, mortar and concrete. Budapest, 1909
