= Runaway (OneRepublic song) =

2023 song by OneRepublic

Single by OneRepublic

from the album Artificial Paradise
- Released: May 26, 2023
- Genre: Pop; pop rock
- Length: 2:23
- Label: Mosley; Interscope
- Songwriters: Ryan Tedder; Brent Kutzle; Ben Samama; Johnny Simpson; Nolan Sipe; Josh Varnadore
- Producers: Loren Ferard; Kutzle; John Nathaniel; Samama

OneRepublic singles chronology
"I Ain't Worried" (2022)	"Runaway" (2023)	"Mirage" (2023)

Music video
- "Runaway" on YouTube

"Runaway" is a song by American pop band OneRepublic, released a single through Mosley and Interscope Records on May 26, 2023. An acoustic version of the song was released on August 18, 2023. It is included as the fourth single from the band's sixth studio album Artificial Paradise.

== Background and composition ==
"Runaway" was written by band members Ryan Tedder and Brent Kutzle as well as Ben Samama, Johnny Simpson, Nolan Sipe, and Josh Varnadore. It was also produced by Kutzle, Samama, Loren Ferard, and John Nathaniel. The lyrics of the song describe letting go of fears and struggles to enjoy and lose yourself in new things and experiences. In the days prior of its release, the band posted teasers on social media to promote the song. A common misconception is that the track features a sample from Daft Punk's Doin' It Right. In actuality, Runaway features an interpolation of the Daft Punk song.

== Music video ==
A music video for "Runaway" premiered on May 26, 2023, and was directed by Tomás Whitmore. The video features the band members relaxing, recording, and performing in various Asian cities like Manila, Hong Kong, Jakarta, Singapore, Kuala Lumpur, Bangkok, Taipei, and Tokyo. A performance video was recorded and performed atop the Marina Bay Sands in Singapore and released July 20. The music video for the acoustic version of the song was released August 23 and features similar clips as the original.

== Track listing ==
- Digital download
1. "Runaway" – 2:23
- Digital download – Acoustic
1. "Runaway" (Acoustic) – 2:22

== Personnel ==
Musicians

- Ryan Tedder – lead vocals
- Zach Filkins – lead guitar
- Drew Brown – rhythm guitar
- Brent Kutzle – bass guitar, programming
- Eddie Fisher – drums, percussion
- Brian Willett – keyboards

Additional musicians

- Joe Henderson – percussion
- John Nathaniel – backing vocals, programming
- Ben Samama – backing vocals
- Will Vaughan – guitar

Production

- Loren Ferard – production
- Henderson – engineering
- Kutzle – production
- Nathaniel – production, mixing, engineering
- Samama – production
- Thomas Wolseley – engineering

== Charts ==
=== Weekly charts ===
Weekly chart performance for "Runaway"
Chart (2023)	Peak position
Belgium (Ultratop 50 Flanders)	9
Belgium (Ultratop 50 Wallonia)	9
Canada CHR/Top 40 (Billboard)	43
Canada Hot AC (Billboard)	21
Estonia Airplay (TopHit)	9
France (SNEP)	57
Hungary (Rádiós Top 40)	34
Netherlands (Single Top 100)	26
Netherlands (Dutch Top 40)	6
New Zealand Hot Singles (RMNZ)	6
San Marino (SMRRTV Top 50)	3
US Adult Contemporary (Billboard)	26
US Adult Pop Airplay (Billboard)	8
US Pop Airplay (Billboard)	29

=== Monthly charts ===
Monthly chart performance for "Runaway"
Chart (2023)	Peak position
Estonia Airplay (TopHit)	14

=== Year-end charts ===
Year-end chart performance for "Runaway"
Chart (2023)	Position
Estonia Airplay (TopHit)	35

Year-end chart performance for "Runaway"
Chart (2024)	Position
Belgium (Ultratop 50 Flanders)	84
Estonia Airplay (TopHit)	141

== Certifications ==
Certifications for "Runaway"
Region	Certification	Certified units/sales
Belgium (BRMA)	Gold	20,000^{‡}
Brazil (Pro-Música Brasil)	Gold	20,000^{‡}
France (SNEP)	Platinum	200,000^{‡}
Poland (ZPAV)	Gold	25,000^{‡}
^{‡} Sales+streaming figures based on certification alone.
