= Nobody (OneRepublic song) =

Single by OneRepublic

from the album Artificial Paradise (Deluxe)
- Released: April 12, 2024
- Genre: Pop rock
- Length: 2:33
- Label: Mosley; Interscope
- Songwriters: Ryan Tedder; Brent Kutzle; Joe Henderson; Tyler Spry; Josh Varnadore
- Producers: Henderson; Kutzle; John Nathaniel; Spry

OneRepublic singles chronology
"I Don't Wanna Wait" (2024)	"Nobody" (2024)	"Fire" (2024)

Music video
- "Nobody" on YouTube

"Nobody" is a song by American pop rock band OneRepublic. It was released on April 12, 2024, as the ending theme for the anime Kaiju No. 8. It is included on the deluxe edition of the band's sixth studio album, Artificial Paradise.

== Background and composition ==
"Nobody" was written by band members Brent Kutzle and Ryan Tedder as well as Joe Henderson, Tyler Spry, and Josh Varnadore. It was produced by Henderson, Kutzle, Spry, as well as John Nathaniel. In a comment on the anime's website, Tedder explained the background of the song:

Around the spring of 2023, I had a meeting with the Kaiju No. 8 team, where they showed me some of the footage and storyboards, and from there I analyzed the work and characters and thought about what kind of sound was needed. I wanted the song to convey a sense of exuberance, fun, and shining moments, and since I was in Japan on business in November 2023, I wrote the lyrics while I was there. This song was inspired by Japan to the greatest extent possible.

— Ryan Tedder

== Music video ==
The music video for "Nobody" premiered on June 29, 2024. The video shows the band performing the song in a small Karaoke room with clips of Japanese cities and culture intermittent overlaid with visual effects that emulate manga or comic book textures and styles.

== Accolades ==
Awards and nominations for "Nobody"
Ceremony	Year	Award	Result	Ref.
Crunchyroll Anime Awards	2025	Best Ending Sequence	Nominated	
Japan Expo Awards	2025	Daruma for Best Ending	Won	
Japan Gold Disc Award	2025	Song of the Year by Download (Western)	Won	
Music Awards Japan	2025	Best of Listeners' Choice: International Song	Nominated	

== Personnel ==
Credits for "Nobody" adapted from AllMusic.

Musicians

- Brent Kutzle – composer, backing vocals
- Joe Henderson – composer, backing vocals
- Josh Varnadore – composer, backing vocals
- Ryan Tedder – composer, lead vocals
- Tyler Spry – composer, backing vocals
- Alisa Xayalith - backing vocals

Production

- Kutzle – producer
- Henderson – producer
- John Nathaniel – producer
- Spry – producer

== Charts ==
Chart performance for "Nobody"
Chart (2024)	Peak position
Belgium (Ultratop 50 Wallonia)	36
Japan (Japan Hot 100)	80
Japan Hot Animation (Billboard Japan)	18
Japan Digital Singles (Oricon)	20
New Zealand Hot Singles (RMNZ)	27

== Certifications ==
Certifications for "Nobody"
Region	Certification	Certified units/sales
Brazil (Pro-Música Brasil)	Gold	20,000^{‡}
^{‡} Sales+streaming figures based on certification alone.
