= Artificial Paradise (OneRepublic album) =

2024 studio album by OneRepublic

Studio album by OneRepublic
- Released: July 12, 2024
- Genre: Pop
- Length: 38:25
- Labels: Mosley; Interscope
- Producer: OneRepublic

OneRepublic studio album chronology
Human (2021)	Artificial Paradise (2024)

Singles from Artificial Paradise
- 1. "Sunshine" Released: November 10, 2021; 2. "West Coast" Released: February 25, 2022; 3. "I Ain't Worried" Released: May 13, 2022; 4. "Runaway" Released: May 26, 2023; 5. "Mirage" Released: September 22, 2023; 6. "I Don't Wanna Wait" Released: April 5, 2024; 7. "Nobody" Released: April 12, 2024; 8. "Fire" Released: May 10, 2024; 9. "Hurt" Released: July 5, 2024; 10. "Sink or Swim" Released: August 29, 2024

Artificial Paradise is the sixth studio album by American pop rock band OneRepublic, released on July 12, 2024, through Mosley Music Group and Interscope Records.

It follows their fifth studio album, Human (2021), and includes the singles "Sunshine", "West Coast", "I Ain't Worried", "Runaway", "Mirage" with Mishaal Tamer, "I Don't Wanna Wait" with David Guetta, "Nobody" (from Kaiju No .8), and "Fire (Official UEFA Euro 2024 Song)" with Meduza and Leony. The latter three were only included on the deluxe digital edition of the album. "Hurt" was the first single released following the album's announcement, with "Sink or Swim" following as the final and tenth overall single.

The album was the last of the band's contract and final release with Interscope before signing with BMG in July 2025. The super deluxe edition of the album was released on December 6, 2024, including acoustic versions of some of the tracks.

== Background and composition ==
In a social media post announcing Artificial Paradise, lead singer Ryan Tedder explained that the album began with their single "West Coast", which was written in 2016 in a New Orleans hotel room, and followed by further standalone singles in the subsequent eight years that the band felt "didn't quite make sense together" but were kept as more songs were written and recorded "in different hotel rooms and studios dotted around the world". Tedder said the rest of the album was then completed "in the last couple years" as they "navigated a world, full of artificial stories and constructs". He described the album title as "all too resonant with the world we currently live in, and the aspiration of so many people, for better or worse". The announcement was accompanied by a clip of the album's title track.

The tracklist for the digital version of the album was changed by Tedder two weeks before its release because it didn't "flow" and would not "feel new" for fans of the band. The digital tracklist is arranged in that all new songs, except "I Ain't Worried", would be at the front of the album while all the previously released standalone singles would be at the back. The physical editions of the album reflect the original tracklist.

== Singles ==
Eight singles released from 2021 to 2024 are included on the album: "Sunshine", "West Coast", "I Ain't Worried" (from Top Gun: Maverick), "Runaway", "Mirage" with Mishaal Tamer (from Assassin's Creed Mirage), "I Don't Wanna Wait" with David Guetta, "Nobody" (from Kaiju No .8), and "Fire (Official UEFA Euro 2024 Song)" with Meduza and Leony. The latter three were only included on the deluxe edition of the album. "Hurt" followed as the ninth single on July 5, 2024, making it the first to be released after the album's announcement. A remix of the song with Jelly Roll was released on November 22. "Sink or Swim" was released as the tenth single on August 29 alongside a music video.

== Critical reception ==
Professional ratings
Review scores
Source	Rating
AllMusic	3.5/5 stars
The Independent	7/10

Carla Feric of The Independent wrote that the album has a "selection of catchy anthems" and "lively, light and summery tracks", and felt that OneRepublic "have created a musically progressive blend which is easy-listening, and has enough tracks for anyone to find at least one song they'll enjoy". Writing for Grammy.com, Taylor Weatherby called it "a seamless blend of songs that will resonate with longtime and newer fans alike. From the layered production of 'Hurt,' to the feel-good vibes of 'Serotonin,' to the evocative lyrics of 'Last Holiday,' Artificial Paradise shows that OneRepublic's sound is as dialed-in as it is ever-evolving." Neil Z. Yeung of AllMusic concluded that "Tedder knows what he's doing and, like contemporary output by Imagine Dragons and Coldplay, can pump out crowd-pleasing optimism as if he was on autopilot...for better or worse."

== Track listing ==
Standard digital edition track listing
No.	Title	Writer(s)	Producer(s)	Length
1.	"Artificial Paradise"	John Nathaniel; Josh Varnadore	Nathaniel; Joe Henderson^{[v]}	1:38
2.	"Hurt"	Ryan Tedder; Tyler Spry	Tedder; Spry^{[p]}; Henderson^{[v]}	2:41
3.	"Sink or Swim"	Tedder; Brent Kutzle; Nathaniel; Simon Oscroft; Varnadore	Kutzle; Nathaniel; Oscroft	2:34
4.	"Last Holiday"	Tedder; Kutzle; Noel Zancanella	Kutzle; Zancanella^{[a]}; Henderson^{[v]}	3:16
5.	"I Ain't Worried"	Tedder; Kutzle; John Eriksson; Peter Morén; Spry; Björn Yttling	Tedder; Kutzle; Oscroft; Spry; Nathaniel^{[c]}	2:28
6.	"Red Light Green Light"	Tedder; Kutzle; Nathaniel	Kutzle; Nathaniel	2:15
7.	"Serotonin"	Tedder; Kutzle; Spry; Varndore	Spry^{[p]}; Henderson^{[v]}	3:28
8.	"Singapore"	Nathaniel; Brian Willett	Nathaniel; Willett	3:28
9.	"Room for You"	Tedder; Kutzle; Spry; Zancanella	Kutzle; Spry; Henderson^{[v]}	2:47
10.	"Stargazing"	Tedder; Brandyn Burnette; Henderson; Kutzle; Chase Stockman	Kutzle; Stockman; Eddie Fisher; Henderson	2:40
11.	"Entr'acte"	Brandon Collins	Kutzle; Collins	1:12
12.	"West Coast"	Tedder; Kutzle; Robin Fredriksson; Mattias Larsson; Justin Tranter; Zancanella	Tedder; Kutzle; Mattman & Robin; Nathaniel; Zancanella^{[a]}	3:14
13.	"Runaway"	Tedder; Thomas Bangalter; Guy-Manuel de Homem-Christo; Kutzle; Noah Lennox; Ben Samama; Johnny Simpson; Nolan Sipe; Varnadore	Kutzle; Nathaniel; Samama	2:25
14.	"Sunshine"	Tedder; Kutzle; Zach Skelton; Casey Smith; Spry; Zancanella	Tedder; Kutzle; Oscroft; Spry; Henderson^{[v]}	2:43
15.	"Mirage" (for Assassin's Creed Mirage; with Mishaal Tamer)	Tedder; Mishaal Tamer; Brendan Angelides; Grant Boutin; Will Jay; Coleton Rubin	Boutin; Tedder	2:13
Total length:				38:25

Deluxe digital edition bonus tracks
No.	Title	Writer(s)	Producer(s)	Length
16.	"Nobody" (from Kaiju No. 8)	Tedder; Kutzle; Henderson; Spry; Varnadore	Kutzle; Henderson; Nathaniel; Spry	2:33
17.	"I Don't Wanna Wait" (with David Guetta)	David Guetta; Tedder; Kutzle; Jakke Erixson; Gregory Hein; Michael Pollack; Timofey Reznikov; Spry; Josh Varnadore	Guetta; Kutzle; Erixson; Reznikov; Spry	2:29
18.	"Fire (Official UEFA Euro 2024 Song)" (with Meduza and Leony)	Luca de Gregorio; Mattia Vitale; Simone Giani; Tedder; Kutzle; Leonie Burger; Spry; Varnadore; Vitali Zestovskih	Meduza	2:48
Total length:				46:15

Super deluxe edition track listing
No.	Title	Writer(s)	Producer(s)	Length
19.	"Hurt" (with Jelly Roll)			2:37
20.	"I Don't Wanna Wait" (acoustic; with David Guetta)			2:32
21.	"Sink or Swim" (acoustic)			2:37
22.	"Nobody" (from Kaiju No. 8; acoustic)			2:33
23.	"Stargazing" (acoustic)			2:39
24.	"Runaway" (acoustic)			2:24
25.	"You Were Loved" (acoustic; with Gryffin)	Daniel Griffith; Tedder; Kutzle	Gryffin; Tedder; Kutzle	3:36
26.	"I Ain't Worried" (acoustic)			2:30
27.	"Sunshine" (acoustic)			2:53
28.	"West Coast" (acoustic)			3:28
Total length:				74:04

Standard physical edition track listing
No.	Title	Writer(s)	Producer(s)	Length
1.	"Artificial Paradise"			1:38
2.	"Hurt"			2:41
3.	"Sink or Swim"			2:34
4.	"Mirage" (for Assassin's Creed Mirage; with Mishaal Tamer)	Ryan Tedder; Mishaal Tamer; Brendan Angelides; Grant Boutin; Will Jay; Coleton Rubin	Boutin; Tedder	2:13
5.	"Sunshine"	Tedder; Kutzle; Zach Skelton; Casey Smith; Spry	Tedder; Kutzle; Oscroft; Spry	2:43
6.	"I Don't Wanna Wait" (with David Guetta)	David Guetta; Tedder; Kutzle; Jakke Erixson; Gregory Hein; Michael Pollack; Timofey Reznikov; Spry; Josh Varnadore	Guetta; Kutzle; Erixson; Reznikov; Spry	2:29
7.	"I Ain't Worried"	Tedder; Brent Kutzle; John Eriksson; Peter Morén; Tyler Spry; Björn Yttling	Tedder; Kutzle; Simon Oscroft; John Nathaniel; Spry	2:28
8.	"Entr'acte"			1:12
9.	"West Coast"	Tedder; Kutzle; Robin Fredriksson; Mattias Larsson; Justin Tranter; Noel Zancanella	Tedder; Kutzle; Mattman & Robin; Nathaniel; Zancanella	3:14
10.	"Nobody" (from Kaiju No. 8)	Tedder; Kutzle; Joe Henderson; Spry; Varnadore	Kutzle; Henderson; Nathaniel; Spry	2:33
11.	"Serotonin"			3:28
12.	"Red Light Green Light"			2:15
13.	"Runaway"	Tedder; Kutzle; Ben Samama; Johnny Simpson; Nolan Sipe; Varnadore	Kutzle; Loren Ferard; Nathaniel; Samama	2:25
14.	"Last Holiday"			3:16
15.	"Singapore"			3:28
Total length:				38:37

Target physical edition and Japanese bonus tracks
No.	Title	Writer(s)	Producer(s)	Length
16.	"Stargazing"	Tedder; Brandyn Burnette; Henderson; Kutzle; Chase Stockman	Kutzle; Stockman; Eddie Fisher; Henderson	2:40
17.	"Room for You"	Tedder; Kutzle; Spry; Zancanella	Kutzle; Spry; Henderson^{[v]}	2:47
18.	"Fire (Official UEFA Euro 2024 Song)" (with Meduza and Leony)	Luca de Gregorio; Mattia Vitale; Simone Giani; Tedder; Kutzle; Leonie Burger; Spry; Varnadore; Vitali Zestovskih	Meduza	2:48
Total length:				46:15

Notes

- ^{^[p]} signifies a primary producer
- ^{^[c]} signifies a co-producer
- ^{^[a]} signifies an additional producer
- ^{^[v]} signifies a vocal producer

== Personnel ==
OneRepublic

- Ryan Tedder – lead vocals
- Zach Filkins – guitar
- Drew Brown – guitar
- Eddie Fisher – drums
- Brent Kutzle – bass guitar; background vocals (tracks 9, 15), programming (9)
- Brian Willett – keyboards

Additional musicians

- John Nathaniel – programming (tracks 1, 3, 6, 13, 16), background vocals (3, 4, 6, 8–10, 13, 16), guitar (3), theremin (6), additional vocals (12)
- Jelly Roll – vocals (track 1)
- Tyler Spry – guitar (tracks 2, 5–7, 9, 14), background vocals (2, 9, 16), additional keyboards (7, 9), bass (7), programming (9)
- Loren Ferard – guitar (tracks 2, 7, 14), programming (2, 7), acoustic guitar (9)
- Alisa Xayalith – background vocals (track 2)
- Simon Oscroft – guitar (tracks 5, 14)
- Brandon Collins – programming (track 5), strings (11)
- Harry Charles – additional keyboards, programming (track 7)
- Joe Henderson – background vocals (tracks 10, 16), percussion (13)
- Brandyn Burnette – background vocals (track 10)
- Chase Stockman – background vocals (track 10)
- Devonne Fowlkes – additional vocals (track 12)
- Emoni Wilkins – additional vocals (track 12)
- Wil Merrell – additional vocals (track 12)
- Paul Nelson – cello (track 12)
- Craig Nelson – upright bass (track 12)
- Seanad Chang – viola (track 12)
- David Angell – violin (track 12)
- David Davidson – violin (track 12)
- Ben Samama – background vocals (track 13)
- Will Vaughan – guitar (track 13)
- Josh Varnadore – background vocals (track 16)
- Luca De Gregorio – drum programming, keyboards, percussion, synthesizer (track 18)
- Mattia Vitalie – drum programming, keyboards, percussion, synthesizer (track 18)
- Simone Giani – drum programming, keyboards, percussion, synthesizer (track 18)
- Leony – vocals (track 18)

Design

- Brody Harper – creative direction
- Douglas Hale – original collage art
- Kristin Weidemann – design and layout
- Jeremy Cowart – band photography
- Ryan Slaughter and Taylor Lowe (for TwoSevenTwo) – album art animation

== Charts ==
=== Weekly charts ===
Weekly chart performance for Artificial Paradise
Chart (2024)	Peak position
Australian Albums (ARIA)	61
Austrian Albums (Ö3 Austria)	8
Belgian Albums (Ultratop Flanders)	80
Belgian Albums (Ultratop Wallonia)	127
Canadian Albums (Billboard)	24
French Albums (SNEP)	14
German Albums (Offizielle Top 100)	23
Irish Albums (IRMA)	90
Italian Albums (FIMI)	36
Japanese Albums (Oricon)	46
Japanese Digital Albums (Oricon)	19
Japanese Hot Albums (Billboard Japan)	40
Lithuanian Albums (AGATA)	54
New Zealand Albums (RMNZ)	25
Polish Albums (ZPAV)	35
Portuguese Albums (AFP)	77
Scottish Albums (Official Charts)	15
Spanish Albums (Promusicae)	38
Swiss Albums (Schweizer Hitparade)	8
UK Albums (Official Charts)	46
US Billboard 200	50

=== Year-end charts ===
Year-end chart performance for Artificial Paradise
Chart (2024)	Position
French Albums (SNEP)	186

== Certifications ==
Certifications for Artificial Paradise
Region	Certification	Certified units/sales
Brazil (Pro-Música Brasil)	2× Platinum	80,000^{‡}
Canada (Music Canada)	2× Platinum	160,000^{‡}
Italy (FIMI)	Gold	25,000^{‡}
New Zealand (RMNZ)	Gold	7,500^{‡}
United Kingdom (BPI)	Silver	60,000^{‡}
United States (RIAA)	Gold	500,000^{‡}
^{‡} Sales+streaming figures based on certification alone.
