= I Ain't Worried =

Single by OneRepublic

from the album Top Gun: Maverick (Music from the Motion Picture) and Artificial Paradise
- Written: 2020
- Released: May 13, 2022
- Recorded: November 2021
- Studio: Kempinski (Budapest, Hungary)
- Length: 2:28
- Label: Mosley; Interscope
- Songwriters: Ryan Tedder; Brent Kutzle; Tyler Spry; John Eriksson; Peter Morén; Björn Yttling
- Producers: Tedder; Kutzle; Simon Oscroft; Spry

OneRepublic singles chronology
| "You Were Loved" (2022) | "I Ain't Worried" (2022) | "Runaway" (2023) |

Music video
- "I Ain't Worried" on YouTube

"I Ain't Worried" is a song by American pop rock band OneRepublic, released on May 13, 2022, through Mosley Music Group and Interscope Records. It is the second and final single to the soundtrack for the film Top Gun: Maverick (2022). It is included as the third single from the band's sixth studio album Artificial Paradise (2024). The song was co-written by band members Ryan Tedder and Brent Kutzle, alongside Tyler Spry; the members of Peter Bjorn and John are also credited as co-writers, since the song contains elements of their 2006 hit single "Young Folks". It was produced by Tedder, Kutzle, Simon Oscroft, and Spry, with co-production from John Nathaniel, and features background vocals from Tedder's son Copeland Tedder, who is the only other background voice apart from his father.

The track debuted on the UK Singles Chart on June 3 and on the Irish Singles Chart on June 10, climbing positions until it peaked in the UK top three and the Ireland top five. It became the band's biggest hit in the UK since "Love Runs Out" (2014). "I Ain't Worried" debuted at number 76 on the US Billboard Hot 100 and peaked at number 6, becoming their fourth top ten hit there. While on the Canadian Hot 100 the song debuted at number 41 and peaked at number 3. "I Ain't Worried" also peaked at number 1 in Belgium, Hungary, Iceland and New Zealand, and reached the top ten in other countries, including Australia, Austria, Brazil, Bulgaria, Czech Republic, France, Greece, Japan, Lebanon, Lithuania, Malaysia, Malta, Netherlands, Poland, Russia, Singapore, Slovakia, South Africa, South Korea, Switzerland and Taiwan.

Upon release, "I Ain't Worried" received highly positive reviews from music critics, being praised for its sunny production and upbeat melody.

== Background and music ==
In an interview with Ryan Seacrest on On Air with Ryan Seacrest, Tedder revealed that the idea for the song started during the beginning of the COVID-19 pandemic after one of his friends at Paramount Pictures invited him to participate in the soundtrack of the new Top Gun. At that time, Tom Cruise had turned down about 30 songs for the soundtrack, and was looking for a band to create an original song for the new film, specifically for the beach scene. Tedder said that "I Ain't Worried" was "written with the characters in mind relaxing and having fun in the scene for the first time in those two hours of film", making the song manage to make the scene memorable in its own way and at the same time fit in with the action and emotion scenes throughout the film. The band recorded the song during the 2021 MTV Europe Music Awards in November at the Kempinski Hotel Corvinus in Budapest, where they stayed during the song's release on May 13. The song also featured the band's frontman Ryan Tedder's son Copeland, who was credited as one of the backing vocals. Following the release of the lead single from the Top Gun: Maverick soundtrack "Hold My Hand" on May 3, "I Ain't Worried" was officially released as the second single on May 13 by Interscope Records and Mosley Music Group, the label on which the band is part. The song, along with its music video directed by Isaac Rentz, made its global debut on MTV Live and MTVU, as well as on the billboards of the Paramount Theater Manhattan on Times Square.

"I Ain't Worried" appears during the scene where Maverick and his students play football at a beach. Tedder felt that illustrating the song worked with the film was important, given the traditional Hollywood wisdom that "you can lose a song if it doesn’t play to picture." Given the film's secrecy, Tedder found this hard to convey: initially, they were not allowed a copy of the segment they were writing for. In a Zoom call, he was played footage from the scene, and decided to take matters into his own hands: he used his smartphone to record the scene from his computer screen, and then edited that sequence to the song himself with help from his co-writers. "We edited it, trying to guess what the film editor himself or herself would do," he explained to Variety. Cruise was thrilled with the results, and found Tedder's determination riotously funny, remarking, "Well, that's a first." Tedder estimated that most of his edit made it into the film unaltered.

== Critical reception ==
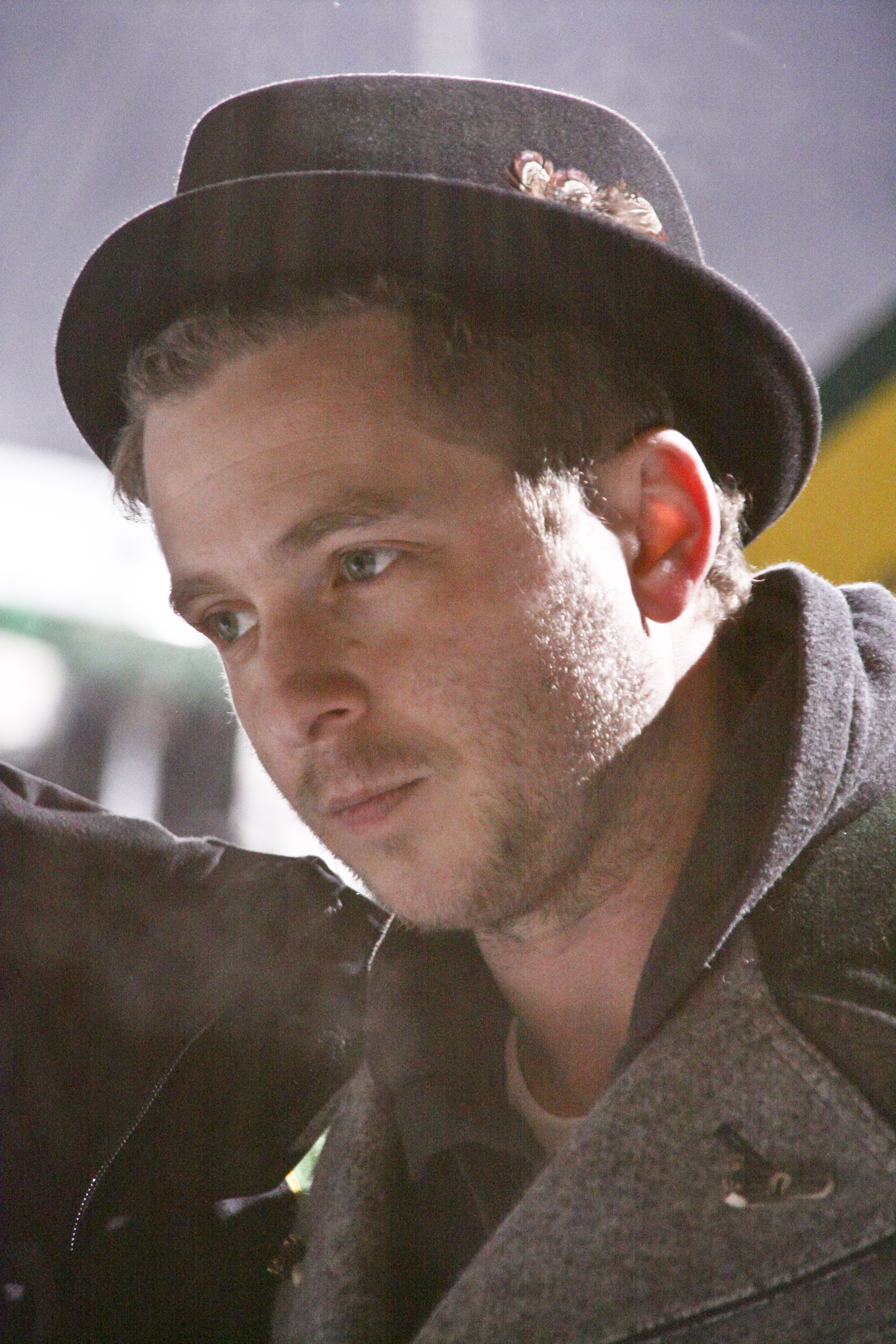
The band's frontman Ryan Tedder received praise for the lyrical content and production on the song.

Greta Brereton of NME praised Tedder's vocals on the song, also highlighting the song's fast-paced melody and upbeat pop production, in contrast to Lady Gaga's song for the soundtrack, "Hold My Hand". In a Billboard article, Hannah Dailey praised the song's lyrical content and laid-back style, citing that they "uniquely connect with the atmosphere of the movie scene in which the song makes its presence". Writing for The Charlotte Observer, Théoden James said the beat and vocals of song is a "super-infectious bubblegum" and a "pop perfection in general".

Tyler Golsen from Far Out Magazine wrote that "'I Ain’t Worried' doesn't have enough length or substance to be considered annoying. It's just a brief slice of pop music nothingness: sunny, breezy, light, and utterly forgettable", but praised the song's melody, saying "Granted, something scratches at the back of your ears when you put the song. Chalk that up to super technician Ryan Tedder, who can make a memorable melody out of just about anything".

== Music video ==
The accompanying music video was directed by Isaac Rentz, best known for directing the music videos of "She's Kinda Hot" by 5 Seconds of Summer and "Hey Hey Hey" by Katy Perry. The music video was released on May 13, 2022, alongside the song, and was shown in major theaters across the United States. The band performs on the palm tree-covered outdoor stage under the sunset, with the images interspersed with a few clips from the film every now and then.

== Live performances ==
To promote the film and song with the release of its soundtrack, OneRepublic performed "I Ain't Worried" for the first time on May 28, 2022, on The Tonight Show Starring Jimmy Fallon. The band performed the song for the second time on Good Morning America (GMA) held on July 15, 2022, at Times Square Studios in Manhattan. The song was also a regular part of band setlist for the Never Ending Summer Tour. After the tour, on October 5, 2022, the band performed the song once again during The Late Late Show with James Corden. On November 13, 2022, the band performed "I Ain't Worried" at the 2022 MTV Europe Music Awards.

== Track listing ==
- Digital download
1. "I Ain't Worried" – 2:29
- EP version
1. "I Ain't Worried (ft. Becky G) [Latin Version]" – 2:16
2. "I Ain't Worried - Acoustic" – 2:29
3. "I Ain't Worried (Slowed + Reverb)" – 2:53
4. "I Ain't Worried (Sped Up)" – 2:08
5. "I Ain't Worried (Collins String Version)" – 2:31
6. "I Ain't Worried (Live from the MTV EMAs)" – 3:23

== Personnel ==
- Ryan Tedder – vocals, songwriter, production, vocal production
- Tyler Spry – songwriter, production, guitar, background vocals
- Brent Kutzle – songwriter, production
- Simon Oscroft – production, guitar
- John Nathaniel – co-production, mixing, background vocals
- John Eriksson – songwriter
- Peter Morén – songwriter
- Björn Yttling – songwriter
- Chris Gehringer – mastering
- Brandon Collins – additional programming
- Copeland Tedder – main background vocals
- Alisa Xayalith - background vocals

== Charts ==
=== Weekly charts ===
Weekly chart performance
| Chart (2022–2024) | Peak position |
|---|---|
| Australia (ARIA) | 2 |
| Austria (Ö3 Austria Top 40) | 10 |
| Belgium (Ultratop 50 Flanders) | 3 |
| Belgium (Ultratop 50 Wallonia) | 1 |
| Brazil Pop International Airplay (Crowley) | 9 |
| Bulgaria Airplay (PROPHON) | 1 |
| Canada Hot 100 (Billboard) | 3 |
| Canada AC (Billboard) | 16 |
| Canada CHR/Top 40 (Billboard) | 3 |
| Canada Hot AC (Billboard) | 1 |
| Colombia Anglo Airplay (National-Report) | 3 |
| Croatia International Airplay (Top lista) | 22 |
| Czech Republic Airplay (ČNS IFPI) | 40 |
| Czech Republic Singles Digital (ČNS IFPI) | 2 |
| Denmark (Tracklisten) | 12 |
| Finland Airplay (Radiosoittolista) | 8 |
| France (SNEP) | 7 |
| Germany (GfK) | 19 |
| Global 200 (Billboard) | 5 |
| Greece International (IFPI) | 10 |
| Hungary (Rádiós Top 40) | 1 |
| Hungary (Single Top 40) | 3 |
| Hungary (Stream Top 40) | 18 |
| Iceland (Tónlistinn) | 1 |
| Ireland (IRMA) | 4 |
| Italy (FIMI) | 49 |
| Japan Hot Overseas (Billboard Japan) | 3 |
| Latvia (LaIPA) | 15 |
| Lebanon Airplay (Lebanese Top 20) | 2 |
| Lithuania (AGATA) | 5 |
| Malaysia International (RIM) | 3 |
| Netherlands (Dutch Top 40) | 5 |
| Netherlands (Single Top 100) | 6 |
| New Zealand (Recorded Music NZ) | 1 |
| Norway (VG-lista) | 9 |
| Poland Airplay (ZPAV) | 5 |
| Poland (Polish Streaming Top 100) | 31 |
| Portugal (AFP) | 15 |
| Romania Airplay (TopHit) | 42 |
| Russia Airplay (TopHit) | 2 |
| San Marino (SMRTV Top 50) | 5 |
| Singapore (RIAS) | 3 |
| Slovakia Airplay (ČNS IFPI) | 11 |
| Slovakia Singles Digital (ČNS IFPI) | 6 |
| South Africa Streaming (TOSAC) | 10 |
| South Korea (Billboard) | 8 |
| South Korea (Circle) | 58 |
| Spain (PROMUSICAE) | 87 |
| Sweden (Sverigetopplistan) | 25 |
| Switzerland (Schweizer Hitparade) | 6 |
| Taiwan (Billboard) | 6 |
| UK Singles (Official Charts) | 3 |
| US Billboard Hot 100 | 6 |
| US Adult Contemporary (Billboard) | 12 |
| US Adult Pop Airplay (Billboard) | 1 |
| US Dance Airplay (Billboard) | 10 |
| US Pop Airplay (Billboard) | 6 |

=== Monthly charts ===
Monthly chart performance
| Chart (2022) | Position |
|---|---|
| Russia Airplay (TopHit) | 9 |
| South Korea (Circle) | 63 |

=== Year-end charts ===
Year-end chart performance
| Chart (2022) | Position |
|---|---|
| Australia (ARIA) | 9 |
| Austria (Ö3 Austria Top 40) | 45 |
| Belgium (Ultratop 50 Flanders) | 33 |
| Belgium (Ultratop 50 Wallonia) | 16 |
| Canada (Canadian Hot 100) | 27 |
| Denmark (Tracklisten) | 47 |
| France (SNEP) | 43 |
| Germany (Official German Charts) | 58 |
| Global 200 (Billboard) | 43 |
| Hungary (Single Top 40) | 13 |
| Hungary (Stream Top 40) | 40 |
| Lithuania (AGATA) | 22 |
| Netherlands (Dutch Top 40) | 12 |
| Netherlands (Single Top 100) | 27 |
| New Zealand (Recorded Music NZ) | 13 |
| Norway (VG-lista) | 27 |
| Poland (ZPAV) | 62 |
| Portugal (AFP) | 64 |
| Russia Airplay (TopHit) | 60 |
| South Korea (Circle) | 167 |
| Sweden (Sverigetopplistan) | 94 |
| Switzerland (Schweizer Hitparade) | 22 |
| UK Singles (OCC) | 20 |
| US Billboard Hot 100 | 37 |
| US Adult Contemporary (Billboard) | 41 |
| US Adult Top 40 (Billboard) | 17 |
| US Mainstream Top 40 (Billboard) | 25 |

| Chart (2023) | Position |
|---|---|
| Australia (ARIA) | 11 |
| Austria (Ö3 Austria Top 40) | 28 |
| Belgium (Ultratop 50 Flanders) | 54 |
| Belgium (Ultratop 50 Wallonia) | 60 |
| Canada (Canadian Hot 100) | 20 |
| Denmark (Tracklisten) | 72 |
| Estonia Airplay (TopHit) | 47 |
| Germany (Official German Charts) | 74 |
| Global 200 (Billboard) | 14 |
| Hungary (Rádiós Top 40) | 24 |
| Netherlands (Single Top 100) | 60 |
| New Zealand (Recorded Music NZ) | 18 |
| Poland (Polish Streaming Top 100) | 67 |
| Russia Airplay (TopHit) | 167 |
| Switzerland (Schweizer Hitparade) | 11 |
| UK Singles (OCC) | 24 |
| US Adult Contemporary (Billboard) | 39 |
| US Adult Top 40 (Billboard) | 41 |
| US Digital Song Sales (Billboard) | 33 |

| Chart (2024) | Position |
|---|---|
| Australia (ARIA) | 60 |
| Estonia Airplay (TopHit) | 200 |
| France (SNEP) | 138 |
| Global 200 (Billboard) | 62 |
| Switzerland (Schweizer Hitparade) | 80 |

== Certifications ==
Certifications for "I Ain't Worried"
| Region | Certification | Certified units/sales |
|---|---|---|
| Australia (ARIA) | 11× Platinum | 770,000^{‡} |
| Austria (IFPI Austria) | 3× Platinum | 90,000^{‡} |
| Belgium (BRMA) | Platinum | 40,000^{‡} |
| Brazil (Pro-Música Brasil) | 3× Platinum | 120,000^{‡} |
| Canada (Music Canada) | 9× Platinum | 720,000^{‡} |
| Denmark (IFPI Danmark) | 2× Platinum | 180,000^{‡} |
| France (SNEP) | Diamond | 333,333^{‡} |
| Germany (BVMI) | Platinum | 600,000^{‡} |
| Italy (FIMI) | 2× Platinum | 200,000^{‡} |
| New Zealand (RMNZ) | 6× Platinum | 180,000^{‡} |
| Poland (ZPAV) | 4× Platinum | 200,000^{‡} |
| Portugal (AFP) | 4× Platinum | 40,000^{‡} |
| Spain (Promusicae) | 2× Platinum | 120,000^{‡} |
| Switzerland (IFPI Switzerland) | 5× Platinum | 100,000^{‡} |
| United Kingdom (BPI) | 3× Platinum | 1,800,000^{‡} |
| United States (RIAA) | 5× Platinum | 5,000,000^{‡} |
Streaming
| Greece (IFPI Greece) | 2× Platinum | 4,000,000^{†} |
| Japan (RIAJ) | Gold | 50,000,000^{†} |
| Sweden (GLF) | Platinum | 8,000,000^{†} |
^{‡} Sales+streaming figures based on certification alone.^{†} Streaming-only figures based on certification alone.

== Release history ==
Release history for "I Ain't Worried"
| Region | Date | Format | Version | Label | Ref. |
|---|---|---|---|---|---|
| Various | May 13, 2022 | Digital download; streaming | Original | Mosley; Interscope | |
| United States | June 21, 2022 | Contemporary hit radio | Original | Interscope | |
| France | July 10, 2022 | Radio airplay | Original | Universal | |
| Italy | July 18, 2022 | Radio airplay | Original | Universal | |
| Various | August 5, 2022 | Digital download; streaming | Acoustic version | Mosley; Interscope | |
| Various | May 12, 2023 | Digital download; streaming | Versions | Mosley; Interscope | |

== See also ==
- List of highest-certified singles in Australia
