= Dear Santa (song) =

2023 song by OneRepublic

Single by OneRepublic
- Released: October 20, 2023
- Genre: Christmas • pop
- Length: 2:49
- Label: Mosley; Interscope
- Songwriters: Ryan Tedder; Brent Kutzle; Anna Graceman; John Nathaniel; Jeff Owen; Josh Varnadore
- Producers: Kutzle; Owen; Nathaniel

OneRepublic singles chronology
"Mirage" (2023)	"Dear Santa" (2023)	"I Don't Wanna Wait" (2024)

Music video
- "Dear Santa" on YouTube

"Dear Santa" is a Christmas song by American band OneRepublic, released a standalone single through Mosley and Interscope Records on October 21, 2023. A piano version of the song was released simultaneously.

== Background and composition ==
"Dear Santa" was written by band members Ryan Tedder and Brent Kutzle as well as Anna Graceman, John Nathaniel, Jeff Owen, and Josh Varnadore. It was also produced by Kutzle, Owen, and Nathaniel. The lyrics of the song describe wishing Santa Claus would bring a lover home for Christmas.

== Promotion ==
In promotion of "Dear Santa", the band a released a translucent 12" vinyl of the song as well as digital greeting cards with American Greetings.

== Music video ==
A music video for "Dear Santa" premiered on December 14, 2023 and was directed by Mr. Oz. The video is made from claymation and features a man sending a letter to Santa to wish for his lover back. The band members, as Santa's elves, create their instruments and send letters to the man and his lover who eventually fall back in love at the band's performance of the end of the song.

== Track listing ==
- 12"/digital download
1. "Dear Santa" – 2:49
2. "Dear Santa" (Piano Version) – 2:54

== Personnel ==
Credits for "Dear Santa" adapted from Apple Music.

Musicians

- Ryan Tedder – lead vocals
- Zach Filkins – lead guitar
- Drew Brown – rhythm guitar
- Brent Kutzle – bass guitar, programming
- Eddie Fisher – drums
- Brian Willett – keyboards

Additional musicians

- Anna Graceman – backing vocals
- John Nathaniel – programming, backing vocals
- Jeff Owen – programming, backing vocals
- Josh Varnadore – guitar
- David Angell – violin
- Monisa Angell – viola
- Paul Nelson – cello
- Marie-Josée Frigon – saxophone
- Brandon Collins – string arrangement

Production

- Chris Gehringer – mastering
- Kutzle – production
- Nathaniel – production, mixing
- Owen – production
- Doug Sarrett – mastering

== Charts ==
Chart performance for "Dear Santa"
Chart (2023–2025)	Peak position
Austria (Ö3 Austria Top 40)	56
Belgium (Ultratop 50 Flanders)	19
Canada Hot 100 (Billboard)	72
Canada AC (Billboard)	4
Canada Hot AC (Billboard)	37
Germany (GfK)	42
Netherlands (Single Top 100)	78
New Zealand Hot Singles (RMNZ)	24
Sweden (Sverigetopplistan)	75
Switzerland (Schweizer Hitparade)	80
US Bubbling Under Hot 100 (Billboard)	6
