= Never Ending Summer Tour =

2022 concert tour by OneRepublic

- Tour by OneRepublic
- Promotional poster for the tour
- Location: North America
- Associated album: Human
- Start date: July 16, 2022
- End date: September 14, 2022
- No. of shows: 36

OneRepublic concert chronology
- Live in Concert (2022); Never Ending Summer Tour (2022); The Artificial Paradise Tour (2024)

The Never Ending Summer Tour was the sixth headlining concert tour by American pop rock band OneRepublic, in support of their fifth studio album Human (2021). It began on July 16, 2022, in Bristow, Virginia and concluded on September 14, 2022, in Nashville, Tennessee. They were joined by Needtobreathe and special guests; Brynn Cartelli, Amy Allen, and John K.

== Background ==
OneRepublic announced the tour in February 2022.

=== Show synopsis ===
OneRepublic opens the show with their 2016 hit "Kids". The setlist if full of their hits, and multiple cover songs that were written by Tedder ("Halo", "Sucker", "Maps", etc.). When they play "I Ain't Worried" from Top Gun: Maverick, Tom Cruise introduces the song in a pre-recorded message, and clips from the movie are shown. Tedder leads a crowd participation during "Apologize", and at the beginning of the encore, Tedder surprises the crowd from being at the back of the venue, and starts singing "Counting Stars". He makes his way back up to the stage to finish the song and then goes into the show closer, "If I Lose Myself".

== Critical reception ==
Annette Ejofor of the Toronto Star said, "The evening was sweet, emotional and had everyone on their feet. It was a testament to the incredible artistry of Tedder and the entire OneRepublic band." A representative from We Heart Music attended the Kansas City show and said, "Love them or not, you can't deny the hit making of Colorado band OneRepublic and its leader, singer-songwriter Ryan Tedder's ability to consistently write a popular and memorable song, and that was especially on display during the group's hundred-minute headlining performance."

Grace Koennecke of The Post of Athens, Ohio gave the Cuyahoga Falls show a 5/5. She acknowledged their stage presence noting that they haven't lost it despite not touring in many years. And that "OneRepublic still knows how to put on a show and impress fans of all ages with their extensive musical catalog. From old songs to new ones, the band left their mark on Blossom's stage and reminded their audience that their talent is unmatched compared to most bands."

== Opening acts ==
- Needtobreathe
- Brynn Cartelli (select dates)
- Jessia (Toronto)
- John K (select dates)
- Amy Allen (select dates)

== Set list ==
This set list is a representation of the Holmdel, New Jersey show on July 17, 2022.

1. "Kids"
2. "Good Life" (contains elements of "Running Up That Hill")
3. "Stop and Stare"
4. "Rescue Me"
5. "Run"
6. "Secrets"
7. "Love Runs Out"
8. "Halo" (Beyoncé cover)
9. "Bleeding Love" / "Burn" / "Rumour Has It" / "Maps" / "Love Somebody" / "Thats What I Want" (Medley of songs written and produced by Ryan Tedder; Leona Lewis, Ellie Goulding, Adele, Maroon 5, Lil Nas X covers)
10. "Sucker" (Jonas Brothers cover)
11. "West Coast"
12. "I Ain't Worried"
13. "Apologize"
14. "I Lived"

Encore

15. "Counting Stars"
16. "If I Lose Myself"

=== Notes ===
- On July 16, in Bristow, OneRepublic performed "Lose Somebody" between "Sucker" and "West Coast".
- Starting with the show in Wantagh on July 20, "Run" was removed from the set list.
- On selected dates, the band performed "Feel Again" after "Sucker", replacing "West Coast".
- Starting with the show in Toronto, "Wherever I Go" was added to the set list, being performed after "Secrets".
- On July 22–23, August 31 and September 11, Tedder performed a sing-alone cover of "Beer Can't Fix" by Thomas Rhett and Jon Pardi after "Love Somebody" in the medley of cover songs.
- During the show in Noblesville, the band performed a snipped version of "Let's Hurt Tonight" before "If I Lose Myself", as part of the encore.
- On August 5, in Kansas City, OneRepublic performed "All the Right Moves" and "Everybody Loves Me" instead of "Wherever I Go".
- During the show in Tampa, Tedder performed a cover of "I Will Always Love You" by Whitney Houston before "Thats What I Want" in the medley of cover songs.
- During the last show in Charleston, the band performed a full cover of "Running Up That Hill" by Kate Bush, after "Good Life".

== Tour dates ==
List of 2022 concerts
Date	City	Country	Venue
July 16, 2022	Bristow	United States	Jiffy Lube Live
July 17, 2022	Holmdel	United States	PNC Bank Arts Center
July 19, 2022	Mansfield	United States	Xfinity Center
July 20, 2022	Wantagh	United States	Jones Beach Theater
July 22, 2022	Uncasville	United States	Mohegan Sun Arena
July 23, 2022	Gilford	United States	Bank of New Hampshire Pavilion
July 24, 2022	Camden	United States	Freedom Mortgage Pavilion
July 27, 2022	Toronto	Canada	Budweiser Stage
July 28, 2022	Cuyahoga Falls	United States	Blossom Music Center
July 30, 2022	Noblesville	United States	Ruoff Music Center
July 31, 2022	Cincinnati	United States	Riverbend Music Center
August 2, 2022	Clarkston	United States	Pine Knob Music Theatre
August 3, 2022	Tinley Park	United States	Hollywood Casino Amphitheatre
August 5, 2022	Kansas City	United States	Starlight Theatre
August 6, 2022	Maryland Heights	United States	Hollywood Casino Amphitheatre
August 7, 2022	Saint Paul	United States	Xcel Energy Center
August 9, 2022	Rogers	United States	Walmart Arkansas Music Pavilion
August 10, 2022	Tulsa	United States	BOK Center
August 12, 2022	Denver	United States	Ball Arena
August 13, 2022	West Valley City	United States	USANA Amphitheatre
August 16, 2022	Inglewood	United States	Kia Forum
August 17, 2022	Mountain View	United States	Shoreline Amphitheatre
August 19, 2022	Anaheim	United States	Honda Center
August 20, 2022	Chula Vista	United States	North Island Credit Union Amphitheatre
August 21, 2022	Phoenix	United States	Ak-Chin Pavilion
August 23, 2022	Albuquerque	United States	Isleta Amphitheater
August 25, 2022	Austin	United States	Germaina Insurance Amphitheater
August 26, 2022	Dallas	United States	Dos Equis Pavilion
August 28, 2022	The Woodlands	United States	Cynthia Woods Mitchell Pavilion
August 30, 2022	Alpharetta	United States	Ameris Bank Amphitheatre
August 31, 2022	Pelham	United States	Oak Mountain Amphitheatre
September 2, 2022	Tampa	United States	MidFlorida Credit Union Amphitheatre
September 3, 2022	West Palm Beach	United States	iTHINK Financial Amphitheatre
September 4, 2022	Jacksonville	United States	Daily's Place
September 11, 2022 (Note: The Charleston, SC was postponed from July 10 to September 11.)	Charleston	United States	Credit One Stadium
September 14, 2022	Nashville	United States	Bridgestone Arena
September 17, 2022	Napa	United States	Silverado Resort and Spa
September 22, 2022	Seattle	United States	Climate Pledge Arena

== Personnel ==
OneRepublic

- Ryan Tedder – Lead vocals, keyboards, rhythm guitar, percussion
- Zach Filkins – Lead guitar, viola, backing vocals
- Drew Brown – Rhythm guitar, keyboards, percussion, backing vocals
- Eddie Fisher – Drums, percussion, backing vocals
- Brent Kutzle – Bass guitar, cello, backing vocals
- Brian Willett – Keyboards, violin, drums, percussion, backing vocals
