= Sunshine (OneRepublic song) =

2021 single by OneRepublic

Single by OneRepublic

from the album Artificial Paradise
- Released: November 10, 2021
- Genre: Pop
- Length: 2:44
- Label: Interscope; Mosley
- Songwriters: Brent Kutzle; Casey Smith; Noel Zancanella; Ryan Tedder; Tyler Spry; Zach Skelton
- Producers: Ryan Tedder; Brent Kutzle; Tyler Spry; Simon Oscroft

OneRepublic singles chronology
"Someday" (2021)	"Sunshine" (2021)	"West Coast" (2022)

"Sunshine" is a song by American pop rock band OneRepublic. The song was released on November 10, 2021, through Interscope Records and Mosley Music Group. The band's frontman Ryan Tedder and bassist Brent Kutzle wrote the song with Casey Smith, Noel Zancanella Tyler Spry and Zach Skelton, while Tedder and Kutzle also produced it with Spry and Simon Oscroft. It is the lead single from the band's sixth studio album Artificial Paradise (2024).

The track was featured in various other pieces of media such as the 2021 film Clifford the Big Red Dog and the first gameplay trailer of the video game ANANTA.

== Content ==
"Sunshine" is the theme song from the film Clifford the Big Red Dog (2021). The song is written in the key of F major, with a tempo of 138 beats per minute. The song features a rap by Tedder during the bridge.

== Track listing ==
- Sunshine. The EP
1. "Sunshine" – 2:43
2. "Sunshine" (Acoustic Version) – 2:52
3. "Sunshine" (MOTi Remix)– 3:08
4. "Sunshine" (Jacaranda Remix) – 3:07

== Credits and personnel ==
- Brent Kutzle – producer, composer, lyricist
- Ryan Tedder – producer, composer, lyricist
- Simon Oscroft – producer, associated performer, engineer, guitar, studio personnel
- Tyler Spry – producer, composer, lyricist, associated performer, engineer, guitar, studio personnel
- Casey Smith – composer, lyricist
- Noel Zancanella – composer, lyricist
- Zach Skelton – composer, lyricist
- Brian Willett – associated performer, keyboards
- Joe Henderson – associated performer, engineer, studio personnel, vocal producer
- Loren Ferard – associated performer, guitar
- Chris Gehringer – mastering engineer, studio personnel
- John Nathaniel – mixer, studio personnel

== Charts ==
=== Weekly charts ===
Weekly chart performance for "Sunshine"
Chart (2021–2022)	Peak position
Austria (Ö3 Austria Top 40)	36
Belgium (Ultratop 50 Flanders)	25
Belgium (Ultratop 50 Wallonia)	25
Czech Republic Airplay (ČNS IFPI)	5
Czech Republic Singles Digital (ČNS IFPI)	31
Germany (GfK)	63
Netherlands (Dutch Top 40)	10
Netherlands (Single Top 100)	29
New Zealand Hot Singles (RMNZ)	32
Norway (VG-lista)	40
Slovakia (Singles Digitál Top 100)	84
Sweden (Sverigetopplistan)	72
Switzerland (Schweizer Hitparade)	14

=== Year-end charts ===
2022 year-end chart performance for "Sunshine"
Chart (2022)	Position
Belgium (Ultratop 50 Flanders)	62
Belgium (Ultratop 50 Wallonia)	100
Netherlands (Dutch Top 40)	52
Netherlands (Single Top 100)	79
Switzerland (Schweizer Hitparade)	44

== Certifications ==
Certifications for "Sunshine"
Region	Certification	Certified units/sales
Australia (ARIA) for EP	Platinum	70,000^{‡}
Austria (IFPI Austria)	Platinum	30,000^{‡}
Belgium (BRMA)	Gold	20,000^{‡}
Brazil (Pro-Música Brasil)	2× Platinum	80,000^{‡}
Canada (Music Canada)	2× Platinum	160,000^{‡}
Denmark (IFPI Danmark)	Gold	45,000^{‡}
Germany (BVMI)	Gold	200,000^{‡}
Italy (FIMI)	Gold	50,000^{‡}
New Zealand (RMNZ)	Platinum	30,000^{‡}
Poland (ZPAV)	Gold	25,000^{‡}
Spain (Promusicae)	Gold	30,000^{‡}
Switzerland (IFPI Switzerland)	Platinum	20,000^{‡}
United Kingdom (BPI)	Gold	400,000^{‡}
United States (RIAA)	Platinum	1,000,000^{‡}
^{‡} Sales+streaming figures based on certification alone.
