= Anker Palace =

Building in Terézváros, Budapest, Hungary

Coordinates: 47.49785656907723°N 19.0553552708005°E

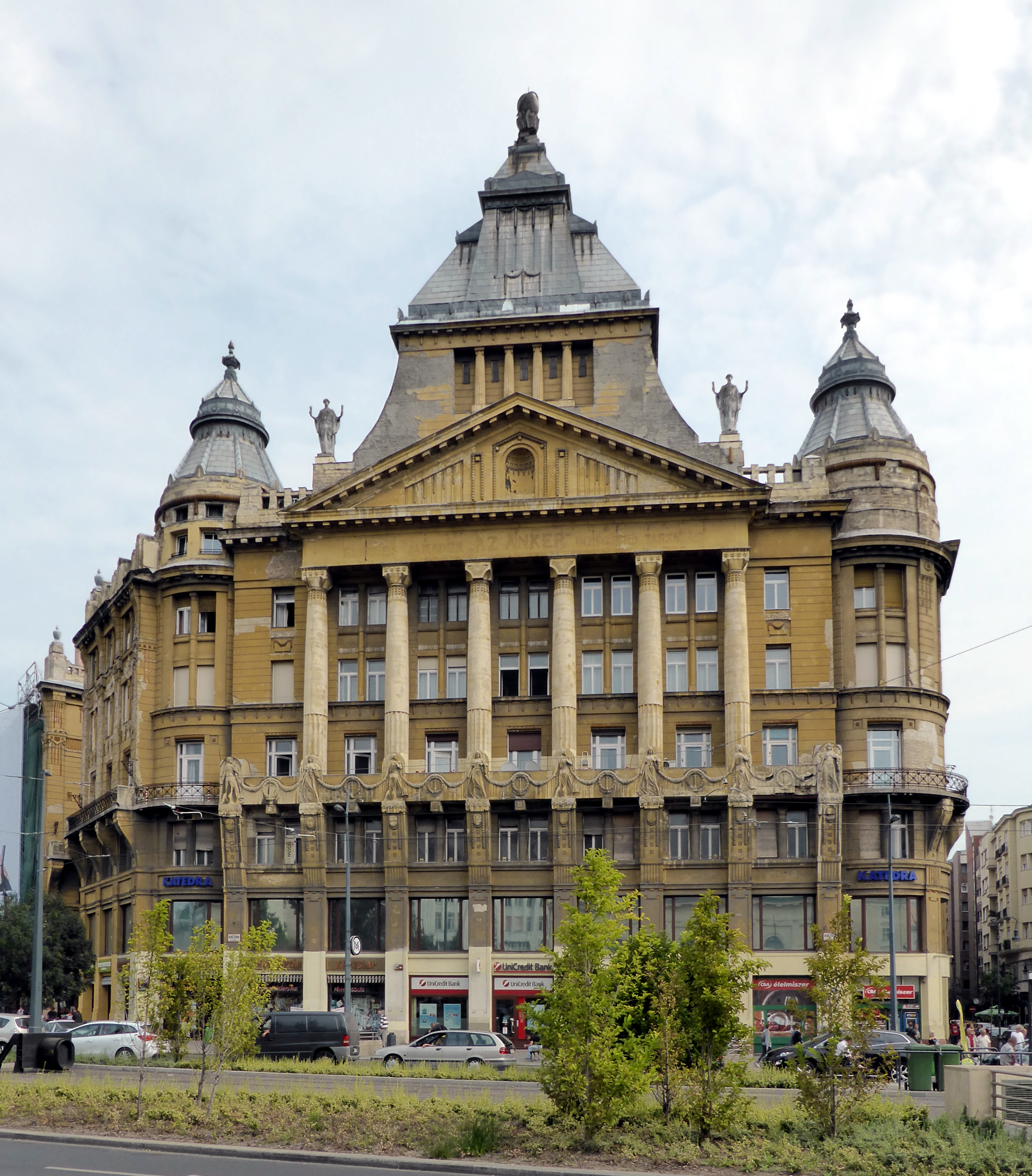
Anker Palace, September 2014

Anker Palace (Hungarian: Anker-palota) is a building in Terézváros, Budapest. It was built by Ignác Alpár in 1908 for a Viennese insurance company, the Anker Life and Pension Insurance Company. The building was built in the eclectic style and was completed in 1910. It faces on to Deák Ferenc Square. There are Doric columns on the facade and two statues of women with outstretched arms on the roof.

== Anker Köz ==
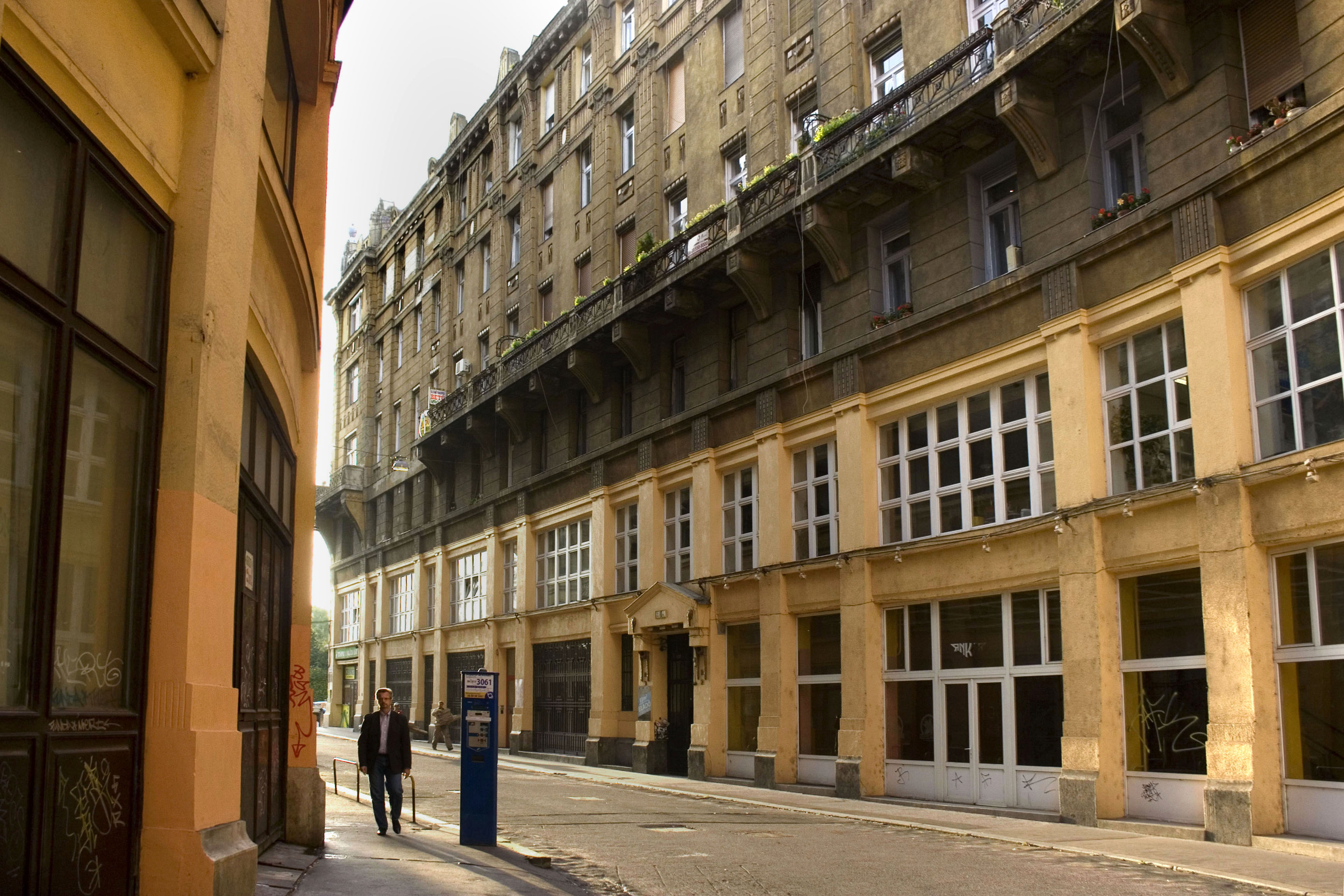
Anker Köz

Anker Köz (alley) runs in a curve around the rear of the building. The Galileo Circle was based here, 1910-1919.

== Notable residents ==
- Geza Hofi
- Léopold Szondi
