= Fire (Meduza, OneRepublic and Leony song) =

Single by Meduza, OneRepublic and Leony

from the album Artificial Paradise (Deluxe) and Oldschool Love
- Released: 10 May 2024
- Recorded: November - December 2023
- Genre: EDM • dance-pop • progressive house
- Length: 2:48
- Label: Island Records; Virgin; Cross
- Songwriters: Luca de Gregorio; Mattia Vitale; Simone Giani; Ryan Tedder; Brent Kutzle; Leonie Burger; Josh Varnadore; Tyler Spry; Vitali Zestovskih
- Producer: Meduza

Meduza singles chronology
"Money (Can't Save Us)" (2024)	"Fire" (2024)	"Origami" (2024)

OneRepublic singles chronology
"Nobody" (2024)	"Fire" (2024)	"Hurt" (2024)

Leony singles chronology
"Simple Life" (2024)	"Fire" (2024)	"City Lights" (2024)

Music video
- "Fire" on YouTube

"Fire (Official UEFA Euro 2024 Song)", or simply "Fire", is a song by Italian electronic trio Meduza, American band OneRepublic, and German singer Leony. It was released on 10 May 2024 through Island, Virgin, and Cross Records. The song was released as the official song of the UEFA Euro 2024 tournament. The song was originally supposed to include fellow German singer Kim Petras, but it was announced in March she had withdrawn from production due to scheduling issues and was replaced with Leony. The song was performed live by all three artists at the tournament's closing ceremony. The song is also included on the deluxe edition of OneRepublic's sixth studio album Artificial Paradise and on Leony's second studio album, Oldschool Love.

== Background and composition ==
"Fire" was written by Meduza, OneRepublic lead singer Ryan Tedder, and Leony and produced by Meduza. They described the song in a statement with UEFA:

Now more than ever, the power of music to unite us is undeniable. As huge football fans, we're thrilled to combine our passion for the game with our music for UEFA Euro 2024.

— Meduza

== Promotion ==
The song was first heard as an instrumental on a social media post by UEFA Euro 2024 in December 2023. On 24 March, a video with leaked shots of a photoshoot and small snippets was revealed. It was officially announced by Meduza on 18 April. It was played live for the first time at Drumsheds in London, England on 27 April. Both OneRepublic and Leony started promoting the song as well as its release date approached.

Following the song's release, the hashtag #lightyourfire was created to give fans a chance to win final tickets.

== Music video ==
The music video for "Fire" was released 24 May 2024 and was directed by Kevin Ferstl. The video features clips of children playing football, players from previous tournaments playing and people watching the tournament on TV. There are also clips of Tedder performing from a rooftop, OneRepublic performing coming onto the field at the Allianz Arena in Munich and Leony singing in the seats and Meduza standing in the field of the Olympiastadion in Berlin, Germany, where the final match was played.

== Track listing ==
- 12"/digital download
1. "Fire" (Official UEFA Euro 2024 Song) – 2:49
2. "Fire" (Orchestral Version) [with Bruce Liu] – 2:21

== Personnel ==
Credits for "Fire" adapted from Apple Music.

Musicians
- Luca de Gregorio – keyboards, programming, synthesiser, percussion
- Mattia Vitale – keyboards, programming, synthesiser, percussion
- Simone Giani – keyboards, programming, synthesiser, percussion
- Ryan Tedder – lead vocals, songwriting
- Leony – lead vocals, songwriting
Production
- de Gregorio – production, mixing, mastering
- Vitale – production, mixing, mastering
- Giani – production, mixing, mastering

== Charts ==
=== Weekly charts ===
Weekly Chart performance for "Fire"
Chart (2024–2025)	Peak position
Austria (Ö3 Austria Top 40)	49
Belarus Airplay (TopHit)	49
Belgium (Ultratop 50 Flanders)	45
CIS Airplay (TopHit)	178
Czech Republic Airplay (ČNS IFPI)	2
Estonia Airplay (TopHit)	16
Germany (GfK)	29
Latvia Airplay (TopHit)	10
Lithuania Airplay (TopHit)	38
Netherlands (Dutch Top 40)	16
Netherlands (Single Top 100)	68
Slovakia Airplay (ČNS IFPI)	28
Switzerland (Schweizer Hitparade)	68

=== Monthly charts ===
Monthly chart performance for "Fire"
Chart (2024–2025)	Peak position
Belarus Airplay (TopHit)	58
Czech Republic (Rádio – Top 100)	5
Estonia Airplay (TopHit)	21
Latvia Airplay (TopHit)	18
Lithuania Airplay (TopHit)	46
Slovakia (Rádio Top 100)	33

=== Year-end charts ===
Year-end chart performance for "Fire"
Chart (2024)	Position
Estonia Airplay (TopHit)	64
Latvia Airplay (TopHit)	159
Netherlands (Dutch Top 40)	87

== Certifications ==
Certifications for "Fire"
Region	Certification	Certified units/sales
Brazil (Pro-Música Brasil)	Gold	20,000^{‡}
^{‡} Sales+streaming figures based on certification alone.
