= I Don't Wanna Wait (David Guetta and OneRepublic song) =

Single by David Guetta and OneRepublic

from the album Artificial Paradise (Deluxe)
- Released: 5 April 2024
- Genre: Electro house; progressive house; EDM; dance-pop; eurodance
- Length: 2:29
- Label: What a DJ; Warner UK
- Songwriters: David Guetta; Dan Balan; Ryan Tedder; Michael Pollack; Aldae; Brent Kutzle; Jakke Erixson; Josh Varnadore; Tyler Spry; Timofey Reznikov
- Producers: David Guetta; Brent Kutzle; Tyler Spry; Jakke Erixson; Timofey Reznikov

David Guetta singles chronology
"The Future Is Now/The Truth" (2024)	"I Don't Wanna Wait" (2024)	"Feeling Good" (2024)

OneRepublic singles chronology
"Dear Santa" (2023)	"I Don't Wanna Wait" (2024)	"Nobody" (2024)

Music video
- "I Don't Wanna Wait" on YouTube

"I Don't Wanna Wait" is a song by French DJ David Guetta and American pop rock band OneRepublic, released on 5 April 2024 through What a DJ and Warner Music UK. Guetta and OneRepublic frontman Ryan Tedder built the song based on the melody of "Dragostea Din Tei" by the Moldovan Eurodance group O-Zone, along with Michael Pollack, Aldae, Brent Kutzle, Jakke Erixson, Josh Varnadore, Tyler Spry and Timofey Reznikov, while Guetta, Kutzle, Spry, Erixson and Renizkov produced it. It is included on the deluxe edition of OneRepublic's sixth studio album Artificial Paradise.

== Background ==
"I Don't Wanna Wait" was debuted during Guetta's set at the Ultra Music Festival in Miami on 23 March 2024, with Tedder joining him on stage to sing the song.

== Music video ==
The music video was released on 25 April 2024 and includes footage of Guetta's performance of the song at the Ultra Music Festival intercut with a story showing a couple on a night out.

== Charts ==
=== Weekly charts ===
Weekly chart performance for "I Don't Wanna Wait"
Chart (2024–2025)	Peak position
Australia (ARIA)	57
Australia Dance (ARIA)	6
Austria (Ö3 Austria Top 40)	8
Belarus Airplay (TopHit)	15
Belgium (Ultratop 50 Flanders)	10
Belgium (Ultratop 50 Wallonia)	4
Bulgaria Airplay (PROPHON)	4
Canada Hot 100 (Billboard)	27
Canada AC (Billboard)	20
Canada CHR/Top 40 (Billboard)	33
Canada Hot AC (Billboard)	33
CIS Airplay (TopHit)	3
Czech Republic Airplay (ČNS IFPI)	17
Czech Republic Singles Digital (ČNS IFPI)	19
Denmark (Tracklisten)	19
Estonia Airplay (TopHit)	4
Finland (Suomen virallinen radiolista)	5
France (SNEP)	13
Germany (GfK)	10
Global 200 (Billboard)	29
Greece International (IFPI)	93
Honduras Anglo Airplay (Monitor Latino)	7
Hungary (Dance Top 40)	5
Hungary (Rádiós Top 40)	1
Ireland (IRMA)	18
Israel International Airplay (Media Forest)	2
Italy (FIMI)	70
Japan Hot Overseas (Billboard Japan)	8
Kazakhstan Airplay (TopHit)	10
Latvia Airplay (LAIPA)	14
Lithuania (AGATA)	53
Lithuania Airplay (TopHit)	7
Luxembourg (Billboard)	5
Moldova Airplay (TopHit)	11
Netherlands (Dutch Top 40)	6
Netherlands (Single Top 100)	12
New Zealand Hot Singles (RMNZ)	10
Norway (VG-lista)	19
Poland (Polish Airplay Top 100)	10
Poland (Polish Streaming Top 100)	41
Portugal (AFP)	65
Romania Airplay (Media Forest)	3
Romania TV Airplay (Media Forest)	5
Russia Airplay (TopHit)	6
Serbia Airplay (Radiomonitor)	1
Slovakia Airplay (ČNS IFPI)	6
Slovakia Singles Digital (ČNS IFPI)	25
Spain (Promusicae)	83
Sweden (Sverigetopplistan)	12
Switzerland (Schweizer Hitparade)	7
Turkey International Airplay (Radiomonitor Türkiye)	1
Ukraine Airplay (TopHit)	45
UK Singles (OCC)	19
UK Dance (OCC)	1
US Billboard Hot 100	96
US Adult Pop Airplay (Billboard)	19
US Hot Dance/Electronic Songs (Billboard)	4
US Pop Airplay (Billboard)	36

=== Monthly charts ===
Monthly chart performance for "I Don't Wanna Wait"
Chart (2024)	Position
Belarus Airplay (TopHit)	20
CIS Airplay (TopHit)	7
Czech Republic (Rádio Top 100)	22
Czech Republic (Singles Digitál Top 100)	20
Estonia Airplay (TopHit)	8
Kazakhstan Airplay (TopHit)	19
Latvia Airplay (TopHit)	8
Lithuania Airplay (TopHit)	7
Moldova Airplay (TopHit)	37
Romania Airplay (TopHit)	24
Russia Airplay (TopHit)	12
Slovakia (Rádio Top 100)	9
Slovakia (Singles Digitál Top 100)	24
Ukraine Airplay (TopHit)	84

=== Year-end charts ===
2024 year-end chart performance for "I Don't Wanna Wait"
Chart (2024)	Position
Australia Dance (ARIA)	17
Austria (Ö3 Austria Top 40)	21
Belarus Airplay (TopHit)	48
Belgium (Ultratop 50 Flanders)	22
Belgium (Ultratop 50 Wallonia)	17
Canada (Canadian Hot 100)	48
CIS Airplay (TopHit)	39
Denmark (Tracklisten)	45
Estonia Airplay (TopHit)	10
France (SNEP)	50
Germany (GfK)	22
Global 200 (Billboard)	127
Hungary (Dance Top 40)	26
Hungary (Rádiós Top 40)	16
Kazakhstan Airplay (TopHit)	120
Netherlands (Dutch Top 40)	23
Netherlands (Single Top 100)	31
Poland (Polish Airplay Top 100)	56
Russia Airplay (TopHit)	83
Sweden (Sverigetopplistan)	37
Switzerland (Schweizer Hitparade)	20
UK Singles (OCC)	59
US Hot Dance/Electronic Songs (Billboard)	10

2025 year-end chart performance for "I Don't Wanna Wait"
Chart (2025)	Position
Belarus Airplay (TopHit)	85
Belgium (Ultratop 50 Flanders)	138
Canada AC (Billboard)	59
CIS Airplay (TopHit)	134
Estonia Airplay (TopHit)	124
Hungary (Dance Top 40)	21
Hungary (Rádiós Top 40)	3
Switzerland (Schweizer Hitparade)	100

== Certifications ==
Certifications for "I Don't Wanna Wait"
Region	Certification	Certified units/sales
Australia (ARIA)	Platinum	70,000^{‡}
Austria (IFPI Austria)	Platinum	30,000^{‡}
Belgium (BRMA)	Platinum	40,000^{‡}
Canada (Music Canada)	Platinum	80,000^{‡}
Denmark (IFPI Danmark)	Platinum	90,000^{‡}
France (SNEP)	Diamond	333,333^{‡}
Germany (BVMI)	Gold	300,000^{‡}
Italy (FIMI)	Gold	50,000^{‡}
New Zealand (RMNZ)	Platinum	30,000^{‡}
Poland (ZPAV)	2× Platinum	100,000^{‡}
Portugal (AFP)	Platinum	10,000^{‡}
Spain (Promusicae)	Platinum	60,000^{‡}
Switzerland (IFPI Switzerland)	Gold	15,000^{‡}
United Kingdom (BPI)	Platinum	600,000^{‡}
Streaming
Greece (IFPI Greece)	Gold	1,000,000^{†}
^{‡} Sales+streaming figures based on certification alone.^{†} Streaming-only figures based on certification alone.

== See also ==
- List of Billboard number-one dance songs of 2024
