= Mirage (OneRepublic song) =

2023 song by OneRepublic featuring Mishaal Tamer

Single by OneRepublic featuring Mishaal Tamer

from the album Artificial Paradise
- Released: September 22, 2023
- Genre: Worldbeat, Arabic pop
- Length: 2:13
- Label: Mosley; Interscope
- Songwriters: Ryan Tedder; Mishaal Tamer; Brendan Angelides; Grant Boutin; Will Jay; Coleton Rubin
- Producers: Boutin; Tedder

OneRepublic singles chronology
"Runaway" (2023)	"Mirage" (2023)	"Dear Santa" (2023)

Mishaal Tamer singles chronology
"Disco Cowboy" (2023)	"Mirage" (2023)	"Painful Paradise" (2023)

Music video
- "Mirage" on YouTube

"Mirage (for Assassin's Creed Mirage)", or simply "Mirage" is a song by American pop rock band OneRepublic featuring Saudi Arabian singer Mishaal Tamer released in promotion of the Ubisoft video game Assassin's Creed Mirage. It was released through Mosley and Interscope Records on September 22, 2023. The song is the fifth single from OneRepublic’s sixth studio album Artificial Paradise (2024).

== Background and composition ==
"Mirage" was written by Ryan Tedder, Mishaal Tamer, Brendan Angelides, and Grant Boutin. It was produced by Tedder and Boutin and mixed by Serban Ghenea. The song was written and produced in Bangkok and Tokyo within four days, immediately after receiving the request for the song. Tamer was added as a vocalist after the band wanted to have a Middle Eastern artist in the song and was the best choice as he was touring with the band on the Artificial Paradise Tour. In a statement, Tedder described the desire for the song:

Most people don’t know this about me, but my band and I are closet gamers. Having toured extensively in the Middle East, I wanted to capture the spirit of that region and reflect the location of the game sonically as much as possible...this was a definite pinch myself moment.

— Ryan Tedder

The song's lyrics describe the similar story of the Assassins of Assassin's Creed, with a self-determined theme carried through the verses. Tamer's bridge is in Arabic and, according to the official video's translation, describes persevering when others falter.

== Music video ==
A music video for "Mirage" premiered on September 22, 2023 and was directed by Tomás Whitmore. The video features Tedder as an Assassin with other band members and Tamer performing in a dark tunnel with moving and atmospheric lighting intermittent with cinematic footage of Assassin's Creed Mirage. The video was shot in Malta, close in time to the band's set at Isle of MTV, inside a tunnel where soldiers would march before going to battle.

== Charts ==
Chart performance for "Mirage"
Chart (2023)	Peak position
New Zealand Hot Singles (RMNZ)	31
San Marino (SMRRTV Top 50)	35

== See also ==
- Music of Assassin's Creed
