= Kempinski Hotel Corvinus, Budapest =

Hotel in Budapest, Hungary

Coordinates: 47°29′49.67″N 19°3′8.18″E

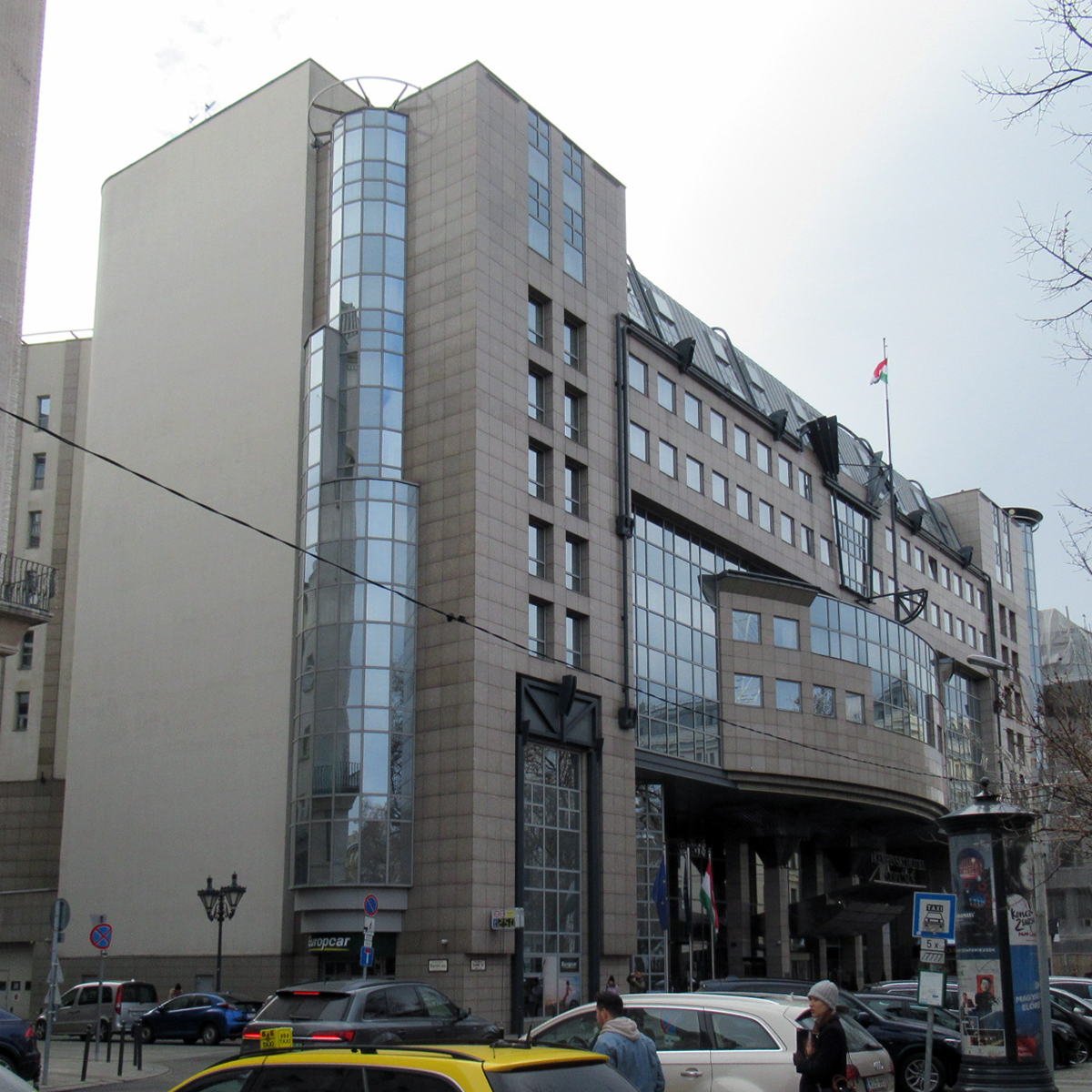
Entrance

Kempinski Hotel Corvinus, a member of the Kempinski group, is a five star hotel in Budapest, Hungary. It has a Forbes four-star rating.

The hotel is located in the city centre of Pest in the district of Erzsébetváros, next to Erzsébet Square, near the Danube, Dohány Street Synagogue, St. Stephen's Basilica, Andrássy Avenue, Hungarian State Opera House, and the British Embassy in Budapest.

The C-shape building was designed by Hungarian architect József Finta, and as a hotel opened in 1992 with 335 rooms, 31 suites, restaurants, bar, spa and conference facilities.

The hotel is named after King Matthias Corvinus, who ruled Hungary in the late 15th century.

The American pop rock band OneRepublic recorded the song "I Ain't Worried" during the 2021 MTV Europe Music Awards in November at the Hotel where they stayed during the song's release on May 13.
