= Arena Mall (Budapest) =

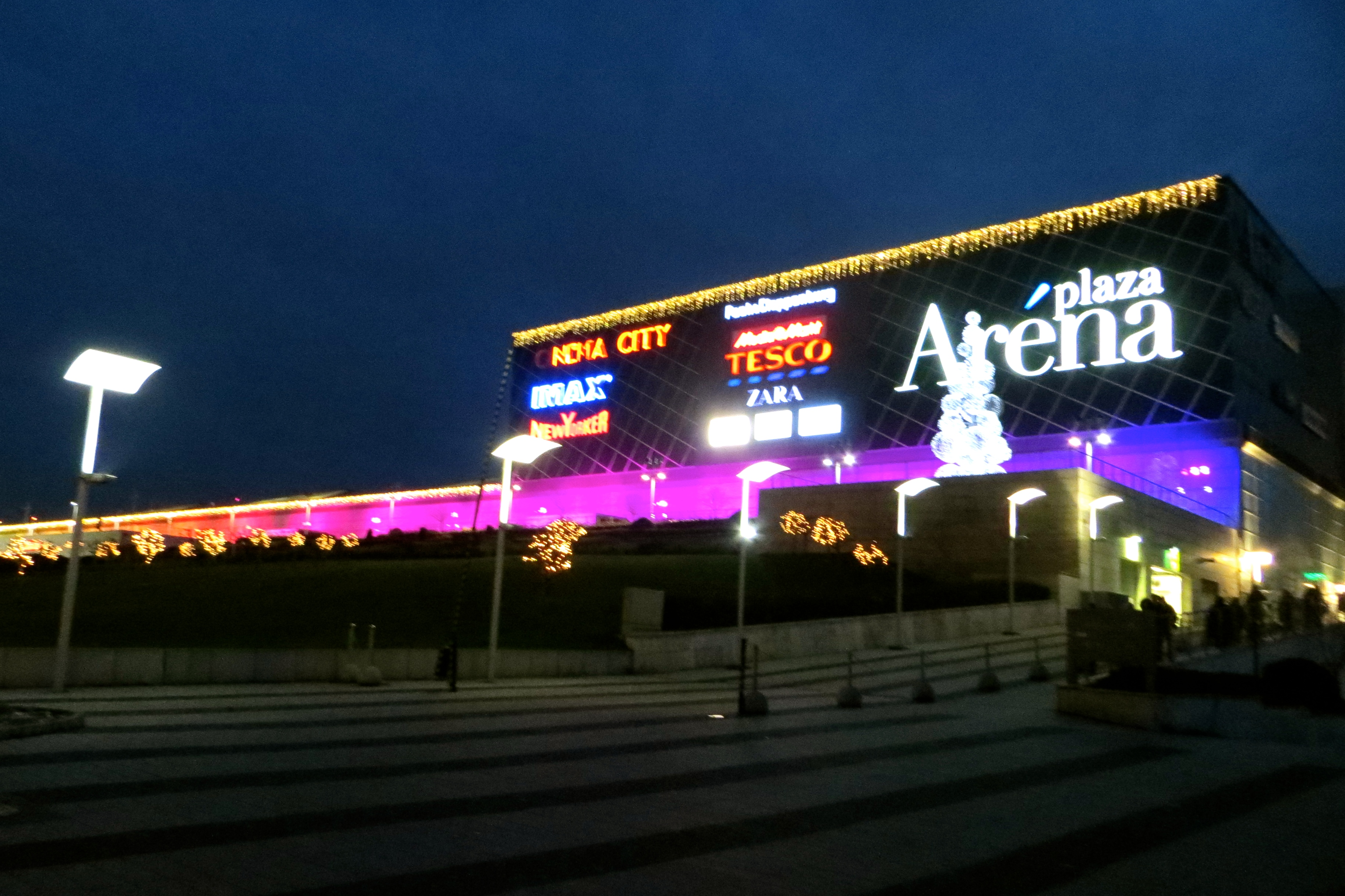
- Decorated for the holidays
- Location: Budapest, Hungary
- Coordinates: 47°29′54″N 19°5′29.71″E
- Address: 1087 Budapest; Kerepesi Avenue 9
- Developer: Plaza Centers B. V.
- Owner: Plaza Centers B. V.
- Num. of stores: 400+
- Num. of anchor tenants: 9
- Floor area: 180,000 square metres (1,900,000 sq ft)
- Floors: 3 floors
- Parking: Underground parking: 2,800
- Website: www.arenamall.hu/en

Arena Mall (formerly known as Aréna Plaza) is the largest shopping plaza in Budapest at a size of 200,000 m^{2} (2,200,000 sq ft). On November 15, 2007, Arena Plaza opened at the site of an old horse racing track.

The project was developed by Plaza Centers Group, a shopping center developer in Central and Eastern Europe (CEE). Plaza Centers Group credits itself as the first developer to bring Western-style shopping centers to Hungary. The executive of Plaza Centers says during the opening in 2007, “Arena Plaza is one of the largest and most prestigious shopping and entertainment centres in Central and Eastern Europe, the design and ambition of which has set new standards for the region..."

The center includes the country's first IMAX cinema auditorium, along with 22 other screens. It includes many stores for shopping, dining, and entertainment. A major focal point is the large Tesco, a hypermarket.

== Access ==
Arena Plaza is located approximately five minutes walking distance from Keleti Railway Station.

The shopping center has approximately 2,800 underground parking spaces.

== Sales ==
On August 7, 2007, Arena Plaza was sold to active Asset Investment Management ("aAIM"). The transaction was closed at a gross yield of 5.9%, reflecting an approximately 381 million Euro asset value. This represented 20% of the value of 2007 Hungarian real estate deals and the largest single transaction for that year. The price compares to the November 2006 IPO of €333 million.
