= Kálvin Square Reformed Church =

Coordinates: 47°29′19″N 19°03′40″E

- Hungarian: Kálvin téri református templom
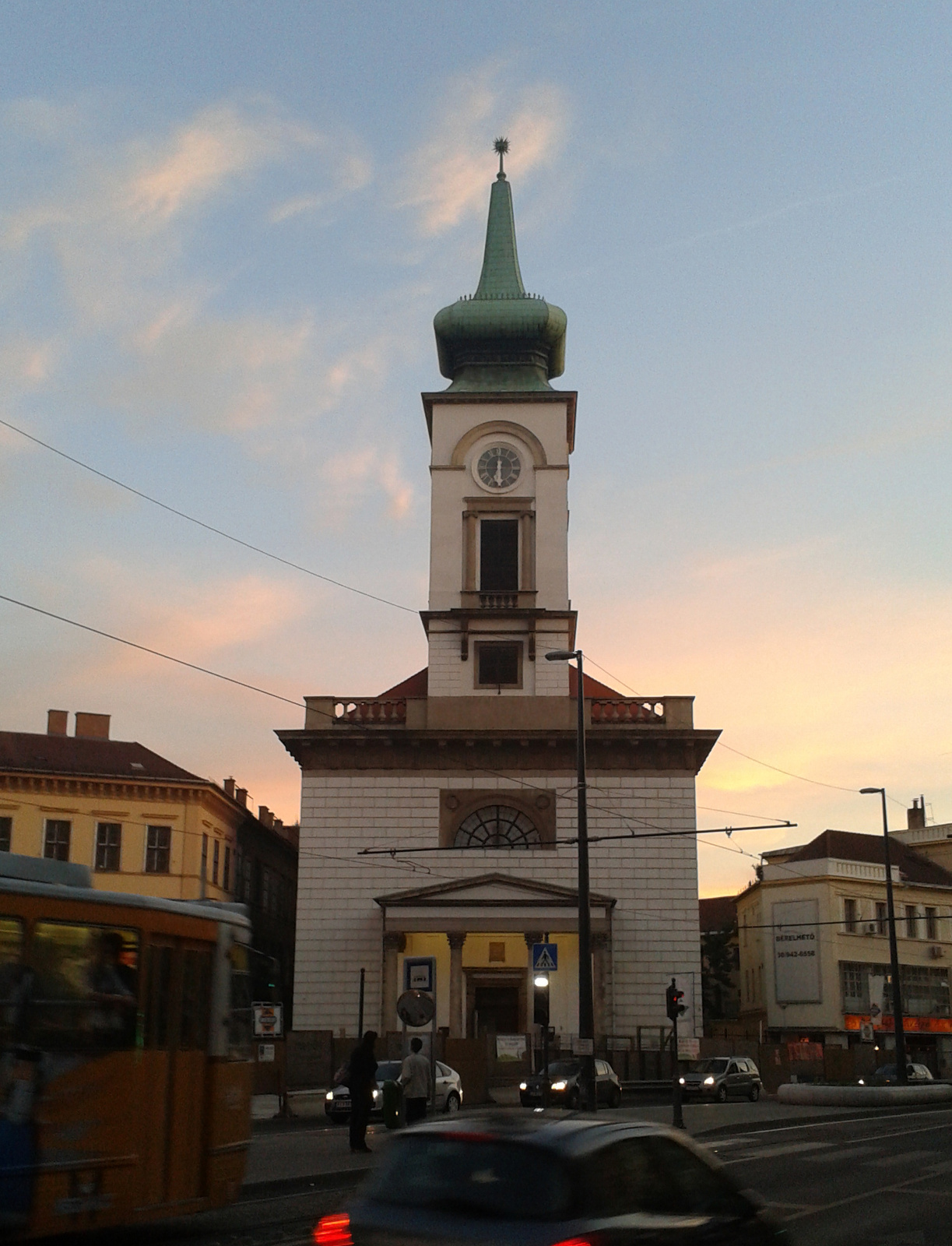
- Main façade of the church from Kálvin tér, 2011

- Location within Budapest Location within Hungary
- Location: Kálvin tér, Budapest
- Country: Hungary
- Denomination: Reformed Christianity

Architecture
- Functional status: Active
- Architect(s): József Hofrichter, Vince Hild
- Style: Neoclassicism
- Years built: 1816–1830

Administration
- Parish: Reformed Congregation of Budapest–Kálvin Square

The Kálvin Square Reformed Church (Hungarian: Kálvin téri református templom) is a historic Protestant church located on Kálvin Square in central Budapest, Hungary. It is one of the most important Reformed (Calvinist) churches in the country and serves as a spiritual and cultural center for the Hungarian Reformed community.

== History ==
The congregation of Pest's Reformed community was established in the late 18th century, and initially held services in a small prayer house. In 1801, the city of Pest donated a plot of land on today's Kálvin Square for the construction of a larger church.

The foundation stone was laid on 12 July 1816, and construction continued until 1830. The building was designed in the Neoclassical style by architect József Hofrichter. The first service took place on 29 August 1830, even though interior works continued afterwards.

The church's principal patron was Princess Hermine of Anhalt-Bernburg-Schaumburg-Hoym, wife of Archduke Joseph, Palatine of Hungary, who actively supported Protestant institutions in the country. Following her death in 1817, she was interred in the church's crypt; her remains were later transferred to Buda Castle after the Great Flood of Pest in 1838.

The 1838 flood caused extensive damage to the building, prompting major repairs and alterations. During this restoration, the church received a portico with a triangular pediment and Doric columns, under the supervision of Vince Hild. In 1859, the tower was modified once more, gaining a new dome that replaced the earlier pointed roof, crafted by carpenter János Buchhold.

== Architecture ==
The Kálvin tér Reformed Church is built in a simple, restrained Neoclassical style, reflecting the Calvinist emphasis on sobriety and clarity rather than ornamentation. Its façade is dominated by four Doric columns supporting a triangular pediment. The single central tower rises above the main entrance and is capped by a copper-clad dome.

The church interior is organized around a central pulpit, typical of Reformed church design. Because of its large volume, the acoustics were initially problematic; later architectural adjustments included the installation of a sound canopy above the pulpit and side galleries to improve audibility.

== Burials ==
The church's crypt serves as the resting place of several prominent figures in Hungarian Reformed and national history, including András Fáy, writer and philanthropist.

The building also contains the memorial of Charlotte Strachan, wife of Count Emanuel Zichy-Ferraris. The burial of the countess, who was an Anglican and died of suicide in 1851, stirred some debate, and the ornate sarcophagus dedicated to her was housed in an adjoining section, instead of placed inside the church proper and the crypt.

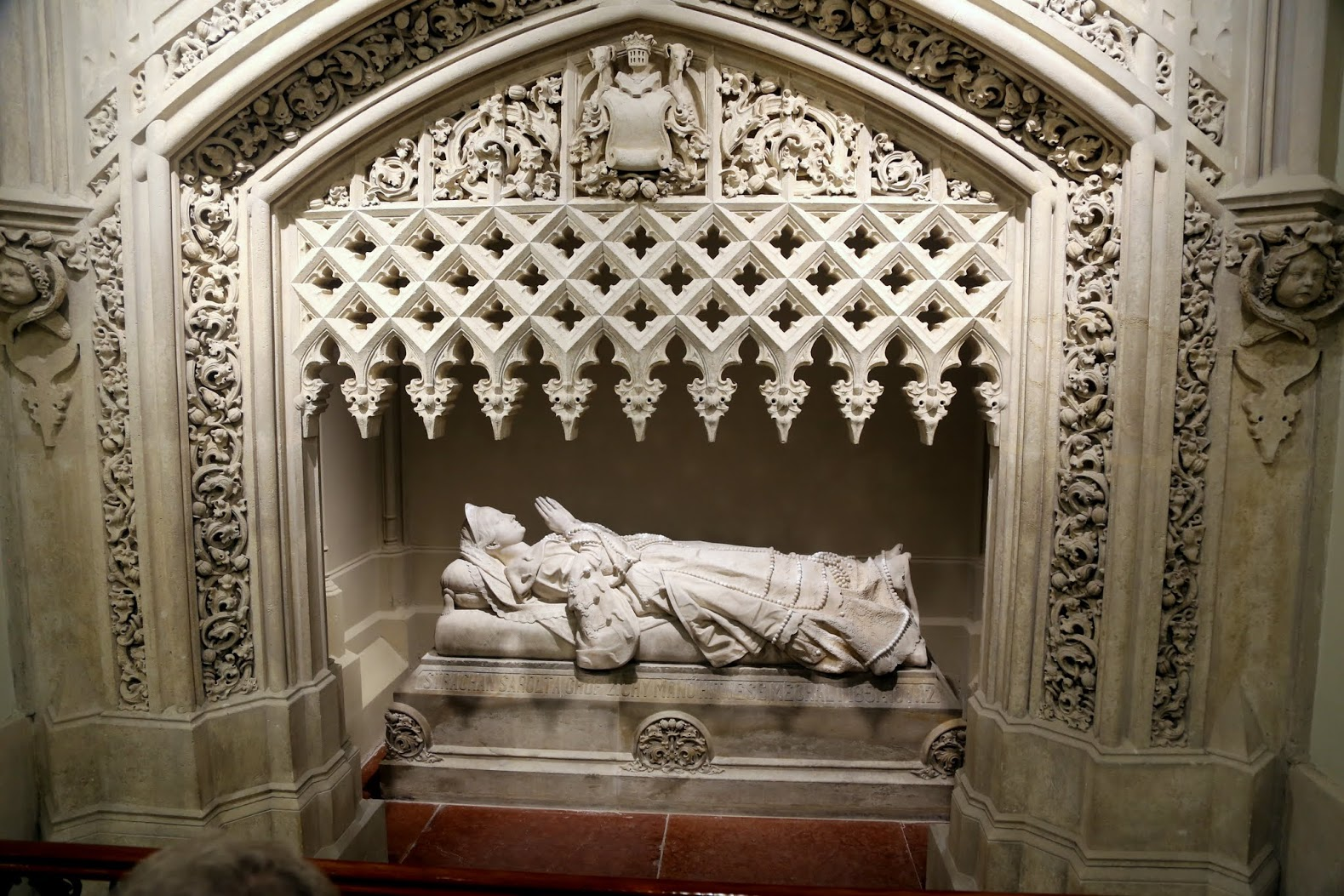
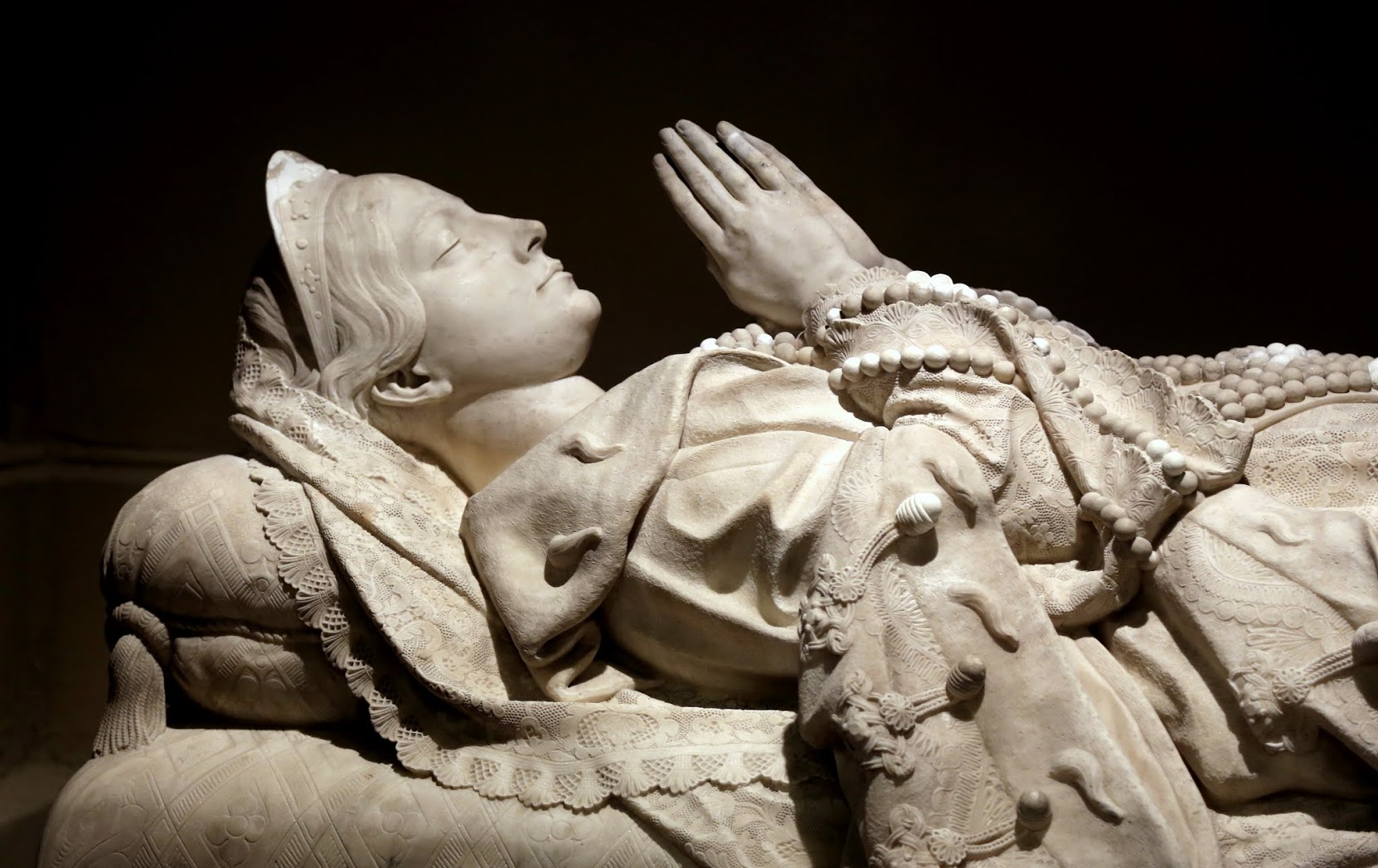
The sarcophagus of Charlotte Strachan, Countess Zichy-Ferraris
