= Visit California =

Tourism organization

- Industry: Tourism
- Founded: 1998
- Website: www.visitcalifornia.com

Visit California is a nonprofit organization self-tasked with developing and maintaining marketing programs to further develop tourism in California. This organization was previously known as the California Travel & Tourism Commission before its reorganization.

Funding of the organization is through taxes (known as assessments) on tourism related businesses, such as hotels.

== Visit California Awards ==
The annual Poppy Awards are a biennial contest to recognize the best of Californian tourism. Nomination criteria include that entries must promote tourism to/within California and that entries must demonstrate an impact on tourism.

== See also ==
- Tourism in California
