= Berlin discography =

- Studio albums: 9
- EPs: 2
- Live albums: 2
- Compilation albums: 6
- Singles: 15
- Video albums: 3
- Music videos: 11
- Promotional singles: 3

American new wave band Berlin has released nine studio albums, two live albums, six compilation albums, two extended plays, 15 singles, three promotional singles, three video albums and 11 music videos.

== Albums ==
=== Studio albums ===
List of studio albums, with selected chart positions and certifications
| Title | Details | Peak chart positions | | | | | | | | | | Certifications |
| Title | Details | US | US Indie | AUS | CAN | FIN | GER | NLD | NZ | SWE | UK | Certifications |
|---|---|---|---|---|---|---|---|---|---|---|---|---|
| Information | Released: 1980; Label: Vinyl; Format: LP | — | — | — | — | — | — | — | — | — | — | |
| Pleasure Victim | Released: October 1982 (Note: Pleasure Victim was re-released on January 26, 1983, by Geffen Records.); Label: Enigma; Formats: CD, LP, cassette | 30 | — | — | 22 | — | — | — | 12 | — | — | RIAA: Platinum; RMNZ: Platinum |
| Love Life | Released: March 12, 1984; Label: Geffen; Formats: CD, LP, cassette | 23 | — | 55 | 85 | — | — | — | 3 | — | — | RIAA: Gold; RMNZ: Platinum |
| Count Three & Pray | Released: October 13, 1986; Label: Geffen; Formats: CD, LP, cassette | 61 | — | 38 | 85 | 26 | 61 | 29 | 20 | 40 | 32 | BPI: Silver |
| Voyeur | Released: August 20, 2002; Label: Heavensake Inc., iMusic; Format: CD | — | — | — | — | — | — | — | — | — | — | |
| 4play | Released: October 25, 2005; Label: Majestic; Formats: CD, digital download | — | — | — | — | — | — | — | — | — | — | |
| Animal | Released: September 17, 2013; Label: Something-Music; Formats: CD, digital download | — | — | — | — | — | — | — | — | — | — | |
| Transcendance | Released: August 2, 2019; Label: Cleopatra; Formats: CD, LP, digital download | — | 32 | — | — | — | — | — | — | — | — | |
| Strings Attached | Released: 2020; Label: August Day Recordings; Formats: CD, LP, digital download | — | — | — | — | — | — | — | — | — | — | |
"—" denotes a recording that did not chart or was not released in that territory.

=== Live albums ===
| Title | Details |
|---|---|
| Live: Sacred and Profane | Released: April 18, 2000; Label: Time Bomb; Formats: CD, cassette |
| All the Way In | Released: July 7, 2009; Label: Fuel 2000; Formats: CD+DVD, digital download |

=== Compilation albums ===
| Title | Details | Certifications |
|---|---|---|
| Dancing in Berlin | Released: March 10, 1987 (Japan only); Label: Mercury; Formats: CD, LP | |
| Best of Berlin 1979–1988 | Released: November 8, 1988; Label: Geffen; Formats: CD, LP, cassette | RIAA: Gold |
| Master Series | Released: March 4, 1997 (Europe only); Label: Mercury; Format: CD | |
| The Greatest Hits Remixed | Released: March 28, 2000; Label: Cleopatra; Format: CD | |
| Metro Greatest Hits | Released: June 22, 2004; Label: Cleopatra; Formats: CD, digital download | |
| Greatest Hits | Released: July 28, 2009; Label: Cleopatra; Formats: LP, digital download | |

== Extended plays ==
| Title | Details |
|---|---|
| Fall Into Heaven | Released: 1999; Label: Heavensake Productions; Format: CD |
| Fall Into Heaven 2 | Released: 1999; Label: Heavensake Productions; Format: CD |

== Singles ==
List of singles, with selected chart positions and certifications, showing year released and album name
| Title | Year | Peak chart positions | | | | | | | | | | Certifications | Album |
| Title | Year | US | AUS | BEL (FL) | CAN | FIN | GER | IRE | NLD | NZ | UK | Certifications | Album |
|---|---|---|---|---|---|---|---|---|---|---|---|---|---|
| "A Matter of Time" | 1979 | — | — | — | — | — | — | — | — | — | — | | Information |
| "The Metro" | 1981 | 58 | — | — | — | — | — | — | — | — | — | | Pleasure Victim |
| "Sex (I'm a ...)" | 1982 | 62 | 81 | — | 4 | 19 | — | — | — | 18 | — | | Pleasure Victim |
| "Pleasure Victim" | 1982 | — | 89 | — | — | — | — | — | — | — | — | | Pleasure Victim |
| "Masquerade" | 1983 | 82 | — | — | — | — | — | — | — | — | — | | Pleasure Victim |
| "No More Words" | 1984 | 23 | 23 | — | — | — | — | — | — | 5 | — | | Love Life |
| "Now It's My Turn" | 1984 | 74 | — | — | — | — | — | — | — | — | — | | Love Life |
| "Dancing in Berlin" | 1984 | — | 39 | — | — | — | — | — | — | 12 | — | | Love Life |
| "Touch" | 1984 | — | — | — | — | — | — | — | — | — | — | | Love Life |
| "Take My Breath Away" | 1986 | 1 | 2 | 1 | 2 | 13 | 3 | 1 | 2 | 4 | 1 | RIAA: Gold; BPI: Platinum; MC: Gold; RMNZ: 2× Platinum | Top Gun and Count 3 & Pray |
| "Like Flames" | 1986 | 82 | 18 | 10 | — | 14 | 36 | — | 17 | 30 | 47 | | Count 3 & Pray |
| "You Don't Know" | 1986 | — | — | 16 | — | — | — | 29 | — | — | 39 | | Count 3 & Pray |
| "Take My Breath Away" (reissue) | 1990 | — | — | — | — | — | — | 7 | — | — | 3 | | Non-album single |
| "It's the Way" | 2013 | — | — | — | — | — | — | — | — | — | — | | Animal |
| "Transcendance" | 2019 | — | — | — | — | — | — | — | — | — | — | | Transcendance |
"—" denotes a recording that did not chart or was not released in that territory.

=== Promotional singles ===
| Title | Year | Album |
|---|---|---|
| "Fascination" | 1980 | Information |
| "Pink and Velvet" | 1986 | Count 3 & Pray |
| "With a Touch" | 2003 | Voyeur |

== Guest appearances ==
List of non-single guest appearances, showing year released and album name
| Title | Year | Album |
|---|---|---|
| "Jealous" | 1985 | Just One of the Guys: Original Motion Picture Soundtrack |
| "Live to Tell" | 1999 | Virgin Voices: Tribute to Madonna, Volume One |
| "Shayla" | 2000 | Platinum Girl: A Tribute to Blondie |
| "The Dope Show" | 2001 | A Tribute to Marilyn Manson: Anonymous Messiah |

== Videography ==
=== Video albums ===
| Title | Details | Notes |
|---|---|---|
| Berlin Video 45 | Released: 1984; Label: Geffen; Formats: VHS, LaserDisc | Features the music videos for "No More Words", "The Metro", "Dancing in Berlin", "Sex (I'm a ...)", and "Now It's My Turn".; The LaserDisc version was simply titled Berlin.; In Australia, the VHS release was titled The Videosingles and features a rearranged track listing. |
| Wam Bam, Live in Japan | Released: August 25, 1987 (Japan only); Label: Pioneer Electronic Corporation; Formats: VHD, LaserDisc | |
| Intimate | Released: November 25, 2003; Label: Image Entertainment; Format: DVD | |

=== Music videos ===
List of music videos, showing year released and directors
| Title | Year | Director |
|---|---|---|
| "The Metro" | 1983 | Dominic Orlando |
| "Sex (I'm a ...)" | 1983 | Marcelo Epstein |
| "Masquerade" | 1983 | Alan Holtzman |
| "Sex (I'm a ...)" (version two) | 1984 | Russell Mulcahy |
| "No More Words" | 1984 | Evan English and Paul Goldman |
| "Now It's My Turn" | 1984 | Jim Yukich |
| "Dancing in Berlin" | 1984 | Jim Yukich |
| "Take My Breath Away" | 1986 | Marcello Anciano |
| "Like Flames" | 1986 | Greg Masuak |
| "You Don't Know" | 1987 | Greg Masuak |
| "Animal" | 2014 | Chad Michael Ward |
