= Best of Berlin 1979–1988 =

Greatest hits album by Berlin
- Released: 1988
- Recorded: 1982–1988
- Genres: New wave, synth-pop
- Length: 52:29
- Label: Geffen
- Producer: Various

Berlin chronology
Dancing in Berlin (1987)	Best of Berlin 1979–1988 (1988)	Master Series (1997)

Professional ratings
Review scores
Source	Rating
Allmusic	4/5 stars

Best of Berlin 1979–1988 is a compilation album by the American new wave band Berlin, released in 1988.

== Track listing ==
No.	Title	Original Album	Length
1.	"Blowin' Sky High"	New song	4:40
2.	"No More Words"	Love Life	3:53
3.	"Like Flames"	Count Three & Pray	5:06
4.	"Take My Breath Away"	Top Gun soundtrack, Count Three & Pray	4:13
5.	"Sex (I'm a ...)"	Pleasure Victim	5:08
6.	"Now It's My Turn"	Love Life	4:12
7.	"Masquerade"	Pleasure Victim	4:06
8.	"You Don't Know"	Count Three & Pray	4:28
9.	"A Matter Of Time"	Information	3:56
10.	"The Metro"	Pleasure Victim	4:09
11.	"Will I Ever Understand You"	Count Three & Pray	4:42
12.	"For All Tomorrow's Lies"	New recording of song from Love Life	3:56
Total length:			52:29
