= Live: Sacred and Profane =

Live album by Berlin
- Released: April 18, 2000
- Length: 64:12
- Label: Time Bomb Recordings
- Producer: Terri Nunn (tracks 1-12); Meeks (tracks 13-15); Jamie Dunlap (co-producer, tracks 13-15)

Berlin chronology
Dancing in Berlin (1987)	Live: Sacred and Profane (2000)	Voyeur (2002)

Live: Sacred and Profane is a live album from American new wave band Berlin, released in 2000 by Time Bomb Recordings. The band's first live album, it features twelve live tracks and three new studio tracks. The live tracks were recorded at the Coach House, San Juan Capistrano, California on December 4, 1999.

== Critical reception ==
Professional ratings
Review scores
Source	Rating
AllMusic	2.5/5 stars
PopMatters	unfavorable

Upon release, Ben Varkentine of PopMatters said: "If you like these songs you're better off seeking out a greatest hits collection; as the new, increased guitar arrangements don't add anything particularly memorable to the old songs." Doug Stone of AllMusic commented that the album "holds more guts than expected considering the vast keyboard capacity of Terri Nunn's vehicle" and the "melodies remain sharp, haunting, and hot". He concluded: "Live: Sacred and Profane is a surprise treat from an unlikely concert attraction."

== Track listing ==
No.	Title	Writer(s)	Length
1.	"Masquerade"	Chris Ruiz-Velasco	4:10
2.	"Touch"	John Crawford, David Diamond, Terri Nunn	3:18
3.	"No More Words"	Crawford	3:33
4.	"Steps"	Nunn, Steven Seibold	3:23
5.	"You Don't Know"	Crawford	5:03
6.	"The Metro"	Crawford	4:31
7.	"Turn You On"	Nunn, Seibold, Pamela Phillips Oland	4:45
8.	"For All Tomorrow's Lies"	Crawford	4:09
9.	"Confession Time"	Karl Hyde, Nunn, Rick Smith	3:59
10.	"Tell Me Why"	Crawford	5:05
11.	"Sex (I'm a ...)"	Crawford, Nunn, Diamond	4:18
12.	"Take My Breath Away"	Giorgio Moroder, Tom Whitlock	6:07
13.	"Shayla"	Chris Stein	4:24
14.	"Angel's Wings"	Nunn, Charlotte Caffey	4:22
15.	"Xgirl"	Nunn, Caffey	3:05

== Personnel ==
- Terri Nunn - vocals, producer (tracks 1–12), mixing (tracks 13–15), art direction
- Scott Peets - engineer (tracks 1–12)
- Jay Baumgardner - mixing (tracks 1–12)
- Meeks - producer and mixing (tracks 13–15)
- Jamie Dunlap - co-producer, engineer and mixing (tracks 13–15)
- Gilby Clarke - vocal engineering (tracks 13–15)
- Tom Baker - mastering
- Jolie Clemens - art direction, front cover photography
- Ron W. Burch, Suzy Ligon - live photography
