= Moment of Truth (Terri Nunn album) =

Studio album by Terri Nunn
- Released: 1991 (US); 21 January 1992 (Europe)
- Studio: Paisley Park, Chanhassen, Minnesota; Ocean Way, Hollywood, California
- Genre: Pop rock, pop, rock
- Length: 53:46
- Label: DGC, Mercury
- Producer: David Z, Steve Brown (track 1)

Moment of Truth is the debut and sole solo album from American singer Terri Nunn, who is best known as lead singer of the band Berlin. It was released in the US in 1991 and Europe in 1992. Moment of Truth was produced by and mixed by Prince's Paisley Park Records producer David Z., except for "Confession Time", which was produced by the British producer Steve Brown.

== Background ==
Nunn recorded Moment of Truth following Berlin's split in 1987. It was recorded at Paisley Park Studios in Chanhassen, while "Confession Time" was recorded at Ocean Way Recording in Los Angeles. The album was released in the United States in 1991, and Europe and Japan in 1992. The album was not a commercial success, nor was the single "Let Me Be the One", which was released in January 1992. "89 Lines" was also released as a promotional single in the US. Following this album, Nunn went on to gain the rights for the usage of Berlin's name after legal wranglings with the founding member of the group, John Crawford. Nunn recreated Berlin, with a new line-up of musicians, in 1998.

In a late 1990s interview with Electrogarden, Nunn explained that she had left Berlin to try new styles of sound and music. However, in a 1996 interview with The Telegraph-Herald, she dismissed the album and described it as "transitional".

== Writing ==
The album's songs were written from 1988 to 1991 by various composers, with Nunn receiving writing credit for six of the eleven tracks. Speaking to the Beaver County Times in 1992, Nunn said: "When I wrote this album, I'd planned to expose myself a lot more with my writing. All of the musicians I grew up idolizing and loving, that's what I loved about them - David Bowie, Grace Slick, Bonnie Raitt. They exposed themselves and how they were growing through their music. That helped me as a person, as well as listening to the music and getting off on the oral high. It was a communication." While promoting her album on CNBC, Nunn revealed the album was lyrically more personal to Nunn than the Berlin albums.

"Desire Me" is based on sexual desire. Nunn said of the song on CNBC: "It came out of two weeks of being extremely horny. There wasn't anybody around at the time, I wasn't in a relationship, and so at least something came out of it." "Once Upon a Time" is based on the suicide of Nunn's father, while "Diane" speaks of domestic abuse from husband to wife. In her interview with the Beaver County Times, Nunn spoke of both tracks: "The hardest song was the song about Dad. That took me three years, just pulling it out, trying new things. I got to resolve a lot through the process. Wife abuse ("Diane") is a definite message to a friend. The truth helps write the song and the song helps bring the truth around." The song "89 Lines" speaks of racism, with Nunn portraying a black male.

== Release ==
Moment of Truth was released in the US by DGC Records and by Mercury Records in Europe and Japan. In the US, the album was released on cassette and CD, while in Europe the album was only released on CD. In 1991, a special US CD promo sampler was released featuring a total of eight tracks. Four Berlin hit tracks were used: "Take My Breath Away", "No More Words", "Sex (I'm A...)" and "The Metro", along with four tracks from Moment of Truth: "Let Me Be the One", "89 Lines", "Who's Gonna Take You Home Tonight" and "Fly by Night". A live version of "Confession Time" was later released on the 2000 live album Live: Sacred and Profane from Berlin.

== Promotion ==
Nunn appeared on CNBC to perform "Let Me Be the One" on November 11, 1991.

== Reception ==
Professional ratings
Review scores
Source	Rating
AllMusic	2/5 stars
Chicago Tribune	1.5/4 stars
Orlando Sentinel	1/5 stars

Upon release, Billboard felt the album was a "seriously out-of-date and thinly produced package", adding: "Playing out homogenized vocal and lyrical moves well mined by Pat Benatar a decade or more ago, Nunn overreaches on such tracks as "Desire Me" and the title track." Brenda Herrmann of the Chicago Tribune felt Nunn still had a "wonderful voice", but that the album's material was weak. She commented: "Songs like "Let Me Be the One" and "Who's Gonna Take You Home Tonight" are nearly indistinguishable from Heart hits like "Alone" or "Who Will You Run To". The "Moment of Truth" is that Nunn wants to make some bucks - even if it is in adult contemporary radio."

The Orlando Sentinel said "Singers are always leaving bands to pursue their own musical identities. But Terri Nunn apparently took the singular route of defecting from Berlin to pursue an identity crisis. On her solo debut, Nunn can't make up her mind whether to be the poor man's Johnette Napolitano, Pat Benatar, Ann Wilson or Debbie Harry. Nunn's songwriting is strictly of the generic-confessional variety, and the songs by outside writers are just as formulaic and pedestrian. The host of backing musicians provide a thoroughly unexceptional setting." Trouser Press commented: "This dull-as-dirt generic rock pancake fails to establish Nunn as anything but... the former singer of Berlin. In the little world of Moment of Truth — which more than anything sounds like late-'80s Pat Benatar outtakes — it is."

Pan-European magazine Music & Media commented: "This is powerful stuff from Nunn. Synthladen timeless power-wave reflects shades of the late '70s and early '80s. From the Tubeway Army synthsounds in "Confession Time" to "Once Upon a Time" with its Concrete Blonde-meets-Shakespeare's Sister-feel, Nunn finds the right melodic blend of hooks 'n heavies." Alex Henderson of AllMusic said: "With Berlin having hit an artistic high note on 1986's Count Three and Pray, it was most regrettable when the trio broke up. Moment of Truth made the breakup seem all the more regrettable. Nunn delivers a run-of-the-mill pop/rock offering that isn't terrible, but pales in comparison to her inspired performances on Berlin gems. Despite a few decent spots, including the rap/rock protest song "89 Lines" and the single "Let Me Be the One," the album really isn't worth the price of admission."

== Track listing ==
No.	Title	Writer(s)	Length
1.	"Confession Time"	Karl Hyde, Terri Nunn, Rick Smith	4:27
2.	"Desire Me"	Nunn, Michael Caruso, John Keller	4:28
3.	"Once Upon a Time"	Nunn, Hyde, Darrell Brown	4:50
4.	"Moment of Truth"	Nunn, Hyde	5:27
5.	"Let Me Be the One"	Mark Leonard, Sue Shifrin	4:16
6.	"89 Lines"	Tina Harris, Daniel O'Brien	6:16
7.	"Who's Gonna Take You Home Tonight"	Martin Page	3:54
8.	"Go Ask the Lonely"	Keller, Marcy Levy	4:17
9.	"Too Far to Fall"	Nunn, Hyde, Brown	5:38
10.	"Fly by Night"	Ric Ocasek	4:27
11.	"Diane"	Nunn, Caruso, Keller	5:43

== Personnel ==
- Terri Nunn - vocals
- Karl Hyde - electric guitar, acoustic guitar, 6-string bass, sitar, backing vocals
- Tim Pierce - additional guitar (tracks 2, 5, 7–11), acoustic guitar (track 3)
- David Z - additional guitar (tracks 3, 5–6, 8, 10–11), sitar (tracks 2–4, 10), drums (tracks 2, 4, 6, 8–11), additional percussion and drums (tracks 3, 8), distorted bass (track 6), additional background vocals (track 7)
- Andrew Flashman - piano, organ, keyboards
- Ricky Peterson - additional keyboards (tracks 2–3, 5–7), additional background vocals (track 7), keyboards (track 8)
- Kenny Holman - saxophone (track 4)
- Jason P. Delaire - saxophone (track 10)
- Bruce Kurnow - harmonica (track 2)
- Bob Griffin - bass (tracks 2–3, 6, 9, 11)
- Levi Seacer, Jr. - bass (track 4), guitar solo (track 5), additional background vocals (track 7), bass solo (track 8), additional guitar (track 10)
- Mark Leonard - bass (tracks 5, 7, 9), keyboards (track 5)
- Billy Ward - drums (tracks 3, 5, 7, 11), additional drums (track 10)
- Randy Castillo - drums (track 1)
- St. Paul Peterson - additional background vocals (tracks 2–3, 7), bass (tracks 8, 10), guitar (track 8)
- The Steeles - background vocals (tracks 5, 8)
- Patti Peterson - additional background vocals (track 7)

Production

- David Z - producer (tracks 2–11), mixing, recording
- Steve Brown - producer (track 1)
- Tom Garneau - additional engineer
- Additional Engineer – Tom Garneau
- Bernie Grundman - mastering

Art and Design

- Larry Vigon - art direction
- Debra Shallman - album coordination
- Robin Sloane - creative director
- Brian Jackson, Larry Vigon - design
- Horst Stasny - photography
