= Count Three and Pray =

Count Three and Pray may refer to:

- Count Three & Pray, a 1986 album by Berlin
- Count Three and Pray (film), a 1955 western film starring Van Heflin and Joanne Woodward
