= Take My Breath Away =

1986 single by Berlin

Single by Berlin

from the album Top Gun and Count Three & Pray
- B-side: "Radar Radio"
- Released: June 1986
- Recorded: 1986
- Genre: Synth-pop; new wave
- Length: 4:13
- Label: Columbia
- Composer: Giorgio Moroder
- Lyricist: Tom Whitlock
- Producer: Giorgio Moroder

Berlin singles chronology
"Dancing in Berlin" (1984)	"Take My Breath Away" (1986)	"Like Flames" (1987)

Music video
- "Take My Breath Away" on YouTube

Audio sample
- of "Take My Breath Away": file; help

"Take My Breath Away" is a song written by Giorgio Moroder and Tom Whitlock for the 1986 film Top Gun's soundtrack, performed by American new wave band Berlin and included on their album Count Three & Pray. The song won the Academy Award for Best Original Song at the 59th Academy Awards, as well as the Golden Globe Award for Best Original Song at the 44th Golden Globe Awards in 1986.

== Background ==
Italian musician Giorgio Moroder was asked by Jerry Bruckheimer, the co-producer for Top Gun, to write a song for the film's soundtrack. He first wrote "Danger Zone" which was recorded by Kenny Loggins. Happy with the result, Bruckheimer then requested a slower song for a romantic scene. Once Moroder had written the musical backing to what would become "Take My Breath Away", he recorded a demo which featured a distinctive bass sound on a synthesizer that would later be used on the actual recording. Moroder gave the demo to lyricist Tom Whitlock. The two first became acquainted when Whitlock, a mechanic, fixed the brakes on Moroder's Ferrari, and informed him that he was also a lyricist. Whitlock wrote the lyrics while driving home from the studio, and then spent a few hours at home polishing them. A demo of the song, sung by a background singer, impressed director Tony Scott and producers Bruckheimer and Don Simpson, who decided to film new romantic scenes between Tom Cruise and Kelly McGillis to feature the song.

The song was first offered to The Motels, who much later released their original demo, which is fairly similar to Berlin's released version, on their compilation album Anthologyland (2001). Columbia Records suggested some of their signed artists, including Alison Moyet, but eventually Moroder thought of the band Berlin, whose song "No More Words" he had produced. Whitlock made a few changes to the lyrics before Terri Nunn recorded the vocals. Moroder has said that of all the songs he has produced in his career, he is most proud of this song.

== Releases and performances ==
"Take My Breath Away" was the second single from the Top Gun soundtrack album, following Kenny Loggins' "Danger Zone", and was released in 1986 as a split single alongside the song "Radar Radio", performed by Moroder featuring Joe Pizzulo.

The song peaked at number one on the Billboard Hot 100, and also topped the charts in the United Kingdom, the Netherlands, Ireland and Belgium. It later went on to win Best Original Song at the 59th Academy Awards.

"Take My Breath Away" is available on both the original Top Gun soundtrack album and the expanded edition. The song was also featured on Berlin's fourth studio album, Count Three & Pray (1986) and, as the band's biggest hit, on several of the band's compilation albums: Best of Berlin 1979–1988, Master Series, Greatest Hits Remixed (which includes a "Mission UK Remix" version), Live: Sacred and Profane, and Metro Greatest Hits. "Take My Breath Away" was one of the few songs not written by Berlin's John Crawford that they had performed on any album up to that point. Following the release of "Take My Breath Away", the band split over different points of view regarding the track: while Nunn viewed it as an opportunity that allowed the band to perform worldwide, Crawford disliked it as it had not been written or composed by any of them. He later said: "None of us had ever heard it. None of us had anything to do with it. I didn't play on it. Nobody played on it. No one wrote it".

"Take My Breath Away" was re-released in the United Kingdom in October 1990 to coincide with the first television showing of Top Gun (by ITV, on the evening of October 6, 1990), as well as Peugeot's television advertising campaign for the 405 model range. The re-release reached number three on the UK Singles Chart.

In 2017, ShortList's Dave Fawbert listed the song as containing "one of the greatest key changes in music history".

== Music video ==
The music video features scenes from the film Top Gun intermingled with Berlin's singer Terri Nunn performing the song in blue coveralls, walking between parts of planes in a windy aircraft boneyard (part of the Mojave Air and Space Port) at night. Bandmates John Crawford and Rob Brill are shown relaxing in the yard and then following Nunn.

Nunn's coveralls appear to be scorched (as if her character was in an accident), and where she appears, surrounding electric lights come to life akin to paranormal phenomena associated with ghosts. As her bandmates watch, Nunn is greeted by the ghostly appearance of military airmen of various eras. Nunn and the military men disappear into thin air at the end of the video, indicating they were all ghosts in the boneyard, and a reference to the titular lyric of the song.

The video can be seen occasionally on VH1 Europe's Top 10 Movie Soundtracks program. It was later included on the 2004 Top Gun collector's edition DVD.

Also, in the comedy film Nicky Larson et le parfum de Cupidon (2018).

== Track listings ==
- 7-inch single

A. "Take My Breath Away" – 4:13
B. "Radar Radio" (performed by Giorgio Moroder featuring Joe Pizzulo) – 3:40

- UK 12-inch single

A. "Take My Breath Away" – 4:13
B1. "You've Lost That Lovin' Feelin'" (performed by The Righteous Brothers)
B2. "Radar Radio" (performed by Giorgio Moroder featuring Joe Pizzulo) – 3:40

- UK 7-inch single (1990)

A. "Take My Breath Away" – 4:11
AA. "Danger Zone" (performed by Kenny Loggins) – 3:35

- UK CD single (1990)
1. "Take My Breath Away" – 4:11
2. "Danger Zone" (performed by Kenny Loggins) – 3:35
3. "Hot Summer Nights" (performed by Miami Sound Machine) – 3:34
4. "Top Gun Anthem" (performed by Harold Faltermeyer and Steve Stevens) – 4:02
- UK cassette single (1990)

A1. "Take My Breath Away" – 4:11
A2. "Danger Zone" (performed by Kenny Loggins) – 3:35
B1. "Take My Breath Away" – 4:11
B2. "Danger Zone" (performed by Kenny Loggins) – 3:35

== Charts ==
=== Weekly charts ===
1986 weekly chart performance for "Take My Breath Away"
Chart (1986)	Peak position
Australia (Kent Music Report)	2
Austria (Ö3 Austria Top 40)	4
Belgium (Ultratop 50 Flanders)	1
Canada Retail Singles (The Record)	1
Canada Top Singles (RPM)	2
Canada Adult Contemporary (RPM)	1
Europe (European Hot 100 Singles)	1
Finland (Suomen virallinen lista)	13
France (SNEP)	2
Ireland (IRMA)	1
Italy (Musica e dischi)	5
Netherlands (Dutch Top 40)	1
Netherlands (Single Top 100)	2
New Zealand (Recorded Music NZ)	4
Norway (VG-lista)	4
South Africa (Springbok Radio)	2
Spain (AFYVE)	2
Sweden (Sverigetopplistan)	2
Switzerland (Schweizer Hitparade)	2
UK Singles (Official Charts)	1
US Billboard Hot 100	1
US Adult Contemporary (Billboard)	3
US Cash Box Top 100	1
West Germany (GfK)	3

1988 weekly chart performance for "Take My Breath Away"
Chart (1988)	Peak position
UK Singles (Official Charts)	52

1989 weekly chart performance for "Take My Breath Away"
Chart (1989)	Peak position
Brazil (ABPD)	8

1990 weekly chart performance for "Take My Breath Away"
Chart (1990)	Peak position
Europe (Eurochart Hot 100 Singles)	11
Ireland (IRMA)	7
Luxembourg (Radio Luxembourg)	2
UK Singles (Official Charts)	3
UK Airplay (Music Week)	17

2022 weekly chart performance for "Take My Breath Away"
Chart (2022)	Peak position
New Zealand Hot Singles (RMNZ)	29

=== Year-end charts ===
1986 year-end chart performance for "Take My Breath Away"
Chart (1986)	Position
Australia (Kent Music Report)	6
Belgium (Ultratop 50 Flanders)	7
Canada Top Singles (RPM)	23
Europe (European Hot 100 Singles)	32
Netherlands (Dutch Top 40)	16
Netherlands (Single Top 100)	8
UK Singles (Gallup)	9
US Billboard Hot 100	27
US Adult Contemporary (Billboard)	28
US Cash Box Top 100	21
West Germany (Media Control)	43

1987 year-end chart performance for "Take My Breath Away"
Chart (1987)	Position
Europe (European Hot 100 Singles)	67

1990 year-end chart performance for "Take My Breath Away"
Chart (1990)	Position
UK Singles (Gallup)	37

== Certifications ==
Certifications for "Take My Breath Away"
Region	Certification	Certified units/sales
Canada (Music Canada)	Gold	50,000^{^}
Denmark (IFPI Danmark)	Gold	45,000^{‡}
France (SNEP)	Gold	500,000^{*}
Italy (FIMI) digital sales since 2009	Gold	50,000^{‡}
New Zealand (RMNZ)	2× Platinum	60,000^{‡}
Portugal (AFP)	Gold	30,000
United Kingdom (BPI)	Platinum	600,000^{‡}
United States (RIAA)	Gold	500,000^{^}
^{*} Sales figures based on certification alone.^{^} Shipments figures based on certification alone.^{‡} Sales+streaming figures based on certification alone.

== Jessica Simpson version ==
"Take My Breath Away"

Single by Jessica Simpson

from the album In This Skin (reissue)
- Released: March 8, 2004
- Studio: Turtle Sound (New York City); Steakhouse (Los Angeles)
- Length: 3:15
- Label: Columbia
- Songwriters: Giorgio Moroder; Tom Whitlock
- Producer: Billy Mann

Jessica Simpson singles chronology
"With You" (2003)	"Take My Breath Away" (2004)	"Angels" (2004)

Music video
- "Take My Breath Away" by Jessica Simpson on YouTube

American singer Jessica Simpson covered "Take My Breath Away" and released it as the third single from the album In This Skin in March 2004. Her version was produced by Billy Mann. Simpson chose to cover this song because she thought that it was the theme song of her relationship with her then-husband, Nick Lachey.

=== Commercial performance ===
"Take My Breath Away" reached number 20 on the Billboard Hot 100, as well as the top 10 on the Top 40 Tracks and Top 40 Mainstream charts. On November 7, 2005, the song was certified gold by the Recording Industry Association of America (RIAA).

=== Track listings ===
- Original 2-track release
1. "Take My Breath Away"
2. "Fly"
- Australian CD single
1. "Take My Breath Away"
2. "With You" (acoustic version)
3. "Take My Breath Away" (Eddie Baez Late Night Club Mix)
4. "Take My Breath Away" (Passengerz Hourglass Mix)
5. "Take My Breath Away" (music video)
- Brazilian promotional CD single
1. "Take My Breath Away"
2. "Take My Breath Away" (Eddie Baez Late Night Club Mix)
3. "Take My Breath Away" (Eddie Baez Late Night Dub Mix)
4. "Take My Breath Away" (Passengerz Hourglass Mix)

=== Awards and nominations ===
Year	Award	Category	Work	Result
2004	Teen Choice Awards	Choice Music: Love Song	"Take My Breath Away"	Nominated
2005	People's Choice Awards	Favorite Remake	"Take My Breath Away"	Nominated
2005	Groovevolt Music and Fashion Awards	Best Song Performance – Female	"Take My Breath Away"	Nominated

=== Charts ===
==== Weekly charts ====
Weekly chart performance for "Take My Breath Away"
Chart (2004)	Peak position
Australia (ARIA)	15
Belgium (Ultratop 50 Flanders)	32
Belgium (Ultratop 50 Wallonia)	16
Canada (Nielsen SoundScan)	10
Canada CHR/Pop Top 30 (Radio & Records)	30
France (SNEP)	18
Sweden (Sverigetopplistan)	43
UK Singles (OCC)	159
US Billboard Hot 100	20
US Adult Contemporary (Billboard)	23
US Adult Pop Airplay (Billboard)	29
US Dance Club Songs (Billboard) Eddie Baez and the Passengerz mixes	10
US Pop Airplay (Billboard)	8

==== Year-end charts ====
Year-end chart performance for "Take My Breath Away"
Chart (2004)	Position
Australia (ARIA)	99
Belgium (Ultratop 50 Wallonia)	58
US Adult Top 40 (Billboard)	90
US Mainstream Top 40 (Billboard)	55

=== Certifications and sales ===
Certifications for "Take My Breath Away"
Region	Certification	Certified units/sales
Australia (ARIA)	Gold	35,000^{^}
France	—	44,086
United States (RIAA)	Gold	500,000^{*}
^{*} Sales figures based on certification alone.^{^} Shipments figures based on certification alone.

=== Release history ===
Release dates and formats for "Take My Breath Away"
Region	Date	Format	Label	Ref.
United States	March 8, 2004	Contemporary hit radio	Columbia	
United States	May 25, 2004	CD	Columbia	
Australia	July 12, 2004	CD	Columbia	

== The Shadows version ==
An instrumental version was recorded by The Shadows for their 1991 album Themes & Dreams. As is typical for the group's cover versions, it features Hank Marvin's lead guitar played to the original vocal melody, with considerable note elongation, echo and whammy bar application.

== Petra Janů version ==
A Czech version, titled "Ještě se mi směj" (also known as "Diagnóza láska") was released as a single in 1987 by multiple Zlatý slavík award winner Petra Janů, becoming one of her biggest hits.

== See also ==
- List of Dutch Top 40 number-one singles of 1986
- List of European number-one hits of 1986
- List of number-one singles of 1986 (Ireland)
- List of number-one singles from the 1980s (UK)
- List of Hot 100 number-one singles of 1986 (U.S.)
