= Like Flames =

1986 single by Berlin

Single by Berlin

from the album Count Three & Pray
- B-side: "Hideaway"; "Trash"
- Released: 1986
- Genre: Pop rock; synth-pop
- Length: 5:05
- Label: Geffen
- Songwriter: Rob Brill
- Producer: Bob Ezrin

Berlin singles chronology
"Take My Breath Away" (1986)	"Like Flames" (1986)	"You Don't Know" (1986)

Music video
- "Like Flames" on YouTube

"Like Flames" is a song by American band Berlin, released in 1986 as the second single from their fourth studio album, Count Three & Pray (1986).

== Background ==
Berlin worked with Canadian producer Bob Ezrin on the album. The producer, best known for his work with Alice Cooper and Kiss, gave the record a radically different 1980s pop-rock guitar sound than Berlin's previous releases, which had a more new wave/synth-pop sound. Berlin singer Terri Nunn and their label, Geffen Records, were approving of the change of sound, but it did not sit well with founding member John Crawford and drummer Rob Brill, who wrote the song. The recording of the album wasn't a relaxed affair, as differences of opinion between band members plagued the recording sessions. These clashes were further exacerbated by the recording of the group's previous single, the worldwide number-one single "Take My Breath Away" from the soundtrack of the film Top Gun, which Nunn was eager to record, while the other two members were not excited about due to the song not being written by them (it was written and produced by Giorgio Moroder), and with a sound not representative of the band.

== Music video ==
The music video sees the band singing at the top of a mountain. It was filmed at the Red Rock Canyon, Nevada.

== Release and reception ==
"Like Flames" was released as the second single from the album in October 1986 and, following up "Take My Breath Away", a chart-topper in September of that year, was expected to do well. However, the record and the album did not find chart success, peaking at number 82 in the US and becoming their last chart entry in that country. In Europe, the record performed better on the strength of "Take My Breath Away", reaching the top 20 in several countries, but still it charted moderately. In the UK, "Like Flames" was released as the third single from the album in March 1987, following "You Don't Know", which was released as the next single elsewhere. It peaked at number 47 on the UK Singles Chart.

Nunn has blamed the lack of success to the sudden change of style for the band, which alienated their established fanbase of their synth-pop albums, and failing to gain new fans from their new-found fame with "Take My Breath Away", because the album sounded nothing like it, although the hit song was included on the album at the insistence of Geffen to capitalize on its success. The record's lack of success and their internal clashes eventually led to the demise of the band in 1987.

== Track listings ==
- US and European 7-inch single

A. "Like Flames" (Edit) – 4:02
B. "Hideaway" – 5:08

- UK 7-inch single

A. "Like Flames" (Edit) – 4:02
B. "Trash" – 3:38

- UK 12-inch single

A. "Like Flames" (Extended Version) – 7:00
B1. "Trash" – 3:38
B2. "You Don't Know" (Extended Version) – 5:31

- European 12-inch single

A. "Like Flames" (Extended Version) – 7:00
B1. "Hideaway" – 5:08
B2. "Dancing in Berlin" (Remix) – 4:44

== Charts ==
=== Weekly charts ===
Weekly chart performance for "Like Flames"
Chart (1986–1987)	Peak position
Australia (Kent Music Report)	18
Belgium (Ultratop 50 Flanders)	10
Europe (European Hot 100 Singles)	43
Finland (Suomen virallinen lista)	14
Netherlands (Dutch Top 40)	14
Netherlands (Single Top 100)	17
New Zealand (Recorded Music NZ)	30
UK Singles (OCC)	47
US Billboard Hot 100	82
US Cash Box Top 100 Singles	83
West Germany (GfK)	36

=== Year-end charts ===
Year-end chart performance for "Like Flames"
Chart (1987)	Position
Netherlands (Single Top 100)	94

== Alannah Myles version ==
"Like Flames"

Single by Alannah Myles

from the album Myles & More: The Very Best Of
- Released: November 20, 2000
- Genre: Pop rock; Europop
- Length: 5:14
- Label: Ark 21
- Songwriter: Rob Brill
- Producer: Frank Peterson

Alannah Myles singles chronology
"Break the Silence" (1998)	"Like Flames" (2000)	"Comment Ça Va" (2008)

Canadian singer Alannah Myles covered the song in 2000. The record was produced by German musician and producer Frank Peterson, known for his work with Enigma, Gregorian and Sarah Brightman as a commission by German cable TV Premiere to use the song at the end of their coverages of the Bundesliga on their Sports channel during the 2000–2001 season.

Myles' cover version mixes the standard Europop of that time with her trademark rock vocal delivery. Myles sang it on the Bundesliga playoffs and, since the song received a good response, it was released as a single in Germany in November 2000, peaking at number 98 there, Myles' first single to chart since 1990 in that country. Myles eventually included the song on her compilation Myles & More: The Very Best Of, released in the Spring of 2001. These would be Myles' last releases with her label Ark 21 Records, with whom she had signed in 1996.

Myles would collaborate again with Peterson on his 2010 Gregorian album Dark Side of the Chant, providing vocals on three tracks.

=== Track listing ===
- CD single
1. "Like Flames" (Radio Version) – 3:55
2. "Like Flames" (Album Version) – 5:14
3. "Like Flames" (Deadline Remix) – 5:13

=== Charts ===
Chart performance for "Like Flames"
Chart (2000)	Peak position
Germany (GfK)	98

== Twenty 4 Seven version ==
"Like Flames"

Single by Twenty 4 Seven
- Released: 2007
- Genre: Jumpstyle; hard trance
- Length: 2:58
- Label: Ruud Van Rijen Productions
- Songwriter: Rob Brill
- Producer: Ruud Van Rijen

Twenty 4 Seven singles chronology
"Ne Ne" (1999)	"Like Flames" (2007)	"The Reason" (2012)

Music video
- "Like Flames" on YouTube

"Like Flames" was covered and released as a single by Dutch Eurodance group Twenty 4 Seven in October 2007. It featured Twenty 4 Seven's new vocalist Elle and was the group's first release since 1999.

The music video was shot in an abandoned power plant, and featured Elle singing and dancing with a couple of other dancers, with flames in the background.

=== Charts ===
Chart performance for "Like Flames"
Chart (2008)	Peak position
Netherlands (Single Top 100)	20
