= Count Three & Pray =

Studio album by Berlin
- Released: October 13, 1986
- Studios: One on One (North Hollywood, California); The Village Recorder (West Los Angeles, California); Producers I and II (Hollywood, California); Amigo (North Hollywood, California); The Manor (Shipton-on-Cherwell, England) (Note: "You Don't Know" and "Sex Me, Talk Me"); AIR (London, England)
- Genres: New wave; dance-rock; synth-pop
- Length: 46:44
- Label: Geffen
- Producers: Bob Ezrin; Berlin; Andy Richards; Giorgio Moroder

Berlin chronology
Love Life (1984)	Count Three & Pray (1986)	Voyeur (2002)

Singles from Count Three & Pray
- 1. "Take My Breath Away" Released: June 1986; 2. "Like Flames" Released: October 1986; 3. "You Don't Know" Released: December 1986

Professional ratings
Review scores
Source	Rating
AllMusic	4/5 stars
Record Mirror	1/5 stars
Smash Hits	5/10
Sounds	3.5/5 stars

Count Three & Pray is the fourth studio album by American new wave band Berlin, released on October 13, 1986, by Geffen Records. The album spawned three singles, including "Take My Breath Away", which was featured in the film Top Gun. The single topped the Billboard Hot 100 and won the Academy Award for Best Original Song in 1986.

== Track listing ==
All tracks are written by John Crawford, except where noted. All tracks are produced by Bob Ezrin, except where noted.

No.	Title	Writer(s)	Producer(s)	Length
1.	"Will I Ever Understand You"			4:40
2.	"You Don't Know"		Andy Richards; Ezrin; Berlin	4:22
3.	"Like Flames"	Rob Brill		5:05
4.	"Heartstrings"	Crawford; Terri Nunn; Brill; Matt Reid		4:12
5.	"Take My Breath Away"	Giorgio Moroder; Tom Whitlock	Moroder	4:11
6.	"Trash"		Berlin; Ezrin	3:38
7.	"When Love Goes to War"	Brian Fairweather		4:09
8.	"Hideaway"	Crawford; Chas Sanford	Berlin	5:08
9.	"Sex Me, Talk Me"		Richards; Ezrin; Berlin	4:41
10.	"Pink and Velvet"	Ric Olsen; Nunn		6:38

== Personnel ==
Credits adapted from the liner notes of Count Three & Pray.

=== Berlin ===
- John Crawford – bass, background vocals
- Terri Nunn – vocals
- Rob Brill – drums, background vocals

=== Additional musicians ===
- Gene Black, Kane Roberts, David Gilmour, Ted Nugent, Alan Murphy, Elliot Easton, Steve Dougherty, Gregg Wright – guitars
- Bob Ezrin, Peter Robinson, Greg Kuehn, Jun Sato – keyboards
- Gary Barlough – Synclavier programming
- Andy Richards – keyboards programming, keyboards (tracks 2, 9)
- John Batdorf, William Batstone, Lance Ellington, George Merrill, Tessa Niles, The Art Damage Choir – background vocals
- Richard Niles – orchestration (track 9)
- Luís Jardim – percussion (track 9)
- Patrick O'Hearn – fretless bass (track 10)
- Masakazu Yoshizawa – shakuhachi (track 2)
- Osamu Kitajima – koto, biwa (track 2)

=== Technical ===
- Bob Ezrin – production (tracks 1–4, 6, 7, 9, 10); recording (tracks 1, 3–8, 10); mixing (tracks 1, 2, 6–8, 10)
- Berlin – production (tracks 2, 6, 8, 9)
- Andy Richards – production (tracks 2, 9)
- Giorgio Moroder – production, mixing (track 5)
- David Tickle – recording (tracks 1, 3, 4, 6–8, 10); mixing (tracks 1, 6–8, 10)
- Ted Hayton – recording (tracks 2, 9)
- Brian Reeves – mixing (track 5)
- Mike Shipley – mixing (tracks 3, 4, 9)
- Russ Castillo, Steve Strassman, Peter Lewis, Bob Mithoff, Dave Concors, Michael Rosen, Tom Whitlock – additional recording
- Jeff Bennett, Tom Nist, Charlie Brocco, Robin Laine, Paul Gomersall, Steve Lyon – recording assistance
- Stephen Marcussen – mastering at Precision Lacquer (Hollywood)

=== Artwork ===
- Dean Chamberlain – front cover photo
- PWR, Matthew Rolston, Middelkoop, Rob Nunn – other photos
- Janet Levinson – design

== Charts ==
Chart performance for Count Three & Pray
Chart (1986–1987)	Peak position
Australian Albums (Kent Music Report)	38
Canada Top Albums/CDs (RPM)	85
Dutch Albums (Album Top 100)	29
European Albums (Music & Media)	44
Finnish Albums (Suomen virallinen lista)	26
German Albums (Offizielle Top 100)	61
New Zealand Albums (RMNZ)	20
Swedish Albums (Sverigetopplistan)	40
UK Albums (Official Charts)	32
US Billboard 200	61

== Certifications ==
Certifications for Count Three & Pray
Region	Certification	Certified units/sales
United Kingdom (BPI)	Silver	60,000^{^}
^{^} Shipments figures based on certification alone.
