= You Don't Know (Berlin song) =

Single by Berlin

from the album Count Three & Pray
- B-side: "Trash"; "Hideaway" (UK)
- Released: December 1986
- Length: 4:28 (album version); 3:18 (single version); 5:31 (extended remix)
- Label: Mercury; Geffen (North America)
- Songwriter(s): John Crawford
- Producer(s): Andy Richards; Bob Ezrin; Berlin

Berlin singles chronology
"Like Flames" (1986)	"You Don't Know" (1986)	"Pink and Velvet" (1986)

"You Don't Know" is a song by American band Berlin, released in 1986 as the third single from their fourth studio album, Count Three & Pray. It was written by John Crawford and produced by Andy Richards, Bob Ezrin and Berlin. It reached No. 39 in the UK and No. 16 in Belgium.

"You Don't Know" was recorded in London. Recalling the initial recording of Count Three & Pray, Nunn said in a 2014 interview for Pop Entertainment: "It was so bad with this guy in England that we trashed the whole thing. I think we kept one song, "You Don't Know," that he had done. We started all over with Bob Ezrin."

A music video was filmed to promote the single, which gained breakout rotation on MTV.

== Critical reception ==
Upon its release, Cash Box commented: "A cool, atmospheric treatment shows the musical growth of former synth-pop pioneers. The haunting melody and non-conforming arrangement form a bracing contrast to Terri Nunn's sultry, passionate vocal." Vici MacDonald of Smash Hits described the song as "really quite good" and added: "A screechy guitar and a wailsome woman echo distantly over a foreboding, rolling drumbeat and the whole thing's massive, mysterious and foggy".

== Track listing ==
7-inch single

1. "You Don't Know" (edit) – 3:18
2. "Trash" – 3:38

7-inch single (UK release)

1. "You Don't Know" – 3:18
2. "Hideaway" – 5:00

7-inch single (Japanese release)

1. "You Don't Know" – 4:27
2. "Trash" – 3:38

12-inch single (UK release)

1. "You Don't Know" – 4:26
2. "Hideaway" – 5:08
3. "Dancing in Berlin" (remix) – 4:44

12-inch single (UK two vinyl gatefold release)

1. "You Don't Know" – 4:26
2. "Hideaway" – 5:08
3. "Dancing in Berlin" (remix) – 4:44
4. "No More Words" (dance remix) – 5:44
5. "Will I Ever Understand You" – 4:40

12-inch single (European release)

1. "You Don't Know" (extended remix)" – 5:31
2. "Trash" – 3:38
3. "You Don't Know" (7" version) – 3:30

== Personnel ==
Berlin

- Terri Nunn – vocals
- John Crawford – bass, background vocals
- Rob Brill – drums, background vocals

Additional musicians

- Masakazu Yoshizawa – shakuhachi on "You Don't Know"
- Osamu Kitajima – koto and biwa on "You Don't Know"
- Andy Richards – keyboards and keyboard programming on "You Don't Know"

Production

- Andy Richards – producer on "You Don't Know"
- Bob Ezrin – producer on "You Don't Know", "Trash" and "Will I Ever Understand You"
- Terri Nunn – producer on "You Don't Know", "Trash" and "Hideaway"
- John Crawford – producer on "You Don't Know", "Trash" and "Hideaway"
- Rob Brill – producer on "You Don't Know", "Trash" and "Hideaway"
- Ted Hayton – recording of "You Don't Know"

Other

- Lara Rossignol – photography (US sleeve)

== Charts ==
Chart (1987)	Peak position
Belgium (Ultratop 50 Flanders)	16
Ireland (IRMA)	29
UK Singles (OCC)	39
