= Radar Radio =

Single by Giorgio Moroder featuring Joe Pizzulo
- A-side: "Take My Breath Away" by Berlin
- Released: 1986
- Recorded: 1986
- Genre: New wave, pop
- Label: Columbia
- Songwriter(s): Giorgio Moroder, Tom Whitlock
- Producer(s): Giorgio Moroder

"Radar Radio" is a single performed by Giorgio Moroder featuring Joe Pizzulo and written by Giorgio Moroder and Tom Whitlock. It was featured in the film Top Gun. The song was released in 1986 as a B-side to the hit split single that featured Berlin's "Take My Breath Away" on the A-side (which won the Academy Award for Best Original Song as well as the Golden Globe Award for Best Original Song in 1987). "Radar Radio" has not been included on any of the Top Gun soundtracks issued to date, making the vinyl single the only release. Until March 2024, the song had never been released on CD and cassette. At the start of March 2024, La-La Land Records, a specialist label that re-releases limited editions of film and television soundtracks, announced the imminent release of a double CD set (limited to 5000 units) featuring Harold Faltermeyer's original score in its entirety along with bonus cuts with the second disc containing the classic soundtrack album plus additional songs that were released on the expanded edition of the soundtrack and, for the first time ever, "Radar Radio".

== Usage in Top Gun ==
In the film Top Gun, the song is heard playing on a jukebox at a bar during the last scene of the film as Tom Cruise's character has a drink. Only a few seconds of the song are heard before "You've Lost That Lovin' Feelin'" starts playing from the jukebox.
