= The Big F =

American rock band

- Origin: Los Angeles, California, U.S.
- Genres: Hard rock; heavy metal; alternative rock; alternative metal
- Years active: 1988–1995
- Labels: Elektra; Chrysalis
- Spinoff of: Berlin
- Past members: John Crawford; Rob Brill; Mark Christian; Sheldon "Algazzam" Gomberg
- Website: Official Facebook page

The Big F was an American rock band that was formed in Los Angeles, California, in 1988, by guitarist Mark Christian and former members of Berlin, bassist and vocalist John Crawford and drummer Rob Brill.

== History ==
The Big F was formed in 1988 by John Crawford and Rob Brill after their previous band Berlin broke up. They were joined by guitarist Mark Christian, and later found themselves signed to Elektra Records, which released their self-titled debut album in 1989. Although the album failed to chart and received mixed reviews by music critics, it was supported by the singles "Kill the Cowboy" and "Doctor Vine", both of which received considerable airplay on MTV's Headbangers Ball and 120 Minutes as well as the Long Beach radio station KNAC.

Although The Big F never broke into the mainstream, they did establish a following within the underground music community, opening for such bands as Bad Religion, Soundgarden, Voivod, T.S.O.L. and many others. In 1992, Chrysalis Records signed The Big F and released their second album Is the following year. Despite receiving rave reviews, Is did not sell as well as expected, and The Big F soon broke up, due to internal tensions between band members.

After the breakup, guitarist Mark Christian would team up with bassist Kinley "Barney" Wolfe (Lord Tracy, The Cult) in the short-lived band Milk The Cow who released their sole self-titled effort in 1996.

== Discography ==
=== Studio albums ===
- The Big F (1989)
- Is (1993)

=== Singles ===
- "Kill the Cowboy" (1989)
- "Doctor Vine" (1990)
- "Patience Peregrine" (1993)
