= Gregg Wright =

- Genres: Blues, rock
- Occupation: Musician
- Instrument: Guitar
- Years active: 1970s - present
- Labels: RCS Records, The Record Company of the South, Quality, Left Hook Records
- Formerly of: Gregg Wright & Light Years, Gregg Wright's Left Hook, Mick Fleetwood's Zoo

Gregg Wright is an American blues and rock guitarist. He has played with an assortment of major artists that include Spencer Davis, The Gap Band, Rosa Lee Brooks, The Jacksons, and Mick Fleetwood.

== Background ==
Gregg Wright is from Monroe, Louisiana. He acquired his first guitar while attending junior high school in Wichita Falls, Texas.

Wright began his professional career in the mid-1970s playing the U.S. Southern circuit after playing with local bands around the Washington DC area during his time in high school. He played at the New Orleans Jazz Festival in 1979 and was voted Best Guitarist in the Louisiana Music Poll that same year. He moved to Los Angeles in the early 1980s and then toured and played with major US acts.

Wright has received the following awards, the Albert King Lifetime Award and the City of Los Angeles Living Legend Blues Award. He is also a member of the Louisiana Music Hall of Fame. Some of the artists that he has opened have been Albert King and Freddie King. He has also worked with The Gap Band, Berlin, Spencer Davis and Michael Jackson.

== Career ==
In 1977 at the helm of his group Gregg Wright & Light Years, he released the single, "So Hot" bw "Searching for Love" on RCS 002. It was reviewed in the 10 December issue of Cash Box, where it was one of the "Singles to Watch". The reviewer wrote that it had a syncopated riff that emphasized a clean edged thick heavily distorted guitar sound. The reviewer also wrote that FM stations may find the single fascinating due to that the vocal and instrumental phrasing that was very much in the Hendrix spirit.

Wright had his solo LP, Khamsin that was issued on The Record Company of the South label, cat no. RCS A 1001 in 1978.

On 5 October 1985, he appeared at the third annual L. A Guitar Show with Phil Upchurch and the LA based group, the Blues for Breakfast band.

Gregg Wright & the Heat were booked to appear at the L.A. Guitar Show on Sunday 4 October 1986. Hard Report published in its 20 May 1988 issue that Wright's Wake Up Call album was to be released in June, which they labeled as his "first major solo album". They said that the album would feature Aynsley Dunbar on drums and a cover of Deep Purple's "Hush".

Wright was a member of Mick Fleetwood's group Zoo. Besides himself on guitar, the line up consisted of Mick Fleetwood on drums, Bekka Bramlett on vocals, Billy Thorpe on guitar, Brett Tuggle on Keyboards and Tom Lily on bass. According to the 21 March 1992 issue of Billboard, the band had been signed to Capricorn Records and there were plans for their debut album to be issued in May that year.

In 1995, Wright's band, Gregg Wright's Left Hook released the Round One album. Besides Wright on guitar and vocals, the participating musicians were, Mick Broadbent on bass and backing vocals, and Keith Line on drums, percussion and backing vocals. The tracks on the album were, "Drivin' to New Orleans", "Heidi Ann", "Between Heaven and Hell", "....Or Die Trying", "Saturday Night" and Crank It Up !!!". On track six, "Crank It Up !!!, the musicians were Aynsley Dunbar on drums and Karl Rucker on bass, and the backing vocalists were, Paul (Pablo) Campbell, Bekka Bramlett, Heidi Salas, and Brett Tuggle.

On 27 July 2018, Gregg Wright and Hollee Thee Maxwell were guests with Rosa Lee Brooks and the Brooks Project Band at The Mixx in Pasadena.

Wright recorded his Big Dawg Barkin' which was released in late 2022. He was interviewed by Oscar Jordan of Vintage Guitar Magazine in 2022, where he discussed the recording of his album Big Dawg Barkin'.

On 19 May 2023, Wright headlined at the "City of Lake Charles Downtown at Sundown" concert series.

The Big Dawg Barkin’ album was reviewed by Pete Feenstra of Get Ready to Rock!. The review which was posted on 25 September 2023 was positive with five stars given. Feenstra said that the album was a timely reminder of a hugely underrated talent, and finishing off with "Gregg Wright is THE ‘Big Dawg Barkin’ and his bark is as loud as his bite".

== Discography ==
Singles
| Act | Release | Catalogue | Year | Notes # |
|---|---|---|---|---|
| Gregg Wright & Light Years | "So Hot" / "Searching for Love" | The Record Company of the South 001 / 002 | 1977 | |
| Gregg Wright | "What’s Your Name (Sweet Thing)" / "Highway Traveler" | RCS Records 1003 | | |

Albums
| Release | Catalogue | Year | Notes # |
|---|---|---|---|
| Khamsin | The Record Company of the South – RCS A 1001 | 1978 | |
| Wake Up Call | | 1988 | Self-released |
| World Rock | Quality CDL-19102-2 | 1992 | |
| Lightning Strike | Left Hook Records LH-002 | 2002 | |
| King of the Rockin' Blues! | Left Hook Records LH-003 | 2009 | |
| Big Dawg Barkin' | Left Hook Records | 2022 | |

== Interviews ==
- Chanty and Lynx- Muses Podcast channel, Nov 28, 2020 - Rosa Lee Brooks and Gregg Wright on Muses Podcast (video)
- Ground Zero Blues Club Biloxi channel, Mar 7, 2023 - Gregg Wright on the Green Room Podcast @groundzerobluesclubbiloxi (video)
- Vintage Guitar, 4 Jan 2023 - Gregg Wright The Shackles Are Off - Oscar Jordan
