= Dancing in Berlin =

Single by Berlin

from the album Love Life
- B-side: "Lost in the Crowd"; "Pictures of You" (US/Canada)
- Released: August 1984
- Genre: Dance
- Length: 4:02
- Label: Mercury; Geffen (North America)
- Songwriter(s): John Crawford
- Producer(s): Giorgio Moroder, Richie Zito

Berlin singles chronology
"Now It's My Turn" (1984)	"Dancing in Berlin" (1984)	"Touch" (1984)

"Dancing in Berlin" is a song by American band Berlin, which was released in 1984 as the third single from their third studio album Love Life. It was written by John Crawford and produced by Giorgio Moroder and Richie Zito. It reached No. 12 in New Zealand and No. 39 in Australia.

== Critical reception ==
Upon release, Billboard included the song as a recommended single under the "Pop" section. The Absolute Sound described the song as one of the best from Love Life. In a retrospective review of the album, Mike DeGagne of AllMusic commented that the song "emulates the same streamline formula of sharp keyboards and an animated dance pace" of "No More Words".

== Track listing ==
7" single

1. "Dancing in Berlin" - 4:02
2. "Lost in the Crowd" - 4:38

7" single (US/Canada release)

1. "Dancing in Berlin" - 4:04
2. "Pictures of You" - 4:34

7" single (US promo)

1. "Dancing in Berlin" - 4:04
2. "Dancing in Berlin" - 4:04

12" single

1. "Dancing In Berlin (Dance Remix)" - 5:16
2. "Lost in the Crowd" - 4:38

== Chart performance ==
Chart (1984)	Peak position
Australian Singles Chart	39
New Zealand Singles Chart	12

== Personnel ==
Berlin

- Terri Nunn – vocals
- Ric Olsen – guitar
- David Diamond – synthesizers, backing vocals
- Matt Reid – synthesizers
- John Crawford – bass, backing vocals
- Rob Brill – drums

Production

- Giorgio Moroder, Richie Zito - producers of "Dancing in Berlin"
- Mike Howlett - producer of "Lost in the Crowd" and "Pictures of You"
