= Cultural News =

The Cultural News is a Los Angeles-based English language publication about traditional and contemporary Japanese culture. It is a monthly tabloid newspaper format with eight pages.

== Markets served ==
Los Angeles has the largest Japanese expatriate population in the world and in the U.S. Los Angeles is the most popular destination for performing artists from Japan to the U.S. As a result, Los Angeles is full of Japanese cultural events throughout the year.

In order to bring cultural information to Japanese communities and American enthusiasts of Japanese culture, Cultural News prints 6,000 copies monthly and distributes to more than ten Japanese cultural centers in Southern California, Little Tokyo and Downtown Los Angeles.

Ambassador Ryozo Kato to the U.S.A (October 2001-May 2008) praised Cultural News in his letter dated on February 27, 2006, as following:

Thank you for letting me read a copy of Cultural News. I was impressed to see that it explains Japanese culture clearly, and includes a variety of articles that would appeal to wide range of readers. I am quite inspired and grateful of your determination to introduce Japanese culture to many people and play a great role in the cultural exchange between our countries.

== History ==
Cultural News was started in 1998 by Shige Higashi in Los Angeles with a help of a friend from Japan. From 1999 to 2001, Cultural News was published once every two months while Shige worked as a translator in a Japanese travel company.

After the September 11 Attack took place in 2001, Shige lost his job because the Japanese travel industry in Los Angeles was totally devastated. However, his friends raised $8,000 to support Shige’s effort.

With this $8,000 as the capital, Cultural News, Inc. was incorporated by Shige in June 2002. Since January 2002, Cultural News has been published every month continuously.

== Business structure and financing ==
Even though Cultural News, Inc. is a corporation, Cultural News is basically Shige’s “one man show.” Shige is publisher, editor, advertisement sales, accountant, bookkeeper and deliver boy. Page layout and some editorial works are done outside but paid very little.

The Approximate $50,000 annual budget is covered by subscriptions, advertisements and donations from individuals in the U.S. and Japan.
