= Voyeur (Berlin album) =

Studio album by Berlin
- Released: August 20, 2002
- Genre: Synth-pop, industrial rock, trip hop
- Length: 53:44
- Label: iMUSIC
- Producer: Mitchell Sigman (tracks 1–3, 5–7, 9–10), Peter Rafelson (tracks 4, 8, 11); Chris Olivas (track 10)

Berlin chronology
Live: Sacred and Profane (2000)	Voyeur (2002)	4Play (2005)

Voyeur is the fifth studio album from the American new wave band Berlin, released in 2002 by iMUSIC. It was the band's first studio album since 1986's Count Three & Pray, with singer Terri Nunn as the only original member of the new line-up.

== Background ==
Following the release of Count Three & Pray, the original Berlin split in 1987, but was revived by Nunn with a new line-up in 1998. With the arrival of new member Mitchell Sigman in 2000, Berlin began recording Voyeur in 2001. Originally, Nunn had planned to independently release an EP of new material, however the band then signed with iMUSIC who requested a full album. Speaking of the album's sound to Billboard, iMUSIC vice chairman commented: "It does not sound like an early-80s band trying to make a comeback. We heard the music and [believed] it was relevant and contemporary."

Voyeur was released in August 2002. To promote the album, iMUSIC focused on using the internet to "re-establish links with longtime fans while cultivating a new audience". Berlin embarked on a press and radio tour in September, followed by a series of live concert dates. In 2003, "With a Touch" was released as a promotional single in the US. In mid-2003, Voyeur reached No. 33 on the CMJ New Music Report's RPM Chart, based on the airplay it had gained.

== Critical reception ==
Professional ratings
Review scores
Source	Rating
Billboard	favorable
Curve	favorable
PopMatters	favorable

Upon release, Billboard described the album as a "continuation of its 1980s synth-hewn, new-wave beginnings" and a "welcome return", adding: "The group picks up its dance roots and signature vocals throughout Voyeur, particularly on such tracks as "Blink of an Eye" and "Drug"." Will Harris of PopMatters commented Voyeur "could well be the best work they've ever produced". He added: "The dance influences remain on Voyeur; in fact, the first two tracks, "Blink of an Eye" and "Shiny", are both potential floor-fillers." Curve described the album as "a mutation of Nunn's "No More Words" — steady pop vocals, a deeper edge to catch up with the times, and a multitude of layers: plugged-in guitar, dance-mix sequences and thick harmonies."

== Track listing ==
No.	Title	Writer(s)	Length
1.	"Blink of an Eye"	Roger Gisborne, Mitchell Sigman	4:15
2.	"Shiny"	Gisborne, Sigman, Terri Nunn	4:42
3.	"Lost My Mind"	Nunn, Sigman	4:15
4.	"The World is Waiting"	Nunn, Peter Rafelson	4:51
5.	"Drug"	Nunn, Sigman, Smith, Peterson	4:49
6.	"Sacred and Profane"	Nunn, Sigman, Billy Corgan	4:03
7.	"All I Ever Need"	Nunn, Sigman	3:38
8.	"With a Touch"	Nunn, Rafelson	4:35
9.	"To a King"	Nunn, Chris Olivas, Sigman	4:36
10.	"Stranger on the Bus"	Nunn, Sigman, Rafelson	4:19
11.	"Stronger than Steel" (includes the hidden track "Pleasure Victim (Acoustic - Live)", written by John Crawford)	Nunn, Sigman, Rafelson	9:41

== Personnel ==
Berlin

- Terri Nunn - vocals
- Mitchell Sigman - keyboards, guitars, bass, vocals, programming
- Dallan Baumgarten - guitars
- Chris Olivas - drums and percussion (all tracks), keyboards, programming and vocals (track 10)
- Linda Dalziel - vocals

Additional personnel

- Peter Rafelson - background vocals and all music tracks (tracks 4, 8, 11)
- "The Section" - strings (track 3)
- Richard Dodd - cello (track 3)
- Eric Gorfain - violin (track 3)
- Lance Morrison - bass (tracks 5, 9)
- Joaquin, Kevin Coleman, Roger Gisborne - additional backing vocals (track 1)

Production

- Mitchell Sigman - producer, engineer and mixing (tracks 1, 3, 5–7, 9–10)
- Peter Rafelson - producer and engineer (tracks 4, 8, 11), mixing (track 4)
- Chris Olivas - producer and engineer (track 10)
- David Batiste - assistant engineer
- Jeff Moleski - live drums engineer
- Preston Boebel - live piano engineer
- Pete Lorimer - mixing (tracks 2, 8, 11)
- Terri Nunn - executive producer
- Tom Baker - mastering

Other

- Steve Gerdes - art direction
- Dean Buckley - design
- Jeff Gros - photographer
- Mac Miller - hair
- Tom Osborn - A&R
- Mitch Okmin, The MOB Agency - management
