= Tom Whitlock =

American songwriter (1954–2023)

Thomas Ross Whitlock

Background information
- Born: February 20, 1954; Springfield, Missouri, U.S.
- Died: February 18, 2023 (aged 68) Nashville, Tennessee, U.S.
- Occupation: Songwriter

Thomas Ross Whitlock (February 20, 1954 – February 18, 2023) was an American songwriter, best known for co-writing the Academy Award– and Golden Globe–winning song "Take My Breath Away", performed by Berlin from the film Top Gun, with Giorgio Moroder. He wrote the lyrics for another song for the film, "Danger Zone", performed by Kenny Loggins.

== Career ==
Whitlock was born and raised in Springfield, Missouri. Many famous musicians visited the city as it hosted the television show Ozark Jubilee, influencing Whitlock to play drums. Soon, he was a session musician working with notable composers like Wayne Carson, as well as a drummer for live bands. At the age of 15, Whitlock began writing songs at the piano. During his high school years at Glendale High School, in Springfield, Missouri, he divided his time between studying during the day and playing drums with rock bands on the weekends throughout the Midwest. He entered Drury University in 1971 to major in music. The university honored him as one of its Distinguished Alumni in 1998, and with an honorary doctorate in music the following year.

In 1983, Whitlock travelled to Los Angeles, California, planning to start a band there. While helping his friend Dave Concors at the now defunct studio Davlen Sound Studios, Whitlock met famed composer Giorgio Moroder as he complained about brake defects in his Ferrari. Whitlock purchased some cans of brake fluid and proceeded to fix Moroder's car. Moroder eventually hired Whitlock for work at his studio. In the meantime, he studied recording with Moroder's engineer Brian Reeves, given the studio was busy with films such as Scarface, Flashdance and Beverly Hills Cop, and wrote his own songs. Prior to the production of the Top Gun soundtrack, Moroder found his songwriting partners Keith Forsey and Pete Bellotte unavailable, and knowing Whitlock was a lyricist invited him for the project. Whitlock and Moroder co-wrote five songs for Top Gun including "Take My Breath Away" and the Kenny Loggins hit "Danger Zone". ASCAP shows 113 songs registered, performed by artists such as Berlin, Bonnie Tyler, Jennifer Rush, Michael McDonald, Ray Charles, Graham Nash, Falco, Diana Ross, Teddy Pendergrass, Roger Daltrey, and John Entwistle.

Whitlock and Moroder had other collaborations, for the films Over the Top, American Anthem and Rambo III, and also co-wrote the official theme songs for both the 1988 Summer Olympics ("Hand In Hand") and the 1990 FIFA World Cup ("To Be Number One").

In 2012, the Library of Congress honored Whitlock for his songwriting contributions. Whitlock was also drummer of the Missouri band, The Dog People, with Michael Granda (aka Supe Dujour), Jim Wunderle, and Terry Wilson.

== Death ==
Whitlock died from complications of Alzheimer's disease in Nashville, Tennessee, on February 18, 2023, at the age of 68.

== Filmography of songs ==
- Top Gun (1986) ("Take My Breath Away", performed by Berlin; "Danger Zone", by Kenny Loggins; "Radar Radio" by Giorgio Moroder featuring Joe Pizzulo; "Lead Me On" by Teena Marie; "Through the Fire" by Larry Greene, all co-written by Giorgio Moroder)
- American Anthem (1986) ("Wings to Fly", performed by Graham Nash, co-written by Giorgio Moroder)
- Over the Top (1987) ("Winner Takes It All" by Sammy Hagar; "Meet Me Half Way" by Kenny Loggins; "In This Country" by Robin Zander; "Take It Higher" and "Mind Over Matter" by Larry Greene; "All I Need Is You" by Big Trouble; "Gypsy Soul" by Asia; "I Will Be Strong" by Eddie Money; all co-written by Giorgio Moroder)
- Revenge of the Nerds II: Nerds in Paradise (1987) ("Nightlife" and "Overdrive", both performed by Larry Lee and co-written by Larry Lee and Steve Bates)
- Beverly Hills Cop II (1987) ("All Revved Up", performed Jermaine Jackson and co-written by Giorgio Moroder
- Fatal Beauty (1987) ("Criminal", performed by Shannon; co-written by Sylvester Levay)
- Dream a Little Dream (1989) ("Whenever There's a Night", by Mike Reno; "Never Turn Away", by Chris Thompson; both co-written by John William Dexter)
- Let It Ride (1989) ("Money Talks", "Win or Lose")
- Navy SEALs (1990) (writer: "Strike Like Lightning", "Shadows")
- Fire, Ice and Dynamite (1990) ("Rock Noon", by Dominoe, co-written by Harold Faltermeyer and Brian Reeves; "Get Ready", by Rockafella, co-written by Faltermeyer)
- Out for Justice (1991) ("Temptation", by Teresa James; co-written by Todd Smallwood)
- Boris and Natasha (1992) ("I Want It All", by Marietta, co-written by David Darling)
- 10 Things I Hate About You (1999) ("Even Angels Fall", by Jessica Riddle)
