= Masakazu Yoshizawa =

Japanese flautist (1950–2007)

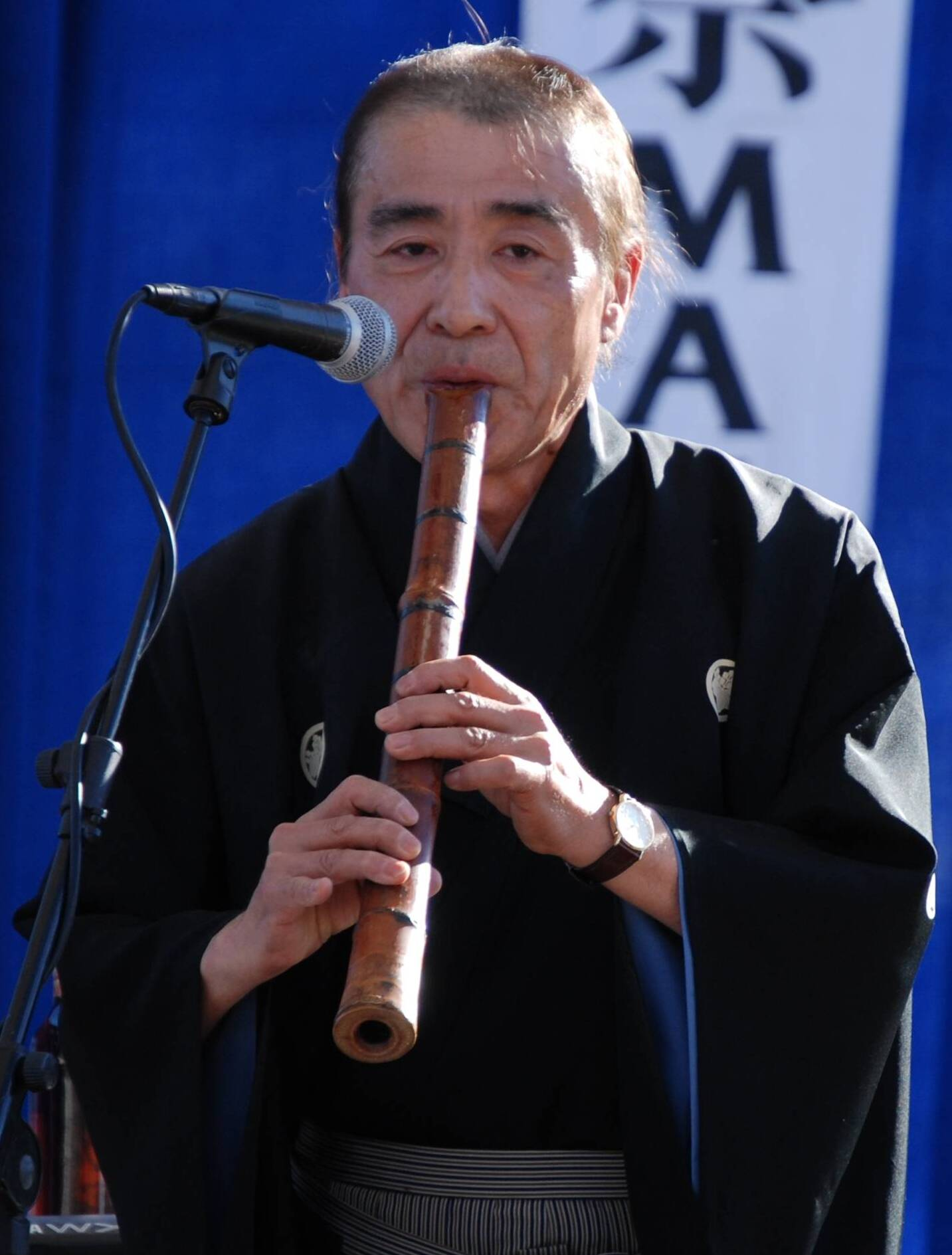
- Yoshizawa performing in 2007

Background information
- Born: September 10, 1950
- Origin: Hida, Gifu, Japan
- Died: October 24, 2007 (aged 57)
- Instrument: Shakuhachi
- Formerly of: Kokin Gumi

Masakazu Yoshizawa (吉沢 政和; September 10, 1950 – October 24, 2007) was a Japanese American flutist and musician known for his mastery of the bamboo flute, specifically the shakuhachi. Yoshizawa also mastered several other traditional Japanese flutes, in addition to other Japanese and Western musical instruments. He was also considered a scholar of ancient and modern Japanese traditional music. Yoshizawa's work and music were featured in a number of major Hollywood studio films and soundtracks, including The Joy Luck Club and Memoirs of a Geisha.

== Early life ==
Masakazu Yoshizawa was born on September 10, 1950, in Hida, Gifu, Japan. His mother was the only obstetrician in their village and his father was a veterinarian. Yoshizawa was required to play a musical instrument in his elementary school. He began playing the accordion when he was 9 years old, and soon moved to the piano, several woodwinds and the shakuhachi, which he was to become world-famous for playing.

He soon became a proficient musician, especially with the shakuhachi. Yoshizawa began playing as both a studio musician and in orchestras in Tokyo by the age of 19. He studied Western music at the Tokyo National University of Fine Arts and Music, where he earned a degree in the early 1970s.

== Career ==
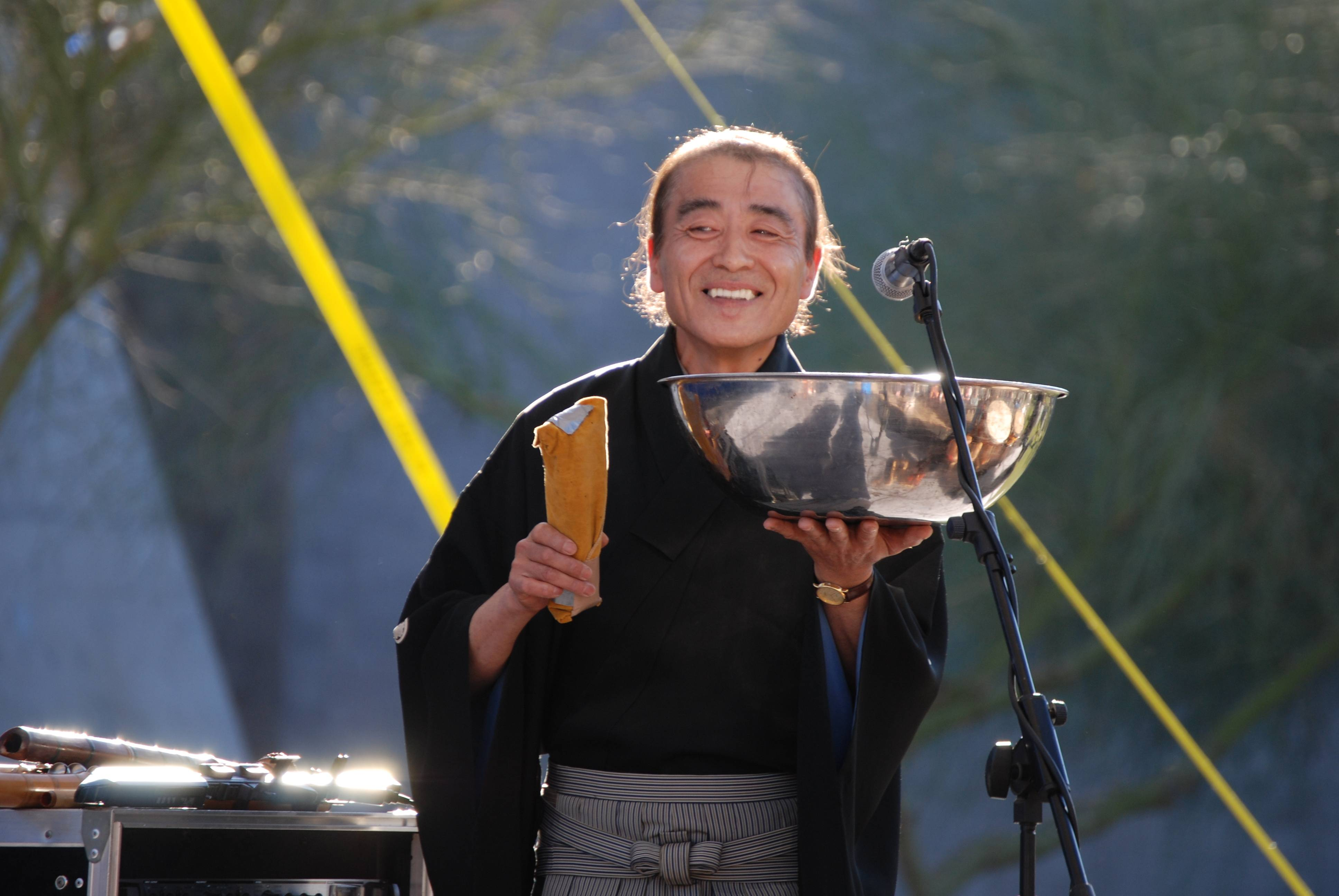
Yoshizawa in 2007

Yoshizawa moved from Japan to Los Angeles in the mid-1970s. He initially worked as a musician, often as a clarinet and saxophone player. He also worked as a sushi chef. However, when he was specifically requested to play the shakuhachi for a certain job, it sparked his interest in the instrument, as well as in Japanese music.

Yoshizawa returned to Japan to take shakuhachi lessons before moving back to California. He began to be hired as a shakuhachi player for film and television, which quickly converted his passion for Japanese music into a full-fledged career. Yoshizawa explained the interest that film and television producers had in his music in a 2005 interview with the Cultural News, a web site that focuses on Japan-themed films: "they wanted a sound that Western music didn't have . . . that was new and fit the film."

Yoshizawa ultimately played the shakuhachi on dozens of different movies and television shows. His early movie credits included the Karate Kid sequels and the 1993 film Dragon: The Bruce Lee Story.

Yoshizawa began his collaboration with acclaimed film composer John Williams on Steven Spielberg's 1993 blockbuster, Jurassic Park. He once told the Cultural News web site that Williams asked him to play the shakuhachi for Jurassic Park because the instrument "sounds like a dinosaur's cry."

Masakazu Yoshizawa would next work with John Williams again in the film version of Memoirs of a Geisha, which was released in 2005. Yoshizawa was initially hired for the movie as a drummer for the Memoirs of a Geisha soundtrack, but was soon asked to play the shakuhachi and other traditional instruments for the film instead. The soundtrack for the movie was expanded by Williams into a concert suite which featured Yoshizawa on the shakuhachi and Yo-Yo Ma on the cello. It was performed by the musicians at the Tanglewood Music Festival in Massachusetts in 2006.

=== Kokin Gumi ===
Kokin Gumi are a music collaboration using a combination of Western and Eastern styles aiming to create music to stimulate the mind. The name derives from "Ko", meaning traditional, "kin", meaning contemporary and "Gumi", meaning group. All of the music was written by Yoshizawa. The group was made up of him, Tateo Takahashi, Hirome Hashibe, Daniel May and Jimmy Brandmeier. However, it ceased with Yoshizawa's death.

== Death ==
Masakazu Yoshizawa died at his home in San Gabriel, California, of stomach cancer on October 24, 2007. He was survived by his daughter, Chrissy Tama Yoshizawa (then, Chrissy Tama Langley and now, Chrissy Yoshizawa Wirt); his son, James Naoki Yoshizawa; his sister, Chieko and his granddaughter, Cassandra Marie Langley. He was a divorcee.

John Williams released a statement to the Los Angeles Times following Yoshizawa's death: "Masa was a brilliant musician and a very important member of the orchestra, and he will be greatly missed."

== See also ==
- Kokin Gumi
