= Pleasure Victim =

1982 studio album by Berlin

Studio album by Berlin
- Released: October 1982
- Recorded: 1982
- Genre: Synth-pop
- Length: 29:07
- Labels: M.A.O.; Enigma
- Producers: Daniel R. Van Patten; The Maomen

Berlin chronology
Information (1980)	Pleasure Victim (1982)	Love Life (1984)

Singles from Pleasure Victim
- 1. "Pleasure Victim" Released: 1982; 2. "Sex (I'm a ...)" Released: February 1983; 3. "The Metro" Released: April 1983; 4. "Masquerade" Released: September 1983

Pleasure Victim is the second studio album by American new wave band Berlin. It was originally recorded in 1982 and released in October of that year by M.A.O. Records and Enigma Records. After the second single, "Sex (I'm a ...)", the album received considerable attention and was re-released on January 26, 1983, by Geffen Records in the United States and by Mercury Records internationally. The album marked the return of lead singer Terri Nunn to the group. To date, it is Berlin's best-selling album and was certified platinum by the Recording Industry Association of America (RIAA) on February 9, 1993, becoming the band's only album to do so.

"Sex (I'm a ...)" peaked at number 62 on the Billboard Hot 100, while subsequent singles "The Metro" and "Masquerade" reached numbers 58 and 82, respectively. The album itself peaked at number 30 on the Billboard 200 in May 1983.

== Release ==
Originally including seven tracks on both vinyl and cassette, Pleasure Victim is sometimes listed as being an EP album. Subsequent cassette and CD versions of Pleasure Victim include the extended version of "Sex (I'm a ...)" as a bonus track. According to John Crawford, the album's reissue on Geffen was identical to the original Enigma release aside from "a little remixing".

On August 31, 2020, a remastered version of Pleasure Victim was released on CD by Rubellan Remasters, expanded with single mixes and extended remixes from 1982 and 1983. Early versions of singles from 1981, when Berlin was with M.A.O. Records, were not available for licensing.

== Reception ==
Professional ratings
Review scores
Source	Rating
AllMusic	4.5/5 stars
Christgau's Record Guide	C+

The album's original release on Enigma sold 25,000 copies, an exceptionally high number for an independent release.

In a joint review of Pleasure Victim's 1983 reissue and Soft Cell's The Art of Falling Apart, Michael Goldberg of Record panned the album, saying that Berlin's use of sex to sell their music (particularly noting the track "Sex (I'm a ...)" and the inner sleeve photo of Terri Nunn wearing nothing but a mink stole) is unintentionally humorous, and that the instrumentation is riddled with synthpop cliches. He concluded, "Like bad pornography, comic books and a Top 40 hit like 'Rosanna', one can wallow in the sheer trashiness of Pleasure Victim, though you wouldn't really want to call this stuff 'music'".

== Track listing ==
All tracks are written by John Crawford, except where noted.

Side one
No.	Title	Writer(s)	Length
1.	"Tell Me Why"		5:34
2.	"Pleasure Victim"		3:50
3.	"Sex (I'm a ...)"	Crawford; David Diamond; Terri Nunn	5:08

Side two
No.	Title	Writer(s)	Length
4.	"Masquerade"	Chris Ruiz-Velasco	4:04
5.	"The Metro"		4:07
6.	"World of Smiles"		3:50
7.	"Torture"		2:36
Total length:			29:07

Geffen reissue bonus track
No.	Title	Writer(s)	Length
8.	"Sex (I'm a ...)" (Extended Version)	Crawford; Diamond; Nunn	8:10
Total length:			37:17

2020 reissue bonus tracks
No.	Title	Writer(s)	Length
8.	"Sex (I'm a ...)" (Single Remix)	Crawford; Diamond; Nunn	3:31
9.	"Tell Me Why" (Single Remix)		4:10
10.	"The Metro" (Euro Single Remix)		4:28
11.	"Masquerade" (Single Remix)	Chris Ruiz-Velasco	4:04
12.	"Sex (I'm a ...)" (Extended Remix)	Crawford; Diamond; Nunn	8:08
13.	"The Metro" (Extended Remix)		6:19
14.	"Masquerade" (Extended Remix)		7:22

== Personnel ==
Credits adapted from the liner notes of Pleasure Victim.

=== Berlin ===
- John Crawford – bass, synthesizer, vocals
- David Diamond – synthesizer, guitar, vocals
- Terri Nunn – vocals
- Daniel Van Patten – drums, electronic percussion
- Chris Ruiz-Velasco – guitar
- Ric Olsen – guitar
- Rod Learned – drums (track 1)

=== Technical ===
- Daniel R. Van Patten – production (tracks 2–7); engineering
- The Maomen – production (track 1); remix (tracks 3, 4, 7)
- Charles Ramirez – engineering assistance
- Jon St. James – engineering assistance

=== Artwork ===
- PWR – still photography
- Mark Ulves – art direction, design
- Martin Mann – insert photographs

== Charts ==
=== Weekly charts ===
Weekly chart performance for Pleasure Victim
Chart (1983–1984)	Peak position
Canada Top Albums/CDs (RPM)	22
New Zealand Albums (RMNZ)	12
US Billboard 200	30

=== Year-end charts ===
1983 year-end chart performance for Pleasure Victim
Chart (1983)	Position
Canada Top Albums/CDs (RPM)	89
US Billboard 200	66

1984 year-end chart performance for Pleasure Victim
Chart (1984)	Position
New Zealand Albums (RMNZ)	31

== Certifications ==
Certifications for Pleasure Victim
Region	Certification	Certified units/sales
New Zealand (RMNZ)	Platinum	15,000^{^}
United States (RIAA)	Platinum	1,000,000^{^}
^{^} Shipments figures based on certification alone.
