= Love Life (Berlin album) =

Studio album by Berlin
- Released: March 12, 1984
- Recorded: October–December 1983
- Studios: Baby-O Recorders (Hollywood, California) (Note: Except "Dancing in Berlin" and "No More Words"); Oasis (North Hollywood, California) (Note: "Dancing in Berlin" and "No More Words")
- Genres: Synth-pop; dance-pop
- Length: 40:53
- Label: Geffen
- Producers: Mike Howlett; Giorgio Moroder; Richie Zito

Berlin chronology
Pleasure Victim (1982)	Love Life (1984)	Count Three & Pray (1986)

Singles from Love Life
- 1. "No More Words" Released: February 27, 1984; 2. "Now It's My Turn" Released: July 1984; 3. "Dancing in Berlin" Released: August 1984; 4. "Touch" Released: 1984

Love Life is the third studio album by American new wave band Berlin. It was released on March 12, 1984, by Geffen Records. Recorded between October and December 1983, the album features production from Mike Howlett, Giorgio Moroder, and Richie Zito. Four singles were released from the album, including "No More Words", which became the band's first top-40 single on the US Billboard Hot 100, peaking at number 23. Later, second single "Now It's My Turn" peaked at #74. The album itself became the band's highest-charting album on the Billboard 200, peaking at number 28.

== Reception ==
Professional ratings
Review scores
Source	Rating
AllMusic	3/5 stars
The Philadelphia Inquirer	1/5 stars
Rolling Stone	2/5 stars

From contemporary reviews, Ken Tucker of The Philadelphia Inquirer gave the album a one stars out of five rating, stating that Berlin "prove their mediocrity by being unable to sound funky even when dance-King Giorgio Moroder is behind the studio console."

== Track listing ==
All tracks are written by John Crawford, except where noted. All tracks are produced by Mike Howlett, except where noted.

Side one
No.	Title	Writer(s)	Producer(s)	Length
1.	"When We Make Love"			4:59
2.	"Touch"	Crawford; Terri Nunn; David Diamond		3:16
3.	"Beg, Steal or Borrow"			3:55
4.	"Now It's My Turn"			4:11
5.	"Dancing in Berlin"		Giorgio Moroder; Richie Zito	4:04

Side two
No.	Title	Producer(s)	Length
6.	"Pictures of You"		4:34
7.	"In My Dreams"		4:08
8.	"No More Words"	Moroder; Zito	3:54
9.	"For All Tomorrow's Lies"		3:48
10.	"Fall"		4:04
Total length:			40:53

2020 CD reissue bonus tracks
No.	Title	Producer(s)	Length
11.	"Rumor of Love"		4:21
12.	"Lost in the Crowd"		4:34
13.	"No More Words" (dance remix)	Moroder; Zito	5:43
14.	"Now It's My Turn" (remix)		4:20
15.	"Dancing in Berlin" (dance remix)	Moroder; Zito	5:17
Total length:			65:08

Cassette / 1987 US and Japanese CD release
No.	Title	Writer(s)	Producer(s)	Length
1.	"When We Make Love"			4:59
2.	"Touch"	Crawford; Nunn; Diamond		3:16
3.	"Beg, Steal or Borrow"			3:55
4.	"Now It's My Turn"			4:11
5.	"Dancing in Berlin"		Moroder; Zito	4:04
6.	"Rumor of Love"			4:20
7.	"Pictures of You"			4:34
8.	"In My Dreams"			4:08
9.	"No More Words"		Moroder; Zito	3:54
10.	"For All Tomorrow's Lies"			3:48
11.	"Fall"			4:04
12.	"Lost in the Crowd"			4:38
Total length:				49:51

=== Notes ===
- The tracks "Rumor of Love" and "Lost in the Crowd" are not included on the original LP releases.
- The 2020 CD reissue moves "Rumor of Love" and "Lost in the Crowd" to immediately after "Fall" and adds three bonus remixes.

== Personnel ==
Credits adapted from the liner notes of the 1987 CD release of Love Life.

=== Berlin ===
- Terri Nunn – lead vocals, background vocals, backing vocals arrangements
- John Crawford – bass, lead vocals, background vocals
- David Diamond – synthesizers, background vocals
- Ric Olsen – guitars
- Matt Reid – synthesizers
- Rob Brill – drums

=== Additional musicians ===
- Arthur Barrow – additional keyboard programming (tracks 5, 9)

=== Technical ===
- Mike Howlett – production (tracks 1–4, 6–8, 10–12)
- Giorgio Moroder – production (tracks 5, 9)
- Richie Zito – production (tracks 5, 9)
- Connie Hill – recording engineering
- Mike Shipley – mixing engineering
- Eddie Delena – mixing engineering assistance
- Dave Collins – digital machine operator
- Stewart Whitmore – digital editing
- Brian Reeves – engineering (track 5)
- Mick Guzauski – engineering (track 9)
- Steve Hodge – engineering (track 9)
- Steve Hall – mastering at Future Disc (Hollywood)

=== Artwork ===
- Richard Seireeni – art direction
- Phillip Dixon – cover photography
- Douglas Bryant – inner sleeve photo

== Charts ==
=== Weekly charts ===
Weekly chart performance for Love Life
Chart (1984)	Peak position
Australian Albums (Kent Music Report)	55
Canada Top Albums/CDs (RPM)	85
New Zealand Albums (RMNZ)	3
US Billboard 200	28

=== Year-end charts ===
Year-end chart performance for Love Life
Chart (1984)	Position
New Zealand Albums (RMNZ)	26

== Certifications ==
Certifications for Love Life
Region	Certification	Certified units/sales
New Zealand (RMNZ)	Platinum	15,000^{^}
United States (RIAA)	Gold	500,000^{^}
^{^} Shipments figures based on certification alone.
