= Information (Berlin album) =

Studio album by Berlin
- Released: 1980
- Studio: Sound Arts (Los Angeles); Devon Sound
- Genre: New wave; post-punk
- Length: 39:00
- Label: Zone H Records
- Producer: Jo Julian

Berlin chronology
Information (1980)	Pleasure Victim (1982)

Singles from Information
- 1. "A Matter of Time" Released: August 1980

Information is the debut studio album by Berlin. It was released in 1980 by Vinyl Records, and was recorded during the period when Terri Nunn had temporarily left the band to pursue an acting career and Virginia Macolino performed the lead vocals. Several songs were written by previous lead singer Toni Childs who went solo prior to the album's release.

== Track listing ==
Standard edition
No.	Title	Writer(s)	Length
1.	"Mind Control"	Julian	3:09
2.	"Modern World"	Velasco, Julian, Childs	3:54
3.	"Overload"	Julian, Childs	4:17
4.	"City Lights"	Velasco, Julian, Childs	4:38
5.	"Information"	Velasco	4:30
6.	"Talk Talk Video"	Velasco	3:25
7.	"Fascination"	Crawford	4:00
8.	"A Matter of Time"	Crawford	4:09
9.	"Middle Class Suicide"	Julian, Crawford, Childs	3:20
10.	"Uncle Sam"	Julian, Childs	3:45

== Personnel ==
- Virginia Macolino – lead vocals
- Chris Velasco – guitars, vocals
- Jo Julian – synthesizer, vocals, producer, engineer
- Dan Wyman – assistant synthesizer programmer
- John Crawford – bass, vocals
- Dan Van Patten – drums

Production staff:

- Jim Cypherd – assistant engineer, assistant synthesizer programmer
- Paul Lewis – assistant engineer
