= No More Words =

1984 single by American new wave band Berlin

- US 7-inch single cover

Single by Berlin

from the album Love Life
- B-side: "Rumor of Love"
- Released: February 27, 1984
- Recorded: November 1983
- Studio: Oasis (North Hollywood, California)
- Genre: Dance-rock
- Length: 3:54
- Label: Geffen
- Songwriter(s): John Crawford
- Producer(s): Giorgio Moroder; Richie Zito

Berlin singles chronology
"Masquerade" (1983)	"No More Words" (1984)	"Now It's My Turn" (1984)

Music video
- "No More Words" on YouTube

"No More Words" is a song by American new wave band Berlin from their third studio album, Love Life (1984). It was released on February 27, 1984, as the album's lead single. The single was the band's first top-40 entry on the Billboard Hot 100, peaking at number 23 on May 12, 1984. The song was featured in the 1985 film Vision Quest. In the United States, the song was re-released in 1985 as a B-side to Madonna's single "Crazy for You", which was also featured in Vision Quest.

The song was produced by Italian producer Giorgio Moroder and Richie Zito. The 7-inch single includes "Rumor of Love" as its B-side, while the 12-inch maxi single was paired with "Dancing in Berlin" and featured Moroder's dance remix of each song.

The accompanying music video saw the band portraying a criminal gang of bank robbers in which they re-enacted a Bonnie and Clyde-style car chase and shoot-out; it was directed by Evan English and Paul Goldman, and was included on the Berlin Video 45 video compilation in 1984.

== Track listings ==
- 7-inch single

A. "No More Words" – 3:54
B. "Rumor of Love" – 4:20

- 12-inch single (Dance Remix)

A. "No More Words" (Dance Remix) – 5:44
B. "Rumor of Love" – 4:20

- UK 12-inch single (Dance Remix)

A. "No More Words" (Dance Remix) – 5:44
B1. "Sex (I'm a ...)" – 8:07
B2. "Rumor of Love" – 4:20

- 12-inch maxi single ("No More Words"/"Dancing in Berlin")

A. "No More Words" (Dance Remix) – 5:44
B. "Dancing in Berlin" (Dance Remix) – 5:16

== Charts ==
=== Weekly charts ===
Weekly chart performance for "No More Words"
Chart (1984)	Peak position
Australia (Kent Music Report)	23
New Zealand (Recorded Music NZ)	5
US Billboard Hot 100	23
US Dance Club Songs (Billboard) with "Dancing in Berlin"	6
US Mainstream Rock (Billboard)	25

=== Year-end charts ===
Year-end chart performance for "No More Words"
Chart (1984)	Position
New Zealand (Recorded Music NZ)	27
