= Terri Nunn =

American actress and singer (born 1961)

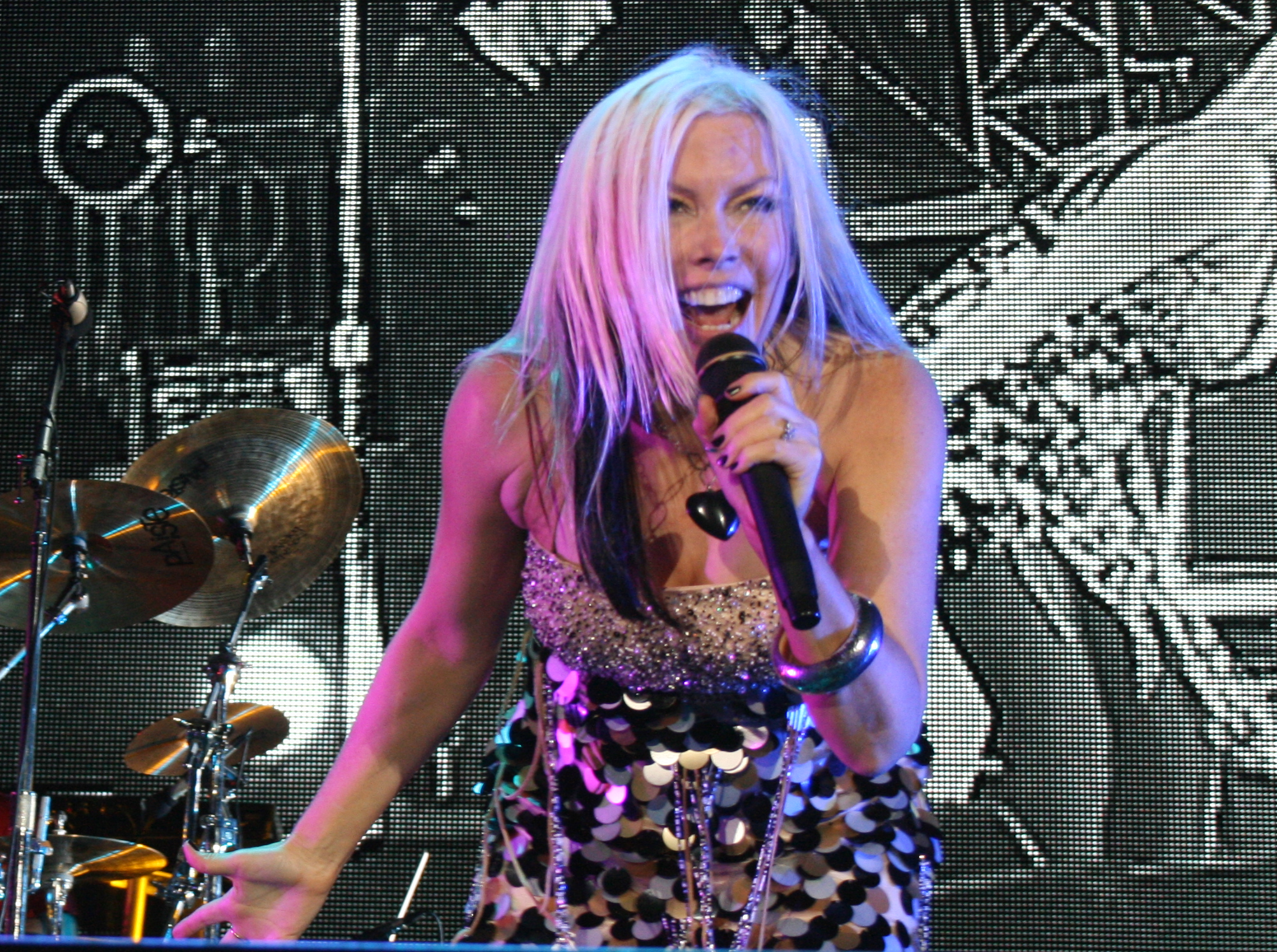
- Nunn performing at Oracle OpenWorld 2010

Background information
- Also known as: Berlin
- Born: Terri Kathleen Nunn; June 26, 1961 (age 65); Los Angeles, California, U.S.
- Origin: Los Angeles, California, U.S.
- Genres: New wave; synth-pop; post-punk; industrial rock; electronic dance
- Occupations: Singer; actress
- Years active: 1974–present
- Labels: DGC; Purple Pyramid
- Member of: Berlin

Terri Kathleen Nunn (born June 26, 1961) is an American singer and actress. She is known as the vocalist of the 1980s new wave and synth-pop band Berlin.

== Biography ==
Nunn was born in Baldwin Hills, Los Angeles, California on June 26, 1961. Her father Larry Nunn (1925–1974) was a painter and a former contract child actor for MGM (Men of Boys Town, The Major and the Minor). He was an alcoholic and died by suicide in 1974 when she was 13 years old. Her mother Joy appeared in her music video for "Sex (I'm a ...)".

In 1976, Nunn auditioned for the role of Princess Leia in Star Wars. Later that year, Nunn posed nude for Penthouse magazine, convincing the magazine that she was legally an adult, with the pictorial appearing in 1977 under a pseudonym. For many years, Nunn denied her participation as the photos were taken when she was a minor.

She joined Berlin in 1978 but temporarily left the group the following year to pursue an acting career. Nunn acted in numerous television shows in the 1970s and 1980s, including Family, T.J. Hooker, Lou Grant, Vega$ and James at 15. Nunn also appeared in the ensemble film Thank God It's Friday (1978).

In 1981, she rejoined Berlin as the lead vocalist and soon forged her recording career in the band. Her greatest success in Berlin was the top-selling single "Take My Breath Away", the theme song for the film Top Gun (1986). It reached the No. 1 spot on the Billboard Hot 100. She sang other popular songs with Berlin, including "Sex (I'm a ...)", "The Metro", "You Don't Know", "No More Words" and "Masquerade".

In 1985, Nunn briefly dated Michael Hutchence, whom she met at an INXS concert in London while Berlin was recording the album Count Three & Pray. The relationship ended when INXS returned to Australia.

In 1985, Nunn left Berlin and recorded the song "Dancing in Isolation" for the film Better Off Dead. In 1989, she performed a duet with Paul Carrack called "Romance", which was included on the soundtrack to the film Sing.

In 1991, she recorded and released a solo album entitled Moment of Truth, in association with David Z, Prince's Paisley Park producer.

In 1993, she approached lead singer Andrew Eldritch of The Sisters of Mercy with a recording of her vocal on a Billie Hughes song which led to their collaboration and ultimately became The Sisters of Mercy single "Under the Gun."

Nunn obtained usage rights to the band name "Berlin" in 1996, and reformed that band with new members, who began recording and touring. Berlin released the EPs Fall into Heaven and Fall into Heaven 2 in 1999, followed by Live: Sacred and Profane in 2000, their first live album. Voyeur hit shelves in 2002. 4Play (2005) contains original songs and cover versions of some of the band's songs.

In 2003, Berlin’s original lineup reunited for the VH1 series Bands Reunited.

In 2008, Nunn contributed sex and dating advice to Carrie Borzillo-Vrenna's book Cherry Bomb.

Nunn sang across the United States on the 2009 Regeneration Tour, which also featured Martin Fry of ABC, Wang Chung, and Cutting Crew.

In 2010, Nunn appeared as a guest judge on season two of RuPaul's Drag Race, mentoring the contestants in a rock-themed singing challenge.

Nunn co-hosts Between the Sheets, a popular podcast on webcast media station Hottalkla.com.

In January 2012, Nunn debuted her radio show on KCSN-FM. It features interviews and live performances.

Nunn performed at a 2020 New Year's Eve party at Mar-a-Lago, later expressing regret for performing at the event. Some fans and former band members expressed discontent towards her after this performance. They stated that it was outrageous to perform at a Trump-owned resort and that his blatant disregard for mask mandates should have been sufficient grounds for her to refuse playing the show.

=== Personal life ===
Nunn is married to attorney Paul Spear. In 2004, she adopted a baby who had been born in Russia and named her Natalie Joy. She also has two stepsons from her husband. The family has lived in Santa Rosa Valley, California, since 2012. Her cousin is Pamela Moore, also a singer, who has performed with Queensrÿche.

Nunn is a vegan. She became a vegetarian at age 19, then began eating fish in her 20s, before becoming a vegan in her 40s.

== Filmography ==
=== Film (as actress) ===
| Year | Title | Role | Type |
|---|---|---|---|
| 1978 | Thank God It's Friday | Jeannie | Feature film |

=== Television (as actress) ===
| Year | Title | Role | Type |
|---|---|---|---|
| 1976 | Police Story | Guest role: Julie Mitchell | TV series, 1 episode |
| 1977 | James at 15 | Guest role: Pam | TV series, 1 episode |
| 1977 | Rafferty | Guest role: Toni Power | TV series, 1 episode |
| 1978 | Family | Guest role: Jessica Millington | TV series, 1 episode |
| 1978 | Having Babies III | Ellie Miles | TV movie |
| 1978 | The Runaways | Guest role: Cathy/Barbara | TV series, 1 episode |
| 1978 | Katie: Portrait of a Centerfold | Cindy Holland | TV movie |
| 1978 | Barnaby Jones | Guest role: Olivia Hamilton | TV series, 1 episode |
| 1979; 1981 | Lou Grant | Guest role: Kitty Larsen | TV series, 1 episode |
| 1979 | Time Express | Guest role: Jill Martin | TV series, 1 episode |
| 1979 | Vega$ | Guest role: Ally | TV series, 1 episode |
| 1980 | Haven | Guest role: Eileen Malone | TV series, 1 episode |
| 1980 | Scared Straight! Another Story | Lucy | TV movie |
| 1980 | The Georgia Peaches | Sue Lynn | TV movie/pilot |
| 1981 | Lou Grant | Guest role: Wendy | TV series, 2 episodes |
| 1982 | Trapper John, M.D. | Guest role: Diane | TV series, 1 episode |
| 1982 | Making the Grade | Guest role | TV series, 1 episode |
| 1982 | T. J. Hooker | Guest role: Sue Anne | TV series, 1 episode |

== Discography ==
=== Studio albums ===
- Moment of Truth (1991)

==== Studio albums (with synth-pop band Berlin) ====
- Information (1980)
- Pleasure Victim (1982)
- Love Life (1984)
- Count Three & Pray (1986)
- Voyeur (2002)
- 4Play (2005)
- Animal (2013)
- Transcendance (2019)
- Strings Attached (2020)

==== Live albums ====
- Live: Sacred and Profane (2000)
- Terri Nunn & Berlin – All the Way In (2009)
- Sweet Surrender (Live 1984) (2019)
