= The Metro (song) =

- 1983 US reissue

Single by Berlin

from the album Pleasure Victim
- B-side: "Tell Me Why" (1981); "World of Smiles" (1983)
- Released: 1981; May 1983 (re-release)
- Recorded: 1981, Los Angeles
- Genre: Synth-pop; dance-pop; new wave; electronic rock
- Length: 4:07
- Label: MAO Music; Geffen (re-release)
- Songwriter: John Crawford
- Producer: Daniel R. Van Patten

Berlin singles chronology
"Sex (I'm a ...)" (1982)	"The Metro" (1981)	"Masquerade" (1983)

"The Metro", also published as "Metro", is a 1981 song written by John Crawford for his band, Berlin.

== Background ==
The song was first released as a non-album single, "The Metro" b/w "Tell Me Why", on the MAO Music label in 1981. It reappeared, slightly remixed, on Berlin's breakthrough album Pleasure Victim, released on the independent label Enigma in 1982 and re-released on Geffen in 1983. In May 1983, "The Metro" was re-released as the third single from the album, and the second to appear on the Geffen label. It was produced and engineered (as was most of the album) by the band's then-drummer and drum programmer, Daniel Van Patten.

The Berlin recording is known for epitomizing the new wave genre as a blending of punk rock and pop, with heavy use of the Sequential Circuits Prophet-5 synthesizer. Vocalist Terri Nunn said the song, which was a breakthrough hit for Berlin, "defined us and defined that period of music."

The song's music video was their first MTV hit, in heavy rotation on the young channel in its second and third years. Directed by Dominic Orlando, it was filmed in 1983 at GMT Studios in West Los Angeles, California. Terri Nunn only sang two lyrics on camera: "I remember hating you for loving me" and "Sorry". The video became a part of the Berlin Video 45 Geffen-VHS home video, released in 1984.

== Chart performance ==
The single surpassed the Billboard Hot 100 peak of their previous single, "Sex (I'm a ...)", reaching No. 58 in July 1983. It is currently their third-highest charting single in the U.S. A dance remix of the song received club play in 1983.

Subsequent remixes were done of Berlin's song, including one by Sigue Sigue Sputnik. A revamped Berlin lineup, led by the original group's Nunn, re-recorded the song circa 2000; this version received several remixes as well. An acoustic version was made available exclusively on iTunes.

One of their signature songs, it was among those performed by a reunion of the original lineup for a live show at The Roxy in Los Angeles which was the culmination of an episode of VH-1's Bands Reunited.

== Cover versions ==
- System of a Down recorded three cover versions of the song, the first on their untitled 1995 demo cassette, a second on their eponymous 1997 fourth demo cassette, and a third on the 2006 "Lonely Day" maxi single (the latter also appeared on the soundtracks for Dracula 2000 and Not Another Teen Movie).
  - SOAD's version was included in OC Weekly's 2016 list of "The 20 Best Metal Cover Songs".
- The Interrupters included a ska-punk cover of the song as a bonus track on their 2014 eponymous debut album.
- Alkaline Trio covered the song on their album Remains.
- Sleepthief covered the song on their album The Dawnseeker.
