= Sex (I'm a ...) =

1983 single by Berlin

- U.S. Geffen edition

Single by Berlin

from the album Pleasure Victim
- B-side: "Tell Me Why"
- Released: February 1983
- Recorded: 1982, Los Angeles
- Genre: Synth-pop; dance-pop
- Length: 3:30
- Label: Geffen
- Songwriters: John Crawford; David Diamond; Terri Nunn
- Producer: Daniel R. Van Patten

Berlin singles chronology
"Tell Me Why" (1981)	"Sex (I'm a ...)" (1983)	"The Metro" (1983)

"Sex (I'm a ...)" is a song by American new wave band Berlin from their second studio album, Pleasure Victim (1982). The song was co-written by group members John Crawford, Terri Nunn, and David Diamond and sung as a duet by Crawford and Nunn. It has an electronic disco arrangement, inspired by Giorgio Moroder, and in particular Donna Summer's "I Feel Love".

Released as the album's second single in February 1983, the single became a cult hit on American radio (and a massive hit in Canada, peaking at #4 on the RPM charts) and brought the group into the mainstream. Despite the significant attention, the song's racy lyrics resulted in its being banned from several radio stations. The single peaked at No. 62 on the Billboard Hot 100 for two weeks in late March and early April 1983. The song was also the first single release from the band's new label, Geffen Records.

The music video, which received only limited play on MTV, features a cameo appearance by Nunn's mother Joy.

Nunn later said the lyrics were inspired by her relationship with KROQ DJ Richard Blade, and her attempts to introduce elements of erotic roleplay into their sex life; this was confirmed by Blade.

== Track listing ==
1. "Sex (I'm a ...)" - 5:08
2. "Tell Me Why" - 3:50

== Charts ==
=== Weekly charts ===
Weekly chart performance for "Sex (I'm a ...)"
Chart (1983–1984)	Peak position
Australia (Kent Music Report)	81
Canada Top Singles (RPM)	4
Finland (Suomen virallinen lista)	19
New Zealand (Recorded Music NZ)	18
US Billboard Hot 100	62
US Dance Club Songs (Billboard)	8
US Mainstream Rock (Billboard)	10

=== Year-end charts ===
Year-end chart performance for "Sex (I'm a ...)"
Chart (1983)	Position
Canada Top Singles (RPM)	48
US Dance Club Songs (Billboard)	46

== Cover versions ==
- Canadian electroclash musician Peaches covered the song as a bonus track for her albums The Teaches of Peaches and Fatherfucker.
- Australian producer/DJ Mike Felks released a cover of the song in 2009, featuring Annemarie.
- Lovage released a cover in 2001 on their album Music to Make Love to Your Old Lady By
