= John Crawford (musician) =

American singer-songwriter

- Born: John Buckner Crawford; January 17, 1957 (age 69)
- Genres: Punk rock, new wave, dream pop, shoegazing, space rock, heavy metal
- Occupations: Musician, singer-songwriter, guitarist
- Instruments: Vocals, guitar, bass, synthesizer
- Years active: 1977–present

John Buckner Crawford (born January 17, 1957) is an American singer-songwriter noted for co-founding the pop group Berlin, which had several hit songs in the 1980s.

== Biography ==
Crawford attended El Dorado High School in Placentia, California. His career as a musician began in junior high school after he broke his leg during a basketball game. While recovering, he picked up a guitar and began taking lessons in nearby Fullerton, California, where his teacher put him in touch with future Berlin band members Dan Van Patten, Chris Velasco, and Tyson Cobb.

They formed a band named The Toys with Ty Cobb as vocalist. Crawford and the others were influenced by punk rockers like the Sex Pistols and synth-pop band Ultravox, and Crawford has also cited Kiss as an early influence.

== Berlin ==
After changing their name to Berlin, the band stayed together for about three years. Cobb was discharged from the group and replaced with Terri Nunn. In 1980, Berlin released the album Information on Zone H. Records, with Virginia Macolino fronting the group. The band signed to I.R.S. Records briefly in 1980, releasing the single "A Matter of Time", before disbanding in 1981.

With Berlin on indefinite hiatus, Crawford worked with another Orange County–based band, The Videos, with Craig Sibley on vocals and guitar, Rich West on keyboards, Ken Dudley on guitars, and John Benson on drums. He also worked as a vocalist for Fahrenheit, a synthesizer pop quartet in the style of Depeche Mode and Ultravox, also playing occasional bass and acoustic guitar.

In late 1981, some time around the formation of Fahrenheit, Los Angeles-based independent label M.A.O. Records released a new Berlin single, featuring the songs "The Metro" and "Tell Me Why", with Terri Nunn on vocals. 1982's platinum-selling Pleasure Victim gained Crawford's music an audience. Crawford part-wrote all of the album's songs except "Masquerade," which was written by guitarist and original Berlin member Chris Ruiz-Velasco.

== Rising star ==
After the success of Pleasure Victim on the independent Enigma label, a bidding war ensued, with Geffen's label eventually offering the band and their British expatriate manager, Perry Watts-Russell, the opportunity to release the record to a wider audience. The disc, recorded at the Casbah recording studio in Fullerton, California for around $3,000, included the controversial hit single "Sex (I'm a ...)" as well as "Masquerade" and "The Metro". Guitarist Ric Olsen and keyboardist/guitarist David Diamond helped to re-create a synth-driven sound of early 1980s techno pop. The follow-up to Pleasure Victim, titled Love Life, went gold in 1984, with a hit single, "No More Words".

With personnel changes, the band's third album, Count Three and Pray, was released in 1986. It was produced by Bob Ezrin (producer of rock superstars including Kiss, Pink Floyd, Peter Gabriel, Lou Reed and Alice Cooper) and featured guest appearances by others, including Dave Gilmour of Pink Floyd, Ted Nugent, and Elliot Easton of The Cars. The album's chart-topping single "Take My Breath Away", written by Giorgio Moroder, featured in the film Top Gun.

== End of "the Berlin Era" ==
Crawford and Nunn argued, Berlin again disbanded, and Crawford formed another band, The Big F. He said in an interview in 2005 that they were going to "focus on just making music, and let the rest of the stuff go away."

With Crawford on bass and vocals, The Big F's self-titled debut album for Elektra in 1988 represented an experiment in anti-commercialism, with dark themes and an aggressive, hard rock sound. Before courting the attention of record labels, Crawford and Brill concealed their identities to avoid any association with Berlin. Crawford took the name John Shreve and Brill became Rob Donin. Mark Christian joined the trio as guitarist, and they contributed a cover version of the MC5 song "Kick Out the Jams" to the 1990 Elektra compilation Rubáiyát.

The Big F's second album, Is, was released on Chrysalis in 1993, and like the first, failed to find a large audience. For the Is tour, the band hired a bassist, allowing Crawford/Shreve to concentrate solely on vocals. In 1995, they called it quits.

== Christianity ==
Following a short-lived attempt at reuniting Berlin with Nunn, Crawford took a step away from the music industry to focus on his family and sort out the aftermath of his success. It was 10 years before he performed again or wrote another note of music. In the early 1990s, Crawford took a leap of faith and became a born-again Christian, an act that he credits with saving not only his soul but his marriage to Jacquelyn, with whom he had three children, Paul, Sydney, and Samantha.

In 2003 the members of Berlin's (roughly) pre-Love Life era lineup got together at the behest of VH1’s Bands Reunited show, resulting in phone conversations between Crawford and Diamond that Crawford credits with inspiring him to begin writing again.

"I have to kind of give credit to David Diamond," Crawford said in late 2005. I just had a lot of fun talking to him about music. I talked to him on the phone a little bit afterwards, and it just kind of perked me up a little bit. I just decided to try it, just to write some stuff for myself, just to see what it was like."

The resulting self-released album, Surrender, represents 12 tracks of Crawford's songwriting and vocals, emphasizing his newfound faith, along with his precise guitar and bass playing and drum programming.

Surrender features guest appearances by former Big F bandmate Mark Christian and was co-produced by former Stacey Q bandleader Jon St. James. The album was recorded at Crawford's home studio with additional recording and mixing done at St. James’ studio.

During his tenure as Berlin's main songwriter, Crawford wrote most of his songs using an acoustic guitar, though these days his main composing tools are his personal computer and a music application called Reason, produced by Propellerhead Software.

Surrender was available from Crawford's website, where he frequently posts in his public journal about his life as a musician and his conversion to Christianity.

An album of new material titled 8 Days was released in August 2006, and Crawford is reportedly working on a new album of material to be called Tarantula that he says is closer to Berlin's early 1980s sound than anything he's released in the past 20 years. According to Crawford's posts on his message board, due to the financial expense involved in self-releasing his two solo CDs, he may offer MP3 downloads of this new electronic music, song by song, as he completes them. Also on his website, Crawford has hinted that he is open to the idea of playing Christian praise and worship music.

== Discography ==
=== Berlin ===
- Information (1980)
- Pleasure Victim (1982)
- Love Life (1984)
- Count Three & Pray (1986)
- Transcendance (2019)
- Strings Attached (2020)

=== The Big F ===
(As John Shreve) (lead vocalist, bassist, songwriter)

- The Big F (1989)
- Patience Peregrine (EP) (1993)
- Is (1993)

=== As solo artist ===
- Surrender (2005)
- 8 Days (2006)
- "After Berlin" (2015)
