= Berlin (band) =

American synthpop band

- Berlin, c. 1983. L–R: David Diamond, Rob Brill, Terri Nunn, John Crawford, Matt Reid, and Ric Olsen.

Background information
- Origin: Los Angeles, California, U.S.
- Genres: New wave; synth-pop; post-punk
- Years active: 1978–1987; 1997–present
- Labels: Enigma; Geffen; Columbia; Time Bomb
- Spinoffs: The Big F
- Members: Terri Nunn; John Crawford; David Diamond; Dave Schulz; Carlton Bost; Ric "Rocc" Roccapriore
- Past members: Paloma Estevez; Chris Olivas; Joseph Diforte; Mitchell Sigman; Rob Brill; Rod Learned; Virginia Macolino; Jo Julian; Ric Olsen; Dan Van Patten; Matt Reid; Chris Ruiz-Velasco; Roger O'Donnell; Toni Childs
- Website: www.berlinpage.com

Berlin is an American new wave/synth-pop band formed in Los Angeles in 1978. The band gained commercial success in the 1980s with singles including "The Metro", "Sex (I'm a ...)", "No More Words" and the chart-topping "Take My Breath Away" from the 1986 film Top Gun, which won the Academy Award for Best Original Song and a Golden Globe Award for Best Original Song. The group disbanded right after reaching global success, but resumed activity ten years later in 1997. The best-known lineup consisted of singer Terri Nunn, bass guitarist and vocalist John Crawford, keyboardist David Diamond, guitarist Ric Olsen, keyboardist Matt Reid, and drummer Rob Brill.

== History ==
=== Early years ===
The genesis of Berlin was the rock band the Toys, formed in 1976 in Orange County, California, by John Crawford (bass guitar), Dan Van Patten (drums), Chris Ruiz-Velasco (guitar), and Tyson A. Cobb (vocals). After a few shows, the band changed its name to Berlin and stayed together for about three years but ultimately regrouped, discharging Cobb as lead singer. After a brief time when Toni Childs was lead singer, Terri Nunn joined the band after answering an ad through the Musicians Contact Service in Hollywood in 1979. Despite its name, Berlin did not have any known major connections with the sometime capital of Germany; the name was chosen to make them seem European and exotic. Terri Nunn explained in a 2003 interview, "...Berlin started that way [electronic], and in a sense helped to bring that to America. 'Cause when we started, it was going on in Europe, but it wasn't really happening here yet." The band was inspired by the keyboard-oriented groups Kraftwerk, Devo, Sparks, Giorgio Moroder and The Screamers.

The band's first single, "A Matter of Time", was released in 1979 on Renegade Records and they appeared on television for the first time on the short-lived Hollywood Heartbeat, hosted by former Fleetwood Mac guitarist Bob Welch. Nunn left the group later that year to pursue an acting career, and was replaced by Virginia Macolino. The band released the 1980 album Information, with Macolino as lead vocalist, but the band struggled to sign with a mainstream label without Nunn. As band manager, Perry Watts-Russell explained, "Unfortunately, the record labels that had shown interest in December 1979, when Terri was the singer, were no longer keen to sign the band. So, by later that year, Berlin had effectively broken up, and John had formed and was the lead singer in another group, Fahrenheit, with Dan Van Patten. But he had some songs that he thought were better suited to Terri's voice, and he asked me if I thought she might be interested in singing them. We asked and she was."

=== Eventual success ===
Nunn rejoined the band as singer in 1980, after which they signed to independent label Enigma Records. They then released a double A-sided single, "Tell Me Why" / "The Metro". The single was intended as a one-off, since Crawford was by then focusing on his new band, Fahrenheit, and regarded Berlin as a "just for fun" side project. However, the single was a success, helping to finance the EP album, Pleasure Victim, which was recorded on a $2,900 budget. The EP included their first significant hit: the controversial synth-driven "Sex (I'm a ...)" (1982), which was banned by some radio stations due to its graphic lyrics. The song was intentionally written and composed to get airplay on Los Angeles area radio station KROQ, which specialized in playing music that was not heard on other stations, and of which members of the group were fans. Due to the attention brought on by the single, wider release offers were made by larger record labels for Pleasure Victim. Geffen Records' offer was accepted and the label re-released Pleasure Victim worldwide in early 1983. The label also re-released "The Metro", which then became another hit. By this point, the band consisted of core members Nunn, Crawford, and long-time keyboardist/guitarist David Diamond, augmented by guitarist Ric Olsen, keyboardist Matt Reid, and a series of drummers. Van Patten still contributed heavily to Pleasure Victim but was ultimately replaced by Rod Learned, who performed on Pleasure Victim's opening track and later appeared with the band during their performance at the 1983 US Festival. Learned's tenure in the band proved short-lived, and by the following year, new drummer Rob Brill had joined the group in his place.

In 1984, the band released their next album, Love Life, and the single "No More Words", whose subsequent video saw Terri Nunn and bandmates re-enact a Bonnie and Clyde-style car chase and shoot-out, became their first top-40 hit. "Take My Breath Away" (for the movie Top Gun soundtrack), co-written and produced by Giorgio Moroder, became their best-selling single in 1986 and a huge international hit, but also their last big hit.

=== Members ===
Aside from Nunn, members of the band were founding member John Crawford (primary songwriter, bass guitar and synthesizer), and David Diamond (synthesizer & guitar). Ric Olsen (lead guitar) was brought in during the final recording of Pleasure Victim. Other members added were Matt Reid (synthesizer), Rod Learned (drums: 1982–1983) and Rob Brill (drums: 1983–1987). Berlin's breakout EP, 1982's Pleasure Victim, featured Nunn, Crawford, and Diamond, as well as guitarist Olsen, drummer, synthesist and producer Dan Van Patten and guitarist Chris Ruiz-Velasco. Before Pleasure Victim was completed, Van Patten and Ruiz-Velasco parted ways with Nunn, Crawford, and Diamond. Ric Olsen was brought in to complete tracks on Pleasure Victim.

=== Dissolution and re-formation ===
Berlin officially disbanded in 1987, because of both the lack of success of their album Count Three & Pray and personal disagreements over the single "Take My Breath Away". Nunn viewed it as a fresh new song that allowed the band to perform globally, while others disliked it as it had not been written or composed by any of them. Later, after the release of the 1991 solo album Moment of Truth, Nunn retained the legal rights to usage of the band's name after legal wranglings with the founding member of the group, John Crawford. Drummer Rob Brill and John Crawford formed the alternative hard rock trio, The Big F, along with guitarist Mark Christian. They released two studio albums (The Big F and Is). Nunn recreated Berlin, with a new lineup of musicians, in 1997. In 1999, Berlin opened for The Go-Go's on their West Coast reunion tour.

=== After 2000 ===
In 2000–2001, Berlin contributed to several artist tribute albums. The only track to make it on to a full Berlin release is a cover of Marilyn Manson's "The Dope Show", which is included on Berlin's 4play album as well as the Marilyn Manson tribute album Anonymous Messiah (2001, Vitamin Records). Other tributes include material by Madonna, Blondie and Depeche Mode.

In 2004, Berlin was featured on the VH1 show, Bands Reunited where the roughly pre-Love Life era lineup of the band (John Crawford, Terri Nunn, David Diamond, Ric Olsen, Matt Reid and Rod Learned) agreed to reunite as a band and as friends. They played one show at The Roxy in California to a sold-out crowd.

The band, featuring Nunn supported by other members who were not part of the classic line-up, toured with rock band INXS during the summer of 2011. Gerald Casale of Devo created a video for Berlin which was scheduled to debut at a late November 2011 performance. Nunn herself was scheduled both to debut a radio show on KCSN-FM, and to record a new album, in 2012.

In July 2013, it was announced that a new album called Animal would be released on September 17, from which a single "It's The Way" would also be issued.

In an August 9, 2016, interview with The Washington Times, Nunn announced the original members (Crawford, Nunn and Diamond) had been writing new material, and planning a tour and new album for 2017.

On the 80s Cruise 2018, Ric Olsen, David Diamond and John Crawford performed with the Nunn-fronted version of Berlin. Rather than replacing any of the existing members, Diamond and Crawford are merging with Nunn's current Berlin incarnation to form a six-person line-up. They performed two new songs from their forthcoming album. They jokingly announced the album's title would be Woke, a suggestion from VJ Mark Goodman during a Q & A session on the cruise, and that the album would be released in July 2018. Although an official name has not been determined, the new album was scheduled for release later that year.

In May 2019, Terri Nunn announced that she and co-founders John Crawford and David Diamond would be reuniting for a new album, Transcendance, to be released on August 2, 2019.

Berlin was among hundreds of artists whose material was reportedly destroyed in the 2008 Universal fire. The accuracy of this report was disputed by Vinny Vero, a music producer who works for the reissue label Cherry Red. Vero observed that Berlin's album masters were “safe and sound” while working on reissues of another Geffen recording artist. Later the same year, Universal located two session reels containing 11 unique or early versions of songs recorded in 1983 between Pleasure Victim and Love Life, as well as an unreleased outtake from Love Life.

On August 2, 2019, Berlin featuring Terri Nunn released their eighth album, Transcendance.

On November 27, 2020, Berlin released their ninth album, Strings Attached, which includes re-recordings of previous songs backed by a full orchestra.

On December 31, 2020, Terri Nunn performed as a solo act at Donald Trump's Mar-a-Lago New Year's Eve Party along with Vanilla Ice. Soon thereafter, Nunn expressed deep regret for participating in the event, stating not only that she did not intend it to be an endorsement or support of any political party, but also that she was unaware of the laxness of COVID laws in the State of Florida and was astonished to find that masks and social distancing were not required at the event, as she had been led to believe otherwise.

== Discography ==
=== Studio albums ===
- Information (1980)
- Pleasure Victim (1982)
- Love Life (1984)
- Count Three & Pray (1986)
- Voyeur (2002)
- 4Play (2005)
- Animal (2013)
- Transcendance (2019)
- Strings Attached (2020)

=== Live albums ===
- Live: Sacred and Profane (2000)
- Terri Nunn & Berlin – All the Way In (2009)
- Sweet Surrender (Live 1984) (2019)
