= Top Gun (franchise) =

American media franchise

- Created by: Jim Cash; Jack Epps Jr.
- Original work: "Top Guns" (1983 article) by Ehud Yonay
- Owners: Paramount Pictures (Skydance)
- Years: 1986–present

Films and television
- Films: Top Gun (1986); Top Gun: Maverick (2022); Top Gun 3

Games
- Video games: List of video games

Audio
- Soundtracks: Top Gun (1986); Top Gun: Maverick (2022)
- Original music: "Danger Zone" "Take My Breath Away" "Heaven in Your Eyes" "Mighty Wings" "Playing with the Boys" "Top Gun Anthem" "Hold My Hand" "I Ain't Worried"

Top Gun is an American action drama multimedia franchise based on the 1983 article "Top Guns" by Ehud Yonay, which was adapted into the eponymous 1986 film, written by Jim Cash and Jack Epps Jr. The original film portrays Tom Cruise as Lieutenant Pete "Maverick" Mitchell, a young naval aviator aboard the aircraft carrier USS Enterprise, who, with his radar intercept officer, LTJG Nick "Goose" Bradshaw, is given the chance to train at the US Navy's Fighter Weapons School at Naval Air Station Miramar in San Diego, California.

Produced and released by Paramount Pictures, Top Gun became a cultural phenomenon and, despite receiving mixed reviews, was acclaimed for its groundbreaking visual effects and energetic soundtrack. It was followed by the 2022 sequel film Top Gun: Maverick, which takes place 36 years after the events of the first film and depicts Maverick's reluctant return to the United States Navy Strike Fighter Tactics Instructor program, where he must confront his past as he trains a group of younger aviators, among them the son of his deceased best friend. Top Gun: Maverick was met with greater critical and commercial success than the original, with praise for its story, performances, emotional weight, and flying sequences.

== Films ==
Top Gun films
Film	U.S. release date	Directed by	Screenplay by	Story by	Produced by
Top Gun	May 16, 1986	Tony Scott	Jim Cash & Jack Epps Jr.	Jim Cash & Jack Epps Jr.	Don Simpson & Jerry Bruckheimer
Top Gun: Maverick	May 27, 2022	Joseph Kosinski	Ehren Kruger, Eric Warren Singer & Christopher McQuarrie	Peter Craig & Justin Marks	Tom Cruise, David Ellison, Jerry Bruckheimer & Christopher McQuarrie

=== Future ===
In May 2022, Miles Teller stated that he had been pitching a follow-up film centered around his character to the studio. The actor referred to his pitch as Top Gun: Rooster. By July of the same year, he stated that he has been having ongoing discussions regarding a sequel with Tom Cruise. In January 2024, Ehren Kruger was hired to write the script for the project.

In August of 2025, following the merger of Paramount and Skydance Media, Chairman and CEO of the conglomerate David Ellison announced that Top Gun 3 is one of the highest priorities for the studio. Dana Goldberg, co-chair of Paramount Pictures further reaffirmed this priority.

At CinemaCon in April 2026, the film was officially announced as having been given the green light, with Tom Cruise confirmed to reprise his role as Peter "Maverick" Mitchell.

== Main cast and characters ==
List indicator

This section includes characters who will appear or have appeared in the franchise in main roles.

- An empty grey cell indicates the character was not in the film, or that the character's official presence has not yet been confirmed.

Character	Films		
Character	Top Gun	Top Gun: Maverick	Untitled film
Pete "Maverick" Mitchell	Tom Cruise	Tom Cruise	Tom Cruise
Tom "Iceman" Kazansky	Val Kilmer	Val Kilmer	
Charlotte "Charlie" Blackwood	Kelly McGillis	Kelly McGillis^{A}^{C}	
Nick "Goose" Bradshaw	Anthony Edwards	Anthony Edwards^{A}^{C}	
Carole Bradshaw	Meg Ryan	Meg Ryan^{A}^{C}	
Bradley "Rooster" Bradshaw	Aaron & Adam Weis	Miles Teller Aaron & Adam Weis^{Y}^{A}^{C}	
Mike "Viper" Metcalf	Tom Skerritt		
Rick "Jester" Heatherly	Michael Ironside		
Bill "Cougar" Cortell	John Stockwell		
Leonard "Wolfman" Wolfe	Barry Tubb		
Ron "Slider" Kerner	Rick Rossovich		
Sam "Merlin" Wells	Tim Robbins		
Marcus "Sundown" Williams	Clarence Gilyard		
Rick "Hollywood" Neven	Whip Hubley		
Tom "Stinger" Jardian	James Tolkan		
Charles "Chipper" Piper	Adrian Pasdar		
Penelope "Penny" Benjamin	Mentioned	Jennifer Connelly	
Beau "Cyclone" Simpson		Jon Hamm	
Jake "Hangman" Seresin		Glen Powell	
Robert "Bob" Floyd		Lewis Pullman	
Chester "Hammer" Cain		Ed Harris	
Solomon "Warlock" Bates		Charles Parnell	
Natasha "Phoenix" Trace		Monica Barbaro	
Reuben "Payback" Fitch		Jay Ellis	
Mickey "Fanboy" Garcia		Danny Ramirez	
Javy "Coyote" Machado		Greg Davis	
Bernie "Hondo" Coleman		Bashir Salahuddin	
Billy "Fritz" Avalone		Manny Jacinto	
Logan "Yale" Lee		Raymond Lee	
Brigham "Harvard" Lennox		Jake Picking	
Neil "Omaha" Vikander		Jack Schumacher	
Callie "Halo" Bassett		Kara Wang	
Amelia Benjamin		Lyliana Wray	
Sarah Kazansky		Jean Louisa Kelly	
Jimmy		James Handy	

== Crew and production details ==
Film	Composers	Cinematographer	Editors	Production companies	Distributing company	Runtime
Top Gun	Harold Faltermeyer; Giorgio Moroder	Jeffrey L. Kimball	Billy Weber; Chris Lebenzon	Paramount Pictures; Don Simpson/Jerry Bruckheimer Films	Paramount Pictures	110 mins
Top Gun: Maverick	Harold Faltermeyer; Lady Gaga; Hans Zimmer; Lorne Balfe	Claudio Miranda	Eddie Hamilton	Paramount Pictures; Skydance Media, Don Simpson/Jerry Bruckheimer Films	Paramount Pictures	130 mins

== Reception ==
=== Box office performance ===
Film	Release date	Box office			Budget	Ref.
Film	Release date	North America	Other territories	Worldwide	Budget	Ref.
Top Gun	May 16, 1986	$180,470,489	$176,999,033	$357,469,522	$15,000,000	
Top Gun: Maverick	May 27, 2022	$718,732,821	$770,000,000	$1,488,732,821	$170,000,000	
Total		$899,203,310	$946,999,033	$1,810,919,866	$185 million	

=== Critical and public response ===
Film	Critical		Public
Film	Rotten Tomatoes	Metacritic	CinemaScore
Top Gun	58% (76 reviews)	50 (15 reviews)	A
Top Gun: Maverick	96% (444 reviews)	78 (63 reviews)	A+

=== Accolades ===
Academy Awards received by the Top Gun franchise
Category	1987	2023
Category	Top Gun	Top Gun: Maverick
Best Picture	—N/a	Nominated
Best Adapted Screenplay	—N/a	Nominated
Best Film Editing	Nominated	Nominated
Best Sound	Nominated	Won
Best Sound Editing	Nominated	—N/a
Best Original Song	Won	Nominated
Best Visual Effects	—N/a	Nominated

== Music ==
=== Soundtracks ===
Title	U.S. release date	Length	Label
Top Gun	May 13, 1986	38:38	Columbia Records
Top Gun: Maverick (Music from the Motion Picture)	May 27, 2022	43:35	Interscope Records

=== Singles ===
- "Danger Zone"
- "Take My Breath Away"
- "Heaven in Your Eyes"
- "Mighty Wings"
- "Playing with the Boys"
- "Top Gun Anthem"
- "Hold My Hand"
- "I Ain't Worried"

The soundtrack to the original film reached number one in the US charts for five nonconsecutive weeks in the summer and autumn of 1986. It was the best selling soundtrack of 1986 and is still one of the best selling soundtrack albums of all time. The soundtrack spawned two top 10 singles on the US charts, with the song "Danger Zone" by Kenny Loggins peaking at number two and the song "Take My Breath Away" by Berlin reaching number one, the latter of which would also go on to win both the Academy Award for Best Original Song and the Golden Globe Award for Best Original Song. According to Allmusic, the album "remains a quintessential artifact of the mid-'80s", and the album's hits "still define the bombastic, melodramatic sound that dominated the pop charts of the era."

The soundtrack to the sequel featured the singles "Hold My Hand" by Lady Gaga and "I Ain't Worried" by OneRepublic, with the latter becoming a top 10 hit. The score of the film harkened back to the original film's sound and was noted by Zanobard Reviews as a "thoroughly entertaining and incredibly nostalgic musical experience from beginning to end".

== Video games ==
Top Gun also spawned a number of video games for various platforms. The original game was released in 1986 under the same title as the film. It was released on Commodore 64, ZX Spectrum, Amstrad CPC, and Atari ST. Another game, also titled Top Gun, was released in 1987 for Nintendo Entertainment System (NES) and Nintendo VS. System arcade cabinets. In the 1987 game, the player pilots an F-14 Tomcat fighter, and has to complete four missions. A sequel, Top Gun: The Second Mission, was released for the NES three years later.

Another game, Top Gun: Fire at Will, was released in 1996 for the PC and later for the Sony PlayStation platform. Top Gun: Hornet's Nest was released in 1998. Top Gun: Combat Zones was released for PlayStation 2 in 2001 and was subsequently released for the GameCube and Microsoft Windows. Combat Zones features other aircraft besides the F-14. In 2006, another game simply titled Top Gun was released for the Nintendo DS. A 2010 game, also titled Top Gun, retells the film's story. At E3 2011, a new game was announced, Top Gun: Hard Lock, which was released in March 2012 for Xbox 360, PC, and PlayStation 3.
