= List of accolades received by Top Gun: Maverick =

Top Gun: Maverick accolades
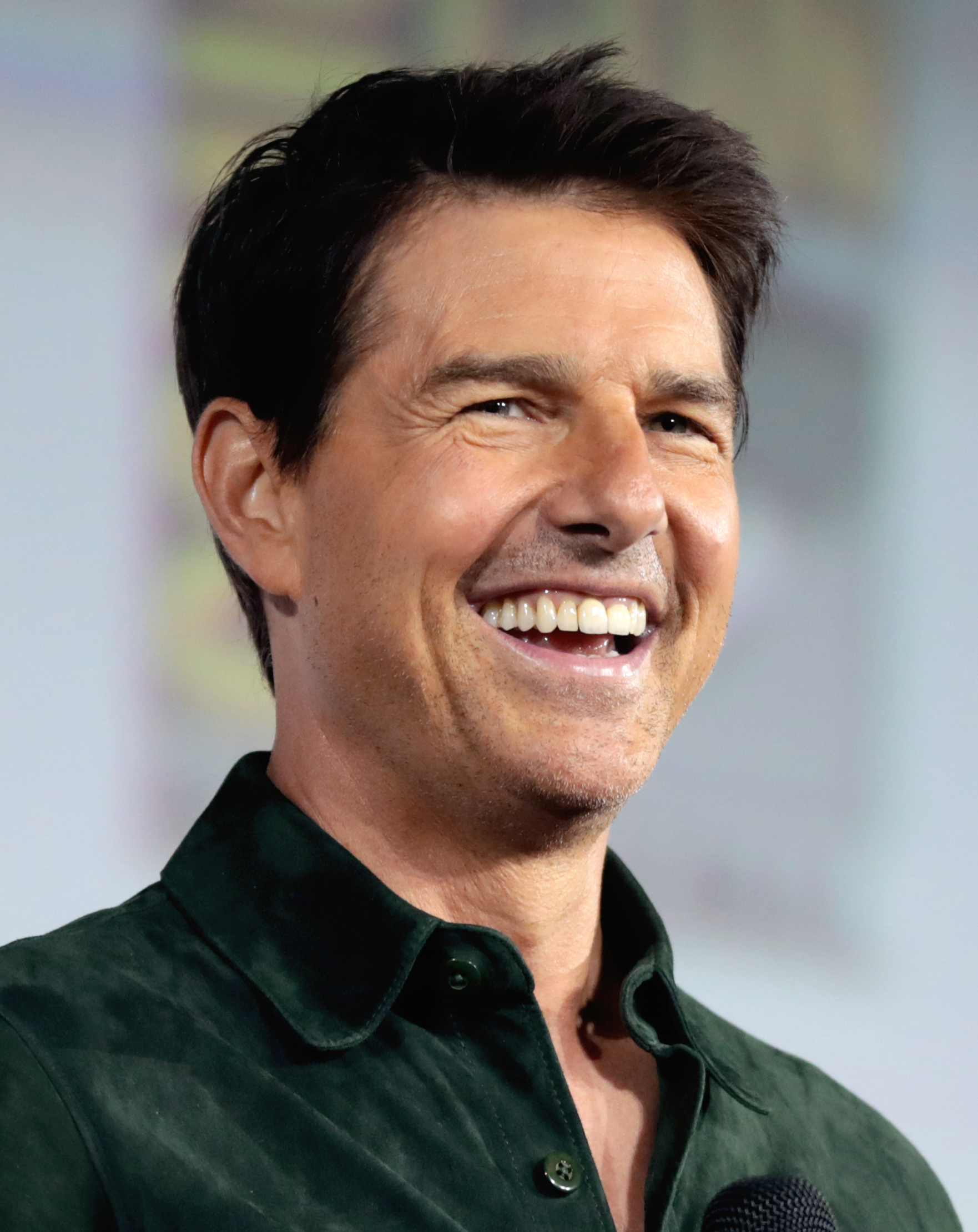
- Tom Cruise received multiple awards and nominations for reprising his role in the film.
Awards and nominations
Award	Wins	Nominations
AACTA International Awards	0	1
AARP Movies for Grownups Awards	1	2
Academy Awards	1	6
Alliance of Women Film Journalists Awards	1	2
American Cinema Editors Awards	1	1
American Film Institute Awards	1	1
American Music Awards	0	1
American Society of Cinematographers Awards	0	1
Art Directors Guild Awards	0	1
Artios Awards	0	1
Austin Film Critics Association Awards	1	6
Australian Film Critics Association Awards	0	1
Billboard Music Awards	0	1
British Academy Film Awards	0	4
California On Location Awards	2	2
Camerimage Awards	1	2
Capri Hollywood International Film Festival Awards	3	3
Chicago Film Critics Association Awards	0	2
Cinema Audio Society Awards	1	1
Costume Designers Guild Awards	0	1
Critics' Choice Movie Awards	1	6
Critics' Choice Super Awards	2	3
Dallas-Fort Worth Film Critics Association Awards	2	3
Directors Guild of America Awards	0	1
Dublin Film Critics' Circle Awards	1	1
Florida Film Critics Circle Awards	1	2
Georgia Film Critics Association Awards	3	3
Golden Globe Awards	0	2
Golden Reel Awards	1	2
Golden Trailer Awards	6	10
Grammy Awards	0	2
Guild of Music Supervisors Awards	0	1
Hollywood Critics Association Awards	0	3
Hollywood Critics Association Creative Arts Awards	2	7
Hollywood Critics Association Midseason Awards	2	4
Hollywood Music in Media Awards	0	2
Hollywood Professional Association Awards	0	2
Houston Film Critics Society Awards	1	6
ICG Publicists Awards	1	1
Irish Film & Television Awards	0	2
Japan Academy Film Prize	1	1
Japan Gold Disc Awards	2	2
Location Managers Guild Awards	0	1
London Film Critics' Circle Awards	0	1
Lumiere Awards	2	2
Movieguide Awards	0	2
MTV Movie & TV Awards	1	6
National Board of Review Awards	2	2
New York Film Critics Circle Awards	1	1
New York Film Critics Online Awards	1	1
Nickelodeon Kids' Choice Awards	0	3
Online Film Critics Society Awards	3	5
People's Choice Awards	1	6
Producers Guild of America Awards	0	1
San Diego Film Critics Society Awards	1	2
San Francisco Bay Area Film Critics Circle Awards	0	2
Sant Jordi Awards	1	1
Satellite Awards	4	11
Saturn Awards	3	5
Screen Actors Guild Awards	1	1
Seattle Film Critics Society Awards	1	8
Set Decorators Society of America Awards	1	1
Society of Composers & Lyricists Awards	0	1
St. Louis Film Critics Association Awards	2	6
Visual Effects Society Awards	0	3
Washington D.C. Area Film Critics Association Awards	2	4
World Soundtrack Awards	0	1
Writers Guild of America Awards	0	1

Totals (Note: Certain award groups do not simply award one winner. They acknowledge several different recipients, have runners-up, and have third place. Since this is a specific recognition and is different from losing an award, runner-up mentions are considered wins in this award tally. For simplification and to avoid errors, each award in this list has been presumed to have had a prior nomination.)
- Wins: 66
- Nominations: 184

Top Gun: Maverick is a 2022 American action drama film directed by Joseph Kosinski and written by Ehren Kruger, Eric Warren Singer, and Christopher McQuarrie from a story by Peter Craig and Justin Marks. The sequel to Top Gun (1986), it stars Tom Cruise, Val Kilmer, Miles Teller, Jennifer Connelly, Jon Hamm, Glen Powell, Lewis Pullman, and Ed Harris. In the film, Captain Pete "Maverick" Mitchell (Cruise) confronts his past while training a group of younger Top Gun graduates, including the son of his deceased best friend, for a dangerous mission.

Top Gun: Maverick premiered at CinemaCon on April 28, 2022, and was released in the United States on May 27. Produced on a budget of $170–177 million, Maverick grossed $1.493 billion, finishing its theatrical run as the second-highest-grossing film of 2022 and the highest-grossing film of Cruise's career. On the review aggregator website Rotten Tomatoes, the film holds an approval rating of 96% based on 476 reviews.

Top Gun: Maverick garnered awards and nominations in various categories with particular recognition for Cruise's performance as well as its sound and visual effects, cinematography, and film editing. It received six nominations at the 95th Academy Awards, including Best Picture, and won Best Sound. At the 76th British Academy Film Awards, the film was nominated for Best Cinematography, Best Editing, Best Sound, and Best Special Visual Effects. Maverick received six nominations at the 28th Critics' Choice Awards and won Best Cinematography. It garnered two nominations at the 80th Golden Globe Awards. In addition to two National Board of Review Awards, Maverick was named one of the top-ten films of 2022 by the American Film Institute.

== Accolades ==
Accolades received by Top Gun: Maverick
Award	Date of ceremony	Category	Recipient(s)	Result	Ref.
AACTA International Awards	February 24, 2023	Best Film	Top Gun: Maverick	Nominated	
AARP Movies for Grownups Awards	January 28, 2023	Best Movie for Grownups	Top Gun: Maverick	Won	
AARP Movies for Grownups Awards	January 28, 2023	Best Actor	Tom Cruise	Nominated	
Academy Awards	March 12, 2023	Best Picture	Tom Cruise, Christopher McQuarrie, David Ellison and Jerry Bruckheimer	Nominated	
Academy Awards	March 12, 2023	Best Adapted Screenplay	Ehren Kruger, Eric Warren Singer, Christopher McQuarrie, Peter Craig and Justin Marks	Nominated	
Academy Awards	March 12, 2023	Best Original Song	Lady Gaga and BloodPop for "Hold My Hand"	Nominated	
Academy Awards	March 12, 2023	Best Sound	Mark Weingarten, James H. Mather, Al Nelson, Chris Burdon and Mark Taylor	Won	
Academy Awards	March 12, 2023	Best Film Editing	Eddie Hamilton	Nominated	
Academy Awards	March 12, 2023	Best Visual Effects	Ryan Tudhope, Seth Hill, Bryan Litson and Scott R. Fisher	Nominated	
Alliance of Women Film Journalists Awards	January 5, 2023	Best Cinematography	Claudio Miranda	Won (Note: Tied with Polly Morgan for The Woman King (2022))	
Alliance of Women Film Journalists Awards	January 5, 2023	Best Editing	Eddie Hamilton	Nominated	
American Cinema Editors Awards	March 5, 2023	Best Edited Feature Film – Dramatic	Eddie Hamilton	Won	
American Film Institute Awards	December 9, 2022	Top 10 Films of the Year	Top Gun: Maverick	Won (Note: This award does not have a single winner, but recognizes multiple films.)	
American Music Awards	November 20, 2022	Top Soundtrack	Top Gun: Maverick	Nominated	
American Society of Cinematographers Awards	March 5, 2023	Outstanding Achievement in Cinematography in Theatrical Releases	Claudio Miranda	Nominated	
Art Directors Guild Awards	February 18, 2023	Excellence in Production Design for a Contemporary Film	Jeremy Hindle	Nominated	
Artios Awards	March 9, 2023	The Zeitgeist Award	Denise Chamian and Jordana Sapiurka	Nominated	
Austin Film Critics Association Awards	January 10, 2023	Best Film	Top Gun: Maverick	Nominated	
Austin Film Critics Association Awards	January 10, 2023	Best Actor	Tom Cruise	Nominated	
Austin Film Critics Association Awards	January 10, 2023	Best Cinematography	Claudio Miranda	Nominated	
Austin Film Critics Association Awards	January 10, 2023	Best Film Editing	Eddie Hamilton	Nominated	
Austin Film Critics Association Awards	January 10, 2023	Best Stunt Coordinator	Kevin LaRosa Jr. and Casey O'Neill	Nominated	
Austin Film Critics Association Awards	January 10, 2023	Special Honorary Award	Glen Powell (Note: Also for Apollo 10 1/2: A Space Age Childhood (2022) and Devotion (2022))	Won	
Australian Film Critics Association Awards	March 10, 2023	Best International Film (English Language)	Top Gun: Maverick	Nominated	
Billboard Music Awards	November 19, 2023	Top Soundtrack	Top Gun: Maverick	Nominated	
British Academy Film Awards	February 19, 2023	Best Cinematography	Claudio Miranda	Nominated	
British Academy Film Awards	February 19, 2023	Best Editing	Eddie Hamilton	Nominated	
British Academy Film Awards	February 19, 2023	Best Sound	Chris Burdon, James H. Mather, Al Nelson, Mark Taylor, and Mark Weingarten	Nominated	
British Academy Film Awards	February 19, 2023	Best Special Visual Effects	Seth Hill, Scott R. Fisher, Bryan Litson, and Ryan Tudhope	Nominated	
California On Location Awards	November 14, 2021	Location Manager of the Year – Studio Feature	Mike Fantasia	Won	
California On Location Awards	December 4, 2022	Location Manager of the Year – Music Video	Mark Zekanis for "Hold My Hand"	Won	
Camerimage Awards	November 19, 2022	Main Competition (Golden Frog)	Claudio Miranda	Nominated	
Camerimage Awards	November 19, 2022	Festival Director's Award	Claudio Miranda and Joseph Kosinski	Won	
Capri Hollywood International Film Festival Awards	January 4, 2023	Best Cinematography	Claudio Miranda	Won	
Capri Hollywood International Film Festival Awards	January 4, 2023	Best Editing	Eddie Hamilton	Won	
Capri Hollywood International Film Festival Awards	January 4, 2023	Best Visual Effects	Top Gun: Maverick	Won	
Chicago Film Critics Association Awards	December 14, 2022	Best Cinematography	Claudio Miranda	Nominated	
Chicago Film Critics Association Awards	December 14, 2022	Best Use of Visual Effects	Top Gun: Maverick	Nominated	
Cinema Audio Society Awards	March 4, 2023	Outstanding Achievement in Sound Mixing for a Motion Picture – Live Action	Mark Weingarten, Chris Burdon, Mark Taylor, Al Clay, Stephen Lipson, and Blake Collins	Won	
Costume Designers Guild Awards	February 27, 2023	Excellence in Contemporary Film	Marlene Stewart	Nominated	
Critics' Choice Movie Awards	January 15, 2023	Best Picture	Top Gun: Maverick	Nominated	
Critics' Choice Movie Awards	January 15, 2023	Best Actor	Tom Cruise	Nominated	
Critics' Choice Movie Awards	January 15, 2023	Best Cinematography	Claudio Miranda	Won	
Critics' Choice Movie Awards	January 15, 2023	Best Editing	Eddie Hamilton	Nominated	
Critics' Choice Movie Awards	January 15, 2023	Best Song	"Hold My Hand"	Nominated	
Critics' Choice Movie Awards	January 15, 2023	Best Visual Effects	Top Gun: Maverick	Nominated	
Critics' Choice Super Awards	March 16, 2023	Best Action Movie	Top Gun: Maverick	Won	
Critics' Choice Super Awards	March 16, 2023	Best Actor in an Action Movie	Tom Cruise	Won	
Critics' Choice Super Awards	March 16, 2023	Best Actress in an Action Movie	Jennifer Connelly	Nominated	
Dallas–Fort Worth Film Critics Association Awards	December 19, 2022	Top 10 Films	Top Gun: Maverick	5th place	
Dallas–Fort Worth Film Critics Association Awards	December 19, 2022	Best Actor	Tom Cruise	Nominated	
Dallas–Fort Worth Film Critics Association Awards	December 19, 2022	Best Cinematography	Claudio Miranda	Runner-up	
Directors Guild of America Awards	February 18, 2023	Outstanding Directing – Feature Film	Joseph Kosinski	Nominated	
Dublin Film Critics' Circle Awards	December 15, 2022	Best Cinematography	Claudio Miranda	Won	
Florida Film Critics Circle Awards	December 22, 2022	Best Cinematography	Claudio Miranda	Runner-up	
Florida Film Critics Circle Awards	December 22, 2022	Best Visual Effects	Top Gun: Maverick	Nominated	
Georgia Film Critics Association Awards	January 13, 2023	Best Picture	Top Gun: Maverick	Runner-up	
Georgia Film Critics Association Awards	January 13, 2023	Best Cinematography	Claudio Miranda	Won	
Georgia Film Critics Association Awards	January 13, 2023	Best Original Song	Lady Gaga, BloodPop, and Benjamin Rice for "Hold My Hand"	Won	
Golden Globe Awards	January 10, 2023	Best Motion Picture – Drama	Top Gun: Maverick	Nominated	
Golden Globe Awards	January 10, 2023	Best Original Song	Lady Gaga, BloodPop, and Benjamin Rice for "Hold My Hand"	Nominated	
Golden Reel Awards	February 26, 2023	Outstanding Achievement in Sound Editing – Dialogue and ADR for Feature Film	Bjørn Ole Schroeder, James Mather, Al Nelson, Chris Gridley, Simon Chase, Matthew Hartman, Michael Maroussas, and Gwendolyn Yates Whittle	Nominated	
Golden Reel Awards	February 26, 2023	Outstanding Achievement in Sound Editing – Sound Effects and Foley for Feature Film	Al Nelson, James Mather, Bjørn Ole Schroeder, Christopher Boyes, Jed Loughran, Benjamin A. Burtt, Scott Guitteau, Rowan Watson, Qianbaihui Yang, Luke Dunn Gielmuda, Dmitri Makarov, David Mackie, Jana Vance, Ronni Brown, John Roesch, and Shelley Roden	Won	
Golden Trailer Awards	July 22, 2021	Best Summer 2021 Blockbuster Trailer	"Elite" (MOCEAN)	Nominated	
Golden Trailer Awards	July 22, 2021	Best Teaser	"Service" (AV Squad)	Nominated	
Golden Trailer Awards	July 22, 2021	Best Action TV Spot	"End Super Bowl" (AV Squad)	Won	
Golden Trailer Awards	October 6, 2022	Best In Show	"Back" (AV Squad)	Won	
Golden Trailer Awards	October 6, 2022	Best Action	"Back" (AV Squad)	Won	
Golden Trailer Awards	October 6, 2022	Best Summer 2022 Blockbuster Trailer	"Back" (AV Squad)	Won	
Golden Trailer Awards	October 6, 2022	Best Action/Thriller TrailerByte for a Feature Film	"Aviator" (Create Advertising Group)	Won	
Golden Trailer Awards	October 6, 2022	Best BTS/EPK for a Feature Film (Over 2 Minutes)	"Ground to Air" (Jamestown Productions)	Nominated	
Golden Trailer Awards	June 29, 2023	Best Digital – Action	"Aviation Day" (Paradise Creative)	Won	
Golden Trailer Awards	June 29, 2023	Best BTS/EPK for a Feature Film (Under 2 Minutes)	"Aviation Day" (Paradise Creative)	Nominated	
Grammy Awards	February 5, 2023	Best Compilation Soundtrack for Visual Media	Harold Faltermeyer, Lady Gaga, Hans Zimmer, and Lorne Balfe for Top Gun: Maverick	Nominated	
Grammy Awards	February 5, 2023	Best Song Written for Visual Media	BloodPop and Lady Gaga for "Hold My Hand"	Nominated	
Guild of Music Supervisors Awards	March 5, 2023	Best Song Written and/or Recorded Created for a Film	Lady Gaga, BloodPop, and Randy Spendlove for "Hold My Hand"	Nominated	
Hollywood Critics Association Awards	February 24, 2023	Best Picture	Top Gun: Maverick	Nominated	
Hollywood Critics Association Awards	February 24, 2023	Best Actor	Tom Cruise	Nominated	
Hollywood Critics Association Awards	February 24, 2023	Best Action Film	Top Gun: Maverick	Nominated	
Hollywood Critics Association Creative Arts Awards	February 24, 2023	Best Cinematography	Claudio Miranda	Won	
Hollywood Critics Association Creative Arts Awards	February 24, 2023	Best Editing	Eddie Hamilton	Nominated	
Hollywood Critics Association Creative Arts Awards	February 24, 2023	Best Marketing Campaign	Top Gun: Maverick	Nominated	
Hollywood Critics Association Creative Arts Awards	February 24, 2023	Best Original Song	Lady Gaga for "Hold My Hand"	Nominated	
Hollywood Critics Association Creative Arts Awards	February 24, 2023	Best Sound	Mark Weingarten, James H. Mather, Al Nelson, Chris Burdon, and Mark Taylor	Won	
Hollywood Critics Association Creative Arts Awards	February 24, 2023	Best Stunts	Top Gun: Maverick	Nominated	
Hollywood Critics Association Creative Arts Awards	February 24, 2023	Best Visual Effects	Ryan Tudhope, Scott R. Fisher, Seth Hill, and Bryan Litson	Nominated	
Hollywood Critics Association Midseason Film Awards	July 1, 2022	Best Picture	Top Gun: Maverick	Nominated	
Hollywood Critics Association Midseason Film Awards	July 1, 2022	Best Director	Joseph Kosinski	Runner-up	
Hollywood Critics Association Midseason Film Awards	July 1, 2022	Best Actor	Tom Cruise	Runner-up	
Hollywood Critics Association Midseason Film Awards	July 1, 2022	Best Supporting Actor	Miles Teller	Nominated	
Hollywood Music in Media Awards	November 16, 2022	Best Original Song – Feature Film	Lady Gaga and BloodPop for "Hold My Hand"	Nominated	
Hollywood Music in Media Awards	November 16, 2022	Best Soundtrack Album	Lady Gaga, OneRepublic, Harold Faltermeyer, Lorne Balfe, Hans Zimmer, Kenny Loggins, and Miles Teller for Top Gun: Maverick	Nominated	
Hollywood Professional Association Awards	November 17, 2022	Outstanding Color Grading – Feature Film	Stefan Sonnenfeld and Adam Nazarenko	Nominated	
Hollywood Professional Association Awards	November 17, 2022	Outstanding Editing – Feature Film	Eddie Hamilton	Nominated	
Houston Film Critics Society Awards	February 18, 2023	Best Picture	Top Gun: Maverick	Nominated	
Houston Film Critics Society Awards	February 18, 2023	Best Actor	Tom Cruise	Nominated	
Houston Film Critics Society Awards	February 18, 2023	Best Original Song	"Hold My Hand"	Nominated	
Houston Film Critics Society Awards	February 18, 2023	Best Cinematography	Claudio Miranda	Won	
Houston Film Critics Society Awards	February 18, 2023	Best Visual Effects	Top Gun: Maverick	Nominated	
Houston Film Critics Society Awards	February 18, 2023	Best Stunt Coordination Team	Top Gun: Maverick	Nominated	
ICG Publicists Awards	March 10, 2023	Maxwell Weinberg Publicists Showmanship Motion Picture Award	Top Gun: Maverick	Won	
Irish Film & Television Awards	May 7, 2023	Best International Film	Top Gun: Maverick	Nominated	
Irish Film & Television Awards	May 7, 2023	Best International Actor	Tom Cruise	Nominated	
Japan Academy Film Prize	March 10, 2023	Outstanding Foreign Language Film	Top Gun: Maverick	Won	
Japan Gold Disc Awards	March 9, 2023	Soundtrack Album of the Year	Top Gun: Maverick	Won	
Japan Gold Disc Awards	March 9, 2023	Song of the Year by Download (Western)	"Hold My Hand"	Won	
Location Managers Guild Awards	August 27, 2022	Outstanding Locations in a Contemporary Film	Top Gun: Maverick	Nominated	
London Film Critics' Circle Awards	February 5, 2023	Film of the Year	Top Gun: Maverick	Nominated	
Lumiere Awards	February 10, 2023	Best Original Song	"Hold My Hand"	Won	
Lumiere Awards	February 10, 2023	Best Scene or Sequence in a Feature Film	Top Gun: Maverick	Won	
Movieguide Awards	February 26, 2023	Best Movie for Mature Audiences	Top Gun: Maverick	Nominated	
Movieguide Awards	February 26, 2023	Faith and Freedom Award for Movies	Top Gun: Maverick	Nominated	
MTV Movie & TV Awards	May 7, 2023	Best Movie	Top Gun: Maverick	Nominated	
MTV Movie & TV Awards	May 7, 2023	Best Performance in a Movie	Tom Cruise	Won	
MTV Movie & TV Awards	May 7, 2023	Best Hero	Tom Cruise	Nominated	
MTV Movie & TV Awards	May 7, 2023	Best Duo	Tom Cruise and Miles Teller	Nominated	
MTV Movie & TV Awards	May 7, 2023	Best Song	Lady Gaga for "Hold My Hand"	Nominated	
MTV Movie & TV Awards	May 7, 2023	Best Song	OneRepublic for "I Ain't Worried"	Nominated	
National Board of Review Awards	December 8, 2022	Best Film	Top Gun: Maverick	Won	
National Board of Review Awards	December 8, 2022	Outstanding Achievement in Cinematography	Claudio Miranda	Won	
New York Film Critics Circle Awards	December 2, 2022	Best Cinematography	Claudio Miranda	Won	
New York Film Critics Online Awards	December 11, 2022	Top Films of the Year	Top Gun: Maverick	Won	
Nickelodeon Kids' Choice Awards	March 4, 2023	Favorite Movie	Top Gun: Maverick	Nominated	
Nickelodeon Kids' Choice Awards	March 4, 2023	Favorite Movie Actor	Tom Cruise	Nominated	
Nickelodeon Kids' Choice Awards	March 4, 2023	Favorite Song	OneRepublic for "I Ain't Worried"	Nominated	
Online Film Critics Society Awards	January 23, 2023	Best Picture	Top Gun: Maverick	7th place	
Online Film Critics Society Awards	January 23, 2023	Best Cinematography	Claudio Miranda	Won	
Online Film Critics Society Awards	January 23, 2023	Best Editing	Eddie Hamilton	Nominated	
Online Film Critics Society Awards	January 23, 2023	Best Visual Effects	Top Gun: Maverick	Nominated	
Online Film Critics Society Awards	January 23, 2023	Stunt Coordination	Top Gun: Maverick	Won	
People's Choice Awards	December 6, 2022	Movie of 2022	Top Gun: Maverick	Nominated	
People's Choice Awards	December 6, 2022	Action Movie of 2022	Top Gun: Maverick	Won	
People's Choice Awards	December 6, 2022	Male Movie Star of 2022	Tom Cruise	Nominated	
People's Choice Awards	December 6, 2022	Male Movie Star of 2022	Miles Teller	Nominated	
People's Choice Awards	December 6, 2022	Action Movie Star of 2022	Tom Cruise	Nominated	
People's Choice Awards	December 6, 2022	Song of 2022	Lady Gaga for "Hold My Hand"	Nominated	
Producers Guild of America Awards	February 25, 2023	Outstanding Producer of Theatrical Motion Pictures	Jerry Bruckheimer, Tom Cruise, Christopher McQuarrie, and David Ellison	Nominated	
San Diego Film Critics Society Awards	January 6, 2023	Best Sound Design	Top Gun: Maverick	Won	
San Diego Film Critics Society Awards	January 6, 2023	Best Visual Effects	Top Gun: Maverick	Nominated	
San Francisco Bay Area Film Critics Circle Awards	January 9, 2023	Best Cinematography	Claudio Miranda	Nominated	
San Francisco Bay Area Film Critics Circle Awards	January 9, 2023	Best Film Editing	Eddie Hamilton	Nominated	
Sant Jordi Awards	April 25, 2023	Best Foreign Film	Joseph Kosinski	Won	
Satellite Awards	March 3, 2023	Best Motion Picture, Drama	Top Gun: Maverick	Won	
Satellite Awards	March 3, 2023	Best Director	Joseph Kosinski	Nominated	
Satellite Awards	March 3, 2023	Best Actor in a Motion Picture, Drama	Tom Cruise	Nominated	
Satellite Awards	March 3, 2023	Best Adapted Screenplay	Peter Craig, Ehren Kruger, Justin Marks, Christopher McQuarrie, and Eric Warren Singer	Nominated	
Satellite Awards	March 3, 2023	Best Cinematography	Claudio Miranda	Won	
Satellite Awards	March 3, 2023	Best Editing	Eddie Hamilton	Nominated	
Satellite Awards	March 3, 2023	Best Original Score	Harold Faltermeyer, Lady Gaga, Hans Zimmer, and Lorne Balfe	Nominated	
Satellite Awards	March 3, 2023	Best Original Song	Lady Gaga and BloodPop for "Hold My Hand"	Won	
Satellite Awards	March 3, 2023	Best Sound	Mark Weingarten, James H. Mather, and Al Nelson	Won	
Satellite Awards	March 3, 2023	Best Visual Effects	Scott R. Fisher, Ryan Tudhope, Seth Hill, and Bryan Litson	Nominated	
Satellite Awards	March 3, 2023	Stunt Performance Award	Casey O'Neill	Won	
Saturn Awards	October 25, 2022	Best Action/Adventure Film	Top Gun: Maverick	Won	
Saturn Awards	October 25, 2022	Best Actor in a Film	Tom Cruise	Won	
Saturn Awards	October 25, 2022	Best Film Direction	Joseph Kosinski	Nominated	
Saturn Awards	October 25, 2022	Best Film Editing	Eddie Hamilton	Won	
Saturn Awards	October 25, 2022	Best Film Visual/Special Effects	Scott R. Fisher and Ryan Tudhope	Nominated	
Screen Actors Guild Awards	February 26, 2023	Outstanding Performance by a Stunt Ensemble in a Motion Picture	Top Gun: Maverick	Won	
Seattle Film Critics Society Awards	January 17, 2023	Best Picture	Top Gun: Maverick	Nominated	
Seattle Film Critics Society Awards	January 17, 2023	Best Director	Joseph Kosinski	Nominated	
Seattle Film Critics Society Awards	January 17, 2023	Best Actor in a Leading Role	Tom Cruise	Nominated	
Seattle Film Critics Society Awards	January 17, 2023	Best Ensemble Cast	Denise Chamian	Nominated	
Seattle Film Critics Society Awards	January 17, 2023	Best Action Choreography	Top Gun: Maverick	Nominated	
Seattle Film Critics Society Awards	January 17, 2023	Best Cinematography	Claudio Miranda	Won	
Seattle Film Critics Society Awards	January 17, 2023	Best Film Editing	Eddie Hamilton	Nominated	
Seattle Film Critics Society Awards	January 17, 2023	Best Visual Effects	Ryan Tudhope, Scott R. Fisher, Seth Hill, and Bryan Litson	Nominated	
Set Decorators Society of America Awards	February 14, 2023	Best Achievement in Decor/Design of a Contemporary Feature Film	Jan Pascale and Jeremy Hindle	Won (Note: Tied with Tár (2022))	
Society of Composers & Lyricists Awards	February 15, 2023	Outstanding Original Song for a Dramatic or Documentary Visual Media Production	Lady Gaga and BloodPop for "Hold My Hand"	Nominated	
St. Louis Film Critics Association Awards	December 18, 2022	Best Action Film	Top Gun: Maverick	Won	
St. Louis Film Critics Association Awards	December 18, 2022	Best Cinematography	Claudio Miranda	Nominated	
St. Louis Film Critics Association Awards	December 18, 2022	Best Visual Effects	Ryan Tudhope, Scott R. Fisher, Seth Hill, and Bryan Litson	Nominated	
St. Louis Film Critics Association Awards	December 18, 2022	Best Editing	Eddie Hamilton	Nominated	
St. Louis Film Critics Association Awards	December 18, 2022	Best Soundtrack	Top Gun: Maverick	Nominated	
St. Louis Film Critics Association Awards	December 18, 2022	Best Scene	"Iceman/Maverick visit"	Runner-up	
Visual Effects Society Awards	February 15, 2023	Outstanding Visual Effects in a Photoreal Feature	Ryan Tudhope, Paul Molles, Seth Hill, Bryan Litson, and Scott Fisher	Nominated	
Visual Effects Society Awards	February 15, 2023	Outstanding Compositing and Lighting in a Feature	Saul Davide Galbiati, Jean-Freceric Veilleux, Felix B. Lafontaine, and Cynthia Rodriguez del Castillo	Nominated	
Visual Effects Society Awards	February 15, 2023	Outstanding Model in a Photoreal or Animated Project	Christian Peck, Klaudio Ladavac, Aram Jung, and Peter Dominik for "F-14 Tomcat"	Nominated	
Washington D.C. Area Film Critics Association Awards	December 12, 2022	Best Film	Top Gun: Maverick	Nominated	
Washington D.C. Area Film Critics Association Awards	December 12, 2022	Best Actor	Tom Cruise	Nominated	
Washington D.C. Area Film Critics Association Awards	December 12, 2022	Best Cinematography	Claudio Miranda	Won	
Washington D.C. Area Film Critics Association Awards	December 12, 2022	Best Editing	Eddie Hamilton	Won	
World Soundtrack Awards	October 22, 2022	Best Original Song Written Directly for a Film	BloodPop and Lady Gaga for "Hold My Hand"	Nominated	
Writers Guild of America Awards	March 5, 2023	Best Adapted Screenplay	Ehren Kruger, Eric Warren Singer, and Christopher McQuarrie	Nominated	
