= Top Gun Anthem =

Single by Harold Faltermeyer and Steve Stevens

from the album Top Gun
- Released: November 1986
- Recorded: 1985
- Genre: Instrumental rock; glam metal; hard rock
- Length: 4:12
- Label: Columbia
- Songwriter: Harold Faltermeyer
- Producer: Harold Faltermeyer

Audio
- "Top Gun Anthem" on YouTube

"Top Gun Anthem" is an instrumental rock composition and the theme of the Top Gun media franchise, including the original 1986 film Top Gun and its 2022 sequel Top Gun: Maverick. Harold Faltermeyer wrote the music and played keyboard, with Steve Stevens playing guitar. In the film, the full song is played in the film's ending scene.

== Overview ==
An edited version of the song without Stevens' guitar part is played in the opening sequence set aboard the aircraft carrier deck during launch preparations. The scene is set so that after the first F-14 Tomcat's engines are on full afterburner and the aircraft subsequently launches from the catapult, the music immediately segues into Kenny Loggins' "Danger Zone". This edited version would re-appear in a similar fashion during the opening scene of Top Gun: Maverick, only with F/A-18 E/F Super Hornets and F-35s replacing the since-retired F-14s.

In an interview for Red Bull Academy in 2014, Faltermeyer recalled simultaneously recording keyboard parts for Billy Idol's Whiplash Smile while also composing a melody for a scene in the movie Fletch. Idol passed by the control room on a break and opened the door for a listen. He liked the melody and pumped his fist in the air, saying it was "Top Gun". In a 2022 interview with AXS TV, Stevens said Faltermeyer showed him a Betamax copy of the film's workprint and offered him to record the guitar section of the song.

The deep bell-sounding synth that opens the song was produced by two daisy-chained Yamaha TX816-s (which are themselves combinations of eight Yamaha DX7-s each), accompanied by a Roland TR-808 drum loop.

== Achievements ==
"Top Gun Anthem" won a 1987 Grammy Award for Best Pop Instrumental Performance.

== Music video ==
The song's music video, directed by Dominic Sena, shows Faltermeyer playing the piano and Stevens on electric guitar in a hangar with naval aircraft. This video was re-released within the 2004 Top Gun Collector's Edition DVD.

Stevens used his signature Hamer SS guitar in the music video but he used his Charvel San Dimas Glow and a 100-watt Marshall amplifier to record his part; he also used a Boss compressor pedal to add more sustain. There is only one guitar track throughout the entire piece, with a short overdub during the ending.

== Availability ==
The song is available on both the original Top Gun soundtrack album and the expanded edition. A re-recorded version is also available on the Top Gun: Maverick soundtrack.

== Personnel ==
- Harold Faltermeyer – keyboards, synthesizers, Roland TR-808 programming
- Steve Stevens – electric guitar

== Other uses ==
The theme was used in Bollywood movie Darr.

The theme was played on organ as an intro to "Don't Need a Gun" during Billy Idol's Whiplash Smile tour. When Steve Stevens does his guitar solos during Billy Idol concerts, he often plays part of the Anthem during the solos.

In the 2024 film The Garfield Movie, the theme plays as Garfield calls a swarm of delivery drones to surround a train.

A similar tune was found in the 1988 Amiga flight simulator F/A-18 Interceptor.

Rapper T.I. sampled the guitar riff for his song "Big Things Poppin'."

On July 3, 2008, Activision released a free downloadable version of the "Top Gun Anthem" covered by Steve Ouimette for both the PlayStation 3 and Xbox 360 versions of Guitar Hero III: Legends of Rock.

A remixed version of the song is featured as the official soundtrack for the Top Gun: Maverick DLC in Ace Combat 7: Skies Unknown, alongside "Danger Zone".

== Charts ==
Chart performance for "Top Gun Anthem" (Maverick version)
Chart (2022)	Peak position
Hungary (Single Top 40)	11
South Korea Download (Circle)	159
US Rock Digital Song Sales (Billboard)	11
