= Mighty Wings =

Single by Cheap Trick

from the album Top Gun
- B-side: "Dog Fight #3"
- Released: June 1986
- Genre: Synth-rock
- Length: 3:50
- Label: Columbia Records
- Songwriters: Harold Faltermeyer; Mark Spiro
- Producer: Harold Faltermeyer

Cheap Trick singles chronology
"How About You" (1985)	"Mighty Wings" (1986)	"It's Only Love" (1986)

"Mighty Wings" is a song by American rock band Cheap Trick, which was released in 1986 as the third single from the soundtrack of the film Top Gun. It was written by Harold Faltermeyer and Mark Spiro, and produced by Faltermeyer.

Despite the commercial success of the Top Gun soundtrack, and unlike the four other singles culled from the album, "Mighty Wings" failed to make an appearance in the Billboard chart. It was the third of five singles to be released from the soundtrack, following "Danger Zone" by Kenny Loggins and "Take My Breath Away" by Berlin.

In the film Top Gun, the music (without vocals) is played in the first training session at Miramar, while the full version with vocals is played in the end credits.

== Background ==
Shortly prior to the song's release, guitarist Rick Nielsen said in an interview with MTV's Alan Hunter: "We just finished a song in the studio last night with Harold Faltermeyer, recording a song for his movie called "Top Gun" which has Tom Cruise in it, and so the song we did was called "Mighty Wings". We didn't write it but we did it, and it sounds pretty cool. That's coming out this summer."

== Release ==
"Mighty Wings" was originally due to be released as the second single from Top Gun. However, it was announced in Billboard that it had been pushed back in favour of "Take My Breath Away". "Mighty Wings" was released by Columbia in late June and issued on 7" vinyl in the US, Canada, Japan and South Africa. The B-side, "Dog Fight #3", is an instrumental written and performed by Faltermeyer.

The instrumental version of the song, titled "Jester Flying", was made available when Faltermeyer's complete score for the film was finally released in 2024.

== Critical reception ==
Upon release, Billboard listed the song as a pop pick and stated: "Feverish fast-pulse rock from Top Gun; inclusion in the smash soundtrack should push the band towards its strongest chart bid in years." In his 2017 book Still Competition: The Listener's Guide to Cheap Trick, Robert Lawson described the song as "a piece of soulless, synth-driven corporate rock". In a 2022 retrospective, Brian Truitt of USA Today ranked "Mighty Wings" as the sixth best song on the Top Gun soundtrack. He described the song as a "synth-rocker" which, despite providing a "very different outing" for Cheap Trick, still "manages to showcase some of the band's signature sound even with lyrics about fighter jets".

== In popular culture ==
The song has been credited as an influence on Ken's theme music from the Street Fighter II video game. Composer Yoko Shimomura stated: "I watched the movie before I composed the song, so I can't deny I may have been inspired subconsciously. But I didn't go into it thinking, 'OK I'm gonna make this song sound like 'Mighty Wings'."

== Track listing ==
7" single

1. "Mighty Wings" – 3:50
2. "Dog Fight #3" – 2:39

7" single (Japanese one-sided release)

1. "Mighty Wings" – 3:50

7" single (US promo)

1. "Mighty Wings" – 3:50
2. "Mighty Wings" – 3:50

12" single (US promo)

1. "Mighty Wings" – 3:50
2. "Mighty Wings" – 3:50

== Personnel ==
Cheap Trick

- Robin Zander – lead vocals, rhythm guitar
- Rick Nielsen – lead guitar, backing vocals
- Jon Brant – bass, backing vocals
- Bun E. Carlos – drums, percussion

Additional personnel

- Harold Faltermeyer – producer
- Brian Reeves – engineer
- Michael Dilbeck – executive producer
