= Top Gun (2010 video game) =

- Developer: Doublesix
- Publisher: Paramount Digital Entertainment
- Series: Top Gun
- Platforms: PlayStation 3 Microsoft Windows
- Release: PlayStation 3: NA: August 17, 2010; EU: 2011; Windows; September 14, 2010
- Genre: Combat flight simulation
- Mode: Single-player

Top Gun is a combat flight simulation game developed by Doublesix and published by Paramount Digital Entertainment. It is based on the 1986 film of the same name. It was released on August 17, 2010, as a downloadable game for PlayStation 3 through the PlayStation Network. The following month, it was released for Microsoft Windows through Steam. One of the film's writers, Jack Epps Jr., was involved in the game's development. Epps wrote new combat scenes and dialogue for the game. In 2011, the game and film were released together under the title Top Gun: Wingman Edition.

== Gameplay ==
Top Gun is a combat flight simulation game. It is based on the film of the same name, and it retells the plot of the film, with the player taking control of "Maverick" in an F-14 fighter jet. Top Gun includes several game modes. In the main campaign mode, the player must complete 11 missions. The first mission is a prologue, while the next three are training missions, and the remainder are set over the Indian Ocean. Mission objectives include killing a target, shooting down enemy aircraft, destroying gun emplacements, and escorting a wounded fellow fighter. Weapons includes missiles and a machine gun, and the player's health automatically regenerates after a waiting period. As the game progresses, the player gains access to the F-16 and F/A-18 fighter jets. In Horde mode, the player is given a barrage of enemy aircraft to shoot down. The game includes online multiplayer for up to 16 people, through the PlayStation Network. The game also includes a cover version of Kenny Loggins's song "Danger Zone" from the film. The game includes various trophies that can be won.

== Reception ==
Reception

Aggregate scores
Aggregator	Score
GameRankings	(PS3) 52% (PC) 38%
Metacritic	(PS3) 49/100

Review scores
Publication	Score
1Up.com	(PS3) D
Eurogamer	(PS3) 7/10
GameRevolution	(PS3) C
GameSpot	(PS3) 6.5/10
GameZone	(PS3) 3.5/10
IGN	(PS3) 4.5/10
PlayStation Official Magazine – UK	(PS3) 5/10
PC Gamer (US)	(PC) 38%
Play	(PS3) 53%
Push Square	(PS3) 7/10
Metro	(PS3) 3/10

The PlayStation 3 version received "unfavorable" reviews according to the review aggregation website Metacritic. Arthur Gies of IGN questioned the decision to create a video game based on a 24-year-old film. Cliff Bakehorn of GameZone also questioned whether there was really demand for a new Top Gun game. He concluded that Top Gun was an "overpriced, underwhelming, uninspired, and unceremoniously average" flight combat game. Kristan Reed of Eurogamer praised the game for its "undeniably solid, arcade-style" combat. Carolyn Petit of GameSpot complimented the game for delivering some exciting action when playing as Maverick. Kevin Schaller of GameRevolution praised the large playing environments. Play UK found the gameplay to be "dull", and Mike Cruz of 1Up.com considered the game mediocre.

Reed thought the controls were easy to use, while Cliff Bakehorn criticized their layout. Cruz described the controls as "unnecessarily difficult" and too "loose". Gies stated that Top Gun consisted of the same gameplay that had been used for decades in flight combat games.

The campaign mode was criticized as being repetitive and too short, although Play UK did not mind the short length. Gies wrote that the missions ultimately become exercises in flying. Reviewers noted that there were few people playing the game through online multiplayer, and it was thought that the game would not produce a sizable multiplayer community. Some reviewers praised the graphics, while others criticized them. Gies said that the plane models were good-looking but was critical of the "angular and muddy" environments. Play UK considered the graphics uninspiring.

The voice acting was criticized, and reviewers also noted that Maverick does not speak in the game. Schaller opined that the dialogue felt forced and contrived. Bakehorn stated that the voice actors deliver their lines with no effort or enthusiasm. Cruz was critical of different characters speaking the key lines of dialogue. Gies stated that Epp's involvement in the game was barely noticed. He also wrote that the game takes bits of exposition and dialogue from the film and places them often without any context during the in-mission cutscenes. Petit criticized the "awkward" attempts to "find excuses to shoehorn nearly every memorable line" from the film into the game.
