= Hold My Hand (Lady Gaga song) =

2022 single by Lady Gaga

Single by Lady Gaga

from the album Top Gun: Maverick (Music from the Motion Picture)
- Released: May 3, 2022
- Genre: Arena rock
- Length: 3:45
- Label: Interscope
- Songwriters: Lady Gaga; BloodPop
- Producers: Lady Gaga; BloodPop

Lady Gaga singles chronology
"I Get a Kick Out of You" (2021)	"Hold My Hand" (2022)	"Bloody Mary" (2022)

Music video
- "Hold My Hand" on YouTube

"Hold My Hand" is a song by American singer Lady Gaga, released on May 3, 2022, through Interscope Records. It is the lead single for the movie soundtrack of Top Gun: Maverick (2022). Written and produced by both Gaga and BloodPop, it was self-described as "a love letter to the world during and after a very hard time." An upbeat arena rock track, it features an anthemic chorus and an electric guitar. It drew inspiration from 1980s power ballads, the decade in which the original Top Gun (1986) was released.

"Hold My Hand" received mostly positive critical reviews, emphasizing Gaga's vocals and the song's emotional impact, though there were journalists who found it somewhat underwhelming. In 2023, "Hold My Hand" won the Satellite Award for Best Original Song and was also nominated for the Academy Award for Best Original Song and the Grammy Award for Best Song Written for Visual Media. The track reached the top 10 in multiple European markets and placed within the top 30 in countries such as Australia, Canada, Japan, and the United Kingdom.

The music video for the single, released on May 6, 2022, was directed by Joseph Kosinski, who also helmed Top Gun: Maverick. Partially filmed in black and white, it features Gaga singing in multiple environments while dressed in aviation-themed outfits. The video is intercut with scenes from both the original and 2022 Top Gun films. "Hold My Hand" served as the encore for Gaga's 2022 stadium tour, The Chromatica Ball. She later delivered an acoustic rendition of the song at the 95th Academy Awards ceremony, wearing an uncharacteristically simple outfit. Her performance of the single at the Super Bowl LIX pregame show, supported by a gospel choir, earned her the award for Outstanding Music Direction at the 46th Sports Emmy Awards.

== Announcement and release ==
In April 2021, gossip website ShowBiz 411 reported that Lady Gaga would be involved with the soundtrack for Top Gun: Maverick (2022), the sequel to the 1986 action drama film Top Gun. The rumor soon spread to other publications, including W magazine. In April 2022, Gaga began posting cryptic messages on Twitter, which fans interpreted as lyrics to the rumored song. On April 27, 2022, "Hold My Hand" was officially announced for release, accompanied by cover art which shows Gaga standing in front of aircraft marked with the initials "LG".

A preview of the song was shared on April 30, followed by the release of the full track on May 3 as the first single from the soundtrack for Top Gun: Maverick. A week after the release, "Hold My Hand" received airplay through adult contemporary and contemporary hit radio stations in the US.

The song was later also included on the Japan tour edition of Gaga's fifth solo studio album, Chromatica, as the final track. To celebrate Singles Day 2022, "Hold My Hand" was issued as an Urban Outfitters exclusive 12-inch single, pressed on coke-bottle clear vinyl with etched detailing on the reverse.

== Background and role in Top Gun: Maverick ==
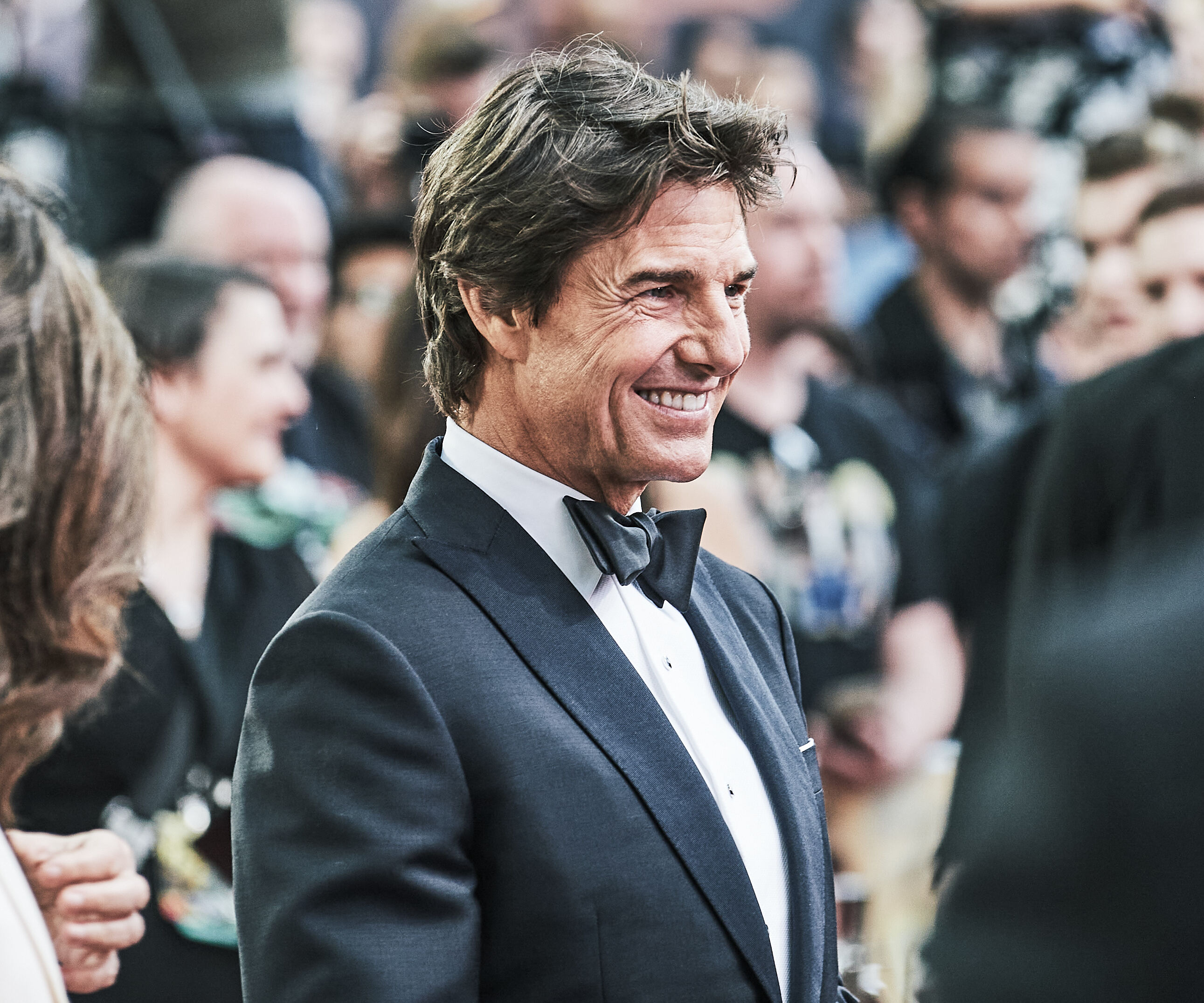
Tom Cruise (pictured at the film's 2022 London premiere) described the song as "the heartbeat" of Top Gun: Maverick.

In development of the soundtrack for the film, other artists were under consideration. Tyler Joseph, frontman of American alternative rock music duo Twenty One Pilots, revealed that he had been working on a song before the release of "Hold My Hand". In an interview, Joseph claimed Tom Cruise, the lead actor and co-producer of film, "came in and just fired everyone." Cruise was satisfied with Gaga's contribution, stating the song "became our score, the heartbeat of the movie." He attributed the song to easing his concerns about the emotional arc, fusing it with the story. He noted it was "a real moment" for the whole team. Ahead of the release, Cruise described "Hold My Hand" as the piece that completed the film's emotional landscape. Composer Lorne Balfe echoed Cruise's remarks. Balfe explained the film lacked an emotional center before Gaga's involvement, and "Hold My Hand" reshaped the musical direction of the score, replacing earlier cues.

The president of motion picture music at Paramount Pictures, Randy Spendlove, had Gaga involved in the film's production from early on, to allow her to co-create the song. She also contributed to the score, with "Hold My Hand" serving as the film's "love theme". Melodic motifs from the track recur throughout Top Gun: Maverick. The theme surfaces in scenes which depict the relationship between the two lead characters. It also features prominently in other emotionally charged scenes which reflect the personal sacrifices the pilots endure. "Hold My Hand" itself appears during a bar scene when Penny, played by Jennifer Connelly, and her daughter are having an intimate conversation. The full track plays near the end of the film as Penny and Maverick, played by Cruise, ride off into the sunset in his P-51 Mustang.

== Writing and composition ==
"Hold My Hand" was co-written by Gaga with the song's main producer, BloodPop, with Benjamin Rice providing additional production work. Gaga developed the song with Bloodpop in the basement studio of her home. Critics in both music and film circles have described the result as a "hopeful, anthemic" arena rock power ballad with the qualities of a torch song. Jazz Tangcay of Variety characterized it as a soaring rock piece, shaped by violins and guitar lines. The track is reminiscent of classic 1980s power ballads.

"Hold My Hand"
A 28-second sample of "Hold My Hand" featuring the final chorus, showcasing an arena rock vibe with driving electric guitars, Gaga's belting, and a key change up to A♭ major.

The lyrics of "Hold My Hand" show Gaga expressing deep care for someone who is hurting, promising to support them unwaveringly and without hesitation. She described it as "a love letter to the world during and after a very hard time," explaining that she wrote it not only for Top Gun: Maverick but also for anyone who feels they will not be okay. Gaga revealed that she had been developing the song for years and "didn't even realize the multiple layers it spanned across the film's heart, my own psyche, and the nature of the world we've been living in" while writing it. Drawing on lessons from her own struggles, the song emphasizes faith in humanity even when self-belief wavers and aims to reach listeners who feel isolated, offering hope that they can ultimately find the strength to stand on their own.

Musically, the arrangement opens with an "atonal, warbling vocal chop" and a piano-led foundation that gradually builds into a larger arena-rock sound, featuring electric guitar, piano, synthesizer elements, and a steady drumbeat, with additional strings in the bridge supporting Gaga's "reverb-soaked" and belted vocal delivery. The song is composed in G major, and in the final chorus, it modulates upward to A♭ major. Lars Brandle of Billboard noted that the song has a close lineage to Berlin's "Take My Breath Away" and Kenny Loggins' "Danger Zone", two tracks from the soundtrack of the original Top Gun (1986). Other journalists have also compared it to songs such as "Open Arms" by Journey (1982), "Alone" by Heart (1987), and Gaga's own 2011 single, "The Edge of Glory". Billboard writer Hannah Dailey contrasted the track with the other original song from Top Gun: Maverick, OneRepublic's "I Ain't Worried", describing the latter as "easygoing" and "Hold My Hand" as marked by a "grief-stricken" sensibility.

== Critical reception ==
"Hold My Hand" received mostly positive reviews from journalists, who praised Gaga's vocals and the song's emotional impact. Robin Murray of Clash called it "a triumph of bombast" that "finds Lady Gaga cutting loose as a vocalist," while Variety's Jazz Tangcay described it as a "catchy earworm", noting its prominent guitar solo and predicting it could be a top contender for an Academy Award for Best Original Song. Nancy Tartaglione from Deadline Hollywood considered it another strong entry in Gaga's and Top Gun's musical canon, also suggesting it could go all the way to the Oscars. Stuart Heritage of The Guardian praised the track for its emotional intensity and classic Gaga power-ballad style.

Critics emphasized that Gaga's performance carries the song. Kristen S. Hé of Vulture noted that while the song is "one of her only pop songs with zero subversive elements," its lyrics consist largely of potential clichés—yet Gaga lifts them with "sheer vocal power", turning "Hold My Hand" into a sincere end-credits ballad. Screen Rant's Benjamin Weiss commended Gaga's "soaring" vocals, noting the track relies more on her performance than on production or instrumentation. Gemma Samways of the Evening Standard and Ross Bonaime of Collider noted that its exaggerated style only works because of Gaga, calling it both "brilliantly overblown" and "cheesy, but effective."

Some reviewers appreciated how the song elevates the movie. Mikael Wood of the Los Angeles Times called it a standout track of 2022, achieving "popcorn nirvana" when paired with the film, even if it "can't hold a Bic lighter to 'Shallow' from A Star Is Born." Stephen Thompson of NPR added that, though the lyrics are simple, they complement the film's cinematic imagery effectively. Peter Travers of ABC News called it the "closest" Top Gun: Maverick "gets to passion", with Gaga "belting her feels full out in an Oscar-ready new theme song". Screen Rant's Erin Edmonson felt the song "rounds out the movie's soundtrack and sends Maverick's story out on a high note."

However, other critics found "Hold My Hand" less compelling. Michael Cragg of The Guardian described it as "mildly underwhelming" and "bloated and saggy", while Adam White of The Independent felt the stadium-sized ballad fell short, noting that Gaga has done "far better with similar ingredients". Alexa Camp of Slant Magazine wrote that despite years of development, the song "struggles to take flight", and NPR's Reanna Cruz remarked that it favors a "motherly, catch-all message of allyship", rather than pushing boundaries. Some critics were even more dismissive: USA Today's Melissa Ruggieri described it as "a middling ballad", NME's Nick Levine called it "tepid", Dallas Observer's Carly May Gravley found it "forgettable, and Gary Grimes of Attitude labeled it "awful".

== Commercial performance ==
Due to being released on a Tuesday, "Hold My Hand" did not enter the United States' Billboard Hot 100. The track entered at No.17 on the Bubbling Under Hot 100, based on three days of tracking. The following week it debuted at No. 82 on the Billboard Hot 100. After the theatrical release of Top Gun: Maverick, the song reached a new peak of No. 49 in its fifth week. The song peaked at No. 19 on the Billboard Mainstream Top 40 chart, No. 12 on the Billboard Adult Pop Airplay chart, and No. 9 on the Billboard Adult Contemporary chart. On the Billboard Global 200 chart, the song debuted at No. 62 following its first full week of availability, peaking in the Top 40 at No. 37.

The single was released at No. 6 in the Canadian Digital Song Sales chart afterthree days of tracking. A week later, the song debuted at No. 38 on the Canadian Hot 100, marking Gaga's 25th Top 40 entry on the Canadian chart. In its sixth week on the chart, the song peaked at No. 25. In Australia, the song debuted at No. 36 on the ARIA Singles Chart, which became Gaga's 30th Top 40 entry. The song peaked at No. 29 in its eighth week on the chart. In New Zealand, the song debuted at No. 33 on the Top 40 Singles Chart following the release of Top Gun: Maverick.

"Hold My Hand" entered the UK singles chart at No. 51 before falling to No. 60 the following week. In its fourth week on the chart, following the theatrical release of Top Gun: Maverick, the song climbed to a new peak position of No. 24. It was the 22nd best-selling song of 2022 in the UK. The song debuted at No. 63 on the Swiss Singles Top 75 chart in its first half week of release but entered the Top 20 the following week after a full week of availability, charting at No. 13. It reached a peak of No. 5. On Belgium's Wallonian Ultratop 50 Singles chart, the song reached a peak of No. 6. In the Netherlands, the song debuted at No. 35 on the Dutch Top 40 chart and at No. 26 on the country's Single Tip chart, on the latter of which it later peaked at No. 1. In France, the song debuted outside the Top 100, at No. 123, reaching the Top Forty, at No. 32, by July of that year. The song was later certified Diamond for more than 330,000 units sold.

== Music video ==
Gaga standing atop her piano in the music video, wearing a billowing parachute-inspired gown, as a plane flies past in the background

The music video for the single was directed by Top Gun: Maverick filmmaker Joseph Kosinski. It was released on May 6, 2022, shortly before the film's premiere. Partially presented in black and white, the video blends footage from Top Gun and Top Gun: Maverick. Featured moments include Tom Cruise as test pilot Maverick repairing his aircraft, riding his motorcycle, and mourning the death of his friend Nick "Goose" Bradshaw, played by Anthony Edwards. These film excerpts are intercut with shots of Lady Gaga singing while playing a grand piano on a military runway, and performing the song inside an airplane hangar.

For the first part of the video, Gaga appears in a white tank top, aviator sunglasses, and the original aviation bomber jacket that Cruise wore in the original Top Gun film. She later changes into a beige gown. During the song's emotional climax, Gaga stands atop her piano while a plane soars by, blowing her gown in the wind. This ensemble was created by Ukrainian designer Lessja Verlingieri for her brand Lever Couture. Verlingieri was approached by long-time collaborator Nicola Formichetti, Gaga's creative director, to design an outfit which would thematically align with the film. The dress took its cues from parachute design, built from approximately 200 yards of fabric and detailed with ropes and a sweeping cape designed to billow in the wind. Verlingieri envisioned Gaga as someone who had wandered the desert for two decades, with the dress symbolizing independence, courage, and endurance.

Gaga said that no CGI was used for the scene in which the plane flies over her head and that the shot required many takes with an actual aircraft. As the video concludes, the sun sets and she raises her hand toward the sky from the piano bench and the plane disappears into the horizon. Critics described the video as "powerful" and "emotional".

== Live performances ==
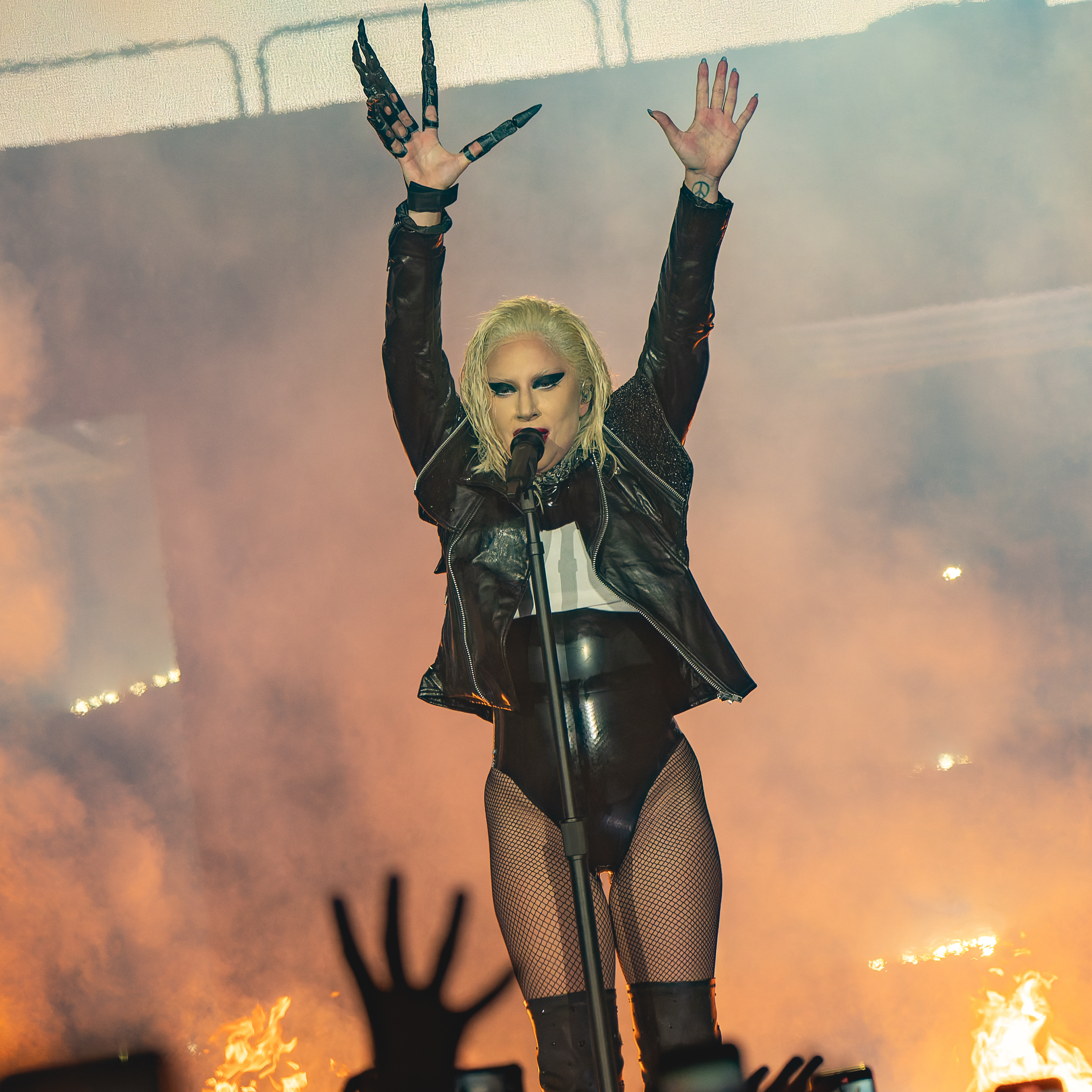
Gaga performing "Hold My Hand" on The Chromatica Ball, 2022

"Hold My Hand" served as the encore on Gaga's 2022 stadium tour, The Chromatica Ball. The performance featured heavy guitar work, pyrotechnics, and Gaga in latex and leather with a metallic claw. Reactions were mixed: some reviewers considered the song a poor choice for an encore or felt it was "a little flat" as a closer, while others praised Gaga's "scorching vocal" and described it as an "exceptional encore." The Guardian's Michael Cragg—who had been lukewarm on the studio version—felt the song resonated more strongly in a stadium. He wrote that removed from the film, it becomes a message to her fans, with its refrain serving as a moment of connection.

It was initially reported that Gaga would skip performing the nominated "Hold My Hand" at the 95th Academy Awards due to filming commitments for Joker: Folie à Deux (2024). However, on March 12, 2023, the same day of the ceremony, she was confirmed as a last-minute addition to the event schedule. Taking the stage without makeup in a plain black shirt and ripped jeans, she introduced the song with a brief monologue about finding heroes in unassuming places. She performed the song supported only by piano, with drums and bass joining slowly throughout the track. The performance was dedicated to Top Gun's late director, Tony Scott. Oscars director Glenn Weiss noted that Gaga aimed for an unadorned rendition, "not as an 'Oscar performance', but as her." Thania Garcia of Variety stated "Hold My Hand" was a "surprisingly rootsy, rock-band production" that was "stripped-down, yet enormously effective". USA Today's Melissa Ruggieri highlighted how Gaga "relied on her mega-vocals", delivering the evening's most emotionally impactful moment.

During the Super Bowl LIX pregame show on February 9, 2025, Gaga sang "Hold My Hand" live in New Orleans, Louisiana. She performed the song as a tribute to the victims of recent US tragedies, including the 2025 New Orleans truck attack, the 2025 California wildfires, and Hurricane Helene. After an inspirational speech by American football player Tom Brady, the camera cut to Gaga, who was seated at a piano in the middle of Bourbon Street, dressed in a wide-brimmed white hat and a long lace gown. She was accompanied by a live band and a local gospel choir. Police officers and firefighters were notably featured in the audience of the performance. Billboard's Stephen Daw called the rendition "moving". The same year, Gaga performed "Hold My Hand" as a surprise song at the first Sydney date of The Mayhem Ball tour, on December 12.

== Accolades ==
"Hold My Hand" received widespread recognition from both the music and film industries. It won the Satellite Award for Best Original Song at the 27th Satellite Awards, marking Gaga's third win in this category, following her 2015 victory with "Til It Happens to You" and her 2018 win for "Shallow".

Other nominations for the song include Best Original Song at the Academy Awards, Best Song Written for Visual Media at the Grammy Awards, Best Original Song – Motion Picture at the Golden Globe Awards, and Best Song at the Critics' Choice Awards. Honors for the song were given by the Georgia Film Critics Association, Japan Gold Disc Awards, and Lumiere Awards. Her live performance of the song at the Super Bowl LIX pregame show won Outstanding Music Direction at the 46th Sports Emmy Awards. With this win, Gaga came one accolade short of achieving EGOT, having already received an Academy Award and multiple Grammy Awards for her earlier music.

Awards and nominations for "Hold My Hand"
Year	Organization	Award	Result	Ref.
2022	Hollywood Music in Media Awards	Best Original Song – Feature Film	Nominated	
2022	People's Choice Awards	Song of 2022	Nominated	
2022	RTHK International Pop Poll Awards	Top Ten International Gold Songs	Nominated	
2022	World Soundtrack Awards	Best Original Song Written Directly for a Film	Nominated	
2023	Academy Awards	Best Original Song	Nominated	
2023	Critics' Choice Awards	Best Song	Nominated	
2023	Georgia Film Critics Association	Best Original Song	Won	
2023	Golden Globe Awards	Best Original Song – Motion Picture	Nominated	
2023	Grammy Awards	Best Song Written for Visual Media	Nominated	
2023	Guild of Music Supervisors Awards	Best Song Written and/or Recorded for a Film	Nominated	
2023	Hollywood Critics Association	Best Original Song	Nominated	
2023	Houston Film Critics Society	Best Original Song	Nominated	
2023	Huading Awards	Best Global Film Song	Nominated	
2023	Japan Gold Disc Awards	Song of the Year by Download (Western)	Won	
2023	Lumiere Awards	Best Original Song	Won	
2023	MTV Movie & TV Awards	Best Song	Nominated	
2023	Satellite Awards	Best Original Song	Won	
2023	Society of Composers & Lyricists	Outstanding Original Song for a Dramatic or Documentary Visual Media Production	Nominated	
2023	Žebřík Music Awards	Best International Composition	Nominated	
2023	Žebřík Music Awards	Best International Music Video	Nominated	
2025	Sports Emmy Awards	Outstanding Music Direction	Won	

== Credits and personnel ==
Credits adapted from Tidal.

- Lady Gaga – vocals, songwriter, producer
- BloodPop – producer, songwriter
- Benjamin Rice – additional producer, mixing
- Tom Norris - mixing
- Randy Merrill - mastering engineer
- Bill Malina - recording engineer
- Tim Stewart - guitar

== Charts ==
=== Weekly charts ===
Weekly chart performance
Chart (2022–2023)	Peak position
Argentina Hot 100 (Billboard)	72
Australia (ARIA)	29
Austria (Ö3 Austria Top 40)	32
Belgium (Ultratop 50 Flanders)	11
Belgium (Ultratop 50 Wallonia)	6
Canada Hot 100 (Billboard)	25
Canada AC (Billboard)	5
Canada CHR/Top 40 (Billboard)	36
Canada Hot AC (Billboard)	18
CIS Airplay (TopHit)	173
Croatia (HRT)	1
Czech Republic Airplay (ČNS IFPI)	18
Czech Republic Singles Digital (ČNS IFPI)	41
Finland Airplay (Radiosoittolista)	12
France (SNEP)	32
France Airplay (SNEP)	1
Germany (GfK)	72
Global 200 (Billboard)	37
Hungary (Single Top 40)	5
Iceland (Tónlistinn)	37
Ireland (IRMA)	49
Italy (FIMI)	57
Japan Hot 100 (Billboard)	29
Netherlands (Dutch Top 40)	28
Netherlands (Single Top 100)	76
New Zealand (Recorded Music NZ)	33
San Marino (SMRRTV Top 50)	11
Singapore (RIAS)	29
Slovakia Airplay (ČNS IFPI)	14
Slovakia Singles Digital (ČNS IFPI)	68
South Africa Streaming (TOSAC)	36
South Korea Download (Circle)	112
Sweden (Sverigetopplistan)	61
Switzerland (Schweizer Hitparade)	5
Taiwan (Billboard)	11
UK Singles (Official Charts)	24
US Billboard Hot 100	49
US Adult Contemporary (Billboard)	9
US Adult Pop Airplay (Billboard)	12
US Pop Airplay (Billboard)	19

=== Year-end charts ===
Year-end chart performance
Chart (2022)	Position
Belgium (Ultratop Flanders)	51
Belgium (Ultratop Wallonia)	26
Canada (Canadian Hot 100)	75
Croatia (HRT)	19
France (SNEP)	124
Global 200 (Billboard)	178
Hungary (Single Top 40)	34
Japan Download Songs (Billboard Japan)	100
Switzerland (Schweizer Hitparade)	39
US Adult Contemporary (Billboard)	16
US Adult Top 40 (Billboard)	37
US Digital Song Sales (Billboard)	19

== Certifications ==
Certifications for "Hold My Hand"
Region	Certification	Certified units/sales
Australia (ARIA)	2× Platinum	140,000^{‡}
Austria (IFPI Austria)	Platinum	30,000^{‡}
Belgium (BRMA)	Gold	20,000^{‡}
Brazil (Pro-Música Brasil)	Platinum	40,000^{‡}
Canada (Music Canada)	Platinum	80,000^{‡}
Denmark (IFPI Danmark)	Gold	45,000^{‡}
France (SNEP)	Diamond	333,333^{‡}
Germany (BVMI)	Gold	300,000^{‡}
Italy (FIMI)	Platinum	100,000^{‡}
New Zealand (RMNZ)	Platinum	30,000^{‡}
Poland (ZPAV)	2× Platinum	100,000^{‡}
Spain (Promusicae)	Gold	30,000^{‡}
Switzerland (IFPI Switzerland)	Platinum	20,000^{‡}
United Kingdom (BPI)	Platinum	600,000^{‡}
^{‡} Sales+streaming figures based on certification alone.

== Release history ==
Release dates and formats for "Hold My Hand"
Region	Date	Format(s)	Label	Ref.
Various	May 3, 2022	Digital download; streaming	Interscope	
Italy	May 6, 2022	Radio airplay	Universal	
United States	May 9, 2022	Adult contemporary radio; hot adult contemporary radio; modern adult contemporary radio	Interscope	
United States	May 10, 2022	Contemporary hit radio	Interscope	
United States	November 11, 2022	12-inch vinyl	Interscope	
