= Cop Out (soundtrack) =

Cop Out: Original Motion Picture Soundtrack

Film score by Harold Faltermeyer
- Released: February 23, 2010
- Recorded: 2009–2010
- Genre: Film score
- Length: 39:01
- Label: WaterTower Music
- Producer: Harold Faltermeyer

Harold Faltermeyer chronology
Two Worlds (2007)	Cop Out (2010)	Top Gun: Maverick (2022)

Cop Out: Original Motion Picture Soundtrack is the soundtrack to the 2010 action comedy film of the same name directed by Kevin Smith, starring Bruce Willis and Tracy Morgan. The film's original score is composed by Harold Faltermeyer which was released by WaterTower Music on February 23, 2010. The album also featured the song "Soul Brothers" by Patti LaBelle.

== Development ==
Smith has been a fan of Faltermeyer's works, who had a clear vision of how the score should sound. Hence, he used most of his scores as temp tracks while editing the film. Faltermeyer described it as both a composer's dream and nightmare in one way or the other, hence did not want to revisit the temp tracks before he is set to score the film. Initially, the executives at Warner Bros. were quite nervous of a vintage sound resembling the 1980s but Faltermeyer eventually zeroed on a style that was "an homage to the '80s combined with a more modern sound". He further designed the score in a way that is rhythm and blues and hip-hop oriented to capture the urban feel of Brooklyn. American musician Sam i worked on contributing loops and sound setting for the film score. The album also featured an original song "Soul Brothers" performed by Patti LaBelle.

== Critical reception ==
Brent Simon of Screen Daily wrote "Harold Faltermeyer's funky, synth-laden score conjures up very specific memories of Beverly Hills Cop's theme song, which, along with self-consciously evocative music choices, give the movie a decidedly nostalgic, '80s-leaning feel." Tony Horkins of GamesRadar+ called it as "kitsch". Chris Bumbray of JoBlo.com wrote "The score is the most memorable thing about the movie, and they even managed to work in the theme song from Fletch, which was one of the few things about the film to put a smile on my face." Ron Hogan of Den of Geek wrote "Even the soundtrack is 80s cop movie, due to the score work of Harold Faltermeyer".

== Track listing ==
Cop Out: Original Motion Picture Soundtrack track listing
No.	Title	Length
1.	"Cop Out"	2:40
2.	"Po Boy Is Bad"	3:00
3.	"Mangold & Hunsacker"	2:13
4.	"Dave"	1:52
5.	"Vicious Drones"	2:29
6.	"Gabriella's Story"	3:14
7.	"Cool Cops"	3:12
8.	"Jealousy, Pt. 1"	2:58
9.	"Shoot'Em"	2:59
10.	"Jealousy, Pt. 2"	2:21
11.	"Brooklyn Car Chase"	2:30
12.	"Night Stakeout"	2:24
13.	"Muy Safe-O"	1:46
14.	"I Love You"	1:03
15.	"Soul Brothers" (featuring Patti LaBelle)	4:20
Total length:		39:01
