= F/A-18 Interceptor =

1988 video game

- Cover art by Simon Roberts
- Developer: Intellisoft
- Publisher: Electronic Arts
- Director: Steven E. Hayes (technical)
- Producer: Richard Hilleman
- Designer: Bob Dinnerman
- Programmer: Bob Dinnerman
- Artist: Greg Johnson
- Composer: David Warhol
- Platform: Amiga
- Release: 1988
- Genre: Air combat simulation
- Mode: Single-player

F/A-18 Interceptor is a combat flight simulator developed by Intellisoft and published by Electronic Arts for the Amiga in 1988. The player mainly flies the F/A-18 Hornet, but the F-16 Fighting Falcon is also available for aerobatics, free flight and the first mission. Contrary to the title of the game, the real F/A-18 is not a true interceptor aircraft, having been designed instead as a multirole anti-ship strike fighter.

== Gameplay ==
The game is set in the San Francisco Bay Area. Notable landmarks include the Golden Gate Bridge, San Francisco–Oakland Bay Bridge and Alcatraz Island. The Electronic Arts headquarters in San Mateo are also depicted. The player can also take off and land from the following airfields: San Francisco International Airport, Oakland International Airport, Moffett Federal Airfield, and USS Enterprise, anchored approximately 20 miles offshore. Finally, when selecting a location to start a free flight, pressing the [0] key starts the player on uninhabited ground far away from the main game area. This is in fact supposed to be Edwards Air Force Base, a location that was not actually implemented in the final game.

Only air-to-air weapons are available, and are limited to AIM-9 Sidewinder missiles, AIM-120 AMRAAM missiles, and the M61 Vulcan Gatling gun (500 rounds). Chaff and flares are available for defense against enemy missiles.

There are six missions, enemies being referred as "terrorists". The first takes place on September 1, 1994. The player must complete a successful carrier landing in order to qualify for the missions:

- Visual Confirmation Mission: An unidentified aircraft has been spotted heading towards San Francisco. The goal is to take off, obtain visual confirmation, and return to base. The briefing states "Do not fire unless fired upon". Usually the aircraft is one or two MiG-29s, but occasionally turns out to be a Boeing 707.
- Emergency Defense Operation: A hostile aircraft is threatening Air Force One. The player must ensure that the President reaches San Francisco safely, shooting down the enemy MiG if necessary.
- Intercept Stolen Aircraft: Two F-16s with secret ECM equipment have been stolen by defecting pilots. Two MiG-29s are providing air support. The player must attempt to force them to return, but if they refuse, the F-16s must be destroyed.
- Search and Rescue Operation: An F/A-18 has been shot down, and the pilot has bailed out near the Farallon Islands. In order to survive he needs a rescue pod dropped from the player's aircraft (by pressing Shift+F). Two or three hostile enemy aircraft are in the area.
- Intercept Incoming Cruise Missile: A cruise missile is heading towards San Francisco and must be destroyed. The difficulty here is the missile's high speed, low altitude (200 feet) and short time available until impact.
- Carrier Sub Mission: Hostilities have broken out, and a submersible aircraft carrier is in the area. Multiple enemy aircraft and the carrier must all be destroyed.

This final mission has become the subject of debate among gamers. It was widely believed that it was impossible to sink the enemy carrier sub, and therefore complete the mission. The game's designer/programmer Robert "Bob" Dinnerman states that it is possible, but that the carrier does not actually blow up if it is deemed destroyed. It is generally accepted that the mission objectives are incorrect, and that it is only necessary to destroy the patrolling enemy aircraft to complete the mission.

Although the missions can each be completed, the game does not feature an ending sequence, or any other indication that it is completed. After completion of the Carrier Sub Mission, the user simply returns to the menu screen, and the Next Active Advanced mission simply loops back to the first mission.

If the user's Amiga has more than 512KB RAM installed, a theme song resembling the "Top Gun Anthem" can be heard. This was at the request of Dinnerman, who asked sound effects engineer Dave Warhol to convey the atmosphere of that particular song from the film Top Gun. There are also bugs left in the game where one can land (and re-take off) on water or upside down on a carrier.

== Reception ==
Dragon gave the game 4 out of 5 stars. The game was given a positive review in Computer Gaming World. The Palm Beach Post called F/A-18 Interceptor "a pretty successful game", approving of the ability to fly the plane during any external view.

In 1996, Computer Gaming World ranked it as the 87th best game of all time, calling it a jet combat sim that set the state-of-the-art for its era.
