= Playing with the Boys =

Single by Kenny Loggins

from the album Top Gun
- Released: August 1986
- Genre: Pop rock; dance-rock
- Length: 3:59 (album version); 4:11 (video version); 6:41 (12" version)
- Label: Columbia
- Songwriters: Kenny Loggins; Peter Wolf; Ina Wolf
- Producer: Peter Wolf

Kenny Loggins singles chronology
"Danger Zone" (1986)	"Playing with the Boys" (1986)	"Meet Me Half Way" (1987)

Music video
- Kenny Loggins – Playing with the Boys on YouTube

"Playing with the Boys" is a song by American singer-songwriter Kenny Loggins for the film Top Gun, featured in the beach volleyball scene toward the middle of the film prior to Maverick's (Tom Cruise) dinner date with Charlie (Kelly McGillis). It is available on both the original 1986 Top Gun soundtrack album and the 1999 expanded edition. The song peaked at No. 60 on the Billboard Hot 100. Loggins re-recorded the song in 2021 featuring Butterfly Boucher.

== Reception ==
Per Loggins's memoir, the song was a hit among gay nightclubs. Spin magazine's interviewer Jonathan Cohen called it "a sort of gay anthem".

== Music video ==
Loggins performs the song in the middle of the men vs. women indoor volleyball game that ends with the women winning by 15–13.
