= List of Billboard 200 number-one albums of 1986 =

The Billboard 200, published in Billboard magazine, is a weekly chart that ranks the 200 highest-selling music albums and EPs in the United States. Before Nielsen SoundScan began tracking sales in 1991, Billboard estimated the sales for the album charts from a representative sampling of record stores nationwide, which was gathered by telephone, fax or messenger service. The data was based on reports from record stores, who ranked the popularity of the best-selling records but did not provide an actual sales figures.

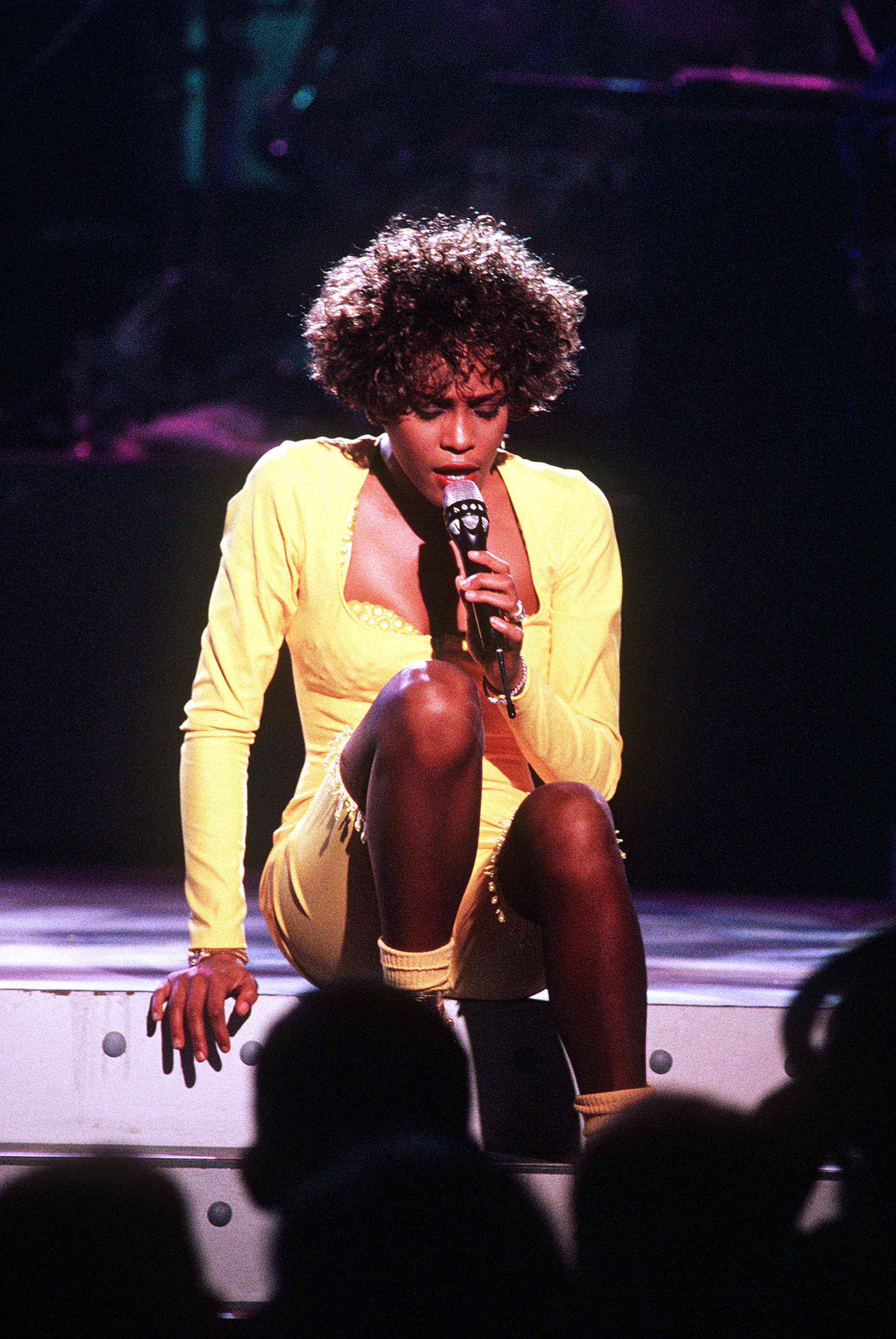
Whitney Houston's self-titled debut album was the best-selling album of 1986, spending 14 non-consecutive weeks at number one.

== Chart history ==
Key
†	Indicates best performing album of 1986

Issue date	Album	Artist(s)	Label	Ref.
January 4	Miami Vice	Soundtrack	MCA	
January 11	Miami Vice	Soundtrack	MCA	
January 18	Miami Vice	Soundtrack	MCA	
January 25	The Broadway Album	Barbra Streisand	Columbia	
February 1	The Broadway Album	Barbra Streisand	Columbia	
February 8	The Broadway Album	Barbra Streisand	Columbia	
February 15	Promise	Sade	Portrait	
February 22	Promise	Sade	Portrait	
March 1	Welcome to the Real World	Mr. Mister	RCA Victor	
March 8	Whitney Houston †	Whitney Houston	Arista	
March 15	Whitney Houston †	Whitney Houston	Arista	
March 22	Whitney Houston †	Whitney Houston	Arista	
March 29	Whitney Houston †	Whitney Houston	Arista	
April 5	Whitney Houston †	Whitney Houston	Arista	
April 12	Whitney Houston †	Whitney Houston	Arista	
April 19	Whitney Houston †	Whitney Houston	Arista	
April 26	5150	Van Halen	Warner Bros.	
May 3	5150	Van Halen	Warner Bros.	
May 10	5150	Van Halen	Warner Bros.	
May 17	Whitney Houston †	Whitney Houston	Arista	
May 24	Whitney Houston †	Whitney Houston	Arista	
May 31	Whitney Houston †	Whitney Houston	Arista	
June 7	Whitney Houston †	Whitney Houston	Arista	
June 14	Whitney Houston †	Whitney Houston	Arista	
June 21	Whitney Houston †	Whitney Houston	Arista	
June 28	Whitney Houston †	Whitney Houston	Arista	
July 5	Control	Janet Jackson	A&M	
July 12	Control	Janet Jackson	A&M	
July 19	Winner in You	Patti LaBelle	MCA	
July 26	Top Gun	Soundtrack	Columbia	
August 2	Top Gun	Soundtrack	Columbia	
August 9	Top Gun	Soundtrack	Columbia	
August 16	True Blue	Madonna	Sire	
August 23	True Blue	Madonna	Sire	
August 30	True Blue	Madonna	Sire	
September 6	True Blue	Madonna	Sire	
September 13	True Blue	Madonna	Sire	
September 20	Top Gun	Soundtrack	Columbia	
September 27	Dancing on the Ceiling	Lionel Richie	Motown	
October 4	Dancing on the Ceiling	Lionel Richie	Motown	
October 11	Top Gun	Soundtrack	Columbia	
October 18	Fore!	Huey Lewis and the News	Chrysalis	
October 25	Slippery When Wet	Bon Jovi	Mercury	
November 1	Third Stage	Boston	MCA	
November 8	Third Stage	Boston	MCA	
November 15	Third Stage	Boston	MCA	
November 22	Third Stage	Boston	MCA	
November 29	Live/1975–85	Bruce Springsteen & The E Street Band	Columbia	
December 6	Live/1975–85	Bruce Springsteen & The E Street Band	Columbia	
December 13	Live/1975–85	Bruce Springsteen & The E Street Band	Columbia	
December 20	Live/1975–85	Bruce Springsteen & The E Street Band	Columbia	
December 27	Live/1975–85	Bruce Springsteen & The E Street Band	Columbia	

== See also ==
- 1986 in music
- List of number-one albums (United States)
