= Top Gun (soundtrack) =

Top Gun: Original Motion Picture Soundtrack

Soundtrack album by various artists
- Released: May 15, 1986
- Genre: various
- Length: 38:38
- Label: Columbia

Singles from Top Gun
- 1. "Danger Zone" Released: April 1986; 2. "Take My Breath Away" Released: June 1986; 3. "Mighty Wings" Released: June 1986; 4. "Heaven in Your Eyes" Released: July 1986; 5. "Playing with the Boys" Released: August 1986; 6. "Hot Summer Nights" Released: 1986; 7. "Top Gun Anthem" Released: 1986; 8. "Lead Me On" Released: 1986

Professional ratings
Review scores
Source	Rating
AllMusic	3/5 stars

Top Gun: Original Motion Picture Soundtrack is the soundtrack from the film of the same name, released in 1986 by Columbia Records.

The album reached number one in the US charts for five nonconsecutive weeks in the summer and autumn of 1986. It was the best selling soundtrack of 1986 and one of the best selling of all time. The song "Take My Breath Away" by Berlin went on to win both the Academy Award for Best Original Song and the Golden Globe Award for Best Original Song. According to Allmusic, the album "remains a quintessential artifact of the mid-'80s", and the album's hits "still define the bombastic, melodramatic sound that dominated the pop charts of the era."

In 1999, the album was reissued as a "Special Expanded Edition" with additional songs, and in 2006, it was reissued again as Music From and Inspired by Top Gun: Deluxe Edition, containing additional songs not in the film. In March 2024, soundtrack specialist label La-La Land Records released a limited edition (5000 copies) double CD containing Harold Faltermeyer's entire original score with the second disc containing all the songs from the classic soundtrack, the additional songs featured in the film but not released until the Special Expanded Edition and, for the first time since its appearance on the B-side of "Take My Breath Away", "Radar Radio" by Giorgio Moroder and Joe Pizzulo, briefly heard in the film's final scene playing on a radio before Maverick and Charlie are reunited while "You've Lost That Lovin' Feelin'" plays on the jukebox. In 2024, the soundtrack was included in Rolling Stone's list of the 101 Greatest Soundtracks of All Time.

== Other artists considered ==
Toto was originally intended to perform the track "Danger Zone", but legal conflicts between the film's producers and the band's lawyers prevented this. Bryan Adams was approached to perform it, but refused any involvement in the film, feeling that it glorified war and, as such, not wanting any of his work linked to it. Adams also refused to allow his song "Only the Strong Survive" to be featured in the film. REO Speedwagon was approached but declined, due to not being allowed to contribute any of their own compositions to the soundtrack. Corey Hart also declined, preferring to write and perform his own compositions. Eventually, the film's producers agreed that "Danger Zone" would be recorded and performed by Kenny Loggins.

Members of Toto also wrote and intended to perform a song called "Only You" that would have been used as the film's love theme instead of "Take My Breath Away", but legal conflicts prevented doing so. The Motels were originally considered to perform "Take My Breath Away", and a demo version exists on their 2001 compilation Anthologyland.

Judas Priest was also approached to allow their song "Reckless" in the film but declined when the proposed contract stipulated that the filmmakers have exclusive rights to the song, which would have necessitated the band omitting the song from their forthcoming album Turbo (1986). Former Judas Priest guitarist K.K. Downing later called their opting out of the film "a big mistake". The band offered the producers three other songs for the soundtrack, all of which were rejected.

ABC members Martin Fry and Mark White were invited to see the director's rough cut version of Top Gun in 1986. "They were looking to offer a few British bands soundtrack opportunities. Mark and I weren't impressed with the film and chose not to contribute any music to it."

Bobby Blotzer of Ratt proposed using the song "Reach for the Sky", an outtake from Ratt's 1984 album Out of the Cellar. Although the rest of the band seriously considered the idea, they declined under the belief that their long-time fans would not like the song and would accuse the group of selling out. Although the song title "Reach for the Sky" would become the title of the band's 1988 album, the track itself was never officially released until 2024, being remastered and finally released in honour of the 40th anniversary of Out of the Cellar.

The Cars' song "Stranger Eyes" (from their 1984 album Heartbeat City) was featured in an early teaser trailer for the film, though it was absent from the film's final cut.

== Track listing ==
Side one
No.	Title	Writer(s)	Performer	Length
1.	"Danger Zone"	Giorgio Moroder; Tom Whitlock	Kenny Loggins	3:36
2.	"Mighty Wings"	Harold Faltermeyer; Mark Spiro	Cheap Trick	3:51
3.	"Playing with the Boys"	Kenny Loggins; Peter Wolf; Ina Wolf	Kenny Loggins	3:59
4.	"Lead Me On"	Moroder; Whitlock	Teena Marie	3:47
5.	"Take My Breath Away"	Moroder; Whitlock	Berlin	4:11

Side two
No.	Title	Writer(s)	Performer	Length
1.	"Hot Summer Nights"	Michael Jay; Alan Roy Scott; Roy Freeland	Miami Sound Machine	3:38
2.	"Heaven in Your Eyes"	Paul Dean; Mike Reno; John Dexter; Mae Moore	Loverboy	4:04
3.	"Through the Fire"	Moroder; Whitlock	Larry Greene	3:46
4.	"Destination Unknown"	Franne Golde; Paul Fox; Jake Hooker	Marietta	3:48
5.	"Top Gun Anthem"	Faltermeyer	Harold Faltermeyer; Steve Stevens	4:12

1999 Special Expanded Edition bonus tracks
No.	Title	Writer(s)	Performer	Length
11.	"(Sittin' On) The Dock of the Bay"	Steve Cropper; Otis Redding	Otis Redding	2:42
12.	"Memories"	Harold Faltermeyer	Harold Faltermeyer	2:57
13.	"Great Balls of Fire" (original version)	Jack Hammer; Otis Blackwell	Jerry Lee Lewis	1:57
14.	"You've Lost That Lovin' Feelin'"	Barry Mann; Phil Spector; Cynthia Weil	The Righteous Brothers	3:44
15.	"Playing with the Boys" (dance mix)	Loggins; P. Wolf; I. Wolf	Kenny Loggins	6:41

=== Music from and Inspired by Top Gun: Deluxe Edition ===
In 2006, the "Special Expanded Edition" was repackaged in the UK with five additional songs "not included in the motion picture".

No.	Title	Writer(s)	Performer	Length
16.	"Can't Fight This Feeling"	Kevin Cronin	REO Speedwagon	4:54
17.	"Broken Wings"	Richard Page; Steve George; John Lang	Mr. Mister	4:24
18.	"The Final Countdown"	Joey Tempest	Europe	3:58
19.	"Nothing's Gonna Stop Us Now"	Albert Hammond; Diane Warren; Richard Hulle	Starship	4:25
20.	"The Power of Love"	Gunther Mende; Candy DeRouge; Jennifer Rush; Mary Susan Applegate	Jennifer Rush	4:27

== Charts ==
=== Weekly charts ===
1986 weekly chart performance for Top Gun
Chart (1986)	Peak position
Australian Albums (Kent Music Report)	3
Austrian Albums (Ö3 Austria)	2
Canada Top Albums/CDs (RPM)	2
Dutch Albums (Album Top 100)	5
European Albums (Music & Media)	2
Finnish Albums (Suomen virallinen lista)	1
German Albums (Offizielle Top 100)	1
Icelandic Albums (Tónlist)	2
Italian Albums (Musica e dischi)	6
New Zealand Albums (RMNZ)	5
Norwegian Albums (VG-lista)	7
Swedish Albums (Sverigetopplistan)	3
Swiss Albums (Schweizer Hitparade)	1
UK Albums (Official Charts)	4
US Billboard 200	1

1994 weekly chart performance for Top Gun
Chart (1994)	Peak position
UK Compilation Albums (Official Charts)	25

2006 weekly chart performance for Top Gun
Chart (2006)	Peak position
UK Soundtrack Albums (Official Charts)	2

2019–2022 weekly chart performance for Top Gun
Chart (2019–2022)	Peak position
Belgian Albums (Ultratop Flanders)	35
Belgian Albums (Ultratop Wallonia)	97
Japanese Albums (Oricon)	19
Japanese Hot Albums (Billboard Japan)	10
Polish Albums (ZPAV)	46

=== Year-end charts ===
1986 year-end chart performance for Top Gun
Chart (1986)	Position
Australian Albums (Kent Music Report)	19
Austrian Albums (Ö3 Austria)	22
Canada Top Albums/CDs (RPM)	8
Dutch Albums (Album Top 100)	43
European Albums (Music & Media)	13
German Albums (Offizielle Top 100)	21
New Zealand Albums (RMNZ)	43
Swiss Albums (Schweizer Hitparade)	14
UK Albums (Gallup)	27
US Billboard 200	21
US Soundtrack Albums (Billboard)	1

1987 year-end chart performance for Top Gun
Chart (1987)	Position
Australian Albums (Kent Music Report)	74
Austrian Albums (Ö3 Austria)	25
Canada Top Albums/CDs (RPM)	66
European Albums (Music & Media)	82
US Billboard 200	30
US Soundtrack Albums (Billboard)	1

== Certifications ==
Certifications for Top Gun
Region	Certification	Certified units/sales
Australia (ARIA)	5× Platinum	350,000^{‡}
Canada (Music Canada)	5× Platinum	500,000^{^}
Finland (Musiikkituottajat)	Gold	29,553
France (SNEP)	2× Platinum	600,000^{*}
Germany (BVMI)	Platinum	800,000
Hong Kong (IFPI Hong Kong)	Platinum	20,000^{*}
Italy (FIMI) sales since 2009	Gold	25,000^{‡}
Japan (RIAJ) 1989 release	2× Platinum	400,000^{^}
Netherlands (NVPI)	Gold	50,000^{^}
New Zealand (RMNZ)	Platinum	15,000^{‡}
Switzerland (IFPI Switzerland)	2× Platinum	100,000^{^}
United Kingdom (BPI)	2× Platinum	600,000^{^}
United States (RIAA)	9× Platinum	9,000,000^{^}
^{*} Sales figures based on certification alone.^{^} Shipments figures based on certification alone.^{‡} Sales+streaming figures based on certification alone.
