= Top Gun: Maverick (soundtrack) =

2022 soundtrack album

Top Gun: Maverick (Music from the Motion Picture)

Soundtrack album by Lorne Balfe, Harold Faltermeyer, Lady Gaga, and Hans Zimmer
- Released: May 27, 2022
- Genres: Film score; soundtrack
- Length: 43:35
- Labels: Interscope; Paramount
- Producers: BloodPop; Lady Gaga; Brent Kutzle; Giorgio Moroder; John Nathaniel; Simon Oscroft; Benjamin Rice; Tyler Spry; Ryan Tedder; Lorne Balfe

Lorne Balfe chronology
Ambulance (2022)	Top Gun: Maverick (2022)	Secret Headquarters (2022)

Harold Faltermeyer chronology
Cop Out (2010)	Top Gun: Maverick (2022)

Lady Gaga chronology
Love for Sale (2021)	Top Gun: Maverick (2022)	Harlequin (2024)

Hans Zimmer chronology
The Unforgivable (2021)	Top Gun: Maverick (2022)	The Son (2022)

Singles from Top Gun: Maverick
- 1. "Hold My Hand" Released: May 3, 2022; 2. "I Ain't Worried" Released: May 13, 2022

Top Gun: Maverick (Music from the Motion Picture) is the soundtrack to the 2022 action film Top Gun: Maverick by Lorne Balfe, Harold Faltermeyer, Lady Gaga, and Hans Zimmer. (Note: The album is credited to its four main composers—Lorne Balfe, Harold Faltermeyer, Lady Gaga, and Hans Zimmer—on its front cover and digital platforms. However, none is individually credited by all charts and certifying bodies, and the album is listed as by "various artists" or "soundtrack" instead.) It consists of the film's score as well as two original songs, "Hold My Hand" by Gaga and "I Ain't Worried" by OneRepublic, which were released as singles prior to the album. The soundtrack contains the song "Danger Zone" by Kenny Loggins, which was also featured in the first film. The soundtrack was released on May 27, 2022, by Interscope Records and Paramount Music through digital and physical formats.

== Development ==
By June 2017, Top Gun composer Harold Faltermeyer had returned to score for the sequel. Later, in October 2018, Hans Zimmer joined Faltermeyer to score for the film, accompanied by Lorne Balfe and Lady Gaga also joining the film later. Zimmer produced a new original theme for the film that was featured in the February 2022 trailer, and was played by guitarist Johnny Marr. Marr claimed that the theme was "completely accidental" and did not watch the preview of the film before scoring. Speaking in an interview to Variety, Marr said "I think there was some issue with how the theme was sounding, and I was around and I have a guitar. It really was as simple as that." Twenty One Pilots frontman Tyler Joseph said that their band was reported to feature in the soundtrack, before Tom Cruise ousted them. He revealed in an interview that "I was working with the music placement person for the new Top Gun on writing a new song for them, and then I believe Tom Cruise came in and just fired everyone," Joseph also noted, "It was actually pretty soon after they brought me in to show me parts of the movie and what they were looking for and stuff. Then I got word that there was like a wholesale swap." Musician Kenny Loggins confirmed that his song "Danger Zone", which was used in the first film, will be featured in the sequel with an updated version. "Great Balls of Fire", another song from the first film performed by Jerry Lee Lewis, was also featured in the sequel. The song is performed by Miles Teller, who plays Lt. Bradley "Rooster" Bradshaw.

On April 27, 2022, Gaga announced that she had written and recorded the song "Hold My Hand", which would serve as the film's theme song, in addition to producing the score. Gaga said that she worked on the song for years, and "didn't even realize the multiple layers it spanned across the film's heart, my own psyche, and the nature of the world we've been living in" while writing it. The song, released as a single on May 3, 2022, was co-written with Benjamin Rice and BloodPop. Another single, "I Ain't Worried" by OneRepublic was released on May 13. It was sent to contemporary hit radio in the United States on June 21, 2022. The soundtrack album was released on May 27, 2022, by Interscope Records.

== Reception ==
The soundtrack received generally positive reviews, with Pete Hammond of Deadline Hollywood, Brian Lloyd of Entertainment.ie, Tomris Larfy of RogerEbert.com and Chris Bumbray of JoBlo.com calling the score composed by Faltermeyer, Gaga, Balfe and Zimmer as "one of the positive aspects of the film". Zanobard Reviews stated "the soundtrack of Top Gun: Maverick is a thoroughly entertaining and incredibly nostalgic musical experience from beginning to end". Marcy Donelson of AllMusic gave the album 3 out of 5 stars, and picked "Main Titles (You've Been Called Back to Top Gun)" and "The Man, The Legend / Touchdown" as the score's highlights.

== Track listing ==
All performed by Lorne Balfe, Harold Faltermeyer, Lady Gaga, and Hans Zimmer except where noted.

Top Gun: Maverick (Music from the Motion Picture) track listing
No.	Title	Writer(s)	Artist(s)	Length
1.	"Main Titles (You've Been Called Back to Top Gun)"	Harold Faltermeyer		2:30
2.	"Danger Zone"	Giorgio Moroder; Tom Whitlock	Kenny Loggins	3:36
3.	"Darkstar"	Faltermeyer; Lorne Balfe		3:01
4.	"Great Balls of Fire" (live)	Otis Blackwell; Jack Hammer	Miles Teller	1:55
5.	"You're Where You Belong / Give 'Em Hell"	Hans Zimmer; BloodPop; Lady Gaga		5:46
6.	"I Ain't Worried"	Ryan Tedder; Brent Kutzle; Tyler Spry; John Eriksson; Peter Morén; Björn Yttling	OneRepublic	2:28
7.	"Dagger One Is Hit / Time to Let Go"	Faltermeyer; Zimmer; Balfe; Max Aruj		5:06
8.	"Tally Two / What's the Plan / F-14"	Andrew Kawczynski; Zimmer; Balfe		4:34
9.	"The Man, the Legend / Touchdown"	Zimmer; Faltermeyer; BloodPop; Gaga		3:54
10.	"Penny Returns" (interlude)	Zimmer; BloodPop; Gaga		2:47
11.	"Hold My Hand"	Gaga; BloodPop	Lady Gaga	3:45
12.	"Top Gun Anthem"	Faltermeyer	Harold Faltermeyer; Stuart Michael Thomas	2:28
Total length:				43:35

Japanese CD release bonus track
No.	Title	Length
13.	"Canyon Dogfight"	3:20
Total length:		46:55

Songs not included in the soundtrack, but featured in the film include the following:

- Hank Williams – "Your Cheatin' Heart" – Plays at the small town diner after Maverick crashes the Darkstar
- David Bowie – "Let's Dance" – Plays on jukebox at the Hard Deck bar
- T. Rex – "Bang a Gong (Get It On)" – Plays on jukebox at the bar
- Otis Redding and Carla Thomas – "Tramp" – Plays on jukebox at the bar when Rooster first appears
- Foghat – "Slow Ride" – Plays on jukebox at the bar, as selected by Hangman
- The Who – "Won't Get Fooled Again" – Plays on the first training montage

== Personnel ==
Personnel credits adapted from Film Music Reporter.

- Supervising music editor: Cecile Tournesac
- Music editor: Ryan Rubin
- Additional music editorial: Peter Myles, Mikael Sandgren
- Music consultants: Jason Bentley, T Bone Burnett, Kathy Nelson, Ryan Tedder
- Additional music: David Fleming, Andrew Kawczynski, Steve Mazzaro
- Additional arrangements: Steve Davis, Sven Faulconer, Stuart Michael Thomas, Max Aruj, Steffen Thum
- Featured musicians:
  - Bass: Nico Abondolo, Trey Henry
  - Cello: Tina Guo, Ro Rowan
  - French horn: Dylan S. Hart
  - Trumpet: Thomas Hooten
  - Electric guitar: Lexii Lynn Frazier, Stuart Michael Thomas
  - Drums: Chad Smith
  - Violin: Ben Powell
- Score consultant: Guthrie Govan
- Orchestrations: Bruce Fowler, Walt Fowler, David Giuli, Jennifer Hammond, Yvonne Suzette Moriarty, Booker White
- Music preparation: Booker White
- Orchestral contractor: Peter Rotter
- Score mixing: Al Clay, Stephen Lipson
- Score mix assistant: Alvin Wee
- Sequencer programming: Omer Benyamin, Steven Doar
- Technical score engineer: Chuck Choi
- Technical assistants: Alejandro Moros, Alex Lamy, Fabio Marks, Jim Grimwade, Aldo Arechar, Kevin Anderson, Florian Faltermeyer, Alfie Godfrey, Michael Bitton
- Synth programming: Hans Zimmer, Lorne Balfe
- Synth design: Kevin Schroeder
- Digital instrument design: Mark Wherry
- Digital instrument preparation: Taurees Habib, Raul Vega
- Music production services: Steven Kofsky
- Score coordinators: Shalini Singh, Queenie Li
- Mastering engineer: Emerson Mancini

== Charts ==
=== Weekly charts ===
Weekly chart performance for Top Gun: Maverick (Music from the Motion Picture)
Chart (2022)	Peak position
Australian Albums (ARIA)	11
Austrian Albums (Ö3 Austria)	7
Belgian Albums (Ultratop Flanders)	18
Belgian Albums (Ultratop Wallonia)	15
Canadian Albums (Billboard)	23
Croatian International Albums (HDU)	12
Czech Albums (ČNS IFPI)	58
Dutch Albums (Album Top 100)	85
Finnish Albums (Suomen virallinen lista)	20
French Albums (SNEP)	17
German Albums (Offizielle Top 100)	16
Ireland Compilation Albums (OCC)	3
Italian Albums (FIMI)	74
Japanese Albums (Oricon)	2
Japanese Combined Albums (Oricon)	4
Japanese Hot Albums (Billboard Japan)	4
Lithuanian Albums (AGATA)	22
New Zealand Albums (RMNZ)	16
Norwegian Albums (VG-lista)	7
Polish Albums (ZPAV)	19
Portuguese Compilation Albums (AFP)	1
South Korean Albums (Circle)	60
Spanish Albums (Promusicae)	57
Swiss Albums (Schweizer Hitparade)	3
UK Compilation Albums (Official Charts)	1
UK Soundtrack Albums (Official Charts)	1
US Billboard 200	17
US Soundtrack Albums (Billboard)	2

=== Monthly charts ===
Monthly chart performance for Top Gun: Maverick (Music from the Motion Picture)
Chart (2022)	Peak position
Japanese Albums (Oricon)	10

=== Year-end charts ===
2022 year-end chart performance for Top Gun: Maverick (Music from the Motion Picture)
Chart (2022)	Position
Austrian Albums (Ö3 Austria)	68
Belgian Albums (Ultratop Flanders)	138
Belgian Albums (Ultratop Wallonia)	144
French Albums (SNEP)	70
Japanese Albums (Oricon)	67
Japanese Hot Albums (Billboard Japan)	47
Swiss Albums (Schweizer Hitparade)	29
US Billboard 200	163
US Soundtrack Albums (Billboard)	7

2023 year-end chart performance for Top Gun: Maverick (Music from the Motion Picture)
Chart (2023)	Position
French Albums (SNEP)	125
US Soundtrack Albums (Billboard)	5

2024 year-end chart performance for Top Gun: Maverick (Music from the Motion Picture)
Chart (2024)	Position
US Soundtrack Albums (Billboard)	21

== Certifications ==
Certifications for Top Gun: Maverick (Music from the Motion Picture)
Region	Certification	Certified units/sales
Denmark (IFPI Danmark)	Gold	10,000^{‡}
France (SNEP)	Platinum	100,000^{‡}
Italy (FIMI)	Gold	25,000^{‡}
New Zealand (RMNZ)	Platinum	15,000^{‡}
Switzerland (IFPI Switzerland)	Gold	10,000^{‡}
United Kingdom (BPI)	Silver	60,000^{‡}
^{‡} Sales+streaming figures based on certification alone.

== Release history ==
Release dates and formats for Top Gun: Maverick (Music from the Motion Picture)
Region	Date	Format(s)	Label	Ref.
Various	May 27, 2022	CD; digital download; streaming	Interscope	
Various	November 18, 2022	Vinyl	Interscope	
