= Danger Zone (song) =

1986 single by Kenny Loggins

Single by Kenny Loggins

from the album Top Gun
- B-side: "I'm Gonna Do It Right"
- Released: April 24, 1986
- Recorded: January 1986
- Genre: Hard rock; pop rock; synth-pop
- Length: 3:36
- Label: Columbia
- Composer: Giorgio Moroder
- Lyricist: Tom Whitlock
- Producer: Giorgio Moroder

Kenny Loggins singles chronology
"I'll Be There" (1985)	"Danger Zone" (1986)	"Playing with the Boys" (1986)

Music video
- "Danger Zone" on YouTube

"Danger Zone" is a song recorded by American singer-songwriter Kenny Loggins in 1986, with music composed by Giorgio Moroder and lyrics written by Tom Whitlock. The song was one of the hit singles from the soundtrack to the 1986 American film Top Gun. It was the best-selling soundtrack of 1986 and one of the best-selling of all time. According to Allmusic.com, the album "remains a quintessential artifact of the mid-'80s" and the album's hits "still define the bombastic, melodramatic sound that dominated the pop charts of the era". The song is also featured in the 2022 sequel film Top Gun: Maverick and its soundtrack, using the same original recording.

== Background ==
The first chorus and partial second verse of "Danger Zone"

Film producers Jerry Bruckheimer and Don Simpson, along with music supervisor Michael Dilbeck, had over 300 songs to employ on Top Gun. They tested compositions against the dailies of the opening scenes at the aircraft carrier. Nothing satisfied them and Bruckheimer asked soundtrack producer Giorgio Moroder to write something. With the help of songwriter Tom Whitlock, he composed "Danger Zone" and had Joe Pizzulo record a demo. With the approval of the producers, soundtrack distributor Columbia Records requested Moroder to have "Danger Zone" performed by an artist signed by the label. Pizzulo's original demo version would later make a partial appearance in the 1987 TV movie Cracked Up.

The band Toto was originally intended to perform the track, but legal conflicts between the producers of Top Gun and the band's lawyers prevented this. According to Steve Lukather, they were told that only Joseph Williams' vocals would be used when the band sent their version to the producers. Toto deemed that decision unacceptable and pulled out. In a 2022 interview with AXS TV, Kenny Loggins revealed that it was Jefferson Starship that was the first act to be offered the track, but the band withdrew from the project.

Corey Hart was also approached to perform "Danger Zone". He declined, preferring to write and perform his own compositions. According to Loggins in the 2022 interview, Kevin Cronin from REO Speedwagon also declined the offer for the soundtrack, because the notes were too high for him.

Eventually the film producers offered the song to Loggins who would recall his assent to recording "Danger Zone" as "a very snap judgement". After Whitlock went to Loggins, the singer added his own improvisations and reached number 2 on the Billboard Hot 100. "Danger Zone" was kept out of the number 1 spot by Peter Gabriel's "Sledgehammer". It became Loggins' second-highest chart hit after his 1984 number 1 hit "Footloose". In a 2008 interview, Loggins said that "Danger Zone" does not represent him as an artist.

In 2018, Loggins told TMZ that he was having discussions with the film's lead actor Tom Cruise about having a new version of the song featured in the then-upcoming film Top Gun: Maverick. Ultimately the original recording was used instead. Loggins stated that Cruise wanted to invoke the same feelings listening to the song as with the original Top Gun.

== Composition ==
The song is written in Eb minor in common time signature with a fast tempo of 157 beats per minute.

== Overview ==
Dann Huff, singer and guitarist of the 1980s hard rock group Giant, played guitar on the song. The bass line is performed on a Yamaha DX7 synthesizer. A tenor saxophone is added near the end of the song.

The song peaked at number two on the US Billboard Hot 100 for a week in July 1986.

== Music video ==
A music video was released in May 1986 to promote the single. The video was directed by Tony Scott and featured footage of Loggins singing, as well as clips from the film Top Gun, which Scott also directed.

== Personnel ==
- Kenny Loggins – vocals and rhythm guitar
- Dann Huff – lead guitar
- Giorgio Moroder – synthesizers, sequencer and drum machine
- Tom Whitlock – synthesizer
- Tom Scott – saxophone

== Charts ==
=== Weekly charts ===
Weekly chart performance for "Danger Zone"
Chart (1986–1987)	Peak position
Australia (Kent Music Report)	14
Canada (RPM)	7
Germany (GfK Entertainment Charts)	12
New Zealand (Recorded Music NZ)	12
Switzerland (Schweizer Hitparade)	6
UK Singles (Official Charts)	45
US Billboard Hot 100	2
US Cashbox Top 100	4
US Billboard Album Rock Tracks	7

2022 weekly chart performance for "Danger Zone"
Chart (2022)	Peak position
Australia (ARIA)	79
Canada Digital Song Sales (Billboard)	16
Global 200 (Billboard)	130
Hungary (Single Top 40)	13
Ireland (IRMA)	90
Japan (Japan Hot 100)	100
New Zealand Hot Singles (RMNZ)	13
US Digital Song Sales (Billboard)	7

=== Year-end charts ===
Year-end chart performance for "Danger Zone"
Chart (1986)	Peak position
Australia (Kent Music Report)	62
US Top Pop Singles (Billboard)	42

== Certifications ==
Certifications for "Danger Zone"
Region	Certification	Certified units/sales
Australia (ARIA)	4× Platinum	280,000^{‡}
Denmark (IFPI Danmark)	Platinum	90,000^{‡}
Germany (BVMI)	Gold	300,000^{‡}
Japan (RIAJ) Digital single	Platinum	250,000^{*}
New Zealand (RMNZ)	2× Platinum	60,000^{‡}
United Kingdom (BPI)	Platinum	600,000^{‡}
^{*} Sales figures based on certification alone.^{‡} Sales+streaming figures based on certification alone.

== Use in US politics ==
AI-generated video of Donald Trump flying a jet and dropping fecal matter on protesting crowds posted to Truth Social on the same day as the protests. "Danger Zone" was used as the background music.

Kenny Loggins expressed displeasure with the use of his recording of the song in a video of an AI-generated animated rendering of President Donald Trump in a fighter jet bombing No Kings protesters with what appears to be fecal matter. Loggins said of the video: "This is an unauthorized use of my performance of 'Danger Zone.' Nobody asked me for my permission, which I would have denied, and I request that my recording on this video is removed immediately. I can't imagine why anybody would want their music used or associated with something created with the sole purpose of dividing us. Too many people are trying to tear us apart, and we need to find new ways to come together. We're all Americans, and we're all patriotic. There is no 'us and them' – that's not who we are, nor is it what we should be. It's all of us. We're in this together, and it is my hope that we can embrace music as a way of celebrating and uniting each and every one of us."
