= List of songs in Lips =

Lips is a 2008 karaoke video game for the Xbox 360 developed by iNiS and published by Microsoft Game Studios. The game's soundtrack is localized for different countries, though the versions share many tracks. With the exception of the Scandinavian release, each version of the game contains 40 on-disc master tracks. Lips also supports downloadable content through the Xbox Live Marketplace.

== On-disc songs ==
The following is a list of songs that appear on-disc in any version of Lips. Some songs are available on-disc in some locales and as downloadable content in others. Other songs are only available in certain locales and cannot be downloaded.

Song Title	Artist	(United States)	(United Kingdom) (Republic of Ireland) (Netherlands)	(Spain) (Mexico)	(France) (Hong Kong) (Singapore)	(Germany)	(Italy)	(Denmark) (Finland) (Norway) (Sweden)	(Australia) (New Zealand)
"36 Grad"	2raumwohnung	✗	✗	✗	✗	✓	✗	✗	✗
"Take On Me"	a-ha	✓	✓ (DLC)	✓ (DLC)	✓	✓ (DLC)	✓	✓	✓ (DLC)
"The Sign"	Ace of Base	✓ (DLC)	✓ (DLC)	✓	✓	✓	✓	✓	✓
"¿A quién le importa?"	Alaska y Dinarama	✗	✗	✓	✗	✗	✗	✗	✗
"Corazón Partío"	Alejandro Sanz	✗	✗	✓	✗	✗	✗	✗	✗
"No One"	Alicia Keys	✓	✓	✓	✓	✓	✓	✓	✓
"Potential Breakup Song"	Aly & AJ	✓	✗	✗	✗	✗	✗	✗	✗
"Flaca"	Andrés Calamaro	✗	✗	✓	✗	✗	✗	✗	✗
"Complicated"	Avril Lavigne	✓	✗	✓	✓	✓	✓	✓	✓
"Walk Like an Egyptian"	The Bangles	✓	✗	✗	✓	✗	✓	✓	✓
"Song for Whoever"	The Beautiful South	✓ (DLC)	✓	✓ (DLC)	✓ (DLC)	✓ (DLC)	✓ (DLC)	✓ (DLC)	✓ (DLC)
"Baila Mi Corazón"	Belanova	✗	✗	✓	✗	✗	✗	✗	✗
"Stand by Me"	Ben E. King	✓	✓	✓	✓	✗	✓	✓	✓
"Irreplaceable"	Beyoncé	✓	✓	✓	✓	✓	✗	✗	✓
"Call Me"	Blondie	✓	✓	✗	✓	✓	✓	✓	✓
"Boogie 2nite"	Booty Luv	✗	✓	✗	✗	✗	✗	✗	✗
"No Promises"	Bryan Rice	✗	✗	✗	✗	✗	✗	✓	✗
"It's Not The Fall That Hurts"	Caesars	✓ (DLC)	✓ (DLC)	✓ (DLC)	✓ (DLC)	✓ (DLC)	✓ (DLC)	✓	✓ (DLC)
"Erase/Rewind"	The Cardigans	✓ (DLC)	✓ (DLC)	✓ (DLC)	✓ (DLC)	✓ (DLC)	✓ (DLC)	✓	✓ (DLC)
"Completamente"	Chetes	✗	✗	✓	✗	✗	✗	✗	✗
"With You"	Chris Brown	✓	✓	✗	✓	✓	✓	✓	✓
"Khe Sanh"	Cold Chisel	✗	✗	✗	✗	✗	✗	✗	✓
"Yellow"	Coldplay	✓	✓	✓	✓	✓	✓	✓	✓
"Just Like Heaven"	The Cure	✗	✓	✗	✓	✗	✗	✗	✗
"¿Quién Me Iba a Decir?"	David Bisbal	✗	✗	✓	✗	✗	✗	✗	✗
"Lebt denn der alte Holzmichl noch...?"	De Randfichten	✗	✗	✗	✗	✓	✗	✗	✗
"Personal Jesus"	Depeche Mode	✓	✓	✓	✓	✓	✓	✓	✓
"Cada Dos Minutos"	Despistaos	✗	✗	✓	✗	✗	✗	✗	✗
"Survivor"	Destiny's Child	✓	✓	✗	✓	✗	✓	✗	✓
"White Flag"	Dido	✓	✓	✓	✓	✓	✓	✓	✓
"Ein Stern (…der deinen Namen trägt)"	DJ Ötzi (feat. Nik P.)	✗	✗	✗	✗	✓	✗	✗	✗
"Mercy"	Duffy	✓	✓	✓	✓	✓	✓	✓	✓
"En Algun Lugar"	Duncan Dhu	✗	✗	✓	✗	✗	✗	✗	✗
"Hungry Like the Wolf"	Duran Duran	✓	✓	✗	✓	✗	✓	✓	✗
"Let's Groove"	Earth, Wind & Fire	✓ (DLC)	✓ (DLC)	✓	✓	✓ (DLC)	✓	✓	✓ (DLC)
"An End Has a Start"	Editors	✗	✓	✗	✗	✗	✗	✗	✗
"Demasiado Tarde"	El Sueño de Morfeo	✗	✗	✓	✗	✗	✗	✗	✗
"No Te Pido Flores"	Fanny Lú	✗	✗	✓	✗	✗	✗	✗	✗
"Emanuela"	Fettes Brot	✗	✗	✗	✗	✓	✗	✗	✗
"Adrenalina"	Finley	✗	✗	✗	✗	✗	✓	✗	✗
"Lemon Tree"	Fools Garden	✗	✗	✗	✗	✓	✗	✗	✗
"Over My Head (Cable Car)"	The Fray	✓	✓ (DLC)	✓ (DLC)	✓ (DLC)	✓ (DLC)	✓ (DLC)	✓ (DLC)	✓ (DLC)
"It's Raining Men"	Geri Halliwell	✗	✓	✗	✗	✗	✗	✗	✗
"Colpo Di Fulmine"	Giò Di Tonno e Lola Ponce	✗	✗	✗	✗	✗	✓	✗	✗
"Che Che Colé"	Héctor Lavoe	✗	✗	✓	✗	✗	✗	✗	✗
"Hate to Say I Told You So"	The Hives	✗	✗	✗	✗	✗	✗	✓	✗
"ABC"	The Jackson 5	✓	✓	✓	✓	✓	✓	✓	✓
"Virtual Insanity"	Jamiroquai	✓ (DLC)	✓	✓ (DLC)	✓	✓ (DLC)	✓ (DLC)	✓ (DLC)	✓ (DLC)
"Olé"	Jarabe de Palo	✗	✗	✓	✗	✗	✗	✗	✗
"Take Me Home, Country Roads"	John Denver	✓	✓ (DLC)	✓ (DLC)	✓ (DLC)	✓ (DLC)	✓ (DLC)	✓ (DLC)	✓ (DLC)
"You're the Voice"	John Farnham	✗	✗	✗	✗	✗	✗	✗	✓
"Ring of Fire"	Johnny Cash	✓	✓	✓	✓	✓	✓	✓	✓
"Serenata Rap"	Jovanotti	✗	✗	✗	✗	✗	✓	✗	✗
"Can I Get Get Get"	Junior Senior	✓ (DLC)	✓ (DLC)	✓ (DLC)	✓ (DLC)	✓ (DLC)	✓ (DLC)	✓	✓ (DLC)
"Ruby"	Kaiser Chiefs	✗	✓	✗	✓	✓	✗	✓	✓
"Naïve"	The Kooks	✗	✓	✗	✗	✗	✗	✗	✗
"Suddenly I See"	KT Tunstall	✓ (DLC)	✓	✓ (DLC)	✓ (DLC)	✓ (DLC)	✓ (DLC)	✓ (DLC)	✓ (DLC)
"Love at First Sight"	Kylie Minogue	✗	✓	✓	✓	✓	✓	✓	✓
"Perdóname"	La Factoría	✗	✗	✓	✗	✗	✗	✗	✗
"Bleeding Love"	Leona Lewis	✓	✓	✓	✓	✓	✓	✓	✓
"Lip Gloss"	Lil Mama	✓	✗	✗	✗	✗	✗	✗	✗
"Himlen Runt Hörnet"	Lisa Nilsson	✗	✗	✗	✗	✗	✗	✓	✗
"Un Hombre Busca Una Mujer"	Luis Miguel	✗	✗	✓	✗	✗	✗	✗	✗
"Superstar"	Lupe Fiasco (feat. Matthew Santos)	✓	✓	✗	✓	✗	✗	✗	✗
"Makes Me Wonder"	Maroon 5	✓	✓	✓	✓	✓	✓	✓	✓
"Be Good Johnny"	Men at Work	✓ (DLC)	✓ (DLC)	✓ (DLC)	✓ (DLC)	✓ (DLC)	✓ (DLC)	✓ (DLC)	✓
"Special"	Mew	✗	✗	✗	✗	✗	✗	✓	✗
"Scar"	Missy Higgins	✗	✗	✗	✗	✗	✗	✗	✓
"You're My Heart, You're My Soul"	Modern Talking	✗	✗	✗	✗	✓	✗	✗	✗
"Rome Wasn't Built in a Day"	Morcheeba	✗	✓	✓	✓	✓	✓	✓	✓
"Lascia Che Io Sia..."	Nek	✗	✗	✗	✗	✗	✓	✗	✗
"99 Luftballons"	Nena	✗	✗	✗	✗	✓	✗	✗	✗
"In Bloom"	Nirvana	✓	✓	✓	✓	✓	✓	✓	✓
"Magic"	Olivia Newton-John	✓ (DLC)	✓ (DLC)	✓ (DLC)	✓ (DLC)	✓ (DLC)	✓ (DLC)	✓ (DLC)	✓
"Augen Auf!"	Oomph!	✗	✗	✗	✗	✓	✗	✗	✗
"Viva El Amor!"	Paola e Chiara	✗	✗	✗	✗	✗	✓	✗	✗
"Young Folks"	Peter Bjorn and John	✓	✓	✓	✓	✓	✓	✓	✓
"Major Tom (Völlig losgelöst)"	Peter Schilling	✓ (DLC)	✗	✗	✗	✓	✗	✗	✗
"Olvidame Y Pega La Vuelta"	Pimpinela	✗	✗	✓	✗	✗	✗	✗	✗
"Wenn jetzt Sommer wär"	Pohlmann	✗	✗	✗	✗	✓	✗	✗	✗
"Every Little Thing She Does Is Magic"	The Police	✓	✓	✗	✓	✗	✓	✓	✓
"I'm Gonna Be (500 Miles)"	The Proclaimers	✗	✓	✗	✗	✗	✗	✗	✗
"Another One Bites the Dust"	Queen	✓	✓	✓	✓	✓	✓	✓	✓
"The One I Love"	R.E.M.	✓	✗	✗	✗	✗	✗	✗	✗
"Fake Plastic Trees"	Radiohead	✓	✓	✓	✓	✓	✓	✓	✓
"I Wanna Be Sedated"	The Ramones	✓	✓	✗	✓	✓	✓	✓	✓
"Stand"	Rascal Flatts	✓	✗	✗	✗	✗	✗	✗	✗
"Love in a Trashcan"	The Raveonettes	✓	✓	✗	✓	✗	✓	✓	✗
"Supergirl"	Reamonn	✗	✗	✗	✗	✓	✗	✗	✗
"Umbrella"	Rihanna	✓	✓	✓	✓	✓	✓	✓	✓
"Frauen regier'n die Welt"	Roger Cicero	✗	✗	✗	✗	✓	✗	✗	✗
"Santa Maria"	Roland Kaiser	✗	✗	✗	✗	✓	✗	✗	✗
"Listen to Your Heart"	Roxette	✓	✓	✓	✓	✓	✓	✓	✓
"Love Song"	Sara Bareilles	✓	✗	✓	✓	✗	✓	✗	✓
"Amazing"	Seal	✗	✓	✗	✓	✓	✓	✓	✓
"Bidi Bidi Bom Bom"	Selena	✗	✗	✓	✗	✗	✗	✗	✗
"Shine"	Shannon Noll	✗	✗	✗	✗	✗	✗	✗	✓
"Soak Up the Sun"	Sheryl Crow	✓	✗	✗	✓	✗	✓	✗	✓
"Straight Lines"	Silverchair	✗	✗	✗	✗	✗	✗	✗	✓
"A Puro Dolor"	Son By Four	✗	✗	✓	✗	✗	✗	✗	✗
"Liberi Da Sempre"	Sonohra	✗	✗	✗	✗	✗	✓	✗	✗
"Put 'Em High"	StoneBridge	✗	✓	✗	✗	✗	✗	✗	✗
"Nuova Ossessione"	Subsonica	✗	✗	✗	✗	✗	✓	✗	✗
"I'm Only Me When I'm with You"	Taylor Swift	✓	✗	✗	✗	✗	✗	✗	✗
"Ladies Love Country Boys"	Trace Adkins	✓	✗	✗	✗	✗	✗	✗	✗
"Eg Vil Ha Deg"	Valkyrien Allstars	✗	✗	✗	✗	✗	✗	✓	✗
"Island in the Sun"	Weezer	✓	✗	✗	✓	✗	✗	✗	✓
"Dieser Weg"	Xavier Naidoo	✗	✗	✗	✗	✓	✗	✗	✗
"Bust a Move"	Young MC	✓	✓	✓ (DLC)	✓	✓ (DLC)	✓ (DLC)	✓	✓
"Erinner Mich Dich Zu Vergessen"	Yvonne Catterfeld	✗	✗	✗	✗	✓	✗	✗	✗

=== On-disc songs in Lips: Number One Hits ===
The following is a list of all 40 songs for the Lips sequel, Number One Hits. As with the first Lips game, all songs are master tracks. In addition to this, players are able to download a free five-pack of DLC; the contents of this pack are still not revealed to the public, although iNiS has stated that players can customize their DLC pack from a list of songs in the soon to be launched Xbox LIVE Music Channel.

Song Title	Artist
"Viva la Vida"	Coldplay
"Don't Matter"	Akon
"The Tide is High (Get the Feeling)"	Atomic Kitten
"Loser"	Beck
"Don't Phunk With My Heart"	The Black Eyed Peas
"Heart of Glass"	Blondie
"Big Girls Don't Cry"	Fergie
"Broken Strings"	James Morrison feat. Nelly Furtado
"She Drives Me Crazy"	Fine Young Cannibals
"Around The Way Girl"	LL Cool J
"How You Remind Me"	Nickelback
"Love Generation"	Bob Sinclar
"Don't Worry Be Happy"	Bobby McFerrin
"Bubbly"	Colbie Caillat
"(I Just) Died In Your Arms"	Cutting Crew
"Disturbia"	Rihanna
"U Can't Touch This"	MC Hammer
"More Than Words"	Extreme
"Apologize"	OneRepublic feat. Timbaland
"Karma Chameleon"	Culture Club
"I Heard It Through the Grapevine"	Marvin Gaye
"Oh, Pretty Woman"	Roy Orbison
"Ready, Set, Go!"	Tokio Hotel
"The Look"	Roxette
"Millennium"	Robbie Williams
"California Love"	2Pac feat. Dr. Dre and Roger Troutman
"Barbie Girl"	Aqua
"Just Dance"	Lady Gaga feat. Colby O'Donis
"Everybody Wants to Rule the World"	Tears for Fears
"The Fear"	Lily Allen
"Hey Baby"	DJ Ötzi
"I Don't Feel Like Dancin'"	Scissor Sisters
"Heartless"	Kanye West
"Touch My Body"	Mariah Carey
"Hey There Delilah"	The Plain White T's
"Always On My Mind"	Pet Shop Boys
"I'm Yours"	Jason Mraz
"I Get Around"	The Beach Boys
"Lovefool"	The Cardigans
"Push the Button"	Sugababes

=== On-disc songs in Lips: Party Classics ===
Song title	Artist	Year
"Rehab"	Amy Winehouse	2006
"I Think We're Alone Now"	Tiffany	1987
"True Faith"	New Order	1987
"Black Velvet"	Alannah Myles	1989
"Laid"	James	1993
"Friday I'm in Love"	The Cure	1992
"Word Up"	Cameo	1986
"What's Up"	4 Non Blondes	1993
"Rock and Roll All Nite"	Kiss	1975
"Red Red Wine"	UB40	1983
"I Want to Know What Love Is"	Foreigner	1984
"She Will Be Loved"	Maroon 5	2004
"To Be with You"	Mr. Big	1991
"Addicted To Love"	Robert Palmer	1986
"Every Rose Has Its Thorn"	Poison	1988
"Kiss Me"	Sixpence None the Richer	1998
"When A Man Loves A Woman"	Percy Sledge	1966
"Is This Love"	Whitesnake	1987
"You're Beautiful"	James Blunt	2005
"Y.M.C.A."	Village People	1978
"I'm Too Sexy"	Right Said Fred	1991
"Wannabe"	Spice Girls	1996
"Shiny Happy People"	R.E.M.	1991
"Live Is Life"	Opus	1985
"I Touch Myself"	Divinyls	1990
"Tubthumping"	Chumbawamba	1997
"Love Shack"	The B-52's	1989
"Doctor Jones"	Aqua	1997
"Son of a Preacher Man"	Dusty Springfield	1969
"These Boots Are Made for Walkin'"	Nancy Sinatra	1966
"Unchained Melody"	The Righteous Brothers	1965
"Brass in Pocket"	Pretenders	1979
"Sweet Home Alabama"	Lynyrd Skynyrd	1974
"My Sharona"	The Knack	1979
"American Pie"	Don McLean	1971
"It's Not Unusual"	Tom Jones	1965
"I Will Survive"	Gloria Gaynor	1978
"Groove Is in the Heart"	Deee-Lite	1990
"Rhythm of the Night"	DeBarge	1985
"Let's Get It Started"	The Black Eyed Peas	2004

=== On-disc songs in Lips: I Love the 80's ===
As the title suggests, all 40 songs on Lips: I Love the 80's game are from the 1980s.

Song title	Artist
"The Look of Love"	ABC
"Forever Young"	Alphaville
"Cruel Summer"	Bananarama
"Dreaming"	Blondie
"You're the Inspiration"	Chicago
"Do You Really Want to Hurt Me"	Culture Club
"Let's Dance"	David Bowie
"Whip It"	Devo
"Come On Eileen"	Dexys Midnight Runners
"Rio"	Duran Duran
"A Little Respect"	Erasure
"A Good Heart"	Feargal Sharkey
"Relax"	Frankie Goes to Hollywood
"The Power of Love"	Huey Lewis & the News
"Don't You Want Me"	The Human League
"Centerfold"	J. Geils Band
"Bad Reputation"	Joan Jett and The Blackhearts
"Too Shy"	Kajagoogoo
"Walking on Sunshine"	Katrina and the Waves
"Bette Davis Eyes"	Kim Carnes
"Kids in America"	Kim Wilde
"Celebration"	Kool & the Gang
"Our House"	Madness
"Blue Monday '88"	New Order
"The Riddle"	Nik Kershaw
"Love is a Battlefield"	Pat Benatar
"Super Freak"	Rick James
"Alive and Kicking"	Simple Minds
"Tainted Love"	Soft Cell
"Gold"	Spandau Ballet
"Shout"	Tears for Fears
"Mirror in the Bathroom"	The Beat
"Video Killed the Radio Star"	The Buggles
"Don't Leave Me This Way"	The Communards
"Boys Don't Cry"	The Cure
"Roxanne"	The Police
"Don't Get Me Wrong"	The Pretenders
"Mickey"	Toni Basil
"Vienna"	Ultravox
"Don't Go"	Yazoo

=== On-disc songs in Lips: Canta en Español ===
The following is a list of all 42 (35 on-disc and 7 DLC) songs available for the Lips spin-off, Lips: Canta en Español. As with the first Lips game and Lips: Number One Hits, all songs are master tracks.

Song title	Artist
"¿Porqué Te Vas?"	Jeanette
"20 De Abril"	Celtas Cortos
"Amores De Barra"	Ella Baila Sola
"Antes Que Ver El Sol"	Coti
"Bailar pegados"	Sergio Dalma
"Caminando Por La Vida"	Melendi
"Colgando en tus manos"	Carlos Baute con Marta Sánchez
"Como La Vida"	Hanna
"Dame Cariño"	El Arrebato
"Déjame"	Los Secretos
"El Universo Sobre Mi"	Amaral
"Embrujada"	Tino Casal
"Entre Dos Tierras"	Héroes del Silencio
"Física O Química"	Despistaos
"La Flaca"	Jarabe de Palo
"Labios Compartidos"	Maná
"Lamento Boliviano"	Dani Mata
"Libre"	Nino Bravo
"Malo"	Bebe
"Me Gustas Tú"	Manu Chao
"Nada Que Perder"	Conchita
"Ni una Sola Palabra"	Paulina Rubio
"No Dudaría"	Rosario
"No Me Crees"	Efecto Mariposa y Javier Ojeda
"Noches De Bohemia"	Navajita Plateá
"Obsesión"	Aventura
"Por La Boca Vive El Pez"	Fito y los Fitipaldis
"Sabor De Amor"	Danza Invisible
"Sígueme"	Manuel Carrasco
"Sin Documentos"	Los Rodríguez
"Sin Ti No Soy Nada"	Amaral
"So Payaso"	Extremoduro
"Soldadito Marinero"	Fito y los Fitipaldis
"Tenía Tanto Que Darte"	Nena Daconte
"Un Violinista En Tu Tejado"	Melendi

=== On-disc songs in Lips: Deutsche Partyknaller ===
The following is a list of 40 songs in Lips: Deutsche Partyknaller.

Song title	Artist
"Besser Geht's Nicht"	2raumwohnung
"Ein Engel Kein König"	Auletta
"Gib mir noch Zeit"	Blümchen
"Heyo Captain Jack"	Captain Jack
"Love Songs (They Kill Me)"	Cinema Bizarre
"Ey DJ"	Culcha Candela
"Hamma!"	Culcha Candela
"Viva Colonia"	Die Höhner
"Millionär"	Die Prinzen
"Sierra Madre"	Die Zillertaler Schürzenjäger
"Eisblumen"	Eisblume
"Nach dem Goldrausch"	Fotos
"Käsebrot"	Helge Schneider
"So soll es bleiben"	Ich & Ich
"Stark"	Ich & Ich
"Klar"	Jan Delay
"Himalaya"	Jennifer Rostock
"Dieses Leben"	Juli
"Perfekte Welle"	Juli
"Kling Klang"	Keimzeit
"Zwei Herzen"	Klee
"Verdammt, ich lieb' dich"	Matthias Reim
"Shame"	Monrose
"Allein Allein"	Polarkreis 18
"The Colour of Snow"	Polarkreis 18
"Through the Eyes of a Child"	Reamonn
"Gib Mir Sonne"	Rosenstolz
"Ich Bin Ich (Wir Sind Wir)"	Rosenstolz
"Ich kenne nichts (I've Never Seen)"	RZA feat. Xavier Naidoo
"Bis die Sonne Rauskommt"	Samy Deluxe
"Maria Magdalena"	Sandra
"Wind of Change"	Scorpions
"Und wenn ein Lied"	Söhne Mannheims feat. Xavier Naidoo
"'54, '74, '90, 2010"	Sportfreunde Stiller
"Fliegerlied (So Ein Schöner Tag)"	Tim Toupet
"Durch den Monsun"	Tokio Hotel
"Sex Bomb"	Tom Jones feat. Mousse T
"Da, da, da"	Trio
"Ein Ganzer Sommer"	Virginia Jetzt!
"Gekommen, um zu bleiben"	Wir sind Helden

== Downloadable songs ==
The following songs are available for download for both Lips titles from the Xbox Live Marketplace. Most songs, unless otherwise noted, are available in all Xbox Live enabled locales. Some of the downloadable songs are already available on-disc in some locales. Most songs are available for 160 MSP with some priced at 180 MSP. In some instances, DLC does not include music videos due to the time the original songs were released. Lastly, genres are shown in the table below as they are listed on the Get Music section.

Since the release of Lips: Deutsche Partyknaller, downloadable German songs have been made available for purchase across the Lips platform, the player does not need to buy Deutsche Partyknaller to download this DLC; however, these songs are restricted to certain locales (Germany, Austria, Switzerland and Belgium). Likewise, after the release of Lips: Canta en Español, new Spanish songs will be available for purchase in Mexico and Spain.

=== Main series singles ===
Song Title	Artist	Genre	Music Video	Release date
"The Sign"	Ace of Base	Pop	✓	November 21, 2008
"Take On Me"	a-ha	Pop	✓	November 21, 2008
"Bust a Move"	Young MC	Hip Hop/Rap	✓	November 21, 2008
"Chasing Pavements"	Adele	Pop	✓	November 21, 2008
"Violet Hill"	Coldplay	Alternative	✓	November 21, 2008
"No Substitute Love"	Estelle	R&B/Soul	✓	November 21, 2008
"The Remedy (I Won't Worry)"	Jason Mraz	Alternative	✓	November 21, 2008
"All Star"	Smash Mouth	Rock	✓	November 28, 2008
"Give a Little Bit"	Supertramp	Rock	✗	November 28, 2008
"A Thousand Miles"	Vanessa Carlton	Rock	✓	November 28, 2008
"Blue Christmas"	Elvis Presley	Holiday	✗	December 5, 2008
"Hannukah Blessings"	The Barenaked Ladies	Holiday	✗	December 5, 2008
"The Dreidel Song"	Sister Hazel	Holiday	✗	December 5, 2008
"It's the Most Wonderful Time of the Year"	Andy Williams	Holiday	✗	December 5, 2008
"Rudolph the Red-Nosed Reindeer	Gene Autry	Holiday	✗	December 12, 2008
"Rockin' Around the Christmas Tree"	Brenda Lee	Holiday	✗	December 12, 2008
"A Holly Jolly Christmas"	Burl Ives	Holiday	✗	December 12, 2008
"The Christmas Song (Merry Christmas To You)"	Nat King Cole	Holiday	✗	December 12, 2008
"Santa Baby"	Kylie Minogue	Holiday	✗	December 12, 2008
"White Christmas"	Bing Crosby	Holiday	✗	December 12, 2008
"Over My Head (Cable Car)"	The Fray	Rock	✓	December 19, 2008
"Every Little Step"	Bobby Brown	R&B/Soul	✓	December 19, 2008
"Prisoner of Society"	The Living End	Rock	✓	December 19, 2008
"Virtual Insanity"	Jamiroquai	Pop	✓	December 19, 2008
"What's Love Got to Do with It"	Tina Turner	Rock	✓	December 26, 2008
"New Shoes"	Paolo Nutini	Rock	✓	December 26, 2008
"What Is Love"	Haddaway	Pop	✓	December 26, 2008
"Somethin' Stupid"	Robbie Williams and Nicole Kidman	Pop	✓	January 2, 2009
"Where Did Our Love Go"	The Supremes	R&B/Soul	✗	January 2, 2009
"Be Good Johnny"	Men at Work	Rock	✓	January 2, 2009
"Let's Groove"	Earth, Wind and Fire	Pop	✓	January 2, 2009
"Superstar"	Jamelia	R&B/Soul	✓	January 9, 2009
"People Are People"	Depeche Mode	Alternative	✓	January 9, 2009
"Suddenly I See"	KT Tunstall	Pop	✓	January 9, 2009
"You've Lost That Lovin' Feelin'"	The Righteous Brothers	Rock	✗	January 16, 2009
"Erase/Rewind"	The Cardigans	Rock	✓	January 16, 2009
"When I Grow Up"	Pussycat Dolls	Pop	✓	January 16, 2009
"Thnks fr th Mmrs"	Fall Out Boy	Alternative	✓	January 23, 2009
"Look What You've Done"	Jet	Rock	✓	January 23, 2009
"Hate That I Love You"	Rihanna feat. Ne-Yo	Pop	✓	January 23, 2009
"Sunday Morning"	Maroon 5	Rock	✓	January 30, 2009
"Take a Bow"	Rihanna	Pop	✓	January 30, 2009
"Water Runs Dry"	Boyz II Men	R&B/Soul	✓	January 30, 2009
"In My Place"	Coldplay	Alternative	✓	February 6, 2009
"Fallin'"	Alicia Keys	R&B/Soul	✓	February 6, 2009
"Building a Mystery"	Sarah McLachlan	Rock	✓	February 6, 2009
"Buttons"	Pussycat Dolls feat. Snoop Dogg	Pop	✓	February 13, 2009
"Magic"	Olivia Newton-John	Pop	✓	February 13, 2009
"My Happy Ending"	Avril Lavigne	Pop	✓	February 13, 2009
"How to Save a Life"	The Fray	Rock	✓	February 20, 2009
"Swing Life Away"	Rise Against	Rock	✓	February 20, 2009
"Speed Up"	Funkerman	Dance	✓	February 20, 2009
"In the Shadows"	The Rasmus	Rock	✓	February 27, 2009
"The Adventure"	Angels and Airwaves	Alternative	✓	February 27, 2009
"Amber"	311	Pop	✓	February 27, 2009
"Shake It"	Metro Station	Alternative	✓	March 6, 2009
"Hook Me Up"	The Veronicas	Pop	✓	March 6, 2009
"Lips of an Angel"	Hinder	Rock	✓	March 6, 2009
"The Scientist"	Coldplay	Alternative	✓	March 13, 2009
"Speed of Sound"	Coldplay	Alternative	✓	March 13, 2009
"The Great Escape"	Boys Like Girls	Rock	✓	March 13, 2009
"Down on the Corner"	Creedence Clearwater Revival	Rock	✗	March 20, 2009
"Won't Go Home Without You"	Maroon 5	Pop	✓	March 20, 2009
"Reunited"	Peaches & Herb	R&B/Soul	✗	March 20, 2009
"Who'll Stop the Rain"	Creedence Clearwater Revival	Rock	✗	March 27, 2009
"I'll Make Love to You"	Boyz II Men	R&B/Soul	✓	March 27, 2009
"Bound for the Floor"	Local H	Rock	✓	March 27, 2009
"Sugar We're Goin Down"	Fall Out Boy	Alternative	✓	April 3, 2009
"Bad Moon Rising"	Creedence Clearwater Revival	Rock	✗	April 3, 2009
"Wish You Were Here"	Incubus	Alternative	✓	April 3, 2009
"Lookin' Out My Back Door"	Creedence Clearwater Revival	Rock	✗	April 10, 2009
"Closer"	Ne-Yo	R&B/Soul	✓	April 10, 2009
"So Sick"	Ne-Yo	R&B/Soul	✓	April 10, 2009
"Kryptonite"	3 Doors Down	Rock	✓	April 17, 2009
"All My Life"	K-Ci & JoJo	R&B/Soul	✓	April 17, 2009
"Sing"	Travis	Rock	✓	April 17, 2009
"Love Today"	Mika	Pop	✓	April 24, 2009
"Ocean Avenue"	Yellowcard	Alternative	✓	April 24, 2009
"Linger"	The Cranberries	Alternative	✓	April 24, 2009
"Dance Floor Anthem (I Don't Want to Be in Love)"	Good Charlotte	Alternative	✓	May 1, 2009
"Why Does It Always Rain on Me?"	Travis	Rock	✓	May 1, 2009
"Hard to Handle"	The Black Crowes	Rock	✓	May 1, 2009
"You Get What You Give"	The New Radicals	Pop	✓	May 8, 2009
"Turning Japanese"	The Vapors	Rock	✓	May 8, 2009
"Clocks"	Coldplay	Alternative	✓	May 8, 2009
"Take Me Home, Country Roads"	John Denver	Country	✗	May 15, 2009
"Mr. Telephone Man"	New Edition	R&B/Soul	✓	May 15, 2009
"Cool It Now"	New Edition	R&B/Soul	✓	May 15, 2009
"If It Isn't Love"	New Edition	R&B/Soul	✓	May 15, 2009
"Lollipop"	Mika	Pop	✓	May 22, 2009
"Achy Breaky Heart"	Billy Ray Cyrus	Country	✓	May 22, 2009
"100 Years"	Five For Fighting	Rock	✓	May 22, 2009
"I Miss You"	Blink-182	Alternative	✓	May 29, 2009
"Life is a Rollercoaster"	Ronan Keating	Pop	✓	May 29, 2009
"Chasing Cars"	Snow Patrol	Alternative	✓	May 29, 2009
"I Alone"	Live	Alternative	✓	June 5, 2009
"Somewhere Only We Know"	Keane	Rock	✓	June 5, 2009
"Joey"	Concrete Blonde	Alternative	✓	June 5, 2009
"Shake the World"	ForeverGirl	Dance	✓	June 11, 2009
"Love You Anyway"	Boyzone	Pop	✓	June 12, 2009
"Freak Like Me"	Sugababes	Pop	✓	June 12, 2009
"Spiralling"	Keane	Rock	✓	June 19, 2009
"Take Back the City"	Snow Patrol	Alternative	✓	June 19, 2009
"Radar Love"	Golden Earring	Rock	✓	June 19, 2009
"Love Like This"	Natasha Bedingfield feat. Sean Kingston	Pop	✓	June 26, 2009
"Ice Ice Baby"	Vanilla Ice	Hip Hop/Rap	✓	June 26, 2009
"I Want You to Want Me (Live at Budokan)"	Cheap Trick	Rock	✓	June 26, 2009
"Shut Up"	The Black Eyed Peas	Hip Hop/Rap	✓	July 3, 2009
"Baby Got Back"	Sir Mix-a-Lot	Hip Hop/Rap	✓	July 3, 2009
"The Next Movement"	The Roots	Hip Hop/Rap	✓	July 3, 2009
"Get the Party Started"	P!nk	Pop	✓	July 10, 2009
"Don't Let Me Get Me"	P!nk	Pop	✓	July 10, 2009
"So What"	P!nk	Pop	✓	July 10, 2009
"Just So You Know"	Jesse McCartney	Pop	✓	July 17, 2009
"Hey Mama"	The Black Eyed Peas	Hip Hop/Rap	✓	July 17, 2009
"Can I Get Get Get"	Junior Senior	Pop	✓	July 17, 2009
"Upside Down"	Diana Ross	Soul	✓	July 24, 2009
"Right Here Waiting"	Richard Marx	Pop	✓	July 24, 2009
"Let's Stay Together"	Al Green	Soul	✗	July 24, 2009
"I'm Coming Out"	Diana Ross	Soul	✗	July 31, 2009
"It's Not the Fall That Hurts"	Caesars	Rock	✓	July 31, 2009
"Yo (Excuse Me Miss)"	Chris Brown	Hip Hop/Rap	✓	July 31, 2009
"Song for Whoever"	The Beautiful South	Alternative	✓	August 7, 2009
"The Future's So Bright, I Gotta Wear Shades"	Timbuk3	Rock	✓	August 7, 2009
"Love Is Gone"	David Guetta	Pop	✓	August 14, 2009
"With Every Heartbeat"	Robyn	Pop	✓	August 14, 2009
"The Road to Mandalay"	Robbie Williams	Pop	✓	August 21, 2009
"Talk"	Coldplay	Alternative	✓	August 21, 2009
"Angel"	Shaggy feat. Rayvon	R&B/Soul	✓	August 28, 2009
"Proud Mary"	Creedence Clearwater Revival	Rock	✗	August 28, 2009
"Shut Up and Drive"	Rihanna	Pop	✓	September 4, 2009
"We Will Become Silhouettes"	The Postal Service	Alternative	✓	September 4, 2009
"Such Great Heights"	The Postal Service	Alternative	✓	September 11, 2009
"Everything About You"	Ugly Kid Joe	Rock	✓	September 11, 2009
"Sometime Around Midnight"	The Airborne Toxic Event	Rock	✓	September 18, 2009
"Nine in the Afternoon"	Panic! At The Disco	Alternative	✓	September 18, 2009
"An Honest Mistake"	The Bravery	Alternative	✓	September 25, 2009
"You Ain't Seen Nothing Yet"	Bachman-Turner Overdrive	Rock	✓	September 25, 2009
"My Lovin' (You're Never Gonna Get It)"	En Vogue	R&B/Soul	✓	October 2, 2009
"Breakfast At Tiffany's"	Deep Blue Something	Alternative	✓	October 2, 2009
"Barely Breathing"	Duncan Sheik	Alternative	✓	October 9, 2009
"Always"	Erasure	Pop	✓	October 9, 2009
"Chains of Love"	Erasure	Pop	✓	October 16, 2009
"Return of the Mack"	Mark Morrison	R&B/Soul	✓	October 16, 2009
"Lucky"	Jason Mraz feat. Colbie Caillat	Pop	✓	October 16, 2009
"Baby Love"	The Supremes	R&B/Soul	✗	October 23, 2009
"Stop! In the Name of Love"	The Supremes	R&B/Soul	✗	October 23, 2009
"You Can't Hurry Love"	The Supremes	R&B/Soul	✗	October 23, 2009
"I'll Stand by You"	The Pretenders	Rock	✓	October 30, 2009
"Nothing's Gonna Change My Love for You"	Glenn Medeiros	Pop	✓	October 30, 2009
"Hold On"	En Vogue	R&B/Soul	✓	October 30, 2009
"You Keep Me Hangin' On"	The Supremes	R&B/Soul	✗	November 6, 2009
"Angel of the Morning"	Juice Newton	Pop	✓	November 6, 2009
"Shy Boy"	Bananarama	Pop	✓	November 6, 2009
"Let's Get It On"	Marvin Gaye	R&B/Soul	✓	November 13, 2009
"How Sweet It Is to Be Loved by You"	Marvin Gaye	R&B/Soul	✓	November 13, 2009
"What's Going On"	Marvin Gaye	R&B/Soul	✓	November 13, 2009
"Fallin' for You"	Colbie Caillat	Pop	✓	November 20, 2009
"Realize"	Colbie Caillat	Pop	✓	November 20, 2009
"The Little Things"	Colbie Caillat	Pop	✓	November 20, 2009
"Eh, Eh (Nothing Else I Can Say)"	Lady Gaga	Pop	✓	November 27, 2009
"LoveGame"	Lady Gaga	Pop	✓	November 27, 2009
"Poker Face"	Lady Gaga	Pop	✓	November 27, 2009
"My Girl"	The Temptations	R&B/Soul	✗	December 4, 2009
"Papa Was a Rollin' Stone"	The Temptations	R&B/Soul	✗	December 4, 2009
"Ain't Too Proud to Beg"	The Temptations	R&B/Soul	✗	December 4, 2009
"Baby, It's Cold Outside"	Margaret Whiting & Johnny Mercer	Holiday	✗	December 4, 2009
"Alone"	Heart	Rock	✓	December 11, 2009
"I Don't Want to Wait"	Paula Cole	Pop	✗	December 11, 2009
"Istanbul (Not Constantinople)"	They Might Be Giants	Rock	✓	December 11, 2009
"Silver Bells"	Dean Martin	Holiday	✗	December 16, 2009
"Forever Your Girl"	Paula Abdul	Pop	✓	December 18, 2009
"Opposites Attract"	Paula Abdul	Pop	✓	December 18, 2009
"Rush Rush"	Paula Abdul	Pop	✓	December 18, 2009
"Silent Night"	Dean Martin	Holiday	✗	December 18, 2009
"I'll Be Home for Christmas"	Dean Martin	Holiday	✗	December 18, 2009
"Right Round"	Flo Rida	Hip-Hop/Rap	✓	December 25, 2009
"Think"	Aretha Franklin	R&B/Soul	✗	December 25, 2009
"Blister in the Sun"	Violent Femmes	Alternative	✗	December 25, 2009
"I Second That Emotion"	Smokey Robinson & The Miracles	R&B/Soul	✗	January 1, 2010
"Love Machine (Part 1)"	The Miracles	R&B/Soul	✗	January 1, 2010
"The Tracks of My Tears"	Smokey Robinson & The Miracles	R&B/Soul	✗	January 1, 2010
"Lean on Me"	Club Nouveau	R&B/Soul	✓	January 8, 2010
"Baby When the Light"	David Guetta feat. Cozi	Pop	✓	January 8, 2010
"Homecoming"	Kanye West feat. Chris Martin	Hip-Hop/Rap	✓	January 8, 2010
"Mustang Sally"	Wilson Pickett	R&B/Soul	✗	January 15, 2010
"Soul Meets Body"	Death Cab for Cutie	Alternative	✓	January 15, 2010
"Ring My Bell"	Anita Ward	Pop	✗	January 15, 2010
"Little Lies"	Fleetwood Mac	Pop	✗	January 22, 2010
"Tripping"	Robbie Williams	Pop	✓	January 22, 2010
"Ordinary Day"	Vanessa Carlton	Rock	✓	January 22, 2010
"Carnival"	The Cardigans	Rock	✓	January 29, 2010
"My Favourite Game"	The Cardigans	Rock	✓	January 29, 2010
"Gypsy Woman (She's Homeless)"	Crystal Waters	Dance	✓	January 29, 2010
"Ain't No Mountain High Enough"	Marvin Gaye & Tammi Terrell	R&B/Soul	✓	February 5, 2010
"Ain't Nothing Like the Real Thing"	Marvin Gaye & Tammi Terrell	R&B/Soul	✓	February 5, 2010
"You're All I Need to Get By"	Marvin Gaye & Tammi Terrell	R&B/Soul	✓	February 5, 2010
"Cherish"	The Association	Pop	✗	February 12, 2010
"Love Stinks"	The J. Geils Band	Rock	✓	February 12, 2010
"Sex and Candy"	Marcy Playground	Alternative	✓	February 12, 2010
"High"	James Blunt	Rock	✓	February 19, 2010
"Paparazzi"	Lady Gaga	Pop	✓	February 19, 2010
"Spitting Games"	Snow Patrol	Alternative	✓	February 19, 2010
"Mr. Vain"	Culture Beat	Dance	✓	February 26, 2010
"Free Bird"	Lynyrd Skynyrd	Rock	✗	February 26, 2010
"Hip Hop Hooray"	Naughty By Nature	Hip-Hop/Rap	✓	February 26, 2010
"Brick House"	Commodores	R&B/Soul	✓	March 5, 2010
"Easy"	Commodores	R&B/Soul	✗	March 5, 2010
"Three Times a Lady"	Commodores	R&B/Soul	✗	March 5, 2010
"Breathless"	The Corrs	Pop	✓	March 12, 2010
"Happy Hour"	The Housemartins	Rock	✓	March 12, 2010
"Sugar Sugar"	The Archies	Pop	✗	March 19, 2010
"Do You Believe in Love"	Huey Lewis and The News	Rock	✓	March 19, 2010
"If You Don't Know Me by Now"	Simply Red	Pop	✓	March 19, 2010
"Come Away With Me"	Norah Jones	Pop	✓	March 26, 2010
"Don't Know Why"	Norah Jones	Pop	✓	March 26, 2010
"Sunrise"	Norah Jones	Pop	✓	March 26, 2010
"Ordinary World"	Duran Duran	Pop	✓	April 2, 2010
"Drive"	The Cars	Pop	✓	April 2, 2010
"Straight Up (song)"	Paula Abdul	Pop	✓	April 2, 2010
"Pop Muzik"	M	Pop	✓	April 2, 2010
"Baby I Need Your Loving"	Four Tops	R&B/Soul	✗	April 2, 2010
"I Can't Help Myself (Sugar Pie Honey Bunch)"	Four Tops	R&B/Soul	✗	April 2, 2010
"Reach Out I'll Be There"	Four Tops	R&B/Soul	✓	April 2, 2010
"Mad World"	Tears for Fears	New Wave	✓	April 9, 2010
"The Safety Dance"	Men Without Hats	New Wave	✓	April 9, 2010
"Breakaway"	Tracey Ullman	Pop	✓	April 9, 2010
"I Found Someone"	Cher	Pop	✓	April 9, 2010
"Bette Davis Eyes"	Kim Carnes	Pop	✓	April 9, 2010
"Superfreak"	Rick James	R&B/Soul	✓	April 9, 2010
"Video Killed the Radio Star"	The Buggles	Pop	✓	April 9, 2010
"Whip It"	Devo	Pop	✓	April 9, 2010
"Rapture"	Blondie	Pop	✓	April 16, 2010
"Obsession"	Animotion	New Wave	✓	April 16, 2010
"I Can Dream About You"	Dan Hartman	Rock	✗	April 16, 2010
"I Melt With You"	Modern English	New Wave	✓	April 16, 2010
"Mickey"	Toni Basil	Pop	✓	April 16, 2010
"Tainted Love"	Soft Cell	Pop	✓	April 16, 2010
"Centerfold"	The J. Geils Band	Rock	✓	April 16, 2010
"Celebration"	Kool & the Gang	R&B/Soul	✓	April 16, 2010
"Road to Nowhere"	Talking Heads	New Wave	✓	April 23, 2010
"She Works Hard for the Money"	Donna Summer	Pop	✓	April 23, 2010
"Strangelove"	Depeche Mode	New Wave	✓	April 23, 2010
"Major Tom (Coming Home)"	Peter Schilling	New Wave	✓	April 23, 2010
"Going Back to Cali"	LL Cool J	Hip Hop	✓	April 30, 2010
"Head over Heels"	The Go-Go's	New Wave	✓	April 30, 2010
"Our Lips Are Sealed"	The Go-Go's	New Wave	✓	April 30, 2010
"We Got the Beat"	The Go-Go's	New Wave	✗	April 30, 2010
"Rio"	Duran Duran	Pop	✓	April 23, 2010
"Walking on Sunshine"	Katrina and the Waves	Pop	✓	April 23, 2010
"Roxanne"	The Police	Rock	✓	April 23, 2010
"Do You Really Want to Hurt Me"	Culture Club	Pop	✓	April 23, 2010
"Don't You Want Me"	Human League	Pop	✓	April 30, 2010
"Come On Eileen"	Dexys Midnight Runners	Pop	✓	April 30, 2010
"Let's Dance"	David Bowie	Pop	✓	April 30, 2010
"Bad Reputation"	Joan Jett & the Blackhearts	Rock	✓	April 30, 2010
"Money (That's What I Want)"	Barrett Strong	R&B	✗	May 7, 2010
"Let It Whip"	Dazz Band	R&B/Funk	✗	May 7, 2010
"What Becomes of the Brokenhearted"	Jimmy Ruffin	Soul	✗	May 7, 2010
"7 Things"	Miley Cyrus	Pop	✓	May 7, 2010
"Fly on the Wall"	Miley Cyrus	Pop	✓	May 7, 2010
"See You Again"	Miley Cyrus	Pop	✗	May 7, 2010
"The Climb"	Miley Cyrus	Pop	✓	May 7, 2010
"Ain't Nobody (Remix)"	Rufus & Chaka Khan	Pop/Soul/R&B	✓	May 14, 2010
"The Gambler"	Kenny Rogers	Country	✓	May 14, 2010
"La La La"	LMFAO	Dance	✓	May 14, 2010
"Wouldn't It Be Good"	Nik Kershaw	Pop	✓	May 14, 2010
"Energy"	Keri Hilson	R&B	✓	May 21, 2010
"How's It Going to Be"	Third Eye Blind	Rock	✓	May 21, 2010
"I Can't Wait"	Nu Shooz	Pop	✓	May 21, 2010
"Ladies of the World"	Flight of the Conchords	Comedy	✓	May 28, 2010
"Crocodile Rock"	Elton John	Rock	✗	May 28, 2010
"Your Song"	Elton John	Pop	✓	May 28, 2010
"Don't Go Breaking My Heart"	Elton John feat. Kiki Dee	Pop	✓	May 28, 2010
"Misery Business"	Paramore	Rock	✓	May 28, 2010
"Shotgun"	Junior Walker & the All Stars	Soul	✗	June 4, 2010
"Dancing in the Street"	Martha and the Vandellas	Soul	✗	June 4, 2010
"My Guy"	Mary Wells	Soul	✗	June 4, 2010
"Fireflies"	Owl City	Pop	✓	June 4, 2010
"Stuck with You"	Huey Lewis and the News	Rock	✓	June 11, 2010
"Picture of You"	Boyzone	Pop	✗	June 11, 2010
"Some Guys Have All the Luck"	Rod Stewart	Pop	✓	June 11, 2010
"1, 2, 3, 4"	Plain White T's	Pop	✓	June 11, 2010
"I've Never Been to Me"	Charlene	Pop	✗	June 18, 2010
"Dirty Little Secret"	The All-American Rejects	Rock	✗	June 18, 2010
"Meet Me on the Equinox"	Death Cab for Cutie	Rock	✗	June 18, 2010
"Here Without You"	3 Doors Down	Rock	✓	June 25, 2010
"It's Not My Time"	3 Doors Down	Rock	✓	June 25, 2010
"When I'm Gone"	3 Doors Down	Rock	✓	June 25, 2010
"Lost!"	Coldplay	Rock	✓	June 25, 2010
"Do You Love Me"	The Contours	R&B/Soul	✗	July 2, 2010
"Please Mr. Postman"	The Marvelettes	R&B/Soul	✗	July 2, 2010
"The Way You Do the Things You Do"	The Temptations	R&B/Soul	✗	July 2, 2010
"Photograph"	Nickelback	Rock	✓	July 2, 2010
"Blue Jean"	David Bowie	Rock	✓	July 9, 2010
"Build Me Up Buttercup"	The Foundations	R&B/Soul	✗	July 9, 2010
"(Love Is Like a) Heat Wave"	Martha and the Vandellas	R&B/Soul	✗	July 9, 2010
"The Reason"	Hoobastank	Alternative	✓	July 9, 2010
"Get Down on It"	Kool & the Gang	R&B/Soul	✓	July 16, 2010
"Locomotion"	Orchestral Manoeuvres in the Dark	Pop	✓	July 16, 2010
"Back on the Chain Gang"	The Pretenders	Rock	✓	July 16, 2010
"One Week"	Barenaked Ladies	Alternative	✓	July 16, 2010
"If I Could Turn Back Time"	Cher	Rock	✓	July 23, 2010
"Respectable"	Mel and Kim	Pop	✓	July 23, 2010
"Kingston Town"	UB40	Reggae	✓	July 23, 2010
"If You're Not the One"	Daniel Bedingfield	Pop	✓	July 23, 2010
"Whatcha Say"	Jason Derülo	R&B/Soul	✓	July 30, 2010
"Fire and Ice"	Pat Benatar	Rock	✗	July 30, 2010
"Hit Me With Your Best Shot"	Pat Benatar	Rock	✗	July 30, 2010
"We Belong"	Pat Benatar	Rock	✓	July 30, 2010
"The Look of Love"	ABC	Pop	✓	August 6, 2010
"Hard to Say I'm Sorry"	Chicago	Rock	✓	August 6, 2010
"Replay"	Iyaz	R&B/Soul	✓	August 6, 2010
"All I Ask of You"	Cliff Richard & Sarah Brightman	Pop	✓	August 13, 2010
"Love Changes Everything"	Michael Ball	Pop	✓	August 13, 2010
"Memory"	Elaine Paige	Pop	✓	August 13, 2010
"Hold On"	Wilson Phillips	Pop	✓	August 20, 2010
"Kiss from a Rose"	Seal	R&B/Soul	✗	August 20, 2010
"The Heart of Rock & Roll"	Huey Lewis and the News	Rock	✗	August 27, 2010
"Hip to Be Square"	Huey Lewis and the News	Rock	✓	August 27, 2010
"If This Is It"	Huey Lewis and the News	Rock	✓	August 27, 2010
"Workin' for a Livin'"	Huey Lewis and the News	Rock	✓	August 27, 2010
"Bad Day"	Daniel Powter	Pop	✓	September 3, 2010
"Break Your Heart"	Taio Cruz feat. Ludacris	Pop	✓	September 3, 2010
"Donuts, Go Nuts! (from 'Splosion Man)"	Matt "Chainsaw" Chaney	Pop	✗	September 3, 2010
"Down"	Jay Sean feat. Lil Wayne	Pop	✓	September 3, 2010
"Any Dream Will Do"	Donny Osmond	Pop	✓	September 10, 2010
"Don't Cry for Me Argentina"	Elaine Paige	Pop	✓	September 10, 2010
"The Phantom of the Opera"	Sarah Brightman and Steve Harley	Pop	✓	September 10, 2010
"Looking for a New Love"	Jody Watley	Pop	✓	September 17, 2010
"Losing My Religion"	R.E.M.	Alternative	✗	September 17, 2010
"Everything"	Michael Bublé	Pop	✓	September 24, 2010
"Haven't Met You Yet"	Michael Bublé	Pop	✓	September 24, 2010
"Home"	Michael Bublé	Pop	✓	September 24, 2010
"I Will Possess Your Heart"	Death Cab For Cutie	Alternative	✓	September 24, 2010
"Shining Light"	Ash	Alternative	✓	October 1, 2010
"Airplanes"	B.o.B feat. Hayley Williams of Paramore	Hip-Hop/Rap	✓	October 1, 2010
"1973"	James Blunt	Pop	✓	October 1, 2010
"From Yesterday"	Thirty Seconds to Mars	Rock	✓	October 8, 2010
"Nasty"	Janet Jackson	R&B/Soul	✓	October 8, 2010
"Secrets"	OneRepublic	Rock	✓	October 8, 2010
"You Were Meant for Me"	Jewel	Pop	✓	October 15, 2010
"Smile"	Lily Allen	Pop	✓	October 15, 2010
"Eternity"	Robbie Williams	Pop	✓	October 15, 2010
"I Don't Wanna Live Without Your Love"	Chicago	Rock	✓	October 22, 2010
"Gotta Be Somebody"	Nickelback	Alternative	✓	October 22, 2010
"One Less Lonely Girl"	Justin Bieber	Pop	✓	October 29, 2010
"One Time"	Justin Bieber	Pop	✓	October 29, 2010
"Welcome to the Black Parade"	My Chemical Romance	Rock	✓	October 29, 2010
"In a Big Country"	Big Country	Rock	✓	November 5, 2010
"Things Can Only Get Better"	Howard Jones	Pop	✓	November 5, 2010
"In My Head"	Jason Derülo	R&B/Soul	✓	November 5, 2010
"Crush"	Jennifer Paige	Pop	✓	November 12, 2010
"Casanova"	LeVert	R&B/Soul	✓	November 12, 2010
"Step Into Christmas"	Elton John	Holiday	✓	November 19, 2010
"Thong Song"	Sisqó	R&B/Soul	✓	November 19, 2010
"Mull of Kintyre"	Wings	Pop	✓	November 19, 2010
"Hard Habit to Break"	Chicago	Rock	✓	November 26, 2010
"Let It Snow! Let It Snow! Let It Snow!"	Dean Martin	Holiday	✗	November 26, 2010
"Bad Romance"	Lady Gaga	Pop	✓	November 26, 2010
"Don't Forget"	Demi Lovato	Pop	✓	December 3, 2010
"I Need Love"	LL Cool J	Hip-Hop/Rap	✓	December 3, 2010
"Mama Do (Uh Oh, Uh Oh)"	Pixie Lott	Pop	✓	December 3, 2010
"My Prerogative"	Bobby Brown	R&B/Soul	✓	December 10, 2010
"Simply Irresistible"	Robert Palmer	Rock	✓	December 10, 2010
"The Lovecats"	The Cure	Pop	✓	December 17, 2010
"This Is How We Do It"	Montell Jordan	R&B/Soul	✓	December 17, 2010
"Lonely No More"	Rob Thomas	Pop	✓	December 17, 2010
"Ladies' Night"	Kool & the Gang	R&B/Soul	✗	December 24, 2010
"Heartbreaker"	Pat Benatar	Rock	✗	December 24, 2010
"Love Is a Battlefield"	Pat Benatar	Rock	✓	December 24, 2010
"It's the End of the World as We Know It (And I Feel Fine)"	R.E.M.	Alternative	✓	December 31, 2010
"Te Amo"	Rihanna	Pop	✓	December 31, 2010
"Seven Nation Army"	The White Stripes	Alternative	✓	December 31, 2010
"Nothin' on You"	B.o.B feat. Bruno Mars	Hip-Hop/Rap	✓	January 7, 2011
"Sail On"	Commodores	R&B/Soul	✗	January 7, 2011
"Our House"	Madness	Pop	✓	January 14, 2011
"Happy Ending"	Mika	Pop	✓	January 14, 2011
"Informer"	Snow	Hip-Hop/Rap	✓	January 21, 2011
"Falling Down"	Selena Gomez & the Scene	Pop	✓	January 21, 2011
"Don't Get Me Wrong"	The Pretenders	Pop	✓	January 28, 2011
"Stand"	R.E.M.	Pop	✓	January 28, 2011
"Right Now (Na Na Na)"	Akon	R&B/Soul	✓	February 18, 2011
"Just What I Needed"	The Cars	Pop	✗	February 18, 2011
"You Might Think"	The Cars	Pop	✓	February 18, 2011
"Hot n Cold"	Katy Perry	Pop	✓	February 18, 2011
"Thinking of You"	Katy Perry	Pop	✓	February 18, 2011
"Waking Up In Vegas"	Katy Perry	Pop	✓	February 18, 2011

- Due to reasons unknown some Lips songs have been delisted from the Marketplace

=== Foreign songs ===
Ever since the release of Deutsche Partyknaller, some songs have been made available as downloadable content in other regions. These are categorized as Region Locked Songs, since it is impossible to download them outside of their respective locales. The following a list of these foreign songs.

Region(s)	Language	Song Title	Artist	Music Video	Release date
DE only.	German	"Geile Zeit"	Juli	✓	October 30, 2009
DE only.	German	"Dis wo ich herkomm"	Samy Deluxe	✓	October 30, 2009
DE only.	German	"Nichts bringt mich runter"	Ich + Ich	✓	October 30, 2009
ES only.	Spanish	"Turnedo"	Iván Ferreiro	✓	November 27, 2009
ES only.	Spanish	"Ama, Ama, Ama, Y Ensancha El Alma"	Extremoduro	✗	November 27, 2009
NR only.	English	"Cara Mia"	Måns Zelmerlöw	✓	December 25, 2009
NR only.	English	"Hope & Glory"	Måns Zelmerlöw	✗	December 25, 2009
DE only.	German	"Baby, Du Siehst Gut Aus!"	Bakkushan	✓	January 15, 2010
DE only.	German	"Schnappi"	Schnappi	✓	January 15, 2010

Key:

- DE: Germany
- ES: Spain/Mexico
- NR: Scandinavian countries

== Song packs ==
=== Artist packs ===
Song packs offer three songs at a discounted price. They were made available on April 10, 2009, for the first time. Artist song packs cost 440 MSP each. The Colbie Caillat Song Pack was only available through a special promotion starting October 20, 2009. However, it was released one month later as worldwide DLC.

Artist	Songs	Genre	Release date
Ne-Yo	"Hate That I Love You", "Closer", "So Sick"	R&B/Soul	April 10, 2009
Coldplay	"Speed of Sound", "The Scientist", "In My Place"	Alternative	April 10, 2009
Creedence Clearwater Revival	"Lookin' Out My Back Door", "Bad Moon Rising", "Who'll Stop The Rain"	Rock	April 17, 2009
New Edition	"Mr. Telephone Man", "Cool It Now", "If It Isn't Love"	R&B/Soul	May 15, 2009
P!nk	"Get The Party Started", "Don't Let Me Get Me", "So What"	Pop	July 10, 2009
Colbie Caillat	"The Little Things", "Realize", "Fallin' For You"	Pop	November 20, 2009
The Supremes	"Baby Love", "Stop! In The Name Of Love", "You Can't Hurry Love"	R&B/Soul	October 23, 2009
Marvin Gaye	"Let's Get It On", "How Sweet It Is to Be Loved by You", "What's Going On"	R&B/Soul	November 13, 2009
Lady Gaga	"Eh, Eh (Nothing Else I Can Say)", "LoveGame", "Poker Face"	Pop	November 27, 2009
The Temptations	"My Girl", "Papa Was A Rollin' Stone", "Ain't Too Proud To Beg"	R&B/Soul	December 4, 2009
Paula Abdul	"Forever Your Girl", "Rush Rush", "Opposites Attract"	Pop	December 18, 2009
Dean Martin	"I'll Be Home for Christmas", "Silent Night", "Silver Bells"	Holiday	December 18, 2009
The Miracles	"I Second That Emotion", "Love Machine (Part 1)", "The Tracks Of My Tears"	R&B/Soul	January 1, 2010
The Cardigans	"Erase/Rewind", "Carnival", "My Favourite Game"	Rock	January 29, 2010
Marvin Gaye & Tammi Terrell	"Ain't No Mountain High Enough", "Ain't Nothing Like The Real Thing", "You're All I Need To Get By"	R&B/Soul	February 5, 2010
Snow Patrol	"Chasing Cars", "Take Back the City", "Spitting Games"	Alternative	February 19, 2010
Commodores	"Easy", "Brick House", "Three Times A Lady"	R&B/Soul	March 5, 2010
Norah Jones	"Come Away With Me", "Don't Know Why", "Sunrise"	Pop	March 26, 2010
The Four Tops	"Reach Out I'll Be There", "I Can't Help Myself (Sugar Pie, Honey Bunch)", "Baby I Need Your Loving"	R&B/Soul	April 2, 2010
The Go-Go's	"We Got The Beat", "Our Lips Are Sealed", "Head over Heels"	New Wave	April 30, 2010
Miley Cyrus	"7 Things", "See You Again", "The Climb"	Pop	May 21, 2010
Elton John	"Crocodile Rock", "Don't Go Breaking My Heart", "Your Song"	Pop/Rock	May 28, 2010
3 Doors Down	"Here Without You", "It's Not My Time", "When I'm Gone"	Rock	June 25, 2010
Pat Benatar	"Fire and Ice", "Hit Me With Your Best Shot", "We Belong"	Rock	July 30, 2010
Andrew Lloyd Webber Vol. 1	"All I Ask of You", "Love Changes Everything", "Memory"	Pop	August 13, 2010
Huey Lewis and The News Vol. 1	"Workin' for a Livin'", "Hip To Be Square", "If This Is It"	Rock	August 27, 2010
Huey Lewis and The News Vol. 2	"The Heart of Rock & Roll", "Do You Believe In Love", "Stuck with You"	Rock	August 27, 2010
Andrew Lloyd Webber Vol. 2	"Any Dream Will Do", "Don't Cry For Me Argentina", "The Phantom of the Opera"	Pop	September 10, 2010
Death Cab for Cutie	"Soul Meets Body", "Meet Me On The Equinox", "I Will Possess Your Heart"	Alternative	September 24, 2010
Michael Bublé	"Everything", "Haven't Met You Yet", "Home"	Pop	September 24, 2010
Chicago	"Hard Habit to Break", "Hard To Say I'm Sorry", "I Don't Wanna Live Without Your Love"	Rock	November 26, 2010
Lady Gaga 5 song pack	"Bad Romance", "Eh Eh (Nothing Else I Can Say)", "LoveGame", "Paparazzi", "Poker Face"	Pop	November 26, 2010
Mika	"Love Today", "Lollipop", "Happy Ending"	Pop	January 14, 2011
The Cars	"Drive", "Just What I Needed", "You Might Think"	Pop	February 18, 2011
Katy Perry	"Hot n Cold", "Thinking Of You", "Waking Up In Vegas"	Pop	February 18, 2011

=== Themed packs ===
In addition, several miscellaneous song packs are available to choose from various sources. Some are gotten by using the various codes found in either Lips: Number One Hits or Lips: Canta en Español. In the case of NOH, Players can get one of the song packs at no cost. It is unknown whether or not players will be able to purchase other packs at a later date. The following is a list of the bundles and their genre:

Game	Pack Title	Songs	Theme	Release date
Number One Hits	Hearts & Heartbreak Tour	James Blunt – "1973", Daniel Powter – "Bad Day", Robbie Williams – "Eternity", Daniel Bedingfield – "If You're Not the One", Jewel – "You Were Meant For Me"	Pop	October 20, 2009
Number One Hits	Turn It Up To 11 Tour	Thirty Seconds to Mars – "From Yesterday", Coldplay – "Lost!", Nickelback – "Photograph", Hoobastank – "The Reason", My Chemical Romance – "Welcome to the Black Parade"	Alternative	October 20, 2009
Number One Hits	House Party	LL Cool J – "Going Back To Cali", Bobby Brown – "My Prerogative", Janet Jackson – "Nasty", Paula Abdul – "Straight Up", Montell Jordan – "This Is How We Do It"	Classic R&B/Soul	October 20, 2009
Canta en Español	CEE 5-Pack	Maná - "Vivir sin Aire", Duncan Dhu - "100 Gaviotas", Celtas Cortos - "Retales de una Vida", Paty Cantú - "Dejame ir", Ella Baila Sola - "Lo Echamos a Suertes"	Varies	November 25, 2009

== Promotions ==
- In December 2008, a-ha's Take On Me was available at no cost as DLC for other countries. This promotion was discontinued around June 2009.
- In April 2009, AT&T and iNiS presented the Lips Open Mic contest, in which the winner was to get a song and their respective music video on Lips. The winner of this contest was the electro band, ForeverGirl. On June 11, their song Shake The World was made available as free downloadable content through the Xbox Live Marketplace.
- In June 2009, Microsoft teamed up with CrystalRoc, makers of customized music instruments to create limited edition “Lips” wireless microphones made with Swarovski Elements. These special microphones will be handed out as rewards in future contests.
- In October 2009, a partnership was made together with retailer Best Buy and pop star Colbie Caillat to release an exclusive three song pack. This song pack was only available as a retail bonus from buying Lips: Number One Hits at Best Buy. The song pack was released as worldwide DLC one month later.
- Number One Hits includes a coupon code that lets players download a themed 5 song pack for free. It is unknown whether or not players will be able to purchase the others at a later date. Canta en Español also features a similar promotion.
