= G.W. Scott and Sons =

UK business

- Founded: 1661
- Founder: William Scott
- Defunct: 1967
- Headquarters: 144 Charing Cross Road,
- Products: Trunks, Picnic-sets, Leather Goods, Handbags

G.W. Scott and Sons was a producer of fine wickerwork crafts, basketry, and luxury leather goods for over 300 years. Founded in 1661 in the city of London, England, in the United Kingdom, the company ceased production in 1967.

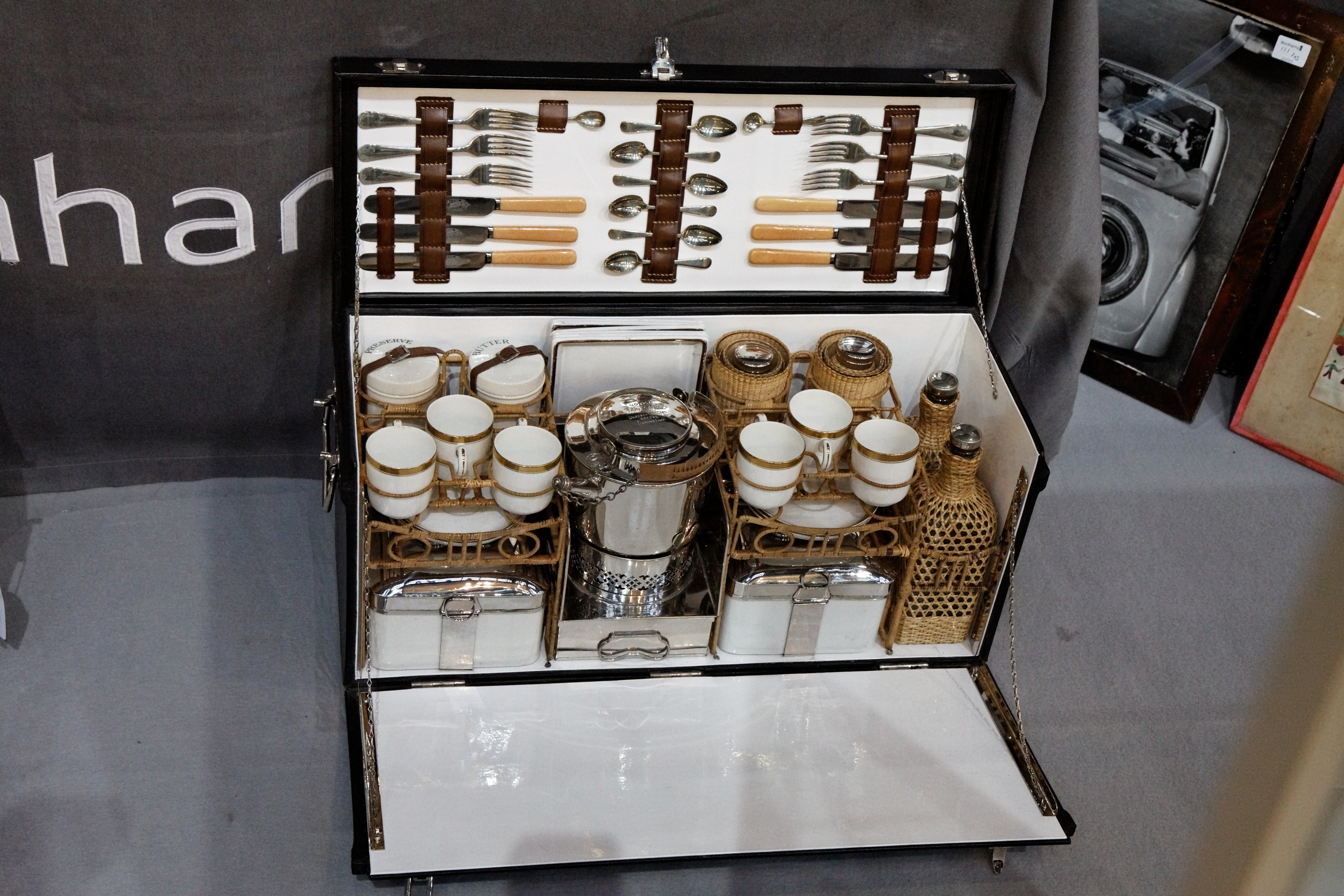
A luxury picnic basket for six people, produced in 1910 by G.W. Scott & Sons.

== History ==
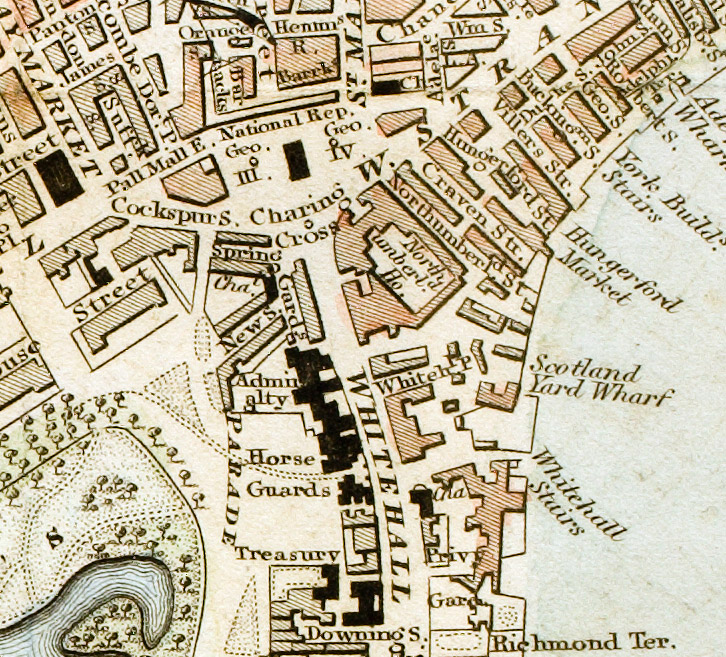
A London map of 1883 showing Charing Cross Road.

G.W. Scott and Sons opened their first store in London, England, in 1661. Due to fire damage sustained during the Great Fire of London, they were forced to relocated their company to first Old Compton Street and then Charing Cross Road, in the central part of the city. The company is likely most well known as having developed the modern form of the picnic basket, which was unveiled in 1851 during the "Great Exhibition of the Works of Industry of All Nations" held in Crystal Palace of Hyde Park, London, the first of many world fair exhibitions during the Victorian era. They also achieved a measure of international fame when G.W. Scott and Sons created 30 foot tall sculptures decorating the mall parade route for the coronation of Queen Elizabeth II, in addition to making the cradles used by the monarchy. Besides making specialty items for the British royal family and their residences (including silver baskets for Buckingham Palace), the company was also contracted by the government during the Second World War to make campaign trunks and furniture for the Army, and double hampers for parachute drops by the Airborne Division of the Royal Air Force.

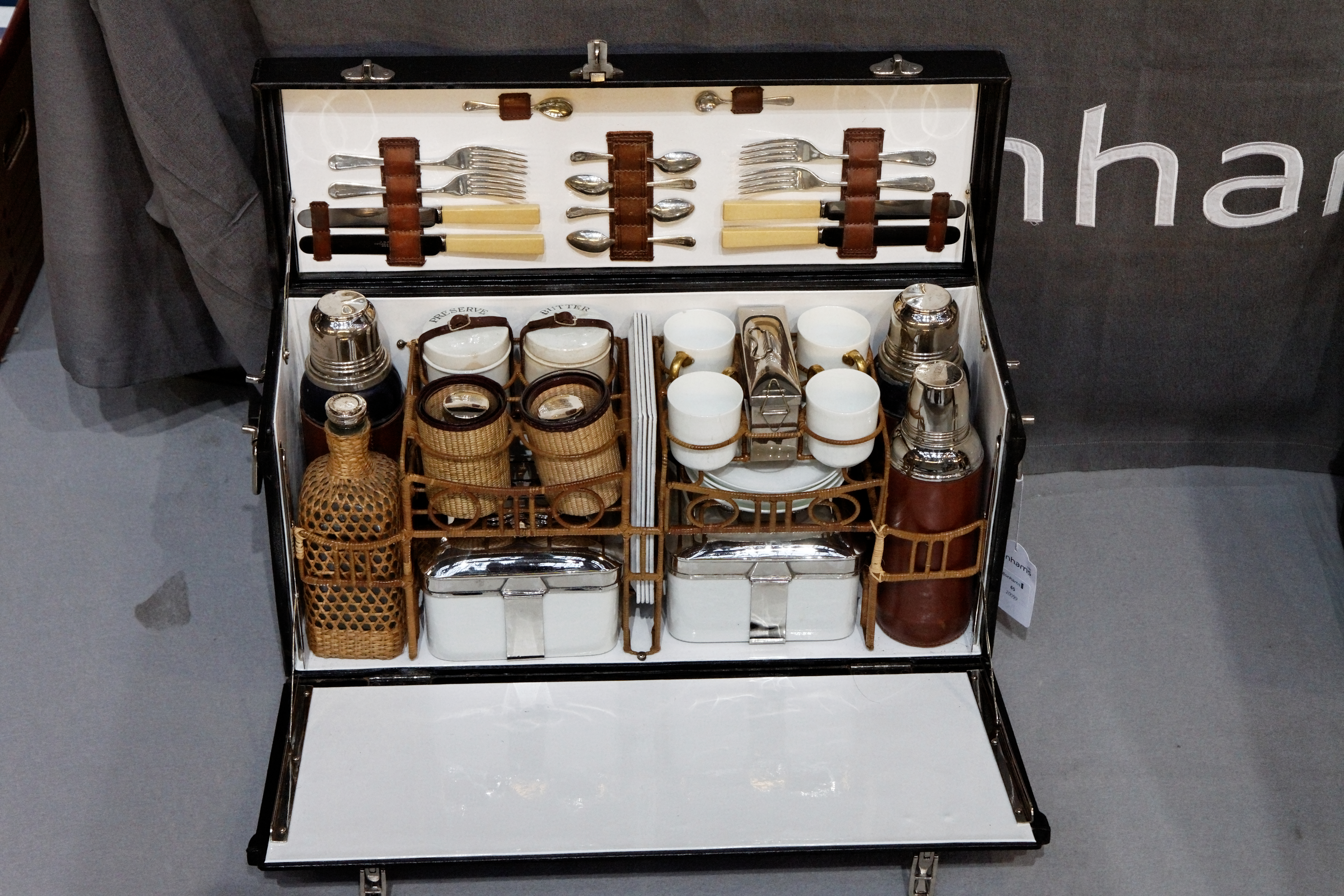
Another picnic basket, this one from 1909, with wicker work accoutrements.

=== Products ===
Aside from a variety of wicker products sourced from Somerset willows, and luxury leather goods (primarily trunks and tea caddies), the company is most well known for their production of their "Coracle" brand Fitted Luncheon and Tea Baskets, which were popular throughout Europe during the Victorian and Edwardian eras. They were also particularly well-regarded as specialists in the production of cane furniture.

=== Royal warrant ===
In 1961 GW Scott was listed as a royal warrant holder for King George VI, marking them as the primary supplier of basketry to the royal family.

=== Closure ===
The company lost much of its business when the demand for luxury picnic and tea accessories waned after the Gilded Age. It finally closed its doors in 1967, 306 years after the founding of the business.

== Re-founding of the brand ==
The brand was re-founded in 2016, on the 165th anniversary of when G.W. Scott invented his picnic basket. The products were initially sold online, and later through the retail outlet, "Mr. Porter".

== Bibliography ==
- London Metropolitan Archives: City of London, "B/SCT/1-17 Day books (2 series);"
- London Metropolitan Archives: City of London, Register of accounts; B/SCT/28 Goods received book;
- London Metropolitan Archives: City of London, B/SCT/34, 35 Newspaper cutting, etc.
- Noyce, Diana The Rise of the Picnic Hamper: Its Pleasurable and Macabre Uses in Nineteenth-Century Britain, oxford Symposium, 2013"
