= Coco (album) =

Studio album by Colbie Caillat
- Released: July 10, 2007
- Recorded: 2007
- Studios: Revolver Studios (Los Angeles, California)
- Genres: Pop; pop rock; folk pop
- Length: 43:28
- Label: Universal Republic
- Producer: Mikal Blue

Colbie Caillat chronology
Coco (2007)	Breakthrough (2009)

Singles from Coco
- 1. "Bubbly" Released: May 15, 2007; 2. "Realize" Released: January 29, 2008; 3. "The Little Things" Released: March 7, 2008

Coco is the debut studio album by American singer-songwriter Colbie Caillat. The album was released on July 10, 2007, in the United States through Universal Republic. After her prominence on MySpace – following several shots at singing competitions – the singer enlisted English producer Mikal Blue to help her bringing her sound to the forefront, thus recording what would be her debut album. Critics were ambivalent towards the album, with some praising its melodies and her charm throughout the record, while others criticized its clichéd lyrics and monotonous sound.

Its lead single, "Bubbly", released on May 15, 2007, was a huge international hit, which led her to attain significant notoriety, prompting the album to debut at number five on the US Billboard 200, selling 51,000 copies in its first week. It also became Caillat's best-selling album to date, selling 2,100,000 copies in the United States and over 3,000,000 copies around the world. It peaked inside the top-ten in four countries and top-twenty in over eight nations. Caillat supported the album with the Coco World Tour, as well as other two singles: "Realize" and "The Little Things", that became minor hits. "Somethin' Special" was released as a promo support the 2008 Summer Olympics in Beijing, China, while "Midnight Bottle" was a promotional single and a success in Brazil.

== Background and recording ==
Early in her life, at age eleven, Colbie Caillat started her singing debut, venturing in talent shows and school performances in her city. Daughter of Fleetwood Mac's producer, Ken Caillat, the singer grew up listening to the songs that her father used to mix at their Malibu beach house. She attributed her insterest in doing music after Lauryn Hill's role in the film Sister Act 2 (1993), taking vocal lessons as a result of the inspiration. In early 2000s, she auditioned for American Idol but was rejected at the pre-audition stage and was unable to sing for the judges. The second time she auditioned for the show, she sang her own original song "Bubbly" and was rejected once again. However, Caillat expressed gratitude at the judges' decision, saying "I was shy. I was nervous. I didn't look the greatest. I wasn't ready for it yet. I was glad, when I auditioned, that they said no."

Soon after, Caillat met English producer Mikal Blue, who hired her to sing on techno songs used at fashion shows. Caillat began playing the acoustic guitar at the age of 19 and Blue helped her record her first song. Later on, songwriter and producer Jason Reeves came on board, bringing his artistic expertise to enhance Caillat's growing talents. A year prior to her breakthrough, Caillat was working at a tanning salon on weekdays, until one of her friends decided to build her a profile on social networking platform MySpace and posted some of her original songs to the site. Little response was generated until she uploaded the then-exclusive track "Bubbly". As word spread, her MySpace page started attracting thousands of daily visitors. With 6,240 friends amassed, Rolling Stone recognized her as one of the top female artists on the platform. The popularity of Caillat's MySpace profile led her to become the number-one unsigned singer in her genre for four consecutive months.

After her MySpace popularity, Caillat crafted the basic melodies, often composing in her bathroom for its reverb-heavy acoustics, and later collaborated with Blue and Reeves for artistic input. Boasting such an impressive milestone, she attracted the attention of record labels and eventually signed with Universal Republic as her online following surpassed 100,000. As she recalled: "It happened so fast. I was just writing songs and putting them up on MySpace, and then I got a record deal. Then it was like, 'Whoa, you're going on tour with the Goo Goo Dolls this summer.' So it was brand-new."

== Music ==
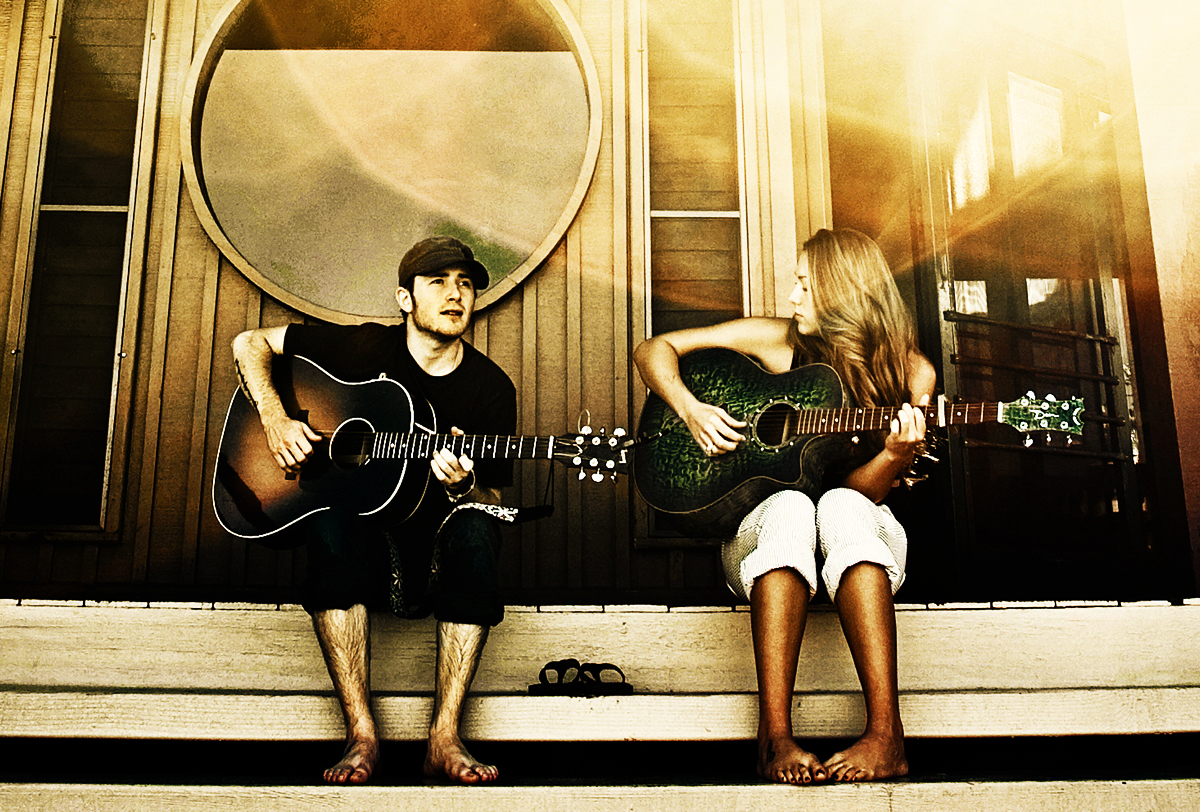
Caillat with the album's main collaborator Jason Reeves, who co-wrote 10 out of the 12 songs on the regular edition of the album.

Coco was produced by Mikal Blue, with additional production by Caillat, her father Ken Caillat and Jason Reeves. Its title derivates from Caillat's nickname that was given to her when she was a young child. The album allows her to "show off her warm and inviting voice", as noted by Washington Post's Allison Stewart. Stewart also considered it "a wispy and amiable exercise in coffeehouse soul that draws equally from Carole King, John Mayer and, more to the point, Jack Johnson, who shares Caillat's love of mildly played, determinedly pleasant folk." Jason Lymangrover of AllMusic described it as "a summertime record suitable for both the coffeehouse and the beach." For Bill Lamb from About.com, "this is a CD to tuck into your picnic basket on a summer day." Caillat herself considered the album's content "fresh and sunny".

Lyrically, the album features "numerous love songs [that] find Caillat practically hyperventilating over romantic relationships," as noted by Plugged In authors Adam R. Holz and Bob Smithouser, with intimacy and drowning sorrows also being featured themes. The opening track, "Oxygen", "glides by in a serene soft rock shuffle, with Caillat's vocal being compared to those of Joss Stone and Corinne Bailey Rae. Lyrically, the song has Colbie joyously incapacitated [in a metaphoric way], wanting to share her feelings for a special guy". The follow-up track, "The Little Things" talks about love reconciliation, while "One Fine Wire" deals with emotional distress. Its lead single, "Bubbly", is built over "simple strummed acoustic guitar, a whisper of drums for a beat," and as described by Lamb, "Colbie Caillat's unadorned singing". Lyrically, it suggests intimacy where a couple "is getting playful under the covers." It was compared to Jack Johnson's "Bubble Toes" by Stewart.

"Feelings Show" follows, using "unobtrusive acoustic guitar, mild grooves and a subtle beat, until it builds up for the chorus. Caillat's voice "reaches the upper levels of her range with sensual whispers", as noted by Blogcritics author Jeff Martin. Its lyrics find Caillat "request[ing] that a guy 'take it real slow' while she sorts through conflicting emotions". The sixth track, "Midnight Bottle", has Colbie "chasing the pain of a bad relationship down with alcohol", while "Realize" is about "a potential perfect relationship if only the other person would just realize it." "Battle" touches upon themes of disappointment of disintegrating love, the sweet "Tailor Made" has lyrics of "urg[ing] a girlfriend to quit waffling and invest in a man who’s perfect for her", and "Magic" was considered more explicit with lyrics such as "Wake me with your lips/Come at me from above/Yeah I need you". The conflicts of staying in and fighting for a relationship are the main themes of "Tied Down", while the last song, "Capri", has a "life-affirming melody" with lyrics about "a pregnant woman and the precious baby she’s carrying."

== Release and promotion ==
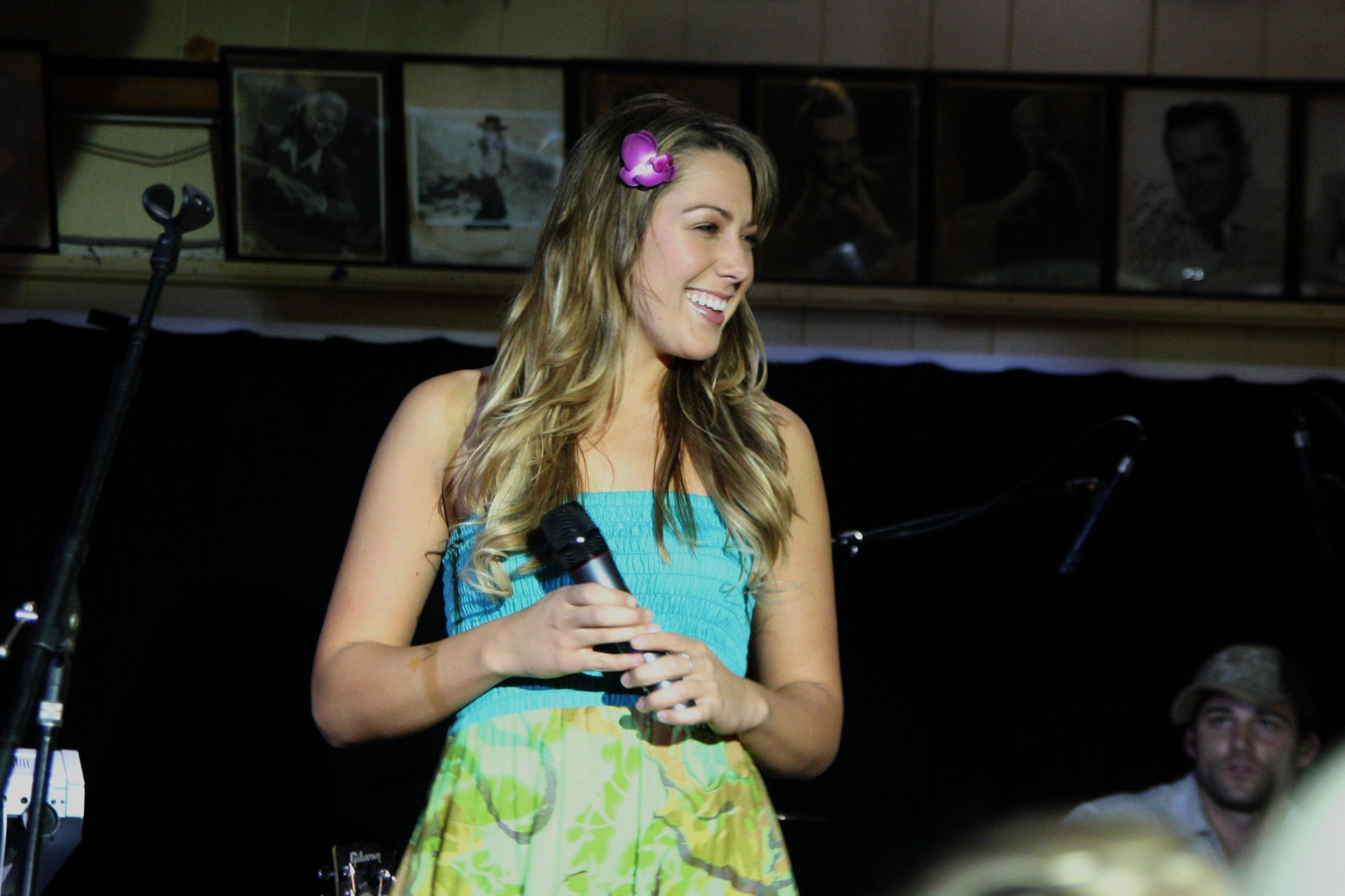
Caillat performing at The Malibu Inn, 2007.

Coco was released on July 10, 2007, in Australia and Asia and a week later in North America. Its deluxe edition was released on September 3, 2008, in Japan and November 11, 2008, worldwide. The album's first single, "Bubbly", was released on May 15, 2007, in the United States. It became a smash hit across the globe, with four number-ones around the world, including Australia, while also reaching the top-ten in almost each country it charted. In the United States, it peaked at number five; it remains Caillat's biggest hit in the US to date, and her only single to reach the top ten of the Billboard Hot 100. The single's music video, directed by Liz Friedlander, aired on MTV, VH1 and CMT. A still from the music video was used as the cover for the album. It was featured in the hit PlayStation 2 karaoke game SingStar Pop Vol 2 released in late September 2008 in the United States, and the SingStar Hottest Hits in PAL regions.

It was followed by a second single, "Realize", officially released on January 22, 2008, for airplay in the United States. The song peaked at number 20 on the Billboard Hot 100 chart, becoming her second top-twenty hit in the U.S. Caillat and her backup band performed "Realize" as the featured musical performance that closed the May 23, 2008, broadcast of The Tonight Show with Jay Leno. The third single, "The Little Things", was released in Germany on March 7, 2008, and on October 28, 2008, in the United States. Unlike its predecessor, the song managed to chart in some European countries. However, in the United States, it only peaked at number seven on US Billboard Bubbling Under Hot 100. In 2008, she recorded a French translated version of the song, called "Ces Petits Rien". According to one of the pictures on Caillat's MySpace page, it was assumed that her song "Battle" would have been the fourth and final single from Coco. Because of her collaboration with Jason Mraz, "Lucky", being released as a single and with the release of her second album, it was assumed that the single and music video were canceled and all promotion was then focused on "Lucky" and her second album Breakthrough.

Some songs from the album were released as promotional singles. First was the song "Tailor Made", released in Netherlands as a promotional single in 2008. Later, "Midnight Bottle" was released as a single in January 2008 only in Brazil as soundtrack song of Brazilian telenovela The Three Sisters. The song peaked at number one in Brazil. "Somethin' Special" was released as the third promotional on July 29, 2008, to support to the American athletes participating in the 2008 Summer Olympics in Beijing, China. The song was also the opening song of the 2009 film Bride Wars and appeared on the AT&T Team USA Soundtrack.

Coco was also promoted with two tours: Coco Summer Tour in 2007 and Coco World Tour in 2008. To commemorate the 15th anniversary of the album, Caillat embarked on a tour to celebrate it in 2022.

== Critical reception ==
Professional ratings
Review scores
Source	Rating
About.com	4/5 stars
AllMusic	4/5 stars
Blogcritics	3/5 stars
Entertainment Weekly	B−
MusicOMH	1/5 stars
Rolling Stone	2/5 stars
Slant	2/5 stars
Sputnikmusic	3/5 stars
USA Today	2.5/4 stars

Coco received generally positive reviews, with critics praising Caillat's warm vocals and breezy pop sound, though some criticized the album for being overly safe and lacking a distinctive identity. AllMusic editor Stephen Thomas Erlewine gave the album 4 out of 5 stars, writing that "she sings about simple, everyday things in an unassuming manner, letting her melodies and girl-next-door charm carry the day". Similarly, Bill Lamb rated the album with four stars in his About.com review, praising it for being "a perfect album for relaxing and watching the world go by on a warm afternoon. Despite some insinuations of calculated efforts from her family and well-connected friends, Coco is pure, easy pop with abundant familiar charm." Chuck Arnold of People magazine said that "although the midtempo tracks start to blend together, this California girl keeps the sun-kissed sounds coming." Daryl Easlea from BBC Music claimed the album " is very pleasant indeed, perfectly produced, and is packed with tracks like Bubbly, the sort of record destined to reside on a Magic Playlist for the rest of the year." Jeff Martin of Blogcritics praised Coco as a "remarkably listenable album," highlighting Caillat's "smoky" vocals, acoustic sound, and "mellow singer-songwriter" style. He called it a confident debut with a warm, summery atmosphere, while noting that some songwriting was predictable.

Other critics offered more mixed assessments. USA Today critic Elysa Gardner described the album as "caffeinated pop," praising Caillat's "subtly husky voice" and "laid-back delivery" while comparing her acoustic pop style to Norah Jones, though she felt some tracks were overly polished and formulaic. Jonathan Bernstein of Entertainment Weekly gave Coco a B− rating, praising its "warm-weather" acoustic charm and consistent sound but criticizing its overly subdued delivery. Sputnikmusic praised the album's overall quality but criticized its "lack of identity," calling it "merely another good pop album in a sea of other good pop albums." Rolling Stone's Caryn Ganz similarly found Caillat's style difficult to define, writing that despite her "soulful swing," the album's sunny material lacked distinction. Sal Cinquemani of Slant Magazine was less favorable, criticizing Caillat's "acoustic-soul-meets-California-pop" naming it "completely innocuous", adding, "her rhymes are rudimentary, her voice is unspectacular. She cites Lauryn Hill as a primary influence but India.Arie is a more apt point of comparison: wholesome, vanilla, and utterly forgettable. Coco makes me crinkle my nose—and not in the good way," he concluded. Nick Oliver of musicOMH panned the album, rating with 1 out of 5 stars, labelling it a "glossy, utterly soulless album."

== Commercial performance ==
Coco debuted straight at number five on the US Billboard 200 chart on the week chart of August 4, 2007, selling 51,000 copies, with 56% of the album's first week sales coming from digital copies. Throughout the other weeks, the album received an increase in its sales, whereas in its fourteenth week, the album moved back to the top-ten, climbing to number 10, with sales of 50,000 copies, bringing a total of 417,000 copies solely in the U.S. The album was certified 2× Platinum by the RIAA with shipments to U.S. retailers of 2,000,000 units. The album also managed to debut inside the top-ten in Brazil, Denmark and Norway. In the Danish Album Chart, the album debuted at number 20 on March 14, 2008, before peaking at number 8 the following week, remaining a total of six weeks on the chart, whereas in Norway, the album debuted at number 36, and kept on climbing the following four weeks until it reached its peak position of number six. After falling out of the top ten, the album climbed to number 10 in its ninth week. It remained for fourteen weeks on the chart.

In Australia, the album debuted at number 39 on the ARIA Albums Chart, on the week of April 13, 2008. After fluctuating on the charts for five weeks, it climbed to its peak position of number thirteen, where it remained for another week. The album remained inside the top-twenty for extra three weeks and inside the chart as a whole for sixteen weeks. In Germany, it debuted at number 82 on the week of September 14, 2007 and peaked at number 15 on October 5, 2007. It stayed on the chart consecutively until February 1, 2008, until it re-entered on March 21, 2008, at number 85 and left the chart three weeks later at number 76, on the week of April 11, 2008, bringing a total of twenty-four weeks on the chart receiving a "Gold" certification. In some European countries, although it peaked outside the top-ten or top-twenty, the album managed to remain at their charts for longer weeks. In Switzerland, it peaked at number 23 (for two weeks), remained for 38 weeks, spending almost a year inside the album's chart, in France, the song peaked in its twenty-third week at number 15 and only left the chart in its fortieth week on June 9, 2009 (more than year following its March 1, 2008 debut), and in Netherlands, it spent 45 weeks inside the chart for over a year, peaking twice at number 11: in its eight-week on February 2, 2008, and in its thirty-fourth week on August 2, 2008.

== Track listing ==
All tracks are written by Colbie Caillat and Jason Reeves, except where noted.

Coco – Standard edition
No.	Title	Length
1.	"Oxygen"	3:51
2.	"The Little Things"	3:46
3.	"One Fine Wire" (Caillat, Mikal Blue, Reeves)	3:37
4.	"Bubbly"	3:17
5.	"Feelings Show" (Caillat, Blue, Reeves)	3:10
6.	"Midnight Bottle"	3:41
7.	"Realize" (Caillat, Blue, Reeves)	4:05
8.	"Battle" (Caillat, Blue)	4:03
9.	"Tailor Made"	4:30
10.	"Magic"	3:25
11.	"Tied Down"	3:07
12.	"Capri" (Caillat)	2:56
Total length:		43:28

Coco – Deluxe edition
No.	Title	Writer(s)	Length
13.	"Tell Him" (live; Lauryn Hill cover)	Hill	4:53
14.	"Brand New Me"	Theresa Bell; Jerry Butler; Kenneth Gamble	3:21
15.	"Somethin' Special" (Beijing Olympic Mix)	Caillat; Blue	3:06
16.	"Circles"	Caillat; Blue	3:53
17.	"Hoy Me Voy" (featuring Juanes)	Caillat; García DeEnterria; Juanes; Emmanuel Lehmann	3:25
18.	"Turn Your Lights Down Low" (live; Bob Marley cover)	Marley	5:57
19.	"Magic" (piano version)	Caillat; Reeves	3:20
20.	"Bubbly" (acoustic version)	Caillat; Reeves	3:33

Coco – iTunes Store edition (bonus track)
No.	Title	Writer(s)	Length
13.	"Older"	Caillat; Blue	3:35

Coco – United Kingdom edition (bonus track)
No.	Title	Writer(s)	Length
14.	"Dreams Collide"	Caillat	4:04

Coco – Japanese deluxe edition (bonus tracks)
No.	Title	Writer(s)	Length
13.	"Dreams Collide"	Caillat	4:04
14.	"Circles"	Caillat; Blue	3:53
15.	"Bubbly" (acoustic version)	Caillat; Reeves	3:33

Coco – United Kingdom deluxe edition (bonus tracks)
No.	Title	Writer(s)	Length
13.	"Tell Him" (live; Lauryn Hill cover)	Hill	4:53
14.	"Somethin' Special" (Beijing Olympic Mix)	Caillat; Blue	3:06
15.	"Turn Your Lights Down Low" (live; Bob Marley cover)	Marley	5:57
16.	"Bubbly" (acoustic version)	Caillat; Reeves	3:33
17.	"Magic" (piano version)	Caillat; Reeves	3:20
18.	"Dreams Collide"	Caillat	4:04

Coco – Australia deluxe edition (bonus tracks)
No.	Title	Length
13.	"Tell Him" (live; Lauryn Hill cover)	4:53
14.	"Here Comes the Sun"
15.	"Somethin' Special" (Beijing Olympic Mix)	3:06
16.	"Circles"	3:53
17.	"Older"	3:35
18.	"Turn Your Lights Down Low" (live; Bob Marley cover)	5:57
19.	"Magic" (piano version)	3:20
20.	"Bubbly" (acoustic version)	3:33
21.	"Dreams Collide"	4:04

Coco – Latin America deluxe edition (bonus tracks)
No.	Title	Length
18.	"You" (with Schiller)	4:16
19.	"Turn Your Lights Down Low" (live; Bob Marley cover)	5:57
20.	"Magic" (piano version)	3:20
21.	"Bubbly" (acoustic version)	3:33

== Charts ==
=== Weekly charts ===
Chart (2007–2008)	Peak position
Australian Albums (ARIA)	13
Austrian Albums (Ö3 Austria)	26
Belgian Albums (Ultratop Flanders)	22
Belgian Albums (Ultratop Wallonia)	27
Brazilian Albums (ABPD)	4
Canadian Albums (Billboard)	12
Danish Albums (Hitlisten)	8
Dutch Albums (Album Top 100)	11
French Albums (SNEP)	15
German Albums (Offizielle Top 100)	15
Greek Albums (IFPI)	30
Japanese Albums (Oricon)	25
New Zealand Albums (RMNZ)	12
Norwegian Albums (VG-lista)	6
Portuguese Albums (AFP)	12
Scottish Albums (Official Charts)	56
Swedish Albums (Sverigetopplistan)	15
Swiss Albums (Schweizer Hitparade)	23
UK Albums (Official Charts)	44
US Billboard 200	5
US Top Alternative Albums (Billboard)	1
US Top Rock Albums (Billboard)	1

=== Year-end charts ===
Chart (2007)	Position
US Billboard 200	88
US Top Rock Albums (Billboard)	15

Chart (2008)	Position
Australian Albums (ARIA)	77
Belgian Albums (Ultratop Flanders)	95
Dutch Albums (MegaCharts)	33
French Albums (SNEP)	101
US Billboard 200	18
US Top Rock Albums (Billboard)	7

== Certifications ==
Region	Certification	Certified units/sales
Australia (ARIA)	Gold	35,000^{^}
France (SNEP)	Gold	50,000^{*}
Germany (BVMI)	Gold	100,000^{‡}
Netherlands (NVPI)	Gold	35,000^{^}
New Zealand (RMNZ)	Gold	7,500^{^}
Singapore (RIAS)	Gold	5,000^{*}
Switzerland (IFPI Switzerland)	Gold	15,000^{^}
United Kingdom (BPI)	Silver	60,000^{‡}
United States (RIAA)	3× Platinum	3,000,000^{‡}
^{*} Sales figures based on certification alone.^{^} Shipments figures based on certification alone.^{‡} Sales+streaming figures based on certification alone.

== Release history ==
Coco release history
Region	Date	Edition	Format	Label	Catalog	Ref(s)
Asia	July 10, 2007	Standard	CD; digital download	Universal Music	1740518	
Australia	July 10, 2007	Standard	CD; digital download	Universal Music	1740518	
Canada	July 17, 2007	Standard	CD; digital download	Universal Music	B000921902	
United States	July 17, 2007	Standard	CD; digital download	Universal Republic	B000921902	
United Kingdom	August 10, 2007	Standard	CD; digital download	Island	1740518	
Europe	March 14, 2008	Standard	CD; digital download	Island	0602517367357	
Japan	March 19, 2008	Standard	CD; digital download	Universal Japan	UICU-9055	
Japan	September 3, 2008	Deluxe	CD; digital download	Universal Japan	UICY-91686	
Australia	November 11, 2008	Deluxe	CD; digital download	Universal Music	–	
Europe	November 11, 2008	Deluxe	CD; digital download	Island	0602517872943	
United Kingdom	November 11, 2008	Deluxe	CD; digital download	Island	1785141	
United States	November 11, 2008	Deluxe	CD; digital download	Universal Republic	B001210202	
