= Realize (Colbie Caillat song) =

2008 single by Colbie Caillat

Single by Colbie Caillat

from the album Coco
- Released: January 22, 2008
- Recorded: 2007
- Studio: Revolver Studios (Sherman Oaks, CA)
- Genre: Folk pop
- Length: 4:05
- Label: Universal Republic
- Songwriters: Colbie Caillat; Jason Reeves; Mikal Blue
- Producer: Mikal Blue

Colbie Caillat singles chronology
"Mistletoe" (2007)	"Realize" (2008)	"The Little Things" (2008)

Music video
- "Realize" by Colbie Caillat on YouTube

"Realize" is a song by American singer-songwriter Colbie Caillat, taken from her debut album, Coco (2007). In the song, Caillat sings of having romantic feelings for a best friend. It was the follow-up to her worldwide debut hit, "Bubbly", and was officially released in January 2008 as the second single from the album, peaking at number 20 on the Billboard Hot 100 chart, becoming her second top-twenty hit in the US. The song also charted in Canada and the Netherlands, reaching the top 40 in both countries. It features uncredited harmony vocals by singer and songwriter Jason Reeves.

Caillat and her backup band performed "Realize" as the featured musical performance that closed the May 23, 2008, broadcast of The Tonight Show with Jay Leno.

== Music video ==
The music video debuted near the end of January 2008. The video starts with Caillat in her forest cabin, as she proceeds to write a note. She leaves her house with her note, and begins driving through the forest, as her best friend is shown in his city apartment, also writing a note. He also leaves his apartment with the note, and begins to drive through the city, and into the forest.

Meanwhile, Caillat has reached the city, and arrives at her friend's apartment in her Fiat Spyder 174 and her friend is also shown arriving at Caillat's cabin in his Ford Explorer. The two discover that neither is home, and slip their notes under each other's doors. Instead of leaving, the friend decides to sit and wait at Caillat's door, and Caillat is shown arriving as the two exchange smiles. Scenes also show Colbie singing the song in the forest, and with her guitar in the sunlight during sunset.

The video for "Realize" was filmed in both Toronto, Ontario and Haliburton, Ontario, Canada. Most of Colbie's driving scenes are on Highway 121 and Highway 118, two main arteries of the Haliburton region. It was directed by Philip Andelman.

As explained on her 2008 summer tour with John Mayer, there is a story behind this song. Caillat, Jason Reeves, and his roommate were a close group of three friends. Colbie was unaware that Jason's roommate had a huge crush on her, and when she found out about this later, she decided to base her song on this. Jason co-wrote the song from the perspective of his friend.

== Charts ==
=== Weekly charts ===
Chart (2008)	Peak position
Canada Hot 100 (Billboard)	37
Canada AC (Billboard)	20
Canada CHR/Top 40 (Billboard)	29
Canada Hot AC (Billboard)	22
Netherlands (Dutch Top 40)	19
Netherlands (Single Top 100)	61
US Billboard Hot 100	20
US Adult Contemporary (Billboard)	8
US Adult Pop Airplay (Billboard)	6
US Pop Airplay (Billboard)	10

=== Year-end charts ===
Chart (2008)	Position
US Billboard Hot 100	67
US Adult Contemporary (Billboard)	22
US Adult Top 40 (Billboard)	17
US Mainstream Top 40 (Billboard)	40

== Certifications ==
Region	Certification	Certified units/sales
United States (RIAA)	2× Platinum	2,000,000^{‡}
^{‡} Sales+streaming figures based on certification alone.

== Release history ==
Release dates and formats for "Realize"
Region	Date	Format	Label(s)	Ref.
United States	January 22, 2008	Mainstream airplay	Universal Republic	
