= Livingston (band) =

English rock band

- Origin: London, England
- Genres: Rock, Alternative,
- Years active: 2002-present
- Label: SPV
- Members: Beukes Willemse; Jakob Nebel; Chris Van Niekerk; Phil Magee; Jan Siekmann
- Past members: Paolo Serafini; Chris Borud

Livingston is a rock band originally formed in London in 2002. The band is composed of Beukes Willemse, Jakob Nebel, Chris van Niekerk, Phil Magee and Jan Siekmann. Livingston have released two albums with the third album Animal due for release in autumn 2014.

The band's breakthrough came with their first album "Sign Language" and the commercial success of the singles "Broken" and "Go" in Germany, Austria and Switzerland.

== Formation and name ==
Livingston was formed in London in 2002. Singer Beukes Willemse moved from South Africa to London, soon followed by fellow South African Chris Van Niekerk. There, they met German guitarist Jakob Nebel, who was studying at the Guitar Institute, along with Italian drummer Paolo Serafini. After spending years performing in and around London and going through several bass player changes, they eventually met Englishman Phil Magee, completing the final lineup.

Livingston take their name from the book Jonathan Livingston Seagull by Richard Bach.

== Releases ==
=== Early releases ===
Signed to Manta Ray Music from 2006 to 2009 Livingston released several singles, "Don’t stop now", "One Good Reason" and "Disease". They also released a live EP "Doorways" recorded at Monto Water Rats in London and an Acoustic EP "Wide Asleep" recorded in Berlin.

=== Sign Language ===
After years of touring which included several high-profile support tours in Germany the band gained interest and eventually signed to Universal Music Germany. Teamed with several different producers including Al Clay (A, Stereophonics, Reef), Roland Spremberg (Aha) and Moritz Enders and working in studios in LA, Texas, Hamburg and Berlin the band recorded and released their debut album in 2009 charting at no 16 in the German charts. The first single "Broken" reached no25 in the German single sales charts as well as being no1 3 times on the SWR3 airplay charts. This was followed up with the second single "Go" which was used for the official Winter Olympic's 2010 coverage by German TV station ZDF. The track's "Go" and "Disease" also featured in the film Chalet Girl (2011) with the band also making a cameo appearance.

=== Fire to Fire ===
For their second album the band teamed up with triple Grammy Award-winning David Bottrill (Tool, Silver chair, Peter Gabriel). Recording in Fisher Lane Studios near London the band worked on defining their sound. This session was followed later in 2011 with a stint in Hamburg, again with German producer Roland Spremberg to complete the second studio album "Fire to Fire" which was released early 2012.

=== Deeper Into the Fire ===
After separating from Universal Music and while in the process of finding their feet again the band decided to self release a second acoustic Ep using the crowd funding portal Pledgemusic. The EP was then recorded and released by the band in 2012.

=== Animal ===
At the end of 2012 original member Paolo Serafini left the band and the remaining members began work on their 3rd album. During 2013 the four spent many weeks in a small house 100 km south of Berlin referred to by the band as "The house on the hill". It was here they decided not to play anything to anyone until it was finished, writing, recording, producing and mixing everything themselves. During this time they met replacement drummer Jan Siekmann (Formally of German band Bakkushan). In March the band signed a new deal with independent label SPV GmbH. The first single "Human" was released across Europe in May 2014. The album Animal is scheduled for release in autumn 2014.

== Discography ==
=== Albums ===
- Sign Language (Universal Music, 2009)
- Fire to Fire (Universal Music, 2012)
- Animal (2014)

=== EPs ===
- Doorways (live, Manta Ray Music, 2008)
- Wide Asleep (acoustic; Manta Ray Music, 2008)
- Deeper Into the Fire (acoustic, self-released, 2012)

=== Singles ===
- "Don't Stop Now" (Manta Ray Music, 2007)
- "Disease" (Manta Ray Music, 2007)
- "One Good Reason" (Manta Ray Music, 2008)
- "Broken" (Universal Music, 2009)
- "Go" (Universal Music, 2010)
- "Like a Wheel" (Universal Music, 2010)
- "Supernova" (Universal Music, 2012)
- "Human" (SPV Recordings, 2014)
