= Fotos (album) =

Studio album by Fotos
- Released: 29 September 2006
- Recorded: ?
- Genre: Indie Rock
- Length: 35:59
- Label: Virgin Germany

Fotos chronology
Fotos (2006)	Nach dem Goldrausch (2008)

Fotos is the debut album by German indie rock band Fotos, first released in September 2006.

== Track listing ==
1. "Komm Zurück" ("Come Back") – 3:14
2. "So Fremd" ("So Strange") – 3:02
3. "Ich Bin Für Dich Da" ("I Am Here For You") – 3:16
4. "Es Reißt Uns Auseinander" ("It Tears Us Apart") – 3:10
5. "Viele" ("Lots") – 5:01
6. "Giganten" ("Giants") – 4:53
7. "Du Löst Dich Auf" ("You Come Undone") – 2:44
8. "Wiederhole Deinen Rhythmus" ("Repeat Your Rhythm") – 3:02
9. "Glücklich Eigentlich" ("Luckily Actually") – 3:04
10. "Katharina" – 4:33
