= Mistletoe (Colbie Caillat song) =

Single by Colbie Caillat
- Released: November 20, 2007
- Recorded: 2007
- Genre: Pop; holiday
- Length: 3:54
- Label: Universal Republic
- Songwriter(s): Colbie Caillat; Mikal Blue; Stacy Blue
- Producer(s): Mikal Blue

Colbie Caillat singles chronology
"Bubbly" (2007)	"Mistletoe" (2007)	"Realize" (2008)

"Mistletoe" is an original Christmas song written and performed by Colbie Caillat. It was co-written by Caillat's friend and former manager, Stacy Blue, and producer Mikal Blue. "Mistletoe" was released as a standalone single on November 20, 2007. A re-recorded version of the song was included on Caillat's 2012 holiday album, Christmas in the Sand.

== Composition ==
"Mistletoe" was composed in the key of C Major and set to a "moderately slow" tempo of 60 BPM. Caillat's vocals range from G_{3} through C_{5}. The song discusses the experience of spending Christmas time without family or loved ones and represents a "slower paced romantic song" in contrast to the other, generally uptempo, original tracks on Christmas in the Sand.

== Release ==
The original 2007 version of the song was produced by Mikal Blue and released as a digital download single on November 20, 2007. This recording was also included on the 2008 compilation album, The Essential Now That's What I Call Christmas. In 2012, Caillat recorded a new version produced by her father, Ken Caillat, for her holiday album, Christmas in the Sand.

=== In popular culture ===
The song was featured in the 2008 films Baby Mama, and Will You Merry Me?.

== Reception ==
"Mistletoe" debuted at number 86 on the Billboard Hot 100 chart dated December 8, 2007. The song reached a peak position of 75 the following week. "Mistletoe" also peaked at number 7 on the Adult Contemporary chart, marking Caillat's second straight top-10 single on that survey.

In Canada, "Mistletoe" performed slightly better with a debut of 74 on the Canadian Hot 100 chart dated December 8, 2007 and an eventual peak of 56 in January 2008. The song also reached the top 3 of the Canadian Adult Contemporary chart.

USA Today cited "Mistletoe" as the most-downloaded new holiday song of 2007.

== Charts ==
Chart (2007–08)	Peak position
Canada (Canadian Hot 100)	56
Canada AC (Billboard)	3
US Billboard Hot 100	75
US Adult Contemporary (Billboard)	7
