= The Little Things (Colbie Caillat song) =

2008 single by Colbie Caillat

Single by Colbie Caillat

from the album Coco
- B-side: "Magic"
- Released: March 7, 2008
- Length: 3:46 (album version); 3:35 (radio edit)
- Label: Universal Republic
- Songwriters: Colbie Caillat; Jason Reeves
- Producer: Ken Caillat

Colbie Caillat singles chronology
"Realize" (2008)	"The Little Things" (2008)	"Somethin' Special" (Beijing Olympic mix) (2008)

"The Little Things" is the third single from American singer-songwriter Colbie Caillat's 2007 debut studio album, Coco. It was released on March 7, 2008, in Germany, and on October 28, 2008, in the US. It was written by Caillat and Jason Reeves. The single did not chart well in the US, and was her weakest charting single from her album Coco. In 2008, she recorded a French translated version of this song.

== Composition ==
According to the sheet music published at musicnotes.com, "The Little Things" is composed in the key of G major (recorded a half step lower in G-flat major).

== Music video ==
=== European version ===
The video features Colbie Caillat and her love interest towards a man, Troy Dudley, the same man who appears in all of Caillat's videos. The video was for the European market and was shot in San Francisco and is separate from the storyline of the other videos.

=== US version ===
Another music video for the song was shot in Hawaii according to the pictures on her MySpace page. The video is a prequel to "Bubbly" and features Troy Dudley, the same man who has appeared in all of her other videos. In the video, Caillat is shown riding on a bike in Kauai. She bikes past the house of the man she likes while on the way to work. She works at "Bubba Burgers" and ends up seeing him while she is at work. The video then moves to Caillat and her friends swimming at Black Pot beach in Hanalei Bay. The last segment shows her at a party, where she talks with him.

== Track listing ==
US single

1. "The Little Things" (Radio Edit) (C. Caillat, J. Reeves) – 3:35
2. "Magic" (Piano Version) (C. Caillat, J. Reeves) – 3:20

Dutch and German CD single

1. "The Little Things" (Album version) (C. Caillat, J. Reeves) – 3:46
2. "Circles" (C. Caillat) – 3:54

German Maxi single

1. "The Little Things" (Album version) – 3:46
2. "Dreams Collide" – 4:05
3. "Bubbly" (Napster Live Session) – 3:35
4. "The Little Things" (music video)

French iTunes single

1. "Ces petits riens" (C. Caillat, J. Reeves) – 3:46

The Radio Edit shortens the song's intro.

== Charts ==
Weekly chart performance for "The Little Things"
Chart (2008)	Peak position
Austrian Singles Chart	63
German Singles Chart	51
Netherlands (Dutch Top 40)	23
Slovak Airplay Chart	24
US Billboard Bubbling Under Hot 100 Singles	7
US Billboard Adult Pop Songs	16
