= Nach dem Goldrausch =

Nach Dem Goldrausch

Studio album by Fotos
- Released: 28 March 2008
- Recorded: ?
- Genre: Indie Rock
- Length: 36:55
- Label: Virgin Germany

Fotos chronology
| Fotos (2006) | Nach Dem Goldrausch (2008) |

Nach Dem Goldrausch is the second album by German indie rock band Fotos, first released in March 2008 on Virgin Germany.

== Track listing ==
1. "Nach Dem Goldrausch" ("After the Goldrush") – 3:49
2. "Serenaden" ("Serenades") – 3:00
3. "Ein Versprechen" ("A Promise") – 3:46
4. "Ich Häng An Dir Und Du Hängst An Mir" ("I Follow You and You Follow Me") – 2:58
5. "Explodieren" ("Explode") – 4:27
6. "Ein Freak Und Ein Spinner" ("A Freak and a Nutcase") – 4:11
7. "Das Ist Nicht Was Ich Will" ("That Is Not What I Want") – 3:13
8. "Fotos" ("Photos") – 3:53
9. "Essen, Schlafen, Warten Und Spielen"("Eat, Sleep, Wait and Play") – 2:40
10. "Kalifornien" ("California") – 4:58

Some 2008 editions of this album also include the bonus track "Don't Stop 'Til You Get Enough", while a 2009 edition includes the bonus track "Du Fehlst Mir".
