= Fotos =

German indie rock band

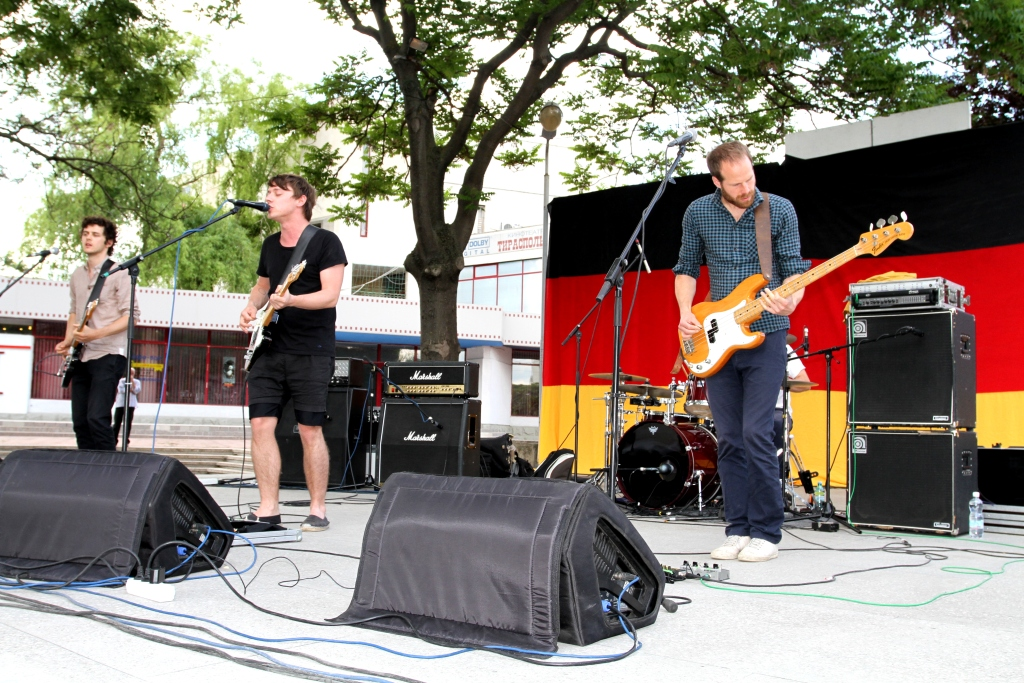
- Fotos performing in Tiraspol, Moldova, (2013).

Background information
- Origin: Hamburg, Cologne, Germany
- Genres: Indie rock, indie pop, dance-punk, noise pop, noise rock, shoegazing, post-punk revival, indietronica, alternative rock, progressive rock
- Years active: 2006–present
- Labels: PIAS Recordings, EMI, Labels, Snowhite
- Members: Thomas Hessler; Deniz Erarslan; Frieder Weiss; Benedikt Schnermann
- Website: www.fotosmusik.de

Fotos are a German indie rock band from Hamburg/Cologne.

== History ==
Fotos' first self-titled album was released through Labels (a Sublabel of EMI) on 29 September 2006. Fotos can be characterised as British-inspired indie rock in connection with German lyrics. In summer 2007, the band played at the German Hurricane Festival and Southside Festival as well as at the Austrian FM4 Frequency Festival. Following the release of their second album Nach dem Goldrausch on 28 March 2008, the band went on tour in Germany and Austria, and played several gigs at festivals in China. They played recently at German music festival organised by Max Mueller Bhavan in Pune, India and also at Delhi Public School Bangalore South where they were opened by the school's rock band "Velocity". In 2008, the band's song "Fotos" was used as a Channel 4 "Try Life in Another Language" advert. In February 2009, Fotos represented the state of Lower Saxony at the Bundesvision Song Contest in Potsdam with their song "Du fehlst mir", ending on position No. 15.

== Discography ==
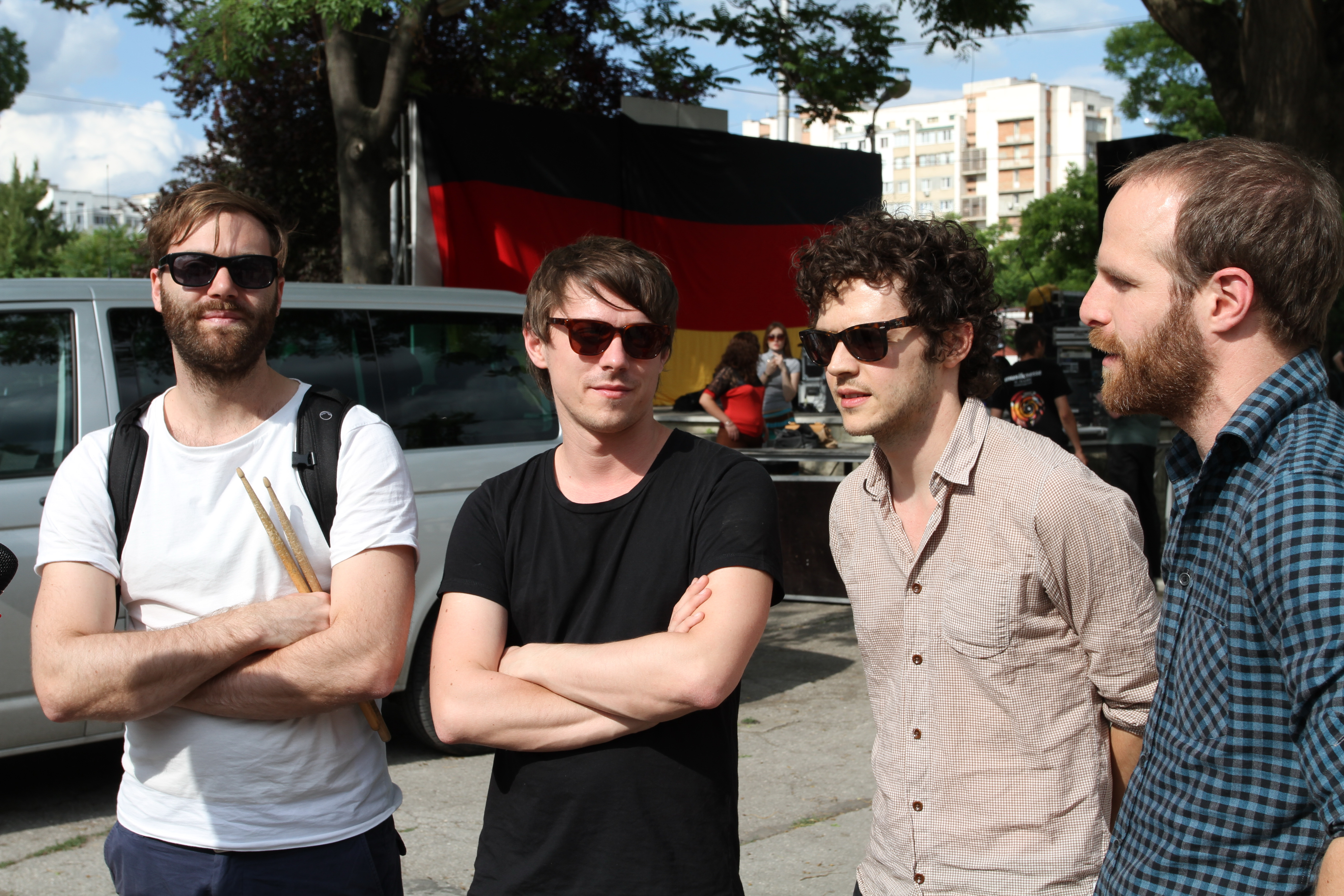
Before the concert in Tiraspol

=== Albums ===
- 2006: Fotos (Labels (EMI)).
- 2008: Nach dem Goldrausch (Labels (EMI)).
- 2010: Porzellan
- 2017: Kids
- 2021: Auf zur Illumination!

=== Videography ===
- Komm zurück (external link: youtube)
- Giganten (external link: youtube)
- Ich bin für dich da (external link: youtube)
- Nach dem Goldrausch (external link: youtube)
- Explodieren (external link: youtube)
