= Bakkushan =

German band

- Origin: Mannheim, Baden-Württemberg, Germany
- Genres: Indie, Alternative Rock
- Years active: 2007–2015
- Label: EMI Virgin Records
- Members: Daniel Schmidt (singer); Robert Kerner (guitar); Christian Kalle (bass); Jan Siekmann (drums)
- Website: bakkushan.de

Bakkushan was a German indie rock band formed in Mannheim. Their band name comes from the Japanese expression バックシャン (bakkushan, a woman that looks better from behind than from the front).

The band was formed in June 2007 by Daniel Schmidt, Christian Kalle, Robert Kerner and Jan Siekmann. In 2008, the band signed to EMI Virgin Records and during that year they won the Jägermeister Rock: Liga Video Contest and Beck’s On Stage Festival Challenge.

In 2010, they represented the state of Baden-Württemberg, in the Bundesvision Song Contest. They finished in 9th place with 39 points.

== History ==
Bakkushan was formed by singer Schmidt together with Kalle, Kerner and Siekmann in July 2007 during their studies at the Popakademie Mannheim. Their first live performance was at the Academy on 28 July 2007. Schmidt developed the band's first EP at home on the computer, to be used as a demo. On the EP were the songs Baby du siehst gut aus, Lass die Sonne und mich allein and the song after which the EP was named, Springwut. The EP was released later in 2007 after the surprise success of the song Springwut. The accompanying music video was made without outside investors.

The first tour with almost 40 concerts was planned and completed successfully in 2008. After winning the Jägermeister Rock:Liga video contest, the band had the opportunity to film a professional music video for the song Springwut. The band also performed at Hurricane Festival 2008 after winning the Beck's On Stage Festival Challenge. After one concert, Bakkushan were offered a contract by a manager from the record label EMI. However they declined, wishing to further hone their sound, contacting the manager six months later to sign to the record label.

Under contract from EMI, Bakkushan began to work on their debut album in Cologne. Daniel Schmidt was joined in production by Moritz Enders, who had previously worked with Donots, Revolverheld, Livingston and Blackmail. The band toured Germany, Austria and Switzerland in early 2009. Their first single, Baby du siehst gut aus was released on 12 July 2009. The single was featured in the film Vortstadtkrokodil 2.

Bakkushan's eponymous debut album, Bakkushan was scheduled to be released on 11 September 2009 but was instead released on 26 March 2010. Two weeks prior, the single Alles war aus Gold had been released. On 16 April 2010, Bakkushan appeared on MTV Home. On the same day they reached number 96 in the German album chart, ahead of releases by Jennifer Rostock and Jupiter Jones. Bakkushan toured again in Germany and Austria throughout the Spring and Summer of 2010.

On 23 July 2010, Bakkushan released their third single Lass die Sonne und mich allein. Bakkushan represented Baden-Württemberg on 1 October 2010 at the Bundesvision Song Contest, playing their fourth single, Springwut, released on 27 September 2010. They reached ninth place with 39 points.

The band announced that they were close to finishing their second album in March 2012 alongside the release of a new single, Böse Mädchen feiern besser. This was followed on 29 June 2012, by Nur die Nacht, which reached number 95 in the German album chart. Two weeks later, on 13 July 2012, the band's sophomore album, Kopf im Sturm was released. The band released another single, Der letzte Mensch der Welt on 26 October 2012, before beginning their Kopf im Sturm tour throughout Germany.

== Discography ==
=== Albums ===
- 2010: Bakkushan
- 2012 : Kopf Im Sturm

=== EPs ===
- 2007: Springwut

=== Singles ===
- 2009: Baby, du siehst gut aus
- 2010: Alles war aus Gold
- 2010: Lass die Sonne und mich allein
- 2010: Springwut
- 2012: Böse Mädchen feiern besser
- 2012: Nur die Nacht
- 2012: Der letzte Mensch der Welt
