= Bubbly =

2007 single by Colbie Caillat

Single by Colbie Caillat

from the album Coco
- B-side: "Circles"; "Magic" (piano version)
- Released: May 15, 2007
- Studio: Revolver Studios (Sherman Oaks, California)
- Genre: Folk-pop
- Length: 3:17
- Label: Universal Republic
- Songwriters: Colbie Caillat; Jason Reeves
- Producer: Mikal Blue

Colbie Caillat singles chronology
"Bubbly" (2007)	"Mistletoe" (2007)

"Bubbly" is the debut single of American singer-songwriter Colbie Caillat from her first album, Coco (2007). Written by Caillat and Jason Reeves and produced by Mikal Blue, the song was released as the album's lead single on May 15, 2007. "Bubbly" is Caillat's only song to peak within the top 10 of the US Billboard Hot 100; it remains her highest-charting song. Internationally, "Bubbly" reached number one in Australia, Brazil, and the Czech Republic. It also became a top-10 hit in several European countries, including Belgium, Germany, and Norway, as well as Japan and New Zealand. It is certified six-times platinum in the US and Australia as well as gold or higher in six additional countries.

The song's music video, directed by Liz Friedlander, aired on MTV, VH1 and CMT. A still from the music video was used as the cover for Caillat's debut album, Coco.

== Background and composition ==
"Bubbly"
A 25-second sample from Colbie Caillat's "Bubbly".

"Bubbly" was written by Colbie Caillat and Jason Reeves. It is written in the key of A and primarily features a gentle guitar instrumentation which uses a capo of seventh fret. The guitar uses open D tuning (low to high): D–A–D–F♯–A–D. Caillat's vocal range spans from E_{3} to F♯_{4}.

Caillat commented on the lyrical composition of the song in an interview with Wilson County News on February 20, 2008, following her live performance on The View, "I didn't write "Bubbly" for any [special] guy. I wrote it about the feelings you get when you have a crush on somebody, and when they give you butterflies in your stomach and they just make you smile."

== Reception ==
=== Critical response ===
Susan Visakowitz of Billboard wrote that Caillat's "warm vocals along with a gentle acoustic arrangement effortlessly conjure the idyllic California she calls home".

=== Commercial performance ===
On the issue dated October 6, 2007, "Bubbly" rose from number 16 to number 10 on the Billboard Hot 100, eventually peaking at number five for seven non-consecutive weeks. It also topped the Adult Contemporary and Adult Top 40 charts for 19 and 14 weeks, respectively. The song was placed at number two on the Adult Contemporary year-end chart of 2008, behind Sara Bareilles' "Love Song". The single was certified six-times platinum by the Recording Industry Association of America on August 18, 2023, with sales of more than 2.6 million downloads in the US. It peaked at number two for three weeks on the Canadian Hot 100. In Australia—where "Bubbly" was used in a promotional video for the Seven Network soap opera Home and Away—it reached number one on the ARIA Singles Chart for the week of April 7, 2008. Elsewhere, the single reached number one in the Czech Republic and charted within the top 10 in Austria, Belgium, Germany, the Netherlands, New Zealand, Norway, Slovakia, and Sweden. It did not fare as well in the British Isles, peaking at number 58 in the United Kingdom and number 48 in Ireland.

On VH1's 100 Greatest Songs of the '00s, "Bubbly" ranked number 71 on the list.

== Music video ==
=== Synopsis ===
"It was just about being by the beach and having a wonderful day with a person you like. It captures that whole feeling."

— Colbie Caillat in an interview with Wilson Country News, describing how the music video for "Bubbly" relates to the overall theme of the song.

Filmed in Colbie Caillat's hometown of Malibu and in Santa Barbara in southern California, the music video features intercut scenes of Caillat playing the guitar while dreamily singing the lyrics of the song and spending time with her lover in their home and out in nature. It is a sunny day, and some shots feature Caillat in fields as she sings. Later in the video, Caillat drives in an old Bronco and then is pictured singing as she walks slowly along the coast of California and looks out over a cliff into the Pacific Ocean. Caillat performs clad in a simple tank top and jeans which are slightly ripped at the knees; she is also barefoot and wearing a necklace made of sea shells.

=== Reception ===
Uploaded to Caillat's YouTube and Vevo account on December 13, 2009, the video for "Bubbly" has received a generally positive reaction from fans and has garnered over 125 million views.

== Track listings ==
- Australian CD single
1. "Bubbly" – 3:17
2. "Circles" – 3:53
3. "Magic" (piano version) – 3:18
4. "Bubbly" (video) – 3:25
- UK CD single
1. "Bubbly" – 3:17
2. "Circles" – 3:53
- European CD single
1. "Bubbly" – 2:53
2. "Magic" (piano version) – 3:18

== Personnel ==
- Colbie Caillat – vocals
- Mikal Blue – acoustic guitar, bass, synthesizer, production, engineering, mixing
- Jaco Caraco – electric guitar
- Victor Indrizzo – drums
- Ken Caillat – mixing
- Doug Sax – mastering

== Charts ==
=== Weekly charts ===
Chart (2007–2008)	Peak position
Australia (ARIA)	1
Austria (Ö3 Austria Top 40)	6
Belgium (Ultratop 50 Flanders)	2
Belgium (Ultratop 50 Wallonia)	9
Brazil (Crowley)	1
Canada Hot 100 (Billboard)	2
Canada AC (Billboard)	1
Canada CHR/Top 40 (Billboard)	7
Canada Hot AC (Billboard)	1
Czech Republic Airplay (ČNS IFPI)	1
Denmark (Tracklisten)	6
Europe (European Hot 100 Singles)	32
French Digital Singles (SNEP)	6
Germany (GfK)	10
Germany Airplay (BVMI)	2
Ireland (IRMA)	48
Japan (Japan Hot 100)	3
Mexico Anglo (Monitor Latino)	1
Netherlands (Dutch Top 40)	5
Netherlands (Single Top 100)	3
New Zealand (Recorded Music NZ)	6
Norway (VG-lista)	2
Poland (Polish Airplay Charts)	5
Portugal Digital Songs (Billboard)	1
Scottish Singles Sales (Official Charts)	49
Slovakia Airplay (ČNS IFPI)	6
Sweden (Sverigetopplistan)	6
Switzerland (Schweizer Hitparade)	11
UK Singles (Official Charts)	58
US Billboard Hot 100	5
US Adult Alternative Airplay (Billboard)	1
US Adult Contemporary (Billboard)	1
US Adult Pop Airplay (Billboard)	1
US Pop Airplay (Billboard)	2
US Pop 100 (Billboard)	2

=== Year-end charts ===
Chart (2007)	Position
Austria (Ö3 Austria Top 40)	65
Brazil (Crowley)	95
Germany (Media Control GfK)	67
New Zealand (RIANZ)	32
Switzerland (Schweizer Hitparade)	64
US Billboard Hot 100	67
US Adult Contemporary (Billboard)	35
US Adult Top 40 (Billboard)	23
US Pop 100 (Billboard)	59

Chart (2008)	Position
Australia (ARIA)	24
Belgium (Ultratop 50 Flanders)	8
Belgium (Ultratop 50 Wallonia)	30
Brazil (Crowley)	46
Canada (Canadian Hot 100)	18
Canada AC (Billboard)	2
French Digital Singles (SNEP)	28
Japan (Japan Hot 100)	57
Netherlands (Dutch Top 40)	6
Netherlands (Single Top 100)	18
Sweden (Sverigetopplistan)	70
Switzerland (Schweizer Hitparade)	77
US Billboard Hot 100	21
US Adult Contemporary (Billboard)	2
US Adult Top 40 (Billboard)	14
US Mainstream Top 40 (Billboard)	37
US Pop 100 (Billboard)	46

=== Decade-end charts ===
Chart (2000–2009)	Position
US Billboard Hot 100	79

=== All-time charts ===
Chart	Position
Dutch Love Songs (Dutch Top 40)	17
US Adult Top 40 (Billboard)	12

== Certifications ==
Region	Certification	Certified units/sales
Australia (ARIA)	6× Platinum	420,000^{‡}
Belgium (BRMA)	Gold	25,000^{*}
Brazil (Pro-Música Brasil)	3× Platinum	180,000^{‡}
Denmark (IFPI Danmark)	Platinum	90,000^{‡}
Germany (BVMI)	Gold	150,000^{‡}
New Zealand (RMNZ)	3× Platinum	90,000^{‡}
United Kingdom (BPI)	Gold	400,000^{‡}
United States (RIAA)	6× Platinum	6,000,000^{‡}
^{*} Sales figures based on certification alone.^{‡} Sales+streaming figures based on certification alone.

== Release history ==
Region	Date	Format	Label	Ref.
United States	May 15, 2007	Digital download	Universal Republic	
United States	June 19, 2007	Contemporary hit radio	Universal Republic	
United States	July 24, 2007	Contemporary hit radio	Universal Republic	
Australia	February 25, 2008	CD	Universal Republic	

== See also ==
- List of Hot Adult Top 40 Tracks number-one singles of 2007
- List of Billboard Adult Contemporary number ones of 2008
- List of number-one singles of 2008 (Australia)
