= Picnic basket =

Covered basket for carrying food and utensils

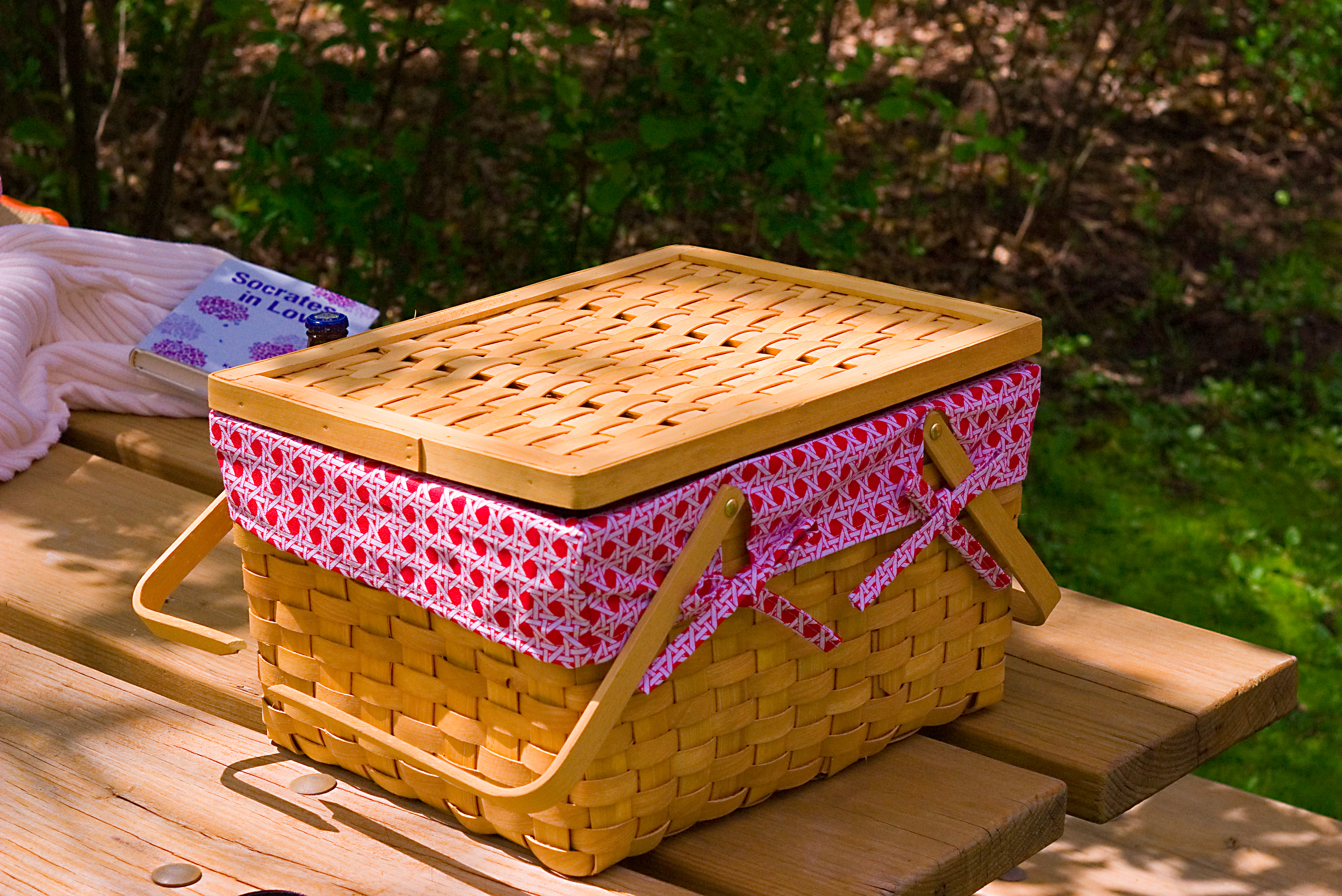
Picnic basket

A picnic basket or picnic hamper is a basket intended to hold food and tableware for a picnic meal. Picnic baskets are standard equipment at many picnics. A traditional picnic hamper is made of woven wicker.

While the basic concept of a picnic basket is quite simple, some picnic baskets sold by gourmet stores are quite large and elaborate, with insulated compartments to hold hot and cold foods, and dishware including wine glasses and porcelain plates which are secured in pockets along with items of cutlery, condiments, corkscrew etc. Many modern picnic baskets also have a special storage section to hold a bottle of wine, the traditional beverage brought along to intimate picnics. Some modern picnic baskets include detachable blankets to sit on.

An innovative picnic hamper advertised for American families in 1953 was designed to clamp over the seat at the back of the family car. The hamper opened with a "built-in midget-size icebox" and slide-out trays "for everyone who wants to eat away from the ants."

Picnic hamper foods usually include pre-prepared sandwiches, pies, fruit, cake, salads and other dishes. A 1917 Australian newspaper article lists items in a picnic hamper for 12 people as: "Ham and mustard sandwiches, tomato and cucumber sandwiches, lettuce and salmon sandwiches, roast fowl, one sponge cake, one currant cake, two dozen scones, one dozen Queen cakes, two dozen lemon cheese tartlets, two dampers, 18 blocks lamington cake, one dozen cream puffs, one dozen custard puffs, 1lb biscuits, 1lb butter, one bottle home-made lemon syrup, one bottle milk, 2lb sugar, 1/4lb tea, four dozen mixed fruit, sweets, one small kettle, six plates, one dozen cups, one jug, one drying cloth, one Billycan, one box matches, four knives, four spoons."

== Etymology ==
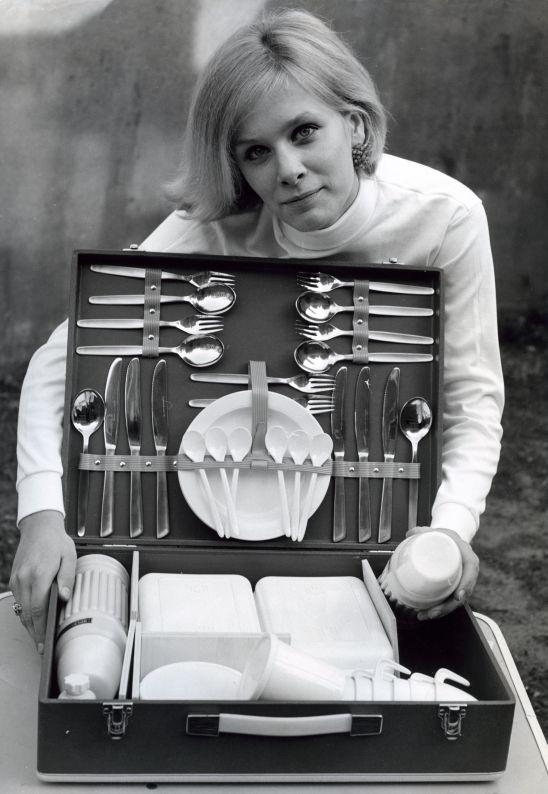
A 1967 picnic hamper in The Netherlands, opened to show straps securing utensils and plates.

Hamper comes from ‘hanapier’, meaning a case for goblets. The concept came from France via William the Conqueror in the 11th century. Portable wicker wine carriers became adopted as travellers’ refreshment baskets, as long journeys often meant overnight stays in coaching inns where palatable food was not always available. Travellers would thus carry better food with them in such baskets or hampers.
