= Body of War: Songs That Inspired an Iraq War Veteran =

Soundtrack album by Various
- Released: March 14, 2008
- Genre: Rock
- Label: Sire

Body of War: Songs That Inspired an Iraq War Veteran is an album produced for the documentary film Body of War, directed by Ellen Spiro and Phil Donahue. Curated by Iraq war veteran Tomas Young, it was released by Sire Records on March 18, 2008, two days before the fifth anniversary of the United States' invasion of Iraq. Body of War was produced by Michele Anthony, Eddie Vedder, Ellen Spiro, Nicole Vanderberg, Michael Goldstone, Holly Adams and Kelly Curtis.

Young personally selected each of the tracks that appear on the album, including Eddie Vedder's previously unreleased, live version of "No More", which was written specifically for the Body of War documentary. It was performed with Ben Harper at Lollapalooza 2007 in Chicago's Grant Park. The double-CD set also features incisive songs from John Lennon, Bruce Springsteen, Bright Eyes, Neil Young, Lupe Fiasco, Serj Tankian and Kimya Dawson.

This music, Young says, serves as his personal "soundtrack for Iraq". "The compilation record was an idea that grew out of my love of music and my reliance on it before, during, and after the war", he says. "The songs I selected for the record were tracks that inspired, motivated, and at times, literally saved me over the past few years".

All proceeds from Body of War, which features original cover art designed and donated by acclaimed political artist Shepard Fairey, go to benefit the non-profit organization Iraq Veterans Against the War (IVAW), as chosen by Young. Founded in 2004 by Iraq war veterans, IVAW's goal is to give voice to the large number of active-duty service people and veterans who are against the war, but are under various pressures to remain silent. In September, Sire Records donated $100,000 to IVAW in the name of Young, who is a spokesperson for the organization.

== Track listing ==
Disc one

1. "Hero's Song" - Brendan James
2. "American Terrorist" - Lupe Fiasco
3. "Light Up Ya Lighter" - Michael Franti & Spearhead
4. "Guerrilla Radio" - Rage Against the Machine
5. "Son of a Bush" - Public Enemy
6. "Empty Walls" - Serj Tankian
7. "Let Them Eat War" - Bad Religion
8. "White People For Peace" - Against Me!
9. "Letter From Iraq" - Bouncing Souls
10. "War" - Dilated Peoples
11. "Overcome (The Recapitulation)" - RX Bandits
12. "Fields of Agony" - No Use for a Name
13. "Bushonomics" - Talib Kweli & Cornel West
14. "The 4th Branch" - Immortal Technique
15. "B.Y.O.B." - System of a Down
16. "No More" (Live) - Eddie Vedder & Ben Harper

Disc two

1. "Devils & Dust" - Bruce Springsteen
2. "Masters of War" (Live) - Pearl Jam
3. "When the President Talks to God" - Bright Eyes
4. "Gimme Some Truth" - John Lennon
5. "The Restless Consumer" - Neil Young
6. "Battle Hymns" - The Nightwatchman
7. "Anthrax" - Kimya Dawson
8. "WMD" - Blow Up Hollywood
9. "State of the Union" - David Ford
10. "Yo George" - Tori Amos
11. "Love Vigilantes" - Laura Cantrell
12. "Black Rain - Ben Harper
13. "To Kill the Child" - Roger Waters
14. "Day After Tomorrow" - Tom Waits
