= Blow Up Hollywood =

American rock band

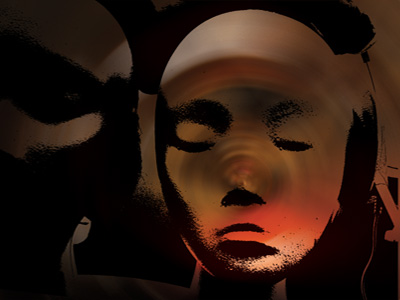
- Blow Up Hollywood

Background information
- Origin: New York, NY
- Genres: Rock, independent, experimental rock, art rock
- Years active: 2001–present
- Past members: Nik Chinboukas; Dave Diamond; Rich Kern; Thad Debrock; Daniel Mintseris; Dave Eggar; Steven Bonacio; Andrew Pfaff; Steve Messina

Blow Up Hollywood is an underground American rock band. Their eclectic sound, built over a decade of recording, incorporates many different styles, diverse as progressive rock, post-rock, experimental, pop, classical, jazz and ambient soundscapes. Founded by Steve Messina and Nik Chinboukas in 2001, the group has evolved into more of a collective than a band, as some of their members have changed over the years.

== History ==
Their debut, self-titled CD, is a concept album about death and the afterlife. The CD was recorded in a beach house in West Hampton, New York, over the course of three weeks in March 2001, and was released the following year. Originally the recording was intended to be just a "musical vacation" amongst friends who had performed and recorded together in various groups and projects throughout the years. But after hearing the results, and enjoying the collaboration, they decided to release it, with Blow Up Hollywood as their moniker.

Their sophomore CD, Fake, was released in 2004, and garnished critical acclaim.

In September 2004, John Diliberto, the host of the radio show Echoes, ran a feature on the band and had them perform live on air, bringing them national attention. That same year their live version of the song "beyond the stars" was included on the Echo's compilation CD, alongside artists Yo-Yo Ma, Kai King, and Will Ackerman.

Stars End - A one track ambient improvisation, was recorded live on November 14, 2004, at WXPN in Philadelphia. The CD is titled after Chuck Van Zyl's show Star's End which has aired every Saturday night since 1976. "We asked Chuck what we should play, and he gave us free reign [sic]. So we improvised for an hour", one of the band members has stated.

In 2006 the band released what would become their most popular CD, both nationally and internationally. With the debate over the war in Iraq raging, the band released another concept album, The Diaries of Private Henry Hill. Based on the journal entries of a young, deceased soldier from the Iraq war, Blow Up Hollywood takes us on Private Henry Hill's surreal journey as he joins the army out of necessity rather than patriotism.

That same year the album was released, Amy Goodman, the host of the news show Democracy Now! (a daily TV/radio news program, airing on over 900 stations, pioneering the largest community media collaboration in the United States) championed the band and the video for the song WMD playing it repeatedly on her show for weeks.

Rachel Maddow, the then host of The Rachel Maddow show on Air America Radio, also invited the band to perform live and discuss the CD. And many other songs from the Diaries record were featured on NPR's program All Things Considered.

In 2008, the band was invited by Tomas Young (an injured American soldier from the Iraq war) and Eddie Vedder (the lead vocalist of the American rock band Pearl Jam) to have WMD included on the compilation soundtrack to the documentary film Body of War, alongside Bruce Springsteen, Neil Young, Tori Amos, Tom Waits, Roger Waters (founding member of Pink Floyd), and Eddie Vedder and Pearl Jam.

Body of War, directed by Ellen Spiro and Phil Donahue, is a 2007 documentary following Tomas Young, an Iraq War veteran paralyzed from a bullet to the spine, on a physical and emotional journey as he adapts to his new body and begins to question the decision to go to war in Iraq.

As Tomas's journey unfolds, the film cuts back and forth to Congressional proceedings in Washington, D.C. Footage includes passionate speeches by Senator Robert Byrd as well as a running tally of how each U.S. Senate member voted on the resolution to authorize President George W. Bush to war in Iraq.

The National Board of Review named Body of War Best Documentary of 2007.

Phil Donahue and Ellen Spiro appeared on Bill Moyers Journal for a one-hour special about Body of War.

== Soundtracks and credits ==
Body of War - The Soundtrack

Body of War: Songs that Inspired an Iraq War Veteran, a double-CD compilation of songs curated by Iraq war veteran Tomas Young, was released by Sire Records on March 18, 2008 — two days before the fifth anniversary of the United States’ invasion of Iraq.

Young personally selected each of the tracks that appear on Body of War: Songs that Inspired an Iraq War Veteran, including Eddie Vedder's previously unreleased, live version of "No More," which was written specifically for the Body of War documentary and performed with Ben Harper at Lollapalooza 2007 in Chicago's Grant Park. The double-CD set also features incisive songs from John Lennon, Bruce Springsteen, Bright Eyes, Neil Young, Lupe Fiasco and Serj Tankian.

The Body of War music site enables visitors to order the Body of War double CD set or buy the iTunes version of the album, view the video for “No More” by Ellen Spiro and special bonus footage with Tomas Young and Eddie Vedder, as well as link to sites and a forum where users can take action based on their feelings about the Iraq war.

All proceeds from Body of War: Songs That Inspired an Iraq War Veteran, which features original cover art designed and donated by acclaimed political artist Shepard Fairey, go to benefit the non-profit organization Iraq Veterans Against the War (IVAW), as chosen by Young. Founded in 2004 by Iraq War Veterans, IVAW's goal is to give voice to the large number of active-duty service people and veterans who are against the war, but are under various pressures to remain silent. In September, Sire Records donated $100,000 to IVAW in the name of Young, who is a spokesperson for the organization.

"Blow Up Hollywood is an intriguing, intelligent progressive pop masterpiece, as good as any you will hear this year or any year." - Jedd Beaudoin

Musician, Singer and Composer Steve Messina goes onlinewithandrea to share the music of his group Blow Up Hollywood. Hosted by Andrea R. Garrison.

=== More film soundtracks ===
- Dreaming of Tibet - 2008
- Mustang - Journey of Transformation - 2009

=== Songs used in television ===
- ABC's 20/20
- CBS' CSI- Miami
- Harley Davidson Commercial

=== Artwork ===
- Rich Kern
- Spencer Gordon - www.spencergordon.com
- Andres Serrano and Brutus Faust

== Band members ==
- Nik Chinboukas – electric and acoustic guitar, keys, bass, vocals
- Dave Diamond – drums, piano, keys, bass
- Rich Kern – electric guitar, piano, keys
- Thad Debrock – electric and acoustic guitar, piano, keys
- Daniel Mintseris – piano, keys
- Dave Eggar - cello, piano
- Steven Bonacio – bass
- Andrew Pfaff – bass
- Steve Messina – vocals, electric and acoustic guitar, piano, bass, keys

== Discography ==
- 2002 - Blow Up Hollywood
- 2004 - Fake
- 2005 - Stars End
- 2006 - The Diaries of Private Henry Hill
- 2008 - Body of War
- 2010 - Take Flight
- 2010 - Brutus Faust (alter ego and band of artist Andres Serrano, Blow Up Hollywood as backup band)
- 2011 - Collections
- 2011 - Live at the Rockwood Music Hall
- 2014 - Blue Sky Blond
