= Kyle Henry =

American film director

- Occupations: Filmmaker, film editor

Kyle Henry is an American independent filmmaker, editor, and educator. Henry teaches film production at Northwestern University in Evanston, Illinois, while also spending time in Los Angeles and Austin.

He received his undergraduate degree from Rice University in art and art history in 1994 and his MFA from University of Texas-Austin in film production in 1999.

== Films ==
Henry's feature narrative debut Room (2005), a mid-life crisis thriller, premiered at Sundance’s Frontier and Cannes’ Directors’ Fortnight sections in 2005. It was nominated for two Independent Spirit Awards, including the John Cassavetes Award for best low-budget narrative, receiving a wide release.

Henry's latest feature Rogers Park (2018), about two interracial couples going through mid-life crisis, is currently 100% Fresh on Rotten Tomatoes and is a NY Times Critics Pick. His Fourplay (2012), an anthology-of-shorts feature comprising four tales of sexual intimacy and transgression. Fourplay has been screened at Outfest in Los Angeles, Sundance, Cannes' Directors' Fortnight, and was a High Jury Commendation at Iris Prize. It went on a US theatrical tour in select cities and has since been released on DVD. In his official director's statement, Henry stated about the film, “All of us want to see aspects of our lives represented so that we know we’re here, so that we know that we’re alive and we know we’re not alone.”

His feature documentaries include University Inc. (1999), about the corporatization of higher education that toured nationwide with funding from filmmakers Richard Linklater and Michael Moore, and American Cowboy (1998), about a gay rodeo champ, which won a regional Student Academy Award. His short N.ew Y.ork C.asino (2002), about Times Square as a consumerist slot machine, won Best Experimental film at South by Southwest and played at museums and gallery spaces worldwide.

He has received several grants from the Texas Filmmakers Production Fund in addition to the numerous festivals his films have played at, in addition to being a United States Artists Fellowship nominee and Rockefeller Media Artist Fellowship nominee.

His next production in development is a biopic about Emily Dickinson. It was accepted into the 2015 Film Independent Fast Track program for development.

== Editing ==
Henry was the editor of the Best Narrative Feature winner at Tribeca and at South by Southwest and Sundance Special Jury Prize for Ensemble Cast, Manito (2001), and nine feature documentaries including the 2012 Emmy Award-winning Where Soldiers Come From (2010), for which he also received, with director Heather Courtney, the Best Documentary Editing Award at SXSW in 2011.

== Filmography ==
=== Director ===
- Rogers Park (2018)
- Half-Life of War (2015)
- Fourplay (2013)
- Room
- N.ew Y.ork C.asino (short - 2002)
- University Inc. (1999)
- Orson Welles Not Taco Bells (Splitscreen segment - 1998)
- American Cowboy (1998)
- Monday Morning (1996)
- Pop Love (1995)

=== Editor ===
- Before You Know It (2013)
- Where Soldiers Come From (2011)
- Trinidad (2008)
- Dream in Doubt (2007)
- Audience of One (2006)
- The Cassidy Kids (2005)
- Letters from the Other Side (2005)
- Troop 1500 (2005)
- Learning to Swallow (2005)
- Are the Kids Alright? (2004)
- Soviet Meditation (2003)
- Manito (2001)
- The Slow Business of Going (2000)
- Togetherless (short - 1999)
