= Freedom Machines =

- Written by: John Haptas; Jamie Stobie
- Directed by: Jamie Stobie
- Narrated by: Peter Dinklage
- Theme music composer: Todd Boekelheide; Evelyn Glennie
- Country of origin: United States
- Original languages: English; Spanish

Production
- Producers: Jamie Stobie; Janet Cole
- Cinematography: Robert Elfstrom
- Editor: Ken Schneider
- Running time: 76 minutes
- Production company: Richard Cox Productions

Original release
- Network: PBS
- Release: September 14, 2004

Freedom Machines is a 2004 PBS/P.O.V. documentary that looks at disability in the age of technology, presenting intimate stories of people ages 8–93, whose talents and independence are being unleashed by access to modern, enabling technologies. Nearly twenty years after the Americans with Disabilities Act of 1990, the film reflects on the gaps between its promise and the realities for our largest minority group – 54,000,000 Americans with disabilities. Whether mainstream tools or inventions such as a stair climbing wheelchair (iBOT), Freedom Machines examines the power of technology to change lives.

== Film content ==
Freedom Machines a public television program and national outreach campaign, looks at our beliefs about disability through the lens of assistive technology. The program explores how human experience and technological innovations are outpacing social policies and the perceptions that have guided them.

In Freedom Machines, viewers will meet a cross-section of America's population a few of the 54 million Americans with disabilities whose lives are being transformed with the help of new technologies. Despite its promise, statistics indicate that fewer than 25% of people with disabilities who could be helped by assistive technology are using it. A 1999 study commissioned by The California Endowment and conducted by the Alliance for Technology Access found that people with disabilities "make do" without vital technology because they are not aware that it is available to them and don't know how to obtain it. Furthermore, the people they most often turn to for information and referrals medical care providers, educators, and community technology centers have inadequate or outdated knowledge themselves. The hardest hit are the poor, those who speak English as a second language, minorities, and the rural poor.

What makes this situation unusual is the existence of tangible solutions and the possibility that they can be widely applied. Freedom Machines weaves together the stories of a group of people in a dozen locations around the United States. It shows what is now possible, what will soon be possible, and why those who could and should benefit are not doing so.

== Synopsis ==
Freedom Machines studies the concept of diversity through the intimate stories of adults and children with disabilities who are using modern technologies to change their lives. Among them are Susanna who is beginning her college career, 38-year-old Floyd Stewart who was paralyzed in mid-life while raising four children; 92-year-old Gladys who is determined to overcome a hearing loss; and high school student Latoya Nesmith who dreams of becoming a translator at the United Nations. Fifteen years after passage of the Americans with Disabilities Act of 1990, Freedom Machines is a reflection on the status of life of America's largest minority group: 54 million people with disabilities.

=== Scenes ===
with running times (min/sec)

- Susanna - Growing Up with Technology (4:24)
- The Movement for Civil Rights (1:37)
- Bonita - Reaching Beyond Expectations (3:01)
- Floyd - The Accident of Disability (2:10)
- Shoshana & Jackie Brand - Breaking Through & Parent Advocacy (4:53)
- Latoya - Public Education & the Law (5:32)
- Gladys - Challenging the Limits of Age (3:05)
- Bonita - Seeking Employment (2:03)
- Floyd - Independence and Public Policy (2:52)
- Funding Assistive Technology (3:00)
- Latoya - A New High School (3:42)
- Susanna - First Day of College (6:39)
- Kent Cullers - A Life in Science (4:23)
- Dean Kamen & Others - Designing An Accessible World (7:12)
- End Credits (2:04)

=== Additional Segments ===
with running times (min/sec)

- Technology for You (6:10)
- Getting the Technology You Need (4:15)
- Your Legal Rights (3:25)
- Designing for Everyone (3:31)

== Nominations and awards ==
- PBS Fall Special on P.O.V.
- Audience Access Award, Superfest XXV
- 2005 Council on Foundations Film Festival
- A.T. Network Outreach Award
- FIRST LEGO League NO LIMITS World Festival
- Americans with Disabilities Act of 1990, 15th Anniversary, Dept. of Commerce, Washington, DC
