= Superfest International Disability Film Festival =

Film festival in California, United States

Coordinates: 37.722302°N 122.481222°W

- Founded: 1970
- Producers: Paul K. Longmore Institute on Disability, LightHouse for the Blind and Visually Impaired
- Language: Primarily English
- Website: superfestfilm.org

Superfest International Disability Film Festival is a juried film festival held in the San Francisco Bay Area. Superfest is the longest-running disability film festival in the world. In addition to featuring films developed by and starring people with disabilities, Superfest aims to be inclusive. The directors also coach the film makers about accessibility of films to people with disabilities. During the film festival, the organizers provide sign language interpreters and film narrators to allow for the attendees with various disabilities to appreciate the films. All of the judges for Superfest are people with disabilities from various community roles, including disability community organizers, disability studies scholars, and film aficionados. Superfest closely follows the disability rights slogan: Nothing About Us Without Us.

Stereotypes of disabilities are perpetuated through mainstream media and popular culture. The aim of Superfest is to showcase films created by people with disabilities, illustrating real life experiences of disability and how universal the topic of disability can be. Some film submissions are what the disability community refers to as inspiration porn. These stories are generally regarding people with disabilities completing a great feat, in spite of their disabilities, and never approach the topic of discrimination of people with disabilities or the social standards to which people with disabilities are held. Attendees express they can be authentic at Superfest and speak openly about their experiences.

Superfest is held over a weekend and is considered more of a cultural event than a film festival.

== History ==
The Superfest International Disability Film Festival began as the Film Forum for the AAMR in the 1970s, and was supported by the University Affiliated Program at Children's Hospital Los Angeles In 1976, it was taken on as a major activity by a newly created non-profit organization, the Corporation on Disability and Telecommunication (CDT). CDT's mission was to promote a positive image of people with disabilities and promote employment for persons with disabilities in the media industry.

At that time, Superfest was the only international film festival that showcased diverse films related to the social challenge of disability, receiving entries from around the country and the world. Viewing committees were established in multiple California locations, often based at the Developmental Disability Regional Centers and eventually at other places around the country. During the late 70s and for most of the 1980s, Superfest screened nearly 100 films a year, produced yearly PBS television viewings throughout the nation, was funded by the Corporation on Public Broadcasting, the State of California, and other groups. During this time, CDT also produced the documentary BREAKING GROUND for KTLA-TV about Hollywood actors with disabilities who were breaking into the mainstream. Both the PBS specials and BREAKING GROUND received Hollywood chapter Emmy nominations for their hosts, along with a 1987 documentary AMNESTY: THE DREAM FULFILLED? about how persons with disabilities were being excluded from becoming citizens. Superfest received special recognition at the Hawaii International Film Festival in 1987 and at the Pacific Film Archives in Berkeley.

The KTLA documentaries received state and national recognition and CDT received various California State grants and awards. By the late 1980s and early 1990s, the leadership of CDT changed, and focus for the running of Superfest shifted to the CDT chapter in the San Francisco Bay area. This was not a surprise in that the first screening committees and PBS airings were in the Bay Area. The first Superfest awards ceremony and screening outside of Los Angeles and AAMR conventions sites, was at the Presidio in San Franciscom, hosted by Jay Leno. In fact, the name for the festival, "Superfest" was first recommended by the "Northern California" organizing committee.

In 1995, CDT decided to move Superfest from Los Angeles to Berkeley. Berkeley is significant to the disability rights movement and independent living.

Annual film festivals were held in Berkeley from 1998 to 2011. In 2009, Superfest held a commemorative two-day program featuring 13 disability films the committee considered classics of disability in film called Superfest Classics.

In 2015 Superfest expanded to a two-day festival and recognized the 25th anniversary of the Americans with Disabilities Act being signed into legislation. With the beginnings as a grass-roots organization, Superfest has not been able to have a film festival each year since its founding. The 2016 festival was their 30th film festival. After the 2019 festival, the LightHouse for the Blind and the Longmore Institute dissolved their partnership, and now the festival is run solely by the Longmore Institute on Disability at San Francisco State University.

== Films shown at Superfest Classics (2009) ==
Film title	Director	Producer	Year initially shown at Superfest
About Love	Tofik Shakhverdiev	Tofik Shakhverdiev	2006
Annie Dearest	Terry Galloway & Diane Wilkins	Diane Wilkins Productions & Mickee Faust Films	2003
Assistive Technology Boogie	Jim Tobias	Jim Tobias	2005
Beyond Disability: the Fefe Stories	Salome Chasnoff	The Empowered Fefes	2005
Disability Culture Rap	Jerry Smith	Jerry Smith & Cheryl Wade	2000
"Hose," "Cards," & "Water Balloons"	Sean Ehringer	Mark Conly	2003
Kiss My Wheels	Miguel Grunstein & Dale Kruzic	Miguel Grunstein & Dale Kruzic	2003
LIEBE PERLA (Dear Perla)	Shahar Rozen	Edna & Elinor Kowarsky, Eden Productions	2004
Pelswick: DRAW	Nelvana		2001
The Power of 504	Dan Veltri		1998
Raymond's Portrait	Donald Young	Donald Young	1999
Wood Diary	David Edwin Meyers	David Edwin Meyers	2006
Youth Speaks segment from KQED's series SPARK	Howard Shack & the Bay Area Video Coalition		2005

== The Dissies ==
In 2013, Superfest presented a special event. This event was to highlight films where disability had been mocked or portrayed in an insensitive manner. These types of films where disability is mocked are referred to as disability snub films. The "Dissies" mirror the Razzies, where the award given is not an honor at all. Each year, a new "Dissie" is awarded from films nominated by the community. Mock "Dissie" awards are given each year to disability snub films.

The Dissies
Worst portrayal of a disability by a nondisabled actor	So sweet (that they're not)
Gene Hackman – Young Frankenstein; Glenn Close – Fatal Attraction; Richard Pryor/Gene Wilder – See No Evil, Hear No Evil	Heidi, Heidi; Mary – The Secret Garden; Pollyanna – Pollyanna
The Most Amazing Miracle	The Most Tragic
Allan Mann, Monkey Shines; Forrest Gump, Forrest Gump; A Blind Girl, City Lights	Million Dollar Baby; Scent of a Woman; Mr. Holland's Opus; The Other Side of the Mountain
The Worst Disabled Villain	Crips Gone Wild!
Dr. Strangelove – Dr. Strangelove; Pew – Treasure Island; Mr. Glass – Unbreakable	Danny – Blind Dating; Carla – The Other Sister; Radio – Radio
Hey – only we can laugh at that!
The Ringer; Tropic Thunder; Waking Ned Devine

== Award winners ==
=== 1998 ===
- Best of Festival – My Country, Producer: Phyllis Ward
- Excellence Award – Disabled Women: Visions & Voices, Producers: Patricia Chadwick and Suzanne C. Levine
- Excellence Award – House Gang: ''Nightmare'', Producer: Gaby Mason
- Excellence Award – Self- Advocacy: Freedom, Equality & Justice for All, Producer: Jerry Smith
- Spirit of Superfest – Disabled Women: Visions & Voices, Producers: Patricia Chadwick and Suzanne C. Levine
- Spirit of Superfest – The Ten Commandments of Communicating with People with Disabilities, Producer: Irene M. Ward & Assoc.
- Achievement Award – BABYARM (God Won?), Producer: Yuri Ukon
- Achievement Award – I Belong Out There, Producer: Irene M. Ward & Assoc.
- Achievement Award – Living Without Limits, Producer: National Multiple Sclerosis Society
- Achievement Award – Loud, Proud & Passionate, Producer: Dana Vion; Mobility International USA, Executive Producer
- Achievement Award – The Paradox Event, Producer: Paradox Arts
- Achievement Award – Vital Signs: Crip Culture Talks Back, Producer: David Mitchell and Sharon Snyder
- Achievement Award – Voices in a Deaf Theater, Producer: Margo Meisel
- Merit Award (Content) – Beyond Access, Producer: The Millay Colony for the Arts and Sharon Greytak
- Merit Award (Content) – Collaborating for Change: Instructional Strategies for All Students, Producer: San Francisco Unified School District, Dept. of Special Ed.
- Merit Award (Content) – In the Groove, Producer: Liane Yasumoto, Jack Walsh, KTOP, and Ceda Floyd, Executive Producers
- Merit Award (Content) – Mickey Spencer, Visual Artist, Producer: LVA: Lesbians in the Visual Arts
- Merit Award (Content) – No Apologies, Producer: Peni Hall; Associate Producer, Pandoura Carpenter
- Merit Award (Content) – The Power of 504, Producer: 504 Sit-in 20th Anniversary Celebration and Commemoration Committee
- Merit Award (Content) – The Ten Commandments of Communicating with People with Disabilities, Producer: Irene M. Ward & Assoc.
- Merit Award (Content) – When Billy Broke His Head...and other tales of wonder, Producer: Billy Golfus and David Simpson
- Merit Award (Technical) – B-Ball: The Team That Never Lost A Game, Producer: Dirk Dirksen
- Merit Award (Technical) – The Chariot Races, Producer: Christian Schneider
- Merit Award (Technical) – EPA Poisons EPA: My Sister's Story, Producer: Therese Svoboda
- Merit Award (Technical) – This is Your Right, Producer: Irene M. Ward & Associates

=== 1999 ===
- Best of Festival – Sunny's Ears, Producer: Gillian Gordon
- Spirit of Superfest – Face First, Producer: Mike Grundmann
- Excellence Award – If I Can't Do It, Producer: Walter Brock
- Excellence Award – Metroland: Big Time, Producer: Atul Malhotra
- Achievement Award – Bay TV LIFE: 1996 Paralympics, Producer: Tim Flannigan
- Achievement Award – Educational Interpreting, Producer: David Conyer
- Achievement Award – Face First, Producer: Mike Grundmann
- Achievement Award – Raymond's Portrait, Producer: Donald Young
- Achievement Award – Recreation for Everyone, Producer: Jonathan Newman
- Achievement Award – Spokesman, Producer: Ethel Louise Armstrong Foundations
- Merit Award – Challenge, Producer: Amy Kaplan
- Merit Award – A Different View, Producer: Lori Power
- Merit Award – Family Challenges, Producer: Leslie Kussmann
- Merit Award – Fred's Story, Producer: Gayle C. Kranz and Eric A. Neudel
- Merit Award – Hope & Solutions for Obsessive Compulsive Disorder, Producer: James Callner
- Merit Award – Laulima: Working Together, Producer: Merrie Carol Grain
- Merit Award – Teach Me To, Producer: Ellen Walters
- Merit Award – This Drawing Looks Intelligent, Producer: M. Baayens
- Merit Award – The Unknown Soldier, Producer: Michele Buck
- Merit Award – The Women's Foundation, Producer: Aarin Burch

=== 2000 ===
- Best of Festival – Disability Culture Rap, Producer: Cheryl Wade, Jerry Smith
- Spirit of Superfest – Disability Culture Rap, Producer: Cheryl Wade, Jerry Smith
- Excellence Award – Good Service Makes Good Sense, Producer: Cathy Crocfer
- Excellence Award – Walk This Way, Producer: Kathryn Vander
- Achievement Award – At the Pub, Producer: Anette and Lars Mullback
- Achievement Award – Click Three Times, Producer: Victoria Sampson; Chantal Marie Grandparent Productions
- Achievement Award – A Few Simple Words, Producer: Jerry Smith
- Merit Award – Words from the Heart: Mentoring, Producer: Disabled Women's Alliance
- Merit Award – Independent Today, Producer: Peter D. Collman
- Merit Award – The Disabling Bullet, Producer: Patrick Devlieger and Miriam Hertz
- Merit Award – Peak Practice - ''Language of the Eye'', Producer: Mervyn Gill-Dougherty
- Merit Award – Danny and the Scotsman, Producer: Peter Nicks

=== 2001 ===
- Best of Festival – Kids Just Want to Have Fun, Producer: David Decker, Mercury Productions, Inc.
- Spirit of Superfest – Parade, Producer: Susan Nussbaum
- Excellence Award – Parade, Producer: Susan Nussbaum
- Excellence Award – Pelswick: DRAW, Producer: Nelvana
- Achievement Award – Body Talk, Producer: Cheryl Marie Wade, Diane Maroger
- Achievement Award – Dissonance, Producer: Mitchell Kezin
- Achievement Award – Peak Practice: Walls of Jericho, Producer: Phil Collinson
- Merit Award – Feeling Space, Producer: Project Ability
- Merit Award – I Keep on Walking, Producer: Anthony Tenczar
- Merit Award – Love is a Hemorrhage, Producer: John R. Killacky
- Merit Award – Sany Dukat: Paralympic Hopeful, Producer: Kati Rooney, Melissa Taylor
- Merit Award – Through Riley's Eyes, Producer: Sue Turner-Cray
- Certificate of Appreciation – ENABLE: People with Disabilities & Computers, Producer: Microsoft – ATG

=== 2002 ===
- Best of Festival – Crip Shots, Producer: John R. Killacky
- Spirit of Superfest – Crip Shots, Producer: John R. Killacky
- Excellence Award – Black Light Dreams: 25 years of the Famous People Players, Producer: Barbara Barde & Stuart Goodman, Take 3 Productions, Inc.
- Excellence Award – Learning to Act in Partnership: Women with Disabilities Speak to Health Professionals, Producer: Dr Carol Gill / Health Resource Center for Women with Disabilities
- Achievement Award – Refrigerator Mothers, Producer: J.J. Hanley, Kartemquin Educational Films
- Achievement Award – Losing It, Producer: Sharon Greytak
- Achievement Award – Explore Your Future - Job Categories, Producor: National Technical Institute for the Deaf
- Merit Award – Still Life Giving, Producer: Nora Arajs
- Merit Award – Our Own Best Advocates: Breast Health for Women with Disabilities, Producers: Jennifer Crescenzo and Betsy Cox
- Merit Award – Travelling, Producer: Shoot Your Mouth Off
- Merit Award – Moving On - Show#1, Producer: Doug Caldwell
- Merit Award – Meet Us Where We Are, Producer: Robyn Mercurio
- Access Award – Visual Music: Expanding on Closed Caption Television, Producer: Gregg A. Brokaw
- Access Award – Meet Us Where We Are, Producer: Robyn Mercurio

=== 2003 ===
- Best of Festival – Born Freak, Producer: Paul Sapin (UK)
- Spirit of Superfest – Annie Dearest, Producer: Terry Galloway & Donna Nudd (USA)
- Spirit of Superfest – Kiss My Wheels, Producers: Dale Kruzic & Miguel Grunstein (USA)
- Excellence Award – Annie Dearest, Producer: Terry Galloway & Donna Nudd (USA)
- Excellence Award – Kiss My Wheels, Producers: Dale Kruzic & Miguel Grunstein (USA)
- Achievement Award – Horizon: The Ecstacy and the Agony, Producer:Jemima Harrison (UK)
- Achievement Award – On a Roll, Producer:Joanne Caputo (USA)
- Achievement Award – We Watch the City, Producer:Jerry Smith (USA)
- Merit Award – A World Without Bodies, Producer: Mitchell & Snyder (USA)
- Merit Award – In Cuba, Disabled, Producer: Victoria Pineda (USA)
- Merit Award – Men on Wheels, Producer: Yahaly Gat (Israel)
- Merit Award – OCD: The War Inside, Producer: National Film Board of Canada (Canada)
- Merit Award – The Perfect Flaw, Producer: Mike Grundmann (USA)
- Outstanding Promotional Media Awards – Dan Commercial, Producer: Cingular Wireless (USA)
- Outstanding Promotional Media Awards – Hose, Cards & Water Balloons, Producer: Mark Conly (USA)

=== 2004 ===
- Best of Festival – Desirability-Julia's Body, Producer: Claire Fisher (UK)
- Excellence Award – Desirability-Wounded Healer, Producer: Claire Fisher (UK)
- Excellence Award – Liebe Perla, Producer: Edna Kowarsky (Israel)
- Achievement Award – Dreaming Awake, Producer: John R. Killacky (USA)
- Achievement Award – Outside / Inside, Producer: Gwen Waltz (USA)
- Achievement Award – Talk To Me, Producer: Vanessa Kaneshiro (USA)
- Merit Award – Bad Hair Life, Producer:Jennifer Raikes (USA)
- Merit Award – Desirability-Vera Cam, Producer: Claire Fisher (USA)
- Merit Award – It's Our London, Producer: Lois Acton (USA)
- Merit Award – Mama Wahunzi, Producer: Lawan Jirasuradej (Thailand)
- Merit Award – Open Futures: People w/ Disabilities at Work, Producer: InfoUse (USA)

=== 2005 ===
- Best of Festival – Happy Birthday Thalidomide, Producer: Kim Flitcroft (UK)
- Best of Festival – Whole- a trinity of being, Producer: Shelley Barry, Mili Bonilla, & Stephanie Garoian (USA)
- Achievement Award – Beyond Disability: the Fefe Stories, Producer: The Empowered Fefes (USA)
- Achievement Award – Fragile X Family, Producer: Eric Kutner (USA)
- Achievement Award – Spit it Out, Producer: Jeff Shames and Jonathan Skurnik (USA)
- Achievement Award – Viviendo de nuevo con dano medular, Producer: Peter Brauer (USA)
- Merit Award – Assistive Technology Boogie, Producer: Jim Tobias (USA)
- Merit Award – Funny You Don't Look Sick, Producer: Susan Abod (USA)
- Merit Award – Night Swimming, Producer: John R. Killacky (USA)
- Merit Award – Self Preservation: The Art of Riva Lehrer, Producer: Sharon Snyder (USA)
- Merit Award – Spark Segment ''Youth Speaks'', Producer: Howard Shack (USA)
- Audience Access Award – Assistive Technology Boogie, Producer: Jim Tobias (USA)
- Audience Access Award – Freedom Machines, Producer: Janet Cole (USA)
- Spirit Award – Beyond Disability: the Fefe Stories, Producer: The Empowered Fefes (USA)

=== 2006 ===
- Best of Festival – Wood Diary, Producer: David Edwin Meyers (USA)
- Excellence Award – About Love, Producer: Tofik Shakhverdiev (Russia)
- Excellence Award – Braindamadj'd...Take II, Producer: Jonathan Finkelstein (Canada)
- Achievement Award – I'm Spazticus, Producers: Jamie O'Leary & Richard Hague (UK)
- Achievement Award – One Strong Arm, Producers: Loren Mendell & Tiller Russell (USA)
- Achievement Award – The Man Who Couldn'd Dance, Producer: Jan Haynes (New Zealand)
- Merit Award – 39 Pounds of Love, Producer: Dani Menkin (USA)
- Merit Award – Abnormally Funny People, Producers: Jane Stephenson & Simon Minty (UK)
- Merit Award – Are the Kids Alright?, Producers: Karen Bernstein & Ellen Spiro (USA)
- Merit Award – Escape Velocity, Producer: Scott Ligon (USA)
- Merit Award – Nectar, Producer: Abigail Davies (UK)
- Spirit Award – Braindamadj'd...Take II, Producer: Jonathan Finkelstein (Canada)
- Pamela K. Walker Award – Equilibrium, Producer: Adrean Mangiardi (USA)
- Emerging Artist Award – The Third Parent, Producer: Christina Frenzel (USA)

=== 2007 ===
- Best of Festival – The Epidemic, Producer: Niels Frandsen (Denmark)
- Excellence Award – No Bigger Than a Minute, Producer: Steven Delano (USA)
- Excellence Award – Outsider: The Life and Art of Judith Scott, Producer: Betsy Bayha (USA)
- Achievement Award – Headstrong: Inside the Hidden World of Dyslexia and ADHD, Producers: Chloe Sladden, Ben Foss, Steve Schecter (USA)
- Achievement Award – Stroke, Producer: Katarina Peters (Germany)
- Achievement Award – The Rest of My Life: Stories of Trauma Survivors, Producer: Gabriel Ledger, M.D. (USA)
- Merit Award – Carmela, Producer: Guillermo Lopez Perez (Mexico)
- Merit Award – Darius Goes West: The Roll of His Life, Producer: Roll With Me Productions (USA)
- Merit Award – Mercury Stole My Fire, Producer: Anitra Nelson (Australia)
- Merit Award – Seeing Is Believing, Producer: Tofik Shakhverdiev (Russia)
- Merit Award – Symphony of Silence, Producer: Yves J. Ma
- Pamela K. Walker Award – Planet of the Blind, Producer: Sven Werner (Luxembourg)
- Emerging Artist Award – Let Us Spell It Out for You, Producer: Joseph Santini (USA)

=== 2008 ===
- Best of Festival – Body & Soul: Diana & Kathy, Producers: Alice Elliott & Simone Pero (USA)
- Excellence Award – Dragon People, Producer: Rosa Rogers (UK)
- Excellence Award – Including Samuel, Producer: Dan Habib (USA)
- Achievement Award – Iron Genrikh, Producer: Alexey Pogrelnoy (Russia)
- Achievement Award – The Miracle, Producer: Jeffrey Jon Smith (USA)
- Achievement Award – Multiple, Producer: Lucinda Broadbent (UK)
- Merit Award – The Collector of Bedford Street, Producer: Alice Elliott (USA)
- Merit Award – Edges of Perception, Producer: Eric Kutner (USA)
- Merit Award – Phoenix Dance, Producer: Karina Epperlein (USA)
- Merit Award – Pushin' Forward, Producer: Izumi Tanaka (USA)
- Merit Award – Slide, Producer: Sharon Katz (Canada)
- Pamela K. Walker Award – Tiresias, Producers: Olimpias Disability Culture Productions (USA)
- Outstanding PSAs/Promo – School Love and Class Photo, Producer: Guzella Nikolaishvili (Russia)
- Outstanding PSAs/Promo – Sins Invalid: Trailer, Producer: Patricia Berne (USA)

=== 2010 ===
- Best of Festival – Like a Butterfly, Director: Ewa Pieta, Producer: Miroslaw Grubek (Poland)
- Excellence Award – When I'm Not Alone, Director & Producer: Rhianon Gutierrez (USA)
- Excellence Award – Children of the Stars, Director: Rob Aspey, Producer: Alexander Haase (USA)
- Achievement Award – Beyond Borders, Director: Brecht Vanmeirhaeghe, Producers: Fabrio Wuytack & Handicum (Belgium)
- Achievement Award – Miya of the Quiet Strength, Director & Producer: Daniel Julien (USA)
- Achievement Award – The Portrait of a Disabled Man, Directors & Producers: Volker Schoenwiese & Bernd Thomas (Austria)
- Merit Award – The Last American Freak Show, Producer & Director: Richard Butchins (UK)
- Merit Award – My Friend Claude (Mon Ami Claude), Director & Producer: Yves Langlois (Canada)
- Merit Award – Wipe Out, Director: Lionel Goddard, Producer: National Film Board of Canada (USA)
- Merit Award – Far From Home, Director & Producer: Elissa Moon (USA)
- Merit Award – The Art of Movement, Director: David Levitt Waxman, Producers: David & Susan Levitt Waxman (USA)
- Pamela K. Walker Award – White Sound, Director & Producer: Sarah Tracton (Australia)
- Emerging – Je me Souviens: Excluded from the Montreal Subway Since 1966, Director & Producer: Laurence Parent (Canada)

=== 2011 ===
- Best of Festival – Flying Anne, Director: Catherine van Campen, Producer: Joost Seelen (Netherlands)
- Excellence Award – The Greatest Show on Earth, Director & Producer: Rosa Rogers (UK)
- Excellence Award – Voices from El-Sayed, Director: Oded Adomi Leshem, Producer: Belfilms (Israel)
- Achievement Award – Drona & Me, Director: Catherine van Campen, Producer: Joost Seelen (Netherlands)
- Achievement Award – Read Me Differently, Director & Producer: Sarah Entine (USA)
- Achievement Award – Stark! Moritz–It'd be Cool if She Became an Angel, Director: Simone Grabs, Producer: Eva Radlicki (Germany)
- Merit Award – Antoine, Director: Laura Bari, Producers: Laura Bari & Mila Aung-Thwin (Canada)
- Merit Award – Crooked Beauty, Director: Ken Paul Rosenthal, Producer: Angel Vasquez (USA)
- Merit Award – Departure Lounge, Director: Louis Neethling, Producers: Louis Neethling & David Horbury (UK)
- Merit Award – Loud, Proud, and Passionate!, Directors: Dana Vion & Sky's the Limit Creative Services, Producers: Susan Sygall & Mobility International U.S.A. (USA)
- Merit Award – Mothersbane Director & Producer: Jason Jakaitis; U.S.
- Pamela K. Walker Award – Rainman Goes to RocKwiz, Director: Russell Kilbey, Producer: Amy Scully (Australia)
- Emerging – Hannah, Director & Producer: Sergio Cruz (UK)

=== 2014 ===
- Best of Festival – The Interviewer, Directors: Genevieve Clay-Smith and R. Bryan (Australia)
- Excellence Award – Vectors of Autism: A Documentary about Laura Nagle, Director: John Schaffer (USA)
- Excellence Award – Once Again, Director: John Spottswood Moore (USA)
- Merit Award – Everything Is Incredible, Director: Tyler Bastian (Honduras)
- Pamela K. Walker Award for Innovation in Craft – The Nature of Pleasure, Director: Thanh Diep (USA)
- Advocacy Award – Restraint and Seclusion: Hear Our Stories, Director: Dan Habib (USA)
- Disabled Filmmaker Award – Krutch, Director: Clark Matthews (USA)

=== 2015 ===
- Best of Festival Feature – Fixed: The Science/Fiction of Human Enhancement, Director: Regan Brashear (USA)
- Best of Festival Short – Bastion, Director: Ray Jacobs (UK)
- Advocacy Award – Do You Dream in Color, Directors: Abby Fuller and Sarah Ivy (USA)
- Disabled Filmmaker Award – Predators of Transylvania, Director: Julia Kolenakova (Slovakia)
- Excellence Award – To Be Or Not To Be, Director: Aziz Zairov (Kazakhstan)
- Achievement Award – Sins Invalid: An Unshamed Claim to Beauty, Director: Patty Berne (USA)
- P.K. Walker Innovation in Craft Award – Regione Caecorum (In the Land of the Blind), Director: Drew Goldsmith (USA)
- Artistry Award – The Gift (of Impermanence), Director: Alex Ketley (USA)
- Disability Comedy Award – Rent-A-Crip, Directors: Terry Galloway and Diane Wilkins (USA)

=== 2016 ===
- Best of Festival Feature – Best and Most Beautiful Things, Directed: Garrett Zevgetis (USA)
- Best of Festival Short – Supersonic, Directed: Samuel Dore (England)
- Advocacy Award – The Right To Be Rescued, Directed: Jordan Melograna (USA)
- Disability Justice Award – Double Discrimination, Director: Rinkoo Barpaga (UK)
- Liane Yasumoto Jury's Choice – Awake, Director: Michael Achtman (UK)

=== 2017 ===
- Best of Festival Feature – Deej, Directed: Rob Rooy (USA)
- Best of Festival Short – In Crystal Skin, Director: Michaela O'Brian (Columbia)
- P.K. Walker Innovation In Craft – The Chili Story, Director: Patty Berne (USA)
- Disability Justice Award – Traveller, Director: Nwaya Zar Che Soa & Pyae Zaw Pgyo (Japan)
- P.K. Walker Innovation In Craft –The Barber of Augusta, Director: Michèle Hozer (Canada)

=== 2018 ===
- Best of Festival Feature – Still Tomorrow, Director: Jian Fan (China)
- Best of Festival Short – Stumped, Director: Ceder Wright & Taylor Keating (USA)
- Disability Justice Award – Who Am I To Stop It, Director: Cheryl Green (USA)
- P.K. Walker Innovation In Craft – Stim, Director: Anna KJ Maguire (USA)

=== 2019 ===
- Best of Festival Feature – Chuskit, Director: Priya Ramasubban (India)
- Best of Festival Short – Gaslit, Director: Naomi Chainey (Australia)
- Juror's Choice – The Gallery, Director Anthony Ing (UK)
- Advocacy Award – The Man of the Trees, Director: Andrea Trivero (Italy/Burkina Faso)
- P.K. Walker Innovation In Craft – Chin Up, Director: Georgina Hurcombe (UK)

=== 2020 ===
- Garden Variety—Director: Reid Davenport
- Verisimilitude—Director: David Proud
- High Flying Jade—Director: Katherine Sweetman
- My Grito—Director: Cristian Rosas
- The Sound of a Wild Snail Eating—Director: Elizabeth Tova Bailey
- Sign at All Times—Director: Andrew Leibman
- Indimenticabile—Director: Gianluca Santoni
- The Secret Life of Tom Lightfoot—Director: Ray Jacobs
- Single—Director: Ashley Eakin
- ReAct—Directors: Takahiro Sato, Nobuyuki Arai
- Wheelchair Wendy—Director: Shaina Ghuraya
- Sweet Solace—Director: Nicolas Durand
- Stand Up—Directors: Kitty Hu, Dasha Masalitina
- Alternative Ways of Being Human—Director: Jenni-Juulia Wallinheimo-Heirmonen
- God Given Talent—Director: Jeff M. Giordano

== Directors ==
Pamela Walker led the film festival efforts from 1998 to 2001, after which, Liane Yasumoto took over operations. Catherine Kudlick, the director of the Paul K. Longmore Institute on Disability at San Francisco State University, and Bryan Bashin, CEO of LightHouse for the Blind and Visually Impaired, joined to direct Superfest starting in 2012.

Since 2012, when the Longmore Institute on Disability and LightHouse for the Blind and Visually Impaired have directed Superfest, there has been a film festival each year, and the festivals have sold out each time.

== Growth of the festival ==
Superfest now attracts over 300 attendees during the festival's two-day event. Filmmakers from both beginning and established backgrounds showcase their projects at Superfest. Filmmakers have debuted their films at Superfest and then gone on to receive broader distribution opportunities and further success. The film creators have expressed having Superfest as an opportunity to showcase their work is affirming.

In 2016, there were 119 film submissions for Superfest.
