= Atomic Ed and the Black Hole =

2001 film by Ellen Spiro

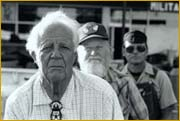
- Directed by: Ellen Spiro
- Produced by: Ellen Spiro; Karen Bernstein
- Cinematography: Ellen Spiro
- Edited by: Karen Skloss
- Distributed by: HBO/Cinemax Documentary
- Release date: 2001
- Running time: 40 minutes

Atomic Ed and the Black Hole is a documentary released in 2001 by filmmaker, Ellen Spiro. The documentary was made for HBO's Cinemax Reel Life Series. Sheila Nevins served as Executive Producer and Lisa Heller served as Supervising Producer. Karen Bernstein served as Producer. Laurie Anderson provided her song, Big Science, for the soundtrack.

Ed Grothus (“Atomic Ed”) is a machinist-turned-atomic junk collector who more than 30 years ago quit his job of making atomic bombs and began collecting non-radioactive nuclear waste discarded from the Los Alamos National Laboratory.

Atomic Ed is the proprietor of “The Black Hole”, a second-hand shop and, next door, curator of the unofficial museum of the nuclear age. His collection reveals and preserves the history of government waste that was literally thrown in a trash heap.

== Awards and festival screenings ==
- Best Documentary Short, South by Southwest Film Festival, 2001
- Audience Award and Judges Competition First Place Award, Alibi Short Film Fiesta, Albuquerque, 2001
- Melbourne International Film Festival, 2001
- Hot Springs International Film Festival, 2001
- Peace and Justice Filmmaker's Award, 2001
- San Francisco Documentary Festival, 2001
- SITE Santa Fe, 2001.

== Articles ==
- Halleck, Deedee. Hand Held Visions: Atomic Ed and the Black Hole. 2007-4-12. Retrieved on 2007-6-20.
- MacDonald, Scott. Pioneering Spirit: An Interview with Ellen Spiro. Public Culture Duke University Press. 14.3 (2002) 469-475. Retrieved on 2007-6-25.

== See also ==
- List of films about nuclear issues
- List of books about nuclear issues
