= Room (2005 film) =

- Directed by: Kyle Henry
- Written by: Kyle Henry
- Starring: Cyndi Williams
- Release date: September 2, 2005
- Running time: 83 minutes
- Language: English

Room is a 2005 independent drama film written and directed by Kyle Henry and starring Cyndi Williams. The screenplay concerns a woman who abandons her family to follow a vision.

== Premise ==
An overworked, middle-aged Texas woman embezzles from her employer and abandons her family to seek out a mysterious room that has been appearing to her in visions during seizure-like attacks.

== Reception ==
The film holds an approval rating of 69% on Rotten Tomatoes.
