= Body of War =

- Directed by: Ellen Spiro and Phil Donahue
- Produced by: Ellen Spiro and Phil Donahue
- Starring: Tomas Young
- Cinematography: Ellen Spiro
- Edited by: Bernadine Colish
- Music by: Eddie Vedder
- Distributed by: Film Sales Company
- Release date: September 2007 (Toronto)
- Running time: 87 minutes
- Country: United States
- Language: English

Body of War is a 2007 documentary film about Iraq War veteran Tomas Young. Bill Moyers Journal featured a one-hour special about Body of War including interviews with filmmakers Ellen Spiro and Phil Donahue.

== Summary ==
Shocked by the September 11 attacks Tomas Young wants to defend his country and subsequently he joins the United States Armed Forces. Following his enlistment, he is sent to Iraq but shortly after his arrival there he is maimed by a marksman's bullet. Intercut with his personal story is footage from Congressional proceedings in Washington, D.C. which led to the controversial war.

== Accolades ==
- Shortlisted for an Oscar nomination by the Academy of Motion Picture Arts and Sciences.
- Best Documentary (National Board of Review of Motion Pictures)
- People's Choice Award at the Toronto International Film Festival.
- Audience Award for Best Documentary at the Hamptons International Film Festival.

== Critical reception ==
Time assessed the documentary as "superb" and "very moving". The Washington Post considered the documentary well-told, upsetting and "ferocious". The Hollywood Reporter certified "Body of War" as special among other antiwar documentaries for its "identification" with one particular human fate. Moving Pictures agreed the film "secures its strength" by that. The Los Angeles Times described this narrative as a "heartbreaking account" and moreover spoke of a strong indictment of "the tactical politics that led to the invasion". The Boston Globe and The Kansas City Star also called it "heartbreaking". The Toronto Star appreciated protagonist Tomas Young as a "fascinating, charismatic character". The Philadelphia Inquirer stated Young's filmic portrait was a "complex profile in courage". The Austin Chronicle said "Body of War" was "affecting" and a "cinematic argument against the war", and TV Guide described it as a "powerful film".

== Media coverage ==
- Moyers, Bill. Bill Moyers Journal . BODY OF WAR | PBS pbs.org/moyers 2008-03-21. Retrieved on 2008-3-29.
- Zeitchik, Steven. Donahue's 'Body' Builds Buzz: Talkshow Icon's Documentary Sparks Interest. Variety. 2007-7-8. Retrieved on 2007-7-12.
- Goodman, Amy. 'Democracy Now' interview with Phil Donahue and Ellen Spiro Democracy Now. 2008-3-25.
- Gillette, Felix. Phil Donahue Strikes Back. The New York Observer. 2007-6-19. Retrieved on 2007-6-25.
- Donahue, Phil. Body of War. The Huffington Post. 2007-6-17. Retrieved on 2007-6-25.
- Kluger, Bruce. Films No Longer Wait for History. USA Today. 2007-10-31.
- Friedman, Roger. Phil Donahue Makes Anti-War Film. FoxNews.com. 2006-11-27. Retrieved on 2007-6-25.
- Celizic, Mike. Phil Donahue Unveils Documentary on Wounded GI Today. MSNBC.com. 2008-4-1.
- "Next on Phil Donahue: Body of War". New York Daily News. April 5, 2008. Archived from the original on April 10, 2008.
- Silverman, Jason (February 21, 2008). "Donahue Tackles Iraq in Body of War". Wired.
- Niles Folsom, Chandra. So What Do You Do, Phil Donahue? MediaBistro.com. 2007-6-6. Retrieved on 2007-6-25.
- Powers, Ann. A War Vet's Unlikely Seat in the Spotlight Los Angeles Times. 2008-4-20.
- Newman, Laura. Interview: Ellen Spiro (co-director for Body of War) Ioncinema.com. 2008-4-18.
- Priesmeyer, Molly. Tomas Young of Body of War Continues his Fight. Minnesota Monitor. 2008-5-16.
- Frehsee, Nicole. Body of War Hero Talks Eddie Vedder, SXSW Premiere Rolling Stone. 2008-3-6.

== Soundtrack ==
The double-CD compilation of songs curated by Iraq war veteran Tomas Young, was released by Sire Records on March 18, 2008 — two days before the fifth anniversary of the United States' invasion of Iraq. A Body of War music site was created to provide special features and related links.

=== Track listing ===
==== Disc one ====
1. Brendan James – "Hero's Song"
2. Lupe Fiasco – "American Terrorist" (Fiasco, Prolyfic, Armando Corea) – 4:40
3. Michael Franti & Spearhead – "Light Up Ya Lighter" (Franti, Itiene) – 4:57
4. Rage Against the Machine – "Guerrilla Radio" – 3:26
5. Public Enemy – "Son of a Bush" – 5:52
6. Serj Tankian – "Empty Walls" (Tankian) – 3:49
7. Bad Religion – "Let Them Eat War" (Brian Baker, Jay Bentley, Sage Francis, Brett Gurewitz, Brooks Wackerman) – 2:57
8. Against Me! – "White People for Peace" (Laura Jane Grace) – 3:33
9. The Bouncing Souls – "Letter from Iraq" (The Bouncing Souls, Garett Reppenhagen) – 2:57
10. Dilated Peoples – "War" (Questlove)
11. Rx Bandits – "Overcome (The Recapitulation)" – 3:46
12. No Use for a Name – "Fields of Agony" – 2:24
13. Talib Kweli & Cornel West – "Bushonomics"
14. Immortal Technique – "The 4th Branch" – 5:20
15. System of a Down – "B.Y.O.B." (Daron Malakian, Casey Chaos, Serj Tankian) – 4:17
16. Eddie Vedder & Ben Harper – "No More" [Live]

==== Disc two ====
1. Bruce Springsteen – "Devils & Dust" (Springsteen) – 4:58
2. Pearl Jam – "Masters of War" [Live] (Bob Dylan)
3. Bright Eyes – "When the President Talks to God" (Conor Oberst) – 2:46
4. John Lennon – "Gimme Some Truth" (Lennon) – 3:16
5. Neil Young – "The Restless Consumer"
6. The Nightwatchman – "Battle Hymns"
7. Kimya Dawson – "Anthrax"
8. Blow Up Hollywood – "WMD"
9. David Ford – "State of the Union" (Ford)
10. Tori Amos – "Yo George" (Amos) – 1:25
11. Laura Cantrell – "Love Vigilantes"
12. Ben Harper – "Black Rain" (Ben Harper/Jason Yates)
13. Roger Waters – "To Kill the Child"
14. Tom Waits – "Day After Tomorrow" (Kathleen Brennan, Waits)
