= DiAna DiAna =

American hairdresser and HIV/AIDS activist

DiAna DiAna is an American hairdresser and HIV/AIDS activist from Columbia, South Carolina. Her work in the field of HIV/AIDS and basic sex education was featured in the 1989 documentary film Diana's Hair Ego.

== Career ==
Troubled about the lack of sex education and HIV prevention within African-American communities, DiAna began distributing condoms free of charge from her salon. When she noticed that the women were reluctant to carry these condoms home with them, she "decided to wrap the condoms up in gift wrap as a means of destigmatizing the process." DiAna's efforts soon began to be recognized outside of her network of clients. She gave presentations to church groups, in local elementary schools, and engaged high school students to become community leaders. DiAna's activism was instrumental in the development of beauty locations as sites of HIV outreach and education across the United States.

=== South Carolina AIDS Education Network ===
DiAna founded the South Carolina AIDS Education Network (SCAEN) with Dr. Bambi Gaddist (née Sumpter) in 1987. Working out of DiAna's hair salon, the two women organized film screenings on the topic of HIV/AIDS, safer-sex presentations, "Tupperware"-style sex toy parties, and free condom distribution. SCAEN has been praised for its "creative strategies and nonjudgmental concern" in its grassroots campaign against the spread of HIV. The group estimates that it has provided one-to-one information on HIV to over 9,000 people in South Carolina. In addition to face-to-face activism, DiAna, Bambi, and other volunteers for SCAEN created informational videos, music, pamphlets, and colouring books to distribute statewide, accessible to children and adults with low or little reading ability.
