= Greetings from Out Here =

- Directed by: Ellen Spiro
- Produced by: Ellen Spiro; Kate Horsfield
- Cinematography: Ellen Spiro
- Release date: 1993
- Running time: 58 minutes
- Country: United States
- Language: English

Greetings from Out Here is a 1993 road trip documentary film by Ellen Spiro, which captures the people, places and politics of gay America in the Deep South.

It was the first Independent Television Service (ITVS) program broadcast nationally. It received an invitation to the Sundance Film Festival and was acquired for international broadcasts by the BBC, Channel Four, and the Canadian Broadcasting Company.

== Synopsis ==
On her journey, filmmaker Ellen Spiro visits notable landmarks, events, and characters, including Mardi Gras, Gay Pride in Atlanta, the Gay rodeo, Dollywood, Miss Miller's Eternal Love and Care Pet Cemetery, and the Short Mountain Radical Faerie sanctuary.

Interviews with gay men and lesbians throughout the film demonstrate the wide range of Southern lives, from Rita, a retired military officer, now a drag queen in New Orleans, to Iris, a black lesbian living in a bus in the Ozarks.

The subjects in Greetings From Out Here address the impact of AIDS in the rural South, the politics of being gay in the South, and the relationship between the gay and civil rights movements.

== Reviews ==
"A wise-cracking, determinedly anti-mythic video artist with a gift for finding community wherever she turns, Spiro defines the roadmovie on her own terms in an exhilarating new work. Her curious, wry, observant, and admirably uninvasive way of shooting conveys a vital feeling of identification with her subjects."
– Linda Dubler, Video Curator, High Museum of Art, Atlanta

"Lacing the work with irony, humor, and defiance, and a touch of pain and bitterness, [Spiro] ties together isolated people through their common identity and a strong sense of place that ranks this among the finest road documentaries and ethnographic films." – Rob Nixon, ETC. MAGAZINE

== Awards ==
- Documentary Achievement Award, American Motion Picture Society (1995)
- Jury Award, New York Expo of Film and Video (1995)
- First Prize, Non-fiction, USA Film Festival (1994)
- Golden Gate Award, Best Television Documentary, San Francisco International Film Festival (1994)
- Best Documentary Award, Atlanta Film and Video Festival (1994)
- Paul Clere Humanitarian Award of Excellence, Sinking Creek Film Festival (1994)
- Central Florida Film and Video Festival 3rd Place (1994)
- Best of Festival Award, New England Film and Video Festival (1994)
- Grand Prize, Chicago International Gay Film and Video Festival (1994)
