= Ed Grothus =

American machinist and technician

Edward Bernard Grothus
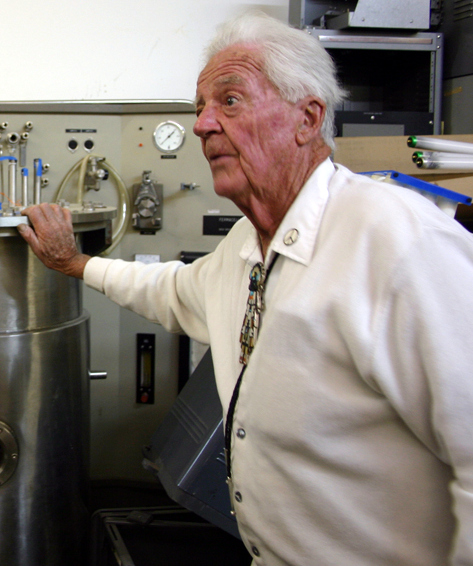
- Ed Grothus, November 2007
- Born: June 28, 1923; Clinton, Iowa
- Died: February 12, 2009 (aged 85); Los Alamos, New Mexico
- Known for: Political Activism, Anti-Nuclear Activism, Pro-Solar
- Scientific career
- Workplaces: Los Alamos National Laboratory

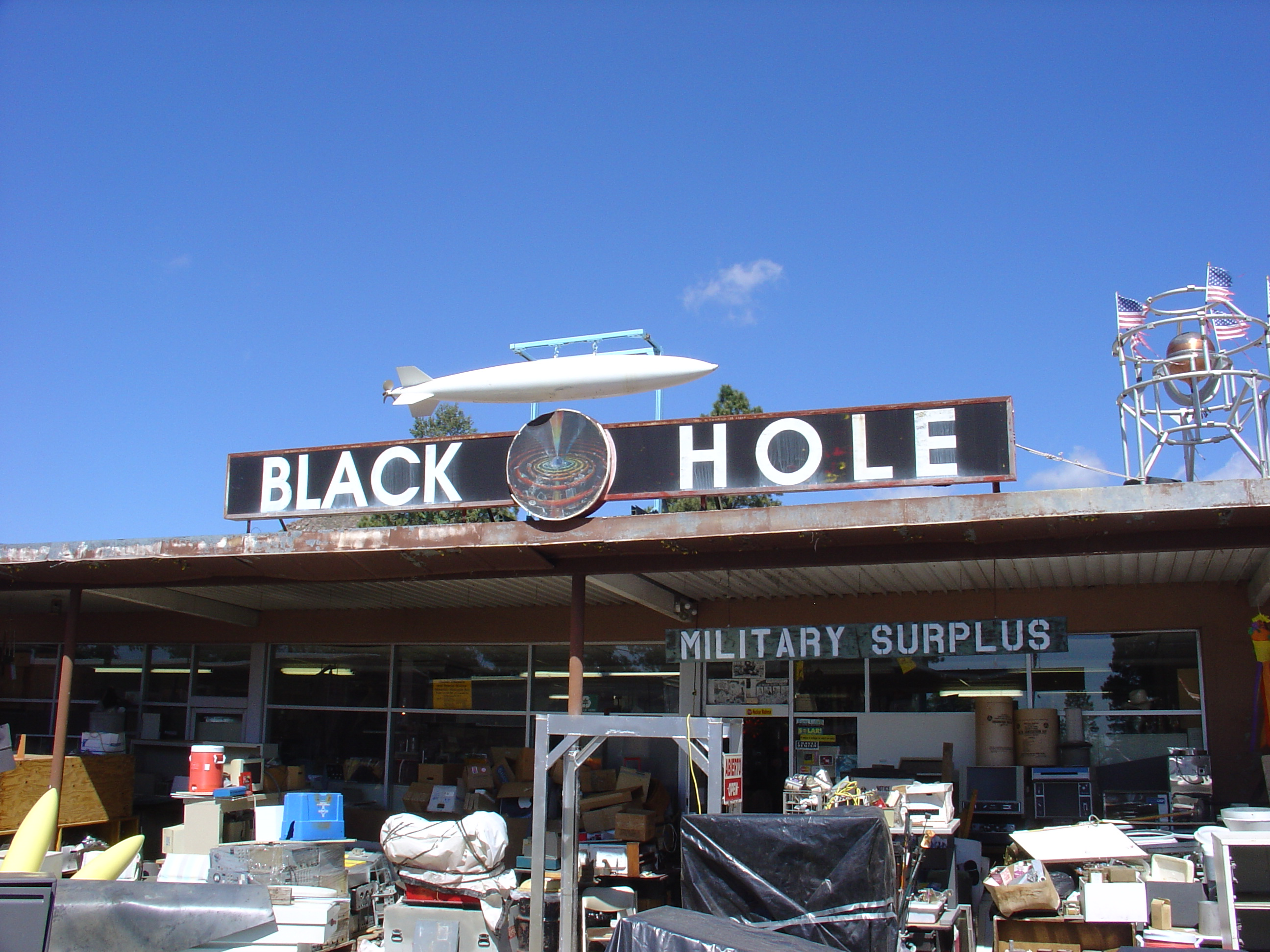
The Black Hole, 2009

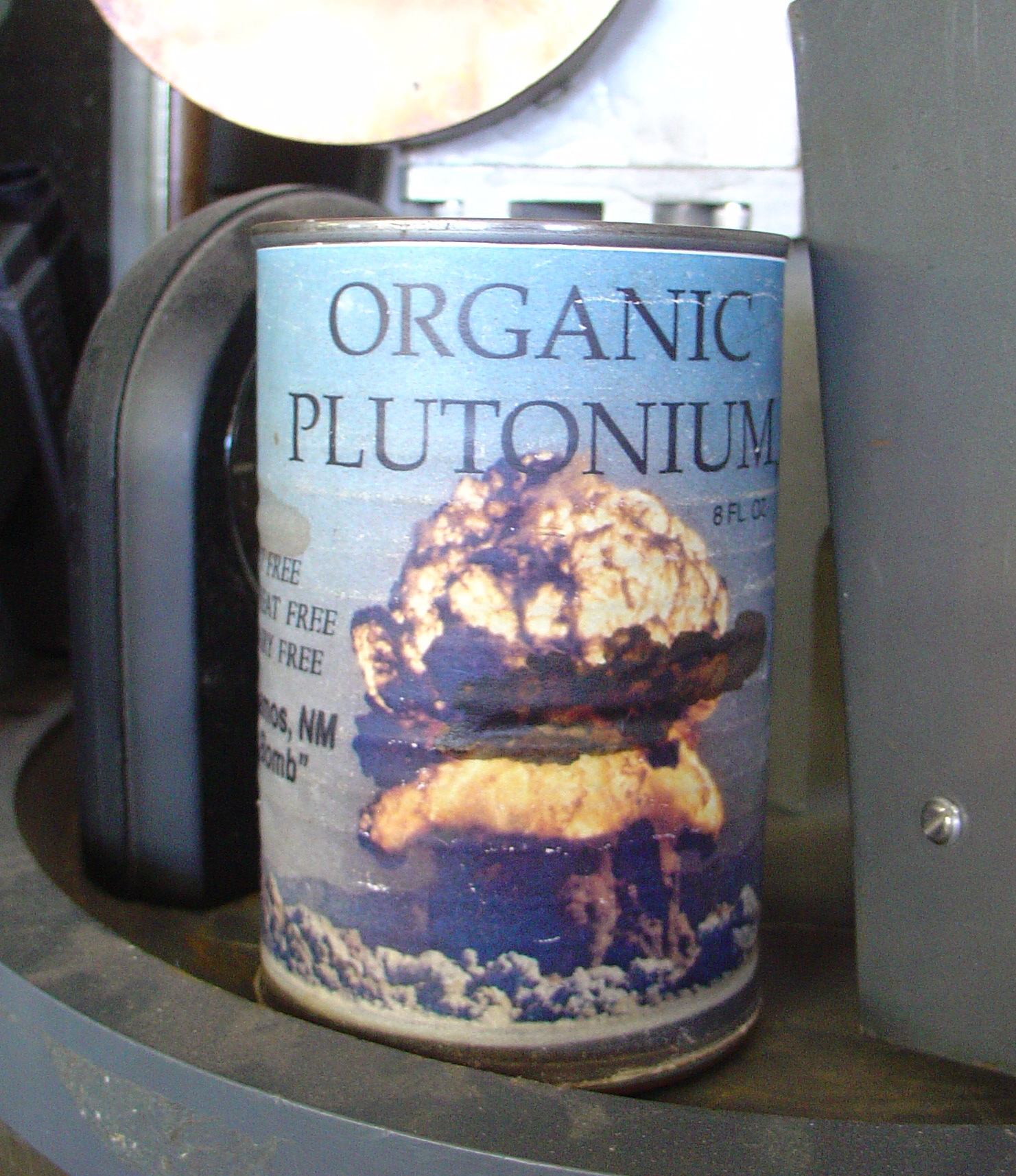

Edward "Atomic Ed" Bernard Grothus (June 28, 1923 – February 12, 2009) was an American machinist and technician at the Los Alamos National Laboratory during the 1950s and 1960s. In later life he became the owner of a surplus store which he used as a base for peace and anti-nuclear activism.

== Weapons specialist ==
Originally, Grothus built rifles and machine guns at the Rock Island Arsenal in Illinois.

He arrived in Los Alamos on March 23, 1949. Initially, Grothus worked for 2 years as a machinist and then 18 years as a technician in the R-Site weapons development group. This involved working with depleted uranium and taking measurements for studies on the hydrodynamics of test implosions.

He said his work contributed to the creation of bombs 30 times smaller and 30 times more powerful than those used on Hiroshima and Nagasaki—an increase from 15 kilotons to 475 kilotons in a nuclear package the size of a bowling ball.

On December 1, 1969, Grothus quit the lab to pursue his business and activism interests full-time.

== Shopkeeper and peace activist ==
In 1951, while still working at the lab, Grothus founded the Los Alamos Sales Company, known to all as "The Black Hole" (because "everything goes in and nothing comes out"). It was a "thrift shop" of old scientific equipment that he had collected from the National Laboratory over the past decades. Ed could be seen often shopping at another Los Alamos thrift shop, Casa Mesita.

Originally, the business had no permanent home as Grothus sold unwanted lab items purchased at auction to universities and researchers. In 1976 the store found its home in a 17,000-square-foot (1,600 m^{2}) converted Piggly Wiggly grocery store Grothus and his wife Margaret purchased. His objective for the Black Hole was to recycle scientific equipment for use in peaceful endeavors and to serve as a base to campaign for nuclear disarmament. Grothus predicted that there would be a nuclear holocaust in 2013.

For a while Grothus sold cans of supposed "organic plutonium", affixing mushroom cloud wrappers to cans of soup. He mailed a free sample to the White House, earning him a visit from the Secret Service.

When walking into the gymnasium sized warehouse filled with piles of old computers, function generators, lock in amplifiers, microscopes and piles of wires and cables, a sign on the door read:

One bomb is too many
No one is secure unless everyone is secure
Don't throw anything away
Welcome to The Black Hole

The Black Hole closed permanently in 2017.

== Documentary films ==
Grothus is the subject of three documentaries. The first, Atomic Ed and the Black Hole was produced in 2002 and broadcast in the United States on HBO. The second, focusing on Los Alamos as a whole, was a German production called Los Alamos und die Erben Der Bombe. The third, Laboratory Conditions, is a short film available for free on the internet.

Visitors to The Black Hole have captured video content and added it to places like YouTube.

Ed also has two large granite obelisks to document the development of atomic bombs.

== Publications ==
In 2019 Atomic Ed was published by documentary photographer Janire Nájera. The book includes archival documents, past and recent photographs and a selection of letters from over 50 years of correspondence between Ed Grothus and politicians, scientists, the media and his family. Barcelona: RM Editorial, 2019. ISBN 9788417047610. With a foreword by Celia Jackson.

== Awards ==
Grothus has received a number of awards and other recognition including:

2006 Nuclear Free Future Lifetime Achievement for his ongoing activism speaking out against nuclear weapons and nuclear power - where the risks and decommissioning costs are significant.

2006 Indigenous World Uranium Summit, Lifetime Achievement for promoting a nuclear-free future through his work.

2007 Allan Hauser Memorial Award. for his demonstrated artistic success and community involvement.

Mike Daisey - If You See Something Say Something. where Mike Daisey talks about his visits to Trinity Site, The Bradbury Science Museum and his "Welcome to the Black Hole".

National Public Radio (NPR) feature titled "At 85, 'Atomic Ed' Is Still Ticking Off Los Alamos" which described Ed's ongoing buying, selling and saving of "nuclear waste" and his desire to find a location for his twin 40 ton granite monuments - the Rosetta Stones for the Nuclear Age.

== Death ==
Grothus died on February 12, 2009, from colon cancer.

In an email correspondence prior to his death, Ed wrote, "My body is wracked with cancer tumors. My mind is wracked with the horrible visions of a very possible nuclear holocaust."

== See also ==
- Thomas
