= 10 Under 10 Film Festival =

Film festival

The 10 Under 10 Film Festival was created by independent documentary filmmaker and University of Texas at Austin Professor Ellen Spiro. The intention of the film festival is to encourage raw creativity among new filmmakers without relying on huge budgets.

Since 2002, the film festival has showcased short, high-quality, low-budget documentaries "founded on the notion that great ideas can happen on no budget and in little time". As a film professor, Spiro says that she has watched too many students get caught in the romance of film school debt and challenges filmmakers to make films with "little money but lots of substance and inventiveness".

The name expresses the informal desire to show ten films, each less than ten minutes long, costing less than $10 to make.

== See also ==
- 168 Hour Film Project
