= Richard Butchins =

British filmmaker

Richard Butchins is a British filmmaker, artist and writer. He has worked as presenter and director of arts and current affairs documentaries, and as an investigative filmmaker, for television programmes such as BBC One's Panorama, Channel 4's Dispatches and ITV's Exposure. Having had an arm paralysed by polio as a child, and through also being neuro-diverse Butchins "uses his own experience as a disabled person to make work which addresses disability".

His controversial and independently made, The Last American Freak Show won the 2010 Merit Award at the Superfest International Disability Film Festival and the Best Director Award at the Moscow Breaking Barriers festival. His collaboration with four non-verbal autistic artists in Osaka Japan, The Voice of the Unicorn won the 2018 Sheffield Doc/Fest Alternate Realities Interactive Award. In 2022 he won a British Journalism Award and SCOPE disability Journalist of the year

== Filmography ==
- The Last American Freakshow (More4, 2008) – produced and directed by Butchins
- Britain on the Sick (Channel 4, 2012) – Dispatches
- NHS Out of Hours Undercover (ITV, 2015) – Exposure
- Nursing Homes Undercover (BBC One, 2016) – Panorama
- The Great Benefits Row Dispatches (Channel 4, 2016)
- The Voice of the Unicorn (2018) – a multi-disciplinary collaboration between Butchins, Kazuyo Morita, Yasuyuki Ueno, Mami Yoshikawa and Koji Nishioka.
- Witness Intimidation Revealed: Stitches for Snitches (Channel 4, 2018) – Dispatches
- Dwarfs In Art: a New Perspective (BBC Four, 2018)
- The Disordered Eye (BBC Four, 2020)
- The Million Pound Disability Payout (BBC One, 2020) – Panorama
- Targeted: The Truth About Disability Hate Crime (BBC Two, 2021)
- The Truth About Disability Benefits (Channel 4, 2021)
- Locked Away: Our Autism Scandal (Channel 4, 2022)

== Awards ==
- 2008: Best Director, Moscow Breaking Barriers Film Festival
- 2010: Merit Award, Superfest International Disability Film Festival, for The Last American Freak Show
- 2013: Medical Journalists Association awards, Commended, for Britain on the Sick
- 2018: Sheffield Doc/Fest Alternate Realities Interactive Award, for The Voice of the Unicorn
- 2022: Winner, British Journalism Awards: Personal Finance Journalism category
- 2022: Winner, Disability journalist of the year, Scope Disability Awards
