= Diana's Hair Ego =

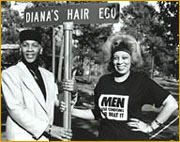
- Directed by: Ellen Spiro
- Produced by: Ellen Spiro
- Cinematography: Ellen Spiro
- Release date: 1991
- Running time: 29 minutes
- Country: United States
- Language: English

Diana's Hair Ego is an American documentary film about AIDS and one unconventional woman's efforts to educate her small, Southern community. While documenting an AIDS quarantine controversy in South Carolina with DIVA TV (Damned Interfering Video Activist TV), filmmaker Ellen Spiro met DiAna DiAna, a local hairdresser who transformed her beauty parlor into a center for AIDS and safe sex information.

Dubbed "the little video that could" on National Public Radio, Diana’s Hair Ego traveled the world, premiering at the American Film Institute and at International Public Television Conference (INPUT) in Dublin. It was the first small format video to be broadcast on national television. Diana's Hair Ego was reviewed in The New York Times as "addressing AIDS and sexuality with refreshing directness and humor without losing touch with its serious subject matter." The Atlanta Constitution called it "the activist documentary of the '90s” and The Boston Globe called it a “terrific portrait of a remarkable woman”.

== Awards ==
- Documentary Achievement Award, Motion Picture Society
- First Prize, National Black Programming Consortium Prized Pieces (1991)
- Juror's Award, Black Maria Film and Video Festival (1991)
- Silver Apple Award, National Educational Film and Video Festival (1991)
- Golden Gate Award, San Francisco International Film Festival (1991)
- Australian International Video Festival, Honorable Mention (1991)
- Atlanta Film and Video Festival, Best Activist Video Award (1990)
- Louisville Film and Video Festival, Special Merit Award (1990)
- Charlotte Film and Video Festival, Silver Medal Award (1990)
- International Television Association, Finalist, Videofest '90s

== Articles ==
Montegomery, Matt. AIDS Videos Document History of Grass Roots Organization. Emory Report. 1995–12. Retrieved on 2007-6-27.

Turning a Salon into 'A Salon. Media Rights: Media That Matters. 2003-1-22. Retrieved on 2007-6-27.
