= Roam Sweet Home =

- Theatrical release poster
- Directed by: Ellen Spiro
- Written by: Allan Gurganus
- Produced by: Ellen Spiro
- Narrated by: Allan Gurganus (as Sam the Dog)
- Cinematography: Ellen Spiro
- Edited by: Craig Paull; Suzanne Rostock
- Production company: Independent Television Service
- Distributed by: Video Data Bank
- Release date: 1996
- Running time: 57 minutes
- Country: United States
- Language: English

Roam Sweet Home is a 1996 American documentary film directed by Ellen Spiro. In road-trip style, it follows the lives of retirees who live on the road full-time in trailers, due to economic necessity, pleasure, or bot.

== Premise ==
Filmmaker Spiro and her dog, Sam, join a community of American nomads in order to explore their unconventional lifestyle first hand. Through Spiro's innovative and interpersonal style of filmmaking she captures the spirit of the roamers and the wide variety of reasons they abandoned the more traditional means of retirement. One group of women discusses the thrill of independence and sheer freedom they discovered after escaping repressive relationships. Another expounds upon the pleasures of traveling unencumbered throughout the country.

The film is narrated by Spiro's dog, Sam, with the voice provided by Allan Gurganus, who shares his perspective on the whims and follies of human nature. Aging himself, Sam adds an emotional perspective through his musings on death and the journey through life.

== Awards ==
- Grand Prize at the Big Muddy Film Festival
- National Media Owl award presented by Gene Siskel for the Retirement Research Foundation
