= Casa Mesita =

Two separate US non-profit organizations

Coordinates: 35°52′49.9″N 106°17′40.2″W

Casa Mesita refers to two separate non-profit organizations in Los Alamos, New Mexico. Casa Mesita Thrift Shop and Casa Mesita Group Home are two of many social enterprise organizations in Los Alamos County, one of the highest-income counties in the United States, in a state with household income far below the national median.

== Casa Mesita Thrift Shop ==
Casa Mesita Thrift Shop (NMSCC 0833772, Casa Mesita Thrift Shop Inc.) is a non-profit organization that operates a thrift shop for the purpose of supporting a group home for girls. The thrift shop sells donated, mostly used goods. The organization is 100% volunteer run; it has no employees and pays no salaries and no wages. At times, the thrift shop has paid casual labor to transport unsellable items to the municipal landfill.

The thrift shop benefits society by providing:

- significant financial and other support to Casa Mesita Group Home
- urgently needed clothing and household items to local families in distress due to fires and other catastrophes
- surplus donations to deserving clients of other local non-profit organizations
- additional surplus donations to Clothes for Kids, Salvation Army, an orphanage in Mexico, and other non-profit organizations
- an efficient, socially and environmentally responsible way for donors to discard usable material goods
- high quality goods at low cost to residents of Los Alamos and the surrounding area
- greater variety of retail shopping in Los Alamos

In 2005, Casa Mesita Thrift Shop purchased a larger single-family house for the group home. The thrift shop was also the owner of the previous house that had been occupied by the group home. The group home pays no rent to the thrift shop.

Also in 2005, the thrift shop moved from its long-term location in a garage on a back street (15th Street) to a storefront facing the local supermarket across a parking lot (Meri Mac shopping plaza between Trinity and Central). The new location increased traffic to the thrift shop but meant that the thrift shop no longer could accept as many donations of bulkier items such as couches, major household appliances (white goods), construction materials, and moving boxes. Alternative solutions for major appliances and construction materials include giving them away through the Los Alamos chapter of Freecycle, and donating them to Habitat for Humanity ReStores in Española and Santa Fe. The Española ReStore has a drop-off location in Los Alamos. Cardboard moving boxes in very good condition can be passed on to others via Freecycle or by calling local real estate agencies. A local package shipper, UPEX, accepts donations of used foam peanuts. Casa Mesita sells books about cooking, crafts, home repair, health, general reference, popular novels, and children's books. Other books can be donated at Mesa Public Library, where the Friends of the Library Bookstore accepts many used books for resale and an informal free book swap operates in the library lobby. Laboratory equipment can be sold or donated to Ed Grothus's laboratory surplus shop, The Black Hole. In 2009, Casa Mesita re-opened its doors to young girls in need, after being closed for two years due to lack of state funding.

== Casa Mesita Group Home ==
Casa Mesita Group Home (NMSCC 0724302, Casa Mesita Inc.) is a group home for up to 8 girls aged 12–18, founded in 1972 to shelter girls in need of a safe place to live. It is a United Way agency.
