= Janire Nájera =

Spanish multimedia artist, documentary photographer and producer

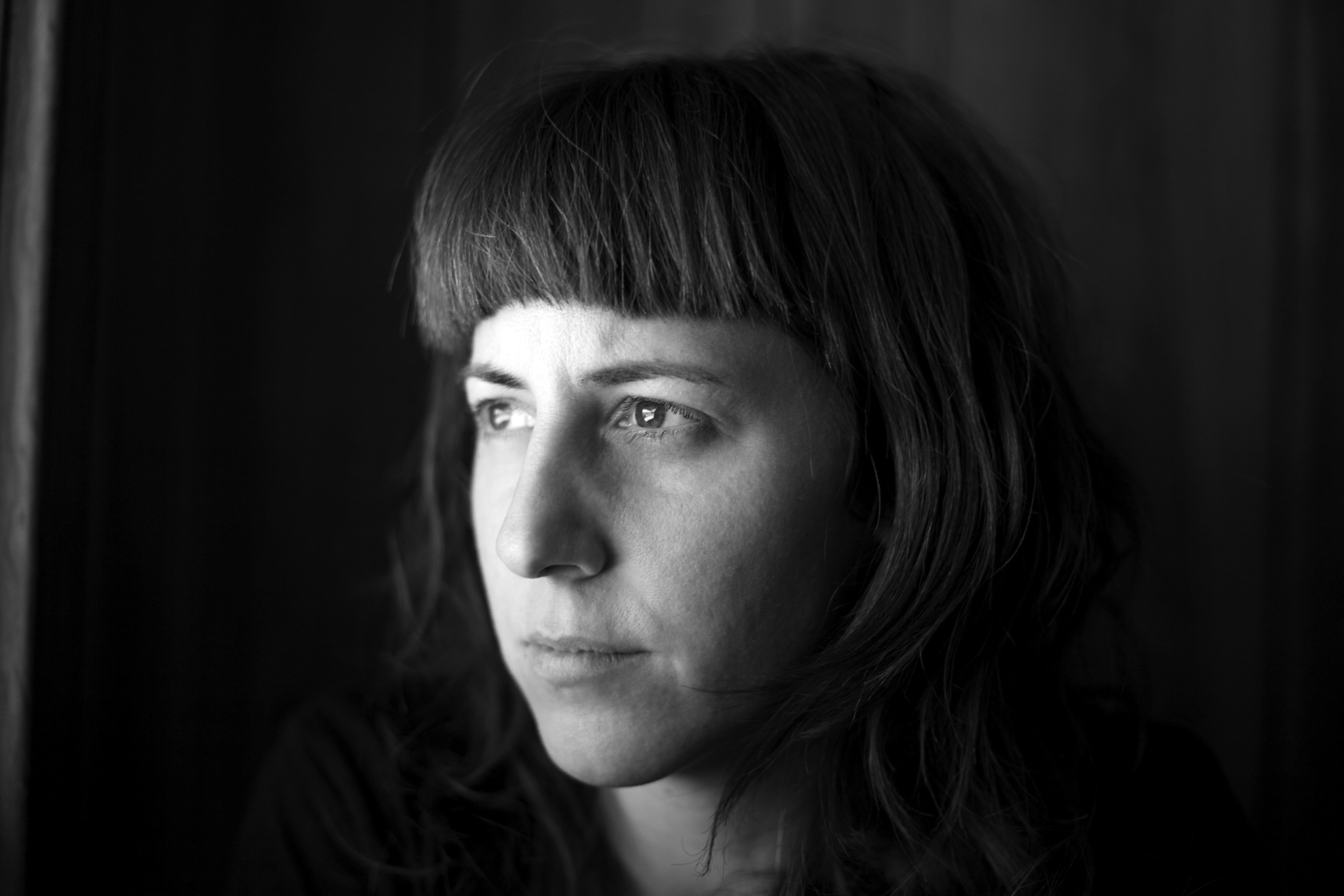
- Born: Bilbao, Basque Country
- Known for: Documentary photography, immersive arts, fulldome
- Website: janirenajera.com

Janire Nájera (born 1981) is a Spanish multimedia artist, documentary photographer and producer, living and working in Cardiff, Wales.

Nájera has specialised in storytelling through immersive media, founding Europe's first immersive research lab, CULTVR Lab in 2019 to assist in the development and presentation of digital arts, live performance, and fulldome cinema.

Her publications include Atomic Ed (2019), unveiling the journey of Ed Grothus from working in Los Alamos National Laboratory in New Mexico to becoming an outspoken anti-nuclear activist; and Moving Forward Looking Back: Journeys Across the Old Spanish Trail (2015), a documentary project looking for the traces of intangible heritage that evoke Spanish culture in the American Southwest.

== Life and work ==
Nájera was born in Bilbao, Basque Country. She grew up in Nájera, la Rioja until she settled in Madrid to study a BA in Communications Sciences at Universidad Complutense. Later on, Nájera studied documentary photography at University of Wales, Newport. In 2017 she was a Research scholar at Wilkinson College of Arts, Humanities, and Social Sciences, at Chapman University, California. In 2018 she was an artist in residence at Society of Arts and Technology (SAT), Montreal, Canada.

=== Moving forward, looking back ===
Looking for the traces of intangible heritage that evokes Spanish culture in the American Southwest, Nájera travelled along the Old Spanish Trail following in the footsteps of Antonio Armijo, who first opened this trade route in the 19th century. Her project combines a collection of portraits and interviews with the travel diary written by Nájera during the trip. Through a contemporary artistic language, Moving Forward, Looking Back provides an insight into how the traditions of the first settlers have merged with local cultures and have influenced the identity of today’s pueblos and modern cities in the states of New Mexico and California.

=== Atomic Ed ===
Atomic Ed is about american antinuclear activist Ed Grothus who worked at the Los Alamos National Laboratory in New Mexico for two decades. Ed Grothus had first arrived at this hidden outpost of science to work as a machinist for the laboratory in 1949. During what Ed considered to be an unjust Vietnam War he felt no longer able to support the development of nuclear weapons and left his job becoming one of the most outspoken protestors of the 20th Century. Najera undertook extensive research to collect archival documents, past and recent photographs and a selection of letters from over 50 years of correspondence between Ed Grothus and politicians, scientists, the media and his family taking us back and forth through the nuclear history of the USA.

=== CULTVR Lab ===
CULTVR is Europe’s first immersive arts venue facilitating research into the production, development and exhibition of shared immersive cultural experiences. CULTVR provides an environment for researchers, producers, technologists, film and theatre makers, artists, academics and performers to come together in the pursuit of fulldome cinema, digital arts, Virtual Reality and immersive experiences. It opened its doors in Cardiff in 2019.

== Publications ==
- Ghosts in Armour. Bilbao: Fundación Bilbao Arte Fundazioa, 2010. Edition of 600 copies.
- Moving Forward, Looking Back. Barcelona: RM, 2015. ISBN 9788416282197. Edition of 1000 copies.
- Atomic Ed. Barcelona: RM, 2019. ISBN 9788417047610. With a foreword by Celia Jackson. Edition of 1500 copies.

== Exhibitions ==
=== Solo exhibitions ===
- 2015: Moving Forward, Looking Back, FRAS, Washington, D.C.
- 2015: Moving Forward, Looking Back, Diffusion Photography Festival, Cardiff, UK
- 2015: Moving Forward, Looking Back, ZAWP Bilbao, Basque Country, Spain
- 2016: The Black Hole, Ayuntamiento de Logroño, La Rioja, Spain
- 2016: Moving Forward, Looking Back, National Hispanic Cultural Center, Albuquerque, New Mexico, USA (March–September)
- 2017: Moving Forward, Looking Back, Chapman University, California, USA (February–June)

== Multimedia projects ==
- Liminality Live, Cardiff-Montreal. 4Pi Productions and Society of Arts & Technology. 2018.
- Juniper, Cardiff. Slowly Rolling Camera and 4Pi Productions. 2019.
- Black Mantis. Cardiff. Deri Roberts and 4Pi Productions. 2020.

== Awards ==
- 2009: 100 European Young Talents, Europe's Creative Regions and Cities
- 2016: Winner UK, Flash Forward, Magenta Foundation
- 2018: Best Artistic Film, Macon Film Festival Fulldome, for Liminality (director and producer)
- 2018: Best Short Film, Janus Award 12th Jena Fulldome Festival, for Liminality (director and producer)
- 2018: Best Short Film, Minsk International Fulldome Festival, for Liminality (director and producer)
