= Troop 1500 =

- Directed by: Ellen Spiro
- Produced by: Karen Bernstein
- Cinematography: Ellen Spiro, Deb Lewis
- Release date: 2005
- Running time: 68 minutes
- Country: United States
- Language: English

Troop 1500 is a documentary film which won two Gracie Awards from the American Women in Radio & Television (AWRT) in the Individual Achievement Award for Outstanding Director and Outstanding Documentary. The nationally broadcast film (PBS) follows a unique Girl Scouts of the USA troop which unites mothers and daughters monthly behind the bars at the Hilltop Unit, a prison of the Texas Department of Criminal Justice, in Gatesville, Texas. All of the mothers have been convicted of serious crimes and are serving long sentences.

The troop's activities are centered on rebuilding the tenuous relationships, and addition to arts and crafts and learning life skills, the mothers and daughters bond by asking and answering tough questions of each other.

For more than five years, filmmaker Ellen Spiro worked with the leaders and girls of Troop 1500, the "prison troop," as a volunteer and mentor. She spent the first year with the troop training the girls in cinematography, sound and editing, and then she began making Troop 1500 in which the girls occupy front and center of the film, as subjects as well as crew.

== Awards ==
- American Women in Radio & Television (AWRT) 32nd annual Gracie Award
- Individual Achievement Award for Outstanding Director
- Outstanding Documentary (long format division)
- Commendation from the Texas State Legislature (Senate Resolution 545)

== Articles ==
Austin, Liz. Film Documents Scout Troop's Efforts to Break Cycle of Crime. Amarillo Globe News. 2006-3-18. Retrieved on 2007-6-24.

Evans, Kate. Troop 1500: Girls with Mums in Prison, Together. Life Matters. 2006-4-20. Retrieved on 2007-6-24.

Geisler, Erin. Troop 1500: Girl Scouts Beyond Bars. The University of Texas at Austin, Office of Public Affairs. 2005-3-14. Retrieved 2007-6-22.

Grant, Darlene. (2006). Resilience of girls with incarcerated mothers: The impact of Girl Scouts. The Prevention Researcher, 13(2), 11-14.

Guiding Kids Through Troop 1500. Official Website of the Girl Scouts of the USA. 2006 newsletter. Retrieved 2007-6-22.

Hill, Alison Michelle. Troop 1500: The Real Deal on a Reality Movie. Studio 2B: The Place for Teens. Retrieved 2007-6-22.

Holt, Cody. Job: Video Reunion. DigitalContentProducer.com. 2006-6-1. Retrieved on 2007-6-24.

Karnasiewicz, Sarah. Tough Cookies. Salon.com. 2006-3-21. Retrieved on 2007-6-18.

Kasten, Susan. Troop 1500. Beloit College Magazine. Summer 2006. Retrieved 2007-6-22.

Neff, Nancy. Beyond Bars: Special Girl Scout Troop Helps Young Women Connect with Their Mothers in Prison. The University of Texas at Austin Online Features. 2006-1-23. Retrieved on 2007-6-22.

S., Brianna. Finding and Filming Your Passions: An Interview with Filmmaker Ellen Spiro, Part I. Studio 2B: The Place for Teens. Retrieved 2007-6-22.

S., Brianna. and Filming Your Passions: An Interview with Filmmaker Ellen Spiro, Part II. Studio 2B: The Place for Teens. Retrieved 2007-6-22.

Scheib, Ronnie. Troop 1500: Girl Scouts Behind Bars. Variety. 2005-3-15. Retrieved on 2007-6-17.

Swan, Marion. Troop 1500 Documentary on Texas Girl Scout Council Premieres at South By Southwest Film Festival. Official Website of the Girl Scouts of the USA. 2005-3-3. Retrieved 2007-6-22.

Swan, Marion. Emmy Award-Winning PBS Series Independent Lens to Host Broadcast Premiere of 'Troop 1500'. Official Website of the Girl Scouts of the USA. 2006-3-9. Retrieved on 2007-6-24.
