= Are the Kids Alright? =

- Directed by: Ellen Spiro
- Country of origin: United States
- Original language: English

Production
- Producer: Karen Bernstein
- Cinematography: Ellen Spiro
- Running time: 56 minutes

Original release
- Release: June 24, 2004

Are the Kids Alright? is a documentary film which explores mental health care for children and youths at risk in Texas. The filmmaker, Ellen Spiro, gained unprecedented access to troubled children and their families, as well as the judicial, psychiatric and correctional institutions. By following several different families, the filmmakers document the results of the decline in the availability of mental health services for the youth who most desperately need it.

== Awards and conference screenings ==
- Emmy for Outstanding Documentary (2005)
- Texas Mental Health Association Award
- Best of Austin / Most Pertinent Media
- United Nations Association Film Festival
- Merit Award, Superfest International Disability Film Festival
- Western Psychological Association
- Picture This... Disability Film Festival

== Articles ==
- Geisler, Erin, "Professor’s documentary wins Emmy award", University of Texas at Austin press release, October 18, 2005. Retrieved June 22, 2007.
- "Documentary Illustrates Issues of Children’s Mental Health in Texas", HF News, vol. 38, Spring/Summer 2004, Hogg Foundation for Mental Health. Retrieved June 22, 2007.
