= Ellen Spiro =

American film director

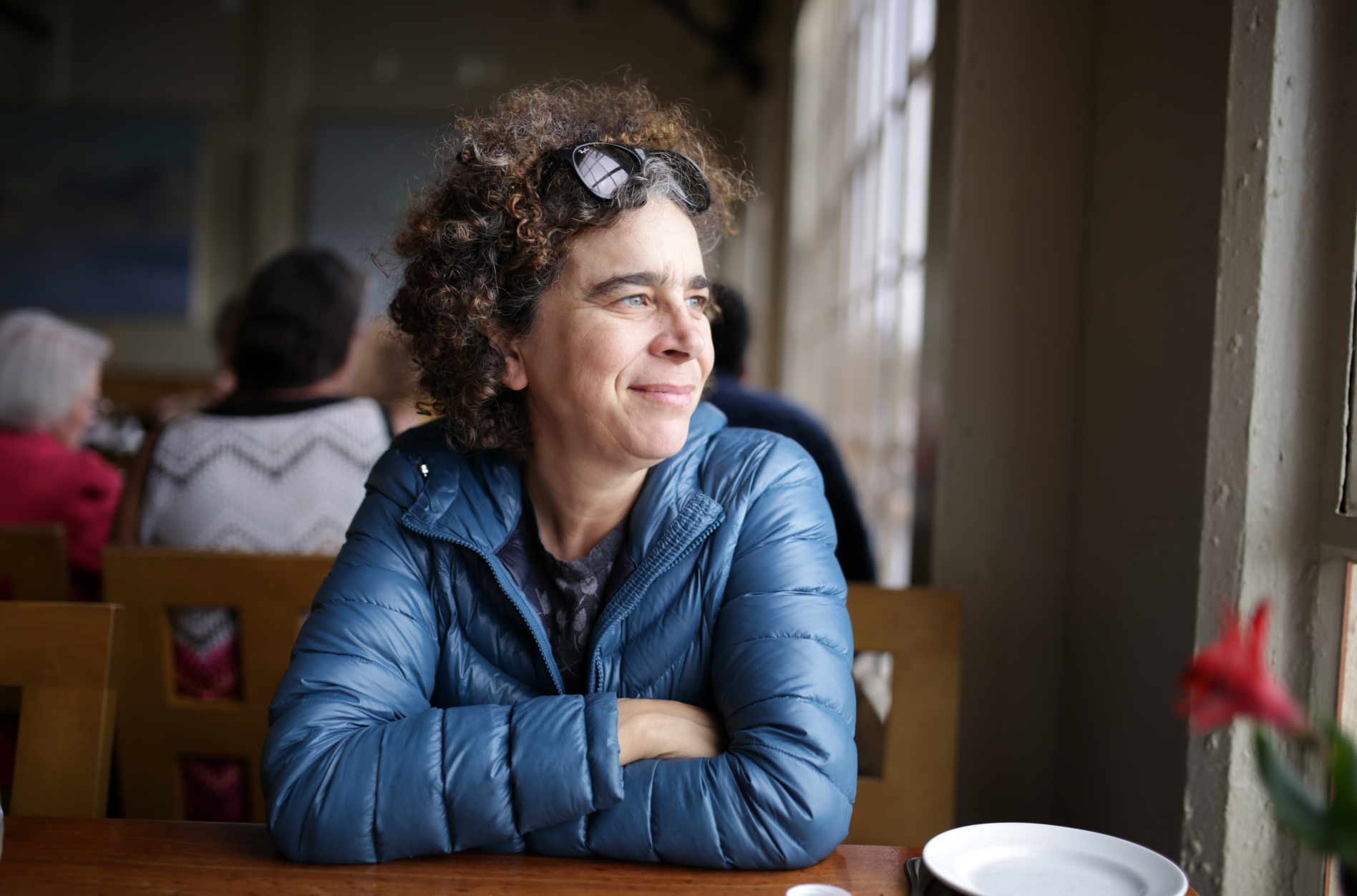
- Spiro in 2016
- Born: New Brunswick, New Jersey, US
- Parent(s): Jack and Marilyn Spiro of New Orleans, Louisiana.

Ellen Spiro is an American documentary filmmaker. She is a producer and director of the television documentary Are the Kids Alright?, which won an Emmy Award in 2005.

== Career ==
Her early work was shot on a compact Sony palmcorder and highlighted gay and lesbian stories. One of her earliest works, Diana's Hair Ego, was the first small format video to be broadcast on national television. Her work was presented twice in the Museum of Modern Art.

Spiro created the 10 Under 10 Film Festival in Austin, TX.

In 2006, Spiro was awarded an artist's residency at the Bellagio Center, sponsored by the Rockefeller Foundation, in Bellagio, Italy. She worked with Phil Donahue on Body of War, a film about paralyzed Iraq War veteran Tomas Young, which premiered at the Toronto International Film Festival and won a 'People's Choice Award' and the 'Audience Award for Best Documentary' at the Hamptons International Film Festival. It was shortlisted for nomination for an Academy Award in 2007. In December, Body of War was named Best Documentary of 2007 by the National Board of Review.

Spiro is a professor at the University of Texas at Austin, where she has taught graduate and undergraduate courses in documentary, experimental film, and music film production in the Department of Radio-TV-Film. She is also a visiting professor at the University of California at Berkeley.

== Films ==
- Fixing the Future (2010–2012)
- Body of War (2007)
- Troop 1500 (2005)
- Are the Kids Alright? (2003)
- Atomic Ed and the Black Hole (2002)
- Roam Sweet Home (1996)
- Greetings From Out Here (1993)
- Diana's Hair Ego (1991)
- Women on the Line: The Effect of Deindustrialization on Women in Buffalo (1988)
