= Tomas Young =

U.S. Army soldier and anti-war activist (1979–2014)

- Young in 2007, visiting Ground Zero (from the documentary Body of War)
- Born: Tomas Vincent Young; November 30, 1979; Kansas City, Missouri, U.S.
- Died: November 10, 2014 (aged 34); Seattle, Washington, U.S.
- Spouses: Brie Young (m. 2005; div. 2006); Claudia Cuellar (m. 2012)
- Military career
- Allegiance: United States of America
- Branch: United States Army
- Service years: 2001–2004
- Rank: Specialist (SPC/E-4)
- Unit: 1st Cavalry Division
- Conflicts: Iraq War (WIA)

Tomas Young (November 30, 1979 – November 10, 2014) was an American military veteran of the Iraq War. In 2004, he was wounded and paralyzed by a bullet to the spine five days after he reached Iraq. One of the first veterans to come out publicly against the war, Young actively protested against the war after he returned to the United States. When his physical condition worsened in 2013 due to various medical complications, Young chose to go into hospice care. He later reversed that decision and accepted medical treatment until he died in 2014.

== Military career ==
Two days after the September 11 attacks, Young was inspired by President George W. Bush to enlist in the United States Army. He hoped both to gain the chance to attend college through the G.I. Bill and, in his words, "exact some form of retribution" on those who caused the attacks.

On April 4, 2004, five days after being sent to Iraq, Young was shot while riding in an open, unarmored truck during an ambush staged by rebels in Sadr City. One of the bullets pierced his spine and left him paralyzed from the chest down.

He returned home to Kansas City, Missouri. He joined Iraq Veterans Against the War (IVAW) and later became one of the first veterans to publicly criticize the Iraq War.

== Health complications ==
In 2007, he experienced an episode of deep vein thrombosis in his right arm. Six months later, this recurred, causing a pulmonary embolism, and the resulting anoxic brain injury left him a partial quadriplegic.

== Body of War ==
Body of War is a documentary directed by Ellen Spiro and Phil Donahue about Young as he adapts to his paralyzed body and questions his motives for having enlisted in the army.

== The Last Letter ==
I write this letter, my last letter, to you, Mr. Bush and Mr. Cheney. I write not because I think you grasp the terrible human and moral consequences of your lies, manipulation and thirst for wealth and power. I write this letter because, before my own death, I want to make it clear that I, and hundreds of thousands of my fellow veterans, along with millions of my fellow citizens, along with hundreds of millions more in Iraq and the Middle East, know fully who you are and what you have done. You may evade justice but in our eyes, you are each guilty of egregious war crimes, of plunder and, finally, of murder, including the murder of thousands of young Americans—my fellow veterans—whose future you stole.
—Tomas Young, The Last Letter

In March 2013, Truthdig columnist Chris Hedges published an interview with Young about his worldview and circumstances. Young was in hospice care at the time, and the interview was conducted at his home in Kansas City. Although Young had contemplated suicide on various occasions, he had decided "to go on hospice care, to stop feeding and fade away. This way, instead of committing the conventional suicide and I am out of the picture, people have a way to stop by or call and say their goodbyes." He later changed his mind, saying "I want to spend as much time as possible with my wife, and no decent son wants his obituary to read that he was survived by his mother."

That same month, on the tenth anniversary of the Iraq War, Truthdig published "The Last Letter" by Young directed to former President George W. Bush and Dick Cheney. In the letter, Young accused Bush and Cheney of war crimes, said that millions of Americans and Iraqis know "who you [Bush and Cheney] are and what you have done", and condemned "the inadequate and often inept care provided by the Veterans Administration", saying "I have, like many other disabled veterans, come to realize that our mental and physical wounds are of no interest to you, perhaps of no interest to any politician. We were used. We were betrayed. And we have been abandoned." He said that he believed that the Bush administration considered military personnel and veterans to be expendable, and expressed hope that U.S. leaders would have the courage to apologize for the damage wrought by the war.

== Death ==
Young died on November 10, 2014, in Seattle, Washington. In November 2014, Chris Hedges and Ralph Nader each wrote a column on Young's passing. Hedges stated that "Young hung on as long as he could. Now he is gone. He understood what the masters of war had done to him, how he had been used and turned into human refuse."

== Tomas Young's War ==
Author Mark Wilkerson interviewed Tomas Young several times in 2013 and 2014. He wrote a biography Tomas Young's War, published by Haymarket Books in 2016. The book is also based on Wilkerson's interviews with Young's mother, brother and wife, and close friends, including celebrities Eddie Vedder, Tom Morello and Phil Donahue. Artist Shepard Fairey created the book's cover art.
