= Phil Donahue =

American talk show host (1935–2024)

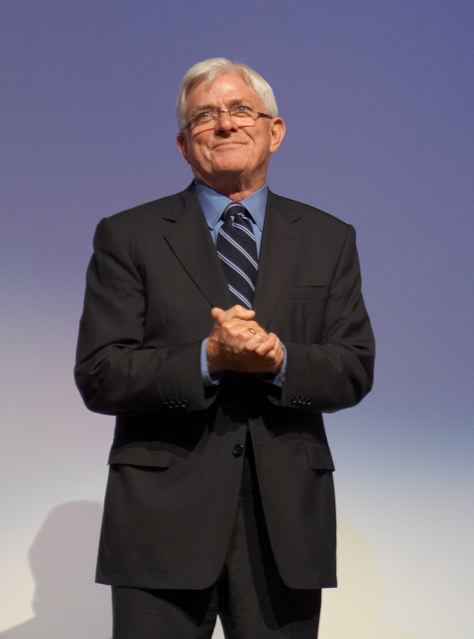
- Donahue in 2007
- Born: Phillip John Donahue; December 21, 1935; Cleveland, Ohio, U.S.
- Died: August 18, 2024 (aged 88); New York City, U.S.
- Education: University of Notre Dame (BBA)
- Occupations: Talk show host; writer; film producer
- Years active: 1957–2024
- Spouses: Margaret Cooney (m. 1958; div. 1975) Marlo Thomas (m. 1980)
- Children: 5

Phillip John Donahue (December 21, 1935 – August 18, 2024) was an American media personality, writer, film producer, and the creator and host of The Phil Donahue Show. The television program, later known simply as Donahue, was the first popular talk show to feature a format that included audience participation. The show had a 29-year run on national television that began in Dayton, Ohio, in 1967 and ended in New York City in 1996.

Donahue's shows often focused on issues that divide liberals and conservatives in the United States, such as abortion, consumer protection, civil rights, and war issues. His most frequent guest was Ralph Nader, for whom Donahue campaigned in 2000. Donahue also briefly hosted a talk show on MSNBC from July 2002 to February 2003. Donahue was one of the most influential talk show hosts and was often referred to as the "king of daytime talk". Oprah Winfrey has said, "If it weren't for Phil Donahue, there would never have been an Oprah Show." In 1996, Donahue was ranked No. 42 on TV Guide's 50 Greatest TV Stars of All Time.

== Early life ==
Donahue was born on December 21, 1935, into a middle-class, Irish Catholic family in Cleveland, Ohio; his father, Phillip Donahue, was a furniture sales clerk, while his mother, Catherine (née McClory), was a department store shoe clerk. In 1949, he graduated from Our Lady of Angels Elementary School in the West Park neighborhood. In 1953, Donahue was a member of the first graduating class of St. Edward High School, an all-boys college preparatory Catholic private high school in Lakewood, Ohio. He graduated from the University of Notre Dame, with a Bachelor of Business Administration degree, in 1957.

== Career ==
=== Early career ===
Donahue began his career in 1957 as a production assistant at KYW radio and television when that station was in Cleveland. He got a chance to become an announcer one day when the regular announcer failed to show up. After a brief stint as a bank check sorter in Albuquerque, New Mexico, he became program director for WABJ radio in Adrian, Michigan, soon after graduating. He moved on to become a stringer for the CBS Evening News and later, an anchor of the morning newscast at WHIO-TV in Dayton, Ohio, where his interviews with Jimmy Hoffa and Billie Sol Estes were picked up nationally. While in Dayton, Donahue also hosted Conversation Piece, an afternoon phone-in talk show from 1963 to 1967 on WHIO radio. In Dayton, Donahue interviewed presidential candidate John F. Kennedy, late-night talk show host Johnny Carson, human rights activist Malcolm X, and Vietnam war opponents including Jerry Rubin. In Chicago and New York City, Donahue interviewed Elton John, heavyweight boxing champions Muhammad Ali and Joe Frazier, and author and political activist Noam Chomsky.

=== The Phil Donahue Show ===
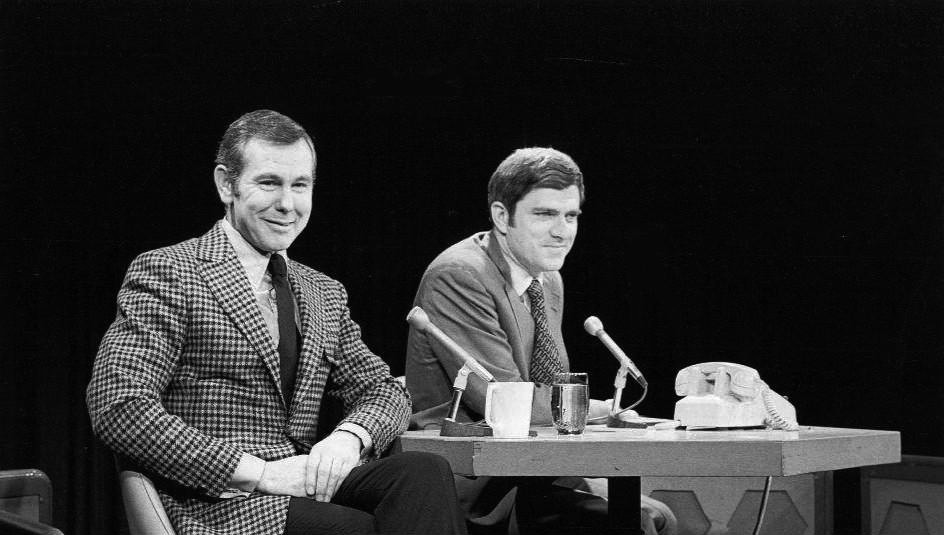
Donahue (right) with guest Johnny Carson in August 1970

On November 6, 1967, Donahue left WHIO, moving his talk program with The Phil Donahue Show on WLWD (now WDTN), also in Dayton. Initially, the program was shown only on other stations owned by the Crosley Broadcasting Corporation (which would later take the name of its parent Avco Company), which also owned WLWD. But, in January 1970, The Phil Donahue Show entered nationwide syndication. Donahue's syndicated show moved from Dayton, Ohio, to Chicago in 1974; then in 1985, he moved the show to New York City. Ιn 1975, Donahue interviewed the Nazi regime's minister of armaments Albert Speer, some nine years after October 1966, when the convicted war criminal was released from prison. The almost one-hour-and-a-half interview was filmed in Speer's home, in Heidelberg, and broadcast in two parts, on November 20 and 21, 1975.

While hosting his own program, Donahue also appeared on NBC's The Today Show as a contributor, from 1979 until 1988.

After a 29-year run—26 years in syndication and nearly 7,000 one-hour daily shows—the final original episode of Donahue aired on September 13, 1996.

=== U.S.–Soviet Space Bridge ===
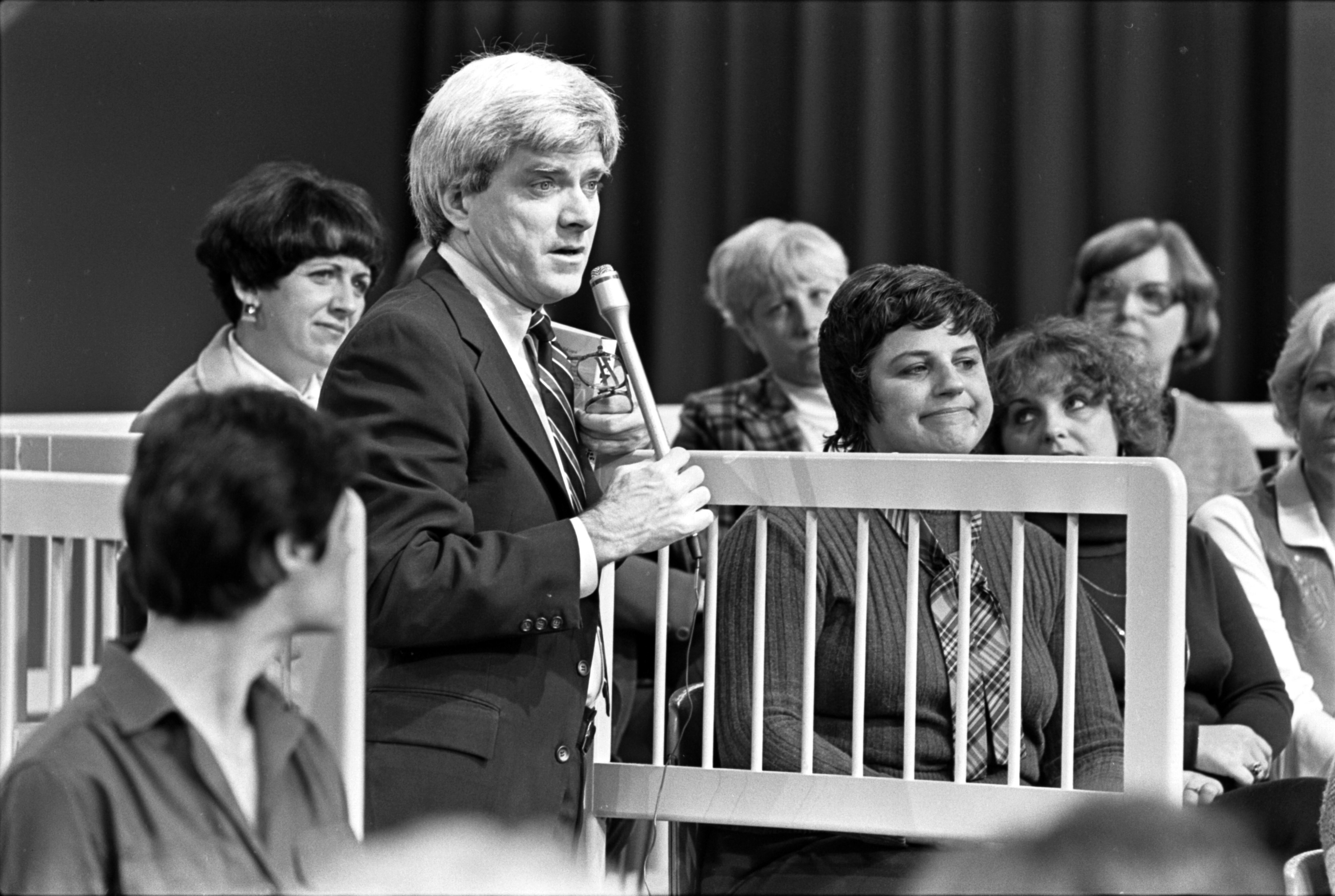
Donahue during a 1980 episode

In the 1980s, during the Cold War period of openness by the USSR, Donahue and Soviet journalist Vladimir Pozner co-hosted a series of televised discussions, known as the U.S.–Soviet Space Bridge, among everyday citizens of the Soviet Union and the United States. It was the first event of its kind in broadcasting history: Donahue hosted an audience in a U.S. city while Pozner hosted an audience in a Soviet city, all on one television program. Members of both audiences asked each other questions about both nations. While the governments of both nations were preparing for the possibility of nuclear war, Donahue said: "We reached out instead of lashed out." From 1991 to 1994 Donahue and Pozner co-hosted Pozner/Donahue, a weekly, issues-oriented roundtable program, which aired both on CNBC and in syndication. His wife Marlo Thomas created a children's version in 1988 entitled Free to Be... A Family. Donahue and Pozner became long-time friends after the experience.

=== MSNBC program ===
In July 2002, Donahue returned to television after seven years of retirement to host a show called Donahue on MSNBC. On February 25, 2003, MSNBC canceled the show. Soon after the show's cancellation, an internal MSNBC memo was leaked to the press stating that Donahue should be fired because he opposed the imminent U.S. invasion of Iraq and that he would be a "difficult public face for NBC in a time of war" and that his program could be "a home for the liberal anti-war agenda". Donahue commented in 2007 that the management of MSNBC, owned at the time by General Electric, a major defense contractor, required that "we have two conservative (guests) for every liberal. I was counted as two liberals."

=== Body of War ===
External videos
- Q&A interview with Donahue on Body of War, March 23, 2008, C-SPAN

In 2006, Donahue served as co-director with independent filmmaker Ellen Spiro for the feature documentary film Body of War. The film tells the story of Tomas Young, a severely disabled Iraq War veteran and his turbulent postwar adjustments. In November 2007, the film was named as one of fifteen documentaries to be in consideration for an Oscar nomination from the Academy of Motion Picture Arts and Sciences.

== Other appearances ==
In June 2013, Donahue and numerous other celebrities appeared in a video showing support for Chelsea Manning.

Donahue was interviewed for the documentary film Finding Vivian Maier (2013), about the posthumously recognized American street photographer and an acquaintance of his from the 1970s.

On May 24 and 25, 2016, Donahue spoke at Ralph Nader's "Breaking Through Power" conference at DAR Constitution Hall in Washington, D.C.

== Honors ==
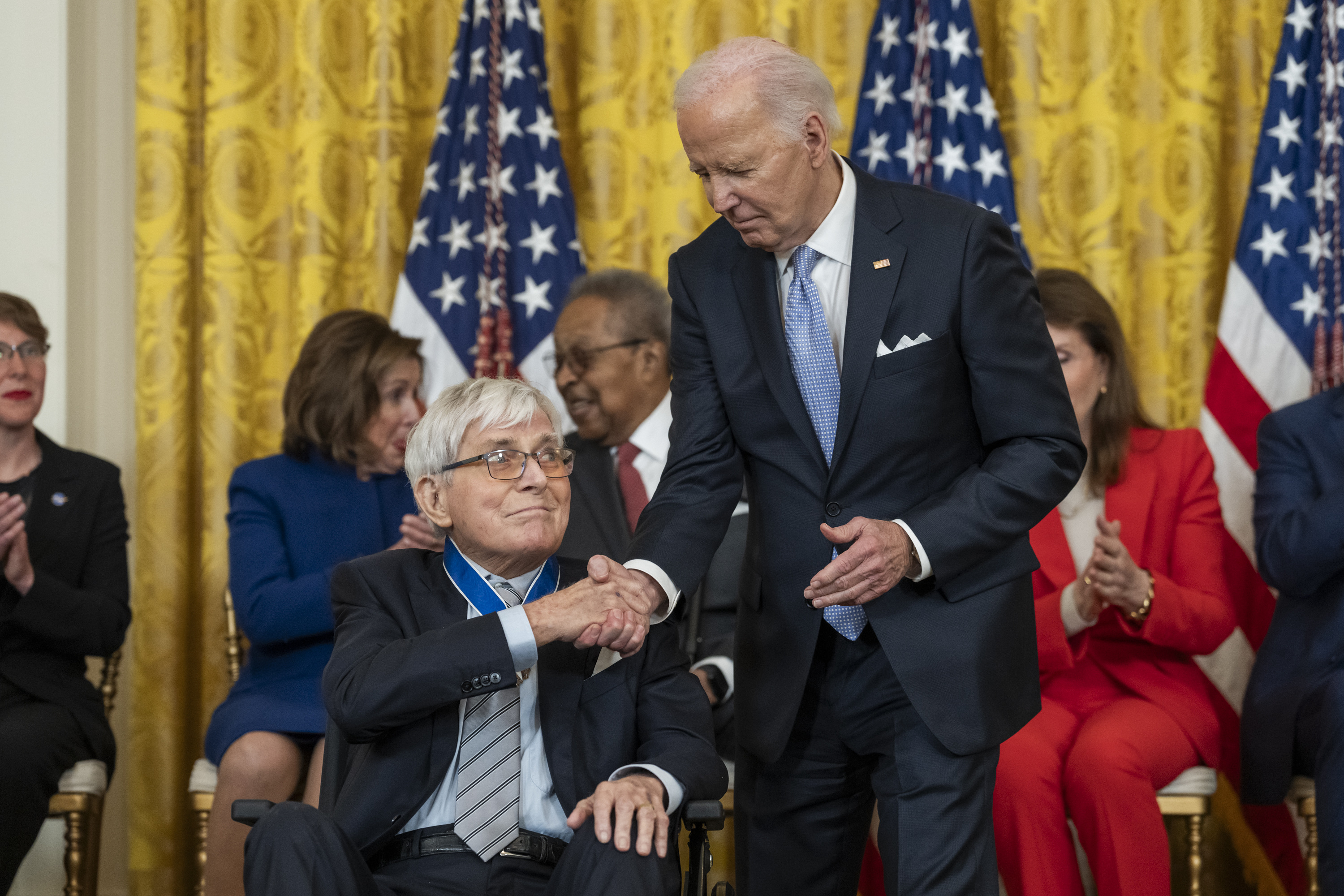
Donahue receiving the Presidential Medal of Freedom from President Joe Biden in May 2024

Donahue was nominated for 20 Daytime Emmy Awards during his broadcasting career, winning eight for Outstanding Talk Show Host The Phil Donahue Show, as well as receiving both a Special Recognition Award in 1993, and a Lifetime Achievement Award in 1996. He received the Peabody Award in 1980, and was inducted into the Academy of Television Arts & Sciences Hall of Fame on November 20, 1993. In 1987, he received the "Maggie" Award, highest honor of the Planned Parenthood Federation, in tribute to their founder, Margaret Sanger. In 2024, Donahue was awarded the Presidential Medal of Freedom by President Joe Biden.

== Personal life ==
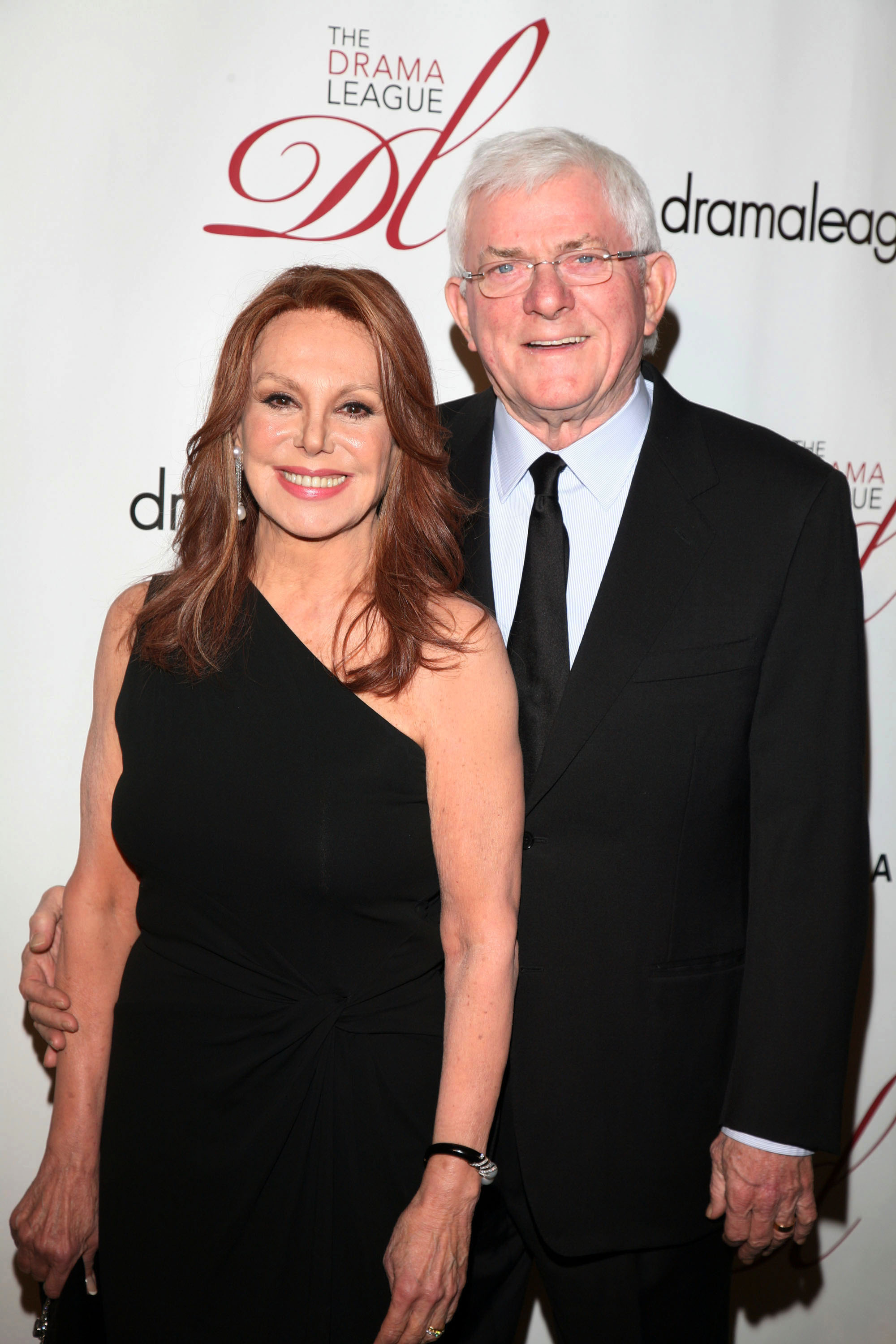
Marlo Thomas and Donahue in February 2012

In 1958, Donahue married Margaret Cooney and they had five children – Michael, Kevin, Daniel, Mary Rose, and James. They divorced in 1975, after which Margaret returned to her native New Mexico, remarried, and retired from public view. The family had lived in Centerville, Ohio, across the street from Erma Bombeck, a humorist who would become one of his contemporaries as a national voice in the 1970s and 1980s. For a brief period in the 1970s, Donahue employed photographer Vivian Maier as a nanny for his children.

Donahue married actress Marlo Thomas on May 21, 1980. He and Thomas had no children together.

In 1999, Donahue was considered as a host for the game show Greed along with Keith Olbermann, but Chuck Woolery was hired instead.

Regarding his religion, Donahue had stated: "I will always be a Catholic. But I want my church to join the human race and finally walk away from this anti-sexual theology." He also said that he is not "a very good Catholic", and that he did not think it was necessary to have his first marriage annulled. He had expressed admiration of Pope Francis.

In early August 2014, Donahue's youngest son, James Donahue, died suddenly at the age of 51 due to a ruptured aortic aneurysm.

== Death ==
Donahue died following a long illness at his home on the Upper East Side of Manhattan in New York City, on August 18, 2024, at the age of 88.

== In other media ==
In 2020, Donahue was portrayed by Tom O'Keefe in the TV series Mrs. America.
