= Patience for the Waiting =

EP by Jason Reeves
- Released: November 13, 2009
- Genre: Rock, pop, alternative
- Length: 24:02
- Label: Warner Bros. Records
- Producer: Adam B Smith

Jason Reeves chronology
| The Magnificent Adventures of Heartache [And Other Frightening Tales...] (2008) | Patience for the Waiting (2009) | The Lovesick (2011) |

Patience for the Waiting (Special Edition Acoustic EP) is an EP by American singer-songwriter and musician Jason Reeves.

== Background ==
Reeves began work on an EP while co-writing sessions with Colbie Caillat for her second album, Breakthrough, as well as writing sessions with other artists. He did more frequent bouts of touring, including a May 2009 Vespa-sponsored "green tour" with Brendan James and Amber Rubarth, during which they toured the California Coast on Vespa scooters while focusing on environmental friendliness. Near the end of 2009, the EP was released by Warner Bros. Records.

== Track listing ==
| No. | Title | Length |
|---|---|---|
| 1. | "Careless (Acoustic Version)" | 3:29 |
| 2. | "Echoes (Acoustic Version)" | 4:13 |
| 3. | "Everything is Eventual (Acoustic Version)" | 3:58 |
| 4. | "When Life Was Good (Acoustic Version)" | 4:45 |
| 5. | "Skydive (Acoustic Version)" | 4:27 |
| 6. | "Wishing Weed (Acoustic Version)" | 3:12 |
