= Mikal Blue =

English record producer (born 1966)

- Also known as: Michael Blue
- Born: 3 March 1966 (age 60); Bishop Auckland, England
- Origin: County Durham, England
- Genres: Pop rock, indie pop
- Occupations: Record producer; songwriter; audio engineer
- Instruments: Vocals, guitar, piano, drums, bass
- Website: revolverrecordings.com

Michael Blue (né Waggitt; born 3 March 1966) is an English record producer, songwriter, audio engineer and mixer. He has been credited on releases for pop and alternative rock acts including Colbie Caillat, Jason Reeves, Jason Mraz, Five For Fighting and OneRepublic.

Originally from County Durham, England, Blue moved to Los Angeles in 1992, shortly after which he formed his recording studio, Revolver Recordings in Thousand Oaks, California. Beginning as a recording artist, he signed with A&M Records and opened for artists including Sheryl Crow, Billy Idol and Allman Brothers, throughout the remaining decade. His debut studio album, Gold (2008), became his only release as a vocalist until shifting to work solely in production. Blue has cultivated burgeoning acts such as OneRepublic, Caillat, Augustana, Angel Taylor, Chandler Juliet and Kevin Hammond before their mainstream successes.

Blue is represented by Global Positioning Services in Santa Monica, California.

== Partial production discography ==
Artist	Song	Album	Producer	Engineer	Mixer	Co-writer
Chandler Juliet	"Speechless", "Don't Miss You"	(Singles)	check		check	
New Hollow		Forthcoming Album	check	check	check	check
Eamon	"Requiem"	Golden Rail Motel	check	check	check	check
Smokey		Forthcoming Album	check	check	check	check
Colbie Caillat		Forthcoming Album				check
Toad The Wet Sprocket		New Constellation	check	check	check	
Five For Fighting	"Godspell"	Forthcoming Album	check	check	check	
Joe Brooks	"Holes Inside"	A Reason to Swim	check		check	
Arthur Alligood		One Silver Needle	check	check	check	
Keaton Simons		Keaton Simons	check	check	check	
Lady Danville		Lady Danville EP	check	check	check	
Kevin Hammond		Kevin Hammond EP	check	check	check	check
Jason Mraz & Colbie Caillat	"Lucky"	We Sing. We Dance. We Steal Things.	check			Arr.
OneRepublic	"Sucker Punch". "Trap Door", "Passenger"	Waking Up (Deluxe Version)	check	check		
Jason Reeves		The Lovesick	check	check	check	
Jason Reeves		The Magnificent Adventures of Heartache	check	check	check	check
Jason Reeves		Patience for the Waiting (Special Edition Acoustic EP)	check	check	check	check
Five for Fighting		Two Lights		check		
Colbie Caillat		CoCo	check	check	check	
Colbie Caillat	"What I Wanted To Say", "Fearless"	Breakthrough				check
Colbie Caillat		Summer Sessions EP	check	check	check	check
OneRepublic	"Goodbye Apathy", "Tyrant", "Prodigal"	Dreaming Out Loud (Bonus Version)	check	check		
Angel Taylor		Love Travels	check	check	check	check
Brendan James		The Day Is Brave	check	check	check	check
Serena Ryder	"It Is O.K.", "Stumbling Over You"	It Is O.K.				check
Angel Taylor	"Like You Do", "Make Me Believe", "Spinning Wheel", "Don't Forget Me in Time"	Love Travels				check
Hope & Jason Mraz	"Love Love Love"	(Single)				check
Kassi	"Better Days"	(Single)	check	check	check	
