= The JaneDear Girls (album) =

Studio album by The JaneDear Girls
- Released: February 1, 2011
- Studio: Various (See background and recording section)
- Genre: Country pop
- Length: 36:46
- Label: Warner Music Nashville
- Producer: John Rich (exec.)

Singles from The JaneDear Girls
- 1. "Wildflower" Released: April 26, 2010; 2. "Shotgun Girl" Released: March 21, 2011; 3. "Merry Go Round" Released: August 2011

The JaneDear Girls is the debut studio album by American country music duo the JaneDear Girls. It was released on February 1, 2011, through Warner Music Nashville. John Rich helped the duo secure a record contract and was the album's executive producer. The JaneDear Girls have co-writing credits on the entire album, while Rich produced all its tracks. The JaneDear Girls is a country pop album consisting of eleven songs, which critics identified had several musical influences. The JaneDear Girls promoted the album by appearing on tours headlined by other country artists and at other events.

Reviews of The JaneDear Girls were mixed. The album peaked at number 46 on the Billboard 200 chart, and had sold 32,915 copies as of March 19, 2011. Three singles – "Wildflower", "Shotgun Girl", and "Merry Go Round" – were released. Each song appeared on Billboard charts, and received mixed feedback from critics. "Merry Go Round" was singled out by critics for its use of Auto-Tune. Following the album's release, the JaneDear Girls disbanded to pursue solo careers.

== Background and recording ==
Songwriter Kris Bergsnes introduced the JaneDear Girls members Susie Brown and Danelle Leverett to one another at a Nashville club in 2006. Several weeks after their initial meeting, the pair wrote six songs over two weekends. AllMusic's Steve Leggett reported that they felt a "strong musical affinity" for one another, leading them to write and record music together. Both women previously pursued solo careers and had experience playing musical instrumentals; Brown played the mandolin and fiddle, while Leverett played guitar. After forming the duo with Brown, Leverett quit her job selling health insurance to focus on music. When creating the group name, Leverett said they wanted something memorable and distinctly American. Rejected ideas included The Janes, The Dears, and Dear Jane. They had attempted to copyright the name Jane Dear, but were unable to do so due to conflicts with the John Deere company.

Brown and Leverett attracted attention from various record labels while performing in Nashville. With the support of John Rich, the duo secured a record deal with Warner Music Nashville, Sony/ATV Music Publishing, and the Turner Nichols & Associates Management firm. Brown and Leverett received the offer three years after they first met. The group performed their original ballad "Saturdays in September" as part of their audition for the label. A mentor for the JaneDear Girls, Rich served as the executive producer for their self-titled debut album. Brown and Leverett are credited as co-writers on all its tracks. The album was recorded in several recording studios in Nashville (Blackbird Studio, Brewbeat, David Axelrod Studio, and Sony Tree Studios) and California (Ollywood Studios, Petey Boy Studios, and RW Recordings).

== Composition and sound ==
The JaneDear Girls is a country pop album produced entirely by Rich. AllMusic's Stephen Thomas Erlewine described the songs as "tacky, spangly four-four beats and hook-heavy crossovers". Most of the album's instrumentation is provided by "fiddle, banjo, and cranked up electric guitar"; the lyrics revolve around "love, heartbreak and innocence lost", with some sexual themes. On the group's official website, Leverett wrote about their sound: "We like our guitars loud, our fiddles ripping and a steady beat that makes people want to dance!"

Music critics identified the album as having different musical influences. The New York Times' Jon Caramanica described the album as having influences from hip hop, teen pop, and R&B, and Westword's Bree Davis connected it with an "underlying flavor" of bluegrass music. Eric Allen of the American Songwriter likened the group's sound to Shania Twain and Taylor Swift due to their focus on girl power. the JaneDear Girls also received comparisons to Katy Perry based on their more pop sound and colorful costumes.

=== Songs ===
Brown wrote the album's opening song "Wildflower" on an electric mandolin and based it on her experiences growing up, describing it as a "female anthem". Along with the mandolin, its instrumentation also includes drums, bass, banjo, fiddle, and an electric guitar. The second track "Shotgun Girl" is an uptempo number inspired by Leverett's experiences in a relationship, in which she enjoyed riding shotgun with her boyfriend. The lyrics include references to country artists Waylon Jennings, Willie Nelson, and Merle Haggard.

"Merry Go Round"
The single's use of Auto-Tune was the subject of discussion from music critics.

The third track "Merry Go Round" was singled out by critics for commentary. Billy Dukes, writing for Taste Of Country, interpreted that its inclusion of fiddles and banjos was a way to soften its more hip hop chorus. Dukes compared the duo's vocals to Peter Frampton, and Stephen Thomas Erlewine wrote that the track was similar to music by Miranda Lambert and Carrie Underwood. Grady Smith of Entertainment Weekly said it had a "honky tonk banjo melody". Some commentators noted "Merry Go Round" for its use of Auto-Tune. Leverett said they added the effect due to a lack of time to complete the track, and kept parts of it in the final version as they liked it. Brown identified the Auto-Tune for the song, as well as their approach to the album track "Sugar", as the group's way of playing with different musical ideas.

The fifth track, "Saturdays in September", is the album's only ballad, and Jonathan Keefe of Slant Magazine compared the sixth song, "Sing Along", to the work of Natasha Bedingfield and Liz Phair. The following track "Lucky You" has an instrumental built on electric guitars and drums. The lyrics for the eighth song, "Pretender", focus on a person's first love, and its composition features "straight-out-of 80s keyboards". According to The New Zealand Herald, the duo adopt "country girl-tease personas" for the tenth track, "Free Ride". Jeffrey B. Remz of the Country Standard Time described the closing song, "Every Day's a Holiday", as an example of how the album was tailored for radio play. "Baby It's You" is included as a bonus track on some editions of the album.

== Singles ==
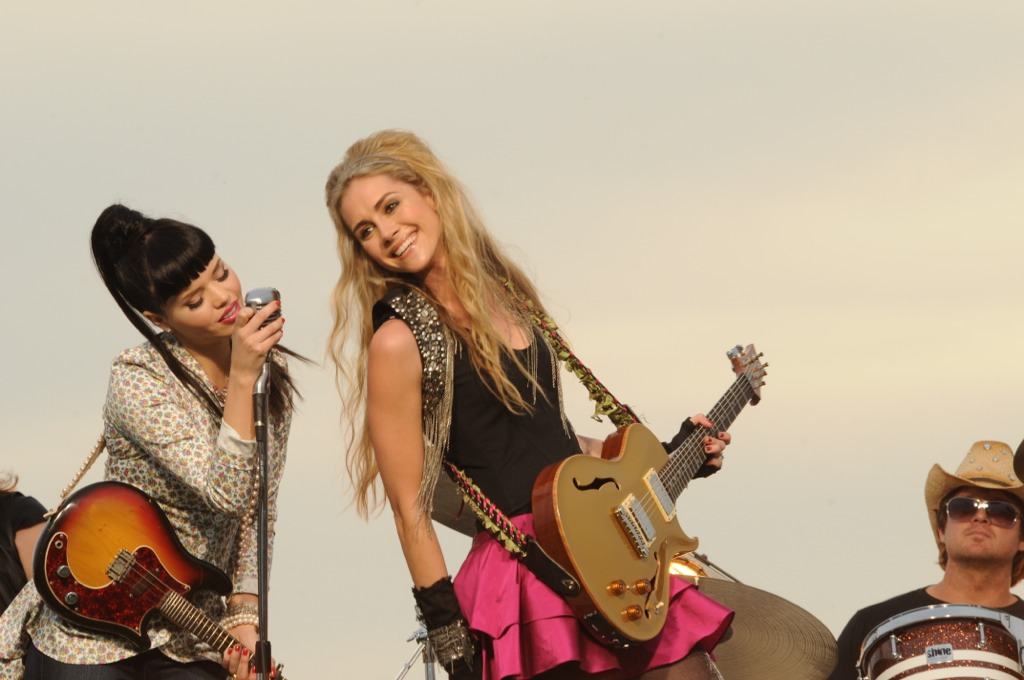
From left to right, Susie Brown and Danelle Leverett performing on the set for the "Wildflower" music video.

"Wildflower" was released as the album's lead single on April 26, 2010, and received "steady airplay" on country radio. the JaneDear Girls chose the song based on its composition and lyrics; Leverett explained that it best represented them as "independent females chasing a dream". Craig Shelburne of CMT praised the song as memorable, while Jonathan Keefe criticized it as unoriginal. the JaneDear Girls performed "Wildflower" on various late-night talk shows, including Jimmy Kimmel Live!, and the Country Radio Seminar. A music video, directed by Deaton Flanigen in Adams, Tennessee, was released on June 28, 2010. The video appeared in the Top 20 on the Great American Country television network. It was nominated for Duo Video of the Year at the 2011 Country Music Association Awards; Flanigen also received a nomination for Video Director of the Year partly due to his work on the visual. The JaneDear Girls were nominated for Single by a Breakthrough Artist Award during the 2011 American Country Awards. "Wildflower" peaked at number 60 on the Hot 100 chart on February 19, 2011, and stayed on the chart for eight weeks. For the 2011 Year End Country Songs chart, "Wildflower" ranked at number 71. Deborah Evans Price of Billboard wrote that the JaneDear Girls were considered a breakthrough act for 2011 based on the commercial success of "Wildflower".

"Shotgun Girl", the album's second single, was released on March 21, 2011. The duo picked the song after hearing positive feedback from friends within the music industry. Brown explained that it was chosen based on its radio appeal and how women could relate to it. Some music critics praised "Shotgun Girl" as ideal for the summer, though Jonathan Keefe called it an unsuccessful attempt at the arena rock sound of bands like Def Leppard. A music video was uploaded on June 15, 2011. Alanna Conway of Taste Of Country summarized the video as focused on cars and colors, praising it as having "plenty of entertaining moments that will captivate the audience throughout the song". Leverett viewed the video as "very performance driven", with an emphasis placed on the band. "Shotgun Girl" peaked at number 36 on the Hot Country Songs chart on June 18, 2011, and remained on the chart for 21 weeks.

"Merry Go Round", the third and final single from the album, was sent to country radio in August 2011. Bob Reeves, the vice president of Warner Music Nashville, said the song was the "overwhelming choice" following fans' response on social media and its digital sales. On the other hand, Billy Dukes questioned its appeal to country radio audiences, viewing its release as a risk; he explained: "'Merry Go Round' isn't safe, it isn't polite and it isn't how more urbane listeners think young ladies should behave." Despite these remarks, he praised the group for their unapologetic attitude. Grady Smith was also uncertain about the decision to promote the song as a single, and wrote that it would divide listeners through its use of Auto-Tune. Jonathan Keefe panned "Merry Go Round" as a poor attempt to recreate Big & Rich's 2004 single "Save a Horse (Ride a Cowboy)". On October 26, 2011, the JaneDear Girls uploaded a video to their YouTube account that taught a line dance to "Merry Go Round" and encouraged viewers to choreograph their own dances. A lyric video was released on the same day. "Merry Go Round" peaked at number 44 on the Hot Country Songs and the Hot Country airplay charts on November 26, 2011, and stayed on both for 16 weeks.

== Release and promotion ==
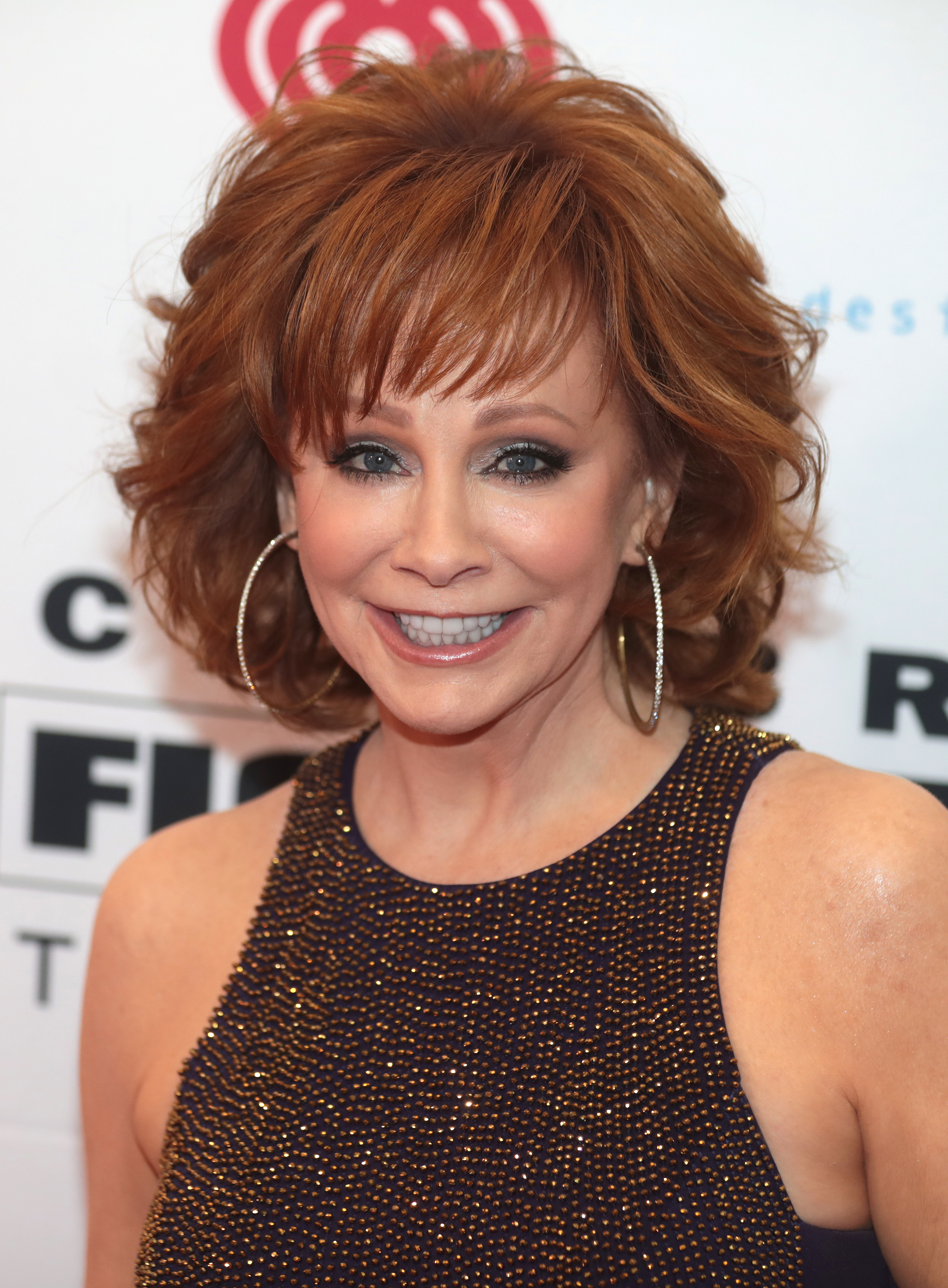
While promoting the album, the Jane Dear Girls performed with various artists, including Reba McEntire (pictured).

The JaneDear Girls was released on February 1, 2011, as a CD and a digital download. Stephen Thomas Erlewine described the album cover as relying on "va-va-voom glamour" as a marketing tactic. The JaneDear Girls peaked at number 46 on the Billboard 200 chart on February 19, 2011, and remained on the chart for seven weeks. It also reached number ten on the Top Country Albums chart on the same day, and stayed on the chart for 25 weeks. It sold 10,307 copies in its first week, and as of March 19, 2011, the album has sold 32,915 copies.

the JaneDear Girls performed as part of Jason Aldean's My Kinda Party tour, and on select dates for Brad Paisley's H2O II: Wetter and Wilder World tour. They also served as the opening act for Reba McEntire's concert; for their set, the duo sang primarily covers of country and rock music, such as Led Zeppelin's 1975 "Kashmir". Emily Burnham of the Bangor Daily News praised their performance as "a high energy start to the night", and McEntire called the duo "cute as a button".

On January 18, 2011, the group also performed at the Grand Ole Opry as part of the Academy of Country Music Awards, where they were nominated for Top New Vocal Duet or Group and Top Vocal Duo of the Year. the JaneDear Girls sang several songs, including "Wildflower", "Saturdays in September", and a cover of Pat Benatar's 1980 single "Hit Me with Your Best Shot", at the 2011 Country Music Association Awards. They also performed at the 2011 Montana State Fair, the Academy of Country Music event "Girls’ Night Out: Superstar Women of Country", and the Go Country 105 FM's 4th Anniversary Show.

They also performed "Wildflower" and "Shotgun Girl" at the opening of 2011 CMA Music Festival; during the set, Brown played a medley of Charlie Daniels' 1979 single "The Devil Went Down to Georgia" and Johnny Cash's 1938 song "Orange Blossom Special". Chris Parton of CMT praised the group for their energy and harmonies, while Matthew Keever of the Houston Press wrote that they had a polarizing effect on the crowd as either the best or worst act of the night. Keever had a mixed reaction to their performance, but responded positively to Brown's fiddle medley.

Along with the duo's live performances, the album was promoted further when the track "Sugar" was featured on a 30-second preview for the Desperate Housewives episode "Watch While I Revise the World". They also performed "Shotgun Girl" on the Hart of Dixie episode "Planksgiving". Peter Strickland, a senior vice president of brand management and sales for Warner Music Nashville, said the JaneDear Girls were marketed based on three concepts: "Visual, youthful and high-energy." The group also participated in a marketing campaign with MAC Cosmetics. To better connect with fans, Brown and Leverett posted weekly videos on their official website; the videos' topics ranged from songwriting, and fashion, to farming. Brown said these clips give "fans insight into our lives and what we love".

== Critical reception ==
Professional ratings
Aggregate scores
Source	Rating
Metacritic	56/100
Review scores
Source	Rating
AllMusic	3/5 stars
American Songwriter	3.5/5 stars
The New Zealand Herald	4/5 stars
Slant Magazine	1/5 stars

On Metacritic, The JaneDear Girls received a score of 56/100, which indicates a "mixed or average" response, based on four reviews. Roughstock's Matt Bjorke praised the duo's crossover appeal, describing the album as having "a more universal, melodic grove" after its first three tracks. For The New Zealand Herald, a reviewer believed the duo would appeal to an international country music audience along the same line as Taylor Swift; when describing the album's overall sound, the contributor wrote: "Think Swift wrapped in Winehouse with some leather-clad Rihanna thrown in for good measure." Citing the uptempo material as the album's highlights, Stephen Thomas Erlewine wrote that the duo "wind[s] up with appealingly glitzy, crisp country-pop". Eric Allen praised the JaneDear girls as "a breath of fresh air and a welcome addition to the current risk-averse and cynical musical climate". Jon Caramanica summed up the album as "brassy and chipper and fun".

The JaneDear Girls did receive some more mixed to negative responses. Allen questioned the album's appeal to "traditional country enthusiasts", while Bjorke wished the overall production was mellower. Erlewine criticized the ballads as "surg[ing] so strongly no emotion registers". Despite his praise for the duo's vocals and harmonies, Jeffrey B. Remz wished the album had more variety; he ended his review by saying: "A little less may have resulted in a lot more." Jessica Phillips of Country Weekly rated the album two-and-a-half stars out of five, dismissing most of the songs as "uninspired", though she praised Brown and Leverett's vocals. On the other hand, Jonathan Keefe wrote that the duo relied on costumes and melodies to cover up "the fact that they can’t sing even a little bit" and believed that they do not have "a single authentic thing to say".

== Aftermath ==
Following the album's release, the JaneDear Girls disbanded and were subsequently removed from the Warner Music Nashville roster. The duo's break-up was first announced in April 2012 through a promotional message from the organizers of the 8th International Dogwood Festival, where the duo had been booked as the headlining act. Prior to their disbandment, the JaneDear Girls released a cover of "Footloose" for the 2011 film of the same name and the 2012 original song "Good Girls Gone Bad" for the television show GCB. They were one of several musical acts that left Warner Music Nashville; a 2016 Billboard article reported that Blake Shelton and Frankie Ballard were the only two singers that remained with the label from when John Esposito became its chairman and CEO.

Following the split, Brown and Leverett pursued music careers as solo artists. Leverett recorded indie and pop music under the stage name Nelly Joy, and Brown continued to record country music. They released solo singles in August 2012. Leverett later joined the country band Gone West alongside her husband Jason Reeves, Colbie Caillat, and Justin Young. Billy Dukes wrote that the JaneDear Girls, like Bomshel and Miss Willie Brown, were an example of how some female duos were unable to find a "formula for success" in country music.

== Track listing ==
- Credits for the songs are taken from The JaneDear Girls album booklet. John Rich produced all of the songs.

No.	Title	Writer(s)	Length
1.	"Wildflower"	Susie Brown, Vicky McGehee, Jeremy Stover	2:43
2.	"Shotgun Girl"	Danelle Leverett, Deric Ruttan	3:24
3.	"Merry Go Round"	Leverett, Peter Amato, Oliver Leiber	3:15
4.	"Sugar"	Brown, Andy Gibson, John Kennedy	3:03
5.	"Saturdays in September"	Leverett, Brown, Tom Hambridge, Danny Myrick, Jeffrey Steele	3:53
6.	"Sing Along"	Leverett, Rune Westberg	3:03
7.	"Lucky You"	Leverett, Brown, Ruttan	3:12
8.	"Pretender"	Leverett, Brown, Myrick, Jeff Spence	3:52
9.	"Never Gonna Let You Go"	Leverett, Brown, Marcus Hummon	3:47
10.	"Free Ride"	Leverett, Jordan Lawhead, Jason Reeves	2:55
11.	"Every Day's a Holiday"	Leverett, Brown, Myrick	3:39
Total length:			36:46

iTunes Pre-Order & UK Amazon Bonus Track
No.	Title	Writer(s)	Length
12.	"Baby It's You"	Leverett, Brown, Myrick	2:58

== Credits and personnel ==
The following credits were adapted from the booklet of The JaneDear Girls and AllMusic:

- Paul "TFO" Allen – electric guitar
- Pete Amato – keyboards
- Kristin Barlowe – photography
- Ann Marie Boskovich – vocal harmony
- Steve Brewster – drums, percussion
- Mike Brignardello – bass
- Emma Brophy – vocal harmony
- Nick Brophy – engineer, electric guitar, keyboards, percussion, vocal producer
- Wesley-Kate Brophy – vocal harmony
- Susie Brown – fiddle, mandocaster, mandolin
- Adam Engelhardt – assistant
- P.J. Fenech – assistant
- Shannon Forrest – drums
- Andy Gibson – vocal harmony
- Lucy Halperin – make-up
- Clyde Haygood – hair stylist
- Marcus Hummon – acoustic guitar
- Oliver Leiber – percussion, programming
- Danelle Leverett – harmonica
- John Palmeri – assistant
- Mark Petaccia – assistant
- Ethan Pilzer – bass
- Bartley Pursley – engineer
- John Rich – producer
- Jeffrey Roach – Hammond B3, keyboards, piano
- Adam Shoenfeld – electric guitar
- Edward St. George – hair stylist
- Megan Thompson – make-up
- Ilya Toshinsky – banjo, acoustic guitar, electric guitar, mandolin, slide guitar
- Wah Wah – guitar
- Wanda Vick – Dobro, fiddle
- Rune Westberg – electric guitar, programming
- John Willis – acoustic guitar
- Glenn Worf – bass
- Nathan Yarborough – assistant
- Jonathan Yudkin – banjo, Dobro, fiddle, mandolin, string arrangements, strings

== Charts ==
=== Weekly charts ===
Chart (2011)	Peak position
US Billboard 200	46
US Top Country Albums (Billboard)	10

=== Year-end charts ===
Chart (2011)	Position
US Top Country Albums (Billboard)	75
