= What Could've Been =

2019 song by Gone West

Single by Gone West

from the album Canyons
- Released: June 7, 2019
- Genre: Country
- Length: 3:42
- Label: Thirty Tigers
- Songwriters: Colbie Caillat; Jamie Kenney; Jason Reeves; Justin Young; Nelly Joy
- Producer: Jamie Kenney

Music video
- "What Could've Been" on YouTube

"What Could've Been" is a song recorded by American country pop group Gone West. It was released on June 7, 2019 as the first single from their debut studio album Canyons. The song was written by group members Colbie Caillat, Jason Reeves, Justin Young, Nelly Joy and Jamie Kenney, and produced by Kenney.

== Background ==
Caillat, Jason Reeves, Young, Nelly Joy and Kenney shared the story behind the song with Country Now. Kenney told the band he had been listening to their EP in the shower, a "ritual" he has before writing songs. Nelly said: "Jamie had a melody and lyrics start to the chorus that we immediately loved. The song pieced together pretty quickly." Cobie: "The song is so special to all of us, we all feel a little bit of magic when we sing it together." Jason also said: "I think the message of the song is something that everyone can relate to, and it just brings a sense of emotion and nostalgia to the song that can be rare to find."

== Music video ==
The music video was uploaded on September 6, 2019. The band described the video to People.com as "a split-screen heartbreak story of a broken romance that could have turned out more favorably." The video also uses mirrors to show glimpses of "what could've been".

== Commercial performance ==
As of December 2019, the song has sold 21,000 copies in the United States.

== Charts ==
=== Weekly charts ===
Weekly chart performance for "What Could've Been"
| Chart (2019–2020) | Peak position |
|---|---|
| Canada Country (Billboard) | 50 |
| US Country Airplay (Billboard) | 27 |
| US Hot Country Songs (Billboard) | 34 |

=== Year-end charts ===
Year-end chart performance for "What Could've Been"
| Chart (2020) | Position |
|---|---|
| US Hot Country Songs (Billboard) | 77 |
