= Brendan James (album) =

Studio album by Brendan James
- Released: September 7, 2010
- Recorded: 2008–2010
- Studios: London, Los Angeles at Warren Huart's Studio Swing House.
- Genres: Rock, pop
- Length: 44:24 (Standard Version); 48:19 (iTunes Bonus Track); 48:21 (Amazon MP3 Exclusive)
- Label: Decca
- Producers: Warren Huart, David Ryan Harris, Boots Ottestad

Brendan James chronology
| The Day Is Brave (2008) | Brendan James (2010) | Hope in Transition (2012) |

Alternative cover
- Original Cover

Singles from Brendan James
- 1. "The Fall" Released: June 8, 2010; 2. "The Lucky Ones " Released: August 31, 2010

Brendan James is the second studio album by American singer-songwriter Brendan James, released on September 7, 2010. Brendan made his first-ever appearance on Billboard 200 after debuting at #93 on the chart, with the strong sales in digital, the self-titled album also broke into the Digital Albums chart at #21.

== Background ==
Some artists name an album after themselves because they are stumped for another title. Brendan James grins at this suggestion. "As a fellow musician, I definitely get that," Brendan says, "but I actually had a good reason to do it. The album is self-titled because I feel like it’s my first recording that really showcases the different sides of me as a musician. It’s got everything from the mellow to the upbeat, to the somber to the unashamedly positive. My friends know me as the guy who loves to jump in the middle of a pick-up basketball game, but they also know me as the guy who needs to be reminded to stop spiraling when I start thinking about something too deeply. I have a lot of different sides and I wanted to make sure my music reflected that."

== Production ==
A singer-songwriter who accompanies himself on piano, James began writing the songs on his second album after winding up a year and a half on the road in support of his debut album The Day Is Brave, which was released by Decca Records in June 2008 and debuted in the Top 10 on Billboard's Heatseekers chart. Several of its songs were featured on various television shows including Private Practice, Bones, So You Think You Can Dance, and Army Wives. After releasing the album, James hit the ground running to support it from coast to coast. "I went to 40 states, ate at 330 restaurants, stayed in 210 hotels, and slept on one boat – John Mayer’s Mayercraft Cruise; I know because I wrote it all down," James says with a laugh. The 18-month tour enabled James (whom Entertainment Weekly has called "A Songwriter on the Rise'") to build his fanbase the way many successful musicians have done before him: one room at a time, and he shares the fruits of that journey – renewed vigor, musical maturity, and even a new sound – on his second album.

The songs that I was trying to write were just a little bigger and the production I was aiming for was just a little more full and I think that’s the result of the album. I’m really proud of it; it’s a different direction for me in a way but I hope people hear the same guy behind the microphone and talking about the same things in his songs.

— Brendan James, Touring Brendan James Takes a Moment to Visit With DMX

When [the song] hits me, I have to find a piano quickly and get as much creativity out in that time span and then it leaves me, I can find inspiration anywhere, but I have to be at a piano to write.

— Brendan James,

== Music and lyrics ==
James and his producer Warren Huart (The Fray, Howie Day, Augustana) have emerged with an album that keeps the spotlight on James’ emotionally resonant voice and expressive piano playing. "First and foremost, it was important to me that the vocals and piano were up front," James says. "Warren made sure that was his first priority. When it comes to the recording process, he’s a traditionalist, which is important to me because though I want my albums to sound current, I also want them to stay true to who I am as an artist?"

"Aiding in delivering James' maturation as both writer and performer is producer Warren Huart (The Fray, Howie Day, Augustana), a skilled collaborator who obviously has a special gift in assembling uptempo mainstream pop tracks for mass consumption without sacrificing the earnest and serious-minded artistic center of each." —Direct Current Music

Hard to classify your own sound, especially when you feel it constantly changing under your feet. But I try to write full structured songs that make people feel. They’re usually based around my piano or keyboard playing, and production could be reminiscent of anything from an old paul simon track to a new mgmt track. That’s where the fun comes in I guess. People have said --which musicians LOVE hearing --"Oh, you sound like David Gray, James Taylor, or Zero7!" I take them all as compliments, and keep doing my thing. Ironically enough, I compare my style to a lot of the musicians who people tell me I could compare myself to. David Gray, James Taylor, The Fray, Elton John. I find it hard to be objective about my own sound. I guess if I didn’t have outside opinions, I’d probly just say I sound like me.

— Brendan James, Brendan James' New CD Is iTunes Chart Topper

== Promotion ==
James scores his national TV debut on CBS Saturday's Second Cup Café September 25 and is scheduled to tape a performance on The Rachel Ray Show in October

To coincide with the album release, Brendan continues his stint on the road with supporting popular pop band Parachute, John Legend and Grammy-winning singer Paula Cole, he will also co-headline concerts with Jason Reeves.

== Critical reception ==
The self-titled album has earned advance critical praises and positive reviews from most music critics.

"Finding that special not-too-sweet spot that lingers somewhere between hook-heavy, radio-friendly pop anthems and the art of critically credible, personal songwriting, Brendan James exudes a gracefully assured ease." "James' distinctly detached vocal delivery actually keeps the grander moments here in check, subtle cool shadings that keep the focus on the classic pop/rock melodies that burrow quickly into the subconscious. Highly recommended." —Direct Current Music

"If David Gray's "Babylon" burned a hole in your CD player, tune in to James's rich, vibrato-tinged croon, which straddles postadolescent ardor and grown-up love on his self-titled disc." —The Oprah Magazine

Andrew Leahey from AllMusic also gave the album a good review, saying "Produced by the same man who recorded The Fray's first two albums, the serf-titled Brendan James is full of pleasant piano pop, with nary an out-of-place note or flubbed chord in attendance. James is a natural assimilator, and both his songwriting and vocal delivery reference the likes of David Gray, James Taylor, and Coldplay. The result is a slick, lush album that splits the difference between adult contemporary and the sort of PG-rated pop that OneRepublic creates, with light electronics and computerized blips-and-bloops adding texture to the mix."

Dallas News gave the album a "B ^{+}" and says: "There's an old artistic soul musing beneath the 31-year-old body of this most engaging singer, songwriter and pianist. The 11 songs on Brendan James' self-titled second album nestle in a melodically soothing and lyrically thought-provoking bed that brings to mind classic pop singer-song- writers such as Carly Simon, Elton John and Billy Joel. James, particularly on tracks such as "Nothing for Granted," "The Fall," "Different Kind of Love" and "Emerald Sky," understands the heartfelt connection between adult emotions and indelible melodies. We get plenty of that here."

Philadelphia Daily News gave the album a "B" and says: "Do you like romantic-minded, life-lesson-sharing piano men? Billy, Elton, or that dude from Five for Fighting? If so, try on the self-titled set from Brendan James. His brutally honest kiss off "The Fall" and "Different Kind of Love" are especially good fits."

"James plays toward his strengths with heartfelt ballads like "The Fall" and "Different Kind of Love." But he also stretches his musical wings. The quirky "Stupid for Your Love," is a smart, jaunty tune that shows a John Lennon-esque love of word play, and James gets an assist from The Fray in "Anything For You." Two other songs address the challenges --- including the wars abroad, violence at home and economic uncertainty --- faced by members of the so-called Millennial generation." —Waterloo-Cedar Falls Courier

"If men ticklin’ ivory keys while croonin’ about lost love (i.e.: David Gray or Damien Rice) is more your speed then check out Brendan James. Named a "songwriter on the rise" by Entertainment Weekly, and "the next best thing" by Page Six, Brendan James is definitely someone you'll be hearing more from in the coming months."—Fabulis

"... the breezy pop love songs on Brendan James will make you positively stupid for his love."—Blurt! Magazine

"And his album is quite an achievement. With intricate, well-written and performed pop songs, the album feels like the soundtrack to your own life, with the heartaches, the triumphs, trials and everything in between. You get the sense that this man is real, and not in one bit changed by his growing fame." —Static Multimedia

"Pop singer-pianist Brendan James has a good way of expressing the profound in everyday level. On his eponymous second album, he talks in common terms about blocked or bettered relations and dealing with the reality of lfe and love. There are not songs that will become standards, but, like james' easygoing tenor, there are consistently easyto listen to." —Pittsburgh Tribune-Review

== Commercial performance ==
Brendan James debuted at #93 on Billboard 200, making his first-ever appearance on the chart, the album also debuted at #21 on Digital Albums chart, thanks to the strong album sales in digital.

== Uses in media ==
- "The Lucky Ones" can be heard in the trailer for the Columbia Pictures release, How Do You Know, starring by Reese Witherspoon, Owen Wilson, Paul Rudd and Jack Nicholson.
- "Your Beating Heart" was the closing song on in the season 8's episode "The Space in Between" of The CW’s long-running hit show One Tree Hill, this song was also included in the charity compilation album for the 2011 Tōhoku earthquake and tsunami "Songs of Love for Japan".
- "Changing Us" was using as a background song in the season 8's episode "Quiet Little Voices" of The CW’s long-running hit show One Tree Hill.
- "Nothing For Granted" is played in a Golf Channel commercial

== Track listing ==
All 11 songs were written and co-written by Brendan James and produced by his long-time producer Warren Huart, except track 4 and track 7. An exclusive iTunes Bonus Track Version of the album includes additional bonus track "Coming Up", and a digital booklet.

| No. | Title | Writer(s) | Producer(s) | Length |
|---|---|---|---|---|
| 1. | "Nothing For Granted" | Brendan James, Chris Lindsey | Warren Huart | 4:13 |
| 2. | "The Fall" | Brendan James, Kevin Griffin | Warren Huart | 4:24 |
| 3. | "Anything For You" | Brendan James, Eric Rosse | Warren Huart | 3:45 |
| 4. | "The Lucky Ones" | Brendan James, David Ryan Harris | David Ryan Harris | 3:57 |
| 5. | "Stupid For Your Love" | Brendan James | Warren Huart | 4:04 |
| 6. | "Different Kind Of Love" | Brendan James | Warren Huart | 4:08 |
| 7. | "Get It Right" | Brendan James, Boots Ottestad | Boots Ottestad and Warren Huart | 3:45 |
| 8. | "Changing Us" | Brendan James | Warren Huart | 4:30 |
| 9. | "Let It Rain" | Brendan James, E. Kidd Bogart, Greg Ogan | Warren Huart | 4:13 |
| 10. | "Your Beating Heart" | Brendan James | Warren Huart | 3:03 |
| 11. | "Emerald Sky" | Brendan James, Chris Seefried | Warren Huart | 4:22 |
| 12. | "Coming Up" (Track 12 iTunes Bonus Track) | Brendan James, Stephen Sulikowski | Stephen Sulikowski | (3:55) |
| 13. | "More Than This" (Track 12 Amazon MP3 Exclusive) | Brendan James | Warren Huart | (3:57) |
| Total length: | | | | 44:24 |

== Personnel ==
=== Performers ===
- Ben Phillips – Drums
- Ben Wysocki – Drums
- Boots Ottestad – Bass, Guitar, Keyboards, Background Vocals
- Brendan James – Vocals, Piano, Drums, Background Vocals
- Brent Price – Violin
- Dan Rothchild – Bass, Bass Moog
- David Levita – Electric guitar
- Dave Welsh – Electric guitar
- Johnny Haro – Drums
- Megan Allison – Violin
- Norbert Lewendowski – Cello
- Sean Hurley – Bass
- Simon Ertz – Viola
- Stephen Sulikowski – Acoustic guitar, Electric guitar, Bass, Background Vocals
- Tim Pierce – Electric guitar
- Victor Indrizzo – Drums, Percussion
- Warren Huart – Bass, Acoustic guitar, Electric guitar
- Zac Rae – Keyboards

=== Technical ===
- Adam Ayan – Mastering
- David Chertock – Engineer
- Joe Zook – Mixing
- Ken Eisennagel – Digital Editing
- Paul Hart – Assistant Engineer, Digital Editing
- Phil Allen – Additional Engineering
- Robin Holden – Engineer, Digital Editing,
- Warren Huart – Engineer, Producer, Mixing

=== Design ===
- James Minchin III – Photography
- Rebecca Meek – Package Design

== Charts ==
| Chart (2010) | Peak position |
|---|---|
| U.S. Billboard 200 | 93 |
| U.S. Digital Albums | 21 |
| U.S. Rock Albums | 33 |

== Release history ==
| Country | Date | Format | UPC |
|---|---|---|---|
| United States | September 7, 2010 | Digital Download, CD | 00602527394381 |
