= Wildflower (The JaneDear Girls song) =

Single by the JaneDear Girls

from the album The JaneDear Girls
- Released: April 26, 2010
- Genre: Country
- Length: 2:44
- Label: Warner Bros. Nashville; Reprise Nashville
- Songwriters: Susie Brown; Vicky McGehee; Jeremy Stover
- Producer: John Rich

The JaneDear Girls singles chronology
"Wildflower" (2010)	"Shotgun Girl" (2011)

Music video
- "Wildflower" at CMT.com

"Wildflower" is a song written by Susie Brown, Jeremy Stover and Vicky McGehee, and recorded by American country music duo the JaneDear Girls. It was released on April 26, 2010, as the lead-off single from their self-titled debut album, which was released on February 1, 2011.

== Content ==
"Wildflower" is an up-tempo country song, backed by electric guitar, banjo, and mandolin, with a fiddle bridge. The song's female narrators describe being raised in the country and use the term 'wildflower' as a metaphor for this method of upbringing ("Hey I'm a wildflower growing in the sunshine / Soaking up the way of life I was raised in").

== Critical reception ==
Bobby Peacock of Roughstock gave the single four stars out of five, calling it "an excellent choice for a debut single." He also favorably described them as having "strong, sassy voices that harmonize well without seeming calculated or overblown."

== Commercial performance ==
"Wildflower" peaked at number 60 on the Billboard Hot 100 chart on February 19, 2011, and stayed on the chart for eight weeks. On February 12, 2011, it reached number 15 on the Hot Country Songs and the Country Airplay charts, and remained on both for 43 weeks. For the Country Digital Song Sales chart, "Wildflower" peaked at number seven on February 19, 2011, and remained on the chart for 11 weeks. It also reached number 60 on the Hot 100 Airplay (Radio Songs) chart on March 5, 2011, and stayed on the chart for seven weeks. The single peaked at number 61 on the Digital Songs chart on February 19, 2011, and remained there for one week. For the 2011 Year End Country Songs Billboard chart, "Wildflower" ranked at number 71. Due to the commercial success of "Wildflower", Deborah Evans Price of Billboard wrote that the JaneDear girls were considered a breakthrough act for 2011.

== Music video ==
The music video, directed by Deaton-Flanigen Productions, premiered on CMT on June 14, 2010. In the video, The JaneDear Girls are shown pulling up to a farm in a pickup truck and proceeding to wash their truck as male farm hands move bales of hay. They soon coax the boys into washing it for them while they sit in lawn chairs and observe. They are then shown in a girl's bedroom getting dressed and putting on makeup. Additionally, throughout the video the duo is shown performing and playing their instruments on stage and in a field of wildflowers.

== Charts ==
=== Weekly charts ===
Chart (2010–2011)	Peak position
US Billboard Hot 100	60
US Hot Country Songs (Billboard)	15

=== Year-end charts ===
Chart (2011)	Position
US Hot Country Songs (Billboard)	71
