= Green (Brendan James song) =

Single by Brendan James

from the album The Day Is Brave
- Released: May 20, 2008
- Genre: Pop, Rock
- Length: 3:50
- Label: Decca Records
- Songwriter(s): Brendan James
- Producer(s): Mikal Blue

Brendan James singles chronology
"Green" (2008)	"The Fall" (2010)

"Green" is the lead single by the American singer-songwriter Brendan James, from his first studio album The Day Is Brave. The song has been featured in the Lifetime's hit show, Army Wives.

== Background ==
The song is about a former girlfriend he met while working at Urban Outfitters. "She was just a really special girl," Brendan said, "and after we broke up, I looked back and realized she was always wearing green."

There's a bit of a story behind it and I tell it when I sing it live. I can tell you that when I lived in New York, I had to get a job at Urban Outfitters to pay the bills. Andrea, who the song is about, is the girl I met there and the more I got to know her, the more I came to admire her for her strength and what she had been through in her own life up to that point. It was a very emotional, passionate relationship. It ended with a few things left on my mind. One of them was that she wore the color green every day of her life. I never knew why but it was her comfort, you know?

— Brendan James,

== Music video ==
The music video for "Green" was directed by Josh Franer. In the video, Brendan's driving in a car (70 Mercury Cougar owned by Stuart Nembrotti) and passing through from place to place where he and his girlfriend were met, and recalling the girl he used to love and the things they've been through.

== Reception ==
The song has received positive review from Entertainmentopia.
“Green" picks up a faster, more energetic tempo, leaving the remaining cuts in the doldrums of slow, sometimes plodding, yet melodic music. -Entertainmentopia
