= Hearts Are Magnets =

EP by Jason Reeves
- Released: February 14, 2006
- Recorded: 2005
- Studio: Revolver Recordings, Westlake Village, California
- Genre: Alternative rock, singer-songwriter, folk
- Length: 29:17
- Label: Dancing Squirrel
- Producer: Mikal Blue, Curt Schneider

Jason Reeves chronology
Hearts Are Magnets (2006)	Patience For The Waiting (2009)

Hearts Are Magnets is the first EP of singer-songwriter Jason Reeves and his first published work with producer Mikal Blue. It was self-released in the US on February 14, 2006.

== History ==
Hearts Are Magnets is the fourth overall release of artist Jason Reeves. After briefly attending college, Reeves kept pursuing music in his native Iowa City, Iowa and self-released three albums. Two of these albums, Makeshift Aircraft (2003) and The Nervous Mind Of Love (2004) were sold through online store cdbaby.com and at his shows. Record producer Mikal Blue discovered these albums through his manager, Anna Rambeau, whom herself found the CDs through cdbaby. Blue was interested in working with Reeves and invited him to California to record with him in his studio. Working in Blue's studio, Reeves, Blue and another producer, Curt Schneider, assembled what eventually became the EP Hearts Are Magnets.

== Track listing ==
All songs written by Jason Reeves, except for "Pretty Eyes" which was written by Jason Reeves/Mikal Blue/Curt Schneider.

No.	Title	Length
1.	"Photographs & Memories"	5:31
2.	"Pretty Eyes"	4:37
3.	"Gasoline"	3:52
4.	"Honestly"	4:05
5.	"The Sun Shines On Everything"	4:13
6.	"Makeshift Aircraft"	5:15
7.	"Photographs & Memories (acoustic)"	1:44

== Personnel ==
Musicians

- Jason Reeves – vocals, acoustic guitar
- Curt Schneider – bass, vocals
- Mikal Blue – piano, guitar, vocals
- Tim Meyers – piano (1, 7)
- Andrew Williams – guitar (4, 5, 6)
- David Levita – guitar, flute (2, 3)
- Colbie Caillat – background vocals (5)
- Brian MacLeod – drums (2, 3)
- Victor Indrizzo – drums (4, 6)
- Chase Duddy – drums (5)
- David Salinas – drums (1)
- Dave Morada – bass (1)

Production

- Mikal Blue – producer
- Curt Schneider – producer
- Jason Reeves – photography
- Julie Whitten – photography
- Tyler Monks – engineer, photography
- Colbie Caillat – photography
