= Kevin Hammond (singer-songwriter) =

American singer-songwriter (born 1985)

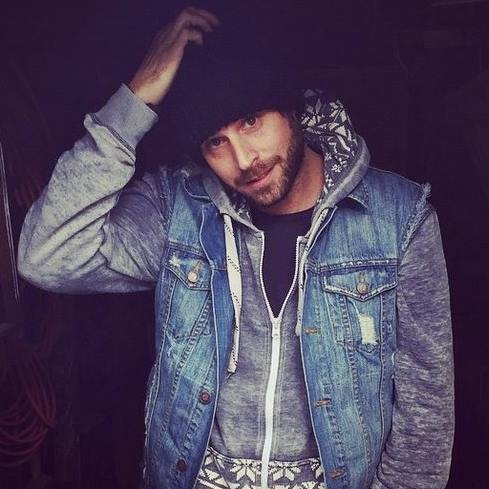
- Kevin Hammond in Pennsylvania, 2017
- Born: Kevin Richard Hammond; February 7, 1985 (age 41); Kenosha, Wisconsin, United States
- Occupations: Musician; singer-songwriter
- Spouse: Jazmyn Engelhardt (m. 2011)
- Musical career
- Instruments: Vocals; piano; guitar; keyboards
- Years active: 2008–present
- Labels: A&M Octone Records

Kevin Richard Hammond (born February 7, 1985) is an American singer-songwriter. His debut EP 'Kevin Hammond' peaked at #34 on Billboard's Heat Seekers album charts on December 5, 2009, also placing 7th in the West North Central region and 10th in the Mountain region. Hammond is known musically for his ability to seamlessly switch between a high falsetto and a full-bodied vocal register.

== Early life ==
Born in Kenosha, Wisconsin to Richard and Carolyn, Hammond is the third of seven children. Father Richard Hammond is credited as being Hammond's earliest musical influence. Hammond experimented with many of his fathers instruments throughout childhood. At the age of 12, Hammond began recording his own music in his basement on his fathers 8-track reel-to-reel. Listening to his vocals on repeat with the reel-to-reel is how Hammond self-trained his voice.

== Music career ==
Prior to being signed to New York's A&M Octone Records, Hammond came into contact with English music producer Mikal Blue (best known for his work with Colbie Caillat, Jason Mraz, and OneRepublic) via Myspace social network. Blue flew Hammond out to Los Angeles and recorded several of Hammond's original acoustic songs at Revolver Recordings in Thousand Oaks, California, after which he signed with the recording company.

During his years at A&M/Octone Records, Hammond toured with many well-known artists including The Script, Paper Tongues, Natasha Bedingfield, Colbie Caillat, Gregg Allman, Andy Grammer, and Kate Voegele. In 2011, Hammond held a residency in NYC playing at venues such as The Bitter End and Rockwood Music Hall. Hammond was also featured in the line up at the legendary Bonnaroo Music Festival in Manchester, Tennessee.

=== 2009: 'Kevin Hammond' EP ===
In 2009, Hammond released his first EP. The EP was first released as 5 digital tracks, and later was available on disc. The tracks included 4 of Hammond's original demo songs. The EP also featured a cover of Gnarls Barkley's Crazy.

In 2010, Hammond's song "Just Believe It", as produced by American bassist and record producer Randy Jackson, was featured on the soundtrack for the Walmart made-for-TV film Secrets of the Mountain.

=== 2011: 'One of a Kind' Album ===
In 2011, Hammond released his first single titled "Broken Down" off of his debut album One of a Kind. The music video for the single was directed by Tim Nackashi and features The Vampire Diaries co-star Kat Graham. To promote the album, Hammond performed an exclusive concert for Z100 listeners at Planet Hollywood in Times Square.

== Personal life ==
On August 26, 2011, Hammond married former CW television host, Jazmyn Engelhardt, in a private ceremony.

== Discography ==
=== Extended plays ===
| Title | Year | Details |
|---|---|---|
| Kevin Hammond EP | 2009 | Label: A&M Octone Records; Formats: CD; Duration: 15:52; 5 tracks: 'Just As I Thought' [Early Recordings]; 'Broken Down' [Early Recordings]; 'The Way You Move'; 'What Would You Do For Love'; 'Crazy' [As originally performed by Gnarls Barkley] |
| Kevin Hammond – EP | 2011 | Label: A&M Octone Records; Formats: CD, Digital download; 5 tracks: 'Just as I Thought'; 'Broken Down'; 'What Would You Do For Love'; 'The Way You Move'; 'The Note' |

=== Soundtracks ===
| Song title | Year | Details |
|---|---|---|
| Just Believe It | 2010 | Label: A&M Octone Records; Format: CD, Digital download; Produced by: Randy Jackson; Soundtrack: Secrets of the Mountain |
