= The Fall (Brendan James song) =

Single by Brendan James

from the album Brendan James
- Released: June 8, 2010
- Genre: Pop
- Length: 4:24
- Label: Decca
- Songwriters: Brendan James, Kevin Griffin
- Producer: Warren Huart

Brendan James singles chronology
"Green" (2008)	"The Fall" (2010)	"The Lucky Ones" (2010)

Alternative cover
- iTunes Cover

"The Fall" is the lead single by American singer/songwriter Brendan James, from his self-titled sophomore studio album, Brendan James.

== Background ==
"The Fall", which James wrote about having to let someone go with the knowledge that the freedom of letting them go is the most grounding feeling of all.

I have tried to write a little more abstractly, but I just can’t. You are what you are and my heart is on my sleeve. I am a romantic as well as an optimist. I also go through my daily life thinking too hard about certain things. Stuff doesn’t roll off of me that easily. So I think my songs have this heaviness meets romance meets positivity.

— Brendan James,

It's kind of a song that I pulled from a collection of my own my experiences, as well as knowing people who have been throung the exactly same thing, is that hard moment when you in a relationship, you need to take a break, you know, sometimes that break is three months, sometimes is a year to, sometimes it is never ending, you know, sometimes you never find common ground again, the song is about that hard space.

— Brendan James

== Music video ==
Brendan and Melissa kissing in the video of "The Fall"

The video for "The Fall" was starred by American actress and model Melissa Ordway along with Greek's Amber Stevens and Miss South Carolina Jamie Hill, and was directed by Melissa's boyfriend, American actor Justin Baldoni. The music video was premiered on August 9 on multi-websites.

== Reception ==
=== Critical response ===
The song has received positive reviews from most music critics.
"His latest single, "The Fall" from his recently released self-titled album, is a nice song to ease into the new season (since it is all about postponing love until the fall). So give it a whirl, we’re pretty sure you’ll be humming it the rest of the afternoon." —Fabulis
"The beautiful piano-driven song is all about finding solace in letting someone go and the video for "The Fall" is a literal visual representation of Mr. James’ poignant lyrics with flashes of the singer in performance mode at the piano." —The Round Table Online
""The Fall" shows off James’ ability to craft touching, relatable lyrics that complement his strong vocals and piano playing. Try not to cry watching the video. Really." —Bloginity.
"The Fray-ish lead single "The Fall", we're just scratching the radiant surface of an album that delivers in full on every promise made." —Direct Current Music
"...understands the heartfelt connection between adult emotions and indelible melodies. We get plenty of that here" —Dallas News
"His brutally honest kiss off "The Fall" and "Different Kind of Love" are especially good fits." —Philadelphia Daily News
"James plays toward his strengths with heartfelt ballads like "The Fall". —WCF Courier
