= The Day Is Brave =

Studio album by Brendan James
- Released: June 3, 2008
- Recorded: 2007–2008
- Genres: Pop, rock, adult contemporary
- Length: 42:38
- Label: Decca
- Producers: Curt Schneider, Mikal Blue

Brendan James chronology
The Ballroom Break In (2008)	The Day Is Brave (2008)	Brendan James (2010)

Singles from Green
- 1. "Green" Released: May 20, 2008; 2. "Take the Fall" Released: 2008

The Day Is Brave is the debut studio album by American singer-songwriter Brendan James. It was released on June 3, 2008. The album is an extension of his previous four-song EP The Ballroom Break In which released in 2007.

The Album has received rave reviews from the media and had some of its songs featured on various television shows. With the success of his debut, Entertainment Weekly named Brendan James "Guys on the Rise: 8 rising singer-songwriters" and American singer-songwriter Carly Simon described Brendan James as "A voice that can change the world".

== Background ==
"It's just been a journey for me since I was 19, and just practicing for hours and hours. And to really decide that I want to do this has taken a lot of work. The title really speaks about the journey, because it wasn’t easy." -Brendan James

It's the melody that comes through, sitting on the piano, humming along and not really putting words to it yet. I kind of think about what I have wanted to write about at that time and the moods that I'm in. Lyrics are always last... my best song happens to be written about personal experience – whether to me, my friends, my family. In some instances, I get my writing from a broader sense.

— Brendan James,

There wasn't anything really specific, other than just being a person in this country who does watch TV and movies, and reads newspapers and magazine. It's pretty much all around me, the content and talk of the war. I guess I was just sitting at the piano and it started to come out of me. It's been in my face for so many years. One of the things that I kept seeing on CNN and everything was all of the coverage of political battles going on instead of how hard it is to be a soldier. Instead of actually thinking of what the soldiers are going through. I tried to highlight their struggle in the song.

— Brendan James,

In 2007, when paralyzed Iraq War veteran Tomas Young happened across Brendan's music on iTunes. Tomas handpicked Brendan's ballad "Hero's Song" —a piano-driven anthem about war from a soldier's perspective—to appear, alongside tracks by Neil Young and Bruce Springsteen, on the Eddie Vedder's soundtrack Body of War: Songs that Inspired an Iraq War Veteran, a documentary about Tomas's experience.

I never knew that I would write a song about the war. It just started to come out of me one day at the piano. It's not about Democrats or Republicans or who thinks what; it's really just about how hard it must be to be a soldier in this specific war. In a war that the entire world has criticized from day one.

— Brendan James

His process starts at the piano where he tries to find melodic ideas that inspire him, which slowly develop to how the song sounds to him and what the tone makes him feel until the topic follows, lyrics coming last. As many people have been, Tomas Young, the former soldier behind the original Body of War soundtrack was drawn to the song and its emotional message.

== Influence and comparison ==
Brendan started songwriting the summer between his Freshman and Second year at University of North Carolina – Chapel Hill, but rather than the same mountains that surrounded one of his greatest influences, James Taylor, it was a music teacher from his home town in Derry, New Hampshire that started him on his path.

"Influenced by the understated simplicity of the Carly Simon, James Taylor, and Carole King records he grew up with, James knew he wanted his debut to sound natural and unaffected" -Monsters and Critics

"...he was also in good musical company in The Big Apple. It is the famed locale for singer songwriters, from Neil Diamond, Paul Simon and Carly Simon herself, all emerged from that city." -She Knows Entertainment

"With his songs based more around the lyrics and the atmosphere they create rather than reading sheet music or studying classical musicians it’s easy to draw comparisons between Brendan and other piano-playing crooners that he idolizes like Elton John and Billy Joel. Brendan’s style steers further from pop than these two legends in his debut album, The Day is Brave. -Static Multimedia

"He sings with a British lilt, a curious choice that draws parallels to David Gray but fails to replicate that songwriter's power...." -AllMusic

"A little more diversity would have been nice to hear, and even when he tries to mix it up, such as in what I would consider his Elton Johnish "The Other Side," it still does not go to any extremes.... His songwriting is more attuned to a Billy Joel or Elton, but his voice would meld more nicely with the chords of an acoustic guitar." -Popstars Plus

"To compare him with some other isn't that hard. I would say that is really fair to compare him to heroes like James Taylor, Five For Fighting and even Carole King." -Melodic

All of the singer-songwriters, and the way they married their lyrics and their phrasing with their instrumentation. I listen to James Taylor and Bob Dylan... Stevie Wonder. I listen to Ryan Adams, Band of Horses... and then I start to think about my second album!

— Brendan James,

== Track listing ==
The Day Is Brave

#	Title
1.	"Green" 3:50
2.	"All I Can See " 3:59
3.	"Hero's Song" 4:12
4.	"Early April Morning" 3:52
5.	"The Other Side" 5:02
6.	"Run Away" 4:30
7.	"Begin" 1:52
8.	"The Sun Will Rise" 3:47
9.	"Manchester" 4:17
10.	"Let Your Beat Go On" 4:19
11.	"Take the Fall" 3:15
12.	"Dirty Living" (iTunes Bonus Track) 3:13

== Uses in media ==
- "Green" has been featured in the Lifetime's hit show, Army Wives, in the episode "Loyalties"
- "The Sun Will Rise" has been featured in the hit ABC show Private Practice season one's final episode "In Which Dell Finds His Fight" of 2007 and the episode "The Bone That Blew" in the Fox series Bones.
- "All I Can See" appeared on So You Think You Can Dance, aired on July 31, 2008.
- "Hero's Song" featured on the soundtrack album Body of War: Songs that Inspired an Iraq War Veteran.

== Critical reception ==
Professional ratings
Review scores
Source	Rating
Allmusic	2.5/5 stars
Entertainmentopia	Grade B−
Melodic	4/5 stars

The Day Is Brave has received generally positive reviews from most music critics.

Andrew Leahey from AllMusic: "James' debut would find a welcome home in a sorority girl's dorm room or a Starbucks coffee shop, where those wishing to sip a venti Frappuccino while absentmindedly tapping their feet might find this to be perfect background music. Shine a light on Brendan James' songcraft, though, and you'll see that it's too gauzy to hold up much weight on its own, regardless of the singer's good intentions."

"...a grounded, insightful and deeply talented individual the world is about to discover." -She Knows Entertainment

"There is something very "nice" and reassuring about his voice. It has that special quality you hear in some of the big name stars, although I do wish he would try to hit that high note – or even the low note, especially when the song or background instruments call for it." -Popstars Plus

“His compelling lyrics, soothing tenor and piano virtuosity make this debut album a stunning listen." -Newsweek

"For fans of confessional acoustics, a la James Taylor, Grant Lee Phillips, or even an XY-chromosomed Colbie Caillat, topped with nougaty piano flourishes." -Entertainment Weekly

"As you listen to The Day is Brave you’re relaxed as James’ voice shifts you into a tranquil mood, accompanied by masterful piano work, you drift off and take in the sound. Its almost as though you’re being smoothly hypnotized, but the album never breaks out with that sudden hit, that energy you are looking for to change your mood, change your feelings, make you feel something else besides being in a perpetual state and completely static." -Entertainmentopia

"With his warm, rich tenor and emotionally powerful songs, Brendan James announces himself as an artist-to-watch on his dazzling debut album The Day Is Brave. Rooted in the classic singer-songwriter tradition, with its introspective lyrics and unforgettable melodies, the album is 11 tracks of stunning songcraft: elegant, earthy, and displaying a total lack of artifice that is rare in the pop world these days." -Monstersand Critics

"This debut album from singer songwriter Brendan James is not exception with a very well written and beautiful album. Actually it feels like the perfect record to play on a warm night with the one you like with a nice sophisticated and passionate sound" -Melodic

"With his songs based more around the lyrics and the atmosphere they create rather than reading sheet music or studying classical musicians it’s easy to draw comparisons between Brendan and other piano-playing crooners that he idolizes like Elton John and Billy Joel. Brendan’s style steers further from pop than these two legends in his debut album, The Day is Brave. -Static Multimedia

== Commercial performance ==
Chart (2008–2009)	Peak position
U.S. Heatseekers chart	9

== Album credits ==
Performance credits

- Brendan James – Vocals, Guitar, Piano Organ, Percussion, Strings, drums, Keyboards, Mellotron
- Victor Indrizzo – Percussion, drums
- Brian MacLeod – Percussion, drums
- Curt Schneider – Bass, Percussion, Strings, drums, Keyboards
- Corky James – Guitar
- David Levita – Guitar
- Blair Sinta – Percussion, drums
- Mikal Blue – Organ, Bass, Guitar, Strings, Keyboards
- Chris Higginbottom – Percussion, drums
- Brian Macleod – Percussion, drums

Technical credits

- Billy Mann – Composer
- Tony Bruno – Composer
- Curt Schneider – record producer
- Mikal Blue – record producer, engineer
- Brendan James – Composer, arranger
- Benjamin Singer – Executive Producer

== Release history ==
Country	Date	UPC
United States	June 3, 2008	602517627185
