= The Lovesick =

Studio album by Jason Reeves
- Released: August 16, 2011
- Recorded: 2010
- Studio: The Evil 8-Bit Robot Factory, Nashville, Tennessee
- Genre: Rock, pop, alternative
- Length: 43:42
- Label: abeautifularmyoftrees
- Producer: Adam B Smith

Jason Reeves chronology
The Magnificent Adventures of Heartache (2008)	The Lovesick (2011)

Singles from The Lovesick
- 1. "Helium Hearts" Released: July 27, 2010; 2. "Sticks and Stones" Released: July 26, 2011

The Lovesick is the fifth studio album by American singer-songwriter and musician Jason Reeves, self-released on August 16, 2011, on the label abeautifularmyoftrees in the United States. Recording and production for the album took place during early 2010 at The Evil 8-Bit Robot Factory recording studio in Nashville, Tennessee with producer Adam Smith.

== Background ==
The Lovesick started production while Reeves was still under Warner Bros. Records in early 2010. The album was recorded in Nashville, TN at The Evil 8-bit Robot Factory. The studio owned by producer Adam B Smith and featured songs co-written with Danelle Leverett (one half of country duo The JaneDear Girls), Makana Rowan and Jordan Lawhead. Other collaborations include vocals from Colbie Caillat and Kara DioGuardi. The album's first single, "Helium Hearts," was released on July 27, 2010, by Warner Bros. Records. "Helium Hearts" was released with a music video and featured single cover art drawn by Reeves.

After the release of the "Helium Hearts" single, Reeves was dropped from the Warner Bros. Record label. He was allowed to keep the master tapes of the album which allowed him to later self-release the album. The second single "Sticks and Stones" was released on July 26, 2011, an entire year after the previous single. The album release of The Lovesick followed a month later on August 16, 2011. The album's cover and liner notes featured art and photography by Reeves.

== Track listing ==
No.	Title	Writer(s)	Length
1.	"Helium Hearts"	Jason Reeves, Danelle Leverett, Makana Rowan	4:08
2.	"Simple Song"	Reeves	3:07
3.	"Save My Heart"	Reeves, Leverett, Rowan, Adam B Smith	3:44
4.	"Infinity to One"	Reeves, Rowan	3:40
5.	"Sticks & Stones"	Reeves, Leverett, Lawhead	3:28
6.	"No Lies" (featuring Colbie Caillat)	Reeves, Leverett, Lawhead	4:12
7.	"Only with You"	Reeves, Rowan	3:28
8.	"Always Want More"	Reeves, Lawhead	3:37
9.	"No One Ever Taught Us" (featuring Kara DioGuardi)	Reeves, Lawhead	4:01
10.	"Alone"	Reeves, Rowan	4:35
11.	"Truth"	Reeves, Leverett, Rowan	5:42

== Personnel ==
Primary musicians

- Jason Reeves – acoustic guitar, vocals
- Adam B Smith – drums, bass, pianos, keyboards, programming, bells, vocals
- Jordan Lawhead – acoustic guitar, electric guitar, vocals (5, 6, 8, 9)

Additional musicians

- Colbie Caillat – vocals (6)
- Kara DioGuardi – vocals (9)
- Danelle Leverett – vocals (1, 4, 5)
- Mike Payne – electric guitar (1, 4, 7)
- Cara Slaybaugh – cello (11)

Production personnel

- Adam B Smith – producer, engineer, mixer
- Mark Endert – mixer
- Serban Ghenea – mixer
- John Hanes – engineer
- Tim Roberts – assistant engineer
- Joe Zook – mixer
- Ted Jensen – mastering
- Jason Reeves –photography, artwork
- Josh Newton – photography
- Makana Rowan – photography

== Charts ==
Chart (2011)	Peak position
US Heatseekers Albums (Billboard)	7
US Independent Albums (Billboard)	37
