= Gone West =

American country pop group

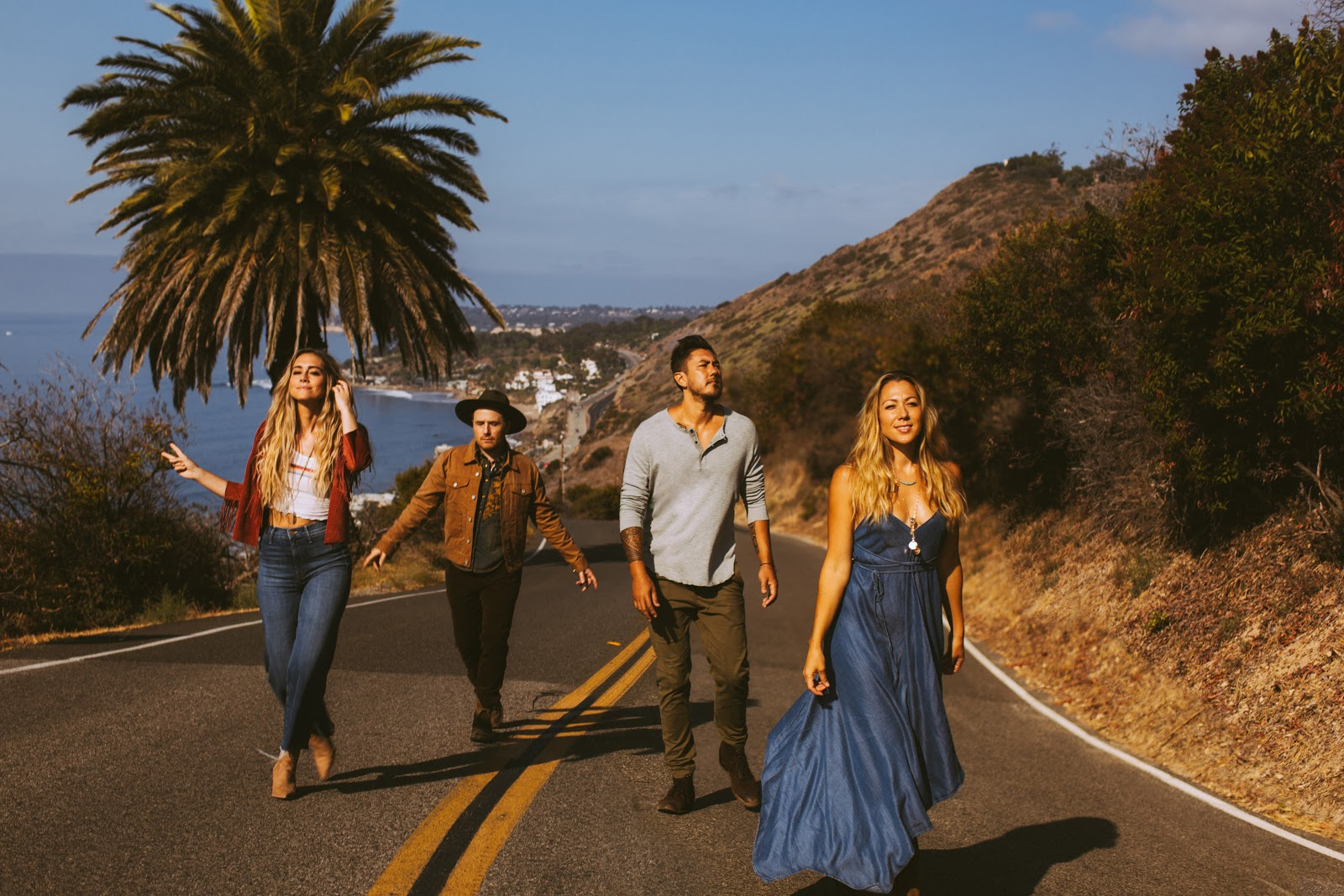

Background information
- Origin: Nashville, Tennessee
- Genres: Country pop, folk-pop
- Years active: 2018–2020
- Label: Triple Tigers
- Spinoff of: The JaneDear girls
- Past members: Colbie Caillat; Nelly Joy; Jason Reeves; Justin Kawika Young

Gone West was an American country pop group composed of Colbie Caillat, Justin Young, Jason Reeves, and Nelly Joy. They made their debut as a band on the Grand Ole Opry stage and signed with Triple Tigers. The band released their debut and only album, Canyons, on June 12, 2020.

== Background ==
=== 2018–2019: Formation and debut ===
Gone West was formed in 2018 and was composed of Colbie Caillat, Justin Kawika Young, Nelly Joy, and her husband Jason Reeves, and was formed following the four touring together in support of Caillat's The Malibu Sessions. The band was based out of Nashville, Tennessee, and got its name from the fact that its four members all hailed from states (Reeves from Iowa, Joy from Texas, Caillat from California, and Young from Hawaii) west of Tennessee, which was the inspiration for the band's "autobiographical theme song" and titular track "Gone West." All of its members had previous experience in the music industry as recording artists and songwriters: Caillat as a Grammy-winning folk pop artist, Young as an artist in the contemporary Hawaiian music scene, Reeves as a songwriter of some of Caillat's biggest hits and an indie artist, and Nelly Joy as one half of country duo The JaneDear girls.

The EP, Tides, was released on January 18, 2019. It reached No. 7 on Billboard's Heatseekers Albums chart, No. 17 on Country Albums Sales, and No. 74 on the Top Current Albums chart.

"What Could've Been" was released to country radio on July 15, 2019, as the band's debut single and the lead-off single to their debut studio album, Canyons, which was a top 30 hit on the Country Airplay chart in 2020. Writing for Nashville Lifestyles Magazine, music critic Luke Levenson praised "What Could've Been," saying it "is a crisp yet plaintive ballad, with vocals which stand out and blend together naturally." Canyons, Gone West's debut album, was released on June 12, 2020.

=== 2020: Disbandment ===
On August 12, 2020, following the split between Caillat and Young, it was announced via social media that the group had disbanded.

== Discography ==
=== Studio albums ===
Title	Album details	Peak chart positions			Sales
Title	Album details	US Country	US Heat	US Indie	Sales
Canyons	Release date: June 12, 2020; Label: Triple Tigers; Format: CD, digital download, vinyl	28	2	29	

=== Extended plays ===
Title	EP details	Peak chart positions		Sales
Title	EP details	US Country	US Heat	Sales
Tides	Release date: January 18, 2019; Label: Triple Tigers; Format: CD, digital download	— (Note: Tides did not reach the Top Country Albums chart, but peaked at number 17 on the Country Album Sales component chart.)	7	US: 5,600
"—" denotes releases that did not chart

=== Singles ===
Year	Single	Peak chart positions			Sales	Album
Year	Single	US Country	US Country Airplay	CAN Country	Sales	Album
2019	"What Could've Been"	34	27	50	US: 21,000	Canyons

==== Promotional singles ====
Year	Single	Album
2020	"Slow Down"	Canyons

=== Music videos ===
Year	Video	Director
2019	"Gone West"	P. Tracy
2019	"What Could've Been"	P. Tracy
