= The Magnificent Adventures of Heartache =

Studio album by Jason Reeves
- Released: 2007
- Recorded: 2006–2007
- Studios: Revolver Studios, Westlake Village, California
- Genres: Rock, pop, singer-songwriter
- Length: 66:38
- Labels: abeautifularmyoftrees, Warner Bros.
- Producer: Mikal Blue

Jason Reeves chronology
The Nervous Mind of Love (2004)	The Magnificent Adventures of Heartache (2007)	The Lovesick (2011)

The Magnificent Adventures of Heartache (full title The Magnificent Adventures of Heartache [And Other Frightening Tales...]) is the fourth studio album by American singer-songwriter and musician Jason Reeves. The album was self-released in 2007 on the label abeautifularmyoftrees in the United States and later was re-released under Warner Bros. Records on July 31, 2008. Recording and production for the album took place during 2006 and 2007 at the Revolver recording studio in Westlake Village, CA with producer Mikal Blue, as well as at The Backyard Studios with producer Stuart Brawley.

== Background ==
Production for The Magnificent Adventures Of Heartache began in 2006 and 2007 after Reeves's first EP with Mikal Blue, Hearts Are Magnets, and around the time that Reeves was working on material with Colbie Caillat for her first album, Coco. The album was again recorded with producer Mikal Blue at his Revolver recording studio and Reeves self-released the album in 2007. He promoted the album through his myspace page and sold it at live shows and through online stores such as cdbaby.com. The release gained Reeves distinctions such as "Top Folk Album of 2007" from iTunes and "No. 1 Unsigned Folk Artist" on myspace.

The album helped Reeves sign a deal with Warner Bros. Records in 2008 that lead to the major label re-release of the album. This version of the album (which included four remixed tracks) was released in stores and online on September 9, 2008.

== Track listing ==
No.	Title	Writer(s)	Length
1.	"Someone Somewhere"	Jason Reeves, Rune Westberg	4:28
2.	"Happy Accident"	Jason Reeves, Xandy Berry	3:45
3.	"You in a Song"	Jason Reeves, Wendy Page	3:53
4.	"Reaching"	Jason Reeves, Xandy Berry	4:21
5.	"Pretty Eyes"	Jason Reeves, Mikal Blue	4:37
6.	"Entwined"	Jason Reeves, Wendy Page	3:56
7.	"Sunbeam Lights"	Jason Reeves	1:03
8.	"Never Find Again"	Jason Reeves, Stuart Brawley	5:56
9.	"New Hampshire"	Jason Reeves	6:38
10.	"Old Fashioned Letters"	Jason Reeves, Stuart Brawley	4:12
11.	"Just Friends"	Jason Reeves	3:43
12.	"The Fragrant Taste Of Rain"	Jason Reeves	1:48
13.	"Gasoline"	Jason Reeves, Mikal Blue	3:52
14.	"Photographs & Memories"	Jason Reeves	5:27
15.	"The End"	Jason Reeves, Rune Westberg	5:00

== Personnel ==
Primary musicians

- Jason Reeves – acoustic guitar, piano, vocals
- Mikal Blue – bass, guitars, piano, organ, background vocals (tracks 2, 4, 5, 7, 9, 11, 12, 13, 14)

Additional musicians

- Rune Westberg – guitars, bass, keys (tracks 1, 15)
- Jim Marr – guitars, keyboards, programming (tracks 3, 6)
- Wendy Page – background vocals (tracks 3, 6)
- Stuart brawley – piano, organ, keys, bass (tracks 8, 10)
- Tim Myers – guitars, rhodes piano, piano (tracks 2, 9, 13, 14)
- Victor Indrizzo – drums (tracks 2, 9, 11, 13)
- Curt Schneider – bass, background vocals (track 5)
- Dave Morada – bass (track 14)
- David Salinas – drums (track 14)
- Brian Macleod – drums (track 5)
- David Levita – guitars, electric flute (track 5)
- Joe Corcoran – guitars (tracks 8, 10), bass (track 8)
- George doering – acoustic guitar (track 10)
- Jamie Wollam – drums (track 10)
- Lester nuby – drums (track 8)
- Angel Taylor – vocals (track 11)
- Kare Kabel mai – drums (tracks 1, 15)

Production personnel

- Mikal Blue – producer, mixer
- Curt Schneider – producer, mixer (track 5)
- Rune Westberg – producer, mixer (tracks 1, 15)
- Stuart Brawley – producer, mixer (tracks 8, 10)
- Joe Corcoran – engineer
- Brian Arias – engineer
- Jim Marr – producer, mixer (tracks 3, 6)
- Wendy Page – producer, mixer (tracks 3, 6)
- Joe Yannece – mastering
- Alex Yank – photographer
- Jessica Fick – photographer
- Jason Reeves – photographer, artwork
