= Brendan James =

American singer-songwriter

Brendan James Ernst
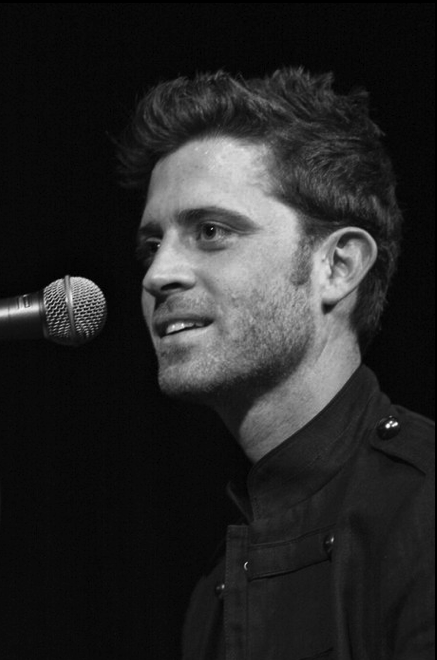
- Brendan James

Background information
- Born: July 17, 1979 (age 47); Nashua, New Hampshire, United States
- Origin: Derry, New Hampshire, United States
- Genres: Soft rock, pop rock, folk rock
- Occupations: Singer-songwriter, musician
- Instruments: Vocals, piano
- Years active: 2007–present
- Label: Decca Records
- Website: www.BrendanJames.com

Brendan James (born July 17, 1979) is an American, piano-based singer-songwriter from Derry, New Hampshire. James spent his early music career playing at New York City open mics before he signed to Capitol Records in 2005. At Capitol he spent a year and a half recording his debut album, but was dropped before its release during the Capitol Records/Virgin Records merger in 2007. After leaving Capitol, he self-produced and released an EP, The Ballroom Break-in. He signed to Decca Records in 2008 and has released two studio albums with the label. His debut album, The Day is Brave, was released in 2008, while his self-titled second album, Brendan James, came out in 2010. He has toured nationally to support the albums, including tours with artists such as Jason Reeves, John Mayer, Tyrone Wells, Matt White, and Amber Rubarth.

== Early life ==
James was born Brendan James Ernst in Nashua, New Hampshire on July 17, 1979, to parents Patricia and Randy, and is of Irish and German descent. He moved to Derry, New Hampshire, when he was four and, after the divorce of his parents, alternated living between Derry and nearby Manchester, New Hampshire. James had an early interest in performing and singing, leading him to perform in school plays and musicals while growing up. He attended high school at Pinkerton Academy in Derry. After the death of a friend's mother, James sang "Candle in the Wind" at her funeral with a local music teacher he knew, Kevin Kandel, accompanying him on piano. The collaboration began a friendship between the two and Kandel helped spur James's interest in music.

== Music career ==
=== 1998–2002: University of North Carolina and Los Angeles ===
After graduating high school James went on to attend college at the University of North Carolina, beginning with a major in Voice before switching to Communications. During breaks from school he would head back to Derry and meet up with Kandel, who persuaded James to learn an instrument. James began teaching himself piano at the age of 19 and also started writing and composing songs. Back at the University of North Carolina, James joined the Clef Hangers, an a cappella group. With the Clef Hangers he would sing solo covers of "I Can't Make You Love Me", "Father Figure", and "Die Without You," songs that were later released on compilation CDs from the group. During his Junior year of college, wanting to pursue a career in music, he left UNC and went to Hollywood. He earned school credits during the stay on the condition that he accept an internship at a business related to his Communications degree. While living in Los Angeles, he played at a club called The Crooked Bar (located underneath the Coconut Teaszer), while working on songs and performing. When his internship ended he returned to the University of North Carolina to complete his Communications degree, which he obtained in 2002.>

=== 2003–06: Early New York and Capitol Records ===
After graduation from college, James had planned to return to Los Angeles and focus on his music career, even paying a rent deposit for an LA apartment. However, he changed his plans and decided to move to New York City following a day visit to the city. He worked at a job at Urban Outfitters to support himself. He held that job for the next three years while also performing at open mikes in the East Village. Around this time he also began breaking into various hotels, ballrooms and schools to use a piano to practice with pianos so he could practice. In 2003 he partnered with his manager Ben Singer, a former classmate James had met at UNC. Ben helped him record a demo that eventually made its way to Carly Simon, who invited James to come and record a song with her. The song, "Let the River Run", would play at the 2003 Nobel Peace Prize ceremony.

In 2005 James would record another demo, this time professionally produced by Tony Bruno in Woodstock, New York at the Millbrook Sound Studio. The demo caught the interest of major labels and James did a showcase at The Living Room in New York City for various record companies. After the showcase, James was invited to Los Angeles to play for Capitol Records CEO Andrew Slater. Slater signed him to a record deal and James spent the next year and a half working on his debut album, recording with producers Tony Bruno and Patrick Leonard. Production of the album was wrought with difficulties: re-recording, disagreements over artistic direction and waiting on record label decisions extended the production. After re-recording the album with a new producer, it was almost ready to be released when James was dropped from Capitol Records following the merger and takeover of Capitol by Virgin Records. James, along with many other artists, was dismissed from the newly merged label, but was allowed the keep his master tapes and was given a severance package.

=== 2007–08: The Ballroom Break-In, The Day Is Brave and Decca Records ===
Still living in New York, James used and built upon the music he developed and recorded at Capitol, working to release the album himself. He recorded material from the Capitol album with Los Angeles-based producer Mikal Blue, turning it into James's self-released EP, The Ballroom Break-In, in 2007. The title of the EP was based on his early days in New York City, when he broke into venues to practice playing and writing songs on a piano. After the release of the EP, Tomas Young, a paralyzed Iraq War veteran, heard one of its songs, "Hero's Song," on iTunes. Music from his EP was also used in television shows, including "The Sun Will Rise" which appeared on the ABC drama Private Practice in 2007. James and Blue quickly followed up The Ballroom Break-in with the full-length album, The Day Is Brave. The album used most of the material from the EP and some of the Capitol songs, but also contained new material James had written. As his EP's exposure grew, including a feature on Perez Hilton, James again gained the interest of major record labels. In 2008 he signed with Decca Records.

Decca Records released Brendan James's debut album, The Day Is Brave on June 3, 2008, in the United States, and on June 17, 2008, in Canada. It debuted on the Top 10 Billboard Heatseeker Charts, with Newsweek and Entertainment Weekly praising his debut effort. The album's single was "Green" and a music video was produced for the song. James initially toured regionally to support the album, headlining his own shows and also opening for artists such as Corinne Bailey Rae, John Legend, Susan Tedeschi, The Fray, and Robert Cray. At the end of 2008 James went on his first national tour, headlining on the MTV SoundTRACKER Tour.

=== 2009–2011: Brendan James ===
Writing for James's second album began in early 2009 after the MTV Soundtracker Tour had ended. James moved from New York City to Los Angeles, where he is currently based, after having spent much time there in the past few years. Writing and production lasted for the next year and James said the second album was "far more difficult to write than my first." He traveled to London to make the album but the production work done there was scrapped. He eventually started working with producer Warren Huart back in Los Angeles and finished the album there. During the creation of his second album James embarked on more touring, including notable tours with John Mayer's Mayercraft Carrier 2 in March 2009 and one sponsored by scooter-maker Vespa in May 2009. The Vespa-sponsored "green tour" with Jason Reeves and Amber Rubarth saw them traveling the California Coast on Vespa scooters while focusing on environmental friendliness. James was also getting his songs on more television shows, like So You Think You Can Dance, Bones and Army Wives.

James's second album, the self-titled Brendan James, was completed in 2010 released on September 7, 2010. The album debuted at No. 93 on the Billboard 200, making it more successful than his previous album. The album's single was "The Fall" and again a music video was made, this time featuring Melissa Ordway as the female lead. The song "Stupid for Your Love" was also available for free on James's website as part of the album promotion. Touring to support the album continued through 2010 and into early 2011, with a notable tour with musician Matt White.

=== 2012: Hope in Transition ===
In November 2011 James announced via his Twitter account that he was planning on releasing a new album of 10 songs in February 2012. This was pushed back to July 2012.

The new album, Hope in Transition was produced by Max Coane, with additional tracks produced by Julian Coryell. Engineering by Bill Mims, Chandler Harrod, Max Coane, and Jeff Hannan. Mixing by Jeff Hannan, Max Coane, and Erich Gobel. The album was mastered by Gavin Lurssen assisted by Reuben Cohen.

"Hope in Transition" was released on July 10, 2012, via Rock Ridge Music.

=== 2013: Simplify ===
Brendan opened for Tyrone Wells on his US tour during March and April 2013. On March 19, 2013, Brendan James announced a Kickstarter campaign to raise money to promote his new album, which he said was "almost done". He described it as "a 12 song album, traditionally recorded live with my touring band, and inspired by the style of my idols – James Taylor, Paul Simon, Bob Dylan, and others." As of March 26, 2013, he had raised $26,139 of his $20,000 goal in only 10 days, with 15 days still left in the funding period, with a total of $33,948 raised at the conclusion of the funding period.

The album, titled "Simplify", was released on August 6, 2013

=== 2020: Leap Taken ===
In 2018 Brendan released a non-album single 'Wish You Well'. It was featured in the Australian TV soap 'Neighbours' on April 3, 2019, in the UK.

His most recent album "Leap Taken" was released on October 20, 2020.

== Musical styles and influences ==
James is a singer-songwriter with a piano-based style. He cites taking inspiration from 1970s artists James Taylor, Bob Dylan, Paul Simon and Stevie Wonder, as well as more current artists like Ryan Adams and Death Cab For Cutie.

== Discography ==
=== Albums ===
Year	Album details	Peak chart positions				Certifications (sales threshold)
Year	Album details	U.S. Billboard 200	U.S. Heatseekers	U.S. Digital	U.S. Rock	Certifications (sales threshold)
2008	The Day is Brave: Released: June 3, 2008; Label: Decca Records; Format: CD, digital download	—	9	—	—	—
2010	Brendan James: Released: September 7, 2010; Label: Decca Records; Format: CD, digital download	93	—	—	—	—
2012	Hope in Transition: Released: July 10, 2012; Label: Rock Ridge Music; Format: CD, digital download	—	14	—	—	—
2013	Simplify: Released: August 6, 2013; Label: Lot 100 Productions/Noble Steed Music; Format: CD, digital download	—	—	—	—	—
2020	Leap Taken: Released: October 20, 2020; Label: Lot 100 Productions; Format: CD, digital download	—	—	—	—	—

=== Singles ===
Year	Title	Chart positions		Album
Year	Title	U.S. Hot 100	U.S. Heatseekers Songs	Album
2008	"Green"	—	—	The Day Is Brave
2010	"The Fall"	—	—	Brendan James

=== EPs ===
- The Ballroom Break-In (2007)
- The Howl (2015)
