= The JaneDear Girls =

American country music duo

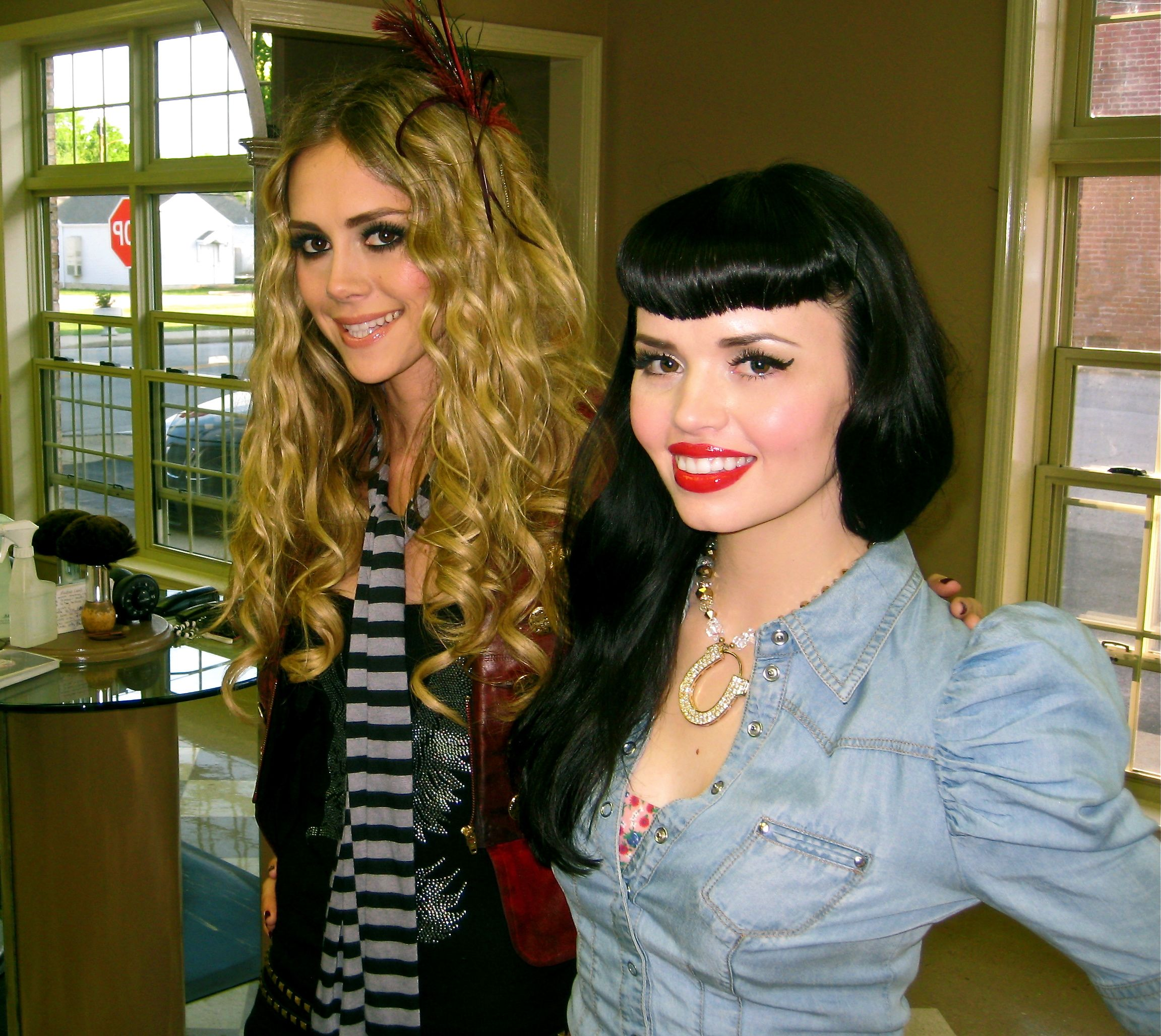
- The JaneDear Girls on the set of the "Shotgun Girl" music video (Danelle Leverett, left, and Susie Brown, right)

Background information
- Origin: Nashville, Tennessee, U.S.
- Genre: Country
- Years active: 2004–2012
- Label: Reprise Nashville
- Spinoffs: Gone West
- Past members: Susie Brown; Danelle Leverett

The JaneDear Girls were an American country music duo, consisting of Susie Brown (vocals, mandolin, fiddle, bass, guitar, accordion) from Alpine, Utah, and Danelle Leverett (vocals, guitar, banjo, harmonica) from Amarillo, Texas. The duo was with Warner Music Group Nashville's Reprise from 2010 to 2012. Their debut single, "Wildflower," was a Top 20 hit on the Hot Country Songs chart. After releasing only one album, the duo parted ways in mid-2012.

== Biography ==
Danelle Leverett and Susie Brown met while at a songwriters' concert in Nashville, Tennessee. After being introduced to each other by songwriter Kris Bergsnes, they began writing songs together and later decided to form a duo, also by suggestion of Bergsnes.

They signed with Reprise Records' Nashville division. John Rich (of Big & Rich) signed on as their record producer, and began mentoring them as well. In mid-2010, Reprise released their debut single, "Wildflower." The song peaked at number 15 on the Hot Country Songs charts. Follow-up single "Shotgun Girl" stayed on the charts for 20 weeks, peaking at number 36 in July 2011. The album's third single, "Merry Go Round," was released on September 19, 2011, and peaked at number 44.

In early 2011, the duo received their first nominations at Academy of Country Music Awards including Top Vocal Duo and Top New Vocal Duo or Group. The awards were later awarded to Sugarland and The Band Perry, respectively. On January 31, 2012, they released a digital single, "Good Girls Gone Bad", featured on the soundtrack for the short-lived ABC drama GCB.

Brown and Leverett stopped recording together in mid-2012, with Brown announcing plans to record a solo album with producer James Stroud. Leverett co-wrote Big & Rich's 2012 single "That's Why I Pray", and began recording as Nelly Joy. In 2019, Joy joined the band Gone West.

== Discography ==
=== Studio albums ===
Title	Details	Peak chart positions	
Title	Details	US Country	US
The JaneDear Girls	Release date: February 1, 2011; Label: Reprise Nashville; Formats: CD, music download	10	46

=== Singles ===
Year	Single	Peak chart positions		Album
Year	Single	US Country	US	Album
2010	"Wildflower"	15	60	the JaneDear girls
2011	"Shotgun Girl"	36	—	the JaneDear girls
2011	"Merry Go Round"	44	—	the JaneDear girls
"—" denotes releases that did not chart

=== Music videos ===
Year	Video	Director
2010	"Wildflower"	Deaton-Flanigen Productions
2011	"Shotgun Girl"	Deaton-Flanigen Productions

== Awards and nominations ==
Year	Association	Category	Result
2011	Academy of Country Music Awards	Top New Vocal Duo or Group	Nominated
2011	Academy of Country Music Awards	Top Vocal Duo of the Year	Nominated
2011	CMT Music Awards	Duo Video of the Year — "Wildflower"	Nominated
2011	American Country Awards	Single by a New Artist — "Wildflower"	Nominated
