= Jason Reeves =

American musician and songwriter (born 1984)

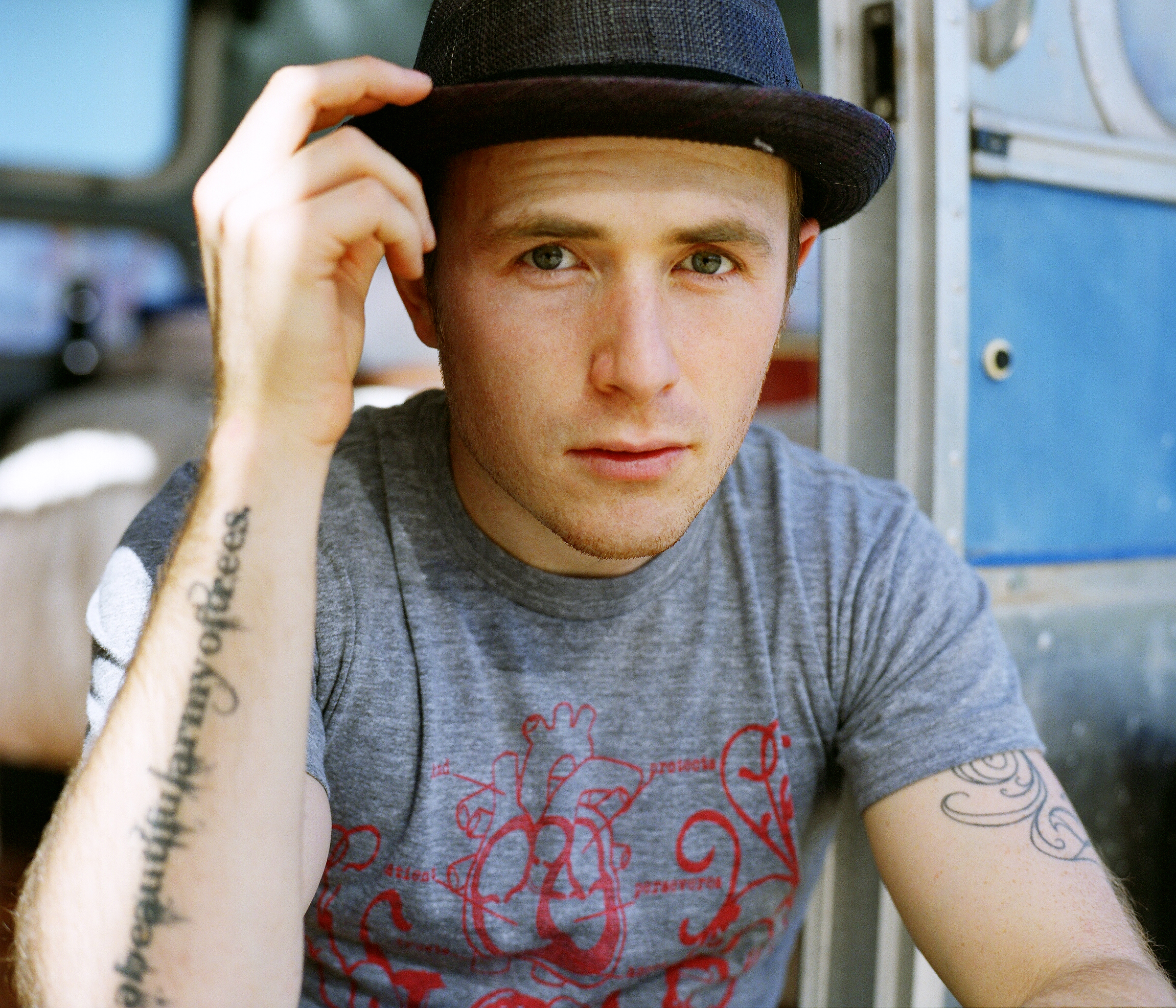
- Reeves in 2011

Background information
- Born: Jason Bradford Reeves; July 1, 1984 (age 42); Arlington, Texas, U.S.
- Origin: Iowa City, Iowa, U.S.
- Occupations: Songwriter; musician
- Instruments: Vocals; guitar
- Years active: 2003–present
- Labels: abeautifularmyoftrees; Warner Bros.
- Formerly of: Gone West

Jason Bradford Reeves (born July 1, 1984) is an American songwriter, singer, and guitarist. He is best known for his songwriting work for Colbie Caillat, with whom he formed the acoustic pop band Gone West in 2018.

Born in Arlington, Texas and raised in Iowa City, Iowa, he relocated to California in 2005 in pursuit of a musical career. Here, he met Caillat and record producer Mikal Blue; all three contributed to Caillat's 2007 single "Bubbly", which peaked at number five on the Billboard Hot 100. He subsequently co-wrote her single "Realize" the following year, as well her 2010 single "I Never Told You", both of which peaked within the top 40 of the chart. Apart from Caillat, Reeves has co-written Australian singer Lenka's 2008 single "The Show".

As a recording artist himself, he released four albums and an extended play before being led by Kara DioGuardi to sign with Warner Bros. Records in 2008. His fourth album, The Magnificent Adventures of Heartache (2008) was re-released commercially by the label, and followed by his fifth, Patience for the Waiting (2009). His sixth, The Lovesick (2011) was released independently. His work has led him to being named one of the Top Indie Singer-Songwriters by iTunes in 2007 and a No. 1 Folk Artist by Myspace in 2011. His accolades include three ASCAP Awards and a Latin Grammy Award nomination.

== Early life ==
Jason Reeves was born in Arlington, Texas and relocated to Iowa City, Iowa when he was around 3 years old with his father, a worker at Maytag/Whirlpool, and his mother, a food stylist/ice skating teacher. When Reeves was five years old his mother started him on piano lessons, lessons that he continued for five years before quitting. After the piano, he began to take drum lessons for a few years, before eventually settling on the guitar at 17 and teaching himself how to play. Around this time he began listening to artists such as Bob Dylan, Led Zeppelin and James Taylor, which he'd later cite as personal influences.

Attending Iowa City High School, Reeves was involved with various choirs and vocal groups, even touring Europe with the Midwest Honor Choir in 2002. During this time he also performed in a band with friends and recorded his own full-length album with a local community music program.

== Career ==
=== Early career in Iowa ===
Reeves began to get into musical recording at the end of high school, with his first CD being a self-produced album with a run of about 200 copies. After graduating high school, he went on to attend college at the nearby University of Iowa but quickly dropped out due to a lack of interest. He continued on with music, playing at local venues and bars. For the next two years he continued to play around Iowa City and self-released two albums with a local producer, Ken Heaton. These two albums, Makeshift Aircraft (2003) and Nervous Mind of Love (2004), were sold at his shows as well as on independent, online music seller cdbaby.com.

Around late 2004/early 2005 he was contacted by California producer Mikal Blue who was interested in working together. Blue became aware of Reeves through his own manager, Anna Rambeau, who herself became aware of Reeves through cdbaby.com. Blue offered to have Reeves come out to his California studio, Revolver, to record some tracks together. Reeves accepted and flew out to Los Angeles, California, with the intention of recording and coming back to Iowa.

=== Mikal Blue and Colbie Caillat ===
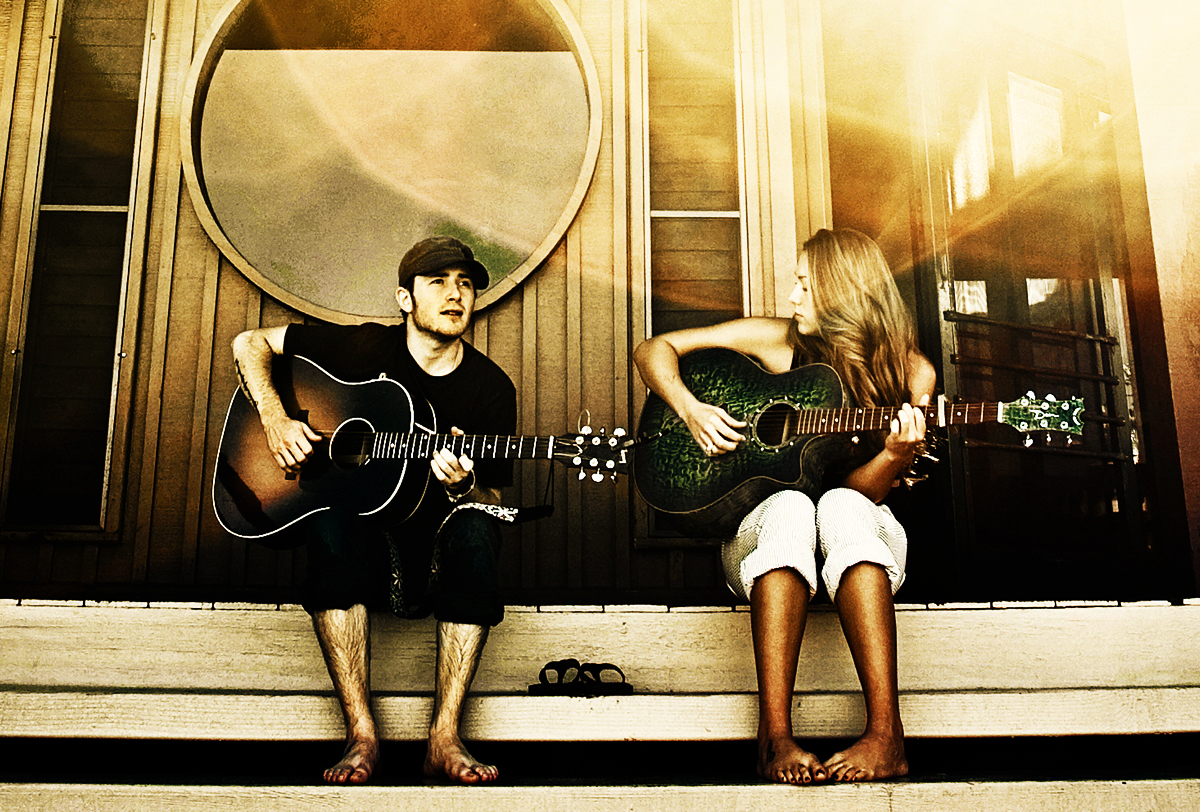
Reeves with longtime-collaborator Colbie Caillat

Reeves arrived in California around February 2005 and met with Blue to begin recording songs. Shortly after arriving, Blue introduced Reeves to a young female singer he was working with, Colbie Caillat. Caillat and Reeves formed a quick friendship and Caillat's family invited Reeves to stay with them during his recordings with Blue. This eventually became Reeve's home as he decided to stay in California and not return to Iowa.

Caillat and Reeves began a working partnership, hanging out and co-writing many songs together and playing local venues. Caillat also introduced Reeves to the social networking site Myspace, using the site to release music they wrote. After the release of the Blue-produced EP Hearts Are Magnets in 2006, Caillat and Reeves kept composing and posting songs to Myspace. They wrote Chasing The Sun for Hilary Duff.

=== Coco and The Magnificent Adventures of Heartache ===
Caillat's career first gained traction and attention on Myspace, leading her to be declared the No. 1 unsigned artist on the site. The popularity of the Myspace-hosted song "Bubbly" led to a record deal for Caillat with Universal Republic Records. Using the material that Caillat had worked on with Reeves, Caillat released her debut album Coco in 2007. The Mikal Blue-produced album featured ten songs co-written by Reeves. The lead single from the album, the Reeves co-write "Bubbly", was a commercial success, reaching up to the top 5 on the Billboard charts. The song "Realize", which featured vocals by Reeves, also performed well on the charts. Reeves and Caillat won three ASCAP awards for these two songs.

Reeves continued to work on his own music as well, and in 2007 self-released the album The Magnificent Adventures of Heartache (And Other Frightening Tales...), which was likewise produced by Mikal Blue, as well two tracks produced by Stuart Brawley. The album had modest success on iTunes, debuting at No. 2 on the folk charts and went to being named one of the top indie albums of the year on iTunes. He also had popularity as an artist on Myspace, being named the site's No. 1 unsigned folk artist for nine months.

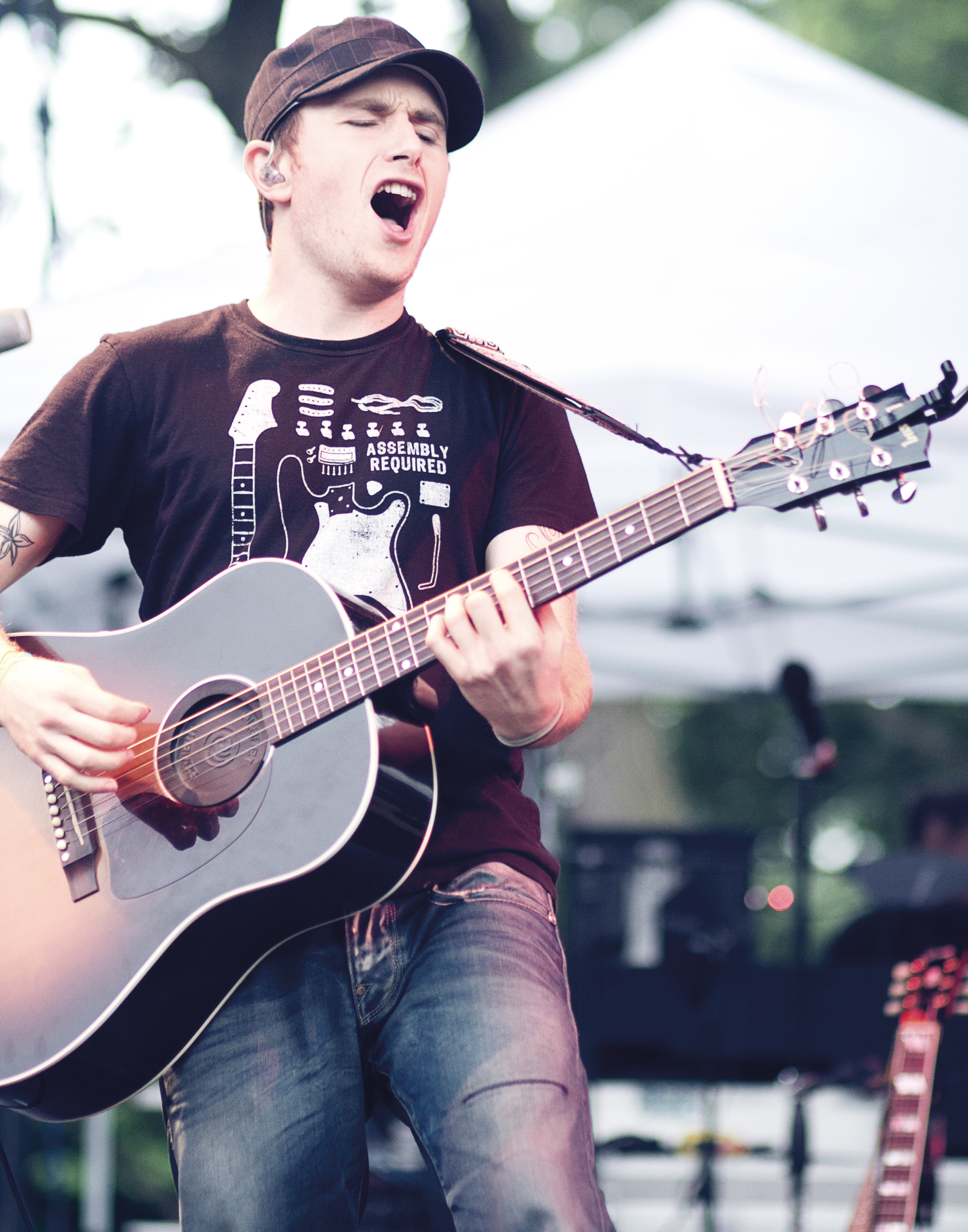
Reeves playing live

=== Kara DioGuardi and Warner Bros. Records ===
In 2007/2008, Reeves was playing many shows around Los Angeles and had residencies at places like the Hotel Café. Kara DioGuardi became aware of Jason Reeves after the release of his album The Magnificent Adventures of Heartache and listened to the CD during a long car trip in Maine. As the vice president of A&R at Warner Bros. Records, she contacted Reeves and brought him to then-president Tom Whalley who signed Reeves to the label. DioGuardi and Reeves would end up working together on music, most notably co-writing the song "Terrified" which they would perform together on YouTube and Lopez Tonight. The song was later covered by Didi Benami on the ninth season of American Idol and Katharine McPhee for her second album Unbroken and featured vocals from Reeves.

Now signed to major label, Reeves' recently completed album, The Magnificent Adventures of Heartache, was re-released under the Warner Bros. Records label in 2008 with four remixed tracks. Songs from that and previous albums would also be featured on TV shows such as Army Wives and One Tree Hill around this time. Reeves also began touring nationally to support The Magnificent Adventures of Heartache with musician Tyrone Wells and others.

Reeves began work on an EP and also doing co-writing sessions with Colbie Caillat for her second album, Breakthrough, as well as writing sessions with other artists. He did more frequent bouts of touring, including a May 2009 Vespa-sponsored "green tour" with Brendan James and Amber Rubarth during which they toured the California Coast on Vespa scooters while focusing on environmental friendliness. Near the end of 2009, Reeve's EP Patience for the Waiting was released by Warner Bros. Records.

=== The Lovesick and Caged Birds Set Free ===
Reeves had completed material for a new album, The Lovesick, with producer Adam B Smith in Nashville, in early 2010 but the album was put on hold during the transition at Warner. Bros Records when CEO Tom Whalley stepped down in September 2010. The album featured collaborations with Kara DiaGuardi and Colbie Caillat. Warner Bros. Records eventually released a track from the album, "Helium Hearts", as a single in July 2010. With the single, a music video was also released. Months passed and Reeves was dropped from Warner Bros. Records following the aftermath of Tom Whalley leaving, but was allowed to keep his master tapes. He self-released the album The Lovesick in August 2011, a whole year after the initial single was released and nearly four years since his last full-length album.

On November 15, 2011, Reeves released another EP, Caged Birds Set Free, which hailed back to acoustic styles from The Magnificent Adventures of Heartache. The EP features a re-recording of "Wishing Weed" featuring Colbie Caillat and a song featuring Kara DioGuardi, "New York in Wintertime".

Reeves also continues to work as a co-writer, writing songs for such artists as Lenka, Angel Taylor, Demi Lovato, The JaneDear Girls and the Japanese group Kimaguren. The song "The Show" that Reeves co-wrote with artist Lenka did well, being used in advertisements for Old Navy and Ugly Betty. "The Show" was also featured in the films Moneyball and Angus, Thongs and Perfect Snogging.

=== Songs Are Silent Films ===
Reeves released his new full-length album called Songs Are Silent Films on June 12, later than expected, on all digital retailers. He again worked with Nashville Producer, Adam Smith, on many of the tracks. Through pledgemusic.com, Jason asked fans to pledge to support the production of his new album, after being dropped by the Major Label. Pledgers get access to updates about the album as well as some of the songs to be released on the album.

“There's a little bit of everything on it," Reeves said about the new record. "It goes from really stripped-down acoustic to full band. There's a couple things on there that I’ve never tried before, but for the most part it's a return to the way I have been doing it all along – just the acoustic, organic feel."

The first song from the album is called "Back With Me" and was released on March 27 along with a video on YouTube, which was directed by Reeves. The second promotional released song from Songs Are Silent Films is "You're My Best Friend" and was released on April 17. The first official single is called "More In Love With You" and features Nelly Joy, who formerly recorded under her real name Danelle Leverett as one-half of The JaneDear girls.

=== High Dive Heart ===
Reeves released the single "Vintage" on April 21, 2015, from his newest project High Dive Heart, a pop duo consisting of himself and Nelly Joy, who formerly recorded under her real name Danelle Leverett in the group The JaneDear girls. On July 17, 2015, High Dive Heart released their first EP: Sonic Graffiti – EP.

== Personal life ==
Reeves is mainly interested in the arts and besides music is into writing, photography and illustration. He has done the artwork for his own albums and is passionate about taking photos. After years of living in Los Angeles, Reeves currently resides in Nashville, Tennessee. He married his musical collaborator Nelly Joy.

== Discography ==
=== Albums ===
- Makeshift Aircraft (2003)
- The Nervous Mind of Love (2004)
- Hearts Are Magnets (EP) (2006)
- The Magnificent Adventures of Heartache (And Other Frightening Tales...) (2007)
  - The album was re-released by Warner Bros. Records in 2008 with four remixed tracks
- Patience for the Waiting (2009)
- The Lovesick (August 2011)
- Caged Birds Set Free (EP) (November 2011)
- Songs Are Silent Films (June 12, 2012, charted at number 15 on the Billboard Americana/Folk Albums chart)
- Sketches (September 30, 2016)
- Alien Artform (October 6, 2017)
- Portals (September 21, 2018)
- Canyons (June 12, 2020) - with Gone West
- What A Mess, The Human Mind (August 27, 2021)
