= Nelly Joy =

American singer-songwriter

- Born: Danelle Leverett
- Origin: Amarillo, Texas, U.S.
- Genres: Country, pop, folk
- Occupation: Singer-songwriter
- Formerly of: The JaneDear girls, Gone West

Nelly Joy (born Danelle Leverett) is an American singer-songwriter known for her work as a founding member of the country duo The JaneDear Girls and later as a member of the group Gone West. As a songwriter, she has been credited on songs recorded by artists including Kelly Clarkson and Big & Rich.

== Early life and education ==
Joy is from Amarillo, Texas. She moved to Nashville to pursue songwriting and music performance and attended Abilene Christian University.

== Career ==
=== The JaneDear Girls ===
Joy formed the duo The JaneDear Girls with Susie Brown. The act received national press coverage during the early 2010s and released music on Warner Bros. Records. Media coverage from the period also discussed the duo's touring and television appearances.

=== Songwriting ===
Joy has been credited as a songwriter on songs recorded by other artists. She was a co-writer of "The Sun Will Rise," a track recorded by Kelly Clarkson for the deluxe edition of Clarkson's 2011 album, Stronger. She also co-wrote "That's Why I Pray," recorded by Big & Rich. Leverett co-wrote “Ecos de Amor (Echoes of Love)” for the Mexican pop duo Jesse & Joy. The song was nominated for Song of the Year at the 17th Annual Latin Grammy Awards. As of 2026, the song has surpassed 290 million streams on Spotify and 580 million views on YouTube.

=== Gone West ===
Joy later joined Gone West, a group featuring Colbie Caillat, Jason Reeves, and Justin Young. MusicRow reported that the group signed with Triple Tigers Records for its early releases. The group's debut album Canyons received coverage from outlets including Billboard and People.

== Discography ==
=== With The JaneDear Girls ===
- The JaneDear Girls (2011)

=== With Gone West ===
- Canyons (2020)

== Selected songwriting credits ==
- "The Sun Will Rise" (recorded by Kelly Clarkson)
- "That's Why I Pray" (recorded by Big & Rich)
