= Christmas in the Sand (song) =

Single by Colbie Caillat

from the album Christmas in the Sand
- Released: October 23, 2012
- Genre: Christmas; pop
- Length: 3:48
- Label: Universal Republic
- Songwriter(s): Colbie Caillat; Jason Reeves; Kara DioGuardi
- Producer(s): Ken Caillat

Colbie Caillat singles chronology
"Favorite Song" (2011)	"Christmas in the Sand" (2012)	"Hold On" (2013)

Music video
- "Christmas in the Sand" on YouTube

"Christmas in the Sand" is a Christmas song recorded by American singer-songwriter Colbie Caillat. It was written by Caillat, Jason Reeves and Kara DioGuardi and produced by Colbie's father, Ken Caillat. The song was released as the first single from her first Christmas album Christmas in the Sand. The song was released to SoundCloud on October 15, 2012 through Universal Republic.

== Background and release ==
Colbie told Billboard she wrote this song "thinking, what do they listen to over here Hawaii at Christmas time? I bet they don't always want to hear songs about white Christmases and bundling up 'cause it's cold outside. They want to have a holiday song they can relate to." Caillat teamed up with writing partners Kara DioGuardi and Jason Reeves to craft the bubbly and admittedly silly track, "Kara started coming up with all these funny lyrics about Santa falling off his surf board and Rudolph playing reindeer games on me," she says. "It's such a fun song and really shows a silly side of my personality that most people don't see besides my friends and family."

The song was uploaded to Universal Republic's SoundCloud page on October 3, 2012, but released on October 15, 2012. Colbie posted the link to it on her Facebook and Twitter pages.

== Critical reception ==
Linny's Vault described Colbie's voice 'strong, yet sweet', and also described the song as 'nothing like I've heard before and definitely fits to my kind of warm CA Christmas. (...) The upbeat tune of the song makes you want to sway in your seat (I literally did).'

== Music video ==
On October 19, 2012, Colbie uploaded a lyric video for the song on her YouTube page. The official video premiered on November 21 on VEVO. The video was filmed in Malibu.

== Charts ==
Chart (2012)	Peak position
Canada AC (Billboard)	10
US Adult Contemporary (Billboard)	16
