= Beth Shak =

American poker player (born 1969)

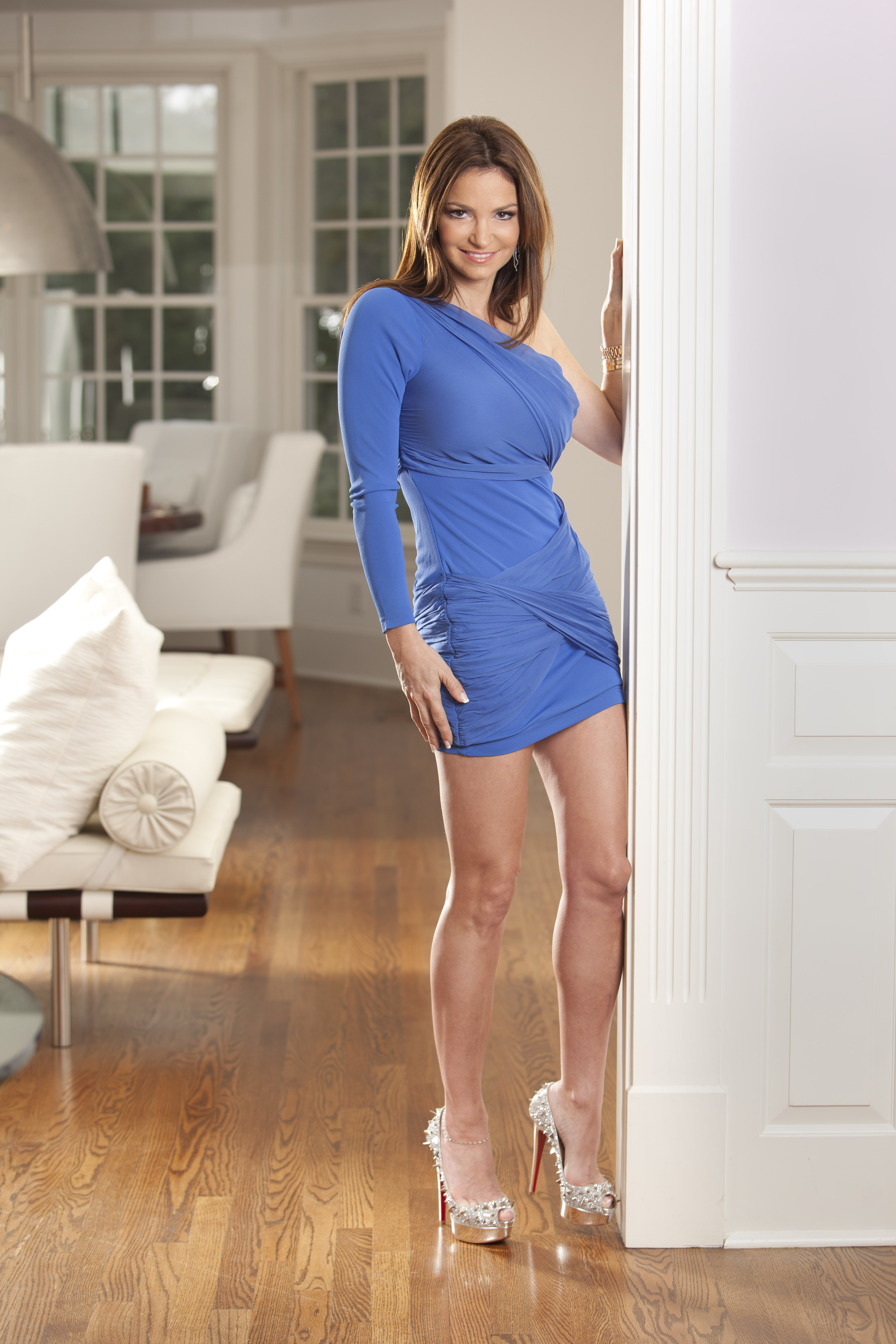
- Born: November 8, 1969 (age 57)

World Series of Poker
- Bracelet: None
- Final tables: 3
- Money finishes: 8

World Poker Tour
- Title: None
- Final table: None
- Money finishes: 4

European Poker Tour
- Title: None
- Final table: None
- Money finish: 1

Beth Shak (born November 8, 1969) is an American professional poker player, active in the professional circuit since 2004. Shak is also well known for her philanthropy efforts and extensive shoe collection.

== Poker career ==
During her career, Shak has made it to two World Series of Poker final tables. At her first final table in 2005, she lost to Jennifer Tilly. She placed 8th in the 2005 World Series of Poker Ladies' event. At the 2007 World Series of Poker Shak placed 2nd in the $3,000 No-Limit Hold ‘em event.

Shak signed on as a Red Pro for Full Tilt Poker in 2007.

Shak made it to the final day of Season 5 of the European Poker Tour (EPT) finishing 31st out of almost 600 players, according to the European Poker Tour season 5 results.

As of 2024, her total live tournament winnings exceed $480,000.

== Personal life ==
Shak married to fellow poker player Dan Shak. They later divorced in 2009. On June 9, 2016, Shak married Rick Leventhal in Las Vegas.

== Philanthropy ==
Shak is the founder and chair of the Deal Me In For Jed Poker Event benefitting The JED Foundation, a non-profit organization working to promote emotional health and prevent suicide among college and university students.

Shak and ex-husband Dan co-founded the "All in" for Kids Poker Tournament in 2008. An annual charity event benefiting the Children's Hospital of Philadelphia that ran until 2017.

Shak was recognized for her contributions as a celebrity donor for the Wish Upon A Hero Foundation, a charitable organization inspired by the aftermath of Hurricane Katrina and the September 11 attacks.

== Shoe collection ==
Shak owns approximately 1,200 pairs of shoes, including 700 pairs by designer Christian Louboutin.

Shak was featured in the documentary, `God Save My Shoes`, directed by Julie Benasra

== Media appearances ==
Movies / Documentaries
Year	Title	Notes
2011	God Save My Shoes	Documentary on the intimate relationship women have with their shoes

Television
Year	Program or media outlet	Notes
2008	Poker After Dark	Season 3 Episodes 43-48
2009	myfoxla.com	"Gambling Secrets from the Pros"
2010	Fox News Channel	"Poker Face"
2010	NBC 10 Philadelphia	"Poker Champion Gives Back"
2011	The Today Show	"Poker queen antes up 1,200 pairs of shoes"
2012	Good Morning America	Shoe Addicts' Obsession Revealed in Documentary
2015	CBS Sports	Poker Night in America - Season 3 Episodes 13-19
2016	CBS Sports	Poker Night in America - Season 3 Episodes 20-21
