= Gypsy Heart (Colbie Caillat album) =

Studio album by Colbie Caillat
- Released: September 30, 2014
- Studios: Brandon's Way Recording (Los Angeles, California); Conway Recording Studios (Hollywood, California); Enemy Dojo (Calabasas, California); Kite Music Productions (Los Angeles); Magical Thinking Studios (Los Angeles); RW Studio (Los Angeles); Sleepwalker Studios (Studio City, California); Westlake Recording Studios (Los Angeles)
- Length: 44:44
- Label: Republic
- Producers: Babyface; Chris Braide; Julian Bunetta; Johan Carlsson; Antonio Dixon; Toby Gad; David Hodges; Mag; Max Martin; Ian MacGregor; Paro; John Shanks; Ryan Tedder; Rune Westberg

Colbie Caillat chronology
Christmas in the Sand (2012)	Gypsy Heart (2014)	The Malibu Sessions (2016)

Singles from Gypsy Heart
- 1. "Hold On" Released: November 19, 2013; 2. "Try" Released: June 9, 2014

Gypsy Heart is the fifth studio album by American singer-songwriter Colbie Caillat. It was released on September 30, 2014 by Republic Records. She album marked a shift in Caillat's musical direction as she sought to reinvent her sound after writing over 60 songs and being encouraged by her label to explore a more contemporary style. Blending polished pop, folk, and R&B influences, the album features production from Babyface, along with contributions from longtime collaborator Jason Reeves and producers and songwriters including Max Martin, Toby Gad, Julian Bunetta, and Johan Carlsson.

The album received mixed to positive reviews, with critics praising Caillat’s warm vocals, sincere songwriting, and polished production, while some criticized its safe approach and lack of originality. The album debuted at number 17 on the US Billboard 200, selling 16,000 copies in its first week, but failed to achieve significant international sales, marking a departure from the global success of her first three regular studio albums. "Try" was released as the first and only single from the album, replacing the previously planned lead single "Hold On," which was ultimately omitted from the standard edition.

== Background ==
Caillat wrote a full-length album in 2013, only to be told by her record company that she needed to find a new sound for her next album. She wrote over 60 songs for the album. In November 2013, she released the song "Hold On" as the intended lead single for the then-upcoming album. However, the song failed to connect with fans as well as hoped, and was ultimately left off the standard release of Gypsy Heart. To change the musical direction of the album, "Try" was selected instead to serve as the lead single for the Gypsy Heart (Side A) EP preceding the full album's release. Caillat describes the single "Try" as a "venting experience" after being told what she could and couldn't do for her own music. "To be told that your work isn't good enough – to do better, to be more like those pop artists out there that dress sexy and use Auto-tune on their voices – to be compared to someone so different, it hurt," she told Billboard. On June 9, she released Gypsy Heart (Side A), which contains the first five songs of the album. She stated to Billboard that she had wanted to release only a few songs because she thought "12 songs [were] too much to listen to at once".

== Music and songs ==
Sonically, the EP is a musical departure from Caillat's previous releases, with a more produced sound. She stated in an interview with Fuse TV that working with new producers helped her "get out of [her] comfort zone". All of the songs on Gypsy Heart (Side A) are more produced than her usual releases, except for "Try". She describes the EP as "a fun new way to put out music", and as a blend of pop, folk, and R&B music. Of her collaboration with Babyface, Caillat says that "he just knows how to make the sound so crisp, and real, and current."

== Promotion ==
Caillat embarked on the "Gypsy Heart Tour" to promote the album in the summer of 2014. The first stop was on July 17, 2014 in Saratoga, California.

=== Singles ===
"Hold On" was released originally as lead single on November 19, 2013, though the song was later omitted from the standard version of the album for uncertain reasons and was replaced by "Try" as Gypsy Heart''s lead single. "Hold On" was however included on European versions of the album. "Try" was released as the album's second single worldwide and lead single in the United States on the day of the release of the EP, and a lyric video was released the following day featuring fans, as well as female celebrities such as Hoda Kotb, Miranda Lambert, Sara Bareilles, Katharine McPhee and the members of Fifth Harmony without makeup. "Just Like That" was released as a promotional single on September 9.

== Critical reception ==
Professional ratings
Review scores
Source	Rating
AllMusic	3.5/5 stars
Digital Journal	4.5/5 stars
The Ithacan	3/4 stars
laut.de	1/5 stars
Renowned for Sound	2.5/5 stars
The Times of India	2.5/5 stars

Gypsy Heart received generally mixed to positive reviews from music critics. Stephen Thomas Erlewine from AllMusic wrote that Caillat "radiates good vibes so strongly, none of her calculated commercial considerations feels cold. And, as the sleekly modern Gypsy Heart proves, her charms are beguiling no matter her setting," giving the album 3.5 out of 5 stars and highlighted the tracks: "Live It Up", "Blaze", "Try", and "Bigger Love". Serena Weiss from The Ithacan stated that Gypsy Heart "can best be described as charming, with its hints of varying style in each song," and said that "the California singer has rendered a delightful album that will consistently intrigue listeners," while giving the album 3 out of 4 stars. Digital Journal editor Markos Papadatos gave the album even more positive review, said that "Colbie Caillat delivers on her latest album Gypsy Heart. Her songwriting is warm and sincere, and her vocals are gentle and heartfelt," and awarded the album 4.5 out 5 stars.

Kasmin Fernandes, writing for The Times of India, found that "while all the songs grow on you, they lack originality.Colbie has tremendous potential but plays it safe with this. She hasn’t managed to go beyond the usual route that new pop stars are taking. A little more experimentation would have made Gypsy Heart truly something that touches the soul. The production and finish of every song is good, making the album worth hearing... in small doses. On a less positive note, Jamie Parmenter from Renowned for Sound gave a mixed review and said that "despite the often predictable big choruses in most of the songs, the tracks are well thought out and work in their own right, it's just there’s too much unoriginality," and called it a "safe album" in which "Colbie almost seems scared to try something new and different." Magnus Hesse from laut.de summed the album as "soulless, ironed out and purely commercial."

== Commercial performance ==
Gypsy Heart debuted at number 17 on the US Billboard 200 chart in the week of October 18, 2014, with first week sales of 16,000 copies. By October 2016, the album had sold 91,000 copies in the United States.

== Track listing ==
Gypsy Heart track listing
No.	Title	Writer(s)	Producer(s)	Length
1.	"Live It Up"	Colbie Caillat; Johan Carlsson; Ross Golan	Carlsson; Mag	3:38
2.	"Blaze"	Caillat; David Hodges; Jason Reeves	Carlsson; Mag	3:07
3.	"If You Love Me Let Me Go"	Caillat; Julian Bunetta; John Ryan; Jamie Scott	Bunetta; Paro	3:41
4.	"Try"	Caillat; Kenneth "Babyface" Edmonds; Antonio Dixon; Reeves	Edmonds; Dixon	3:44
5.	"Never Gonna Let You Down"	Caillat; Edmonds; Brett James; Reeves	Edmonds; Dixon	4:08
6.	"Land Called Far Away"	Caillat; Edmonds	Edmonds; Dixon	4:47
7.	"Nice Guys"	Caillat; Carlsson; Golan	Max Martin; Carlsson; Mag	3:18
8.	"Floodgates"	Caillat; Rune Westberg; Reeves	Westberg	3:40
9.	"Just like That"	Caillat; Edmonds; Daryl Simmons	Edmonds; Dixon	3:42
10.	"Break Free"	Caillat; Christopher Braide	Braide	3:33
11.	"Never Getting Over You"	Caillat; Reeves; Liz Rose	Hodges	3:28
12.	"Bigger Love"	Caillat; Toby Gad	Gad	3:59
Total length:				44:44

iTunes Store bonus track
No.	Title	Writer(s)	Producer(s)	Length
13.	"Him or You"	Caillat; Gad; Reeves	Gad	3:47

International bonus track
No.	Title	Writer(s)	Producer(s)	Length
13.	"Hold On"	Caillat; Ryan Tedder	Tedder	3:35

International iTunes Store bonus track
No.	Title	Writer(s)	Producer(s)	Length
14.	"Him or You"	Caillat; Gad; Reeves	Gad	3:47

Target bonus tracks
No.	Title	Writer(s)	Producer(s)	Length
13.	"I Wish You Were Here"	Caillat; Gad; Reeves	John Shanks	3:15
14.	"Happier"	Caillat; Rick Nowels; Justin Young	Ian MacGregor	3:11
Total length:				51:10

Gypsy Heart (Side A) — EP
No.	Title	Writer(s)	Producer(s)	Length
1.	"Live It Up"	Caillat; Carlsson; Golan	Carlsson; Mag	3:38
2.	"Blaze"	Caillat; Hodges; Reeves	Carlsson; Mag	3:07
3.	"If You Love Me Let Me Go"	Caillat; Bunetta; Ryan; Scott	Bunetta; Paro	3:41
4.	"Try"	Caillat; Edmonds; Dixon; Reeves	Edmonds; Dixon	3:44
5.	"Never Gonna Let You Down"	Caillat; Edmonds; James; Reeves	Edmonds; Dixon	4:08

== Charts ==
Weekly chart performance for Gypsy Heart
Chart (2014)	Peak position
Belgian Albums (Ultratop Flanders)	154
Belgian Albums (Ultratop Wallonia)	166
Swiss Albums (Schweizer Hitparade)	62
US Billboard 200	17
US Billboard 200 Gypsy Heart (Side A)	32

== Release history ==
Gypsy Heart release history
Region	Date	Edition(s)	Format	Label	Ref.
Various	June 9, 2014	Gypsy Heart (Side A) – EP	Digital download; CD	Republic Records	
Various	September 30, 2014	Standard	Digital download; CD	Republic Records	
