= The Malibu Sessions =

Studio album by Colbie Caillat
- Released: October 7, 2016
- Studios: Ananda Entertainment (Hollywood, California); Broad Beach (Malibu, California); Studio City Sound (Studio City, California); Westlake Recording Studios (Hollywood, California)
- Genres: Contemporary R&B; pop; reggae; rock
- Length: 42:14
- Label: PlummyLou
- Producers: Colbie Caillat; John Shanks; Justin Young; Rune Westberg

Colbie Caillat chronology
Gypsy Heart (2014)	The Malibu Sessions (2016)	Along the Way (2023)

Singles from The Malibu Sessions
- 1. "Goldmine" Released: July 20, 2016

The Malibu Sessions is the sixth studio album by American singer Colbie Caillat. It was released on October 7, 2016, through her own independent record label PlummyLou Records. "Goldmine" was released as the lead single on July 20, 2016.

== Critical reception ==
Professional ratings
Review scores
Source	Rating
AllMusic	4/5 stars

The Malibu Sessions received generally positive reviews from music critics. Stephen Thomas Erlewine from AllMusic found that The Malibu Sessions revealed "how compromised" previous album Gypsy Heart was, writing: "Caillat feels at home [...] Such comfortable surroundings can't help but make The Malibu Sessions feel cozy, but warmth is her specialty: whether she's strumming a ballad or riding a light reggae beat, she exudes friendliness. Her greatest trick is to be cheerful while managing to never seem cloying. At her best, Caillat feels as relaxing as a lazy afternoon at the beach, and The Malibu Sessions is indeed among her best, a pure distillation of her sunny charms." Michael Smith from Renowned for Sound felt that the album "may not be Colbie Caillat’s most surprising or inventive creation to date, but it takes some of the better elements of her older music and repurposes them into a breezy, sunny collection of tracks that you’d be hard pressed to hate. The Malibu Sessions easily feels like something that needed to happen for Caillat as she shows off her more enjoyable carefree side."

== Track listing ==
No.	Title	Writer(s)	Producer(s)	Length
1.	"Gypsy Heart"	Colbie Caillat; Jason Reeves; Mikal Blue	John Shanks; C. Caillat^{[a]}; J. Reeves^{[a]}	4:41
2.	"Goldmine"	C. Caillat; Reeves; Kara Dioguardi; Taylor Berrett	Shanks; C. Caillat^{[a]}; J. Reeves^{[a]}	3:25
3.	"Cruisin'"	C. Caillat; Reeves; Danielle Leverett Reeves; Morgan Caillat	Shanks; C. Caillat^{[a]}; J. Reeves^{[a]}	3:22
4.	"Like Tomorrow Never Comes"	C. Caillat; Toby Gad	Shanks; C. Caillat^{[a]}; J. Reeves^{[a]}	3:34
5.	"Only You"	C. Caillat; J. Reeves; Rune Westberg	Shanks; C. Caillat^{[a]}; J. Reeves^{[a]}	3:16
6.	"Good Thing"	C. Caillat; J. Reeves; Shanks	Shanks; C. Caillat^{[a]}; J. Reeves^{[a]}	3:52
7.	"Runnin'"	C. Caillat; Justin Young	Young; C. Caillat	3:40
8.	"Never Got Away"	C. Caillat; Westberg; J. Reeves	Westberg	3:37
9.	"Don't Wanna Love You"	C. Caillat; Gad; J. Reeves	Shanks; C. Caillat^{[a]}; J. Reeves^{[a]}	4:04
10.	"In Love Again"	C. Caillat; J. Reeves; Dioguardi	Shanks; C. Caillat^{[a]}; J. Reeves^{[a]}	3:30
11.	"Now"	C. Caillat; J. Reeves; Blue	Shanks; C. Caillat^{[a]}; J. Reeves^{[a]}	5:13
Total length:				42:12

Notes

- ^{^[a]} signifies a co-producer.

== Charts ==
Chart performance for The Malibu Sessions
Chart (2016)	Peak position
US Billboard 200	35
US Independent Albums (Billboard)	7
