= Along the Way (Colbie Caillat album) =

Studio album by Colbie Caillat
- Released: October 6, 2023
- Genre: Country
- Length: 46:37
- Label: Blue Jean Baby
- Producer: Jamie Kenney

Colbie Caillat chronology
The Malibu Sessions (2016)	Along the Way (2023)	This Time Around (2025)

Along the Way is the seventh studio album by American singer-songwriter Colbie Caillat. It was released on October 6, 2023, under her own independent record label Blue Jean Baby Records. Produced by Jamie Kenney, the album marks Caillat's first venture into country music, blending her signature California-inspired sound with country influences. Inspired by major personal changes, including her breakup with Justin Young and the dissolution of Gone West, Along the Way explores themes of heartbreak, healing, and personal growth through an optimistic perspective.

The album received positive reviews, with critics praising its themes of growth and self-discovery, mature songwriting, and subtle country influences. It achieved modest chart success, peaking at number 85 in Switzerland, number 38 on the UK Album Downloads Chart, and number 80 on the US Top Current Album Sales chart. To promote Along the Way, Caillat released five promotional singles accompanied by music videos or visualizers, including lead single "Worth It."

== Background ==
Along the Way was conceived in the aftermath of several major life changes for Caillat, including the end of her ten-year relationship and engagement to musician Justin Young, the dissolution of their country group Gone West in 2020, and the broader disruptions of the COVID-19 pandemic. Although Caillat has described the project as a "breakup album," she intentionally approached its themes from an optimistic perspective, explaining that she wanted to show "how things can end and then begin again" and that "these are very loving" breakup songs.

Caillat began writing the album in 2020. She likened the songwriting process to a "therapy session," stating that it allowed her to openly explore themes of heartbreak, healing, gratitude, and personal growth. Several songs were inspired by her past relationship with Young, with Caillat describing tracks such as "Worth It" as celebrations of the positive memories that remain after a relationship ends. The album also markED Caillat's first solo country project, incorporating musical influences she developed after relocating to Nashville and performing with Gone West. While retaining elements of her signature California-inspired sound, Along the Way embraces country storytelling and acoustic instrumentation. She wrote three tracks on the album by herself which she cited as examples of her artistic growth as a songwriter.

== Promotion ==
To promote Along the Way, Caillat released five promotional singles accompanied by music videos or visualizers, culminating in the release of an additional music video alongside the album. "Worth It" was released as the album's first promotional single on April 21, 2023, alongside a music video. "Pretend" was released as the album's second promotional single on June 9, 2023, alongside a music video. "Wide Open" was released as the album's third promotional single on July 14, 2023. A visualizer for the song was released three days later. "Still Gonna Miss You" was released as the album's fourth promotional single on August 11, 2023, alongside a music video. "I'll Be Here", with Sheryl Crow, was released as the album's fifth and final promotional single on September 8, 2023, alongside a music video. A music video for "Meant for Me" was released alongside the album on October 6, 2023.

== Critical reception ==
Professional ratings
Review scores
Source	Rating
Entertainment Focus	4/5 stars
Spectrum Culture	3.5/5 stars

James Daykin of Entertainment Focus praised Along the Way as a "beautiful, introspective journey through the realms of love, change, and acceptance." He highlighted the album's themes of growth, resilience, and new beginnings, noting that it "celebrates endings and beginnings with nothing but gratitude and hope." Daykin particularly commended Caillat's "songwriting prowess and soulful vocals," describing the record as a "timeless and relatable listening experience" that serves as "the perfect soundtrack for life's emotional landscape." Domenic Strazzabosco of Spectrum Culture called Along the Way "a welcome return" and Caillat's "most exciting record since 2011's All of You." He praised the album's subtle country influences for breathing "new life" into her sound while remaining true to her musical roots, and commended its mature songwriting and understated exploration of heartbreak and self-discovery.

== Commercial performance ==
Along the Way achieved modest commercial success, charting in several territories. The album peaked at number 85 on the Swiss Albums Chart, number 38 on the UK Album Downloads Chart, and number 80 on the US Top Current Album Sales chart.

== Track listing ==
All tracks are written by Colbie Caillat, Liz Rose, and A.J. Pruis, except 1 (Caillat, Alysa Vanderheym, Jordan Shellhart), 7 (Caillat, Jason Reeves), 8 (Caillat, Kenneth "Babyface" Edmonds, Brett James, Reeves), and 10–12 (Caillat).

No.	Title	Length
1.	"Wide Open"	3:09
2.	"Pretend"	3:51
3.	"Worth It"	3:15
4.	"Sometimes You Need a Change"	2:57
5.	"For Someone"	3:08
6.	"Meant for Me"	3:15
7.	"Still Gonna Miss You"	3:48
8.	"I'll Be Here" (with Sheryl Crow)	4:07
9.	"Buying Time"	3:44
10.	"Blue"	3:48
11.	"Two Birds"	3:23
12.	"Old & New"	5:13
13.	"The Other Side"	2:59
Total length:		46:37

== Personnel ==
Credits adapted from the album's liner notes.

Musicians

- Colbie Caillat – lead vocals (all tracks), background vocals (all tracks)
- Sheryl Crow – guest vocals on "I'll be Here"
- Craig Young – bass (all tracks)
- Paul Mabury – drums (all tracks), percussion (all tracks)
- Kris Donegan – electric guitar (all tracks), acoustic guitar (1–12), mandolin (12)
- Adam Lester – acoustic guitar (all tracks), electric guitar (3, 6, 7), 12 string guitar (2), banjo (6, 11), high-strung guitar (7, 9), resonator guitar (13)
- Jamie Kenney – piano (all tracks), synth programming (all tracks)
- Justin Schipper – dobro (1, 2, 5, 6, 9, 11, 12), steel guitar (1, 2, 11), pedal steel guitar (3–10, 12, 13), acoustic guitar (11, 12)
- Jenee Fleenor – fiddle (2, 4, 8, 13)
- Mike Robinson – mandolin (12)

Other personnel

- Jamie Kenney – production
- Ted Jensen – mastering
- Dave Clauss – mixing
- Justin Francis – engineering
- Jenée Fletcher – engineering
- Reid Sore – editing, production assistance
- Zach Kuhlman – engineering assistance
- Patrick Stacy – creative direction, cover art, photography
- Brenton Giesey – creative direction, photography
- Brian Porizek – design, package art direction

== Charts ==
Chart (2023)	Peak position
Swiss Albums (Schweizer Hitparade)	85
UK Album Downloads (Official Charts)	38
US Top Current Album Sales (Billboard)	80
