= Try (Colbie Caillat song) =

Single by Colbie Caillat

from the album Gypsy Heart
- Released: June 9, 2014
- Recorded: 2014
- Studio: Brandon's Way Recording Studios (Los Angeles, CA)
- Genre: Pop
- Length: 3:45
- Label: Republic
- Songwriters: Colbie Caillat; Antonio Dixon; Babyface; Jason Reeves
- Producers: Babyface; Antonio Dixon

Colbie Caillat singles chronology
"Hold On" (2013)	"Try" (2014)	"Goldmine" (2016)

Music video
- "Try" on YouTube

"Try" is a song by American singer-songwriter Colbie Caillat from her fifth studio album, Gypsy Heart (2014). It was released on June 9, 2014 by Republic Records as the lead single from the album. The song was written by Caillat, Jason Reeves, Babyface and Antonio Dixon and was produced by the latter two. Lyrically, the midtempo pop ballad is about not trying to be someone else to make others happy. It was written after a session where Caillat was feeling pressure to be someone she was not, both musically and image-wise. It received acclaim from music critics, who noted it was a simple, but beautiful empowering ballad.

The song charted moderately on the US Billboard Hot 100, while becoming her highest-charting single in five years in Australia and Canada. It also became a top 40 hit in Belgium, Denmark, Norway, and Sweden. To promote the song, a lyric video including female fans and artists, such as Sheryl Crow, Sara Bareilles, Christina Perri and others, without any makeup on, to emphasize the song message, was released on June 10, 2014. Later, an official music video was released on July 8, 2014. It features the singer alongside a diverse set of women with makeup and wigs, while removing them throughout the video, ending it natural. It went viral over the internet, accumulating over 27 million views in almost two months. The song was certified platinum by the RIAA on March 20, 2015.

== Background ==
After releasing her first Christmas album, Christmas in the Sand (2012), and contributing to the soundtrack of the 2013 film Safe Haven, with the song "We Both Know", a duet with Gavin DeGraw, Caillat recorded during the summer of 2013 a new album with a "’70s vibe" with producer John Shanks. It was set to be released in November 2013; however, after meeting up with Ryan Tedder, Caillat decided to record a more "pop, up-tempo dancey" album. Caillat also worked with record producer and songwriter Kenneth "Babyface" Edmonds on the album, explaining, "We did four or five songs. I love him as a producer and writer. I just tell him any style that I’m in the mood for and we write it. It’s not like he’s pigeonholed in being an R&B producer. The first song we wrote together is a complete folk song that’s going to be on this record. It has a banjo on it! The next song is R&B-pop, and then the next one we did is completely a piano ballad, no harmonies — it’s really honest and vulnerable."

The synthpop-infused track "Hold On", produced by Tedder, was released as the album's lead single. However, the song failed to make an impact on the charts, and the album was postponed. Caillat and her label thought they should keep working and see if they got anything better. The response disappointed the singer, who was told to return to the studio to find a "new sound" for the album. "To be told that your work isn't good enough -- to do better, to be more like those pop artists out there that dress sexy and use Auto-tune on their voices -- to be compared to someone so different, it hurt," she claimed. Later, Caillat decided to release an EP, claiming that "12 songs is too much to listen to all at once. When I buy a record, I get to the fifth song, and then I don't get to really hear the rest of the record. People can listen to the first five songs, fall in love with them, get to know them, and then a few months later, have the rest of the record available for download." To promote the EP, "Gypsy Heart: Side A", "Try" was chosen to be its lead-single, being the iTunes Store single of the week from June 9 to June 16, 2014, and it would be officially released to Mainstream radio stations in early September. On October 21, 2014, the song was serviced to contemporary hit radio by Republic Records; a new "Uptempo Mix" will officially impact the format on January 13, 2015. This version was released to digital retailers on November 24, 2014 under the official name "Alex Ghenea Remix".

== Composition and inspiration ==
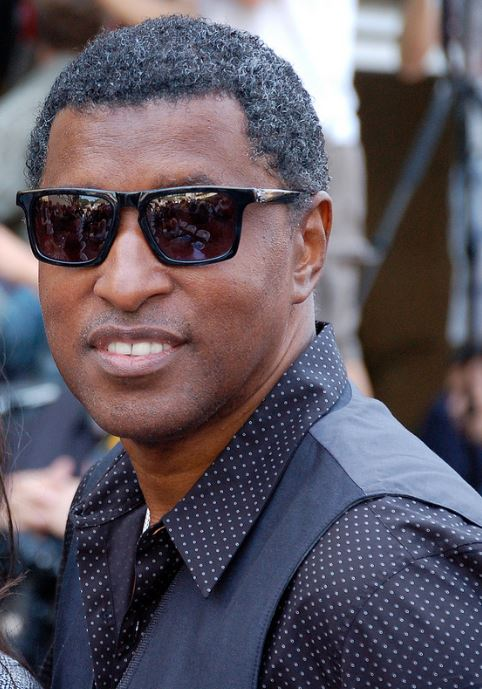
Kenneth "Babyface" Edmonds wrote with Caillat for her new album, including the single "Try".

"Try", a pop song, was written by Colbie Caillat, Antonio Dixon, Kenneth "Babyface" Edmonds and Jason Reeves, while production was done by Babyface. It is written in the time signature of common time and is composed in the key of D♭ major, with a moderately slow tempo of 70 beats per minute. Caillat's vocal range span from the low-note of A♭_{3} to the high-note of F_{5}. As noted by Holly Williams of Contact Music, the song is "full of gently plucked acoustic guitar, twinkling synths and minimal piano that adds a pleasantly uplifting touch, while Colbie's vocals are soft, yet understated - almost as if she's inviting you to sing along with her." According to Billboard, "the song resulted from a 'venting experience' for Caillat, who translated her disappointment about her scrapped album into a message of self-love aimed at women." "Put your makeup on/ Get your nails done/ Curl your hair/ Run the extra mile/ Keep it slim so they like you, do they like you?" she sings in the beginning. "You don’t have to try so hard/ You don’t have to give it all away/ You just have to get up, get up, get up, get up/ You don’t have to change a single thing," she sings in the chorus.

In an interview for Elle, Caillat confessed that the idea for the song came after going into the recording studio with "Babyface", explaining that she told him that she was getting a lot of pressure to be someone she was not, both musically and image-wise. She claimed, "Although I don’t want to do it, I’m just going to make these people happy. He started laughing, and said, we’re not going to do that. That’s not you, and that’s ridiculous of them to ask. That right there gave me the creative freedom." He said, "Let’s write about exactly what they’re asking you to do — to change yourself." We started checking off all these things that all of us girls do everyday to get ready to go out. [...] So Babyface inspired me to write this and it's all from a personal experience." Caillat explained that, "This song is not to say that we should never wear makeup, but to say that, sometimes, it's okay not to." She further told People that, "[Edmonds and songwriters told me] you don't have to try to be someone else, because people like who you are."

== Critical reception ==
"Try" earned critical acclaim from music critics. Jason Lipshut of Billboard called it an "empowering" track [...] to bestow young girls with a stronger sense of self-worth." Emileen Lindner of MTV News agreed, calling it "a super-empowering ballad." Holly Williams of Contact Music called it "a bright pop song with an admittedly overly simple melody, but the lyrics, though hackneyed and a little patronising, still have the desired effect. You can tell it's simply sung from the heart and, let's face it, Colbie doesn't even have to try." Marcus Floyd of Renowned for Sound wrote that Caillat "lyrically inspires once again with 'Try', a softer side to the release where you hear the rawness in her voice as she pleads you not to try to impress others and to just be yourself." Matt Collar of Allmusic chose the song as one of the highlights of the EP, while Markos Papadatos of Digital Journal wrote that the song "is inspirational, and it showcases her vulnerability as an artist, becom[ing] an anthem of female empowerment due to its optimistic lyrics."

== Commercial performance ==
"Try" entered the US Billboard Hot 100 chart on the issue date of July 26, 2014, at number 69. It climbed to number 55 the following week, becoming its peak position. It is also her first entry on the Hot 100 since 2011's "Brighter Than the Sun". It also debuted inside of the Top 30 at the Adult Top 40 chart, peaking at number 15. It debuted at number 22 on the Adult Contemporary chart and peaked at number 4. The song also debuted at number 67 on the ARIA Singles Chart. In Denmark, it debuted and peaked at number 13, her second song to chart after "Bubbly" (2007), while in both Australia and Canada, the song became her highest-charting single in five years, peaking at numbers 67 and 56, respectively.

== Music video ==
=== Lyric video ===
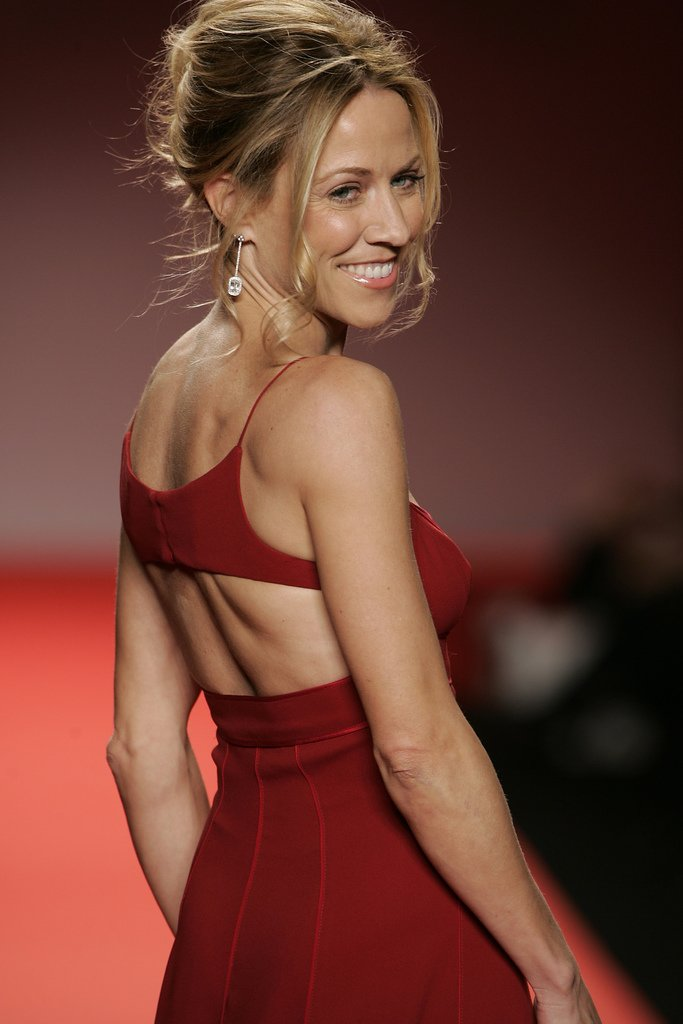
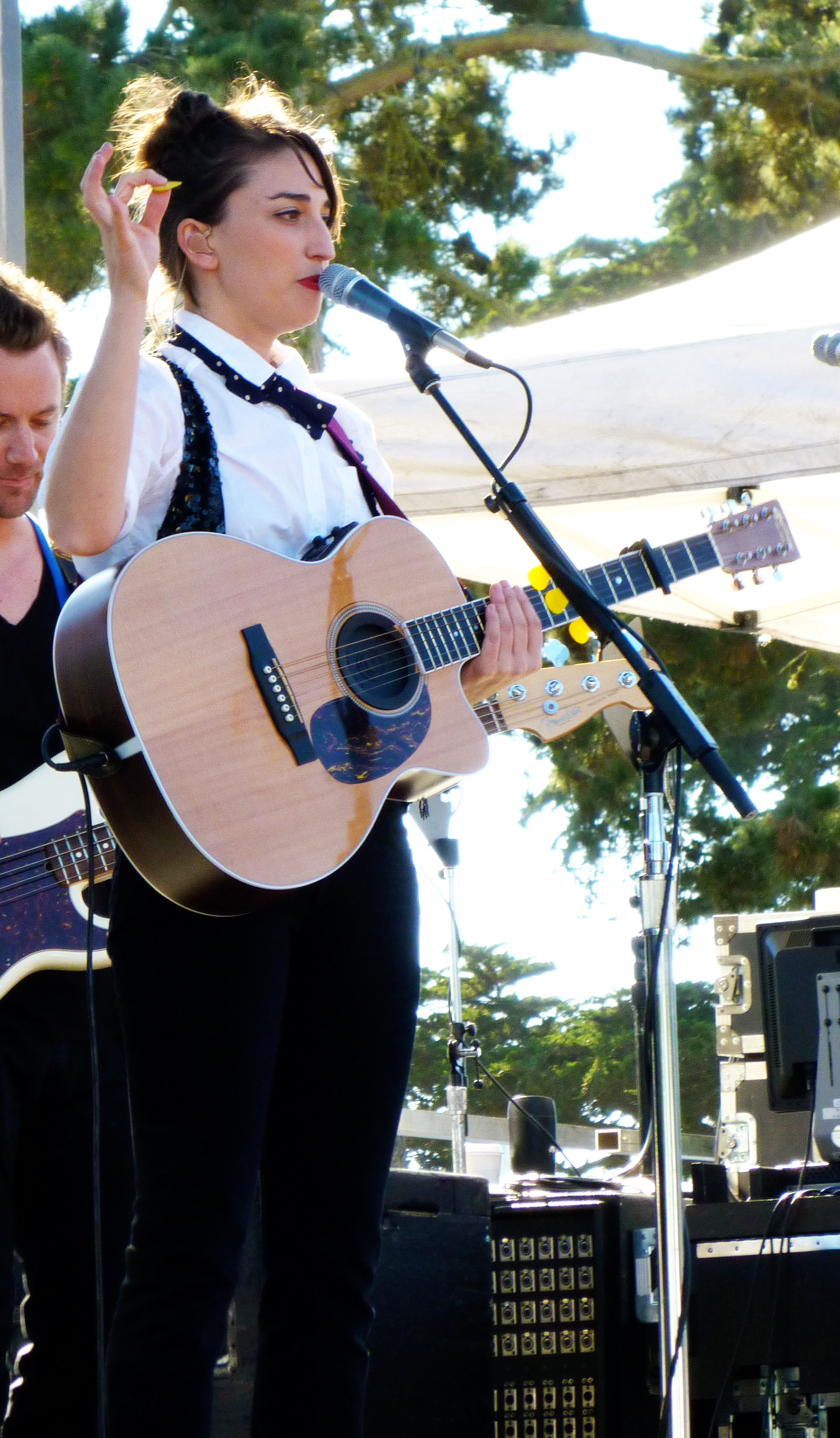
The lyric video for the song features famous artists such as Sheryl Crow and Sara Bareilles without makeup on.

On June 10, 2014, Colbie uploaded a lyric video for the song on her YouTube page. It features Caillat, her fans and famous artists like Sheryl Crow, Miranda Lambert, Kelly Osbourne, Sara Bareilles, Ingrid Michaelson, Katharine McPhee, Lady Antebellum's Hillary Scott, Natasha Bedingfield, Christina Perri, and Jessie J without makeup, in an effort to spread the message that beauty truly is on the inside. "I have a couple celebrity friends that would be more impactful for everyday people to see what we look like normally," she claimed during an appearance on NBC's Today.

Caillat commented for Elle Magazine that,

When I did the lyric video for 'Try,' and I asked some of my celebrity friends if they would send a picture of themselves, you have no idea how difficult it was. Some of them said no, some of them said they’ll send me a picture in a couple of days because they have a pimple on their chin, and they didn’t want it showing in the picture. And I was like, no, no, no! That’s good! Let’s let all of our fans know that we get them too, because otherwise they’re just think that they’re the only ones who get acne. We all get it, so let’s just kind of laugh about it together. And then some of the girls still wore makeup in the pictures because they felt like they needed to at least look – I don’t know, in their eyes, decent or something when they still look beautiful. It was so hard for them to show any degree of realness.

=== Official video ===
The music video for "Try" shows Colbie Caillat with (left) and without (right) makeup on.

The official music video premiered on July 8, 2014 on VEVO. According to Caillat,

We shot the video in reverse, we started bare, and by the end we finished with the full hair and makeup, and then reversed the film for the finished product. All of the women were amazing. My favorite was the woman who has no hair. I first saw her completely bald, no makeup, with a huge smile, she was just so happy and confident. She was so beautiful to me. And then we kept getting more hair and makeup on, and the next scene I saw where she’s in full make-up and wig, I was like, Who is this woman? She was not the same person. She still looked beautiful but it wasn’t the same beauty that I saw when she was liberated, showing who she really was. When I shot the first scene with no hair and makeup on in front of an HD camera in my face, flashed with bright lights, everyone was watching. I thought, "Oh my god, I bet they’re all looking at my blemishes, thinking that I should cover them up, or that I should put some volume in my hair." But it also felt really cool to be on camera with zero on, like literally nothing on. And then when it got to the full hair and makeup, I actually felt gross. I was just so caked on.

==== Storyline and reception ====
As explained by Zakiya Jamal of People, "it begins by showing women from all different ages and backgrounds, including Caillat herself, wearing makeup, wigs, and fake eyelashes. As the video progresses the women remove their makeup, take off their wigs or shake out their hair, and let their natural beauty shine." All the while, the women lip-sync to Caillat's vocals. As noted by Emilee Lindner of MTV News, at the end, "Caillat is looking smiley and seriously at the camera, singing the last lines, 'Don’t you like you? ‘Cause I like you.'" During its first week, the video went viral, accumulating over nine million views, surpassing the 20-million mark on YouTube/VEVO as of August 19, 2014. Robbie Daw of Idolator praised Colbie and the other women in the clip for "giv[ing] us one of the most quietly powerful visuals of the year so far." Bruna Nessif of E! Online claimed that the video "embraces natural beauty and embodies a massive amount of girl power in just four minutes." Lauren Valenti of Marie Claire wrote that "Caillat's bold experiment is a reminder that emancipating yourself from your beauty routine every once and a while [sic] can set you free — yes, even in a world filled with unrealistic beauty ideals."

== Live performances ==
Caillat had given an exclusive performance of "Try" to blogger Perez Hilton. Then she performed the track officially on Today, while also discussing the song and its music video. Later, she also performed the track on Live with Kelly and Michael (on June 9, 2014), The View (on August 12, 2014), and at the Young Hollywood Awards in addition to appearing on HLN, CBS This Morning and Extra. Later she performed at the Billboard Women Music Awards.

== Charts and certifications ==
=== Weekly charts ===
Chart (2014–15)	Peak position
Australia (ARIA)	67
Belgium (Ultratip Bubbling Under Flanders)	15
Belgium (Ultratip Bubbling Under Wallonia)	32
Canada Hot 100 (Billboard)	56
Canada AC (Billboard)	21
Canada Hot AC (Billboard)	26
Czech Republic Singles Digital (ČNS IFPI)	88
Denmark (Tracklisten)	13
Norway (VG-lista)	15
Slovakia Singles Digital (ČNS IFPI)	84
Sweden (Sverigetopplistan)	33
US Billboard Hot 100	55
US Adult Contemporary (Billboard)	4
US Adult Pop Airplay (Billboard)	6

=== Year-end charts ===
Chart (2014)	Position
US Adult Contemporary (Billboard)	30
US Adult Pop Songs (Billboard)	46
Chart (2015)	Position
US Adult Contemporary (Billboard)	19
US Adult Pop Songs (Billboard)	46

=== Certifications ===
Region	Certification	Certified units/sales
Brazil (Pro-Música Brasil)	Platinum	40,000^{‡}
Denmark (IFPI Danmark)	Gold	45,000^{‡}
New Zealand (RMNZ)	Gold	15,000^{‡}
Sweden (GLF)	Platinum	40,000^{‡}
United States (RIAA)	Platinum	1,000,000^{‡}
^{‡} Sales+streaming figures based on certification alone.

== Release history ==
Region	Date	Format	Version	Label	Ref.
Australia	June 9, 2014	Digital download Adult contemporary radio	Original	Republic Records	
North America	June 9, 2014	Digital download Adult contemporary radio	Original	Republic Records	
Germany	September 26, 2014	Digital download	Original	UMG Recordings	
United Kingdom	September 26, 2014	Digital download	Original	Universal-Island Records	
Italy	September 29, 2014	Digital download	Original	UMG Recordings	
Japan	September 30, 2014	Compact disc	Original	UMG Recordings	
North America	October 21, 2014	Contemporary hit radio	Original	Republic Records	
North America	November 24, 2014	Digital download	Alex Ghenea remix	Republic Records	
North America	January 13, 2015	Contemporary hit radio	Uptempo Mix	Republic Records	
