= Christmas in the Sand =

Studio album by Colbie Caillat
- Released: October 23, 2012
- Studio: Village Studios; Band House Studios; Revolver Studios
- Length: 42:18
- Label: Universal Republic
- Producer: Colbie Caillat; Ken Caillat

Colbie Caillat chronology
All of You (2011)	Christmas in the Sand (2012)	Gypsy Heart (2014)

Deluxe edition cover

Singles from Christmas in the Sand
- 1. "Christmas in the Sand" Released: October 15, 2012

Christmas in the Sand is a Christmas album and the fourth studio album by American singer-songwriter Colbie Caillat. It was released on October 23, 2012 in the United States through Universal Republic Records. The album includes eight cover versions of popular holiday songs and four original songs, written by Caillat along with several other songwriters. Produced by her father Ken Caillat, Christmas in the Sand features collaborations with Brad Paisley, Gavin DeGraw, Justin Young and Jason Reeves.

Upon release, the album earned generally positive reviews from music critics and peaked at number four on the US Top Holiday Albums charts. First single "Christmas in the Sand" was released through SoundCloud on October 15, 2012, followed by "Merry Christmas Baby" featuring country music artist Brad Paisley the day after. The album also has a deluxe edition, that was released internationally and through Target for the United States version that includes three bonus tracks and new album artwork.

== Background and composition ==
Caillat told Billboard her holiday album was dedicated for those whose Christmases aren't the traditional kind of Christmas, "I was like, 'Not everyone lives in the snow or cold places for Christmas, so why don't we write some songs for them to be able to relate to what their Christmas is like'". Fittingly, Caillat recorded "Christmas in the Sand" "in my bathing suit in the sunshine in southern California in the summertime...between takes of going swimming with my mom and our dogs." The album, she says had been broached by her label in the past, but with six months off at the beginning of this year she felt like it was "a perfect time to put my focus and attention on it and decide how many songs I wanted, which songs and to write songs for it." A lot of the songs I wrote for it are about how not every (winter) holiday I spent has been only in the snow," Caillat explains. "It's also been in the sun and at the beach and a different kind of lifestyle (that) not everyone has. I wanted to tap into that. It's fun to write a Christmas song from that perspective."

The album, produced by her father Ken, includes five originals and 10 holiday standards, as well as guest appearances by Brad Paisley on a rocking "Merry Christmas Baby" and Gavin DeGraw, who ad libs his way through what Caillat calls a "hilarious" version of "Baby, It's Cold Outside". Vocals recorded on Tour at Playback Recording Studio." he wrote the love song "Everyday is Christmas" with Jason Reeves and Kara DioGuardi, while "Mistletoe", composed with Stacy Blue and Mikal Blue, was released a stand-alone single in 2007. And "Happy Christmas," a co-write with Toby Gad, recalls traditional, snowy Christmases at Caillat's grandparents' home in Lake Tahoe. "I've experienced that typical kind of Christmas as well, so I wanted to write a little bit of both sides," Caillat says.

== Promotion ==
To promote the album, Caillat scheduled a week of holiday shows at the end of November and beginning of December, plus a series of TV appearances. She was a part of the CMA Country Christmas special along with another artists.

== Critical reception ==
Professional ratings
Review scores
Source	Rating
AllMusic	4/5 stars

AllMusic editor Stephen Thomas Erlewine called the album "a breezy, sunny holiday platter for those who never see a snowflake in their December. Colbie's specialty is a light touch but she actually rocks a little bit harder here than usual, [which] makes Christmas in the Sand a little livelier than either of her full-length platters, but the casual brilliance of this unassuming but thoroughly entertaining holiday album is that it has a genuine personality." Bruce G. Smith from The Seattle Post-Intelligencer found that Christmas in the Sand "offers an upbeat country sound [...] The record breaks from traditional (and boring) compilations in that it offers some new songs and some rollicking renditions of the old standards. It's not the same old renditions that have been playing for 60 years." Summing the album as a whole, Entertainment Weekly wrote: "Think less hot cocoa by the fire, more cocoa butter on the beach."

== Chart performance ==
Christmas in the Sand debuted at number 93 on the US Billboard 200 in the week of November 10, 2012 and peaked at number 41 in the week of December 15, 2012. It also debuted and peaked at number four on the US Top Holiday Albums chart.

== Track listing ==
All tracks produced by Ken Caillat.

Christmas in the Sand track listing
No.	Title	Writer(s)	Length
1.	"Merry Christmas Baby" (featuring Brad Paisley)	Lou Baxter; Johnny Moore	3:40
2.	"Santa Baby"	Joan Javits; Philip Springer; Tony Springer	2:56
3.	"Christmas in the Sand"	Caillat; Kara DioGuardi; Jason Reeves	3:48
4.	"Baby, It's Cold Outside" (featuring Gavin DeGraw)	Frank Loesser	3:19
5.	"Jingle Bells" (Target / deluxe edition)	James Lord Pierpont	3:18
6.	"The Christmas Song" (featuring Justin Young)	Mel Tormé; Bob Wells	3:18
7.	"Santa Claus Is Coming to Town"	John Frederick Coots; Haven Gillespie	3:10
8.	"I'll Be Home for Christmas" (Target / deluxe edition)	Bing Crosby	2:30
9.	"Every Day Is Christmas" (featuring Jason Reeves)	Caillat; DioGuardi; Jason	4:24
10.	"Have Yourself a Merry Little Christmas" (from A Very Special Christmas 7) (Target / deluxe edition)	Ralph Blane; Hugh Martin	3:31
11.	"Silver Bells"	Jay Livingston; Ray Evans	3:43
12.	"Winter Wonderland"	Felix Bernard; Richard Bernhard Smith	2:50
13.	"Mistletoe" (2012 re-record)	Caillat; Stacy Blue; Mikal Blue	3:50
14.	"Happy Christmas"	Caillat; Toby Gad	3:33
15.	"Auld Lang Syne"	Robert Burns; Caillat; Callaghan Smerek	3:46
Total length:			51:37

== Personnel ==
- Ken Caillat – producer, mixing, engineer
- Colbie Caillat – producer, vocals, background vocals
- Ghian Wright – engineer, additional music direction, mixing
- Greg Metcalf – photography
- Eric Berdon – additional engineer, guitars, keyboards, humm choir (only on Auld Lang Syne)
- Gregg Sartiano – additional engineer
- Chris Steffen – additional engineer
- Neal Capellino – additional engineer (only on Merry Christmas Baby)
- Tucker Bodine – additional engineer (only on Baby, It's Cold Outside with Gavin DeGraw)
- Brian David Willis – assistant engineer (only on Merry Christmas Baby)
- Eric Boulanger – mixing, mastering, violin
- Joe Zook – mixing (only on Christmas In The Sand)
- Doug Sax – mastering
- Victor Indrizzo – drums, percussion
- Tim Pierce – bass, guitars
- Sean Hurley – bass
- Greg Suran – guitars
- Jason Reeves – guitars, vocals, background vocals
- Justin Young – guitars, vocals, background vocals
- Gavin DeGraw – vocals, background vocals
- Patrick Warren – keyboards, programming
- Jamie Muhoberac – keyboards, programming
- Kim Bullard – keyboards, programming
- Michael "Smidi" Smith – keyboards
- Denosh Bennett – background vocals
- Stevvi Alexander – background vocals
- Annaliese Wolverton – background vocals
- Makepeace brothers – humm choir (only on Auld Lang Syne)
- Noah Needleman – humm choir (only on Auld Lang Syne)
- Sonus Quartet – strings
- Caroline Campbell – violin
- Kathleen Sloan – violin
- Elizabeth Hedman – violin
- Juan Miguel Hernández – viola
- Victor de Almeida – viola
- Vanessa Freebrairn-Smith – cello
- Paula Hochhalter – cello
- Sari Sutcliffe – contracting & album co-ordination
- Sandra Brummels – art direction
- Christopher Kornmann – graphic design

== Charts ==
Weekly chart performance for Christmas in the Sand
Chart (2012)	Peak position
US Billboard 200	41
US Top Holiday Albums (Billboard)	4

== Release history ==
Christmas in the Sand release history
Region	Date	Format	Label	Ref.
United States	October 23, 2012	Digital download; CD	Universal Republic	
