= Colbie Caillat =

American singer-songwriter (born 1985)

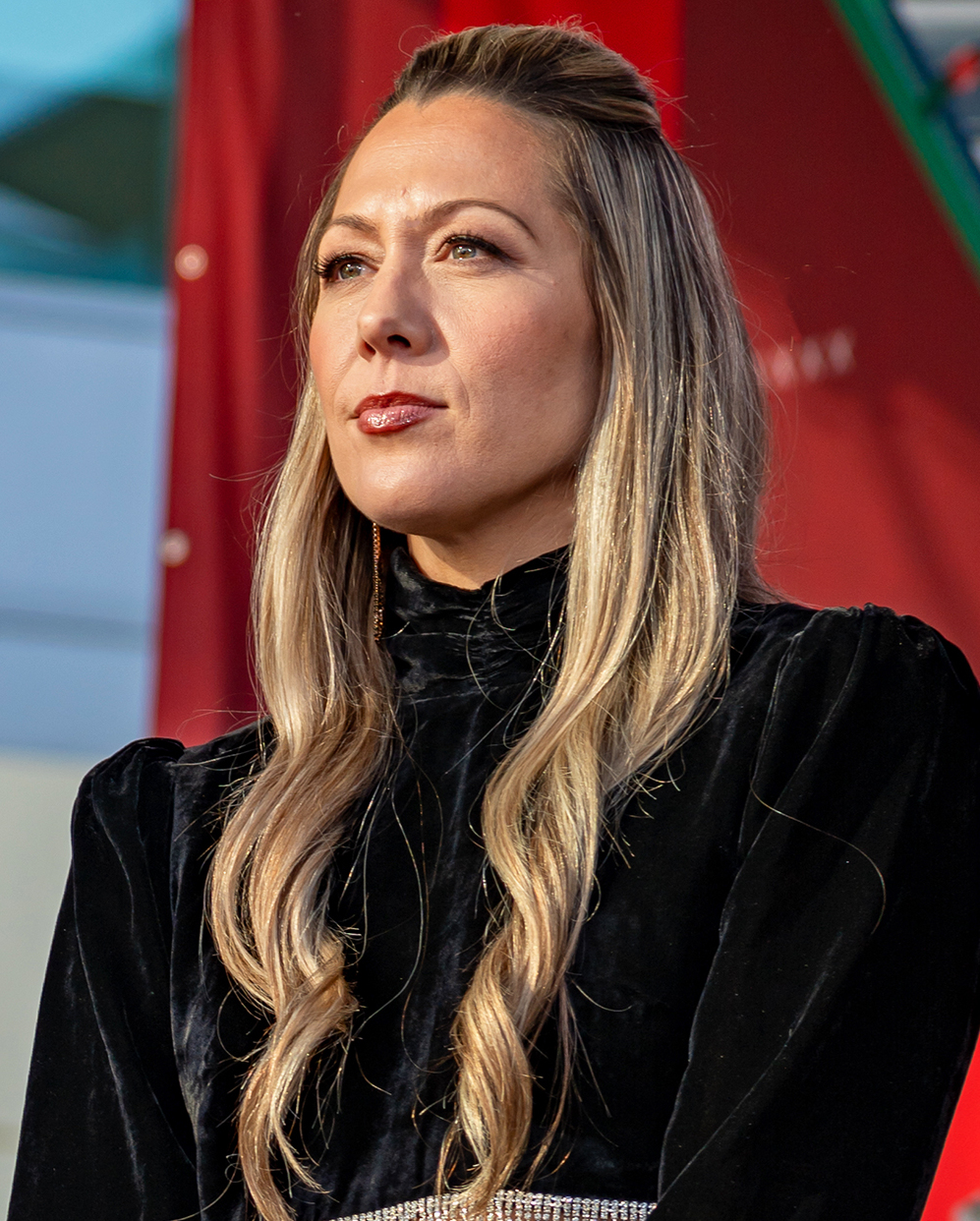
- Caillat in December 2023
- Born: Colbie Marie Caillat; May 28, 1985 (age 41); Malibu, California, U.S.
- Other name: Coco
- Occupation: Singer-songwriter
- Years active: 2004–present
- Partner: Justin Young (2009–2020)
- Father: Ken Caillat
- Awards: Full list
- Musical career
- Genres: Pop; folk-pop; pop-soul
- Instruments: Vocals; guitar; piano
- Labels: Republic; PlummyLou
- Formerly of: Gone West
- Website: colbiecaillat.com

Colbie Marie Caillat (/ˈkoʊlbi kæˈleɪ/ KOHL-bee kal-AY; born May 28, 1985) is an American singer-songwriter. She rose to fame on the social networking website Myspace in 2005.

She signed with Universal Republic Records to release her debut studio album, Coco (2007), which was supported by the singles "Bubbly" and "Realize", peaked at number five on the Billboard 200, and received double platinum certification by the Recording Industry Association of America (RIAA). At the 52nd Annual Grammy Awards, her 2008 duet with Jason Mraz, "Lucky", won Best Pop Collaboration with Vocals, her second album, Breakthrough (2009), received a nomination for Best Pop Vocal Album, and she won Album of the Year for her contributions to Taylor Swift's Fearless (2008). Furthermore, Breakthrough debuted atop the Billboard 200 and spawned the single "Fallin' for You". Her third album, All of You (2011), was supported by the single "Brighter Than the Sun", and her fourth album, Christmas in the Sand (2012), was a Christmas album. Her fifth, Gypsy Heart (2014), was supported by the single "Try". From 2018 to 2020, she was part of country music quartet Gone West.

Caillat has sold over six million albums worldwide and over 10 million singles. In 2009, she was named Billboard magazine's 94th-best-selling music artist of the 2000s.

== Life and career ==
=== 1985–2006: Early life ===
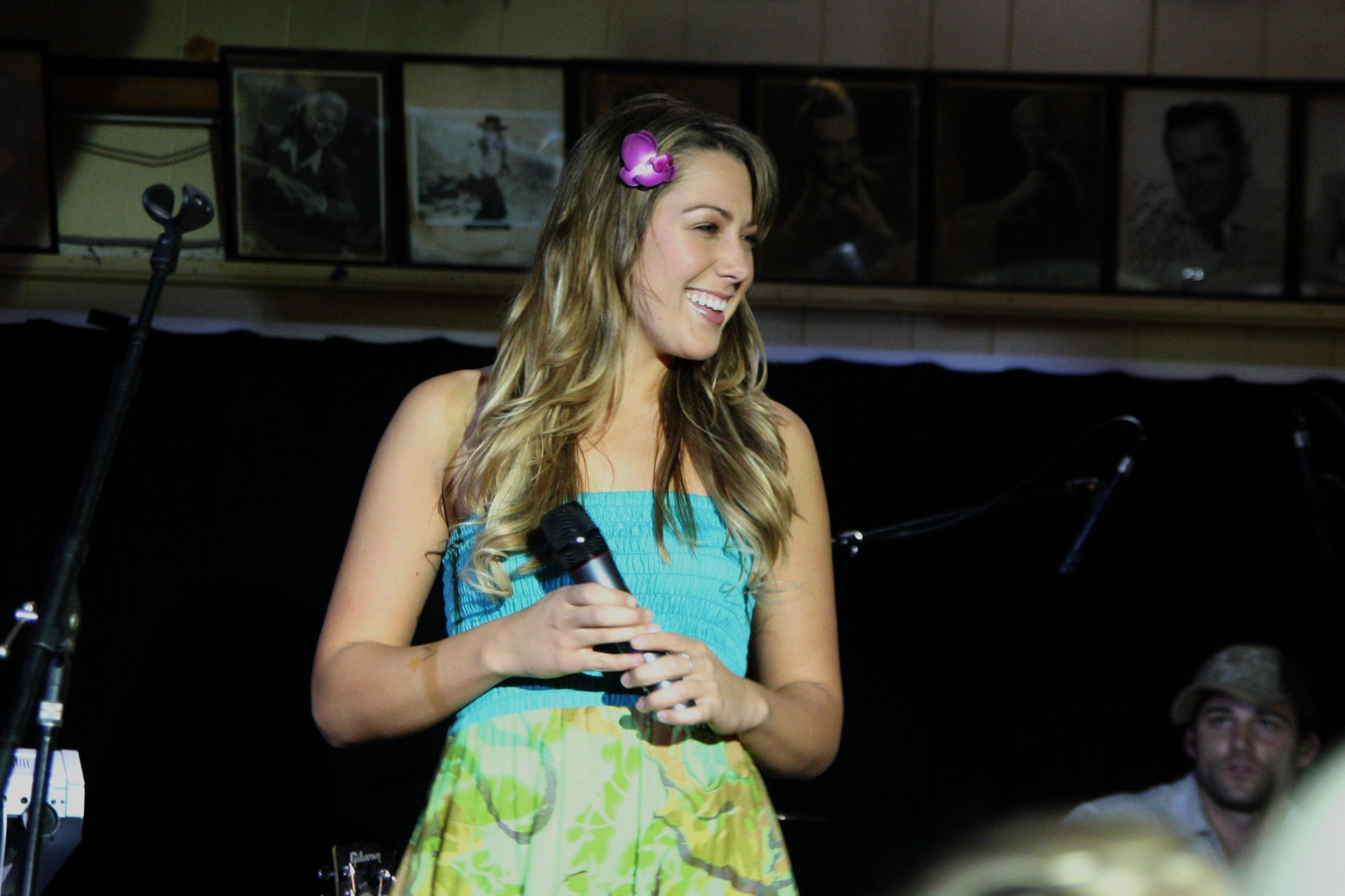
Caillat performing at The Malibu Inn, 2007

Caillat was born in Malibu, California, and grew up in Newbury Park, California. Her father, Ken Caillat, co-produced Fleetwood Mac's Rumours (1977), Tusk (1979), and Mirage (1982) albums. When she was an infant, her parents gave her the nickname "Coco", which she would later name her debut album.

Caillat took piano lessons as a child, but lacked significant inspiration until she turned 11 years old, when she became enthralled with Lauryn Hill's performance in Sister Act 2. She realized that she wanted to be a singer, and began taking vocal lessons, performing onstage for the first time in sixth grade. Since then she has covered the Roberta Flack song "Killing Me Softly", which had previously been covered by Lauryn Hill, and Hill's own "Tell Him".

Caillat soon met producer Mikal Blue, who hired her to sing on techno songs used at fashion shows. Caillat began playing the acoustic guitar at age 19, and Blue helped her record her first song.

She auditioned for American Idol in an early season (one of the first four seasons before Bubbly was released), but was rejected at the pre-audition stage and was unable to sing for the judges. The second time she auditioned for the show, she sang her own original song, "Bubbly", and was rejected once again. However, Caillat expressed gratitude at the judges' decision, saying "I was shy. I was nervous. I didn't look the greatest. I wasn't ready for it yet. I was glad, when I auditioned, that they said no."

The popularity of Caillat's MySpace profile led her to become the number-one unsigned singer in her genre for four consecutive months.

=== 2007–2008: Coco ===
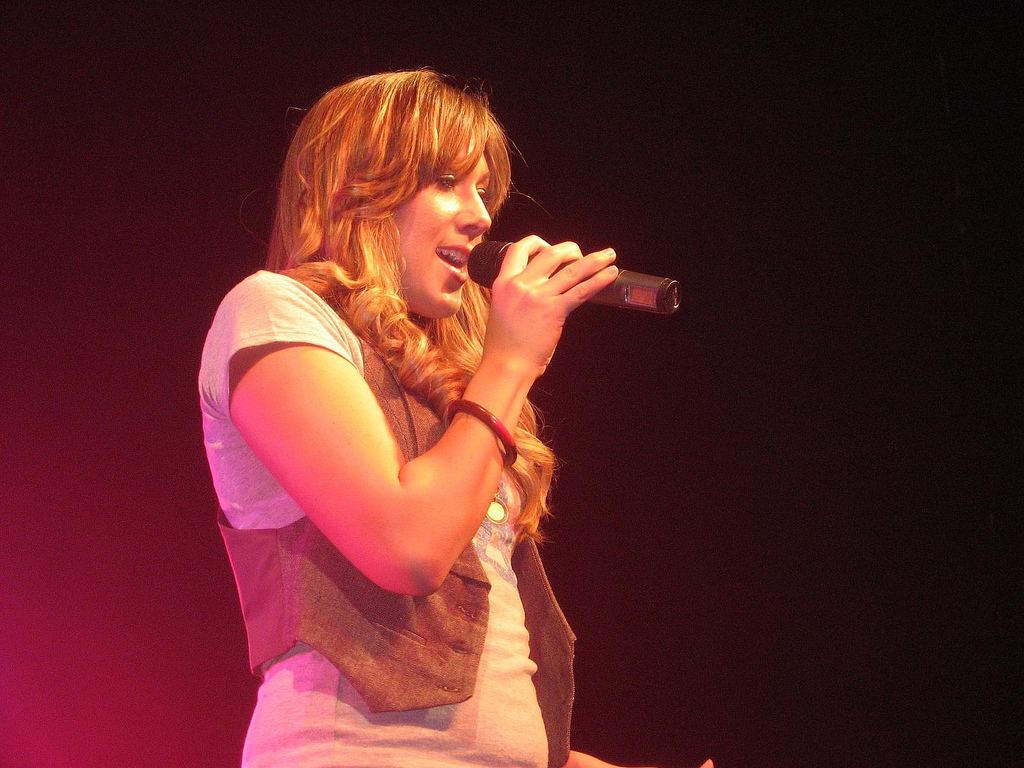
Caillat performing in Birmingham, Alabama, in November 2007

Caillat's debut album, Coco, was released on July 10, 2007, in Australia and Asia and a week later in North America. Its deluxe edition was released on September 3, 2008, in Japan and November 11, 2008, worldwide. The album was certified 2× Platinum by the RIAA with shipments to U.S. retailers of 2,000,000 units. The album's first single, "Bubbly", peaked at number five on the US Billboard Hot 100 and number two on the Pop 100. It also topped the Hot Adult Contemporary Tracks and Hot Adult Top 40 Tracks charts for 19 and 14 weeks, respectively. The single was certified platinum by the Recording Industry Association of America on December 13, 2007, with sales of more than 2.6 million downloads in the US. On November, 20, she released the Christmas song "Mistletoe" and peaked at number 75 at Billboard Hot 100. The song was the most downloaded holiday song of 2007. It was also featured in the film Baby Mama. The second single from Coco, "Realize", was released on January 23, 2008, peaking at number 20 on the Billboard Hot 100 chart, becoming her second Top 20 hit in the United States.

"The Little Things", was released as the third single in Germany on March 7, 2008, and in United States in October 2008. The single did not chart well in the US, and was her weakest charting single from the album, peaking at number seven on US Billboard Bubbling Under Hot 100. She also recorded a French translated version of this song. The original music video was released only in Europe and was shot in San Francisco. Another music video for the song was shot in Hawaii and was a prequel to "Bubbly". The fourth and final single from the album in the United States was, "Somethin' Special (Beijing Olympic Mix)", released on July 29, 2008. The song was included only in the deluxe edition. It was released to give support to the American athletes participating in the 2008 Beijing Summer Olympics, in China, and also was included on the AT&T Team USA Soundtrack. Caillat also sings on "You" by Schiller and appears in the music video. She has been involved in the soundtrack of the movie Imagine That; she and Mikal Blue cover the Beatles song "Here Comes the Sun". She is also featured in Colombian singer Juanes' album La vida... es un ratico (en vivo) in the song "Hoy Me Voy". In October, the song "Midnight Bottle" was included in the soundtrack of Brazilian soap opera Três Irmãs. She also played herself in this soap opera and performed the song. Caillat provided background vocals for and co-wrote Taylor Swift's song "Breathe", on her album, Fearless.

=== 2009–2012: Breakthrough and All of You ===
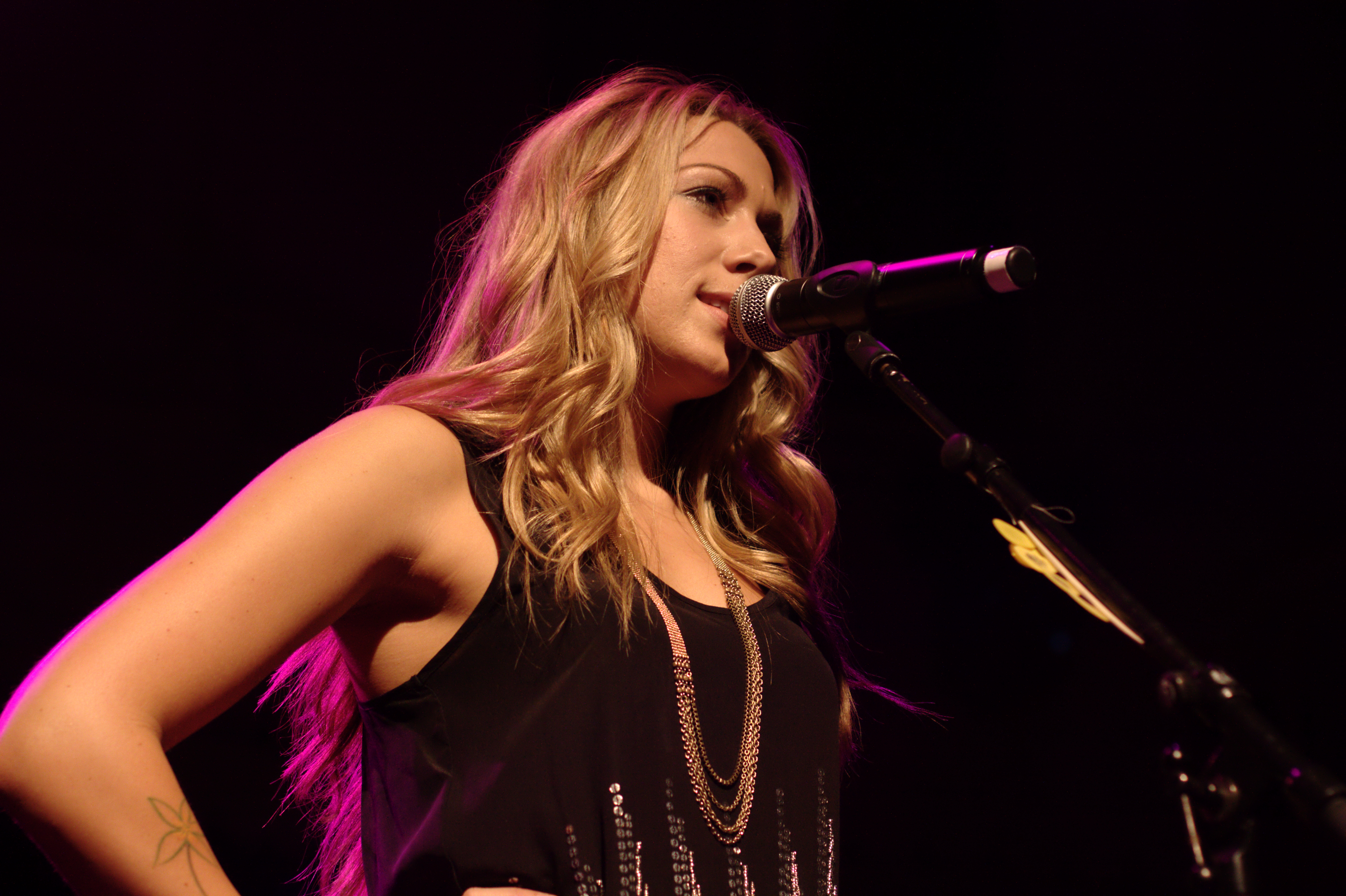
Caillat performing at the Breakthrough World Tour

On January 13, 2009, Caillat also released a duet with Jason Mraz, called "Lucky", on his album, We Sing, We Dance, We Steal Things. Caillat's second album, Breakthrough, was released in August 2009. Most of the album was co-written by Jason Reeves and features guitarist David Becker on two tracks. Becker has worked with Caillat's father Ken. Caillat had writer's block during the recording sessions, so she enlisted her friends Kara DioGuardi and Jason Reeves, and they went to Hawaii for three weeks, rented a beach house and wrote songs. Breakthrough debuted at number-one on the US Billboard 200 chart, with first-week sales of 106,000 copies, becoming her first album to debut at the top and an improvement of the first week sales of her debut album Coco (2007), which started at number five with only 51,000 copies. It was also Universal Music Group's sixth consecutive number-one album to debut at the top. It was later certified Platinum by the Recording Industry Association of America (RIAA). The first single, "Fallin' for You", was released on June 29, 2009. The "lilting" mid-tempo ballad "features an instantly catchy chorus and toe tapping melody," as defined by Melinda Newman of HitFix. It achieved chart success in the United States, reaching number twelve on the Billboard Hot 100, her second highest-charting single and her highest debut with 118,000 first-week downloads, spending fourteen weeks at number two on the Adult Pop Songs and topping the Adult Contemporary chart. Elsewhere, it reached the top-twenty in four other countries and top-forty in the remaining territories.

Initially "Begin Again" and "You Got Me" were under consideration to be the album's second single, however "I Never Told You" was released instead on February 16, 2010. It reached number forty-eight on the Billboard Hot 100 and was more successful on the Adult Pop Songs, where it peaked at number three, and on the Adult Contemporary, reaching number eleven. Caillat was recognized as BMI's songwriter of the year. In July 2010, Caillat performed "God Bless America" during the seventh inning stretch at the 2010 Major League Baseball All-Star Game. In September 2010, Caillat performed the national anthem in the season opener game of the National Football League in New Orleans and a Monday Night Football game in Chicago. In December 2010, Caillat performed at the Nobel Peace Prize Concert in Oslo, Norway. In 2010, Caillat visited the Watkins Glen, New York shelter of Farm Sanctuary, an organization she supports. Caillat's third album, All of You, was released on July 6, 2011. The set, largely produced by Greg Wells, features one guest appearance by rapper/actor Common, who graces "Favorite Song", while her songwriting collaborators include Ryan Tedder, Toby Gad, Jason Reeves and Rick Nowels. All of You debuted at number six on the US Billboard 200 with first week sales of 70,000 copies. However, it managed to top the Digital Albums Chart. As of June 2014 the album has sold 331,000 copies according to Nielsen SoundScan.

The album's lead single, "I Do", was released on February 7, 2011, and was a success, debuting at number 23 on the US Billboard Hot 100. The song gathered positive reviews from music critics. The second single "Brighter Than the Sun" was released on May 17, 2011, and reached number 51 on the Billboard Hot 100 chart. Caillat promoted the album on Today on July 12, 2011, and appeared on The Tonight Show with Jay Leno on July 14, 2011. The song "What If" debuted at number 77 on the Billboard Hot 100, due to strong digital downloads on the week of the album release. Potential singles cited in the future include "Shadow" and "Before I Let You Go". Fans chose the next single of the album via an online poll on Caillat's website, with "Favorite Song" receiving the most votes. The song was released as the third single on May 8, 2012, peaking at number 21 on the Hot Adult Pop Songs chart. Caillat appeared in the third episode of the cancelled NBC television series The Playboy Club as 1960s singer Lesley Gore. In the episode broadcast on October 3, 2011, Caillat sang Gore's 1963 hit, "It's My Party". Cast for the part in August 2011, Caillat taped her portion of the episode in Chicago.

=== 2012–2015: Christmas in the Sand and Gypsy Heart ===
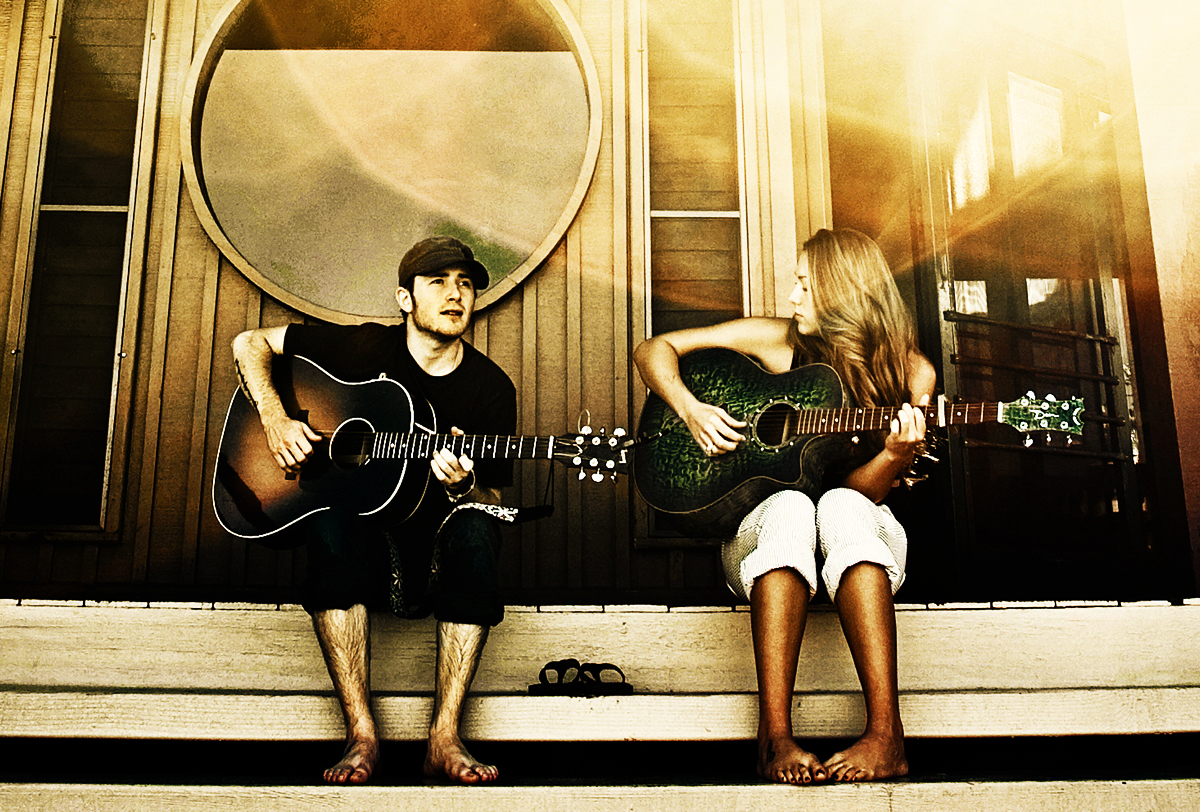
Caillat with longtime-collaborator Jason Reeves

Caillat completed a Christmas album titled Christmas in the Sand that was released on October 23, 2012. The album features collaborations with Brad Paisley, Gavin DeGraw, Justin Young and Jason Reeves. She also began working on her fourth album, set to be released after her Christmas album. In mid-2012, it was announced that Universal Republic Records was going defunct; all other artists including Caillat moved from the label to Republic Records, thus reviving that label. Caillat and Gavin DeGraw wrote the song "We Both Know" together for the soundtrack of the 2013 film Safe Haven. The song was nominated for Grammy Award for Best Song Written for Visual Media at the 2014 Grammys. Caillat sang the national anthem at the 3rd game of the 2013 World Series between the Boston Red Sox and the St. Louis Cardinals on October 26, 2013. Caillat's new single, "Hold On" was released to digital retailers on November 19, 2013. The song would be released as the lead single from the new album, but for uncertain reasons wasn't included in the domestic version, included only in international release. In United States the song was a non-album single.

"Try" was released as the Gypsy Heart album's second single worldwide and lead single in United States on June 9, 2014. It was written by Caillat, Babyface and Jason Reeves and was produced by Babyface. Caillat says about "Try", "It's this song I've had in my head my entire life about personal insecurities, imperfections, self-confidence issue." The song hit number 55 on the Billboard Hot 100 in August of that year and later went platinum in the USA. A lyric video was released June 10, 2014, featuring fans, as well as female celebrities such as Hoda Kotb, Miranda Lambert, Sara Bareilles, Katharine McPhee and the members of Fifth Harmony without makeup. The official video shows Caillat along with other women with makeup, which they remove later on in the video.

On July 2 she released a lyric-video for "Live It Up". The official lyric-video for "Never Gonna Let You Down" was released on October 25. The fourth album, Gypsy Heart, was released only on September 30, and was produced by American record producer Babyface. It features songwriting collaborations with past co-writer, Jason Reeves, as well as new co-writers and producers Max Martin, Julian Bunetta, and Johan Carlsson. The album debuted at No. 17 on the Billboard 200 for chart dated October 18, 2014, with 16,000 copies sold in the first week. The album has sold 91,000 copies in the United States as of October 2016.

Caillat co-wrote "Chasing the Sun" along with Jason Reeves and Toby Gad for Hilary Duff. The song was released as the first single for Duff's fifth album. Caillat penned a song for The Walking Dead: Songs of Survival Vol. 2 called "The Way I Was" which was included exclusively for the Walmart version of the soundtrack album.

=== 2016–2017: The Malibu Sessions ===
In 2016, Caillat parted ways with her major record label and launched her own independent label called PlummyLou Records, named after her family dogs. Caillat also moved to Nashville this same year.

On July 22, 2016, Caillat released "Goldmine", the first single from her new album, The Malibu Sessions. The album was released on October 7, 2016, and contained the unreleased title track, "Gypsy Heart", from her previous album. "Goldmine" peaked in the Billboard Adult Top 40, while The Malibu Sessions peaked in the top 40 of the Billboard 200 Albums chart. The Malibu Sessions also reached the top 10 of the Billboard U.S. Independent Albums chart, peaking at number seven.

During the fall of 2016, Caillat undertook an acoustic world tour for The Malibu Sessions. The tour continued into the summer of 2017. In 2017, Caillat also released her first-ever campaign with White House Black Market titled "Women to Women". For the campaign, Caillat recorded a cover of "We Are Family" by Sister Sledge.

=== 2018–2020: Gone West ===
During 2018, Caillat formed a band called Gone West with her fiancé Justin Young, longtime collaborator Jason Reeves, and his wife Nelly Joy. The group debuted at the Grand Ole Opry on October 26, 2018. Gone West signed with label Grayscale Entertainment.

On August 12, 2020, Caillat announced on Instagram the band had broken up.

In September 2020, Caillat was featured on the Disney+ series Becoming.

=== 2021–present: Along the Way and This Time Around ===
In 2021, Caillat rerecorded her vocals for her 2008 Taylor Swift collaboration, "Breathe," from Fearless (Taylor's Version). The rerecording was released on April 9, 2021, along with a "meditative" lyric video. Upon its release, "Breathe (Taylor's Version)" appeared on several Billboard charts.

On July 28, 2021, Caillat signed with Creative Artists Agency. In September 2021, Caillat released a cover of the song, "White Christmas", which was a collaboration with country singer Brett Young. The duet appeared on Young's album, Brett Young & Friends Sing the Christmas Classics. In December of that year, Caillat made an appearance on CMT Crossroads Christmas to perform her duet with Young.

In early 2022, Caillat embarked on the Coco Live 15th Anniversary Tour, where she performed her album Coco live from start to finish. The tour continued through the summer and into the fall. On October 21, 2022, Caillat released "Iris", a cover of the 1998 hit by the Goo Goo Dolls. The cover was featured in an ad for Kroger.

According to her official website, Caillat recorded a new album in Nashville. Her new single "Worth It" was released on April 21, 2023. She announced her new album Along the Way, due October 6, after the release of the second single of the project called "Pretend". Along the Way is her first solo country album. She released the album's third single "Wide Open" in July 2023.

Caillat's eighth studio album and first duets album This Time Around was announced on July 21, 2025. The album was released on August 29, 2025. This Time Around includes duet versions of Caillat's previous hits, three original songs, and a cover of Post Malone's "Circles".

== Artistry ==
Caillat has a contralto vocal range. Her music has been described as pop with elements of country. According to Apple Music, Caillat is best known for offering the folk-pop genre a 21st-century sound, although her music has also been described as pop-soul. Jill Renae Hicks of the Columbia Daily Tribune described her music as "sunny", frequently characterized by "beachy, ray-soaked tunes filled with bouncy guitars and upbeat percussion ... fronted by the singer’s California-drawl alto". Reuters found her style to be reminiscent of female musicians from the late-1970s, namely Karla Bonoff and Nicolette Larson, and considers her timbre and tone to be similar to that of Sheryl Crow. She has experimented with genres such as rock, hip-hop, country, R&B, and dance music, particularly on her fifth studio album Gypsy Heart. A writer for The Plain Dealer theorized that jazz influences are evident in the singer's "proclivity for pseudo-scatting".

According to several publications, Caillat was arguably the first successful music artist to be discovered on MySpace. Some journalists nicknamed her the "Queen of Myspace" due to her popularity on the platform. Caillat considers herself a songwriter first and foremost. She described songwriting as "this amazing therapy that you can do on your own, and people can relate to the songs that you write". She has said she enjoys writing in bathrooms due to their echoey acoustics, which allow her to sing softer than she would otherwise. She called Jason Reeves her favorite person to write with, and has frequently co-written with Kara DioGuardi, Toby Gad and Jason Mraz. The singer's lyrics have discussed themes such as self-empowerment, with the writer mentioning that her lyrics "all have a level of deftness ... that goes light years beyond the typical fare of I love you, and such". Reviewing a 2008 concert, a writer for Reuters called her songwriting underwhelming and generic.

Caillat has spoken about suffering from stage fright earlier in her career, an experience she wrote about in her song "One Fine Line". She was promoted in the press as a shy "online sensation who suffered from a fair share of stage fright". Critics such as Brian Passey of The Spectrum noticed she had overcome her stage fright by 2017.

== Personal life ==
Caillat was in a relationship with singer Justin Young from 2009 to 2020. The two were engaged in May 2015. They announced that they had ended their engagement in April 2020. Her song "Worth It", released in 2023, is inspired by the relationship and break up.

In 2010, Caillat posed nude for the May issue of Allure magazine, alongside Emmanuelle Chriqui, Regina Hall, Kara DioGuardi, and Jessica Capshaw.

Caillat supports various charities including Farm Sanctuary, United Service Organizations, Wish Upon A Hero, MusiCares, Earth's Call Fund, the Humane Society of the United States, and WE Charity.

== Discography ==
- Coco (2007)
- Breakthrough (2009)
- All of You (2011)
- Christmas in the Sand (2012)
- Gypsy Heart (2014)
- The Malibu Sessions (2016)
- Along the Way (2023)
- This Time Around (2025)

== Filmography ==
Television
Year	Title	Role	Notes
2008	Três Irmãs	Herself	Episode: "November 13, 2008"
2009	Saturday Night Live	Herself	Episode: "Steve Martin/Jason Mraz"
2011	The Playboy Club	Lesley Gore	Episode: "An Act of Simple Duplicity"
2011	So Random!	Herself	Episode: "Colbie Caillat"
2011	Majors & Minors	Guest mentor	Episodes: "One World – Part 1" and "Fly Away"
2020	Becoming	Herself	Episode: "Colbie Caillat"
2023	Barmageddon	Herself	Episode: "David Arquette vs. Colbie Caillat"

== Tours ==
Headlining

- Coco Summer Tour (2007)
- Coco World Tour (2008)
- Breakthrough World Tour (2009–10)
- All of You Summer Tour (2011–12)
- Gypsy Heart Tour (2014)
- The Malibu Sessions Tour (2016–17)
- Coco Live 15th Anniversary Tour (2022)

Co-headlining

- Girls Night Out, Boys Can Come Too (with Christina Perri) (2015)

Fixed special guest

- Summer Tour (John Mayer) (2008)
- Summer Tour (Gavin DeGraw) (2012)

== Awards and nominations ==
Year	Awards	Category	Recipient	Outcome
2008	Teen Choice Awards	Choice Breakthrough Artist	Herself	Nominated
2008	Teen Choice Awards	Choice Music – Love Song	"Bubbly"	Nominated
2008	American Music Awards	T-Mobile Breakthrough Artist	Herself	Nominated
2008	Billboard Music Awards	Rising Star	Herself	Won
2009	BMI Pop Awards	Songwriter of the Year	Herself	Won
2009	BMI Pop Awards	Song of The Year	"Bubbly"	Won
2009	Teen Choice Awards	Choice Music: Hook Up	"Lucky"	Nominated
2010	Grammy Awards	Album of the Year	Fearless (as featured artist of Taylor Swift)	Won
2010	Grammy Awards	Best Pop Collaboration with Vocals	"Lucky" (with Jason Mraz)	Won
2010	Grammy Awards	Best Pop Collaboration with Vocals	"Breathe" (with Taylor Swift)	Nominated
2010	Grammy Awards	Best Pop Vocal Album	Breakthrough	Nominated
2010	People's Choice Awards	Favorite Music Collaboration	"Lucky" (with Jason Mraz)	Nominated
2014	Grammy Awards	Best Song Written for Visual Media	"We Both Know"	Nominated
2015	MTV Video Music Awards	Best Video with a Message	"Try"	Nominated
2016	BMI Pop Awards	Award-Winning Song	"Try"	Won

Awards and achievements
Preceded by —	Billboard Rising Star Award; 2008	Succeeded by Lady Gaga
