= Rick Leventhal =

American news reporter

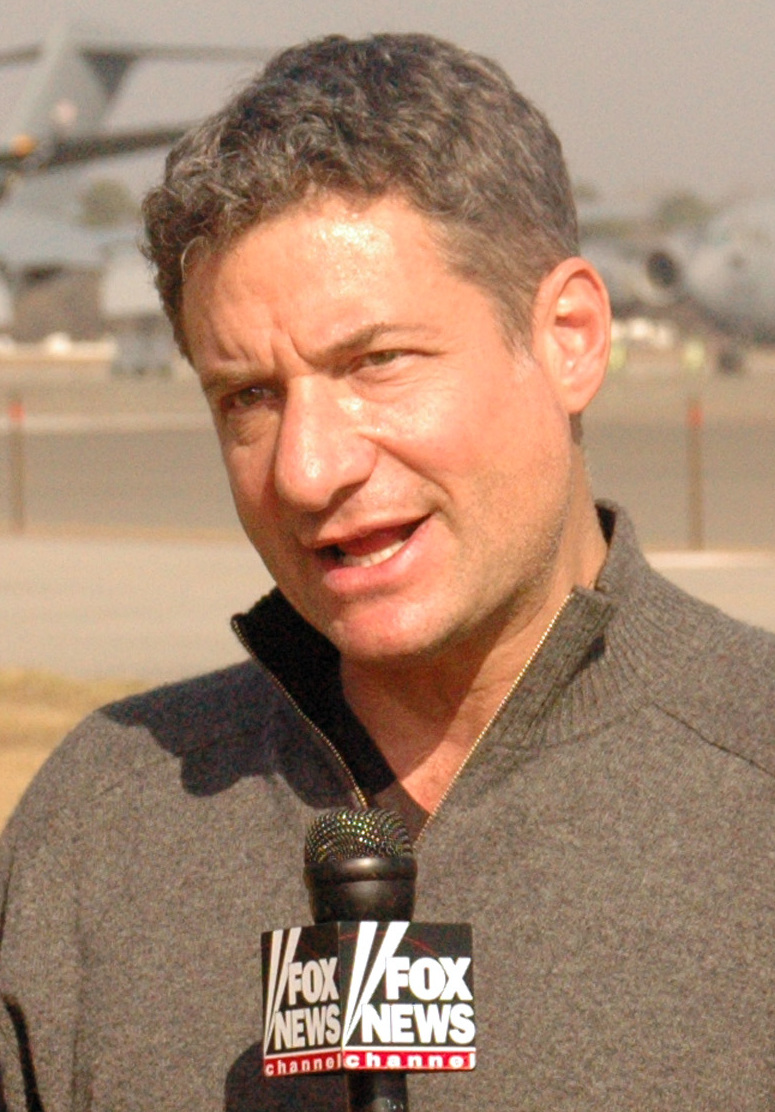
- Leventhal in 2010
- Born: Richard Gary Leventhal; January 24, 1960 (age 66); Christian County, Kentucky, U.S.
- Education: American University
- Occupations: Reporter, television presenter
- Years active: 1987–present
- Height: 5 ft 5 in (1.65 m)
- Spouses: Penny Daniels (divorced); Beth Shak (m. 2016–2017) Kelly Dodd (m. 2020)
- Children: 2
- Website: https://www.newsmaxtv.com/rickleventhal

Richard Gary Leventhal (born January 24, 1960) is an American reporter. Since 2024, he hosts The Leventhal Report on Newsmax2. Previously, he was a senior correspondent for Fox News Channel from June 1997 to June 2021. Before joining Fox, he spent 10 years in local news, reporting and anchoring in markets including Columbia, South Carolina; Spartanburg, South Carolina; West Palm Beach, Florida; Miami; Chicago; and New York City. He is a graduate of American University in Washington, D.C., with a B.A. in broadcast journalism.

== Career ==
Leventhal has been to war zones nearly two dozen times, including five trips to Iraq, four to Afghanistan, eight to Israel (including multiple journeys to the West Bank and Gaza), tours of Albania, and Macedonia during the war in Kosovo and two trips to Libya in 2011. In 2003, Leventhal spent nine weeks in Kuwait and Iraq, embedded with the United States Marine Corps' 3rd L.A.R., crossing the border and advancing to the outskirts of Baghdad, where he joined the Sinners and Saints of the 2nd Battalion, 23rd Marines. He was one of the first reporters on the scene at the World Trade Center during the September 11 attacks, before the towers fell to the ground. He traveled to Bahrain and Afghanistan later that year, embedding with Marines at Camp Rhino and Kandahar Airport for the launch of the War on Terror.

More recently he provided live coverage of flooding in Louisiana, the killing of Osama bin Laden and the 10 year commemoration of the September 11 attacks. He spent significant time covering 2010's oil spill in the Gulf of Mexico and has been dispatched to numerous natural disasters over 24 years of reporting, riding out major hurricanes including Katrina, Rita, Andrew, and Hugo. He went to Haiti for the devastating earthquake in 2010 and to Vatican City to cover the death and funeral of Pope John Paul II and the selection of his successor and was live on scene for The Miracle on the Hudson and later, Captain "Sully" Sullenberger's return to flight. He also recently took a ride in an F-15 with the Massachusetts Air National Guard.

== Biography ==
Leventhal is a younger son of Dr. Allan Leventhal, a retired psychologist in Silver Spring, Maryland, and Carol Leventhal, the retired director of Greenbelt Cares in Greenbelt, Maryland. He is second of three siblings. He has an older brother, Scott Leventhal (born 1958), and a sister, Leigh (born 1963). He completed his high school education in Montgomery Blair High School in Silver Spring in 1978.

== Personal life ==
Leventhal was married to Penny Daniels, who was on-air reporter for WSVN-TV in Miami and WFLD-TV in Chicago. He and Daniels are divorced. They have two daughters. Leventhal later eloped with Beth Shak; they were married on June 9, 2016 in Las Vegas. Leventhal and Shak divorced in 2017. In 2020, Leventhal married Kelly Dodd, star of The Real Housewives of Orange County.
