= Hold On (Colbie Caillat song) =

Single by Colbie Caillat

from the album Gypsy Heart
- Released: November 19, 2013
- Studio: Doppler Studios (Atlanta, GA); South Beach Studios (Miami, FL)
- Length: 3:35
- Label: Republic
- Songwriter(s): Colbie Caillat; Ryan Tedder
- Producer(s): Ryan Tedder

Colbie Caillat singles chronology
"Christmas in the Sand" (2012)	"Hold On" (2013)	"Try" (2014)

Music video
- "Hold On" on YouTube

"Hold On" is a song written and recorded by American singer-songwriter Colbie Caillat. It was co-written and produced by Ryan Tedder, who had previously collaborated with Caillat on her 2011 single "Brighter Than the Sun". The song was released to digital retailers through Republic Records on November 19, 2013 originally as Gypsy Heart's lead single. However, in the end, the song was only included as an international bonus track on the album and it was later announced that "Try" was the lead single of Gypsy Heart. Upon its release, "Hold On" was generally well received by critics, who complimented the new musical direction.

== Background ==
Caillat worked with "Brighter Than the Sun" collaborator Ryan Tedder on the song, and made a conscious effort to explore new musical territory. "[The song] lets people know that there aren't any boundaries," Caillat said of "Hold On". "It's always good to grow as an artist." In an interview with Billboard, Tedder called the song "a game changer" for Caillat, noting "it's gonna shock people." Tedder suggested the song "might be one of the biggest records [he's] done in years," while Republic Records co-founder Monte Lipman enthused to Billboard that "Hold On" was possibly "the best record of [Caillat's] career and something [they're] excited about."

== Critical reception ==
Music blog POP! Goes the Charts gave the song a mixed review in which they pointed out the "stale and tired sounding" lyrics, while also praising the "explosive chorus" and crossover appeal. Billboard critic, Jonathan Nguyen, was more positive of the song: "While the lyrics run stale and hackneyed, Tedder lends his OneRepublic touch to the heavily Florence And The Machines-inspired anthemic track that soars on a bombastic arrangement of layered orchestral crescendos. The result is something that touches the soul". Robbie Daw of Idolator responded positively to the single's radio-friendliness: "with its oh-oh-ohs on the chorus, minimal lyrics and pleasant instrumentation, who knows — this all just might be repetitive enough to work its way into radio listeners’ brains to the point where it becomes the singer's biggest hit to-date." He also singled out Caillat's "emotional vocal delivery" on the track and compared it favorably to the works of popular contemporaries Katy Perry, Kelly Clarkson, and Leona Lewis.

== Charts ==
Weekly chart performance for "Hold On"
Chart (2013–14)	Peak position
Canada (Canadian Hot 100)	67
Canada AC (Billboard)	21
Canada Hot AC (Billboard)	38
New Zealand (Recorded Music NZ)	25
South Korea (Gaon)	191
US Bubbling Under Hot 100 Singles (Billboard)	4
US Adult Contemporary (Billboard)	18
US Adult Pop Airplay (Billboard)	13
