= Wish Upon A Hero =

American social networking service

Wish Upon a Hero is a social helping network in the United States that connects those in need with people who are willing to help.

== History and organization background ==
Wish Upon A Hero was conceived by Dave Girgenti shortly after the September 11 attacks as a means to connect people in need after major disasters. After witnessing the aftermath of Hurricane Katrina, Girgenti worked to develop the Wish Upon a Hero web community. The website launched in September 2007 and is considered the first crowdfunding network for the Web 2.0 era. The social networking website is free and designed to help anyone in need. The website works by connecting wishers with wish grantors; people can post up to three wishes at a time to the website; grantors can grant whatever wishes they choose. These wishes can range from relatively small to large, such as words of encouragement or financial assistance. To date, more than 100,000 wishes have been granted through the site.

=== Wish Upon a Hero Foundation ===
The Wish Upon A Hero Foundation is a 501(c)(3) non-profit organization that supports the wish granting efforts of individuals and organizations. Established in June 2008 as a mechanism to raise money for larger wishes that were not being granted on the Wish Upon a Hero website, the Foundation accepts corporate donations and is eligible to receive government grants. In 2011, the Wish Upon a Hero Foundation sponsored Iraq War veteran in the "Hike for our Heroes" as he hiked across the U.S. to raise money for military families in need.

==== Foundation programs ====
===== Divine 9 golf fundraiser =====
The Divine 9 golf fundraiser is an annual celebrity pro-am golf championship benefiting people and families with blood cancer. Since 2004, Divine 9 has raised more than $1 million toward leukemia and lymphoma research. At the 2010 event, Divine 9 granted a 'wedding' wish to a leukemia patient who posted her wish for a dream wedding on the Wish Upon A Hero website.
