= Justin Young (singer, born 1978) =

American singer-songwriter

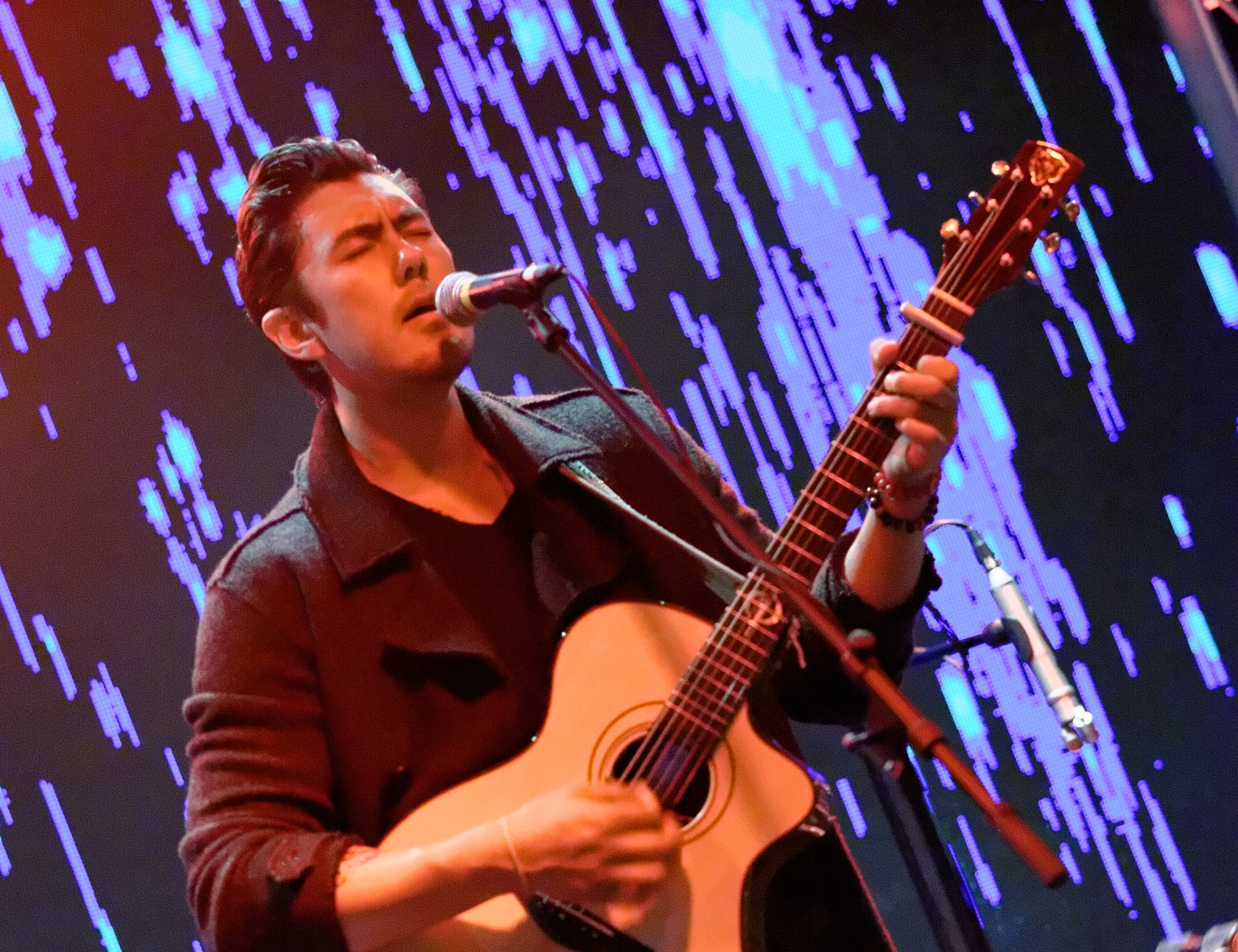
- Young performing in 2014

Background information
- Born: Justin Kawika Young; August 7, 1978 (age 47)
- Origin: Hawaii, U.S.
- Genres: Pop; pop rock; folk; soul; acoustic
- Years active: 1996–present
- Formerly of: Gone West

Justin Kawika Young (born August 7, 1978) is an American singer on the contemporary Hawaiian music scene.

Young toured with singer and then-fiancée Colbie Caillat, as lead guitarist and backup singer of the band Gone West. He also opened for Cassadee Pope of Hey Monday during her first solo acoustic tour in early 2012.

== Music career ==
After winning first place in a songwriting contest in 1995, Young was given the opportunity to record a local album in Hawaii. Young played keyboards, guitar, and ukulele, and wrote six of the ten songs on the record.

In March 1996, Young's debut album, No Better Time Than Now, released at number three at Tower Records for Hawaiian albums and remained in the top ten for six weeks. Three of Young's original songs were released, and each spent several weeks as one of the five most requested songs of the day on local radio stations. While promoting his album, Young performed throughout Hawaii, including a performance at the Waikiki Shell in front of thousands while opening for the national reggae group, Big Mountain.

In September 1997, Young released Soothe You. The album produced four number one radio hits in Hawaii. At the end of the year Young was picked by one radio station as the number one new artist of 1997. He also received three Hawaiian Music Awards including Best Performance By A Rhythm & Blues Artist, New Artist of the Year, and Honorable Recognition for his version of the classic song "Crazy Love".

Young's third album, My Eyes Adore You, released in 1998, includes an acoustic ballad called "Was It Loneliness", and a Hawaiian falsetto song inspired by his home called "E Kailua E". In addition, the album includes a cover of John Denver's "Leaving On A Jet Plane", new lyrics to Frankie Vallie's classic "My Eyes Adore You", and a collaboration with local recording group Pure Heart.

Between 2000 and 2003, Young released five more albums: Justin & Friends Collection, Y2J, The Dreaming Kind, Postcard, and One Foot on Sand.

Young performed the national anthem at the White House 2011 Easter Egg Roll with Colbie Caillat. Young's mother, Jan Young, the principal of the American School Riyadh, traveled to watch the performance. Caillat and Young are strong supporters of the group Farm Sanctuary.

On January 10, 2012, Young announced via his Facebook page that he would be opening for Cassadee Pope of Hey Monday for part of her first solo acoustic tour in early 2012. They also introduced a song they co-wrote, titled "Lunatic". During the Summer of 2012, Justin Young joined Colbie Caillat and Gavin DeGraw as a special guest on DeGraw's national tour.

== Personal life ==
Young dated Colbie Caillat from 2009 to 2020. At a show in Aspen, Colorado, in September 2014, Caillat sang "Lucky" with Young and then told the audience that the couple had just celebrated their five-year anniversary. The two were engaged in May 2015. On April 2, 2020, Young and Caillat announced the end of their engagement and 10-year relationship.

== Discography ==
- No Better Time Than Now (1995)
- Soothe You (1997)
- My Eyes Adore You (1998)
- Justin and Friends Collection (2000)
- Y2J (2000)
- The Dreaming Kind (2001)
- Postcard (2003)
- One Foot on Sand (2003)
- The Very Best Of (2004)
- Demo Sessions... (2005)
- Unplugged (2006)
- All Attached (2007)
- EP (2012)
- Makai (2013)
- The Expanse The Collector's Edition soundtrack (contributor, 2019)
  - "Tighten Up (Belter Version)" (cover)
- Back to the Blue (2022)
