= List of Billboard number-one dance singles of 1988 =

Billboard magazine compiled the top-performing dance singles in the United States on the Hot Dance Music Club Play chart and the Hot Dance Music 12-inch Singles Sales chart. Premiered in 1976, the Club Play chart ranked the most-played singles on dance club based on reports from a national sample of club DJs. The 12-inch Singles Sales chart was launched in 1985 to compile the best-selling dance singles based on retail sales across the United States.

== Charts history ==
Chart history
Issue date	Hot Dance Music Club Play		Hot Dance Music 12-inch Singles Sales		Ref.
Issue date	Title	Artist(s)	Title	Artist(s)	Ref.
January 2	"So Emotional"	Whitney Houston	"System of Survival" (Remix)	Earth, Wind & Fire	
January 9	"I'm Beggin' You"	Supertramp	"System of Survival" (Remix)	Earth, Wind & Fire	
January 16	"Never Gonna Give You Up"	Rick Astley	"Never Gonna Give You Up"	Rick Astley	
January 23	"What Have I Done to Deserve This?"	Pet Shop Boys and Dusty Springfield	"Never Gonna Give You Up"	Rick Astley	
January 30	"The Way You Make Me Feel"	Michael Jackson	"Never Gonna Give You Up"	Rick Astley	
February 6	You Can Dance (all cuts)	Madonna	"Never Gonna Give You Up"	Rick Astley	
February 13	"Some Kind of Lover"	Jody Watley	"Some Kind of Lover" (Remix)	Jody Watley	
February 20	"I Want to Be Your Property"	Blue Mercedes	"Some Kind of Lover" (Remix)	Jody Watley	
February 27	"I Want to Be Your Property"	Blue Mercedes	"Some Kind of Lover" (Remix)	Jody Watley	
March 5	"I Want to Be Your Property"	Blue Mercedes	"Tramp" / "Push It"	Salt-N-Pepa	
March 12	"I Want to Be Your Property"	Blue Mercedes	"Tramp" / "Push It"	Salt-N-Pepa	
March 19	"Thinking of You"	Earth, Wind & Fire	"Girlfriend"	Pebbles	
March 26	"Thinking of You"	Earth, Wind & Fire	"Perfect Lover"	Company B	
April 2	"Don't Look Any Further"	Kane Gang	"Father Figure"	George Michael	
April 9	"Pink Cadillac"	Natalie Cole	"Thinking of You" (Remix)	Earth, Wind & Fire	
April 16	"Pink Cadillac"	Natalie Cole	"Don't Make a Fool of Yourself" (Remix)	Stacey Q	
April 23	"Prove Your Love"	Taylor Dayne	"Out of the Blue" (Remix)	Debbie Gibson	
April 30	"Blue Monday 1988"/ "Touched by the Hand of God"	New Order	"Nightime" (Remix)	Pretty Poison	
May 7	"Adventure"	Eleanor	"Nightime" (Remix)	Pretty Poison	
May 14	"Instinctual"	Imagination	"Naughty Girls" (Remix) / "I Surrender (To the Spirit of the Night)"	Samantha Fox	
May 21	"Like a Child"	Noel	"Nite and Day"	Al B. Sure!	
May 28	"Together Forever"	Rick Astley	"Just Got Paid"	Johnny Kemp	
June 4	"Divine Emotions"	Narada	"Just Got Paid"	Johnny Kemp	
June 11	"The Promise"	When in Rome	"Just Got Paid"	Johnny Kemp	
June 18	"Just Got Paid"	Johnny Kemp	"Mercedes Boy"	Pebbles	
June 25	"Trouble"	Nia Peeples	"Mercedes Boy"	Pebbles	
July 2	"Theme from S-Express"	S'Express	"Supersonic"	J.J. Fad	
July 9	"Theme from S-Express"	S'Express	"Supersonic"	J.J. Fad	
July 16	"What's on Your Mind (Pure Energy)"	Information Society	"Sayin' Sorry (Don't Make It Right)"	Denise Lopez	
July 23	"What's on Your Mind (Pure Energy)"	Information Society	"Sayin' Sorry (Don't Make It Right)"	Denise Lopez	
July 30	"Beat Dis"	Bomb the Bass	"The Right Stuff"	Vanessa Williams	
August 6	"K.I.S.S.I.N.G."	Siedah Garrett	"The Right Stuff"	Vanessa Williams	
August 13	"The Right Stuff"	Vanessa Williams	"K.I.S.S.I.N.G."	Siedah Garrett	
August 20	"Love Will Save the Day"	Whitney Houston	"Shake Your Thang"	Salt-N-Pepa	
August 27	"Say It's Gonna Rain"	Will to Power	"Shake Your Thang"	Salt-N-Pepa	
September 3	"Say It's Gonna Rain"	Will to Power	"Monkey" (Remix)	George Michael	
September 10	"Never Let You Go"	Sweet Sensation	"Monkey" (Remix)	George Michael	
September 17	"Monkey"	George Michael	"Monkey" (Remix)	George Michael	
September 24	"Monkey"	George Michael	"Never Let You Go"	Sweet Sensation	
October 1	"Sendin' All My Love"	The Jets	"Never Let You Go"	Sweet Sensation	
October 8	"Got a New Love"	Good Question	"Never Let You Go"	Sweet Sensation	
October 15	"Big Fun"	Inner City	"Never Let You Go"	Sweet Sensation	
October 22	"Spy in the House of Love"	Was (Not Was)	"Chains of Love"	Erasure	
October 29	"Spy in the House of Love"	Was (Not Was)	"Big Fun"	Inner City	
November 5	"In the Name of Love '88"	Thompson Twins	"Big Fun"	Inner City	
November 12	"Break 4 Love"	Raze	"Big Fun"	Inner City	
November 19	"Just Wanna Dance"/"Weekend"	The Todd Terry Project	"Break 4 Love"	Raze	
November 26	"Out of Time"	Noel	"Break 4 Love"	Raze	
December 3	"I Don't Want Your Love"	Duran Duran	"The Way You Love Me"	Karyn White	
December 10	"The Great Commandment"	Camouflage	"The Way You Love Me"	Karyn White	
December 17	"Hustle! (To the Music...)"	The Funky Worm	"Don't Rock The Boat"	Midnight Star	
December 24	"The Great Commandment"	Camouflage	"Tumblin' Down"	Ziggy Marley & The Melody Makers	
December 31	"The Great Commandment"	Camouflage	"Tumblin' Down"	Ziggy Marley & The Melody Makers	

== See also ==
- 1988 in music
- List of Billboard Hot 100 number ones of 1988
