= Never Let You Go =

Never Let You Go may refer to be:

- Never Let You Go (album), by Rita Coolidge, 1983
- "Never Let You Go" (Dima Bilan song), representing Russia at Eurovision 2006
- "Never Let You Go" (Evermore song), 2007
- "Never Let You Go" (Jason Derulo and Shouse song), 2022
- "Never Let You Go" (Justin Bieber song), 2010
- "Never Let You Go" (Mando song), representing Greece at Eurovision 2003
- "Never Let You Go" (New Kids on the Block song), 1994
- "Never Let You Go" (Rudimental song), 2015
- "Never Let You Go" (Slushii song), 2019
- "Never Let You Go" (Sweet Sensation song), 1988
- "Never Let You Go" (Third Eye Blind song), 2000
- "Never Let You Go: Shindemo Hanasanai", a song by 2AM, 2012
- "Never Let You Go", a song by Colbie Caillat from Breakthrough, 2009
- "Never Let You Go", a song by F.Cuz, 2011
- "Never Let You Go", a song by Julian Lennon from Everything Changes
- "Never Let You Go", a song by Kygo from Kids in Love, 2017
- "Never Let You Go", a song by White Lion from Return of the Pride, 2008
- "Never Let You Go", a song by Ideal from their self-titled album, 1999

== See also ==
- "Never Ever Let You Go", a song by Rollo & King, representing Denmark at Eurovision 2001
- Never Gonna Let You Go (disambiguation)
- Never Let Me Go (disambiguation)
