= Like a Child =

Like a Child may refer to:

- "Like a Child" (Jars of Clay song), 1995
- "Like a Child" (Noel song), 1988
- "Like a Child" (Julie Rogers song), 1964
