= Never Let Me Go =

Never Let Me Go may refer to:

== Film and literature ==
- Never Let Me Go (1953 film), a romance starring Clark Gable and Gene Tierney
- Never Let Me Go (novel), a 2005 novel by Kazuo Ishiguro
  - Never Let Me Go (2010 film), based on the novel
- Never Let Me Go (TV series), a 2022 Thai TV series

== Music ==
=== Albums ===
- Never Let Me Go (Placebo album), 2022
- Never Let Me Go, a 2010 album by Mark Murphy
- Never Let Me Go (Luther Vandross album), 1993
- Never Let Me Go (Stanley Turrentine album), 1963

=== Songs ===
- "Never Let Me Go" (Johnny Ace song), 1954
- "Never Let Me Go" (The Black Sorrows song), 1990
- "Never Let Me Go" (Florence and the Machine song), 2011
- "Never Let Me Go", 2023 song by Depeche Mode, from the album Memento Mori
- "Never Let Me Go", 2018 song by Jess Glynne, from the album Always In Between
- "Never Let Me Go", 2011 song by The Human League, from the album Credo
- "Never Let Me Go", 2000 song by Bono and The Million Dollar Hotel Band, from The Million Dollar Hotel soundtrack
- "Never Let Me Go", 1956 song written by Ray Evans and Jay Livingston; sung by Nat King Cole in the film The Scarlet Hour; released on Bill Evans's 1970 album Alone
- "Can U Be", 2024 song by ¥$ and Travis Scott, originally known as "Never Let Me Go"

== See also ==
- Never Let Go (disambiguation)
- Never Let You Go (disambiguation)
