= Never Gonna Let You Go =

"Never Gonna Let You Go" may refer to:

- Never Gonna Let You Go (album), an album by Vicki Sue Robinson
- "Never Gonna Let You Go" (Barry Mann and Cynthia Weil song) (also recorded by Sérgio Mendes)
- "Never Gonna Let You Go" (Faith Evans song)
- "Never Gonna Let You Go" (Tina Moore song)
- "Never Gonna Let You Go" (Esthero song)
- "Never Gonna Let You Go", a song on the Teknochek Collision album by Slavic Soul Party!

== See also ==
- Never Let You Go (disambiguation)
