= List of Billboard Adult Contemporary number ones of 2010 =

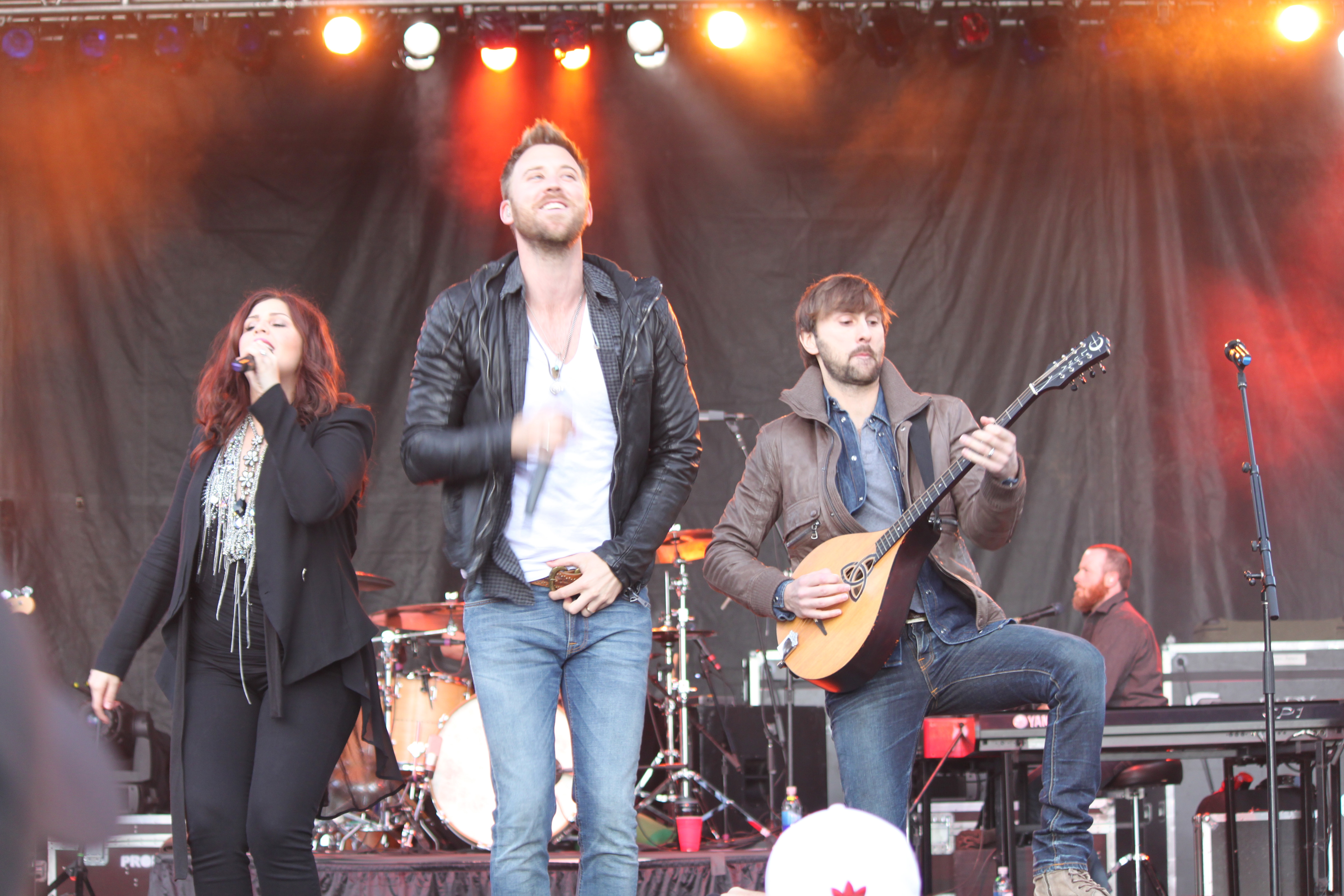
Country music band Lady Antebellum topped the chart with "Need You Now".

Adult Contemporary is a chart published by Billboard ranking the top-performing songs in the United States in the adult contemporary music (AC) market. In 2010, eight different songs topped the chart in 52 issues of the magazine, based on weekly airplay data from radio stations compiled by Nielsen Broadcast Data Systems.

On the first chart of the year, Taylor Swift was at number one with "You Belong with Me", the song's tenth consecutive week in the top spot. The song's unbroken run at the top ended at 13 weeks, although after two weeks out of the top spot it returned for one further week at number one in the issue of Billboard dated February 13. In the early portion of the year three songs had multiple spells at number one, including "Fallin' for You" by Colbie Caillat, which was twice replaced at number one only to rebound to the top of the chart. In the issue of Billboard dated April 3, country music group Lady Antebellum began a run of 13 consecutive weeks at number one with "Need You Now". The song was a chart-topper across multiple genres, and when it spent its tenth week at number one on the AC listing, it broke the record previously held by Rascal Flatts for the longest stay atop that chart by a country act. In topping the AC chart several months after it reached number one on the country listing, the song was seen as part of a trend of country songs quickly gaining success on country radio before going on to impact AC radio at a later date, thereby extending their lifespan across all of Billboard's charts.

The longest unbroken run at number one in 2010 was achieved by the band Train's song "Hey, Soul Sister", the group's first chart-topper since 2004, which spent 17 consecutive weeks in the top spot beginning in July. In total the song spent 19 weeks atop the chart in 2010, the most for a single song during the year. It would eventually spend a total of 22 weeks at number one, the second-highest figure at the time for the AC listing behind only Uncle Kracker's version of "Drift Away", which spent 28 weeks in the top spot in 2003 and 2004. Taylor Swift was the only act with more than one number one during the year, spending five weeks in the top spot with "You Belong with Me" and a single week with "Mine". The former song, which was released in different versions to country and pop/AC radio, has been seen by critics as a key stage in Swift's transition from a country singer to a pop artist. "Mine" was replaced at number one in the issue of Billboard dated December 18 by Mariah Carey's "Oh Santa!", which was the final AC number one of 2010. Carey's track had entered the chart the previous week, meaning that it made the fastest climb to number one since the AC chart began to be compiled using Nielsen data in 1993.

== Chart history ==
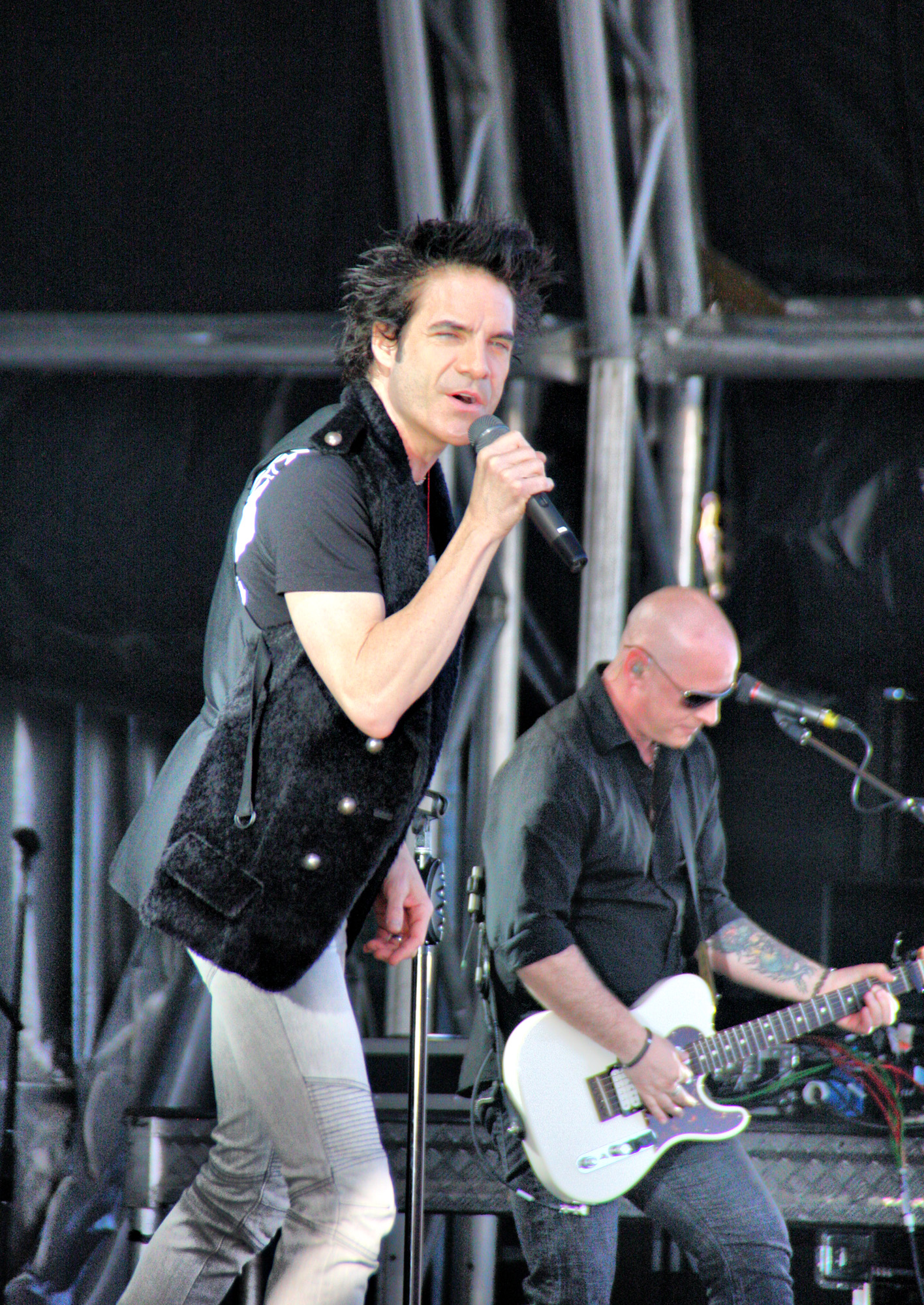
The band Train spent 18 weeks at number one with "Hey, Soul Sister".

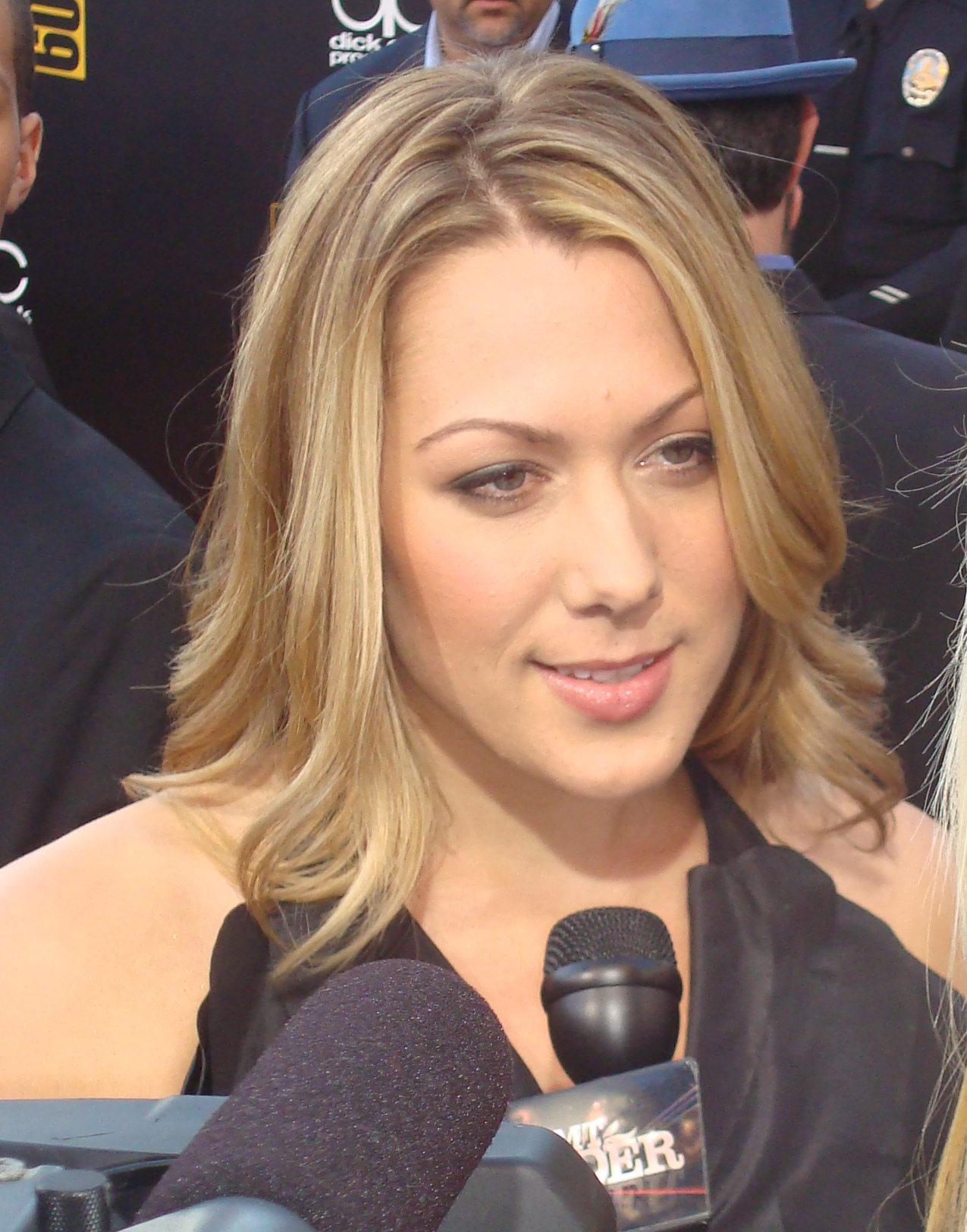
Colbie Caillat’s song "Fallin' for You" spent five weeks at number one

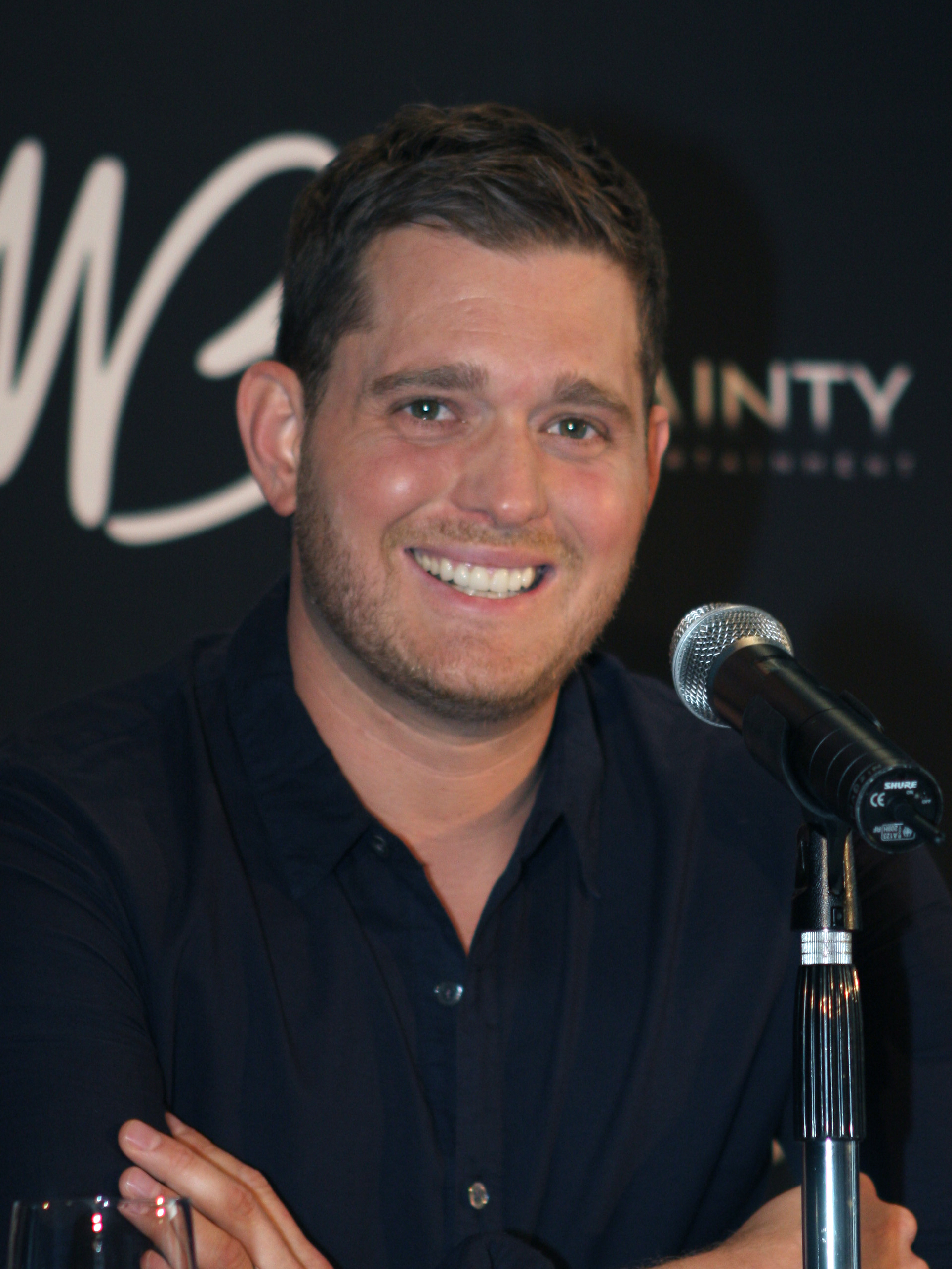
Michael Bublé’s song “Haven't Met You Yet”, spent a total of three weeks at number one.

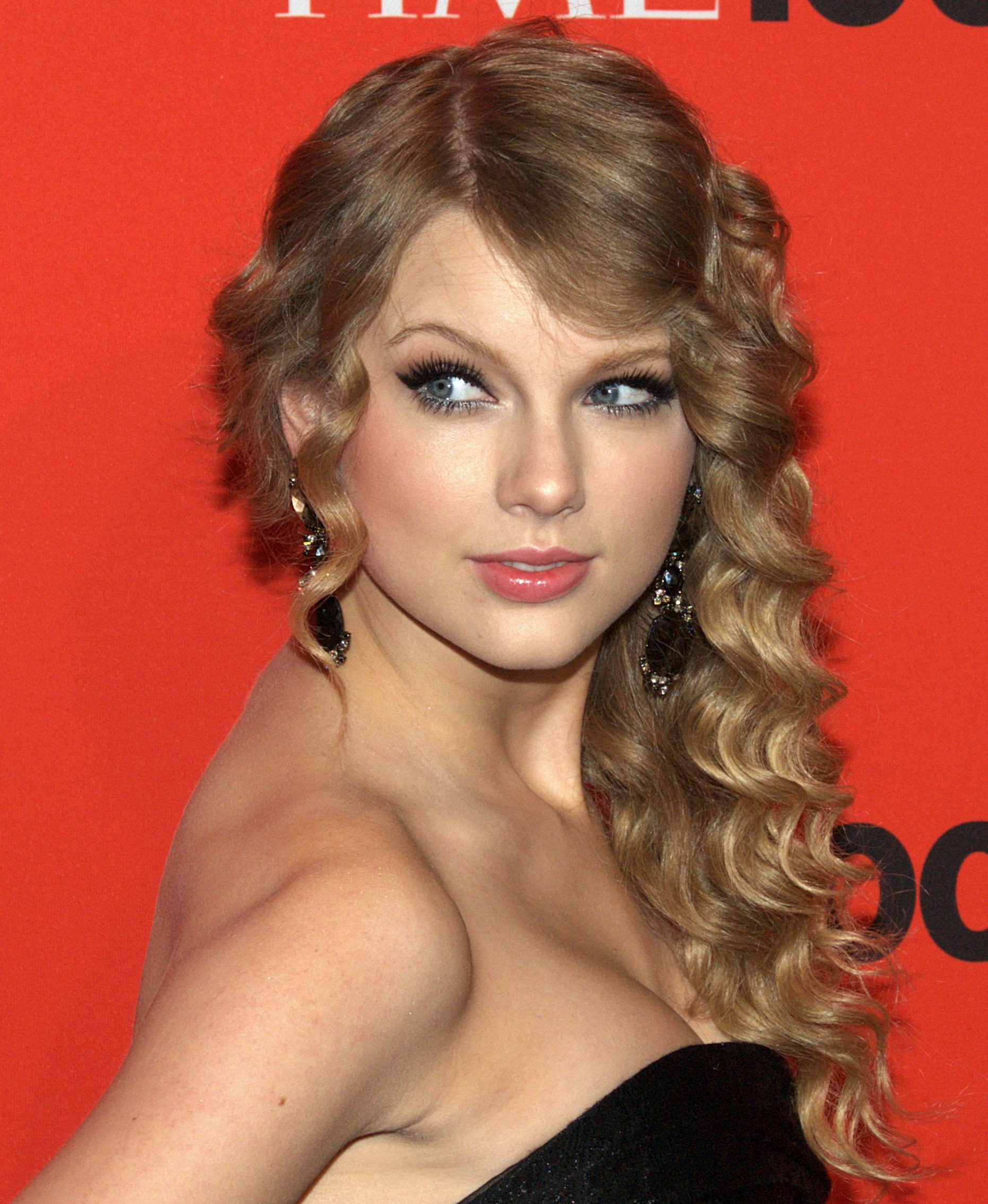
Taylor Swift topped the chart twice in 2010 with "You Belong with Me" and "Mine".

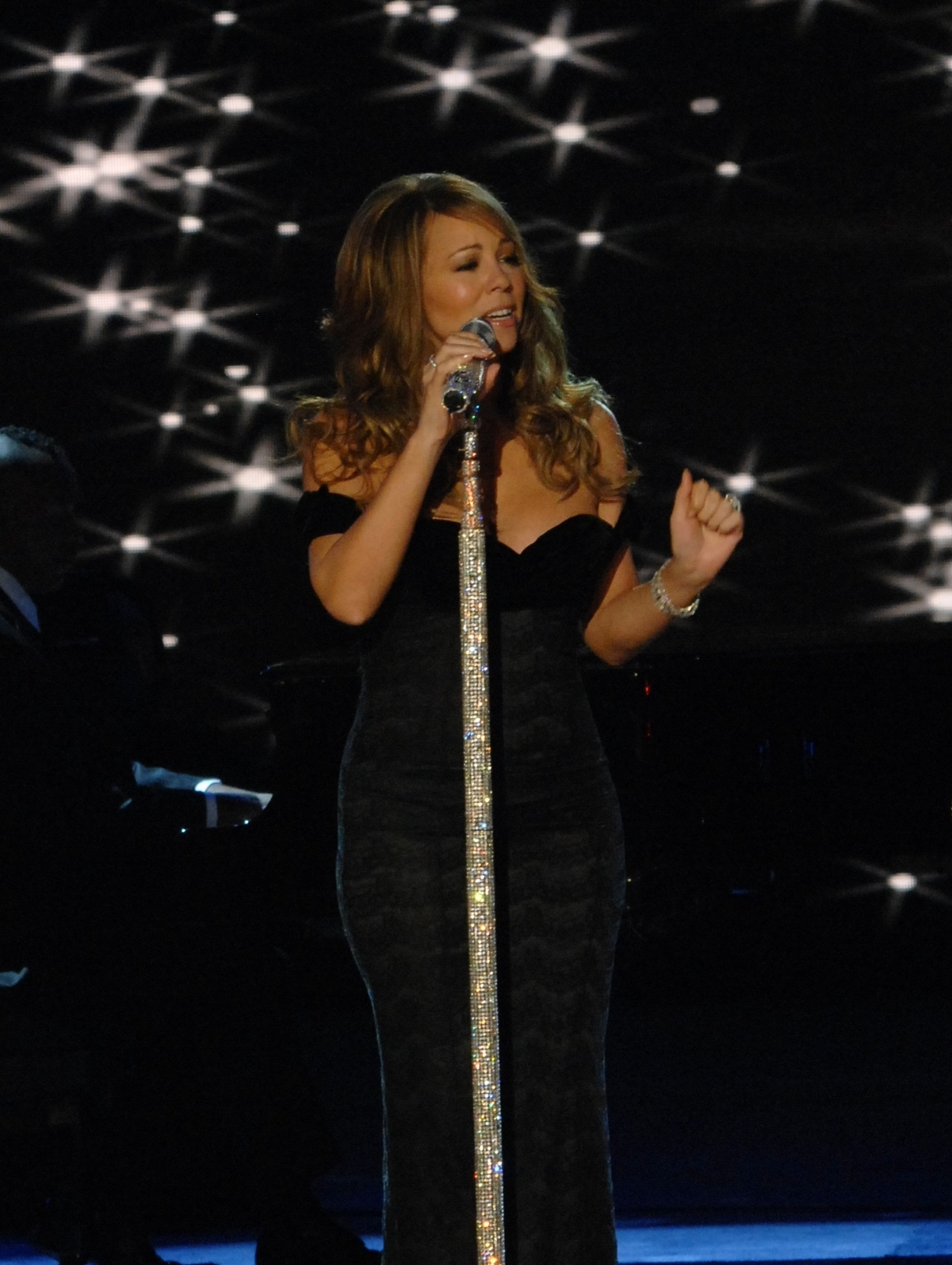
Mariah Carey topped the chart with her Christmas song "Oh Santa!" for the last two weeks of December 2010.

Key
†	Indicates best-performing AC song of 2010

Issue date	Title	Artist(s)	Ref.
January 2	"You Belong with Me"	Taylor Swift	
January 9	"You Belong with Me"	Taylor Swift	
January 16	"You Belong with Me"	Taylor Swift	
January 23	"You Belong with Me"	Taylor Swift	
January 30	"Haven't Met You Yet"	Michael Bublé	
February 6	"Fallin' for You"	Colbie Caillat	
February 13	"You Belong with Me"	Taylor Swift	
February 20	"Fallin' for You"	Colbie Caillat	
February 27	"Fallin' for You"	Colbie Caillat	
March 6	"Fallin' for You"	Colbie Caillat	
March 13	"Haven't Met You Yet"	Michael Bublé	
March 20	"Haven't Met You Yet"	Michael Bublé	
March 27	"Fallin' for You"	Colbie Caillat	
April 3	"Need You Now" †	Lady Antebellum	
April 10	"Need You Now" †	Lady Antebellum	
April 17	"Need You Now" †	Lady Antebellum	
April 24	"Need You Now" †	Lady Antebellum	
May 1	"Need You Now" †	Lady Antebellum	
May 8	"Need You Now" †	Lady Antebellum	
May 15	"Need You Now" †	Lady Antebellum	
May 22	"Need You Now" †	Lady Antebellum	
May 29	"Need You Now" †	Lady Antebellum	
June 5	"Need You Now" †	Lady Antebellum	
June 12	"Need You Now" †	Lady Antebellum	
June 19	"Need You Now" †	Lady Antebellum	
June 26	"Need You Now" †	Lady Antebellum	
July 3	"Hey, Soul Sister"	Train	
July 10	"Need You Now" †	Lady Antebellum	
July 17	"Need You Now" †	Lady Antebellum	
July 24	"Hey, Soul Sister"	Train	
July 31	"Hey, Soul Sister"	Train	
August 7	"Hey, Soul Sister"	Train	
August 14	"Hey, Soul Sister"	Train	
August 21	"Hey, Soul Sister"	Train	
August 28	"Hey, Soul Sister"	Train	
September 4	"Hey, Soul Sister"	Train	
September 11	"Hey, Soul Sister"	Train	
September 18	"Hey, Soul Sister"	Train	
September 25	"Hey, Soul Sister"	Train	
October 2	"Hey, Soul Sister"	Train	
October 9	"Hey, Soul Sister"	Train	
October 16	"Hey, Soul Sister"	Train	
October 23	"Hey, Soul Sister"	Train	
October 30	"Hey, Soul Sister"	Train	
November 6	"Hey, Soul Sister"	Train	
November 13	"Hey, Soul Sister"	Train	
November 20	"Breakeven"	The Script	
November 27	"Hey, Soul Sister"	Train	
December 4	"Breakeven"	The Script	
December 11	"Mine"	Taylor Swift	
December 18	"Oh Santa!"	Mariah Carey	
December 25	"Oh Santa!"	Mariah Carey	

== See also ==
- 2010 in music
- List of artists who reached number one on the U.S. Adult Contemporary chart
