= Concept of One (album) =

Studio album by Concept of One
- Released: 16 July 1993
- Genres: Freestyle; dance-pop
- Producer: Tony Moran

Concept of One is the debut album of the dance-pop and freestyle music group Concept of One, created by music producer Tony Moran. The album was released on 16 July 1993 by the label Cutting Records. It included the first hit single released by Tony Moran, "Dance with Me", and the song "The Question", which featured the participation of singer Noel Pagan.

== Track listing ==
| No. | Title | Length |
|---|---|---|
| 1. | "So in Love" (Brenda K. Starr) | 3:59 |
| 2. | "Got the Love" (Christian DeCotto) | 4:46 |
| 3. | "Saving All My Love" (The Latin Rascals) | 5:10 |
| 4. | "We've Only Just Begun" (The Latin Rascals) | 6:15 |
| 5. | "Spend My Life with You" (System 3) | 4:51 |
| 6. | "The Way She Moves" (The Latin Rascals) | 5:50 |
| 7. | "Would You Like to Get Together" (Tony Moran) | 5:20 |
| 8. | "The Question" (Noel Pagan) | 4:47 |
| 9. | "Dance with Me" (Tony Moran) | 4:44 |
| 10. | "So in Love" (Brenda K. Starr) | 5:37 |

== Chart performance ==
Singles – Billboard

| Year | Single | Record chart | Position |
|---|---|---|---|
| 1990 | "Dance with Me" | Hot Dance Music/Maxi-Singles Sales | 32 |
| 1990 | "The Question" | Hot Dance Music/Maxi-Singles Sales | 24 |
