= Silent Morning =

Single by Noel

from the album Noel
- Released: 1987
- Genre: Latin hip-hop
- Length: 4:26 (LP version)
- Label: 4th & B'way
- Songwriter: Noel Pagan
- Producers: Roman Ricardo; Paul Robb

Noel singles chronology
"Silent Morning" (1987)	"Like a Child" (1988)

"Silent Morning" is the debut single by American singer Noel Pagan, released from his 1987 debut album Noel. It is Noel's most successful single; on November 14, 1987, it reached number 47 on the US Billboard Hot 100 chart. "Silent Morning" was present on the Hot 100 for 22 weeks.

== Background and composition ==
The song came about after Noel was discovered by a man looking for singers, who invited him to a studio to record a song. While there, and with Noel having never written a song, the man gave advice for Noel to write about what he was feeling. The song that Noel recorded was originally called "Spanish Morning". After a few weeks of recording, the man disappeared. At that time, Noel worked as assistant bartender at a club, only to discover that his boss had good contacts, and knew artists like David Bowie and Mick Jagger. Noel decided to record a demo and handed it to his boss. Some weeks later Noel's boss said he had shown the song to the manager of a label, and that he liked the song but not the lyrics, and asked Noel to change them. Noel rewrote the song, and called it "Silent Morning".

Spin listed the recording of "Silent Morning" as the seventh of ten "Great Moments in Recording Studio History", due to an alleged event in which "producer Aaron Hanson (of Hanson & Davis) put a gun to Noel's head and threatened to blow his head off if he didn't sing the song Hanson's way".

== Track listing and formats ==
US 12" single

No.	Title	Length
1.	"Silent Morning" (12" Club Mix)	7:00
2.	"Silent Morning" (Percapella)	3:13
3.	"Silent Morning" (1018 Dub)	6:41
4.	"Silent Morning" (Hearthrob)	5:07

== Charts ==
=== Weekly charts ===
Chart (1987)	Peak position
US Billboard Hot 100	47
US Dance Club Songs (Billboard)	6
US Dance/Electronic Singles Sales (Billboard)	7
