= Kiss of Life (album) =

Studio album by Siedah Garrett
- Released: June 15, 1988
- Recorded: 1987–1988
- Studio: Westlake Studios, Image Recording Studios, The Village Recorder and Studio Masters (Los Angeles, California); Conway Studios (Hollywood, California)
- Genre: Funk; soul
- Length: 44:28
- Label: Qwest Records
- Producer: Rod Temperton; Dick Rudolph

Siedah Garrett chronology
| Kiss of Life (1988) | Siedah (2003) |

Singles from Kiss of Life
- 1. "K.I.S.S.I.N.G."

Professional ratings
Review scores
| Source | Rating |
|---|---|
| AllMusic | 3/5 stars |

Kiss of Life is the debut solo album by American singer-songwriter Siedah Garrett, released in 1988 by Quincy Jones's Qwest Records.

== Track listing ==
Side one

1. "K.I.S.S.I.N.G." (Dana Merino, Guy Babylon) – 5:24
2. "Refuse to Be Loose" (L.A. Reid, Babyface) – 4:19
3. "Innocent Side" (Clif Magness, Siedah Garrett) – 5:06
4. "Night of No Return" (Dwania Kyles, Mervine Grady) – 4:50

Side two

1. "Kiss of Life" (Barry Blue, Chris Birkett) – 3:49
2. "Groove of Midnight" (Rod Temperton) – 4:40
3. "The Legend of Ruby Diamond" (Glen Ballard, Siedah Garrett) – 5:32
4. "Baby's Got It Bad" (Rod Temperton, Siedah Garrett) – 4:42
5. "Nobody Does Me" (Rod Temperton) – 6:06
- On the vinyl version, tracks 1–4 are marked as "This Side", while tracks 5–9 are marked as "That Side".
- "Groove of Midnight" had been recorded as a demo by Michael Jackson during the 1986–87 Bad album sessions.
- "Baby's Got It Bad" is a reworked version of "Got the Hots", a demo recorded by Michael Jackson during the 1982 Thriller album sessions (included as a bonus track on the Japanese release of Thriller 25).

== Personnel ==
=== Musicians ===
- Siedah Garrett – vocals, backing vocals (1, 2, 4–9)
- Larry Williams – synthesizers, synthesizer programming, saxophones (5, 7, 9)
- Guy Babylon – synthesizers (1), synthesizer programming (1), arrangements (1)
- Babyface – synthesizers (2), synthesizer programming (2)
- Clif Magness – synthesizers (3), synthesizer programming (3), arrangements (3)
- Randy Waldman – synthesizers (5), synthesizer programming (5)
- Glen Ballard – synthesizers (7), synthesizer programming (7), arrangements (7)
- Randy Kerber – synthesizers (7), synthesizer programming (7)
- George Duke – keyboards (9)
- Paul Jackson Jr. – guitars (1, 6, 8, 9)
- Basil Fung – guitars (5, 7, 8)
- Bruce Gaitsch – guitars (5, 8)
- David Williams – guitars (6, 8)
- Neil Stubenhaus – bass (9)
- John Robinson – drums (6, 7, 9)
- Dan Higgins – saxophones (5, 7, 9)
- Gary Grant – trumpet (1, 5, 7, 9), flugelhorn (1, 5, 7, 9)
- Jerry Hey – trumpet (1, 5, 7, 9), flugelhorn (1, 5, 7, 9), arrangements (1, 3, 5–7, 9)
- Rod Temperton – arrangements, backing vocals (4), "dirty old man" voice intro (5)
- Amber Merino – "little girl" voice (1)
- Phillip Ingram – backing vocals (3, 5)
- Phil Terry – backing vocals (3)
- Bert Kelley – backing vocals (4)
- Nadirah Shakoor– backing vocals (4, 5)
- Mark Vieha – backing vocals (4)
- Kevin Dorsey – backing vocals (5, 7)
- Jim Gilstrap – backing vocals (5)
- Phil Perry – backing vocals (5)
- Maxine Waters – backing vocals (5)
- David Banks – "old man" rap (7)

=== Production ===
Adapted from Discogs.

- Quincy Jones – executive producer
- Benny Medina – A&R direction
- Michael Ostin – A&R direction
- Dick Rudolph – producer
- Rod Temperton – producer
- Craig Johnson – recording, mixing (3)
- John Van Nest – recording
- Mick Guzauski – mixing (1, 2, 4–9)
- Matt Forger – additional engineer
- Tom Biener – second engineer
- Ric Butz – second engineer
- Ron DaSilva – second engineer
- Mark Hagen – second engineer
- Tim Jacquette – second engineer
- Debbie Johnson – second engineer
- Greg Loskorn – second engineer
- Jim McMahon – second engineer, technical direction
- Matt Pakucko – second engineer
- Richard Piatt – second engineer
- Brad Sundberg – second engineer
- Alex Welti – second engineer
- Bernie Grundman – mastering at Bernie Grundman Mastering (Hollywood, California)
- Karen Jones – A&R coordinator
- Marsha Loeb – production coordinator
- Beverly Lund – production coordinator
- JoAnn Tominaga – production coordinator
- Lynn Robb – art direction
- Tracee Augcomfar – design (Siedah's logo)
- Victoria Pearson – photography
- David Massey – management

== Charts ==
| Chart (1988) | Peak position |
|---|---|
| US Top Black Albums (Billboard) | 41 |
