= I Never Told You =

2010 single by Colbie Caillat

Single by Colbie Caillat

from the album Breakthrough
- Released: February 16, 2010
- Recorded: Summer 2007
- Studio: Revolver Studios (Westlake Village, CA)
- Genre: Pop rock
- Length: 3:53 (album version); 3:48 (single mix)
- Label: Universal Republic
- Songwriters: Colbie Caillat; Kara DioGuardi; Jason Reeves
- Producer: Kara DioGuardi

Colbie Caillat singles chronology
"Fallin' for You" (2009)	"I Never Told You" (2010)	"I Do" (2011)

Music video
- "I Never Told You" on YouTube

"I Never Told You" is a song by the American pop singer-songwriter Colbie Caillat from her second album Breakthrough (2009). The song was released on February 16, 2010 in the United States as the second single. The song is a power ballad in E-flat major and was written by Caillat, Jason Reeves and Kara DioGuardi and produced by DioGuardi. The song talks about the love the singer still has for her lover they felt strongly about at one point in their life. The song received positive reviews from music critics. In the charts, the song has performed moderately well, it has peaked at #48 on the Billboard Hot 100 and #3 on the Adult Pop Songs.

== Background ==
In 'I Never Told You,' Colbie Caillat reveals she still has feelings for a previous love and misses him. Caillat originally penned this song while touring Europe in her hotel bathroom. She told Starpulse.com: "I wrote it about someone I had broken up with that I was missing at the time." Later, the song was completed during a three-week "writing camp" in Hawaii that Caillat organized with fellow singer/songwriter Jason Reeves and American Idol judge Kara DioGuardi.

== Critical reception ==
In the review of the album, Sal Cinquemani from Slant Magazine said that "Kara DioGuardi deserves some credit for helping Caillat deliver one of her most emotive performances to date on the melancholy "I Never Told You"; on any other record, the song would be easily tagged as mediocre filler, but here it's an album highlight".

== Promotion ==
Colbie began promoting the song on the Jimmy Kimmel Live! show on January 8, 2010. Later, she appeared on The Tonight Show with Jay Leno on March 11, 2010.

== Music video ==
The official music video was directed by Roman White, and released on Vevo.com on April 2, 2010.

It involves scenes of Colbie singing while painting, couples breaking apart but eventually were brought back again including herself and her love interest. The music video uses a different mix of the song (the "Single Mix") which is shorter than the Album Version and repeats the line "Oh no, I never told you" towards the end of the song. This version of the song was released by Promo Only in July 2010. The music video has also landed in the number #1 spot on the VH1 Top 20 Video Countdown. She has gone to #1 twice on different occurrences during the show.

== Chart performance ==
The song debuted at number 99 on the Billboard Hot 100 chart on the week ending of April 10, 2010 and peaked at number 48.

The song reached number three on Adult Pop Songs and number eleven on Adult Contemporary. It charted on Billboard Radio Songs and peaked at number 54, while peaking at number 43 on Hot Digital Songs chart.

"I Never Told You" was ranked at number 15 on the year-end tally for Adult Pop Songs. The song was certified Gold by the Recording Industry Association of America (RIAA).

== Charts ==
=== Weekly charts ===
Chart (2009–10)	Peak position
Canada AC (Billboard)	42
Canada Hot AC (Billboard)	36
US Billboard Hot 100	48
US Adult Contemporary (Billboard)	11
US Adult Pop Airplay (Billboard)	3

=== Year-end charts ===
Chart (2010)	Position
US Adult Contemporary (Billboard)	18
US Adult Top 40 (Billboard)	15

== Certifications ==
Region	Certification	Certified units/sales
Brazil (Pro-Música Brasil)	Gold	30,000^{‡}
United States (RIAA)	2× Platinum	2,000,000^{‡}
^{‡} Sales+streaming figures based on certification alone.

== Release history ==
Country	Date	Label	Format
United States	November 6, 2009	Universal Republic	Digital download (Imeem)
United States	February 16, 2010	Universal Republic	Radio Adds
United States	June 29, 2010	Universal Republic	Top 40 Mainstream Radio (radio version)
