= Noel (Noel Pagan album) =

Studio album by Noel
- Released: 1988 (LP album, cassette and CD)
- Genre: Latin freestyle; freestyle; synth-pop
- Length: 44:11
- Label: 4th & B'way; Island; PolyGram 444 009
- Producer: Paul Robb; John "Jellybean" Benitez; Roman Ricardo; Charles Roth; Ish Ledesma; "Little" Louie Vega

Noel chronology
| Noel (1988) | Hearts on Fire (1993) |

Singles from Noel
- 1. "Silent Morning" Released: 1987; 2. "Like a Child" Released: 1988; 3. "Out of Time" Released: 1988; 4. "Change" Released: 1989

Professional ratings
Review scores
| Source | Rating |
|---|---|
| AllMusic | link |

Noel is the debut album by Latin freestyle artist Noel, released in 1988 on both LP and CD formats. The album contains four singles, and reached No. 126 on the Billboard 200.

The first single, "Silent Morning", is his most successful single to date. It reached No. 47 on the Billboard Hot 100 in 1987. The second single, "Like a Child", also became very popular and was his first single to reach the top position on the Hot Dance Music/Club Play chart. The third single from the album, "Out of Time" did not enter the Billboard Hot 100 but was the second single to reach the top of the Hot Dance Music/Club Play chart and the last to participate. The fourth single, "Change", also had similar success as the previous singles.

== Track listing ==
| No. | Title | Length |
|---|---|---|
| 1. | "Silent Morning" | 4:26 |
| 2. | "Fire to Ice" | 5:27 |
| 3. | "To Be with You" | 3:55 |
| 4. | "Out of Time" | 5:03 |
| 5. | "Change" | 4:12 |
| 6. | "Like a Child" | 5:19 |
| 7. | "Fallen Angel" | 6:17 |
| 8. | "City Streets" | 3:57 |
| 9. | "What I Feel for You" | 5:37 |

Japanese edition

| No. | Title | Length |
|---|---|---|
| 10. | "Out of Time" (club mix) | 7:18 |

== Charts ==
Album – Billboard (United States)

| Year | Chart | Position |
|---|---|---|
| 1988 | Billboard 200 | 126 |

Singles – Billboard (United States)

| Year | Single | Chart | Position |
|---|---|---|---|
| 1987 | "Silent Morning" | Hot Dance Music/Club Play | 6 |
| 1987 | "Silent Morning" | Hot Dance Music/Maxi-Singles Sales | 7 |
| 1987 | "Silent Morning" | Billboard Hot 100 | 47 |
| 1988 | "Like a Child" | Hot Dance Music/Club Play | 1 |
| 1988 | "Like a Child" | Hot Dance Music/Maxi-Singles Sales | 6 |
| 1988 | "Like a Child" | Hot R&B/Hip-Hop Singles & Tracks | 88 |
| 1988 | "Like a Child" | Billboard Hot 100 | 67 |
| 1988 | "Out of Time" | Hot Dance Music/Club Play | 1 |
| 1988 | "Out of Time" | Hot Dance Music/Maxi-Singles Sales | 9 |
