= Concept of One =

Music project formed by Tony Moran

Concept of One was a dance-pop and freestyle music project formed in 1989 by music producer Tony Moran, soon after the end of the Latin Rascals. The first single released by Concept of One was "Dance with Me", which features Moran on vocals. Another success was the single "The Question", which contains the participation of singer Noel Pagan.

In 1993, the project released their self-titled debut album, containing the singles "Dance with Me", "The Question" and "So in Love", which includes the participation of singer Brenda K. Starr. This album also marked the return of the Latin Rascals group that featured on three tracks. Other artists featured on the album are Christian DeCotto and System 3.

== Discography ==
Year	Album details
1993	Concept of One: Released: 16 July 1993; Label: Cutting Records

=== Singles ===
Year	Single	Positions	Album
Year	Single	US Maxi-Singles Sales	Album
1989	"Dance with Me"	32	Concept of One
1990	"The Question"	24	Concept of One
1993	"So in Love"	—	Concept of One
