= Fallin' for You (Colbie Caillat song) =

2009 single by Colbie Caillat

Single by Colbie Caillat

from the album Breakthrough
- Released: June 26, 2009
- Studio: Henson Recording Studios (Los Angeles, CA); Revolver Studios (Westlake Village, CA)
- Length: 3:37
- Label: Universal Republic
- Songwriters: Colbie Caillat; Rick Nowels
- Producers: Rick Nowels; John Shanks; Ken Caillat

Colbie Caillat singles chronology
"Lucky" (2008)	"Fallin' for You" (2009)	"I Never Told You" (2010)

Music video
- "Fallin' for You" on YouTube

"Fallin' for You" is a song by American singer-songwriter Colbie Caillat. It was written by Caillat along with Rick Nowels and produced by Nowels, John Shanks, and Caillat's father, Ken Caillat, for her second studio album, Breakthrough (2009). The song was released on June 26, 2009 as the lead single from the album, through Universal Republic.

Commercially, the song reached the top ten in Japan as well as number 12 in the United States and Flanders. The song was included on the international soundtrack of the Brazilian soap opera Viver a Vida (Portuguese for Seize the Day). "Fallin' for You" is Caillat's fourth single to be included in a soap opera in Brazil. The first was "Bubbly" in Sete Pecados, the second was "Midnight Bottle" in Três Irmãs and the third was "Lucky" in Caras & Bocas.

The song was also featured on the 2010 Grammy Nominees album, representing the nomination that Caillat received for Best Pop Vocal Album at the 52nd Annual Grammy Awards.

== Chart performance ==
The song debuted at No. 12 to become Caillat's highest debut on the US Billboard Hot 100, the hot shot debut of the week and her most successful song on the US charts since her debut single "Bubbly". The song returned to the top 20 for two weeks, when her album debuted at No. 1, reaching No. 15. With 118,000 first-week downloads, it's also her first top 10 on the Hot Digital Songs chart since debut single "Bubbly" peaked at No. 4 in November 2007. On Billboard's Hot Adult Contemporary Tracks, the song spent 14 weeks at No. 2, before rising to No. 1 the week of February 6, 2010. On the Canadian Hot 100, the song was the hot shot of the week, debuting at No. 55.

== Music video ==
The video was released in July 2009 and was directed by The Malloys. It was filmed in Malibu, California. In the video, Caillat goes to the beach with a man, played by Bobby Moynihan, who is not her type (as she says during a phone call in the beginning of the video), but she starts to like him more and more over the course of the outing. At the end of the video when she sings the lyrics "Oh, I'm fallin' for you." the man pops out of the trailer asking, "Seriously? You mean it?" and Caillat nods, indicating that she has fallen for him.

== Track listings ==
European CD single

1. "Fallin' For You" – 3:40
2. "Hoy Me Voy" (featuring Juanes) – 3:22

European maxi-CD single

1. "Fallin' For You" – 3:40
2. "Hoy Me Voy" (featuring Juanes) – 3:22
3. "Something Special" – 3:06
4. "Turn Your Lights Down Low" (live) – 5:56

== Charts ==
=== Weekly charts ===
Chart (2009–2010)	Peak position
Australia (ARIA)	63
Austria (Ö3 Austria Top 40)	13
Belgium (Ultratop 50 Flanders)	12
Belgium (Ultratop 50 Wallonia)	24
Canada Hot 100 (Billboard)	28
Canada AC (Billboard)	1
Canada CHR/Top 40 (Billboard)	46
Canada Hot AC (Billboard)	7
Germany (GfK)	16
Japan Hot 100 (Billboard)	9
Netherlands (Single Top 100)	68
New Zealand (Recorded Music NZ)	31
Switzerland (Schweizer Hitparade)	21
UK Singles (OCC)	198
US Billboard Hot 100	12
US Adult Alternative Airplay (Billboard)	5
US Adult Contemporary (Billboard)	1
US Adult Pop Airplay (Billboard)	2
US Pop Airplay (Billboard)	17

=== Year-end charts ===
Chart (2009)	Position
Canada (Canadian Hot 100)	99
Japan Adult Contemporary (Billboard)	39
US Billboard Hot 100	68
US Adult Contemporary (Billboard)	20
US Adult Top 40 (Billboard)	14

Chart (2010)	Position
US Adult Contemporary (Billboard)	6
US Adult Top 40 (Billboard)	44

== Certifications ==
Region	Certification	Certified units/sales
Brazil (Pro-Música Brasil)	Gold	30,000^{‡}
New Zealand (RMNZ)	Gold	15,000^{‡}
United States (RIAA)	2× Platinum	2,000,000^{‡}
^{‡} Sales+streaming figures based on certification alone.

== Release history ==
Region	Date	Format	Label	Ref.
United States	June 26, 2009	—N/a	Universal Republic	
Europe	July 24, 2009	CD	Universal Republic	
United States	August 11, 2009	Contemporary hit radio	Universal Republic	

== See also ==
- List of number-one adult contemporary singles of 2010 (U.S.)
