= Everchanging Times =

Song

Single by Siedah Garrett
- Released: 1987
- Length: 4:28
- Label: Qwest
- Songwriters: Burt Bacharach; Bill Conti; Carole Bayer Sager
- Producers: Bacharach; Bayer Sager; David Foster

Siedah Garrett singles chronology
"I Just Can't Stop Loving You" (1987)	"Everchanging Times" (1987)	"K.I.S.S.I.N.G." (1988)

"Everchanging Times" is a song by American singer Siedah Garrett. It was written by Burt Bacharach, Bill Conti, and Carole Bayer Sager with Bacharach and Bayer producing the song along with David Foster for the 1987 romantic comedy film Baby Boom, directed by Charles Shyer.

== Charts ==
Chart performance for "Everchanging Times"
Chart (1987)	Peak position
US Adult Contemporary (Billboard)	30
US Hot R&B/Hip-Hop Songs (Billboard)	44

== Aretha Franklin version ==
"Ever Changing Times"

Single by Aretha Franklin featuring Michael McDonald

from the album What You See Is What You Sweat
- Released: January 1992
- Studio: Conway Recording Studios (Los Angeles, CA); Westlake Recording Studios (Los Angeles, CA); Lighthouse Studios (Los Angeles, CA); Chartmaker Studios (Los Angeles, CA); Phase II Studios (Los Angeles, CA); Willyworld Studios (Los Angeles, CA); United Sound Systems (Detroit, MI)
- Length: 4:29
- Label: Arista
- Songwriters: Burt Bacharach; Bill Conti; Carole Bayer Sager
- Producers: Bacharach; Bayer Sager

Music video
- "Everchanging Times" on YouTube

In 1991, the song was released as "Ever Changing Times" on Aretha Franklin's thirty-sixth studio album What You See Is What You Sweat. It was issued on cassette single the following January. Michael McDonald contributed the shadow vocals. The song served as the fourth single from the album, reaching the Top 20 of Billboard's Adult Contemporary and R&B surveys. This version was recorded at Detroit's United Sound Studios and written/produced by Burt Bacharach.

=== Charts ===
Chart performance for "Everchanging Times"
Chart (1992)	Peak position
US Adult Contemporary (Billboard)	11
US Hot R&B/Hip-Hop Songs (Billboard)	19
