= The Question (song) =

Single by Concept of One with Noel Pagan

from the album Concept of One
- Released: 1990
- Genre: Freestyle

Concept of One singles chronology
"Dance with Me" (1989)	"The Question" (1990)	"So in Love" (1993)

Noel Pagan singles chronology
"Change" (1989)	"The Question" (1990)	"Hearts on Fire" (1993)

"The Question" is the second single by Concept of One from the album Concept of One, released in 1990 with the participation of freestyle singer Noel Pagan. Although the song only achieved moderate success on the charts entering only the dance singles chart, it became one of Noel's most popular, where he still includes it in his live shows.

== Track listings ==
US 12" single

No.	Title	Length
1.	"The Question" (extended Question mix)	7:07
2.	"The Question" (a cappella)	4:39
3.	"The Question" (radio mix)	4:45
4.	"The Question" (Answer dub)	9:14
5.	"The Question" (Rascal Beats)	3:42

US CD maxi-single

No.	Title	Length
1.	"The Question" (radio version)	4:47
2.	"The Question" (extended Question mix)	7:06
3.	"The Question" (house version)	5:31
4.	"The Question" (Answer dub)	9:14

== Charts ==
Chart (1990)	Peak position
US Hot Dance Music/Maxi-Singles Sales (Billboard)	24
