= K.I.S.S.I.N.G. =

Single by Siedah Garrett

from the album Kiss of Life
- B-side: "Taboo"
- Released: 1988
- Recorded: 1987–1988
- Studio: Westlake Recording Studios
- Genre: R&B
- Length: 5:24 (album version); 4:05 (single version)
- Label: Qwest
- Songwriters: Dana Merino; Guy Babylon
- Producers: Rod Temperton; Dick Rudolph

Siedah Garrett singles chronology
| "Everchanging Times" (1987) | "K.I.S.S.I.N.G." (1988) | "Refuse to Be Loose" (1988) |

"K.I.S.S.I.N.G." is a 1988 single by American singer/songwriter Siedah Garrett, taken from her debut album, Kiss of Life (1988). The single was her most successful release as a solo artist, hitting number one on the US dance chart for one week. On the soul chart, "K.I.S.S.I.N.G." peaked at number sixteen and on the Billboard Hot 100, it went to number ninety-seven.

== Track listing ==
- 7-inch / cassette single
1. "K.I.S.S.I.N.G." – 4:05
2. "Taboo" – 3:28
- 12-inch single
1. "K.I.S.S.I.N.G." (Heat of Passion mix) – 8:14
2. "K.I.S.S.I.N.G." (dub) – 8:30
3. "K.I.S.S.I.N.G." (Acid Bass Line edit) – 7:30
4. "K.I.S.S.I.N.G." (a cappella) – 4:20
- CD single
1. "K.I.S.S.I.N.G." (The Heat of Passion mix) – 8:16
2. "K.I.S.S.I.N.G." (dub) – 8:36
3. "Taboo" – 3:27

== Personnel ==
Credits are adapted from the parent album's liner notes.

- Siedah Garrett – lead and background vocals
- Guy Babylon – arrangement, synths programming and performance
- Jerry Hey – arrangement, trumpet and flugelhorn
- Rod Temperton – arrangement
- Larry "Larr-Dog" Williams – synths programming and performance, and saxophone
- Paul "P.J." Jackson, Jr. – guitar
- Daniel Higgins – saxophone
- Gary Grant – trumpet and flugelhorn
- Amber Merino – little girl

== Charts ==
1988 chart performance for "K.I.S.S.I.N.G."
| Chart (1988) | Peak position |
|---|---|
| UK Singles (OCC) | 77 |
| US Billboard Hot 100 | 97 |
| US Dance Club Songs (Billboard) | 1 |
| US Hot R&B/Hip-Hop Songs (Billboard) | 16 |

1992 chart performance for "K.I.S.S.I.N.G. '92"
| Chart (1992) | Peak position |
|---|---|
| UK Club Chart (Music Week) | 98 |
