= Siedah Garrett =

American singer and songwriter (born 1960)

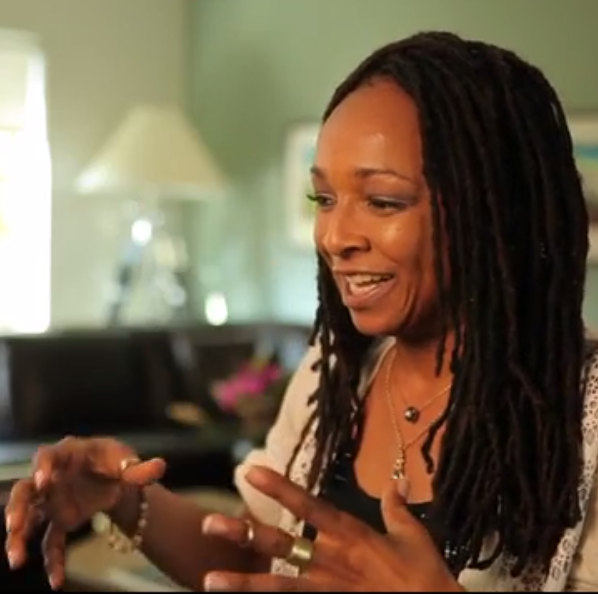
- Garrett in October 2011

Background information
- Born: Deborah Christine Garrett; June 24, 1960 (age 66); Los Angeles, California, U.S.
- Origin: Compton, California, U.S.
- Genres: R&B
- Occupations: Singer; songwriter; composer; actress
- Instruments: Vocals; piano; keyboards
- Years active: 1977–present
- Labels: Qwest; FFRR
- Website: siedah.com

Siedah Garrett (born Deborah Christine Garrett; June 24, 1960) is an American singer, songwriter composer and actress who has written songs and performed backing vocals for many recording artists in the music industry, such as Michael Jackson, Wang Chung, the Pointer Sisters, Brand New Heavies, Quincy Jones, Tevin Campbell, Donna Summer, Madonna, Jennifer Hudson among others. Garrett has been nominated for two Academy Awards for Best Original Song, and won the Grammy Award for Best Song Written for Visual Media at the 50th Annual Grammy Awards for co-writing "Love You I Do" (performed by Jennifer Hudson) for the 2006 musical film Dreamgirls. She co-wrote Jackson's hit song "Man in the Mirror", which was nominated for the Grammy Award for Record of the Year.

== Biography ==
Garrett was born on June 24, 1960, in Los Angeles, California, and raised in Compton, where she started singing as a child. Born Deborah Christine Garrett, she opted to change her name at age 13, because of the disdain she had towards her birth name. Garrett said, "It's a pretty name but nobody called me Deborah. It was always abbreviated to Deb, Debbie, or DeeDee. I hated it". She later changed it to Siedah, which meant "shining and star-like".

Garrett attended Dorsey High School.

As a teenager, Garrett was part of a five-piece band called Black Velvet & Satin Soul, which performed Top 40 hits around various clubs. Garrett's mother was an interior designer who had singer D.J. Rogers as one of her clients. Rogers heard Garrett's singing abilities and recruited her as a background vocalist on his 1977 album, Love, Music and Life.

== Career ==
=== 1980s ===
Siedah Garrett appeared as a contestant on Password Plus in 1980. Later, she joined the soul/funk outfit Plush, who released their self-titled album in 1982 on RCA Records. She soon began stepping out on her own as a solo artist. Her hits include "Don't Look Any Further" with Dennis Edwards (No. 72 pop, No. 2 R&B in 1984); "Do You Want It Right Now?" in 1985 from the Fast Forward soundtrack (No. 3 Hot Dance Music/Club Play and No. 63 R&B), which was covered by Taylor Dayne in 1988 and later covered by Armand Van Helden in 2007 under the title "I Want Your Soul"; "Everchanging Times" from the movie Baby Boom (No. 30 on the Adult Contemporary chart in 1987), and "K.I.S.S.I.N.G." (No. 97 in 1988). The latter song went to No. 1 on the Hot Dance Music/Club Play chart. In the mid-1980s, she also toured and recorded with Sergio Mendes, appearing on three of his albums.

In 1987, Garrett was involved in Michael Jackson's Bad album, singing a duet with Jackson on the number one single "I Just Can't Stop Loving You" and co-writing and singing backing vocals on another number one, "Man in the Mirror". In a 2013 interview with Luka Neskovic, Garrett said: "All I wanted to do was give Michael something he would want to say to the world, and I knew it couldn't be another 'Oh baby, I love you' song. It had to be a little bit more than that. It needed to have some substance. He hadn't recorded anything like this to that point. I was just taking the risk that he might not get it, you know. First of all, I need to send it through Quincy because if Quincy didn't like it there is no way that Michael would've ever heard it. It was a huge privilege for me when Quincy decided that the song was good enough to play for Michael."

Garrett and Jackson recorded a Spanish version of "I Just Can't Stop Loving You", titled "Todo Mi Amor Eres Tu" (translated to "All My Love Is You"), as well as a French version titled "Je Ne Veux Pas La Fin De Nous", during the same recording sessions for the "Bad" album. A gifted musical sight reader with perfect vocal pitch (as most session vocalists are), the initial duet for "I Just Can't Stop Loving You" came as a total surprise to Garrett who simply answered the call expecting to only appear as a background vocalist. She initially felt intimidated with excitement when she entered the recording booth and noticed two music stands with sheet music that had lyric parts labeled "Michael" and "Siedah".

Garrett's association with Jackson enabled her to sing on several Quincy Jones albums of the 1980s and 1990s. Affectionately dubbed "Sid" by Quincy Jones, she co-wrote the hit songs "Tomorrow (A Better You, Better Me)" (originally an instrumental tune by The Brothers Johnson to which she added lyrics), "Back On The Block", and "The Secret Garden (Sweet Seduction Suite)", in addition to performing lead vocals for "I Don't Go for That", "One Man Woman" and "The Places You Find Love", all on Jones' Grammy Award-winning 1989 Back on the Block album.

In addition, Garrett's 1988 solo album Kiss Of Life includes "Baby's Got It Bad", a version of Jackson's "Got The Hots" with rewritten lyrics. "Got The Hots" was an unreleased track from the Thriller sessions at the time, but has since been released.

In 1989, she forayed into the acting world, starring in a TV sitcom pilot for NBC called "Wally and the Valentines" opposite William Ragsdale, Audrey Meadows, Tatyana Ali, Tevin Campbell and Cindy Herron.

=== 1990s ===
In 1990, she became host of the show America's Top 10. In 1995 Garrett was also involved with Maysa Leak's (of the group Incognito) solo debut album as co-writer of the track "Sexy" in which she also sang backing vocals.

Garrett also toured with Michael Jackson from 1992 to 1993 on his Dangerous World Tour, singing backing vocals and duetting with him for "I Just Can't Stop Loving You". In the Dangerous album, Garrett also wrote a song "Keep the Faith" with Michael Jackson and Glen Ballard, the co-songwriter of "Man in the Mirror". She appears in the concert film "Michael Jackson Live in Bucharest: The Dangerous Tour".

In 1996, she joined the Brand New Heavies, collaborating on just one album, 1997's Shelter. As part of the band, she co-wrote their top 5 hit "Sometimes" and enjoyed a minor hit with a cover of Carole King's "You've Got A Friend". Garrett left the group in early 1998 to concentrate on her own songwriting. In 1997, she wrote "Be Good or Be Gone" for Edyta Górniak.

=== 2000s ===
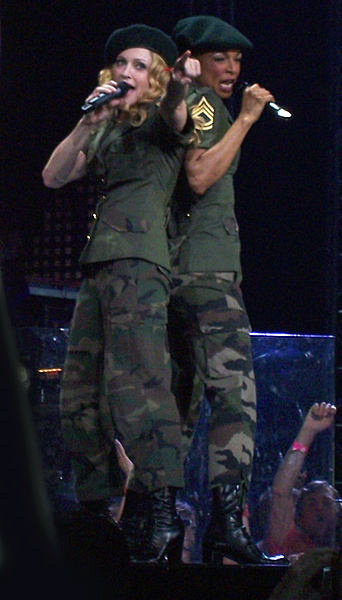
Garrett performing with Madonna during the latter's Re-Invention World Tour (2004)

Garrett supported Madonna as a backing singer and dancer on The Re-Invention Tour in 2004. Garrett's professional involvement with Madonna goes back some years as she previously supplied backing vocals on some of Madonna's earlier material including True Blue (1986), and Who's That Girl (1987).

In 2006, Garrett contributed her songwriting services to Bill Condon's film adaptation of Dreamgirls, providing lyrics for two of the four new songs added to the score. One of her compositions, the Jennifer Hudson solo "Love You I Do", earned Garrett a nomination for the 2007 Academy Award for Best Original Song. At the 50th Grammy Awards Garrett along with Henry Krieger won the Grammy for Best Song-Motion Picture TV, Visual Media for "Love You I Do".

She represented America in the opening ceremony of 2007 Special Olympics World Summer Games singing the song "I Know I Can", and in the opening ceremony of Expo 2010 Shanghai China, singing the song "Better City, Better Life" with Jonathan Buck, both songs which she co-wrote with Quincy Jones.

=== 2010s ===
Garrett co-wrote four songs for the 2011 film Rio, where she is also a featured artist on the soundtrack on the song "Funky Monkey". The song "Real In Rio" (co-written by Garrett, Sergio Mendes, and Carlinhos Brown) was nominated for an Oscar for Best Original Song.

In 2011, she appeared on American Idol singing with contestants Haley Reinhart and Jacob Lusk, with whom she sang her song "Man in the Mirror".

Garrett's single "Keep On Lovin' You", a tribute to Michael Jackson and an answer to their duet "I Just Can't Stop Loving You", was made available on iTunes September 11, 2012.

In 2014, Garrett was invited by producer Gerry Gallagher to record with Latin rock legends El Chicano as well as Alphonse Mouzon, Brian Auger, Alex Ligertwood, Ray Parker Jr., Vikki Carr, David Paich, Spencer Davis, Lenny Castro, Jessy J, Marcos J. Reyes, Salvador Santana, Walfredo Reyes Jr., Pete Escovedo and Peter Michael Escovedo and she is featured on vocals with David Paich on Gallagher's arrangement and remake of the Toto song "Africa" on Gallagher's most recent studio album due out in 2019.

In 2017, Garrett was honored with a Lifetime Achievement Award by The National R&B Music Society in Philadelphia, Pa. The award was presented to Garrett by recording artist Kathy Sledge of Sister Sledge.

In 2019, Garrett attended Kingvention, the European Michael Jackson Convention which took place in Central London on September 21, 2019. Garrett spoke about her time with Michael Jackson in a live interview with Pez Jax and performed "Man In The Mirror".

=== 2020s ===
In 2022, Garrett was inducted into the Women Songwriters Hall of Fame held in Washington D.C.

Garrett is writing the lyrics for the upcoming Broadway musical Black Orpheus, which is based on the 1959 film Black Orpheus. The music will be composed by Carlinhos Brown. She is also a part of the songwriting team alongside Stephen Bray and Brenda Russell (in place of the late Allee Willis) for the 2023 film The Color Purple.

In 2024, Garrett returned as a guest at Kingvention, the Michael Jackson fan convention, for its inaugural Los Angeles edition.

== Personal life ==
When performing at the "Race to Erase MS" event in 2017, she announced that she had received a multiple sclerosis diagnosis.

== Discography ==
Studio albums

- Kiss of Life (1988)
- Siedah (2003)

Collaboration albums

- Plush (with Plush) (1982)
- Shelter (with the Brand New Heavies) (1997)

=== Singles ===
List of singles, with selected chart positions
Title	Year	Peak chart positions			Certifications
Title	Year	US	US R&B	UK	Certifications
"Don't Look Any Further" (with Dennis Edwards)	1984	72	2	45	
"Curves"	1985	—	—	—	
"Do You Want It Right Now"	1985	—	63	—	
"I Just Can't Stop Loving You" (with Michael Jackson)	1987	1	1	1	RIAA: Gold
"Everchanging Times"	1987	—	44	—	
"K.I.S.S.I.N.G"	1988	97	16	77	
"Refuse to Be Loose"	1988	—	—	—	
"Innocent Side"	1988	—	—	—	
"I Don't Go for That" (with Quincy Jones)	1989	—	15	—	
"I'm Yours" (with Quincy Jones featuring El DeBarge)	1989	—	73	—	
"Listen Up" (with Quincy Jones featuring Al B. Sure, El DeBarge, James Ingram, Karyn White, Ray Charles, Tevin Campbell and The Winans)	1989	—	—	—	
"The Places You Find Love" (with Quincy Jones featuring Chaka Khan)	1990	—	39	—	
"What I Know"	2003	—	—	—	
"Rain Down Love" (with Freemasons)	2007	—	—	12	
"I Want Your Soul" (with Armand van Helden)	2007	—	—	19	
"Funky Bahia" (with Sergio Mendes featuring will.i.am)	2008	—	—	—	
"Keep On Lovin' You"	2012	—	—	—	
"Man in the Mirror" (with BoA)	2018	—	—	—	

=== Background vocals ===
- "Supernatural Love" (Donna Summer, Cats Without Claws) (Geffen Records, 1984)
- "There Goes My Baby" (Donna Summer, Cats Without Claws) (Geffen Records, 1984)
- "Fine Fine Fella (Got To Have You)" (Patti Austin, Patti Austin LP) (Qwest / Warner Bros., 1984)
- "The Collector" (Cerrone EP) (II Discotto Productions, 1985)
- "Love Rusts" (Starship, Knee Deep in the Hoopla) (Grunt/RCA, 1985)
- "Baby Love" (Regina single) (Atlantic Records, 1986)
- "Prove Me Right" (Shannon, Love Goes All the Way CD) (Atlantic Records, 1986)
- "Love Goes All the Way" (Shannon, Love Goes All the Way CD) (Atlantic Records, 1986)
- "The Flat Horizon" & "Everybody Have Fun Tonight" (Wang Chung, Mosaic CD) (Geffen Records, 1986)
- "This Is This!" (Weather Report, This Is This! CD) (CBS Records, 1986)
- "Face the Face" (Weather Report, This Is This CD) (CBS Records, 1986)
- "Jungle Stuff" (Weather Report, This Is This CD) (CBS Records, 1986)
- "Papa Don't Preach" (Madonna, True Blue CD) (Sire / WB, 1986)
- "Where's the Party" (Madonna, True Blue CD) (Sire / WB, 1986)
- "True Blue" (Madonna, True Blue CD) (Sire / WB, 1986)
- "La Isla Bonita" (Madonna, True Blue CD) (Sire / WB, 1986)
- "Love Makes the World Go Round" (Madonna, True Blue CD) (Sire / WB, 1986)
- "What I Like" (Anthony And The Camp, What I Like 12") (WB / Jellybean, 1986)
- "Your Smile" (Sarah Vaughan, Brazilian Romance CD) (CBS Records, 1987)
- "Man in the Mirror" (Michael Jackson, Bad CD) (Epic / MJJ, 1987)
- "Each Time You Break My Heart" (Nick Kamen, Nick Kamen CD) (Sire / WB, 1987)
- "Boys Night Out" (Timothy B. Schmit, Timothy B CD) (MCA, 1987)
- "Betcha" (Jon Anderson, In The City Of Angels CD) (CBS Records, 1988)
- "Right Out of My Head" (Boz Scaggs, Other Roads CD) (CBS Records, 1988)
- "Crimes of Passion" (Boz Scaggs, Other Roads CD) (CBS Records, 1988)
- "The Night of Van Gogh" (Boz Scaggs, Other Roads CD) (CBS Records, 1988)
- "The Places You Find Love" (Barbra Streisand, Till I Loved You CD) (CBS Records, 1988)
- "Best of Times" (Peter Cetera, One More Story CD) (WB, 1988)
- "Peace of Mind" (Peter Cetera, One More Story CD) (WB, 1988)
- "Kiss Me the Way You Did Last Night" (Carpenters, Lovelines CD) (A&M Records, 1989)
- "The Secret Garden" (Quincy Jones featuring Al B. Sure!, El DeBarge, James Ingram and Barry White, Quincy Jones, Back On The Block CD, Qwest/Warner Bros., 1989)
- "Higher Than High" (Tony LeMans, Higher Than High 12") (Paisly Park / WB 1989)
- "The Best Man" (Glenn Medeiros, Glenn Medeiros CD) (MCA Records, 1990)
- "What He Has" (Thelma Houston, Throw You Down CD) (Reprise, 1990)
- "Do You Love As Good As You Look" (Jellybean, Spillin' The Beans CD) (Atlantic, 1991)
- "Tell Me" (Go West, Indian Summer CD) (Crysalis Records UK, 1992)
- "Commitment Of The Heart" (Clive Griffin, Clive Griffin CD) (550 Music / Epic, 1993)
- "I Never Even Told You" (Tia Carrere, Dream CD) (Reprise, 1993)
- "Love Talk to Me" (Cindy Mizelle, Cindy Mizelle CD) (East West Records, 1994)
- "This Too Shall Pass" (Phyllis Hyman, I Refuse To Be Lonely CD) (PIR, 1995)
- "Sexy" (Maysa, Maysa CD) (Blue Thumb Records, 1995)
- "Jook Joint Intro" (Quincy Jones featuring Barry White, Bono, Brandy, Chaka Khan, Charlie Wilson, Gloria Estefan, James Moody, Patti Austin, Ray Charles, Siedah Garrett & Stevie Wonder) (Qwest / Warner Bros., 1995)
- "You Put a Move on My Heart" (Tamia, Tamia CD) (Warner Bros., 1998)
- "This Could Be Real" (Richard Elliot, Chill Factor) (Blue Note Records, 1999)
- "What You Give You Get Back" (Scorpions, Eye To Eye) (EastWest Records, 1999)
- "Sweet Freedom" (Michael McDonald, The Voice Of Michael McDonald) (Rhino Records, 2000)
- "I Live For Your Love" (Natalie Cole, Love Songs CD) (Elektra Records, 2001)
- "On the Way to Love" (Patti Austin, On The Way To Love CD) (Warner Bros., 2001)
- "The Game of Love" (Santana, Shaman CD) (Arista, 2002)
- "Seasons Change" (Anastacia, Anastacia CD) (Epic Records, 2004)
- "Left Outside Alone" (Anastacia, Anastacia CD) (Epic Records, 2004)
- "Time" (Anastacia, Anastacia CD) (Epic Records, 2004)
- "Are You Man Enough? / Orange Wig Skit" (RuPaul, Red Hot CD) (RuCo Ltd, 2004)
- "Superman" (RuPaul, Red Hot CD) (RuCo Ltd, 2004)
- "A Public Affair" (Jessica Simpson, A Public Affair CD) (Epic, 2006)
- "The Lover in Me" (Jessica Simpson, A Public Affair CD) (Epic, 2006)
- "Man in the Mirror" (BoA, SM STATION 2) (SM Entertainment, 2018)

=== Album credits ===
- "Cats Without Claws" (Donna Summer, Cats Without Claws) (Geffen Records, 1984)
- "Pebbles" (Pebbles, Pebbles) (MCA Records, 1987)
- "One More Story" (Peter Cetera, One More Story CD) (WB, 1988)
- "Harry's Cafe De Wheels" (Peter Blakeley, Harry's Cafe De Wheels CD) (Capitol Records, 1989)
- "Pink Mischief" (Jeannette Katt, Pink Mischief CD) (A&M Records, 1992)
- "Stupid Man" (Thomas Helmig, Stupid Man CD) (BMG, 1994)
- "Bête Noire" (Bryan Ferry, Bête Noire CD) (Virgin Records, 1999)
- "Indestructible" (Rancid, Indestructible CD) (Hellcat Records, 2003)
- "I'm Going to Tell You a Secret" (Madonna, I'm Going To Tell You A Secret) all tracks (Warner Bros., 2006)
- "My Promise", (Earth, Wind & Fire, Now, Then & Forever CD) (Legacy, 2013)

=== Brand New Heavies singles ===
- "Sometimes" (Delicious Vinyl, 1997)
- "You Are the Universe" (FFRR, 1997)
- "You've Got a Friend" (FFRR, 1997)
- "Shelter" (FFRR, 1998)
- “Crying Water” 1997

== Filmography ==
=== Film ===
Year	Title	Role	Notes
1998	Alyson's Closet	Nadege (voice)	Short
2014	Da Sweet Blood of Jesus	Private Jet Stewardess	
2018	Revival!	Phoebe	
2019	One Little Finger	Dr. Claudia	

=== Television ===
Year	Title	Role	Notes
1984	Kids Incorporated	Herself	Episode: "Siedah Garrett"
1985	Video Beat	Herself	Episode: "Dance Beat"
1985	American Bandstand	Herself	Episode: "Episode #28.36"
1985	The Facts of Life	Rhonda	Episode: "Doo-Wah"
1987	Private Eye	Singer	Episode: "War Buddy"
1988	It's Showtime at the Apollo	Herself	Episode: "Episode #2.4"
1990	Saturday Night Live	Herself/musical guest	Episode: "Quincy Jones & Co."
1990-91	America's Top 10	Herself/Presenter	TV series
1991	Amen	Charise	Episode: "The Gospel Truth"

=== Video game ===
Year	Title	Role
2017	Dishonored: Death of the Outsider	Dolores Michaels (voice)

== Awards and nominations ==
- Grammy Award 2008 Best Song Written for Motion Picture, Television or Other Visual Media – "Love You I Do" from Dreamgirls (songwriter) (Won)
- Academy Award for Best Original Song – "Love You I Do" from Dreamgirls (2007) (Nominated)
- Academy Award for Best Original Song – "Real in Rio" from Rio (2012) (Nominated)
- Satellite Awards: Best Original Song – "Love You I Do" from Dreamgirls (2006) (Nominated)

== See also ==
- List of Billboard number-one dance club songs
- List of artists who reached number one on the U.S. Dance Club Songs chart
