= Never Let You Go (Sweet Sensation song) =

Song
- Studio: Unique Recording Studios, New York City

"Never Let You Go" is a 1988 dance single by Sweet Sensation, a female dance trio from the Lower East Side of Manhattan, New York City, United States. The single was their most successful release of five entries on the dance chart. It peaked at number one on the dance charts for one week and reached number fifty-eight on the Billboard Hot 100.

== See also ==
- List of number-one dance singles of 1988 (U.S.)
