= Never Let Go =

Never Let Go may refer to:

- Never Let Go (1960 film), a British thriller film starring Peter Sellers
- Never Let Go (2024 film), an American survival horror film starring Halle Berry
- Never Let Go (album), a live album by Camel released in 1993
- "Never Let Go" (Camel song), 1973
- "Never Let Go" (Jungkook song), 2024
- "Never Let Go", a 1995 song by Chumbawamba from Swingin' with Raymond
- "Never Let Go", a 2017 song by Sunrise Avenue from Heartbreak Century

== See also ==
- "Never Let It Go", a 2002 song by Afro-dite
