= Out of Time (Noel song) =

Single by Noel

from the album Noel
- Released: 1988
- Genre: Dance-pop; freestyle
- Length: 5:03
- Label: 4th & B'way
- Songwriters: Ish Ledesma; Noel Pagan
- Producers: Ish Ledesma; Robert Clivillés; David Cole

Noel singles chronology
"Like a Child" (1988)	"Out of Time" (1988)	"Change" (1989)

"Out of Time" is a 1988 single by Noel. The single was his second and last entry at the number-one position and was on the chart for ten weeks. Both of Noel's number-one dance hits came in 1988. Unlike Noel's previous releases, "Out of Time" did not place on any other charts.

== Track listing ==
=== US 12" single ===
No.	Title	Length
1.	"Out of Time" (Club Mix)	7:15
2.	"Out of Time" (R & B Mix)	8:38
3.	"Out of Time" (Instrumental)	9:20
4.	"Out of Time" (Dub Version)	4:00

== Charts ==
=== Weekly charts ===
Chart (1988)	Peak position
U.S. Billboard Hot Dance Music/Club Play	1
U.S. Billboard Hot Dance Music/Maxi-Singles Sales	9

=== Year-end charts ===
Chart (1988)	Peak position
Canada Dance/Urban (RPM)	19
