= Noel Pagan =

Musical artist (born 1965)

- Also known as: Noel
- Born: Noel Pagan; 1965 (age 60–61); Bronx, New York, U.S.
- Genres: Freestyle, synth-pop
- Occupations: Musician; singer; songwriter
- Instrument: Vocals
- Years active: 1986–present
- Labels: Island, Mercury

Noel Pagan (born 1965), also known simply as Noel, is an American freestyle music singer born in the Bronx, New York City. His debut single, "Silent Morning", became his first top 10 hit on the dance singles chart and peaked at No. 47 on the Billboard Hot 100 in 1987.

== Career ==
Noel's 1987 debut single "Silent Morning" reached No. 47 on the Billboard Hot 100 and No. 6 on the Dance Club Songs chart. His second single, "Like a Child", peaked at No. 67 on the Hot 100 in 1988 and became his first number-one single on the Dance Club Songs chart. Also in 1988, Noel released his self-titled debut album, which peaked at No. 126 on the Billboard 200. He topped the dance charts again later that year with "Out of Time".

In 1990, Noel collaborated with producer Tony Moran on the project Concept of One, featuring as the vocalist on the single "The Question". The track received significant airplay in clubs and on dance stations, charting on the dance charts.

In 1993, Noel's second album, Hearts on Fire, was released by Mercury Records. This album marked a stylistic shift towards pop, including a cover of "Donna" by Ritchie Valens. However, it did not achieve commercial success, leading to Noel's departure from the label.

Throughout the 1990s, "Silent Morning" was featured on various compilation albums of freestyle hits.

Noel continues to perform and record music. In 2000, he participated in the Freestyle Reunion festival alongside other artists in the genre. In 2001, he teamed up with trance producer Ford for the single "Will I Find True Love". In 2007, he released the single "I Feel Alive".

== Personal life ==
Noel resides in Bethlehem, Pennsylvania. In 2020, he was involved in a serious motorcycle accident, suffering a collapsed lung and multiple fractures, including ribs, wrist, eye socket, and nose.

== Discography ==
=== Studio albums ===
Title	Release	Peak chart positions
Title	Release	US
Noel	Released: 1987; Labels: 4th & B'way, Island, PolyGram	126
Hearts on Fire	Released: March 2, 1993; Labels: Mercury, PolyGram	—

=== Singles ===
Title	Release	Peak chart positions				Album
Title	Release	US	US Club	US Dance	US R&B	Album
"Silent Morning"	1987	47	6	7	—	Noel
"Like a Child"	1988	67	1	6	88	Noel
"Out of Time"	1988	—	1	9	—	Noel
"Change"	1989	—	—	—	—	Noel
"The Question" (with Concept of One)	1990	—	—	24	—	Concept of One
"Hearts on Fire"	1993	—	—	—	—	Hearts on Fire
"Will I Find True Love"	2001	—	—	—	—	Non-album singles
"I Feel Alive"	2007	—	—	—	—	Non-album singles
"—" denotes a recording that did not chart.

== See also ==
- List of number-one dance hits (United States)
- List of artists who reached number one on the US Dance chart
- Nuyorican
- Puerto Ricans in New York City
