= Breakthrough (Colbie Caillat album) =

Studio album by Colbie Caillat
- Released: August 19, 2009
- Recorded: 2007–2009
- Studios: Revolver Studios (Sherman Oaks, California); Henson Recording Studios (Los Angeles, California); Rocket Carousel Studios (Los Angeles); The Green Building (Santa Monica); Record Plant (Los Angeles); The Village Recorder (Los Angeles)
- Genres: Pop; pop rock
- Length: 49:07
- Label: Universal Republic
- Producers: Mikal Blue; Ken Caillat; Greg Wells; Jason Reeves; John Shanks; Rick Nowels

Colbie Caillat chronology
Coco (2007)	Breakthrough (2009)	All of You (2011)

Singles from Breakthrough
- 1. "Fallin' for You" Released: June 26, 2009; 2. "I Never Told You" Released: February 16, 2010

Breakthrough is the second studio album by American singer-songwriter Colbie Caillat. The album was released on August 19, 2009 through Universal Republic Records. The follow-up to her successful debut album, Coco (2007), Breakthrough was developed in late 2008 when Caillat returned to her home after two years on tour, with the singer setting up a "writing camp" with songwriters and producers in Hawaii and writing over 40 songs for the record.

Inspired by the fact that she was trying to find herself again and breaking the creativity chains that surrounded her, Breakthrough deals with themes of growing up, experiencing life, love, making mistakes and learning from them, as well as heartbreak and why everlasting love seems elusive. To help develop her expected sound and lyrics, Caillat worked with previous collaborators, such as Mikal Blue, Ken Caillat and Jason Reeves, while working for the first time with Kara Dioguardi, Rick Nowels, John Shanks, Greg Wells and David Becker.

Breakthrough received mixed reviews from contemporary music critics, with some praising its rich texture and for being a consistent album with catchy tracks, while others dismissing its title and finding issues with some of the song's lyrics. The album was nominated for Best Pop Vocal Album at the 52nd Grammy Awards. Commercially, it was successful in the United States, debuting at number one on the Billboard 200, selling 106,000 copies in its first week, becoming her first album to top the Billboard charts. Elsewhere, it reached the top-ten in four countries, while failing to replicate the success of her debut album in other territories.

The album produced two singles. The first single, "Fallin' for You", was released on June 29, 2009 and was a success on the Billboard Hot 100, reaching number twelve, while also finding success on the Adult radio. Elsewhere, it was a moderate hit. The second single, "I Never Told You", was released on February 16, 2010, and found similar success on the Adult charts, while being more moderate on the Billboard Hot 100. To promote the record, Caillat embarked on her Breakthrough World Tour (2009-2010).

== Background and production ==
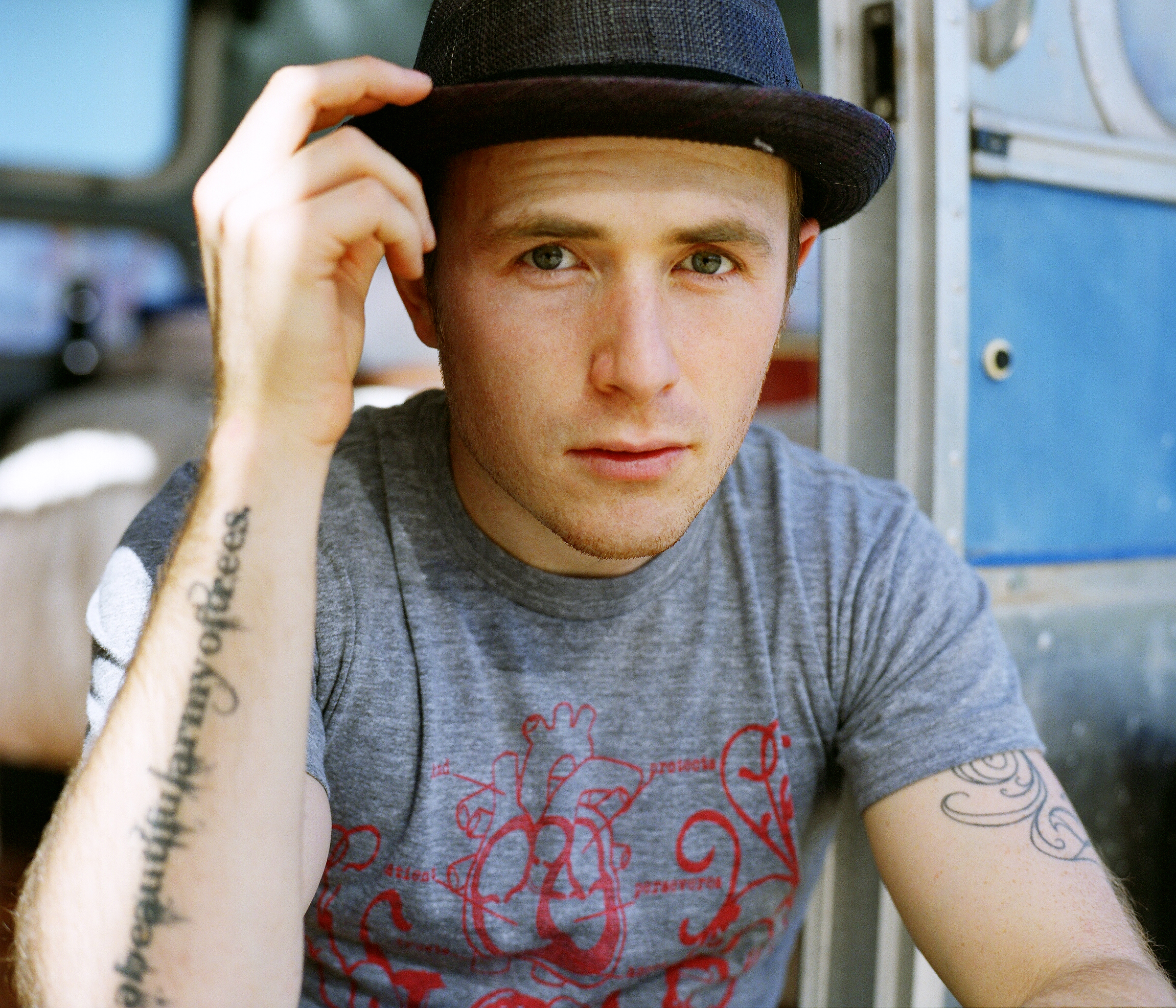
Caillat's previous collaborator Jason Reeves co-wrote many songs on the album.

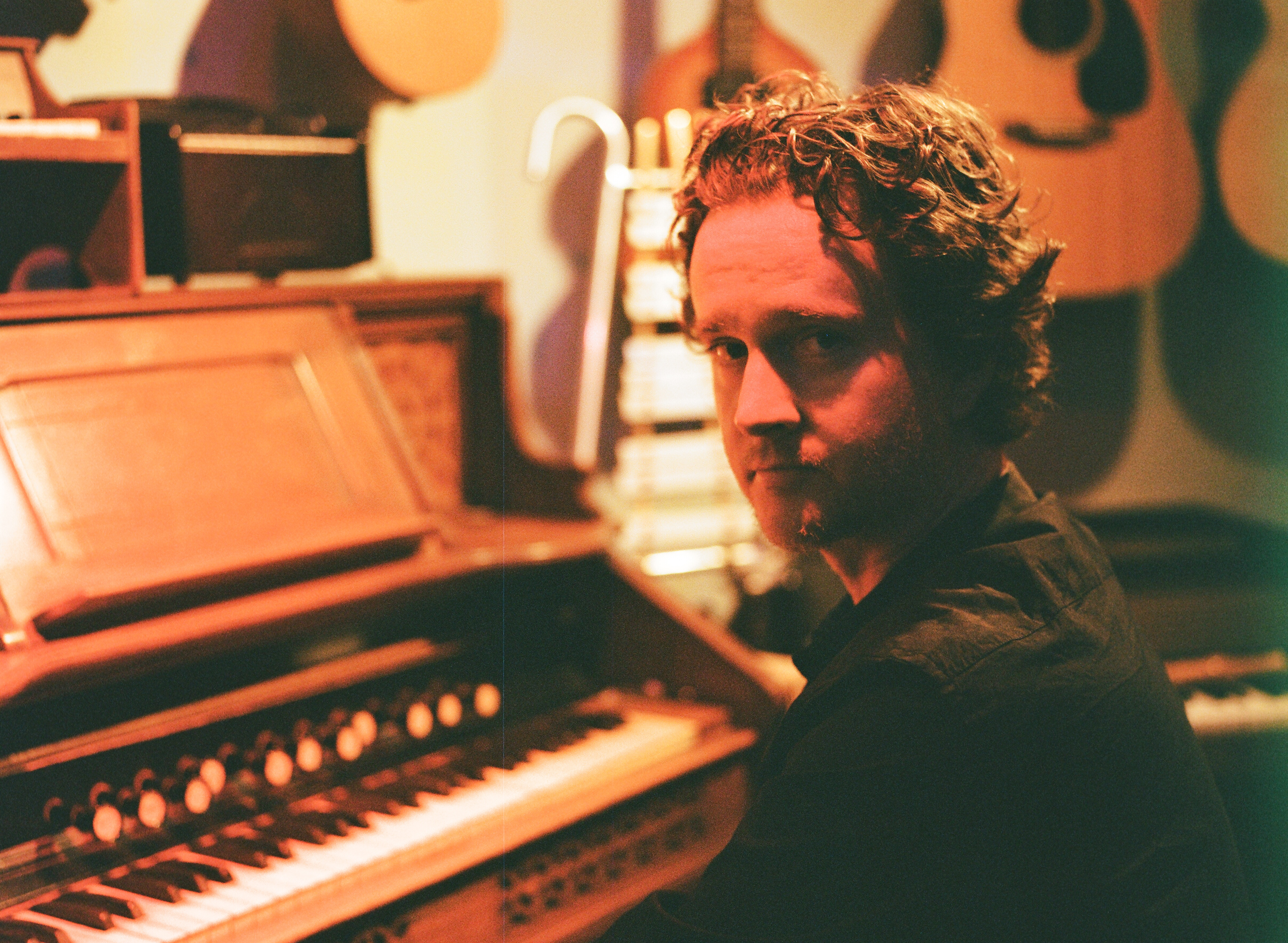
Record producer Greg Wells produced "Fearless" and worked with Caillat for the first time.

After the success of her debut album, Coco (2007), which sold over five million copies worldwide and spawned her biggest hit, "Bubbly", Caillat went on tour for two years to promote the record. At the end of the album's promotion and the tour, Caillat went home and realized she had to find herself again. According to herself, "It requires a lot of discipline to open yourself up to new influences and break the chains around you creatively. I must say this process has been the greatest learning experience for me. It's so great to be working and writing in new ways, with old friends and new." At first, she recorded a few tracks with her dad and producer Ken Caillat, however her label wasn't thrilled with the outcome and wanted new producers to rework the tracks. In November 2008, she went to the studio for the first time with songwriter and record producer Rick Nowels and did five songs with him. In early 2009, to achieve her desired sound, Caillat set up a "writing camp" in Kauai's Hanalei Bay in Hawaii and invited such colleagues as Jason Reeves and Mikal Blue, who co-produced her first album, Coco, as well as experimented working with new songwriters and producers such as Kara Dioguardi, John Shanks and Greg Wells. According to the singer, "We'd go out boogie-boarding and then come back and write songs. [...] We just wanted to be inspired by everything." In total, Caillat worked with them in over 40 songs between 2008 and 2009.

== Themes and inspiration ==
I've taken this time to look back at where I was and realized I've broken through a personal barricade, which is why I've named the album 'Breakthrough.'

— Caillat explaining the album's title.

Breakthrough was defined as an album about growing up, experiencing life, love, making mistakes and learning from them, with particular emphasis on love and making mistakes, with "most of the mistakes Caillat chronicles have to do with matters of the heart", as noted by Plugged In (publication)'s Adam R. Holz. Caillat stated that she "wanted to make music that people could listen to while driving on a long road trip, while dancing at a party with friends, while laying out at the beach or sitting at their desk at work. I wanted to give people songs that they could fall in love to, lay down & cry to, songs & stories that they can relate to so they feel like they aren't the only ones going through whatever it is they are going through in life. Music is for you to listen to & forget about your worries. These songs can mean whatever you want them to mean, they are now yours." She further elaborated over the album's themes and the inspiration behind it, explaining:

"I recently learned something about myself. For a lot of us, when life gets hard to deal with & keep up with, it becomes easier to give up on & let go of. I found myself doing that a lot & I was slowly falling apart. But...I woke up from it. I realized I wasn't happy settling for less or letting myself become someone I wasn't supposed to be due to laziness. I had to Breakthrough my fears, my insecurities & my self doubt. There are so many battles that we all have to go through in life that are for us to learn from, we grow stronger from them. I just learned this. I want to remind myself & everyone out there that we have to Breakthrough all the little things we tell ourselves we can't do because we are scared, & just step up & do them. This record is about becoming the person you want to be, having will power & letting nothing hold you back. So try not to let great things pass you by, start making things happen that you really want in life!."

== Composition and lyrical content ==
Most songs present on Breakthrough "delves into the details of romance gone awry", featuring some songs about breaking up and why "lasting love seems so elusive". On the album's first song, "I Won't", which was considered "a crisp, breathy tune that emphasizes her nuanced style," Caillat refuses to take an ex's advice to forget him, singing: "I don't wanna pretend you're not my lover." The second track, "Begin Again", "pines for a second chance when Colbie realizes in retrospect how good a relationship actually was." The song's chorus introduces some vocal syncopation and vulnerability. "You Got Me" and "Fallin' for You" were considered "innocent love songs" that "capture the breathless first blush of infatuation", with the former featuring quirky organ rhythm and a "string-laden lush pop chorus that adds horns the second time around" and the latter has a midtempo gently rocking beat. "Rainbow" has "gospel tinges near the end" with some "understated backing vocals". "Droplets" and "Runnin' Around" finds Caillat getting cold feet, with the former being a duet with Jason Reeves and the latter having an "airy 'Everybody Wants to Rule the World' vibe." In "I Never Told You", the lyrical content is about a woman's confession of how deeply she felt for a guy who left her—words she apparently never spoke, with the singer lamenting: "I never told you/What I should have said... Now I miss everything about you". "Fearless" has an electronic beat and finds the singer "clinging to her self-respect as a former [lover] walks away, while "It Stops Today" "focuses on intentionally facing our deepest hurts." The final track on the standard edition, "Breakin' at the Cracks" was considered "the most mournfully earnest song here, as [she] repeatedly pleads, 'I need you back'."

== Promotion ==
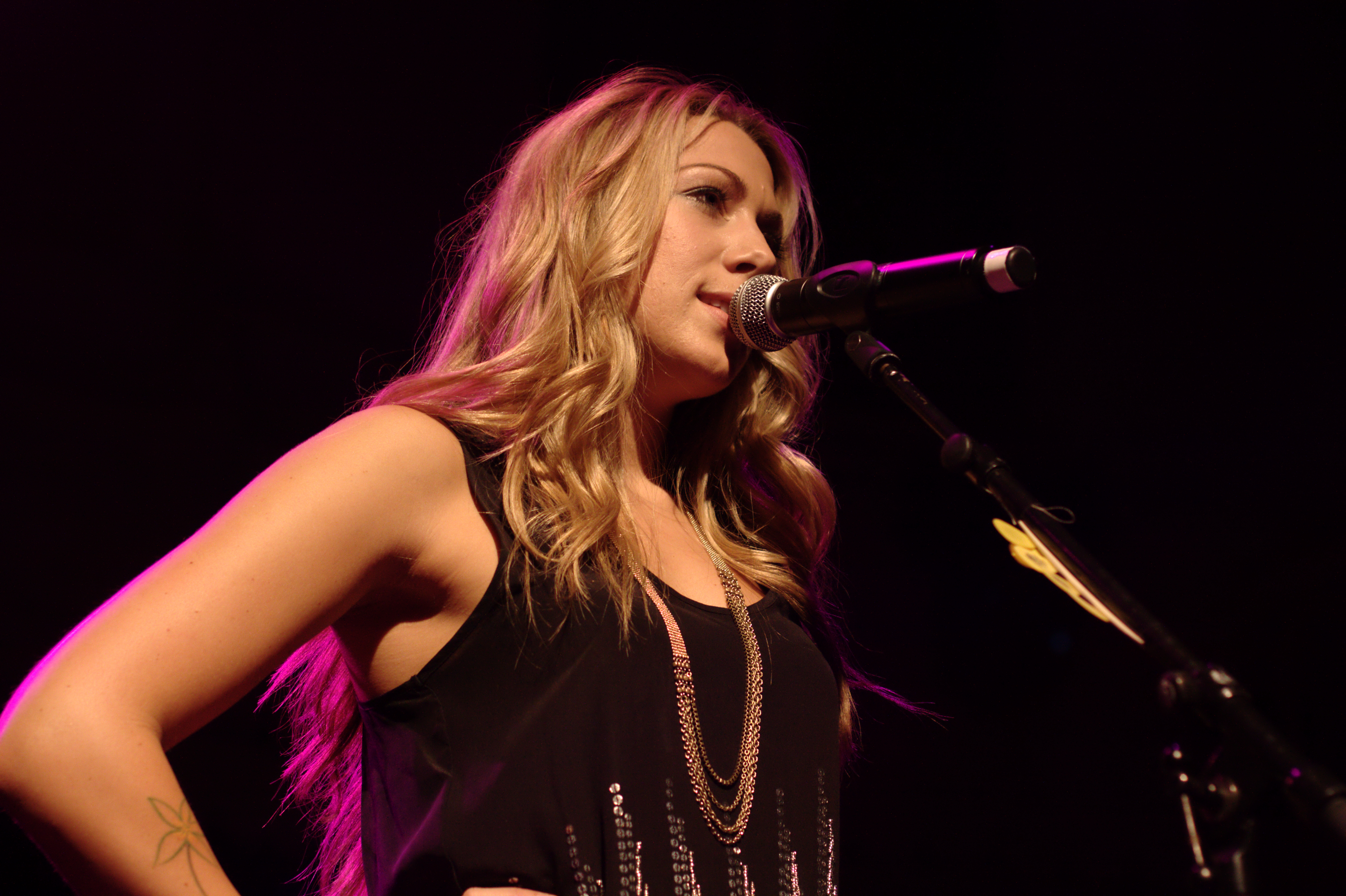
Caillat performing at the Breakthrough World Tour.

To promote the album, Caillat performed on The Tonight Show with Conan O'Brien and Today during the week of the album's release. Caillat performed the album's first single "Fallin' for You" in many television shows, as well as a set on CNN.com Live and Walmart Soundcheck. She also performed "I Never Told You", the album's second single, on Jimmy Kimmel Live. Several songs from the album were featured on many TV series and film soundtracks. "You Got Me" was featured on the films Leap Year (2010) and Letters to Juliet (2010), and also on the TV series Melrose Place, while "I Won't" was featured on the TV series One Tree Hill and Pretty Little Liars. "Don't Hold Me Down" was featured in the film Morning Glory (2010), while the instrumental of "Begin Again" was used on the TV series Life Unexpected. Meanwhile, "Fallin' For You" was on the soundtrack of the film The Back-Up Plan (2010) and of the Brazilian telenovela Viver a Vida and was also featured on the TV series Ghost Whisperer, while "I Never Told You" was also featured on the series Pretty Little Liars. To further promote the album, Caillat embarked on the Breakthrough World Tour starting September 17, 2009 and ending in 2010.

== Singles ==
The album's lead-single "Fallin' for You" was released on June 29, 2009. The "lilting" mid-tempo ballad "features an instantly catchy chorus and toe tapping melody," as defined by Melinda Newman of HitFix. It achieved chart success in the United States, reaching number twelve on the Billboard Hot 100, her second highest charting single and her highest debut with 118,000 first-week downloads, spending fourteen weeks at number two on the Adult Pop Songs and topping the Adult Contemporary chart. Elsewhere, it reached the top-twenty in four other countries and top-forty in the remaining territories. Initially, "Begin Again" and "You Got Me" were under consideration to be the album's second single, however "I Never Told You" was released instead on February 16, 2010. It reached number forty-eight on the Billboard Hot 100 and was more successful on the Adult Pop Songs, where it peaked at number three, and on the Adult Contemporary, reaching number eleven. "Fearless" was Caillat's personal choice for the third single, however it was never released.

== Critical reception ==
Professional ratings
Aggregate scores
Source	Rating
Metacritic	57/100
Review scores
Source	Rating
About.com	3/5 stars
AllMusic	3/5 stars
New York Daily News	3/5 stars
PopMatters	7/10 discs
Q	3/5 stars
Rolling Stone	2.5/5 stars
Slant Magazine	2.5/5 stars
Sputnikmusic	3/5 stars
The Telegraph	1/5 stars
Uncut	2/5 stars

Breakthrough received mixed reviews from contemporary music critics. At Metacritic, which assigns a normalized rating out of 100 to reviews from mainstream critics, the album received an average score of 57 based on eight reviews. The album was nominated for a Grammy Award for Best Pop Vocal Album at the 52nd edition, becoming her first nomination in the category.

In a positive review, Michael Lello of PopMatters praised Caillat for building on her strengths rather than making a drastic stylistic shift, highlighting the album's consistency and polished production. Writing for Billboard, Monica Herrera described it as "warm and inviting" but felt it did not fully live up to its title, while praising "Fearless" for showing greater artistic depth. AllMusic editor Stephen Thomas Erlewine gave the album three out of five stars, calling it a more polished follow-up that retained Caillat's charm. Bill Lamb, in his review for About.com, similarly viewed the album as an effort to consolidate Caillat's existing success rather than represent a major breakthrough, though he noted its improved production. Jim Farber of New York Daily News found the album charming despite lacking a true artistic breakthrough, while Q called it "brimming with late summery charms." Trey Spencer of Sputnikmusic praised Caillat's vocals, warm production, and stronger songwriting.

More critical reviews came from Jody Rosen of Rolling Stone, who was critical of Caillat's "lovelorn" persona, opining that she "fails to convince as a romantic heroine." Though being critical with Caillat's songwriting skills, Sal Cinquemani of Slant Magazine considered the album "a marginal improvement over her debut, Coco. At the very least, there's nothing as stomach-turning as "Bubbly" here, so by that measure, the album lives up to its title." Uncut noted that "Caillat has a sweet, clear voice and the songs are crisply tasteful but rarely go beyond formula." Helen Brown of The Daily Telegraph gave the album one out of five stars, criticizing its songs as "bland-yet-sickly" and comparing the listening experience to "eating sugar-frosted vanilla ice cream on a kiddie-sized roller-coaster." She viewed Breakthrough as offering more of the same rather than a significant artistic progression.

== Commercial performance ==
Breakthrough debuted at number-one on the US Billboard 200 chart, with first-week sales of 106,000 copies, becoming her first album to debut at the top and an improvement of the first week sales of her debut album Coco (2007), which started at number five with only 51,000 copies. It was also Universal Music Group's sixth consecutive number-one album to debut at the top. It was later certified gold by the Recording Industry Association of America (RIAA). In Canada, the album debuted at number five, becoming her first album to debut at the top-ten and her highest also. It was also her first and only album so far to reach the top-ten in Austria, Germany and Switzerland.

== Track listing ==
Breakthrough – Standard edition
No.	Title	Writer(s)	Producer(s)	Length
1.	"I Won't"	Colbie Caillat; Jason Reeves; Makana Rowan	Ken Caillat	3:47
2.	"Begin Again"	C. Caillat; Kara DioGuardi; Reeves	John Shanks	4:16
3.	"You Got Me"	C. Caillat; Shanks	Shanks	4:02
4.	"Fallin' for You"	C. Caillat; Rick Nowels	K. Caillat; Nowels; Shanks	3:37
5.	"Rainbow"	C. Caillat; Reeves	K. Caillat	3:58
6.	"Droplets" (featuring Jason Reeves)	C. Caillat; Reeves	K. Caillat	3:26
7.	"I Never Told You"	C. Caillat; Dioguardi; Reeves	K. Caillat	3:55
8.	"Fearless"	C. Caillat; Dioguardi; Reeves; Mikal Blue	Greg Wells	5:07
9.	"Runnin' Around"	C. Caillat; Nowels	K. Caillat; Nowels	3:49
10.	"Break Through"	C. Caillat; Nowels	K. Caillat; Nowels	3:40
11.	"It Stops Today"	C. Caillat; Reeves	K. Caillat	3:49
12.	"Breakin' at the Cracks"	C. Caillat; Reeves	K. Caillat	5:41
Total length:				49:07

Breakthrough – Rhapsody edition (bonus track)
No.	Title	Writer(s)	Producer(s)	Length
13.	"Somethin' Special"	C. Caillat; Blue	Blue	3:05

Breakthrough – International edition (bonus track)
No.	Title	Writer(s)	Producer(s)	Length
13.	"Lucky" (with Jason Mraz)	C. Caillat; Mraz; Fagan	Terefe	3:09

Breakthrough – UK edition (bonus track)
No.	Title	Writer(s)	Producer(s)	Length
14.	"Begin Again" (reggae version)	C. Caillat; Dioguardi; Reeves	Shanks	3:59

Breakthrough – iTunes Store edition (bonus track)
No.	Title	Writer(s)	Producer(s)	Length
15.	"Hold Your Head High"	C. Caillat; Nowels	K. Caillat; Nowles	4:19

Breakthrough – Deluxe edition (bonus tracks)
No.	Title	Writer(s)	Producer(s)	Length
13.	"What I Wanted to Say"	C. Caillat; Dioguardi; Reeves; Blue	K. Caillat	4:34
14.	"Out of My Mind"	C. Caillat; Tim Fagan; Reeves	Blue	4:40
15.	"Don't Hold Me Down"	C. Caillat; Nowels	Shanks	3:48
16.	"Never Let You Go"	C. Caillat; Nowels	Shanks	4:19
17.	"Stay with Me"	C. Caillat; Stacy Blue	K. Caillat	4:27

Breakthrough – Portugal edition (bonus tracks)
No.	Title	Writer(s)	Producer(s)	Length
13.	"Lucky" (with Jason Mraz)	C. Caillat; Mraz; Fagan	Terefe	3:09
14.	"Realize" (live in Porto, Portugal)	C. Caillat		5:47
15.	"Fallin' for You" (live in Porto, Portugal)	C. Caillat; Rick Nowels		4:05
16.	"Bubbly" (live in Porto, Portugal)	C. Caillat; Blue; Reeves		3:44
17.	"Fearless" (live in Porto, Portugal)	C. Caillat; Dioguardi; Reeves; Blue		6:05
18.	"The Little Things" (live in Porto, Portugal)	C. Caillat		4:33

== Charts ==
=== Weekly charts ===
Chart (2009)	Peak position
Australian Albums (ARIA)	59
Austrian Albums (Ö3 Austria)	10
Belgian Albums (Ultratop Flanders)	37
Belgian Albums (Ultratop Wallonia)	41
Canadian Albums (Billboard)	5
Dutch Albums (Album Top 100)	24
French Albums (SNEP)	23
German Albums (Offizielle Top 100)	9
Japanese Albums (Oricon)	42
New Zealand Albums (RMNZ)	31
Portuguese Albums (AFP)	11
Swiss Albums (Schweizer Hitparade)	10
UK Albums (Official Charts)	108
US Billboard 200	1
US Top Rock Albums (Billboard)	1

=== Year-end charts ===
Chart (2009)	Position
US Billboard 200	107
US Top Rock Albums (Billboard)	27

Chart (2010)	Position
US Billboard 200	132
US Top Rock Albums (Billboard)	36

== Sales and certifications ==
Region	Certification	Certified units/sales
Singapore (RIAS)	Gold	5,000^{*}
United States (RIAA)	Platinum	1,000,000^{‡}
^{*} Sales figures based on certification alone.^{‡} Sales+streaming figures based on certification alone.

== Release history ==
Country	Date	Label	Format	Edition	Ref.
Japan	August 19, 2009	Universal Music	CD; digital download	Deluxe	
Germany	August 21, 2009	Universal Music	CD; digital download	Deluxe	
France	August 21, 2009	Barclay	CD; digital download	Standard	
United States	August 25, 2009	Universal Republic	CD; digital download	Deluxe	
Italy	September 1, 2009	Universal Music	CD; digital download	Deluxe	
United Kingdom	September 14, 2009	Island	CD; digital download	Standard	
