= Like a Child (Noel song) =

Single by Noel

from the album Noel
- Released: 1988
- Genre: Dance-pop; freestyle
- Length: 5:19
- Label: 4th & B'way; Island
- Songwriters: Mary Kessler; Noel Pagan; Roman Ricardo
- Producers: "Little" Louie Vega; Roman Ricardo

Noel singles chronology
"Silent Morning" (1987)	"Like a Child" (1988)	"Out of Time" (1988)

"Like a Child" is a 1988 single by American singer Noel. The single was Noel's first number one on the dance charts, spending one week at the top spot. It is the second and last single to enter the Billboard Hot 100, where it peaked at number 67 on April 30, 1988, as well as number 88 on the R&B/Hip-Hop charts.

== Track listing ==
US 12" single

No.	Title	Length
1.	"Like a Child" (12" Vocal – 1018 Club Mix)	7:23
2.	"Like a Child" (Percapella)	3:13
3.	"Like a Child" (Radio Edit)	3:33
4.	"Like a Child" (12" Dance Mix)	5:18
5.	"Like a Child" (Heartthrob Dub)	4:01
6.	"Like a Child" (Bonus Beats)	3:17

US 12" promo
No.	Title	Length
1.	"Like a Child" (12" Vocal – 1018 Club Mix)	7:23
2.	"Like a Child" (Percapella)	3:13
3.	"Like a Child" (7" Radio Edit)	3:33
4.	"Like a Child" (7" Radio Edit)	3:31
5.	"Like a Child" (12" Dance Mix)	5:18
6.	"Like a Child" (Heartthrob Dub)	4:01
7.	"Like a Child" (Bonus Beats)	3:17

== Charts ==
Chart (1988)	Peak position
U.S. Billboard Hot 100	67
U.S. Billboard Hot Dance Music/Club Play	1
U.S. Billboard Hot Dance Music/Maxi-Singles Sales	6
U.S. Billboard Hot R&B/Hip-Hop Singles & Tracks	88
