= List of songs recorded by Nickelback =

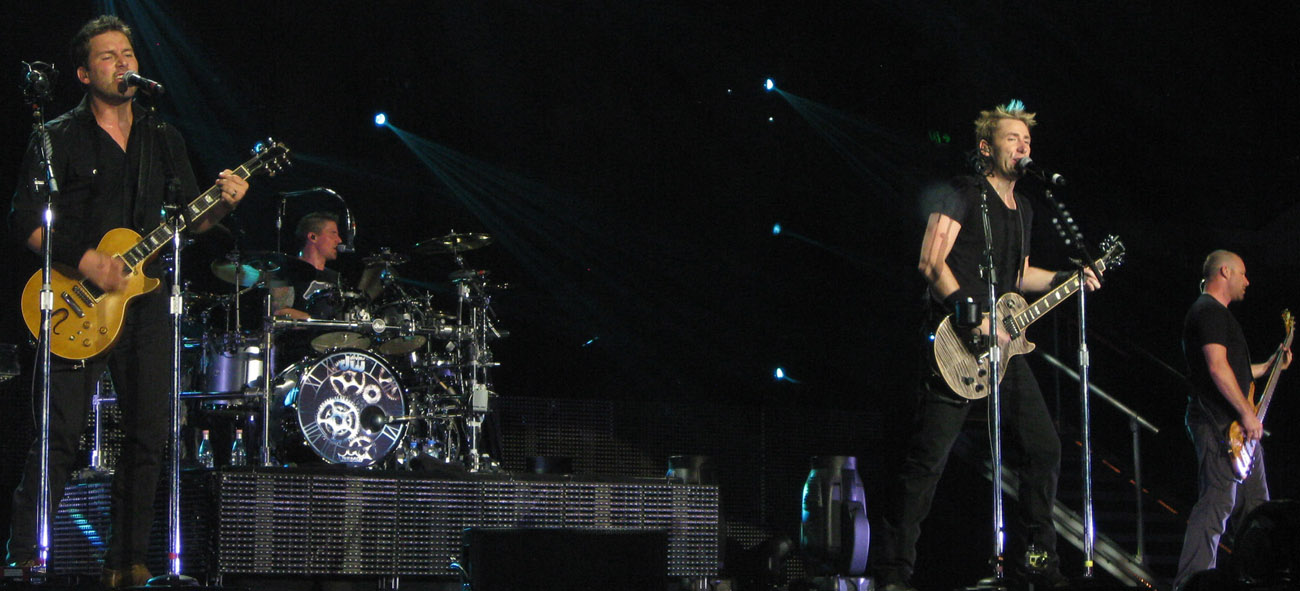
Nickelback performing in 2012. From left to right: Ryan Peake, Daniel Adair, Chad Kroeger and Mike Kroeger

Nickelback is a Canadian hard rock band from Hanna, Alberta. The band was founded in 1995 by vocalist and guitarist Chad Kroeger, guitarist and vocalist Ryan Peake, bassist Mike Kroeger and drummer Brandon Kroeger. After the release of their debut extended play (EP) Hesher, the group released its debut full-length album Curb in 1996, which featured songwriting credits for all four band members as well as producer Jeff Boyd. The State followed in 1998, once again written by all four members of the band. After Brandon Kroeger left the band and was replaced by Ryan Vikedal, Nickelback signed with Roadrunner Records and released their third album Silver Side Up in 2001, supported by lead single "How You Remind Me". The Long Road followed in 2003, again credited to all four band members equally.

Vikedal left the band in early 2005 to be replaced by 3 Doors Down drummer Daniel Adair. All the Right Reasons, the band's first album with Adair, was released in 2005. The album featured several contributions from guest musicians, including ZZ Top guitarist Billy Gibbons on "Follow You Home" and "Rockstar", while a recording of a guitar solo by deceased Pantera and Damageplan guitarist Dimebag Darrell is included on "Side of a Bullet". The band's sixth studio album Dark Horse was released in 2008, featuring songwriting credits for all four band members and the album's producers Robert John "Mutt" Lange and Joey Moi.

Nickelback began working with external songwriters on 2011's Here and Now–country music songwriters Craig Wiseman, Chris Tompkins and Rodney Clawson co-wrote "Lullaby", while The Warren Brothers contributed to "Trying Not to Love You". In the same year, the band contributed a cover of ZZ Top's "Legs" to the tribute album ZZ Top: A Tribute from Friends. The band's 2014 eighth studio album No Fixed Address contained the first featured guest spot in Flo Rida on "Got Me Runnin' Round", as well as a number of writing credits for Josh Ramsay, David Hodges and more. The band released Feed the Machine in 2017, which featured contributions from Hayley Warner, Steph Jones, Ali Tamposi, and Joe Nichols.

== Songs ==
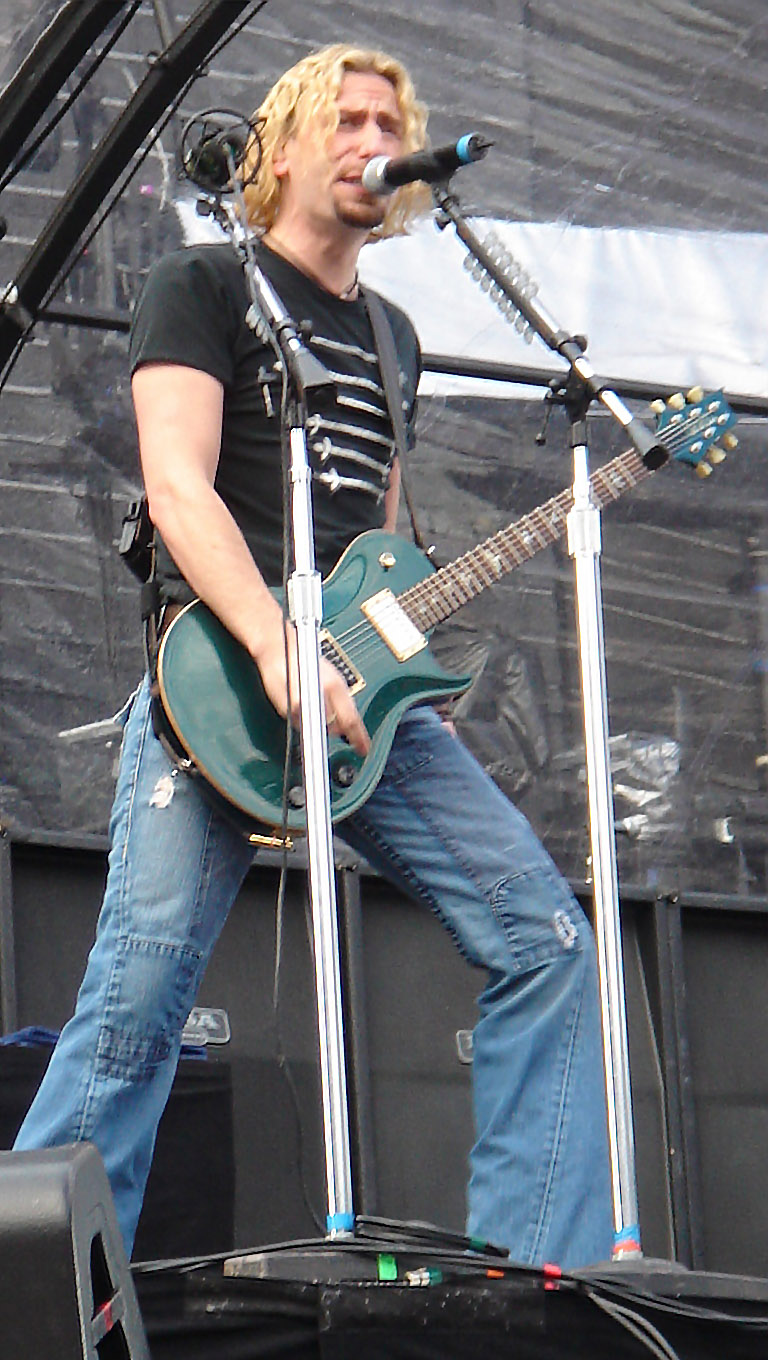
Nickelback frontman Chad Kroeger has written or co-written all of the band's material since its formation in 1995.

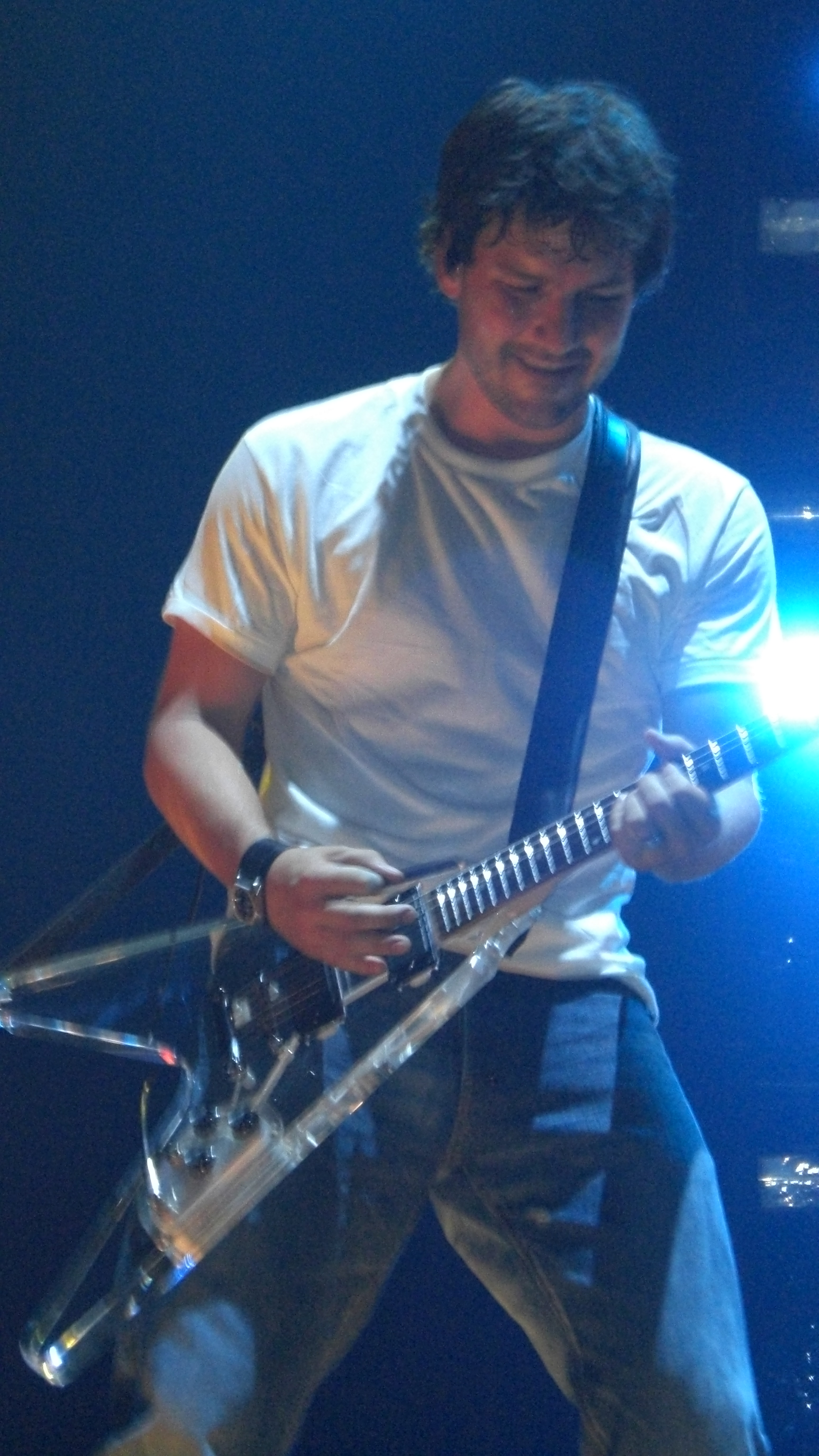
As a founding member of the band, Ryan Peake has written and performed on every Nickelback release.

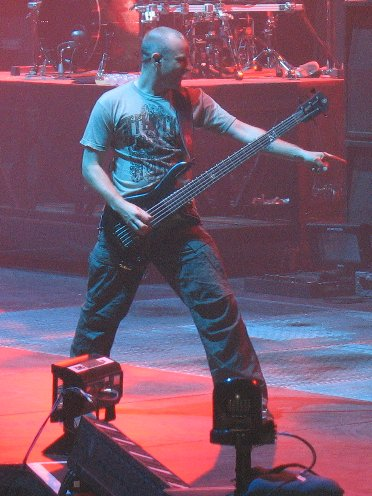
Mike Kroeger, brother of Chad, has co-written and played bass for Nickelback since the band's formation.

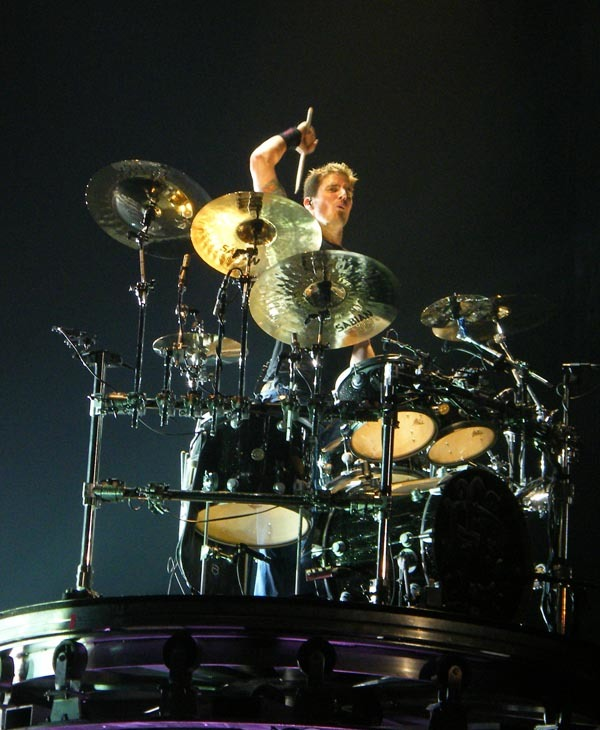
Daniel Adair joined the band in 2005, replacing Ryan Vikedal, and has performed on every album since.

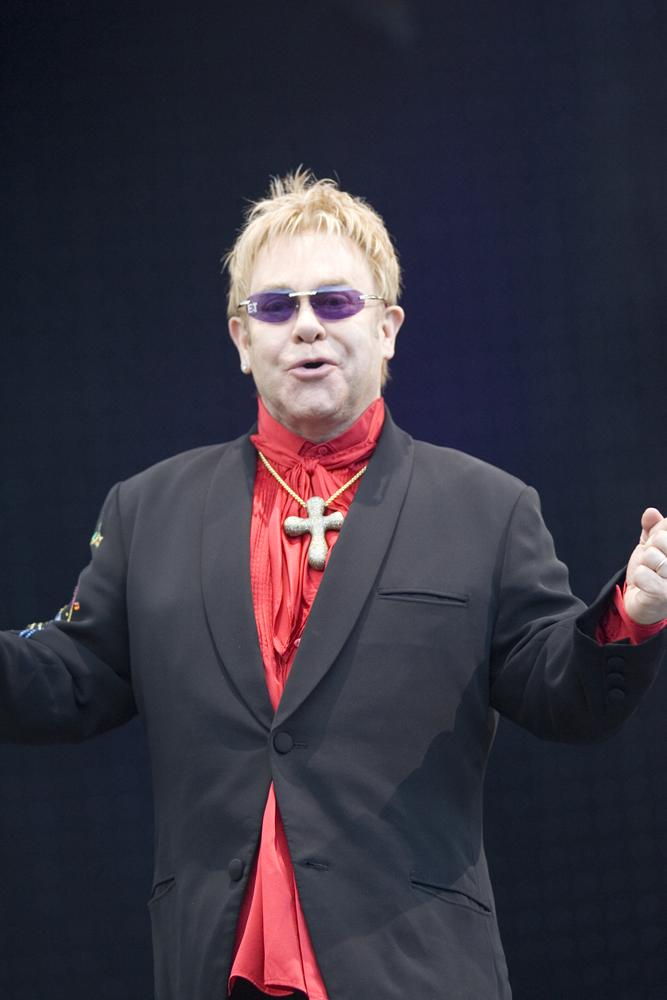
A cover of Elton John's "Saturday Night's Alright for Fighting", was released on special editions of The Long Road.

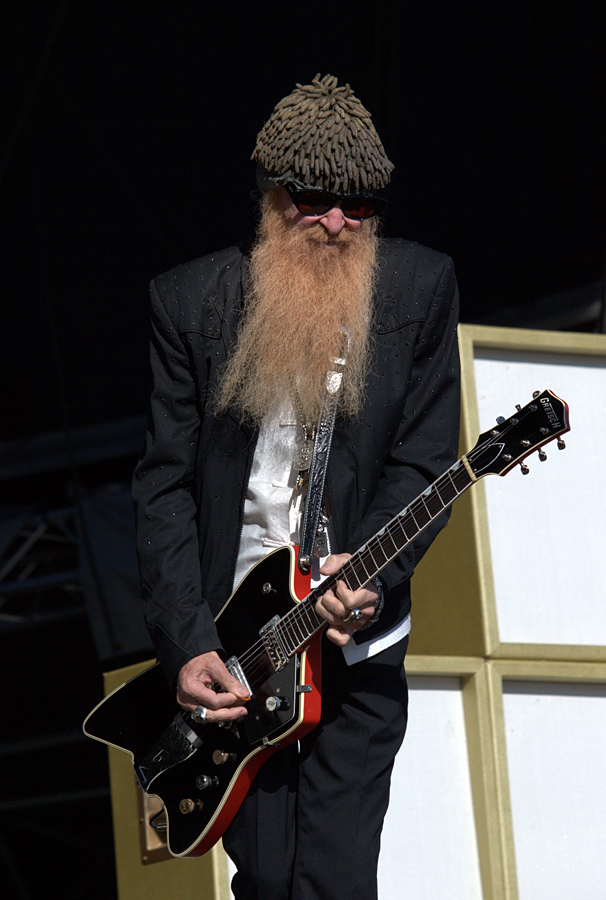
Guitarist Billy Gibbons performed on "Follow You Home" and "Rockstar" from 2005's All the Right Reasons.

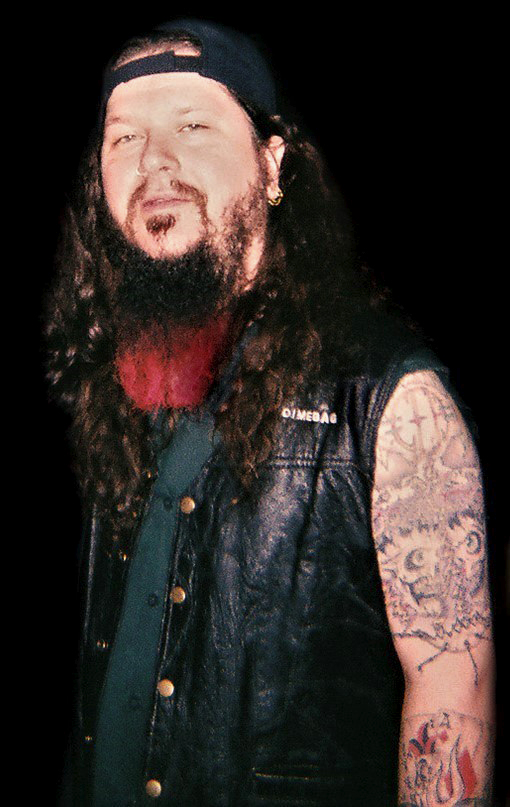
A recording of a previously unreleased guitar solo by Dimebag Darrell appears on the tribute song "Side of a Bullet".

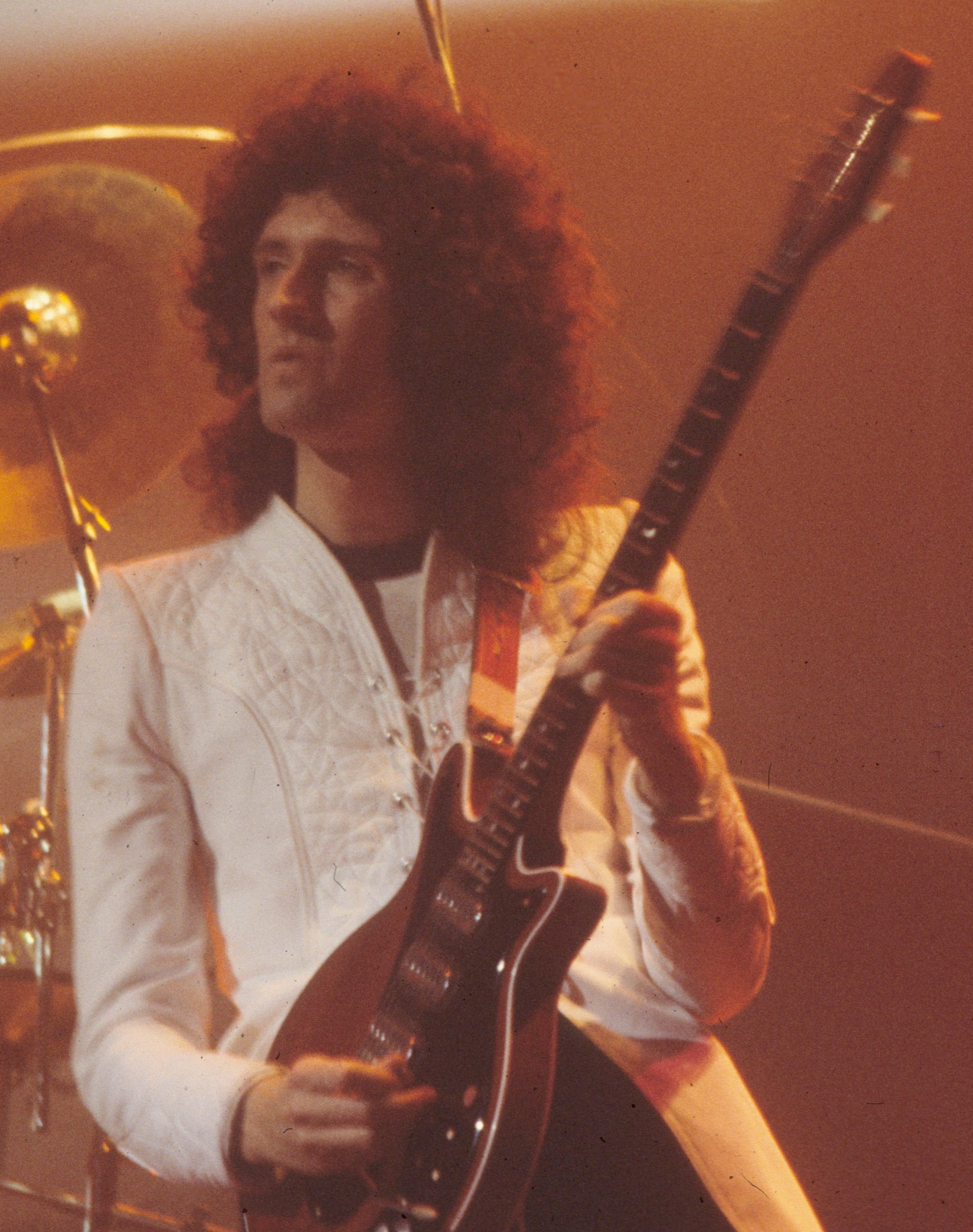
In 2005 the band released a cover of "We Will Rock You" by Queen, written by Brian May, as a B-side to "Photograph".

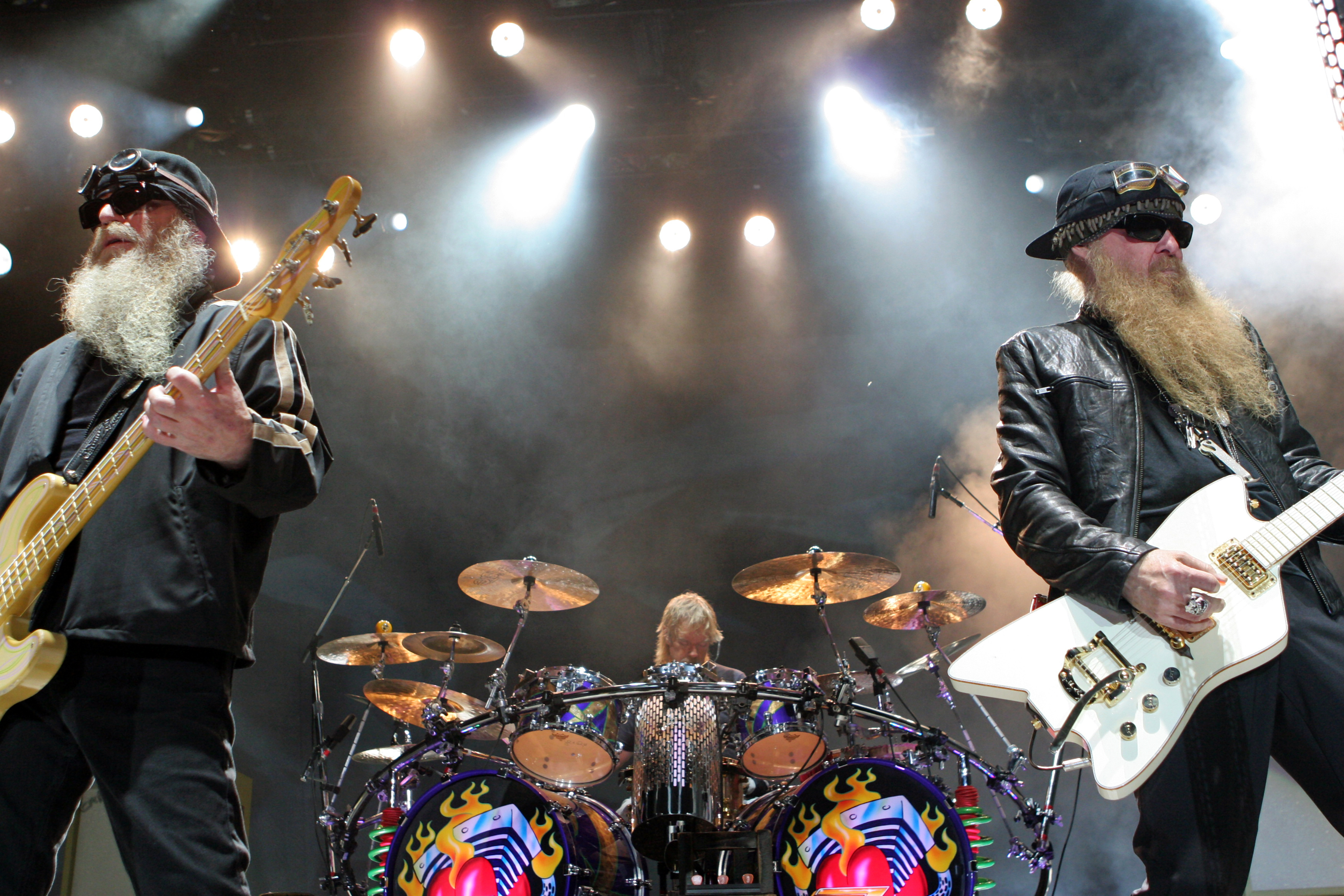
In 2011 the band contributed a cover of ZZ Top's "Legs", to the tribute album ZZ Top: A Tribute from Friends.

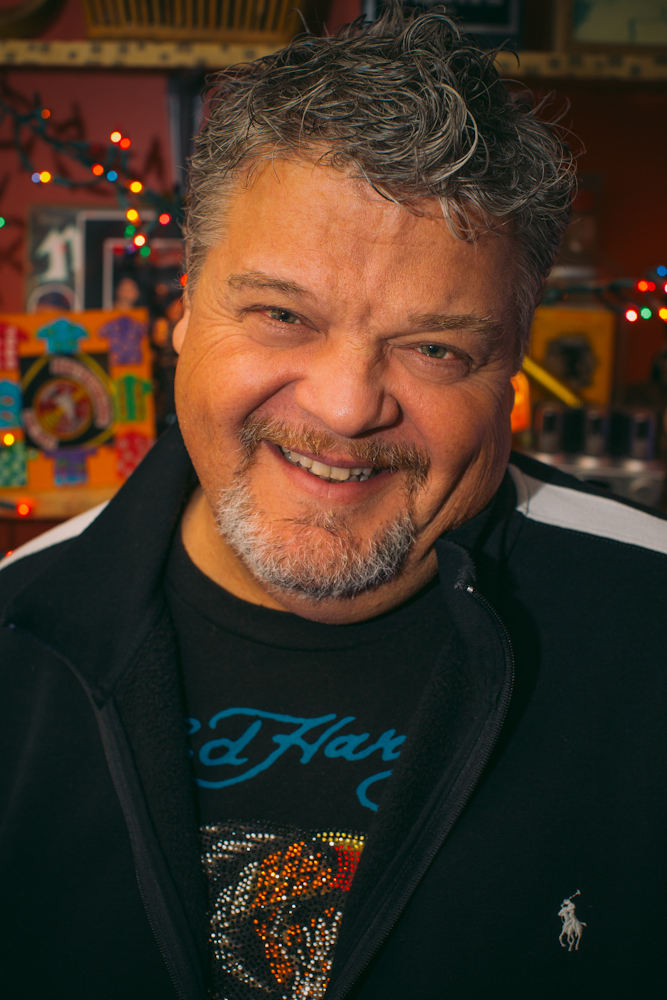
Craig Wiseman is credited as one of four songwriters on "Lullaby".

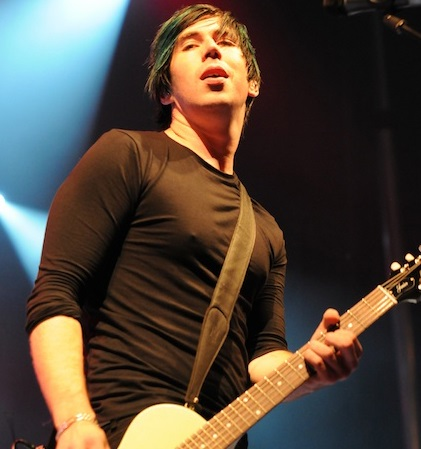
Josh Ramsay co-wrote the songs "Satellite" and "She Keeps Me Up", from 2014's No Fixed Address.

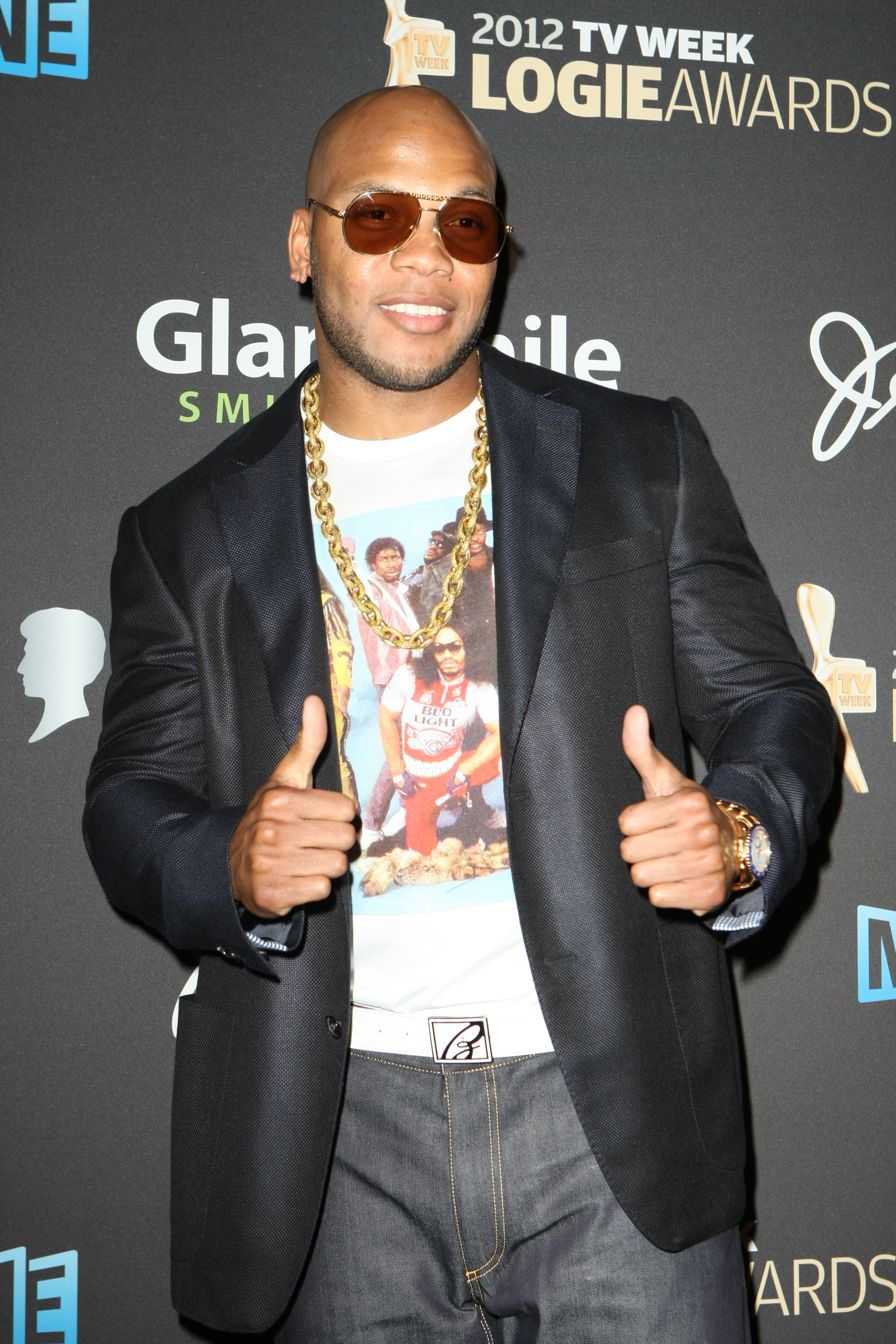
Rapper Flo Rida is featured on the song "Got Me Runnin' Round", released on No Fixed Address in 2014.

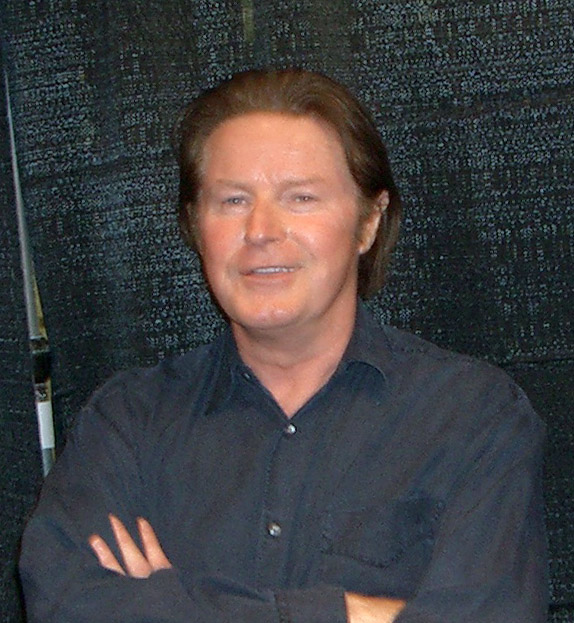
In 2016, the band released a cover version of Don Henley's 1982 single "Dirty Laundry" as a standalone single.

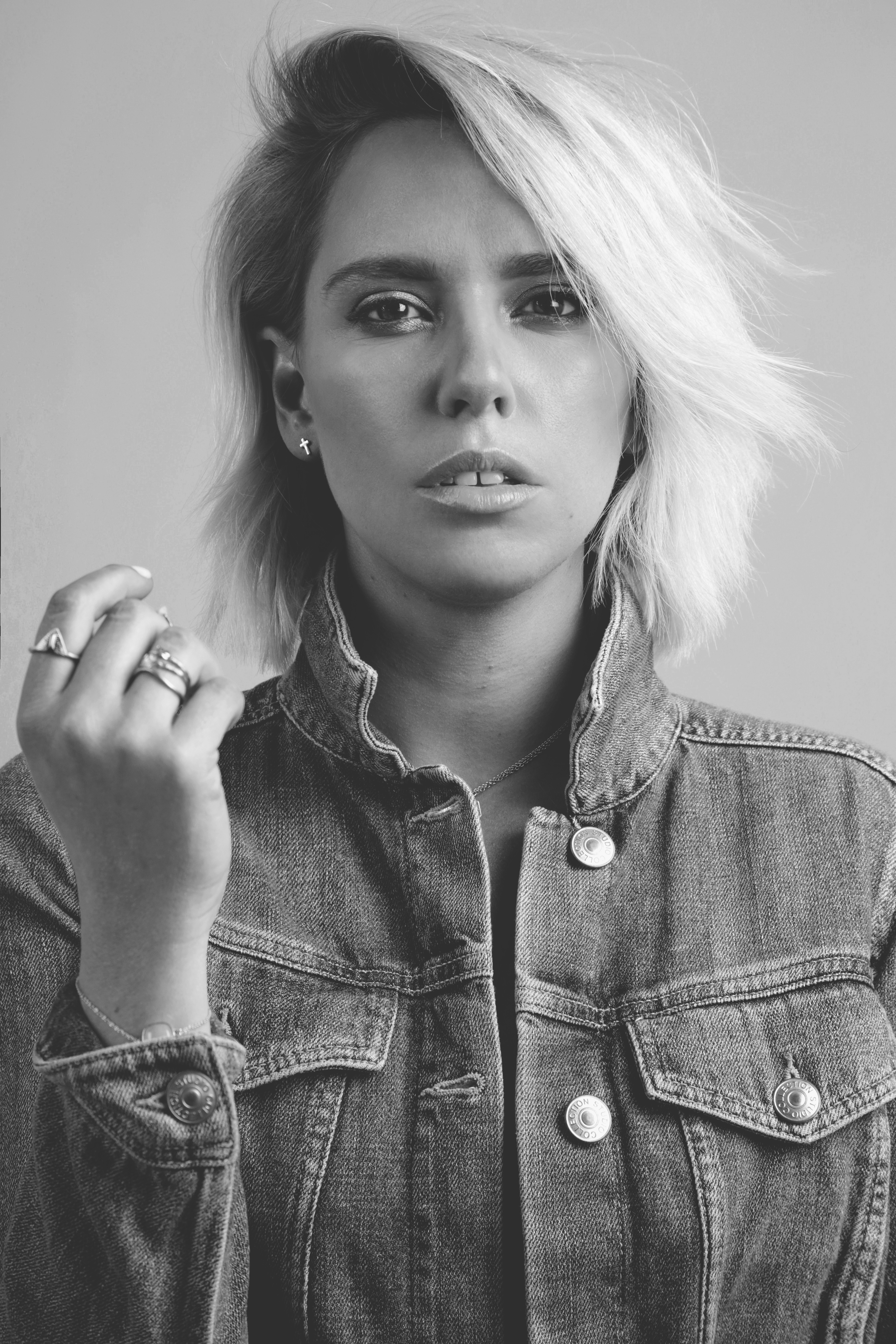
Hayley Warner co-wrote the 2017 release "Song on Fire" alongside Steph Jones and Ryan Spraker.

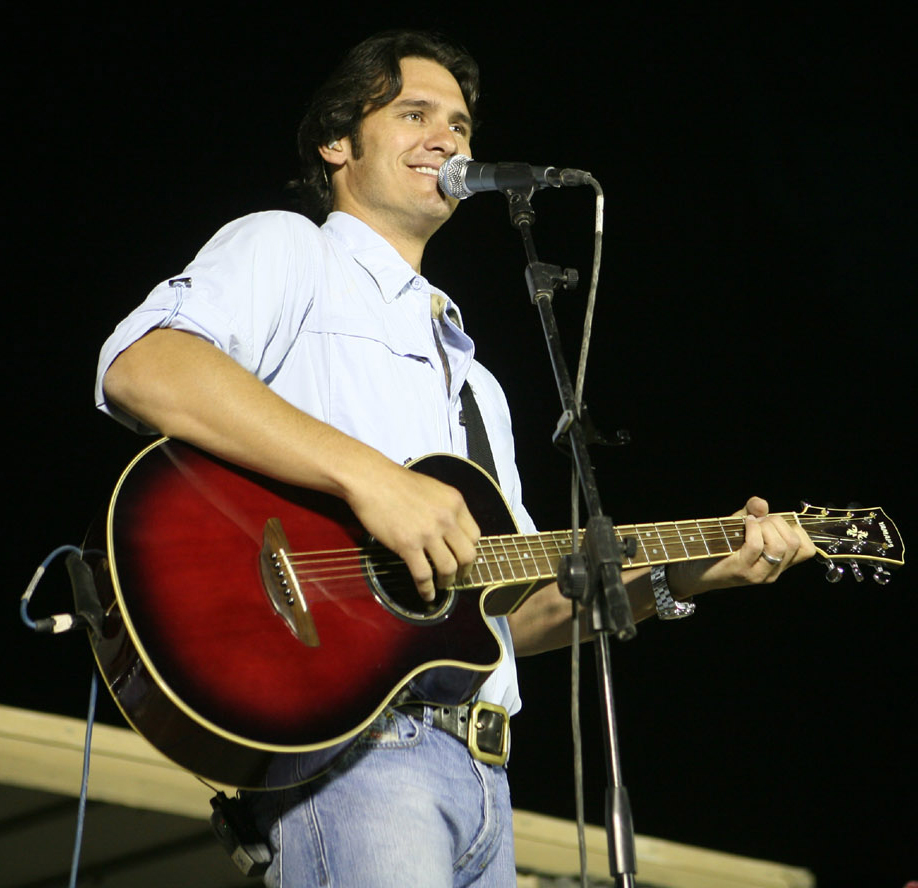
"Every Time We're Together", from 2017's Feed the Machine, was co-written by country music artist Joe Nichols.

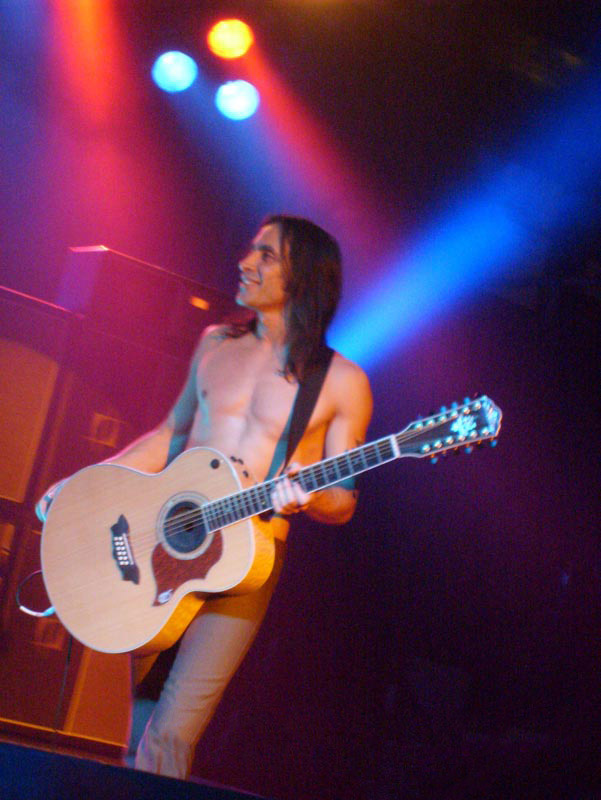
Extreme guitarist Nuno Bettencourt performed a guitar solo on the song "For the River" from Feed the Machine.

Key
†	Indicates song released as a single
‡	Indicates song written by the whole band

Song	Credited writer(s)	Release	Year	Ref.	Notes
"After the Rain"	Chad Kroeger; Ali Tamposi	Feed the Machine	2017		
"Animals" †	Chad Kroeger; Ryan Peake; Mike Kroeger; Daniel Adair ‡	All the Right Reasons	2005		
"Another Hole in the Head"	Chad Kroeger; Ryan Peake; Mike Kroeger; Ryan Vikedal ‡	The Long Road	2003		
"Because of You" †	Chad Kroeger; Ryan Peake; Mike Kroeger; Ryan Vikedal ‡	The Long Road	2003		
"Believe It or Not"	Chad Kroeger; Ryan Peake; Mike Kroeger; Ryan Vikedal ‡	The Long Road	2003		
"Bottoms Up" †	Chad Kroeger; Mike Kroeger; Joey Moi	Here and Now	2011		
"Breathe" †	Chad Kroeger; Ryan Peake; Mike Kroeger	The State	1998		
"Burn It to the Ground" †	Chad Kroeger; Joey Moi	Dark Horse	2008		
"Coin for the Ferryman"	Chad Kroeger	Feed the Machine	2017		
"Cowboy Hat"	Chad Kroeger; Ryan Peake; Mike Kroeger	The State	1998		
"Curb"	Chad Kroeger; Ryan Peake; Mike Kroeger; Brandon Kroeger ‡	Curb	1996		
"D.C."	Chad Kroeger; Ryan Peake; Mike Kroeger; Brandon Kroeger; Jeff Boyd ‡	Hesher	1996		
"Deep"	Chad Kroeger; Ryan Peake; Mike Kroeger	The State	1998		
"Detangler"	Chad Kroeger; Ryan Peake; Mike Kroeger; Brandon Kroeger ‡	Curb	1996		
"Diggin' This"	Chad Kroeger; Ryan Peake; Mike Kroeger	The State	1998		
"Dirty Laundry" †	Don Henley; Danny Kortchmar	"Dirty Laundry"	2016		(Note: "Dirty Laundry" was originally recorded by Don Henley.)
"Do This Anymore"	Chad Kroeger; Ryan Peake; Mike Kroeger; Ryan Vikedal ‡	The Long Road	2003		
"Don't Ever Let It End"	Chad Kroeger	Here and Now	2011		
"Edge of a Revolution" †	Chad Kroeger; Ryan Peake; Mike Kroeger	No Fixed Address	2014		
"Every Time We're Together"	Chad Kroeger; Joe Nichols	Feed the Machine	2017		
"Everything I Wanna Do"	Chad Kroeger	Here and Now	2011		
"Falls Back On"	Chad Kroeger; Ryan Peake; Mike Kroeger; Brandon Kroeger ‡	Curb	1996		
"Far Away" †	Chad Kroeger; Ryan Peake; Mike Kroeger; Daniel Adair ‡	All the Right Reasons	2005		
"Feed the Machine" †	Chad Kroeger; Ryan Peake; Mike Kroeger; Daniel Adair ‡	Feed the Machine	2017		
"Feelin' Way Too Damn Good" †	Chad Kroeger; Ryan Peake; Mike Kroeger; Ryan Vikedal ‡	The Long Road	2003		
"Fight for All the Wrong Reasons"	Chad Kroeger; Ryan Peake; Mike Kroeger; Daniel Adair ‡	All the Right Reasons	2005		
"Figured You Out" †	Chad Kroeger; Ryan Peake; Mike Kroeger; Ryan Vikedal ‡	The Long Road	2003		
"Flat on the Floor"	Chad Kroeger; Ryan Peake; Mike Kroeger; Ryan Vikedal ‡	The Long Road	2003		
"Fly" †	Chad Kroeger; Ryan Peake; Mike Kroeger; Brandon Kroeger; Jeff Boyd ‡	Hesher	1996		(Note: "Fly", "Left", "Where?" and "Window Shopper" were later also released on Curb.)
"Follow You Home"	Chad Kroeger; Ryan Peake; Mike Kroeger; Daniel Adair ‡	All the Right Reasons	2005		
"For the River"	Chad Kroeger	Feed the Machine	2017		
"Get 'Em Up" †	Chad Kroeger	No Fixed Address	2014		
"Good Times Gone"	Chad Kroeger; Ryan Peake; Mike Kroeger; Ryan Vikedal ‡	Silver Side Up	2001		
"Got Me Runnin' Round"	Chad Kroeger; Jacob Kasher	No Fixed Address	2014		(Note: "Got Me Runnin' Round" features Flo Rida.)
"Gotta Be Somebody" †	Chad Kroeger; Joey Moi	Dark Horse	2008		
"Gotta Get Me Some"	Chad Kroeger; Joey Moi	Here and Now	2011		
"Hangnail"	Chad Kroeger; Ryan Peake; Mike Kroeger; Ryan Vikedal ‡	Silver Side Up	2001		
"Hold Out Your Hand"	Chad Kroeger; Ryan Peake; Mike Kroeger	The State	1998		
"Holding On to Heaven"	Chad Kroeger; Mike Kroeger	Here and Now	2011		
"Hollywood"	Chad Kroeger; Ryan Peake; Mike Kroeger; Ryan Vikedal ‡	Silver Side Up	2001		
"Home"	Chad Kroeger	Feed the Machine	2017		
"How You Remind Me" †	Chad Kroeger; Ryan Peake; Mike Kroeger; Ryan Vikedal ‡	Silver Side Up	2001		
"I Don't Have"	Chad Kroeger; Ryan Peake; Mike Kroeger; Brandon Kroeger ‡	Curb	1996		
"I'd Come for You" †	Chad Kroeger; Robert John Lange	Dark Horse	2008		
"If Everyone Cared" †	Chad Kroeger; Ryan Peake; Mike Kroeger; Daniel Adair ‡	All the Right Reasons	2005		
"If Today Was Your Last Day" †	Chad Kroeger; Ryan Peake; Mike Kroeger; Daniel Adair ‡	Dark Horse	2008		
"In Front of Me"	Chad Kroeger; Ryan Peake; Mike Kroeger; Brandon Kroeger; Jeff Boyd ‡	Hesher	1996		
"Just Four"	Chad Kroeger; Ryan Peake; Mike Kroeger; Brandon Kroeger ‡	Curb	1996		(Note: "Just Four", also known as "RIP", was later re-recorded and released on Silver Side Up with the title "Just For".)
"Just to Get High"	Chad Kroeger	Dark Horse	2008		
"Kiss It Goodbye"	Chad Kroeger; Mike Kroeger; Joey Moi	Here and Now	2011		
"Leader of Men" †	Chad Kroeger; Ryan Peake	The State	1998		
"Learn the Hard Way"	Chad Kroeger; Ryan Peake; Mike Kroeger; Ryan Vikedal ‡	"How You Remind Me"	2001		(Note: "Learn the Hard Way" and "Yanking Out My Heart" were also released as bonus tracks on special editions of The Long Road.)
"Left"	Chad Kroeger; Ryan Peake; Mike Kroeger; Brandon Kroeger; Jeff Boyd ‡	Hesher	1996		
"Legs"	Billy Gibbons; Dusty Hill; Frank Beard	ZZ Top: A Tribute from Friends	2011		(Note: "Legs" was originally recorded by ZZ Top.)
"Little Friend"	Chad Kroeger; Ryan Peake; Mike Kroeger; Brandon Kroeger ‡	Curb	1996		(Note: "Little Friend" was also later released as a bonus track on the Japanese edition of The State.)
"Love Will Keep Us Together" †	Neil Sedaka; Howard Greenfield	Triple M Musical Challenge 3: Third Time Lucky!	2002		(Note: "Love Will Keep Us Together" was originally recorded by Neil Sedaka.)
"Lullaby" †	Chad Kroeger; Craig Wiseman; Chris Tompkins; Rodney Clawson	Here and Now	2011		
"Make Me Believe Again"	Chad Kroeger; David Hodges	No Fixed Address	2014		
"Midnight Queen"	Chad Kroeger; Ryan Peake; Joey Moi	Here and Now	2011		
"Million Miles an Hour" †	Chad Kroeger; Ryan Peake	No Fixed Address	2014		
"Miss You" †	Chad Kroeger; Ryan Peake; Mike Kroeger	No Fixed Address	2014		
"Money Bought"	Chad Kroeger; Ryan Peake; Mike Kroeger; Ryan Vikedal ‡	Silver Side Up	2001		
"Must Be Nice" †	Chad Kroeger	Feed the Machine	2017		
"Never Again" †	Chad Kroeger; Ryan Peake; Mike Kroeger; Ryan Vikedal ‡	Silver Side Up	2001		
"Never Gonna Be Alone" †	Chad Kroeger; Robert John Lange	Dark Horse	2008		
"Next Contestant"	Chad Kroeger; Ryan Peake; Mike Kroeger; Daniel Adair ‡	All the Right Reasons	2005		
"Next Go Round"	Chad Kroeger	Dark Horse	2008		
"Not Leavin' Yet"	Chad Kroeger; Ryan Peake	The State	1998		
"Old Enough" †	Chad Kroeger; Ryan Peake; Mike Kroeger	The State	1998		
"One Last Run"	Chad Kroeger; Ryan Peake; Mike Kroeger; Ryan Vikedal ‡	The State	1998		
"Photograph" †	Chad Kroeger; Ryan Peake; Mike Kroeger; Daniel Adair ‡	All the Right Reasons	2005		
"Pusher"	Chad Kroeger; Ryan Peake; Mike Kroeger; Brandon Kroeger ‡	Curb	1996		
"Rockstar" †	Chad Kroeger; Ryan Peake; Mike Kroeger; Daniel Adair ‡	All the Right Reasons	2005		
"S.E.X."	Chad Kroeger	Dark Horse	2008		
"Satellite" †	Chad Kroeger; Ryan Peake; Josh Ramsay; David Hodges	No Fixed Address	2014		
"Saturday Night's Alright (For Fighting)"	Elton John; Bernie Taupin	The Long Road	2003		(Note: "Saturday Night's Alright (For Fighting)", originally recorded by Elton John, was released on special editions of The Long Road only.)
"Savin' Me" †	Chad Kroeger; Ryan Peake; Mike Kroeger; Daniel Adair ‡	All the Right Reasons	2005		
"Sea Groove"	Chad Kroeger; Ryan Peake; Mike Kroeger; Brandon Kroeger ‡	Curb	1996		
"See You at the Show" †	Chad Kroeger; Ryan Peake; Mike Kroeger; Ryan Vikedal ‡	The Long Road	2003		
"Shakin' Hands" †	Chad Kroeger; Robert John Lange; Joey Moi	Dark Horse	2008		
"She Keeps Me Up" †	Chad Kroeger; Jacob Kasher; Josh Ramsay	No Fixed Address	2014		
"Should've Listened"	Chad Kroeger; Ryan Peake; Mike Kroeger; Ryan Vikedal ‡	The Long Road	2003		
"Side of a Bullet" †	Chad Kroeger; Ryan Peake; Mike Kroeger; Daniel Adair ‡	All the Right Reasons	2005		
"Silent Majority"	Chad Kroeger; Ryan Peake	Feed the Machine	2017		
"Sister Sin"	Chad Kroeger; Ryan Peake	No Fixed Address	2014		
"Slow Motion"	Chad Kroeger; Ryan Peake; Mike Kroeger; Ryan Vikedal ‡	"Someday"	2003		
"Someday" †	Chad Kroeger; Ryan Peake; Mike Kroeger; Ryan Vikedal ‡	The Long Road	2003		
"Someone That You're With"	Chad Kroeger; Ryan Peake; Mike Kroeger; Daniel Adair ‡	All the Right Reasons	2005		
"Something in Your Mouth" †	Chad Kroeger; Robert John Lange; Joey Moi	Dark Horse	2008		
"Song on Fire" †	Chad Kroeger; Ryan Peake; Hayley Warner; Steph Jones; Ryan Spraker	Feed the Machine	2017		
"The Betrayal (Act I)"	Ryan Peake	Feed the Machine	2017		
"The Betrayal (Act III)"	Chad Kroeger; Ryan Peake; Daniel Adair	Feed the Machine	2017		
"The Hammer's Comin' Down"	Chad Kroeger; Ryan Peake; Mike Kroeger	No Fixed Address	2014		
"This Afternoon" †	Chad Kroeger; Robert John Lange; Joey Moi	Dark Horse	2008		
"This Means War" †	Chad Kroeger	Here and Now	2011		
"Throw Yourself Away"	Chad Kroeger; Ryan Peake; Mike Kroeger; Ryan Vikedal ‡	The Long Road	2003		
"Too Bad" †	Chad Kroeger; Ryan Peake; Mike Kroeger; Ryan Vikedal ‡	Silver Side Up	2001		
"Truck"	Chad Kroeger; Ryan Peake; Mike Kroeger; Brandon Kroeger; Jeff Boyd ‡	Hesher	1996		
"Trying Not to Love You" †	Chad Kroeger; Ryan Peake; Brett Warren; Brad Warren	Here and Now	2011		
"We Will Rock You"	Brian May	"Photograph"	2005		(Note: "We Will Rock You", originally recorded by Queen, was also released as a bonus track on special editions of All the Right Reasons.)
"What Are You Waiting For?" †	Chad Kroeger; Ryan Peake; Jacob Kasher; Gordon Sran	No Fixed Address	2014		
"When We Stand Together" †	Chad Kroeger; Ryan Peake; Mike Kroeger; Joey Moi	Here and Now	2011		
"Where Do I Hide"	Chad Kroeger; Ryan Peake; Mike Kroeger; Ryan Vikedal ‡	Silver Side Up	2001		
"Where?"	Chad Kroeger; Ryan Peake; Mike Kroeger; Brandon Kroeger; Jeff Boyd ‡	Hesher	1996		
"Window Shopper"	Chad Kroeger; Ryan Peake; Mike Kroeger; Brandon Kroeger; Jeff Boyd ‡	Hesher	1996		
"Woe the Day"	Chad Kroeger; Ryan Peake; Scott Holman	unreleased	1995		
"Woke Up This Morning"	Chad Kroeger; Ryan Peake; Mike Kroeger; Ryan Vikedal ‡	Silver Side Up	2001		
"Worthy to Say" †	Chad Kroeger; Ryan Peake; Mike Kroeger	The State	1998		
"Yanking Out My Heart"	Chad Kroeger; Ryan Peake; Mike Kroeger; Ryan Vikedal ‡	"How You Remind Me"	2001		

== See also ==
- Nickelback discography
