= Nickelback discography =

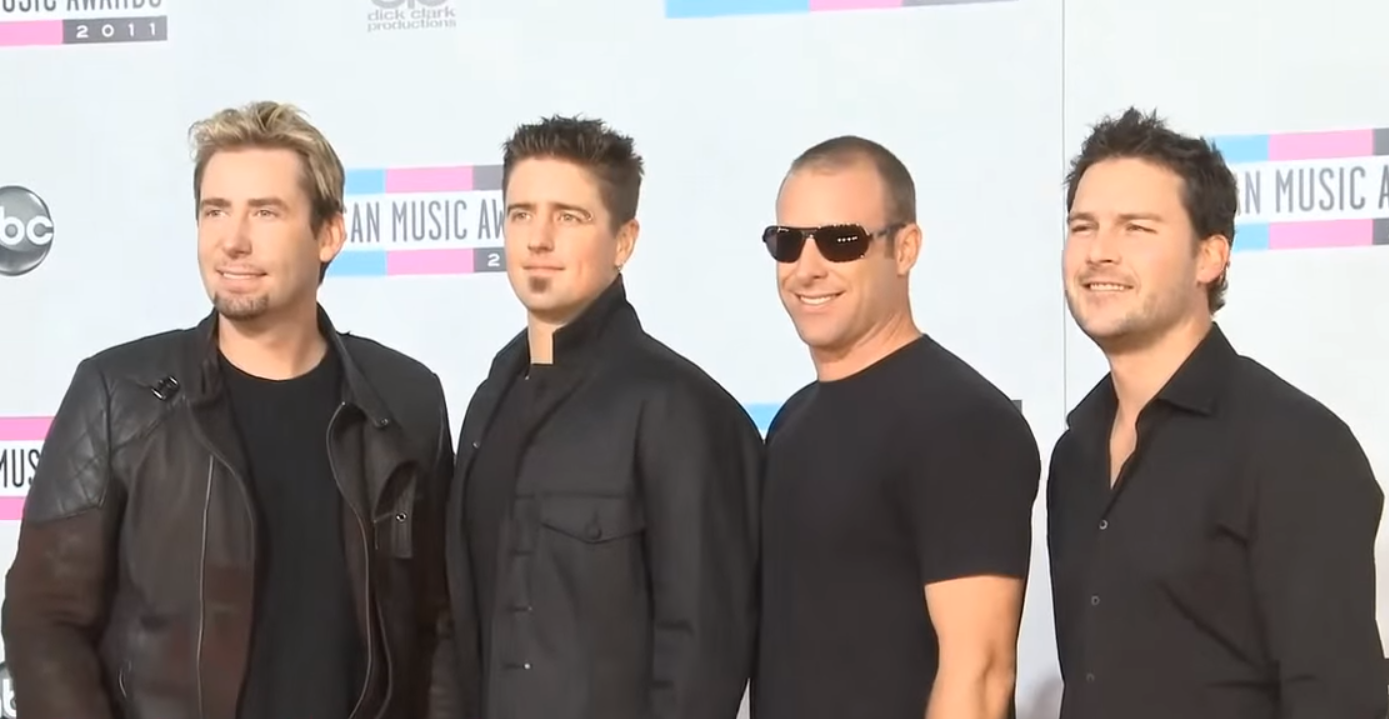
- Nickelback in 2011
- Studio albums: 11
- Extended plays: 1
- Live albums: 2
- Compilation albums: 2
- Singles: 52
- Promotional singles: 7
- Video albums: 5
- Music videos: 38
- Other appearances: 1

The Canadian rock band Nickelback has released 11 studio albums, two live albums, two compilation albums, one extended play (EP), 52 singles, five video albums and 38 music videos. Formed in Hanna, Alberta in 1995 by Chad Kroeger, Ryan Peake, Mike Kroeger and Brandon Kroeger, the band issued its debut extended play, Hesher, in 1996, followed by their debut album Curb that year through non-profit organization FACTOR, followed by a self-released follow-up The State in 1998. After Brandon Kroeger departed in 1997, he was briefly replaced by Mitch Guindon before Ryan Vikedal joined the group in 1998. The band independently released its second studio album, The State, in 1998. Following a series of performances that attracted industry attention, Nickelback signed with Roadrunner Records in 1999, acquiring the album's distribution rights and issuing it internationally in 2000. The album reached number 130 on the US Billboard 200. Four singles were issued from The State, with the first three all registering on the US Billboard Mainstream Rock chart.

Nickelback's first album for Roadrunner, 2001's Silver Side Up, was a worldwide commercial success which sold over 10 million copies and topped multiple album charts. Lead single "How You Remind Me" topped the Canadian and US singles charts. The 2003 follow-up The Long Road reached number 1 in Canada and number 6 in the US, selling over 5 million units worldwide, led by global top ten hit "Someday". In 2005, following Vikedal's departure and the arrival of drummer Daniel Adair, Nickelback released its fifth album All the Right Reasons in 2005, which gave the band its first Billboard 200 number one. The album is the band's best-selling release to date with 18 million units sold worldwide, including 10 million in the US resulting in a diamond certification from the RIAA. Its singles included "Photograph", "Far Away", and "Rockstar", which peaked at number two, eight, and six on the Billboard Hot 100 respectively. "Rockstar" is their best selling single in the United States, selling 4.5 million digital copies and was certified 12× platinum by RIAA.

Dark Horse, released in 2008, topped the Canadian Albums Chart and reached number 2 on the Billboard 200. It sold five million copies worldwide and spawned eight singles, including "Gotta Be Somebody", "If Today Was Your Last Day" and "Burn It to the Ground". It was followed by Here and Now in 2011, the band's final album on Roadrunner and final album to top the Canadian Albums Chart. In 2013, the group issued its first greatest-hits compilation, The Best of Nickelback Volume 1, featuring selections from its first seven studio albums. After signing with Republic Records, Nickelback released No Fixed Address in 2014, which was their first major label release not to top the Canadian Albums Chart when it peaked at number 2. Lead single "Edge of a Revolution" was also the band's last to top the Billboard Mainstream Rock chart until 2026.

Three years later, the group issued Feed the Machine in 2017 on BMG, which reached number 2 in Canada and number 5 in the US. In 2021, the band released its first live album, Live from Red Rocks, followed by a second live release, Live from Nashville, in 2024. In November 2022, the band released their tenth studio album Get Rollin' included the singles "San Quentin" and "Those Days". The album reached number four in Canada and number 30 on the Billboard 200. Followed by their eleventh studio album Everything Under the Sun in October 2026. The latter contains their first Mainstream rock chart topper in fifteen years "Rattle the Cage."

As of November 2026, the band has reportedly sold over 60 million albums worldwide.

== Albums ==
=== Studio albums ===
List of studio albums, with selected chart positions, sales figures and certifications
Title	Album details	Peak chart positions										Sales	Certifications
Title	Album details	CAN	AUS	AUT	GER	IRL	NZ	SWE	SWI	UK	US	Sales	Certifications
Curb	Released: May 16, 1996; Label: FACTOR (Note: Curb was initially released in Canada only by FACTOR, and was reissued later in the year by Shoreline Records. It was released internationally on June 25, 2002, by Roadrunner Records.); Format: CD	76	—	—	79	—	—	—	72	185	182		MC: Gold; BPI: Silver
The State	Released: September 1, 1998; Label: none (self-released) (Note: The State was initially self-released in Canada only, and was later reissued in 1999 by EMI Canada. It was released internationally on March 7, 2000, by Roadrunner Records.); Format: CD	—	—	—	57	—	—	—	—	128	130		MC: Platinum; BPI: Silver; RIAA: Platinum
Silver Side Up	Released: September 11, 2001; Labels: EMI, Roadrunner; Formats: CD, CS	1	5	1	4	1	1	2	4	1	2	WW: 10,000,000; UK: 1,150,175	MC: 8× Platinum; ARIA: 2× Platinum; BPI: 3× Platinum; BVMI: Platinum; IFPI AUT: Platinum; IFPI SWE: Gold; IFPI SWI: Platinum; RIAA: 6× Platinum; RMNZ: Platinum
The Long Road	Released: September 23, 2003; Labels: EMI, Roadrunner; Formats: CD, CS	1	4	4	4	9	3	27	4	5	6	WW: 5,000,000	MC: 5× Platinum; ARIA: 3× Platinum; BPI: Platinum; BVMI: Gold; IFPI AUT: Gold; IFPI SWI: Gold; RIAA: 3× Platinum; RMNZ: Gold
All the Right Reasons	Released: October 4, 2005; Labels: EMI, Roadrunner; Formats: CD, CD+DVD	1	2	7	4	4	1	22	4	2	1	WW: 18,000,000; UK: 1,072,431	MC: 7× Platinum; ARIA: 4× Platinum; BPI: 3× Platinum; BVMI: 2× Platinum; IFPI AUT: Gold; IFPI SWI: Gold; RIAA: Diamond; RMNZ: 4× Platinum
Dark Horse	Released: November 18, 2008; Labels: EMI, Roadrunner; Formats: CD, LP, DL	1	3	5	4	19	3	9	5	4	2	WW: 5,000,000	MC: 9× Platinum; ARIA: 3× Platinum; BPI: Platinum; BVMI: 3× Gold; IFPI AUT: Gold; IFPI SWE: Gold; RIAA: 3× Platinum; RMNZ: 2× Platinum
Here and Now	Released: November 21, 2011; Label: Roadrunner; Formats: CD, LP, DL	1	1	3	2	26	7	6	2	10	2	WW: 2,000,000	MC: 2× Platinum; ARIA: 2× Platinum; BPI: Gold; BVMI: Gold; IFPI SWE: Gold; IFPI SWI: Platinum; RIAA: Platinum; RMNZ: Platinum
No Fixed Address	Released: November 14, 2014; Label: Republic; Formats: CD, CD+DVD, LP, DL	2	3	4	7	30	12	13	3	12	4	CAN: 58,000; US: 320,000	MC: Platinum; ARIA: Platinum; BPI: Gold; BVMI: Gold; IFPI AUT: Platinum
Feed the Machine	Released: June 16, 2017; Label: BMG; Formats: CD, LP, DL	2	3	4	6	57	4	6	2	3	5		BPI: Silver
Get Rollin'	Released: November 18, 2022; Labels: BMG; Formats: CD, LP, DL	4	3	8	7	—	31	—	1	8	30		
Everything Under the Sun	Released: October 30, 2026; Label: Virgin Music Group; Formats: CD, LP, DL	10	3	4	6	—	—	—	4	6	29		
"—" denotes a release that did not chart or was not issued in that region.

=== Live albums ===
List of live albums
Title	Album details
Live from Red Rocks	Released: May 21, 2021; Label: none (self-released); Format: DL
Live from Nashville	Released: November 15, 2024; Label: BMG; Formats: CD, LP, DL

=== Compilations ===
List of compilation albums, with selected chart positions, sales figures and certifications
Title	Album details	Peak chart positions										Certifications
Title	Album details	CAN	AUS	AUT	GER	IRL	NZ	SWE	SWI	UK	US	Certifications
The Best of Nickelback Volume 1	Released: November 4, 2013; Label: Roadrunner; Formats: CD, DL	11	6	13	31	43	7	28	10	15	21	ARIA: Platinum; BPI: 2× Platinum; RIAA: Gold; RMNZ: 2× Platinum
"—" denotes a release that did not chart or was not issued in that region.

== Extended plays ==
List of extended plays
Title	EP details
Hesher	Released: March 1996; Label: self-released; Format: CD

== Singles ==
=== 1990s–2000s ===
List of singles, with selected chart positions and certifications, showing year released and album name
Title	Year	Peak chart positions										Certifications	Album
Title	Year	CAN	AUS	AUT	GER	IRL	SWE	SWI	UK	US	US Main.	Certifications	Album
"Fly"	1996	—	—	—	—	—	—	—	—	—	—		Curb
"Leader of Men"	2000	— (Note: "Leader of Men" failed to enter any all-genre Canadian singles chart, but reached number 11 on the RPM Rock/Alternative chart.)	—	—	—	—	—	—	—	—	8	MC: Gold	The State
"Old Enough"	2000	—	—	—	—	—	—	—	—	—	24		The State
"Breathe"	2000	—	—	—	—	—	—	—	—	—	10		The State
"How You Remind Me"	2001	1	2	1	3	1	4	3	4	1	1	ARIA: 3× Platinum; BPI: 4× Platinum; BVMI: 2× Platinum; IFPI AUT: Gold; IFPI SWE: Platinum; IFPI SWI: Gold; RIAA: 9× Platinum; RMNZ: 6× Platinum	Silver Side Up
"Too Bad"	2002	32	56	26	41	6	—	48	9	42	1	BPI: Silver; RIAA: Gold; RMNZ: Gold	Silver Side Up
"Never Again"	2002	34	—	—	—	38	—	—	30	— (Note: "Never Again" did not register on the Billboard Hot 100, but peaked at number 24 on the Bubbling Under Hot 100 chart, which acts as an extension to the Hot 100.)	1	RIAA: Gold	Silver Side Up
"Someday"	2003	1	4	11	26	18	35	14	6	7	2	MC: 2× Platinum; ARIA: Platinum; BPI: Gold; RIAA: Platinum; RMNZ: Platinum	The Long Road
"Figured You Out"	2003	—	10	—	—	—	—	—	—	65	1	MC: Platinum; ARIA: Gold; RIAA: Platinum	The Long Road
"Feelin' Way Too Damn Good"	2004	25	40	—	95	—	—	—	39	48	3	RIAA: Gold	The Long Road
"See You at the Show"	2004	—	—	—	82	—	—	—	—	—	—		The Long Road
"Because of You"	2004	—	—	—	—	—	—	—	—	—	7		The Long Road
"Photograph"	2005	3	3	10	18	24	40	27	18	2	1	MC: Platinum; ARIA: Gold; BPI: Platinum; RIAA: 4× Platinum; RMNZ: Platinum	All the Right Reasons
"Animals"	2005	—	27	—	—	—	—	—	—	97	1	BPI: Gold; RIAA: 4× Platinum; RMNZ: Platinum	All the Right Reasons
"Far Away"	2006	65	2	22	25	17	51	41	40	8	—	ARIA: Gold; BPI: Gold; RIAA: 5× Platinum; RMNZ: 2× Platinum	All the Right Reasons
"Savin' Me"	2006	2	18	43	72	47	—	82	77	19	11	BPI: Silver; RIAA: 4× Platinum; RMNZ: Platinum	All the Right Reasons
"Rockstar"	2006	39	60	5	23	2	10	14	2	6	4	BPI: 3× Platinum; BVMI: Platinum; RIAA: 12× Platinum; RMNZ: 3× Platinum	All the Right Reasons
"If Everyone Cared"	2006	7	32	12	21	—	—	19	—	17	37	RIAA: 3× Platinum	All the Right Reasons
"Side of a Bullet"	2007	—	—	—	—	—	—	—	—	—	7		All the Right Reasons
"Gotta Be Somebody"	2008	4	14	10	6	—	6	19	20	10	9	MC: 4× Platinum; ARIA: Platinum; BPI: Silver; RIAA: 3× Platinum; RMNZ: Gold	Dark Horse
"Something in Your Mouth"	2008	48	—	—	—	—	—	—	—	96	1	MC: 2× Platinum; BPI: Silver; RIAA: Platinum; RMNZ: Platinum	Dark Horse
"If Today Was Your Last Day"	2008	7	26	31	31	—	32	30	64	19	32	MC: 4× Platinum; ARIA: Gold; BPI: Gold; RIAA: 4× Platinum; RMNZ: Platinum	Dark Horse
"Burn It to the Ground"	2009	38	—	—	65	—	—	—	—	— (Note: "Burn It to the Ground" did not register on the Billboard Hot 100, but peaked at number 8 on the Bubbling Under Hot 100 Singles chart, which acts as an extension to the Hot 100.)	3	MC: 8× Platinum; BPI: Platinum; RIAA: 3× Platinum; RMNZ: 2× Platinum	Dark Horse
"I'd Come for You"	2009	29	22	37	39	—	—	38	67	44	—	MC: Platinum	Dark Horse
"Never Gonna Be Alone"	2009	25	64	73	—	—	—	—	—	58	—	MC: Platinum	Dark Horse
"Shakin' Hands"	2009	49	—	—	—	—	—	—	—	—	11	MC: Gold	Dark Horse
"—" denotes a release that did not chart or was not issued in that region.

=== 2010s ===
List of singles, with selected chart positions and certifications, showing year released and album name
Title	Year	Peak chart positions										Certifications	Album
Title	Year	CAN	AUS	AUT	GER	SWE	SWI	UK	US	US Main.	US Hard Digi.	Certifications	Album
"This Afternoon"	2010	16	27	27	29	—	69	79	34	—	—	MC: 2× Platinum; ARIA: Gold; RIAA: 2× Platinum	Dark Horse
"When We Stand Together"	2011	10	20	8	6	11	6	41	44	—	—	MC: Platinum; ARIA: Platinum; BPI: Silver; BVMI: Gold; IFPI SWE: 2× Platinum; IFPI SWI: Gold; RMNZ: Gold	Here and Now
"Bottoms Up"	2011	31	83	—	—	—	—	179	— (Note: "Bottoms Up" did not register on the Billboard Hot 100, but peaked at number 1 on the Bubbling Under Hot 100 Singles chart, which acts as an extension to the Hot 100.)	2	1		Here and Now
"This Means War"	2012	—	—	—	—	—	—	—	—	6	4		Here and Now
"Lullaby"	2012	52	58	27	36	—	45	194	89	—	—	MC: Gold; ARIA: Gold; BPI: Silver; IFPI SWI: Gold; RMNZ: Gold	Here and Now
"Trying Not to Love You"	2012	93	66	67	—	—	—	—	— (Note: "Trying Not to Love You" did not register on the Billboard Hot 100, but peaked at number 4 on the Bubbling Under Hot 100 Singles chart, which acts as an extension to the Hot 100.)	—	—		Here and Now
"Edge of a Revolution"	2014	34	54	—	—	—	—	91	— (Note: "Edge of a Revolution" did not register on the Billboard Hot 100, but peaked at number 18 on the Bubbling Under Hot 100 Singles chart, which acts as an extension to the Hot 100.)	1	1		No Fixed Address
"What Are You Waiting For?"	2014	29	40	6	11	—	7	111	— (Note: "What Are You Waiting For?" did not register on the Billboard Hot 100, but peaked at number 2 on the Bubbling Under Hot 100 Singles chart, which acts as an extension to the Hot 100.)	—	1	BVMI: Gold	No Fixed Address
"Million Miles an Hour"	2014	—	—	—	—	—	—	—	—	11	—		No Fixed Address
"She Keeps Me Up"	2015	78	—	—	—	—	—	—	—	— (Note: "She Keeps Me Up" did not register on the Mainstream Rock Chart, but peaked at number 6 on the Alternative Digital Song Sales.)	—	BPI: Silver; RMNZ: Gold	No Fixed Address
"Satellite"	2015	—	—	—	—	—	—	—	—	—	—		No Fixed Address
"Get 'Em Up"	2015	—	—	—	—	—	—	—	—	40	12		No Fixed Address
"Dirty Laundry"	2016	—	—	—	—	—	—	—	—	—	—		Non-album single
"Feed the Machine"	2017	— (Note: "Feed the Machine" did not register on the Canadian Hot 100, but peaked at number 39 on the Canadian Digital Song Sales component chart.)	—	—	—	—	—	—	—	12	2		Feed the Machine
"Must Be Nice"	2017	—	—	—	—	—	—	—	—	30	3		Feed the Machine
"—" denotes a release that did not chart or was not issued in that region.

=== 2020s ===
List of singles, with selected chart positions and certifications, showing year released and album name
Title	Year	Peak chart positions										Certifications	Album
Title	Year	CAN	NZ Hot	UK Sales	US Adult.	US Main.	US Rock	US Hard Digi.	US Hard Rock	US Alt. Digi.	US Rock Digi.	Certifications	Album
"The Devil Went Down to Georgia" (featuring Dave Martone)	2020	— (Note: "The Devil Went Down to Georgia" did not register on the Canadian Hot 100, but peaked at number 13 on the Canadian Digital Song Sales component chart.)	—	—	—	—	—	1	3	—	2		Non-album singles
"Rockstar Sea Shanty" (with The Lottery Winners)	2021	—	—	—	—	—	—	—	—	—	—		Non-album singles
"San Quentin"	2022	64	35	77	—	2	26	2	3	7	12	MC: Gold; RIAA: Gold	Get Rollin'
"Those Days"	2022	— (Note: "Those Days" did not register on the Canadian Hot 100, but peaked at number 50 on the Canadian Digital Song Sales component chart.)	—	—	23	23	—	—	—	7	14		Get Rollin'
"Unredeemable" (redeemable version)	2022	—	—	—	—	—	—	—	—	—	—		Non-album single
"Skinny Little Missy"	2023	—	—	—	—	20	—	16	—	—	—		Get Rollin'
"The Church on Cumberland Road" (with Shenandoah)	2025	—	—	—	—	—	—	—	—	—	—		Non-album single
"Nightmare Tripping" (Don Broco featuring Nickelback)	2026	—	—	—	—	—	—	—	24	—	—		Nightmare Tripping
"Bones for the Crows"	2026	— (Note: "Bones for the Crows" did not register on the Canadian Hot 100, but peaked at number 2 on the Canadian Digital Song Sales component chart.)	1	20	—	—	44	1	2	1	1		Everything Under the Sun
"Rattle the Cage" (featuring John 5)	2026	— (Note: "Rattle the Cage" did not register on the Canadian Hot 100, but peaked at number 13 on the Canadian Digital Song Sales component chart.)	17	— (Note: "Rattle the Cage" did not enter the UK Singles Chart, but peaked at number 98 on the UK Singles Downloads Chart.)	—	1	—	—	3	—	—		Everything Under the Sun
"Make Me Love You"	2026	— (Note: "Make Me Love You" did not register on the Canadian Hot 100, but peaked at number 7 on the Canadian Digital Song Sales component chart.)	28	27	25	—	49	—	2	—	—		Everything Under the Sun
"If I Don't Go"	2026	—	24	—	—	—	—	—	4	—	—		Everything Under the Sun
"—" denotes a release that did not chart or was not issued in that region.

== Promotional singles ==
List of singles as lead artist, showing year released and album name
Title	Year	Peak chart positions								Album
Title	Year	CAN Digi.	NZ Hot	US Rock	US Alt. Digi.	US Rock Digi.	US Hard Digi.	US Hard Rock	US Heri. Rock	Album
"Worthy to Say"	2000	—	—	—	—	—	—	—	—	The State
"Saturday Night's Alright (For Fighting)" (featuring Kid Rock)	2003	—	—	—	—	—	—	—	31	Charlie's Angels: Full Throttle
"Next Contestant"	2005	—	—	—	—	—	—	—	—	All the Right Reasons
"Just to Get High"	2008	—	—	—	—	—	—	—	—	Dark Horse
"Song on Fire"	2017	—	—	39	21	22	2	—	—	Feed the Machine
"After the Rain"	2017	—	—	43	19	20	—	—	—	Feed the Machine
"High Time"	2022	26	—	—	—	—	—	—	—	Get Rollin'
"Leave Me Behind"	2026	15	39	—	—	—	—	2	—	Everything Under the Sun
"—" denotes a release that did not chart or was not issued in that region.

== Other charted and certified songs ==
List of other songs, with selected chart positions, showing year released and album name
Title	Year	Peak chart positions							Certifications	Album
Title	Year	CAN Digi.	UK Rock	US Alt. Digi.	US Bubb.	US Hard Digi.	US New Digi.	US Rock Digi.	Certifications	Album
"Someone That You're With"	2007	—	—	—	7	—	—	—		All the Right Reasons
"S.E.X."	2008	—	—	—	—	—	—	—	MC: Platinum	Dark Horse
"Flat on the Floor"	2010	—	—	—	—	—	21	—		The Long Road
"Don't Ever Let It End"	2011	72	24	—	—	—	—	42		Here and Now
"Everything I Wanna Do"	2011	—	—	—	—	18	—	—		Here and Now
"Gotta Get Me Some"	2011	—	—	—	—	3	—	31		Here and Now
"Holding On to Heaven"	2011	—	40	—	—	—	—	47		Here and Now
"Miss You"	2015	—	39	11	—	—	—	12		No Fixed Address
"Make Me Believe Again"	2015	—	—	12	—	37	—	—		No Fixed Address
"Home"	2017	—	—	—	—	14	—	—		Feed the Machine
"Every Time We're Together"	2017	—	—	—	—	15	—	—		Feed the Machine
"Does Heaven Even Know You're Missing?"	2022	38	—	22	—	—	—	—		Get Rollin'
"Standing In the Dark"	2022	—	—	—	—	20	—	—		Get Rollin'
"—" denotes a release that did not chart or was not issued in that region.

== Videos ==
=== Video albums ===
List of video albums, with selected chart positions, sales figures and certifications
Title	Album details	Peak positions			Certifications
Title	Album details	AUS	UK	US	Certifications
Live at Home	Released: October 29, 2002; Label: Roadrunner; Formats: DVD, VHS	12	6	8	MC: 2× Platinum; RIAA: Gold
The Videos	Released: September 23, 2003; Label: Roadrunner; Format: DVD	—	—	11	MC: Platinum; RIAA: Platinum
The Ultimate Video Collection	Released: November 23, 2007; Label: Roadrunner; Format: DVD	27	1	12	MC: Platinum; ARIA: Gold; BPI: Gold; RIAA: Platinum
Live at Sturgis 2006	Released: December 1, 2008; Labels: Coming Home, SPV; Format: DVD, Blu-ray	17	23	2	ARIA: Gold; RIAA: Gold
"—" denotes a release that did not chart or was not issued in that region.

=== Music videos ===
List of music videos, showing year released and director(s) names
Title	Year	Director(s)	Ref.
"Fly"	1996	Andrew Duncan	
"Leader of Men" (first version)	2000	Ulf Buddensieck	
"Leader of Men" (second version)	2000	Stephen Lewis	
"Old Enough"	2000	Unknown	
"Worthy to Say"	2000	Ulf Buddensieck	
"How You Remind Me"	2001	Brothers Strause	
"Too Bad"	2002	Nigel Dick	
"Never Again"	2002	Nigel Dick	
"Someday"	2003	Nigel Dick	
"Figured You Out"	2004	Uwe Flade	
"Feelin' Way Too Damn Good"	2004	Martin Weisz	
"See You at the Show"	2004	Nicholas Wrathall	
"Photograph"	2005	Nigel Dick	
"Savin' Me"	2006	Nigel Dick	
"Far Away"	2006	Nigel Dick	
"If Everyone Cared"	2007	Dori Oskowitz	
"Rockstar"	2007	Dori Oskowitz	
"Gotta Be Somebody"	2008	Nigel Dick	
"I'd Come for You"	2009	Nigel Dick	
"If Today Was Your Last Day"	2009	Nigel Dick	
"Burn It to the Ground"	2009	Nigel Dick	
"Never Gonna Be Alone"	2009	Nigel Dick	
"This Afternoon"	2010	Nigel Dick	
"When We Stand Together"	2011	Justin Francis	
"Lullaby"	2012	Nigel Dick	
"This Means War"	2012	Peter Smith	
"Trying Not to Love You"	2012	Bill Fishman	
"Edge of a Revolution"	2014	Wayne Isham	
"She Keeps Me Up"	2015	Nigel Dick	
"Get 'Em Up"	2015	Nigel Dick	
"Satellite"	2015	Nigel Dick	
"Feed the Machine"	2017	Kyle Cogan	
"Song on Fire"	2017	Nigel Dick	
"The Betrayal (Act III)"	2017	Unknown	
"The Devil Went Down to Georgia"	2020	Aaron Eisenberg	
"San Quentin"	2022	Bill Fishman and Doug Dearth	
"Those Days"	2022	Nigel Dick	
"Unredeemable" (Redeemable Version)	2022	Nick Mahar	
"High Time"	2023	Timothy Hiehle	
"Horizon"	2024	Andy Brown	
"Tidal Wave"	2025	Timothy Hiehle	
"The Church on Cumberland Road"	2025	Amber Owen and Cole Johnstone	
"Nightmare Tripping"	2026	Gordy De St. Jeor	
"Rattle the Cage"	2026	Timothy Hiehle	
"Leave Me Behind"	2026	Timothy Hiehle	
"Make Me Love You"	2026	Nigel Dick	

== Other appearances ==
List of other appearances, showing year released and album name
Title	Year	Album	Ref.
"Legs"	2011	ZZ Top: A Tribute from Friends	
