= List of awards and nominations received by Nickelback =

Nickelback awards and nominations
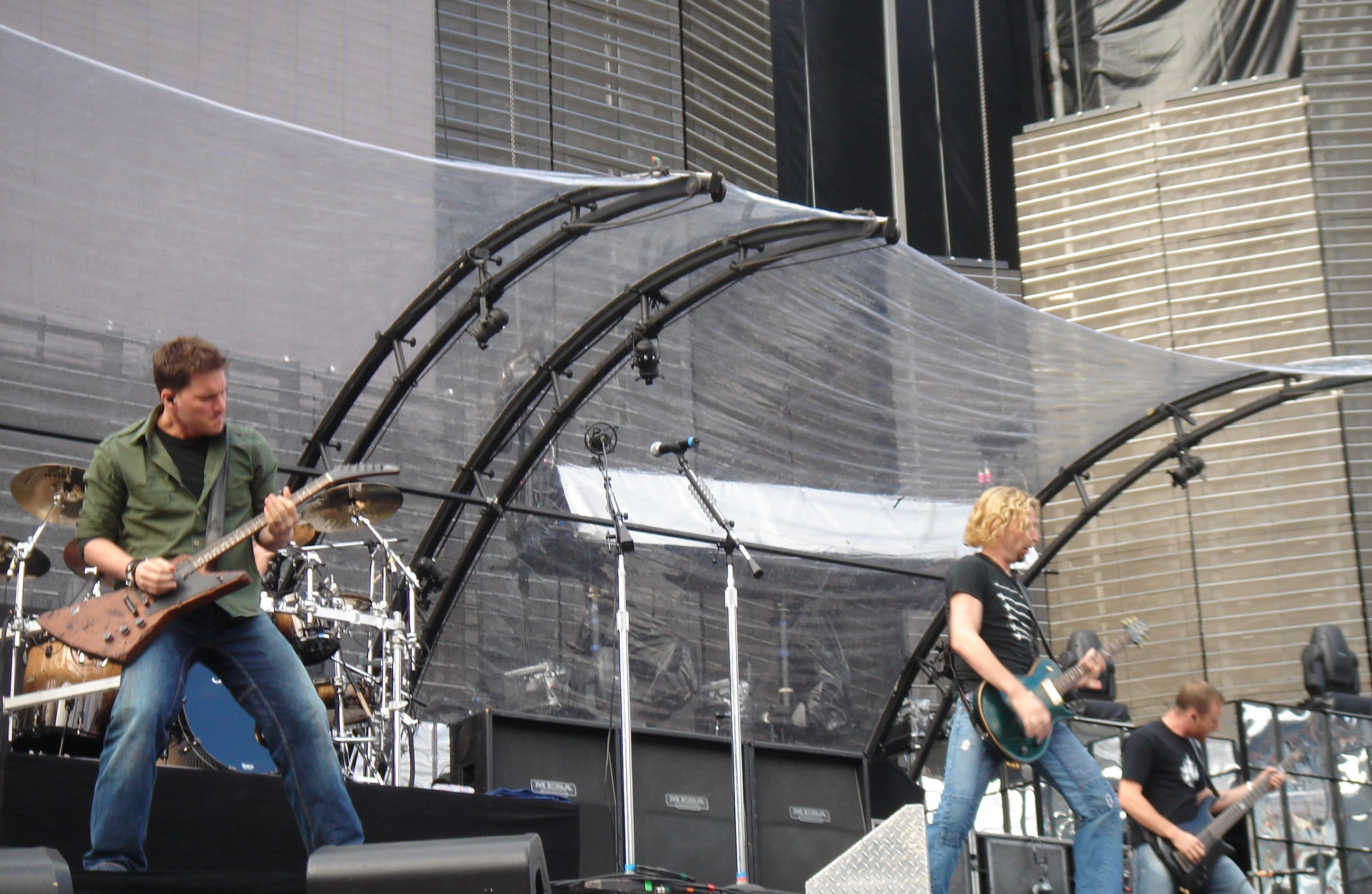
- Nickelback performing in 2006
Awards and nominations
Award	Wins	Nominations
American Music Awards	2	7
Billboard	6	11
Grammy	0	6
Juno	12	29
Much	7	15
People's Choice Awards	1	1

Totals (Note: Certain award groups do not simply award one winner. They acknowledge several different recipients, have runners-up, and have third place. Since this is a specific recognition and is different from losing an award, runner-up mentions are considered wins in this award tally. For simplification and to avoid errors, each award in this list has been presumed to have had a prior nomination.)
- Wins: 70
- Nominations: 143

Nickelback is a Canadian rock band formed in Hanna, Alberta by Chad Kroeger, Mike Kroeger, Ryan Peake, and then-drummer Brandon Kroeger (who has since been replaced by Daniel Adair). The band has released eleven studio albums: Curb (1996), The State (2000), Silver Side Up (2001), The Long Road (2003), All the Right Reasons (2005), Dark Horse (2008), Here and Now (2011), No Fixed Address (2014), Feed the Machine (2017), Get Rollin' (2022) and Everything Under the Sun (2026). Along with this, Nickelback also published two other albums which were a collection of their most well-known songs so far: Three-Sided Coin (2002) and The Best of Nickelback Volume 1 (2013). "How You Remind Me", the first single from the band's third album Silver Side Up, is Nickelback's highest-charting single; it peaked at #1 on Billboard's Hot 100, Hot Mainstream Rock Tracks, Hot Modern Rock Tracks, and Canadian Hot 100 music charts. The band's fifth studio album, All the Right Reasons, has been their highest-selling album, with over 11 million copies sold worldwide as of late 2007.

Nickelback has been recognized by several Canadian awards ceremonies; the band has received twelve awards from twenty-eight nominations at the Juno Awards and seven awards from fifteen nominations at the MuchMusic Video Awards. Nickelback has also received two awards from six nominations at the American Music Awards and three awards from five nominations at the Billboard Music Awards. The band has received six nominations from the Grammy Awards but has not won any of them. In 2006, Nickelback receive an award at the World Music Awards for World's Best Selling Rock Artist, beating some well-known artists like Green Day, Red Hot Chili Peppers and Coldplay. The group was inducted into Canada's Walk of Fame in 2007. In the same year received an award for People's Choice Awards for the category Favorite Group. Overall, Nickelback has received 32 awards from 78 nominations.

== American Music Awards ==
The American Music Awards are awarded for outstanding achievements in the record industry. Nickelback has received two awards from seven nominations.

Year	Nominee / work	Award	Result
2003	Nickelback	Favorite Pop/Rock Band/Duo/Group	Nominated
2004	Nickelback	Favorite Pop/Rock Band/Duo/Group	Nominated
2006	Nickelback	Favorite Pop/Rock Band/Duo/Group	Nominated
2006	Nickelback	Favorite Alternative Artist	Nominated
2006	All the Right Reasons	Favorite Pop/Rock Album	Won
2007	Nickelback	Favorite Pop/Rock Band/Duo/Group	Won
2009	Nickelback	Favorite Pop/Rock Band/Duo/Group	Nominated

== BDS Spin Awards ==
The Broadcast Data Systems, better known as BDS, is a service that tracks monitored radio, television and internet airplay of songs based on the number of spins and detections. Nickelback has received fourteen BDS Spin awards.

Year	Nominee / work	Award	Result
2004	"How You Remind Me"	900,000 Spins	Won
2004	"Someday"	500,000 Spins	Won
2004	"Never Again"	100,000 Spins	Won
2004	"Feelin' Way Too Damn Good"	100,000 Spins	Won
2004	"Figured You Out"	100,000 Spins	Won
2006	"Too Bad"	300,000 Spins	Won
2007	"Animals"	100,000 Spins	Won
2007	"Savin' Me"	300,000 Spins	Won
2007	"Far Away"	400,000 Spins	Won
2007	"If Everyone Cared"	200,000 Spins	Won
2007	"Photograph"	500,000 Spins	Won
2009	"If Today Was Your Last Day"	200,000 Spins	Won
2010	"Rockstar"	500,000 Spins	Won
2012	"We Stand Together"	50,000 Spins	Won

== Billboard Music Awards ==
The Billboard Music Awards are sponsored by Billboard magazine and is held annually in December. Nickelback has won seven awards from eleven nominations.

Year	Nominee / work	Award	Result
2002	How You Remind Me	Hot 100 Single of the Year	Won
2002	How You Remind Me	Hot 100 Airplay Single of the Year	Won
2002	How You Remind Me	Hot 100 Single of the Year by Duo/Group	Won
2002	How You Remind Me	Top 40 Rock Track of the Year	Won
2006	Nickelback	Artist of the Year	Nominated
2006	Nickelback	Duo/Group of the Year	Won
2006	Nickelback	Hot 100 Artist Duo/Group of the Year	Won
2006	Nickelback	Rock Artist of the Year	Nominated
2006	All the Right Reasons	Rock Album of the Year	Won
2006	All the Right Reasons	Album of the Year	Nominated
2012	Here and Now	Top Rock Album	Nominated
2012	Here and Now	Top Alternative Album	Nominated

== BMI Pop Awards ==
Nickelback has earned fifteen BMI Pop Awards.

Year	Nominee / work	Award	Result
2003	"Too Bad"	Best Pop	Won
2003	"How You Remind Me"	Song of the Year	Won
2005	"Someday"	Most Performed Song on College Radio	Won
2005	"Someday"	Best Pop	Won
2005	"Figured You Out"	Best Pop	Won
2006	"Feelin' Way Too Damn Good"	Best Pop	Won
2007	"Photograph"	Best Pop	Won
2007	"Savin' Me"	Best Pop	Won
2008	"Far Away"	Best Pop	Won
2008	"If Everyone Cared"	Best Pop	Won
2008	"Rockstar"	Best Pop	Won
2010	"Gotta Be Somebody"	Best Pop	Won
2010	"If Today Was Your Last Day"	Best Pop	Won
2011	"Never Gonna Be Alone"	Best Pop	Won
2011	"This Afternoon"	Best Pop	Won

== Brit Awards ==
The Brit Awards are the British Phonographic Industry's annual pop music awards.

Year	Nominee / work	Award	Result
2003	Nickelback	International Group	Nominated
2003	Nickelback	International Breakthrough Artist	Nominated

== Canada Walk of Fame ==
Year	Nominee / work	Award	Result
2007	Musicians	Walk of Fame	Inducted

== Canadian Radio Music Awards ==
Year	Nominee / work	Award	Result
2003	Nickelback	Chart Toppers	Won

== Grammy Awards ==
The Grammy Awards are awarded annually by the National Academy of Recording Arts and Sciences. Nickelback has received six nominations.

Year	Nominee / work	Award	Result
2003	"How You Remind Me"	Record of the Year	Nominated
2004	"Someday"	Best Rock Song	Nominated
2004	The Long Road	Best Rock Album	Nominated
2005	"Feelin' Way Too Damn Good"	Best Hard Rock Performance	Nominated
2008	"If Everyone Cared"	Best Rock Performance by a Duo or Group with Vocal	Nominated
2010	"Burn It to the Ground"	Best Hard Rock Performance	Nominated

== Juno Awards ==
The Juno Awards are presented by the Canadian Academy of Recording Arts and Sciences. Nickelback has received twelve awards from thirty-three nominations.

Year	Nominee / work	Award	Result
2001	Nickelback	Best New Group	Won
2002	Silver Side Up	Album of the Year	Nominated
2002	Silver Side Up	Rock Album of the Year	Won
2002	"How You Remind Me"	Single of the Year	Won
2002	Nickelback	Group of the Year	Won
2003	"Hero", "How You Remind Me" and "Too Bad"	Songwriter of the Year	Won
2003	Nickelback	Juno Fan Choice Award	Nominated
2004	The Long Road	Album of the Year	Nominated
2004	The Long Road	Rock Album of the Year	Nominated
2004	Nickelback	Group of the Year	Won
2004	Nickelback	Juno Fan Choice Award	Won
2004	"Someday"	Single of the Year	Nominated
2005	Nickelback	Jack Richardson Producer of the Year	Nominated
2006	All the Right Reasons	Album of the Year	Nominated
2006	All the Right Reasons	Rock Album of the Year	Won
2006	Nickelback	Group of the Year	Won
2006	Nickelback	Jack Richardson Producer of the Year	Nominated
2006	Nickelback	Juno Fan Choice Award	Nominated
2006	"Photograph"	Single of the Year	Nominated
2007	Nickelback	Juno Fan Choice Award	Nominated
2007	"Far Away", "If Everyone Cared" and "Rockstar"	Songwriter of the Year	Nominated
2009	Nickelback	Group of the Year	Won
2009	Nickelback	Jack Richardson Producer of the Year	Nominated
2009	Nickelback	Juno Fan Choice Award	Won
2009	"Gotta Be Somebody"	Single of the Year	Nominated
2009	"Dark Horse"	Album of the Year	Won
2010	"Dark Horse"	Rock Album of the Year	Nominated
2010	Nickelback	Juno Fan Choice Award	Nominated
2012	Nickelback	Juno Fan Choice	Nominated
2012	Nickelback	Group of the Year	Nominated
2012	"Here and Now"	Album of the Year	Nominated
2012	"When We Stand Together"	Single of the Year	Nominated
2013	Nickelback	Juno Fan Choice	Nominated
2016	No Fixed Address	Rock Album of the Year	Nominated
2023	Nickelback	Canadian Music Hall of Fame	Won
2023	"Get Rollin'"	Rock Album of the Year	Nominated

== Kerrang! Awards ==
The Kerrang! Awards is an annual awards ceremony held by Kerrang!, a British rock magazine. Nickelback received one nomination.

Year	Nominee / work	Award	Result
2002	"How You Remind Me"	Best Single	Nominated

== MuchMusic Video Awards ==
The MuchMusic Video Awards is an annual awards ceremony presented by the Canadian music video channel MuchMusic. Nickelback received seven awards from sixteen nominations.

Year	Nominee / work	Award	Result
2000	"Leader Of Men"	MuchLoud Best Rock Video	Nominated
2002	"Too Bad"	Best Video	Won
2002	"Too Bad"	MuchLoud Best Rock Video	Won
2002	"Too Bad"	Best Cinematography	Nominated
2002	"Too Bad"	Best Post Production	Nominated
2002	"How You Remind Me"	People's Choice: Favourite Canadian Group	Nominated
2002	"How You Remind Me"	Best Video	Nominated
2002	"How You Remind Me"	MuchLOUD Best Rock Video	Nominated
2006	"Photograph"	MuchLoud Best Rock Video	Won
2007	"If Everyone Cared"	Best Video	Nominated
2007	"If Everyone Cared"	MuchLoud Best Rock Video	Nominated
2007	"Far Away"	MuchMoreMusic Award	Won
2007	"Far Away"	Best International Video by a Canadian	Nominated
2007	"Far Away"	People's Choice: Favourite Canadian Group	Nominated
2009	"Gotta Be Somebody"	Video of the Year	Won
2009	"Gotta Be Somebody"	Best Post-Production of the Year	Won
2009	"Gotta Be Somebody"	MuchLOUD Rock Video of the Year	Won
2009	"Gotta Be Somebody"	UR Fave: Canadian Video	Nominated
2009	"If Today Was Your Last Day"	International Video of the Year by a Canadian	Nominated
2010	"I'd Come for You"	Video of the Year	Nominated
2010	"I'd Come for You"	MuchLOUD Rock Video of the Year	Nominated
2012	"When We Stand Together"	International Video of the Year by a Canadian	Nominated
2012	"When We Stand Together"	Most Streamed Video of the Year	Nominated
2015	"Edge of a Revolution"	Best Rock/Alternative Video	Nominated
2015	"Edge of a Revolution"	Fan Fave Video	Nominated

== MTV Video Music Awards ==
The MTV Video Music Awards is an annual awards ceremony presented by the American music video channel MTV. In 2002 Chad Kroeger (Nickelback) has won Best Video from a Film with Josey Scott (Saliva) for Spider-Man theme song, "Hero".

Year	Nominee / work	Award	Result
2002	"Hero"	Best Video from a Film	Won
2002	"Too Bad"	International Viewer's Choice Award for MTV Canada	Won

== MTV Video Europe Music Awards ==
The MTV Europe Music Awards is an annual awards ceremony created by MTV. Nickelback received two nominations.

Year	Nominee / work	Award	Result
2002	Nickelback	Best Rock	Nominated
2002	"How You Remind Me"	Best Song	Nominated

== Nickelodeon Kids Choice Awards ==
The Kids Choice Awards is an annual awards ceremony created by Nickelodeon. Nickelback received one nomination.

Year	Nominee / work	Award	Result
2007	Nickelback	Favorite Music Group	Nominated

== People's Choice Awards ==
The People's Choice Awards is an awards show recognizing the people and the work of popular culture. Nickelback has received one award, from 2 nomination.

Year	Nominee / work	Award	Result
2007	Nickelback	Favorite Group	Won
2011	Nickelback	Favorite Rock Band	Nominated

== Q Awards ==
The Q Award is a United Kingdom's annual music awards run by the music magazine Q to honor musical excellence. Winners are voted by readers of Q online, with others decided by a judging panel.

Year	Nominee / work	Award	Result
2002	"How You Remind Me"	Best Single	Nominated

== Radio Music Awards ==
The Radio Music Awards is an annual awards ceremony to honor the most played songs/artists on the radio.

Year	Nominee / work	Award	Result
2004	Nickelback	Rock Artist of the Year	Nominated
2004	Nickelback	Cingular Artist of the Year	Nominated
2004	"Someday"	Song of the Year/Modern Adult Contemporary Radio	Nominated
2004	"Someday"	Song of the Year/Top 40 Radio	Nominated
2004	"Figured You Out"	Song of the Year/Rock Radio	Nominated
2004	"Figured You Out"	Song of the Year / Rock Alternative Radio	Nominated

== Record of the Year Award ==
The Record of the Year is an award voted by the UK public. "Rockstar" is the first winner which did not make # 1 on the UK singles chart, and also the first by a non-UK or Irish artist.

Year	Nominee / work	Award	Result
2008	Rockstar	Record of the Year	Won

== Socan Awards ==
The Society of Composers, Authors and Music Publishers of Canada (SOCAN) is a Canadian performance rights organization that represents the performing rights of more than 175,000 songwriters, composers and music publishers.

Year	Nominee / work	Award	Result
2004	Nickelback	Best Artist	Won
2005	Nickelback	Best Artist	Won
2007	Nickelback	Best Artist	Won
2007	"Savin' Me"	Best Song	Won

== World Music Awards ==
The World Music Awards is an international awards show founded in 1989 that annually honors recording artists based on worldwide sales figures provided by the International Federation of the Phonographic Industry (IFPI). John Martinotti is an executive producer and co-founder of the show. The awards show is conducted under the patronage of H.S.H. Prince Albert of Monaco, Monte-Carlo.

Year	Nominee / work	Award	Result
2006	Nickelback	World's Best Rock Group	Won
2007	Nickelback	World's Best Selling Rock Group	Nominated
2012	Nickelback	World's Best Group	Nominated
