= The Best of Nickelback Volume 1 =

Greatest hits album by Nickelback
- Released: November 19, 2013
- Recorded: 2001–2011
- Length: 73:18
- Labels: Roadrunner; Universal Music Canada
- Producer: Chad Kroeger

Nickelback chronology
Here and Now (2011)	The Best of Nickelback Volume 1 (2013)	No Fixed Address (2014)

The Best of Nickelback Volume 1 is a compilation album by Canadian rock band Nickelback. It was released on November 4, 2013, through Roadrunner Records (internationally) and Universal Music Canada (in Canada) to coincide with their October–November 2013 "The Hits Tour". Though frontman Chad Kroeger had previously stated in an interview that their upcoming greatest hits album would include new songs as well as previous hits, the final track listing contains only previously released material. The compilation features singles released from all but the first two studio albums (1996's Curb and 1998's The State) from the band; Silver Side Up (2001), The Long Road (2003), All the Right Reasons (2005), Dark Horse (2008), and Here and Now (2011).

== Reception ==
Professional ratings
Review scores
Source	Rating
AllMusic	3.5/5 stars
The Irish Times	2/5 stars

In a mixed review, AllMusic's Stephen Thomas Erlewine said the track listing ignored the band's first two albums, Curb and The State, and that its inclusion of only two songs from the band's then-most recent studio album, Here and Now, "accurately reflects [that album's] also-ran status". He said that the greatest hits compilation would not change the minds of "the band's haters – who are legion" but that "there's not a more listenable Nickelback album out there".

In a negative review, Tony Clayton-Lea writing for The Irish Times lamented how "even the least discerning fan will listen to most of what's here and give it short shrift", nominating "How You Remind Me" and "Rockstar" as the best tracks on the package amidst the lifetime supply of "turgid cheese" present on the compilation.

== Track listing ==
All lyrics written by Chad Kroeger and all music composed by Nickelback, except where noted.

The Best of Nickelback Volume 1 track listing
No.	Title	Original release (year)	Length
1.	"Photograph"	All the Right Reasons (2005)	4:19
2.	"How You Remind Me"	Silver Side Up (2001)	3:43
3.	"Burn It to the Ground"	Dark Horse (2008)	3:28
4.	"Rockstar"	All the Right Reasons (2005)	4:14
5.	"Savin' Me"	All the Right Reasons (2005)	3:39
6.	"Figured You Out"	The Long Road (2003)	3:48
7.	"Too Bad"	Silver Side Up (2001)	3:52
8.	"If Today Was Your Last Day"	Dark Horse (2008)	4:07
9.	"Far Away"	All the Right Reasons (2005)	3:58
10.	"Feelin' Way Too Damn Good"	The Long Road (2003)	4:16
11.	"Someday" (co-written with Ryan Peake and Mike Kroeger)	The Long Road (2003)	3:27
12.	"Never Again"	Silver Side Up (2001)	4:20
13.	"Lullaby" (music composed solely by Chad Kroeger)	Here and Now (2011)	3:48
14.	"If Everyone Cared"	All the Right Reasons (2005)	3:38
15.	"Gotta Be Somebody"	Dark Horse (2008)	4:13
16.	"When We Stand Together" (additional composition/production by Joey Moi)	Here and Now (2011)	3:10
17.	"Animals"	All the Right Reasons (2005)	3:06
18.	"This Afternoon" (additional composition/production by Robert John "Mutt" Lange)	Dark Horse (2008)	4:34
19.	"Something In Your Mouth" (additional composition/production by Robert John "Mutt" Lange)	Dark Horse (2008)	3:38
Total length:			73:18

- Tracks 2, 7, and 12 from Silver Side Up (2001)
- Tracks 6 and 10–11 from The Long Road (2003)
- Tracks 1, 4–5, 9, 14, and 17 from All the Right Reasons (2005)
- Tracks 3, 8, 15, and 18–19 from Dark Horse (2008)
- Tracks 13 and 16 from Here and Now (2011)

== Charts ==
=== Weekly charts ===
Weekly chart performance for The Best of Nickelback Volume 1
Chart (2013)	Peak position
Australian Albums (ARIA)	6
Austrian Albums (Ö3 Austria)	13
Belgian Albums (Ultratop Flanders)	40
Belgian Albums (Ultratop Wallonia)	93
Canadian Albums (Billboard)	16
Danish Albums (Hitlisten)	11
German Albums (Offizielle Top 100)	31
Dutch Albums (Album Top 100)	45
Finnish Albums (Suomen virallinen lista)	16
Hungarian Albums (MAHASZ)	1
Irish Albums (IRMA)	43
Italian Albums (FIMI)	46
Japanese Albums (Oricon)	19
New Zealand Albums (RMNZ)	7
Norwegian Albums (VG-lista)	16
Scottish Albums (Official Charts)	14
South African Albums (RISA)	16
Swedish Albums (Sverigetopplistan)	28
Swiss Albums (Schweizer Hitparade)	10
UK Albums (Official Charts)	15
UK Rock & Metal Albums (Official Charts)	1
US Billboard 200	21
US Top Alternative Albums (Billboard)	4
US Top Hard Rock Albums (Billboard)	1
US Top Rock Albums (Billboard)	7

2024 weekly chart performance for The Best of Nickelback Volume 1
Chart (2024)	Peak position
Canadian Albums (Billboard)	11

=== Year-end charts ===
Year-end chart performance for The Best of Nickelback Volume 1
Chart (2013)	Position
Hungarian Albums (MAHASZ)	33
Chart (2014)	Position
Australian Albums (ARIA)	98
US Billboard 200	151
US Alternative Albums (Billboard)	23
US Top Hard Rock Albums (Billboard)	6
US Top Rock Albums (Billboard)	30
Chart (2017)	Position
US Top Rock Albums (Billboard)	93
Chart (2021)	Position
US Billboard 200	172
US Top Rock Albums (Billboard)	35
Chart (2022)	Position
US Billboard 200	119
US Top Rock Albums (Billboard)	14
Chart (2023)	Position
US Billboard 200	114
US Top Rock Albums (Billboard)	16
Chart (2024)	Position
US Billboard 200	75
Chart (2025)	Position
US Billboard 200	63

== Certifications ==
Certifications for The Best of Nickelback Volume 1
Region	Certification	Certified units/sales
Australia (ARIA)	Platinum	70,000^{^}
Denmark (IFPI Danmark)	Gold	10,000^{‡}
Hungary (MAHASZ)	Gold	1,000^{^}
New Zealand (RMNZ)	2× Platinum	30,000^{‡}
United Kingdom (BPI)	2× Platinum	600,000^{‡}
United States (RIAA)	Gold	500,000^{‡}
^{^} Shipments figures based on certification alone.^{‡} Sales+streaming figures based on certification alone.
