= Trying Not to Love You =

Single by Nickelback

from the album Here and Now
- Released: August 20, 2012
- Recorded: 2011
- Studio: Mountain View (Abbotsford, British Columbia)
- Genre: Alternative rock; pop rock; post-grunge; soft rock
- Length: 4:11 (album version); 3:45 (radio edit)
- Label: Roadrunner
- Songwriters: Chad Kroeger; Ryan Peake; Brett Warren; Brad Warren
- Producers: Nickelback; Joey Moi

Nickelback singles chronology
"Lullaby" (2012)	"Trying Not to Love You" (2012)	"Edge of a Revolution" (2014)

Music video
- "Trying Not to Love You" on YouTube

"Trying Not to Love You" is a song by Canadian rock band Nickelback. It was released in August 2012 as the fifth and final single from their seventh studio album, Here and Now.

== Music video ==
The music video was released on August 17, 2012. It features actor Jason Alexander and fashion model Brooke Burns. Alexander plays Bud, a genial heavyset barista who serves coffee with latte art and makes the latte order of a beautiful customer played by Burns, Gennifer. Having fallen for Gennifer at first sight, he fantasizes a series of images of her in which she smiles at him clad in bikini as he gazes at her; in reality, she is just as appreciative of his skills and personality, smiling at Bud when he gets clumsy as he prepares her coffee. Bud's dressed-up doppelgänger suddenly appears in his motorcycle and woos Gennifer, resulting in the two competing for her affection by making the best latte art. The doppelgänger's vivid works gain the most attention not only from Gennifer but also the customers and Bud's manager alike and he is hired on the spot. Defeated, Bud leaves, but is stopped by Gennifer to show him her fondness for one of his latte arts (on which their initials are enclosed in hearts) before drinking it. Having gained Gennifer's respect and admiration, Bud leaves the café with her on his motorcycle with a smile on his face, to the chagrin of his rival.

== Track listing ==
- "Trying Not to Love You" (album version)
- "Trying Not to Love You" (radio edit)

== Charts ==
=== Weekly charts ===
Weekly chart performance for "Trying Not to Love You"
Chart (2011–2012)	Peak position
Australia (ARIA)	66
Austria (Ö3 Austria Top 40)	67
Belgium (Ultratip Bubbling Under Flanders)	9
Canada Hot 100 (Billboard)	93
Netherlands (Dutch Top 40 Tipparade)	7
Netherlands (Single Top 100)	98
Poland Airplay (ZPAV)	4
US Bubbling Under Hot 100 Singles (Billboard)	4

=== Year-end charts ===
Year-end chart performance for "Trying Not to Love You"
Chart (2013)	Position
Ukraine Airplay (TopHit)	134

== Personnel ==
- Chad Kroeger – lead vocals, guitars
- Mike Kroeger – bass
- Daniel Adair – drums, backing vocals
- Ryan Peake – guitars, backing vocals
