= Lullaby (Nickelback song) =

Single by Nickelback

from the album Here and Now
- Released: February 24, 2012
- Recorded: 2011 Mountain View Studios, Vancouver, British Columbia, Canada
- Genre: Alternative rock; pop rock
- Length: 3:48 (album version); 3:39 (radio edit)
- Label: Roadrunner
- Songwriters: Chad Kroeger, Craig Wiseman, Chris Tompkins, Rodney Clawson
- Producers: Nickelback, Joey Moi, Brian Howes

Nickelback singles chronology
"This Means War" (2012)	"Lullaby" (2012)	"Trying Not to Love You" (2012)

Music video
- "Lullaby" on YouTube

"Lullaby" is a song by Canadian rock band Nickelback. It was released in February 2012 as the fourth single from their seventh studio album, Here and Now.

== Music video ==
The music video for "Lullaby", directed by Nigel Dick, was shot in a factory in California on January 28, 2012. It premiered on March 22 on VH1.

The video features a constructed narrative interspersed with shots of the band performing in a cavernous building. It also returns to the emotionally wrenching stories the band had previously used in music videos for songs such as "Too Bad", "Someday", "Never Gonna Be Alone" and "Far Away". In the story a pregnant woman is rushed down a hospital corridor, ready to give birth. The baby is soon delivered, but the new mother dies moments later. Now left to raise his child alone, the father (played by Justin James Hughes) struggles to keep his life together. One day as he settles the child down, his phone slips from his pocket, and he finds a video of his wife that was shot while she was heavily pregnant. After showing it to the child, he feels confident enough to raise the child alone, and crumples up the adoption pamphlet he'd picked up before leaving the hospital.

A performance-only version of the video was also distributed amongst other channels, such as Kerrang! TV in the United Kingdom, that remove the narrative altogether.

== Track listing ==
CD Single (RR 3618-2)

1. "Lullaby" 3:48
2. "If Today Was Your Last Day" 4:08

Promo CD Single (PRO16951)

1. "Lullaby" (Pop Mix Edit) 3:28
2. "Lullaby" (Pop Mix) 3:38
3. "Lullaby" (Album Version) 3:48

== Charts ==
=== Weekly charts ===
Chart (2011–12)	Peak position
Australia (ARIA)	58
Austria (Ö3 Austria Top 40)	27
Belgium (Ultratip Bubbling Under Flanders)	3
Canada Hot 100 (Billboard)	52
Canada AC (Billboard)	28
Canada CHR/Top 40 (Billboard)	42
Canada Hot AC (Billboard)	12
Germany (GfK)	36
Netherlands (Dutch Top 40 Tipparade)	5
Poland Airplay (ZPAV)	1
Slovakia Airplay (ČNS IFPI)	99
Switzerland (Schweizer Hitparade)	45
UK Singles (The Official Charts Company)	194
UK Rock & Metal (OCC)	3
US Billboard Hot 100	89
US Adult Pop Airplay (Billboard)	15

=== Year-end charts ===
Chart (2012)	Position
US Adult Top 40 (Billboard)	47

== Certifications ==
Region	Certification	Certified units/sales
Australia (ARIA)	Gold	35,000^{^}
Canada (Music Canada)	Gold	40,000^{*}
New Zealand (RMNZ)	Gold	15,000^{‡}
Switzerland (IFPI Switzerland)	Gold	15,000^{^}
United Kingdom (BPI)	Silver	200,000^{‡}
^{*} Sales figures based on certification alone.^{^} Shipments figures based on certification alone.^{‡} Sales+streaming figures based on certification alone.

== Personnel ==
- Chad Kroeger – lead vocals
- Mike Kroeger – bass
- Daniel Adair – drums, backing vocals
- Ryan Peake – piano, backing vocals
- Rob Dawson - acoustic guitar
