= The State (album) =

- September 1999 re-issue cover

Studio album by Nickelback
- Released: January 11, 1999
- Recorded: January–February 1998; Burnaby, British Columbia
- Genres: Post-grunge; hard rock; alternative metal
- Length: 38:51
- Labels: self-released EMI Music Canada (first and second reissues); Roadrunner (third reissue)
- Producer: Dale Penner

Nickelback chronology
Curb (1996)	The State (1999)	Silver Side Up (2001)

Singles from The State
- 1. "Leader of Men" Released: March 4, 2000; 2. "Old Enough" Released: October 2000; 3. "Breathe" Released: November 20, 2000; 4. "Worthy to Say" Released: December 5, 2000

Alternate cover
- 2000 re-release cover

Professional ratings
Review scores
Source	Rating
AllMusic	2/5 stars
The Encyclopedia of Popular Music	2/5 stars
The Rolling Stone Album Guide	2/5 stars

The State is the second studio album by Canadian rock band Nickelback. "Leader of Men" was the lead single, followed by "Old Enough", "Breathe", and "Worthy to Say". The album held a peak position of No. 130 on the Billboard 200. It also reached a peak position of No. 3 on the Billboard Top Heatseekers Albums chart in 2000. The State was the band's first album to be certified Gold in both Canada and the United States. It later went Platinum in Canada in April 2002 and in 2008 in the US.

== Background ==
The State was recorded in early 1998, with the band investing $30,000 into the record. On January 11, 1999 The State was released independently with a blue album cover. The original release was limited to 5,000 copies. In September of the same year, it was reissued on EMI Canada, with a re-formatted version of the original cover (the words "Nickelback" and "The State" were originally in yellow, in the same size near the right edge of the cover; on the EMI reissue, the word "Nickelback" was made into a bigger font and "The State" rendered in white at the top of the cover). In 2000, it was reissued again on EMI Canada, this time with different artwork featuring a young boy in a jail cell. This was also the artwork used on the American, European, and Australian releases on Roadrunner Records. In 2000, The State reached the Billboard 200 peaking 130. To support The State, Nickelback toured with Creed, Sevendust, 3 Doors Down, and Stone Temple Pilots. In early 2001, the band played its final dates with Everclear. In March 2001, Nickelback won its first Juno Award for Best New Group.

The album had four singles: "Leader of Men", "Breathe", "Old Enough", and "Worthy to Say". "Leader of Men" and "Breathe" both charted on the top 10 Mainstream Rock Tracks.

== Track listing ==
All lyrics are written by Chad Kroeger; all music is composed by Nickelback.

No.	Title	Length
1.	"Breathe"	3:57
2.	"Cowboy Hat"	3:55
3.	"Leader of Men"	3:30
4.	"Old Enough"	2:45
5.	"Worthy to Say"	4:06
6.	"Diggin' This"	3:01
7.	"Deep"	2:48
8.	"One Last Run"	3:30
9.	"Not Leavin' Yet"	3:44
10.	"Hold Out Your Hand"	4:07
11.	"Leader of Men (Acoustic)^{1}"	3:23
Total length:		38:51

Japanese exclusive bonus track
No.	Title	Length
12.	"Little Friend^{2}"	3:49
Total length:		42:40

== Singles ==
Single information
"Leader of Men"
- Released: March 2000
- Chart position:
  - #8 (U.S. Main Rock)
  - #21 (U.S. Modern Rock)
  - #11 (CAN RPM Rock/Alternative)
"Old Enough"
- Released: October 2000
- Chart position:
  - #24 (U.S. Main Rock)
  - #12 (CAN RPM Rock/Alternative)
"Breathe"
- Released: October 2000
- Chart position:
  - #10 (U.S. Main Rock)
  - #21 (U.S. Modern Rock)
  - #16 (CAN RPM Rock/Alternative)

== Personnel ==
Credits adapted from album's liner notes.

Nickelback

- Chad Kroeger – lead vocals, guitar
- Ryan Peake – guitar, backing vocals
- Mike Kroeger – bass
- Ryan Vikedal – drums (credited)
- Mitch Guindon – drums (not credited, but performed on the album)

Production

- Dale Penner – producer, engineer
- Nickelback — producer
- Dave Ashton — second engineer
- GGGarth Richardson — mixing
- G.E. Slavin Creative Design — graphic design in Coquitlam, British Columbia
- Brett Zilahi — mastering at Metalworks in Mississauga, Ontario
- Ken Grant — executive producer

== Release history ==
Release	Date
Original	September 4, 1999
Re-release	March 7, 2000

== Charts ==
=== Weekly charts ===
Chart (2000–2001)	Peak position
German Albums (Offizielle Top 100)	57
UK Rock & Metal Albums (Official Charts)	15
US Billboard 200	130
US Independent Albums (Billboard)	6

=== Year-end charts ===
2001 year-end chart performance for The State
Chart (2001)	Position
Canadian Albums (Nielsen SoundScan)	199

2002 year-end chart performance for The State
Chart (2002)	Position
Canadian Alternative Albums (Nielsen SoundScan)	97

== Certifications ==
Region	Certification	Certified units/sales
Canada (Music Canada)	Platinum	100,000^{^}
United Kingdom (BPI)	Silver	60,000^{*}
United States (RIAA)	Platinum	1,000,000^{^}
^{*} Sales figures based on certification alone.^{^} Shipments figures based on certification alone.

== Appearances ==
- The song "Old Enough" was featured on the soundtrack to the film Book of Shadows: Blair Witch 2 in 2000.
- The songs "Diggin' This" and "Hold Out Your Hand" were featured in the film The Forsaken in 2001.
- The song "Leader of Men" was featured on the soundtrack to the movie Soul Assassin in 2001.
- The song "Breathe" was featured on the soundtrack to the movie Clockstoppers in 2002.

== Notes ==
^{1.} Incorrectly titled "Leader of Men (Accoustic)" on the back insert of the original 1998 release.

^{2.} Song from Curb (1996).
