= When We Stand Together =

Single by Nickelback

from the album Here and Now
- Released: September 26, 2011
- Recorded: 2011
- Studio: Mountain View Studios (Abbotsford, British Columbia)
- Genre: Power pop
- Length: 3:10
- Label: Roadrunner
- Songwriters: Chad Kroeger; Ryan Peake; Mike Kroeger; Joey Moi
- Producers: Nickelback; Joey Moi

Nickelback singles chronology
"This Afternoon" (2010)	"When We Stand Together" (2011)	"Bottoms Up" (2011)

Music video
- "When We Stand Together" on YouTube

"When We Stand Together" is the lead single by the Canadian rock band Nickelback from their seventh studio album, Here and Now.

== Release ==
"When We Stand Together", along with "Bottoms Up" were made free for listening on the band's official website on September 22, 2011. Both songs were released as singles on September 26 and available for download on September 27. The music video was released on November 3, 2011.

"When We Stand Together" was used for the theme song of WWE's Tribute to the Troops. The band also performed this song at the event.

Boxer Lucian Bute came out to the ring with this song before his World Title fight with Carl Froch on May 26, 2012.

A few seconds of the intro to the song were used during the Sunday Night Football game between the Baltimore Ravens and Buffalo Bills on September 7, 2025.

== Music video ==
The official video was directed by Justin Francis and made its debut on November 3, 2011, on Big Morning Buzz Live on VH1.

The video was filmed at Malibu State Park. The hill is the same hill from the television show M*A*S*H.

As of April 2026, the music video has more than 122 million views on YouTube.

== Chart performance ==
"When We Stand Together" debuted at number 48 on the Billboard Hot 100. Then, sales picked up and it peaked at number 44. Despite that, the song was a commercial success internationally, peaking at number 10 in their native Canada. It peaked at number two in Finland, becoming their biggest hit in the country, beating "How You Remind Me", which peaked at number 18 on the chart. The song also peaked in the top 10 in Poland, Germany, Switzerland, Hungary, and Austria. Overall, the song was a much bigger single than any other from the Dark Horse album.

== Track listing ==
1. "When We Stand Together"
2. "Bottoms Up"

== Personnel ==
- Chad Kroeger – lead vocals, acoustic guitar
- Mike Kroeger – bass guitar, backing vocals
- Daniel Adair – drums, backing vocals
- Ryan Peake – acoustic guitar, backing vocals

== Charts ==
=== Weekly charts ===
Chart (2011–2012)	Peak position
Australia (ARIA)	20
Austria (Ö3 Austria Top 40)	8
Belgium (Ultratip Bubbling Under Flanders)	34
Canada Hot 100 (Billboard)	10
Canada AC (Billboard)	10
Canada CHR/Top 40 (Billboard)	32
Canada Hot AC (Billboard)	7
Canada Rock (Billboard)	50
Czech Republic Airplay (ČNS IFPI)	48
Denmark (Tracklisten)	24
Finland (Suomen virallinen lista)	2
Germany (GfK)	6
Hungary (Rádiós Top 40)	7
Japan Hot 100 (Billboard)	16
Netherlands (Dutch Top 40)	12
Netherlands (Single Top 100)	33
Norway (VG-lista)	11
Poland Airplay (ZPAV)	5
Russia Airplay (TopHit)	11
Scottish Singles Sales (Official Charts)	31
Slovakia Airplay (ČNS IFPI)	18
Sweden (Sverigetopplistan)	11
Switzerland (Schweizer Hitparade)	6
UK Singles (Official Charts)	41
UK Rock & Metal (Official Charts)	1
Ukraine Airplay (TopHit)	18
US Billboard Hot 100	44
US Adult Pop Airplay (Billboard)	12
US Pop Airplay (Billboard)	30

=== Year-end charts ===
Chart (2011)	Position
Germany (Official German Charts)	85
Netherlands (Dutch Top 40)	71
Russia Airplay (TopHit)	166
Chart (2012)	Position
Canada (Canadian Hot 100)	81
Hungary (Rádiós Top 40)	35
Russia Airplay (TopHit)	30
Sweden (Sverigetopplistan)	83
Ukraine Airplay (TopHit)	32

== Certifications ==
Region	Certification	Certified units/sales
Australia (ARIA)	Platinum	70,000^{^}
Canada (Music Canada)	Platinum	80,000^{*}
Denmark (IFPI Danmark)	Gold	15,000^{^}
Finland (Musiikkituottajat)	Gold	5,782
Germany (BVMI)	Gold	150,000^{^}
New Zealand (RMNZ)	Gold	15,000^{‡}
Sweden (GLF)	2× Platinum	80,000^{‡}
Switzerland (IFPI Switzerland)	Gold	15,000^{^}
United Kingdom (BPI)	Silver	200,000^{‡}
Streaming
Denmark (IFPI Danmark)	Platinum	900,000^{†}
^{*} Sales figures based on certification alone.^{^} Shipments figures based on certification alone.^{‡} Sales+streaming figures based on certification alone.^{†} Streaming-only figures based on certification alone.

== Release history ==
Release dates and formats for "When We Stand Together"
Region	Date	Format	Label(s)	Ref.
United States	October 4, 2011	Mainstream airplay	Roadrunner	

== See also ==
- List of anti-war songs
