= Here and Now (Nickelback album) =

Studio album by Nickelback
- Released: November 21, 2011
- Recorded: 2011
- Studio: Mountain View Studios (Abbotsford, British Columbia)
- Genres: Post-grunge; hard rock; alternative rock; pop rock
- Length: 39:48
- Labels: Roadrunner; Universal Music Canada
- Producers: Nickelback; Joey Moi; Brian Howes

Nickelback chronology
Dark Horse (2008)	Here and Now (2011)	The Best of Nickelback Volume 1 (2013)

Singles from Here and Now
- 1. "When We Stand Together" Released: September 21, 2011; 2. "Bottoms Up" Released: September 26, 2011; 3. "This Means War" Released: February 14, 2012; 4. "Lullaby" Released: February 24, 2012; 5. "Trying Not to Love You" Released: August 20, 2012

Here and Now is the seventh studio album by Canadian rock band Nickelback, and is their last to be released on Roadrunner Records. The album was released on November 21, 2011. On September 26, the band officially released two singles, "When We Stand Together" and "Bottoms Up". Both songs were made available for download on September 27, 2011. The first track of the record, "This Means War", was released on November 10, 2011, as the third single. The album's cover features Vancouver's Gastown Steam Clock. The clock is set at 11:21, the date the album was released.

The album debuted at number two on the US Billboard 200 after selling approximately 227,000 copies in its first week, just 0.18% below the number one spot, Michael Bublé's Christmas. Nickelback toured in support of the album on their Here and Now Tour. As of October 2013, the album has sold two million copies worldwide.

== Reception ==
=== Critical response ===
Professional ratings
Aggregate scores
Source	Rating
Metacritic	51/100
Review scores
Source	Rating
AllMusic	3.5/5 stars
The A.V. Club	C
Billboard	4/5 stars
Blabbermouth.net	1/5 stars
Classic Rock	1/5 stars
Consequence of Sound	2/5 stars
Entertainment Weekly	C+
Kerrang!	1/5 stars
NOW	2/5 stars

According to Metacritic, the album has received an average review score of 51/100, based on nine reviews, indicating "mixed reviews". Consequence of Sound awarded the album two out of a possible five stars, stating that "Here and Now might prove to be a step above the last effort, but likewise a step high enough to hang its creators on a barn rafter". Conversely, Canadian music and entertainment website Rockstar Weekly called it "far and away, the best Canadian album of 2011".

=== Commercial performance ===
The album has topped both the HMV Canada CD sales chart and the US iTunes Album chart in its first week of sales. The album debuted at number 10 in the UK charts. On December 16, 2011, the album was certified gold by the British Phonographic Industry (BPI) for shipments of 100,000 copies in the UK.

== Track listing ==
The track list of the album was revealed on September 26, 2011.

No.	Title	Lyrics	Music	Producer(s)	Length
1.	"This Means War"	Chad Kroeger	C. Kroeger	Nickelback; Joey Moi	3:20
2.	"Bottoms Up"	C. Kroeger; Mike Kroeger; Moi	C. Kroeger	Nickelback; Moi	3:37
3.	"When We Stand Together"	C. Kroeger; M. Kroeger; Ryan Peake; Moi	C. Kroeger; Peake	Nickelback; Moi	3:10
4.	"Midnight Queen"	C. Kroeger; Peake; Moi	C. Kroeger	Nickelback; Brian Howes	3:14
5.	"Gotta Get Me Some"	C. Kroeger; Moi	C. Kroeger	Nickelback; Moi	3:41
6.	"Lullaby"	C. Kroeger; Craig Wiseman; Chris Tompkins; Rodney Clawson	C. Kroeger; Wiseman; Tompkins; Clawson	Nickelback; Moi; Howes	3:48
7.	"Kiss It Goodbye"	C. Kroeger; M. Kroeger; Moi	C. Kroeger	Nickelback; Howes	3:35
8.	"Trying Not to Love You"	C. Kroeger; Peake; Brett Warren; Brad Warren	C. Kroeger	Nickelback; Howes; Moi	4:11
9.	"Holding on to Heaven"	C. Kroeger; M. Kroeger	C. Kroeger	Nickelback; Howes	3:51
10.	"Everything I Wanna Do"	C. Kroeger	C. Kroeger	Nickelback; Howes	3:27
11.	"Don't Ever Let It End"	C. Kroeger	C. Kroeger	Nickelback; Howes	3:49
Total length:					39:48

Japanese bonus tracks
No.	Title	Lyrics	Music	Producer(s)	Length
12.	"Burn It to the Ground" (live at Summer Sonic 2010)	C. Kroeger	C. Kroeger	Nickelback	4:15
13.	"Something in Your Mouth" (live at Summer Sonic 2010)	C. Kroeger	C. Kroeger	Nickelback; Howes	4:12
14.	"Photograph" (live at Summer Sonic 2010)	C. Kroeger	C. Kroeger	Nickelback; Howes	4:57

== Personnel ==
Musicians

- Chad Kroeger – lead vocals, lead and rhythm guitar, production
- Ryan Peake – rhythm and lead guitar, piano, backing vocals, production
- Mike Kroeger – bass, production
- Daniel Adair – drums, backing vocals, production

Additional personnel

- Brian Howes – production, additional guitar
- Rob Dawson – acoustic guitar on "Lullaby"
- Joey Moi – production, engineering
- Jay Van Poederooyen – engineering, mixing on tracks 6 and 9.
- Scott Cooke – engineering, editing
- Chris Lord-Alge – mixing on tracks 4, 8, 10, 11.
- Randy Staub – mixing on tracks 1, 2, 3, 5, 7.
- Keith Armstrong – mixing assistance
- Zach Blackstone – mixing assistance
- Nik Karpen – mixing assistance
- Ted Jensen – mastering
- Gail Marowitz – art direction
- Travis Shinn – photography
- Brennan Brousseau – cover artwork

== Charts ==
=== Weekly charts ===
Chart (2011)	Peak position
Australian Albums (ARIA)	1
Austrian Albums (Ö3 Austria)	3
Belgian Albums (Ultratop Flanders)	49
Belgian Albums (Ultratop Wallonia)	75
Canadian Albums (Billboard)	1
Danish Albums (Hitlisten)	22
Dutch Albums (Album Top 100)	19
Finnish Albums (Suomen virallinen lista)	7
French Albums (SNEP)	77
German Albums (Offizielle Top 100)	2
Hungarian Albums (MAHASZ)	10
Irish Albums (IRMA)	26
Italian Albums (FIMI)	18
Japanese Albums (Oricon)	1
New Zealand Albums (RMNZ)	7
Norwegian Albums (VG-lista)	12
Scottish Albums (Official Charts)	11
Spanish Albums (Promusicae)	44
Swedish Albums (Sverigetopplistan)	6
Swiss Albums (Schweizer Hitparade)	2
UK Albums (Official Charts)	10
UK Rock & Metal Albums (Official Charts)	1
US Billboard 200	2
US Top Alternative Albums (Billboard)	1
US Top Hard Rock Albums (Billboard)	1
US Top Rock Albums (Billboard)	1

=== Year-end charts ===
Chart (2011)	Position
Australian Albums (ARIA)	19
Austrian Albums (Ö3 Austria)	74
German Albums (Offizielle Top 100)	42
Swedish Albums (Sverigetopplistan)	73
Swiss Albums (Schweizer Hitparade)	35
UK Albums (OCC)	123

Chart (2012)	Position
Australian Albums (ARIA)	30
Canadian Albums (Billboard)	4
Swedish Albums (Sverigetopplistan)	100
Swiss Albums (Schweizer Hitparade)	37
US Billboard 200	15
US Top Rock Albums (Billboard)	3

=== Decade-end charts ===
Chart (2010–2019)	Position
Australian Albums (ARIA)	72

== Certifications ==
Region	Certification	Certified units/sales
Australia (ARIA)	2× Platinum	140,000^{^}
Canada (Music Canada)	2× Platinum	160,000^{^}
Denmark (IFPI Danmark)	Platinum	20,000^{‡}
Finland (Musiikkituottajat)	Gold	17,227
Germany (BVMI)	Gold	100,000^{^}
New Zealand (RMNZ)	Platinum	15,000^{‡}
Poland (ZPAV)	Gold	10,000^{*}
Sweden (GLF)	Gold	20,000^{‡}
Switzerland (IFPI Switzerland)	Platinum	30,000^{^}
United Kingdom (BPI)	Gold	100,000^{^}
United States (RIAA)	Platinum	1,000,000^{^}
^{*} Sales figures based on certification alone.^{^} Shipments figures based on certification alone.^{‡} Sales+streaming figures based on certification alone.

== Appearances ==
- The song "This Means War" was featured as downloadable content for the video game Rock Band in 2011.
