= Leader of Men =

Single by Nickelback

from the album The State
- Released: March 4, 2000
- Recorded: 1998
- Genre: Alternative metal
- Length: 3:30
- Label: Roadrunner
- Songwriters: Chad Kroeger; Ryan Peake
- Producers: Dale Penner; Nickelback

Nickelback singles chronology
"Fly" (1996)	"Leader of Men" (2000)	"Old Enough" (2000)

"Leader of Men" is a song by Canadian rock band Nickelback. Written by band members Chad Kroeger and Ryan Peake, it was featured on the band's second studio album The State in 1998. Upon the album's reissue after the band signed with Roadrunner Records, "Leader of Men" was released as the first single from The State on March 4, 2000, reaching number 11 on the Canadian Top Rock Songs, number 8 on the US Billboard Mainstream Rock chart and number 21 on the Alternative Songs chart.

Both versions of the song feature on the album; the original version features as the third track, while the acoustic version is the eleventh and final track.

== Origin and recording ==
Nickelback's lead vocalist and guitarist Chad Kroeger began writing "Leader of Men" as early as 1996, although it was not recorded until the band began work on its second album The State in 1998. The band's second guitarist and backing vocalist Ryan Peake is credited as a co-writer on the track. According to Kroeger, who wrote the lyrics to the song while under the influence of "magic mushrooms", many of the lines in the song are "about what you're going through when you're [high]". The song was held back for some time as the band felt that it was "not a good representation of what [they] honestly sound like", but was later considered and ultimately chosen for inclusion on the album after feedback from Peake's girlfriend, who told Kroeger that "You have to record that on the next album. It's a great song".

In an analysis of "Leader of Men", University of Leeds lecturer Derek B. Scott claimed that the song "demonstrates all the hallmarks of the grunge aesthetic", outlining that it begins with "a long, brooding verse with tense, harmonically static and percussive guitar work, vocal lines low in the singer's register, and quiet drumming" before later featuring a "sudden and dramatic shift to a chorus featuring a soaring vocal in a higher tessitura, and greater volume, intensity and melodic and harmonic development". In addition to the regular recording of the track, an acoustic version of "Leader of Men" was also featured on The State; reviewing the album for AllMusic, JT Griffith claimed that the inclusion of the second version of the song "would be more impressive if the song were not so bland and still strangely familiar".

== Release and reception ==
"Leader of Men" debuted on the RPM Canadian Top Rock Songs chart at its peak position of number 11 on April 12, 1999. The single later debuted on the US Billboard Hot Mainstream Rock Tracks chart at number 37 for the week of March 4, 2000. It remained in the top 40 for a total of 25 weeks, peaking at number 8 for the week of May 13, 2000. The song also reached number 21 on the Billboard Alternative Songs chart (then known as Hot Modern Rock Tracks) for the week of August 12, 2000, after 16 weeks on the chart since entering at number 40 on July 1, 2000. At the end of the year, the song ranked at number 27 on the end of year Mainstream Rock chart.

"Leader of Men" was also featured on the MTV compilation album MTV: The Return of the Rock, Vol. 2 in November 2000, as well as the band's own Japan-only release Three-Sided Coin in 2002. The song's music video was nominated for the MuchMusic Video Award for Best Rock Video in 2000, and was later included on The Videos and The Ultimate Video Collection.

== Track listings ==
Australia CD single

1. "Leader of Men"
2. "Leader of Men" (acoustic)
3. "Just Four"

US promo single #1

1. "Leader of Men" (LP version)
2. "Leader of Men" (radio edit)
3. "Leader of Men" (acoustic)
4. "Leader of Men" (call out hook #1)
5. "Leader of Men" (call out hook #2)

US promo single #2

1. "Leader of Men" (snippet)
2. "Old Enough"
3. "One Last Run"

- Some versions of the CD single also featured the "Leader of Men" music video.

== Personnel ==
Credits adapted from the liner notes of The State.

- Chad Kroeger – lead vocals, guitar, production
- Ryan Peake – guitar, backing vocals, production
- Mike Kroeger – bass, production
- Ryan Vikedal – drums, production
- Dale Penner – production
- Garth "GGGarth" Richardson – mixing
- Three Mountain Design – design
- Neil Zlozower – photography

== Chart positions ==
=== Weekly charts ===
Chart (1999–2000)	Peak position
Canadian Top Rock Songs (RPM)	11
US Mainstream Rock Tracks (Billboard)	8
US Modern Rock Tracks (Billboard)	21

=== Year-end charts ===
Chart (2000)	Position
US Mainstream Rock Tracks (Billboard)	27

== Certifications ==
Region	Certification	Certified units/sales
Canada (Music Canada)	Gold	40,000^{‡}
^{‡} Sales+streaming figures based on certification alone.
