= This Means War (Nickelback song) =

Single by Nickelback

from the album Here and Now
- Released: February 14, 2012
- Recorded: 2011
- Studio: Mountain View (Abbotsford, British Columbia)
- Genre: Heavy metal; alternative metal
- Length: 3:20
- Label: Roadrunner
- Songwriter: Chad Kroeger
- Producers: Joey Moi; Nickelback

Nickelback singles chronology
"Bottoms Up" (2011)	"This Means War" (2012)	"Lullaby" (2012)

Music video
- "This Means War" on YouTube

"This Means War" is the third single from the Canadian rock band Nickelback's seventh studio album, Here and Now. It was initially released as a promotional single in Germany on November 10, 2011, and was later released as a radio single in the United States on February 14, 2012. On February 16, 2012, a behind-the-scenes video is posted on nickelbacktv on YouTube. A music video was shot for the single, it premiered on March 29, 2012. It was also used as the official theme song for WWE's Elimination Chamber (2012).

== Track listing ==
- "This Means War" (album version)
- "This Means War" (rock version)

== Charts ==
=== Weekly charts ===
Chart (2012)	Peak position
Canada Rock (Billboard)	9
US Hot Rock & Alternative Songs (Billboard)	18

=== Year-end charts ===
Chart (2012)	Position
US Hot Rock & Alternative Songs (Billboard)	66
