= Bottoms Up (Nickelback song) =

Single by Nickelback

from the album Here and Now
- Released: September 26, 2011 (rock radio only)
- Genre: Hard rock
- Length: 3:39
- Label: Roadrunner
- Songwriters: Chad Kroeger; Mike Kroeger; Joey Moi
- Producers: Nickelback; Joey Moi

Nickelback singles chronology
| "When We Stand Together" (2011) | "Bottoms Up" (2011) | "This Means War" (2011) |

"Bottoms Up" is a single by Canadian rock band Nickelback as the second single from their seventh studio album, Here and Now.

A Billboard review of the song said that it was a "surprising return to [...] bawdy arena rock", but that it was also "amazingly monolithic" and "lack[ed] the slick melodies of the group's past hits".

== Release ==
The song was made free for listening on the band's official website on September 22, 2011 and was released as an official single on September 26. It was made available for download on September 27. The official lyric video for "Bottoms Up" was released on YouTube on November 17.

== Track listing ==
=== UK track listing ===
1. "Bottoms Up" (clean edit)
2. "Bottoms Up" (album version)

=== US track listing ===
1. "Bottoms Up" (clean edit)

== Charts ==
| Chart (2011–2012) | Peak position |
|---|---|
| Australia (ARIA) | 83 |
| Canada Hot 100 (Billboard) | 31 |
| Canada Rock (Billboard) | 5 |
| UK Singles (The Official Charts Company) | 179 |
| UK Rock & Metal (Official Charts) | 4 |
| US Bubbling Under Hot 100 (Billboard) | 1 |
| US Hot Rock & Alternative Songs (Billboard) | 6 |

=== Year-end charts ===
| Chart (2012) | Peak position |
|---|---|
| US Hot Rock Songs (Billboard) | 57 |
