= Daniel Adair =

Canadian drummer (born 1975)

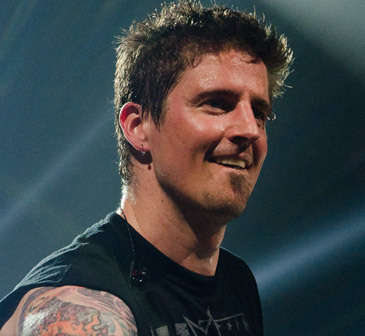
- Adair playing with Nickelback in 2011

Background information
- Born: Daniel Patrick Adair; February 19, 1975 (age 51); Vancouver, British Columbia, Canada
- Genres: Post-grunge; hard rock; alternative rock; alternative metal; jazz fusion
- Occupation: Musician
- Instrument: Drums
- Years active: 1995–present
- Member of: Nickelback; Martone; Suspect
- Formerly of: 3 Doors Down

Daniel Patrick Adair is a Canadian drummer. He has been a member of the rock band Nickelback since 2005 and was with 3 Doors Down from 2002 until 2005. On the side, he works with the band Suspect and the instrumental fusion band Martone.

== Biography ==
Adair auditioned for guitarist Dave Martone, a Berklee College of Music graduate, who had just begun an instrumental fusion band called Martone. As of 2020, Adair was the drummer on all Martone albums (except its first studio album Shut Up 'n Listen released in 1995). The band recorded its first album with Adair in 1999.

In 2002, Adair joined the multi-platinum, Mississippi-based rock band 3 Doors Down, as the touring and studio drummer. (Other drummers were used for video shoots and TV appearances.) During his time with the band, they recorded the studio album Seventeen Days and live album Another 700 Miles, toured 14 countries, and had multiple TV appearances.

Adair left 3 Doors Down to join the Canadian band Nickelback. In 2005, they released the album All the Right Reasons which debuted at #1 on Billboard and went multi-platinum.

On October 21, 2007, James Stephen Hart (former frontman of Eighteen Visions) announced that Adair was recording drum tracks for his new band, Burn Halo.

In 2008, Nickelback released their follow-up album Dark Horse and the first single on that album, "Gotta Be Somebody", was released on September 29 in North America. The album was produced by Joey Moi and Mutt Lange.

In 2011, Adair along with the other band members of Nickelback released Here and Now. This album includes singles "This Means War" and "Bottoms Up".

Adair holds a private pilot licence, originally learning to fly on ultralight aircraft, and currently owns a Maule M-7. In 2020, Adair was diagnosed with radial tunnel syndrome.

== Discography ==
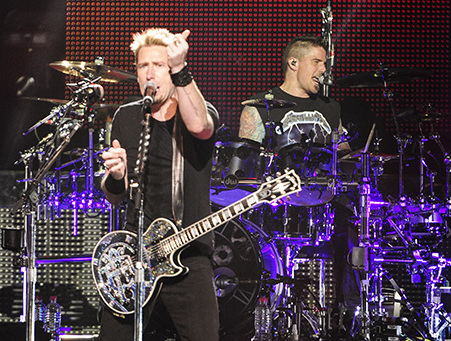
Adair (background) with Nickelback in 2012

Year	Group	Album	Notes
1995	Martone	Shut Up 'N Listen	
1999	Martone	Zone	
2002	Martone	A Demon's Dream	
2003	Suspect	Suspect	
2004	3 Doors Down	Another 700 Miles	Live album – Away from the Sun tour
2005	3 Doors Down	3 Doors Down Live DVD	
2005	3 Doors Down	Seventeen Days	
2005	Nickelback	All the Right Reasons	
2005	Theory of a Deadman	Gasoline	Song: "Santa Monica"
2006	Bo Bice	The Real Thing	Song: "You're Everything"
2006	Martone	When Aliens Come	
2007	Martone	When Aliens Come	
2007	Martone	Live in Your Face DVD	
2008	Martone	Clean	
2008	Nickelback	Dark Horse	
2009	Martone	Clean	
2009	Burn Halo	Burn Halo	
2009	Thornley	Tiny Pictures	
2011	Nickelback	Here and Now	Songs: "This Means War", "Bottoms Up"
2014	Nickelback	No Fixed Address	
2017	Nickelback	Feed the Machine	
2022	Nickelback	Get Rollin'	
