= Ryan Peake =

Canadian guitarist (born 1973)

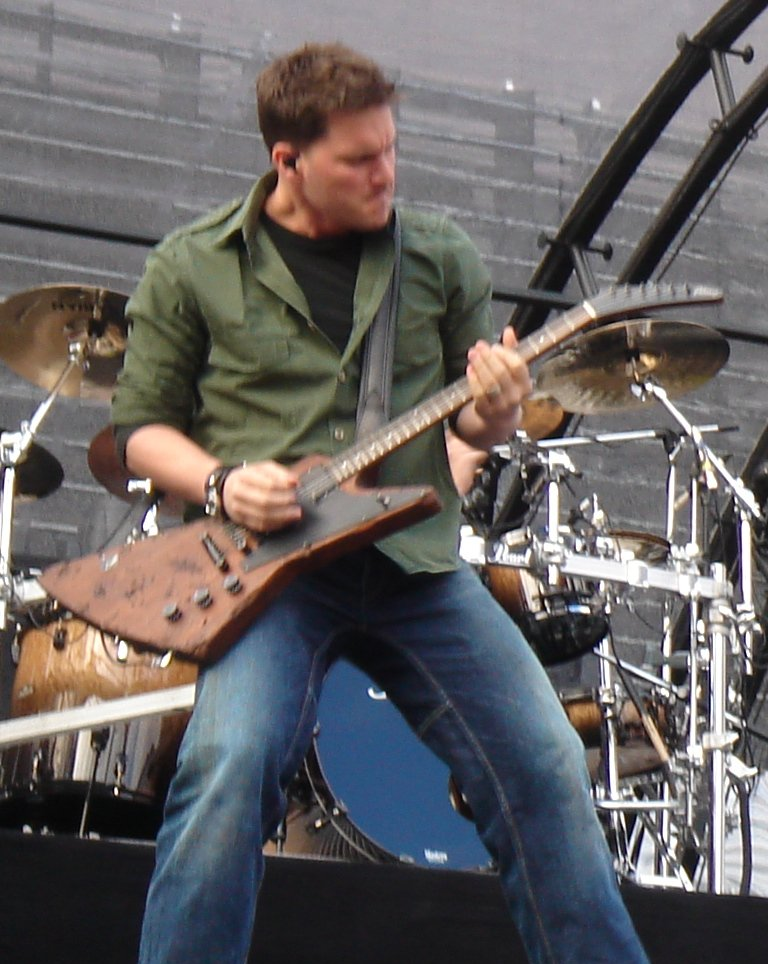
- Peake performing in 2006

Background information
- Born: Ryan Anthony Peake; March 1, 1973 (age 53); Brooks, Alberta, Canada
- Genres: Post-grunge; hard rock; pop rock; alternative rock; alternative metal
- Occupations: Musician; songwriter
- Instruments: Guitar; keyboards; vocals; mandolin
- Years active: 1995–present
- Member of: Nickelback

Ryan Anthony Peake (born March 1, 1973) is a Canadian musician who is the rhythm guitarist, keyboardist, and backing vocalist of the rock band Nickelback. He has been with the band since their inception and is best known for his prominent vocals on the Nickelback songs "Savin' Me", "Hollywood", and "Gotta Be Somebody".

He has performed lead vocals on a range of different cover songs at live Nickelback concerts such as "Saturday Night's Alright for Fighting", "Use Somebody", "I Ran", "Everlong" and "Super Bon Bon". When Nickelback performs Chad Kroeger's solo hit "Hero" live, Peake sings the vocal parts originally performed by Josey Scott.

Peake has writing credits for several Nickelback songs such as "Someday", "Savin' Me", "Miss You", and "Edge of a Revolution". Peake's instruments have included Gibson Flying Vs, Gibson Explorers, and Gibson Les Pauls. When Nickelback performs their song "Photograph", he uses an acoustic guitar once owned by his father.

Peake "grew up with solid metal", listing such bands as Anthrax, Megadeth, and Metallica as early favorites. He subsequently grew interested in Canadian country rock group Blue Rodeo, mentioning that their music "really got me thinking about what fits together. Chord-wise, melody-wise, where harmonies feel good and feel right." Along with brothers Chad and Mike Kroeger, Peake cofounded Village Idiot, a cover band with a playlist consisting primarily of Metallica songs. The band mostly played in bars in and around Peake and the Kroegers' hometown of Hanna, Alberta, Canada. Later, the group reformed as Nickelback and Peake was responsible for the early funding of the band, borrowing $30,000 from a local bank on a line of credit. Early in his career, Peake primarily played Fender Telecasters.

Peake is married to Treana Peake, a Mount Pleasant, Vancouver-based fashion designer and philanthropist, actively involved in her charity-based fashion company, Obakki. The couple met in high school and have two children together. Peake tests new music he's working on with his wife, son, daughter, and brother.

== Discography ==
- Nickelback discography
