= Santana videography =

Santana discography
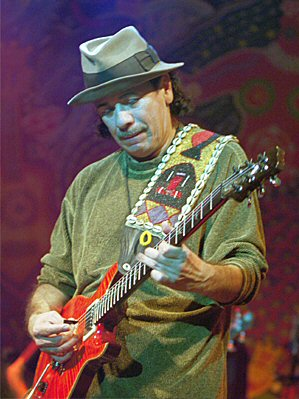
- Santana in Munich on 21 January 2000
- Video albums: 4
- Music videos: 14

The videography of Santana, a Mexican-American rock guitarist, and his band Santana currently consists of 4 video albums and 14 video singles.

Over a career spanning forty years, Santana has been seen as exemplifying latin rock, whilst diversifying into other genres. Santana sold in the following years more than 100 million album copies to date. His best-selling album so far is Supernatural, which sold over 27 million copies worldwide. Rolling Stone named Santana number 15 on their list of the 100 Greatest Guitarists of All Time in 2003. He has won 10 Grammy Awards and 3 Latin Grammy Awards.

== Video albums ==
Year	Album	Details	Certifications
1988	Viva Santana!	Released: 1988; Label: CMV Enterprises; Format: VHS, LD, DVD	US: Gold
1993	Sacred Fire: Live in South America	Released: 1993; Label: PolyGram Video; Format: VHS, LD, DVD	US: Platinum; ARG: Platinum
2000	Supernatural Live: An Evening with Carlos Santana and Friends	Released: September 12, 2000; Label: Arista, Image Entertainment; Format: VHS, DVD	US: 3× Multi-Platinum; AUS: 6× Platinum
2005	Live by Request	Released: November 14, 2005; Label: Arista; Format: DVD	US: Platinum; AUS: 2× Platinum

== Music videos ==
Year	Music video	Featuring	Director(s)	Album
1990	"The Healer"	John Lee Hooker		The Healer (John Lee Hooker album)
1999	"Smooth"	Rob Thomas	Marcus Raboy	Supernatural
1999	"Maria Maria"	The Product G&B	Marcus Raboy	Supernatural
1999	"Put Your Lights On"	Everlast	Marcus Raboy	Supernatural
2000	"Corazón Espinado"	Maná	Adolfo Doring	Supernatural
2002	"The Game of Love"	Michelle Branch	Paul Fedor	Shaman
2002	"Nothing at All"	Musiq	Marc Webb	Shaman
2002	"Why Don't You & I"	Chad Kroeger	Marc Webb	Shaman
2005	"I'm Feeling You"	Michelle Branch and The Wreckers	The Malloys	All That I Am
2005	"Just Feel Better"	Steven Tyler	Dave Meyers	All That I Am
2006	"Cry Baby Cry"	Sean Paul and Joss Stone	Chris Robinson	All That I Am
2007	"Into the Night"	Chad Kroeger	Jessy Terrero	Ultimate Santana
2010	"While My Guitar Gently Weeps"	India Arie and Yo-Yo Ma		Guitar Heaven: The Greatest Guitar Classics of All Time
2014	"La Flaca"	Juanes		Corazón

== Guest appearances ==
Year	Album	Director
1993	"Live"	Edwin Harper
1995	"Sworn to the Drum: A Tribute to Francisco Aguabella"	Les Blank
2000	"One Night Only"	
2001	"Paco de Lucía-Light and Shade: A Portrait"	Michael Meert
2003	"Cry"	
2004	"Trey Anastasio with Special Guest Carlos Santana"	
2004	"World Music Portraits"	
2004	"Crossroads Guitar Festival"	
2004	"Miles Electric: A Different Kind of Blue"	Murray Lerner
2007	"Carlos Santana and Wayne Shorter"	
