= No Fixed Address Tour =

2015–16 concert tour by Nickelback

- World tour by Nickelback
- Promotional poster for the tour
- Location: North America; Australia; Japan; Europe
- Associated album: No Fixed Address
- Start date: February 14, 2015
- End date: October 25, 2016
- Legs: 4
- No. of shows: 105 (37 postponed, 68 played)

Nickelback concert chronology
- Here and Now Tour (2012–13); No Fixed Address Tour (2015–16); Feed the Machine Tour (2017)

The No Fixed Address Tour was the fifth headlining concert tour by Canadian rock band Nickelback, in support of their eighth studio album No Fixed Address. The tour was announced on November 5, 2014, as well as The Pretty Reckless, Pop Evil, and Lifehouse as the support act for the majority of the shows in North American while Monster Truck will be the support act in Australia and Europe (2016).

The second North American leg of the tour had to be canceled when lead vocalist Chad Kroeger required surgery for a cyst on his voice box. The entire leg of the European tour was postponed until Autumn 2016.

== Set list ==
Some songs not performed at every show

1. "Million Miles an Hour"
2. "Something in Your Mouth"
3. "Photograph"
4. "Hero"
5. "What Are You Waiting For?" or "Gotta Be Somebody"
6. "Far Away"
7. "Edge of a Revolution"
8. "Master of Puppets"/"Walk" (Metallica, Pantera covers)
9. "Too Bad"
10. "Someday"
11. "Animals"
12. "Moby Dick" (Led Zeppelin cover, drum solo)
13. "She Keeps Me Up"
14. "Take It Easy"/"Hotel California" (Eagles covers)
15. "Summer of '69" (Bryan Adams cover)
16. "Rockstar"
17. "When We Stand Together"
18. "Figured You Out"
19. "How You Remind Me"

Encore

20. "Everlong" (Foo Fighters cover)
21. "Burn It to the Ground"

Songs performed in Saskatoon

- "Blow at High Dough" (The Tragically Hip cover)
- "Don't Stop Believin'" (Journey cover)

== Tour dates ==
Date	City	Country	Venue	Opening act(s)	Attendance	Gross revenue
North America
February 14, 2015	Allentown	United States	PPL Center	The Pretty Reckless; Pop Evil; Lifehouse	—N/a	—N/a
February 18, 2015	Montreal	Canada	Bell Centre	The Pretty Reckless; Pop Evil; Lifehouse	9,874 / 11,616	$600,835
February 21, 2015	London	Canada	Budweiser Gardens	The Pretty Reckless; Pop Evil; Lifehouse	7,688 / 8,679	$523,544
February 22, 2015	Toronto	Canada	Air Canada Centre	The Pretty Reckless; Pop Evil; Lifehouse	10,093 / 10,093	$524,916
February 24, 2015	Grand Rapids	United States	Van Andel Arena	The Pretty Reckless; Pop Evil; Lifehouse	—N/a	—N/a
February 25, 2015	Louisville	United States	KFC Yum! Center	The Pretty Reckless; Pop Evil; Lifehouse	—N/a	—N/a
February 27, 2015	Columbus	United States	Nationwide Arena	The Pretty Reckless; Pop Evil; Lifehouse	—N/a	—N/a
February 28, 2015	Moline	United States	iWireless Center	The Pretty Reckless; Pop Evil; Lifehouse	8,082 / 10,027	$440,979
March 2, 2015	Kansas City	United States	Sprint Center	The Pretty Reckless; Pop Evil; Lifehouse	—N/a	—N/a
March 3, 2015	Sioux Falls	United States	Denny Sanford Premier Center	The Pretty Reckless; Pop Evil; Lifehouse	—N/a	—N/a
March 8, 2015	Winnipeg	Canada	MTS Centre	The Pretty Reckless; Pop Evil; Lifehouse	—N/a	—N/a
March 10, 2015	Saskatoon	Canada	SaskTel Centre	The Pretty Reckless; Pop Evil; Lifehouse	—N/a	—N/a
March 12, 2015	Calgary	Canada	Scotiabank Saddledome	The Pretty Reckless; Pop Evil; Lifehouse	—N/a	—N/a
March 13, 2015	Edmonton	Canada	Rexall Place	The Pretty Reckless; Pop Evil; Lifehouse	—N/a	—N/a
March 15, 2015	Vancouver	Canada	Rogers Arena	The Pretty Reckless; Pop Evil; Lifehouse	—N/a	—N/a
March 27, 2015	Tampa	United States	MidFlorida Credit Union Amphitheatre	The Pretty Reckless; Pop Evil; Lifehouse	—N/a	—N/a
March 28, 2015	West Palm Beach	United States	Coral Sky Amphitheatre	The Pretty Reckless; Pop Evil; Lifehouse	20,000/20,000	—N/a
March 30, 2015	Nashville	United States	Bridgestone Arena	The Pretty Reckless; Pop Evil; Lifehouse	3,500 / 6,000	—N/a
April 1, 2015	The Woodlands	United States	Cynthia Woods Mitchell Pavilion	The Pretty Reckless; Pop Evil; Lifehouse	—N/a	—N/a
April 3, 2015	Dallas	United States	Gexa Energy Pavilion	The Pretty Reckless; Pop Evil; Lifehouse	—N/a	—N/a
April 4, 2015	Austin	United States	Austin360 Amphitheatre	The Pretty Reckless; Pop Evil; Lifehouse	—N/a	—N/a
April 7, 2015	Tulsa	United States	BOK Center	The Pretty Reckless; Pop Evil; Lifehouse	5,581 / 7,655	$346,869
Australia
May 15, 2015	Melbourne	Australia	Rod Laver Arena	Monster Truck	14,067 / 14,067	$1,037,290
May 16, 2015	Melbourne	Australia	Rod Laver Arena	Monster Truck	14,067 / 14,067	$1,037,290
May 18, 2015	Adelaide	Australia	Adelaide Entertainment Center	Monster Truck	—N/a	—N/a
May 20, 2015	Brisbane	Australia	Brisbane Entertainment Centre	Monster Truck	8,106 / 8,106	$767,742
May 22, 2015	Sydney	Australia	Allphones Arena	Monster Truck	11,059 / 12,120	$1,028,780
May 23, 2015	Newcastle	Australia	Newcastle Entertainment Centre	Monster Truck	4,300 / 6,703	$333,249
May 26, 2015	Perth	Australia	Perth Arena	Monster Truck	7,491 / 8,665	$660,167
Japan
May 30, 2015	Tokyo	Japan	Tokyo Gymnasium	N/A	—N/a	—N/a
June 2, 2015	Osaka	Japan	Zepp	N/A	—N/a	—N/a
Europe
September 2, 2016	Helsinki	Finland	Hartwall Arena	Monster Truck	—N/a	—N/a
September 4, 2016	Oslo	Norway	Spektrum	Monster Truck	—N/a	—N/a
September 6, 2016	Stockholm	Sweden	Ericsson Globe	Monster Truck	—N/a	—N/a
September 8, 2016	Herning	Denmark	Jyske Bank Boxen	Monster Truck	—N/a	—N/a
September 10, 2016	Kaunas	Lithuania	Žalgiris Arena	Monster Truck	—N/a	—N/a
September 13, 2016	Zürich	Switzerland	Hallenstadion	Monster Truck	—N/a	—N/a
September 16, 2016	Budapest	Hungary	László Papp Budapest Sports Arena	Monster Truck	—N/a	—N/a
September 18, 2016	Prague	Czech Republic	O2 Arena	Monster Truck	—N/a	—N/a
September 21, 2016	Warsaw	Poland	Torwar Hall	Monster Truck	—N/a	—N/a
September 23, 2016	Munich	Germany	Olympiahalle	Monster Truck	—N/a	—N/a
September 24, 2016	Hamburg	Germany	Barclaycard Arena	Monster Truck	—N/a	—N/a
September 26, 2016	Berlin	Germany	Mercedes-Benz Arena	Monster Truck	—N/a	—N/a
September 27, 2016	Cologne	Germany	Lanxess Arena	Monster Truck	—N/a	—N/a
September 29, 2016	Esch-sur-Alzette	Luxembourg	Rockhal	Monster Truck	—N/a	—N/a
September 30, 2016	Antwerp	Belgium	Lotto Arena	Monster Truck	—N/a	—N/a
October 2, 2016	Mannheim	Germany	SAP Arena	Monster Truck	—N/a	—N/a
October 3, 2016	Amsterdam	Netherlands	Ziggo Dome	Monster Truck	—N/a	—N/a
October 12, 2016	Nottingham	England	Nottingham Arena	Monster Truck	—N/a	—N/a
October 14, 2016	Birmingham	England	Genting Arena	Monster Truck	—N/a	—N/a
October 15, 2016	Sheffield	England	Sheffield Arena	Monster Truck	—N/a	—N/a
October 17, 2016	London	England	Wembley Arena	Monster Truck	—N/a	—N/a
October 19, 2016	Manchester	England	Manchester Arena	Monster Truck	—N/a	—N/a
October 20, 2016	London	England	The O2 Arena	Monster Truck	11,429 / 17,429	$594,167
October 22, 2016	Liverpool	England	Echo Arena	Monster Truck	—N/a	—N/a
October 24, 2016	Glasgow	Scotland	The SSE Hydro	Monster Truck	—N/a	—N/a
October 25, 2016	Newcastle	England	Newcastle Arena	Monster Truck	—N/a	—N/a
Total				Monster Truck	72,279 / 83,436	$5,239,992

== Critical reception ==
Adrien Begrand of PopMatters noted that this tour lacked the pyrotechnics that were used in their previous tour, the Here and Now Tour, and felt as if this tour would cater more to the mainstream country audience instead of the hard rock audience. The only production used in the show were a video screen, simple stage, restrained lighting and a set list filled with mostly ballads and covers. Begrand also felt like the covers were a cheap attempt to receive applause more than they would with their own songs. He did give praise to the performances of "Animals" and "She Keeps Me Up".
