= Ultimate Santana =

Compilation album by Santana
- Released: October 16, 2007
- Recorded: 1969–2007
- Genre: Latin rock
- Length: 76:37
- Labels: Arista; Columbia
- Producers: Fred Catero; Clive Davis

Singles from Ultimate Santana
- 1. "Into the Night" Released: October 2, 2007; 2. "This Boy's Fire" Released: April 2008

Professional ratings
Review scores
Source	Rating
AllMusic	3.5/5 stars
Sputnikmusic	3.5/5 stars

Ultimate Santana is a compilation by rock band Santana, combining hits from recent albums Supernatural, Shaman and All That I Am with early classics. Amongst the 18 tracks there are three new recordings. This album was made possible when Sony Music Entertainment (parent of Columbia Records) merged with BMG (parent of Arista) to form Sony BMG (Sony later bought BMG's share, subsequently reforming SME).

On November 3, 2007, the album debuted at number eight on the U.S. Billboard 200 chart, selling about 56,000 copies in its first week.

== Track listing ==
Credits adapted from the liner notes of Ultimate Santana.

No.	Title	Writer(s)	Producer(s)	Length
1.	"Into the Night" (featuring Chad Kroeger)	Chad Kroeger	Kroeger; Joey Moi	3:42
2.	"Smooth" (featuring Rob Thomas from Supernatural, 1999)	Itaal Shur; Rob Thomas	Matt Serletic	4:56
3.	"Maria Maria" (featuring The Product G&B from Supernatural)	Wyclef Jean; Jerry Duplessis; Marvin Moore-Hough; David McRae; Carlos Santana; Karl Perazzo; Raul Rekow	Jean; Duplessis	4:22
4.	"This Boy's Fire" (featuring Jennifer Lopez & Baby Bash)	Steve Morales; Raymond Diaz; Sean Garrett; Ronald Bryant	Morales; Diaz; Garrett; Cory Rooney; Luke "Dr. Luke" Gottwald	3:30
5.	"She's Not There" (from Moonflower, 1977)	Rod Argent	Santana; Tom Coster	3:30
6.	"Black Magic Woman" (from Abraxas, 1970)	Peter Green	Fred Catero; Santana	3:15
7.	"The Game of Love" (featuring Michelle Branch from Shaman, 2002)	Alex Ander; Rick Nowels	Ander; Nowels	4:15
8.	"Samba Pa Ti" (from Abraxas)	Santana	Bob Irwin	4:45
9.	"Evil Ways" (from Santana, 1969)	Clarence "Sonny" Henry	Brent Dangerfield; Santana	3:55
10.	"Put Your Lights On" (featuring Everlast from Supernatural)	Erik Schrody	Dante Ross; John Gamble	4:45
11.	"Corazón Espinado" (featuring Maná from Supernatural)	Fher Olvera	Olvera; KC Porter; Alex González^{[a]}	4:35
12.	"Why Don't You & I" (featuring Alex Band from Ceremony: Remixes & Rarities, 2003)	Kroeger	Lester Mendez; Kroeger^{[b]}	3:51
13.	"Just Feel Better" (featuring Steven Tyler from All That I Am, 2005)	Jamie Houston; Buck Johnson; Damon Johnson	John Shanks; Richie Supa^{[b]}	4:12
14.	"Europa (Earth's Cry Heaven's Smile)" (from Amigos, 1976)	Santana; Coster	David Rubinson	5:05
15.	"No One to Depend On" (from Santana III, 1971)	Michael Carabello; Coke Escovedo; Gregg Rolie	Santana	5:33
16.	"Oye Como Va" (from Abraxas)	Tito Puente	Catero; Santana	4:18
17.	"Interplanetary Party"	Santana	Santana	4:06
18.	"The Game of Love" (featuring Tina Turner)	Ander; Nowels	Ander; Nowels	4:22
Total length:				76:37

- ^{^[a]} signifies a co-producer
- ^{^[b]} signifies an additional vocal producer

== Personnel ==
- Vocals – Everlast, Jennifer Lopez, Alex Band, Mana, Michelle Branch, Rob Thomas, Steven Tyler, Baby Bash, The Product G&B, Tina Turner, Greg Walker
- Carlos Santana – lead, acoustic and electric guitar, lead & back vocals
- Chad Kroeger – guitar + vocals
- Everlast - rhythm guitar and vocals
- Neal Schon – guitar
- Rick Nowels - acoustic guitar
- Rusty Anerson - additional electric guitar
- Karl Perazzo – electric guitar, bass guitar
- David Brown – bass guitar
- Rodney Rietveld - bass guitar
- David Morgan - bass guitar
- Chester D. Thompson – Hammond B3 organ, piano
- David Delgado – Hammond B3 organ, keyboards
- Gregg Rolie – keyboards
- Rodney Holmes - drums
- Graham Lear - drums
- Michael Carabello – congas
- Raul Rekow - congas, percussions
- Karl Perazzo - percussions
- Carlo Steele - percussions
- Pete Escovedo - percussions
- Luis Conte - additional percussions
- Joseph Chepitos Areas - timbales
- Jeremy Cohan - violin
- Daniel Seidenberg, Hari Balakrisnan - viola
- Joseph Herbert - cello
- Jeff Cressman, Marty Wehner - trombone
- Bill Ortiz, Julius Melendez - trumpet

== Charts ==
=== Weekly charts ===
Chart (2007–2008)	Peak position
Australian Albums (ARIA)	6
Austrian Albums (Ö3 Austria)	28
Belgian Albums (Ultratop Flanders)	5
Belgian Albums (Ultratop Wallonia)	35
Canadian Albums (Billboard)	13
Danish Albums (Hitlisten)	18
Dutch Albums (Album Top 100)	68
Finnish Albums (Suomen virallinen lista)	4
German Albums (Offizielle Top 100)	19
Hungarian Albums (MAHASZ)	12
Irish Albums (IRMA)	22
Italian Albums (FIMI)	11
Mexican Albums (Top 100 Mexico)	31
New Zealand Albums (RMNZ)	3
Norwegian Albums (VG-lista)	7
Scottish Albums (Official Charts)	24
Spanish Albums (Promusicae)	16
Swiss Albums (Schweizer Hitparade)	13
UK Albums (Official Charts)	16
US Billboard 200	8
US Top Rock Albums (Billboard)	4

=== Year-end charts ===
Chart (2007)	Position
Australian Albums (ARIA)	40
Belgian Albums (Ultratop Flanders)	70

Chart (2008)	Position
Australian Albums (ARIA)	67
Belgian Albums (Ultratop Flanders)	94
US Billboard 200	155

== Certifications ==
Region	Certification	Certified units/sales
Australia (ARIA)	2× Platinum	140,000^{^}
Belgium (BRMA)	Gold	15,000^{*}
Germany (BVMI)	Gold	100,000^{‡}
Hungary (MAHASZ)	Platinum	6,000^{^}
New Zealand (RMNZ)	Platinum	15,000^{^}
Poland (ZPAV)	Gold	10,000^{*}
Russia (NFPF)	Gold	10,000^{*}
United Kingdom (BPI)	Gold	100,000^{‡}
United States (RIAA)	Gold	500,000^{^}
^{*} Sales figures based on certification alone.^{^} Shipments figures based on certification alone.^{‡} Sales+streaming figures based on certification alone.
