= Feed the Machine (disambiguation) =

Feed the Machine is a 2017 album by Nickelback.

Feed the Machine may also refer to:

- "Feed the Machine", a 1993 song by Icehouse from Big Wheel
- "Feed the Machine", a 2001 song by Quiet Riot from Guilty Pleasures
- "Feed the Machine" (Red song), a 2011 song by American rock band Red
- "Feed the Machine" (Nickelback song), a 2017 song by Canadian rock band Nickelback
- "Feed the Machine", a 2020 song by Poor Man's Poison

== See also ==
- Feed the Machine Tour, the 2017 tour by Nickelback
