= No Fixed Address =

No Fixed Address or no fixed address may refer to:

- No fixed abode, referring to people having no fixed geographic location for their residence
- No Fixed Address (band), an Australian Aboriginal reggae rock group formed in 1979
- No Fixed Address (album), a 2014 album by Nickelback
  - No Fixed Address Tour, a 2014–16 tour by Nickelback associated with the album
