= After the Rain (Nickelback song) =

Single by Nickelback

from the album Feed the Machine
- Released: October 22, 2017
- Genre: Alternative rock; pop rock; post-grunge; power pop
- Length: 3:34
- Label: BMG
- Songwriters: Chad Kroeger; Ali Tamposi

Nickelback singles chronology
| "Must Be Nice" (2017) | "After the Rain" (2017) | "The Devil Went Down to Georgia" (2020) |

"After the Rain"

Single by Nickelback

from the album Feed the Machine
- Released: October 22, 2017
- Genre: Alternative rock; pop rock
- Length: 3:34
- Label: BMG
- Songwriters: Chad Kroeger; Ali Tamposi

Nickelback singles chronology
| "Must Be Nice" (2017) | "After the Rain" (2017) | "The Devil Went Down to Georgia" (2020) |

"After the Rain" is a song by Canadian rock band Nickelback. It was released on October 22, 2017 as the fourth and final single from their ninth studio album, Feed the Machine. The song was written by frontman Chad Kroeger with Ali Tamposi, and is Nickelback's second collaboration with Tamposi after the latter had performed backing vocals on "She Keeps Me Up" in 2014.

== Background ==
In an interview with Louder Sound, lead singer Chad Kroeger said about the song's motivational theme "Often times in life I think we lose sight that our most challenging trials and tribulations can also be our most teachable moments. Those very hardships that we encounter aren't really obstacles at all. Rather, they are seeds that if planted properly will bear fruit that we can learn, grow and benefit from to be the very best versions of ourselves that we can be. And that is the message I wanted to get across in 'After the Rain'".

The band later released an official lyric video for the song on September 20, 2017.

== Personnel ==
- Chad Kroeger – lead vocals, guitar
- Ryan Peake – guitar, keyboards
- Mike Kroeger – bass guitar
- Daniel Adair – drums

== Charts ==
| Chart (2017) | Peak position |
|---|---|
| US Hot Rock & Alternative Songs (Billboard) | 43 |
