= Sick and Twisted Affair =

Studio album by My Darkest Days
- Released: March 26, 2012
- Genre: Alternative metal; hard rock; post-grunge
- Length: 30:07
- Label: 604
- Producer: Joey Moi

My Darkest Days chronology
| My Darkest Days (2010) | Sick and Twisted Affair (2012) |

Singles from Sick and Twisted Affair
- 1. "Casual Sex" Released: January 13, 2012; 2. "Sick and Twisted Affair" Released: May 10, 2012

Sick and Twisted Affair is the second and final album from Canadian rock band My Darkest Days. The album was released on March 26, 2012. It debuted at number 29 on the Billboard 200 and number nine on the Billboard Top Rock Albums chart. The song "Save Yourself" was included on the soundtrack of EA Sports' NHL 13 video game.

The album was rated 3 out of 5 stars by AllMusic.

== Track listing ==
| No. | Title | Writer(s) | Length |
|---|---|---|---|
| 1. | "Sick and Twisted Affair" | Matt Walst; Ted Bruner; Joey Moi | 3:38 |
| 2. | "Save Yourself" | Matt Walst; James Michaels; Joey Moi | 3:41 |
| 3. | "Casual Sex" | Matt Walst; Ted Bruner; Joey Moi | 3:13 |
| 4. | "Stutter" (Joe cover) | Ernest E. Dixon; Roy "Royalty" Hamilton | 2:43 |
| 5. | "Nature of the Beast" | Matt Walst; Jeff Johnson; Joey Moi | 3:00 |
| 6. | "Perfect" | Matt Walst; Brendan McMillian; James Michaels; Joey Moi | 3:48 |
| 7. | "Again" | Matt Walst; Ted Bruner; Joey Moi | 3:36 |
| 8. | "Gone" | Matt Walst; Ted Bruner; Joey Moi | 3:30 |
| 9. | "Love Crime" | Matt Walst; Sal Coz Costa; Cody Hanson; Reid Henry; Brendan McMillan; Doug Oliver | 2:58 |
| Total length: | | | 30:07 |

Special edition
| No. | Title | Writer(s) | Length |
|---|---|---|---|
| 10. | "Rolling Stoned" | Matt Walst; Ted Bruner; Joey Moi | 3:02 |
| 11. | "Casual Sex" (rock mix) | Matt Walst; Ted Bruner; Joey Moi | 3:16 |
| 12. | "Like Nobody Else" (Mountain View remix) | Matt Walst; Chad Kroeger | 3:38 |
| 13. | "Every Lie" (acoustic) | Matt Walst; Neil Sanderson; Casey Marshall; Harold Hess | 2:54 |
| 14. | "Porn Star Dancing" (acoustic – iTunes only bonus track) | | 3:16 |
| Total length: | | | 43:02 |

== Personnel ==
My Darkest Days

- Matt Walst – lead vocals, rhythm guitar
- Sal Coz Costa – lead guitar, vocals
- Brendan McMillan – bass guitar
- Doug Oliver – drums, percussion
- Reid Henry – keyboard, vocals, rhythm guitar

Additional personnel

- John 5 – guitar on "Casual Sex"
- Barry Stock – guitar on "Again"
