= Ceremony: Remixes & Rarities =

Compilation album by Santana
- Released: December 16, 2003
- Genre: Blues rock, hard rock, latin rock
- Label: Arista
- Producer: Various

Ceremony: Remixes and Rarities is a 2003 compilation by Santana and was the third album released under the Arista label. It was released on December 16, 2003, with a limited edition of 100,000 copies and featured five previously unreleased brand new songs, newly recorded versions or remixes of five songs that came from the first two albums (Supernatural 1999 and Shaman 2002), and one key album track. The album cover is by Sal Garcia, a prominent member of California's Chicano art movement, former curator at Galeria de la Raza and known to many as "the Mayor of 24th Street".

== Track listing ==
1. "Why Don't You & I" (new alternate version with Alex Band of The Calling on vocals)
2. "Smooth" (feat. Rob Thomas) (Chris Staropoli remix)
3. "Maria Maria" (feat. The Product G&B) (Wyclef remix)
4. "Foo Foo" (Sam "Sever" Citrin remix)
5. "Mañana"
6. "Truth Don Die"
7. "Let Me Love You Tonight" (bonus track from Shaman (International Version))
8. "Curación (Sunlight On Water)" (new track)
9. "Victory Is Won" (from Shaman)
10. "Come To My World"
11. "Primavera" (re-recorded version with Jerry Rivera on vocals)
