= Get 'Em Up =

Get 'Em Up may refer to:

- Get 'Em Up (Nickelback song), 2014 song from album No Fixed Address
- "Get 'Em Up", song from Rise Up 2010 album by Cypress Hill
