= Song on Fire =

Single by Nickelback

from the album Feed the Machine
- Released: April 28, 2017
- Genre: Rock
- Length: 3:50
- Label: BMG
- Songwriters: C. Kroeger; Peake; Hayley Warner; Steph Jones; Ryan Spraker

Nickelback singles chronology
"Feed the Machine" (2017)	"Song on Fire" (2017)	"Must Be Nice" (2017)

Music video
- "Song on Fire" on YouTube

"Song on Fire" is a song by Canadian rock band Nickelback. It is the second single from their ninth studio album, Feed the Machine. It was released on April 28, 2017.

== Background ==
The song was first revealed with a lyric video on April 27, 2017. The song was released as a single on the next day, April 28. The band later released an official music video on June 12, 2017, four days before the release of Feed the Machine.

== Composition and themes ==
The song has been described as a mid-tempo power ballad. The song opens with somber, clean guitar notes set to a light backing beat and Chad Kroeger's "gritty croon". The song's power builds over the course of the verses and bridge, until the chorus erupts as a "fiery rock anthem". Lyrically, the song has been called "an ode to lost love", containing lyrics such as "The first words that come out/And I can see this song will be about you/I can't believe that I can breathe without you/But all I need to do is carry on". Themes of despair and hopelessness fill the song, with lyrics referring to crying during writing the song lyrics, and the song's title being in reference to setting the lyrics sheet on fire and disposing of the song altogether. Written by band frontman Chad Kroeger, some have speculated that the song may be about his split from ex-wife Avril Lavigne, however Kroeger has denied this.

== Reception ==
Many journalists praised the song for being a more emotional and heart-felt counterpoint to the band's heavy prior single from the album, "Feed the Machine". Loudwire praised that it "toys with emotions, taking listeners from bleak lows to empowering highs by the time the chorus arrives and will undoubtedly be a new live favorite, calling for lighters (and phones) to be held in the air, illuminating the sea of fans packed into arenas and outdoor venues. AXS also praised the song for showing "Kroeger's ability to craft solid hooks and infectious melodies...on full display." Billboard praised how well the song worked with its accompanying music video, calling it "one of their most poignant pieces yet" and concluded that "Although the sounds and complementary imagery are impactful enough, their message goes beyond the characteristically anthemic chorus", specifically citing its ending as a standout part.

== Personnel ==
- Chad Kroeger – lead vocals, guitar
- Ryan Peake – guitar, keyboards
- Mike Kroeger – bass guitar
- Daniel Adair – drums

== Charts ==
Chart (2017)	Peak position
Scottish Singles Sales (Official Charts)	98
Slovakia Airplay (ČNS IFPI)	51
US Hot Rock & Alternative Songs (Billboard)	39
