= Sister Sin (disambiguation) =

Sister Sin is a Swedish heavy metal band.

Sister Sin may also refer to:

- Sin (Marvel Comics), a comic book character also known as Sister Sin
- "Sister Sin", a song by Nickelback from the album No Fixed Address, 2014
