= Feed the Machine (Nickelback song) =

Single by Nickelback

from the album Feed the Machine
- Released: February 1, 2017
- Genre: Alternative metal
- Length: 5:02
- Label: BMG
- Songwriters: Chad Kroeger; Ryan Peake; Mike Kroeger; Daniel Adair
- Producers: Nickelback; Chris Baseford

Nickelback singles chronology
"Dirty Laundry" (2016)	"Feed the Machine" (2017)	"Song on Fire" (2017)

Music video
- "Feed the Machine" on YouTube

"Feed the Machine" is a song by Canadian rock band Nickelback for their ninth studio album of the same name (2017). The band co-produced the track with Chris Baseford. "Feed the Machine" was released to digital retailers February 1, 2017, through BMG Rights Management as the album's lead single and impacted American rock radio on February 7.

== Content ==
"Feed the Machine" is a "defiant rock anthem" with prominent metal-influenced "djenty" guitar riffs and "timely" lyrics about resisting an all-powerful government. Critics have noted the song's style as being both a return to the "heavier" rock sound of their early works and a change of pace from the formulaic music for which they have drawn criticism.

== Critical reception ==
Mike Wass of Idolator gave the single a mixed review, writing that "Feed the Machine" is "honestly not that bad" and "something of a change of pace" for the group. Sam Law of lifestyle blog The Edge rated the song three stars out of five. He praised the song's "surprisingly catchy" guitar work but wrote that ultimately, "the most compelling thing about Nickelback's latest single is that it's not as awful as the rest of their work."

== Chart performance ==
In Canada, "Feed the Machine" failed to enter the Canadian Hot 100 chart, but did reach number 39 on the Digital Songs component chart dated February 25, 2017. The song entered the Canada Rock airplay chart at number 32 for the week of February 18, 2017, and has since reached a peak position of 1 on the chart dated March 25, 2017.

In the United States, "Feed the Machine" debuted at number 42 on the Hot Rock Songs chart dated February 18, 2017. It reached a peak position of 17 on the chart dated February 25, 2017. The song has also peaked at 34 on the Rock Airplay chart and at 14 on the format-specific Mainstream Rock chart.

== Music video ==
The music video was released on April 19, 2017. Set in a dystopian, post-apocalyptic future where machines have imprisoned humans. The music video sees Kroeger and his bandmates depicted as freedom-fighting revolutionaries who free the enslaved humans from their machine captors.

== Charts ==
Chart (2017)	Peak position
Canada Digital Songs (Billboard)	39
Canada Rock (Billboard)	14
US Hot Rock & Alternative Songs (Billboard)	17
US Mainstream Rock Airplay (Billboard)	12

== Release history ==
Country	Date	Format	Label	Ref.
Worldwide	February 1, 2017	Digital download	BMG	
United States	February 7, 2017	Active rock; mainstream rock	BMG	
