= My Darkest Days (album) =

Studio album by My Darkest Days
- Released: September 21, 2010
- Recorded: Abbotsford, British Columbia; (Mountain View Studios)
- Genres: Alternative metal; hard rock; post-grunge
- Length: 39:23
- Label: 604
- Producers: Joey Moi; Chad Kroeger

My Darkest Days chronology
My Darkest Days (2010)	Sick and Twisted Affair (2012)

Singles from My Darkest Days
- 1. "Porn Star Dancing" Released: June 21, 2010; 2. "Move Your Body" Released: January 11, 2011; 3. "Every Lie" Released: February 8, 2011

Professional ratings
Review scores
Source	Rating
AllMusic	3/5 stars

My Darkest Days is the debut album by Canadian rock band My Darkest Days, released on September 21, 2010. The album has sold more than 100,000 copies in the US and more than 20,000 in Canada. The first single, "Porn Star Dancing", spent two weeks at number one the Billboard Mainstream Rock Tracks chart, and peaked at number seven on Billboard's Rock Songs chart.

== Track listing ==
No.	Title	Writer(s)	Length
1.	"Move Your Body"	Matt Walst; Chad Kroeger	3:13
2.	"Porn Star Dancing" (featuring Zakk Wylde and Chad Kroeger)	Walst; Kroeger; Joey Moi; Ted Bruner	3:18
3.	"Every Lie"	Walst; Neil Sanderson; Harry Hess; Casey Marshall	2:56
4.	"Like Nobody Else"	Walst; Kroeger	3:41
5.	"The World Belongs to Me"	Walst; Moi; Kroeger; Kevin Rudolf; Jacob Kasher; Jamaal Sublett; Dustin Moore	3:42
6.	"Save Me"	Walst; Moi; Kroeger	3:41
7.	"Set It on Fire" (featuring Orianthi)	Walst; Moi; Bruner	3:27
8.	"Come Undone" (Duran Duran cover – featuring Jessie James)	Simon Le Bon; Nick Rhodes; John Taylor; Warren Cuccurullo	4:08
9.	"Can't Forget You"	Walst; Kroeger; Marshall; Gavin Brown	3:53
10.	"Goodbye"	Walst; Kroeger; Marshall; Moi	3:59
11.	"Porn Star Dancing" (featuring Chad Kroeger and Ludacris)	Walst; Kroeger; Moi; Bruner	3:25
Total length:			39:23

Best Buy bonus tracks
No.	Title	Writer(s)	Length
12.	"Without You"	Walst; Kroeger	4:22
13.	"Still Worth Fighting For"	Walst; Moi; Kroeger; Gavin Brown; Mitch Allan	3:17
Total length:			47:02

iTunes bonus track
No.	Title	Writer(s)	Length
12.	"Fucked Up Situation"	Walst; Kroeger; Moi; Bruner	3:38
Total length:			43:01

== Personnel ==
Per liner notes

My Darkest Days

- Matt Walst – lead vocals, guitar
- Brendan McMillan – bass guitar
- Doug Oliver – drums

Additional musicians

- Joey Moi – strings, percussion, acoustic guitar, additional vocals
- Zakk Wylde – guitar on "Porn Star Dancing"
- Chad Kroeger – acoustic guitar, percussion, additional vocals on "Porn Star Dancing"
- Scott Cook – additional vocals
- Ludacris – additional vocals on "Porn Star Dancing"

Production

- Joey Moi – producer, engineer
- Brad Townsend – engineer
- Chris Lord-Alge – mixing
- Randy Staub – mixing
- Ted Jensen – mastering
- Toad Russell – art direction

== Charts ==
=== Weekly charts ===
Chart (2010–2011)	Peak position
Canadian Albums Chart	11
US Billboard 200	38
US Billboard Alternative Albums	9
US Billboard Hard Rock Albums	3
US Billboard Rock Albums	12

=== Year-end charts ===
Chart (2010)	Position
US Billboard Hard Rock Albums	18
