= Million Miles an Hour =

Single by Nickelback

from the album No Fixed Address
- Released: November 25, 2014
- Genre: Post-grunge; hard rock; electronic rock
- Length: 4:10
- Label: Republic
- Songwriters: Chad Kroeger; Ryan Peake
- Producers: Nickelback; Chris Baseford

Nickelback singles chronology
"What Are You Waiting For?" (2014)	"Million Miles an Hour" (2014)	"She Keeps Me Up" (2015)

"Million Miles an Hour" is a song recorded by Canadian rock group Nickelback for their eighth studio album, No Fixed Address (2014). Written by band members Chad Kroeger and Ryan Peake, the song was issued to American active rock radio November 25, 2014 as the album's second rock single and third overall single. It was well received at radio, being the most-added song on the format in its release week and debuting at No. 36 on the Billboard Mainstream Rock Tracks chart.

== Composition ==
"Million Miles an Hour" is an uptempo song with a duration of four minutes and ten seconds, and has been described as post-grunge, hard rock and electronic rock. Its instrumentation consists primarily of guitar and "throbbing" synths, while the vocals are layered and distorted to sound as though they are coming from underwater. Deviating from the post-grunge sound for which the band is known, "Million Miles an Hour" is one of the more electronic-influenced tracks on No Fixed Address.

According to Kroeger, the song's lyrics are about tripping on LSD.

== Chart performance ==
"Million Miles an Hour" debuted at number 36 on the Billboard Mainstream Rock Tracks airplay chart for the week ending December 6, 2014. It also debuted at number 48 on the Billboard Rock Airplay chart for the week ending December 27, 2014.

Chart (2014–2015)	Peak position
Canada Rock (Billboard)	40
US Rock & Alternative Airplay (Billboard)	34
US Mainstream Rock (Billboard)	11
