= Get 'Em Up (Nickelback song) =

Single by Nickelback

from the album No Fixed Address
- Released: May 5, 2015
- Recorded: 2014
- Genre: Hard rock
- Length: 3:53
- Label: Republic
- Songwriter: Chad Kroeger
- Producers: Nickelback; Chris Baseford

Nickelback singles chronology
"Satellite" (2015)	"Get 'Em Up" (2015)	"Dirty Laundry" (2016)

Music video
- "Get 'Em Up" on YouTube

"Get 'Em Up" is a song by Canadian rock band Nickelback released as the seventh and final single from their eighth studio album, No Fixed Address, on May 5, 2015. Written by lead vocalist Chad Kroeger, the track departs from the pop experimentation on much of the album. Instead, it features a hard rock sound more typical of the band, albeit with country and Southern rock influences. The song was initially released digitally as a promotional single on November 4, 2014.

== Critical reception ==
Jeremy Thomas of 411 Mania complimented the band's use of humour in the song, writing that the track "has the same feel as "Animals," one of their better tracks, and that allows it to stand out." Mikael Wood of Los Angeles Times similarly wrote that "Get 'Em Up" is one of two tracks on the album that "show off Kroeger's flair for dialogue," which he added is "as funny and specific as high-level sitcom writing." Kerrang! described the track as "the best song about erectile dysfunction (we think) ever written."

== Music video ==
The music video was directed by Nigel Dick and was released on June 25, 2015. It features a bank robbery gone wrong, with the main character portrayed as an antihero. The video's story is continued in the music video for "Satellite", released the same day.

== Charts ==
Chart (2015)	Peak position
US Mainstream Rock (Billboard)	40

== Release history ==
Country	Date	Format	Label	Ref.
Worldwide	November 4, 2014	Digital download	Republic; Universal	
United States	May 5, 2015	Rock radio	Republic	
