= This Boy's Fire =

Single by Santana featuring Jennifer Lopez and Baby Bash

from the album Ultimate Santana
- Released: April 2008
- Studio: Icon Sound Studios (Miami, FL)
- Length: 3:30 (Album version); 3:00 (No rap version)
- Label: Arista, RMG
- Songwriters: Steve Morales, Raymond Diaz, Sean Garrett, Ronald Bryant
- Producers: Steve Morales, Raymond Diaz, Sean Garrett, Cory Rooney, Dr. Luke

Santana singles chronology
"Into the Night" (2007)	"This Boy's Fire" (2008)	"Dar um Jeito (We Will Find a Way)" (2014)

Jennifer Lopez singles chronology
"Hold It Don't Drop It" (2007)	"This Boy's Fire" (2008)	"Louboutins" (2009)

Audio video
- "This Boy's Fire" on YouTube

"This Boy's Fire" is a song by American rock band Santana featuring vocals from American recording artists Jennifer Lopez & Baby Bash. The song was released as the second single from the band's compilation album Ultimate Santana (2007).

== Background ==
The collaboration between Carlos Santana and Lopez was first announced in September 2007. According to Contactmusic, it turned out "so good" which is why it was added to the final track listing of Ultimate Santana. Mexican rapper Baby Bash also features on the song, performing a rap verse.

== Reception ==
Monsters and Critics called the song "red hot" while Stephen Thomas Erlewine noted that is "a dance number where Santana seems incidental."

== Charts ==
Chart (2008)	Peak position
Romania (Romanian Top 100)	28
Russia (Tophit Weekly General Airplay)	146
Slovakia (Radio Top 100)	64

== Release history ==
Release dates and formats for "This Boy's Fire"
Region	Date	Format	Label	Ref.
Russia	December 24, 2007	Contemporary hit radio	Sony BMG	
United States	April 13, 2008	Rhythmic radio	Arista	
United States	April 22, 2008	Mainstream airplay	Arista	
