= Casual Sex (song) =

Single by My Darkest Days

from the album Sick and Twisted Affair
- Released: January 13, 2012
- Genre: Hard rock; post-grunge
- Length: 3:16
- Label: 604
- Songwriters: Matt Walst; Ted Bruner; Joey Moi
- Producer: Joey Moi

My Darkest Days singles chronology
"Every Lie" (2011)	"Casual Sex" (2012)	"Sick and Twisted Affair" (2012)

"Casual Sex" is a song by Canadian rock band My Darkest Days. It was released on January 13, 2012, as the lead single from the band's second studio album, Sick and Twisted Affair. The song features John 5 on guitar.

There are two different versions of the music video for this song. In one version, the women are undressed; in the alternate version, they are censored. The video features pornographic actors Ron Jeremy and Sabrina Maree.

The band revealed in an interview that the excessive nudity and promiscuity of the shoot caused tension between them and their respective significant others. Matt Walst's girlfriend left him, while both Brendan McMillan and Doug Oliver dealt with turbulence in their romantic relationships. In another interview, Reid Henry admitted to fraternizing with a young lady in the video, who remained unnamed. Later photos and tweets revealed the model involved to be Penthouse Pet and Hustler model Sabrina Maree.

== Charts ==
Chart (2012)	Peak position
U.S. Billboard Hot Mainstream Rock Tracks	22
U.S. Billboard Rock Songs	46
