= My Darkest Days =

Canadian rock band (2005–2013)

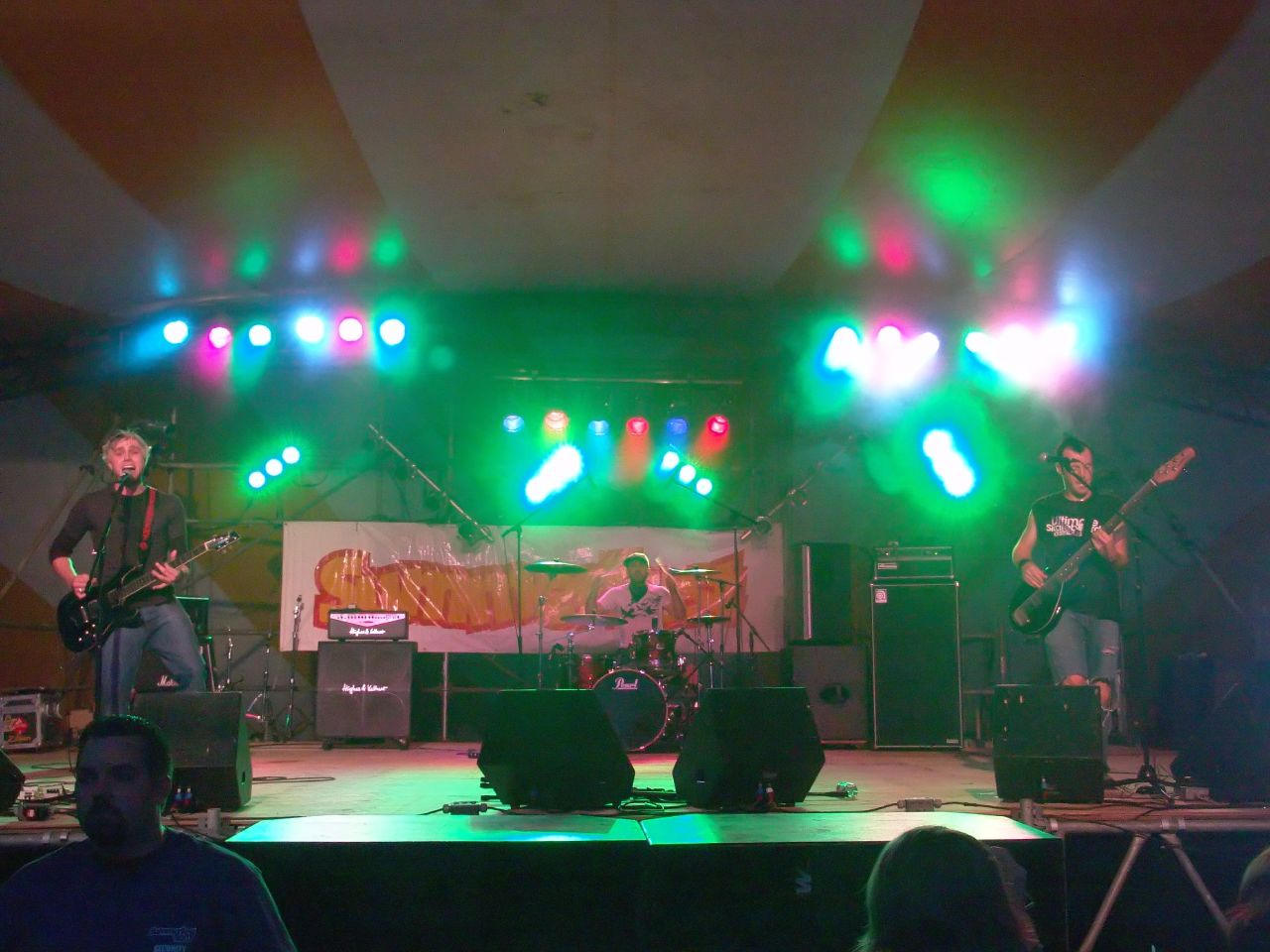
- My Darkest Days performing in 2007

Background information
- Also known as: MDD
- Origin: Peterborough, Ontario, Canada
- Genres: Hard rock; post-grunge; alternative metal
- Years active: 2005–2013
- Labels: 604; Mercury
- Past members: Matt Walst; Reid Henry; Brendan McMillan; Doug Oliver; Chris McMillan; Paulo Neta; Sal Costa
- Website: mydarkestdays.com

My Darkest Days was a Canadian rock band based in Peterborough, Ontario, consisting of lead vocalist Matt Walst, bassist Brendan McMillan, drummer Doug Oliver, guitarist Sal Costa, and keyboardist Reid Henry. They were discovered by Chad Kroeger of Nickelback, who signed them to his record label, 604 Records. They are best known for their 2010 single "Porn Star Dancing".

In June 2010 the band went on tour with Sick Puppies, Janus, and It's Alive, and shot the video for "Porn Star Dancing" in Las Vegas. In August 2010, they toured with Trapt, Skillet, and Papa Roach. Chad Kroeger appears and sings in the "Porn Star Dancing" video, as does American rapper Ludacris (in the extended version only) and Black Label Society frontman Zakk Wylde, playing lead guitar for the single.

The band disbanded in 2013 after Matt Walst became the lead vocalist of Three Days Grace, which also features his older brother Brad.

The band cited Nirvana, A Perfect Circle, and Nickelback as influences.

== History ==
=== Early years ===
The band was founded by Matt Walst in 2005, who was born in Norwood, Ontario, and whose older brother, Brad Walst, is the bassist for Canadian rock band, Three Days Grace. Instead of playing in his brother's band, Walst decided to form one of his own with his friends Brendan McMillan on bass guitar, Doug Oliver on drums, and Chris McMillan on lead guitar. Chris McMillan left the band and became an electrician being replaced by Paulo Neta. In 2009, a friend introduced Walst to Toronto-based singer/guitarist Sal Costa, who later became the band's guitarist, replacing Paulo Neta, who became the guitarist for Thornley and eventually Big Wreck. My Darkest Days opened for many bands, including Three Days Grace, Default, Theory of a Deadman, Skillet, Papa Roach, Nickelback, and Hinder.

My Darkest Days won a contest called Rock Search put on by 97.7 HTZ FM in St. Catharines, Ontario in 2008 with "Every Lie". This gave them time in a recording studio publicity in Niagara, Ontario. It gave the band money to tour for a year as well.

=== Debut album (2009–2011) ===
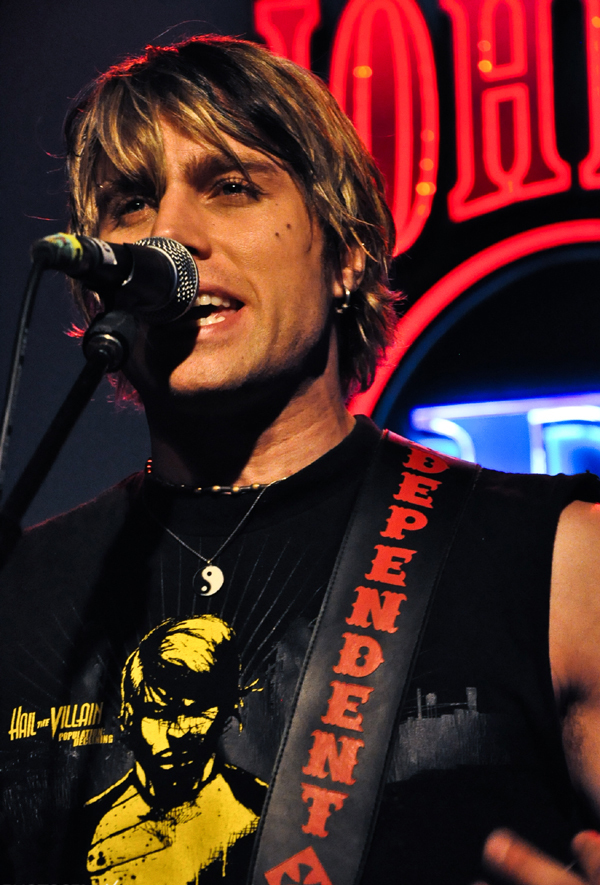
Matt Walst live, 2009

When Chad Kroeger heard My Darkest Days' music, he was so impressed he immediately signed them to his record label. Matt Walst gave Chad Kroeger their demo while touring together. The first song they wrote after being signed was "Porn Star Dancing", which became their first single. Kroeger decided he wanted to be featured on it, along with a friend of his, Zakk Wylde, lead vocalist and lead guitarist for Black Label Society and a former guitarist for Ozzy Osbourne. Kroeger and Wylde both appear in the video, which was filmed at the Hard Rock Las Vegas Vanity nightclub. A remix of the single was also released which featured Atlanta rapper Ludacris. On their official Facebook page, My Darkest Days announced their debut self-titled album was to be released on September 21, 2010. On the album, the song "Set It on Fire" features Australian singer/guitarist Orianthi on lead guitar, known from her work with Steve Vai, Carlos Santana, and Michael Jackson. Also on the album is a collaboration with country-pop singer Jessie James, on the Duran Duran cover "Come Undone".

The Saw 3D soundtrack released on October 26, 2010, features the song "The World Belongs to Me".

My Darkest Days was named the "Best New Band of 2010" by hardDriveXL after hitting the No. 1 spot on Billboard's Hot Mainstream Rock Tracks ranking, as well as No. 1 on FMQB's Active Rock list.

My Darkest Days' first major-label single, "Porn Star Dancing", went gold in Canada and in the United States.

In March 2011, My Darkest Days was involved in a bus accident where their Bandwagon RV style bus flipped and fell into a ditch in rural Idaho. No major injuries were incurred, but drummer Doug Oliver suffered a sprained ankle and the band missed one tour date in Boise with Three Days Grace. It was announced on their Facebook page that they will be entering the studio in October 2011 with Joey Moi of Mountain View Records to start writing new material for their next album.

=== Sick and Twisted Affair (2012) ===
The lead single from their second studio album, "Casual Sex", was released to iTunes on January 17, 2012, and was sent to Canadian rock radios on January 13, 2012. Their second album, Sick and Twisted Affair, was released on March 26, 2012. It features the singles, "Casual Sex" and "Sick And Twisted Affair". My Darkest Days went on tour with Nickelback, Bush, and Seether in April 2012. They were a part of Nickelback's Here and Now 2012 World Tour. "Save Yourself", taken from Sick and Twisted Affair, was featured on the soundtrack for the hockey video game NHL 13. Costa departed from the band in early 2013.

=== Three Days Grace and side projects (2013–present) ===
Following frontman Adam Gontier's departure from Three Days Grace in 2013, Matt Walst was brought on as their replacement lead vocalist for their tour, and was later made the permanent lead singer of the band. In October 2024, Gontier returned back to Three Days Grace as lead vocalist after an eleven-year absence, with Walst also retaining his role as vocalist, making the band a dual-vocalist band. The band released its eighth studio album Alienation on August 22, 2025, which is the first album as a dual-vocalist band and with Gontier since his return to the band.

Former guitarist Sal Costa formed and fronted the band Smashing Satellites in 2014. Since then, the band has released two EPs and a full album and standalone single as of 2016.

While Walst has been busy with Three Days Grace, MDD bandmates started up side projects of their own. In 2013, Doug Oliver started Cold Creek County, a country music group, with Brandon Scott out of Brighton, Ontario. Reid Henry & Brendan McMillan started a band called "Deadset Society" touring across the US. Their song "Like a Nightmare" reached number 2 on SXM Octane channel and US/Canadian terrestrial Active Rock stations.

In May 2019, following a split in the band, three members of Deadset Society released three singles under a new band name "Tense Machine". The lineup features Dane Hartsell on lead vocals and guitar, Brendan McMillan on bass and Mike Langford on drums and production. Their first single "Best Mistake" reached top 50 at US Active Rock Radio and has over 250,000 streams. In May 2020, the band released a full-length album titled "Echoes", with close to one million online streams.

In June 2020, Reid Henry launched a solo project with his debut single "Monster" (co-written by Brendan McMillan) garnering US Active Rock radio play and hundreds of thousands of streams worldwide. In December 2020, Reid launched his second solo single, "The Blind".

Despite My Darkest Days' extended hiatus, their official social media accounts still remain active.

== Band members ==
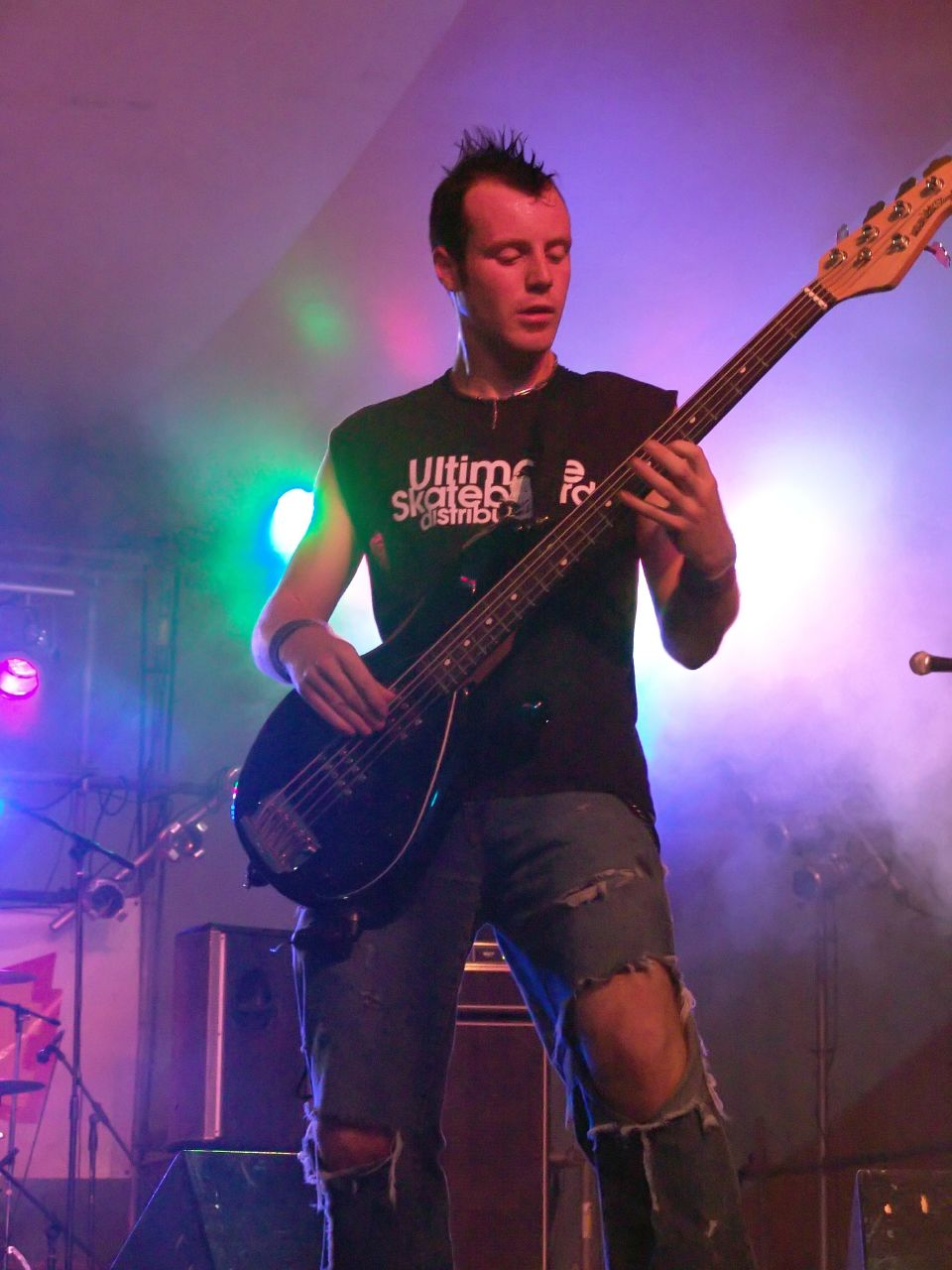
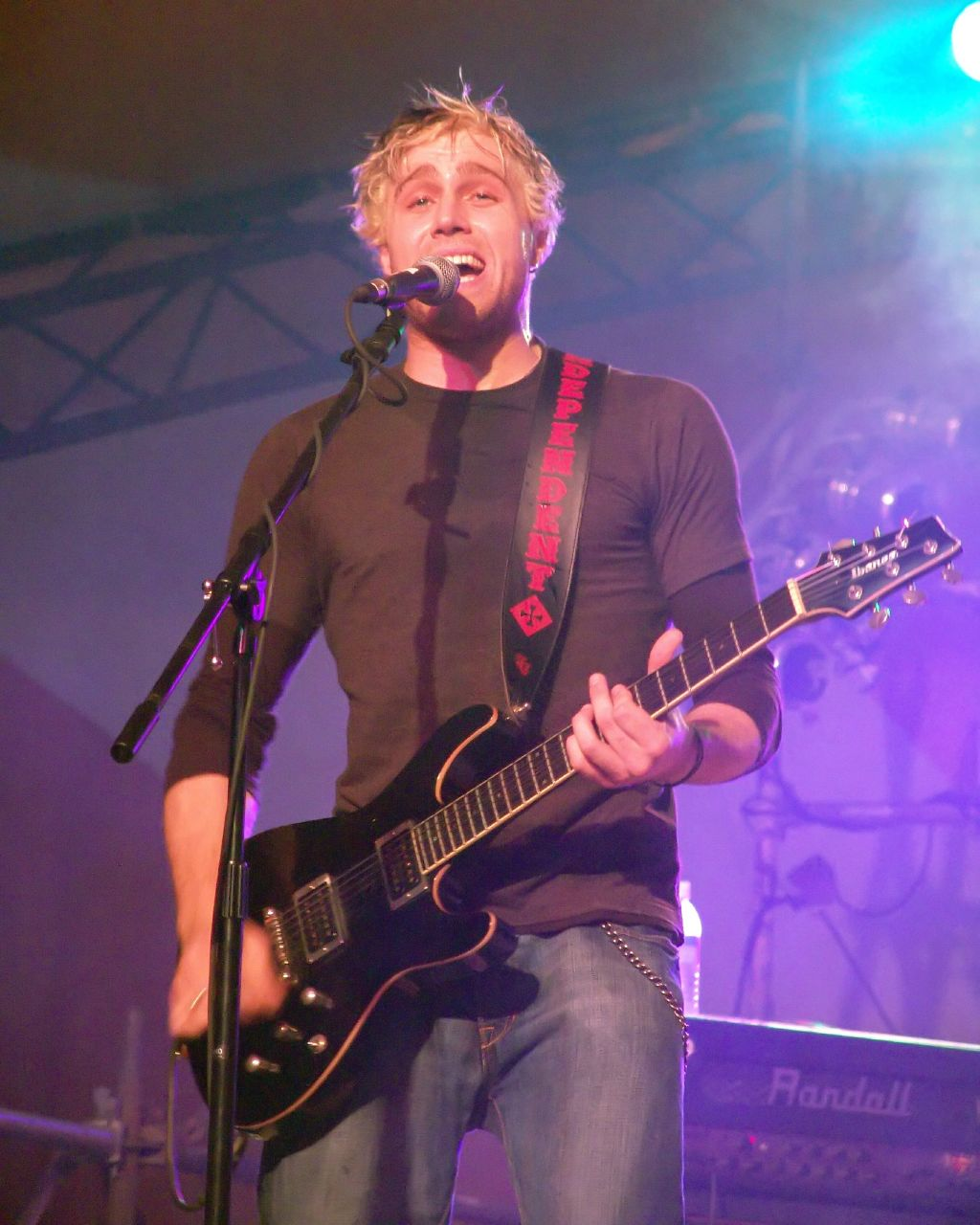
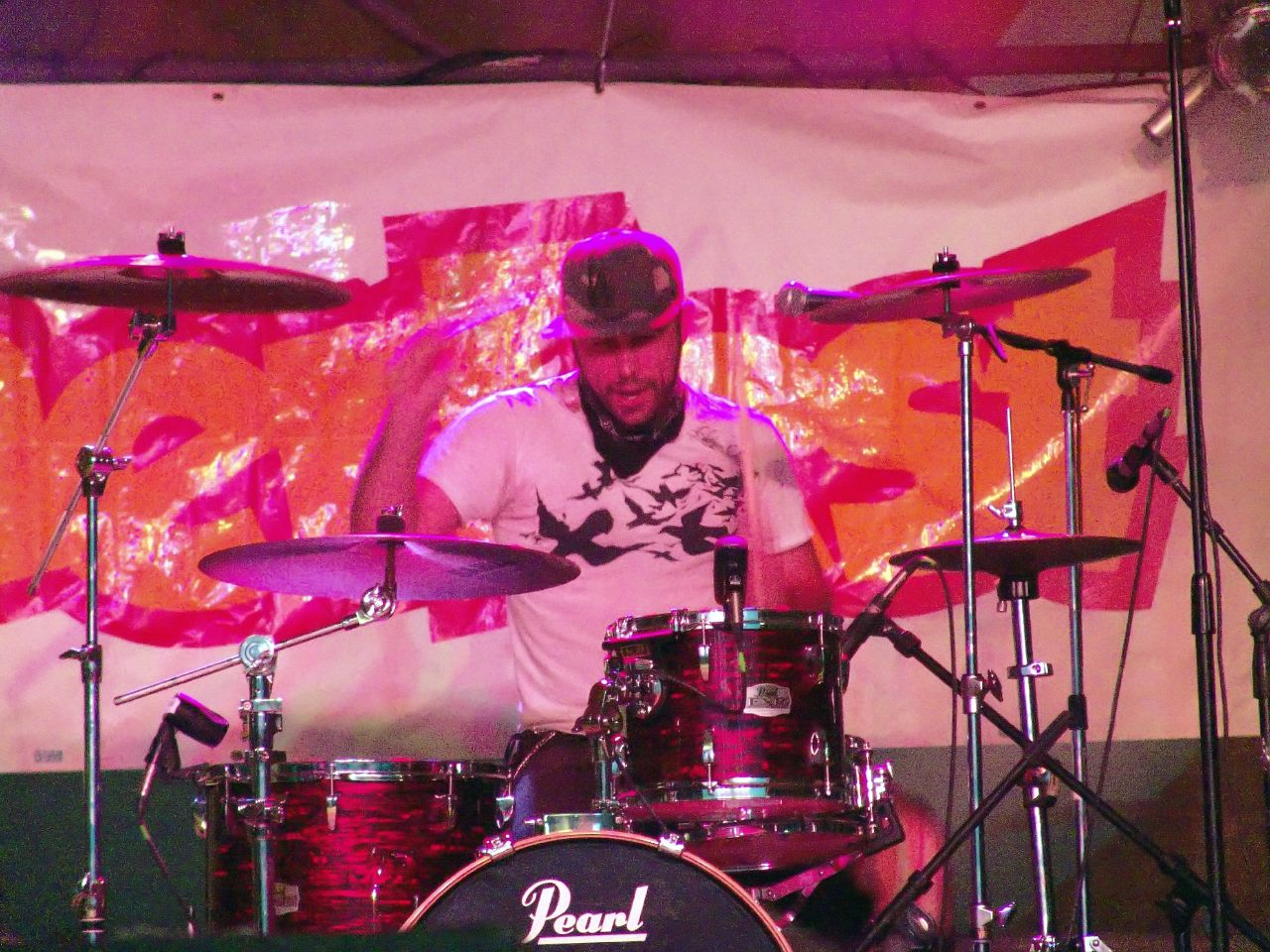
The band performing at Sudbury Summerfest 2007

Final lineup

- Matt Walst – lead vocals, guitar (2005–2013)
- Reid Henry – keyboards, backing vocals, guitar (2010–2013)
- Brendan McMillan – bass, backing vocals (2005–2013)
- Doug Oliver – drums, percussion (2005–2013)

Former

- Sal Costa – lead guitar, backing vocals (2010–2012)
- Chris McMillan – lead guitar, backing vocals (2005–2007)
- Paulo Neta – lead guitar, vocals (2008–2009)

== Discography ==
=== Studio albums ===
Title	Details	Peak chart positions			
Title	Details	CAN	US	US Alt	US Rock
My Darkest Days	Released: September 21, 2010; Label: 604; Formats: CD, digital download	11	38	9	12
Sick and Twisted Affair	Released: March 26, 2012; Label: 604; Formats: CD, digital download	29	29	9	11

=== Singles ===
Year	Single	Peak chart positions						Certifications	Album
Year	Single	CAN	AUS	US	US Alt	US Main	US Rock	Certifications	Album
2010	"Porn Star Dancing" (featuring Zakk Wylde and Chad Kroeger)	40	— (Note: "Porn Star Dancing" did not enter the ARIA Singles Chart, but peaked at number 15 on the ARIA Hitseekers Chart.)	90	21	1	7	MC: Platinum; RIAA: Gold	My Darkest Days
2011	"Move Your Body"	—	—	—	—	23	—		My Darkest Days
2011	"Every Lie"	—	—	—	—	24	—		My Darkest Days
2012	"Casual Sex"	—	—	—	—	22	46		Sick and Twisted Affair
2012	"Sick and Twisted Affair"	—	—	—	—	37	—		Sick and Twisted Affair
"—" denotes releases that did not chart

== Awards and nominations ==
Year	Presenter	Award	Result
2011	Juno Awards of 2011	New Group of the Year	Nominated
