= Porn Star Dancing =

Single by My Darkest Days featuring Chad Kroeger, Ludacris and Zakk Wylde

from the album My Darkest Days
- Released: June 21, 2010
- Genre: Hard rock; glam metal; rap rock; dirty rap; post-grunge
- Length: 3:55
- Label: 604
- Songwriters: Matt Walst; Chad Kroeger; Joey Moi; Ted Bruner
- Producers: Joey Moi; Chad Kroeger

My Darkest Days singles chronology
"Porn Star Dancing" (2010)	"Move Your Body" (2011)

Chad Kroeger singles chronology
"Into the Night" (2007)	"Porn Star Dancing" (2010)	"Let Me Go" (2013)

Ludacris singles chronology
"Sex Room" (2010)	"Porn Star Dancing" (2010)	"I Like" (2010)

Music video
- "Porn Star Dancing" on YouTube

"Porn Star Dancing" is the debut single by the Canadian rock band My Darkest Days from their self-titled debut album released on September 21, 2010. The single itself was released on June 21, 2010, preceding the release of the album by three months. The song spent 26 weeks on Billboard's Rock Songs chart where, on December 11, 2010, it peaked at number seven. On the Billboard Mainstream Rock Tracks chart, it spent two weeks at number one. Chad Kroeger of Nickelback sings a verse in the "Porn Star Dancing" video, which was filmed at the Hard Rock Hotel and Casino in Las Vegas, as does American rapper Ludacris, and Black Label Society frontman Zakk Wylde does a guitar solo.

== Music video ==
The music video was directed by Brendan Cochrane. Ludacris was originally featured only in the Canadian release of the video; however, due to the popularity of the track, it was subsequently adopted as the mainstream video and radio release.

== Charts ==
Chart (2010–2011)	Peak position
Australia Hitseekers (ARIA)	15
Canada Hot 100 (Billboard)	40
Canada CHR/Top 40 (Billboard)	39
Canada Rock (Billboard)	3
South Korea International Chart (GAON)	134
US Billboard Hot 100	90
US Hot Rock & Alternative Songs (Billboard)	7

=== Year-end charts ===
Chart (2011)	Position
US Hot Rock Songs (Billboard)	42

== Certifications ==
Region	Certification	Certified units/sales
Canada (Music Canada)	3× Platinum	240,000^{‡}
United States (RIAA)	Gold	500,000^{*}
^{*} Sales figures based on certification alone.^{‡} Sales+streaming figures based on certification alone.
