= Feed the Machine =

Studio album by Nickelback
- Released: June 16, 2017
- Recorded: June–October 2016
- Genre: Post-grunge; hard rock; alternative metal
- Length: 43:04
- Label: BMG
- Producer: Nickelback; Chris Baseford

Nickelback chronology
No Fixed Address (2014)	Feed the Machine (2017)	Get Rollin' (2022)

Singles from Feed the Machine
- 1. "Feed the Machine" Released: February 1, 2017; 2. "Song on Fire" Released: April 28, 2017; 3. "Must Be Nice" Released: June 2, 2017; 4. "After the Rain" Released: October 22, 2017

Professional ratings
Review scores
Source	Rating
AllMusic	3/5 stars
Wall of Sound	7/10

Feed the Machine is the ninth studio album by Canadian rock band Nickelback, and was released on June 16, 2017. It is the band's first release through record label BMG. Feed the Machine debuted at number five on the US Billboard 200 with 47,000 album-equivalent units.

== Background ==
Following the release of their prior album, No Fixed Address, in 2014, the band cancelled the majority of their touring due to Chad Kroeger needing to have surgery to remove a cyst in his vocal cord. The band subsequently became bogged down in legal battles related to the cancellation of the tour.

The album was released on June 16, 2017. Shortly after its release, the band began a 44-city tour on June 23, 2017, in North America, co-headlined with Daughtry, Shaman's Harvest and Cheap Trick as supporting acts.

== Promotion and release ==
The album's first single, "Feed the Machine" was released on February 1, 2017. The second single, "Song on Fire", was released on April 28, 2017. On June 2, 2017, Nickelback made the song "Must Be Nice" available on their YouTube channel and gave it away to those who had pre-ordered the album. "Must Be Nice" was released to American rock radio stations on June 6, 2017, as the album's third official single and second rock single.

== Commercial performance ==
Feed the Machine debuted at number five on the US Billboard 200 with 47,000 album-equivalent units, of which 43,000 were pure album sales. It debuted at number three in the UK, becoming their highest-debuting album of their career in that country. Later, it has been certified Silver by the BPI for sales in excess of 60,000 copies.

== Track listing ==
Feed the Machine track listing
No.	Title	Writer(s)	Length
1.	"Feed the Machine"	Chad Kroeger; Ryan Peake; Mike Kroeger; Daniel Adair	5:02
2.	"Coin for the Ferryman"	C. Kroeger	4:50
3.	"Song on Fire"	C. Kroeger; Peake; Hayley Warner; Steph Jones; Ryan Spraker	3:50
4.	"Must Be Nice"	C. Kroeger	3:42
5.	"After the Rain"	C. Kroeger; Ali Tamposi	3:34
6.	"For the River"	C. Kroeger	3:28
7.	"Home"	C. Kroeger	3:52
8.	"The Betrayal (Act III)"	C. Kroeger; Peake; Daniel Adair	4:20
9.	"Silent Majority"	C. Kroeger; Peake	3:52
10.	"Every Time We're Together"	C. Kroeger; Joe Nichols	3:52
11.	"The Betrayal (Act I)" (instrumental)	Peake	2:42
Total length:			43:04

== Personnel ==
Nickelback

- Chad Kroeger – lead vocals, guitar
- Ryan Peake – guitar, keyboards, backing vocals
- Mike Kroeger – bass guitar
- Daniel Adair – drums, backing vocals

Other musicians

- Nuno Bettencourt – guitar solo on "For the River"

Production

- Chris Baseford – production, mixing (2, 3, 6, 9, 11)
- Chris Lord-Alge – mixing (1, 5, 7, 10)
- Randy Staub – mixing (4, 8)
- Ted Jensen – mastering

== Charts ==
=== Weekly charts ===
Weekly chart performance for Feed the Machine
Chart (2017)	Peak position
Australian Albums (ARIA)	3
Austrian Albums (Ö3 Austria)	4
Belgian Albums (Ultratop Flanders)	16
Belgian Albums (Ultratop Wallonia)	43
Canadian Albums (Billboard)	2
Czech Albums (ČNS IFPI)	7
Danish Albums (Hitlisten)	21
Dutch Albums (Album Top 100)	16
Finnish Albums (Suomen virallinen lista)	18
French Albums (SNEP)	85
German Albums (Offizielle Top 100)	6
Hungarian Albums (MAHASZ)	25
Irish Albums (IRMA)	57
Italian Albums (FIMI)	12
Japanese Albums (Oricon)	14
New Zealand Albums (RMNZ)	4
Norwegian Albums (VG-lista)	10
Polish Albums (ZPAV)	18
Scottish Albums (OCC)	3
South African Albums (RSG)	18
Spanish Albums (PROMUSICAE)	32
Swedish Albums (Sverigetopplistan)	6
Swiss Albums (Schweizer Hitparade)	2
UK Albums (OCC)	3
UK Rock & Metal Albums (OCC)	2
US Billboard 200	5
US Independent Albums (Billboard)	2
US Top Alternative Albums (Billboard)	2
US Top Hard Rock Albums (Billboard)	1
US Top Rock Albums (Billboard)	2

=== Year-end charts ===
Year-end chart performance for Feed the Machine
Chart (2017)	Position
Australian Albums (ARIA)	57
Swiss Albums (Schweizer Hitparade)	48
US Top Rock Albums (Billboard)	51

== Certifications ==
Certifications for Feed the Machine
Region	Certification	Certified units/sales
United Kingdom (BPI)	Silver	60,000^{‡}
^{‡} Sales+streaming figures based on certification alone.
