= I'm Feeling You =

Single by Santana featuring Michelle Branch & The Wreckers (Jessica Harp)

from the album All That I Am
- Released: October 20, 2005 (US)
- Genre: Blues rock
- Length: 4:12 (Album version); 4:09 (Radio edit)
- Label: Arista, Maverick
- Songwriters: Kara DioGuardi, John Shanks, Michelle Branch
- Producers: John Shanks, Kara DioGuardi

Santana singles chronology
"Why Don't You & I" (2004)	"I'm Feeling You" (2005)	"Just Feel Better" (2006)

Michelle Branch singles chronology
"'Til I Get Over You" (2004)	"I'm Feeling You" (2005)	"Sooner or Later" (2009)

The Wreckers singles chronology
"The Good Kind" (2005)	"I'm Feeling You" (2005)	"Leave the Pieces" (2006)

"I'm Feeling You" is a song recorded by Santana with The Wreckers (Michelle Branch and Jessica Harp) for Santana's 2005 album All That I Am. The song was written and produced by Kara DioGuardi and John Shanks, with Branch credited as a co-writer. "I'm Feeling You" was Santana's second collaboration with Branch, the first being "The Game of Love" (2002).

An accompanying music video directed by The Malloys showed Branch and Carlos Santana singing onstage of a party, with Jessica Harp singing background. The single reached number fifty-five on the U.S. Billboard Hot 100 and performed best on adult contemporary radio formats, reaching numbers five and six on the Billboard Adult Contemporary and Adult Top 40 charts, respectively.

== Background ==
On a message posted to her message board on 6 December 2005, Branch expresses her dissatisfaction with being associated with the record. She asserts that she was "pressured" by her record company, Maverick Records, to sing on the track, with Jessica Harp being similarly pushed into it so that Maverick could promote Branch and Harp's country music duo, The Wreckers. Branch also claims that she did not do any writing for the song, asserting that her name in the writing credits was used by John Shanks as a "bargaining tool."

== Critical reception ==
David Browne of Entertainment Weekly described parent album All That I Am as "stupendously pedestrian" in the outlet's review of the album and described "I'm Feeling You" specifically as "desperate-housewife pop." Mark Kemp of Paste similarly derided the "messy" formula of the album, and wrote that listeners "won't be feelin' the first single, a gooey pop duet with Michelle Branch called "I'm Feeling You.""

== Charts ==
=== Weekly charts ===
Chart (2005)	Peak position
Canada AC Top 30 (Radio & Records)	5
Canada Hot AC Top 30 (Radio & Records)	7
US Billboard Hot 100	55
US Adult Contemporary (Billboard)	5
US Adult Pop Airplay (Billboard)	6

=== Year-end charts ===
Chart (2006)	Position
US Adult Contemporary Songs (Billboard)	18
