= Hero (Chad Kroeger song) =

2002 single by Chad Kroeger and Josey Scott

- CD single cover

Single by Chad Kroeger featuring Josey Scott

from the album Music from and Inspired by Spider-Man
- B-side: "Invisible Man" by Theory of a Deadman
- Released: March 1, 2002
- Recorded: March 2001
- Genre: Post-grunge; alternative rock
- Length: 3:20 (with orchestral background); 3:09 (with strings omitted)
- Label: Roadrunner; Sony
- Songwriter: Chad Kroeger
- Producer: Chad Kroeger

Chad Kroeger singles chronology
"Hero" (2002)	"Why Don't You & I" (2003)

Alternative cover
- Digital cover

"Hero" is a song by Canadian musician Chad Kroeger (lead vocalist of Nickelback) and American musician Josey Scott (then lead vocalist of Saliva) for the soundtrack to the 2002 superhero film Spider-Man. It was written by Kroeger and recorded specifically for the film. "Hero" was released through Roadrunner Records on March 1, 2002, as the soundtrack's lead single. The song serves as Kroeger's debut solo release.

There are two widely-available versions of the song: one with an orchestral background and one without. Mike Kroeger (bassist of Nickelback), Tyler Connolly (lead singer/guitarist of Theory of a Deadman), and Matt Cameron (drummer of Soundgarden and Pearl Jam) appear on the recording. In addition to its digital release, "Hero" was distributed internationally in various CD single and maxi single formats. Theory of a Deadman's "Invisible Man" was included on many of these releases.

"Hero" experienced worldwide commercial success, peaking in the top 10 of record charts in Austria, Canada, Denmark, Germany, Ireland, New Zealand, Sweden, Switzerland, the United Kingdom, and the United States. The song also topped the US Billboard Mainstream Rock Tracks and Modern Rock Tracks airplay charts. It was nominated for Best Song Written for a Motion Picture, Television or Other Visual Media, Best Rock Performance by a Duo or Group with Vocal, and Best Rock Song at the 45th Grammy Awards (2003).

== Background ==
The song was the result of a collaboration between Chad Kroeger and Josey Scott. Scott told Yahoo!'s entertainment news service Launch, "(Kroeger) had the idea for the song 'Hero', so I came up to Vancouver and met him. He pitched me the idea, and I thought that was pretty dope. Real dope. So we sort of tweaked it, together, laid down some harmonies on it, and played everything from congas to acoustics on it."

Matt Cameron, who played drums on the recording, did not appear in the music video and cited "family issues" as the reason. Our Lady Peace drummer Jeremy Taggart appeared in his place, performing along to Cameron's drum track.

Alice in Chains guitarist Jerry Cantrell was originally picked to play the guitar solo, later played by Tyler Connolly,, but he pulled out. He did, however, contribute to the Spider-Man soundtrack with the song "She Was My Girl", from his solo album Degradation Trip.

== Music video ==
The music video consists of the group, except for Matt Cameron, performing on a building's rooftop purportedly in New York City, with footage of the film Spider-Man spliced in between, and was directed by Nigel Dick. It was filmed in Vancouver, British Columbia on March 24, 2002, and premiered on March 28.

The song won Best Video from a Film at the 2002 MTV Video Music Awards.

== Critical reception and legacy ==
Reviewing the song for NME, Imran Ahmed was critical of Kroeger's "predictability" and drew a strong comparison to "How You Remind Me", Nickelback's 2001 international breakthrough, calling the formula for both "commercial grunge + MOR sensibility = Nu-MOR hit". In 2024, the staff of Consequence included the song in their list of "50 Kick-Butt Post-Grunge Songs We Can Get Behind".

== Chart performance ==
The song was a cross-genre hit in mid-2002, peaking at number one on the Billboard Modern Rock and Mainstream Rock charts, number three on the Billboard Hot 100, and also winning considerable airplay at pop radio, peaking at number two and five, respectively, on the Mainstream Top 40 and Adult Top 40 charts.

== Track listings ==
Digital download (single)
No.	Title	Writer(s)	Length
1.	"Hero"	Chad Kroeger; Josey Scott; Tyler Connolly	3:20

Digital download (album version)
No.	Title	Writer(s)	Length
1.	"Hero" (motion picture version)	Kroeger; Scott; Connolly	3:19

CD single
No.	Title	Writer(s)	Length
1.	"Hero" (motion picture version)	Kroeger; Scott; Connolly	3:19
2.	"Hero" (radio version)	Kroeger; Scott; Connolly	3:09
3.	"Invisible Man"	Kroeger; Connolly	2:40
Total length:			9:08

== Personnel ==
- Chad Kroeger of Nickelback – rhythm guitar, vocals
- Josey Scott of Saliva – acoustic guitar, vocals
- Tyler Connolly of Theory of a Deadman – lead guitar
- Mike Kroeger of Nickelback – bass guitar
- Matt Cameron of Pearl Jam and Soundgarden – drums
- Brian Larson of VSO – violin, string quartet leader

== Charts ==
=== Weekly charts ===
Weekly chart performance for "Hero"
Chart (2002)	Peak position
Australia (ARIA)	17
Austria (Ö3 Austria Top 40)	8
Belgium (Ultratop 50 Flanders)	26
Belgium (Ultratop 50 Wallonia)	19
Canada (Nielsen SoundScan)	1
Croatia (HRT)	8
Denmark (Tracklisten)	3
Europe (Eurochart Hot 100)	8
European Radio Top 50 (Music & Media)	8
France (SNEP)	27
Germany (GfK)	8
Ireland (IRMA)	2
Italy (FIMI)	11
Netherlands (Dutch Top 40)	22
Netherlands (Single Top 100)	34
New Zealand (Recorded Music NZ)	10
Poland (PiF PaF)	2
Portugal (AFP)	2
Romania (Romanian Top 100)	19
Scottish Singles Sales (Official Charts)	4
Sweden (Sverigetopplistan)	7
Switzerland (Schweizer Hitparade)	8
UK Singles (Official Charts)	4
UK Independent (Official Charts)	11
UK Rock & Metal (Official Charts)	1
US Billboard Hot 100	3
US Adult Pop Airplay (Billboard)	5
US Alternative Airplay (Billboard)	1
US Mainstream Rock Airplay (Billboard)	1
US Pop Airplay (Billboard)	2

=== Year-end charts ===
Year-end chart performance for "Hero"
Chart (2002)	Position
Australia (ARIA)	83
Austria (Ö3 Austria Top 40)	47
Belgium (Ultratop 50 Flanders)	79
Belgium (Ultratop 50 Wallonia)	72
Brazil (Crowley)	39
Canada Radio (Nielsen Soundscan)	5
Canada (Nielsen SoundScan)	8
Europe (Eurochart Hot 100)	60
Germany (Media Control)	50
Ireland (IRMA)	16
Sweden (Hitlistan)	43
Switzerland (Schweizer Hitparade)	52
UK Singles (OCC)	39
UK Airplay (Music Week)	67
US Billboard Hot 100	25
US Adult Top 40 (Billboard)	19
US Mainstream Rock Tracks (Billboard)	12
US Mainstream Top 40 (Billboard)	16
US Modern Rock Tracks (Billboard)	21
US Top 40 Tracks (Billboard)	21

== Certifications ==
Certifications and sales for "Hero"
Region	Certification	Certified units/sales
Australia (ARIA)	Gold	35,000^{^}
New Zealand (RMNZ)	Gold	15,000^{‡}
United Kingdom (BPI)	Gold	400,000^{‡}
^{^} Shipments figures based on certification alone.^{‡} Sales+streaming figures based on certification alone.

== Release history ==
Release dates and formats for "Hero"
Region	Date	Format(s)	Label(s)	Ref.
Worldwide	March 1, 2002	Digital download	Roadrunner	
United States	April 15, 2002	Mainstream rock; active rock; alternative radio	Roadrunner	
United States	May 7, 2002	Contemporary hit radio	Roadrunner	
Australia	May 20, 2002	CD	Roadrunner	
Canada	May 20, 2002	CD	Roadrunner	
Various	May 28, 2002	CD	Sony	
United Kingdom	June 10, 2002	CD; cassette	Roadrunner	
United States	June 10, 2002	CD	Universal; PolyGram	
