= Cry Baby Cry (Santana song) =

2005 song by Mexican guitarist Santana

Single by Santana featuring Sean Paul and Joss Stone

from the album All That I Am and The Trinity (Japanese special edition)
- Released: May 8, 2006
- Recorded: 2005
- Genre: Latin rock; reggae; R&B
- Length: 3:53
- Label: Arista
- Songwriters: Lester Mendez; Sean Paul Henriques; Kara DioGuardi; Jimmy Harry
- Producer: Lester Mendez

Santana singles chronology
"Just Feel Better" (2005)	"Cry Baby Cry" (2006)	"Illegal" (2006)

Sean Paul singles chronology
"Temperature" (2006)	"Cry Baby Cry" (2006)	"Never Gonna Be the Same" (2006)

Joss Stone singles chronology
"Don't Cha Wanna Ride" (2005)	"Cry Baby Cry" (2006)	"Tell Me 'bout It" (2007)

"Cry Baby Cry" is a song by American rock band Santana from their nineteenth studio album, All That I Am (2005). The song features Jamaican singer and songwriter Sean Paul and English singer and songwriter Joss Stone, and was released as the album's third and final single. It was written by Lester Mendez, Sean Paul, Kara DioGuardi, and Jimmy Harry.

== Song information ==
"Cry Baby Cry" was the third US single and the second international single from Santana's album All That I Am. The song is also included as a bonus track on the 2006 special edition of Sean Paul's third studio album, The Trinity (2005).

The single was released in the United Kingdom on May 8, 2006, and was the biggest hit from Santana's album, despite peaking at number seventy-one on the UK Singles Chart and spending only one week inside it. However, it fared better than the previous single, "Just Feel Better", which missed the chart completely. It was the smallest hit from Paul's album though and his first single to miss the UK top forty, as well as the first single to miss the top forty for Stone.

== Music video ==
The music video, directed by Chris Robinson, features Santana playing the guitar, Sean Paul in a black wall singing, and footage of women crying (including actress Dania Ramirez). Stone does not appear in the video.

== Track listing ==
- CD single
1. "Cry Baby Cry" (Album Version) (Santana featuring Sean Paul and Joss Stone) – 3:53
2. "Con Santana" (Album Version) (Santana featuring Ismaïla and Sixu Toure a.k.a. Toure Kunda) – 3:20
3. "Cry Baby Cry" (FP Mix) (Santana featuring Sean Paul and Joss Stone) – 3:51
4. "Cry Baby Cry" (video)

== Charts ==
Chart (2006)	Peak position
France (SNEP)	142
Germany (GfK)	47
Hungary (Editors' Choice Top 40)	27
Italy (FIMI)	19
Netherlands (Dutch Top 40 Tipparade)	6
Netherlands (Single Top 100)	63
Romania (Romanian Top 100)	14
Switzerland (Schweizer Hitparade)	29
UK Singles (OCC)	71
