= She Keeps Me Up =

Single by Nickelback

from the album No Fixed Address
- Released: February 17, 2015
- Genre: Dance-rock; pop rock
- Length: 3:57
- Label: Republic
- Songwriters: Chad Kroeger; Jacob Kasher Hindlin; Josh Ramsay
- Producers: Nickelback; Chris Baseford

Nickelback singles chronology
"Million Miles an Hour" (2014)	"She Keeps Me Up" (2015)	"Satellite" (2015)

Music video
- "She Keeps Me Up" on YouTube

"She Keeps Me Up" is a song recorded by the Canadian rock band Nickelback. It was released standalone on February 17, 2015 in North America, as the fifth overall single from their 2014 album, No Fixed Address. In an interview with his brother Mike Kroeger for the Vancouver Sun, while noting many assume the lyrics are merely sexual innuendo, Chad Kroeger freely admits the song is actually about cocaine use. The additional vocalist on the song is Ali Tamposi.

== Music video ==
The music video, directed by Nigel Dick, shows two young ladies entering a secret club at night. When they enter, they see people dancing, a bar man juggling cups, the band wearing suits and sunglasses and a man dressed in funking clothing dancing on a disco floor. At the end the ladies leave the club and are holding each other's hands in the day. Porscha Coleman sang the backing vocals in the video.

== Chart performance ==
Chart (2014)	Peak position
Canada Hot 100 (Billboard)	78

== Certifications ==
Region	Certification	Certified units/sales
New Zealand (RMNZ)	Gold	15,000^{‡}
United Kingdom (BPI)	Silver	200,000^{‡}
^{‡} Sales+streaming figures based on certification alone.
