= What Are You Waiting For? (Nickelback song) =

Single by Nickelback

from the album No Fixed Address
- Released: September 5, 2014
- Recorded: 2014
- Genre: Alternative rock; pop rock
- Length: 3:40
- Label: Republic
- Songwriters: Chad Kroeger; Ryan Peake; Jacob Kasher Hindlin; Gordon "Gordini" Sran
- Producers: Nickelback; Chris Baseford

Nickelback singles chronology
"Edge of a Revolution" (2014)	"What Are You Waiting For?" (2014)	"Million Miles an Hour" (2014)

"What Are You Waiting For?" is a song by the Canadian rock band Nickelback from their eighth studio album, No Fixed Address, and released as the second overall single and lead pop single off the album. The song was released on September 5, 2014 to Australia and other various countries, before being shipped worldwide on September 9, 2014. The song impacted US Hot AC radio on September 22, 2014 and US CHR radio on October 21, 2014.

== Music video ==
Nickelback announced that they were shooting the music video for the track, along with "Edge of a Revolution", on August 12, 2014 through their social media accounts. Though in an interview with Chad Kroeger on Hard Drive Radio, Chad announced that the music video was being delayed due to the band not agreeing on the storyline for the song. He also stated that the storyline has been reshot numerous times. To hold fans over, Nickelback released the audio video on September 11, 2014 and the lyric video for the song through their YouTube Vevo account on September 26, 2014.

== Track listing ==
1. "What Are You Waiting For?"
2. "Edge of a Revolution"

== Charts ==
=== Weekly charts ===
Chart (2014–2016)	Peak position
Australia (ARIA)	40
Austria (Ö3 Austria Top 40)	6
Belgium (Ultratip Bubbling Under Flanders)	6
Canada Hot 100 (Billboard)	29
Canada AC (Billboard)	9
Canada Hot AC (Billboard)	16
Denmark (Tracklisten)	38
Germany (GfK)	11
Poland Airplay (ZPAV)	3
Slovenia (SloTop50)	20
Switzerland (Schweizer Hitparade)	7
US Adult Pop Airplay (Billboard)	26
US Bubbling Under Hot 100 (Billboard)	2
US Hot Rock & Alternative Songs (Billboard)	11

=== Year-end charts ===
Chart (2014)	Position
Switzerland (Schweizer Hitparade)	75

== Certifications ==
Region	Certification	Certified units/sales
Germany (BVMI)	Gold	200,000^{‡}
^{‡} Sales+streaming figures based on certification alone.

== Release history ==
Country	Date	Format	Label	Ref.
Australia	September 5, 2014	Digital download	Nickelback II Productions, Inc. (via Republic Records)	
Worldwide	September 9, 2014	Digital download	Nickelback II Productions, Inc. (via Republic Records)	
United States	September 22, 2014	Hot adult contemporary	Republic Records	
United States	October 21, 2014	Contemporary hit radio	Republic Records	
