= Into the Night (Santana song) =

2007 single by Santana

Single by Santana featuring Chad Kroeger

from the album Ultimate Santana
- B-side: "I Believe It's Time"; "Curación (Sunlight on Water)"; "Victory Is Won"
- Released: October 2, 2007
- Recorded: 2007
- Genre: Soft rock
- Length: 3:40
- Label: Arista
- Songwriter: Chad Kroeger
- Producer: Carlos Santana

Santana singles chronology
"Illegal" (2006)	"Into the Night" (2007)	"This Boy's Fire" (2008)

Chad Kroeger singles chronology
"Why Don't You & I" (2002)	"Into the Night" (2007)	"Porn Star Dancing" (2010)

"Into the Night" is the first single from Santana's 2007 compilation album, Ultimate Santana. The track features Chad Kroeger from Nickelback, who wrote the song. It has received a considerable amount of airplay on VH1. Dania Ramirez of Heroes stars in the music video. The song charted at number one in Hungary and reached the top 10 in Australia, Canada, Finland, and Italy.

== Track listing ==
1. "Into the Night" (Album version)
2. "I Believe It's Time"
3. "Curación (Sunlight on Water)"
4. "Victory Is Won"
5. "Into the Night" (Video)

== Music video ==
A screenshot from "Into the Night"

The music video features a man (Freddy Rodriguez of Ugly Betty and Six Feet Under) about to jump off a roof when he sees a bird leading him to a Colombian girl (Dania Ramirez of Heroes) dancing. He falls for her immediately and starts to follow her. Eventually he follows her to a club where he watches her dance, and at the end they dance together. Meanwhile, Kroeger and Santana play on the roof of the building.

== Chart performance ==
"Into the Night" was a crossover hit as it peaked at number 26 on the Billboard Hot 100, Santana's last top 40 hit to date in the US, as well as his last appearance on the Hot 100 as of 2026. In Canada, it was an even bigger hit. It peaked at number two for three consecutive weeks on the Canadian Hot 100. It also reached number four in Australia and number one in Hungary.

== Charts ==
=== Weekly charts ===
Chart (2007–2008)	Peak position
Australia (ARIA)	4
Austria (Ö3 Austria Top 40)	24
Belgium (Ultratop 50 Flanders)	24
Belgium (Ultratip Bubbling Under Wallonia)	10
Canada Hot 100 (Billboard)	2
Canada AC (Billboard)	22
Canada CHR/Top 40 (Billboard)	6
Canada Hot AC (Billboard)	1
Canada Rock (Billboard)	22
Czech Republic Airplay (ČNS IFPI)	62
Finland (Suomen virallinen lista)	9
Germany (GfK)	19
German Airplay (BVMI)	24
Hungary (Rádiós Top 40)	1
Italy (FIMI)	5
New Zealand (Recorded Music NZ)	24
Slovakia Airplay (ČNS IFPI)	4
Switzerland (Schweizer Hitparade)	49
US Billboard Hot 100	26
US Adult Alternative Airplay (Billboard)	22
US Adult Contemporary (Billboard)	20
US Adult Pop Airplay (Billboard)	2
US Pop Airplay (Billboard)	21

=== Year-end charts ===
Chart (2007)	Position
Australia (ARIA)	27
Hungary (Rádiós Top 40)	79

Chart (2008)	Position
Australia (ARIA)	79
Canada (Canadian Hot 100)	34
Hungary (Rádiós Top 40)	1
US Billboard Hot 100	98
US Adult Top 40 (Billboard)	23

== Certifications ==
Region	Certification	Certified units/sales
New Zealand (RMNZ)	Gold	15,000^{‡}
United States (RIAA)	Platinum	1,000,000^{*}
^{*} Sales figures based on certification alone.^{‡} Sales+streaming figures based on certification alone.
