= All That I Am (Santana album) =

Studio album by Santana
- Released: October 31, 2005
- Genre: Latin rock
- Length: 53:10
- Label: Arista
- Producer: Clive Davis

Santana chronology
Shaman (2002)	All That I Am (2005)	The Very Best of Santana – Live in 1968 (2007)

Alternative cover
- iTunes album cover

Professional ratings
Aggregate scores
Source	Rating
Metacritic	45/100
Review scores
Source	Rating
AllMusic	2/5 stars
Blender	2/5 stars
Entertainment Weekly	C−
The Guardian	2/5 stars
Los Angeles Times	2.5/4 stars
Mojo	2/5 stars
Paste	2/5 stars
Q	3/5 stars
Rolling Stone	2.5/5 stars
Uncut	4/10

All That I Am is the twentieth studio album by Santana and follow-up to the band's 2002 Shaman. It was released on October 31, 2005, in most of the world, and a day later on November 1, in the United States. All That I Am follows the format of his previous two studio releases, consisting primarily of collaborations with other artists. The album debuted at number 2 on the Billboard 200.

== Singles ==
The first single released from All That I Am was "I'm Feeling You", which featured Michelle Branch and the Wreckers; it was released in October 2005 after it received radio airplay in the previous month but only peaked at number 55 on the U.S. Billboard Hot 100. The second single was "Just Feel Better", which featured Steven Tyler; it was released in November 2005 and would peak at number 7 in Australia and number 77 in the UK. The final single was "Cry Baby Cry", which featured Sean Paul and Joss Stone and would only peak at number 71 in the UK.

== Track listing ==
1. "Hermes" – 4:08
  - Written by Carlos Santana and S. Jurad
  - Produced by Carlos Santana
2. "El Fuego" – 4:17
  - Written by Carlos Santana, Jean Shepherd and Richard Shepherd
  - Produced by Carlos Santana
3. "I'm Feeling You" – 4:13
  - Featuring Michelle Branch and the Wreckers
  - Written by Kara DioGuardi, John Shanks and Michelle Branch
  - Produced by John Shanks and Kara DioGuardi
4. "My Man" – 4:37
  - Featuring Big Boi and Mary J. Blige
  - Written by Antwan Patton, Nsilo Reddick, Nicholas Sherwood and Rob Thomas
  - Produced by Big Boi and the Beat Bullies
5. "Just Feel Better" – 4:12
  - Featuring Steven Tyler
  - Written by Jamie Houston, Buck Johnson and Damon Johnson
  - Produced by John Shanks
6. "I Am Somebody" – 4:02
  - Featuring will.i.am
  - Written by will.i.am and George Pajon, Jr.
  - Produced by will.i.am
  - Additional Production Lester Mendez
  - This song is considered by most as a tribute to "I Am - Somebody", a poem by Reverend Jesse Jackson.
7. "Con Santana" – 3:18
  - Featuring Ismaïla and Sixu Toure, also known as Touré Kunda
  - Written by Carlos Santana, Ismaïla Toure and Tidane "Sixu" Toure
  - Produced by Carlos Santana
8. "Twisted" – 5:11
  - Featuring Anthony Hamilton
  - Written by Dante Ross and Nandi Willis
  - Produced by Dante Ross
9. "Trinity" – 3:33
  - Featuring Kirk Hammett and Robert Randolph
  - Written by Carlos Santana and Michael Brook
  - Produced by Carlos Santana
  - This song is a tribute to the Pakistani musician Nusrat Fateh Ali Khan and is a cover of his song Tere Bina
10. "Cry Baby Cry" – 3:53
  - Featuring Sean Paul and Joss Stone
  - Written by Lester Mendez, Sean Paul, Kara DioGuardi and Jimmy Harry
  - Produced and Arranged by Lester Mendez
11. "Brown Skin Girl" – 4:44
  - Featuring Bo Bice
  - Written by Jamie Houston
  - Produced by Lester Mendez and Jamie Houston
  - Vocal Arrangement by Jamie Houston
12. "I Don't Wanna Lose Your Love" – 4:00
  - Featuring Los Lonely Boys
  - Written by Henry Garza, Ringo Garza and Joey Garza
  - Produced by Carlos Santana
  - Additional Production by John Proter and Los Lonely Boys
13. "Da Tu Amor" – 4:03
  - Written by Carlos Santana, Andy Vargas, and Gary Glenn
  - Produced by Carlos Santana

== Personnel ==
- Andy Vargas – lead vocals (1, 2, 7, 13)
- Carlos Santana – guitar, background vocals
- Chester Thompson – organ
- Benny Rietveld – bass guitar
- Dennis Chambers – drums
- Karl Perazzo – congas, timbales, percussion, background vocals
- Raul Rekow – congas, background vocals
- Jeff Cressman – trombone
- Bill Ortiz – trumpet
- Tim Pierce – rhythm guitar (11)

== Charts ==
=== Weekly charts ===
Weekly chart performance for All That I Am
Chart (2005–2006)	Peak position
Australian Albums (ARIA)	36
Austrian Albums (Ö3 Austria)	6
Belgian Albums (Ultratop Flanders)	52
Belgian Albums (Ultratop Wallonia)	34
Canadian Albums (Billboard)	10
Dutch Albums (Album Top 100)	20
Finnish Albums (Suomen virallinen lista)	13
French Albums (SNEP)	19
German Albums (Offizielle Top 100)	6
Hungarian Albums (MAHASZ)	20
Italian Albums (FIMI)	4
Japanese Albums (Oricon)	14
New Zealand Albums (RMNZ)	12
Norwegian Albums (VG-lista)	18
Scottish Albums (OCC)	36
Spanish Albums (Promusicae)	31
Swedish Albums (Sverigetopplistan)	29
Swiss Albums (Schweizer Hitparade)	5
UK Albums (OCC)	36
US Billboard 200	2
US Top Rock Albums (Billboard)	21

=== Year-end charts ===
2005 year-end chart performance for All That I Am
Chart (2005)	Position
French Albums (SNEP)	200
Swiss Albums (Schweizer Hitparade)	95
Worldwide Albums (IFPI)	49

2006 year-end chart performance for All That I Am
Chart (2006)	Position
US Billboard 200	151

== Certifications ==
Certifications and sales for All That I Am
Region	Certification	Certified units/sales
Austria (IFPI Austria)	Gold	15,000^{*}
Hungary (MAHASZ)	Gold	5,000^{^}
Japan (RIAJ)	Gold	100,000^{^}
New Zealand (RMNZ)	Platinum	15,000^{^}
Russia (NFPF)	Gold	10,000^{*}
Switzerland (IFPI Switzerland)	Gold	20,000^{^}
United States (RIAA)	Gold	500,000^{^}
^{*} Sales figures based on certification alone.^{^} Shipments figures based on certification alone.

== Digital Rights Management ==
This CD is thought to contain MediaMax CD-3 by SunnComm. Some anti-virus and anti-adware programs are attempting to remove said clones and impersonators of said DRM. Sony has recalled all affected CDs and has re-released the album without the DRM.
