= Why Don't You & I =

2003 single by Santana

Single by Santana featuring Alex Band

from the album Shaman
- Released: June 16, 2003
- Length: 3:52
- Label: Arista
- Songwriter: Chad Kroeger
- Producer: Lester Mendez

Santana singles chronology
"Feels Like Fire" (2003)	"Why Don't You & I" (2003)	"I'm Feeling You" (2005)

Alex Band singles chronology
"Why Don't You & I" (2003)	"Coming Home" (2007)

Chad Kroeger singles chronology
"Hero" (2002)	"Why Don't You & I" (2003)	"Into the Night" (2007)

"Why Don't You & I" is a song by American rock band Santana. The song was written by Chad Kroeger and recorded for Santana's 2002 album, Shaman, on the Arista record label. It was re-recorded in 2003 with vocals by Alex Band of the Calling and released as the third single in the United States on June 16, 2003. Both versions of the single charted in the US while the Alex Band version peaked at number 21 in New Zealand.

== Re-recording and single release ==
When Arista wanted to release the single in mid-2003, Roadrunner Records, the record label for Nickelback, refused permission citing concerns that Kroeger appearing on a "high-profile single" would compromise the excitement over Nickelback's fall 2003 release The Long Road and hurt the Nickelback album sales. Kroeger recommended Band, another BMG artist, to re-record the song's vocals for single release. The Alex Band version omits the guitar instrumental bridge, and was also included on Ultimate Santana.

Produced and arranged by Lester Mendez, the song reached number eight on the US Billboard Hot 100 chart on October 25, 2003. "Why Don't You & I" is Santana's sixth and last single as of 2026 to reach the top 10 in the US.

== Track listing ==
CD single
No.	Title	Length
1.	"Why Don't You & I" (radio edit)	4:05
2.	"Truth Don Die"	4:33
3.	"Manana"	6:14
4.	"Why Don't You & I" (video)

== Personnel ==
Personnel are adapted from the CD single liner notes insert.

- Carlos Santana – lead guitar, keyboards
- Chad Kroeger – lead vocals
- Alex Band – lead vocals (re-recorded version)
- Chester Thompson – keyboards (Hammond B3)
- Karl Perazzo – percussion
- Jesus "Chuchi" Jorge – trumpet, trombone
- Ed Calle – saxophone
- Lester Mendez – keyboards; horn arrangement
- Tim Pierce – additional guitars
- R. J. Ronquillo – additional guitars
- Lee Sklar – chorus bass

== Charts ==
=== Weekly charts ===
Chart (2003–2004)	Peak position
Canada CHR (Nielsen BDS)	4
CIS Airplay (TopHit)	40
Germany (GfK)	76
Hungary (Rádiós Top 40)	25
New Zealand (Recorded Music NZ)	21
Romania (Romanian Top 100)	89
Russia Airplay (TopHit)	26
Ukraine Airplay (TopHit)	55
US Billboard Hot 100	8
US Adult Contemporary (Billboard)	16
US Adult Pop Airplay (Billboard)	1
US Pop Airplay (Billboard)	3

=== Year-end charts ===
Chart (2003)	Position
Brazil (Crowley)	78
CIS Airplay (TopHit)	59
Russia Airplay (TopHit)	36
Ukraine Airplay (TopHit)	89
US Billboard Hot 100	53
US Adult Top 40 (Billboard)	10
US Mainstream Top 40 (Billboard)	28

Chart (2004)	Position
US Billboard Hot 100	75
US Adult Contemporary (Billboard)	30
US Adult Top 40 (Billboard)	9
US Mainstream Top 40 (Billboard)	92
