= Just Feel Better =

Single by Santana featuring Steven Tyler

from the album All That I Am
- Released: 15 November 2005
- Recorded: 2004
- Genre: Rock
- Length: 4:12
- Label: Arista
- Songwriters: Jamie Houston; Buck Johnson; Damon Johnson
- Producer: John Shanks

Santana singles chronology
"I'm Feeling You" (2005)	"Just Feel Better" (2005)	"Cry Baby Cry" (2006)

"Just Feel Better" was the second international single to be released from Santana's 2005 album All That I Am. The song features lead vocals by Aerosmith frontman Steven Tyler, also signed to Sony Music Entertainment. The song is produced by John Shanks and written by Jamie Houston, Buck Johnson and Damon Johnson. The single achieved reasonable success in Australia, debuting at Number 8 on the ARIA chart and receiving significant airplay. In Australia it has been on Rage (ABC) and videohits (Network 10) a number of times.

The song was also recorded with Puddle of Mudd frontman Wes Scantlin on vocals but Santana said he felt Tyler did it better, with more emotion, although he liked both renditions. In 2010, Damon Johnson recorded his own version of the song for his album Release.

This song is shown to be playing on the first generation iPod Nano on its packaging box.

== Music video ==
The music video stars Nikki Reed as a girl with various troubles, including a teacher who makes sexual advances towards her and a strained relationship with her mother. At the end, she finally meets a nice guy but who is suddenly killed in an accident, which drives her to make amends with her mother and work harder in school.

== Awards and nominations ==
=== APRA Awards ===
The APRA Awards are presented annually from 1982 by the Australasian Performing Right Association (APRA).

Year	Nominee / work	Award	Result
2007	"Feel Better" Buck Johnson, Damon Johnson, James Scoggin) – Santana featuring Steven Tyler	Most Performed Foreign Work	Won

== Charts ==
Chart (2005–2006)	Peak position
Hungary (Rádiós Top 40)	9
Hungary (Single Top 40)	10

== Release history ==
Release dates and formats for "Just Feel Better"
Region	Date	Format	Label(s)	Ref.
United States	15 November 2005	Mainstream airplay	Arista	
