= No Fixed Address (album) =

Studio album by Nickelback
- Released: November 14, 2014
- Recorded: May 2013 – July 2014
- Genres: Hard rock; pop rock; post-grunge
- Length: 43:07
- Label: Republic
- Producers: Nickelback; Chris Baseford; Brian Howes; Jason "JVP" van Poederooyen; Gordon "Gordini" Sran

Nickelback chronology
The Best of Nickelback Volume 1 (2013)	No Fixed Address (2014)	Feed the Machine (2017)

Singles from No Fixed Address
- 1. "Edge of a Revolution" Released: August 18, 2014; 2. "What Are You Waiting For?" Released: September 5, 2014; 3. "Million Miles an Hour" Released: November 25, 2014; 4. "She Keeps Me Up" Released: February 17, 2015; 5. "Satellite" Released: March 7, 2015; 6. "Get 'Em Up" Released: May 5, 2015

No Fixed Address is the eighth studio album by Canadian rock band Nickelback, which was released on November 14, 2014, via Republic Records. The album was preceded by the lead single "Edge of a Revolution", which was released on August 18, 2014. The album marks a notable change in the band sound, combining their usual post-grunge and hard rock sound with elements of dance-pop and electronic. This also is the band's only release on Republic Records, after leaving long-time record label Roadrunner Records in 2013, and then leaving Republic for BMG before the release of their ninth album, Feed the Machine, in 2017, as well as their first album to not be certified gold or platinum.

== Background ==
During an interview on CFOX-FM, lead singer Chad Kroeger stated that the band planned to release their eighth studio album before the end of 2014. The lead rock single was also announced, "Edge of a Revolution", which was scheduled to be released sometime in August 2014. The track was described as a 'departure' for Nickelback and a political song. It was also announced that frequent collaborator Chris Lord-Alge will return to mix some of the tracks on the album. It was also announced the band had signed to Republic Records. Chad also hinted that a potential album title was No Fixed Address.

On August 22, 2014, Nickelback announced that the album would be titled No Fixed Address and they released the track listing along with it. The album title was inspired by the fact that the album was recorded in many different places, and they never settled in a single spot.

Kroeger said the album has some songs that are a significant departure from the band's typical musical style, including a song called "Got Me Runnin' Round" that features American rapper Flo Rida and has a horn section in it.

== Singles ==
The lead US rock single from the album is titled "Edge of a Revolution", and was sent for adds on Rock radio on August 18, 2014, and was released to iTunes on August 19.

The lead pop single (second overall) is titled "What Are You Waiting For?". It was premiered on German and UK radio stations on September 4, before being released in Australia on September 5, 2014. It impacted US Hot AC radio stations on September 22, 2014, according to Republic Records' radio site.

The second US rock single (and third single overall) off the album is "Million Miles an Hour".

For the second pop single off of the album, the band decided to do a trio release, with different tracks going to different countries. "Miss You" was released in the United Kingdom on February 16, 2015, "She Keeps Me Up" was released in North America on February 17, 2015, and "Satellite" was released in Europe on March 7, 2015.

"Get 'Em Up" was later announced that the track will be sent for US Rock airplay on May 5, 2015, as the third rock single, and seventh overall single from the album. It was officially sent for rock adds on June 2, 2015.

It was announced on May 11, 2015, that "Satellite" would be impacting US Hot AC radio on the same day, making it the third pop single in the US. "Satellite" was later announced as the 3rd single in the UK and Ireland on May 21 and was added to the BBC Radio 2 B-List.

On May 17, 2015, it was announced by Virgin Radio Italy that "Make Me Believe Again" was going to be released as a rock single in Italy.

== Critical reception ==
Professional ratings
Aggregate scores
Source	Rating
Metacritic	54/100
Review scores
Source	Rating
AllMusic	3.5/5 stars
Billboard	3/5 stars
Consequence of Sound	D+
Rolling Stone	2/5 stars
USA Today	2/4 stars
Kerrang!	3/5 stars

No Fixed Address received a 54/100 review score on Metacritic, based on five reviews.

AllMusic, rating it 3.5 stars out of five, noted favorably that the album is more influenced by EDM than the band's previous work, which reviewer Stephen Thomas Erlewine attributed to a decisive change in style to remain relevant: "It's not only a commercially canny move, it generates the best Nickelback album to date."

== Commercial performance ==
In its first week of release, the album debuted at number two on the Canadian Albums Chart, selling 20,000 copies. As of January 2015, No Fixed Address has sold 58,000 copies in Canada. The album was certified platinum by Music Canada for sales of over 80,000 copies in Canada. In the United Kingdom, it became their first studio album since The State to miss the top 10 of the chart, despite receiving a Silver certification later.

In the United States, the album debuted at number four on the US Billboard 200 and number one on the US Top Rock Albums chart selling 80,000 copies in its first week. Debut sales for the album were less than the debut of the band's previous album, Here and Now, which saw 227,000 copies sold in its first week.

== Track listing ==
The track listing of the album was revealed on August 22, 2014. The track list changes were confirmed on their website on October 29, 2014.

No.	Title	Writer(s)	Producer(s)	Length
1.	"Million Miles an Hour"	Chad Kroeger; Ryan Peake	Nickelback; Chris Baseford	4:10
2.	"Edge of a Revolution"	C. Kroeger; Peake; Mike Kroeger	Nickelback; Baseford	4:03
3.	"What Are You Waiting For?"	C. Kroeger; Peake; Jacob Kasher Hindlin; Gordon Sran	Nickelback; Baseford; Brian Howes^{[a]}; Jason van Poederooyen^{[a]}; Sran^{[a]}	3:38
4.	"She Keeps Me Up"	C. Kroeger; Hindlin; Josh Ramsay	Nickelback; Baseford	3:57
5.	"Make Me Believe Again"	C. Kroeger; David Hodges	Nickelback; Baseford	3:33
6.	"Satellite"	C. Kroeger; Peake; Ramsay; Hodges	Nickelback; Baseford	3:57
7.	"Get 'Em Up"	C. Kroeger	Nickelback; Baseford	3:53
8.	"The Hammer's Coming Down"	C. Kroeger; Peake; M. Kroeger	Nickelback; Baseford	4:24
9.	"Miss You"	C. Kroeger; Peake; M. Kroeger	Nickelback; Baseford	4:02
10.	"Got Me Runnin' Round" (featuring Flo Rida)	C. Kroeger; Hindlin	Nickelback; Baseford; Sran^{[a]}	4:05
11.	"Sister Sin"	C. Kroeger; Peake	Nickelback; Baseford	3:25

Japanese edition
No.	Title	Length
12.	"Edge of a Revolution" (lyric video)	3:25
13.	"Edge of a Revolution" (music video)
14.	"Edge of a Revolution" (behind the scenes)
15.	"What Are You Waiting For?" (lyric video)

Notes

- ^{^[a]} signifies an additional producer

== Personnel ==
Nickelback

- Chad Kroeger – lead vocals, lead and rhythm guitar
- Ryan Peake – rhythm and lead guitar, keyboards, backing vocals
- Mike Kroeger – bass
- Daniel Adair – drums, backing vocals

Additional

- Ali Tamposi – backing vocals (track 4)
- Dave Martone – backing vocals (track 7)
- Flo Rida – guest vocals (track 10)
- Michael Sanders – guitar (track 10)
- Jerry Hey – horn arrangement (track 10)
- Natalie Cassidy – trumpet (track 10), waffle (track 11)
- Steve Holtman – trombone (track 10)
- Dan Higgins – saxophone (track 10)
- Melanie Taylor, Kenna Ramsay – backing vocals (track 10)

Production

- Producer: Chris Baseford
- Mixing: Chris Lord-Alge, except track 1 mixed by Randy Staub
- Mastering: Ted Jensen

== Charts ==
=== Weekly charts ===
Chart (2014–2025)	Peak position
Australian Albums (ARIA)	3
Austrian Albums (Ö3 Austria)	4
Belgian Albums (Ultratop Flanders)	41
Belgian Albums (Ultratop Wallonia)	72
Canadian Albums (Billboard)	2
Danish Albums (Hitlisten)	24
Dutch Albums (Album Top 100)	48
Finnish Albums (Suomen virallinen lista)	31
French Albums (SNEP)	90
German Albums (Offizielle Top 100)	7
Hungarian Albums (MAHASZ)	27
Italian Albums (FIMI)	18
Japanese Albums (Oricon)	15
New Zealand Albums (RMNZ)	12
Norwegian Albums (VG-lista)	8
South African Albums (RISA)	14
Swedish Albums (Sverigetopplistan)	13
Swiss Albums (Schweizer Hitparade)	3
UK Albums (Official Charts)	12
UK Rock & Metal Albums (Official Charts)	3
US Billboard 200	4
US Top Rock Albums (Billboard)	1
US Top Alternative Albums (Billboard)	1
US Top Hard Rock Albums (Billboard)	1

=== Year-end charts ===
Chart (2014)	Position
Australian Albums (ARIA)	30
Austrian Albums (Ö3 Austria)	66
German Albums (Offizielle Top 100)	65
Swiss Albums (Schweizer Hitparade)	45

Chart (2015)	Position
Australian Albums (ARIA)	77
Canadian Albums (Billboard)	14
Swiss Albums (Schweizer Hitparade)	65
US Billboard 200	93
US Top Rock Albums (Billboard)	9

== Certifications ==
Region	Certification	Certified units/sales
Australia (ARIA)	Platinum	70,000^{^}
Austria (IFPI Austria)	Platinum	15,000^{*}
Canada (Music Canada)	Platinum	80,000^{^}
Germany (BVMI)	Gold	100,000^{‡}
United Kingdom (BPI)	Gold	100,000^{‡}
^{*} Sales figures based on certification alone.^{^} Shipments figures based on certification alone.^{‡} Sales+streaming figures based on certification alone.

== Release history ==
Region	Date	Format	Label
Australia	November 14, 2014	CD, digital download	Republic Records
Europe	November 17, 2014	CD, digital download	Republic Records
Asia	November 17, 2014	CD, digital download	Republic Records
North America	November 17, 2014	CD, digital download	Republic Records
South America	November 17, 2014	CD, digital download	Republic Records
