= Shaman (album) =

Studio album by Santana
- Released: October 22, 2002
- Recorded: 2001–2002
- Genre: Latin rock; world; pop rock
- Length: 76:33
- Label: Arista
- Producer: Andres Munera, Fernando Tobon, Jose Gaviria, Kike Santander, Andy Vargas, Tony Lindsay, Cory Rooney, Dan Shea, Alex Ander, Rick Nowels, Dallas Austin, Lester Mendez, Carlos Santana, Jerry Duplessis, Wyclef Jean, Howard Benson, P.O.D., Clarence Greenwood, Dido Armstrong, Rollo Armstrong, Michael Shrieve, Jeeve, Klaus Derendorf, JB Eckl, KC Porter, Walter Afanasieff

Santana chronology
| The Essential Santana (2002) | Shaman (2002) | All That I Am (2005) |

Singles from Shaman
- 1. "The Game of Love" Released: September 23, 2002; 2. "Nothing at All" Released: March 2003; 3. "Why Don't You & I" Released: June 16, 2003; 4. "Feels Like Fire" Released: 2003

Professional ratings
Aggregate scores
| Source | Rating |
|---|---|
| Metacritic | 59/100 |
Review scores
| Source | Rating |
| AllMusic | 3/5 stars |
| Blender | 2/5 stars |
| Dotmusic | 2.5/5 stars |
| E! | B− |
| Entertainment.ie | 3/5 stars |
| Entertainment Weekly | B− |
| Mojo | 3.5/5 stars |
| Q | 4/5 stars |
| Rolling Stone | 3/5 stars |
| Uncut | 4/10 |

Shaman is the nineteenth studio album by Santana, released on October 22, 2002. It debuted at number 1 on the Billboard 200 with first-week sales of 298,973, and was later certified double platinum by the RIAA and gold in Greece.

The first single of the album was "The Game of Love", featuring Michelle Branch. "Why Don't You & I", featuring Chad Kroeger of Nickelback, was also re-recorded as a single in 2003, which featured Alex Band of the Calling.

Like the previous album, Supernatural, Shaman features various famous rock, hip hop, and pop artists, as well as Spanish opera star Plácido Domingo.

The album is Santana's longest studio release to date.

== Singles ==
The first single released, "The Game of Love" which features Michelle Branch, peaked at number 5 on the U.S. Billboard Hot 100, number 16 in the UK, and number 21 in Australia. A re-recorded version of "Why Don't You & I" with vocals by Alex Band peaked at number 8 on the U.S. Billboard Hot 100. "Feels Like Fire" (featuring Dido) and "Nothing at All" (featuring Musiq) failed to chart in most countries.

== Track listing ==
Shaman track listing
| No. | Title | Writer(s) | Length |
|---|---|---|---|
| 1. | "Adouma" | Angélique Kidjo, Jean Hebrail | 4:15 |
| 2. | "Nothing at All" (featuring Musiq) | Rob Thomas, Cory Rooney | 4:28 |
| 3. | "The Game of Love" (featuring Michelle Branch) | Gregg Alexander, Rick Nowels | 4:15 |
| 4. | "You Are My Kind" (featuring Seal) | Thomas | 4:19 |
| 5. | "Amoré (Sexo)" (featuring Macy Gray) | Gray, Lester Mendez, Dallas Austin, Javier Vazquez | 3:51 |
| 6. | "Foo Foo" | Yvon André, Roger Eugène, (Jean) Yves Joseph, Hermann Nau, (Jean) Claude Jean | 6:28 |
| 7. | "Victory Is Won" | Santana | 5:20 |
| 8. | "Since Supernatural" (featuring Melky Jean & Governor) | Wyclef Jean, Jerry "Wonder" Duplessis & Governor | 4:32 |
| 9. | "America" (featuring P.O.D.) | Sonny Sandoval, Marcos Curiel, Traa Daniels, Wuv Bernardo | 4:35 |
| 10. | "Sideways" (featuring Citizen Cope) | Clarence Greenwood (Citizen Cope) | 4:41 |
| 11. | "Why Don't You & I" (featuring Chad Kroeger) | Chad Kroeger | 4:34 |
| 12. | "Feels Like Fire" (featuring Dido) | Dido Armstrong, Rollo Armstrong, John "Pnut" Harrison | 4:39 |
| 13. | "Aye Aye Aye" | Michael Shrieve, Santana, Karl Perazzo, Raul Rekow | 4:45 |
| 14. | "Hoy Es Adiós" (featuring Alejandro Lerner) | Klaus Derendorf, Jean-Yves Docornet, Lerner | 4:37 |
| 15. | "One of These Days" (featuring Ozomatli) | J B Eckl, K C Porter, Santana | 5:51 |
| 16. | "Novus" (featuring Plácido Domingo) | Santana, Gábor Szabó, Walter Afanasieff, Ritchie Rome | 4:10 |

Shaman international track listing
| No. | Title | Writer(s) | Length |
|---|---|---|---|
| 1. | "Adouma" | Angélique Kidjo, Jean Hebrail | 4:15 |
| 2. | "Nothing at All" (featuring Musiq) | Rob Thomas, Cori Rooney | 4:28 |
| 3. | "The Game of Love" (featuring Michelle Branch) | Gregg Alexander, Rick Nowels | 4:15 |
| 4. | "You Are My Kind" (featuring Seal) | Thomas | 4:19 |
| 5. | "Amoré (Sexo)" (featuring Macy Gray) | Gray, Lester Mendez, Dallas Austin, Javier Vazquez | 3:51 |
| 6. | "Foo Foo" | Yvon André, Roger Eugène, (Jean) Yves Joseph, Hermann Nau,< (Jean) Claude Jean | 6:28 |
| 7. | "Victory Is Won" | Santana | 5:20 |
| 8. | "America" (featuring P.O.D.) | Sonny Sandoval, Marcos Curiel, Traa Daniels, Wuv Bernardo | 4:35 |
| 9. | "Sideways" (featuring Citizen Cope) | Clarence Greenwood (Citizen Cope) | 4:41 |
| 10. | "Why Don't You & I" (featuring Chad Kroeger) | Chad Kroeger | 4:34 |
| 11. | "Feels Like Fire" (featuring Dido) | Dido Armstrong, Rollo Armstrong, Pnut | 4:39 |
| 12. | "Let Me Love You Tonight" | Santana | 5:35 |
| 13. | "Aye Aye Aye" | Michael Shrieve, Santana, Karl Perazzo, Raul Rekow | 4:45 |
| 14. | "Hoy Es Adiós" (featuring Alejandro Lerner) | Klaus Derendorf, Jean-Yves Docornet, Lerner | 4:37 |
| 15. | "One of These Days" (featuring Ozomatli) | J B Eckl, K C Porter, Santana | 5:51 |
| 16. | "Novus" (featuring Plácido Domingo) | Santana, Gábor Szabó, Walter Afanasieff, Greg DiGiovine, Ritchie Rome | 4:10 |

== Personnel ==
- "Adouma"
  - Guitar – Carlos Santana
  - Keyboards – Chester D Thompson
  - Bass – Benny Rietveld
  - Drums – Billy Johnson
  - Percussion – Karl Perazzo
  - Congas – Raul Rekow
  - Vocals – Tony Lindsay, Carlos Santana, Karl Perazzo
  - Trombone – Jose Abel Figueroa, Mic Gillette
  - Trumpet – Mic Gillette, Marvin McFadden
- "Nothing at All"
  - Guitar – Carlos Santana
  - Lead Vocal – Musiq
  - Keyboards – George Whitty
  - Bass – Benny Rietveld
  - Drums – Carter Beauford
  - Congas & Percussion – Karl Perazzo
- "The Game of Love"
  - Lead Guitar – Carlos Santana
  - Rhythm Guitar & Lead Vocal – Michelle Branch
  - Electric Guitar – Rusty Anderson
  - Keyboards – Chester D Thompson
  - Programming – Dante Ross, John Gamble
  - Bass – Benny Rietveld
  - Congas & Percussion – Carlos Santana
- "You Are My Kind"
  - Guitar – Carlos Santana
  - Lead Vocal – Seal
  - Keyboards – Chester D Thompson
  - Bass – Benny Rietveld
  - Drums – Horacio Hernandez
  - Percussion – Karl Perazzo
  - Congas – Raul Rekow
  - Vamp Out Vocal – Karl Perazzo
  - Background Vocals – Karl Perazzo, Carlos Santana, Tony Lindsay
- "Amoré (Sexo)"
  - Lead Guitar – Carlos Santana
  - Lead Vocal – Macy Gray
  - Keyboards – Chester D Thompson
  - Bass – Benny Rietveld
  - Drums – Rodney Holmes
  - Percussion – Karl Perazzo
  - Congas – Raul Rekow
  - Trombone – Jeff Cressman, Jose Abel Figueroa
  - Trumpet – Javier Melendez, Bill Ortiz
- "Foo Foo"
  - Lead Guitar – Carlos Santana
  - Drums – Dennis Chambers
  - Keyboards – Chester D Thompson
  - Percussion – Karl Perazzo
  - Congas – Raul Rekow
  - Bass – Benny Rietveld
  - Vocals – Tony Lindsay, Andy Vargas
  - Trumpet – Bill Ortiz
  - Trombone – Jeff Cressman
- "Victory Is Won"
  - Guitar – Carlos Santana
  - Cello – Joseph Herbert
  - Viola – Daniel Seidenberg, Hari Balakrisnan
  - Violin – Jeremy Cohen
- "Since Supernatural"
  - Guitar & Sleigh Bells – Carlos Santana
  - Lead Vocals – Melky Jean and Governor Washington Jr.
  - Keyboards – Chester D Thompson
  - Programming & Accordion – K. C. Porter
  - Bass – Benny Rietveld
  - Drums – Rodney Holmes
  - Percussion – Karl Perazzo
  - Congas – Raul Rekow
  - Vocals – Tony Lindsay, K. C. Porter, Karl Perazzo
  - Trombone – Ramon Flores, Mic Gillette
  - Trumpet – Jose Abel Figueroa, Marvin McFadden, Mic Gillette
- "America"
  - Lead Guitar – Carlos Santana
  - Lead Vocal – P.O.D.
  - Rhythm Guitar – Sergio Vallín
  - Keyboards – Alberto Salas, Chester D Thompson
  - Bass – Juan Calleros
  - Drums – Alex González
  - Timbales & Percussion – Karl Perazzo
  - Congas – Raul Rekow
  - Background Vocals – Gonzalo Chomat, Alex González
  - Vocal Direction – Jose Quintana
- "Sideways"
  - Lead & Rhythm Guitar – Carlos Santana
  - Lead Vocal – Citizen Cope
  - Background Vocals – Chad & Earl
  - Keyboards – Chester D Thompson
  - Bass – Benny Rietveld
  - Drums – Rodney Holmes
  - Timbales & Percussion – Karl Perazzo
  - Congas & Percussion – Raul Rekow
  - Additional Percussion – Humberto Hernandez
- "Why Don't You & I"
  - Lead Guitar – Carlos Santana
  - Lead Vocal – Chad Kroeger
  - Rhythm Guitar & Percussion – Raul Pacheco
  - Keyboards & Programming – K. C. Porter, Chester D Thompson
  - Bass [Chorus Bass] – Leland Sklar
  - Drums – Gregg Bissonette
  - Timbales – Karl Perazzo
  - Congas – Raul Rekow
- "Feels Like Fire"
  - Lead Guitar – Carlos Santana
  - Rhythm Guitar – J. B. Eckl
  - Bass – Mike Porcaro
  - Lead Vocal – Dido
  - Keyboards – K C Porter, Chester D Thompson
  - Programming – K C Porter
  - Drums – Jimmy Keegan
  - Timbales & Percussion – Karl Perazzo
  - Congas & Percussion – Luis Conte
  - Background Vocals – Fher, Carlos Santana, Tony Lindsay, Karl Perazzo, K. C. Porter
  - Spanish Translation – Chein Garcia Alonso
- "Aye Aye Aye"
  - Lead Guitar – Carlos Santana
  - Keyboards – Chester D Thompson
  - Percussion – Carlos Santana
  - Programming – Mike Mani
  - Vocals – Tony Lindsay, Jeanie Tracy
  - Pro Tools Editing – Andre for Screaming Lizard
- "Hoy Es Adios"
  - Lead Guitar – Carlos Santana
  - Lead Vocal – Alejandro Lerner

== Charts ==
=== Weekly charts ===
Weekly chart performance for Shaman
| Chart (2002–2003) | Peak position |
|---|---|
| Australian Albums (ARIA) | 11 |
| Austrian Albums (Ö3 Austria) | 4 |
| Belgian Albums (Ultratop Flanders) | 34 |
| Belgian Albums (Ultratop Wallonia) | 16 |
| Canadian Albums (Billboard) | 4 |
| Canadian R&B Albums (Nielsen SoundScan) | 1 |
| Danish Albums (Hitlisten) | 4 |
| Dutch Albums (Album Top 100) | 3 |
| Finnish Albums (Suomen virallinen lista) | 7 |
| French Albums (SNEP) | 2 |
| German Albums (Offizielle Top 100) | 2 |
| Hungarian Albums (MAHASZ) | 14 |
| Greek Albums (IFPI) | 2 |
| Irish Albums (IRMA) | 38 |
| Italian Albums (FIMI) | 1 |
| Japanese Albums (Oricon) | 20 |
| New Zealand Albums (RMNZ) | 8 |
| Norwegian Albums (VG-lista) | 6 |
| Polish Albums (ZPAV) | 3 |
| Scottish Albums (Official Charts) | 18 |
| Spanish Albums (PROMUSICAE) | 4 |
| Swedish Albums (Sverigetopplistan) | 15 |
| Swiss Albums (Schweizer Hitparade) | 1 |
| UK Albums (Official Charts) | 15 |
| US Billboard 200 | 1 |

=== Year-end charts ===
2002 year-end chart performance for Shaman
| Chart (2002) | Position |
|---|---|
| Australian Albums (ARIA) | 59 |
| Austrian Albums (Ö3 Austria) | 68 |
| Canadian Albums (Nielsen SoundScan) | 36 |
| Canadian R&B Albums (Nielsen SoundScan) | 6 |
| Dutch Albums (Album Top 100) | 65 |
| French Albums (SNEP) | 67 |
| German Albums (Offizielle Top 100) | 41 |
| Swiss Albums (Schweizer Hitparade) | 22 |
| UK Albums (OCC) | 139 |
| US Billboard 200 | 103 |
| Worldwide Albums (IFPI) | 14 |

2003 year-end chart performance for Shaman
| Chart (2003) | Position |
|---|---|
| Australian Albums (ARIA) | 35 |
| Dutch Albums (Album Top 100) | 89 |
| US Billboard 200 | 39 |

== Sales and certifications ==
Sales and certifications for Shaman
| Region | Certification | Certified units/sales |
|---|---|---|
| Australia (ARIA) | Platinum | 70,000^{^} |
| Austria (IFPI Austria) | Platinum | 30,000^{*} |
| Belgium (BRMA) | Gold | 25,000^{*} |
| Brazil (Pro-Música Brasil) | Platinum | 125,000^{*} |
| Finland (Musiikkituottajat) | Gold | 15,811 |
| France (SNEP) | Gold | 250,000 |
| Germany (BVMI) | Platinum | 300,000^{^} |
| Greece (IFPI Greece) | Gold | 15,000^{^} |
| Hungary (MAHASZ) | Gold | 10,000^{^} |
| Japan (RIAJ) | Gold | 100,000^{^} |
| Mexico (AMPROFON) | Gold | 75,000^{^} |
| Netherlands (NVPI) | Gold | 40,000^{^} |
| New Zealand (RMNZ) | Platinum | 15,000^{^} |
| Norway (IFPI Norway) | Gold | 20,000^{*} |
| Poland (ZPAV) | Platinum | 40,000^{*} |
| South Korea | — | 38,749 |
| Spain (Promusicae) | Platinum | 100,000^{^} |
| Sweden (GLF) | Gold | 30,000^{^} |
| Switzerland (IFPI Switzerland) | 2× Platinum | 80,000^{^} |
| United Kingdom (BPI) | Gold | 100,000^{^} |
| United States (RIAA) | 2× Platinum | 2,517,000 |
Summaries
| Europe (IFPI) | Platinum | 1,000,000^{*} |
| Worldwide | — | 5,000,000 |
^{*} Sales figures based on certification alone.^{^} Shipments figures based on certification alone.
