= Chad Kroeger =

Canadian rock musician (born 1974)

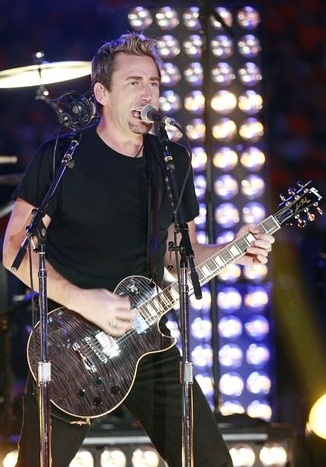
- Kroeger performing in 2011
- Born: Chad Robert Turton; November 15, 1974 (age 52); Hanna, Alberta, Canada
- Occupations: Singer; musician; songwriter
- Spouse: Avril Lavigne (m. 2013; div. 2015)
- Relatives: Henry Kroeger (grandfather)
- Musical career
- Genres: Post-grunge; hard rock; alternative rock; pop rock; alternative metal
- Instruments: Vocals; guitar
- Years active: 1995–present
- Label: 604
- Member of: Nickelback
- Website: nickelback.com

Chad Robert Kroeger (/ˈkruːɡər/, né Turton; born November 15, 1974) is a Canadian musician who is best known for being the lead singer, lead guitarist, primary songwriter, and founding member of the rock band Nickelback. In addition to his work with Nickelback, Kroeger has been involved with a variety of collaborations, appearing as a guest musician in several songs and has contributed in both production and songwriting. He has co-written several songs for other artists and films.

== Early life ==
Kroeger was born Chad Robert Turton in Hanna, Alberta, on November 15, 1974. His maternal grandfather, politician Henry Kroeger, was born in Rosenthal, Chortitza Colony, Yekaterinoslav Governorate (now Zaporizhzhia, Ukraine) to a Mennonite family of Prussian descent. After his father left the family when he was two, he started going by his mother's maiden name of Kroeger. He learned to play the guitar at age 13. His youth was sometimes troubled, and he was sent to juvenile detention for breaking into his junior high school.

== Career ==
=== Nickelback ===
In the early 1990s, Kroeger was part of a grunge cover band, Village Idiot, with his cousin Brandon Kroeger and future Nickelback members bassist Mike Kroeger (his half-brother) and singer Ryan Peake. In 1995, Kroeger, Peake, Mike, and then-drummer Brandon Kroeger, formed the band Nickelback. Kroeger has continued to record and tour with this band for more than 25 years.

=== The Suits XL ===
In 2001, Kroeger founded the band The Suits XL. Band members included Sam Loubier-Demers and Yohann Gosselin on vocals and guitars, drummer Patrick Paquet, keyboardist Felix-Antoine Berube and singer Oliver Roy de Belleval. The next year, he co-founded the Vancouver-based 604 Records. Later, in 2006, The Suits XL released an album through this label. The next year the band was nominated for a Canadian Indie Award.

=== Collaborations ===
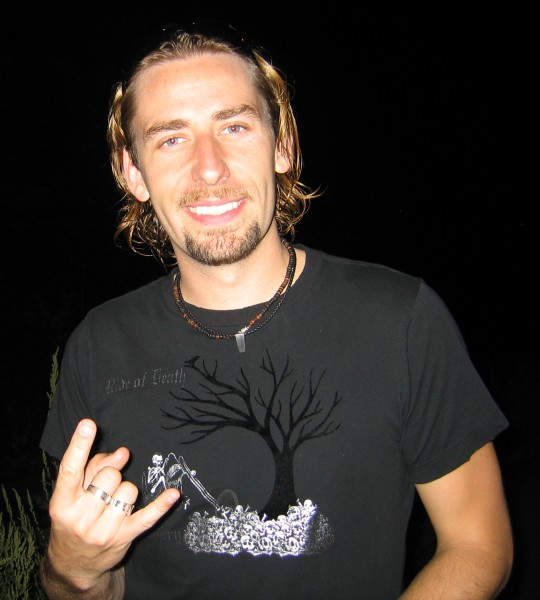
Kroeger in 2005

Kroeger produced music for the bands Default, Theory of a Deadman, and Bo Bice.

Kroeger, along with Saliva vocalist Josey Scott, Theory of a Deadman lead vocalist (serving as guitarist for this track) Tyler Connolly and Pearl Jam drummer Matt Cameron, performed the theme song titled "Hero" for the hit movie Spider-Man in 2002. Also in 2002, Kroeger wrote and sang on "Why Don't You & I" for Santana's Shaman. However, when Arista decided to release the song as a single in Summer 2003, Kroeger's label, Roadrunner, refused permission, citing concerns that Kroeger appearing on a "high-profile single" would compromise the excitement over Nickelback's fall 2003 release The Long Road. Kroeger recommended The Calling's Alex Band, another Arista artist, as a replacement for re-recording the single.

In 2003, Kroeger won an International Achievement Award for the song "Hero" at the SOCAN Awards in Toronto.

In 2007, Chad Kroeger worked with Santana for a second time, when he co-wrote and recorded guitar and vocals parts for a new song meant to appear on the compilation album Ultimate Santana. The track is called "Into the Night" and was released as a single on October 2, 2007. The album Ultimate Santana was released in October. Besides working with Santana, Kroeger also recorded with Travis Tritt on his album The Storm, where Tritt did a cover of Nickelback's "Should've Listened" track from The Long Road.

Kroeger also wrote and played guitar on Bo Bice's You're Everything.

Chad Kroeger, Eric Dill, Rune Westberg and Chris Daughtry wrote the debut single of Daughtry's new album. The single, titled "No Surprise", was debuted on American Idol Wednesday, May 6, 2009. Kroeger also contributed writing to another song from the album titled "Life After You." He and Brett James co-wrote Tim McGraw's 2009 single "It's a Business Doing Pleasure with You."

Kroeger featured on the Timbaland album Shock Value 2 with the song "Tomorrow in the Bottle", which also features Sebastian. In 2010, he provided guest vocals, along with Ludacris and guest lead guitarist Zakk Wylde, on the My Darkest Days single "Porn Star Dancing".

In 2011, Kroeger was featured on the Steel Panther album Balls Out with the song "It Won't Suck Itself." In early 2012, it was confirmed that Kroeger was working with French-Canadian pop rock singer Avril Lavigne on her fifth studio album.

== Personal life ==
In 2008, Kroeger was convicted of drunk driving in a British Columbia court after he was stopped for speeding in Surrey.

In 2009, Kroeger was sued in British Columbia Supreme Court by Noah Christian Morse, who alleged that Kroeger punched him in the mouth outside a nightclub in a fight that occurred almost two years prior. Morse claimed he suffered a concussion, permanent scars, and headaches as a result of the assault. Vancouver police investigated the incident but Kroeger was not charged.

Kroeger started dating Canadian singer Avril Lavigne on July 1, 2012. The relationship started after they began working together in March 2012 to write and record music for Lavigne's fifth album. Kroeger and Lavigne became engaged in August 2012. They married in the south of France on July 1, 2013, which is Canada Day. Lavigne and Kroeger honeymooned in Portofino, Italy. In September 2014, the entertainment media began reporting that Lavigne and Kroeger were heading for separation after a year of marriage. On September 2, 2015, Lavigne announced their separation via her official Instagram account.

In 2015, the second leg of the band's North American tour had to be cancelled so Kroeger could have surgery for a cyst on his larynx. The entire leg of the European tour was cancelled as well.

== Discography ==
=== Singles ===
List of singles, with selected chart positions, showing year released and album name
Title	Year	Peak chart positions										Certifications	Album
Title	Year	CAN	AUS	AUT	DK	FRA	NZ	SWE	SWI	UK	US	Certifications	Album
"Hero" (featuring Josey Scott)	2002	1	17	8	3	27	10	7	14	4	3	BPI: Gold; RMNZ: Gold	Spider-Man: Music from and Inspired by

==== As featured artist ====
List of singles, with selected chart positions, showing year released and album name
Title	Year	Peak chart positions										Certifications	Album
Title	Year	CAN	AUS	AUT	BEL (FL)	BEL (WA)	FIN	GER	NZ	SWI	US	Certifications	Album
"Into the Night" (Santana featuring Chad Kroeger)	2007	2	4	24	24	50	9	19	24	49	26	RMNZ: Gold	Ultimate Santana
"Porn Star Dancing" (My Darkest Days featuring Chad Kroeger and Zakk Wylde)	2010	40	–	–	–	–	–	–	–	–	90		My Darkest Days
"Let Me Go" (Avril Lavigne featuring Chad Kroeger)	2013	12	77	28	57	66	–	63	–	–	78		Avril Lavigne
"Middle of Nowhere" (Big Wreck featuring Chad Kroeger)	2021	–	–	–	–	–	–	–	–	–	–		TBA
"Lady Mine" (Josh Ramsay featuring Chad Kroeger)	2021	–	–	–	–	–	–	–	–	–	–		The Josh Ramsay Show
"Ragdoll" (The Lottery Winners featuring Chad Kroeger)	2025	–	–	–	–	–	–	–	–	–	–		KOKO
"—" denotes a recording that did not chart or was not released in that territory.

=== Other appearances ===
List of guest appearances on other artists' albums, compilation albums, etc.
Title	Year	Other artist(s)	Album	Notes
"Why Don't You & I"	2002	Santana	Shaman	Featured artist on album version only. Replaced by Alex Band on single release.
"Tomorrow in the Bottle"	2009	Timbaland	Shock Value II	Featuring Sebastian
"It Won't Suck Itself"	2011	Steel Panther	Balls Out	Also featuring Nuno Bettencourt
"Hear Me"	2019	Devin Townsend	Empath	Also featuring Anneke van Giersbergen and Samus Paulicelli
"Damn!"	2020	Jeris Johnson and Ricky Desktop	Single	Remix
