= Live from Nashville =

- Album cover

Live album by Nickelback
- Released: November 15, 2024 (CD and vinyl)
- Recorded: August 1, 2023
- Venue: Bridgestone Arena (Nashville, Tennessee)
- Genres: Alternative rock; post-grunge; hard rock; heavy metal; country rock; pop rock; alternative metal
- Length: 70:22
- Label: BMG
- Producers: Nickelback; Chris Baseford

Nickelback chronology
Get Rollin' (2022)	Live from Nashville (2024)	Everything Under the Sun (2026)

Singles from Live from Nashville
- 1. "San Quentin" Released: September 25, 2024; 2. "Animals" Released: October 23, 2024

Live from Nashville is the second live album by the Canadian rock band Nickelback, released by BMG on November 15, 2024. It is the first commercially available live album releasing on CD, vinyl, and digital formats, respectively. This album also contains featured guests from Chris Daughtry, Bailey Zimmerman, Hardy, Ernest, Josh Ross, and Brantley Gilbert. This is the first time Chad Kroeger's song, "Hero", was released on an official release as well as the first time Ryan Peake sang lead vocals on a track.

The album was recorded during Nickelback's visit to Nashville for their 2023 Get Rollin' tour. "Copperhead Road" and "Don't Look Back in Anger" are the only two songs on the album that are not performed by or feature the original artist.

== Track listing ==
All tracks are written by Chad Kroeger except where noted.

No.	Title	Writer(s)	Original release	Length
1.	"San Quentin"		Get Rollin'
2.	"Savin' Me" (with Chris Daughtry)	Nickelback	All the Right Reasons
3.	"Far Away"	Nickelback	All the Right Reasons
4.	"Animals"		All the Right Reasons
5.	"Someday"	Chad Kroeger; Ryan Peake; Mike Kroeger	The Long Road
6.	"Worthy to Say" (lead vocals: Ryan Peake)		The State
7.	"Figured You Out"		The Long Road	3:16
8.	"Hero"		Music from and Inspired by Spider-Man
9.	"Copperhead Road" (Steve Earle cover, with Brantley Gilbert and Josh Ross)	Steve Earle	Copperhead Road
10.	"High Time"	Chad Kroeger; Jeff Johnson; Mike Kroeger; Simon Clow	Get Rollin'	3:38
11.	"Flower Shops" (with Ernest)	Ernest; Ben Burgess; Mark Holman	Flower Shops (The Album)	3:26
12.	"Photograph"		All the Right Reasons
13.	"Rockstar" (with Bailey Zimmerman)		All the Right Reasons	4:23
14.	"Those Days"	Chad Kroeger; Ryan Peake	Get Rollin'
15.	"Sold Out" (with Hardy)	Hardy; David Garcia; Hunter Phelps	The Mockingbird & the Crow
16.	"How You Remind Me"		Silver Side Up
17.	"Gotta Be Somebody"	Nickelback	Dark Horse
18.	"Burn It to the Ground"	Chad Kroeger; Mike Kroeger; Joey Moi	Dark Horse
Total length:				70:22

Walmart bonus track

No.	Title	Writer(s)	Original release	Length
19.	"Don't Look Back in Anger (with The Lottery Winners)" (Oasis cover, live at the AO Arena, Manchester, England on May 20, 2024)	Noel Gallagher	(What's the Story) Morning Glory?	4:54

== Personnel ==
Nickelback

- Chad Kroeger – lead vocals, guitar, backing vocals on "Worthy to Say", production
- Ryan Peake – guitar, vocals, production, lead vocals on "Worthy to Say", co-lead vocals on "Figured You Out", "Hero" and "Don't Look Back in Anger", mandolin on "Copperhead Road"
- Mike Kroeger – bass guitar, vocals, production
- Daniel Adair – drums, vocals, production

Additional personnel

- Chris Baseford – production, mixing

== Charts ==
Chart performance for Live from Nashville
Chart (2025)	Peak position
French Rock & Metal Albums (SNEP)	21
