= List of UK Rock & Metal Singles Chart number ones of 2002 =

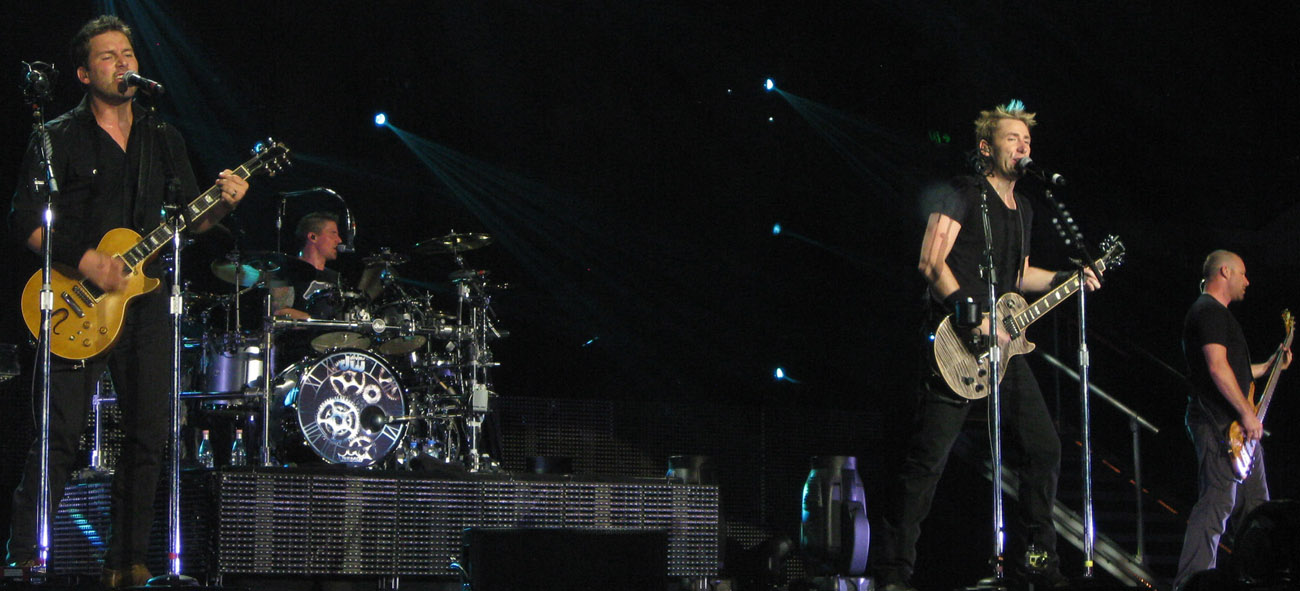
"How You Remind Me" by Nickelback was the longest-running number-one single of 2002, spending twelve weeks at number one. The band also reached number one for three weeks with "Too Bad".

The UK Rock & Metal Singles Chart is a record chart which ranks the best-selling rock and heavy metal songs in the United Kingdom. Compiled and published by the Official Charts Company, the data is based on each track's weekly physical sales, digital downloads and streams. In 2002, there were 19 singles that topped the 52 published charts. The first number-one single of the year was "In Too Deep" by Canadian pop punk band Sum 41, which spent the first four weeks of the year atop the chart. Sum 41 also had the final number-one single of the year, with "Still Waiting" spending the last five weeks of the year atop the chart.

The most successful song on the UK Rock & Metal Singles Chart in 2002 was "How You Remind Me" by Nickelback, which spent twelve weeks at number one. The band also spent three weeks at number one with "Too Bad". Sum 41 spent nine weeks at number one in 2002 – five weeks with "Still Waiting" and four weeks with "In Too Deep" – while Red Hot Chili Peppers spent four weeks at number one, with both "By the Way" and "The Zephyr Song" topping the chart for two weeks. Alien Ant Farm's "Movies" was number one for three weeks, while Puddle of Mudd topped the chart for two weeks with "She Hates Me" and one with "Blurry". "Alive" by P.O.D., "Girl All the Bad Guys Want" by Bowling for Soup, "All My Life" by Foo Fighters and "No One Knows" by Queens of the Stone Age spent two weeks at number one in 2002.

== Chart history ==
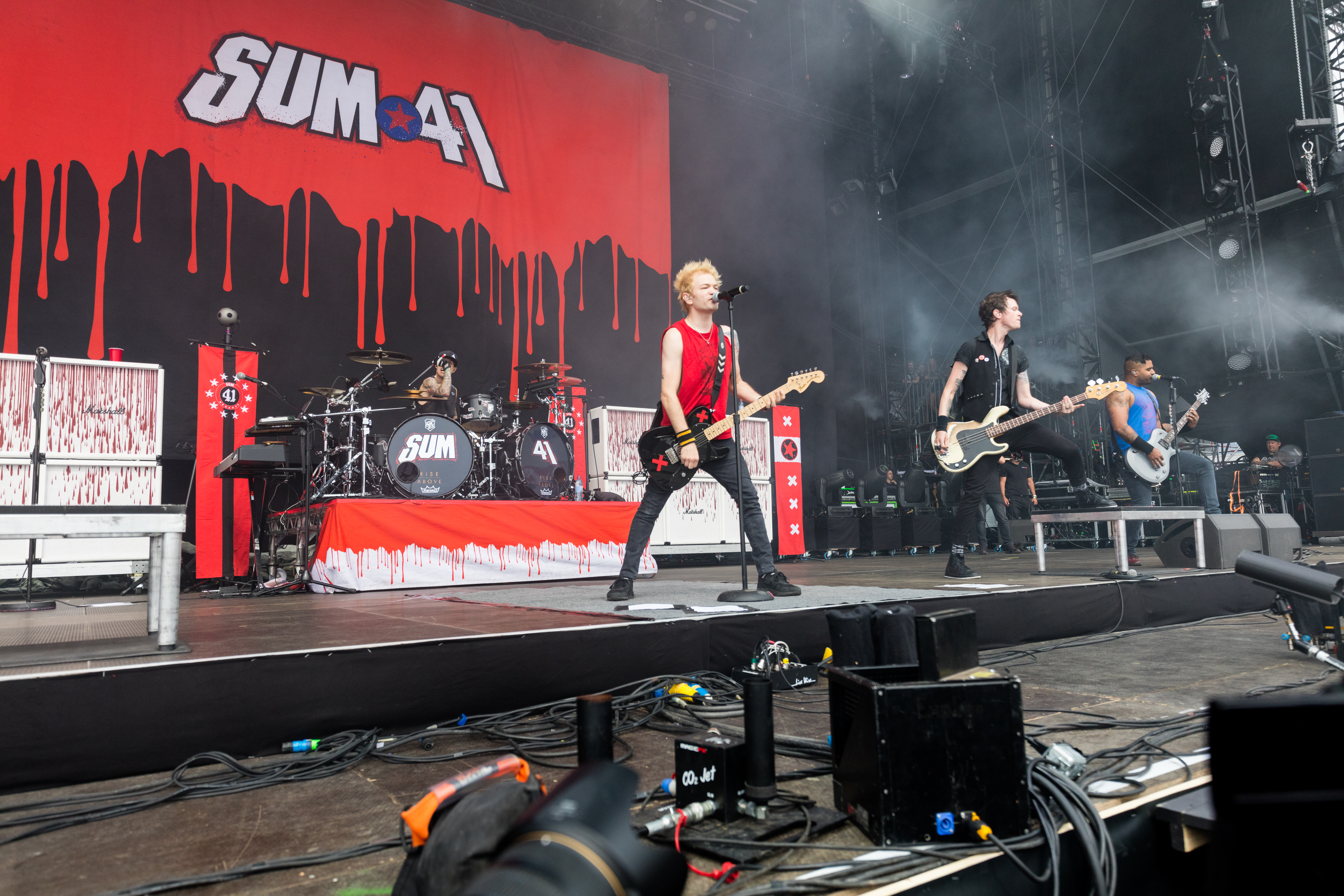
Sum 41's spent four weeks at number one with "In Too Deep" and five weeks at number one with "Still Waiting".

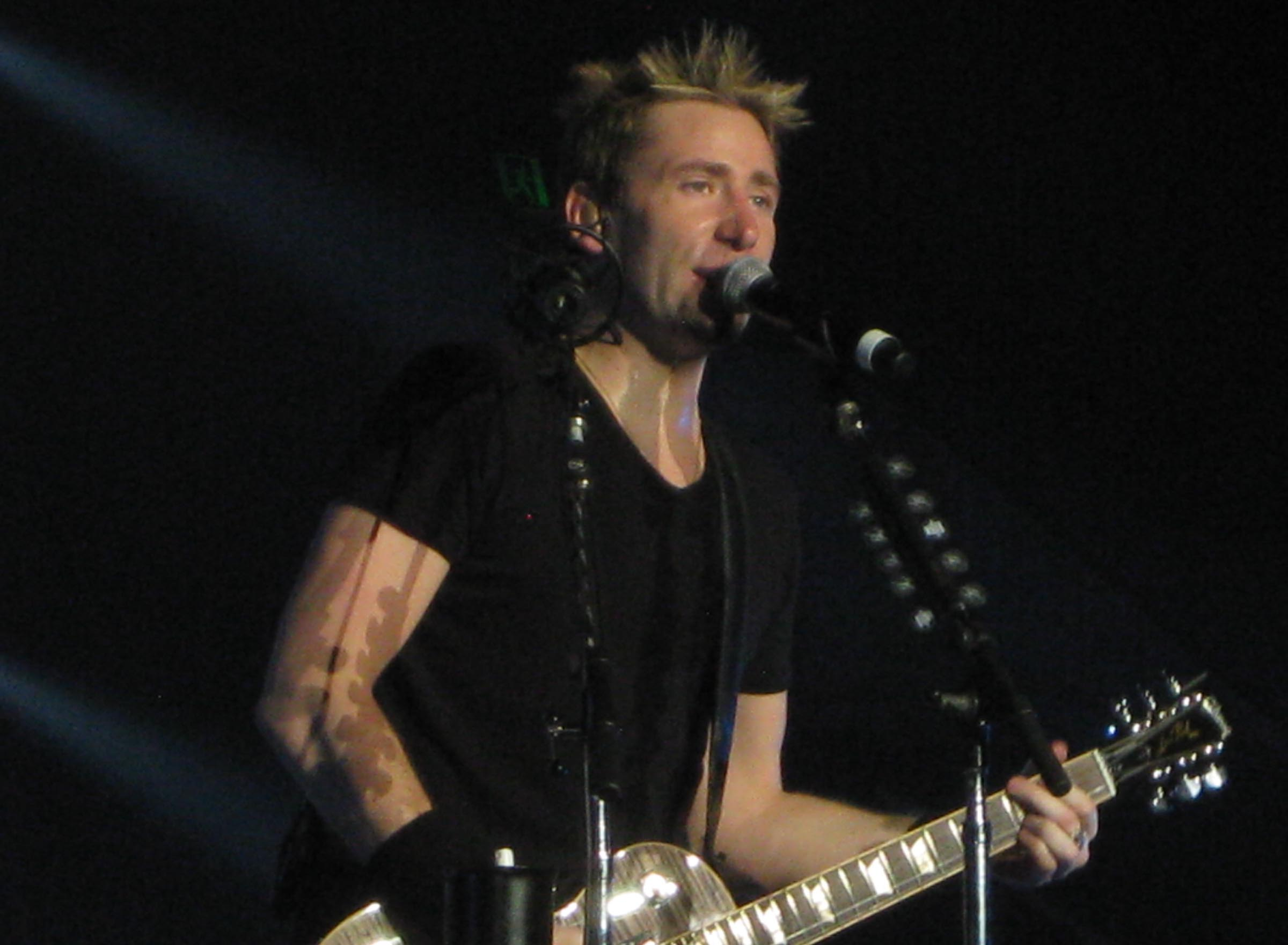
Chad Kroeger spent five weeks at number one with "Hero", which also features Josey Scott.

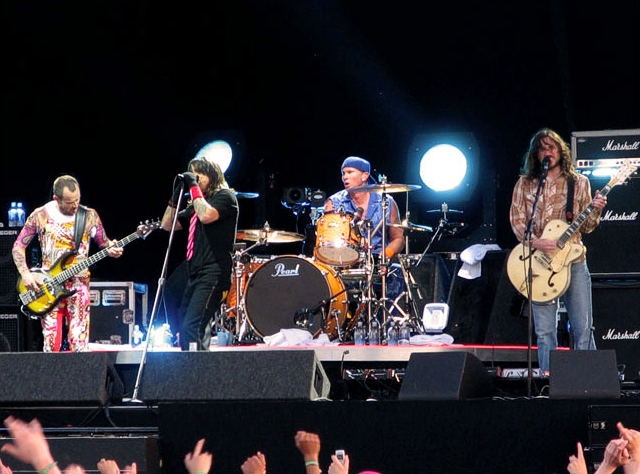
Red Hot Chili Peppers topped the chart with "By the Way" and "The Zephyr Song", both for two weeks.

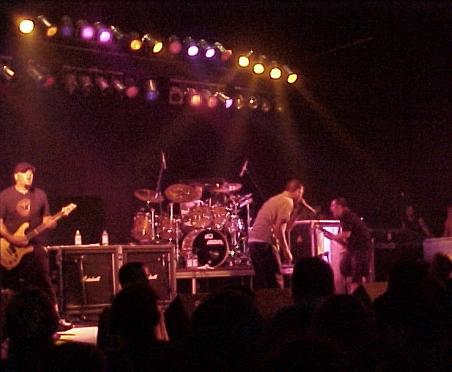
"Movies" by Alien Ant Farm spent three weeks at number one in 2002.

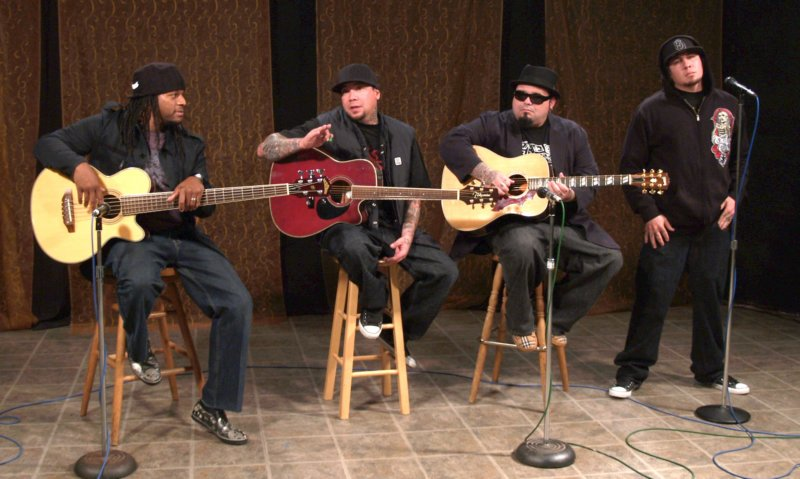
P.O.D. spent two weeks at number one on the chart with "Alive".

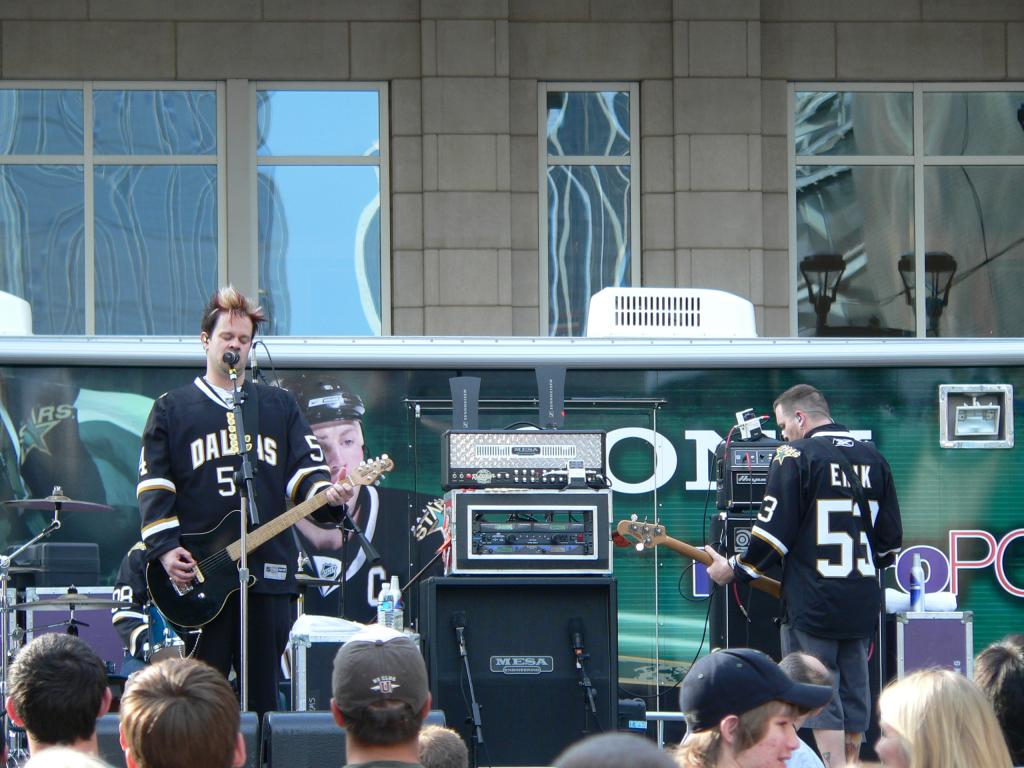
Bowling for Soup's "Girl All the Bad Guys Want" was number one for two weeks in 2002.

Issue date	Single	Artist(s)	Record label(s)	Ref.
5 January	"In Too Deep"	Sum 41	Mercury	
12 January	"In Too Deep"	Sum 41	Mercury	
19 January	"In Too Deep"	Sum 41	Mercury	
26 January	"In Too Deep"	Sum 41	Mercury	
2 February	"Alive"	P.O.D.	Atlantic	
9 February	"Alive"	P.O.D.	Atlantic	
16 February	"Movies"	Alien Ant Farm	DreamWorks	
23 February	"Movies"	Alien Ant Farm	DreamWorks	
2 March	"Movies"	Alien Ant Farm	DreamWorks	
9 March	"How You Remind Me"	Nickelback	Roadrunner	
16 March	"How You Remind Me"	Nickelback	Roadrunner	
23 March	"How You Remind Me"	Nickelback	Roadrunner	
30 March	"Tainted Love"	Marilyn Manson	Maverick	
6 April	"How You Remind Me"	Nickelback	Roadrunner	
13 April	"How You Remind Me"	Nickelback	Roadrunner	
20 April	"How You Remind Me"	Nickelback	Roadrunner	
27 April	"How You Remind Me"	Nickelback	Roadrunner	
4 May	"How You Remind Me"	Nickelback	Roadrunner	
11 May	"How You Remind Me"	Nickelback	Roadrunner	
18 May	"How You Remind Me"	Nickelback	Roadrunner	
25 May	"How You Remind Me"	Nickelback	Roadrunner	
1 June	"Here to Stay"	Korn	Epic	
8 June	"How You Remind Me"	Nickelback	Roadrunner	
15 June	"Blurry"	Puddle of Mudd	Geffen	
22 June	"Hero"	Chad Kroeger; Josey Scott	Roadrunner	
29 June	"Hero"	Chad Kroeger; Josey Scott	Roadrunner	
6 July	"Hero"	Chad Kroeger; Josey Scott	Roadrunner	
13 July	"By the Way"	Red Hot Chili Peppers	Warner Bros.	
20 July	"By the Way"	Red Hot Chili Peppers	Warner Bros.	
27 July	"Hero"	Chad Kroeger; Josey Scott	Roadrunner	
3 August	"Pts.OF.Athrty"	Linkin Park	Warner Bros.	
10 August	"Hero"	Chad Kroeger; Josey Scott	Roadrunner	
17 August	"Girl All the Bad Guys Want"	Bowling for Soup	Music for Nations	
24 August	"Girl All the Bad Guys Want"	Bowling for Soup	Music for Nations	
31 August	"Too Bad"	Nickelback	Roadrunner	
7 September	"Too Bad"	Nickelback	Roadrunner	
14 September	"Too Bad"	Nickelback	Roadrunner	
21 September	"Papa Don't Preach"	Kelly Osbourne	Epic	
28 September	"Everyday"	Bon Jovi	Mercury	
5 October	"She Hates Me"	Puddle of Mudd	Geffen	
12 October	"She Hates Me"	Puddle of Mudd	Geffen	
19 October	"All My Life"	Foo Fighters	RCA	
26 October	"All My Life"	Foo Fighters	RCA	
2 November	"The Zephyr Song"	Red Hot Chili Peppers	Warner Bros.	
9 November	"The Zephyr Song"	Red Hot Chili Peppers	Warner Bros.	
16 November	"No One Knows"	Queens of the Stone Age	Interscope	
23 November	"No One Knows"	Queens of the Stone Age	Interscope	
30 November	"Still Waiting"	Sum 41	Mercury	
7 December	"Still Waiting"	Sum 41	Mercury	
14 December	"Still Waiting"	Sum 41	Mercury	
21 December	"Still Waiting"	Sum 41	Mercury	
28 December	"Still Waiting"	Sum 41	Mercury	

== See also ==
- 2002 in British music
- List of UK Rock & Metal Albums Chart number ones of 2002
