= Live at Home =

- Directed by: Nigel Dick, Amber Cordero, Gerard Schmidt
- Produced by: Amber Cordero, Nickelback, Rick Parashar, Mike Sarkissian, Lewis Weinstein
- Starring: Nickelback, Jerry Cantrell
- Cinematography: Vance Burberry; Michael Zapanta
- Edited by: Tracy Hof
- Distributed by: Island Def Jam Music Group
- Release date: October 29, 2002
- Running time: 138 minutes
- Country: Canada
- Language: English

Live at Home is a live concert DVD released in 2002, filmed in Nickelback's home province of Alberta, Canada, during the tour supporting their album Silver Side Up. The concert was in Edmonton on January 25, 2002, at Skyreach Centre. The concert contained an audience of 25,000 people, the greatest number of people to ever attend the arena. Near the end of the show, Jerry Cantrell joined the group to perform the song "It Ain't Like That". During the encore, the band performs an acoustic cover version of "Mistake", a song by Big Wreck.

Live at Home was certified Gold by the RIAA and 2× Platinum by the CRIA.

== Track listing ==
All songs have since been re-released as b-sides to various singles, except for "Hollywood", "Hangnail", "Where Do I Hide" and "It Ain't Like That".

1. "Woke Up This Morning"
2. "One Last Run"
3. "Too Bad"
4. "Breathe"
5. "Hollywood"
6. "Hangnail"
7. "Worthy to Say"
8. "Never Again"
9. "Old Enough"
10. "Where Do I Hide"
11. "It Ain't Like That" (Alice in Chains cover; featuring Jerry Cantrell)
12. "Leader of Men"
13. "Mistake" (Big Wreck cover)
14. "How You Remind Me"

=== Additional footage ===
- The music videos for "How You Remind Me", "Too Bad" and "Leader of Men".
- The rare documentary The Making of "Too Bad" - the video.
- Multi-angle features that allow to watch each individual band member.
- Behind-the-scenes filming of the concert from the viewpoint of the director.
- Backstage footage before and after the show, along with interviews and on-the-road footage.

== Certifications ==
Region	Certification	Certified units/sales
Canada (Music Canada)	2× Platinum	20,000^{^}
United States (RIAA)	Gold	50,000^{^}
^{^} Shipments figures based on certification alone.

== Three #1's + The First One Live ==
Three #1's + The First One Live

Live album (EP) by Nickelback
- Released: 2002
- Recorded: January 25, 2002
- Venues: Sky Reach Centre, Edmonton, Alberta, Canada
- Genre: Post-grunge
- Length: 18:40
- Label: Roadrunner International

Nickelback chronology
Three Sided Coin (2002)	Three #1's + The First One Live (2002)	The Long Road (2003)

Three #1's + The First One Live is a 2002 live EP by Nickelback. The EP was recorded live in Nickelback's home province of Alberta, Canada during the tour supporting their album Silver Side Up. The concert was in Edmonton on January 25, 2002, at Skyreach Centre. The concert contained an audience of 25,000 people, the greatest number of people to ever attend the arena. The EP was also part of the promotion for the band's home video Live at Home.

=== Track listing ===
1. "How You Remind Me"
2. "Too Bad"
3. "Never Again"
4. "Leader of Men"

== Personnel ==
Nickelback

- Chad Kroeger — lead vocals, lead guitar
- Ryan Peake — rhythm guitar, backing vocals
- Mike Kroeger — bass
- Ryan Vikedal — drums
