= List of UK Rock & Metal Albums Chart number ones of 2002 =

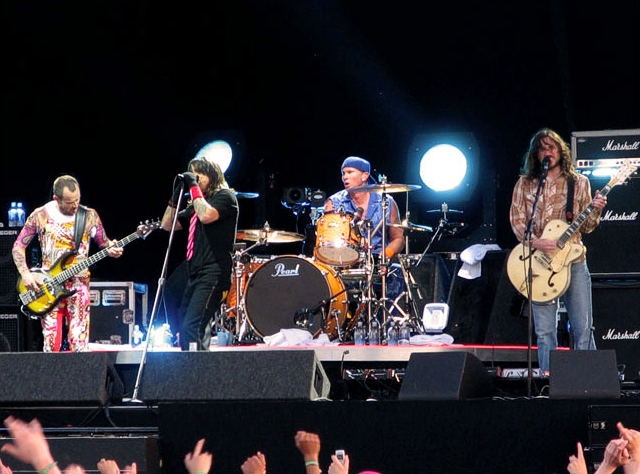
By the Way by Red Hot Chili Peppers was the longest-running UK Rock & Metal Albums Chart number-one album of 2002, spending 19 weeks atop the chart.

The UK Rock & Metal Albums Chart is a record chart which ranks the best-selling rock and heavy metal albums in the United Kingdom. Compiled and published by the Official Charts Company, the data is based on each album's weekly physical sales, digital downloads and streams. In 2002, there were 14 albums that topped the 52 published charts. The first number-one album of the year was Linkin Park's debut studio album Hybrid Theory, which remained at number one for the first two weeks of the year at the end of a six-week run which began on 8 December 2001. The final number-one album of the year was By the Way, the eighth studio album by Red Hot Chili Peppers, which spent the last six weeks of the year (and the first three weeks of 2003) at number one in its fourth spell of the year at the top of the chart.

The most successful album on the UK Rock & Metal Albums Chart in 2002 was By the Way, which spent a total of 19 weeks at number one over four spells, including an initial run of seven consecutive weeks and a run at the end of the year of nine weeks (including the first three of 2003). By the Way was the best-selling rock and metal album of the year, ranking sixth in the UK End of Year Albums Chart. Nickelback's major label debut Silver Side Up spent 16 weeks at number one in 2002, and was the 12th best-selling album of the year in the UK. Queen's three-disc compilation box set The Platinum Collection spent three weeks at number one in 2002, while three more albums – Linkin Park's Hybrid Theory, P.O.D.'s Satellite and the self-titled compilation by Nirvana – were number one for two weeks each during the year.

== Chart history ==
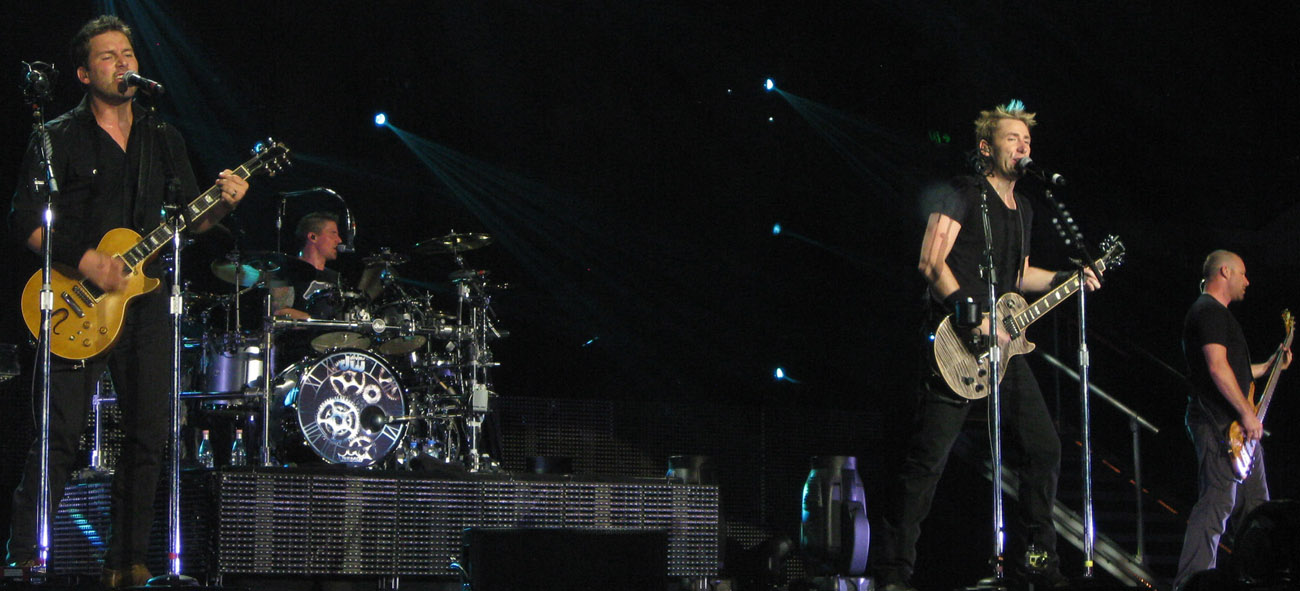
Nickelback's third studio album Silver Side Up spent 16 consecutive weeks at number one on the UK Rock & Metal Albums Chart in 2002. It was the year's second best-selling rock and metal album, and the 12th best-selling in the UK.

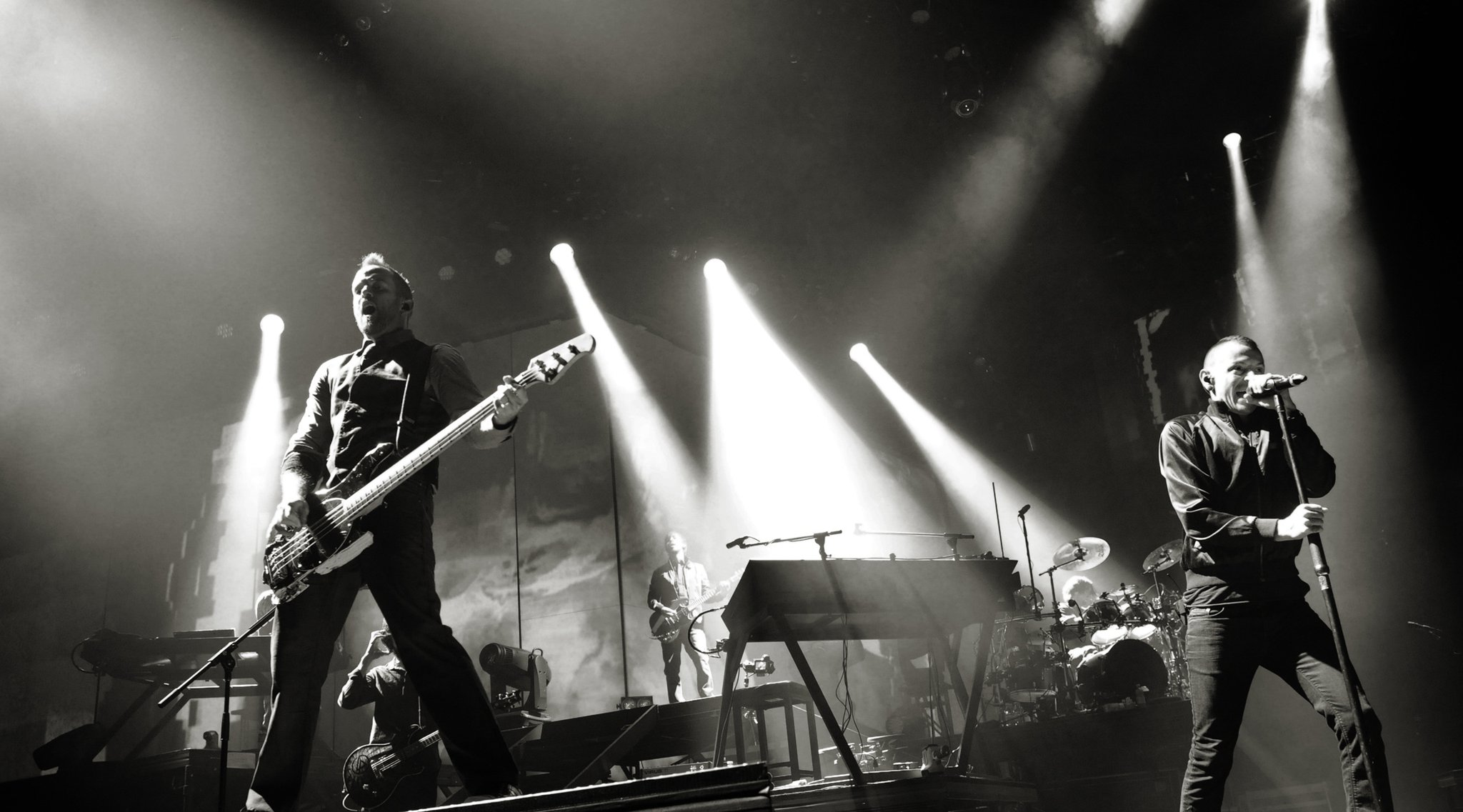
Linkin Park's debut studio album Hybrid Theory spent the first two weeks of 2002 at number one, at the end of a six-week run beginning the previous year.

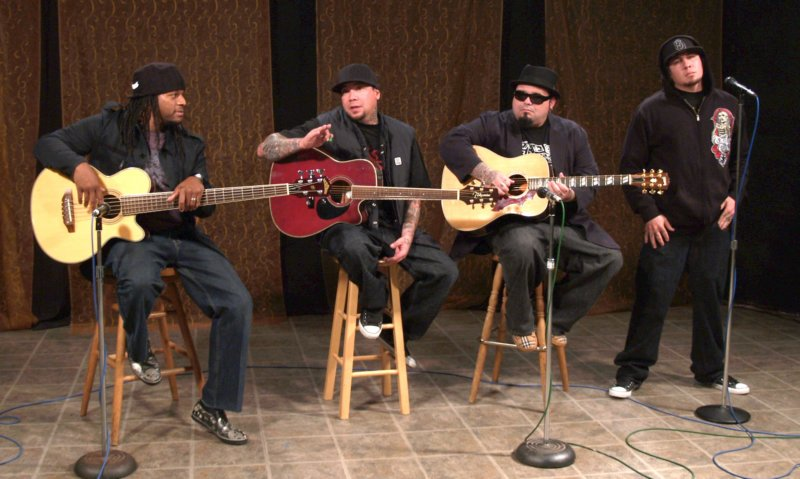
Satellite, the fourth album by P.O.D., was number one for two weeks.

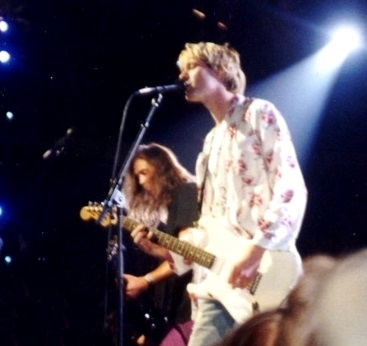
The self-titled compilation by Nirvana spent two weeks at number one in November 2002.

Key
†	Indicates best-selling rock album of 2002

Issue date	Album	Artist(s)	Record label(s)	Ref.
5 January	Hybrid Theory	Linkin Park	Warner Bros.	
12 January	Hybrid Theory	Linkin Park	Warner Bros.	
19 January	Satellite	P.O.D.	Atlantic	
26 January	Satellite	P.O.D.	Atlantic	
2 February	B.R.M.C.	Black Rebel Motorcycle Club	Virgin	
9 February	Silver Side Up	Nickelback	Roadrunner	
16 February	Silver Side Up	Nickelback	Roadrunner	
23 February	Silver Side Up	Nickelback	Roadrunner	
2 March	Silver Side Up	Nickelback	Roadrunner	
9 March	Silver Side Up	Nickelback	Roadrunner	
16 March	Silver Side Up	Nickelback	Roadrunner	
23 March	Silver Side Up	Nickelback	Roadrunner	
30 March	Silver Side Up	Nickelback	Roadrunner	
6 April	Silver Side Up	Nickelback	Roadrunner	
13 April	Silver Side Up	Nickelback	Roadrunner	
20 April	Silver Side Up	Nickelback	Roadrunner	
27 April	Silver Side Up	Nickelback	Roadrunner	
4 May	Silver Side Up	Nickelback	Roadrunner	
11 May	Silver Side Up	Nickelback	Roadrunner	
18 May	Silver Side Up	Nickelback	Roadrunner	
25 May	Silver Side Up	Nickelback	Roadrunner	
1 June	Ideas Above Our Station	Hundred Reasons	Columbia	
8 June	The Platinum Collection	Queen	Parlophone	
15 June	The Platinum Collection	Queen	Parlophone	
22 June	Untouchables	Korn	Epic	
29 June	Lovehatetragedy	Papa Roach	DreamWorks	
6 July	The Platinum Collection	Queen	Parlophone	
13 July	Hullabaloo Soundtrack	Muse	Mushroom	
20 July	By the Way †	Red Hot Chili Peppers	Warner Bros.	
27 July	By the Way †	Red Hot Chili Peppers	Warner Bros.	
3 August	By the Way †	Red Hot Chili Peppers	Warner Bros.	
10 August	By the Way †	Red Hot Chili Peppers	Warner Bros.	
17 August	By the Way †	Red Hot Chili Peppers	Warner Bros.	
24 August	By the Way †	Red Hot Chili Peppers	Warner Bros.	
31 August	By the Way †	Red Hot Chili Peppers	Warner Bros.	
7 September	Songs for the Deaf	Queens of the Stone Age	Interscope	
14 September	By the Way †	Red Hot Chili Peppers	Warner Bros.	
21 September	By the Way †	Red Hot Chili Peppers	Warner Bros.	
28 September	By the Way †	Red Hot Chili Peppers	Warner Bros.	
5 October	Bounce	Bon Jovi	Mercury	
12 October	By the Way †	Red Hot Chili Peppers	Warner Bros.	
19 October	By the Way †	Red Hot Chili Peppers	Warner Bros.	
26 October	By the Way †	Red Hot Chili Peppers	Warner Bros.	
2 November	One by One	Foo Fighters	RCA	
9 November	Nirvana	Nirvana	Geffen	
16 November	Nirvana	Nirvana	Geffen	
23 November	By the Way †	Red Hot Chili Peppers	Warner Bros.	
30 November	By the Way †	Red Hot Chili Peppers	Warner Bros.	
7 December	By the Way †	Red Hot Chili Peppers	Warner Bros.	
14 December	By the Way †	Red Hot Chili Peppers	Warner Bros.	
21 December	By the Way †	Red Hot Chili Peppers	Warner Bros.	
28 December	By the Way †	Red Hot Chili Peppers	Warner Bros.	

== See also ==
- 2002 in British music
- List of UK Rock & Metal Singles Chart number ones of 2002
