= Feelin' Way Too Damn Good =

2004 single by Nickelback

Single by Nickelback

from the album The Long Road
- B-side: "Where Do I Hide" (live); "Leader of Men" (live)
- Released: March 15, 2004
- Studio: Greenhouse (Burnaby, British Columbia); Mountainview (Abbotsford, British Columbia)
- Length: 4:16 (album version); 3:50 (single version)
- Label: Roadrunner
- Composer: Nickelback
- Lyricist: Chad Kroeger
- Producers: Nickelback; Joey Moi

Nickelback singles chronology
"Figured You Out" (2004)	"Feelin' Way Too Damn Good" (2004)	"Because of You" (2004)

Music video
- "Feelin' Way Too Damn Good" on YouTube

"Feelin' Way Too Damn Good" is a song by Canadian rock band Nickelback. Lead vocalist Chad Kroeger wrote the lyrics while the entire band composed the music. It was released on March 15, 2004, as the third single from their fourth studio album, The Long Road (2003). It reached the top 40 in Australia and the United Kingdom, topping the UK Rock & Metal Singles Chart. It was also successful in Canada, peaking at number 26 on the Radio & Records CHR/Pop Top 30 chart and number four on the publication's Rock Top 30 listing.

== Music video ==
The music video for "Feelin' Way Too Damn Good" is the last known Nickelback music video to feature former drummer Ryan Vikedal. The video shows the band playing in what looks like a warehouse, where a light is shown floating around them, as well as what appear to be high school couples in various settings throughout the first half of the video. As the video continues, the couples are distracted by the light which has spread around them. The various groups follow the mysterious light to the warehouse that the band is playing in, and become captivated by both the light and the band for the duration of the video. The video ends with Nickelback disappearing with the mysterious light.

== Track listings ==
UK CD single

1. "Feelin' Way Too Damn Good" (single version) – 3:50
2. "Where Do I Hide" (live at MTV Unplugged) – 3:42
3. "Feelin' Way Too Damn Good" (album version) – 4:15
4. "Feelin' Way Too Damn Good" (video)

European CD single

1. "Feelin' Way Too Damn Good" (single version) – 3:50
2. "Where Do I Hide" (live at MTV Unplugged) – 3:42

Australian CD single

1. "Feelin' Way Too Damn Good" (edit) – 3:51
2. "Leader of Men" (live at MTV Unplugged) – 3:44
3. "Feelin' Way Too Damn Good" (album version) – 4:15

== Credits and personnel ==
Credits are taken from The Long Road album booklet.

Studios

- Recorded at Greenhouse Studios (Burnaby, British Columbia) and Mountainview Studios (Abbotsford, British Columbia)
- Mixed at The Warehouse Studio (Vancouver, British Columbia)
- Mastered at Sterling Sound (New York City)

Personnel

- Nickelback – music, production
  - Chad Kroeger – lyrics, lead vocals, guitars
  - Ryan Peake – vocals, guitars
  - Mike Kroeger – bass
  - Ryan "Nik" Vikedal – drums
- Corinne Youchezin – female voice
- Joey Moi – production, engineering, digital editing
- Randy Staub – mixing
- Zach Blackstone – mixing assistance
- Alex "Laquaysh" Aligizakis – assistant engineering
- Ryan Andersen – digital editing
- George Marino – mastering

== Charts ==
=== Weekly charts ===
Chart (2004)	Peak position
Australia (ARIA)	40
Canada CHR/Pop Top 30 (Radio & Records)	26
Canada Rock Top 30 (Radio & Records)	4
CIS Airplay (TopHit)	179
Germany (GfK)	95
Netherlands (Dutch Top 40 Tipparade)	3
Netherlands (Single Top 100)	61
Russia Airplay (TopHit)	136
Scottish Singles Sales (Official Charts)	31
UK Singles (Official Charts)	39
UK Rock & Metal (Official Charts)	1
US Billboard Hot 100	48
US Adult Pop Airplay (Billboard)	12
US Alternative Airplay (Billboard)	23
US Mainstream Rock Airplay (Billboard)	3
US Pop Airplay (Billboard)	24

=== Year-end charts ===
Chart (2004)	Position
US Adult Top 40 (Billboard)	30
US Mainstream Rock Tracks (Billboard)	21
US Mainstream Top 40 (Billboard)	89
US Modern Rock Tracks (Billboard)	89

== Certifications ==
Region	Certification	Certified units/sales
United States (RIAA)	Gold	500,000^{‡}
^{‡} Sales+streaming figures based on certification alone.

== Release history ==
Region	Date	Format(s)	Label(s)	Ref.
United Kingdom	March 15, 2004	CD	Roadrunner	
United States	May 3, 2004	Mainstream rock; active rock; alternative radio	Roadrunner	
United States	May 24, 2004	Contemporary hit radio	Roadrunner	
United States	June 1, 2004	Hot adult contemporary radio	Roadrunner	
