= Figured You Out =

2003 single by Nickelback

Single by Nickelback

from the album The Long Road
- B-side: "Too Bad" (live); "Leader of Men" (live); "Where Do I Hide" (live)
- Released: November 3, 2003
- Studio: Greenhouse (Burnaby, British Columbia); Mountainview (Abbotsford, British Columbia)
- Length: 3:48
- Label: Roadrunner
- Composer: Nickelback
- Lyricist: Chad Kroeger
- Producers: Nickelback; Joey Moi

Nickelback singles chronology
"Someday" (2003)	"Figured You Out" (2003)	"Feelin' Way Too Damn Good" (2004)

Music video
- "Figured You Out" on YouTube

"Figured You Out" is a song by Canadian rock band Nickelback. It was released on November 3, 2003, as the second single from the group's fourth studio album, The Long Road (2003). The song spent 13 weeks at number one on the US Billboard Mainstream Rock Tracks chart, ending 2004 as the number-one mainstream rock song. Worldwide, the single peaked at number 10 in Australia and number 27 on the Canadian Radio & Records Rock Top 30 chart.

== Reception and legacy ==
Christopher Rosa of VH1 said the song's lyrics were misogynistic, and wrote, "Chad and the gang paints a picture of a woman being submissive to a man here. (She's literally on her knees.) It doesn't get more misogynistic than a man saying he prefers women with their pants off." In 2025, Graham Hartmann of Metal Injection included the track on his list of the "10 Greatest Divorced Dad Rock Songs of All Time", where he wrote, "I've never been to a Canadian strip club, but I imagine the day shift crew goes wild when Nickelback's daddy-dom anthem comes on."

== Track listings ==
European maxi-CD single

1. "Figured You Out" – 3:48
2. "Too Bad" (live at MTV Unplugged) – 4:28
3. "Leader of Men" (live at MTV Unplugged) – 3:44
4. "Figured You Out" (video)

Australian CD single

1. "Figured You Out" – 3:47
2. "Too Bad" (live at MTV Unplugged) – 4:28
3. "Where Do I Hide" (live at MTV Unplugged) – 3:42

== Credits and personnel ==
Credits are taken from The Long Road album booklet.

Studios

- Recorded at Greenhouse Studios (Burnaby, British Columbia) and Mountainview Studios (Abbotsford, British Columbia)
- Mixed at The Warehouse Studio (Vancouver, British Columbia)
- Mastered at Sterling Sound (New York City)

Personnel

- Nickelback – music, production
  - Chad Kroeger – lyrics, lead vocals, guitars
  - Ryan Peake – vocals, guitars
  - Mike Kroeger – bass
  - Ryan "Nik" Vikedal – drums
- Joey Moi – production, engineering, digital editing
- Randy Staub – mixing
- Zach Blackstone – mixing assistance
- Alex "Laquaysh" Aligizakis – assistant engineering
- Ryan Andersen – digital editing
- George Marino – mastering

== Charts ==
=== Weekly charts ===
Chart (2003–2004)	Peak position
Australia (ARIA)	10
Canada Rock Top 30 (Radio & Records)	27
US Billboard Hot 100	65
US Alternative Airplay (Billboard)	4
US Mainstream Rock Airplay (Billboard)	1

=== Year-end charts ===
Chart (2004)	Position
Australia (ARIA)	63
US Mainstream Rock Tracks (Billboard)	1
US Modern Rock Tracks (Billboard)	18

== Certifications ==
Region	Certification	Certified units/sales
Australia (ARIA)	Gold	35,000^{^}
Canada (Music Canada)	Platinum	80,000^{‡}
United States (RIAA)	Platinum	1,000,000^{‡}
^{*} Sales figures based on certification alone.^{^} Shipments figures based on certification alone.^{‡} Sales+streaming figures based on certification alone.

== Release history ==
Region	Date	Format(s)	Label(s)	Ref.
United States	November 3, 2003	Mainstream rock; active rock; alternative radio	Roadrunner	
Australia	January 19, 2004	CD	Roadrunner	
