= Someday (Nickelback song) =

2003 single by Nickelback

Single by Nickelback

from the album The Long Road
- B-side: "Slow Motion"
- Released: 28 July 2003
- Studio: Greenhouse (Burnaby, British Columbia); Mountainview (Abbotsford, British Columbia)
- Genre: Post-grunge; alternative rock
- Length: 3:27 (album version); 3:15 (single version)
- Label: Roadrunner
- Composer: Nickelback
- Lyricists: Chad Kroeger; Mike Kroeger; Ryan Peake
- Producers: Nickelback; Joey Moi

Nickelback singles chronology
"Never Again" (2002)	"Someday" (2003)	"Figured You Out" (2003)

Music video
- "Someday" on YouTube

"Someday" is a song by Canadian rock band Nickelback. The lyrics were written by band members Chad Kroeger, Mike Kroeger, and Ryan Peake, while the music was composed by the entire band. Produced by Nickelback and Joey Moi, "Someday" is a guitar-driven rock ballad that lacks keyboards and orchestral strings. The song was included on Nickelback's fourth studio album, The Long Road (2003), and was released as its lead single. The song was serviced to US modern rock radio on 28 July 2003 and was released commercially in several countries throughout 2003, starting with Japan in late August.

Upon its release, "Someday" gave Nickelback their first commercial Canadian number-one single, topping the Canadian Singles Chart for three weeks in September and October 2003. It was also successful in the United States, becoming Nickelback's longest-charting hit on two Billboard pop airplay charts, reaching the top five on both the Mainstream and Modern Rock Tracks charts, and peaking at number seven on the main Hot 100 chart. Outside North America, the song entered the top 10 in four countries and the top 40 in eight others. Nickelback promoted the song by filming a music video directed by Nigel Dick and by performing the song live on The Tonight Show with Jay Leno.

== Composition and lyrics ==
"Someday" is a midtempo post-grunge and alternative rock ballad, described as a "splattering tidal wave of guitars". All of Nickelback composed the music while Chad Kroeger, Mike Kroeger, and Ryan Peake penned the lyrics. No orchestration or keyboards are used in the track. The song begins with an electric guitar played by Chad Kroeger with an EBow, making it sound like an orchestral string instrument. Peake played the rhythm guitar, a Gibson Flying V with pickups from EMG; Peake stated that he used this combination because "it has such a meaty sound". Mike played bass guitar while Ryan "Nik" Vikedal played drums. Additional strings were provided by Brian Larson, Cameron Wilson, Henry Lee, and Zoltan Rozsnyai. Eva Zhu of CBC Music made the assessment that the lyrics are "longing for a doomed relationship to work out".

"Someday" and The Long Road were recorded at Greenhouse Studios in Burnaby, British Columbia, and at Mountainview Studios in Abbotsford, British Columbia. Production was handled by Nickelback and Joey Moi; Moi also engineered the track and edited it digitally alongside Ryan Andersen. Mixing, handled by Randy Staub, occurred at The Warehouse Studio in Vancouver, British Columbia, using the same SSL board that was used to mix albums such as Bon Jovi's Slippery When Wet (1986) and Metallica's Metallica (1991); Kroeger would later purchase the board and use it for his home studio.

== Release and airplay ==
On 28 July 2003, Roadrunner Records serviced "Someday" to American modern rock radio as the lead single from The Long Road. The following week, it became the most-added song on three radio formats: modern rock, active rock, and mainstream rock, with a total of 188 adds. Within two weeks of its release, it had gained 3,000 plays, and within four weeks, it was a top-10 success on all three formats plus heritage rock, becoming one of the few non-hip-hop songs of 2003 to experience instant success on radio. Following the song's boom on rock formats, Roadrunner then targeted pop formats, shipping the track to hot adult contemporary, triple-A, and contemporary hit radio (CHR) on 8 September 2003. It experienced similar success on CHR, entering the top 10 on two Billboard pop airplay charts and giving Nickelback their most enduring hit on both. In December 2004, Nielsen BDS awarded the song a Spin Award for accruing over 500,000 plays on radio.

The first physical format of "Someday", a CD single, was issued in Japan on 29 August 2003. The CD contains both the single and album mixes of "Someday" plus the B-side "Slow Motion", which was included only on the Japanese pressings of The Long Road. A CD with the same track listing was released in Canada, with a longer version of the single mix. In Australia, a similar CD was released on 1 September 2003 with the single mix replaced by an acoustic mix. Two weeks later, on 15 September, another CD was issued in the United Kingdom, containing the album and acoustic versions of "Someday" plus the track's music video and "Slow Motion". In Europe, the Japanese version of the CD was released as well as a two-track CD single that contains the single and album mixes.

== Critical reception and legacy ==
Writing for Billboard magazine, Chuck Taylor listed "Someday" as an "Essential" pick and gave it a rating of "a perfect ear-scorching 10", calling Kroeger's vocal performance "bombastic" and noting its appeal to radio, calling it "hard-rocking fodder for the masses" and referring to the song's melody as "anthemic". Keith Caulfield of the same publication labelled the track as a highlight from the album. British trade paper Music Week wrote that the song is "powerful yet melodic". Retrospectively, in 2025, Eva Zhu of CBC Music stated that "Nickelback mastered the art of writing melodramatic alt-rock" with the track.

== Commercial performance ==
"Someday" made its first chart appearance on 16 August 2003, debuting at number 14 on the US Billboard Mainstream Rock Tracks chart and number 24 on the Billboard Modern Rock Tracks chart. On 13 September, it reached its peak of number two on the Mainstream Rock Tracks chart, and three weeks later, it obtained its highest position of number four on the Modern Rock Tracks chart. In both instances, the song charted for 26 weeks. On the main Billboard Hot 100 chart, the track debuted at number 81 on 23 August 2003 and took 25 more weeks to reach its peak of number seven in February 2004, giving Nickelback their second top-10 hit in the United States. The song remained on the Hot 100 for 50 weeks in total, making it Nickelback's longest-chart single in the US as of 2026, and ended 2004 at number 17 on the Hot 100 year-end chart. It also gave the band their longest-charting hit on both the Billboard Adult Top 40 and Mainstream Top 40 rankings, remaining on the charts for 31 and 54 weeks, respectively. On the Adult Top 40, it peaked at number two in February 2004, while on the Mainstream Top 40, it reached number one for a single week the following month, giving Nickelback their first number one on that listing. In September 2026, the Recording Industry Association of America (RIAA) certified the song platinum for sales exceeding 1,000,000.

In Canada, "Someday" debuted at number three on the Canadian Singles Chart on 20 September 2003. The following week, it ascended to number one, making it Nickelback's first commercial number-one single in their home country. It stayed atop the chart for three weeks and remained within the top 30 for 18 weeks. Music Canada certified the song double platinum in November 2023 for sales and streaming figures exceeding 160,000 units. On Australia's ARIA Singles Chart, "Someday" debuted at number 10 on the week dated 14 September 2003 and rose to its peak of number four on 9 November, making it the band's second top-five hit there as well as their second-longest-charting, after "How You Remind Me", at 23 weeks. "Someday" was also Nickelback's second top-10 hit in New Zealand, where it debuted at number 47 on the RIANZ Singles Chart and jumped to its peak of number nine five weeks later, staying in the top 50 for a total of 20 weeks. In both countries, the single is certified platinum for shipments of over 70,000 copies (Australia) and sales and streaming figures exceeding 30,000 units (New Zealand).

"Someday" was also a European hit, achieving a peak of number 16 on the Eurochart Hot 100. In the United Kingdom, the single debuted and peaked at number six on the UK Singles Chart on 21 September 2003, and it topped the UK Rock & Metal Singles Chart the same week. On the UK Singles Chart, it was Nickelback's third top-10 hit and fourth top-40 hit, remaining within the top 100 for nine weeks. The British Phonographic Industry (BPI) awarded the song a gold certification in June 2024 for sales and streams of over 400,000 units. In Ireland, "Someday" first appeared at number 18, its peak, on the Irish Singles Chart on 18 September 2003, spending that week only within the top 30 before dropping out. In Italy, the song was a top-10 hit, peaking at number nine. "Someday" additionally entered the top 20 in Austria, the Netherlands, and Switzerland. In Germany, it peaked at number 26, while in Sweden and the Flanders region of Belgium, it entered the top 30. Elsewhere, the single charted lowly in France and Romania, while in Denmark, it was certified gold by the International Federation of the Phonographic Industry (IFPI) for sales and streams exceeding 45,000 units.

== Music video ==
The music video for "Someday" was directed by Nigel Dick and shot in Vancouver. A version with an alternate ending also exists. The video premiered on television through MTV2 on 2 September 2003. Canadian TV channel MuchMusic added the video to its playlists on the week ending 7 September 2003, while its American counterpart, Fuse, added the video the following week, as did VH1. MTV did not add the video until the week ending 14 December. Eva Zhu of CBC Music stated that the video "seems to hinge entirely on its M. Night Shyamalan-esque twist".

== Live performances ==
In September 2003, Nickelback performed "Someday" live on The Tonight Show with Jay Leno.

== Track listings ==
Canadian maxi-CD single

1. "Someday" (single mix) – 3:25
2. "Someday" (album mix) – 3:23
3. "Slow Motion" – 3:32

Australian CD single

1. "Someday" (album mix)
2. "Someday" (acoustic mix)
3. "Slow Motion"

European CD single

1. "Someday" (single mix) – 3:14
2. "Someday" (album mix) – 3:25

European maxi-CD and Japanese CD single

1. "Someday" (single mix) – 3:14
2. "Someday" (album mix) – 3:25
3. "Slow Motion" – 3:32

UK CD single

1. "Someday" (album version) – 3:25
2. "Slow Motion" – 3:32
3. "Someday" (acoustic version) – 3:23
4. "Someday" (video)

== Credits and personnel ==
Credits are taken from The Long Road album booklet.

Studios

- Recorded at Greenhouse Studios (Burnaby, British Columbia) and Mountainview Studios (Abbotsford, British Columbia)
- Mixed at The Warehouse Studio (Vancouver, British Columbia)
- Mastered at Sterling Sound (New York City)

Personnel

- Nickelback – music, production
  - Chad Kroeger – lyrics, lead vocals, guitars
  - Mike Kroeger – lyrics, bass
  - Ryan Peake – lyrics, vocals, guitars
  - Ryan "Nik" Vikedal – drums
- Brian Larson – additional strings
- Cameron Wilson – additional strings
- Henry Lee – additional strings
- Zoltan Rozsnyai – additional strings
- Joey Moi – production, engineering, digital editing
- Randy Staub – mixing
- Zach Blackstone – mixing assistance
- Alex "Laquaysh" Aligizakis – assistant engineering
- Ryan Andersen – digital editing
- George Marino – mastering

== Charts ==
=== Weekly charts ===
Chart (2003–2004)	Peak position
Australia (ARIA)	4
Austria (Ö3 Austria Top 40)	11
Belgium (Ultratop 50 Flanders)	31
Belgium (Ultratip Bubbling Under Wallonia)	12
Canada (Nielsen SoundScan)	1
Europe (Eurochart Hot 100)	16
France (SNEP)	61
Germany (GfK)	26
Hungary (Editors' Choice Top 40)	31
Ireland (IRMA)	18
Italy (FIMI)	9
Netherlands (Dutch Top 40)	11
Netherlands (Single Top 100)	38
New Zealand (Recorded Music NZ)	9
Romania (Romanian Top 100)	79
Scottish Singles Sales (Official Charts)	6
Sweden (Sverigetopplistan)	35
Switzerland (Schweizer Hitparade)	14
UK Singles (Official Charts)	6
UK Rock & Metal (Official Charts)	1
US Billboard Hot 100	7
US Adult Pop Airplay (Billboard)	1
US Alternative Airplay (Billboard)	4
US Mainstream Rock Airplay (Billboard)	2
US Pop Airplay (Billboard)	2

=== Year-end charts ===
Chart (2003)	Position
Australia (ARIA)	23
New Zealand (RIANZ)	49
Switzerland (Schweizer Hitparade)	98
UK Singles (OCC)	111
US Adult Top 40 (Billboard)	62
US Mainstream Rock Tracks (Billboard)	16
US Modern Rock Tracks (Billboard)	31

Chart (2004)	Position
US Billboard Hot 100	17
US Adult Top 40 (Billboard)	3
US Mainstream Top 40 (Billboard)	11
US Modern Rock Tracks (Billboard)	95

== Certifications ==
Region	Certification	Certified units/sales
Australia (ARIA)	Platinum	70,000^{^}
Canada (Music Canada)	2× Platinum	160,000^{‡}
Denmark (IFPI Danmark)	Gold	45,000^{‡}
New Zealand (RMNZ)	Platinum	30,000^{‡}
United Kingdom (BPI)	Gold	400,000^{‡}
United States (RIAA)	Platinum	1,000,000^{‡}
^{*} Sales figures based on certification alone.^{^} Shipments figures based on certification alone.^{‡} Sales+streaming figures based on certification alone.

== Release history ==
Region	Date	Format(s)	Label(s)	Ref.
United States	28 July 2003	Modern rock radio	Roadrunner	
Japan	29 August 2003	CD	Roadrunner	
Australia	1 September 2003	CD	Roadrunner	
United States	8 September 2003	Contemporary hit; hot AC; triple-A radio	Roadrunner	
United Kingdom	15 September 2003	CD	Roadrunner	
