= Eldebrock =

Canadian rock band formed 2009

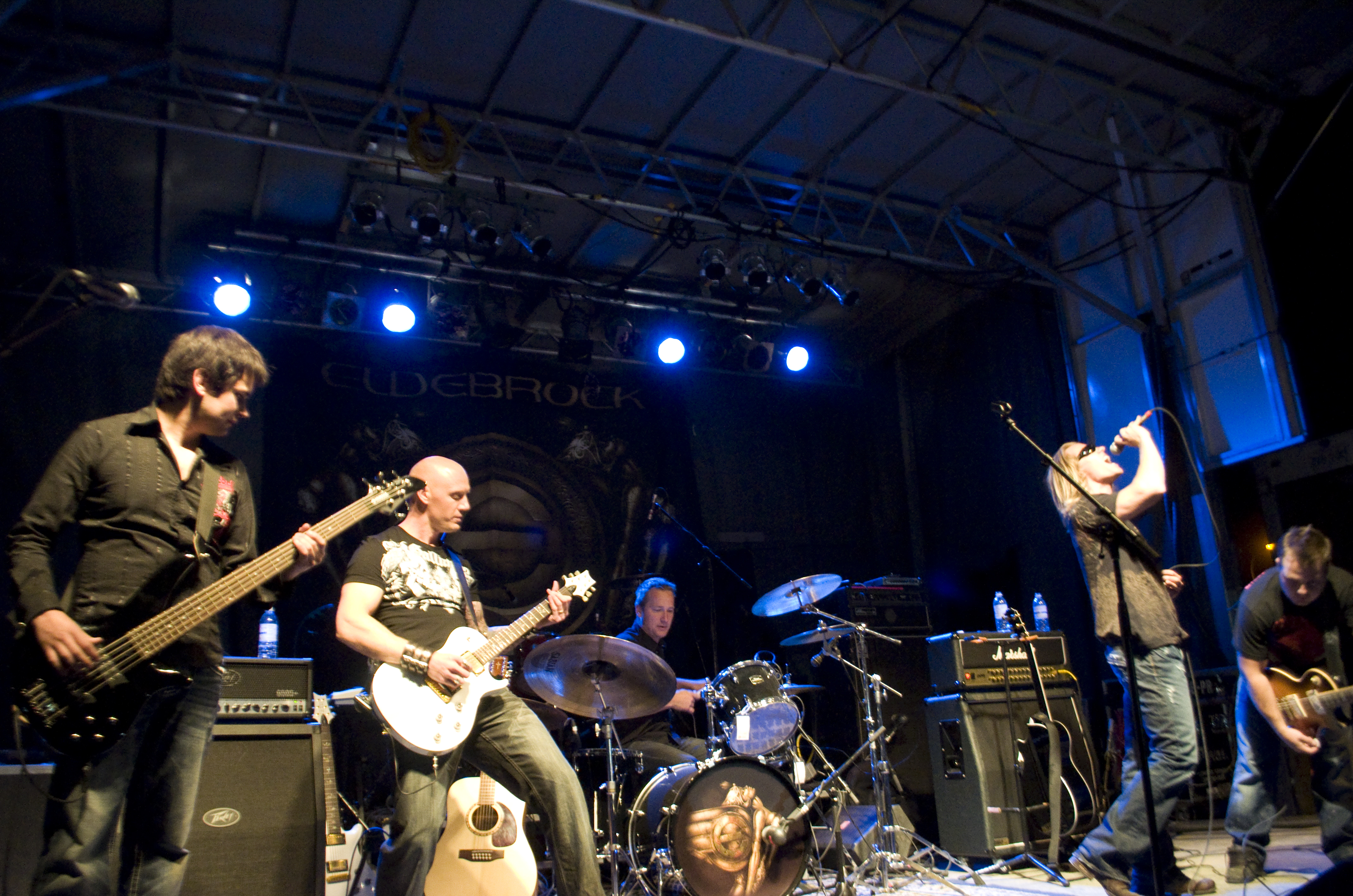
- Eldebrock performing live in 2010

Background information
- Origin: Saskatoon, Saskatchewan, Canada
- Genres: Post-Grunge
- Years active: 2009–present
- Members: Jay Wegenast; Del Bannerman; Barrett Moore; Richard Lalonde; Shawn Bannerman

Eldebrock is a Canadian rock band, formed in Saskatoon in 2009. The group consists of lead vocalist Jay Wegenast, lead guitarist Barrett Moore, rhythm guitarist Del Bannerman, bass guitarist Richard Lalonde and drummer Shawn Bannerman.

In September 2010, they released their self-titled debut album.

== History ==
Originally formed by Del Bannerman and Richard Lalonde, the band started to take shape in early 2009 when lead singer Jay Wegenast was recruited. After spending most of 2009 writing material in small town Saskatchewan, the band recruited Jay's childhood friend, Barrett Moore. Moore added his own touch of 1980s-influenced guitar leads, and the band was ready to enter the studio in February 2010. Eventually, Del's cousin Shawn Bannerman was asked to join, rounding out the current lineup.

In the spring of 2010, the band started recording their first studio album. It was produced by Ryan Anderson, whose credits include Nickelback's The Long Road and All the Right Reasons, and mixed by Michael Wagener (Ozzy Osbourne, Metallica, Skid Row) in Nashville.

On June 15, 2010, the band released their first single entitled "Release Me". The song received airplay across Western Canada.

== Awards ==
Eldebrock was nominated for an Interactive Media Award for website design. They were presented with the "Best in Class" award under the music category. The band worked closely with Andy Screen from Anjara Design, based out of the UK. Del Bannerman was quoted as saying "All those sleepless night were worth it and we couldn’t have done it without Andy's help."

== Philanthropy ==
In 2010 the band received heart-breaking news: Del's uncle, who was set to be the band's tour bus driver, was diagnosed with bone cancer. This led to the band deciding to partner with the UICC and creating the World War on Cancer. They decided to donate $1 from every record sale to the UICC, which is the leading non-governmental organization dedicated to the control and prevention of cancer.

== Discography ==
- Eldebrock (2010)
