= Everything Under the Sun (Nickelback album) =

Studio album by Nickelback
- Released: October 30, 2026
- Recorded: 2024–2026
- Genres: Hard rock; pop rock
- Length: 44:38
- Label: Virgin
- Producers: Chris Baseford; Mitchy Collins; Chris Holmes; Chad Kroeger; One Love; Ryan Peake; Ido Zmishlany

Nickelback chronology
Get Rollin' (2022)	Everything Under the Sun (2026)

Singles from Everything Under the Sun
- 1. "Bones for the Crows" Released: March 20, 2026; 2. "Rattle the Cage" Released: July 14, 2026; 3. "Leave Me Behind" Released: August 21, 2026; 4. "Make Me Love You" Released: September 24, 2026; 5. "If I Don't Go" Released: October 30, 2026

Everything Under the Sun is the eleventh studio album by the Canadian rock band Nickelback. It was released on October 30, 2026, by Virgin Music Group. The album is co-produced by the band's longtime collaborator Chris Baseford and frontman Chad Kroeger.

Everything Under the Sun serves as a follow-up to their tenth album, Get Rollin' (2022). It also follows their documentary, Hate to Love: Nickelback, and their 2023 induction into the Canadian Music Hall of Fame.

== Background ==
Everything Under the Sun was officially announced on July 14, 2026, alongside the release of the album's second single, "Rattle the Cage", featuring Mötley Crüe guitarist John 5. The album is the band's debut release for Virgin Music Group, after releasing their previous two records through BMG.

"Bones for the Crows" is also featured on the album. The track was released as a single in 2026, three years after appearing in the 2023 video game Dungeon Hunter 6.

When describing the album, lead singer and guitarist Chad Kroeger stated, "This album has every side of the band on it. There are songs that hit as hard as anything we've ever done, songs that take chances, and songs that remind us why we've been doing this together for so long".

The track "Lift Somebody Up" features Sammy Hagar, Shinedown members Brent Smith and Zach Myers, Mötley Crüe drummer Tommy Lee, Anthrax drummer Charlie Benante and guitarist Joe Bonamassa. The track "Technicolor Steamboat" features actor Ryan Reynolds on vocals.

The cover art depicts a nebula behind a drawing of a gear of the Antikythera mechanism with various sun symbols depicted around its perimeter, including the Zia sun, circled dot, sun wheel, and sunburst. Other symbols depicted include the triskelion and thunderbolt.

Everything Under the Sun is Nickelback's longest album since their debut album Curb. The band also issued "If I Don't Go" as a single on the album's release date.

== Critical reception ==
Professional ratings
Aggregate scores
Source	Rating
Metacritic	75/100
Review scores
Source	Rating
AllMusic	4/5 stars
Blabbermouth.net	8/10
Classic Rock	4/5 stars
Kerrang!	3/5
Sputnikmusic	2.7/5
Stereoboard	2/5 stars

According to the review aggregator Metacritic, Everything Under the Sun received "generally favorable reviews" based on a weighted average score of 75 out of 100 from four critic scores.

== Track listing ==
Everything Under the Sun track listing
No.	Title	Writer(s)	Producer(s)	Length
1.	"Rattle the Cage" (featuring John 5)	Chad Kroeger; Simon Clow	C. Kroeger; Chris Baseford	3:55
2.	"Bones for the Crows"	C. Kroeger	C. Kroeger; Baseford	4:05
3.	"I Already Know"	C. Kroeger; Michael Kroeger; Ryan Peake; Ido Zmishlany	C. Kroeger; Baseford; Zmishlany	4:27
4.	"Leave Me Behind"	C. Kroeger; Nicholas Durocher; James William Connor Riddell	C. Kroeger; Baseford; Chris Holmes	3:47
5.	"If I Don't Go"	C. Kroeger; Jordan Harvey; Austin Jenckes; Austin Nivarel	C. Kroeger; Baseford	3:33
6.	"Make Me Love You"	C. Kroeger; Dallas Davidson; Kyle Fishman; Ernest Keith Smith; Justin Wilson	C. Kroeger; Baseford	3:35
7.	"Chasin' Famous"	C. Kroeger	C. Kroeger; Baseford	3:12
8.	"Simple Song"	C. Kroeger; Peake; Carlos de la Garza	C. Kroeger; Peake; Baseford	4:15
9.	"Technicolor Steamboat"	C. Kroeger; Heather Shirley	C. Kroeger; Baseford	3:15
10.	"Lift Somebody Up" (featuring Sammy Hagar, Joe Bonamassa, Brent Smith, Zach Myers, Charlie Benante, and Tommy Lee)	C. Kroeger	C. Kroeger; Baseford; Holmes	3:33
11.	"Bottled Dreams"	C. Kroeger	C. Kroeger; Baseford	3:43
12.	"Last Night Was Fun"	C. Kroeger; Mitch Collins; Jeremy Dussolliet; Larzz Principato; Tim Sommers	Mitchy Collins; One Love	3:20
Total length:				44:38

Japan bonus track
No.	Title	Length
13.	"I Would Have Left You"	3:32

Deluxe digital album
No.	Title	Length
13.	"Call Me"	3:00
14.	"Heart I Didn't Break"	2:42
15.	"Up to No Good"	3:15

== Personnel ==
Credits are adapted from Tidal.

=== Nickelback ===
- Daniel Adair – drums (all tracks), vocals (track 9)
- Chad Kroeger – vocals, guitar
- Mike Kroeger – bass
- Ryan Peake – vocals (1–6, 8, 13 (Japan bonus track), 13-15), guitar (1–4, 8, 9, 13-15)

=== Additional musicians ===
- John 5 – guitar (1)
- Chris Baseford – guitar (2, 3, 5, 10), keyboards (2, 5, 9); background vocals, string ensemble (2)
- Tim Galloway – acoustic guitar (2), guitar (9)
- Ian Thornley – guitar (2)
- Mark Siegel – keyboards (3, 8, 12), background vocals (3)
- Ido Zmishlany – background vocals, keyboards (3)
- Nicholas Durocher – background vocals (4)
- Jordan Harvey – background vocals, guitar (5)
- Randy Slaugh – keyboards, string ensemble (6)
- Rock Choir – choir vocals (8)
- Chris Mutch-Jones – choir direction (8)
- Sam Smith – choir direction (8)
- Ryan Reynolds – vocals (9)
- Charlie Benante – drums (10)
- Tommy Lee – drums (10)
- Joe Bonamassa – guitar (10)
- Zach Myers – guitar (10)
- Brent Smith – vocals (10)
- Sammy Hagar – vocals (10)
- Avalon Kroeger – vocals (11)

=== Technical ===
- Chris Baseford – engineering, mixing
- Chris "Hollywood" Holmes – engineering
- Irene Genova – sound editing, mixing assistance (all tracks); engineering assistance (2)
- Noah Gottdenker – engineering assistance (3)
- Alex Kalteziotis – engineering assistance (10)
- Sam Garzarian – engineering assistance (10)
- Dawson Kroeger – engineering assistance (11)
- Pete Lyman – mastering (1, 2, 4, 7, 10–12)
- Randy Merrill – mastering (3, 5, 6, 8)
- Shay Obray – mastering assistance (1, 2, 4, 7, 10–12)

== Charts ==
Chart performance for Everything Under the Sun
Chart (2026)	Peak position
Australian Albums (ARIA)	3
Austrian Albums (Ö3 Austria)	4
Belgian Albums (Ultratop Flanders)	24
Belgian Albums (Ultratop Wallonia)	25
Canadian Albums (Billboard)	10
Dutch Albums (Album Top 100)	49
French Albums (SNEP)	135
French Rock & Metal Albums (SNEP)	10
German Albums (Offizielle Top 100)	6
German Rock & Metal Albums (Offizielle Top 100)	2
Irish Independent Albums (IRMA)	21
Japanese Albums (Oricon)	39
Japanese Combined Albums (Oricon)	83
Japanese Rock Albums (Oricon)	9
Polish Albums (ZPAV)	76
Scottish Albums (Official Charts)	3
Swedish Hard Rock Albums (Sverigetopplistan)	10
Swiss Albums (Schweizer Hitparade)	4
UK Albums (Official Charts)	6
UK Independent Albums (Official Charts)	4
UK Rock & Metal Albums (Official Charts)	1
US Billboard 200	29
US Independent Albums (Billboard)	5
US Top Rock & Alternative Albums (Billboard)	8
