= Because of You (Nickelback song) =

2004 single by Nickelback

Single by Nickelback

from the album The Long Road
- Released: September 6, 2004
- Length: 3:30
- Label: Roadrunner
- Songwriters: Chad Kroeger; Mike Kroeger; Ryan Peake; Ryan Vikedal

Nickelback singles chronology
"Feelin' Way Too Damn Good" (2004)	"Because of You" (2004)	"Photograph" (2005)

"Because of You" is a song by Canadian rock band Nickelback. It was released in September 2004 as the fourth single from their 2003 album The Long Road. The song was included in the MX vs. ATV Unleashed soundtrack.

== Charts ==
Chart (2004–2005)	Peak position
Canada Rock Top 30 (Radio & Records)	13
US Billboard Mainstream Rock Tracks	6

== Track listing ==
1. "Because of You""
