= Get Rollin' =

Studio album by Nickelback
- Released: November 18, 2022
- Recorded: 2021–2022
- Studio: Mountain View Studios (Abbotsford, British Columbia)
- Genres: Post-grunge; hard rock; alternative rock; alternative metal; pop rock
- Length: 41:02
- Labels: Nickelback II Productions; BMG
- Producers: Nickelback; Chris Baseford

Nickelback chronology
Feed the Machine (2017)	Get Rollin' (2022)	Live from Nashville (2024)

Singles from Get Rollin'
- 1. "San Quentin" Released: September 7, 2022; 2. "Those Days" Released: October 5, 2022; 3. "High Time" Released: November 14, 2022; 4. "Skinny Little Missy" Released: October 6, 2023; 5. "Horizon" Released: December 18, 2024; 6. "Tidal Wave" Released: January 31, 2025

Get Rollin' is the tenth studio album by Canadian rock band Nickelback. The album was released on November 18, 2022. The album's lead single "San Quentin" was released on September 7, 2022, accompanied by an official lyric video. On May 12, 2023, Nickelback announced an expanded deluxe edition of the album will be released on June 3, 2023, with an alternate blue cover. It was their first album since The Long Road (2003) to miss the top five on the US Billboard 200. It is their first album in over five years since 2017's Feed the Machine (2017).

== Background ==
In early 2019, band members spoke of recording a tenth studio album, though Chad Kroeger conceded there was no timetable or rush for the band to complete it. Mike Kroeger spoke of his personal desire to move in more of a heavy metal direction, or wanting to do an album of Slayer cover songs.

On August 14, 2020, the band released a cover of the Charlie Daniels Band song "The Devil Went Down to Georgia", featuring Dave Martone.

During a July 2021 interview, bassist Mike Kroeger commented when asked about the band's progress on new music: "That is happening right now" he said of the forthcoming LP. "Music is being composed and recorded up in Canada. We were out there, and something came up and our producer had to take some time off. So I took that opportunity to return (home) to Los Angeles with family and spend a little bit of time at home. But I'll be headed back up there in a couple of weeks to pick it up again". When the subject of a release date came up, Mike said "it'll be done when it's done", explaining that he and band would rather not be confined to a timescale for fear of making "a shitty record". "Release dates are primarily arrived at by business interests, like record labels and whatever. We don't have one of those", he said. "We've been managing ourselves for about a year. So, the answer is no. We're doing it on our schedule, at our own pace, and it'll be done when it's done. 'Cause we've blown up deadlines in the past lots of times. Because we feel that you can make a good record and be late, but you can't, or you shouldn't, make a shitty record to be on time. So we won't be pressed for time.

Professional ratings
Aggregate scores
Source	Rating
Metacritic	71/100
Review scores
Source	Rating
AllMusic	3.5/5 stars
Blabbermouth	8/10
Classic Rock	4/5 stars
Exclaim!	6/10
Kerrang!	4/5 stars
The Telegraph	2/5 stars

== Promotion and release ==
On August 31, 2022, video of the band's video-shoot for the lead single "San Quentin" was posted online by fans who attended video-shoot via their social media posts. The single was released on September 7, 2022.

The second single "Those Days" was released on October 5, 2022, followed by a music video on October 26.

The Third Single Called High Time was released in November 14 2022 "High Time" with the Music Video. The Fourth Single called "Skinny Little Missy" was Released: October 6, 2023, BUT Sadly there is NO Music Video with it.

On December 18 2024, the band released a music video for the track "Horizon", directed by Andy Brown.

During an interview with WRAT radio station, lead vocalist Chad Kroeger spoke about the lyrical inspiration for "San Quentin", saying: "I met the San Quentin prison warden at a party. And I couldn't believe how young he was. I was, like, 'There's just no way that you're the warden of San Quentin', and everyone was, like, 'Yup. He is'. Guy Fieri's a buddy of mine, and I was at his birthday party a few years back. And the entire time we were talking, I'm speaking to this guy, but in my head all I could think about was, 'I'm gonna write a song called 'San Quentin'. That's it'. And I stuck it in my notes in my phone. And then once the riff was down, I think I screamed out this line, 'Can somebody please keep me the hell out of San Quentin?' And we just took it from there".

"San Quentin" has been featured in the credits of Velma season one.

== Track listing ==
Get Rollin' track listing
No.	Title	Writer(s)	Length
1.	"San Quentin"	Chad Kroeger	3:31
2.	"Skinny Little Missy"	C. Kroeger	3:37
3.	"Those Days"	C. Kroeger; Ryan Peake	3:39
4.	"High Time"	C. Kroeger; Jeff Johnson; Mike Kroeger; Simon Clow	3:54
5.	"Vegas Bomb"	C. Kroeger	3:45
6.	"Tidal Wave"	C. Kroeger; Chris Baseford; Peake	3:32
7.	"Does Heaven Even Know You're Missing?"	C. Kroeger	3:43
8.	"Steel Still Rusts"	C. Kroeger	4:27
9.	"Horizon"	C. Kroeger; Jennifer Denmark; Troy Cartwright; Zach Abend	3:15
10.	"Standing in the Dark"	C. Kroeger; Arnold Lanni	4:01
11.	"Just One More"	C. Kroeger; Coleman Hell; Rob Benvegnu	3:38
Total length:			41:02

Deluxe edition bonus tracks
No.	Title	Length
12.	"High Time" (acoustic)	3:43
13.	"Does Heaven Even Know You're Missing?" (acoustic)	3:43
14.	"Just One More" (acoustic)	3:38
15.	"Horizon" (acoustic)	3:17
16.	"Steel Still Rusts" (acoustic; Japan bonus track)	4:25
Total length:		56:20

Expanded deluxe edition bonus tracks
No.	Title	Length
12.	"San Quentin" (live from Starland Ballroom)	4:12
13.	"Those Days" (live from History)	4:35
14.	"Those Days" (acoustic)	3:47
15.	"High Time" (acoustic)	3:43
16.	"Tidal Wave" (acoustic)	3:32
17.	"Does Heaven Even Know You're Missing?" (acoustic)	3:43
18.	"Steel Still Rusts" (acoustic)	4:25
19.	"Horizon" (acoustic)	3:17
20.	"Standing in the Dark" (acoustic)	3:54
21.	"Just One More" (acoustic)	3:38

== Personnel ==
Nickelback

- Chad Kroeger – lead vocals, guitar, production
- Ryan Peake – guitar, vocals, production
- Mike Kroeger – bass guitar, production
- Daniel Adair – drums, vocals, production

Additional personnel

- Chris Baseford – production, mixing
- Jeff Johnson – production (tracks 3, 4)
- Ted Jensen – mastering
- Ricardo Germain – engineering
- Jessica Schmidt – production assistance
- Andrew Cruz – mixing assistance, digital editing
- Justin Schturz – mastering assistance
- Chris "Hollywood" Holmes – digital editing
- Ian Thornley – solo guitar (track 2)

== Charts ==
Chart performance for Get Rollin'
Chart (2022)	Peak position
Australian Albums (ARIA)	3
Austrian Albums (Ö3 Austria)	8
Belgian Albums (Ultratop Flanders)	40
Belgian Albums (Ultratop Wallonia)	149
Canadian Albums (Billboard)	4
Dutch Albums (Album Top 100)	92
German Albums (Offizielle Top 100)	7
Italian Albums (FIMI)	75
Japanese Albums (Oricon)	20
Japanese Digital Albums (Oricon)	11
Japanese Hot Albums (Billboard Japan)	20
New Zealand Albums (RMNZ)	31
Scottish Albums (Official Charts)	7
Spanish Albums (Promusicae)	91
Swiss Albums (Schweizer Hitparade)	1
UK Albums (Official Charts)	8
UK Independent Albums (Official Charts)	1
UK Rock & Metal Albums (Official Charts)	1
US Billboard 200	30
US Independent Albums (Billboard)	3
US Top Alternative Albums (Billboard)	4
US Top Rock Albums (Billboard)	5
