= Never Again (Nickelback song) =

2002 single by Nickelback

Single by Nickelback

from the album Silver Side Up
- Released: July 8, 2002
- Studio: Greenhouse (Burnaby, British Columbia)
- Genre: Hard rock
- Length: 4:20
- Label: Roadrunner
- Songwriters: Chad Kroeger; Mike Kroeger; Ryan Peake; Ryan Vikedal
- Producers: Rick Parashar; Nickelback

Nickelback singles chronology
"Too Bad" (2002)	"Never Again" (2002)	"Someday" (2003)

Music video
- "Never Again" on YouTube

"Never Again" is a song by Canadian rock band Nickelback, released on July 8, 2002, as the third and final single from their third studio album, Silver Side Up (2001). The song became a No. 1 hit on the US Billboard Mainstream Rock Tracks chart, making it the band's third straight number one on this chart.

== Composition ==
"Never Again" is a hard rock song written by all four members of the band. The song is about domestic violence from a child's point of view, but was not drawn from personal experience.

== Music video ==
Nickelback originally had a music video made for the song, but the video was scrapped due to its violent nature. Instead, footage from Live at Home was shown as an alternative.

== Track listings ==
European CD single

1. "Never Again" (edit) – 3:41
2. "One Last Run" (live) – 3:35

European maxi-CD single

1. "Never Again" (single version) – 3:42
2. "One Last Run" (live) – 3:35
3. "Worthy to Say" (live) – 5:53
4. "Never Again" (video)

European CD digipak single

1. "Never Again" (full-length single version) – 4:22
2. "Breathe" (live) – 4:05
3. "Old Enough" (live) – 3:55

== Charts ==
=== Weekly charts ===
Chart (2002)	Peak position
Canada Radio (Nielsen BDS)	34
Europe (Eurochart Hot 100)	98
Ireland (IRMA)	38
Scottish Singles Sales (Official Charts)	29
UK Singles (Official Charts)	30
UK Rock & Metal (Official Charts)	2
US Bubbling Under Hot 100 (Billboard)	24
US Alternative Airplay (Billboard)	24
US Mainstream Rock Airplay (Billboard)	1

=== Year-end charts ===
Chart (2002)	Position
US Mainstream Rock Tracks (Billboard)	13
US Modern Rock Tracks (Billboard)	86

== Certifications ==
Region	Certification	Certified units/sales
United States (RIAA)	Gold	500,000^{‡}
^{‡} Sales+streaming figures based on certification alone.

== Release history ==
Region	Date	Format(s)	Label(s)	Ref.
United States	July 8, 2002	Mainstream rock; active rock; alternative radio	Roadrunner	
United Kingdom	November 25, 2002	CD	Roadrunner	
