= San Quentin (song) =

Single by Nickelback

from the album Get Rollin'
- Released: September 7, 2022
- Recorded: 2021
- Genre: Hard rock; heavy metal
- Length: 3:31
- Label: Nickelback II Productions Inc.; BMG
- Songwriter: Chad Kroeger
- Producers: Nickelback; Chris Baseford

Nickelback singles chronology
"The Devil Went Down to Georgia" (2020)	"San Quentin" (2022)	"Those Days" (2022)

"San Quentin" is a song by Canadian rock band Nickelback from their tenth studio album, Get Rollin'. It was released as the album's lead single on September 7, 2022.

== Musical style ==
"San Quentin" is described as a hard rock and heavy metal song with elements of metalcore.

== Background ==
During an interview with WRAT radio station, lead vocalist Chad Kroeger spoke about the lyrical inspiration for "San Quentin", saying: "I met the San Quentin prison warden at a party. And I couldn't believe how young he was. I was, like, 'There's just no way that you're the warden of San Quentin', and everyone was, like, 'Yup. He is'. Guy Fieri's a buddy of mine, and I was at his birthday party a few years back. And the entire time we were talking, I'm speaking to this guy, but in my head all I could think about was, 'I'm gonna write a song called 'San Quentin'. That's it'. And I stuck it in my notes in my phone. And then once the riff was down, I think I screamed out this line, 'Can somebody please keep me the hell out of San Quentin?' And we just took it from there".

== Release ==
On August 26, 2022, students attending school at Simon Fraser University in Burnaby, British Columbia received a newsletter stating they were invited to attend and participate in a video shoot Nickelback will be hosting on August 30, 2022 for their forthcoming single, outside the Convocation Mall on campus.

In August 2022, Nickelback began posting small snippets and teasers of new music via their official social media accounts with the date "09.07.2022" being branded on the posts. "San Quentin" was officially released to radio and digital music retailers along with the official lyric video via YouTube on September 7, 2022. On September 14, 2022, a music video for the song was released.

== Charts ==
=== Weekly charts ===
Weekly chart performance for "San Quentin"
Chart (2022–2023)	Peak position
Australia Digital Tracks (ARIA)	21
Canada Hot 100 (Billboard)	64
Canada Rock (Billboard)	2
Czech Republic Rock (IFPI)	13
Finland Airplay (Radiosoittolista)	92
Germany Airplay (TopHit)	41
New Zealand Hot Singles (RMNZ)	35
UK Singles Downloads (Official Charts)	77
UK Singles Sales (OCC)	77
US Hot Rock & Alternative Songs (Billboard)	26
US Rock & Alternative Airplay (Billboard)	8

=== Year-end charts ===
Year-end chart performance for "San Quentin"
Chart (2023)	Position
US Rock Airplay (Billboard)	27

== Certifications ==
Certifications for "San Quentin"
Region	Certification	Certified units/sales
Canada (Music Canada)	Gold	40,000^{‡}
United States (RIAA)	Gold	500,000^{‡}
^{‡} Sales+streaming figures based on certification alone.
