= 2002 in British music =

This is a summary of 2002 in music in the United Kingdom.

== Summary ==
British and Irish bands that did well in the charts included Stereophonics, the Chemical Brothers, and Westlife; the latter topped the charts for a record 10th time, matching Madonna. They also were the quickest act to obtain 10 chart toppers, with only 35 months between this and their first.

The fastest-selling debut single in UK chart history was released by the Winner of the TV talent show, Pop Idol; Will Young had been voted as the winner by over 4 million people in the final, after winning six out of the nine weeks, with Gareth Gates, the eventual runner-up, winning three times. "Anything is Possible/Evergreen", topped the charts for 3 weeks and sold over 1.1 million copies in its first week of sale; altogether it sold over 1.7 million copies, becoming the 11th biggest-selling single in the UK and also the second fastest-selling single in the UK, with only Elton John's "Candle in the Wind" ahead of it. Young reached the top again with his second single "Light My Fire".

Runner-up Gareth Gates scored a No. 1 with his debut single, "Unchained Melody", spending one week more at the top than Will Young, thought the single itself sold less than Will Young's; nonetheless it became the 77th million-selling single in the UK and the last one until 2004. Overall, it is the 37th biggest selling single in the UK. Gates also had a second No.1 single, "Anyone Of Us (Stupid Mistake)", which topped the charts for 3 weeks, bettering Will Young by one week once again. Darius Danesh, third in Pop Idol, also made No 1 with "Colourblind". After both having two chart toppers, Young and Gates joined forces and revived an old Beatles classic, "The Long and Winding Road".

UK girl group Sugababes (who were now under their second line-up of original members Keisha Buchanan, Mutya Buena and former Atomic Kitten member Heidi Range, who replaced Siobhán Donaghy after her departure the previous year) scored their first UK number one with "Freak like Me". Ronan Keating also returned to the top of the singles chart with a cover of "If Tomorrow Never Comes". Liberty X, consisting of the five losers who just failed to make Hear'Say in the talent show Popstars, reached No. 1 with Just a Little, eventually becoming more successful than Hear'Say, who disbanded in October. S Club Juniors, an 8-piece pre-teen spin off from S Club 7 (who saw the departure of band member Paul Cattermole earlier that year) reached No 2 with their debut single One Step Closer.

The Sugababes hit the top for a second time with their sixth single, "Round Round". Like their first No. 1 single, it only spent a week at the summit. The song was taken from the soundtrack to the hit film, "The Guru". Specialising in pop and R&B with garage influences, all-male act Blazin' Squad entered atop the charts with their massively hyped debut single, "Crossroads". They would go on to have five more top 10 singles, though their two albums charted near the low end of the top 40 on the albums chart.

Coldplay released their second album, a follow-up to Parachutes; A Rush of Blood to the Head included several hit singles and they became one of the few early 2000s era British acts to achieve fame and popularity in the US. Having previously topped the singles charts twice, Atomic Kitten also scored a No. 1 album with their third release, Feels So Good, which spawned two top 3 hits as well as their 3rd chart topper.

Twelve months after topping the charts with his debut single, Daniel Bedingfield returned with a slow ballad, "If You're Not The One". It became his 2nd UK No. 1, and his debut album, Gotta Get Thru This, produced five Top 10 singles and six Top 40 hits. Boy band Blue reached the top of the UK charts for the third time, collaborating with Elton John to revive an old hit of his, "Sorry Seems To Be The Hardest Word".

A notable charity single that reached the top 20 was "Nothing Sacred – A Song for Kirsty" by Russell Watson. The campaign raised money for the Francis House Children's Hospital, and was inspired by Kirsty Howard, an eight-year old with a rare heart condition. The song peaked at number 17 and sales contributed to the £5million target for the Kirsty Appeal achieved in 2006.

Popstars: The Rivals became the new phenomenon in the world of talent shows, producing two new acts, boy band One True Voice and girl group Girls Aloud. They both released their singles in Christmas week and the girls beat the boys to the top spot, claiming the Christmas number one with "Sound of the Underground". Robbie Williams took the Christmas number one album spot yet again with his fifth No. 1 album, Escapology.

== Events ==
- 1 January – Eric Clapton marries his 25-year-old American girlfriend in a surprise wedding ceremony at a church in the English village of Ripley, Surrey.
- 14 January – Adam Ant is committed to a psychiatric hospital two days after being arrested for carrying a firearm into a London pub that Ant claims was fake.
- 1 March – Singer Doreen Waddell dies after being hit by three vehicles in Shoreham-By-Sea. She was 36.
- 14 May – We Will Rock You, a jukebox musical based on the songs of Queen, opens at the Dominion Theatre in London's West End.
- 23 May – The Classical Brits award ceremony takes place. The most successful British performers are Sir Colin Davis, Russell Watson and Guy Johnston.
- 1 June
  - Graham Coxon leaves Blur during Think Tank's recording sessions, after tensions with the other members mainly due to its alleged alcohol problems and disagreement about the choice of Fatboy Slim as producer. Coxon only contributed in one song, Battery in Your Leg. He was later "replaced" on tour by Simon Tong, former guitarist of The Verve.
  - The Prom at the Palace is held in London to commemorate the Golden Jubilee of Elizabeth II. Performers include the BBC Symphony Orchestra, the BBC Symphony Chorus, Kiri Te Kanawa, Angela Gheorghiu and Roberto Alagna.
- 3 June – The Libertines release their debut single "What A Waster", which receives very little airplay due to the profanity used in the song. It charts at No.37 in the Official Singles Chart.
- 11 June – Paul McCartney marries second wife Heather Mills in a lavish ceremony at Castle Leslie in Ireland.
- 27 June – The Who bassist John Entwistle is found dead in a Las Vegas hotel room on the eve of the band's new tour. He was 57.
- 30 June – The Glastonbury Festival features headline acts Coldplay, Garbage, Stereophonics, Orbital, Roger Waters, Rod Stewart, and Air.
- August – Nicola Benedetti wins the "Brilliant Prodigy" Competition, broadcast by Carlton Television.
- 1 October – Hear'Say split up, 20 months after their formation, and citing "abuse from the public" as their main reason, as well as admitting to being "a passing fad".
- 29 November – Concert For George is held at the Royal Albert Hall in London, as a memorial to George Harrison on the first anniversary of his death, under the musical direction of friend Eric Clapton.

Performers included Paul McCartney, Ringo Starr, Clapton, Jeff Lynne, Ravi Shankar, and Billy Preston. The event benefitted the Material World Charitable Foundation.

== Television ==
Howard Goodall follows up his earlier successful TV series Howard Goodall's Big Bangs with Howard Goodall's Great Dates, in which he focused on significant dates in the history of music.

== Classical works ==
- Derek Bourgeois – Symphony No. 9
- Peter Maxwell Davies – Naxos Quartet No. 1
- Patrick Hawes – Blue in Blue
- Tolga Kashif – Queen Symphony

== Film scores and incidental music ==
- Patrick Hawes – The Incredible Mrs Ritchie

== Deaths ==
- 4 January – Peter Hemmings, operatic bass and impresario, 67
- 7 January – Jon Lee, Feeder drummer, 33 (suicide)
- 22 January – Peter Bardens, keyboard player, 57
- 14 February – Mick Tucker, drummer of Sweet, 54
- 1 March – Doreen Waddell, singer, 36 (car accident)
- 4 March – Eric Flynn, actor and singer, 62 (cancer)
- 27 March – Dudley Moore, comedian, composer, pianist and actor, 66 (progressive supranuclear palsy)
- 3 April – Fad Gadget, singer, 45
- 15 April – William Reed, pianist and composer, 91
- 18 April – Cy Laurie, clarinettist and bandleader, 76
- 7 May – Monica Sinclair, operatic contralto, 77
- 16 May – James Dewar (musician), Scottish bassist, 59 (stroke)
- 27 June – John Entwistle, bassist of The Who, 57 (heart attack)
- 21 July – Gus Dudgeon, music producer, 59 (car accident)
- 17 August – Tony Zemaitis, guitar maker, 67
- 27 August – George Mitchell, musician who devised The Black and White Minstrel Show, 85
- 9 October – Joan Mary Last, music educator, author and composer, 94
- 17 October – Derek Bell, harpist (The Chieftains), 66
- 3 November – Lonnie Donegan, skiffle musician, 71
- 20 November – George Guest, organist and choirmaster of St John's College, Cambridge, 78
- 27 November – Stanley Black, pianist, bandleader, composer, conductor and arranger, 89
- 3 December – Sidney Sager, trombonist, conductor and composer, 85
- 22 December – Joe Strummer, singer and guitarist of The Clash, 50
- 24 December – Jake Thackray, singer-songwriter, 64 (heart failure).
- 31 December – Kevin MacMichael, Canadian guitarist of British band Cutting Crew, 51 (lung cancer)
- date unknown – John McHugh, tenor, 93

== Music awards ==
=== BRIT Awards ===
The 2002 BRIT Awards winners were:

- Best British Male Solo Artist: Robbie Williams
- Best British Female Solo Artist: Dido
- Best British Group: Travis
- Best British Album: Dido: "No Angel"
- Best British Dance Act: Basement Jaxx
- Best British Newcomer: Blue
- Best International Male: Shaggy
- Best International Female: Kylie Minogue
- Best International Group: Destiny's Child
- Best International Newcomer: The Strokes
- Best International Album: Kylie Minogue – "Fever"
- Best British Video: So Solid Crew – "21 Seconds"
- Best British Single: S Club 7 – "Don't Stop Movin'"
- Best Pop Act: Westlife
- Outstanding Contribution: Sting

=== Classical BRITS ===
- Female Artist of the Year – Cecilia Bartoli
- Male Artist of the Year – Sir Colin Davis
- Album of the Year – Russell Watson – Encore
- Ensemble/Orchestral Album of the Year – Richard Hickox and London Symphony Orchestra – Vaughan Williams, A London Symphony
- Contemporary Music Award – Tan Dun – Crouching Tiger, Hidden Dragon
- Young British Classical Performer – Guy Johnston
- Critics' Award – Sir Colin Davis and London Symphony Orchestra – Berlioz, Les Troyens
- Biggest-selling Classical Album – Russell Watson – Encore
- Outstanding Contribution to Music – Andrea Bocelli

=== Mercury Music Prize ===
The 2002 Mercury Music Prize was awarded to Ms. Dynamite for her debut studio album A Little Deeper

=== Record of the Year ===
The Record of the Year was awarded to "Unchained Melody" by Gareth Gates.

== See also ==
- 2002 in British radio
- 2002 in British television
- 2002 in the United Kingdom
- List of British films of 2002
