= Silver Side Up =

2001 studio album by Nickelback

Studio album by Nickelback
- Released: September 11, 2001
- Recorded: April–June 2001
- Studios: Greenhouse Studios (Burnaby, Canada)
- Genres: Post-grunge; hard rock; alternative metal
- Length: 39:08
- Labels: Roadrunner; EMI (Canada)
- Producers: Nickelback; Rick Parashar

Nickelback chronology
| The State (1998) | Silver Side Up (2001) | The Long Road (2003) |

Singles from Silver Side Up
- 1. "How You Remind Me" Released: July 17, 2001; 2. "Too Bad" Released: February 2, 2002; 3. "Never Again" Released: July 8, 2002

"How You Remind Me"
Nickelback's "How You Remind Me" from Silver Side Up

Silver Side Up is the third studio album by Canadian rock band Nickelback, released on September 11, 2001. According to AllMusic, Silver Side Up continued Nickelback's tradition of "dark high-octane rock" from the band's first two albums. It reached number one in Canada, Austria, Ireland, New Zealand, and the United Kingdom. The album was certified 8× Platinum in Canada, 6× Platinum in the US, and 3× Platinum in the UK.

Nickelback toured the world in support of the album, which included their first UK arena tour. After returning from the tour, the band began work on The Long Road.

== Background ==
By 2000, Nickelback had begun to receive commercial success through performing their 1998 album The State and its lead single "Leader of Men". In early 2001, The State was certified Gold in Canada and had almost reached the same certification in America. At this time, Nickelback was planning to enter the studio to begin recording their third studio album. In March 2001, the band won their first Juno Award for Best New Group of the Year. In April 2001, they returned to the studio where The State was made, to begin recording Silver Side Up. Many of the songs from Silver Side Up were written before The State was released; some of them, including "Hangnail" and "Hollywood", had been played live and many fans already knew them before Silver Side Up was released. "Just For" was originally released on Curb as "Just Four" in 1996. According to Chad Kroeger during a Vegas concert in 2018, "Where Do I Hide?" is about a friend of his who would bust out of prison all the time and go back to Nickelback's hometown of Hanna, Alberta.

Nickelback took their time recording Silver Side Up, and eventually hired Rick Parashar to help them produce the album. By June 2001, the band had completed the record; they announced the lead single would be "How You Remind Me". Mike Kroeger, the bass player, wanted to release "Never Again", but the record label and bandmates decided "How You Remind Me" would be more appropriate. In July 2001, Nickelback sent "How You Remind Me" to rock radio stations. In August that year, Nickelback played their first German tour. In early September, the band set out to tour with their friends 3 Doors Down. While on tour, "How You Remind Me" reached number one on both the Billboard Mainstream Rock Tracks chart and the Modern Rock Tracks chart before Silver Side Up was officially released. The success of the album's lead single catapulted their previous album The State back onto the Billboard charts.

== Release and chart performance ==
Silver Side Up was released on September 11, 2001. It debuted at number two on the Billboard 200, behind Jay-Z's The Blueprint, selling 178,000 copies in the first week. The album debuted at number one in the Canadian Albums Chart, becoming Nickelback's first record to both enter and top the chart. The band decided to tour with Default and others in late 2001. Silver Side Up received Platinum status from the RIAA one month after its release, becoming Nickelback's first album to garner that distinction. In Canada, it also reached Platinum status, surpassing The State, which went Gold in January 2001.

In December 2001, "How You Remind Me" peaked at number one in the Billboard Hot 100, where it remained for four weeks. The song stayed in the top ten of the Billboard Hot 100 for 20 consecutive weeks. By the end of 2001, Silver Side Up had been awarded 2× Platinum status by the RIAA for selling two million copies in the United States. Follow-up singles were "Too Bad" and "Never Again", both of which reached number one on the rock charts, but failed to achieve the same success as "How You Remind Me".

In 2002, Nickelback toured worldwide to support Silver Side Up; they filmed a concert in their home province of Alberta, which the band released on DVD as Live at Home. The band won many Juno Awards and several Billboard Music Awards. "How You Remind Me" became the number one song of the Hot 100 of the year for 2002. By early 2003, the band was nominated for the American Music Awards. Nickelback also played at the American Music Awards. Silver Side Up was certified 6× Platinum by the RIAA and 8× Platinum by Music Canada.

In the United Kingdom, the album has sold over 1,117,000 copies as of June 2017.

== Reception ==
Professional ratings
Review scores
| Source | Rating |
|---|---|
| AllMusic | 4/5 stars |
| The Encyclopedia of Popular Music | 4/5 stars |
| Entertainment Weekly | C |
| Rolling Stone | 2/5 stars |
| The Rolling Stone Album Guide | 2.5/5 stars |
| Sputnikmusic | 3.5/5 |

As of December 22, 2010, the album had sold 5,666,000 copies in the U.S. According to IFPI, over 2,000,000 copies were sold in Europe and over 8,000,000 were sold worldwide by 2002. It was ranked 47th on Billboard's 200 Albums of the Decade.

The album received mixed reviews from critics. Rolling Stone critic Matt Diehl gave the album two out of five stars, stating, "Nearly every song seems trapped in the amber of early-Nineties Seattle aesthetics, the sonic equivalent of too many unfortunate goatees".

== Track listing ==
All lyrics are written by Chad Kroeger; all music is composed by Nickelback.

| No. | Title | Length |
|---|---|---|
| 1. | "Never Again" | 4:20 |
| 2. | "How You Remind Me" | 3:43 |
| 3. | "Woke Up This Morning" | 3:50 |
| 4. | "Too Bad" | 3:52 |
| 5. | "Just For^{[a]}" | 4:03 |
| 6. | "Hollywood" | 3:04 |
| 7. | "Money Bought" | 3:24 |
| 8. | "Where Do I Hide" | 3:38 |
| 9. | "Hangnail" | 3:54 |
| 10. | "Good Times Gone" | 5:18 |
| Total length: | | 39:10 |

^{a} Re-recording of "Just Four" from Curb (1996)

Japan bonus track
| No. | Title | Length |
|---|---|---|
| 11. | "Learn the Hard Way" (also appears as international bonus track on The Long Road) | 2:58 |

== Personnel ==
Nickelback

- Chad Kroeger – lead vocals, lead guitar (guitar solo on "Too Bad"), "Hollywood", and "Where Do I Hide", talk-box on "Woke Up This Morning"
- Ryan Peake – rhythm guitar, backing vocals
- Mike Kroeger – bass guitar
- Ryan Vikedal – drums, percussion

Additional musicians

- Ian Thornley – slide guitar on "Good Times Gone"

Artwork

- Daniel Moss – photography
- www.amoebacorp.com – album design, illustration

Production

- Rick Parashar – producer
- Randy Staub – mixing at Armoury Studios, Vancouver
- Geoff Ott – digital editing
- George Marino – mastering at Sterling Sound, New York City
- Joey Moi – engineer
- Pat "Sajak" Sharman – assistant engineer
- Alex Aligizakis – assistant mixing engineer, Pro Tools operator
- Kristina Ardron and Kevin Fairbairn – assistant engineers

== Charts ==
=== Weekly charts ===
| Chart (2001–2002) | Peak position |
|---|---|
| Australian Albums (ARIA) | 5 |
| Austrian Albums (Ö3 Austria) | 1 |
| Belgian Albums (Ultratop Flanders) | 2 |
| Belgian Albums (Ultratop Wallonia) | 6 |
| Canadian Albums (Billboard) | 1 |
| Canadian Metal Albums (Nielsen SoundScan) | 1 |
| Danish Albums (Hitlisten) | 4 |
| Dutch Albums (Album Top 100) | 15 |
| Europe (European Top 100 Albums) | 3 |
| Finnish Albums (Suomen virallinen lista) | 8 |
| French Albums (SNEP) | 15 |
| German Albums (Offizielle Top 100) | 4 |
| Hungarian Albums (MAHASZ) | 35 |
| Irish Albums (IRMA) | 1 |
| Italian Albums (FIMI) | 10 |
| New Zealand Albums (RMNZ) | 5 |
| Norwegian Albums (VG-lista) | 13 |
| Scottish Albums (Official Charts) | 2 |
| Swedish Albums (Sverigetopplistan) | 2 |
| Swiss Albums (Schweizer Hitparade) | 4 |
| UK Albums (Official Charts) | 1 |
| UK Rock & Metal Albums (Official Charts) | 1 |
| US Billboard 200 | 2 |

=== Year-end charts ===
Year-end chart performance for Silver Side Up
| Chart (2001) | Position |
|---|---|
| Canadian Albums (Nielsen SoundScan) | 6 |
| US Billboard 200 | 80 |

| Chart (2002) | Position |
|---|---|
| Australian Albums (ARIA) | 56 |
| Austrian Albums (Ö3 Austria) | 7 |
| Belgian Albums (Ultratop Flanders) | 30 |
| Belgian Albums (Ultratop Wallonia) | 42 |
| Canadian Albums (Nielsen SoundScan) | 8 |
| Canadian Alternative Albums (Nielsen SoundScan) | 3 |
| Canadian Metal Albums (Nielsen SoundScan) | 1 |
| Danish Albums (Hitlisten) | 46 |
| Dutch Albums (Album Top 100) | 61 |
| Europe (European Top 100 Albums) | 6 |
| French Albums (SNEP) | 64 |
| German Albums (Offizielle Top 100) | 13 |
| New Zealand Albums (RMNZ) | 29 |
| Swedish Albums (Sverigetopplistan) | 35 |
| Swiss Albums (Schweizer Hitparade) | 12 |
| UK Albums (OCC) | 12 |
| US Billboard 200 | 7 |

| Chart (2003) | Position |
|---|---|
| UK Albums (OCC) | 149 |

=== Decade-end charts ===
| Chart (2000–2009) | Position |
|---|---|
| US Billboard 200 | 47 |

== Certifications and sales ==
| Region | Certification | Certified units/sales |
|---|---|---|
| Australia (ARIA) | 2× Platinum | 140,000^{^} |
| Austria (IFPI Austria) | Platinum | 40,000^{*} |
| Belgium (BRMA) | Gold | 25,000^{*} |
| Canada (Music Canada) | 8× Platinum | 800,000^{^} |
| Denmark (IFPI Danmark) | 2× Platinum | 40,000^{‡} |
| France (SNEP) | Gold | 100,000^{*} |
| Germany (BVMI) | Platinum | 300,000^{^} |
| Netherlands (NVPI) | Platinum | 80,000^{^} |
| New Zealand (RMNZ) | Platinum | 15,000^{‡} |
| Sweden (GLF) | Gold | 40,000^{^} |
| Switzerland (IFPI Switzerland) | Platinum | 40,000^{^} |
| United Kingdom (BPI) | 3× Platinum | 1,117,454 |
| United States (RIAA) | 6× Platinum | 6,000,000^{^} |
Summaries
| Europe (IFPI) | 2× Platinum | 2,000,000^{*} |
^{*} Sales figures based on certification alone.^{^} Shipments figures based on certification alone.^{‡} Sales+streaming figures based on certification alone.
