= Too Bad (Nickelback song) =

2001 single by Nickelback

Single by Nickelback

from the album Silver Side Up
- B-side: "Yanking Out My Heart"; "Learn the Hard Way"
- Released: November 27, 2001
- Studio: Greenhouse (Burnaby, British Columbia)
- Genre: Post-grunge; hard rock
- Length: 3:56
- Label: Roadrunner
- Songwriters: Chad Kroeger; Mike Kroeger; Ryan Peake; Ryan Vikedal
- Producers: Rick Parashar; Nickelback

Nickelback singles chronology
| "How You Remind Me" (2001) | "Too Bad" (2001) | "Never Again" (2002) |

Music video
- "Too Bad" on YouTube

"Too Bad" is a song by Canadian rock band Nickelback, released on November 27, 2001, as the second single from their third studio album, Silver Side Up (2001). The song reached number 42 on the US Billboard Hot 100 chart, topped the Billboard Mainstream Rock Tracks chart, and peaked within the top 20 in Ireland, the Netherlands, and the United Kingdom.

== Lyrical content ==
The lyrics were written by the band's singer and guitarist Chad Kroeger and deals with the issues he felt growing up without his and his brother Mike Kroeger's father, who abandoned them when Chad was two years old.

== Music video ==
A music video was made for the song showing the band playing in the "Woodley Sawmill". A picture of the father and his son standing next to a truck is shown. After receiving a foreclosure notice, the father leaves his family and his son seems to be the most impacted. After years pass, he and his mother get into a fight ending with him leaving. He speeds down a dirt road where several flashbacks appear and distracted he crashes into a wooden post, breaking his leg. The music stops for a moment when his father receives a phone call telling him about the accident, then starts again. He is brought back to his house, where he sees his father sitting at the table, and the two walk out to the father's truck. The song ends with the picture shown at the beginning of the video shown again.

== Track listings ==
UK CD single

1. "Too Bad" (Diggla mix)
2. "Never Again" (live)
3. "Leader of Men" (live)
4. "Too Bad" (live video)

UK cassette single

1. "Too Bad" (Diggla mix) – 3:29
2. "How You Remind Me" (live) – 5:48

European CD single 1

1. "Too Bad" (Diggla mix) – 3:29
2. "Woke Up This Morning" (live) – 3:49
3. "How You Remind Me" (live) – 5:48
4. "Too Bad" (video)

European CD single 2

1. "Too Bad" (Diggla mix) – 3:29
2. "Yanking Out My..." – 3:34
3. "Too Bad" (video)

European maxi-CD single

1. "Too Bad" (Diggla mix) – 3:29
2. "Yanking Out My..." – 3:34
3. "Learn the Hard Way" – 2:54
4. "Too Bad" (video)

Australian maxi-CD single

1. "Too Bad" – 3:51
2. "How You Remind Me" (Cold Live at the Chapel) – 4:15
3. "Learn the Hard Way" – 2:54

== Personnel ==
Personnel are lifted from the UK CD single liner notes.

- Chad Kroeger – lead vocals, guitars
- Ryan Peake – guitars, vocals
- Mike Kroeger – bass
- Ryan Vikedal – drums

== Charts ==
=== Weekly charts ===
Weekly chart performance for "Too Bad"
| Chart (2002) | Peak position |
|---|---|
| Australia (ARIA) | 56 |
| Austria (Ö3 Austria Top 40) | 26 |
| Belgium (Ultratop 50 Flanders) | 23 |
| Belgium (Ultratop 50 Wallonia) | 39 |
| Canada Radio (Nielsen BDS) | 32 |
| Canada CHR (Nielsen BDS) | 16 |
| Europe (Eurochart Hot 100) | 36 |
| Germany (GfK) | 41 |
| Ireland (IRMA) | 6 |
| Italy (FIMI) | 36 |
| Netherlands (Dutch Top 40) | 16 |
| Netherlands (Single Top 100) | 41 |
| Romania (Romanian Top 100) | 100 |
| Scottish Singles Sales (Official Charts) | 5 |
| Switzerland (Schweizer Hitparade) | 48 |
| UK Singles (Official Charts) | 9 |
| UK Rock & Metal (Official Charts) | 1 |
| US Billboard Hot 100 | 42 |
| US Adult Pop Airplay (Billboard) | 31 |
| US Alternative Airplay (Billboard) | 6 |
| US Mainstream Rock Airplay (Billboard) | 1 |
| US Pop Airplay (Billboard) | 23 |

=== Year-end charts ===
Year-end chart performance for "Too Bad"
| Chart (2002) | Position |
|---|---|
| Canada Radio (Nielsen BDS) | 17 |
| Ireland (IRMA) | 88 |
| UK Singles (OCC) | 192 |
| US Adult Top 40 (Billboard) | 71 |
| US Mainstream Rock Tracks (Billboard) | 5 |
| US Mainstream Top 40 (Billboard) | 98 |
| US Modern Rock Tracks (Billboard) | 14 |

== Certifications ==
Certifications and sales for "Too Bad"
| Region | Certification | Certified units/sales |
|---|---|---|
| New Zealand (RMNZ) | Gold | 15,000^{‡} |
| United Kingdom (BPI) | Silver | 200,000^{‡} |
| United States (RIAA) | Gold | 500,000^{‡} |
^{‡} Sales+streaming figures based on certification alone.

== Release history ==
Release dates and formats for "Too Bad"
| Region | Date | Format(s) | Label(s) | Ref. |
|---|---|---|---|---|
| United States | November 27, 2001 | Mainstream rock; active rock radio | Roadrunner | |
| Australia | March 4, 2002 | Maxi-CD | Roadrunner | |
| United States | March 25, 2002 | Contemporary hit radio | Roadrunner | |
| United Kingdom | August 26, 2002 | CD; cassette | Roadrunner | |
| Japan | August 28, 2002 | CD | Roadrunner | |
