= Greenhouse Studios =

Canadian music recording studio

Greenhouse Studios is a Canadian music recording studio founded by Bruce Levens in 1987 where over 1000 albums have been recorded in the last 25 years. Incorporated as Lions Gate Studios, it subsequently changed its name to Vancouver Studios before adopting its present name.

The studio started as a single room in half of an industrial building. As the business grew, the original MCI console was replaced by an SSL G Series, which brought in even bigger projects. A smaller studio was added for overdubs and budget-conscious artists. When the building next door became available, it was incorporated into the operation, and Studio 1 became a standalone studio. Two edit suites were added for post-production work. A penthouse studio and warehouse studio were added in the 1990s.

When the studio moved to downtown Vancouver in the early 2000s, a large tracking room, overdub studio and mix room were added.

== Music artists ==
The careers of international stars k.d. lang, Queensrÿche and Sarah McLachlan were built on songs recorded at Greenhouse Studios. It has recorded for many of Canada's other top bands, including 54-40, Default, Wide Mouth Mason, Matthew Good Band, Mossy Ledge, Age of Electric, Odds, Spirit of the West, Barney Bentall, Colin James and Pluto.

Nickelback recorded three albums at Greenhouse: The State, Silver Side Up, and The Long Road. The State was recorded and produced by Dale Penner with Dave Ashton assisting. Silver Side Up was produced by Rick Parashar. Silver Side Up album would yield "How You Remind Me", the number-one played radio song of the decade 2000–2009, according to Nielsen SoundScan. Nickelback was subsequently named Music Group of the Decade by Billboard magazine. Silver Side Up was also engineered by Joey Moi, who subsequently co-produced and -engineered all of Nickelback's albums until the end of the decade.

An unknown torch singer from Alberta, k.d. lang, started recording at Greenhouse in the late 1980s. She recorded five projects with Greenhouse, including the Ingénue album, which gave her international status and won a Grammy Award for engineering for Marc Raemer—the only album recorded in Western Canada to achieve this distinction. k.d. lang was inducted into the Canadian Music Hall of Fame at the 2013 Juno Awards. She has collaborated on projects at Greenhouse Studios with violinist and songwriter Ben Mink.

Greenhouse Studios' first client was Steven Drake, singer and guitar player of the band the Odds. The Odds recorded three of their four albums there (the fourth could not be accommodated, due to a Bob Rock production). Steven Drake added producing and mixing to his musical skills, and subsequently worked on albums by 54-40, The Tragically Hip, Staggered Crossing and Tegan and Sara at the studio. He was also the last client to record at the original facility; his final mix was completed in the Studio B control room while the live room was being demolished.

Greenhouse Studios has hosted numerous international clients. Roger Daltrey of The Who recorded vocal tracks there, as did Salt-N-Pepa. Cher recorded in Vancouver at the Studio, and Akon worked on new tracks following his show at GM Place.

Queensrÿche recorded and mixed the Empire album at the studio. Peter Collins produced it, and James Barton engineered, assisted by the studio's Marc Raemar. The album sold 3 million copies in the U.S. and received Triple Platinum certification. It produced the power ballad "Silent Lucidity", which reached No. 1 on the mainstream rock tracks and No. 9 on the Billboard Hot 100.

Skid Row recorded the album Subhuman Race, the followup to Slave to the Grind. The production team of Bob Rock producing and Randy Staub engineering would team up to make this album. Brian Dobbs and Darren Grahn were the 2nd engineers on this record. Lead singer Sebastian Bach would continue his tradition of hi-jinx during an interview with Vancouverite Nardwuar the Human Serviette.

Matthew Good Band and the subsequent Matthew Good would several albums at Greenhouse. Last of the Ghetto Astronauts, Underdogs, and Beautiful Midnight were all recorded at the facilities. Matthew Good would bring in Warne Livesey as a music producer. Warne Livesey, a music producer, engineer, and mixer from England and the producer of Diesel and Dust by Midnight Oil, has recorded multiple music projects at Greenhouse Studios since.

Bruce Levens of Greenhouse Studios would found London Smith Discs in 1991. The London Smith label started out recording the band Freewater at Greenhouse. The next artist up would be Stigmata comprised on Kevin Lucks and Mark Findler. North Vancouver band Mushroom Trail would record its debut album before unceremoniously disappearing from the music business. The final project for London Smith was the sophomore release of Lowest of the Low produced by Texan Don Was. The first release of Lowest of the Low, Shakespeare My Butt..., is considered one of the great Canadian albums.

k-os would record and mix part of his 2012 release Black on Blonde.

The Mounties would record their first track, "Headphones", in 2013.

== Facility ==
The main consoles have been SSL G & E series; the studio operated four SSL rooms for a couple of years. Greenhouse Studios owned seven different SSL consoles, including an early B series as well as three E series and three G series.

The studio moved from two-inch analog tape to Pro Tools recording in 2001. RADAR has also been used since the mid-1990s.

In 2012, a Neve VR Legend 48 channel console was purchased. The Neve replaced the last SSL G series console which was sold to Charles Allin, Owner of Montana Recording Studio.

The initial studio was designed by Westlake Audio. Subsequent studios were designed by the Levens brothers with input and tweaking from several music producer–engineers and studio designers. Studio B is the only music studio in Western Canada to record an album, k.d. lang's Ingenue, that won a Grammy Award for engineering.

== People ==
Engineer Marc Raemer built his career which included a Grammy Award for engineering the k.d. lang album Ingenue. Jason Mauza continued his recording career in LA. Dave Ashton recorded many projects including the breakthrough Nickelback album; Dave moved to LA and continued to build his career. The studio started working with Joey Moi in the late 1990s. Moi worked with Chad Kroeger and has been involved in all the Nickelback recordings. He and Kroeger were instrumental in the development of Theory of a Deadman, Default and Thornley, among other projects.

Corey Dixon started as a junior audio technician at Greenhouse. Dixon owns and operates Big Valley Audio and continues to work with Greenhouse Studios. Chris Farrelly worked at Greenhouse as a studio technician under Corey Dixion from 2001 to 2005. Chris would later move from sound engineering to underwater acoustics and CEO of Trident Hydrographic Services.

Client services and front end has been home to several talented people. Anne-Marie Damjanovic would go on to run Reely Unique, a specialty audio rental service for many years. Mimi Northcott founded and operates Canadian Recording Services, a music referral service and producer management company. Rhian Gittins moved to LA and worked at the A&M recording studios; she would marry Dave Navarro. Tanya Coughlin joined EMI publishing Canada. Lindsay Reinhelt became a concert promoter and also has a career as a performing artist.

A recording studio of the same name existed in Old Street, London, and was home to producers Pat Collier and Jessica Corcoran, who were responsible for hit albums for The Wonder Stuff, Ned's Atomic Dustbin, and Mega City Four, among others.
