= The Long Road =

Studio album by Nickelback
- Released: September 23, 2003
- Recorded: December 2002–April 2003
- Studios: Greenhouse Studios (Burnaby, British Columbia); Mountain View Studios (Abbotsford, British Columbia)
- Genres: Post-grunge; hard rock; alternative metal
- Length: 40:34; 60:08 (bonus tracks)
- Label: Roadrunner
- Producers: Nickelback; Joey Moi

Nickelback chronology
Silver Side Up (2001)	The Long Road (2003)	All the Right Reasons (2005)

Singles from The Long Road
- 1. "Someday" Released: July 28, 2003; 2. "Figured You Out" Released: November 3, 2003; 3. "Feelin' Way Too Damn Good" Released: March 15, 2004; 4. "Because of You" Released: September 6, 2004

The Long Road is the fourth studio album by Canadian rock band Nickelback, released on September 23, 2003. Recorded at the famed Greenhouse Studios in Vancouver, it is the band's final album with Ryan Vikedal as drummer, and features a notable change in style towards more aggressive guitar riffs and the inclusion of double bass drumming. The album is the first collaboration with producer Joey Moi; who engineered their previous album, Silver Side Up, and produced the band's next three albums.

== Composition ==
Most of the album's songs were an experiment from the band into writing heavier downtuned riffs in either B or C tuning. On tracks such as "Flat on the Floor", "Because of You", and "Throw Yourself Away"; Vikedal implemented the use of double bass drumming. Despite this; the album features several prominent acoustic segments on songs such as "Someday", "Believe it or Not", and "Should've Listened". Kroeger's lyrics often revolved around topics ranging from breakups, self-harm, sex, and personal motivation. Kroeger wrote the lyrics to "Throw Yourself Away" about Melissa Drexler's infamous 1997 infanticide at her high school prom.

During the band's appearance at Bizarre Festival in Weeze, Germany, on August 16, 2002; "Figured You Out" made its first live appearance.

"Someday" later made an appearance as a part of Nickelback's appearance on MTV Unplugged in London on September 3, 2003.

== Commercial performance ==
The album debuted at No. 6 on the Billboard 200 in the United States and sold 200,000 copies in its first week of release. The album was quickly certified platinum by the RIAA on October 24, 2003; eventually being certified double-platinum on March 6, 2004. The album was later certified 3× Platinum in the United States on March 10, 2005; having sold 3,591,000 copies as of April 2011. It has sold over five million copies worldwide and was the sixth best-selling album of 2003, having also sold over two million copies internationally. It was later ranked No. 157 on Billboard's 200 Albums of the Decade.

== Critical reception ==
Professional ratings
Aggregate scores
Source	Rating
Metacritic	62/100
Review scores
Source	Rating
AllMusic	2/5 stars
E! Online	B−
The Encyclopedia of Popular Music	3/5 stars
Entertainment Weekly	B+
The Guardian	1/5 stars
Now	1/5 stars
Q	3/5 stars
Rolling Stone	3/5 stars
The Rolling Stone Album Guide	4/5 stars

The album received polarizing reviews from critics. Journalists often praised the heavier musical direction and aggressive guitar riffs, but criticized the album's misogynistic lyrics. The album was nominated for Rock Album of the Year at the 2004 Grammy Awards.

Tom Sinclair of Entertainment Weekly praised the album for its musical compositions, lauding the angrier direction and Vikedal's strong drumming on numerous tracks, claiming "The band hammers each song home with a single-minded fervor, cannily melding metal, grunge, and melody. As a singer, Kroeger possesses that rarest of latter-day rock-star commodities: an instantly identifiable voice imbued with passion and edge".

Stephen Thomas Erlewine of AllMusic gave the album a modest review, criticizing Kroeger's songwriting but also praising the production of the album in addition to the band's darker change in musical direction, claiming "Nickelback courts it through their audience-pleasing grunge pastiche, which treats the style as just another variation of hard rock".

== Tour ==
The band embarked on The Long Road Tour in support of the album with Trapt and Three Days Grace hired as opening acts. Theory of a Deadman were later hired as an opening act in November 2003 replacing Trapt. The tour included 45 North American dates, 25 European dates, three Japanese dates, and five Australian dates, the second longest tour to date from the band. Prior to the second European leg, opening acts Theory of a Deadman and Three Days Grace were replaced by 3 Doors Down and Puddle of Mudd. Following the tour, on January 2, 2005, Nickelback unexpectedly fired Vikedal after a minor royalty disagreement, replacing him with 3 Doors Down drummer Daniel Adair. Kroeger later sued Vikedal to prevent him receiving any further royalties from the band's music, though the matter was later settled out of court for an undisclosed amount.

== Personnel ==
Credits adapted from album's liner notes.

Nickelback

- Chad Kroeger – lead vocals, guitar
- Ryan Peake – guitar, backing vocals
- Mike Kroeger – bass
- Ryan Vikedal – drums

Additional musicians

- Brian Larson, Cameron Wilson, Henry Lee, Zoltan Rozsnyai – strings (track 3)
- Corrine Youchezin – female voice (track 5)

Production

- Joey Moi – producer, engineer, digital editing
- Nickelback – producer
- Alex "Laquaysh" Aligizakis – assistant engineer
- Ryan Andersen – digital editing
- Randy Staub – mixing
- Zach Blackstone – mixing assistant
- George Marino – mastering

== Track listing ==
Standard edition

All lyrics are written by Chad Kroeger except where noted; all music is composed by Nickelback except where noted.

No.	Title	Length
1.	"Flat on the Floor"	2:02
2.	"Do This Anymore"	4:03
3.	"Someday" (lyrics by C. Kroeger, Mike Kroeger and Ryan Peake)	3:27
4.	"Believe It or Not"	4:07
5.	"Feelin' Way Too Damn Good"	4:16
6.	"Because of You"	3:30
7.	"Figured You Out"	3:48
8.	"Should've Listened"	3:42
9.	"Throw Yourself Away"	3:55
10.	"Another Hole in the Head"	3:35
11.	"See You at the Show"	4:04
Total length:		40:34

Japan bonus tracks
No.	Title	Length
12.	"Someday" (acoustic)	3:20
13.	"Slow Motion"	3:32

Special edition
No.	Title	Length
12.	"Saturday Night's Alright for Fighting" (Elton John cover; lyrics by Bernie Taupin; music by Elton John)	3:44
13.	"Yanking Out My Heart"	3:36
14.	"Learn the Hard Way"	2:55

Other tracks and B-sides
No.	Title	Length
12.	"Love Will Keep Us Together"	2:17
13.	"Too Bad" (MTV Unplugged)
14.	"Where Do I Hide" (MTV Unplugged)
15.	"Leader of Men" (MTV Unplugged)

== Charts ==
=== Weekly charts ===
Chart (2003)	Peak position
Australian Albums (ARIA)	4
Austrian Albums (Ö3 Austria)	4
Belgian Albums (Ultratop Flanders)	29
Canadian Albums (Billboard)	1
Danish Albums (Hitlisten)	16
Dutch Albums (Album Top 100)	11
French Albums (SNEP)	39
German Albums (Offizielle Top 100)	4
Irish Albums (IRMA)	9
Italian Albums (FIMI)	11
New Zealand Albums (RMNZ)	3
Norwegian Albums (VG-lista)	38
Portuguese Albums (AFP)	29
Swedish Albums (Sverigetopplistan)	27
Swiss Albums (Schweizer Hitparade)	4
UK Albums (Official Charts)	5
US Billboard 200	6

=== Year-end charts ===
Chart (2003)	Position
Australian Albums (ARIA)	58
Austrian Albums (Ö3 Austria)	51
German Albums (Offizielle Top 100)	57
Swiss Albums (Schweizer Hitparade)	28
UK Albums (OCC)	92
US Billboard 200	100

Chart (2004)	Position
Australian Albums (ARIA)	22
US Billboard 200	26

=== Decade-end charts ===
Chart (2000–2009)	Position
US Billboard 200	157

== Certifications ==
Region	Certification	Certified units/sales
Australia (ARIA)	3× Platinum	210,000^{^}
Austria (IFPI Austria)	Gold	15,000^{*}
Canada (Music Canada)	5× Platinum	500,000^{^}
Germany (BVMI)	Gold	100,000^{^}
New Zealand (RMNZ)	Gold	7,500^{^}
Switzerland (IFPI Switzerland)	Gold	20,000^{^}
United Kingdom (BPI)	Platinum	300,000^{^}
United States (RIAA)	3× Platinum	3,000,000^{^}
^{*} Sales figures based on certification alone.^{^} Shipments figures based on certification alone.
