= How You Remind Me =

2001 single by Nickelback

Single by Nickelback

from the album Silver Side Up
- B-side: "Little Friend"
- Released: July 17, 2001
- Studio: Greenhouse (Burnaby, British Columbia)
- Genre: Post-grunge; hard rock; alternative rock
- Length: 3:43
- Label: Roadrunner
- Composer: Nickelback
- Lyricist: Chad Kroeger
- Producers: Rick Parashar; Nickelback

Nickelback singles chronology
"Worthy to Say" (2000)	"How You Remind Me" (2001)	"Too Bad" (2001)

Music video
- "How You Remind Me" on YouTube

"How You Remind Me"
Nickelback's "How You Remind Me" from Silver Side Up

"How You Remind Me" is a song by the Canadian rock band Nickelback, released on July 17, 2001, as the lead single from their third studio album, Silver Side Up (2001). Considered Nickelback's signature song, "How You Remind Me" reached number one on the US Billboard Hot 100. By 2010, it had been played more than 1.2 million times on US radio, making it the most-played song of the decade.

The song was ranked fourth on the Billboard Hot 100 Songs of the Decade and 75th on the UK decade-end chart. It was nominated for the Kerrang! Award for Best Single. "How You Remind Me" was also rated the number-one rock song and number-four alternative song of the decade of the 2000s by Billboard. In 2024, Consequence included the song in their list of "50 Kick-Butt Post-Grunge Songs We Can Get Behind".

== Background ==
Lead singer Chad Kroeger had the first four lines of "How You Remind Me", a post-grunge, hard rock and alternative rock song, written in his black book of notes. One day he got into an argument with his then-girlfriend in their Vancouver apartment. He went to the basement, turned on his recording microphone, and started improvising and singing the song loudly, hoping she would get the message how upset he was. Instead, she told him it sounded great. "Somewhere between 45 minutes and an hour, I had the whole thing fleshed out: lyrics, melody, chords, the whole nine yards," he said.

He added, "It wasn't supposed to be a vengeful anthem; it was supposed to be what it was. I think it always felt like that in the moment, because we just had an argument, and I felt like striking back. But I find it to be a sarcastic look at relationships. [Like the line] 'Are we having fun yet?' That's full sarcasm."

Kroeger brought a skeleton version of the song to his band as a last-minute addition a week before they were to start recording Silver Side Up, and they worked on the song together.

== Chart performances and awards ==
"How You Remind Me" peaked at number one on the US Billboard Hot 100, becoming Nickelback's only American chart-topper. Due to its high sales and massive airplay, "How You Remind Me" was ranked as the top single of 2002 by Billboard magazine. The single was certified nine-times platinum by the Recording Industry Association of America (RIAA) in 2026, for sales and streams of over 9,000,000 units. The song went on to rack up four Billboard Music Awards and four Juno Awards. "How You Remind Me" was the number one most played song of 2002 in the United States, across all formats, according to Billboard Monitor. In 2003, the song was nominated for Grammy Award for Record of the Year at the 45th Annual Grammy Awards. "How You Remind Me" was the number one song on the Billboard's 2002 Year-End Hot 100 Singles Chart, and VH1 ranked the song as the 16th-greatest power ballad.

The song was listed at number 36 on Billboard's All Time Top 100. In 2021, for the 40th anniversary of the Mainstream Rock chart, Billboard ranked "How You Remind Me" as the fourth-biggest hit in the chart's history; the same magazine later ranked the song as the 20th-biggest hit in the history of Alternative Airplay in 2023, for that chart's 35th anniversary. The song also hit number one on the Kerrang! feature, 21st Century's Official 100 Rock Best Sellers. The song was the 75th best-selling single of the 2000s in the United Kingdom. In Germany, it's not just the band's best-charting single by reaching number three on the German Singles Chart, it's also Nickelback's longest-staying single on that chart, namely a total of 30 weeks. In 2011, Fuse TV named it the number one song of the decade. It was listed as number nine at the Billboard Hot 100 top 100 Rock Songs of the last 50 years. Loudwire listed the song as number 30 on its list "Top 21st Century Hard Rock Songs".

== Music video ==
The music video for "How You Remind Me" was directed by Greg and Colin Strause and features Nickelback playing a small venue with focus on a female audience member. Kroeger admitted to disliking the idea of a small venue performance at first, opting for a bigger scale arena concert; however, he found the outcome of the video satisfying.

In the video, in scenes that alternate with the concert setting, Kroeger plays a man who is haunted by the memory of his ex-girlfriend (played by model Annie Henley). He constantly imagines or perceives her presence, making the world around him seem vibrant; when he realizes she is not there, the lighting changes to a blue-gray filter. At the end, she attends the concert, where Kroeger's character is also in the crowd. She approaches him but he rejects her; he is depicted physically pushing her away in the memory setting, as well as aggressively singing the song's lyrics at her in the concert setting. She is left alone in the dully lit setting.

Another version of the video exists, and has been played on some UK and Australian music channels. The video simply features the footage of the band playing from the main video, added to footage of the band's live performances and tour movies.

== Track listings ==
US CD single

1. "How You Remind Me"
2. "Leader of Men" (acoustic)

UK CD single

1. "How You Remind Me" – 3:43
2. "How You Remind Me" (acoustic) – 3:28
3. "Learn the Hard Way" – 2:54
4. "How You Remind Me" (video)

UK cassette single

1. "How You Remind Me" – 3:43
2. "How You Remind Me" (acoustic) – 3:28

European CD single

1. "How You Remind Me" (album version) – 3:43
2. "How You Remind Me" (Gold mix) – 3:43

European maxi-CD and Japanese CD single

1. "How You Remind Me" (Gold mix) – 3:43
2. "How You Remind Me" (album version) – 3:43
3. "How You Remind Me" (acoustic version) – 3:28
4. "How You Remind Me" (video)

Australian CD single

1. "How You Remind Me"
2. "How You Remind Me" (acoustic)
3. "Little Friend"

== Credits and personnel ==
Credits are taken from the Silver Side Up booklet.

Studios

- Recorded at Greenhouse Studios (Burnaby, British Columbia)
- Mixed at Armoury Studios (Vancouver, British Columbia)
- Mastered at Sterling Sound (New York City)

Personnel

- Nickelback – music, production
  - Chad Kroeger – lyrics, lead vocals, guitars
  - Ryan Peake – guitars, vocals
  - Mike Kroeger – bass
  - Ryan "Nik" Vikedal – drums
- Rick Parashar – production
- Joey Moi – engineering, digital editing
- Pat "Sajak" Sharman – assistant engineering
- Alex Aligizakis – assistant engineering, Pro Tools
- Geoff Ott – assistant engineering
- Kevin "Chief" Zaruk – production cooradination
- Randy Staub – mixing
- George Marino – mastering

== Charts ==
=== Weekly charts ===
2001–2006 weekly chart performance for "How You Remind Me"
Chart (2001–2006)	Peak position
Australia (ARIA)	2
Austria (Ö3 Austria Top 40)	1
Belgium (Ultratop 50 Flanders)	2
Belgium (Ultratop 50 Wallonia)	4
Canada Radio (Nielsen BDS)	1
Canada CHR (Nielsen BDS)	3
Czech Republic (Radio Top 100)	96
Denmark (Tracklisten)	1
Europe (Eurochart Hot 100)	2
European Radio Top 50 (Music & Media)	9
Finland (Suomen virallinen lista)	18
France (SNEP)	11
Germany (GfK)	3
Hungary Airplay (Music & Media)	14
Ireland (IRMA)	1
Italy (FIMI)	14
Netherlands (Dutch Top 40)	7
Netherlands (Single Top 100)	17
Netherlands Airplay (Music & Media)	8
New Zealand (Recorded Music NZ)	4
Norway (VG-lista)	4
Romania (Romanian Top 100)	13
Russia Airplay (Music & Media)	13
Scottish Singles Sales (Official Charts)	4
Sweden (Sverigetopplistan)	4
Switzerland (Schweizer Hitparade)	3
UK Singles (Official Charts)	4
UK Airplay (Music Week)	3
UK Rock & Metal (Official Charts)	1
US Billboard Hot 100	1
US Adult Alternative Airplay (Billboard)	11
US Adult Pop Airplay (Billboard)	2
US Alternative Airplay (Billboard)	1
US Mainstream Rock Airplay (Billboard)	1
US Pop Airplay (Billboard)	1

2016 weekly chart performance for "How You Remind Me"
Chart (2016)	Peak position
Poland Airplay (ZPAV)	87

2026 weekly chart performance for "How You Remind Me"
Chart (2026)	Peak position
Lithuania (AGATA)	100
Global 200 (Billboard)	181
Poland Airplay (OLiS)	78

=== Year-end charts ===
2001 year-end chart performance for "How You Remind Me"
Chart (2001)	Position
Australia (ARIA)	18
Brazil (Crowley)	86
Canada Radio (Nielsen BDS)	12
Netherlands (Dutch Top 40)	87
US Adult Top 40 (Billboard)	98
US Mainstream Rock Tracks (Billboard)	9
US Modern Rock Tracks (Billboard)	13

2002 year-end chart performance for "How You Remind Me"
Chart (2002)	Position
Australia (ARIA)	93
Austria (Ö3 Austria Top 40)	6
Belgium (Ultratop 50 Flanders)	17
Belgium (Ultratop 50 Wallonia)	56
Brazil (Crowley)	17
Canada Radio (Nielsen BDS)	18
Europe (Eurochart Hot 100)	4
France (SNEP)	98
Germany (Media Control)	13
Ireland (IRMA)	8
Netherlands (Dutch Top 40)	16
Netherlands (Single Top 100)	69
New Zealand (RIANZ)	31
Sweden (Hitlistan)	9
Switzerland (Schweizer Hitparade)	13
UK Singles (OCC)	12
UK Airplay (Music Week)	4
US Billboard Hot 100	1
US Adult Top 40 (Billboard)	2
US Mainstream Rock Tracks (Billboard)	6
US Mainstream Top 40 (Billboard)	1
US Modern Rock Tracks (Billboard)	16

=== Decade-end charts ===
Decade-end chart performance for "How You Remind Me"
Chart (2000–2009)	Position
Australia (ARIA)	68
US Billboard Hot 100	4
US Hot Alternative Songs (Billboard)	4
US Hot Rock Songs (Billboard)	1
US Mainstream Top 40 (Billboard)	3

=== All-time charts ===
All-time chart performance for "How You Remind Me"
Chart	Position
US Billboard Hot 100	45

== Certifications ==
Certifications and sales for "How You Remind Me"
Region	Certification	Certified units/sales
Australia (ARIA)	3× Platinum	210,000^{^}
Austria (IFPI Austria)	Gold	20,000^{*}
Belgium (BRMA)	Gold	25,000^{*}
Denmark (IFPI Danmark)	2× Platinum	180,000^{‡}
France (SNEP)	Gold	250,000^{*}
Germany (BVMI)	2× Platinum	1,200,000^{‡}
Italy (FIMI)	Platinum	50,000^{‡}
New Zealand (RMNZ)	6× Platinum	180,000^{‡}
Spain (Promusicae)	Gold	30,000^{‡}
Sweden (GLF)	Platinum	30,000^{^}
Switzerland (IFPI Switzerland)	Gold	20,000^{^}
United Kingdom (BPI)	4× Platinum	2,400,000^{‡}
United States (RIAA)	9× Platinum	9,000,000^{‡}
^{*} Sales figures based on certification alone.^{^} Shipments figures based on certification alone.^{‡} Sales+streaming figures based on certification alone.

== Release history ==
Release dates and formats for "How You Remind Me"
Region	Date	Format(s)	Label(s)	Ref(s).
United States	July 17, 2001	Mainstream rock; active rock; alternative radio	Roadrunner	
Australia	September 10, 2001	CD	Roadrunner	
United States	October 9, 2001	Contemporary hit radio	Roadrunner	
United Kingdom	February 25, 2002	CD	Roadrunner	
Japan	March 21, 2002	CD	Roadrunner	

== Avril Lavigne version ==
"How You Remind Me"
- Two-track CD edition cover

Promotional single by Avril Lavigne

from the album One Piece Film: Z and Avril Lavigne
- A-side: "Bad Reputation"
- Released: December 12, 2012
- Recorded: 2012
- Studio: Conway (Los Angeles)
- Length: 4:05
- Label: Sony Japan; Epic
- Songwriter: Chad Kroeger
- Producer: Chad Kroeger

Audio
- "How You Remind Me" on YouTube

Canadian singer-songwriter Avril Lavigne recorded a version of "How You Remind Me" for the anime film One Piece Film: Z. It was reported on October 17, 2012, that Lavigne would be contributing two cover songs to the film: the latter track and a cover of Joan Jett's "Bad Reputation". Lavigne later confirmed the new recording on November 5, 2012. It was released on December 12, 2012, as a digital download from the One Piece Film: Z Original Soundtrack. The 2-track promotional CD single was released on the next day, exclusive to Japan.

The song was re-released on December 19, 2013, by iTunes Stores as a digital download promotional single for her self-titled fifth album. Later, it was included in the Japan, Taiwan and China tour edition of the album as one of the bonus tracks.

=== Background ===
Lavigne was in the studio with Kroeger working on her fifth studio album when she was asked to contribute a song to the film, but didn't have time to write another song during the studio sessions they had left. Kroeger later explained that it was Lavigne's idea to cover the song, stating:

"Avril jokingly suggested to cover a Nickelback song, but then we both figured it'd actually be a good idea to do "How You Remind Me". We recorded a version more similar to the original, but we both were not happy with it, thinking it needs its own spin. Avril then rearranged the song and we all liked it".

An audio-only video was put on Lavigne's official Vevo on January 8, 2013.

=== Track listings ===
CD single

1. "How You Remind Me" – 4:05
2. "Bad Reputation" – 2:42

Digital download

1. "How You Remind Me" – 4:05

=== Release history ===
Release dates and formats for "How You Remind Me"
Region	Date	Format	Label	Ref.
Japan	December 12, 2012	CD	Sony Japan	
United States	December 19, 2013	Digital download	Epic	
Canada	December 19, 2013	Digital download	Epic	

== Other versions ==
Greek singer Alkistis Protopsalti released a cover of the song entitled "Όλα αυτά που φοβάμαι" ("All My Fears") in her 2004 album Να σε βλέπω να γελάς (To See You Laugh).

== In popular culture ==
The song played a large role in a Saturday Night Live skit on March 10, 2018, with Sterling K. Brown in which the lyrics are a dying old woman named Mrs. Gomez (Melissa Villaseñor)'s final words.
