= Never Gonna Be Alone =

Single by Nickelback

from the album Dark Horse
- Released: September 29, 2009
- Recorded: March–July 2008
- Studio: Mountain View Studios (Abbotsford, British Columbia)
- Genre: Alternative rock; country
- Length: 3:47
- Label: Roadrunner
- Songwriters: Robert John "Mutt" Lange; Chad Kroeger
- Producers: Robert John "Mutt" Lange; Joey Moi

Nickelback singles chronology
"Burn It to the Ground" (2009)	"Never Gonna Be Alone" (2009)	"Shakin' Hands" (2009)

Music video
- "Never Gonna Be Alone" on YouTube

"Never Gonna Be Alone" is a song recorded by Canadian rock group Nickelback for their sixth studio album, Dark Horse (2008). It was written by frontman Chad Kroeger with the record's producer, Robert John "Mutt" Lange. "Never Gonna Be Alone" was released to American radio on September 29, 2009 as the album's sixth overall single and third US pop single.

"Never Gonna Be Alone" became the group's tenth top 10 Adult Pop hit and was deemed by critics to be one of the album's best songs.

== Composition and lyrics ==
"Never Gonna Be Alone" is an alternative rock ballad, composed by Chad Kroeger and Mutt Lange. Kroeger's vocal style is influenced by country music. The song's lyrics speak of love or spirituality and find the narrator asking for a second chance. According to the sheet music published at Musicnotes.com by Alfred Publishing, the song is composed in the key of E major and is set in common time to a "moderately slow" tempo of approximately 69 beats per minute. Kroger has a one octave vocal range, from B_{4} to B_{5}.

== Background and release ==
The song made its North American debut on Montreal hot adult contemporary radio station CJFM-FM in December 2008 before its release as a single and later went into rotation on other Canadian stations. Roadrunner Records officially serviced the song to American contemporary hit radio on September 29, 2009. "Never Gonna Be Alone" serves as the third pop single in the US (after "Gotta Be Somebody" and "If Today Was Your Last Day") and fourth in Canada (including "I'd Come for You").

== Commercial performance ==
"Never Gonna Be Alone" debuted at number 68 on the Billboard Hot 100 chart dated December 6, 2008 following the release of Dark Horse due to strong digital sales. The song re-entered the Hot 100 at 96 on the chart dated November 21, 2009 after it was released as a single. It later reached a peak position of 58 on the chart dated January 9, 2010. The song reached the top 10 on the Adult Pop Songs chart in December 2009, becoming the group's tenth single to accomplish that feat. With the song's placement, Nickelback tied Goo Goo Dolls for the most top 10 singles on the chart in the 2000s decade. "Never Gonna Be Alone" peaked at number 5 on the chart dated January 30, 2010, making it the group's ninth top 5 hit ("Rockstar" peaked just outside the top 5 at number 6 in 2006).

In Canada, the song likewise entered the Canadian Hot 100 chart upon the release of Dark Horse, debuting at number 69 on the chart dated December 6, 2008. It re-entered the chart at the same position on the chart dated November 21, 2009 before reaching a peak position of 25 on the chart dated January 30, 2010.

== Music video ==
The music video was directed by Nigel Dick and premiered on November 10, 2009 on the social media accounts of Roadrunner Records. It began airing on VH1 and Fuse on November 23. The video tells the story of a young woman (played by Emily Bett Rickards) who has lost her father and depicts the love between the two.

=== Synopsis ===
The video opens with the young woman in a limousine being taken to her wedding. She is holding a fake blue flower with her bouquet. As she walks down the aisle, she looks back at her mother and father, who are smiling proudly. The video uses a series of flashbacks – the woman's high school graduation, her father seeing her off to prom, and her father teaching her how to ride a bike – to highlight the shared memories between the two. A final flashback shows the father's funeral, where it is revealed that he passed when she was just a little girl. At the funeral, the girl holds two fake flowers in her hand, one yellow and one blue. She tosses the yellow one into her father's grave.

The events in the flashbacks are shown again from a different perspective; each time the girl looks up at her father and sees him disappear in a shimmer of light. Back at the wedding, the girl is still looking back, seeing her father's ghost surrounded in light. The girl places the blue flower in her new husband's breast pocket, and the two wed. As they are leaving the church, the video cuts to her father once more, smiling proudly. He disappears for the final time, his daughter now fully grown up. Throughout, the video is intercut with scenes of the band singing in a room with a large, light-filled backdrop.

== Use in media ==
The song is featured on the soundtrack of the Brazilian soap opera, Caminho das Índias.

WWE used "Never Gonna Be Alone" in the montage highlighting John Cena's visits to Iraq that was shown during the 2009 edition of the Tribute to the Troops special.

== Track listing ==
International promo CD

1. "Never Gonna Be Alone"

Japanese promo "Best Of" EP

1. "Never Gonna Be Alone"
2. "Gotta Be Somebody"
3. "If Today Was Your Last Day"
4. "Photograph"
5. "Rockstar"
6. "Someday"
7. "Feelin' Way Too Damn Good"
8. "How You Remind Me"
9. "Too Bad"
10. "Breathe"
11. "Leader of Men"

== Charts ==
=== Weekly charts ===
Chart (2009–2010)	Peak position
Australia (ARIA)	64
Austria (Ö3 Austria Top 40)	73
Canada Hot 100 (Billboard)	25
Canada AC (Billboard)	19
Canada CHR/Top 40 (Billboard)	19
Canada Hot AC (Billboard)	3
Netherlands (Dutch Top 40)	37
Japan Hot 100 (Billboard)	97
US Billboard Hot 100	58
US Adult Contemporary (Billboard)	17
US Adult Pop Airplay (Billboard)	5
US Pop Airplay (Billboard)	28

=== Year end charts ===
Chart (2010)	Position
US Adult Contemporary (Billboard)	40
US Adult Pop Songs (Billboard)	28

== Certifications ==
Region	Certification	Certified units/sales
Canada (Music Canada)	Platinum	80,000^{‡}
^{‡} Sales+streaming figures based on certification alone.

== Release history ==
Release dates and formats for "Never Gonna Be Alone"
Region	Date	Format	Label(s)	Ref.
United States	September 29, 2009	Mainstream airplay	Roadrunner	
