= Nigel Dick =

British director, writer, and musician

Nigel Dick (born 1953) is an English music video director and filmmaker. Originally from Catterick, North Yorkshire, he is based in Los Angeles, California. He has directed music videos for artists such as Britney Spears, Toto, Band Aid, Guns N' Roses and Oasis.

== Education ==
Educated at Gresham's School in Holt and the University of Bath, Dick began to work for a degree in architecture before pursuing a career in the record business. He has studied mime and is also a graduate of Judith Weston's Acting for Directors class.

== Career ==
Before success in the music and film industries, Dick worked as an architectural draughtsman, a clerk, a busker, a cab driver, a construction worker, a farm labourer, a motorcycle messenger, a salesman, a waiter, and served a spell in the Sewage Division of the Anglian Water Authority.

He began his career in the record business working at Stiff Records, where he stayed for five years working as a Press Officer with Madness, Ian Dury, Lene Lovich, and the Plasmatics. In the early 1980s he moved to Phonogram Records, and while there directed the original Band Aid video "Do They Know It's Christmas?". In 1986, Dick moved to Los Angeles to direct his first feature film, P.I. Private Investigations (1987), starring Ray Sharkey and Martin Balsam. Since then, he has directed more than twenty documentaries and feature films and over three hundred music videos.

In 1986, he co-founded Propaganda Films, which became a major production company for commercials and music videos.

Dick directed the Britney Spears videos "...Baby One More Time", "(You Drive Me) Crazy", "Sometimes", and "Oops!... I Did It Again", the Band Aid video "Do They Know It's Christmas?", and over 500 other music videos. Other groups whose videos he has directed include Backstreet Boys and Guns N' Roses.

In 1999, Dick directed MTV's first made-for-TV feature 2gether. The film spawned a TV series and two albums. Dick co-wrote a number of songs on the first album which reached the US Top-40 chart. In 2003, he directed Seeing Double for Simon Fuller's 19 Entertainment, which starred British pop act S Club.

In 2008, E! Television announced that Dick would be co-exec producing an observational documentary TV series starring Pamela Anderson titled: Pam: Girl On The Loose.

The artists and bands Dick has directed to date include The Offspring, Britney Spears, Backstreet Boys, Jessica Simpson, Cher, Breaking Benjamin, Anastacia, Carly Simon, Def Leppard, Steve Lukather, Nickelback, Oasis, Kula Shaker, Toni Braxton, Good Charlotte, Green Day, Il Divo, Elton John, Ricky Martin, Paul McCartney, Amy Lee, Tina Turner, Celine Dion, R.E.M., Gloria Estefan, S Club, Pussycat Dolls, Tears for Fears and Ozzy Osbourne.

== Awards ==
Dick's film work has won three MTV awards, two Billboard Awards and three MVPA awards. His videos have won a BRIT Award and been nominated for more than twenty MTV Video Music Awards, sixteen MuchMusic Video Awards and a Grammy Award. His personal nominations include a Cable Ace Award.

In 2000, Dick was given a Lifetime Achievement Award in the MPVA Awards.

== Musician ==
Dick was a founding member of pub-rock act and Stiff Records house band The Stiff All Stars. The band was briefly signed to Stiff Records competitor Chiswick Records in 1980 and subsequently released four singles. Band line-up was Andy Murray (guitar, vocals), Nigel Dick (bass, vocals), Pete Glenister (guitar), Nicky Graham (keys), Nick Garnett (drums) Hugh Attwooll (drums). Despite the band's name, only Murray and Dick actually worked at Stiff Records; Glenister went on to write and produce for Alison Moyet, Kirsty MacColl, Darius; Graham went on to write and produce Bros. The band appeared on TV, toured frequently and supported Jools Holland, Any Trouble, Madness amongst others. Jamie West-Oram featured in an early line-up but left to join The Fixx. Thirty years after the release of their first single The Stiff All Stars released their first album '12.5 on a 10 Point Scale' which featured new tracks and previously unreleased songs featuring Jeff Porcaro (Toto) and Carl Verheyen (Supertramp).

Dick also appeared four times as a backing musician on BBC's famous 'Top of the Pops': three times with Jona Lewie ('Kitchen at Parties', 'Stop The Cavalry') and once with The Snowmen ('Hokey Cokey').

As a guitarist, he has released three albums:

- Flesh, Blood, Wood, Steel
- All Stars And All Sorts
- Weird Stain

== Travels ==
Dick travels by bicycle and has made cycle tours in fourteen countries, including the United States, Canada, Mexico, New Zealand, Australia, Thailand, Vietnam, and various European countries, including the United Kingdom.

== Selected music video credits (as director) ==
Year	Song	Artist
1983	"I Think I'll Get My Haircut"	Jona Lewie
1983	"Straight Ahead"	Kool & the Gang
1984	"Mothers Talk"	Tears for Fears
1984	"Shout"	Tears for Fears
1984	"Do They Know It's Christmas?"	Band Aid
1985	"Everybody Wants to Rule the World"	Tears for Fears
1985	"Head over Heels"	Tears for Fears
1985	"I Believe (A Soulful Re-Recording)"	Tears for Fears
1985	"Living on the Borderline"	Smash Palace
1987	"Welcome to the Jungle"	Guns N' Roses
1988	"Sweet Child o' Mine"	Guns N' Roses
1988	"Paradise City"	Guns N' Roses
1988	"Rocket"	Def Leppard
1989	"Patience"	Guns N' Roses
1990	"Love Will Lead You Back"	Taylor Dayne
1991	"Auberge"	Chris Rhea
1992	"TV Crimes"	Black Sabbath
1993	"Right By Your Side"	Enuff Z'Nuff
1993	"Another Night"	Real McCoy
1993	"Down in a Hole"	Alice in Chains
1994	"Rock 'n' Roll Star"	Oasis
1995	"Wonderwall"	Oasis
1995	"Run Away" US version	Real McCoy
1996	"Falling into You"	Celine Dion
1996	"It's All Coming Back to Me Now"	Celine Dion
1996	"Tattva"	Kula Shaker
1996	"Wide Open Space"	Mansun
1996	"Don't Look Back in Anger"	Oasis
1996	"Champagne Supernova"	Oasis
1996	"A Thousand Times a Day"	Patty Loveless
1996	"Slang"	Def Leppard
1996	"Work It Out"	Def Leppard
1997	"As Long as You Love Me"	Backstreet Boys
1997	"All I Have to Give" TV Version / DVD Version	Backstreet Boys
1997	"Push"	Matchbox Twenty
1997	"When the Angels Sing	Social Distortion
1997	"Gone Away"	The Offspring
1997	"How's It Going to Be"	Third Eye Blind
1997	"I Want You"	Savage Garden
1997	"To the Moon and Back"	Savage Garden
1998	"Don't Go Away"	Oasis
1998	"Shorty (You Keep Playing with My Mind)"	Imajin featuring Keith Murray
1998	"Only When I Sleep"	The Corrs
1998	"...Baby One More Time"	Britney Spears
1998	"Cruel Summer"	Ace of Base
1998	"When the Lights Go Out" US version	Five
1998	"I Want to Spend My Lifetime Loving You"	Marc Anthony & Tina Arena
1999	"At My Most Beautiful"	R.E.M.
1999	"Sometimes"	Britney Spears
1999	"(You Drive Me) Crazy (The Stop! Remix)"	Britney Spears
1999	"I'm Outta Love"	Anastacia
1999	"Believe"	Cher
1999	"Don't Say You Love Me"	M2M
1999	"Strong Enough"	Cher
1999	"Me, Myself & I"	Vitamin C
2000	"Oops!... I Did It Again"	Britney Spears
2000	"I Think I'm in Love With You"	Jessica Simpson
2000	"Swear It Again" (U.S. version)	Westlife
2000	"Hemorrhage (In My Hands)"	Fuel
2000	"Breathless"	The Corrs
2000	"Innocent"	Fuel
2000	"Tell Me"	Mel B
2000	"Pretty Boy"	M2M
2000	"I Wanna Be with You"	Mandy Moore
2001	"Drops of Jupiter (Tell Me)"	Train
2001	"Cowboys & Kisses"	Anastacia
2001	"Bad Day"	Fuel
2001	"Drowning" Second Version	Backstreet Boys
2001	"Astounded"	Tantric
2001	"Aroma"	Pru
2001	"For You"	Staind
2002	"Too Bad"	Nickelback
2002	"Never Again"	Nickelback
2002	"Hero"	Chad Kroeger (featuring Josey Scott)
2002	"That's What Girls Do"	No Secrets
2002	"Kids in America"	No Secrets
2002	"Alive"	S Club
2003	"Someday"	Nickelback
2003	"Like What	Tommi (group)
2004	"Out of the Blue"	Delta Goodrem
2004	"Vindicated"	Dashboard Confessional (Spider-Man 2 soundtrack)
2004	"Broken"	Seether (featuring Amy Lee)
2004	"Angel"	The Corrs
2004	"Everything to Me"	Brooke Hogan
2005	"Far Away"	Nickelback
2005	"Blind"	Lifehouse
2005	"Dancing"	Mai Kuraki
2005	"Photograph"	Nickelback
2005	"Stickwitu"	Pussycat Dolls
2006	"Always on Your Side"	Sheryl Crow & Sting
2006	"Savin' Me"	Nickelback
2006	"Rock On"	Def Leppard
2006	"The Time of Our Lives"	Il Divo & Toni Braxton
2007	"Better Than Me"	Hinder
2008	"Absolutely Positively"	Anastacia
2008	"Gotta Be Somebody"	Nickelback
2008	"Underneath the Same Sky"	Kenny Loggins
2009	"I'd Come for You"	Nickelback
2009	"If Today Was Your Last Day"	Nickelback
2009	"Never Gonna Be Alone"	Nickelback
2009	"Burn It to the Ground"	Nickelback
2009	"I Love This Town"	Clive Gregson
2009	"Constant as the Wind"	Carl Verheyen
2009	"First There Is a Mountain"	Kenny Loggins
2010	"Give Me a Sign"	Breaking Benjamin
2010	"Ambitions"	Joe McElderry
2010	"Monster High Fright Song"	Monster High
2010	"This Afternoon"	Nickelback
2010	"Fever"	Bullet for My Valentine
2010	"Bittersweet Memories"	Bullet for My Valentine
2010	"Pretend"	Destinee & Paris
2010	"Not a Love Song"	Wonderland
2010	"Lose My Mind"	The Wanted
2011	"Bittersweet"	Clive Gregson
2011	"The Road Divides"; Live DVD	Carl Verheyen
2011	"Wranglin'"	3 Boxes
2011	"Gold Forever"	The Wanted
2011	"Starlight"	Wonderland
2011	"The Last Goodbye"	David Cook
2011	"Something To Say"	The Brilliant Things
2011	"Give"	LeAnn Rimes
2012	"Forbidden Kiss"	Frank Gambale
2012	"Lullaby"	Nickelback
2012	"Start of Something Good"	Daughtry
2012	"Bang, Bang"	Beth Hart
2013	"Borrowed"	LeAnn Rimes
2013	"Spirit of Julia"	Carl Verheyen
2013	"These Things You Do"	Billie Rainbird
2013	"Cantik Calls"	Billie Rainbird
2013	"My Kind of Girl"	Clive Gregson
2014	"A Billion Girls"	Elyar Fox
2014	"Dirt"	Florida Georgia Line
2014	"Wastin' Gas"	Dallas Smith
2014	"All I Want for Christmas is You"	Fifth Harmony
2015	"Lifted"	Dallas Smith
2015	"She Keeps Me Up"	Nickelback
2015	"Get 'Em Up"	Nickelback
2015	"Satellite"	Nickelback
2015	"Kids with Cars"	Dallas Smith
2016	"Behind the Sun"	Fastball
2017	"I Will Never Let You Down"	Fastball
2017	"We're On Our Way"	Fastball
2017	"Song on Fire"	Nickelback
2022	"Those Days"	Nickelback
2026	"Make Me Love You"	Nickelback

== Credits as director (feature films) ==
- Berlin Calling (2014) Berlin Calling
- Pam: Girl on the Loose (2008)
- In Search of the Lanterne Rouge (currently in production) rougefilm
- Callback (2005) callbackthemovie
- Seeing Double (2003)
- 2gether (2000)
- The Elevator (1996) (co-director, one segment)
- Dead Connection (1993)
- Deadly Intent (1988)
- P.I. Private Investigations (1987)

== Credits as screenwriter (feature films) ==
- Berlin Calling (2014) (co-writer) Berlin Calling
- Stella Roxx and The Killer Bats From Hell (2006)
- Sidewalking (2004)
- Callback (1999)
- Everlasting (1995)
- Country Lyfe (1994)
- Hangman (1994)
- Introducing Eric (1993) (story by Nigel Dick)
- One Week in April (1990)
- Deadly Intent (1988) (uncredited)
- P.I. Private Investigations (1987) (story by Nigel Dick)
