= Sea Groove =

"Sea Groove" may refer to:

- "Sea Groove", a song by Nickelback from the album Curb, 1996
- "Sea Groove", a song by Big Boss Man released as a single in 2000
