= This Afternoon =

2010 single by Nickelback

Single by Nickelback

from the album Dark Horse
- Released: March 23, 2010
- Recorded: March–July 2008
- Studio: Mountain View (Abbotsford, British Columbia)
- Genre: Country rock; pop rock
- Length: 4:34 (album version); 4:14 (clean/radio edit)
- Label: Roadrunner
- Songwriters: Chad Kroeger, Robert John "Mutt" Lange, Mike Kroeger, Ryan Peake
- Producer: Robert John "Mutt" Lange

Nickelback singles chronology
"Shakin' Hands" (2009)	"This Afternoon" (2010)	"When We Stand Together" (2011)

Music video
- "This Afternoon" on YouTube

"This Afternoon" is a song by Canadian rock band Nickelback. It is the eighth and final single from their album Dark Horse, released on March 23, 2010.

== Music video ==
The music video for the song was released on May 4, 2010 and was directed by Nigel Dick.

In the video, a fraternity of college geeks throws a huge party to "prove to the world that the nerd brigade knows how to rock". One member is tasked with supplying the beer; another is assigned to find hot women to attend the party. Then another member arrives after having kidnapped Nickelback to play at the party; the fraternity leader however remarks "... Nickelback? You got me Nickelback?! ... Alright, fine, they'll do." The party then proceeds as Nickelback are forced by 2 football players, after the leader says, "Boys, get 'Em in there!" to play their song.

The video for "This Afternoon" was first shown on the Fuse website and can now be seen as their 'Video Of The Day' for May 1, 2010.

The song contains strong lyrical content suggestive of cannabis use and production, including an allusion to Bob Marley as well as Cheech and Chong.

== Track listing ==
CD single (Japanese release)

1. "This Afternoon" (Single Edit)
2. "Next Go Round"
3. "This Afternoon" (Instrumental)

CD single (European release)

1. "This Afternoon" (Single Edit)
2. "How You Remind Me" (Live) (taken from Live at Home)

== Chart performance ==
The song has been a success on the Billboard Hot 100, peaking at number thirty-four. It is the band's highest-charting single since "If Today Was Your Last Day" and is also the band's 10th and final top-forty song to date.

In Germany, the song debuted at No. 84, but climbed quickly. In its third week it reached the top fifty by jumping to No. 49 and in its seventh week it entered the top thirty by reaching No. 29

In July 2010, the video landed on CMT's Top Twenty Countdown at number 13 and went into medium rotation on the channel.

=== Weekly charts ===
Chart (2010–11)	Peak position
Australia (ARIA)	27
Austria (Ö3 Austria Top 40)	27
Belgium (Ultratip Bubbling Under Wallonia)	39
Canada Hot 100 (Billboard)	16
Canada AC (Billboard)	39
Canada CHR/Top 40 (Billboard)	9
Canada Hot AC (Billboard)	3
Canada Rock (Billboard)	24
Germany (GfK)	29
Hungary (Rádiós Top 40)	9
Netherlands (Dutch Top 40)	24
Netherlands (Single Top 100)	74
Slovakia Airplay (ČNS IFPI)	70
Switzerland (Schweizer Hitparade)	69
UK Singles (Official Charts)	79
UK Rock & Metal (Official Charts)	2
US Billboard Hot 100	34
US Adult Pop Airplay (Billboard)	4
US Pop Airplay (Billboard)	24

=== Year-end charts ===
Chart (2010)	Position
Canada (Canadian Hot 100)	58
Hungary (Rádiós Top 40)	85
US Adult Top 40 (billboard)	17
Chart (2011)	Position
Hungary (Rádiós Top 40)	80

== Certifications ==
Region	Certification	Certified units/sales
Australia (ARIA)	Gold	35,000^{^}
Canada (Music Canada)	2× Platinum	160,000^{‡}
United States (RIAA)	2× Platinum	2,000,000^{‡}
^{^} Shipments figures based on certification alone.^{‡} Sales+streaming figures based on certification alone.
