= Jon St. Elwood =

American actor

- Born: October 24, 1952 (age 73); Los Angeles, California, US
- Died: Yountville, California, US
- Other name: John Mullins
- Occupation: Actor
- Notable work: 1970s to 1980s

Jon St. Elwood (born October 24, 1952) is an actor whose film and television career began in the late 1970s and carried on until around the late 1980s. He is familiar to soap opera fans as tough guy Jazz Jackson in the daytime soap opera The Young and the Restless, a role he played for a couple of years in the mid-1980s. He also acted in the films, The Child Stealer in 1979, They Call Me Bruce? in 1982, and Against All Odds in 1984.

== Personal life ==
Born on October 24, 1952, and originally from Los Angeles, California, St. Elwood is from Phoenix Arizona. In his younger years, and having the issues that juveniles have, for two years his life was structured under the Gary Job Corps vocational and educational training center which years later in 1986, he attributed to his own development as a person and a Christian. Prior to becoming an actor, he worked in some low paying jobs which included moving rocks and furniture removal. He was also a plumbers mate and a night-club bouncer. He even attended the Phoenix Police Academy for a while, but opted to try medical related work.

In early 1985, he received the Los Angeles Sentinel's Community Service Award for his work with the American Cancer Society and some other organizations.

In October 1985, St. Elwood was married to former neighbor and friend Irene Hubbard at the Historical Wedding Chapel in Burbank, California. Prior to their becoming man and wife, he had known her for seven years. Cast members, Stephanie Williams (Who played Amy) and Susan Seaforth Hayes (who played Joanna), with her husband Bill Hayes, attended the small ceremony.

On September 19, 2023, Jon St. Elwood died at the veterans home in Yountville, California.

== Career ==
=== 1970s ===
One of his earliest roles was as Skelly in Mel Damski's 1979 film, The Child Stealer which starred Beau Bridges, Blair Brown, and Cristina Raines. Also that year he appeared as Private Reuss in part 1 of "Good Bye, Radar", from the series M*A*S*H which aired on the 10th of August. He also appeared as Manu in the "Demon's Triangle" episode of A Man Called Sloane which starred Robert Conrad. It aired on October 20, 1979.

=== 1980s ===
In 1980, he appeared as Darryl in an episode of The White Shadow, "The Stripper". He appeared in Tayor Hackford's film Against All Odds which starred Rachel Ward, Jeff Bridges, Richard Widmark, and James Woods. He played the part of Ahmad Cooper in this 1984 film.

He landed an on-going role as Jazz Jackson in Young & the Restless that went from 1983 to 1986. According to Connie Passalacqua's article in The Northwest Arkansas Times. It was after two months of playing his role that his acting ability impressed the powers at Young & the Restless enough to expand his role. Elwwood's character as Mob leg breaker, now a bad-guy-turned-good, Jazz Jackson was already established by the time Phil Morris came in to play his brother Tyrone Jackson. The character Jazz who originally got involved with a crime syndicate so he could put younger brother Tyrone through law school, ended up killing mobster Tony DiSalvo and would end up working as an operative for PIs, Andy Richards and Paul Williams.

In June, 1985, along with Don Cornelius, Raymond St. Jacques, Bo Svenson, and Melba Moore, he was a presenter at the Ninth Annual BRE awards.

Around 1987, he appeared as T-Bone in "Shades", an episode of Hunter which also featured Frank Silvera.

In addition to acting, St. Elwood had written poetry, some of which were published in magazines.

== Filmography ==
Film
Title	Role	Director	Year	Notes #
The Child Stealer	Skelly	Mel Damski	1979	as John Mullens
They Call Me Bruce?	Street Tough	Elliott Hong	1982	
48 Hrs.	Plain clothes man	Walter Hill	1982	
Repo Man	Miner	Alex Cox	1984	
Against All Odds	Ahmad Cooper	Taylor Hackford	1984	
P.I. Private Investigations	Gil	Nigel Dick	1987	

Television episodes
Title	Episode	Role	Director	Year	Notes #
M*A*S*H	Good Bye, Radar Pt. 1	Private Reuss	Charles S. Dubin	1979	
A Man Called Sloane	Demon's Triangle	Manu	Michael Preece	1979	
The White Shadow	The Stripper	Darryl	Victor Lobl	1980	
Taxi	Out of Commission	The Boxer	James Burrows	1981	
The Young & the Restless	Various episodes from 1983 to 1986	Jazz Jackson	Various	1983 to 1986	
Hardcastle and McCormick	Scared Stiff	Lieutenant Barger	Tony Mordente	1984	
What's Happening Now!	Dee's Suitor		Arlando Smith	1987	
Hill Street Blues	The Runner Falls on His Kisser	Jimmy Shields	Ken Lavet	1987	
Hunter	Shades	T-Bone Williams	Michael Preece	1987	
E! True Hollywood Story	The Young and the Restless	Himself		2001	
