= Hesher =

Hesher may refer to:

- Fan of heavy metal subculture
- Hesher (film), a 2010 drama film starring Joseph Gordon-Levitt
- Hesher (EP), a 1996 EP album by Nickelback
