= P.I. Private Investigations =

- Theatrical release poster
- Directed by: Nigel Dick
- Screenplay by: John Dahl; David W. Warfield
- Story by: Nigel Dick
- Starring: Clayton Rohner; Ray Sharkey
- Cinematography: David Bridges; Bryan Duggan
- Edited by: Scott Chestnut
- Music by: Murray Munro
- Production companies: Metro-Goldwyn-Mayer; PolyGram Movies
- Distributed by: MGM/UA Communications Co.
- Release date: June 5, 1987
- Country: United States
- Language: English

P.I. Private Investigations (also known as Private Investigations) is a 1987 crime-thriller film directed by Nigel Dick and starring Clayton Rohner, Ray Sharkey and Paul Le Mat.

== Plot ==
Charles Bradley, a newspaper editor, establishes contact with Kim, a whistleblower with evidence of corrupt Los Angeles Police Department officers dealing stolen drugs. The pair agree to meet so Kim can give Charles his evidence in exchange for a cash payment. A private investigator working for Charles to monitor the corrupt officers has his cover blown and breaks into the apartment of Charles's son Joey, where he hides a wiretap recording of Charles and Kim's conversation before being killed by Ryan, one of the corrupt cops.

Joey returns home, finds the P.I.'s body, and listens to the recording, writing down a code discussed by Charles and Kim. He later gives the tape to Detective Wexler and details its contents. Ryan is informed that Joey has heard the code and returns to the apartment to kill him. However, he loses track of Joey while tailing him, causing him to miss two carjackers stealing Joey's car at a convenience store. As a result, he kills the carjackers and assumes he has killed Joey. Wexler advises Joey to hide somewhere and promises to send an officer to protect him. Joey hides at his sister's future home, but Ryan is the officer sent to stay with him. Joey barely realizes Ryan is the killer in enough time to get away. As he flees, he is struck by Jenny Fox, a passing motorist who takes him in when he warns that Ryan is chasing him.

Jenny takes Joey to her home, where she dresses his wounds and gives him clothing an ex-boyfriend left with her. At his request, she brings him to the recording studio where his friend Eddie works. Eddie lends Joey his car and informs him that Charles called the studio, leaving a message for Joey to meet a man named Larry at a nearby oil field. At the oil field, Joey meets Larry, the partner of the murdered P.I. While they discuss the situation, two other corrupt cops ambush them. They kill Larry and attempt to torture Joey for the code, but Joey uses pepper spray given to him by Jenny to escape.

Back in the city, Joey is mistakenly arrested due to a misunderstanding with Eddie's car. Eddie arrives to free him, but while Joey is at the station, Ryan sees him and once again gives chase. Joey manages to get away and flees back to Jenny's home, where they spend the night together. The next morning, Joey sees a clock next to Jenny's bed and realizes the meaning of the code: the date, time, and map coordinates of Charles and Kim's planned meeting. Furthermore, Joey realizes that Wexler is the ringleader of the plot and has known the code's meaning the entire time; the corrupt cops' attempts to kill him were to prevent him from alerting Charles to this fact, as they are planning to ambush Charles and Kim at the meeting point.

Joey and Jenny race to the meeting point, and Joey goes ahead, discovering Ryan about to shoot at Charles. He destabilizes the structure Ryan was using as a vantage point, causing the corrupt cops to realize they have been discovered. They open fire, killing Kim while Charles takes cover. However, Kim's driver returns fire and joins Charles, revealing that he is Kim; he switched places with a decoy in order to fool any potential attackers. Jenny drives in to rescue Joey, while Wexler is bitten by a rattlesnake while escaping with Kim's briefcase. Joey returns in Jenny's car, distracting Ryan before he can kill Charles and Kim, and hits Ryan with the car, killing him. Before leaving the area, Kim reveals that the briefcase Wexler took was a decoy and hands over the real one with the evidence. Elsewhere, Wexler checks his case and discovers it full of blank sheets of paper. He falls to the ground, realizing his defeat as he succumbs to the snake bite.

In the aftermath, Joey and Jenny begin dating, and Charles's story is published, exposing and destroying the corrupt cops' drug ring.

== Cast ==
- Clayton Rohner as Joey Bradley
- Ray Sharkey as Ryan
- Paul Le Mat as Detective Wexler
- Talia Balsam as Jenny Fox
- Phil Morris as Eddie Gordon
- Martin Balsam as Cliff Dowling
- William Kerwin as Anthony
- Anthony Zerbe as Charles Bradley, Joey's Father
- Robert Ito as Kim
- Vernon Wells as Detective North
- Anthony Geary as Larry
- Justin Lord as Howard White
- Richard Cummings Jr. as Hollister
- Desiree Boschetti as Denise
- Andy Romano as Mr. Watson
- Sydney Walsh as Janet
- Jon St. Elwood as Gil
- Robert Torti as Burglar
- Nigel Dick as Photographer
