= I'd Come for You =

Single by Nickelback

from the album Dark Horse
- Released: March 23, 2009
- Recorded: March–July 2008
- Studio: Mountain View Studios, Abbotsford, British Columbia
- Genre: Alternative rock; pop rock; post-grunge
- Length: 4:22 (album version); 3:58 (edited version)
- Label: Roadrunner
- Songwriters: Robert John "Mutt" Lange; Chad Kroeger
- Producer: Robert John "Mutt" Lange

Nickelback singles chronology
"If Today Was Your Last Day" (2008)	"I'd Come for You" (2009)	"Burn It to the Ground" (2009)

Music video
- "I'd Come for You" on YouTube

"I'd Come for You" is the second European single (fourth in Canada) from Nickelback's 2008 album Dark Horse. The song was written by the band and Mutt Lange. It was released March 23, 2009. "If Today Was Your Last Day" served as the third single instead in North America (after "Gotta Be Somebody" and the rock radio-only single "Something in Your Mouth"). Lyrically the song is emotional and not sexual, as some originally inferred from the title.

== Music video ==
In an interview Chad Kroeger said they wanted to get Kevin Costner to star as the father in the video. Costner asked Chad Kroeger to be in one of their videos when they met previously. But when shooting for the video came along he was unable to make it.

Jessa Danielson, Don Broach and Craig Anderson play the three roles in the video. The video was shot in late January 2009 with long-time collaborator Nigel Dick directing the video. The video was released on March 23, 2009, in Canada. The video shows a father arriving home to find his daughter on her way out to go on a date with her boyfriend. Later on the boyfriend tries to sexually assault the daughter, who makes a frantic cut-off call to her father, then sends a text message with the same numbers, 7 7, showing in a photograph of the daughter and the father by a baseball field. He realizes she is in a situation at the baseball field, therefore, he goes looking for her. He arrives in time to pull the young man out of the car and punches him once before grabbing his keys. The young man charges at him with a crowbar, after which the father grabs the crowbar, then punches him again, knocking him to the ground, then throwing the keys, then drives off with her crying in his arms. Shots throughout the video shows the band performing inside a concert garden.

== Track listing ==
1. "I'd Come For You" (Album Version)
2. "I'd Come For You" (Edit)

=== German Track Listing ===
1. "I'd Come For You" (Edit)
2. "I'd Come For You" (Album Version)
3. "Far Away" (Live At Sturgis 2006)

=== Japan Track Listing ===
1. "I'd Come For You" (Edit)
2. "I'd Come For You" (Album Version)
3. "Photograph" (Live At Sturgis 2006)

== Chart performance ==
"I'd Come for You" experienced chart success prior to its release as a single. Following Dark Horse's release, the song climbed as high as #14 on the U.S. iTunes Store, fueling a #44 debut on the Billboard Hot 100. It also debuted the same week at #53 on the Canadian Hot 100 and re-entered the chart months later rising to #29. The song also peaked to #1 on the UK Rock Chart.

== Charts ==
=== Weekly charts ===
Chart (2008–09)	Peak position
Australia (ARIA)	22
Austria (Ö3 Austria Top 40)	37
Canada Hot 100 (Billboard)	29
Canada CHR/Top 40 (Billboard)	19
Canada Hot AC (Billboard)	5
Germany (GfK)	39
Netherlands (Dutch Top 40)	20
Switzerland (Schweizer Hitparade)	38
UK Singles (OCC)	67
UK Rock & Metal (OCC)	1
US Billboard Hot 100	44

=== Year-end charts ===
Chart (2009)	Position
Netherlands (Dutch Top 40)	96

== Certifications ==
Region	Certification	Certified units/sales
Canada (Music Canada)	Platinum	80,000^{‡}
^{‡} Sales+streaming figures based on certification alone.
