= Dark Horse Tour =

2008–10 concert tour by Nickelback

- Promotional world tour by Nickelback
- Location: North America; Australia; Europe
- Associated album: Dark Horse
- Start date: September 8, 2008
- End date: October 30, 2010
- Legs: 9
- No. of shows: 155

Nickelback concert chronology
- All the Right Reasons Tour (2005–07); Dark Horse Tour (2008–10); Here and Now Tour (2012–13)

The Dark Horse Tour was a worldwide concert tour by Canadian rock band Nickelback. It was their first world tour since the conclusion of their massive All the Right Reasons Tour, ending on September 2, 2007, in Kansas City, Missouri. The tour was in support of their new album Dark Horse (2008). Dates were announced on November 26, 2008. Seether and Saving Abel were the opening acts on the tour. On the second half of the North American tour, Hinder, Papa Roach, and Saving Abel were in support. Black Stone Cherry were the support act for the European tour of the UK in May 2009.

During the tour, Ryan Peake sang for a cover of "Use Somebody" by Kings of Leon during an encore. During the UK leg of the tour, they sang a cover of "Highway to Hell" by AC/DC with Chris Robertson of Black Stone Cherry on vocals, just before the T-shirt cannons. A similar format was applied during the rest of the tour, however they sang a cover of "Hey Man, Nice Shot" by Filter with Shaun Morgan of Seether on vocals. In some of the early shows, "This Afternoon" was played instead of "If Today Was Your Last Day". During the summer leg of the tour the band sang "Highway to Hell" with Austin John Winkler of Hinder and Jacoby Shaddix of Papa Roach. On some stops they played "Friends in Low Places" by Garth Brooks and "Tequila Makes Her Clothes Fall Off" by Joe Nichols acoustically. The rock band Sick Puppies supported Nickelback in Australia. On the 2010 European leg of the tour, it was confirmed that Daughtry would support Nickelback on all of the Europe dates. They also announced more dates for the spring of 2010 that takes place in select venues in Canada and the United States. Breaking Benjamin, Shinedown, and Sick Puppies have been confirmed to be the opening. They also announced a tour that would take place in the Fall of 2010 with Three Days Grace and Buckcherry as supporting acts.

According to Billboard magazine, Nickelback played in front of 1,046,973 people on the 2009 North American section of the tour. In the same section, Nickelback grossed $49,908,542 from the tour. Overall, worldwide the band grossed $57.8 million from the 2009 section of the tour. In the 2010 North American section of the tour the band grossed $35,035,196, and they played in front of 497,072 people. Overall, worldwide the 2010 section of the tour grossed $44.5 million. By July 2010, a total of more than 1.6 million tickets had been sold.

== Tour dates ==
List of concerts, showing date, city, country, venue and opening act
| Date | City | Country | Venue | Opening act |
Europe (warm–up leg)
| September 8, 2008 | Cologne | Germany | Lanxess Arena | —N/a |
| September 9, 2008 | Stuttgart | Germany | Schleyerhalle | —N/a |
| September 12, 2008 | Belfast | Northern Ireland | Odyssey Arena | —N/a |
| September 13, 2008 | Dublin | Ireland | RDS Simmonscourt | —N/a |
| September 15, 2008 | Manchester | England | Manchester Arena | —N/a |
| September 16, 2008 | Sheffield | England | Sheffield Arena | —N/a |
| September 18, 2008 | Birmingham | England | NEC Arena | —N/a |
| September 19, 2008 | London | England | O_{2} Arena | —N/a |
| September 21, 2008 | London | England | Wembley Arena | —N/a |
Leg 1 — North America
| February 25, 2009 | Nashville | United States | Sommet Center | Seether; Saving Abel |
| February 27, 2009 | Lexington | United States | Rupp Arena | Seether; Saving Abel |
| February 28, 2009 | Detroit | United States | Joe Louis Arena | Seether; Saving Abel |
| March 2, 2009 | Toronto | Canada | Air Canada Centre | Seether; Saving Abel |
| March 3, 2009 | Hamilton | Canada | Copps Coliseum | Seether; Saving Abel |
| March 5, 2009 | Worcester | United States | DCU Center | Seether; Saving Abel |
| March 6, 2009 | East Rutherford | United States | Izod Center | Seether; Saving Abel |
| March 8, 2009 | Uncasville | United States | Mohegan Sun Arena | Seether; Saving Abel |
| March 9, 2009 | Philadelphia | United States | Wachovia Center | Seether; Saving Abel |
| March 11, 2009 | Columbus | United States | Nationwide Arena | Seether; Saving Abel |
| March 12, 2009 | Rosemont | United States | Allstate Arena | Seether; Saving Abel |
| March 14, 2009 | Milwaukee | United States | Bradley Center | Seether; Saving Abel |
| March 15, 2009 | Moline | United States | iWireless Center | Seether; Saving Abel |
| March 17, 2009 | Omaha | United States | Qwest Events Center | Seether; Saving Abel |
| March 18, 2009 | Des Moines | United States | Wells Fargo Arena | Seether; Saving Abel |
| April 1, 2009 | Edmonton | Canada | Rexall Place | Seether; Saving Abel |
| April 2, 2009 | Calgary | Canada | Pengrowth Saddledome | Seether; Saving Abel |
| April 4, 2009 | Saskatoon | Canada | Credit Union Centre | Seether; Saving Abel |
| April 5, 2009 | Winnipeg | Canada | MTS Centre | Seether; Saving Abel |
| April 7, 2009 | Minneapolis | United States | Target Center | Seether; Saving Abel |
| April 8, 2009 | Kansas City | United States | Sprint Center | Seether; Saving Abel |
| April 10, 2009 | Tulsa | United States | BOK Center | Seether; Saving Abel |
| April 11, 2009 | Dallas | United States | SuperPages.com Center | Seether; Saving Abel |
| April 13, 2009 | Bossier City | United States | CenturyTel Center | Seether; Saving Abel |
| April 14, 2009 | San Antonio | United States | AT&T Center | Seether; Saving Abel |
| April 16, 2009 | Houston | United States | Toyota Center | Seether; Saving Abel |
| April 17, 2009 | New Orleans | United States | New Orleans Arena | Seether; Saving Abel |
| April 19, 2009 | North Little Rock | United States | Alltel Arena | Seether; Saving Abel |
| April 22, 2009 | Jacksonville | United States | Jacksonville Veterans Memorial Arena | Seether; Saving Abel |
| April 23, 2009 | Atlanta | United States | Lakewood Amphitheater | Seether; Saving Abel |
| April 25, 2009 | West Palm Beach | United States | Cruzan Amphitheatre | Seether; Saving Abel |
| April 26, 2009 | Tampa | United States | Ford Amphitheatre | Seether; Saving Abel |
Leg 2 — Europe
| May 22, 2009 | Manchester | England | Manchester Arena | Black Stone Cherry |
| May 23, 2009 | Glasgow | Scotland | S.E.C.C. Arena | Black Stone Cherry |
| May 25, 2009 | Newcastle upon Tyne | England | Metro Radio Arena | Black Stone Cherry |
| May 26, 2009 | Birmingham | England | National Indoor Arena | Black Stone Cherry |
| May 28, 2009 | London | England | The O_{2} Arena | Black Stone Cherry |
| May 29, 2009 | Sheffield | England | Sheffield Arena | Black Stone Cherry |
Leg 3 — North America
| July 10, 2009 | Darien Center | United States | Darien Lake Performing Arts Center | Hinder; Papa Roach; Saving Abel |
| July 11, 2009 | Camden | United States | Susquehanna Bank Center | Hinder; Papa Roach; Saving Abel |
| July 14, 2009 | Scranton | United States | Toyota Pavilion at Montage Mountain | Hinder; Papa Roach; Saving Abel |
| July 15, 2009 | Wantagh | United States | Nikon at Jones Beach Theater | Hinder; Papa Roach; Saving Abel |
| July 17, 2009 | Hershey | United States | Hersheypark Stadium | Hinder; Papa Roach; Saving Abel |
| July 18, 2009 | Burgettstown | United States | Post-Gazette Pavilion | Hinder; Papa Roach; Saving Abel |
| July 21, 2009 | Holmdel | United States | PNC Bank Arts Center | Hinder; Papa Roach; Saving Abel |
| July 22, 2009 | Saratoga | United States | Saratoga Performing Arts Center | Hinder; Papa Roach; Saving Abel |
| July 24, 2009 | Mansfield | United States | Comcast Center for the Performing Arts | Hinder; Papa Roach; Saving Abel |
| July 25, 2009 | Hartford | United States | Comcast Theatre | Hinder; Papa Roach; Saving Abel |
| July 28, 2009 | Virginia Beach | United States | Verizon Wireless Amphitheatre | Hinder; Papa Roach; Saving Abel |
| July 29, 2009 | Bristow | United States | Nissan Pavilion | Hinder; Papa Roach; Saving Abel |
| July 31, 2009 | Charlotte | United States | Verizon Wireless Amphitheatre | Hinder; Papa Roach; Saving Abel |
| August 1, 2009 | Raleigh | United States | Time Warner Cable Music Pavilion | Hinder; Papa Roach; Saving Abel |
| August 9, 2009 | Toronto | Canada | ~~Molson Amphitheatre~~ Cancelled due to bad weather | Hinder; Papa Roach; Saving Abel |
| August 11, 2009 | Clarkston | United States | DTE Energy Music Theatre | Hinder; Papa Roach; Saving Abel |
| August 12, 2009 | Clarkston | United States | DTE Energy Music Theatre | Hinder; Papa Roach; Saving Abel |
| August 14, 2009 | Cuyahoga Falls | United States | Blossom Music Center | Hinder; Papa Roach; Saving Abel |
| August 15, 2009 | Noblesville | United States | Verizon Wireless Music Center | Hinder; Papa Roach; Saving Abel |
| August 17, 2009 | Pelham | United States | Verizon Wireless Music Center | Hinder; Papa Roach; Saving Abel |
| August 18, 2009 | Pelham | United States | Verizon Wireless Music Center | Hinder; Papa Roach; Saving Abel |
| August 19, 2009 | Cincinnati | United States | Riverbend Music Center | Hinder; Papa Roach; Saving Abel |
| August 21, 2009 | Tinley Park | United States | First Midwest Bank Amphitheatre | Hinder; Papa Roach; Saving Abel |
| August 22, 2009 | Maryland Heights | United States | Verizon Wireless Amphitheatre | Hinder; Papa Roach; Saving Abel |
| August 25, 2009 | Greenwood Village | United States | Fiddler's Green Amphitheatre | Hinder; Papa Roach; Saving Abel |
| August 26, 2009 | West Valley City | United States | USANA Amphitheatre | Hinder; Papa Roach; Saving Abel |
| August 28, 2009 | Ridgefield | United States | Clark County Amphitheatre | Hinder; Papa Roach; Saving Abel |
| August 29, 2009 | George | United States | The Gorge Amphitheatre | Hinder; Papa Roach; Saving Abel |
| August 31, 2009 | Wheatland | United States | Sleep Train Amphitheatre | Hinder; Papa Roach; Saving Abel |
| September 1, 2009 | Mountain View | United States | Shoreline Amphitheatre | Hinder; Papa Roach; Saving Abel |
| September 3, 2009 | Irvine | United States | Verizon Wireless Amphitheatre | Hinder; Papa Roach; Saving Abel |
| September 4, 2009 | Las Vegas | United States | MGM Grand Garden Arena | Hinder; Papa Roach; Saving Abel |
| September 5, 2009 | Chula Vista | United States | Cricket Wireless Amphitheatre | Hinder; Papa Roach; Saving Abel |
| September 6, 2009 | Paradise | United States | MGM Grand Garden Arena | Hinder; Papa Roach; Saving Abel |
| September 8, 2009 | Glendale | United States | Jobing.com Arena | Hinder; Papa Roach; Saving Abel |
| September 9, 2009 | Albuquerque | United States | Journal Pavilion | Hinder; Papa Roach; Saving Abel |
| September 12, 2009 | The Woodlands | United States | Cynthia Woods Mitchell Pavilion | Hinder; Papa Roach; Saving Abel |
Leg 4 — Oceania
| November 7, 2009 | Auckland | New Zealand | Vector Arena | Sick Puppies |
| November 11, 2009 | Brisbane | Australia | Brisbane Entertainment Centre | Sick Puppies |
| November 13, 2009 | Sydney | Australia | Acer Arena | Sick Puppies |
| November 14, 2009 | Sydney | Australia | Acer Arena | Sick Puppies |
| November 16, 2009 | Melbourne | Australia | Rod Laver Arena | Sick Puppies |
| November 17, 2009 | Melbourne | Australia | Rod Laver Arena | Sick Puppies |
| November 19, 2009 | Adelaide | Australia | Adelaide Entertainment Centre | Sick Puppies |
| November 21, 2009 | Perth | Australia | Burswood Dome | Sick Puppies |
Leg 5 — Asia
| November 23, 2009 | Tokyo | Japan | Shinkiba Studio Coast | —N/a |
| November 25, 2009 | Tokyo | Japan | Shinkiba Studio Coast | —N/a |
Leg 6 — Europe
| January 17, 2010 | Liverpool | England | Echo Arena | Daughtry |
| January 19, 2010 | London | England | Wembley Arena | Daughtry |
| January 21, 2010 | Basel | Switzerland | St. Jakobshalle | Daughtry |
| January 24, 2010 | Linz | Austria | Intersport Arena | Daughtry |
| January 26, 2010 | Mannheim | Germany | SAP Arena | Daughtry |
| January 27, 2010 | Esch-sur-Alzette | Luxembourg | Rockhal | Daughtry |
| January 29, 2010 | Oberhausen | Germany | König Pilsener Arena | Daughtry |
| January 30, 2010 | Munich | Germany | Olympiahalle | Daughtry |
| February 1, 2010 | Hamburg | Germany | Color Line Arena | Daughtry |
Leg 7–8 — North America
| April 3, 2010 | Atlantic City | United States | Boardwalk Hall | Shinedown; Breaking Benjamin; Sick Puppies |
| April 6, 2010 | London | Canada | John Labatt Centre | Shinedown; Breaking Benjamin; Sick Puppies |
| April 8, 2010 | Toronto | Canada | Air Canada Centre | Shinedown; Breaking Benjamin; Sick Puppies |
| April 9, 2010 | Montreal | Canada | Bell Centre | Shinedown; Breaking Benjamin; Sick Puppies |
| April 11, 2010 | Ottawa | Canada | Scotiabank Place | Shinedown; Breaking Benjamin; Sick Puppies |
| April 13, 2010 | Washington, D.C. | United States | Verizon Center | Shinedown; Breaking Benjamin; Sick Puppies |
| April 14, 2010 | Hampton | United States | Hampton Coliseum | Shinedown; Breaking Benjamin; Sick Puppies |
| April 16, 2010 | Greenville | United States | Bi-Lo Center | Shinedown; Breaking Benjamin; Sick Puppies |
| April 17, 2010 | Greensboro | United States | Greensboro Coliseum | Shinedown; Breaking Benjamin; Sick Puppies |
| April 19, 2010 | Orlando | United States | Amway Arena | Shinedown; Breaking Benjamin; Sick Puppies |
| April 21, 2010 | Atlanta | United States | Philips Arena | Shinedown; Breaking Benjamin; Sick Puppies |
| April 23, 2010 | St. Louis | United States | Scottrade Center | Shinedown; Breaking Benjamin; Sick Puppies |
| April 24, 2010 | Tulsa | United States | BOK Center | Shinedown; Breaking Benjamin; Sick Puppies |
| April 26, 2010 | Kansas City | United States | Sprint Center | Shinedown; Breaking Benjamin; Sick Puppies |
| May 5, 2010 | Spokane | United States | Spokane Arena | Shinedown; Breaking Benjamin; Sick Puppies |
| May 7, 2010 | Tacoma | United States | Tacoma Dome | Shinedown; Breaking Benjamin; Sick Puppies |
| May 8, 2010 | Portland | United States | Portland Memorial Coliseum | Shinedown; Breaking Benjamin; Sick Puppies |
| May 10, 2010 | Boise | United States | Idaho Center | Shinedown; Breaking Benjamin; Sick Puppies |
| May 14, 2010 | Wichita | United States | Intrust Bank Arena | Shinedown; Breaking Benjamin; Sick Puppies |
| May 15, 2010 | Dallas | United States | American Airlines Center | Shinedown; Breaking Benjamin; Sick Puppies |
| May 18, 2010 | Rosemont | United States | Allstate Arena | Shinedown; Breaking Benjamin; Sick Puppies |
| May 19, 2010 | Grand Rapids | United States | Van Andel Arena | Shinedown; Breaking Benjamin; Sick Puppies |
| May 21, 2010 | Milwaukee | United States | Bradley Center | Shinedown; Breaking Benjamin; Sick Puppies |
| May 22, 2010 | Noblesville | United States | Verizon Wireless Music Center | Shinedown; Breaking Benjamin; Sick Puppies |
| May 24, 2010 | Minneapolis | United States | Target Center | Shinedown; Breaking Benjamin; Sick Puppies |
| May 25, 2010 | Omaha | United States | Qwest Events Center | Shinedown; Breaking Benjamin; Sick Puppies |
| May 27, 2010 | Fargo | United States | Fargodome | Shinedown; Breaking Benjamin; Sick Puppies |
| May 29, 2010 | Saskatoon | Canada | Credit Union Centre | Shinedown; Breaking Benjamin; Sick Puppies |
| May 31, 2010 | Calgary | Canada | Pengrowth Saddledome | Shinedown; Breaking Benjamin; Sick Puppies |
| June 1, 2010 | Edmonton | Canada | Rexall Place | Shinedown; Breaking Benjamin; Sick Puppies |
| June 3, 2010 | Vancouver | Canada | General Motors Place | Shinedown; Breaking Benjamin; Sick Puppies |
| September 14, 2010 | Nashville | United States | Bridgestone Arena | Three Days Grace; Buckcherry |
| September 15, 2010 | Fort Wayne | United States | Allen County War Memorial Coliseum | Three Days Grace; Buckcherry |
| September 17, 2010 | Pittsburgh | United States | Consol Energy Center | Three Days Grace; Buckcherry |
| September 18, 2010 | Detroit | United States | Joe Louis Arena | Three Days Grace; Buckcherry |
| September 21, 2010 | Buffalo | United States | HSBC Arena | Three Days Grace; Buckcherry |
| September 22, 2010 | Albany | United States | Times Union Center | Three Days Grace; Buckcherry |
| September 24, 2010 | Mansfield | United States | Comcast Center for the Performing Arts | Three Days Grace; Buckcherry |
| September 25, 2010 | Hershey | United States | Hershey Park Stadium | Three Days Grace; Buckcherry |
| September 28, 2010 | Uncasville | United States | Mohegan Sun Arena | Three Days Grace; Buckcherry |
| September 29, 2010 | Newark | United States | Prudential Center | Three Days Grace; Buckcherry |
| October 1, 2010 | Columbus | United States | Nationwide Arena | Three Days Grace; Buckcherry |
| October 2, 2010 | Cleveland | United States | Quicken Loans Arena | Three Days Grace; Buckcherry |
| October 8, 2010 | Lexington | United States | Rupp Arena | Three Days Grace; Buckcherry |
| October 10, 2010 | Little Rock | United States | Verizon Arena | Three Days Grace; Buckcherry |
| October 12, 2010 | New Orleans | United States | New Orleans Arena | Three Days Grace; Buckcherry |
| October 15, 2010 | The Woodlands | United States | Cynthia Woods Mitchell Pavilion | Three Days Grace; Buckcherry |
| October 16, 2010 | Oklahoma City | United States | Ford Center | Three Days Grace; Buckcherry |
| October 18, 2010 | Denver | United States | Pepsi Center | Three Days Grace; Buckcherry |
| October 20, 2010 | Salt Lake City | United States | EnergySolutions Arena | Three Days Grace; Buckcherry |
| October 22, 2010 | Anaheim | United States | Honda Center | Three Days Grace; Buckcherry |
| October 23, 2010 | Sacramento | United States | ARCO Arena | Three Days Grace; Buckcherry |
| October 26, 2010 | Concord | United States | Sleep Train Pavilion | Three Days Grace; Buckcherry |
| October 27, 2010 | Fresno | United States | Save Mart Center | Three Days Grace; Buckcherry |
| October 29, 2010 | Phoenix | United States | Cricket Wireless Pavilion | Three Days Grace; Buckcherry |
| October 30, 2010 | Paradise | United States | MGM Grand Garden Arena | Three Days Grace; Buckcherry |

=== Box office score data ===
| Venue | City | No. of shows / No. of sellouts | Tickets sold / available | Gross revenue |
|---|---|---|---|---|
| Sommet Center | Nashville | 1 / 1 | 13,754 / 13,754 (100%) | $783,757 |
| Rupp Arena | Lexington | 1 / 1 | 17,227 / 17,227 (100%) | $957,951 |
| Joe Louis Arena | Detroit | 1 / 1 | 17,030 / 17,030 (100%) | $948,719 |
| Air Canada Centre | Toronto | 1 / 1 | 14,261 / 14,261 (100%) | $890,403 |
| Copps Coliseum | Hamilton | 1 / 1 | 11,554 / 11,554 (100%) | $680,003 |
| DCU Center | Worcester | 1 / 1 | 12,116 / 12,116 (100%) | $740,210 |
| Izod Center | East Rutheford | 1 / 1 | 16,035 / 16,035 (100%) | $894,713 |
| Mohegan Sun Arena | Uncasville | 1 / 1 | 7,701 / 7,701 (100%) | $466,800 |
| Wachovia Center | Philadelphia | 1 / 1 | 13,201 / 13,201 (100%) | $858,993 |
| Nationwide Arena | Columbus | 1 / 1 | 14,075 / 14,075 (100%) | $774,398 |
| Allstate Arena | Rosemont | 1 / 1 | 14,141 / 14,141 (100%) | $879,944 |
| Bradley Center | Milwaukee | 1 / 1 | 15,129 / 15,129 (100%) | $809,323 |
| i wireless Center | Moline | 1 / 1 | 10,877 / 10,877 (100%) | $618,238 |
| Qwest Center | Omaha | 1 / 1 | 15,369 / 15,369 (100%) | $843,612 |
| Wells Fargo Arena | Des Moines | 1 / 1 | 12,046 / 12,046 (100%) | $617,306 |
| Target Center | Minneapolis | 1 / 1 | 14,075 / 14,075 (100%) | $824,875 |
| Darien Lake Performing Arts Center | Darien | 1 / 1 | 21,752 / 21,752 (100%) | $824,002 |
| Susquehanna Bank Center | Camden | 1 / 0 | 14,437 / 25,317 (59%) | 518,575 |
| Toyota Pavilion at Montage Mountain | Scranton | 1 / 1 | 16,958 / 16,958 (100%) | $549,210 |
| Nikon at Jones Beach Theater | Wantagh | 1 / 0 | 13,424 / 13,810 (97%) | $608,027 |
| Post-Gazette Pavilion at Star Lake | Burgettstown | 1 / 0 | 21,079 / 23,145 (93%) | $742,158 |
| Hershey Park Stadium | Hershey | 1 / 1 | 19,460 / 19,460 (100%) | $1,050,558 |
| PNC Bank Arts Center | Holmdel | 1 / 0 | 16,208 / 16,914 (96%) | $609,897 |
| Saratoga Performing Arts Center | Saratoga Springs | 1 / 0 | 18,632 / 25,228 (75%) | $676,732 |
| Total | | 24 / 19 | 360,541 / 381,175 (93%) | $18,168,404 |

== Personnel ==
- Chad Kroeger – lead vocals, guitar
- Ryan Peake – guitar, backing vocals
- Mike Kroeger – bass
- Daniel Adair – drums, backing vocals
