= Burn It to the Ground =

Single by Nickelback

from the album Dark Horse
- Released: May 2009
- Recorded: March–July 2008
- Studio: Mountain View Studios (Abbotsford, British Columbia)
- Genre: Alternative metal; stoner rock
- Length: 3:31
- Label: Roadrunner
- Songwriters: Chad Kroeger; Mike Kroeger; Joey Moi
- Producers: Robert John "Mutt" Lange; Nickelback; Joey Moi

Nickelback singles chronology
"I'd Come for You" (2009)	"Burn It to the Ground" (2009)	"Never Gonna Be Alone" (2009)

Music video
- "Burn It to the Ground" on YouTube

"Burn It to the Ground" is the fourth U.S. single (fifth single in Canada after "I'd Come for You") released in May 2009 from the Canadian rock band Nickelback's sixth studio album Dark Horse (2008). The song has been used extensively for various promotional uses, in television, film and mainly sports-related promos.

== Background and composition ==
Frontman Chad Kroeger describes the song as being about drinking "everything in sight". The song is an arena anthem, and was a live staple of the band's Dark Horse Tour. Kroeger usually began the song by stating "this song is the theme song of my life".

Sheet music for the song shows it in 4/4 time with a rollicking triplet feel established by the drums and guitars, paced moderately at 124 beats per minute. The key is D major, while the vocal range is A_{4} to D_{6}.

== Reception ==
"Burn It to the Ground" was released to US radio in May 2009. It first charted on May 23 on the Heritage Rock chart, and on May 30, it entered the Active Rock chart, beginning a chart run of 24 weeks. It peaked at number three on the Active Rock chart in September. The song was nominated for Best Hard Rock Performance for the 52nd Grammy Awards, but lost to AC/DC.

On February 28, 2010, Nickelback performed the song at the closing ceremony of the 2010 Winter Olympics in Vancouver. The performance helped the song to reach number two on Canada's iTunes while the album reached also number two in the top albums category almost a year and a half after its release.

"Burn It to the Ground" became the highest-charting single by Nickelback in Finland and only the second Nickelback single to enter the Finnish Singles Chart, peaking at number seven. Their first entry was "How You Remind Me", which was released eight years earlier (the song peaked at number 18).

== Music video ==
The video premiered on July 10, 2009. The video features the band on stage at the O_{2} Arena in London performing the song. The crowd shots are a mix of all of their Dark Horse Tour shows in the United Kingdom.

== Live performances ==
Nickelback played the song on Jimmy Kimmel Live! with "When We Stand Together" in 2011. In December 2011, they performed the song as part of the 2011 WWE Tribute to the Troops.

== Use in media ==
It is featured on the soundtrack for Transformers: Revenge of the Fallen, and can be heard in the background during a party scene in the film. An instrumental version of the song was played when the Kansas City Royals' starting line-up was introduced during home games in 2009. The song was also used by the 2009 Colorado Rockies, and 2010 Baltimore Orioles as the players took the field. The song is also featured in video game NHL 10, and was used as the theme song for WWE Monday Night Raw from November 16, 2009, until July 16, 2012, and was used in late 2017 for promoting Raw 25, the show's 25th anniversary episode for January 22, 2018. It was also featured in Jersey Shore's second season.

The song was featured for Norfolk Southern Railway 21st Century Steam Program, starting in 2014 and running until 2017.

The song is also the touchdown song for the NFL's Cincinnati Bengals and Dallas Cowboys, the goal song for the NHL's New York Islanders and Tampa Bay Lightning (the latter during the 2026 Stadium Series) and the AHL's Peoria Rivermen and the GOJHL's LaSalle Vipers, the start of the song plays before the opening faceoff for the Chicago Blackhawks and also the entrance theme for the AHL's Abbotsford Heat and was the entrance theme of Jonny Gomes of the Cincinnati Reds.

The song is also featured in the trailer for the 2010 film Date Night, it was also used for the presenter entrance for the Top Gear Live show. The song has also been used sporadically for the WHL's Kelowna Rockets and the SJHL's Flin Flon Bombers. An instrumental version of the song is used whenever the Boston Blazers have a Power Play opportunity. The song is also played in Speed Channel's ad for NASCAR Sprint All-Star Race XXVI.

It was also used in the Formula One highlights for the 2010 Australian Grand Prix, as well as for the 2010 NASCAR commercials.

The instrumental version of the song was used to introduce the players of Team Staal led by Eric Staal at the 2011 NHL All-Star Game.

The song was featured as a playable track part of the Nickelback downloadable track pack for the video game Rock Band.

The song debuted on August 14, 2010 as the new introduction song for the Seattle Seahawks.

== Track listing ==
1. "Clean Edit" – 3:29
2. "Album Version" – 3:30

== Charts ==
=== Weekly charts ===
Chart (2009)	Peak position
Canada Hot 100 (Billboard)	37
Canada Rock (Billboard)	5
Finland (Suomen virallinen lista)	7
Germany (GfK)	65
UK Rock & Metal (Official Charts)	17
US Bubbling Under Hot 100 (Billboard)	8
US Alternative Airplay (Billboard)	32
US Mainstream Rock Airplay (Billboard)	3
US Hot Rock & Alternative Songs (Billboard)	7

=== Year-end charts ===
Chart (2009)	Position
US Hot Rock Songs (Billboard)	27

== Certifications ==
Region	Certification	Certified units/sales
Canada (Music Canada)	8× Platinum	640,000^{‡}
Denmark (IFPI Danmark)	Gold	45,000^{‡}
New Zealand (RMNZ)	2× Platinum	60,000^{‡}
United Kingdom (BPI)	Platinum	600,000^{‡}
United States (RIAA)	2× Platinum	2,000,000^{‡}
^{‡} Sales+streaming figures based on certification alone.
