= Shakin' Hands =

Single by Nickelback

from the album Dark Horse
- Released: November 16, 2009 (U.S. radio)
- Recorded: March–July 2008
- Studio: Mountain View (Abbotsford, British Columbia)
- Genre: Hard rock; alternative metal
- Length: 3:39
- Label: Roadrunner
- Songwriters: Robert John "Mutt" Lange; Chad Kroeger; Joey Moi
- Producer: Robert John "Mutt" Lange

Nickelback singles chronology
"Never Gonna Be Alone" (2009)	"Shakin' Hands" (2009)	"This Afternoon" (2010)

"Shakin' Hands" is a promotional single by Nickelback off their sixth studio album, Dark Horse, released on November 16, 2009, as the second U.S. rock radio-only single (seventh single overall).

== Chart performance ==
The song charted at No. 49 on the Canadian Hot 100 before eventually being released as a single. It later re-entered at No. 92. The song charted at No. 11 on the Billboard Mainstream Rock chart and No. 24 on the Billboard Rock Songs chart.

== Track listing ==
1. "Shakin' Hands" (album version)
2. "Shakin' Hands" (radio edit)

== Charts ==
Chart (2008–2010)	Peak position
Canada Hot 100 (Billboard)	49
Canada Rock (Billboard)	3
US Hot Rock & Alternative Songs (Billboard)	24
US Mainstream Rock (Billboard)	11

== Certifications ==
Region	Certification	Certified units/sales
Canada (Music Canada)	Gold	40,000^{‡}
^{‡} Sales+streaming figures based on certification alone.
