= Dark Horse (Nickelback album) =

Studio album by Nickelback
- Released: November 19, 2008
- Recorded: March–July 2008
- Studio: Mountain View Studios (Abbotsford, British Columbia)
- Genres: Post-grunge; hard rock; alternative rock; alternative metal
- Length: 43:36
- Labels: Roadrunner; EMI
- Producers: Robert John "Mutt" Lange; Nickelback; Joey Moi

Nickelback chronology
All the Right Reasons (2005)	Dark Horse (2008)	Here and Now (2011)

Singles from Dark Horse
- 1. "Gotta Be Somebody" Released: September 29, 2008; 2. "Something in Your Mouth" Released: October 28, 2008; 3. "If Today Was Your Last Day" Released: November 11, 2008; 4. "I'd Come for You" Released: April 4, 2009; 5. "Burn It to the Ground" Released: May 17, 2009; 6. "Never Gonna Be Alone" Released: September 29, 2009; 7. "Shakin' Hands" Released: November 16, 2009; 8. "This Afternoon" Released: March 23, 2010

Dark Horse is the sixth studio album by the Canadian rock band Nickelback, released on November 19, 2008. It is the follow-up to their Diamond-certified All the Right Reasons (2005). It was co-produced by the band and producer and songwriter Robert John "Mutt" Lange, known for working with such acts as Foreigner, AC/DC, Bryan Adams, Def Leppard and Shania Twain. Dark Horse sold 326,000 in its first week and debuted at number two in the US. More than a year after its release, the album did not leave the top 100 on the Billboard 200. In its 91st week, the album peaked at number 46 for the week of August 28, 2010. The album spent 125 consecutive weeks inside the Billboard 200.

It was ranked at number 191 on Billboard's 200 Albums of the Decade. It is also the band's fourth straight multi-Platinum selling album in the United States. As of 2010, the album has sold three million copies in the United States and five million copies worldwide.

== Promotion and singles ==
The first single from the album was "Gotta Be Somebody", which was released online for free digital download on September 29, 2008, for a strict 24-hour period. "If Today Was Your Last Day" had been planned as the lead single but was scrapped at the last minute. The track "Something in Your Mouth" became available for download from the United States iTunes Store on October 28, and was released to US rock radio airplay as the second single from the album on December 15. The song was a hit in 2009 in many countries, such as the United States. In Australia, it received little airplay.

In January 2009, the album's second mainstream single (third overall) was released: "I'd Come for You", with Nigel Dick having made the music video. Songs "Something in Your Mouth" and "Burn It to the Ground", written by Kroeger, were released only to the rock radio stations in December 2008 and May 2009 respectively.

The exclusive Walmart edition of Dark Horse included a link to download an MP3 from Nickelback's performance of "This Afternoon" on Walmart Soundcheck.

The album won numerous accolades at the 2009 Juno Awards, winning three out of five of its nominated awards including "Rock Album of the Year".

Dark Horse was certified Platinum by the Recording Industry Association of America (RIAA) on December 9, 2008, only three weeks after its North American release. The album also remained in the top 20 on the Billboard 200 for weeks after its release. The album was certified 2× Platinum in April 2009, and had by April 2010 sold over three million copies in the US. "Burn It to the Ground" was also nominated for Best Hard Rock Performance at the 52nd Grammy Awards but lost to AC/DC's "War Machine".

On September 13, 2010, the album re-entered the German Albums Chart at number 30, 21 months after its debut and almost six months after its last entry on that chart.

== Music and lyrics ==
Lyrically, Dark Horse has been characterized as "a slice of perceptive, precise self-examination". Some of the subject matter is considered to be vulgar, and by the assessment of some critics, misogynistic. Themes explored include binge drinking, recreational drug use, prostitutes, adult film actresses, and exotic dancers.

Some of Dark Horse's guitar riffs have been described as "knuckle-dragging". The album's production has been described as "caught somewhere between the two extremes of AC/DC and Def Leppard". The album incorporates drum loops on some tracks.

The album contains elements of honkey-tonk music, namely in the track "This Afternoon".

== Critical reception ==
Professional ratings
Aggregate scores
Source	Rating
Metacritic	49/100
Review scores
Source	Rating
AllMusic	1.5/5 stars
Blender	3.5/5 stars
Consequence of Sound	1/5 stars
Entertainment Weekly	C+
The Guardian	1/5 stars
Los Angeles Times	2/4 stars
Mojo	3/5 stars
PopMatters	3/10
Rolling Stone	3.5/5 stars
Sputnikmusic	2.5/5

According to Metacritic, the album received mixed reviews from critics, scoring 49 out of 100. Conversely, it received the Juno Award for Album of the Year, a category whose nominees are the top five selling Canadian releases of the year.

Stephen Thomas Erlewine of AllMusic gave Dark Horse 1.5/5, writing, "Dark Horse is constructed entirely from the group's standard power ballad and hard rock templates, the mood only lightening when Kroeger and company take a break to kick back on 'This Afternoon'".

Entertainment Weekly reviewer Leah Greenblatt wrote, "It's hard not to be put off by the execrable lyrics of album opener "Something in Your Mouth" (the song is basically kryptonite for feminists)". PopMatters criticised the band's release, giving it 3/10 and saying it was a step down from previous albums: "Dark Horse finds the group at a creative low point. Each song sounds like an older, better Nickelback hit, and Kroeger only once displays his prior songwriting strength with the sad-bastard portrait 'Just to Get High'". The Guardian awarded the album one out of five stars, being particularly negative of the band's cliché style; "Nickelback's music reaffirms every sex-and-stupidity cliche hard rock can offer". In congruence, Consequence of Sound gave the album one star out of five in a scathing review. Staff writer David Buchanan assessed: "The problem is that while Nickelback's front man tries so hard to convert us to perversion, it feels less like Matthew McConaughey hitting on you and more like those creepy old men at your local burger joint. Chad Kroeger might be blond now, but he still sounds like a sex-crazed 40-something with a soft side".

Rolling Stone gave the album a positive review, complimenting its production, writing "Mutt Lange lightens Nickelback's dreary post-grunge plod, applying guitar shimmer to prom ballads and detonating big beats under frat-party shouts and raplike vocal parts". Whilst ChartAttack credited the band's success to knowing its target audience: "Chad Kroeger is a genius because he knows exactly what people want and precisely how far he can go. He turned out an extremely racy album that's loaded with songs about gettin' drunk and doin' it all without breaking any taboos, and with enough love and moral authority to grease its passage into the mainstream. Rejoice, North America. This is your world". Billboard also praised the album's content: "The bulletproof Nickelback provides affordable fun that promises good returns in hard times".

== Track listing ==
All lyrics are written by Chad Kroeger; all music is composed by Nickelback with Robert John "Mutt" Lange on tracks 1, 4, 7, 8 and 11 and Joey Moi on tracks 1, 2 and 8.

No.	Title	Length
1.	"Something in Your Mouth"	3:39
2.	"Burn It to the Ground"	3:32
3.	"Gotta Be Somebody"	4:12
4.	"I'd Come for You"	4:22
5.	"Next Go Round"	3:43
6.	"Just to Get High"	4:02
7.	"Never Gonna Be Alone"	3:47
8.	"Shakin' Hands"	3:39
9.	"S.E.X."	3:53
10.	"If Today Was Your Last Day"	4:09
11.	"This Afternoon"	4:33
Total length:		43:36

Walmart exclusive digital download bonus track

12. "This Afternoon" (Original Performance Series) – 4:26

Australian singles

1. "Gotta Be Somebody"
2. "I'd Come for You"
3. "If Today Was Your Last Day"
4. "Never Gonna Be Alone"
5. "Burn It to the Ground"
6. "This Afternoon"

== Personnel ==
Nickelback

- Chad Kroeger – lead vocals, lead guitar, rhythm guitar on "If Today Was Your Last Day"
- Ryan Peake – rhythm guitar, backing vocals, lead guitar on "If Today Was Your Last Day"
- Mike Kroeger – bass
- Daniel Adair – drums, backing vocals

Production

- Mutt Lange – production
- Joey Moi – production, mixing on "Gotta Be Somebody", "Never Gonna Be Alone" and "This Afternoon"
- Randy Staub – mixing
- Zach Blackstone – mixing assistance
- Chris Lord-Alge – mixing on "I'd Come for You"
- Nik Karpen – mixing assistance on "I'd Come for You"
- Keith Armstrong – mixing assistance on "I'd Come for You"
- Mike Shipley – mixing on "If Today Was Your Last Day"
- Brian Wohlgemuth – mixing assistance on "If Today Was Your Last Day"
- Ted Jensen – mastering
- Olle Romo – editing, additional engineering
- Scott Cooke – editing, additional engineering

== Charts ==
=== Weekly charts ===
Chart (2008)	Peak position
Australian Albums (ARIA)	3
Austrian Albums (Ö3 Austria)	5
Belgian Albums (Ultratop Flanders)	35
Canadian Albums (Billboard)	1
Danish Albums (Hitlisten)	37
Dutch Albums (Album Top 100)	25
Finnish Albums (Suomen virallinen lista)	19
French Albums (SNEP)	112
German Albums (Offizielle Top 100)	4
Irish Albums (IRMA)	19
Italian Albums (FIMI)	31
Japanese Albums (Oricon)	17
New Zealand Albums (RMNZ)	3
Russian Albums (2M)	9
Scottish Albums (Official Charts)	8
South African Albums (RISA)	16
Swedish Albums (Sverigetopplistan)	9
Swiss Albums (Schweizer Hitparade)	5
UK Albums (Official Charts)	4
UK Rock & Metal Albums (Official Charts)	1
US Billboard 200	2
US Top Alternative Albums (Billboard)	1
US Top Hard Rock Albums (Billboard)	1
US Top Rock Albums (Billboard)	1

=== Year-end charts ===
Chart (2008)	Position
Australian Albums (ARIA)	15
New Zealand Albums (RMNZ)	42
Swedish Albums (Sverigetopplistan)	72
Swiss Albums (Schweizer Hitparade)	52
UK Albums (OCC)	88

Chart (2009)	Position
Australian Albums (ARIA)	16
Canadian Albums (Billboard)	1
German Albums (Offizielle Top 100)	98
Swiss Albums (Schweizer Hitparade)	64
UK Albums (OCC)	114
US Billboard 200	3
US Top Rock Albums (Billboard)	1

Chart (2010)	Position
Australian Albums (ARIA)	76
Canadian Albums (Billboard)	49
US Billboard 200	42
US Top Rock Albums (Billboard)	6

=== Decade-end charts ===
Chart (2000–2009)	Position
US Billboard 200	191

== Certifications ==
Region	Certification	Certified units/sales
Australia (ARIA)	3× Platinum	210,000^{^}
Austria (IFPI Austria)	Gold	10,000^{*}
Canada (Music Canada)	9× Platinum	720,000^{‡}
Denmark (IFPI Danmark)	Platinum	20,000^{‡}
Germany (BVMI)	3× Gold	300,000^{‡}
GCC (IFPI Middle East)	Platinum	6,000^{*}
New Zealand (RMNZ)	2× Platinum	30,000^{‡}
Sweden (GLF)	Gold	20,000^{^}
United Kingdom (BPI)	Platinum	300,000^{*}
United States (RIAA)	3× Platinum	3,000,000^{^}
^{*} Sales figures based on certification alone.^{^} Shipments figures based on certification alone.^{‡} Sales+streaming figures based on certification alone.

== Release history ==
Region	Date	Label	Catalogue
Australia	November 15, 2008	Warner	RR 8028–2
Europe	November 17, 2008	Warner	RR 8028–2
United States	November 18, 2008	Roadrunner	RR 8028–2
Canada	November 18, 2008	EMI	RR 8028–2

== Appearances ==
- The song "Something in Your Mouth" was featured in the film American Pie Presents: The Book of Love in 2009.
- The song "Burn It to the Ground" was featured in the movie Transformers: Revenge of the Fallen and on film's album in 2009, in the video games NHL 10 in 2009 and WWE SmackDown vs. Raw 2011 in 2010, and in a trailer for the movie Date Night in 2010. Both it and "This Afternoon" were featured as downloadable content for the video game Rock Band in 2010, while "If Today Was Your Last Day" was later included in 2011. Nickelback themselves even performed it during the closing ceremony for the 2010 Winter Olympics in Vancouver.
