= Nickelback =

Canadian rock band

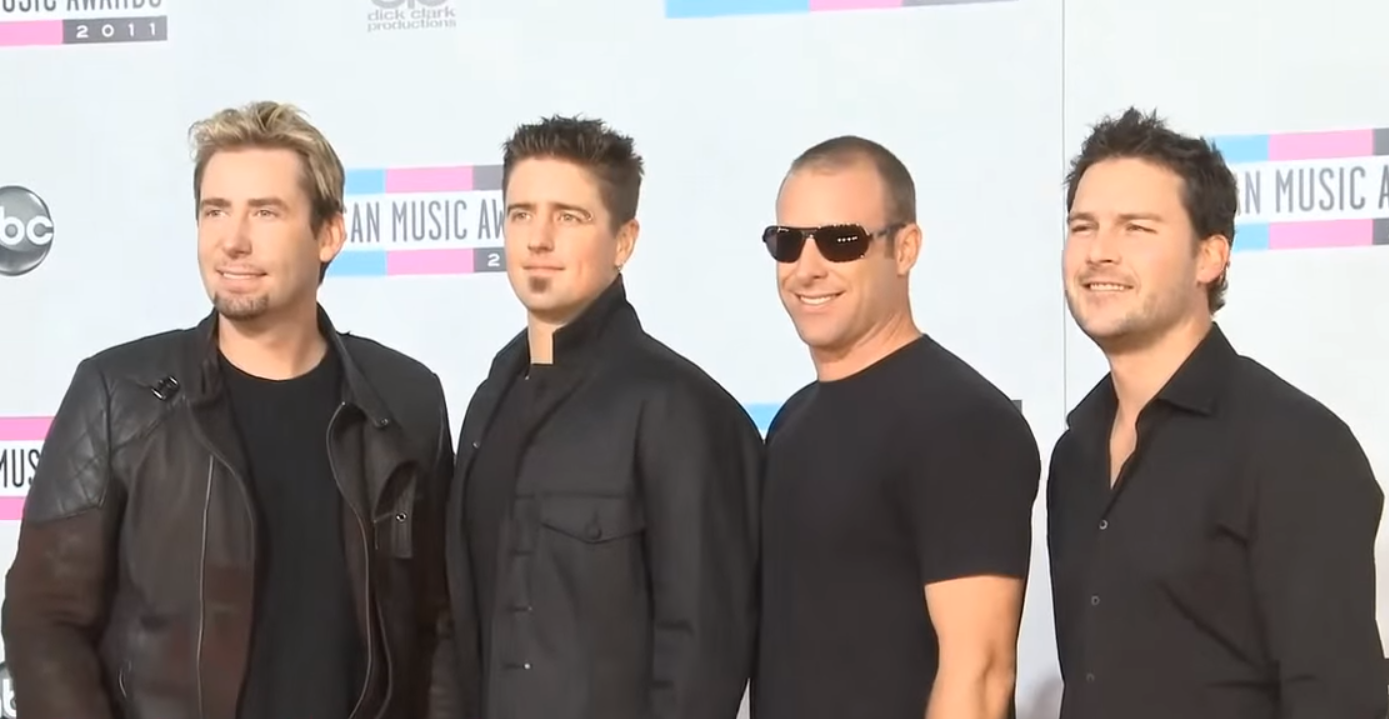
- Nickelback in 2011; Left to Right: Chad Kroeger, Daniel Adair, Mike Kroeger, Ryan Peake

Background information
- Origin: Hanna, Alberta, Canada
- Genres: Post-grunge; hard rock; alternative rock; alternative metal; pop rock
- Years active: 1995–present
- Labels: EMI Canada; Roadrunner; Atlantic; LiveNation; Universal Music Canada; Republic; BMG; Nickelback II Productions, Inc.
- Members: Chad Kroeger; Ryan Peake; Mike Kroeger; Daniel Adair
- Past members: Brandon Kroeger; Mitch Guindon; Ryan Vikedal
- Website: nickelback.com
- Logo

Nickelback is a Canadian rock band formed in 1995 in Hanna, Alberta, comprising lead guitarist and lead vocalist Chad Kroeger, rhythm guitarist, keyboardist and backing vocalist Ryan Peake, and bassist Mike Kroeger. It went through several drummer changes between 1995 and 2005 before Daniel Adair joined.

The band signed with Roadrunner Records in 1999 and reached a mainstream breakthrough in 2002 with the single "How You Remind Me", which reached number one in the United States and Canada. Its parent album, Silver Side Up, was certified eight-times platinum in Canada. Nickelback's fourth album, The Long Road (2003), produced five singles, including "Someday", which reached number one in Canada and number seven on the US Billboard Hot 100.

In 2005, Nickelback's best-selling album, All the Right Reasons, produced three top-10 and five top-20 singles on the Billboard Hot 100, including "Photograph", "Far Away", and "Rockstar", the latter of which was their biggest success in the United Kingdom. Nickelback released eight singles from their sixth album Dark Horse (2008), including the United States top-10 track "Gotta Be Somebody". In 2011, the album Here and Now topped the charts in Canada. It was followed by No Fixed Address (2014), Feed the Machine (2017) and Get Rollin' (2022).

Nickelback is one of the most successful Canadian rock bands, having sold more than 50 million albums worldwide. In 2009, Billboard ranked it the most successful rock group and the seventh-most successful artist of that decade; "How You Remind Me" was the best-selling rock song and the fourth-best overall. In 2023, Nickelback were inducted into the Canadian Music Hall of Fame.

== History ==
=== Formation (1995) ===
The band was formed in the early 1990s as a cover band called Village Idiot by brothers Mike and Chad Kroeger. Their cousin Brandon Kroeger and Ryan Peake rounded out the band. The band later changed its name to Nickelback, which originated from the nickel in change that band member Mike Kroeger gave customers at his job at Starbucks; he would frequently say, "Here's your nickel back." The band performed covers of songs from Led Zeppelin and Metallica. Chad Kroeger then asked his step-father to loan him CA$4,000 so that the band could record their first demo, a seven-track extended play (EP) of original material, called Hesher (1996). The band spent half the money to record the EP, while Kroeger spent the other half on magic mushrooms to resell.

=== Curb and The State (1996–2000) ===
In 1996, the band recorded and released their first full-length album, Curb. "Fly" was included on both Hesher and Curb and was the first single produced by Nickelback. In 1997, Brandon Kroeger left the band and was replaced by Mitch Guindon; however, Guindon soon departed as well. While initially reported due to him starting work at a car company, Guindon's departure came due to him "not [being] meant for the road". Chad Kroeger stated that his skin was not able to handle cold weather and they convinced him to leave. In Summer 1998, Ryan Vikedal joined the band.

Roadrunner A&R Ron Burman told HitQuarters that one of his West Coast scouts sent him the self-released album and, suitably impressed, he travelled to Vancouver to see them perform live. Although an unknown property in the industry at the time, the venue was packed out. In Burman's words: "I immediately got the chills! I thought their song 'Leader of Men' was a smash hit." Off the stage he was impressed by their industry and initiative in managing their career. Despite this, it still took Burman three months for him to convince his label bosses to approve the signing, a decision that would mark Roadrunner's first move into mainstream rock. Nickelback signed a record deal with EMI and Roadrunner Records in 1999.

The State was released by Nickelback in 2000 by Roadrunner Records and EMI Canada, followed by its release in Europe in 2001. It spawned four singles: "Old Enough", "Worthy to Say", "Leader of Men" and "Breathe", the last two being Top 10 rock hits. The album was the band's first album to be certified gold status and it later went into platinum status in 2008, after the success of their later albums. The album entered the Billboard 200 at number 130 and peaked at number 3 in the Billboard Top Heatseekers albums chart and peaked at number 6 on the Billboard Top Independent albums chart.

=== Silver Side Up and The Long Road (2001–2004) ===
Around 2001, Chad Kroeger started "studying every piece, everything sonically, everything lyrically, everything musically, chord structure. I would dissect every single song that I would hear on the radio or every song that had ever done well on a chart and I would say, 'Why did this do well?'" Kroeger said that Nickelback's single "How You Remind Me" sold so well because it was about romantic relationships, a universal subject, and contained memorable hooks.

"How You Remind Me"
Nickelback's "How You Remind Me" from Silver Side Up

To record their third album Silver Side Up, Nickelback collaborated with producer Rick Parashar. The album was written before the release of The State and was recorded at the same studio. The album was released on Tuesday, September 11, 2001. The album peaked at number two on the Billboard 200 with over 177,000 copies sold in its first week and peaked at number one at the Canadian albums chart, making it the band's first album to do so. The single "How You Remind Me" was a number one single on the Mainstream and Modern rock charts, as well as the pop chart. It also peaked at number two on Adult Top 40 and became the Billboard Hot 100 number one single of the year for 2002. The next single was "Too Bad", which also reached number one on the Mainstream Rock Chart. The final single from the album was "Never Again", which also hit number one on Mainstream Rock.

In 2002, Chad Kroeger collaborated with Josey Scott on the Spider-Man theme song, "Hero". This recording also featured Tyler Connolly, Mike Kroeger, Matt Cameron, and Jeremy Taggart. In 2002, Nickelback released their first DVD Live at Home.

On August 19, 2002, an incident occurred while the band was performing at the Ilha do Ermal festival in Portugal. While performing the second song of their set, Chad Kroeger was sprayed with a full bottle of water hurled from somewhere within the audience. After finishing the song, Chad asked the crowd, "Do you want to hear some rock 'n' roll or do you want to go home?" A person in the audience then threw a rock at Chad's head. The band then left stage, with Chad and Vikedal giving the finger to the audience as they left. The band's label, Roadrunner, posted video footage of the entire incident on their website.

In 2003, Nickelback released The Long Road. The album was certified 3× Platinum by the RIAA in March 2005 and it had sold 3,591,000 copies as of April 2011. It has sold over 5 million copies worldwide and, in 2003 alone, the album sold 2 million copies worldwide. It debuted at No. 6 on the Billboard 200. This was their first album produced by Joey Moi, a former classmate of the band's.

The Long Road was ranked No. 157 on Billboard's 200 Albums of the Decade. It spawned five singles. The lead single was "Someday". The band also released "Feelin' Way Too Damn Good" as a single, which peaked at number three on the Mainstream Rock Charts. "Figured You Out" was also released as a single and topped the Mainstream Rock Charts for 13 consecutive weeks.

=== All the Right Reasons (2005–2007) ===
After wrapping up the band's tour in support of The Long Road on New Year's Day 2005, drummer Ryan Vikedal was fired after a royalty dispute. He was later replaced by 3 Doors Down's drummer Daniel Adair. Kroeger later sued Vikedal to prevent him receiving any further royalties from Nickelback's music, though the lawsuit was later settled out of court for an undisclosed amount. Nickelback promptly went into the studio with their new drummer from January through May 2005. The sessions resulted in their fifth studio album, All the Right Reasons which was released on October 3, 2005. It peaked at number one on the Billboard 200 with 323,350 copies in its first week in the United States, as well as producing five U.S. Hot 100 top 20 singles: "Photograph", "Savin' Me", "Far Away", "If Everyone Cared" and "Rockstar". Three of these became U.S. Hot 100 top 10 singles. Also, the album peaked at number one on the Canadian albums chart. The album sold more than 12 million singles and over 9 million ringtones. The album also made Nickelback the first band in Nielsen BDS history to have five singles on the CHR charts. It included appearances by Billy Gibbons of ZZ Top, who played a guitar solo on the song "Follow You Home" and sang backing vocals on "Rockstar"—and a posthumously sampled appearance by Chad Kroeger's friend Dimebag Darrell from Pantera, culled from guitar outtakes. All the Right Reasons had sold over 7 million copies in the U.S. to June 19, 2010.

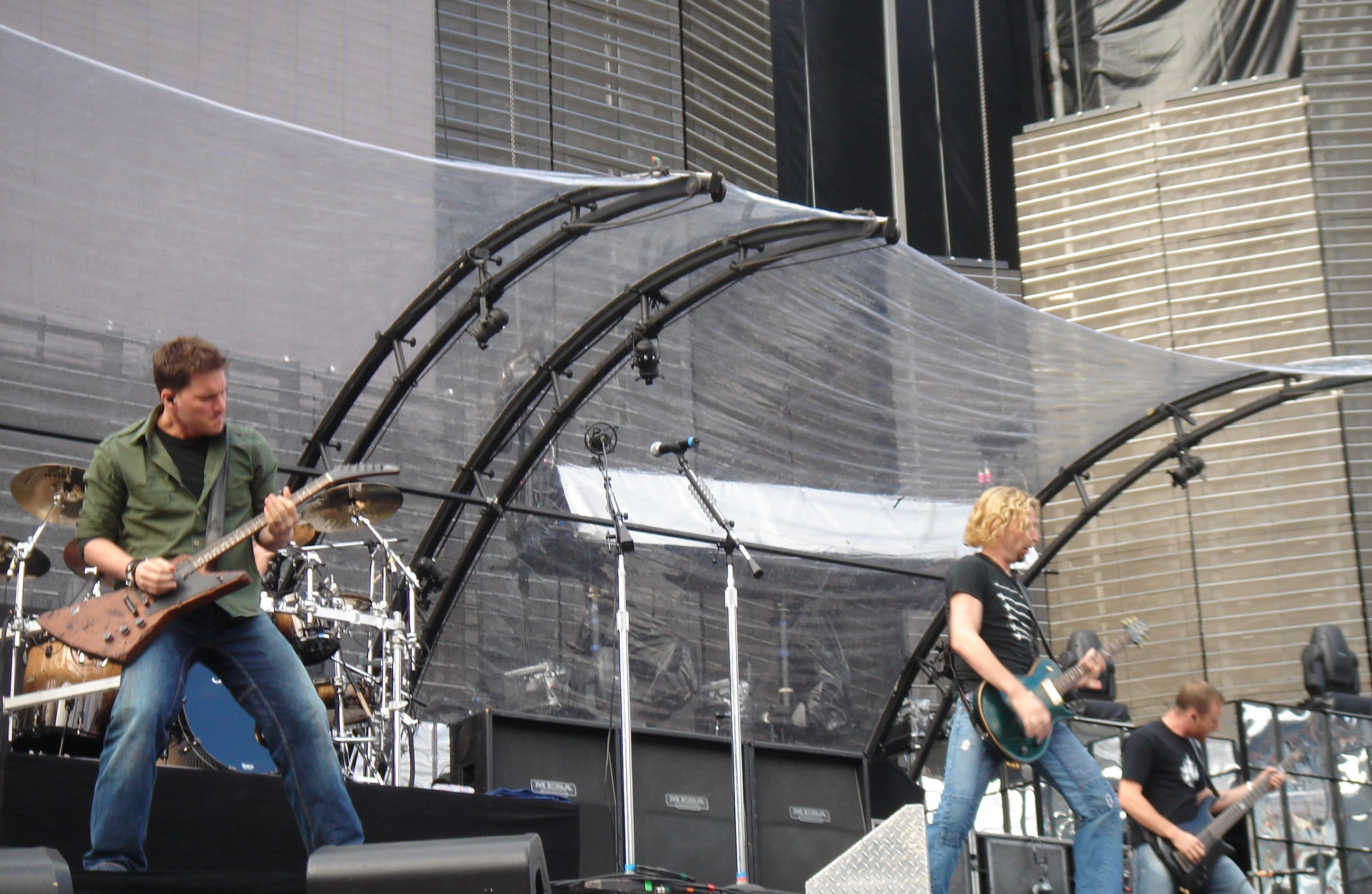
Nickelback in May 2006

The band spent much of 2006 and 2007 touring across the globe. In the fall of 2006, the band opened for Bon Jovi on the European leg of the Have a Nice Day Tour. Over 2 million fans attended Nickelback's shows during those two years.

The band played at Sturgis, South Dakota to over 35,000 people at the 2006 Sturgis Bike Rally. The performance was filmed with 15 high-definition cameras. They released the DVD and Blu-ray of it in 2009, several years after the performance. In November 2006, the band won an American Music Award for best pop/rock album, surprising the band itself. "We just kinda showed up because we were supposed to give one of these away tonight," Chad Kroeger said after receiving the award. He added that he had thought the Red Hot Chili Peppers would win the award.

=== Dark Horse (2008–2010) ===
After taking much of 2007 off, the band started recording a new album in earnest. In July 2008, the band signed with Live Nation for three touring and album cycles, with an option for a fourth. On September 4, 2008, it was announced that the first single from the upcoming album would be "If Today Was Your Last Day", to be released on September 30, 2008. This announcement was however never confirmed: Roadrunner Records actually chose to release another song, "Gotta Be Somebody", as the first single. It became Nickelback's fifth (and, so far, final) single to hit the No. 1 spot on the U.S. Adult Top 40 chart. The new album, produced by Mutt Lange and titled Dark Horse, was released on November 18, 2008. "Something in Your Mouth" was released as the second single to rock radio only on December 15, 2008, where it reached number one. "If Today Was Your Last Day" was eventually released as a single after all on March 31, 2009: it became the third single from the album. Four more singles were released later in 2009, "I'd Come for You", "Burn It to the Ground" and "Never Gonna Be Alone" released in September and "Shakin' Hands" as the seventh single on November 16. Its eighth single, "This Afternoon", was released on March 23, 2010. Dark Horse was certified platinum by the Recording Industry Association of America (RIAA) on December 9, 2008, only three weeks after its North American release. All eight singles were major hits which finished at or near the top of at least one high-profile chart.

On November 26, 2008, the band announced the tour for the support of the album. Live Nation produced the tour and the band kicked off in Nashville, Tennessee, with Seether, and Saving Abel as their opening acts. The band then announced that they were about to tour in the UK with Black Stone Cherry as their opening act. The band then announced the second leg of the tour of North America with the opening acts being Hinder, Papa Roach, and once again, Saving Abel. The band then went on tour around Australia and New Zealand with Sick Puppies as their supporting act. For the second leg of the Europe tour, the band played with their opening act Daughtry. The third leg of the North America tour kicked off with Breaking Benjamin, Sick Puppies and Shinedown opening up for the band. The band concluded their tour with the fourth leg in North America which included Buckcherry and Three Days Grace. The tour was very successful and the band sold over 1.6 million tickets with 146 shows.

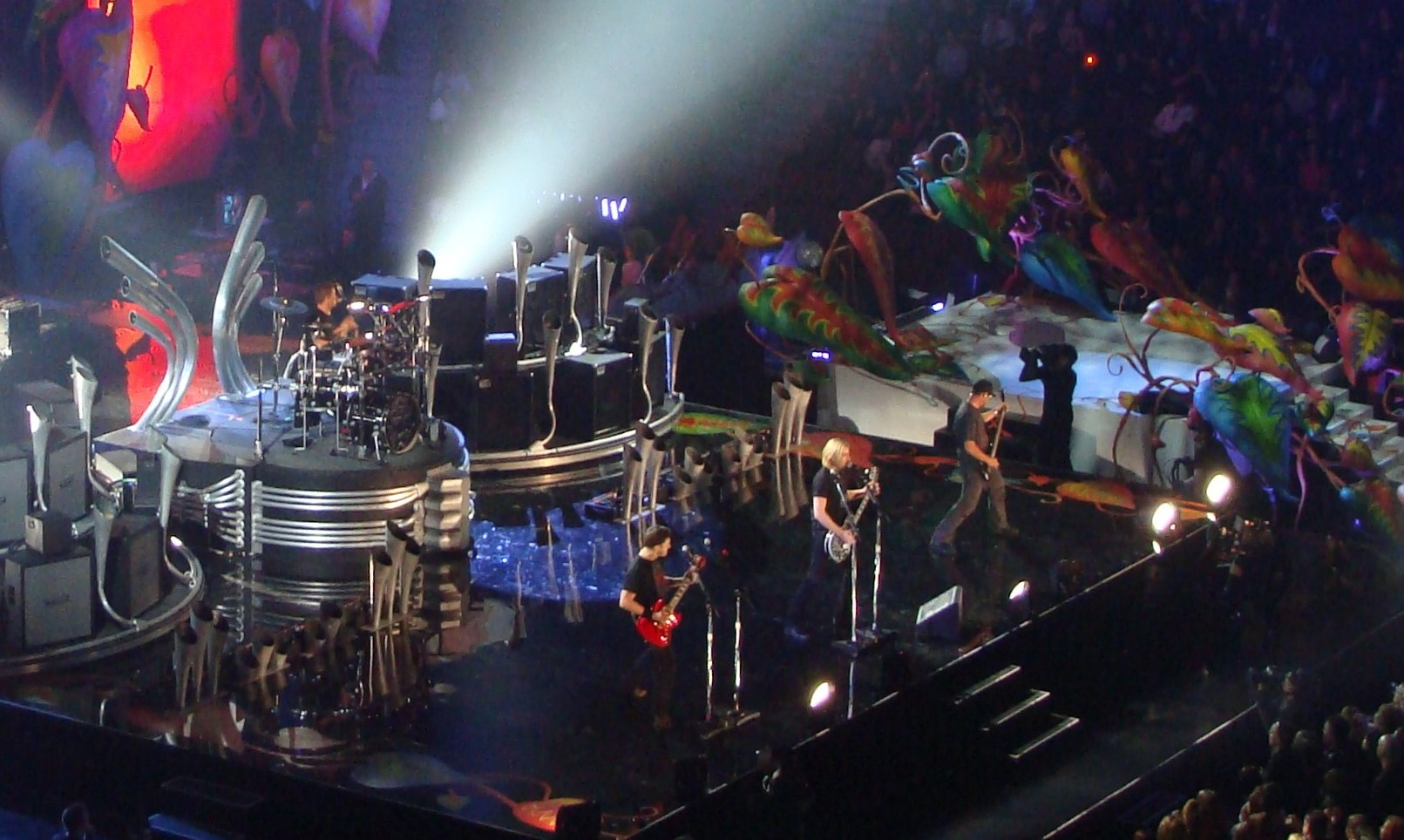
Nickelback at the 2009 Juno Awards

The album also remained in the top 20 on the Billboard 200 for weeks after its release. The album was certified two times platinum in April 2009, and had by April 2010 sold over 3 million copies in the U.S. However, critical reception of the album has been mostly mixed to negative. In 2009, the band won three Juno Awards for Juno Fan Choice Award, group of the year, and album of the year; the band performed their single "Something in Your Mouth" at the ceremony. In 2010, Billboard year end charts listed Dark Horse as the top-selling rock and metal album of the year. The band was also listed at the top selling hard rock artist. On January 29, 2010, they released a Tap-Tap rhythm game for on the App Store, contrary to the band's prior comments against other music related video games such as Guitar Hero. On February 28, 2010, Nickelback gave a performance at the beginning of the concert portion of the 2010 Winter Olympics closing ceremony, performing "Burn It to the Ground". In October 2010 Nickelback finished their Dark Horse Tour.

=== Here and Now (2011–2013) ===
Chad Kroeger said in an interview with Billboard.com in September 2010 that songwriting for the next Nickelback album was planned to commence as early as February 2011 with "about four tunes" already in mind. Adair mentioned that the band wanted to go back to the musical style of All The Right Reasons, which he described as "more organic".

Nickelback announced their new album, Here and Now, on September 8, 2011, along with its two lead singles, "Bottoms Up" and "When We Stand Together". Kroeger said "We're four people who love making music, the way we like to make it. We entered the studio this year with a vision, and it all came together. We're extremely happy with the results, and can't wait to share them with our fans." The album was released on November 21, 2011, with the band calling it "Nickelblack Monday", a play on Nickelback and Black Monday. Two singles were released to radio stations on September 26, and September 27 for purchase on iTunes. Here and Now peaked at number two on the Billboard 200, selling 226,714 copies in its first week of release, with Christmas by Michael Bublé taking number one by a margin of only 419 copies.

As part of promotion for the album, Nickelback was booked to perform at the halftime shows for both an NFL Thanksgiving Day game at Ford Field in Detroit on November 24, and the 99th Grey Cup in Vancouver on November 27. Also, as a promotion the band played to Jimmy Kimmel upon the album's release. The band is nominated for four Juno Awards in 2012, and scheduled to perform at the ceremony. Nickelback announced their Here and Now Tour on January 11, 2012, they are going to tour with Seether, Bush and My Darkest Days. The band released a music video for their fourth single off of the album Lullaby. The band officially announced the compilation album The Best of Nickelback Volume 1 through social media on October 3, 2013. Frontman Chad Kroeger had previously stated in an interview that the greatest hits album was to feature songs from previous albums along with new songs but the unveiled track listing ultimately contained only previously released material.

=== No Fixed Address and Feed the Machine (2014–2018) ===
According to an interview with Chad Kroeger on CFOX-FM, the band planned to release their eighth studio album before the end of 2014. The lead rock single was also announced, "Edge of a Revolution", was released in August 2014. The track was described as a "departure" for Nickelback and a political song. Frequent collaborator Chris Lord-Alge returned to mix some of the tracks on the album. It was also announced the band had signed to Republic Records. The lead single from the album is titled "Edge of a Revolution", and was scheduled to be sent for adds on Rock radio and be released to iTunes on August 18. The lead pop single, and second overall, was announced to be "What Are You Waiting For?", and was released in September. "What Are You Waiting For?" was released as a single on digital retailers on September 9, 2014. On August 22, 2014, Nickelback announced the album's title to be No Fixed Address, and released it on November 17, 2014.

No Fixed Address Tour was their fifth headlining concert tour, in support of No Fixed Address. The tour was announced on November 5, 2014, as well as The Pretty Reckless, Pop Evil, and Lifehouse as the support act for the majority of the shows in North American while Monster Truck was support act in Australia and Europe (2016). The second North American leg of the tour had to be canceled when lead vocalist Chad Kroeger required surgery for a cyst on his voice box. The entire leg of the European tour was postponed until Autumn 2016.

Nickelback performing in Sydney, Australia in February 2019

On August 19, 2016, Nickelback released a cover of Don Henley's song "Dirty Laundry" to streaming services. On January 23, 2017, a new single, "Feed the Machine" was announced to be released on February 1, alongside specific details of a 2017 tour. On January 25, Nickelback signed with BMG Rights Management to release their ninth album, also titled Feed the Machine. The album was released on June 16, 2017. The band released their second single from the album, "Song on Fire", on April 28, 2017. Shortly after the release of the album, the band began a 44-city tour on June 23, 2017, in North America, co-headlined with Daughtry, Shaman's Harvest and Cheap Trick as supporting acts.

=== Get Rollin' (2019–2025) ===
In early 2019, band members spoke of recording a tenth studio album, though Chad Kroeger conceded there was no timetable or rush for the band to complete it. Bassist Mike Kroeger spoke of his personal desire to move in more of a heavy metal direction, or wanting to do an album of Slayer cover songs.

On August 14, 2020, the band released a cover of The Charlie Daniels Band song "The Devil Went Down to Georgia", featuring Dave Martone.

In a July 2021 interview, Mike Kroeger was asked about the band's progress on new music. He stated: "That is happening right now, music is being composed and recorded up in Canada. We were out there, and something came up and our producer had to take some time off. So I took that opportunity to return home to Los Angeles with family and spend a little time at home but I'll be headed back up there in a couple of weeks to pick it up again." When asked about a potential timeframe for a release date, Kroeger said "it'll be done when it's done", explaining that the band would rather not be confined to a timescale for fear of making "a shitty record". "Release dates are primarily arrived at by business interests, like record labels and whatever. We don't have one of those", he said. "We've been managing ourselves for about a year. So, the answer is no. We're doing it on our schedule, at our own pace, and it'll be done when it's done. 'Cause we've blown up deadlines in the past lots of times. Because we feel that you can make a good record and be late, but you can't, or you shouldn't, make a shitty record to be on time. So we won't be pressed for time.

In August 2022, Nickelback began posting small snippets and teasers of new music via their official social media accounts with the date "09.07.2022" being branded on the posts.

On August 26, 2022, students attending school at Simon Fraser University in Burnaby, British Columbia received a newsletter stating they were invited to attend and participate in a video shoot Nickelback would be hosting on August 30, 2022, for their single, outside the Convocation Mall on campus.

The album title was revealed to be Get Rollin'. The lead single "San Quentin" was released on September 7, 2022. The second single "Those Days" was released on October 5, 2022, followed by a music video on October 26. The band embarked on its "Get Rollin' Tour" with opening acts Brantley Gilbert and Josh Ross. They performed on thirty-eight dates in Canada and the United States from June 2023 to August 2023. During the Maryland Heights, Missouri stop of this tour, Kroeger stopped the set during the song "Animals" due to difficulties singing, which he attributed to a prednisone injection he had received earlier. He said: "I cannot sit here with a fucking absolutely destroyed throat and try to make it through this show and pretend like there's nothing fucking wrong and take your fucking money, 'cause that is wrong. I'm having a hard time hittin' fuckin' notes." Kroeger ultimately decided not to end the set after encouragement from bandmates and restarted the song, though the band performed fewer tracks than originally planned.

=== Everything Under the Sun (2026–present) ===
On February 13, 2026, the band was featured on the single and title track from the Don Broco album, Nightmare Tripping.

On March 20, 2026, the band released the song "Bones for the Crows". On July 14, 2026, the band released the song "Rattle the Cage" featuring John 5 and announced their eleventh album Everything Under the Sun. The album was released on October 30, 2026.

== Musical style and influences ==
Nickelback has been described as various genres, including post-grunge, hard rock, pop rock, alternative rock, alternative metal, nu metal, and grunge.

Nickelback have cited bands and musicians such as AC/DC, Anthrax, Alice in Chains, Big Wreck, Creedence Clearwater Revival, Deftones, Extreme, Bob Marley, Megadeth, Meshuggah, Metallica, Motörhead, Nirvana, Ozzy Osbourne, Pantera, Rage Against the Machine, Red Hot Chili Peppers, Slayer, Testament, U2 and Van Halen as influential or inspirational.

Common lyrical themes explored in Nickelback songs include strippers, sexual intercourse, prostitutes, recreational drug use, and alcohol consumption. Stereogum stated that the band's songs "are filled with odes to hedonism, strippers, and that discount booze from Sam's Club life." Many of the band's lyricisms are sexually suggestive in nature. Metal Injection wrote: "Nothing gets a lady moist like Chad Kroeger’s voice. You see, singers these days are afraid to get down and dirty with their lyrics. Not Chad... he wants a lady’s pants around her feet and he’s man enough to say it!" Loudwire stated that the line "No is a dirty word" in the song "S.E.X." was "problematic at best", and that it "unfortunately points to one of metal's biggest criticisms — that it sometimes advocates for misogyny".

Despite being known for these themes and topics, BuzzFeed stated the opinion that the band were "unbelievably feminist" and that their songs were socially conscious. Joel Burrows of Tone Deaf stated that "the band have also delved deep into the crux of the human condition as well, navigating the trajectory of topics such as love and loss". Other themes explored in their music include addiction, mass media, injustice and mental health, and politics. In 2023, Loudwire published an article that argued the case that many of the band's lyrics "would fit in any metal song".

== Critical reception ==
We recorded [lyrics such as] ‘You look so much cuter with something in your mouth,’… I mean these songs, you guys play these songs on the radio! I think it is hilarious. [...] Anybody that thinks that we take this band seriously is hilarious cause were just four goofballs sitting there going, ‘Can you imagine if they play this on the radio?’ Then you guys play it on the radio.

— Chad Kroeger of Nickelback, as quoted by Liberty Dunworth of Guitar.com (November 14, 2022)

=== Critical response and reputation ===
Nickelback has been subjected to numerous jokes and a vocal negative response for some audiences, some of which is attributed to the perceived derivative, repetitive and formulaic nature of their music. Stereogum's Tom Breihan described Nickelback as "the most widely disrespected rock band of the 21st century". In September 2011, after the NHL had commissioned Nickelback to perform at the first Winnipeg Jets game, the Winnipeg Free Press published an open letter asking the organization to not let them play. Similarly, in November of that year, residents of Detroit protested the band playing the Thanksgiving Day Detroit Lions football game. That same month, users of the music-oriented dating site Tastebuds.fm voted Nickelback as the number one "musical turnoff".

In May 2013, the readers of Rolling Stone magazine named Nickelback the second-worst band of the 1990s, behind only Creed. That same year, Angelica Leicht of Houston Press placed Nickelback at third on its list of "The 10 Suckiest Bands of the ’00s", in which she wrote: "I don’t even need to explain why Nickleback sucks." The same publication would eventually publish an article in 2017 titled "10 Bands You Should Hate Instead of Nickelback", which included acts such as Five Finger Death Punch, The Smashing Pumpkins, Kanye West, Maroon 5, U2, The Red Hot Chili Peppers, Radiohead and Pearl Jam.

Journalist Sage Lazzaro claimed that Nickelback's negative reputation began when the band signed to Roadrunner Records and was disliked by the label's followers, which at the time was known for heavy metal music. She also wrote that a frequently aired 2003 commercial for Comedy Central's Tough Crowd with Colin Quinn contributed to this spreading when it insulted Nickelback and the commercial gained mass exposure. In 2014, Angelica Leicht of Houston Press conferred the title of "the reigning butt-rock band always and forever" on Nickelback.

Some have criticized the band for a perceived overreliance on hedonistic and misogynistic themes. Christopher Rosa of VH1 said in 2015: "Not only are they bad, but they sound like they came straight from a horny 18-year-old boy's mind. Seriously, where's the sophistication? Where's the class? All that we have here is misogyny—gross, tone-deaf misogyny that is particularly cringe-worthy in 2015." However, in a review for the band's ninth album Feed the Machine, AllMusic reviewer Stephen Thomas Erlewine noted that they had mostly done away with the crude and vulgar lyrical content they had become known for, and praised the band for evolving their sound. In 2015, a marketing expert surveyed 225 popular songs and found that Nickelback had the "most sophisticated" lyrics among the rock music artists included in the study, though Maclean's writer Amanda Shendruk later published an article questioning the legitimacy of this study. That same year, another study suggested that Nickelback had "more intelligent" lyrics than those of Foo Fighters and Linkin Park.

Also in 2015, Vice published an article that asserted that the band was underappreciated. One year later in 2016, a student at the University of Eastern Finland named Salli Anttonen conducted a study called "Hypocritical Bullshit Performed Through Gritted Teeth: Authenticity Discourses in Nickelback’s Album Reviews in Finnish Media" in an attempt to ascertain the root cause of the band's negative feedback. He concluded that the most prevalent trend in the "hate" was perceived lack of authenticity. He said: "Nickelback is too much of everything to be enough of something. They follow genre expectations too well, which is seen as empty imitation. But also not well enough, which is read as commercial tactics and as a lack of a stable and sincere identity."

During 2018, the band was defended in a teaser trailer for the film Once Upon a Deadpool by the title character. In response, Nickelback released a video in 2024 defending the sequel Deadpool & Wolverine from criticism. The band is profiled in Hate to Love: Nickelback, a 2023 documentary film by Leigh Brooks which focuses on the band's reputation. Additionally, various musicians, such as Chris Martin, Timbaland, Keyshia Cole, and SZA have publicly shown support for the band. Following their 2008 album Dark Horse, Chart Attack credited the band's success to knowing their target audience: "Chad Kroeger is a genius because he knows exactly what people want and precisely how far he can go. He turned out an extremely racy album that's loaded with songs about gettin' drunk and doin' it all without breaking any taboos, and with enough love and moral authority to grease its passage into the mainstream. Rejoice, North America. This is your world." Billboard praised the band in a review of Dark Horse by saying: "The bulletproof Nickelback provides affordable fun that promises good returns in hard times."

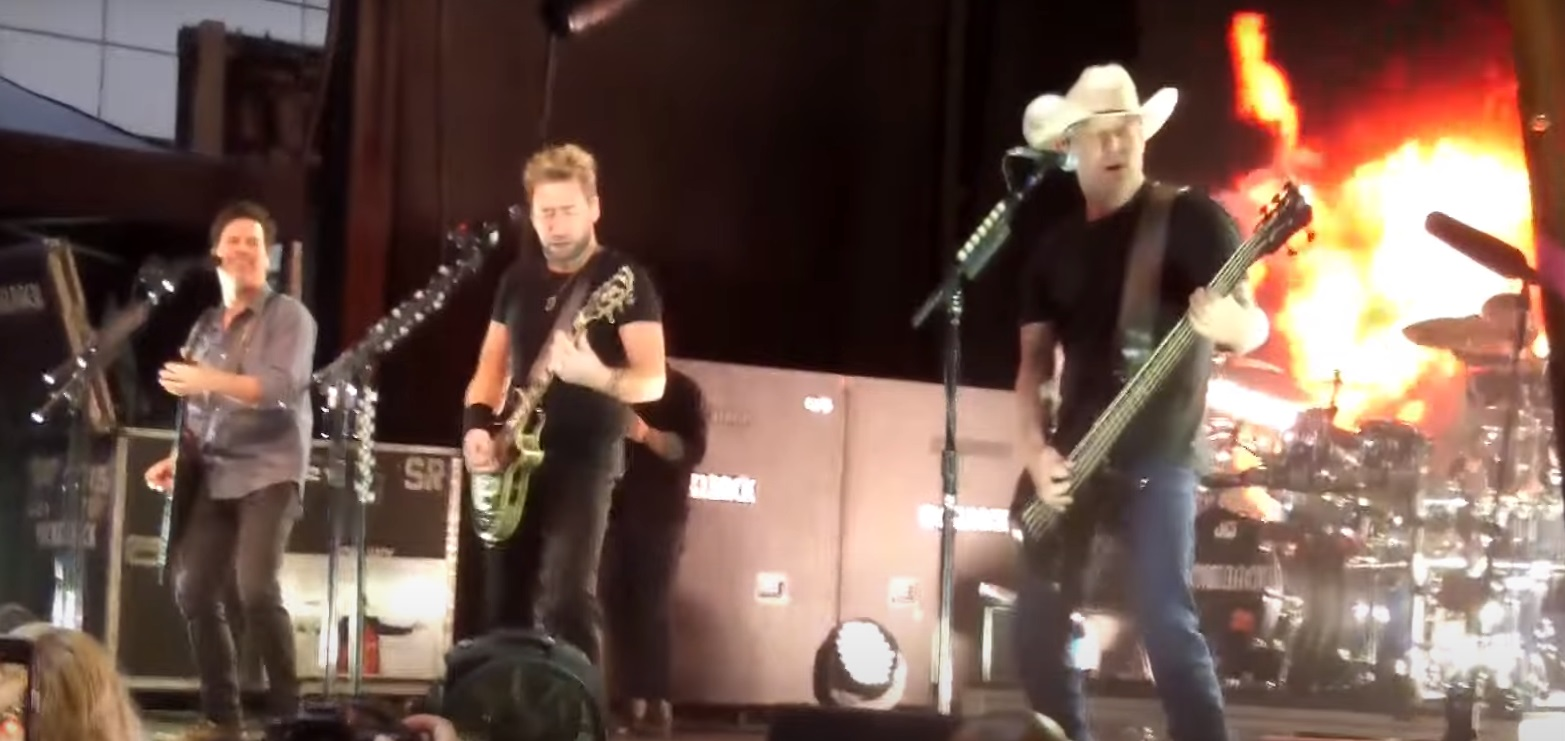
Nickelback live at the 2023 Toronto International Film Festival

=== Response to criticism ===
In 2012, the band personally and sarcastically responded to tweets from people on Twitter criticizing them. In spite of the negative reviews, Chad Kroeger commented in a 2014 interview that the criticism helped him "grow a thick skin", and that without it, they would be "this just whatever band" or "Green Day". That same year, he was quoted saying: "I love it [The] more controversy that surrounds either myself, my personal life, the band, whatever – I think it’s hilarious. All these critics, they’re just tireless [...] They don’t know that they’re still responsible for us being around today. If [critics] had stopped writing all this stuff about us, there would be no controversy left in the band and we probably would have died out years ago."

In 2023, he stated that negativity towards the band had been less scathing as it had been in previous years. He said: "I think there's been a softening, there really has, thankfully. I'm not sure if it's because we receive a ton of love on TikTok or whatever the hell it is, but for whatever reason the teeth have kind of been removed. It's really nice, it's really nice to not be Public Enemy Number One." Kroeger attributed some of the vitriol towards Nickelback as partially due to overplaying of the band's tracks on radio stations: "You're trying to switch the radio station three times, and it's just, like, 'Ah, there they are. There's their rock song on the rock station. There's their pop song on the pop station. And oh my god, I can't even go to the country station and get away from these guys.' That type of over-saturation could piss people off. But at the end of the day, we're just a band that makes music."

== Cultural impact ==
=== In popular culture ===
In the 2010s, Nickelback became the subject of internet memes that criticized their music, a status that the band came to embrace. Several sources, including CBC News and The Daily Telegraph, named Nickelback the "most hated" band of the internet world. In 2010, the band made headlines for losing a "popularity contest" after a pickle earned more Facebook likes than the band on the social media platform. The page's creator said: "This is all strictly intended for humour. I am not using this page to endorse any hate toward the band Nickelback ... I do not wish Nickelback, or any other bands, any ill will and hope they would see the same humour in making this page as I have." In November 2011, a plugin was released for Chrome and Firefox browsers called NICKELBLOCK designed to obscure all mentions of the band from the user's browser while activated.

=== In politics and law ===
Nickelback has been mentioned within US political discourse on several occasions as early as 2016. Prior to Donald Trump's victory in the 2016 Republican Party presidential primaries, Nate Silver of ABC News referred to him as "the Nickelback of GOP candidates", in that in his view he is "disliked by most people but with a few very passionate admirers." In 2016, an attendee at a Trump rally made headlines when he held up a sign that read "Trump likes Nickelback" behind Trump's podium. The sign was confiscated by campaign staff. In 2019, US congressmen Mark Pocan and Rodney Davis argued about Nickelback's music on the house floor after Pocan made a joke about the band. Later that same year, Twitter removed a Nickelback meme tweeted by Trump for copyright violations. The meme was originally shared for the purpose of attacking his political opponent Joe Biden. Bassist Mike Kroeger said during an interview at Oxford Union: "Our reaction was to not react. Anybody who was paying attention would see that we didn't react. We didn't — we left it and didn't engage it." Guitarist Ryan Peake said: "I didn't wanna be dragged into any kind of partisan politics, any kind of agenda. I don't think that's our place." Nickelback reportedly enjoyed an increase in album sales and online streams following the incident.

In 2025, California governor Gavin Newsom used the band's song "Photograph" to troll Trump regarding the push to release the Epstein files.

Nickelback has also been mentioned in official statements from local law enforcement agencies on several occasions. In 2015, police in Australia released to the public a mock "wanted poster" of the band. They posted to Facebook: "Avoid the area. It may be hazardous to your hearing and street cred." In 2016, police in the Prince Edward Island town of Kensington reportedly threatened to punish DUI suspects by forcing them to listen to Nickelback in the squad car en route to jail. The police were quoted as follows in a message to the public: "Now, now, no need to thank us, we figure if you are foolish enough to get behind the wheel after drinking then a little Chad Kroeger and the boys is the perfect gift for you. So please, let’s not ruin a perfectly good unopened copy of Nickelback. You don’t drink and drive and we won’t make you listen to it."

== Band members ==
Current members

- Chad Kroeger – lead vocals, guitar (1995–present)
- Ryan Peake – guitar, backing vocals (1995–present), keyboards (2002–present)
- Mike Kroeger – bass, occasional backing vocals (1995–present)
- Daniel Adair – drums, percussion, backing vocals (2005–present)

Former members

- Brandon Kroeger – drums (1995–1997)
- Mitch Guindon – drums (1997–1998)
- Ryan Vikedal – drums, percussion (1998–2005)

== Discography ==
Studio albums

- Curb (1996)
- The State (1998)
- Silver Side Up (2001)
- The Long Road (2003)
- All the Right Reasons (2005)
- Dark Horse (2008)
- Here and Now (2011)
- No Fixed Address (2014)
- Feed the Machine (2017)
- Get Rollin' (2022)
- Everything Under the Sun (2026)

== Awards ==
- 2003 – Won SOCAN International Achievement Award for the song "How You Remind Me"
- 2004 – Won SOCAN International Achievement Award
- 2005 – Won SOCAN International Achievement Award
- 2007 – Won SOCAN International Achievement Award
- 2008 – Won SOCAN International Achievement Award
