= Curb (album) =

Studio album by Nickelback
- Released: May 15, 1996
- Recorded: January 1996 (rest of album); August 1995 ("Fly" and "Window Shopper")
- Studios: Turtle Recording Studios (Richmond, British Columbia); Crosstown Studios (North Vancouver, British Columbia)
- Genres: Grunge; hard rock; alternative metal
- Length: 46:30
- Labels: FACTOR; Shoreline (first reissue); Roadrunner (second reissue)
- Producers: Larry Anschell; Jeff Boyd

Nickelback chronology
Hesher (1996)	Curb (1996)	The State (1998)

Singles from Curb
- 1. "Fly" Released: August 1, 1996

Alternate cover
- 2002 Roadrunner Records reissue cover

Curb is the debut studio album by Canadian rock band Nickelback. Recorded at Turtle Recording Studios in Richmond, British Columbia, with producer Larry Anschell, it was originally released exclusively in Canada by FACTOR (the Foundation Assisting Canadian Talent on Recordings) on May 15, 1996. The album was reissued locally later in the year by Shoreline Records. After Nickelback signed with Roadrunner Records in 1999, Curb was remastered and released internationally on June 25, 2002. However, the remastered edition is controversial for its audio quality compared to the original issue as its dynamic range was significantly reduced and introduced severe clipping problems throughout.

After releasing their debut EP Hesher earlier in the year, Nickelback recorded their debut full-length album in 1996. Much of the material dates back as far as 1993, and was written primarily by the band's lead vocalist and guitarist Chad Kroeger, although all four band members are credited equally. Two songs from Hesher, "Where?" and "Left", were re-recorded for the album, while the original versions of "Fly" and "Window Shopper" were only remixed and remastered. Chad Kroeger, in an interview in 2000, described Curb as "raw" with "a lot of good songs".

In 2000, according to Nickelback's website, Curb sold more than 10,000 units. Upon its international re-release in 2002, Curb registered at number 182 on the US Billboard 200 and number 185 on the UK Albums Chart. The album was certified gold by Music Canada in 2010 and silver by the British Phonographic Industry in 2015. "Fly" was issued as the only single and music video from Curb.

== Background ==
Most of the material on Nickelback's debut album was written by the band's lead vocalist and guitarist Chad Kroeger dating back as far as 1993, and was largely influenced by the music of Seattle during that period, particularly grunge. The album's title track was written about and named after a teenage friend of Kroeger's called Kirby, who was involved in a road traffic accident in which the driver of the other vehicle was his girlfriend at the time, who was killed as a result of the collision. Speaking about the incident, Kroeger recalled that "He [Kirby] came over a hill in the middle of nowhere on a dirt gravel road and had a head-on collision with a car. He stumbled out of the car bleeding and bashed up pretty bad, and he opened up the [door of the other] car, and it's his girlfriend. She snuck out at the same time, was going to see him and he killed her on the back of a dirt road. I tried to imagine what they could possibly feel like, and that's where that song comes from". The cover art for the original 1996 release features the aftermath of a car crash, whereas the 2002 reissue on Roadrunner changed it to a shot of a highway road.

Curb was recorded in January 1996 at Turtle Recording Studios in Richmond, British Columbia. The album was produced, engineered, mixed and mastered by Larry Anschell, founder of Turtle Recording. "Fly" and "Window Shopper" were taken directly from the band's debut EP Hesher, which was recorded at Crosstown Studios in North Vancouver, British Columbia with producer Jeff Boyd; it was released earlier in the year. "Where?" and "Left" were also originally released on Hesher, but were subsequently re-recorded for Curb. The album's title track features two guest musicians: drummer Boyd Grealy and cellist Ariel Watson. "Just Four" was re-recorded as "Just For" for the band's major label debut album Silver Side Up in 2001.

== Controversy ==
On January 25, 2002, Nickelback's former management company Amar Management filed a breach of contract lawsuit against the band that claimed that the group had "wrongfully terminated the contract and has failed to pay the management company commissions, disbursements, and various other fees as a result of services rendered". The band counter-claimed that the management company had "wrongfully retained or took possession of Curb from the plaintiffs [Nickelback] in August of 1998", seeking to regain ownership of the album's original master recordings. The latter claim was settled in Nickelback's favour, giving them the full rights to their debut album. In 2003, the album's producer Larry Anschell also sued the band for "production royalties and property rights" to the songs on Curb.

== Reception ==
Professional ratings
Review scores
Source	Rating
musicOMH	Unfavorable
The Rolling Stone Album Guide	1.5/5 stars
The Encyclopedia of Popular Music	3/5 stars

Curb received mixed to negative reviews from critics. In The New Rolling Stone Album Guide, published in 2004, Curb was awarded one and a half stars and criticised for its "generic heft [which] got the band nowhere". Reviewing the album for musicOMH, David Rafaello claimed that Curb is "stuck in a time capsule labelled 'mid-90s paralysis'", suggesting that it was only released internationally in 2002 in an attempt to "cash in on the momentary fame and success of the group". Continuing to condemn the album, Rafaello suggested that "It's hard to think of another recent release by any major force that is so monochromatic and derivative", berating frontman Chad Kroeger's vocal performance and labelling "most" of the songs on the record as "dull".

Upon its international release by Roadrunner Records in 2002, Curb registered at number 182 on the US Billboard 200. The album also entered the UK Albums Chart at number 185, peaked at number 24 on the UK Rock & Metal Albums Chart, reached number 79 on the German Albums Chart, and reached number 72 on the Swiss Albums Chart. Despite not charting in the band's home country, Curb was certified gold by Music Canada in 2010 for sales of 50,000 units; in 2015, the album was certified silver by the British Phonographic Industry for sales in the UK of 60,000 units.

== Track listing ==
All lyrics are written by Chad Kroeger; all music is composed by Nickelback, except where noted.

No.	Title	Length
1.	"Little Friend"	3:48
2.	"Pusher"	4:00
3.	"Detangler"	3:41
4.	"Curb"	4:51
5.	"Where?^{[a]}^{[b]}" (Nickelback, Jeff Boyd)	4:27
6.	"Falls Back On"	2:57
7.	"Sea Groove"	3:57
8.	"Fly^{[a]}" (Nickelback, Boyd)	2:53
9.	"Just Four^{[c]}"	3:53
10.	"Left^{[a]}^{[b]}" (Nickelback, Boyd)	4:03
11.	"Window Shopper^{[a]}^{1}" (Nickelback, Boyd)	3:42
12.	"I Don't Have"	4:06
Total length:		46:30

^{a} Previously appeared on the Hesher EP (1996)
^{b} Re-recorded song from Hesher
^{c} Re-recorded as "Just For" on Silver Side Up (2001)

== Personnel ==
Nickelback
- Chad Kroeger – vocals, lead guitar
- Ryan Peake – rhythm guitar, backing vocals
- Mike Kroeger – bass
- Brandon Kroeger – drums

Guest musicians

- Boyd Grealy – drums on "Curb"
- Ariel Watson – cello on "Curb"

Production (original 1996 release)

- Larry Anschell – production, engineering, mixing, mastering
- Jeff Boyd – production and engineering on "Fly" and "Window Shopper"
- George Leger – mastering
- Steve Boyd – cover artwork
- Pete Digiboy – interior and rear cover artwork

2002 reissue

- George Marino – mastering
- Lynda Kusnetz – creative director
- Mr. Scott – package design, photography
- Daniel Moss – rear cover photography

== Charts ==
=== Weekly charts ===
Weekly chart performance for Curb
Chart (2002)	Peak position
German Albums (Offizielle Top 100)	79
Swiss Albums (Schweizer Hitparade)	72
UK Albums (OCC)	185
UK Rock & Metal Albums (OCC)	24
US Billboard 200	182

=== Year-end charts ===
Year-end chart performance for Curb
Chart (2002)	Position
Canadian Alternative Albums (Nielsen SoundScan)	129
Canadian Metal Albums (Nielsen SoundScan)	65

== Certifications ==
Region	Certification	Sales/shipments
Canada (Music Canada)	Gold	50,000^{^}
United Kingdom (BPI)	Silver	60,000^{^}
^{^}shipments figures based on certification alone.

== Appearances ==
- The song "Fly" was featured in the movies Horsey and Barnone in 1997; the songs "Curb", "Detangler" and "Little Friend" were also featured in the latter.
- The song "Left" was featured in the Highlander: The Raven episode "War and Peace" in 1999.

== Notes ==
^{1.} Song originally named "Windowshopper" on Hesher.
