= Like What =

Single by Tommi
- Released: 23 June 2003
- Recorded: 2003
- Genre: Pop-rap
- Label: Sony
- Lyricists: Kandi Burruss, Tionne Watkins
- Producer: Bloodshy & Avant

Tommi singles chronology
"What Part of No" (2002)	"Like What" (2003)

"Like What" is a song by British girl group Tommi. It was their last release before disappearing off the music scene due to disputes with their manager. The single charted at number 12 on the UK Singles Chart, remaining within the top 40 for a total of eight weeks.

== Track listings ==
UK CD 1

1. "Like What" (radio edit)
2. "He's a Galist" (album version)
3. "Like What" (Kardinal Beats salsa remix)

UK CD 2

1. "Like What" (video edit)
2. "Like What" (Cedsolo radio mix)
3. "Like What" (Juliano Creator remix)

== Chart positions ==
Chart (2003)	Peak Position
Irish Singles Chart	38
UK Singles Chart	12
