= Something in Your Mouth =

Single by Nickelback

from the album Dark Horse
- Released: October 28, 2008
- Recorded: March–July 2008 at Mountain View Studios, Abbotsford, British Columbia
- Genre: Hard rock; alternative metal; post-grunge
- Length: 3:39
- Label: Roadrunner
- Songwriters: Robert John "Mutt" Lange, Chad Kroeger, Joey Moi
- Producer: Robert John "Mutt" Lange

Nickelback singles chronology
"Gotta Be Somebody" (2008)	"Something in Your Mouth" (2008)	"If Today Was Your Last Day" (2008)

"Something in Your Mouth" is the second single and first promotional single from Canadian rock band Nickelback's sixth studio album Dark Horse. The song was released as a digital download to the US iTunes Store on October 28, 2008, and as the second single to rock radio on December 15 the same year. It is much heavier than the first single "Gotta Be Somebody", with a hard rock and alternative metal sound, reminiscent of the album as a whole. The song is also used in the 2009 film American Pie Presents: The Book of Love.

== Reception ==
Christopher Rosa of VH1 wrote: "OK, Nickelback: So, women are more appealing to you when they can't talk? That's what you're saying right now. If it's not, please offer an explanation. I'd love to hear it."

== Charts ==
=== Weekly charts ===
Chart (2009)	Peak position
Canada Hot 100 (Billboard)	48
Canada Rock (Billboard)	4
US Billboard Hot 100	96
US Alternative Airplay (Billboard)	21
US Mainstream Rock (Billboard)	1

=== Year-end charts ===
Chart (2009)	Position
US Mainstream Rock (Billboard)	5

== Certifications ==
Region	Certification	Certified units/sales
Canada (Music Canada)	2× Platinum	160,000^{‡}
New Zealand (RMNZ)	Platinum	30,000^{‡}
United Kingdom (BPI)	Silver	200,000^{‡}
United States (RIAA)	Platinum	1,000,000^{‡}
^{‡} Sales+streaming figures based on certification alone.
