= Hesher (EP) =

EP by Nickelback
- Released: March 10, 1996
- Recorded: August 15–17, 1995
- Studios: Crosstown Studios (North Vancouver, British Columbia)
- Genre: Grunge
- Length: 27:53
- Label: Self-released
- Producers: Jeff Boyd; Nickelback

Nickelback chronology
Hesher (1996)	Curb (1996)

Hesher is an extended play and the first release by Canadian rock band Nickelback.

All the songs were written and performed by Nickelback, the first songs lead singer Chad Kroeger wrote for the band. It was recorded in Vancouver and released March 10, 1996. Supposedly, the name came from a friend of the band who would frequently say "Hey sure". After selling more than 1,000 copies, the band stopped production of the EP, and it is now a sought-after collector's item. Chad Kroeger has often expressed his dislike of Hesher and has even described it as "terrible", however he did once claim in a 2009 interview that the track "Fly" is "pretty good".

Vancouver radio station CFOX-FM drew professional interest to the EP when it played "Fly" once a day.

Hesher was the first of only two releases from the band to feature Chad and Mike Kroeger's cousin Brandon Kroeger as the drummer, the other being their 1996 debut studio album Curb. Four of the seven songs on Hesher were later placed on Curb; "Where?" and "Left" were re-recorded entirely, while the original versions of "Windowshopper" and "Fly" were re-mixed and re-mastered significantly for the debut. "Windowshopper" was renamed "Window Shopper" on Curb.

== Recording ==
Chad Kroeger asked his step-father to give him $4,000 so that the band could record the EP. The band spent half the money to record the EP, and spent the other half on magic mushrooms.

== Track listing ==
All lyrics are written by Chad Kroeger; all music is composed by Nickelback.

No.	Title	Length
1.	"Where?^{[b]}"	5:07
2.	"Windowshopper^{[a]}^{1}"	3:45
3.	"Fly^{[a]}"	2:56
4.	"Truck"	3:56
5.	"Left^{[b]}"	3:54
6.	"In Front of Me"	5:36
7.	"D.C."	4:46
Total length:		29:35

^{a} Appears re-mixed and re-mastered on Curb (1996)
^{b} Re-recorded for Curb

== Personnel ==
Nickelback

- Chad Kroeger – lead vocals, lead guitar
- Ryan Peake – rhythm guitar, backing vocals
- Mike Kroeger – bass
- Brandon Kroeger – drums

== Notes ==
^{1.} Song renamed "Window Shopper" on Curb.
