= Tommi (group) =

- Genres: Hip hop, pop
- Years active: 2002-2003
- Labels: Sony, MO-AM
- Past members: Lil' Chill; Michelle "Mi$ Thang" Francoise; Lily "Bambi" Wembridge; Catherine "Peekaboo" Adesegon; Nikki "Stylus" Ferris

Tommi were a short-lived British girl group formed in 2003. They only released two singles, "What Part of No" and "Like What" which reached number 12 on the UK Singles Chart and number 38 in Ireland.

== Members ==
- Catherine "Peekaboo" Adesegon - rap, backing vocals
- Lil' Chill - backing vocals, duo
- Lily "Bambi" Wembridge - rap, backing vocals, duo
- Michelle "Mi$ Thang" Francoise - lead vocals
- Nikki "Stylus" Ferris - lead vocals, rap

== Discography ==
=== Singles ===
- "What Part of No"
- "Like What" - #12 UK, #38 IRE
