= If Today Was Your Last Day =

Single by Nickelback

from the album Dark Horse
- Released: November 11, 2008 (iTunes); November 2008 (CAN radio); March 31, 2009 (US radio); June 15, 2009 (UK)
- Recorded: March–July 2008
- Studio: Mountain View Studios, Abbotsford, British Columbia
- Genre: Post-grunge
- Length: 4:08
- Label: Roadrunner
- Songwriters: Chad Kroeger, Ryan Peake, Mike Kroeger, Daniel Adair
- Producer: Robert John "Mutt" Lange

Nickelback singles chronology
"Something in Your Mouth" (2008)	"If Today Was Your Last Day" (2008)	"I'd Come for You" (2009)

Music video
- "If Today Was Your Last Day" on YouTube

"If Today Was Your Last Day" is the third single from Nickelback's sixth studio album Dark Horse. It was originally planned as the first single, to hit all U.S. radio formats September 30, 2008, but was scrapped as the first single in favour of "Gotta Be Somebody". Instead it was released on March 31, 2009. It was produced by Robert John "Mutt" Lange, who produced the entire album. The song was released as a digital download in the U.S. on November 11. "If Today Was Your Last Day" was released in the UK on June 15. The song was performed live for the first time on May 22 at the Manchester Arena in Manchester, England.

In the US, the song has sold over 1,500,000 downloads, as of February 2010. According to Roadrunner Records UK, the song is "dynamically swelling our bank accounts". The song has also apparently been around with Nickelback for a while, but had never been finished. The song received Gold certification in Australia.

Lead vocalist/guitarist Chad Kroeger has mentioned the song as his personal favorite from Dark Horse. He had described the middle part of the song as "very motivational, and very positive".

The song was used for promotional videos in the Winter Olympics in 2010, and was used as the closing song during NHL Tonight's 2012 Stanley Cup playoffs coverage.

== Music video ==
The music video was shot with director Nigel Dick in March 2009. Performance portions of the video were shot at the Qwest Center in Omaha, Nebraska and in New York City. The other portion was shot in Philadelphia, Pennsylvania. The music video premiered on 23 April.

In the video, two teenage boys dressed in black seem to be up to some sort of business in Philadelphia. They record their journey on a camcorder and carry mysterious black bags with them. They stand on top of a bridge ready and open the bags to confetti with quotes from the song such as "Forgive your Enemy," "It's Never Too Late," "Call a Friend and Reminisce", and "Fall in Love" fall over the people beneath them. This inspires two women to hand out coats with messages similar to those on the colored paper, a well-dressed man to hand money to everyone he meets, an arguing couple make up, and a man presumably arguing with his boss to quit. All of the quotes refer to lines in the song "If Today Was Your Last Day".

== Track listing ==
1. "If Today Was Your Last Day" (album version) – 4:08

== Charts ==
In November 2008, "If Today Was Your Last Day" debuted at number 35 on the Billboard Hot 100 in the US based on downloads only. After its release as an official single, it re-entered the Hot 100 and reached a new peak at 19. It is their second top twenty hit on the Hot 100 from Dark Horse, and their ninth top twenty hit on the chart overall. In Canada, it debuted at 91 on the Canadian Hot 100 also based on just downloads, and after its physical release in Canada and receiving airplay it made a re-entry on the chart at number 67 and would go on to reach number 7.

=== Weekly charts ===
Weekly chart performance for "If Today Was Your Last Day"
Chart (2008–10)	Peak position
Australia (ARIA)	26
Austria (Ö3 Austria Top 40)	31
Canada Hot 100 (Billboard)	7
Canada AC (Billboard)	12
Canada CHR/Top 40 (Billboard)	5
Canada Hot AC (Billboard)	3
Germany (GfK)	31
Luxembourg Digital Songs (Billboard)	3
Netherlands (Dutch Top 40 Tipparade)	16
Russia Airplay (TopHit)	14
Slovakia Airplay (ČNS IFPI)	58
Sweden (Sverigetopplistan)	32
Switzerland (Schweizer Hitparade)	30
UK Singles (Official Charts)	64
UK Rock & Metal (Official Charts)	1
US Billboard Hot 100	19
US Adult Contemporary (Billboard)	14
US Adult Pop Airplay (Billboard)	2
US Mainstream Rock Airplay (Billboard)	32
US Pop Airplay (Billboard)	12

=== Year-end charts ===
2009 year-end chart performance for "If Today Was Your Last Day"
Chart (2009)	Position
Australia (ARIA)	80
Canada (Canadian Hot 100)	22
Russia Airplay (TopHit)	40
US Billboard Hot 100	70
US Adult Contemporary Songs (Billboard)	33
US Adult Pop Songs (Billboard)	13

2010 year-end chart performance for "If Today Was Your Last Day"
Chart (2010)	Position
Russia Airplay (TopHit)	101

2011 year-end chart performance for "If Today Was Your Last Day"
Chart (2011)	Position
Russia Airplay (TopHit)	161

== Certifications ==
Certifications for "If Today Was Your Last Day"
Region	Certification	Certified units/sales
Australia (ARIA)	Gold	35,000^{^}
Canada (Music Canada)	4× Platinum	320,000^{‡}
Denmark (IFPI Danmark)	Gold	45,000^{‡}
New Zealand (RMNZ)	Platinum	30,000^{‡}
United Kingdom (BPI)	Gold	400,000^{‡}
United States (RIAA)	4× Platinum	4,000,000^{‡}
^{^} Shipments figures based on certification alone.^{‡} Sales+streaming figures based on certification alone.
