= Leave This Town Tour =

2009–10 concert tour by Daughtry

- Tour by Daughtry
- Associated album: Leave This Town
- Start date: October 19, 2009
- End date: October 29, 2010
- No. of shows: 93 in North America; 15 in Europe; 2 in South Africa; 1 in Asia; 111 total

Daughtry concert chronology
- Leave This Town Tour (2009–10); Break the Spell Tour (2012)

The Leave This Town Tour was the first headlining concert tour, as well as first international tour, by American rock band, Daughtry. The tour was in support of the band's second album, Leave This Town (2009). The first North American leg kicked off in Topeka, Kansas on October 19, 2009. The tour concluded on October 29, 2010, in Johannesburg, South Africa. The 2010 North American leg of the tour grosses $11.4M and was the 60th best selling North American tour in 2010.

== Background ==
The first North American leg began in October 2009. The band then toured Europe, serving as the opening act on Nickelback's Dark Horse Tour. The North American shows resumed with a more extensive second leg, which concluded in Summer 2010.

== Opening acts ==
- Cavo
- Theory of a Deadman
- Lifehouse
- Kris Allen
- Skillet (appeared to replace Lifehouse on one date)

== Set lists ==
Set I

2009

1. Every Time You Turn Around
2. It's Not Over
3. Ghost of Me
4. No Surprise
5. Life After You
6. What I Want
7. Open Up Your Eyes
8. September
9. Tennessee Line
10. In the Air Tonight (Phill Collins cover)
11. Call Your Name
12. Over You
13. Possum Kingdom (Toadies cover)
14. Feels Like Tonight
15. You Don't Belong
- Encore
1. Home
2. There and Back Again
Set II

Europe

1. Every Time You Turn Around
2. What I Want
3. Ghost of Me
4. No Surprise
5. It's Not Over
6. Over You
7. Feels Like Tonight
8. You Don't Belong
9. Home
10. There and Back Again
Set III

2010

1. Every Time You Turn Around
2. What I Want
3. Ghost of Me
4. No Surprise
5. Life After You
6. It's Not Over
7. Learn My Lesson
8. Tennessee Line
9. September
10. In the Air Tonight (Phill Collins cover)
11. Supernatural
12. Over You
13. Feels Like Tonight
14. You Don't Belong
- Encore
1. Home
2. There and Back Again
During the Nashville show, Chris performed Tracy Chapman's "Fast Car" with Kelly Clarkson, and The Allman Brothers Band "Whipping Post" with Brad Arnold of 3 Doors Down

== Tour dates ==
| Date | City | Country | Venue |
North America Leg 1
| October 19, 2009 | Topeka | United States | Landon Arena |
| October 21, 2009 | Omaha | United States | Omaha Civic Auditorium |
| October 22, 2009 | Ames | United States | Hilton Coliseum |
| October 24, 2009 | Madison | United States | Alliant Energy Center |
| October 25, 2009 | Peoria | United States | Peoria Civic Center |
| October 26, 2009 | Fort Wayne | United States | Allen County War Memorial Coliseum |
| October 28, 2009 | East Lansing | United States | Breslin Student Events Center |
| October 29, 2009 | Saginaw | United States | Dow Event Center |
| October 31, 2009 | Toledo | United States | Lucas County Arena |
| November 2, 2009 | Toronto | Canada | Air Canada Centre |
| November 4, 2009 | Youngstown | United States | Covelli Centre |
| November 5, 2009 | Reading | United States | Sovereign Center |
| November 6, 2009 | Atlantic City | United States | Etess Arena |
| November 12, 2009 | Greensboro | United States | Greensboro Coliseum |
| November 13, 2009 | Highland Heights | United States | The Bank of Kentucky Center |
| November 14, 2009 | Huntington | United States | Big Sandy Superstore Arena |
| November 16, 2009 | Wilkes-Barre | United States | Wachovia Arena |
| November 17, 2009 | Bridgeport | United States | Arena at Harbor Yard |
| November 19, 2009 | Fairfax | United States | Patriot Center |
| November 20, 2009 | Charlottesville | United States | John Paul Jones Arena |
| November 30, 2009 | Gainesville | United States | O'Connell Center |
| December 1, 2009 | Tallahassee | United States | Tallahassee–Leon County Civic Center |
| December 2, 2009 | Pensacola | United States | Pensacola Civic Center |
| December 4, 2009 | Birmginham | United States | BJCC Arena |
| December 5, 2009 | Louisville | United States | Broadbent Arena |
| December 7, 2009 | Tupelo | United States | BancorpSouth Arena |
| December 8, 2009 | Bossier City | United States | CenturyTel Center |
| December 9, 2009 | Lafayette | United States | Cajundome |
| December 11, 2009 | Corpus Christi | United States | American Bank Center Arena |
| December 12, 2009 | San Antonio | United States | Freeman Coliseum |
| December 13, 2009 | Austin | United States | Frank Erwin Center |
| December 15, 2009 | Tulsa | United States | BOK Center |
| December 16, 2009 | Jonesboro | United States | Convocation Center |
| December 18, 2009 | North Little Rock | United States | Verizon Arena |
| December 19, 2009 | Southaven | United States | DeSoto Civic Center |
| December 20, 2009 | Evansville | United States | Roberts Municipal Stadium |
Europe Leg 1
| January 17, 2010 | Liverpool | England | Echo Arena Liverpool |
| January 19, 2010 | London | England | Wembley Arena |
| January 21, 2010 | Basel | Switzerland | St. Jakobshalle |
| January 26, 2010 | Mannheim | Germany | SAP Arena |
| January 27, 2010 | Esch-sur-Alzette | Luxembourg | Rockhal |
| January 29, 2010 | Oberhausen | Germany | König Pilsener Arena |
| January 30, 2010 | Munich | Germany | Olympiahalle |
| February 1, 2010 | Hamburg | Germany | Color Line Arena |
Asia
| February 5, 2010 | Dubai | United Arab Emirates | Dubai Festival City |
North America Leg 2
| March 18, 2010 | Baltimore | United States | 1st Mariner Arena |
| March 20, 2010 | Boston | United States | Agganis Arena |
| March 21, 2010 | Newark | United States | Prudential Center |
| March 23, 2010 | Syracuse | United States | Onondaga County War Memorial |
| March 26, 2010 | Uniondale | United States | Nassau Coliseum |
| March 27, 2010 | Ledyard | United States | MGM Grand at Foxwoods |
| March 28, 2010 | Albany | United States | Times Union Center |
| March 31, 2010 | University Park | United States | Bryce Jordan Center |
| April 1, 2010 | Cleveland | United States | Wolstein Center |
| April 6, 2010 | St. Louis | United States | Chaifetz Arena |
| April 7, 2010 | Milwaukee | United States | U.S. Cellular Arena |
| April 9, 2010 | Columbus | United States | Value City Arena |
| April 10, 2010 | Detroit | United States | Joe Louis Arena |
| April 18, 2010 | Champaign | United States | Assembly Hall |
| April 20, 2010 | Broomfield | United States | 1stBank Center |
| April 22, 2010 | West Valley City | United States | Maverik Center |
| April 23, 2010 | Nampa | United States | Idaho Center |
| April 24, 2010 | Reno | United States | Reno Events Center |
| April 26, 2010 | Fresno | United States | Save Mart Center |
| April 28, 2010 | Glendale | United States | Jobing.com Arena |
| April 29, 2010 | Las Vegas | United States | Orleans Arena |
| May 1, 2010 | San Diego | United States | San Diego Sports Arena |
| May 3, 2010 | Los Angeles | United States | Nokia Theatre |
| May 4, 2010 | Bakersfield | United States | Rabobank Arena |
| May 6, 2010 | San Jose | United States | HP Pavilion at San Jose |
| May 7, 2010 | Sacramento | United States | ARCO Arena |
| May 9, 2010 | Seattle | United States | WaMu Theater |
| May 10, 2010 | Yakima | United States | Yakima SunDome |
| May 13, 2010 | Edmonton | Canada | Rexall Place |
| May 14, 2010 | Saskatoon | Canada | Credit Union Centre |
| May 15, 2010 | Regina | Canada | Brandt Centre |
| May 17, 2010 | Winnipeg | Canada | MTS Centre |
| May 19, 2010 | Minneapolis | United States | Target Center |
| May 21, 2010 | Green Bay | United States | Resch Center |
| May 22, 2010 | Rockford | United States | Rockford MetroCentre |
| May 24, 2010 | Wichita | United States | Intrust Bank Arena |
| May 25, 2010 | Kansas City | United States | Sprint Center |
| May 27, 2010 | Hoffman Estates | United States | Sears Centre |
| May 28, 2010 | Grand Rapids | United States | Van Andel Arena |
| May 30, 2010 | Nashville | United States | Bridgestone Arena |
| June 2, 2010 | Pittsburgh | United States | Petersen Events Center |
| June 3, 2010 | Pikeville | United States | Eastern Kentucky Expo Center |
| June 5, 2010 | Duluth | United States | Arena at Gwinnett Center |
| June 6, 2010 | North Charleston | United States | North Charleston Coliseum |
| June 8, 2010 | Clemson | United States | Littlejohn Coliseum |
| June 9, 2010 | Augusta | United States | James Brown Arena |
| June 11, 2010 | Charlotte | United States | Time Warner Cable Arena |
| June 12, 2010 | Hampton | United States | Hampton Coliseum |
| June 14, 2010 | Amherst | United States | Mullins Center |
| June 15, 2010 | Manchester | United States | Verizon Wireless Arena |
| June 17, 2010 | Portland | United States | Cumberland County Civic Center |
| June 19, 2010 | Rochester | United States | Blue Cross Arena |
| June 20, 2010 | Trenton | United States | Sun National Bank Center |
| July 15, 2010 | Cadott | United States | Chippewa Valley |
| July 23, 2010 | Halifax | Canada | Halifax Regional Municipality |
| August 6, 2010 | Hershey | United States | Star Pavilion |
| August 7, 2010 | Atlantic City | United States | Tropicana Showroom |
Europe Leg 2
| October 4, 2010 | Berlin | Germany | Columbia Club |
| October 5, 2010 | Hamburg | Germany | Gruenspan |
| October 7, 2010 | Stockholm | Sweden | Debaser Medis |
| October 9, 2010 | Cologne | Germany | Live Music Hall |
| October 10, 2010 | Munich | Germany | Theaterfabrik |
| October 11, 2010 | Zürich | Switzerland | Volkhaus |
| October 13, 2010 | London | England | KOKO |
South Africa
| October 27, 2010 | Cape Town | South Africa | Grand Arena |
| October 29, 2010 | Johannesburg | South Africa | Coca-Cola Dome |

== Personnel ==
- Chris Daughtry – lead vocals, guitar
- Josh Steely – lead guitar, backing vocals
- Brian Craddock – rhythm guitar, backing vocals
- Josh Paul – bass, backing vocals
- Joey Barnes – drums, percussion, keyboard, backing vocals )Left the band halfway through the tour)
- Robin Diaz – drums (Replaced Barnes)
