= It's Not Over...The Hits So Far =

Greatest hits album by Daughtry
- Released: February 12, 2016
- Recorded: 2006–15
- Genre: Rock
- Length: 50:12
- Label: RCA; 19
- Producer: Howard Benson; Martin Johnson

Daughtry chronology
| Baptized (2013) | It's Not Over...The Hits So Far (2016) | Cage to Rattle (2018) |

Singles from It's Not Over...The Hits So Far
- 1. "Torches" Released: January 29, 2016

It's Not Over...The Hits So Far is the first greatest hits album by American rock band Daughtry. The album features most of the mainstream singles released from the band's first four studio albums, with two new songs. "Torches" was released on January 29, 2016, as the compilation's lead single. The cover art is an edited version of the back cover art from Baptized and also does not feature Robin Diaz, who left after that album's release.

== Background ==
The album features two original songs, "Torches" and "Go Down", with the former being released as the album's lead single. Frontman Chris Daughtry spoke with Entertainment Weekly about "Torches," saying

It took a long time to get to the two songs that we felt were a nice introduction to where this next record may go. “Torches” was an instant favorite at the label. I love working with Dave [Bassett] and I finally got to go out to his house in Malibu, which is the most beautiful setting to write at. You look off his balcony and you see the ocean and the mountains and it’s gorgeous. I was looking at all the dry brush talking about how if someone flicked a cigarette or something the whole place would just go down. It got me thinking about how fire spreads. We were talking about all the bulls— on the Internet and how people just hate on stuff. We were saying, “What if we used that energy to spread positivity? Would it spread as fast as the hate does?” “All the hate and lies around us like an ember in the brush”: It just started writing itself from everything we were talking about. I think it’s a message that we all need to hear. None of us are impervious to being negative. It’s easier to complain about what’s wrong than it is to talk about what’s going right. We’re all a part of this, whether we want to believe it or not — why don’t we try shining some light in the darkness?

Daughtry then explained the second song "Go Down", saying

We were like, “You know what, we already know we’re bringing guitars back on this next record, so why not put it on the greatest hits. Who cares if it goes to radio, this is for the fans.” It’s about letting loose and not really giving a crap. Just… get your freak on. It’s got kind of an indie, heavy alternative vibe. It’s definitely heavy, but it’s got this danceability to it. Almost a little bit of Garbage in there — the band, not the trash.

== Track listing ==
It's Not Over...The Hits So Far – Standard edition
| No. | Title | Writer(s) | Length |
|---|---|---|---|
| 1. | "It's Not Over" (from Daughtry) | Chris Daughtry, Greg Wattenberg, Mark Wilkerson, Brett Young | 3:34 |
| 2. | "Home" (from Daughtry) | Daughtry | 4:15 |
| 3. | "Over You" (from Daughtry) | Daughtry, Brian Howes | 3:24 |
| 4. | "What About Now" (from Daughtry) | Ben Moody, David Hodges, Joshua Hartzler | 4:10 |
| 5. | "Feels Like Tonight" (from Daughtry) | Max Martin, Luke Gottwald, Shep Solomon | 3:58 |
| 6. | "No Surprise" (from Leave This Town) | Daughtry, Chad Kroeger, Eric Dill, Rune Westburg, Joey Moi | 4:29 |
| 7. | "September" (from Leave This Town) | Daughtry, Josh Steely | 4:00 |
| 8. | "Life After You" (from Leave This Town) | Daughtry, Kroeger, Moi, Brett James | 3:26 |
| 9. | "Crawling Back to You" (from Break the Spell) | Daughtry, Marti Frederiksen | 3:45 |
| 10. | "Waiting for Superman" (from Baptized) | Daughtry, Martin Johnson, Sam Hollander | 4:27 |
| 11. | "Long Live Rock & Roll" (from Baptized) | Daughtry, Johnson, Hollander | 3:36 |
| 12. | "Torches" | Daughtry, Dave Bassett | 3:32 |
| 13. | "Go Down" | Daughtry, Bassett | 3:26 |

Acoustic Live – 2015 – deluxe edition (Disc two)
| No. | Title | Writer(s) | Length |
|---|---|---|---|
| 1. | "Baptized" (from Baptized) | Daughtry, Johnson, John Lardieri, Claude Kelly | 4:04 |
| 2. | "Crawling Back to You" (from Break the Spell) | Daughtry, Frederiksen | 3:41 |
| 3. | "Crazy" (from Break the Spell) | Daughtry, Elvio Fernandes, Greg Wiktorski | 3:27 |
| 4. | "Tennessee Line" (from Leave This Town) | Daughtry, Brian Craddock | 4:25 |
| 5. | "It's Not Over" (from Daughtry) | Daughtry, Wattenberg, Wilkerson, Young | 3:42 |
| 6. | "Life After You" (from Leave This Town) | Daughtry, Kroeger, Moi, James | 3:58 |
| 7. | "Who's They" (from Break the Spell) | Daughtry | 5:01 |
| 8. | "Gone Too Soon" (from Break the Spell) | Daughtry, busbee | 4:02 |
| 9. | "September" (from Leave This Town) | Daughtry, Steely | 4:05 |
| 10. | "Home" (from Daughtry) | Daughtry | 4:25 |
| 11. | "Waiting for Superman" (from Baptized) | Daughtry, Johnson, Hollander | 5:00 |
| 12. | "18 Years" (from Baptized) | Daughtry, Johnson, Hollander | 4:58 |

== Charts ==
| Chart (2016) | Peak position |
|---|---|
| Canadian Albums (Billboard) | 95 |
| UK Albums (OCC) | 88 |
| US Billboard 200 | 43 |
| US Top Rock Albums (Billboard) | 6 |

== Certifications ==
Certifications for It's Not Over...The Hits So Far
| Region | Certification | Certified units/sales |
|---|---|---|
| United Kingdom (BPI) | Silver | 60,000^{‡} |
^{‡} Sales+streaming figures based on certification alone.

== Band members ==
- Chris Daughtry – vocals, guitar
- Josh Paul – bass
- Josh Steely – guitar
- Brian Craddock – guitar
- Brandon Maclin – drums (12–13)
- Elvio Fernandes – keyboards, guitar (tracks 10–13)
- Joey Barnes – drums (tracks 1–8)
- Jeremy Brady – guitar (tracks 1–5)
- Robin Diaz – drums tracks (7,9–11)

== Release history ==
| Region | Date | Label | Format | Edition(s) | Catalog |
|---|---|---|---|---|---|
| United States | February 12, 2016 | RCA; 19 | CD; Digital download | Standard; Deluxe | 88875196862 |
