= List of Billboard Adult Top 40 number-one songs of the 2000s =

Songs that reached number one on the Billboard Adult Top 40 chart during the 2000s, listed in chronological order. The top song of 2000, "Smooth", spent a record 25 weeks at number one on the chart beginning in October 1999 and continuing through April 2000.

== Chart history ==
Issue date	Song	Artist	Weeks at number one	Ref.
2000
October 23	"Smooth"	Santana featuring Rob Thomas	25	
April 15	"Everything You Want"	Vertical Horizon	1	
April 22	"Breathe"	Faith Hill	1	
April 29	"Everything You Want"	Vertical Horizon	13	
July 29	"Bent"	Matchbox Twenty	13	
October 28	"With Arms Wide Open"	Creed	8	
December 23	"If You're Gone"	Matchbox Twenty	13	
2001
March 24	"Thank You"	Dido	9	
May 26	"Follow Me"	Uncle Kracker	4	
June 23	"Hanging by a Moment"	Lifehouse	1	
June 30	"Drops of Jupiter (Tell Me)"	Train	1	
July 7	"Hanging by a Moment"	Lifehouse	3	
July 28	"Drops of Jupiter (Tell Me)"	Train	9	
September 29	"Hanging by a Moment"	Lifehouse	1	
October 6	"Drops of Jupiter (Tell Me)"	Train	4	
November 3	"Only Time"	Enya	4	
December 1	"Superman (It's Not Easy)"	Five for Fighting	3	
December 22	"Wherever You Will Go"	The Calling	23	
2002
June 1	"Soak Up the Sun"	Sheryl Crow	9	
August 3	"Complicated"	Avril Lavigne	16	
November 23	"The Game of Love"	Santana featuring Michelle Branch	13	
2003
February 22	"I'm with You"	Avril Lavigne	10	
May 3	"Unwell"	Matchbox Twenty	18	
September 6	"Calling All Angels"	Train	5	
October 11	"Why Don't You & I"	Santana featuring Alex Band	9	
December 13	"Here Without You"	3 Doors Down	13	
2004
March 13	"The First Cut Is the Deepest"	Sheryl Crow	1	
March 20	"Someday"	Nickelback	1	
March 27	"My Immortal"	Evanescence	3	
April 17	"This Love"	Maroon 5	13	
July 17	"The Reason"	Hoobastank	10	
September 25	"She Will Be Loved"	Maroon 5	13	
December 25	"Daughters"	John Mayer	1	
2005
January 1	"Give a Little Bit"	Goo Goo Dolls	8	
February 26	"Boulevard of Broken Dreams"	Green Day	11	
May 14	"Lonely No More"	Rob Thomas	10	
July 23	"You and Me"	Lifehouse	5	
August 27	"Behind These Hazel Eyes"	Kelly Clarkson	5	
October 1	"You and Me"	Lifehouse	4	
October 29	"Photograph"	Nickelback	18	
2006
March 4	"You're Beautiful"	James Blunt	5	
April 8	"Bad Day"	Daniel Powter	12	
July 1	"Black Horse and the Cherry Tree"	KT Tunstall	10	
September 9	"Crazy"	Gnarls Barkley	3	
September 30	"Far Away"	Nickelback	5	
November 4	"How to Save a Life"	The Fray	15	
2007
February 17	"Chasing Cars"	Snow Patrol	2	
March 3	"It's Not Over"	Daughtry	9	
May 5	"If Everyone Cared"	Nickelback	6	
June 16	"Home"	Daughtry	10	
August 25	"Hey There Delilah"	Plain White T's	2	
September 8	"Big Girls Don't Cry"	Fergie	7	
October 27	"Who Knew"	Pink	1	
November 3	"Bubbly"	Colbie Caillat	13	
2008
February 2	"Apologize"	Timbaland featuring OneRepublic	6	
March 15	"Love Song"	Sara Bareilles	9	
May 17	"Feels Like Tonight"	Daughtry	3	
June 7	"Bleeding Love"	Leona Lewis	10	
August 16	"It's Not My Time"	3 Doors Down	1	
August 23	"Viva la Vida"	Coldplay	1	
August 30	"It's Not My Time"	3 Doors Down	2	
September 13	"Viva la Vida"	Coldplay	5	
October 18	"I'm Yours"	Jason Mraz	9	
December 20	"So What"	Pink	1	
December 27	"Hot n Cold"	Katy Perry	4	
2009
January 24	"Gotta Be Somebody"	Nickelback	5	
February 28	"You Found Me"	The Fray	7	
April 18	"Sober"	Pink	1	
April 25	"You Found Me"	The Fray	4	
May 23	"Gives You Hell"	The All-American Rejects	3	
June 13	"You Found Me"	The Fray	1	
June 20	"Second Chance"	Shinedown	7	
August 8	"Her Diamonds"	Rob Thomas	4	
September 5	"No Surprise"	Daughtry	2	
September 19	"Use Somebody"	Kings of Leon	11	
December 5	"Already Gone"	Kelly Clarkson	8	

== See also ==
- 2000s in music
