= Cage to Rattle =

Studio album by Daughtry
- Released: July 27, 2018
- Recorded: April 2016 – May 2018
- Studio: Blackbird (Nashville, Tennessee)
- Genre: Pop rock
- Length: 38:17
- Label: RCA
- Producer: Jacquire King

Daughtry chronology
It's Not Over...The Hits So Far (2016)	Cage to Rattle (2018)	Dearly Beloved (2021)

Singles from Cage to Rattle
- 1. "Deep End" Released: June 5, 2018; 2. "As You Are" Released: June 5, 2019

Cage to Rattle is the fifth studio album by American rock band Daughtry, released on July 27, 2018, through RCA Records. This is their first studio album in five years since Baptized in 2013. At just ten songs, this album is Daughtry's shortest album to date. It is also their first album with drummer Brandon Maclin. Upon its release the album received mixed reviews from music critics, with some calling it the group's strongest and most mature work. This was Daughtry's last album to be released on RCA Records.

== Background ==
Daughtry began recording the album back in April 2016 at the Blackbird Studio in Nashville, Tennessee and concluded in May 2018.

Daughtry said about the album, "Cage to Rattle has been the most fun yet most challenging album we've ever made. It's a musical stew we've been cooking up for more than 2 years and we can't wait to satisfy the appetites of our amazing fans who've been patiently waiting for this record!".

== Singles ==
"Deep End" is the first single and was released on June 5, 2018. "As You Are" was the second single and was released on June 5, 2019, as a celebrations of Pride Month.

== Reception ==
Professional ratings
Review scores
Source	Rating
AllMusic	3.5/5 stars
Belfast Telegraph	6/10
The Independent	2/5 stars
Newsday	3/4 stars
Planetmosh	4/5 stars

The album received mixed reviews from critics. AllMusic's Stephen Thomas Erlewine wrote that the album showed the band moving away from their previous hard rock style to encompass a more mellow stance. Erlewine wrote that the few "rock signifiers" used by Daughtry were "in service to an album that is otherwise adult alternative easy listening."

== Charts and performance ==
Cage to Rattle debuted at number 10 on the US Billboard 200 with 26,000 album-equivalent units, of which 24,000 were pure album sales. It is Daughtry's fifth US top 10 album.

In the United Kingdom, Cage to Rattle debuted at number 14 on the UK Albums Chart, becoming Daughtry's second highest debut in the UK, just behind their self-titled debut album that opened at number 13 in 2006. Cage to Rattle sold 3,758 units in its first week.

In Scotland, Cage to Rattle opened at number eight, which is Daughtry's highest debut in the country.

== Track listing ==
Cage to Rattle track listing
No.	Title	Writer(s)	Producer(s)	Length
1.	"Just Found Heaven"	Chris Daughtry; Elvio Fernandes; Dave Bassett	Jacquire King	4:14
2.	"Backbone"	Daughtry; Marti Frederiksen; Scott Stevens	King	3:01
3.	"Deep End"	Daughtry; Julie Frost; Tom Liljegren; Alexander Ryberg	King	3:51
4.	"As You Are"	Daughtry; Deanna Daughtry	King	3:45
5.	"Death of Me"	Daughtry; Stevens	King	3:35
6.	"Bad Habits"	Daughtry; Brian Craddock; Mark Holman	King	3:30
7.	"Back in Time"	Daughtry; Frederiksen; Josh Paul	King	4:12
8.	"Gravity"	Rob Persaud; Dewain Whitmore Jr.; Brian Kennedy	King	3:47
9.	"Stuff of Legends"	Daughtry; Stevens	King	3:50
10.	"White Flag"	Daughtry; Stevens	King	4:52
Total length:				38:17

Walmart edition bonus tracks
No.	Title	Writer(s)	Length
11.	"Just Found Heaven" (live)	Daughtry; Fernandes; Bassett	4:52
12.	"Back in Time" (live)	Daughtry; Frederiksen; Paul	4:21
13.	"Home" (live)	Daughtry	5:12
Total length:			52:59

== Personnel ==
Daughtry

- Chris Daughtry – vocals, guitar
- Josh Steely – guitar
- Brian Craddock – guitar
- Josh Paul – bass
- Elvio Fernandes – keyboards, backing vocals
- Brandon Maclin – drums

Additional personnel

- Chris Daughtry – composition
- Josh Paul – composition
- Brian Craddock – composition
- Elvio Fernandes – composition
- Kevin Boettger – assistant engineering
- Chris Bellman – mastering
- Martin Cooke – assistant mixing
- Rich Costey – mixing (tracks: 3 & 7)
- Eric Darken – additional percussion, programming
- Christopher Feldmann – art direction, design
- Luke Forehand – assistant engineering
- Nicolas Fournier – assistant mixing
- Matthew Glasbey – assistant mixing
- Chad Howat – additional keyboards, programming
- Jacquire King – production
- Kolton Lee – engineering
- Jason Mott – assistant engineering
- Danny Pellegrini – assistant engineering
- Lowell Reynolds – engineering
- Andrew Scheps – mixing (tracks: 1, 2, 4, 5, 6, 8, 9, 10)
- Spencer Thomson – additional guitars, keyboards, programming

== Charts ==
Chart performance for Cage to Rattle
Chart (2018)	Peak position
Australian Albums (ARIA)	40
Austrian Albums (Ö3 Austria)	37
Belgian Albums (Ultratop Flanders)	189
Canadian Albums (Billboard)	40
Dutch Albums (Album Top 100)	154
German Albums (Offizielle Top 100)	37
Scottish Albums (Official Charts)	8
Swiss Albums (Schweizer Hitparade)	8
UK Albums (Official Charts)	14
US Billboard 200	10
