= Torches (song) =

Single by Daughtry

from the album It's Not Over...The Hits So Far
- Released: January 29, 2016
- Genre: Pop rock
- Length: 3:32
- Label: RCA
- Songwriter(s): Chris Daughtry; Dave Bassett
- Producer(s): Dave Bassett

Daughtry singles chronology
"Battleships" (2014)	"Torches" (2016)	"Deep End" (2018)

"Torches" is a song recorded by American rock band Daughtry for their first greatest hits album, It's Not Over...The Hits So Far (2016). Written by lead singer Chris Daughtry with Dave Bassett, it is one of two new tracks recorded for the compilation. It was released January 29, 2016 via RCA Records as the album's lead single.

== Composition ==
"Torches" is song written by Chris Daughtry and Dave Bassett that addresses negativity in the world and how to combat it through spreading kindness like a fire. Driven by guitar and an anthemic chorus, the song represents a conscious return to the rock-oriented sound of the band's first three albums in light of the lukewarm reception to the pop-style production of previous album, Baptized (2013). Daughtry described the sound as "a hybrid of where we've been and where we are going."

== Chart performance ==
Chart (2016)	Peak position
Canada AC (Billboard)	37
US Adult Pop Airplay (Billboard)	40

== Release history ==
Country	Date	Format	Label	Ref.
Worldwide	January 29, 2016	Digital download	RCA	
United States	February 22, 2016	Hot adult contemporary	RCA	
