= Crashed =

Single by Daughtry

from the album Daughtry
- Released: September 5, 2007
- Recorded: 2006
- Genre: Rock
- Length: 3:31
- Label: RCA; 19
- Songwriters: Chris Daughtry; Nina Ossoff; Dana Calitri; Kathy Sommer
- Producer: Howard Benson

Daughtry singles chronology
"Over You" (2007)	"Crashed" (2007)	"Feels Like Tonight" (2008)

"Crashed" is a song recorded by American rock band Daughtry. Co-written by the band's frontman Chris Daughtry, it was the band's third single serviced exclusively to U.S. rock stations on September 5, 2007, and was the fifth single overall from the band's self-titled debut album (2006). Upon its release the song got adds at those stations, along with some Alternative and Top 40 stations.

In 2026, the band released a re-recorded version of the song as part of their album There And Back Again.

== Music video ==
Like "What I Want" it did not have an official video, since the band made one for the main third single, "Over You" instead. It did however have an unofficial promo video that mixes black and white scenes of the band performing with clips from the ACC and SEC College Football season, which the song was used to open. This video can be viewed here.

== Song usage and live performances ==
The song, as mentioned, has been used to open the ACC and SEC College Football season and has been the opening number for the band's shows. In the United States, it was used in the Lego Bionicle advertisements featuring sets named "Toa Mahri".

They recently performed the track at the Rock And Roll 400, as well as on Late Show with David Letterman.

== Chart performance ==
The song debuted on the Mainstream Rock chart for the week of October 6, 2007 at number 35, and peaked at number 24 on the chart.

Chart (2007–2008)	Peak position
Canada Rock (Billboard)	35
US Mainstream Rock (Billboard)	24
