= What I Want (Daughtry song) =

Single by Daughtry featuring Slash

from the album Daughtry
- Released: April 23, 2007
- Recorded: 2006
- Genre: Rock
- Length: 2:48
- Label: RCA; 19
- Songwriters: Chris Daughtry; Brian Howes
- Producer: Howard Benson

Daughtry singles chronology
"Home" (2007)	"What I Want" (2007)	"Over You" (2007)

Slash singles chronology
"What I Want" (2007)	"Sahara" (2009)

Audio video
- "What I Want" on YouTube

"What I Want" is a song recorded by American rock band Daughtry for their self titled debut album (2007). It was released to rock radio in the United States on April 23, 2007 as the second US rock single and third overall single from the album. The song features Guns N' Roses lead guitarist Slash on guitar, earning him his first featured artist credit on a song.

The band opted to release the track to rock radio only, because their second single, "Home", was not being played on rock stations due to its lighter sound. Since the band had had success on the format with their first single, "It's Not Over", they wanted to follow the song up, so they opted to release "What I Want". Since this was not a full single release, a music video for the song was not made.

"What I Want" is also featured as one of the songs on the Guitar Hero: On Tour game for the Nintendo DS.

In 2026, the band re-recorded the song for the compilation There and Back Again with Steve Perreira replacing Slash as the lead guitarist in this version.

== Composition ==
"What I Want" is a rock song written by Chris Daughtry and Brian Howes and was one of the first tracks written for the Daughtry album. According to the digital sheet music published at Musicnotes.com by Universal Music Publishing Group, "What I Want" was originally composed in the key of E major and set to a "driving rock" tempo of 140 BPM. Daughtry's vocals range from F♯_{4} – B#_{5}.

== Charts ==
=== Weekly charts ===
Weekly chart performance for "What I Want"
Chart (2007)	Peak position
Canada Hot 100 (Billboard)	93
Canada Rock (Billboard)	7
US Mainstream Rock Airplay (Billboard)	6

=== Year-end charts ===
Year-end chart performance for "What I Want"
Chart (2007)	Position
US Mainstream Rock Songs (Billboard)	26
