= What About Now (Daughtry song) =

2008 single by Daughtry

Single by Daughtry

from the album Daughtry
- Released: July 1, 2008
- Recorded: 2006
- Genre: Alternative rock; pop rock
- Length: 4:10
- Label: RCA; 19; Epic
- Songwriters: Ben Moody; David Hodges; Josh Hartzler
- Producer: Howard Benson

Daughtry singles chronology
"Feels Like Tonight" (2008)	"What About Now" (2008)	"No Surprise" (2009)

Music video
- "What About Now" on YouTube

"What About Now" is the seventh single from American rock band Daughtry's self-titled debut album. The song is a ballad, written by Ben Moody, David Hodges (both former members of Evanescence), and Josh Hartzler, who is married to Amy Lee (the lead singer of Evanescence). It is one of only two songs on the album not at least co-written by Chris Daughtry. The song was announced as the band's next single on their website. It was officially released in the U.S. on July 1, 2008.

A year later, pop group Westlife released a version of the song that reached No. 2 in the Irish Singles Chart and UK Singles Chart. Westlife's official music video is marked as the last film the large part Vatnajökull Glacier in Iceland was seen in because of the distortion caused by a subsequent volcanic eruption.

== Music video ==
The music video, directed by Kevin Kerslake, premiered Friday July 11, 2008 on FNMTV Premieres, where it got a standing ovation at FNMTV Studio. The video can now be viewed on the band's official site.

The video is a social commentary, depicting several people and places affected by poverty, natural disasters, war, and other world issues. Several comments are made about these issues, and the video also asks introspective questions to the viewer. Certain people who are working to help these problems are shown throughout the video, with their names and what they're associated with listed. The video features a light bulb that has yet to burn out, which symbolizes that it's still possible to make a difference. The video concludes with one final question to the viewer, "What About Now?", shown next to the burning light bulb. A few shots of the band playing the song live are also shown in the video.

== Song usage ==
The song was used on the February 21, 2008 episode of the seventh season of American Idol, in a video package showcasing the season's top 24. An acoustic version of the song was performed by the band on a trip to Uganda, Africa in aid of the April 9, 2008 telecast of the fund raising charity event Idol Gives Back. The band performed in a small village surrounded by a group of underprivileged children that were heard singing along at one point, while a video also showed scenes of the band's trip.

The song was used in various episodes of The X Factor in 2009, I'm a Celebrity... Get Me Out Of Here! 2009 and Britain's Got Talent 2010. Both Daughtry's and Westlife's version were used.

On December 11, 2009, it was performed at the 2009 Nobel Peace Prize concert in honor of US President Barack Obama by the Irish pop band Westlife.

== Release history ==
Region	Date	Format
United States	July 1, 2008	CD; digital download
United Kingdom	October 2009	CD; digital download

== Chart performance ==
Raising money for Idol Gives Back, the acoustic performance of "What About Now" was put onto iTunes and debuted at number eight on the Billboard Hot Digital Songs chart, fueling a number eighteen debut on Billboard's Hot 100, the band's highest debuting song to date, as well as their fourth top twenty Hot 100 hit. It also entered at number seventeen on the Canadian Hot 100, giving the band their fourth top twenty hit there as well. It achieved these peaks over two months before the song's official release.

Following "What About Now"'s official release, the song has become the band's fifth consecutive top ten hit on the Adult Top 40, so far reaching number three. This is an all-time record for the most top ten hits from a debut album on the Adult Top 40 chart. This also ties the album with Kelly Clarkson's Breakaway and Nickelback's All the Right Reasons for the most Adult Top 40 top tens from any album. On the Hot Adult Contemporary Tracks, the song peaked at number three. It is their third top ten hit on the chart, making them the only rock band to ever have three top tens from one album on the chart. The song also entered the top twenty on Mainstream Top 40 radio, peaking at number nineteen in October 2008, their fifth consecutive top twenty hit on the format. As such, the song re-entered the Hot 100 at number 94 on the chart week of September 6, 2008, and climbed to number 29 upon its re-entry.

The song entered the UK Singles Chart in May 2009 after being featured during a montage on Britain's Got Talent, and in August 2009 re-entered after being featured during the premiere of the sixth season of The X Factor.

On October 4, 2009, Daughtry re-entered the UK Singles Chart top 40 again at number 39, due to Westlife's version being released.

== Charts ==
=== Weekly charts ===
Chart (2008–2009)	Peak position
Canada Hot 100 (Billboard)	17
Canada AC (Billboard)	3
Canada CHR/Top 40 (Billboard)	43
Canada Hot AC (Billboard)	11
Ireland (IRMA)	30
Scottish Singles Sales (Official Charts)	9
UK Singles (Official Charts)	11
US Billboard Hot 100	18
US Adult Contemporary (Billboard)	3
US Adult Pop Airplay (Billboard)	3
US Pop Airplay (Billboard)	19

=== Year end charts ===
Chart (2008)	Position
US Adult Top 40 (Billboard)	21

Chart (2009)	Position
US Adult Contemporary (Billboard)	4
US Adult Top 40 (Billboard)	25

== Westlife version ==
"What About Now"

Single by Westlife

from the album Where We Are
- Released: October 23, 2009
- Recorded: 2008
- Genre: Pop
- Length: 4:11
- Label: Syco
- Songwriters: Ben Moody; David Hodges; Josh Hartzler
- Producer: Steve Robson

Westlife singles chronology
"Something Right" (2008)	"What About Now" (2009)	"Everybody Hurts" (2010)

Music video
- "What About Now" on YouTube

"What About Now" (titled as "What About Now / You Raise Me Up" on Amazon UK) was covered by Irish boy band Westlife for their ninth studio album Where We Are (2009) and it was released as the album's lead single on October 23, 2009. This song would go on to be the only single released from that album. Steve Robson retooled the original version of the song and serves as the producer for the Westlife version. It was composed in the traditional verse–chorus form in A minor, with Filan and Feehily's vocal ranging from the chords of B_{3} to G_{5}. The single officially sold over 270,000 copies in UK thus far and eleventh highest single sales of the band.

On October 25, 2009, the group appeared on The X Factor to perform and for a brief interview on spin-off show The Xtra Factor. The group also performed the following day on GMTV with an interview and webchat to follow before appearing on October 30 on The One Show for an interview. On November 27, Westlife performed "What About Now" on The Late Late Toy Show. They also performed the song on Nobel Peace Prize 2009.

Westlife was recently asked by Daily Star about the success of the song for the band. Egan stated: "It is amazing that after 11 albums we can still do things we haven't done before, or set new records for ourselves. "What About Now" definitely changed things. It might not have sold millions of copies, but I was on YouTube yesterday and the video has almost two million plays or something. That's not just me watching it either! I think it shows that we can still reach new people and audiences with everything we do".

After the band split in 2012, band member Shane Filan made a solo acoustic and live performances of the song. It is the band's tenth most streamed song, ninth best-selling single in paid-for sales category and eighth best-selling single combined sales category in the United Kingdom as of January 2019.

=== Chart performance ===
In the first week of its release, Westlife's cover of "What About Now" reached number two in the Irish Singles Chart, taking the place of Alexandra Burke's "Bad Boys" and only beaten by Cheryl Cole's "Fight for This Love" which spent a second week at the number one position. A-listed on BBC Radio 2, their version peaked at number four on the UK Downloads Chart, number six on UK Radio Airplay Chart, number two on Scottish charts and number twenty-two on UK TV Airplay Chart or Digital Subscription Plays Chart.

=== Weekly charts ===
Chart (2009)	Peak position
Euro Digital Tracks (Billboard)	5
Ireland (IRMA)	2
Ireland Digital Tracks (Billboard)	2
Ireland Download (GfK Chart-Track)	2
Russia Airplay (TopHit)	95
Scottish Singles Sales (Official Charts)	2
South Korea (Gaon International Digital Chart)	35
Sweden (Sverigetopplistan)	13
UK Singles (Official Charts)	2
UK Airplay (Music Week)	6
UK Digital Tracks (Billboard)	4

=== Year-end charts ===
Chart (2009)	Position
UK Singles (OCC)	85
Chart (2010)	Position
Taiwan (Hito Radio)	18
UK Airplay (Music Week)	53

=== Certifications ===
Certifications for What About Now
Region	Certification	Certified units/sales
United Kingdom (BPI)	Platinum	600,000^{‡}
^{‡} Sales+streaming figures based on certification alone.

=== Reception ===
Professional ratings
Review scores
Source	Rating
BBC	3/5 stars
Digital Spy	3/5 stars
MusicRiot	4/5 stars
Female First	3/5 stars

The song has received mixed reviews. Nick Levine from Digital Spy commented that: "Their version for the "Daughtry song" is no great reinvention, adding a lick of extra pop gloss to the manly balladry of the original. The strings swell like Louis Walsh's bank balance, the chorus is as big and stirring as Goliath's sugar spoon, and the boys deliver every line with their usual note-perfect earnestness. Cynical and predictable? Oh yes, but this is ruthlessly effective too".

=== Music video ===
UK's The Mirror released an article about the shooting of their music video on October 26, 2009. The article described it: "I was listening to the song and it spontaneously came into my head that it would be nice to film it in front of ice. If you remember Die Another Day, the Bond film, it's like the contrast of the ice and the really modern things like the sexy, fashionable clothing and cars". The full video was released on the band's official website and UK music channels on November 6, 2009. It was directed by Philip Andelman and filmed on location near Jökulsárlón at the Vatnajökull Glacier in Iceland, the biggest in Europe. The video shows a snowy setting with different sceneries in ice and northern lights or the aurora borealis in the resolution of the video. Feehily later said on his official blog that the actual location of the music video was already distorted because of a subsequent volcanic eruption in Iceland. Feehily also had the idea of taking the video on that location. The video was uploaded on YouTube on 2011 and had more than 12 million views as of September 2018.

=== Track listing ===
1. "What About Now" – 4:11
2. "You Raise Me Up" (live at Croke Park) – 5:00

=== Release history ===
Region	Date	Format	Label
Ireland	October 23, 2009	CD; digital download	RCA
United Kingdom	October 25, 2009	Digital download	Syco; RCA
United Kingdom	October 26, 2009	CD single	Syco; RCA
Germany	October 27, 2009	Digital download	Sony
Sweden	October 28, 2009	Digital download	Sony
New Zealand	November 18, 2009	Digital download	Sony
Hong Kong	November 26, 2009	Digital download	Sony

=== Tours performed at ===
- Where We Are Tour (2010)
- Gravity Tour (2011)
- Greatest Hits/Farewell Tour (2012)
- The Twenty Tour (2019)
- The Wild Dreams Tour (2022–2023)
