= Daughtry (band) =

American rock band

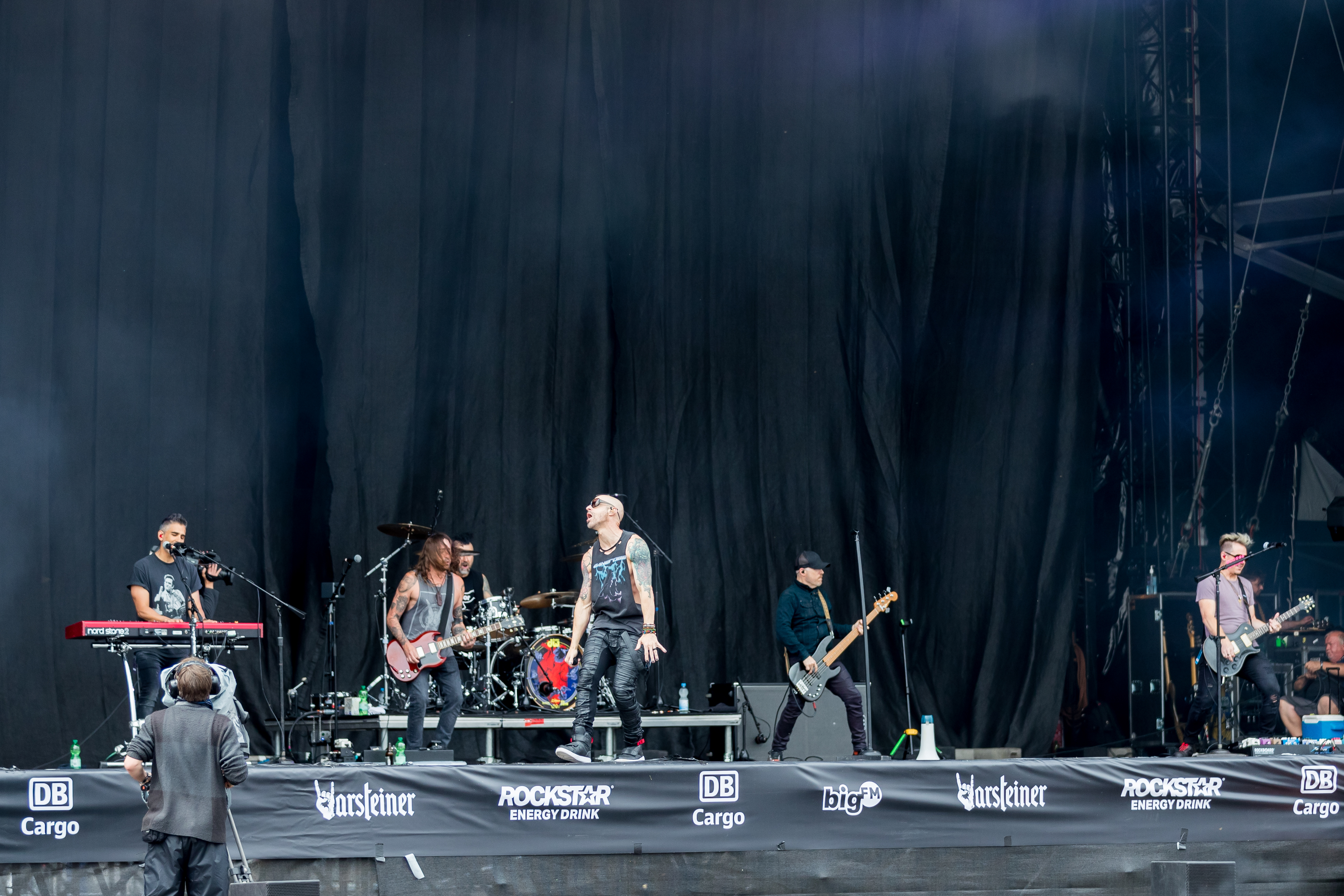
- Daughtry at Rock am Ring 2022

Background information
- Origin: McLeansville, North Carolina, U.S.
- Genres: Post-grunge; hard rock; pop rock
- Years active: 2006–present
- Labels: RCA; 19; Dogtree; ADA; Big Machine
- Members: Chris Daughtry; Brian Craddock; Elvio Fernandes; Marty O'Brien; Anthony Ghazel
- Past members: Jeremy Brady; Joey Barnes; Robin Diaz; Brandon Maclin; Josh Paul; Jeremy Schaffer; Josh Steely
- Website: daughtryofficial.com

Daughtry /ˈdɔːtri/ is an American rock band formed and fronted by namesake Chris Daughtry, who was a finalist on the fifth season of American Idol. Their self-titled debut album was released in November 2006 and reached number one on the Billboard 200. The album went on to sell more than six million copies in the United States, and has been certified six times platinum by the RIAA. Daughtry was also named the best selling album of 2007 by Billboard, becoming the fastest-selling debut rock album in Nielsen SoundScan history. The album produced four top 20 hits on the Billboard Hot 100, including top five hits "It's Not Over" and "Home".

The band's second album, Leave This Town, was released in July 2009 and debuted at number one on the Billboard 200 chart, becoming Daughtry's second number one album in the United States. To date, Leave This Town has sold over 1.3 million copies in the United States and has been certified platinum by the RIAA. The album's lead single, "No Surprise", became the band's fifth top 20 hit on the Hot 100. Their third studio album, Break the Spell, was released in November 2011 and debuted within the top 10 on the Billboard 200 chart. The album has been certified Gold by the RIAA. Daughtry's fourth studio album, Baptized, was released in November 2013, and debuted at number six on the Billboard 200 chart, selling approximately 90,000 units. They released their fifth and sixth albums, Cage to Rattle and Dearly Beloved, in July 2018 and September 2021, respectively. To date, Daughtry has sold over 9 million albums and over 25.6 million digital tracks in the U.S.

== History ==
=== 2005–2008: Origins, Daughtry and breakthrough success ===
Chris Daughtry, who finished in fourth place on the fifth season of American Idol in 2006, stated that he would form a new band after turning down Fuel's offer to become their lead singer. On July 10, 2006, Chris Daughtry had signed with RCA Records and 19 Recordings, which held contracts with fellow American Idol contestants such as Kelly Clarkson and Clay Aiken, and among others. Chris Daughtry is a singer-songwriter himself and has collaborated with several other songwriters, such as Live's Ed Kowalczyk, Seether's Shaun Morgan, Goo Goo Dolls's John Rzeznik, Fuel's Carl Bell, 3 Doors Down's Brad Arnold, Matchbox Twenty's Rob Thomas, SR-71's Mitch Allan, Shinedown's Brent Smith, Three Days Grace's Adam Gontier, and the former The Click Five singer Eric Dill, Theory of a Deadman's Tyler Connolly, Lifehouse's Jason Wade and Nickelback's Chad Kroeger.

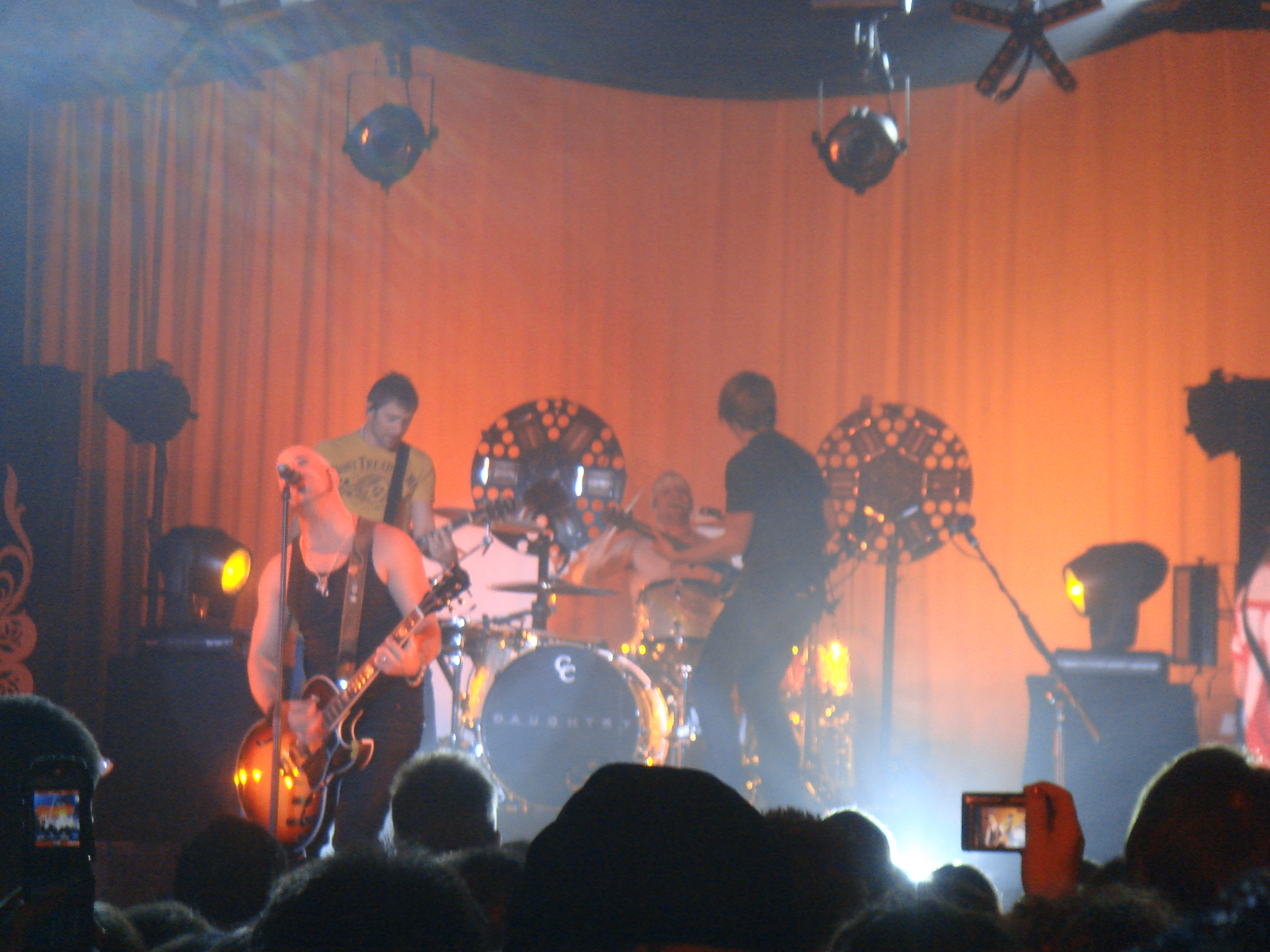
Daughtry performing at Nokia Theatre Times Square in 2007

Daughtry and members of his label held auditions. Ultimately, they chose four members for the band: Jeremy Brady, 21, guitarist (no longer in the band); Josh Steely, 36, lead guitarist; Josh Paul (no longer with the band), 29, bassist who played for Suicidal Tendencies; Joey Barnes, 30, drummer, (no longer with the band). Two of the band members hail from North Carolina – Barnes, whom Chris had known for some time, and Brady, who was introduced to him a month before the audition. Steely and Paul are both from California. The decision was made to name the band "Daughtry" in order to keep name recognition. In an interview, Chris Daughtry said, "We could have come out with a really obscure name, but coming from a TV show and having name recognition, it was easier just to go with my last name."

The band's self-titled debut album was produced by Howard Benson and was released by RCA Records on November 21, 2006. Chris Daughtry wrote and co-wrote all but two songs on the album – "Feels Like Tonight" and "What About Now". Other notable songwriters Dr. Luke and Max Martin contributed to the album, and session drummer Josh Freese played on all tracks. However, at the time the album was recorded, Chris was the only official member of the band, leading some to mistakenly believe that the band Daughtry is his solo career.

Daughtry was an instant success and spawned several hits for the group, starting with its first single "It's Not Over", which debuted on the radio on December 6, 2006, after being delayed from a planned September release and reaching number four on the Billboard Hot 100 and hitting the top 3 in several other charts. Shortly thereafter, Jeremy Brady departed and was replaced with Brian Craddock, 31, from Virginia. In interviews, Chris Daughtry and Craddock have discussed having known each other when Chris Daughtry was still a member of Absent Element.

After the success of "It's Not Over," the second single from the album, "Home" was released and peaked at number five on the Billboard Hot 100, after debuting at number 83, weeks ahead of its official release to radio. The song was also the official "kick-off" song on sixth season of American Idol, played after a contestant was voted off the show, also the case during season five of Australian Idol. The Brazilian version of Idol, called Ídolos Brazil, used this song as well in its second season. The album's third single, "What I Want", was released to rock radio on April 23, 2007, featuring musician Slash on lead guitars. The single has peaked at number 6 on the rock charts and is featured as a playable song on Guitar Hero: On Tour for the Nintendo DS. The band's fourth single "Over You" was released on July 24, 2007. The band performed this single live on Good Morning America on June 1, 2007. "Crashed", the album's fifth single, was released to rock stations on September 10, 2007, where it was also used in a commercial for Lego Bionicle. The song was also performed on the Pre-Race show on ABC for the NASCAR NEXTEL Cup Chevy Rock and Roll 400. The album's sixth single, "Feels Like Tonight", was released on January 8, 2008, just over a year after the album's release. The video debuted in January and the song was used for the 2007 WWE Tribute to the Troops. Their song "There and Back Again" was also the official theme song for WWE Backlash in 2007.

Due to the success of the singles, Daughtry was certified 4× Platinum on April 24, 2008. The group was on page 8 on Myspace.com of the most played artists, with over 29 million plays. In addition, the group has appeared on the famous compilation album series Now That's What I Call Music! five times, with their songs "It's Not Over", "Home", "Over You", "Feels Like Tonight" and "What About Now". The band was also nominated for four Grammy Awards in 2008, for Best Pop Performance by a Duo or Group with Vocal, Best Rock Album, Best Rock Song and Best Rock Performance by a Duo or Group with Vocal. According to billboard.com, Daughtry has had twenty number one hits around the world.

A deluxe edition of Daughtry's self-titled album was released on September 9, 2008. Along with the original CD, this expanded CD/DVD package features four bonus tracks, including acoustic versions of "What About Now," "It's Not Over", and "Home", plus a cover of Foreigner's "Feels Like the First Time". The DVD contains all five of Daughtry's music videos, two rarely seen live clips, and exclusive behind-the-scenes tour footage.

A shortened version of their massive hit single "Home" was used at the end of the English League Cup Final in February 2008 when the compilation of Tottenham Hotspur victory over Chelsea was shown at the end of the Sky coverage.

=== 2009–2010: Leave This Town ===
The second album, Leave This Town was released on July 14, 2009, with fourteen songs making the cut from the nineteen recorded songs. Chris said that the record is a very big rock album. He has also stated that the band had written and recorded over thirty new songs. He worked with Chad Kroeger from Nickelback, Ryan Tedder from OneRepublic, Trevor McNevan from Thousand Foot Krutch, Jason Wade from Lifehouse, Richard Marx, Scott Stevens from The Exies, Adam Gontier, vocalist of Three Days Grace and Eric Dill, former vocalist for The Click Five.

The album's first single, "No Surprise", was released on May 5, 2009, through their website. It officially went for radio play on May 26. Daughtry appeared on American Idol on May 6, 2009 (which is the Result Show of season 8's 'Rock Week') performing "No Surprise". "Life After You" was the follow-up single to "No Surprise".

Leave This Town debuted at number one on the Billboard 200 selling 269,000 copies in its first week. The record was also number one on the Digital Albums Chart and the Rock Chart.

After Leave This Town was released, Daughtry became the first American Idol artist to have two consecutive number-one albums. Carrie Underwood later achieved this accolade when her albums Carnival Ride (2007) and Play On (2009) went number one.

Daughtry performed on-stage at the American Music Awards on November 22, 2009, and sang their hit single "Life After You".

On November 10, 2009, USA Today revealed that Daughtry band members Chris Daughtry and Brian Craddock co-wrote "Don't Wanna Be Wrong", an iTunes Deluxe bonus track on Allison Iraheta's debut album, Just Like You.

On March 15, 2010, the band released the extended play Leave This Town: The B-Sides with six songs that were not released with the first album. A seventh song, "Back Again," was only available on physical releases of the EP.

On April 16, 2010, drummer Joey Barnes and the band had parted ways. Robin Diaz was tapped to replace him for the band's ongoing tour.

"September" was the third single from Leave This Town and it peaked at number two on HAC radio charts, number eighteen on Pop radio charts and number 36 on the Billboard Hot 100 chart.

=== 2011–2012: Break the Spell ===
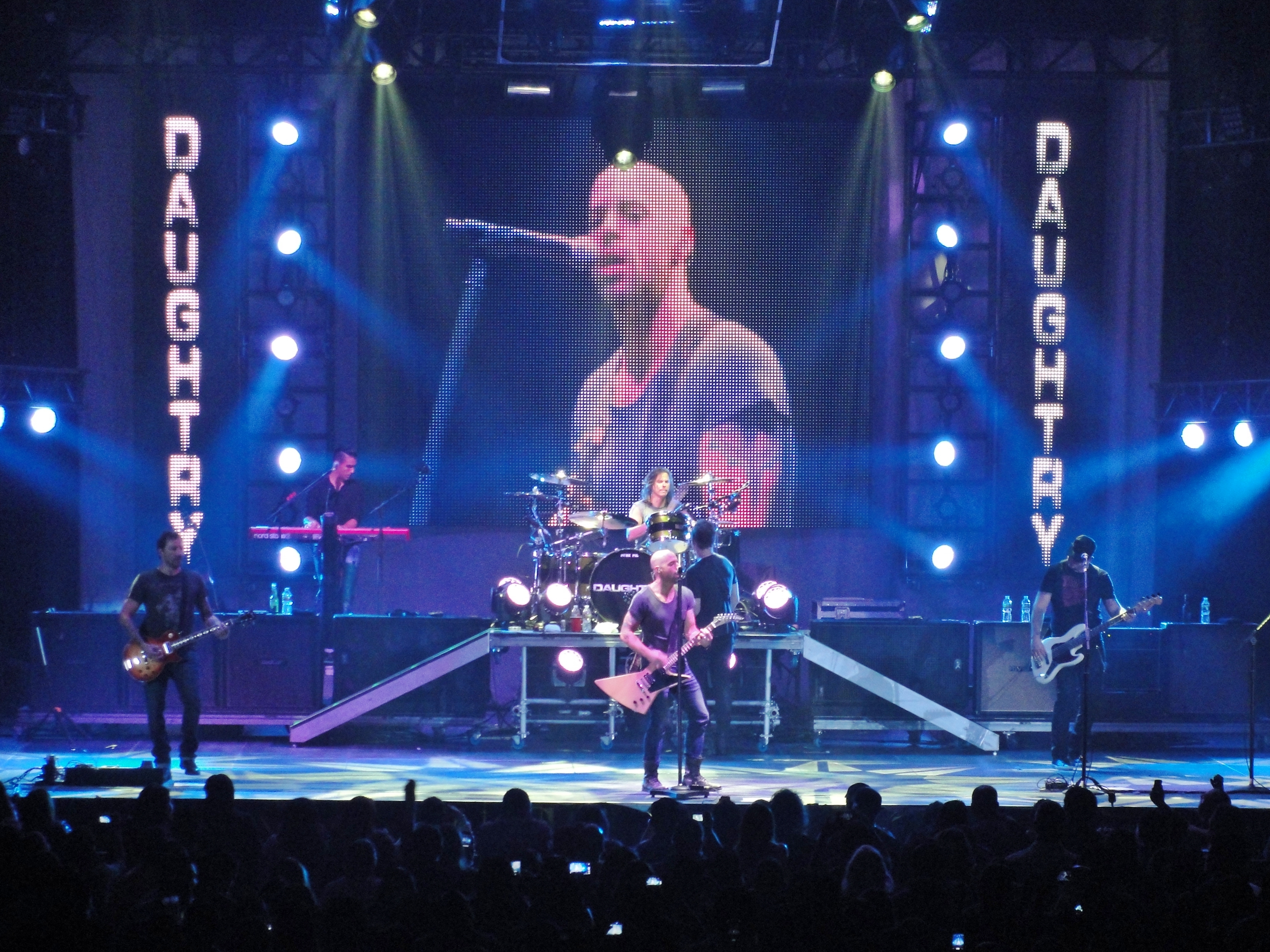
Daughtry performing in Laredo, Texas in November 2012

The band's third album, Break the Spell was released on November 21, 2011. They released the song "Drown in You" for the soundtrack to Batman: Arkham City.

Break the Spell debuted at number eight on the Billboard Top 200 on November 28, 2011, with 129,000 copies sold. As of January 2012 the album has sold 407,000 copies in the United States. On January 26, "Crawling Back to You" debuted at number twenty-four on the Japan Hot 100. "Renegade", "Crawling Back to You", and "Outta My Head" are the three singles released from the album. The fourth single "Start of Something Good" was released on September 4, 2012.

Daughtry commemorated Memorial Day with a performance of "Home" on the West Lawn of the U.S. Capitol in Washington, D.C. at PBS' National Memorial Day Concert on May 27, 2012.

On May 29, Chris announced that the band was in the studio working on "really cool stuff". They were recording an acoustic version of "Rescue Me" for DC Comics' "We Can Be Heroes" initiative in the Horn of Africa. The reimagined version of the song was released exclusively to iTunes on July 11, 2012.

On September 24, 2012, the band released a statement on its website that Josh Paul had decided to leave the band. Paul said, "The time has come for me to bow out and let the band continue on without me. This has been a very difficult decision, as these are not only my band mates, but my brothers."

=== 2013–2016: Baptized and It's Not Over...The Hits So Far ===
During Daughtry's two days of writing for the album, they worked with Matt Thiessen, wrote with Blair Daly, and Espionage.

On March 27, 2013, Daughtry tweeted that they had been working with Martin Johnson of Boys Like Girls and Rock Mafia. Over the course of several days in May, he revealed other artists with whom he was collaborating, including Scott Stevens, Ali Tamposi, The Monsters and the Strangerz, Martin Johnson, and Sam Hollander. Daughtry tweeted that he was cutting vocals for the album on May 15. A few days later, Chris Daughtry tweeted that Josh Paul had rejoined the band. On May 22, 2013, Chris Daughtry played a new song, "Broken Arrows", that he wrote for the new album. Chris said that they hope to have the first single out by the end of the year and the entire record out by February 2014.

On August 23, Chris said that he had the album title and that the fans will hear the single very soon. Throughout early September, Daughtry teased the single's cover and snippets of its lyrics. There was a contest to reveal their new single; unfortunately, on September 12, it was leaked by someone from RCA Records, revealing the single's name of "Waiting for Superman", which was released on September 17. Their fourth album was named Baptized and released November 19, 2013.

The band performed on the 2013 Dick Clark's New Year's Rockin' Eve with Ryan Seacrest.

On May 21, 2014, Daughtry and Robin Diaz parted ways due to scheduling conflicts.

A greatest hits album, It's Not Over...The Hits So Far, was released on February 12, 2016, with singles from their studio albums and two new songs. On January 29, 2016, "Torches" was released as the lead single.

=== 2016–2018: Cage to Rattle ===
On April 20, 2016, Chris Daughtry posted a video on Instagram of him tracking guitar. Chris has also posted pictures of him in the studio recording vocals. He said that the album will be more rock focused saying that "It's not such a dramatic departure from what we did on the first three albums, as opposed to the last record, where it was very pop-driven production." On May 21, 2016, while performing at the O2 Academy in Birmingham, Chris said: "I regret to inform you that other than the two songs that's on the greatest hits we don't have anything new to play yet. However I do promise you this, we are working on the fifth album and there are guitars on it. Take that how you want, but it is a rock record so ..." As of May 31, the band was in the tracking process of their next album at Blackbird Studios in Nashville, Tennessee, according to Chris' Instagram. On June 25, they performed the song, "Backbone", during the Feed the Machine tour with Nickelback at Frederik Meijer Gardens & Sculpture Park in Grand Rapids Charter Township, Michigan.

On March 30, 2018, "Backbone" was released as the lead single from their upcoming fifth studio album, Cage to Rattle. The first official single from Cage to Rattle was "Deep End," and the album was released on July 27, 2018.

=== 2019–2023: The Masked Singer, departure from RCA, and Dearly Beloved ===
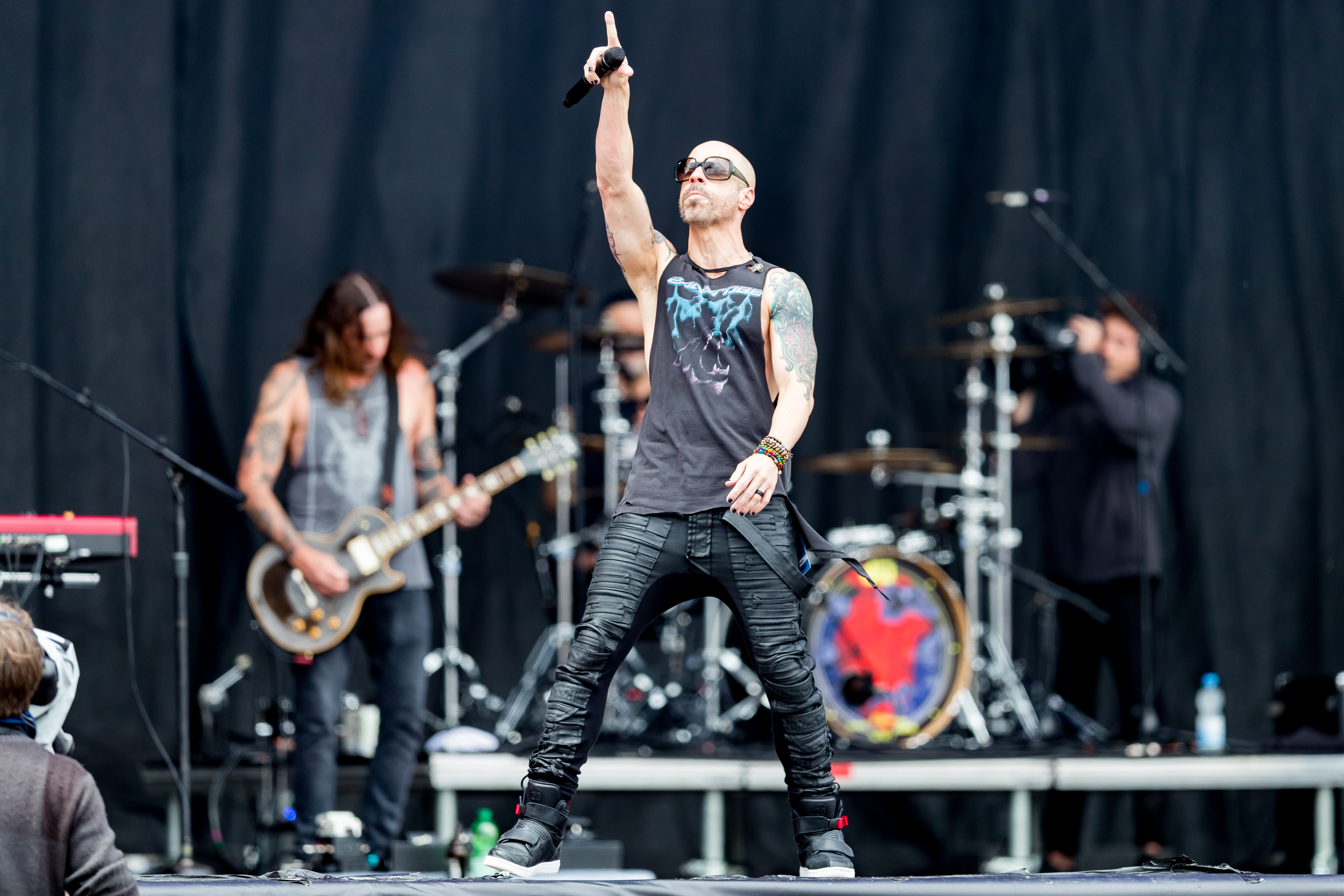
Daughtry at Rock am Ring 2022

In September 2019, Daughtry and RCA, their record label since 2006, decided to split ways. The split was due to contract fulfillment, wanting to part ways. On the spilt Daughtry said, "We've always been a rock band. And when you're dealing with a major label, there's always that pressure of needing to turn in hits and needing to cater to a certain format, and I didn't want to do that anymore."

On November 20, 2019, Chris Daughtry revealed via his Instagram that Daughtry had started to record their sixth studio album and had teamed up with producer Scott Stevens.

On December 18, 2019, Chris Daughtry was revealed to be the "Rottweiler" in the second season of The Masked Singer. He performed "Alive" by Sia on the finale, and it was released as a single by the band.

On August 10, 2020, Daughtry announced that while they are working on a new album, the COVID-19 pandemic halted the band's recording process. It was also rumored Daughtry has signed with Warner Music Group. It was later revealed that while Daughtry is now independent, their distribution falls under Warner Music.

On August 13, 2020, Daughtry released their single "World on Fire." On March 18, 2021, they released the single "Heavy Is the Crown." On May 28, the band released a cover version of the band Temple of the Dog's song "Hunger Strike" featuring Lajon Witherspoon.

The band's sixth studio album, Dearly Beloved, was released on September 17, 2021. Along with the announcement of the album, the band released the single "Lioness".

On January 16, 2022, Josh Paul announced in an Instagram post that he was leaving the band once again.

On January 5, 2023, the band released a cover of Journey's 1983 hit "Separate Ways (Worlds Apart)", featuring guest vocals from Halestorm frontwoman Lzzy Hale.

On June 10, 2023, Brandon Maclin announced via Instagram that he was leaving the band. Jeremy Schaffer was confirmed as the band's new drummer on June 22.

=== 2023–present: Label change and Shock to the System ===
In August 2023, Big Machine Records announced that they had signed the band. They released the single, "Artificial", on August 11. On February 9, 2024, "Artificial" reached number one on Billboard's Mainstream Rock Airplay chart. The band released the single, "Pieces", on March 22, 2024. Daughtry announced in June that their next album would be released in two parts, with the first part being released in September. The single, "Nervous", was released on June 28. On August 9, 2024, the band released the single, "The Reckoning". They also announced that their EP, Shock to the System (Part One), would be released on September 27, 2024. Shock to the System (Part Two) was released on September 12, 2025.

On July 14, 2026, the band released a compilation of eleven re-recorded songs from their catalog entitled There And Back Again. According to Chris Daughtry, the new recordings deliberately mirror their original counterparts "note for note."

== Artistry ==
Daughtry's music is primarily defined by pop rock, hard rock and post-grunge influences. AllMusic describes the sound as "muscular hard rock with heart."

In a January 2024 interview with Tommy Behnke of The Daily Herald, Chris Daughtry said that he grew tired of producing softer-sounding music at the recommendation of RCA Records that he did not always feel passionate about making.

== Tours ==
The band has been touring non-stop since January 2007. They have performed across the U.S. and Canada, along with shows in the UK, Germany, and Singapore. They opened for Nickelback for a brief stint, Puddle of Mudd, and Finger Eleven and have featured 12 Stones, Cinder Road, Small Town Sleeper, Day of Fire and Eve To Adam as opening acts. On May 27, 2007, the band performed during the Indianapolis 500 Pre-Race show on ABC, and headlined the 2007 Summerfest at the Marcus amphitheater in Milwaukee, Wisconsin with a crowd of more than 15,000 on July 6. Daughtry has played shows in Australia, as well as the United Kingdom and across Europe for the first time and opened for Bon Jovi for several shows in November. They were featured as the opening act during Bon Jovi's Lost Highway Tour. The band began a sold-out tour with Bon Jovi on February 18, 2008, all the way through the end of April. Chris Daughtry joined Bon Jovi onstage many nights to perform their song, "Blaze of Glory".

On Thanksgiving 2009, Daughtry performed the halftime show for the Dallas Cowboys vs. Oakland Raiders football game to kick off the Salvation Army Red Kettle campaign.

Daughtry's second leg of the Leave This Town Tour started on March 18, 2010, in Baltimore and continued through June.

From March 20 to August 18, 2012, Daughtry went on their second headlining tour, the Break the Spell Tour across North America with openers SafetySuit and Mike Sanchez. The tour supported their third studio album 'Break the Spell'. The band played at small theaters and one arena.

Daughtry and 3 Doors Down co-headlined a nineteen date tour in the United States from November 17 to December 15, 2012. On December 10, 2012, more dates were added, extending the tour to February 26, 2013. On October 12, 2012, Daughtry toured Europe with shows in Russia. Daughtry opened up for Nickelback once again on their Feed the Machine Tour starting June 2017.

Headlining

- Leave This Town Tour (2009–10)
- Break the Spell Tour (2012)
- Baptized World Tour (2014)
- Greatest Hits Tour (2016)
- Cage to Rattle Tour (2018–19)
- Dearly Beloved Tour (2021–22)
- Shock to the System Tour (2023-24)
- Adrenaline Gone Ballistic (2025-26)
- 20 Years Unplugged (2026)

Co-headlining

- Bigger than Life Tour (2012–13) with 3 Doors Down
- Daughtry/Goo Goo Dolls Summer Tour (2014) with Goo Goo Dolls

Supporting

- Lost Highway Tour (2008) with Bon Jovi
- Dark Horse Tour (2010) with Nickelback
- Feed the Machine Tour (2017) with Nickelback
- 2024 Tour (2024) with Staind & Breaking Benjamin
- 2026 Tour (2026) with Sevendust & Alter Bridge

== Band members ==
=== Current lineup ===
- Chris Daughtry – lead vocals (2006–present), guitar (2006, 2008–present)
- Brian Craddock – guitar, backing vocals (2006–present)
- Elvio Fernandes – keyboards, piano, occasional guitar, backing vocals (2012–present)
- Marty O'Brien – bass (2022–present)
- Anthony Ghazel – drums (2025–present)

=== Former members ===
- Josh Steely – guitar, backing vocals (2006–2024)
- Josh Paul – bass, backing vocals (2006–2012, 2013–2022)
- Joey Barnes – drums, percussion, keyboards, backing vocals (2006–2010)
- Jeremy Brady – guitar, backing vocals (2006)
- Robin Diaz – drums, percussion (2010–2014)
- Brandon Maclin – drums, percussion, backing vocals (2016–2023)
- Jeremy Schaffer – drums, percussion (2023–2025)

=== Former live/touring members ===
- Andy Waldeck – bass, backing vocals (2012–2013)
- Jamal Moore – drums, percussion, backing vocals (2014–2016)

== Awards and nominations ==
=== American Music Awards ===
Year	Category	Nominated work	Result
2007	New Artist of the Year	Daughtry	Won
2007	Favorite Adult Contemporary Artist	Daughtry	Won
2007	Favorite Pop/Rock Album	Daughtry	Won
2008	Favorite Pop/Rock Band/Duo/Group	Daughtry	Won
2008	Favorite Adult Contemporary Artist	Daughtry	Nominated

=== Billboard Awards ===
Year	Category	Nominated work	Result
2007	Top Billboard 200 Album	Daughtry	Won
2007	Top Artist – Duo/Group (pop)	Daughtry	Won
2007	Top New Artist	Daughtry	Won
2007	Top Comprehensive Artist	Daughtry	Won
2007	Hot 100 Artists – Duo/Group	Daughtry	Won
2007	Hot Adult Top 40 Artist	Daughtry	Won

=== BMI London Awards ===
Year	Nominee / work	Award	Result	Ref.
2008	"Feels Like Tonight"	Pop Award	Won	

=== BMI Pop Awards ===
Year	Nominee / work	Award	Result
2008	"Home"	Best Pop	Won
2008	"It's Not Over"	Best Pop	Won
2009	"Feels Like Tonight"	Best Pop	Won
2009	"Over You"	Best Pop	Won
2010	"No Surprise"	Best Pop	Won
2010	"What About Now"	Best Pop	Won
2011	"Life After You"	Best Pop	Won

=== Grammy ===
Year	Category	Work	Result
2008	Best Pop Performance by a Duo or Group with Vocals	"Home"	Nominated
2008	Best Rock Performance by a Duo or Group with Vocal	"It's Not Over"	Nominated
2008	Best Rock Song	"It's Not Over"	Nominated
2008	Best Rock Album	Daughtry	Nominated

=== Other ===
Year	Association	Category	Work	Result
2007	MTV Video Music Awards	Monster Single	"Home"	Nominated
2007	Teen Choice Awards	Favorite Rock Song	"It's Not Over"	Nominated
2007	Teen Choice Awards	Favorite Breakout Group	Daughtry	Nominated
2009	Kid's Choice Awards	Favorite Music Group	Daughtry	Nominated
2009	People's Choice Awards	Best Rock song	"Home"	Won
2010	Teen Choice Awards	Choice Music Album	Leave This Town	Nominated
2010	Teen Choice Awards	Choice American Idol Alum	Chris Daughtry	Nominated
2011	People's Choice Awards	Favorite Rock Band	Daughtry	Nominated
2014	World Music Awards	World's Best Group	Daughtry	Nominated
2014	World Music Awards	World's Best Album	"Baptized"	Nominated
2014	World Music Awards	World's Best Live Act	"Daughtry"	Nominated

== Discography ==
- Daughtry (2006)
- Leave This Town (2009)
- Break the Spell (2011)
- Baptized (2013)
- Cage to Rattle (2018)
- Dearly Beloved (2021)
