= Over You (Daughtry song) =

Single by Daughtry

from the album Daughtry
- Released: July 24, 2007
- Recorded: 2006
- Genre: Alternative rock
- Length: 3:24
- Label: RCA; 19
- Songwriters: Chris Daughtry; Brian Howes
- Producer: Howard Benson

Daughtry singles chronology
"What I Want" (2007)	"Over You" (2007)	"Crashed" (2007)

"Over You" is the third mainstream single (the fourth overall) from Daughtry's first album, Daughtry. It was first announced by Chris Daughtry at Summerfest 2007, and was released July 24, 2007 to digital retailers as well as Top 40 and Adult Contemporary radio. "Over You" was written by Chris Daughtry and Brian Howes, who also co-wrote previous single, "What I Want". The song was originally rumored to be the second single having been voted the fans' choice for second single on a poll on the band's site, where it continuously received the most votes for favorite song from the album.

It won an award at the BMI Awards on May 19, 2009.

== Song meaning ==
In a radio interview, Chris Daughtry said the song is a breakup song about the difficulties of getting over someone, until one day you finally do ("The day I thought I'd never get through, I got over you"). Chris' quote on the meaning of "Over You":

You're with somebody for a really long time, and you pretty much think that this is the person you're gonna spend the rest of your life with, and then they drop the ball on you. Then you think it's over, your life is done, and then somebody better walks in.

== Music video ==
The video for the song was shot with director P. R. Brown in Los Angeles on July 17 and 18, 2007. The video was supposed to premiere on Yahoo! on August 16, but was removed from the site's upcoming video premieres list. It later returned for a short time on the list to be released on August 27, 2007, but it was again removed, and was not release scheduled. Chris revealed in an interview that the video was delayed because the band was unsatisfied with certain elements of it, and the video was still in the editing phase. He went on to state that they wanted to make sure that they were happy with the video before its release.

The video was premiered on September 20, 2007 on VH1.com. The video is about a girl named Sarah (scene name only), played by Jessica Szohr, who is struggling with alcoholism. She is seen at the beginning of the video with her boyfriend at a party, becoming drunk, while her boyfriend watches on in dismay. After the party, they end up in a car crash caused by her alcohol problems. Following the accident, Sarah is seen grief-stricken and depressed over what she has caused, and cannot seem to get over her alcoholism. The video ends with Sarah coming to grips with her problem and seeking help by going to Alcoholics Anonymous. The band is shown playing in a broken down house throughout the video.

== Chart performance ==
The single was released to Top 40 radio on July 24, 2007. It quickly began receiving heavy airplay from many stations, including New York's Z100. It entered the Billboard Hot 100 at number 94, and peaked at number eighteen, becoming the band's third top twenty hit on the chart. It is also their third top twenty hit in Canada, and their third top forty hit in New Zealand. On the U.S. Adult Top 40, it is the band's third top three hit. As of January 2011, "Over You" has sold 1,315,000 in digital downloads.

== Charts ==
=== Weekly charts ===
Chart (2007–08)	Peak position
Austria (Ö3 Austria Top 40)	31
Canada Hot 100 (Billboard)	16
Canada CHR/Top 40 (Billboard)	12
Canada Hot AC (Billboard)	4
Germany (GfK)	57
New Zealand (Recorded Music NZ)	26
Sweden (Sverigetopplistan)	22
US Billboard Hot 100	18
US Adult Contemporary (Billboard)	16
US Adult Pop Airplay (Billboard)	3
US Pop Airplay (Billboard)	4

=== Year-end charts ===
Chart (2007)	Position
US Adult Top 40 (Billboard)	27

Chart (2008)	Position
US Adult Top 40 (Billboard)	20

== Certifications ==
Region	Certification	Certified units/sales
Canada (Music Canada)	Gold	20,000^{*}
New Zealand (RMNZ)	Platinum	30,000^{‡}
United States (RIAA)	2× Platinum	2,000,000^{‡}
^{*} Sales figures based on certification alone.^{‡} Sales+streaming figures based on certification alone.
