= Feels Like Tonight =

Single by Daughtry

from the album Daughtry
- Released: January 8, 2008
- Recorded: 2006
- Genre: Alternative rock; pop rock
- Length: 3:58
- Label: RCA
- Songwriters: Luke Gottwald; Max Martin; Sheppard Solomon
- Producer: Howard Benson

Daughtry singles chronology
"Crashed" (2007)	"Feels Like Tonight" (2008)	"What About Now" (2008)

"Feels Like Tonight" is a song recorded by American rock band Daughtry. It was released on January 8, 2008, as the sixth single from their 2006 debut album.

== Background ==
Shortly after releasing the band's first compilation album It's Not Over...The Hits So Far, frontman Chris Daughtry spoke with Entertainment Weekly about his original distaste for the song and eventual acceptance, saying

Max Martin and Dr. Luke had written this song and it was actually one of two songs that I’ve recorded that I didn’t write anything on. I didn’t work with those guys. I remember it being very close to the end of the record making process [for 2006’s self-titled debut] and I remember getting this song and I was like, 'No, no, I’m not cutting it, it’s way too pop. It’s so not with the rest of the record.' I was really being a bull about it. I remember being told, 'This was the song that they wrote for you had you won the show.' And I was like, 'Well now I definitely don’t want to do it!' Anyway, I appeased them and I recorded it and then I remember hearing it back and going 'OK, you were right, this was definitely a good idea.' And it became one of our bigger songs. I still don’t know what it means.

== Music video ==
The music video was shot under director Martin Weisz. The video debuted Monday, January 14, 2008, on Amazon.com.

The video begins with the band playing in a barren desert in the daytime. When the first chorus starts, clouds are shown racing by and it suddenly changes to nighttime. After the end of the chorus the clouds clear and it is daytime again, however the band is now playing in a forest setting. When the chorus starts for the second time, it again becomes night and Chris Daughtry is shown walking out of the forest through a door. When he emerges the band is waiting for him on a city rooftop, it being daytime. Upon the third and final chorus, it once again becomes night and the band is shown playing on the rooftop with the lit up skyscrapers of the city behind them.

== Track listing ==
- Germany CD single
1. "Feels Like Tonight" (Main Version) - 3:58
2. "Feels Like Tonight" (Video) - 3:58
- Special Edition
1. "Feels Like Tonight" (Main Version) - 3:58
2. "Feels Like Tonight" (Video) - 3:58
3. "Feels Like the First Time" (Foreigner cover) - 3:24

== Chart performance ==
In its first week of release, it was the most added track at both Mainstream Top 40 and Hot AC radio. The following week it debuted at number 89 on the Hot 100, and peaked at number 24, giving the band their fourth top forty Hot 100 hit from the album. It debuted on the Billboard Pop 100 at number 99, peaking at number seventeen, and the Adult Top 40 at number 29, where it has reached number one, becoming the band's third number one and fourth top five hit on that chart. This made Daughtry the first band to have four top five hits on the Adult Top 40 from their debut album. On the Hot Adult Contemporary Chart, the song reached number five, giving the band their second top ten on the chart. It debuted on the Canadian Hot 100 at number 67, peaking at number 30.

=== Weekly charts ===
Chart (2008)	Peak position
Canada Hot 100 (Billboard)	30
Canada AC (Billboard)	20
Canada CHR/Top 40 (Billboard)	30
Canada Hot AC (Billboard)	5
Germany (GfK)	67
US Billboard Hot 100	24
US Adult Contemporary (Billboard)	5
US Adult Pop Airplay (Billboard)	1
US Pop Airplay (Billboard)	12

=== Year end charts ===
Chart (2008)	Position
Canadian Hot 100 (Billboard)	94
Canada Hot AC (Billboard)	13
US Billboard Hot 100	95
US Adult Contemporary (Billboard)	10
US Adult Top 40 (Billboard)	3

Chart (2009)	Position
US Adult Contemporary (Billboard)	26

== Release history ==
Region	Date	Format
Worldwide	January 8, 2008	Digital download
United States	January 8, 2008	Mainstream airplay
Germany	August 28, 2008	CD single
