= Daily Herald (Roanoke Rapids) =

Coordinates: 36.457271°N 77.656508°W

The Daily Herald
- Type: Daily newspaper
- Format: Broadsheet
- Owner: Paxton Media Group
- Publisher: John McClure
- Managing editor: Tia Bedwell
- Founded: 1914
- Language: American English
- Headquarters: Roanoke Rapids, North Carolina
- OCLC number: 24893313
- Website: rrdailyherald.com

The Daily Herald is an American, English language community-focused multi-media company serving the Roanoke Valley of North Carolina and Lake Gaston with newspapers, shoppers, magazines and websites. The company's primary media is the newspaper, The Daily Herald, which is published Tuesday through Friday afternoons and Sunday mornings.

The weekly Roanoke Rapids Herald was founded in 1914 by editor and publisher J.T. Stainback. From 1929 to 1947 the newspaper was owned and edited by Carroll Wilson. The newspaper was purchased by Milton and James Wick—later Wick Communications—in 1947. In September 1948 the newspaper began publishing as a daily paper in the afternoon and a morning paper on Sunday with the name changing to the Daily and Sunday Herald. The company moved to its present location at 916 Roanoke Avenue in June 1957. The newspaper names were combined as The Daily Herald in 1998. In January 2018, Wick sold The Daily Herald to Paxton Media Group.

The company also publishes a weekly shopper, the Roanoke Valley SmartSaver. Other publications include Lake the Magazine which is published monthly and Living 50 Plus, a quarterly magazine. The company operates three websites

The Daily Herald is a member of the North Carolina Press Association.

== See also ==
- List of newspapers in North Carolina
