= Daughtry (album) =

Studio album by Daughtry
- Released: November 21, 2006
- Recorded: August–September 2006; Los Angeles
- Studios: Bay 7 Studios (Valley Village, Los Angeles); Capitol Studios (Hollywood); Sound Factory Studios (Hollywood); Sparky Dark Studio (Calabasas, California)
- Genre: Post-grunge
- Length: 43:26
- Labels: RCA; 19
- Producer: Howard Benson

Daughtry chronology
| Daughtry (2006) | Leave This Town (2009) |

Singles from Daughtry
- 1. "It's Not Over" Released: November 21, 2006; 2. "Home" Released: April 10, 2007; 3. "What I Want" Released: April 23, 2007; 4. "Over You" Released: July 24, 2007; 5. "Crashed" Released: September 5, 2007; 6. "Feels Like Tonight" Released: January 8, 2008; 7. "What About Now" Released: July 1, 2008

Daughtry is the debut studio album by American rock band Daughtry, released by RCA Records on November 21, 2006. The band is fronted by American Idol fifth season-finalist Chris Daughtry. (Note: Due to possible naming confusion, in this article, the band is Daughtry, the album is Daughtry (italicized), and the singer is referred to by his full name, (Chris Daughtry).) The release is the fastest-selling debut rock album in SoundScan history, the best-selling album of 2007, according to Billboard, and the band's highest-selling record.

== Background and production ==
"Breakdown", as it appears on Daughtry, is actually a rewrite and combination of two songs previously recorded by Chris Daughtry's former alternative metal/hard rock band, Absent Element. The songs "Conviction" and "Break Down" appeared on the EP Uprooted, the only release by Absent Element, released on October 20, 2005.

== Promotion and release ==
The first single released from the album is "It's Not Over", and fellow Idol contestant Ace Young, producer Gregg Wattenberg, and Course of Nature frontman Mark Wilkerson are credited as co-writers. On December 25, 2008, the song was nominated for Best Rock Song and Best Rock Performance by a Duo or Group with Vocals at the 50th Annual Grammy Awards. In 2007, WWE used "There and Back Again" as the theme song for their April pay-per-view Backlash event and "Feels Like Tonight" for their annual Tribute to the Troops special.

=== Singles ===
"It's Not Over" was released on November 21, 2006, the same day as the album, and proved to be a success, reaching the top five on multiple charts, including the U.S. Billboard Hot 100, where it peaked at No. 4.

The second single, "Home", came out on April 10, 2007, peaked at No. 5 on the Billboard Hot 100, and made Daughtry the first debut album by an Idol contestant to contain two top-five Hot 100 singles. The third single, "What I Want", was released on April 23, and peaked at No. 6 on Mainstream Rock.

The fourth single, "Over You", was released to top 40 and Hot AC radio on July 24, 2007, and peaked in the top 20 of the Hot 100. The fifth single, "Crashed", came out on September 10, 2007.

The sixth single, "Feels Like Tonight", was released on January 8, 2008, and peaked at No. 25 on the Hot 100. The seventh and final single, "What About Now", came out on July 1, 2008.

== Critical reception ==
Professional ratings
Review scores
| Source | Rating |
|---|---|
| AllMusic | 3.5/5 stars |
| Digital Spy | 4/5 stars |
| Entertainment Weekly | B |
| IGN | 7.5/10 stars |
| Jesus Freak Hideout | 4/5 stars |
| Q | 3/5 stars |
| Ultimate Guitar | 8.5/10 stars |
| Rolling Stone | 2/5 stars |

Daughtry received mixed reviews from critics. While many reviewers felt that the album was generally pleasing and the first real "rock" album from American Idol alumni, others said it was unoriginal and too commercial. While Ken Barnes of USA Today conceded that Chris Daughtry has "strong pipes and palpable angst", overall he found the band "generic", calling them "FuelNickelStaindback". (Note: This is a portmanteau that references the 1990s/2000s post-grunge bands Fuel, Staind, and Nickelback.) People magazine found the album "a solid if not spectacular effort that at the very least proves that Chris Daughtry is not just another Idol also-ran." Christian Hoard with Rolling Stone said that "[Chris] Daughtry gets points for not courting soccer moms, but just because he can howl like a motherfucker doesn't mean he's not a cheeseball". In a mixed review, Billboard said the album "is music tailor-made for ill-conceived radio formatting, music for consumers whose taste has already been well-established if not preprogrammed", then added, "But [Chris] Daughtry sure does sing his butt off". Stephen Thomas Erlewine of Allmusic awarded the album three-and-a-half stars out of five, calling it "a debut that's not only a lot more credible than any American Idol-affiliated rock album should be, but it's a lot easier to digest than most of its ilk".

The record won an American Music Awards in 2007 for Favorite Pop-Rock Album. It was nominated for four 2008 Grammy Awards: Best Rock Album, Best Rock Song for "It's Not Over", Best Pop Performance by a Duo or Group with Vocals for "Home", and Best Rock Performance by a Duo or Group with Vocals for "It's Not Over"; the album did not win any.

== Commercial performance ==
Competing with a flurry of releases during its opening week (Jay-Z, The Beatles, Johnny Cash, and others), Daughtry proved to be commercially viable. The album debuted at number two on the U.S. Billboard 200, behind Jay-Z's Kingdom Come. It sold approximately 304,000 copies in its first week.

The album reached number one on the Billboard 200, with 65,000 copies sold in its ninth week on the chart, for the issue dated February 3, 2007, becoming the first album from an Idol alumnus to top the Billboard 200 since Ruben Studdard's Soulful in December 2003. The following week, the album fell to number three on the chart, but its sales increased to 80,000. The record remained at number three and sold nearly 80,000 copies in each of the subsequent three weeks. After this, sales increased to 102,000 copies, but the album dropped to number nine on the Billboard 200; in the following week, the album climbed to number two on the Billboard 200 and sold 84,000 copies. In the next week, its 15th on the chart, it climbed back to the number-one spot. It was then certified 2× Platinum on March 7, 2007. The album was released in the UK on August 20 and debuted at number 13.

For the chart week of June 30, 2007, the album was certified 3× Platinum. It stayed in the top 10 of the Billboard 200 for 27 of the first 28 weeks of its release.

The deluxe edition of the album was released on the chart week of September 9, 2008, and brought a 95% leap to the previous week.

Daughtry is the only debut album in the history of SoundScan to have stayed in the top 200 for 575 weeks. The record had sold 5,040,000 units in the US as of December 2015 and was certified 6× Platinum by the RIAA on September 17, 2019. It spent a total of 148 weeks in the top 40.

== Track listing ==
| No. | Title | Writer(s) | Length |
|---|---|---|---|
| 1. | "It's Not Over" | Chris Daughtry; Gregg Wattenberg; Mark Wilkerson; Brett Young | 3:34 |
| 2. | "Used To" | Daughtry; Howard Benson; Zac Maloy | 3:32 |
| 3. | "Home" | Daughtry | 4:15 |
| 4. | "Over You" | Daughtry; Brian Howes | 3:27 |
| 5. | "Crashed" | Daughtry; Nina Ossoff; Dana Calitri; Kathy Sommer | 3:31 |
| 6. | "Feels Like Tonight" | Max Martin; Luke Gottwald; Shep Solomon | 4:01 |
| 7. | "What I Want" (featuring Slash) | Daughtry; Howes | 2:48 |
| 8. | "Breakdown" | Daughtry | 4:01 |
| 9. | "Gone" | Daughtry | 3:21 |
| 10. | "There and Back Again" | Daughtry; Brent Smith | 3:15 |
| 11. | "All These Lives" | Daughtry; Mitch Allan | 3:24 |
| 12. | "What About Now" | Ben Moody; David Hodges; Joshua Hartzler | 4:13 |
| Total length: | | | 43:26 |

Deluxe edition CD bonus tracks
| No. | Title | Length |
|---|---|---|
| 13. | "Feels Like the First Time" (Foreigner cover) | 3:24 |
| 14. | "It's Not Over (Live)" | 4:05 |
| 15. | "Home (Acoustic)" | 4:13 |
| 16. | "What About Now (Acoustic)" | 4:32 |
| Total length: | | 59:41 |

iTunes version bonus track
| No. | Title | Writer(s) | Length |
|---|---|---|---|
| 13. | "Sorry" | Daughtry; Alexander Rethwisch; Christopher Langton; Konstantin Rethwisch; Matthias Weber | 3:41 |
| Total length: | | | 45:41 |

Wal-Mart bonus tracks
| No. | Title | Length |
|---|---|---|
| 13. | "Home (Acoustic)" | 4:13 |
| 14. | "Crashed (Acoustic)" | 3:15 |
| Total length: | | 49:28 |

American Idol.com download bonus track
| No. | Title | Length |
|---|---|---|
| 13. | "Wanted Dead or Alive" (Bon Jovi cover) | 4:31 |
| Total length: | | 46:31 |

UK bonus track
| No. | Title | Length |
|---|---|---|
| 13. | "Breakdown (Live)" | 4:02 |
| Total length: | | 46:02 |

iTunes deluxe edition
| No. | Title | Length |
|---|---|---|
| 13. | "Feels Like the First Time" (Foreigner cover) | 3:24 |
| 14. | "It's Not Over (Live)" | 4:05 |
| 15. | "Home (Acoustic)" | 4:13 |
| 16. | "What About Now (Acoustic)" | 4:32 |
| 17. | "It's Not Over" (video) | 3:51 |
| 18. | "Home" (video) | 4:16 |
| 19. | "Over You" (video) | 3:43 |
| 20. | "Feels Like Tonight" (video) | 4:01 |
| 21. | "What About Now" (video) | 4:10 |
| 22. | "Breakdown (Live)" (video) | 4:29 |
| 23. | "There and Back Again (Live)" (video) | 6:25 |
| 24. | "Interview" (video) | 11:30 |
| Total length: | | 98:19 |

  - Joshua Hartzler is not credited in liner notes but is registered under BMI for co-writing "What About Now".

== Personnel ==
Credits from album liner notes and AllMusic.

Daughtry

- Chris Daughtry – lead vocals

Session musicians

- Phil X – lead and rhythm guitars
- Slash – lead guitar on "What I Want"
- Brent Smith – guitar on "There and Back Again"
- Paul Bushnell – bass
- Chris Chaney – bass on "What About Now"
- Josh Freese – drums
- Howard Benson – keyboards
- Jamie Muhoberac – keyboards on "What About Now" and "Feels Like Tonight"
- Samuel Formicola – viola
- Grace Oh – viola
- Dave Walther – viola
- Endre Granat – violin
- Victor Lawrence – violin
- Songa Lee – violin
- Cheryl Norman – violin
- Alyssa Park – violin
- Mike Robertson – violin
- Josefina Vergara – violin
- Jonathan Karoly – cello
- Jason Lippman – cello

Production

- Keith Armstrong – assistant mix engineer (1–7, 11, 12)
- Howard Benson – producer, programming
- Paul DeCarli – digital editing
- Simon Fuller – manager
- Pete Ganbarg – A&R
- Hatsukazu "Hatch" Inagaki – assistant engineer
- Ted Jensen – mastering
- Deborah Lurie – string arrangements
- Nik Karpen – assistant mix engineer (1–7, 11, 12)
- Chris Lord-Alge – mixing (1–7, 11, 12)
- Sterling McIIwaine – manager
- Paul Pavao – assistant mix engineer (8–10)
- Mike Plotnikoff – engineer, mixing (8–10)
- Casey Stone – string engineer
- Marc VanGool – guitar technician

Images

- Frank Hawkins – art direction
- Frank W.3 Ockenfels – photography

Deluxe edition DVD

- Doug Armstrong – director (live songs)
- Rob Dipple – editor (interview)
- Scott Fritz – audio mixing and recording (live songs)
- Samantha Lecca – producer (interview)
- Shauna O'Brien – producer (live songs)
- Raj Ramnath – video editor (live songs)
- Red Rocks Casino and Resort (Las Vegas, Nevada) – recording location (live songs; recorded August 23, 2007)

== Charts ==
=== Weekly charts ===
| Chart (2006–07) | Peak position |
|---|---|
| Australian Albums (ARIA) | 38 |
| Canadian Albums (Billboard) | 8 |
| Finnish Albums (Suomen virallinen lista) | 34 |
| French Albums (SNEP) | 51 |
| German Albums (Offizielle Top 100) | 40 |
| Irish Albums (IRMA) | 38 |
| Japanese Albums (Oricon) | 106 |
| Dutch Albums (Album Top 100) | 91 |
| New Zealand Albums (RMNZ) | 16 |
| Scottish Albums (Official Charts) | 11 |
| Swedish Albums (Sverigetopplistan) | 17 |
| Swiss Albums (Schweizer Hitparade) | 35 |
| UK Albums (Official Charts) | 13 |
| UK Album Downloads (Official Charts) | 21 |
| UK Rock & Metal Albums (Official Charts) | 2 |
| US Billboard 200 | 1 |
| US Top Rock Albums (Billboard) | 1 |
| US Top Alternative Albums (Billboard) | 2 |
| US Top Hard Rock Albums (Billboard) | 1 |

=== Year-end charts ===
| Chart (2007) | Position |
|---|---|
| US Billboard 200 | 1 |
| US Digital Albums (Billboard) | 3 |
| US Rock Albums (Billboard) | 1 |
| Chart (2008) | Position |
| US Billboard 200 | 33 |
| US Hard Rock Albums (Billboard) | 4 |
| US Rock Albums (Billboard) | 8 |
| Chart (2009) | Position |
| US Billboard 200 | 130 |
| US Hard Rock Albums (Billboard) | 20 |
| US Rock Albums (Billboard) | 47 |
| Chart (2010) | Position |
| US Top Catalog Albums (Billboard) | 17 |

=== Decade-end charts ===
| Chart (2000–2009) | Position |
|---|---|
| US Billboard 200 | 48 |

=== All-time charts ===
| Chart (All-time) | Position |
|---|---|
| US Billboard 200 | 27 |

== Certifications and sales ==
| Region | Certification | Certified units/sales |
|---|---|---|
| Australia (ARIA) | Gold | 35,000^{^} |
| Canada (Music Canada) | 2× Platinum | 200,000^{^} |
| New Zealand (RMNZ) | Platinum | 15,000^{‡} |
| United Kingdom (BPI) | Gold | 100,000^{‡} |
| United States (RIAA) | 6× Platinum | 6,000,000^{‡} |
Summaries
| Worldwide | — | 7,000,000 |
^{^} Shipments figures based on certification alone.^{‡} Sales+streaming figures based on certification alone.

== Release history ==
| Region | Date | Label | Format | Catalog |
|---|---|---|---|---|
| United States | November 21, 2006 | RCA; 19 | CD | |
| Philippines | January 12, 2007 | RCA | CD | |
| Australia | April 7, 2007 | SBME | CD | |
| Sweden | June 6, 2007 | RCA | CD | |
| Brazil | June 2007 | BMI | CD | |
| United Kingdom | August 20, 2007 | BMG | CD | |
| United States (deluxe edition) | September 9, 2008 | RCA; 19 | CD; DVD | |
