= Home (Daughtry song) =

2007 single by Daughtry

- U.S. single

Single by Daughtry

from the album Daughtry
- Released: April 10, 2007
- Recorded: 2006
- Genre: Rock; pop rock
- Length: 4:15
- Label: RCA
- Songwriter: Chris Daughtry
- Producer: Howard Benson

Daughtry singles chronology
| "It's Not Over" (2006) | "Home" (2007) | "What I Want" (2007) |

Music video
- "Home" on YouTube

"Home" is a 2007 song by American rock band Daughtry from their self-titled debut album. The song had been climbing up the U.S. charts for a few weeks before the song was announced as the second single from the album. The song was covered by Irish musician Kian Egan that served as the lead single from his debut album also titled Home.

== Song meaning ==
Chris Daughtry told Entertainment Weekly: "I had already made it through to Hollywood, but I’m still at home at this point, because once you make it through auditions there’s this whole torturous waiting period. And I got in that mindset of what this is going to be like. I’m going to be away from my family for the first time and I’m not working a job anymore. This is weird. I was wrapping my head around something a little more radio friendly and just started strumming and wrote “Home” within 15 to 20 minutes. I played it for (then-RCA Records CEO) Clive Davis once I was off the show and had a meeting with him. I played it in front of him with my guitar and he pretty much signed me on the spot."

== Music video ==
Screenshot from the music video of the band performing, with the fans in the foreground

The video for "Home" was directed by Danny Clinch, and filmed in downtown Greensboro, North Carolina (Chris Daughtry's hometown) on March 23, 2007. The video consists mostly of the live performance of the song during the band's free concert in Greensboro, which was filmed at night and features shining green light effects during the performance. The video also focuses on several of the estimated 24,000 fans in attendance at the concert. Scenes of this are intercut with various experiences the band has had on tour, such as showing the band backstage, on the tour bus, signing autographs, and just hanging out and having a good time.

== Critical reception ==
Chuck Taylor of Billboard, called the single an "anthemic rock power ballad".

On December 6, 2007, "Home" was nominated for Best Pop Performance by a Duo or Group with Vocal for the 50th Annual Grammy Awards.

This song was number 75 on MTV Asia's list of Top 100 Hits of 2007.

On January 8, 2008, it won the People's Choice Award for "Favorite Rock Song".

== Commercial performance ==
"Home" charted on the Hot 100 weeks before its release as a single, and became the band's second top-five single on the chart, peaking at number five. The song topped both the Billboard Adult Top 40 and the Adult Contemporary charts, spending ten consecutive weeks at number one on the Adult Top 40 ("It's Not Over" spent nine weeks at number one on the chart), as well as becoming the band's first number one on the AC chart, where it spent ten non-consecutive weeks at the top. The song became an unexpected hit on the Christian charts as well, reaching number twelve on the Hot Christian Songs chart. It was also a top five hit on the Canadian Hot 100. As of January 2011, the song has sold 2,012,000 digital downloads, and the single was certified 3× Platinum by the RIAA in September 2019.

== Live performances ==
Daughtry performed the song on the sixth-season finale of American Idol in May 2007.

== Charts ==
=== Weekly charts ===
Weekly chart performance for "Home"
| Chart (2007) | Peak position |
|---|---|
| Canada Hot 100 (Billboard) | 5 |
| Canada AC (Billboard) | 9 |
| Canada CHR/Top 40 (Billboard) | 11 |
| Canada Hot AC (Billboard) | 1 |
| European Hot 100 (Billboard) | 36 |
| Netherlands (Dutch Top 40) | 18 |
| Netherlands (Single Top 100) | 81 |
| New Zealand (Recorded Music NZ) | 23 |
| Sweden (Sverigetopplistan) | 52 |
| UK Singles (OCC) | 190 |
| UK Rock & Metal (Official Charts) | 31 |
| US Billboard Hot 100 | 5 |
| US Adult Contemporary (Billboard) | 1 |
| US Adult Pop Airplay (Billboard) | 1 |
| US Hot Christian Songs (Billboard) | 12 |
| US Christian Adult Contemporary (Billboard) | 14 |
| US Pop Airplay (Billboard) | 3 |

=== Year-end charts ===
2007 year-end chart performance for "Home"
| Chart (2007) | Position |
|---|---|
| US Billboard Hot 100 | 25 |
| US Adult Contemporary (Billboard) | 5 |
| US Adult Top 40 (Billboard) | 3 |
| US Christian AC (Billboard) | 30 |
| US Christian Songs (Billboard) | 23 |

2008 year-end chart performance for "Home"
| Chart (2008) | Position |
|---|---|
| US Adult Contemporary (Billboard) | 11 |

== Certifications ==
Certifications for "Home"
| Region | Certification | Certified units/sales |
|---|---|---|
| New Zealand (RMNZ) | Gold | 15,000^{‡} |
| United States (RIAA) | 3× Platinum | 3,000,000^{‡} |
^{‡} Sales+streaming figures based on certification alone.

== Release history ==
"Home" was confirmed as the second main single from the album in a New York Times article.

| Region | Date | Label |
|---|---|---|
| United States | April 10, 2007 | RCA |
| United Kingdom | January 8, 2008 | RCA |

== Kian Egan version ==
"Home"

Single by Kian Egan

from the album Home
- Released: October 10, 2014
- Genre: Pop
- Length: 3:45
- Label: Rhino
- Songwriter: Chris Daughtry
- Producer: Brian Rawling

Kian Egan singles chronology
| "Home" (2014) | "I'll Be" (2014) |

Music video
- "Home" on YouTube

"Home" was covered by Irish musician Kian Egan, who is best known as a member of the boy band Westlife. It was the first single from Egan's debut album with the same name. The song had its first Irish airplay on Ryan Tubridy's show on RTÉ 2fm on February 10. Egan said: "I've always absolutely loved this song. It means so much to me to be able to perform it, and for it to be the first track from my solo album is an incredible privilege.

=== Background and production ===
Egan said, "It's not very well known on this side of the world, I don't think. It was a massive hit in America a few years ago for a band called Daughtry. The reason why this was chosen was that it struck a nerve with me every time I was listening to my iPhone or my iPod. It feels right. It sounds the way I want it to sound for people to hear me for the first time. That's the other thing for me, an awful lot of people have never heard me sing a full song, they've heard snippets here and there. For me it was really important to have a song that I was really feel happy with and how I sounded on and it stood out for me so that's why we decided to go with it. I went into studio and I cut loads of songs and this one stood out from the start."

=== Critical reception ===
Brendon Veevers of RenowenedforSound.com stated that "Chris Daughtry-penned title track and while the original was a country-fuelled rocker for the American Idol chart-toppers, Egan delivers his version of the number with an equal amount of gusto as he swings his vocals around a rich production full of Americana influenced guitar riffs and a spectacular orchestral arrangement that provides the spine to the power-ballad quality of the track." Wynona Grant of FortitudeMagazine.co.uk describe the song as "a good, upbeat tune. Flourishes of electric guitar is a definite step up from expectations." EntertainmentNow.tv describe the song "million miles away from Westlife's sound, but the rockier edge and guitar work are enough to make it distinctive." "Egan's raspy vocals fit the song brilliantly, and his Irish tone makes for a perfect radio friendly hit. The track itself is a great choice for Kian, who admits he doesn't want to stray too far from Westlife's sound, but he does like rock music and guitars. The result is a polished track which wouldn't sound out of place on BBC Radio 2 (no bad thing)."

=== Music video ===
Kian teased fans by sharing a picture taken during his album photo shoot. In the music video, the handsome star sports designer stubble and casual clothing for the laid-back ballad as he sings lyrics such as 'I'm going home, to the place where I belong.' Kian wears a dark navy jacket and a jumper and jeans throughout the video as clips from his stint on I'm A Celebrity play on the wall, as well as a shot of his wife, Jodi Albert.

=== Track listing ===
- Digital download
1. "Home" – 3:45
- Promotional CD single
1. "Home" (radio mix)
2. "Home" (album version)

=== Charts ===
| Chart (2014) | Peak position |
|---|---|
| Ireland (IRMA) | 89 |
| UK Singles (OCC) | 156 |

== Appearances in the media ==
"Home" was chosen to replace Daniel Powter's "Bad Day" as the farewell song on the sixth season of American Idol in 2007. The song was played every time a contestant was voted off, with the exception of Phil Stacey.

"Home" was on the movie soundtrack for Wanderlust.

"Home" was the theme song for Chesapeake Shores from seasons two through six.

== See also ==
- List of Billboard Adult Contemporary number ones of 2007
- List of Hot Adult Top 40 Tracks number-one singles of 2007

== Sources ==
- https://web.archive.org/web/20070928081440/http://top40.entertainmenthit.com/Top_40_Countdown.html
