= It's Not Over (Daughtry song) =

2006 single by Daughtry

- US single cover

Single by Daughtry

from the album Daughtry
- Released: November 21, 2006
- Recorded: 2006
- Genre: Post-grunge
- Length: 3:35 (album version); 3:27 (radio edit)
- Label: RCA
- Songwriters: Chris Daughtry; Ace Young; Gregg Wattenberg; Mark Wilkerson
- Producer: Howard Benson

Daughtry singles chronology
"It's Not Over" (2006)	"Home" (2007)

Alternative cover
- UK CD-single cover

Music video
- "It's Not Over" on YouTube

"It's Not Over" is the debut single of American rock band Daughtry, taken from their self-titled debut studio album. It rose to number four on the Billboard Hot 100 and was certified platinum in May 2007 by the RIAA. It was listed in the top 10 digital selling songs of 2007, and it was certified 2× platinum for digital sales in 2019.

== Background ==
The song was written by Chris Daughtry, Ace Young (who was on American Idol with Daughtry), Gregg Wattenberg, Mark Wilkerson and produced by Howard Benson.

== Music video ==
=== Production ===
After much speculation on when and even if a video would be released, the video was finally released on AOL on January 10, 2007. The video was co-directed by Dean Karr and Jay Martin (Karr directed the performance scenes while Martin did the narrative scenes).

=== Plot ===
It begins with a man, played by Dennis Connolly, lying in bed while he has a flashback of himself gathering his personal effects upon release from prison. His girlfriend, played by Nina Sanchez, picks him up after his release; they hug and hold hands along the way. After a time they stop at a store. While he is inside, she has a flashback to when she first heard the news of his arrest, and we see that she was pregnant at the time. Dennis gets back in the car with a stuffed rabbit. They then arrive at her home, and there is a young girl inside, presumably the couple's daughter. Nina explains something to the girl while he waits outside. Dennis enters and gives the toy to his daughter, whom he has never met before. After a reluctant moment, the two hug.

The video cuts back to the couple lying in bed, and they seem to be distant; when he attempts to touch her, she pulls away. Intercut with this scene is Dennis looking for a job, which proves to be unsuccessful. He walks by and enters several stores, none of which are hiring. He passes a jewelry store, and all the recent positive events flash before him: his release, his daughter, and a rosary. He then notices a "Help Wanted" sign and inquires inside the garage; he gets the job as a car mechanic. He again passes the jewelry store, and sees brief flashes of the couple making love, his booking photos and a cross; he hides his face so the owner does not recognize him, implying that he was arrested for trying to rob the jewelry store. He is then working in the shop, apparently now employed. One night, as his girlfriend waits for him — visibly upset — Dennis is shown entering the jewelry store, looking at first as if he is going to rob it again. When he finally arrives home, Nina opens the door wondering where he's been, Dennis drops to one knee and proposes to her with a wedding ring; Nina is overjoyed, and the video ends with the two embracing.

Intercut throughout the video are scenes with scenes of the band playing the song in an immaculate looking grand room, it is of the main atrium of the Surrogate's Courthouse in New York City.

== Reception ==
=== Critical ===
Most critics found "It's Not Over" to be catchy and a solid first single. Billboard magazine called "It's Not Over" a "tight, focused and ready to rock your face off" single that "overflows with harmonies and axe leads that suck you in out of the box." Entertainment Weekly found the song "ridiculously catchy". Daniel Wolfe of About.com said the band does "a great job of telling the story of a relationship gone wrong," ultimately giving the song three and a half out of five stars.

On December 6, 2007, the song was nominated for Best Rock Song and Best Rock Performance by a Duo or Group with Vocal for the 50th Annual Grammy Awards.

=== Commercial ===
The single debuted fairly high on the Billboard Hot 100 at number 65 in late November 2006, partly due to the song already reaching the top 40 on iTunes. It went on to become a top five single for the band, peaking at number four on the Billboard Hot 100. It has also become a number one single for the band on the Adult Top 40 chart and on the American Top 40 countdown. The main version of the song has sold 2,103,000 copies in the United States as of April 2010, and the combined sales of different versions of the song exceeded three million.

On the international scene, the song, along with the album, appeared in the New Zealand RIANZ Singles Chart, the song debuting at number 38 on the Singles Chart, and the album debuting at number 17 on the Albums Chart. The single made the top 10 in New Zealand. The single was to be released in the UK on August 6, 2007, but was deleted at the last minute. In the Philippines, the single placed number two in the 2007 Magic 89.9 Yearender Countdown after spending more than a month at the top spot in the weekly countdown, behind Elliot Yamin's "Wait for You".

In the August 2007 issue of Guitar World magazine, a full transcription as well as pedal settings was featured for this song. The pedal settings, for the BOSS CE-5 Chorus Ensemble, ML-2 Metal Core and CS-3 Compression/Sustainer, allow readers to get the actual sound of the song as it appears on the Daughtry record.

== Track listing ==
1. "It's Not Over" (album version)
2. "It's Not Over" (acoustic)

== Charts ==
=== Weekly charts ===
Weekly chart performance for "It's Not Over"
Chart (2006–2007)	Peak position
Australia (ARIA)	22
Austria (Ö3 Austria Top 40)	65
Canada Hot 100 (Billboard)	9
Canada CHR/Top 40 (Billboard)	4
Canada Hot AC (Billboard)	1
Canada Rock (Billboard)	13
Germany (GfK)	38
Netherlands (Dutch Top 40)	22
Netherlands (Single Top 100)	53
New Zealand (Recorded Music NZ)	8
Switzerland (Schweizer Hitparade)	77
UK Singles (Official Charts)	128
US Billboard Hot 100	4
US Adult Contemporary (Billboard)	18
US Adult Pop Airplay (Billboard)	1
US Alternative Airplay (Billboard)	17
US Mainstream Rock Airplay (Billboard)	5
US Pop Airplay (Billboard)	1

=== Year-end charts ===
Year-end chart performance for "It's Not Over"
Chart (2007)	Position
Australia (ARIA)	80
US Billboard Hot 100	17
US Adult Contemporary (Billboard)	40
US Adult Top 40 (Billboard)	2
US Mainstream Rock (Billboard)	22

== Certifications ==
Certifications for "It's Not Over"
Region	Certification	Certified units/sales
Canada (Music Canada)	Platinum	40,000^{*}
New Zealand (RMNZ)	Platinum	30,000^{‡}
United States (RIAA)	2× Platinum	2,000,000^{‡}
United States (RIAA) Mastertone	Gold	500,000^{*}
^{*} Sales figures based on certification alone.^{‡} Sales+streaming figures based on certification alone.

== Release history ==
Release dates for "It's Not Over"
Region	Date	Label	Ref.
United States	November 21, 2006	RCA	
United Kingdom	August 6, 2007	RCA	
