= Chris Daughtry =

American musician (born 1979)

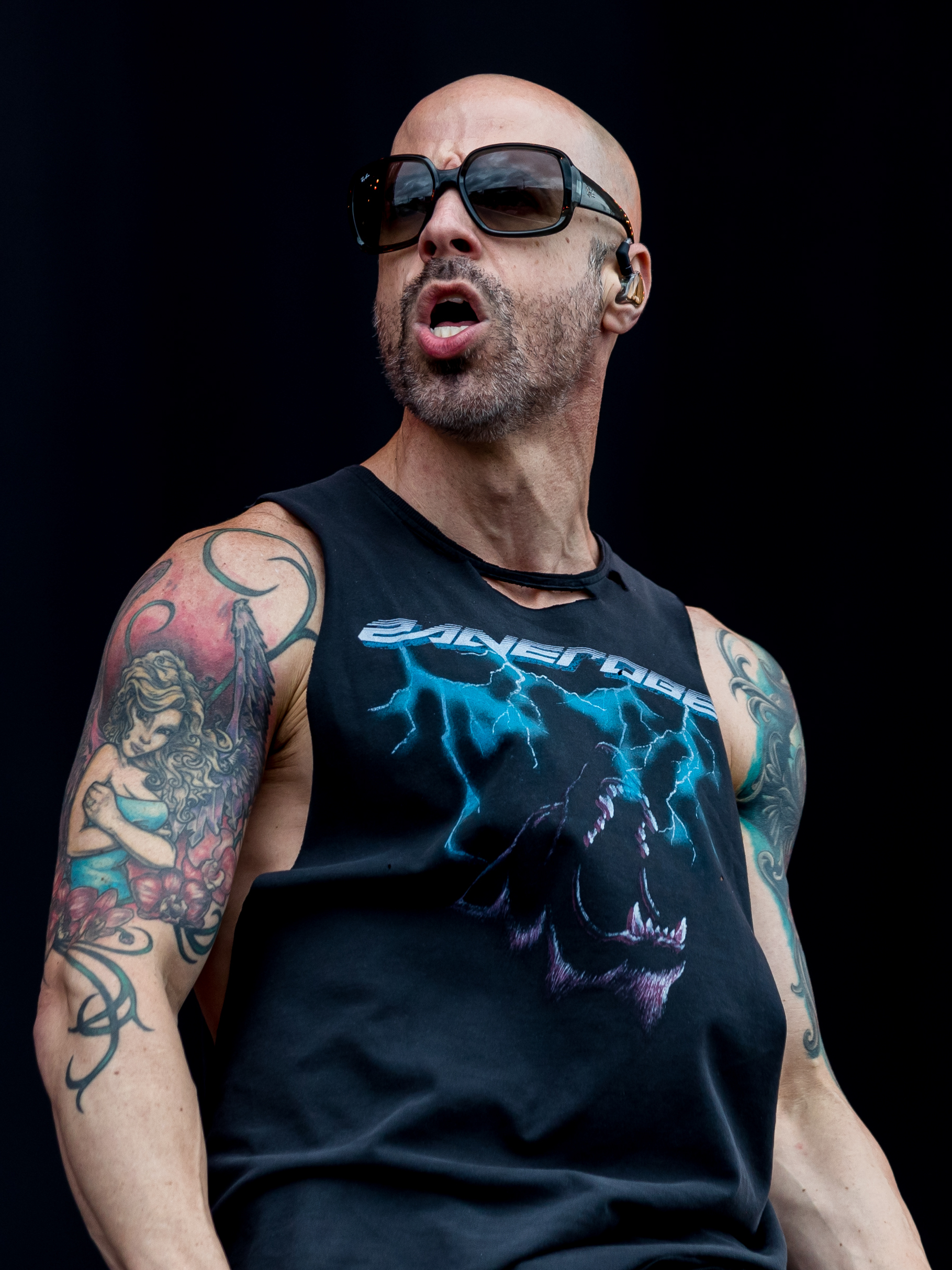
- Daughtry in 2022

Background information
- Born: Christopher Adam Daughtry; December 26, 1979 (age 46); Roanoke Rapids, North Carolina, U.S.
- Origin: Lasker, North Carolina, U.S.
- Genres: Rock; pop rock
- Occupations: Singer; songwriter; musician; illustrator; actor
- Instruments: Vocals; guitar
- Years active: 1999–present
- Member of: Daughtry
- Formerly of: Absent Element; Cadence
- Website: daughtryofficial.com

Christopher Adam Daughtry (/ˈdɔːtri/; born December 26, 1979) is an American singer, songwriter, musician, actor, and comic book artist. He is the lead vocalist and a guitarist for the rock band Daughtry, which he formed after placing fourth on the fifth season of American Idol. Released by RCA Records, Daughtry's self-titled debut album became the fastest selling debut rock album in Nielsen SoundScan history, selling more than one million copies within five weeks of release, and music's top-selling album of 2007. The album was recorded before the band was officially formed, making him the only official member present on the album.

In its ninth week of release, Daughtry reached number one on the Billboard chart. Chris Daughtry is the third most successful American Idol contestant in terms of record sales, behind Kelly Clarkson and Carrie Underwood who both won their respective seasons. At the 50th Grammy Awards, the band was nominated for Best Rock Song for the single "It's Not Over".

Since the band's first album, Chris Daughtry has collaborated with several artists, including Slash, Sevendust, Theory of a Deadman, Chad Kroeger, Brad Arnold, Vince Gill, and Carlos Santana. He is known for his powerful vocal belting technique and wide vocal range.

== Early life ==
Chris Daughtry was born in Roanoke Rapids, North Carolina on December 26, 1979, and raised in Lasker, North Carolina, until he was 14. His parents, Sandra and James "Pete" Daughtry, reside in Palmyra, Virginia, where Daughtry grew up before he relocated to McLeansville, outside of Greensboro. Daughtry attended Fluvanna County High School in Palmyra, graduating in 1998.

At age 16, Daughtry started taking singing seriously as a musician. He took guitar lessons from blues rock guitarist Matt Jagger at Stacy's Music store in Charlottesville and Mark Ebert from Laurinburg, North Carolina. He sought advice from Andy Waldeck (frontman for Earth to Andy) who is credited first on his debut album. He performed with rock bands during his time in high school at local venues, opening for his future bandmate Brian Craddock's band My Dog Lucy and Matt Jagger. During high school, he appeared in two stage productions: The Wiz and Peter Pan.

== Career ==
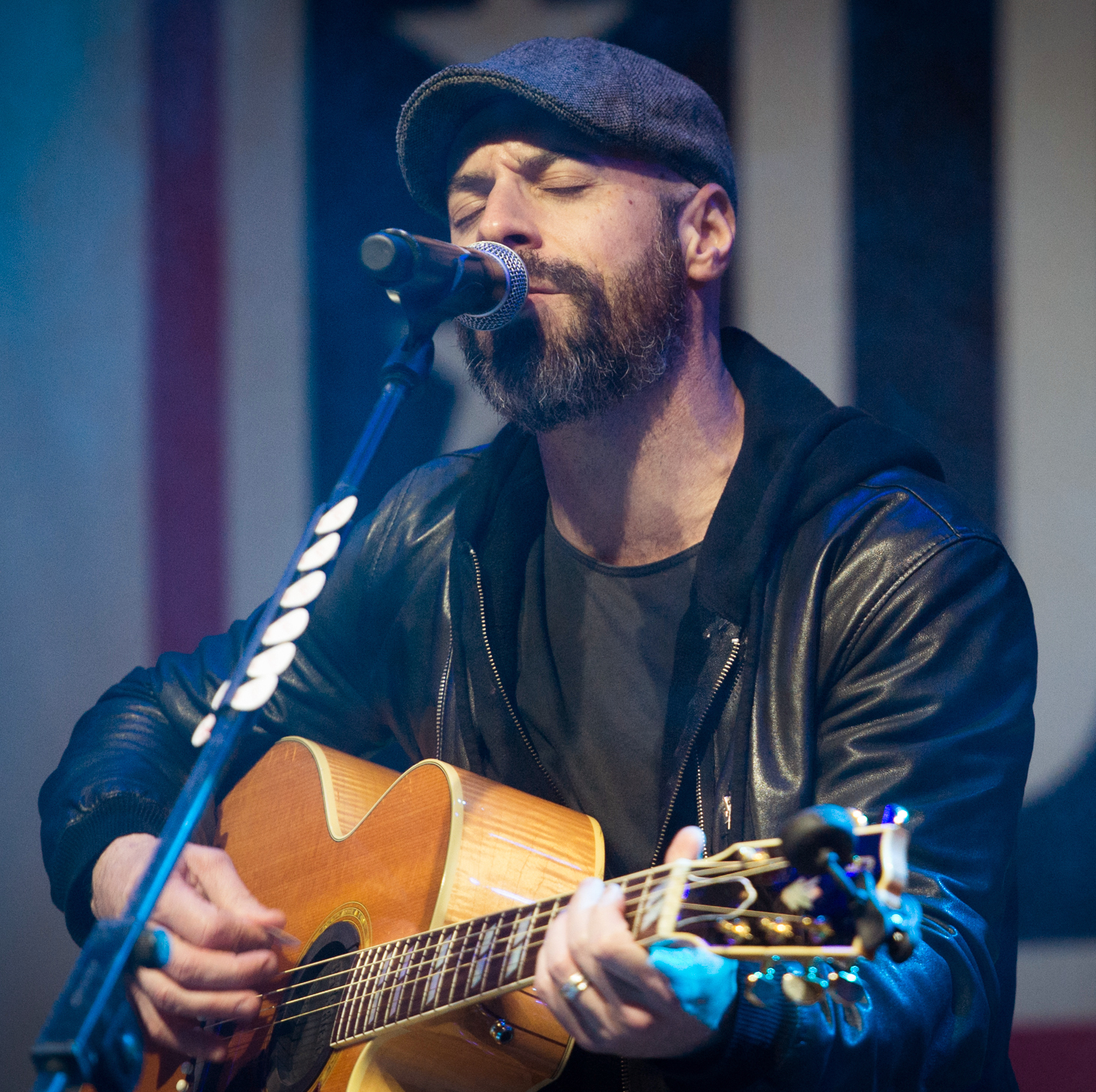
Daughtry performing in 2015

=== Cadence ===
Daughtry's high school band went by the name of Cadence. He sang lead vocals and played rhythm guitar. They produced one album, All Eyes on You (1999), a rarity that can sometimes be found on eBay.

=== Absent Element ===
The band Absent Element consisted of Daughtry on lead vocals and guitar, Mark Perry on lead guitar, Scott Crawford on drums and Ryan Andrews on bass. Absent Element released Uprooted in 2005. This release contains the songs "Conviction" and "Breakdown", which Daughtry later combined and re-recorded as the song "Breakdown" for the album Daughtry.

In 2005, Chris Daughtry auditioned for the CBS singing contest Rock Star: INXS. He did not make the cut for the live performances. Former Daughtry drummer Joey Barnes was at the same audition and made the cut only to drop out of the running due to disagreements regarding the contract.

=== American Idol ===
Daughtry auditioned for American Idol in Denver, Colorado, with The Box Tops' "The Letter"; he was portrayed as a young rocker with Southern and hard rock influences. He passed the audition by a split decision: approved by Paula Abdul and Randy Jackson, disapproved by Simon Cowell. Cowell felt that Daughtry at that time was too robotic. After being given a Golden Ticket to Hollywood, he performed "The First Cut Is the Deepest", and sang "Emotion" during his trio performance with Ace Young and Bobby Bullard. The song for Daughtry's a cappella performance remained unknown until American Idol Rewind aired Season 5 Hollywood week, when it was shown that he sang Elton John's 'Your Song'.

Daughtry eventually made it to the Top 24. On March 1, 2006, Daughtry's "raw" performance of Fuel's "Hemorrhage (In My Hands)" received critical acclaim by all three judges. On March 3, 2006, Jackson stated in an interview that Daughtry had been offered the opportunity to become Fuel's new lead singer, as the band was at the time without a lead singer. At a welcome home party, Daughtry said he had declined the offer, but, he said, "he'd still like to work with them somewhere down the road."

Daughtry's March 21 performance caused controversy when he sang a minor-key rendition of Johnny Cash's "I Walk the Line", based on a cover of the song by the band Live originally recorded for the 2001 tribute album Good Rockin' Tonight: The Legacy of Sun Records. Neither Daughtry nor the judges (who uniformly praised the performance) noted the Live version, making it appear to some viewers and critics that Daughtry was trying to pass off the arrangement as his own. In an interview with Entertainment Weekly, Daughtry defended himself, saying "It wasn't my doing. You say a lot of things in the [pretaped] interview, and when editing gets involved, things get cut out for time constraints. I did mention in my interview that I'm doing a different version from a band I totally respect. The lead singer of Live, Ed Kowalczyk, called me to say, 'Man, don't listen to that.'...It was really cool to get that kind of respect." On August 2, 2008, at the Tom's River Fest in Tom's River NJ, Daughtry, Kowalczyk, and Live performed Live's rendition of "I Walk the Line" together.

Chris Daughtry was in the final four on May 10, 2006, and found himself in the bottom two with Katharine McPhee. When asked by host Ryan Seacrest who should be leaving, Cowell expressed that he believed that McPhee should be eliminated. Seacrest then announced that Daughtry was eliminated. Seacrest asked Daughtry if he was surprised. A stunned Daughtry could only utter, "A little, yeah." The media grabbed hold of the surprise elimination and there was some controversy regarding the accuracy of the vote count on the night Daughtry was eliminated. The vote-tallying website DialIdol, however, predicted that Daughtry was the lowest vote-getter for the week. In an interview after his elimination, Daughtry said that he thought he got voted off because his fans were "overconfident" that he would be safe, so they did not call and vote. Later, he stated the best piece of advice he ever received was, "Don't believe your own hype," a possible nod toward his surprise American Idol elimination.

During the Season Five finale on May 24, 2006, at the Kodak Theatre in Hollywood, Daughtry performed the song "Mystery" with the band Live. Live's version of the song was later available for download on the band's MySpace.com profile with Chris Daughtry performing backup vocals.

American Idol Season 5 performances and results
Week	Theme	Song	Artist	Status
Audition	Free Choice	"The Letter"	The Box Tops	Advanced
Hollywood	Group Performance	"Emotion" with Ace Young and Bobby Bullard	Samantha Sang	Advanced
Semifinals; Top 24	Free Choice	"Wanted Dead or Alive"	Bon Jovi	Safe
Semifinals; Top 20	Free Choice	"Hemorrhage (In My Hands)"	Fuel	Safe
Semifinals; Top 16	Free Choice	"Broken"	Seether feat. Amy Lee	Safe
Top 12	Songs of Stevie Wonder	"Higher Ground"	Stevie Wonder	Safe
Top 11	Hits of the 1950s	"I Walk the Line"	Johnny Cash	Safe
Top 10	21st Century Hits	"What If"	Creed	Safe
Top 9	Country Music	"Making Memories of Us"	Keith Urban	Safe
Top 8	Music of Queen	"Innuendo"	Queen	Safe
Top 7	The Great American Songbook	"What a Wonderful World"	Louis Armstrong	Bottom 2
Top 6	Greatest Love Songs	"Have You Ever Really Loved a Woman?"	Bryan Adams	Safe^{1}
Top 5	Year They Were Born; Billboard Top 10	"Renegade" "I Dare You"	Styx; Shinedown	Safe
Top 4	Songs of Elvis	"Suspicious Minds" "A Little Less Conversation"	Elvis Presley	Eliminated
^Note 1 When Ryan Seacrest announced the results that night, Daughtry was placed in the top two.

=== Post-Idol events ===
After leaving American Idol, Daughtry traveled the talk show circuit, which has become commonplace for non-winners as American Idol progressed through the years. He made appearances on The Tonight Show, Total Request Live, and The Today Show. He also appeared on Live with Regis and Kelly and The Ellen DeGeneres Show, in which he performed "Wanted Dead or Alive". In a later episode of the show in which Ellen interviewed former presidents Bill Clinton and George H. W. Bush, who were collaborating on the Bush-Clinton Katrina fund, she even jokingly asked if anything could be done about Chris Daughtry's elimination. Chris Daughtry was asked to audition as the lead vocalist for Fuel and, though incredibly flattered, he declined the offer in order to form his own band.

On December 18, 2019, he was named the runner-up on the second season of The Masked Singer where he competed as "Rottweiler".

=== Daughtry ===
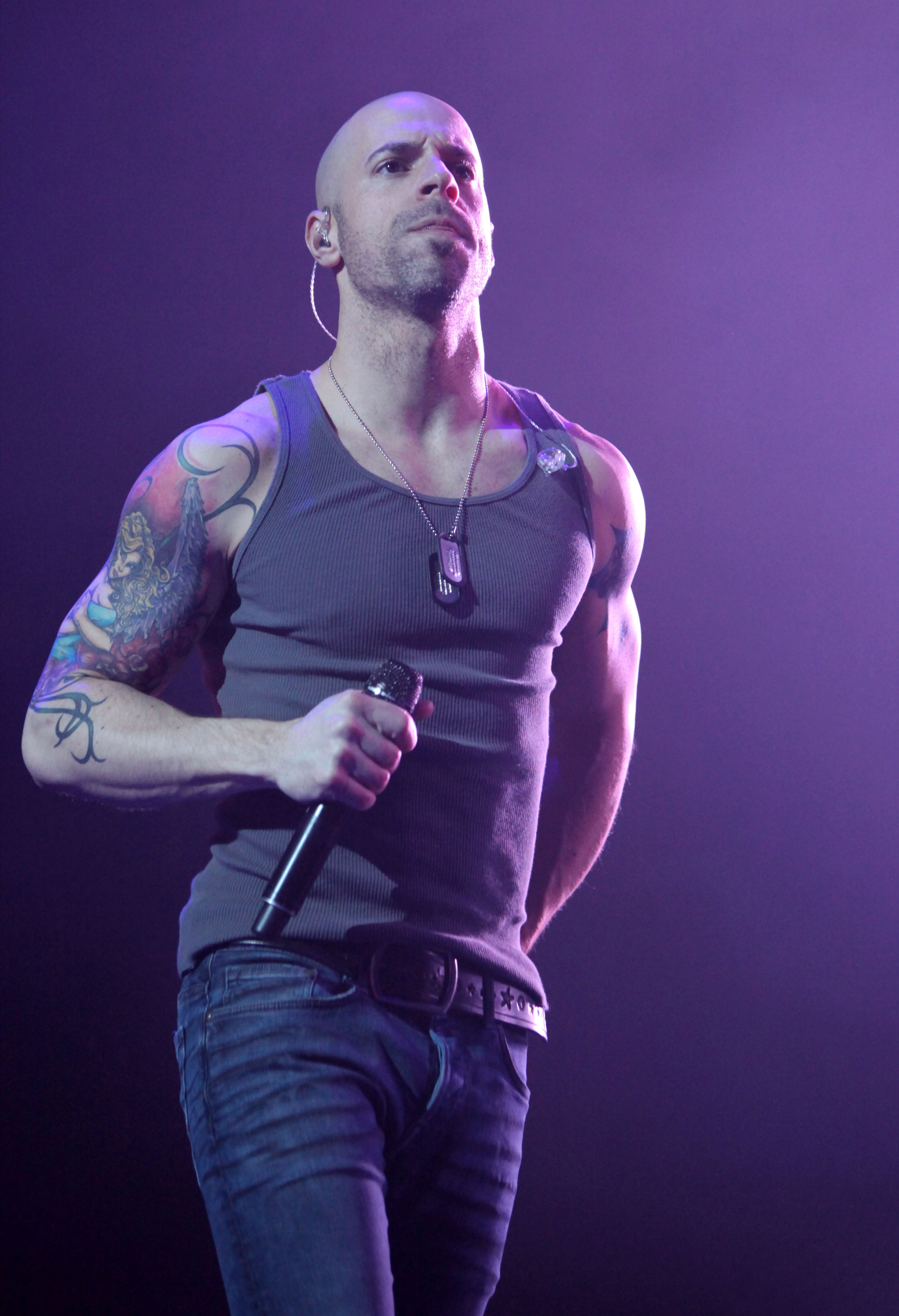
Daughtry in 2013

For the week of June 10, 2006, Chris Daughtry's cover of "Wanted Dead or Alive" charted at number 43 on the Billboard Hot 100, being named the Hot Shot Debut of the week. On July 10, 2006, it was announced that Daughtry had signed with 19 Entertainment and RCA Records and began working on an album that was to be released in November. It was also announced that, like season 4 rocker Constantine Maroulis, he would be forming his own band. His band was formed under the name Daughtry, after the singer's last name. The band currently consists of Chris Daughtry, guitarists Josh Steely and Brian Craddock (the latter replaced former guitarist Jeremy Brady in 2007), bassist Andy Waldeck replacing Josh Paul at the end of 2012 (formerly of Suicidal Tendencies), and drummer Robin Diaz (who replaced former drummer Joey Barnes in 2010). In 2012, Elvio Fernandes joined Daughtry playing keyboard and singing backup vocals. Daughtry's debut album was released on November 21, 2006. Chris Daughtry reportedly told US Weekly that the band's album "would not be... pop." The first single off Daughtry, "It's Not Over", was released November 21, 2006. The album reached number one in Billboard Charts with his debut album. He joins Kelly Clarkson and Scotty McCreery as the only contestants to reach number one in Billboard 200. The album featured Velvet Revolver and former Guns N' Roses guitarist Slash, who performed the guitar solo on the eventual single "What I Want".

Beginning on March 14, 2007, on every episode of American Idol's sixth season's results show, Daughtry's song "Home" was played every time a participant was knocked out of the competition, as each of the losing contestants was asked to look at their own journeys. Additionally, on the final competition on May 22, 2007, Daughtry performed the song live at the end of the show. It also became the song for the eliminating home team for the 2007 NBA Playoffs. In March, Daughtry performed during the Final Four round of the 2007 NCAA Men's Division I Basketball Tournament. On May 27, 2007, Daughtry performed at the 2007 Indianapolis 500.

On September 19, 2007, on ABC, Viva Las Vegas premiered, which was a tribute to Elvis Presley's career in Las Vegas. The band performed an acoustic version of "Suspicious Minds". On November 18, 2007, the band was the winner of multiple awards at the "2007 American Music Awards" (ABC Television). The winning categories were: 1) Pop or Rock: Favorite Album – Daughtry; 2) Adult Contemporary Music: Favorite Artist; 3) Favorite Breakthrough Artist. On December 6, 2007, the band was nominated for four 50th Annual Grammy Awards: Best Rock Album for Daughtry, Best Rock Song for "It's Not Over", Best Pop Performance by a Duo or Group With Vocal for "Home", and Best Rock Performance by a Duo or Group with Vocals for "It's Not Over".

On May 6, 2009, Daughtry performed "No Surprise", the debut single for their forthcoming album, on American Idol. Chris Daughtry wrote the song with Nickelback vocalist Chad Kroeger. The album on which "No Surprise" appears, Daughtry's second album titled Leave This Town, was released on July 14, 2009. Chris Daughtry made history with its release by becoming the first American Idol alumnus to have two consecutive number one albums. Leave This Town was the first Daughtry album that they wrote and recorded as a band, as their self-titled album was recorded before the band was officially formed and featured only Chris Daughtry as an official member.

On July 2, 2009, Daughtry performed an acoustic cover of Lady Gaga's "Poker Face" and has received over 25 million views on YouTube.

The band Daughtry kicked off a tour with Lifehouse and Cavo on August 2, 2009, in Orlando, Florida. The final show of the tour was in Tempe, Arizona on October 13, 2009. The band played a show in Chris Daughtry's hometown of Greensboro, North Carolina on November 12, 2009.

On December 31, 2010, Daughtry tweeted that the band will be working on a new album soon. On March 7, 2011, he tweeted that the album sounds nothing like the previous two and will feature a song titled "Spaceship". There will be another song on the record called "Rescue Me", which the band has performed on stage in New Jersey. The album would be released on November 21, 2011, according to Daughtry's Twitter.

Daughtry has written and recorded a song for the soundtrack to the video game Batman: Arkham City. On September 5, 2011, Daughtry tweeted that the song "Drown In You" is exclusive to the soundtrack and will not be featured on his upcoming album.

On September 15, 2011, Daughtry posted a new song "Renegade" on his official website. The newest single "Crawling Back to You" was posted on the website and released on September 19, 2011, from the album Break the Spell.

The first single from their fourth album, Baptized, is "Waiting for Superman".

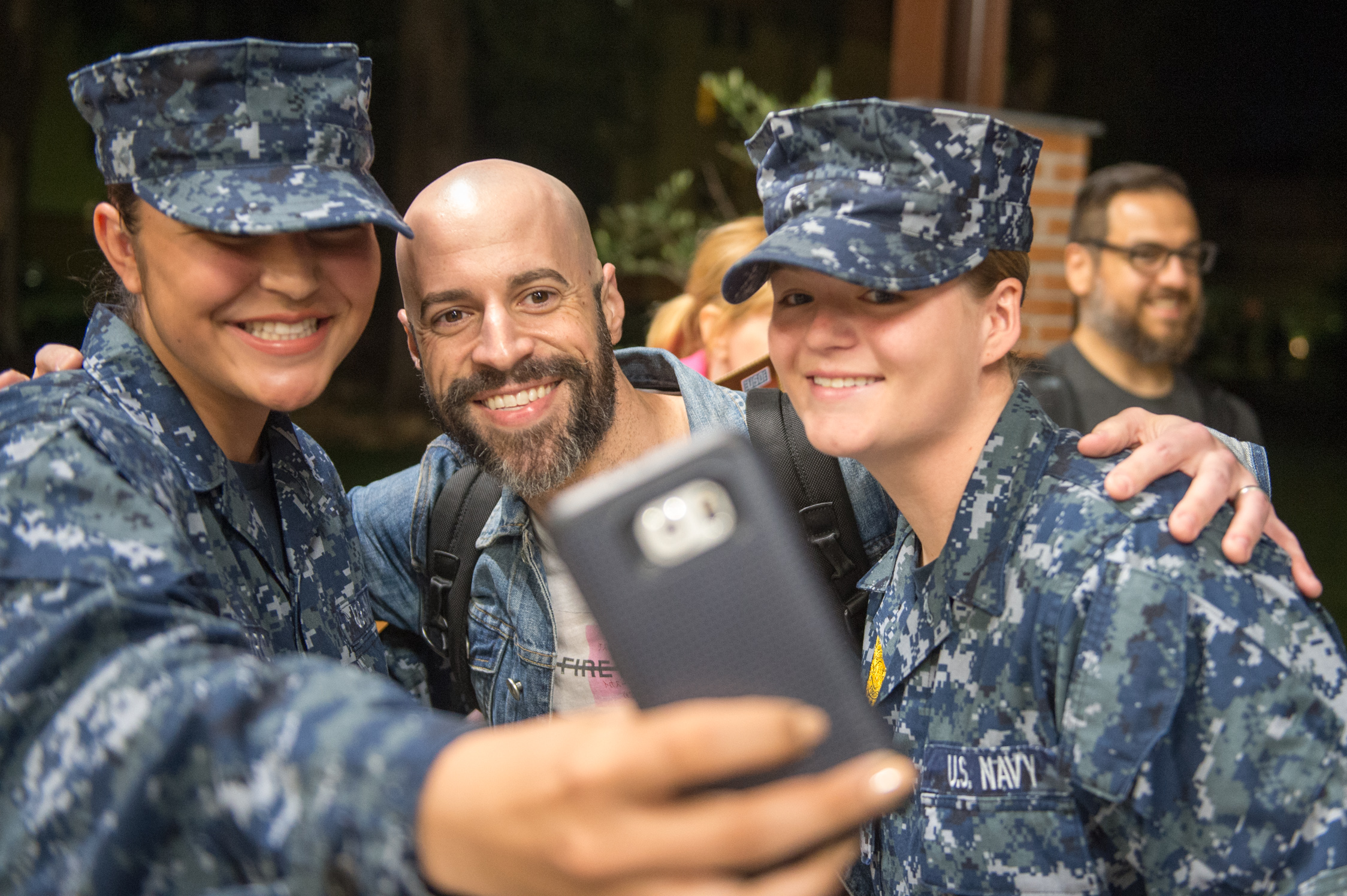
Daughtry during a United Service Organizations visit to Naval Air Station Sigonella

On February 12, 2016, Daughtry released their album It's Not Over...The Hits So Far. On July 27, 2018, the band released its album Cage to Rattle. On September 17, 2021, Daughtry released the album Dearly Beloved.

In August 2023, Daughtry released a new single, "Artificial". On February 9, 2024, "Artificial" reached number one on Billboard's Mainstream Rock Airplay chart.

In a January 2024 interview with Tommy Behnke of The Daily Herald, Daughtry said that he grew tired of producing softer-sounding music at the recommendation of RCA Records that he did not always feel passionate about making. He said that Big Machine Label Group, which his band signed with in August 2023, supports his group's vision for a harder-sounding future and that they are working on a new record.

=== Collaborations ===
In 2008, Chris Daughtry provided vocals on a Sevendust track entitled "The Past" on their album Chapter VII: Hope & Sorrow. He had previously stated he had become friends with the members of the band. Alter Bridge members Myles Kennedy and Mark Tremonti appear on the same album. That same year, Chris Daughtry also provides vocals on the Theory of a Deadman song "By the Way", which is featured on their third album Scars & Souvenirs. Still in 2008, he appeared on the song "Slow Down" on the album Revelation by Christian rock band Third Day. In 2009, the band Daughtry collaborated with Timbaland on their song "Long Way Down" from the album Shock Value II. During this time, Chris Daughtry also co-wrote three songs with band Day of Fire for their 2010 album Losing All, including the track "Hello Heartache".

In 2010, he and Jason Wade performed a duet on Lifehouse's fifth studio album Smoke & Mirrors on the song "Had Enough". Chris Daughtry also co-wrote the song "Send Me All Your Angels" for American Idol season 8 winner Kris Allen's debut album. He later performed lead vocals on the cover Def Leppard's song "Photograph" with Carlos Santana on Santana's album called Guitar Heaven: The Greatest Guitar Classics of All Time. It was released on September 21, 2010, with a performance on the Dancing with the Stars results show that day.

=== Acting ===
Daughtry made his acting debut in the 100th episode of CSI: New York. In March 2015, it was announced that Daughtry would play a rocker with a drug addiction and write original music for a new dramedy, Studio City, though it was announced in May 2015 that the show was not picked up by Fox. He next portrayed Judas Iscariot in the Biblical live version of The Passion, which aired on March 20, 2016.

Daughtry portrayed Hugo Strange in the Batman fan film, Batman: Dying Is Easy, released on YouTube on March 10, 2021.

Year	Title	Role	Notes
2006	American Idol	Himself (contestant)	Season 5, 4th place
2008	CSI: NY	Mac Taylor	Season 5, episode 8 "My Name Is Mac Taylor"
2014	Star Wars: Cantina Bands	Chris Darthtry	CollegeHumorOriginal
2015	Studio City	Keith Rhodes	
2016	The Passion: Live	Judas	Live musical
2016	Trollz	Counselor Olaf	voice only
2019	The Masked Singer	Rottweiler/Himself	Season 2 runner-up
2021	Batman: Dying Is Easy	Hugo Strange	Fan film
2023	Family Guy	Himself	Season 22, episode 5 "Baby, It's Cold Inside"

=== Comics ===
In addition to his careers in music and acting, Daughtry is an illustrator who specializes in illustrating comic books. Daughtry is a longtime fan of Batman; Daughtry's first published comic book art appeared as a variant cover to Batman (Volume 2) #50.

== Personal life ==
In a segment on the 2006 season of American Idol (before singing "Broken" by Seether), Daughtry revealed that he is balding and made the decision to shave his head completely in order to retain an aesthetically pleasing appearance. He has been married to Deanna Daughtry since November 11, 2000. He has four children: two stepchildren, Hannah (died November 2021) and Griffin, and twins Adalynn Rose and Noah James. In a December 2007 interview with Gibson Lifestyle, Daughtry said, "I used to call [my wife] and just quickly throw in the towel. But I've found that the less I say and the more I actually listen to her, and just be there without actually being there, is the best thing I can do. As a man, I always feel like I need to say something. Sometimes I have to stop myself because all I want to do is call and tell her about how much awesome stuff is going on in my life, and, you know, her day is sucking hard. I could write a book on it, I'm serious."

Daughtry and fellow Idol contestant Ace Young have been friends since they met at the show's Denver auditions, and even periodically shared an apartment as finalists. Young said they clicked because they shared similar upbringings and were both "big on family." Ryan Seacrest had also dubbed them "the Ben Affleck and Matt Damon of the season" when the two were placed in the "bottom 2" together upon Young's elimination. In the final episode of the season, a clip of them in a "Best Male Bonding" segment was also shown.

In 2019, Daughtry was on the second season of The Masked Singer as "The Rottweiler" and was named the runner-up. He also played for the "Home" roster during the NBA All-Star Celebrity Game.

== Influences ==
Chris Daughtry's musical influences include Creed, Bush, Live, Pearl Jam, Alice in Chains, Soundgarden, Stone Temple Pilots, Journey, Bon Jovi, and Fuel. He states that he grew up on rock and hard rock music.

== Legacy ==
On October 18, 2018, Daughtry was inducted into the North Carolina Music Hall of Fame.

Todd Pettengill stated in a January 2024 interview with The Daily Herald that Daughtry could be considered America’s last rock star.

== Discography ==
=== Cadence ===
- All Eyes on You (1999)

=== Absent Element ===
- Uprooted (2005)

=== Daughtry ===
- Daughtry (2006)
- Leave This Town (2009)
- Break the Spell (2011)
- Baptized (2013)
- Cage to Rattle (2018)
- Dearly Beloved (2021)
- Shock to the System (Part One) (2024)
- Shock to the System (Part Two) (2025)
- A Complete Shock to the System (2025)

=== Other works ===
Year	Artist	Album	Track(s)	Position
2007	12 Stones	Anthem for the Underdog	"Broken Road"	Songwriting
2008	Sevendust	Chapter VII: Hope & Sorrow	"The Past"	Lead vocals
2008	Theory of a Deadman	Scars & Souvenirs	"By the Way"	Backing vocals
2008	Third Day	Revelation	"Slow Down"	Backing vocals
2009	Timbaland	Shock Value II	"Long Way Down"	Lead vocals
2009	Kris Allen	Kris Allen	"Send Me All Your Angels"	Songwriting
2009	Allison Iraheta	Just Like You	"Don't Wanna Be Wrong"	Songwriting
2010	Day of Fire	Losing All	"Hello Heartache" "When I See You" "Airplane"	Songwriting
2010	Lifehouse	Smoke & Mirrors	"Had Enough"	Backing vocals and Songwriting
2010	Carlos Santana	Guitar Heaven: The Greatest Guitar Classics of All Time	"Photograph"	Lead vocals
2012	Various artists	Pacific Standard Time	"4 A.M."	Lead vocals
2013	Colton Dixon	A Messenger	"Rise"	Songwriting
2024	Bad Wolves	Die About It	"Hungry for Life"	Lead vocals
2024	Louis York	Songs with Friends	"Catch a Feeling"	Lead vocals
2025	Nothing More	Carnal	"Freefall"	Lead Vocals

== Explanatory notes ==
a: The CD of Daughtry's former band, Absent Element, began to float around the internet during the 2006 season of American Idol.
