= Daughtry discography =

Band discography

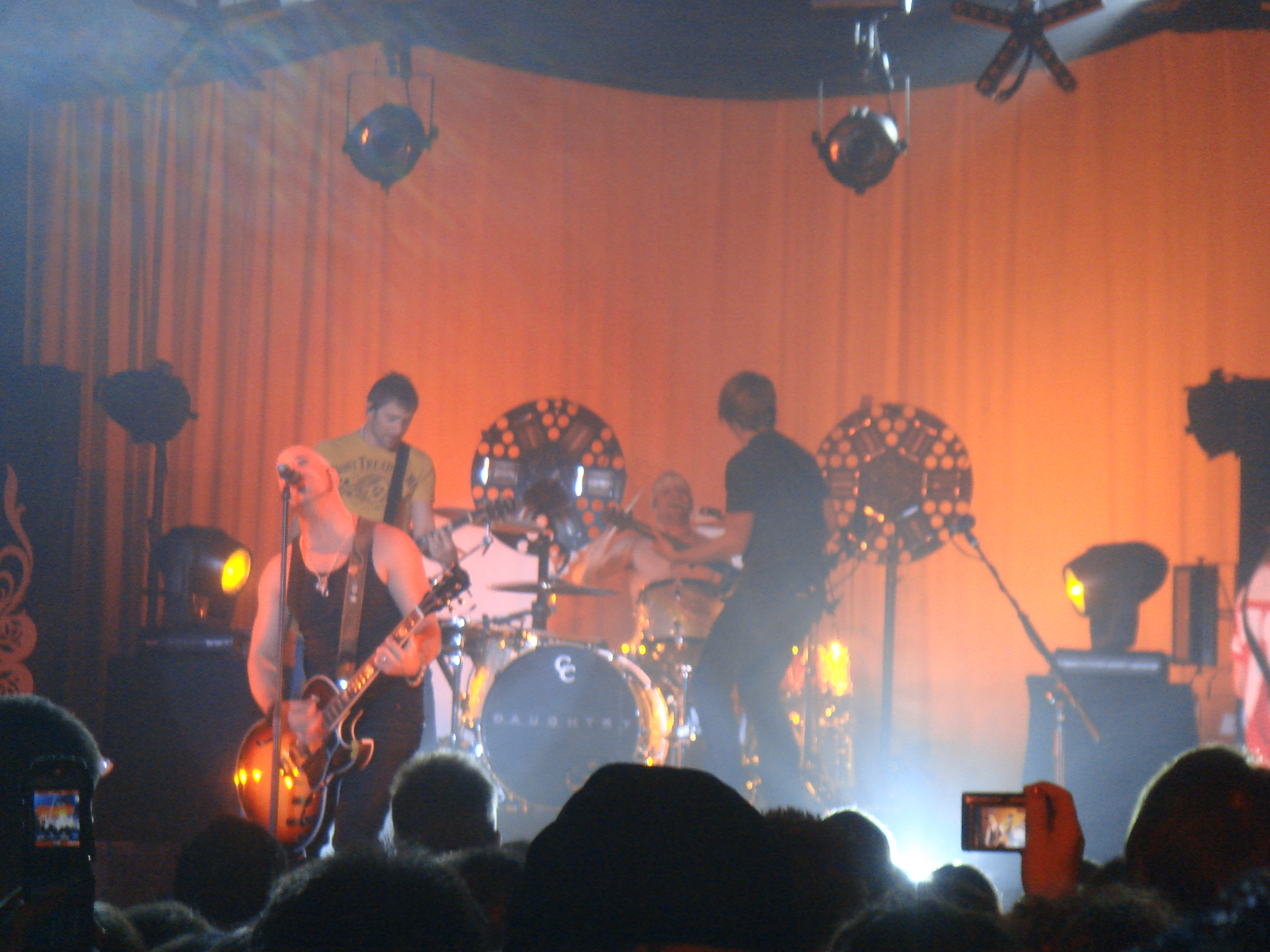
- Daughtry performing at Nokia Theatre Times Square in 2007
- Studio albums: 6
- Extended plays: 3
- Compilation albums: 2
- Singles: 28
- Promotional singles: 17
- Music videos: 26

This is the discography of American rock band Daughtry. The band was created following the participation of singer Chris Daughtry in the fifth season of American Idol and has so far released 6 studio albums, 3 extended plays, 2 compilation album, 28 singles, 17 promotional singles and 26 music videos.

The eponymous first album Daughtry was released on November 21, 2006, and was a commercial success. It debuted at number two, sold 304,000 units in its first week, and was the fastest-selling rock album in SoundScan history. It has since been certified 4× Platinum in the US, and has sold more than seven million worldwide. It produced five consecutive singles in the top five of the Adult Top 40 radio charts; three of these, "It's Not Over", "Home", and "Over You" have each sold over one or more million copies in the US.

The second album, Leave This Town, was released on July 14, 2009 and reached number one on its debut week and sold 269,000 units in its first week. It has since sold over a million copies in the US. This album has spawned three top 10 songs on the Adult Pop chart: "No Surprise", "Life After You", and "September". The band's third studio album, Break the Spell, was released in November 2011. It debuted at number eight on the Billboard 200 and was certified Gold by the RIAA for selling over 500,000 units in the United States. In November 2013, the band released their fourth studio album, Baptized, which debuted at number six on the Billboard 200. In February 2016, the band released their greatest hits album, It's Not Over...The Hits So Far, which debuted at number 43 on the Billboard 200 and number six on the US rock chart.

The band released their fifth studio album Cage to Rattle in July 2018. A sixth studio album Dearly Beloved was released in September 2021 through Dogtree Records.

== Albums ==
=== Studio albums ===
List of albums, with selected chart positions, sales figures and certifications
Title	Album details	Peak chart positions										Sales	Certifications
Title	Album details	US	US Rock	AUS	CAN	GER	IRE	JAP	NZ	SWE	UK	Sales	Certifications
Daughtry	Released: November 21, 2006; Label: RCA, 19; Formats: CD, digital download	1	1	38	8	40	38	106	16	17	13	US: 5,040,000 (as of 2015); WW: 7,000,000 (as of 2009)	RIAA: 6× Platinum; ARIA: Gold; BPI: Gold; MC: 2× Platinum; RMNZ: Platinum
Leave This Town	Released: July 14, 2009; Label: RCA, 19; Formats: CD, digital download	1	1	21	2	12	99	43	8	31	53	US: 1,329,000 (as of 2012)	RIAA: Platinum; BPI: Silver; MC: Platinum
Break the Spell	Released: November 21, 2011; Label: RCA, 19; Formats: CD, digital download	8	2	32	13	27	—	53	18	57	67	US: 513,000 (as of 2014)	RIAA: Gold; MC: Gold
Baptized	Released: November 19, 2013; Label: RCA, 19; Formats: CD, digital download	6	3	56	16	43	100	102	—	—	42	UK: 4,978 (as of 2013)	RIAA: Gold
Cage to Rattle	Released: July 27, 2018; Label: RCA, 19; Formats: CD, digital download, LP	10	2	40	40	37	—	—	—	—	14	US: 24,000	
Dearly Beloved	Released: September 17, 2021; Label: Dogtree, ADA; Formats: CD, digital download, LP	50	10	—	—	—	—	—	—	—	— (Note: Dearly Beloved did not enter the UK Albums Chart, but peaked at number 37 on the UK Albums Sales Chart.)		

=== Compilation albums ===
List of albums, with selected chart positions, sales figures and certifications
Title	Album details	Peak chart positions				Certifications
Title	Album details	US	US Rock	CAN	UK	Certifications
It's Not Over...The Hits So Far	Released: February 12, 2016; Label: RCA, 19; Formats: CD, digital download	43	6	95	88	BPI: Silver
Shock to the System (Deluxe)	Released: June 5, 2026; Label: Dogtree, Big Machine Rock; Formats: LP					
There and Back Again	Released: July 14, 2026; Label: Dogtree; Formats: Digital download					

== Extended plays ==
Title	EP details	Peak chart positions				Sales
Title	EP details	US	US Rock	UK Sales	UK Rock	Sales
Leave This Town: The B-Sides	Released: March 15, 2010 / May 10, 2011; Label: RCA; Formats: Digital download (2010), CD (2011)	70	17	—	—	US: 12,000 (as of 2011)
Shock to the System (Part One)	Released: September 27, 2024; Label: Dogtree, Big Machine Rock; Formats: CD, digital download, LP	— (Note: Shock to the System (Part One) did not enter the Billboard 200, but peaked at number 23 on the US Top Album Sales chart.)	—	— (Note: Shock to the System (Part One) did not enter the UK Albums Sales Chart, but peaked at number 30 on the UK Album Downloads Chart.)	—	
Shock to the System (Part Two)	Released: September 12, 2025; Label: Dogtree, Big Machine Rock; Formats: CD, digital download, LP	— (Note: Shock to the System (Part Two) did not enter the Billboard 200, but peaked at number 40 on the US Top Album Sales chart.)	—	76	13	US: 15,000

== Singles ==
List of singles, with selected chart positions and certifications, showing year released and album name
Title	Year	Peak chart positions									Certifications	Album
Title	Year	US	US Adult	US Pop	US AC	US Main	AUS	CAN	NZ	UK	Certifications	Album
"It's Not Over"	2006	4	1	1	18	5	22	9	8	128	RIAA: 2× Platinum; MC: Platinum; RMNZ: Platinum	Daughtry
"Home"	2007	5	1	3	1	—	—	7	23	190	RIAA: 3× Platinum; RMNZ: Gold	Daughtry
"What I Want" (featuring Slash)	2007	—	—	—	—	6	—	93	—	—		Daughtry
"Over You"	2007	18	3	4	16	—	—	16	26	—	RIAA: 2× Platinum; MC: Gold; RMNZ: Platinum	Daughtry
"Crashed"	2007	—	—	—	—	24	—	—	—	—		Daughtry
"Feels Like Tonight"	2008	24	1	12	5	—	—	30	—	—	RIAA: Platinum	Daughtry
"What About Now"	2008	18	3	19	3	—	—	17	—	11		Daughtry
"No Surprise"	2009	15	1	9	4	—	34	13	22	—	RIAA: Platinum; MC: Gold	Leave This Town
"Life After You"	2009	36	4	19	4	—	—	34	—	—	RIAA: Platinum	Leave This Town
"September"	2010	36	2	20	2	—	—	29	—	—	RIAA: Gold	Leave This Town
"Renegade"	2011	—	—	—	—	—	—	90	—	—		Break the Spell
"Crawling Back to You"	2011	41	6	—	14	—	—	36	—	—	RIAA: Platinum	Break the Spell
"Outta My Head"	2012	—	22	—	—	—	—	—	—	—		Break the Spell
"Start of Something Good"	2012	—	31	—	—	—	—	—	—	—		Break the Spell
"Waiting for Superman"	2013	66	11	40	15	—	—	51	—	80	RIAA: Platinum	Baptized
"Battleships"	2014	—	20	—	—	—	—	—	—	—		Baptized
"Torches"	2016	—	40	—	—	—	—	—	—	—		It's Not Over...The Hits So Far
"Deep End"	2018	—	21	—	—	—	—	—	—	—		Cage to Rattle
"As You Are"	2019	—	—	—	17	—	—	—	—	—		Cage to Rattle
"World on Fire"	2020	—	—	—	—	16	—	—	—	—		Dearly Beloved
"Heavy Is the Crown"	2021	—	—	—	—	4	—	—	—	—		Dearly Beloved
"Changes Are Coming"	2021	—	—	—	—	18	—	—	—	—		Dearly Beloved
"Separate Ways (Worlds Apart)" (featuring Lzzy Hale)	2023	—	—	—	—	5	—	— (Note: "Separate Ways (Worlds Apart)" did not enter the Billboard Canadian Hot 100, but peaked at number 21 on the Canadian Digital Song Sales chart.)	—	—		Non-album single
"Artificial"	2023	—	—	—	—	1	—	— (Note: "Artificial" did not enter the Billboard Canadian Hot 100, but peaked at number 14 on the Canada Rock chart.)	—	— (Note: "Artificial" did not enter the UK Singles Sales Chart, but peaked at number 100 on the UK Singles Downloads Chart.)		Shock to the System (Part One)
"Pieces"	2024	—	—	—	—	1	—	—	—	—		Shock to the System (Part One)
"The Dam"	2024	—	—	—	—	7	—	— (Note: "The Dam" did not enter the Billboard Canadian Hot 100, but peaked at number 23 on the Canada Rock chart.)	—	—		Shock to the System (Part One)
"The Bottom"	2025	—	—	—	—	1	—	—	—	—		Shock to the System (Part Two)
"Antidote"	2025	—	24	—	—	—	—	—	—	—		Shock to the System (Part Two)
"—" denotes a recording that did not chart or was not released in that territory.

=== As featured artist ===
List of singles, with selected chart positions, showing year released and album name
Title	Year	Peak chart positions			Album
Title	Year	US Main. Rock	US Hard Rock	US Rock Digi.	Album
"The Past" (Sevendust featuring Chris Daughtry)	2008	27	—	—	Chapter VII: Hope & Sorrow
"Photograph" (Santana featuring Chris Daughtry)	2010	—	—	30	Guitar Heaven: The Greatest Guitar Classics of All Time
"Freefall" (Nothing More featuring Chris Daughtry)	2025	1	18	—	Carnal
"—" denotes a recording that did not chart or was not released in that territory.

=== Promotional singles ===
List of singles, with selected chart positions, showing year released and album name
Title	Year	Peak chart positions		Album
Title	Year	US Rock Dig.	US Hard Rock Dig.	Album
"Call Your Name"	2010	—	—	Leave This Town
"Rescue Me"	2012	35	—	Break the Spell
"Long Live Rock & Roll"	2013	—	—	Baptized
"I'll Fight"	2014	—	—	Baptized
"Utopia"	2014	—	—	Utopia
"Witness" (stripped)	2015	—	—	Baptized
"Backbone"	2018	—	—	Cage to Rattle
"White Flag"	2018	—	—	Cage to Rattle
"Death of Me"	2018	—	—	Cage to Rattle
"Alive"	2019	1	—	Non-album single
"Hunger Strike" (featuring Lajon Witherspoon)	2021	—	22	Dearly Beloved
"Lioness"	2021	—	—	Dearly Beloved
"Dearly Beloved"	2021	—	—	Dearly Beloved
"Nervous"	2024	—	—	Shock to the System (Part One)
"The Reckoning"	2024	—	—	Shock to the System (Part One)
"Shock to the System"	2024	—	9	Shock to the System (Part One)
"The Day I Die"	2025	—	—	Shock to the System (Part Two)
"—" denotes a recording that did not chart or was not released in that territory.

== Other charted songs ==
Title	Year	Peak chart positions		Album
Title	Year	US	CAN	Album
"You Don't Belong"	2009	95	—	Leave This Town
"Tennessee Line"	2009	— (Note: "Tennessee Line" did not enter the Billboard Hot 100, but peaked at number 1 on the Bubbling Under Hot 100 Singles chart, which acts as a 25-song extension.)	—	Leave This Town
"One Last Chance"	2010	—	99	Leave This Town

== Guest appearances ==
The following are songs by other artists featuring Daughtry frontman Chris Daughtry, with the exception of "Long Way Down", "Drown In You" and "Waitin' for the Bus / Jesus Just Left Chicago" which feature the entire band.

Year	Title	With Artist	Album
2006	"Wanted Dead or Alive"	Various artists	American Idol Season 5: Encores
2008	"The Past"	Sevendust	Chapter VII: Hope & Sorrow
2008	"By the Way"	Theory of a Deadman	Scars & Souvenirs
2008	"Slow Down"	Third Day	Revelation
2009	"Long Way Down"	Timbaland	Shock Value II
2010	"Had Enough"	Lifehouse	Smoke & Mirrors
2010	"Photograph"	Santana	Guitar Heaven: The Greatest Guitar Classics of All Time
2011	"Drown In You"	Various artists	Batman: Arkham City soundtrack
2011	"Waitin' for the Bus / Jesus Just Left Chicago"	Various artists	ZZ Top: A Tribute from Friends
2012	"4 A.M."	Various artists	Pacific Standard Time EP
2013	"Never Die"	Various artists	NCIS: Los Angeles Soundtrack and Break the Spell (Japan edition)
2014	"Utopia"	Daughtry	Utopia
2016	"Wild Heart"	Adairs Run	Turn Back the Miles EP
2024	"Scars"	Papa Roach	Leave a Light On (Talk Away the Dark) EP
2024	"Hungry for Life"	Bad Wolves	Die About It
2025	"Freefall"	Nothing More	Carnal (deluxe edition)

== Music videos ==
Year	Song	Director(s)
2006	"It's Not Over"	Dean Karr and Jay Martin
2007	"Home"	Danny Clinch
2007	"Over You"	P.R. Brown
2007	"Crashed"	Trevor Pinnock
2008	"Feels Like Tonight"	Martin Weisz
2008	"What About Now"	Kevin Kerslake
2009	"No Surprise"	Nathan Cox
2009	"Life After You"	Paul Minor
2010	"September"	Chris Sims
2011	"Crawling Back to You"	Laurent Briet
2011	"Renegade"	Chapman Baehler
2012	"Outta My Head"	Shane Drake
2012	"Start of Something Good"	Nigel Dick
2013	"Waiting for Superman"	Shane Drake
2014	"Battleships"	Joe Dietsch
2016	"Torches"	Nathan Crooker
2018	"Backbone"	Unknown
2018	"Deep End"	Unknown
2019	"As You Are"	Unknown
2020	"Alive"	Unknown
2020	"World On Fire"	Tyler Dunning Evans
2021	"Heavy Is the Crown"	Tyler Dunning Evans
2021	"Changes are Coming"	from live footage broadcast
2023	"Separate Ways (Worlds Apart)"	Unknown
2023	"Artificial"	Ethan Maniquis
2024	"Pieces"	Unknown
2024	"The Dam"	Jensen Noen
2025	"The Bottom"	Nayip Ramos
2026	"Antidote"	Nayip Ramos
