= Daughtry/Goo Goo Dolls Summer Tour =

2014 concert tour by Daughtry and the Goo Goo Dolls

- Co-headlining tour by Daughtry and Goo Goo Dolls
- Promotional poster for the tour
- Location: North America
- Associated album: Baptized; Magnetic
- Start date: June 12, 2014
- End date: August 30, 2014
- Legs: 1
- No. of shows: 45
Daughtry tour chronology
Baptized World Tour (2014)	Daughtry/Goo Goo Dolls Summer Tour (2014)	Baptized World Tour (2014)
Goo Goo Dolls tour chronology
The Otis Midnight Sessions (2014)	Daughtry/Goo Goo Dolls Summer Tour (2014)	Boxes Summer 2016 Tour (2016)

The Daughtry/Goo Goo Dolls Summer was a co-headlining concert tour by American rock bands Daughtry and the Goo Goo Dolls. The tour was in support of their studio albums Baptized (2013) and Magnetic (2013). The tour began on June 12, 2014, and ended on August 23, 2014, but was expanded to include two more dates and ended on August 30.

== Background ==
The tour was first announced on March 10, 2014.

About the tour Goo Goo Dolls front man, John Rzeznik says, "We are excited to finally be teaming up with Daughtry." "Not only are we huge fans of Chris, but we think this is going to be a huge party for the fans of both of our bands. The combination of the two will make for an awesome summer night of great American rock music."

== Concert synopsis ==
The Goo Goo Dolls' set lasted for eighty-five minutes, Daughtry played for eighty, while opener Plain White T's started the show by playing for thirty. During the Goo Goo Dolls set bass player Robby Takac sang lead for a few songs.

== Opening act ==
- Plain White T's

== Setlists ==
Daughtry
1. Intro/"Baptized"
2. "Feels Like Tonight"
3. "Over You"
4. "Traitor"
5. "Renegade"
6. "It's Not Over"
7. "What About Now"
8. "Outta My Head"
9. "Wild Heart"
10. "Battleships"
11. "Home"
12. "September"

Encore

1. "Waiting for Superman"
2. "Long Live Rock & Roll"
Goo Goo Dolls

Not performed in the same order every night

1. "Lazy Eye"
2. "Dizzy"
3. "Slide"
4. "Big Machine"
5. "Rebel Beat"
6. "When the World Breaks Your Heart"
7. "Already There"
8. "Bringing on the Light"
9. "Come to Me"
10. "Black Balloon"
11. "Stay with You"
12. "Here is Gone"
13. "Caught in the Storm"
14. "Feel the Silence"
15. "Flat Top"
16. "January Friend"
17. "Another Second Time Around"
18. "Not Broken"
19. "Better Days"
20. "Slow It Down"
21. "Iris"
22. "Let Love In"

Encore

1. "Name"
2. "Broadway"

== Tour dates ==
Date	City	Country	Venue
North America
June 12, 2014	Wallingford	United States	Toyota Oakdale Theatre
June 14, 2014	Wantagh	United States	Nikon at Jones Beach Theater
June 15, 2014	Saratoga Springs	United States	Saratoga Performing Arts Center
June 17, 2014	Charleston	United States	Family Circle Tennis Center
June 19, 2014	St. Augustine	United States	St. Augustine Amphitheatre
June 20, 2014	Tampa	United States	MidFlorida Credit Union Amphitheatre
June 21, 2014	Orange Beach	United States	The Amphitheater at the Wharf
June 22, 2014	Corpus Christi	United States	Concrete Street Amphitheatre
June 25, 2014	Dallas	United States	Gexa Energy Pavilion
June 27, 2014	The Woodlands	United States	Cynthia Woods Mitchell Pavilion
June 28, 2014	Hot Springs	United States	Timberwood Amphitheater
June 29, 2014	Maryland Heights	United States	Verizon Wireless Amphitheater
July 1, 2014	Cincinnati	United States	Riverbend Music Center
July 2, 2014	Clarkston	United States	DTE Energy Music Theater
July 3, 2014	Toronto	Canada	Molson Canadian Amphitheatre
July 5, 2014	Bristow	United States	Jiffy Lube Live
July 6, 2014	Virginia Beach	United States	Farm Bureau Live at Virginia Beach
July 8, 2014	Raleigh	United States	Walnut Creek Amphitheatre
July 9, 2014	Charlotte	United States	PNC Music Pavilion
July 11, 2014	Atlanta	United States	Chastain Park Amphitheater
July 12, 2014	Memphis	United States	Memphis Botanic Garden
July 15, 2014	Morrison	United States	Red Rocks Amphitheatre
July 16, 2014	West Valley City	United States	USANA Amphitheatre
July 18, 2014	Eugene	United States	Cuthbert Amphitheater
July 19, 2014	Woodinville	United States	Chateau Ste. Michelle Winery Amphitheatre
July 22, 2014	Los Angeles	United States	Greek Theatre
July 23, 2014	Bakersfield	United States	Rabobank Arena
July 24, 2014	Valley Center	United States	Harrah's Resort Southern California
July 29, 2014	Saratoga	United States	Mountain Winery
August 1, 2014	Las Vegas	United States	Red Rocks Resort, Spa & Casino
August 3, 2014	Phoenix	United States	Comerica Theatre
August 6, 2014	Lincoln	United States	Pershing Auditorium
August 9, 2014	Des Moines	United States	Iowa State Fair
August 10, 2014	Chicago	United States	FirstMerit Bank Pavilion
August 12, 2014	Holmdel	United States	PNC Bank Arts Center
August 15, 2014	Boston	United States	Blue Hills Bank Pavilion
August 16, 2014	Big Flats	United States	The Summer Stage at Tags
August 17, 2014	Camden	United States	Susquehanna Bank Center
August 19, 2014	Bethel	United States	Bethel Woods Center for the Arts
August 21, 2014	Gilford	United States	Bank of New Hampshire Pavilion
August 22, 2014	Darien Center	United States	Darien Lake Performing Arts Center
August 23, 2014	Essex Junction	United States	Champlain Valley Exposition
August 26, 2014	Noblesville	United States	Klipsch Music Center
August 27, 2014	Comstock Park	United States	Fifth Third Ballpark
August 30, 2014	Sioux City	United States	Hard Rock Hotel and Casino

== Box office score data ==
Venue	City	Tickets sold / available	Gross revenue
Family Circle Tennis Center	Charleston	4,012 / 6,462 (62%)	$162,270
Amphitheater at the Wharf	Orange Beach	3,750 / 5,000 (75%)	$149,370
DTE Energy Music Center	Clarkston	10,680 / 14,956 (71%)	$304,612
Greek Theatre	Los Angeles	5,468 / 5,840 (93%)	$331,288
Meadowbrook	Gilford	4,066 / 6,000 (63%)	$197,094
Fifth Third Ballpark	Comstock Park	9,000	—N/a

== Critical reception ==
The Digital Journal's, Markos Papadatos says of the Goo Goo Dolls, "Overall, the Goo Goo Dolls gave Long Island, New York, a night of acoustic, rock and adult contemporary music to remember. It is no wonder that they have been around for well over two decades and they have always managed to stay relevant despite the changes in the music industry."

Sophia June of the Daily Emerald says, "Upon the first glance, the nights lineup seemed a bit random-like creating an unconventional meal out of the last ingredients in your pantry. I wasn't convinced the three bands had much cohesion until the Goo Goo Dolls third song-"Slide". Goo Goo Dolls are a blending of the melodic, harmony-laden romantic Plain White T's and the rock energy and driving electric guitar of Daughtry."

John Serba from M. Live gave the show 2½ stars out of 4, and said that he felt like Daughtry sounded generic and that the Goo Goo Dolls "ring true". About Daughtry he said that they were "skirting the edge of aggro-rock at times – the type of sound that might benefit from a more dynamic light show than what nature provides on a mild summer evening. Although the crowd responded with more enthusiasm to songs such as "Over You", "It's Not Over" and "Battleships", Daughtry's set sometimes lacked punch". For the Goo Goo Dolls, a highlight is when they performed "Rebel Beat". When comparing the two bands, Daughtry is stronger at singing and the Good Goo Dolls are stronger at songwriting.

Sioux City Journal's Bruce R. Miller said, "While the two acts couldn't have been more dissimilar, they helped show just how far that "rock" label can stretch", "Daughtry followed a more familiar path, Goo Goo Dolls went an alternate route." The showmanship between the two was also different. When Goo Goo Dolls bass player Robby Takac took over on lead vocals on a few songs he didn't receive the same reaction as John Rzeznik did.

== Personnel ==
Daughtry

- Chris Daughtry – Lead vocals, rhythm guitar
- Josh Steely – Lead guitar, backing vocals
- Brian Craddock – Rhythm guitar, backing vocals
- Josh Paul – Bass guitar
- Elvio Fernandes – Keyboards, piano, backing vocals
- Jamal Moore – Drums, percussion

Goo Goo Dolls

- John Rzeznik – Lead vocals, guitar
- Robby Takac – Bass guitar, lead vocals, backing vocals
- Brad Fernquist – Guitar, mandolin, saxophone, backing vocals
- Korel Tunador – Keyboards, guitar, saxophone, backing vocals
- Craig McIntyre – Drums, percussion
