= Baptized World Tour =

2014 concert tour by Daughtry

- Tour by Daughtry
- Associated album: Baptized
- Start date: March 4, 2014
- End date: November 22, 2014
- No. of shows: 35 in Europe; 10 in North America; 9 in Australasia; 4 in Asia; 58+ total

Daughtry concert chronology
- Bigger Than Life Tour (2012-13); Baptized World Tour (2014); Daughtry/Goo Goo Dolls Summer Tour (2014)
Daughtry/Goo Goo Dolls Summer Tour (2014)	Baptized World Tour (2014)	2016 Tour (2016)

The Baptized World Tour is the third headlining tour by American rock band, Daughtry in support of their fourth studio album Baptized.

== Opening acts ==
- The Borderline Saints (Sweden only)
- Tahiti 80 (France only)
- The Ex (Netherlands only)
- Amsterdamn! (Germany only)
- Charming Liars (UK only)
- Adam Extra Group (US only)
- Drew Bordeaux (US only)

== Setlist ==
1. "Baptized"
2. "Feels Like Tonight"
3. "Crawling Back to You"
4. "Battleships"
5. "Life After You"
6. "In the Air Tonight" (Phil Collins cover)
7. "Traitor"
8. "Over You"
9. "No Surprise"
10. "Wild Heart"
11. "Broken Arrows" (Koln only)
12. "It's Not Over"
13. "Waiting for Superman"
14. "September"
15. "Home"

Encore

16. "What About Now"
17. "Long Live Rock & Roll"

== Tour dates ==
Date	City	Country	Venue
Europe Leg 1
March 2, 2014	Helsinki	Finland	The Circus
March 4, 2014	Stockholm	Sweden	Tyrol
March 5, 2014	Copenhagen	Denmark	VEGA
March 7, 2014	Paris	France	Trabendo
March 9, 2014	Hamburg	Germany	Gross Freiheit
March 10, 2014	Cologne	Germany	Live Music Hall
March 11, 2014	Amsterdam	Netherlands	Melkweg
March 13, 2014	Milan	Italy	Magazzini Generali
March 14, 2014	Basel	Switzerland	Konzertfabrik
March 16, 2014	Prague	Czech Republic	Roxy
March 18, 2014	Boeblingen	Germany	Sport- Und Kongresshalle
March 19, 2014	Luxembourg	Luxembourg	den Atelier
March 20, 2014	Munich	Germany	Backstage Werk
March 22, 2014	Glasgow	Scotland	O_{2} ABC Glasgow
March 23, 2014	Manchester	England	Manchester Academy
March 24, 2014	Birmingham	England	O_{2} Academy Birmingham
March 26, 2014	London	England	O_{2} Shepherd's Bush Empire
March 28, 2014	Belfast	Northern Ireland	The Limelight
March 30, 2014	Dublin	Ireland	The Academy
March 31, 2014	London	England	O_{2} Shepherd's Bush Empire
North America Leg 1
April 26, 2014	Spartanburg	United States	Converse College
Europe Leg 2
October 6, 2014	Frankfurt	Germany	Batschkapp
October 7, 2014	Hanover	Germany	Capitol
October 9, 2014	Nuremberg	Germany	Lowensaal
October 10, 2014	Gothenburg	Sweden	Tradgarn
October 12, 2014	London	England	Roundhouse (venue)
Asia
October 17, 2014	Singapore	Singapore	Mall Atrium
October 25, 2014	Okinawa	Japan	Marine Corps Base Camp Smedley D. Butler
October 27, 2014	Osaka	Japan	Club Quattro
October 28, 2014	Tokyo	Japan	O-East
North America Leg 2
November 7, 2014	Greensboro	United States	Greensboro Coliseum
November 8, 2014	Cherokee	United States	Harrah's Cherokee
November 12, 2014	Pompano Beach	United States	Pompano Beach Amphitheatre
November 14, 2014	St. Petersburg	United States	Vinoy Park
November 18, 2014	Wabash	United States	Honeywell Center
November 20, 2014	Detroit	United States	MotorCity Casino Hotel
November 21, 2014	New Buffalo	United States	Four Winds New Buffalo
November 22, 2014	Prior Lake	United States	Mystic Lake Casino
December 9, 2014	Pittsburgh	United States	Petersen Events Center
December 14, 2014	Huntington	United States	Paramount Theatre

Cancellations and rescheduled shows

March 29, 2014	Bucharest, Romania	Sala Floreasca	Cancelled

=== Box office score data ===
Venue	City	Tickets sold / available	Gross revenue
Pompano Beach Amphitheatre	Pompano Beach	1,041/ 2,704	$45,597
Sound Board Theater at MotorCity Casino	Detroit	2,308 / 2,365	$109,813
Paramount Theatre	Huntington	1,154 / 1,227	$76,365
