= Break the Spell Tour =

2012 concert tour by Daughtry

- Tour by Daughtry
- Associated album: Break the Spell
- Start date: March 20, 2012
- End date: October 19, 2012
- Legs: 5
- No. of shows: 65 in North America; 16 in Europe; 1 in Asia; 82 in total

Daughtry concert chronology
- Leave This Town Tour (2009–10); Break the Spell Tour (2012); Bigger Than Life Tour (2012–13)

Break the Spell Tour was the second headlining tour from record breaking American rock band Daughtry. The first leg of the tour was announced on January 16, 2012. The tour began on March 20, 2012, in Buffalo, New York and finished on October 19, 2012, in Dubai. It was in support of third studio album Break the Spell and grossed $6.3 million.

== Opening acts ==
- Mike Sanchez
- SafetySuit

== Set list ==
1. "Renegade"
2. "Break the Spell"
3. "Feels Like Tonight"
4. "Crawling Back to You"
5. "Losing My Mind"
6. "Outta My Head"
7. "Crazy"
8. "Start of Something Good"
9. "What About Now"
10. "Home"
11. "Rescue Me"
12. "Spaceship"
13. "Louder Than Ever"
14. "Over You"
15. "No Surprise"
16. "Runnin' Down A Dream" (Tom Petty cover)
17. "September"

Encore

18. "Rebel Yell" (Billy Idol cover)
19. "It's Not Over"

== Tour dates ==
Date	City	Country	Venue
North America Leg 1
March 20, 2012	Buffalo	United States	Shea's Performing Arts Center
March 21, 2012	Reading	United States	Reading Eagle Theater at Sovereign Center
March 24, 2012	Toronto	Canada	Massey Hall
March 25, 2012	Cleveland	United States	Palace Theatre
March 27, 2012	Atlanta	United States	Cobb Energy Performing Arts Centre
March 28, 2012	Little Rock	United States	Robinson Center
March 30, 2012	Nashville	United States	Ryman Auditorium
March 31, 2012	Louisville	United States	Louisville Palace
April 2, 2012	Columbus	United States	Veteran's Memorial
April 3, 2012	Cincinnati	United States	Cincinnati Music Hall
April 4, 2012	Pittsburgh	United States	Benedum Center
April 7, 2012	Greensboro	United States	Greensboro Coliseum
April 9, 2012	Charlotte	United States	Ovens Auditorium
April 11, 2012	Clearwater	United States	Ruth Eckerd Hall
April 14, 2012	Boca Raton	United States	Mizner Park Amphitheater
April 15, 2012	Jacksonville	United States	Moran Theater
April 17, 2012	Columbia	United States	Columbia Township Auditorium
April 18, 2012	Richmond	United States	Landmark Theater
April 20, 2012	West Long Branch	United States	The MAC at Monmouth University
April 21, 2012	Syracuse	United States	Landmark Theatre
April 23, 2012	Lowell	United States	Lowell Memorial Auditorium
April 25, 2012	Newark	United States	New Jersey Performing Arts Center
April 28, 2012	Mashantucket	United States	MGM Grand Theater at Foxwoods
April 29, 2012	Albany	United States	Palace Theatre
May 1, 2012	New York City	United States	Hammerstein Ballroom
North America Leg 2
May 10, 2012	Indianapolis	United States	Egyptian Room
May 11, 2012	Waukegan	United States	Genesee Theatre
May 13, 2012	Minneapolis	United States	The Brick
May 15, 2012	Omaha	United States	Orpheum Theatre
May 16, 2012	St. Louis	United States	Peabody Opera House
May 18, 2012	Kansas City	United States	Midland Theatre
May 19, 2012	Tulsa	United States	Brady Theater
May 21, 2012	Phoenix	United States	Comerica Theatre
May 22, 2012	San Diego	United States	San Diego Civic Theatre
May 24, 2012	Las Vegas	United States	The Joint
May 30, 2012	Los Angeles	United States	Nokia Theatre
May 31, 2012	San Francisco	United States	Warfield Theatre
June 2, 2012	Portland	United States	Keller Auditorium
June 3, 2012	Seattle	United States	Paramount Theatre
June 5, 2012	Salt Lake City	United States	Abravanel Hall
June 7, 2012	Denver	United States	Temple Hoyne Buell Theatre
June 11, 2012	Grand Prairie	United States	Verizon Theatre
June 13, 2012	Austin	United States	Bass Concert Hall
June 20, 2012	Southaven	United States	Snowden Grove Amphitheatre
June 23, 2012	North Platte	United States	Nebraskaland Days Festival
July 7, 2012	Pittsburgh	United States	PNC Park
July 20, 2012	Flushing	United States	Citi Field
July 21, 2012	Montclair	United States	Wellmont Theater
July 23, 2012	Hampton Beach	United States	Hampton Beach Casino Ballroom
July 25, 2012	Troy Fair	United States	Troy Fair
July 26, 2012	Boston	United States	Bank of America Pavilion
July 28, 2012	Portsmouth	United States	nTelos Wireless Pavilion
August 1, 2012	Baltimore	United States	Modell Performing Arts Center
August 3, 2012	Orillia	Canada	Casino Rama
August 4, 2012	Windsor	Canada	Caesars Windsor
August 6, 2012	Milwaukee	United States	BMO Harris Pavilion
August 8, 2012	Charleston	United States	Clay Center for the Arts & Sciences
August 9, 2012	Kettering	United States	Fraze Pavilion
August 11, 2012	Bethlehem	United States	Muskifest
August 12, 2012	Atlantic City	United States	Borgata Resort & Event Center
August 14, 2012	Danbury	United States	Ives Concert Park
August 15, 2012	West Point	United States	Eisenhower Hall Theatre
August 17, 2012	Chesapeake	United States	Chesapeake City Park
August 18, 2012	Royalton	United States	Mix 94.9 Summer Concerts
Europe
September 6, 2012	Brussels	Belgium	Ancienne Belgique
September 7, 2012	Paris	France	Le Zénith
September 9, 2012	Amsterdam	Netherlands	Heineken Music Hall
September 11, 2012	Copenhagen	Denmark	Falcomer Salen
September 12, 2012	Stockholm	Sweden	Ericsson Globe
September 16, 2012	Helsinki	Finland	Hartwall Areena
September 21, 2012	Cologne	Germany	Lanxess Arena
September 22, 2012	Frankfurt	Germany	Festhalle Frankfurt
September 25, 2012	Stuttgart	Germany	Hanns-Martin-Schleyer-Halle
September 26, 2012	Munich	Germany	Olympiastadion
September 28, 2012	Zürich	Switzerland	Hallenstadion
October 1, 2012	London	England	The O_{2} Arena
October 2, 2012	Birmingham	England	National Indoor Arena
October 4, 2012	Manchester	England	Manchester Arena
October 5, 2012	Newcastle upon Tyne	England	Metro Radio Arena
October 7, 2012	Sheffield	England	Motorpoint Arena Sheffield
October 8, 2012	London	England	Wembley Arena
October 12, 2012	Moscow	Russia	Stadium Live
North America Leg 3
October 14, 2012	Red Bank	United States	Count Basie Theatre
Asia
October 19, 2012	Dubai	United Arab Emirates	Al Badia Golf Club

=== Box office score date ===
Venue	City	Attendance	Gross revenue
Shea's Performing Arts Center	Buffalo	2,809 / 2,933 (96%)	$124,705
Reading Eagle Theater at Sovereign Center	Reading	2,759 / 3,552 (78%)	$132,478
Massey Hall	Toronto	2,424 / 2,628 (92%)	$128,393
Palace Theatre	Cleveland	2,606 / 2,606 (100%)	$120,683
Cobb Energy Performing Arts Center	Atlanta	1,724 / 2,546 (70%)	$87,300
Robinson Center	Little Rock	1,418 / 2,393 (59%)	$69,339
Ryman Auditorium	Nashville	2,300 / 2,300 (100%)	$107,010
The Louisville Palace	Louisville	2,602 / 2,602 (100%)	$117,721
Veterans Memorial Auditorium	Columbus	1,928 / 3,234 (60%)	$93,800
Music Hall	Cincinnati	2,029 / 3,138 (65%)	$93,865
Benedum Center	Pittsburgh	2,168 / 2,640 (82%)	$106,820
Greensboro Coliseum	Greensboro	3,945 / 4,995 (80%)	$183,983
Ruth Eckered Hall	Clearwater	2,110 / 2,110 (100%)	$104,135
Mizner Park Amphitheater	Boca Raton	3,194 / 3,240 (99%)	$149,730
Moran Theatre	Jacksonville	1,783 / 2,781 (64%)	$85,092
Memorial Auditorium	Lowell	2,965 / 2,965 (100%)	$125,578
New Jersey Performing Arts Center	Newark	2,316 / 2,747 (84%)	$120,712
Palace Theatre	Albany	2,666 / 2,666 (100%)	$114,423
Hammerstein Ballroom	New York City	3,019 / 3,308 (91%)	$160,166
Egyptian Room	Indianapolis	1,209 / 1,830 (66%)	$59,846
Genesee Theatre	Waukegan	2,347 / 2,347 (100%)	$117,838
The Brick	Minneapolis	1,179 / 1,252 (94%)	$61,898
Orpheum Theatre	Omaha	1,773 / 2,444 (73%)	$84,197
Peabody Opera House	St. Louis	2,222 / 2,923 (76%)	$106,825
Midland Theatre	Kansas City	1,269 / 2,481 (51%)	$55,673
Brady Theatre	Tulsa	1,631 / 2,504 (65%)	$83,582
Comerica Theatre	Phoenix	2,271 / 2,860 (79%)	$111,768
San Diego Civic Theatre	San Diego	1,488 / 2,694 (55%)	$76,230
The Joint	Paradise	1,670 / 3,137 (53%)	$90,813
Nokia Theatre: LA Live	Los Angeles	3,223 / 4,046 (79%)	$168,670
Warfield Theatre	San Francisco	1,513 / 2,360 (64%)	$75,619
Keller Auditorium	Portland	2,614 / 2,881 (91%)	$123,705
Paramount Theatre	Seattle	1,534 / 2,759 (56%)	$78,583
Abravanel Hall	Salt Lake City	2,003 / 2,441 (82%)	$93,312
Temple Horne Buell Theatre	Denver	2,077 / 2,605 (80%)	$104, 773
Verizon Theatre	Grand Prairie	2,091 / 3,168 (66%)	$100,343
Bass Concert Hall	Austin	1,405 / 2,725 (52%)	$70,065
The Colosseum at Caesar's	Windsor	4,109 / 4,934 (83%)	$304,407
TOTAL		84,393 / 96,671 (87%)	$4,088,090

== Personnel ==
Band

- Chris Daughtry – lead vocals, guitar
- Josh Steely – lead guitar, backing vocals
- Brian Craddock – rhythm guitar, backing vocals
- Josh Paul – bass
- Robin Diaz – drums

Touring members

- Elvio Fernandes – keyboards, backing vocals
