= Bigger Than Life Tour =

2012–13 concert tour by Daughtry and 3 Doors Down

- Tour by Daughtry and 3 Doors Down
- Promotional poster for the tour
- Location: North America
- Associated album: Break the Spell; The Greatest Hits
- Start date: November 17, 2012
- End date: August 3, 2013
- Legs: 3
- No. of shows: 62
Daughtry tour chronology
Break the Spell Tour (2012)	Bigger Than Life (2012–13)	Baptized World Tour (2014)
3 Doors Down tour chronology
The Time of My Life Tour (2011)	Bigger Than Life (2012-13)

The Bigger Than Life Tour was a co- headlining tour by American rock bands, Daughtry and 3 Doors Down. The tour supported Daughtry's third studio album, Break the Spell, and 3 Doors Down's The Greatest Hits album.

== Background ==
The tour was announced on October 8, 2012. Chris Daughtry said, "It's an honor to be able to go on the road with 3 Doors Down. We are excited to give fans an energetic rock show every night sharing songs from both our catalogs...we can't wait to hit the road to share it with our fans." The second leg of the tour was announced on December 10, 2012, and the third leg on April 23, 2013.

== Opening acts ==
- P.O.D. (First leg, did not open the shows from November 27-December 3)
- Aranda (Second leg)
- Halestorm (Third leg)
- Bad Seed Rising (Third leg)

== Set list ==
Daughtry

Second leg set list

1. "Break the Spell"
2. "Feels Like Tonight"
3. "Outta My Head"
4. "Crawling Back to You"
5. "What I Want"
6. "Renegade"
7. "Gone too Soon"
8. "Tennessee Line"
9. "Over You"
10. "No Surprise"
11. "In the Air Tonight" (Phil Collins cover) (with Brad Arnold)
12. "Every Time You Turn Around"
13. "Home"

Encore

14. "September"
15. "It's Not Over"
3 Doors Down

Second leg set list

1. "Time of My Life"
2. "It's Not My Time"
3. "Duck and Run"
4. "The Road I'm On"
5. "Away from the Sun"
6. "Let Me Go"
7. "Goodbye"
8. "Loser"
9. "There's a Life"
10. "Landing in London"
11. "One Light"
12. "Here Without You"
13. "Citizen/Soldier"
14. "Symphony of Destruction" (Megadeth cover)
15. "The Better Life"

Encore

16. "Kryptonite"
17. (with Chris Daughtry)
17. "When I'm Gone"

== Tour dates ==
Date	City	Country	Venue
Leg 1
November 17, 2012	Tunica	United States	The Better Life Foundation Event*
November 18, 2012	Springfield	United States	O'Reilly Family Event Center
November 20, 2012	San Antonio	United States	Illusions Theatre
November 21, 2012	Laredo	United States	Laredo Energy Arena
November 23, 2012	Belton	United States	Belton County Expo Center
November 24, 2012	Corpus Christi	United States	Concrete Street Amphitheater
November 27, 2012	Pikeville	United States	Eastern Kentucky Expo Center
November 28, 2012	Huntington	United States	Big Sandy Superstore Arena
November 30, 2012	Asbury Park	United States	Asbury Park Convention Hall
December 1, 2012	Binghamton	United States	Broome County Veterans Memorial Arena
December 3, 2012	Huntington	United States	Paramount Theater
December 4, 2012	University Park	United States	Bryce Jordan Center
December 5, 2012	Detroit	United States	Fox Theatre
December 7, 2012	Champaign	United States	Assembly Hall
December 8, 2012	Saint Paul	United States	The Myth
December 9, 2012	Rosemont	United States	Akoo Theatre
December 11, 2012	Broomfield	United States	1stBank Center
December 13, 2012	Fresno	United States	Save Mart Center
December 15, 2012	Anaheim	United States	Theater at the Honda Center
Leg 2
January 25, 2013	Grand Prairie	United States	Verizon Theatre at Grand Prairie
January 26, 2013	Tulsa	United States	Tulsa Convention Center
January 29, 2013	Tupelo	United States	BancorpSouth Arena
January 29, 2013	St. Louis	United States	Peabody Opera House
February 1, 2013	Battle Creek	United States	Kellogg Arena
February 2, 2013	Louisville	United States	The Louisville Palace
February 5, 2013	Erie	United States	Erie Civic Center
February 6, 2013	Poughkeepsie	United States	Mid-Hudson Civic Center
February 8, 2013	Worcester	United States	DCU Center
February 9, 2013	Rochester	United States	Main Street Armory
February 10, 2013	Bethlehem	United States	Sands Bethlehem Event Center
February 17, 2013	Uncasville	United States	Mohegan Sun Arena
February 19, 2013	Sunrise	United States	BB&T Center
February 22, 2013	Pensacola	United States	Pensacola Civic Center
February 23, 2013	Clearwater	United States	Ruth Eckerd Hall
February 26, 2013	Peoria	United States	Peoria Civic Center
February 27, 2013	Kansas City	United States	Uptown Theater
March 1, 2013	Kearney	United States	Viaero Event Center
March 2, 2013	Rapid City	United States	Rushmore Plaza Civic Center
March 4, 2013	Evansville	United States	The Centre
March 6, 2013	Green Bay	United States	Resch Center
March 9, 2013	Monterrey	Mexico	Arena Monterrey
March 11, 2013	Mexico City	Mexico	Arena Ciudad de México
Leg 3
May 22, 2013^{[A]}	Glen Allen	United States	Snagajob Pavilion at Glen Allen
May 24, 2013	Little Rock	United States	Riverfest
June 15, 2013^{[B]}	La Crosse	United States	University of Wisconsin–La Crosse
June 30, 2013	Tulsa	United States	River Spirit Casino
July 3, 2013	Raleigh	United States	Red Hat Amphitheater
July 5, 2013	Solomons	United States	PNC Waterside Pavilion
July 6, 2013	Baltimore	United States	Pier 6 Concert Pavilion
July 9, 2013	Gilford	United States	Medowbrook U.S. Cellular Pavilion
July 10, 2013	Bangor	United States	Bangor Waterfall
July 12, 2013	Boston	United States	Bank of America Pavilion
July 13, 2013	Big Flats	United States	Tags Summer Stage
July 16, 2013	Hopewell	United States	Marvin Sands Performing Arts Center
July 17, 2013	Wantagh	United States	Nikon at Jones Beach Theater
July 22, 2013	Clarkston	United States	DTE Energy Music Theatre
July 23, 2013	Cincinnati	United States	PNC Pavilion
July 25, 2013	Hammonds	United States	The Venue at Horseshoe Casino
July 26, 2013	Dubuque	United States	Dubuque County Fair
July 27, 2013	West Bend	United States	Washington County Fair
July 29, 2013	Youngstown	United States	Covelli Centre
July 31, 2013	Council Bluffs	United States	Harrah's Council Bluffs
August 1, 2013	Indianapolis	United States	White River State Park
August 3, 2013	Cleveland	United States	Jacobs Pavilion at Nautica

Festivals and other miscellaneous performances
^{A} This concert is a part of Innsbrook After Hours.
^{B} This concert is a part of Freedom Fest at University of Wisconsin – La Crosse

=== Box office score date ===
Venue	City	Tickets sold / available	Gross revenue
DCU Center	Worcester	2,812 / 3,043 (92%)	$114,870
Meadowbrook	Gilford	2,718 / 6,219 (44%)	$142,431
Save Mart Center	Fresno	3,792 / 5,352 (71%)	$148,728
Council Bluffs	Council Bluffs	3,601 / 4,000 (90%)	$144,575
The Venue at Horseshoe Casino	Hammonds	2,080 / 2,516 (83%)	$118,793
Warfield Theatre	San Francisco	1,247 / 2,374 (53%)	$70,064
Verizon Theatre at Grand Prairie	Texas	2,197 / 3,145 (70%)	$111,658
Aranda Peabody Opera House	St. Louis	1,883 / 2,594 (73%)	$98,427
Mohegan Sun Arena	Uncasville	5,288 / 5,362 (99%)	$185,080
Ruth Eckerd Hall	Clearwater	2,059 / 2,059 (100%)	$127,044
Pensacola Bay Center	Pensacola	3,054 / 4,580 (67%)	$114,654
Bryce Jordan Center	University Park	2,431 / 6,315 (38%)	$89,693
TOTAL		33,162 / 47,559 (70%)	$1,466,017
