= Crawling Back to You =

Crawling Back to You may refer to:

- "Crawling Back to You" (Backstreet Boys song), 2005
- "Crawling Back to You" (Daughtry song), 2011
- "Crawling Back to You", a 1994 song by Tom Petty from Wildflowers
- "Do I Wanna Know?" by Arctic Monkeys, 2013, which prominently features this phrase in the chorus
