= Carnal (disambiguation) =

Carnal most commonly relates to the physical and especially sexual appetites or activities. See libido.

Carnal may also refer to:

== People ==
- A surname.
  - Bob G. Carnal, school system superintendent, involved with Ryan White.
  - Henri Carnal, president of the Swiss Mathematical Society.
  - J.Carnal, owner of the Stedcombe (1818 ship).
  - Michel Carnal, winner of the 1964 Grand Prix de Littérature Policière.
- A given name
  - Don Carnal (1330), fictional character in The Book of Good Love.
  - Lord Carnal (1899), fictional character in To Have and to Hold by Mary Johnston, American novelist and women's rights advocate.

== Music ==
- Carnal Records, record label with artists such as Craft.
- Carnal, reggaeton musical artist, on the El Cartel Records label.

=== Albums ===
- Carnal (2019), by Buena Fe, Cuban pop.
- Carnal (2024), by Nothing More, American rock.
- Carnal (2025), by Daughtry, American rock.

=== Songs ===
- "Carnal" (1980), from Pindrop by The Passage, English post-punk.
- "Carnal" (1997), from Black to the Blind by Vader, Polish death metal.
- "Carnal" (2023), from Génesis, by Peso Pluma, Mexican singer and rapper.

== Other uses ==
- Carnal (2015), novel by Kevin Jackson, English writer, broadcaster, filmmaker and pataphysician.
- Carnal (2019), adult film by Wicked Pictures winning the XBIZ All-Sex Release of the Year award.
- Carnal FC, football club in the Kuantan Amateur League, Malaysia.

=== See also ===
- Carnal Comics (1992–2001), American adult comics imprint.
