= Magnetic (Goo Goo Dolls album) =

Studio album by Goo Goo Dolls
- Released: June 10, 2013
- Recorded: August 2012 – February 2013
- Studios: Henson, Hollywood; Quad, New York City
- Genre: Pop rock
- Length: 39:18
- Label: Warner Bros.
- Producers: Rob Cavallo; John Shanks; Gregg Wattenberg; Greg Wells

Goo Goo Dolls chronology
| Something for the Rest of Us (2010) | Magnetic (2013) | Boxes (2016) |

Singles from Magnetic
- 1. "Rebel Beat" Released: February 19, 2013; 2. "Come to Me" Released: July 23, 2013; 3. "Caught in the Storm" Released: August 25, 2014

Magnetic is the tenth studio album by American rock band Goo Goo Dolls, released in the UK on June 10, 2013, and in the US on June 11, through Warner Bros. Records. The album is available on CD, Vinyl and as a digital download.

The recording process took place during the latter half of 2012 and into early 2013. Rzeznik thought of the album title during a phone conversation with his manager, who told Rzeznik to "think of a title for the record. Try to use one word." Magnetic was the first word that came to Rzeznik's mind. This is the last album to feature drummer Mike Malinin who left the band in December 2013.

== History ==
During an interview with UpVenue on February 16, 2011, Rzeznik confirmed that he had been writing new material for a new album during the Something for the Rest of Us Tour. "I've actually been experimenting, in this last week, while we've been out on this tour, just writing lyrics and then figuring out the melodic structures," said Rzeznik, "We can't wait another four years to put another album out; that's just a ridiculous waste of time."

On August 9, 2012, the band announced that it had started recording its tenth studio album. In a column for Japanese Rock magazine InRock, Robby Takac revealed some details about recording sessions for the new album. The new album is scheduled for an early 2013 release on the Warner Brothers record label. The band will use multiple producers like it did on Something for the Rest of Us. In August and September it had various recording sessions with John Shanks at Henson Recording Studios in Hollywood, CA and in October 2012 with Gregg Wattenberg at Quad Studios in New York City. More recording sessions are planned with Greg Wells in Los Angeles in November 2012.

On January 18, 2013, the band released the first single from Magnetic entitled "Rebel Beat". Later on February 15, 2013, the Goo Goo Dolls tweeted an exclusive first look at the Magnetic album cover. On April 3, 2013, the band announced that the release date would be pushed back from May 7 to June 11. More than a month later on July 19, 2013, the Goo Goo Dolls announced its second single from Magnetic will be "Come to Me".

The album was released in high resolution (24bit) on HDtracks.com in 2013. The high res version has a greater dynamic range than the CD release.

In a concert at Red Rocks Amphitheatre July 15, 2014, Rzeznik announced "Caught in the Storm" would be the third single released from Magnetic.

== Tour ==
On January 23, 2014 the band released a statement regarding the tour:

The Goo Goo Dolls will hit the road in April for a spring acoustic tour called The Otis Midnight Sessions. The shows will be performed in a “Story Tellers” format that enables the multi-platinum, Grammy-nominated band to dig deep into an extensive song catalog spanning their nearly 30-year history. It also offers a rare opportunity for fans to see them perform in more intimate settings than the Goos normally visit on their many live treks. The Goos will be joined by Los Angeles favorites Run River North.

An additional date was announced on February 24.

== Reception ==
=== Commercial ===
Magnetic debuted at number 8 on the Billboard 200 chart, selling 29,000 copies in its first week. The album has sold 98,000 copies in the US as of February 2015.

=== Critical ===
Professional ratings
Aggregate scores
| Source | Rating |
|---|---|
| Metacritic | 57/100 |
Review scores
| Source | Rating |
| AllMusic | 3/5 stars |
| Melodic.net | 3.5/5 stars |
| PopMatters | 6/10 |
| Sputnikmusic | 2/5 stars |

Magnetic received mixed reviews from music critics upon its release. At Metacritic, which assigns a normalized rating out of 100 to reviews from mainstream critics, the album has received an average score of 57, based on 7 reviews, indicating "mixed or average" feedback.

- AllMusic's James Christopher Monger gave the album a mixed review, stating: "Rzeznik and Takac are merely sticking with the program that they helped to create, but they have honed their sound so close to the corporate bone that the marrow is beginning to show."
- Melodic.net reviewer Johan Wippsson wrote: "Overall, Magnetic is no masterpiece and could have sounded a bit better. But think it is a step in the right direction and that most fans will appreciate most of the songs."
- Brent Faulkner of PopMatters stated: "All said and done, Magnetic is by no means a truly magnetic album. It is never bad, but rarely (if ever) is it describable as being breathtakingly great. "
- Sputnikmusic staff critic SowingSeason was mixed in the assessment of the album, stating: "Magnetic generally lacks the catchiness and vitality of past efforts, as the band tries in vain to reinvent the wheel but fails to accomplish anything as impressive as "Iris", "Here is Gone", "Black Balloon", "Let Love In"..."

== Track listing ==
| No. | Title | Writer(s) | Length |
|---|---|---|---|
| 1. | "Rebel Beat" | John Rzeznik, Gregg Wattenberg | 3:34 |
| 2. | "When the World Breaks Your Heart" | Rzeznik, Wattenberg, J. T. Harding | 3:33 |
| 3. | "Slow It Down" | Rzeznik, Wattenberg | 3:11 |
| 4. | "Caught in the Storm" | Rzeznik, John Shanks | 3:57 |
| 5. | "Come to Me" | Rzeznik, Wattenberg | 3:45 |
| 6. | "Bringing On the Light" | Robby Takac | 3:16 |
| 7. | "More of You" | Rzeznik, Shanks | 3:26 |
| 8. | "Bulletproofangel" | Rzeznik, Andy Stochansky | 3:23 |
| 9. | "Last Hot Night" | Rzeznik, Todd Clark | 3:37 |
| 10. | "Happiest of Days" | Takac | 3:31 |
| 11. | "Keep the Car Running" | Rzeznik, Shanks | 4:08 |

=== Bonus tracks ===
| No. | Title | Writer(s) | Length |
|---|---|---|---|
| 12. | "Home" (live) | Rzeznik, Stochansky | 4:35 |
| 13. | "Black Balloon" (live) | Rzeznik | 4:25 |

== Personnel ==
Personnel adapted from Magnetic liner notes.

Goo Goo Dolls

- John Rzeznik – vocals (1–5, 7–9, 11); guitars (1–3, 5, 6, 9, 10), electric guitar (7), acoustic guitar (8); background vocals (1, 3, 4, 6, 7, 10, 11); piano (4, 5)
- Robby Takac – bass (all tracks), vocals (6, 10), lap (10)
- Mike Malinin – drums (all tracks), background vocals (11)

Additional musicians

- Gregg Wattenberg – guitars and background vocals (1–3, 5, 6, 9, 10), keyboards (5)
- John Alicastro – background vocals (1)
- Gunnar Olsen – background vocals (1)
- Lenny Skolnik – background vocals (1)
- Derek Fuhrmann – background vocals (1–3, 6, 9, 10); guitars and keyboards (6, 10)
- Ian Driscoll – background vocals (1)
- Paul Buckmaster strings – strings (2)
- John Shanks – acoustic guitars, electric guitars, background vocals, and piano (4, 7, 11), synthesizers (4, 11), percussion (4, 7), hammerchord (4), mandolin and keyboards (7)
- Charlie Judge – keyboards (4)
- Dan Chase – keyboards (4, 11)
- Max ZT – hammered dulcimer (5)
- Todd Clark – background vocals (5)
- Jillette Johnson – background vocals (5)
- Mia Wattenberg – background vocals (5)
- Ben Stanton – background vocals (5)
- Alison Stanton – background vocals (5)
- Brad Fernquist – guitars (6, 9)
- Dylan Shanks – trombone (7)
- Andy Stochansky – background vocals (8)
- Greg Wells – piano and drum programming (8)
- Joel McNeely – string arrangement (8)
- Tim Pierce – guitars (9)
- Jamie Muhoberac – keyboards (9)
- Korel Tunador – keyboards (9)
- Stevie Notes – background vocals (9)
- Roger Treece – background vocals and background vocal arrangements (9)
- Richie English – string arrangement and piano (10)
- Gretchen Fisher – violin (10)
- Claire Fisher – violin (10)
- Kiersten Fisher – viola (10)
- Katie Weissman – cello (10)

Production

- Greg Wattenberg – production (1–3, 5, 6, 9, 10)
- John Shanks – production (4, 7, 11)
- Greg Wells – production (8)
- Rob Cavallo – production (9)
- Chris Shaw – engineering (1–3)
- John Alicastro – engineering (1–3, 5), programming (1, 9)
- Paul Lamalfa – engineering (4, 7, 11) Pro Tools editing and programming (4, 7)
- Lars Fox – engineering (4, 11)
- Dan Chase – engineering (4, 11), programming (9, 11)
- Ross Petersen – engineering (5, 6, 9, 10)
- Ian Driscoll – engineering (5, 6, 10) assistant engineer and additional Pro Tools engineering (9)
- Ian MacGregor – recording (8)
- Doug McKean – engineering (9)
- Mike Brylinski – additional engineering (6, 10) additional Pro Tools engineering (9)
- Justin Rose – additional engineering (6, 10)
- Peter Mack – assistant engineer (4, 7, 11)
- Kevin Matela – assistant engineer (4, 7, 11)
- Lance Summer – assistant engineer (9)
- Lenny Skolnik – assistant engineer (9), programming (1, 9)
- Gunnar Olsen – programming (1)
- Michael Lauri – programming (9)
- Mark Endert – mixing
- Doug Johnson – mix assistant
- Ted Jensen – mastering

== Charts ==
| Chart (2013) | Peak position |
|---|---|
| Australian Albums (ARIA) | 68 |
| Canadian Albums (Billboard) | 21 |
| UK Albums (Official Charts) | 57 |
| US Billboard 200 | 8 |
| US Top Rock Albums (Billboard) | 2 |
