= Bad Seed Rising =

American rock band

- Origin: Frederick, Maryland
- Genre: Hard rock
- Years active: 2012–2017
- Label: Roadrunner
- Past members: Francheska Pastor; Mason Gainer; Aiden Marceron; Louey Peraza
- Website: www.badseedrisingband.com

Bad Seed Rising was an American rock band from Maryland composed of four teenagers: singer/rhythm guitarist Francheska Pastor, lead guitarist Mason Gainer, drummer Aiden Marceron and bassist Louey Peraza. They were the youngest band to sign with Roadrunner Records (a subsidiary of Atlantic Records).

In September 2012 they released their first EP 606 with the help of guitarist Chris Shiflett of the Foo Fighters. In 2013 they were part of the Bigger Than Life Tour. In 2014 they released the EP Charm City (after the nickname of Baltimore).

In 2015 their eponymous song was selected for the closing credits of the movie Spy starring Melissa McCarthy. They also released an EP in May 2015 called A Place Called Home, working with Drew Fulk.

In 2016 the band toured with the Warped Tour of 2016. A debut album called Awake in Color was released in late 2016.

On September 5, 2017, Bad Seed Rising announced its breakup, adding that "there's no bad blood between any of us, we will always still be brothers (and sister)." The band played its final show in Westminster, Maryland, on September 11.

== Discography ==
=== EPs ===
- 606
- Wolves at the Door
- Hey Kid
- Charm City
- A Place Called Home

=== Albums ===
- Awake in Color (2016)
