= Start of Something Good =

Single by Daughtry

from the album Break the Spell
- Released: September 4, 2012
- Recorded: The Cat Room (Los Angeles)
- Genre: Alternative rock; pop rock
- Length: 4:24 (album version); 3:45 (radio version)
- Label: RCA
- Songwriters: Chris Daughtry; Brett James
- Producer: Howard Benson

Daughtry singles chronology
"Outta My Head" (2012)	"Start of Something Good" (2012)	"Waiting for Superman" (2013)

"Start of Something Good" is the fourth official single from American rock band Daughtry's album Break the Spell.

== Background ==
Chris Daughtry announced that it would be the new single on August 24. The song was written by Chris Daughtry and Brett James.

== Music video ==
The music video was directed by Nigel Dick and was filmed on August 31, 2012 in McLeansville, North Carolina at Harold's Farm. Chris Daughtry told Extra, "The concept behind the video is basically I'm observing this young couple who's obviously in love and I'm playing their theme song." "Chris plays the guitar alone in the video, which takes place in a field. Not having the band in it was by design. "It didn't feel like a band video and I didn't want to put them on blankets, you know out in the field on a picnic or something… that would have just been weird." The video premiered on Extra on September 27, 2012.

== Chart positions ==
Chart (2012)	Peak position
US Adult Pop Songs (Billboard)	31
