= Dearly Beloved (Daughtry album) =

Studio album by Daughtry
- Released: September 17, 2021
- Studio: Sienna Recording Studios (Nashville)
- Genre: Post-grunge
- Length: 49:44
- Label: Dogtree; ADA
- Producer: Scott Stevens; Marti Frederiksen

Daughtry chronology
Cage to Rattle (2018)	Dearly Beloved (2021)	Shock to the System (Part One) (2024)

Singles from Dearly Beloved
- 1. "World on Fire" Released: August 13, 2020; 2. "Heavy Is the Crown" Released: March 18, 2021; 3. "Changes Are Coming" Released: September 29, 2021

Professional ratings
Review scores
Source	Rating
Sputnikmusic	5/5 stars
TCNJ Signal	Positive

Dearly Beloved is the sixth studio album by American rock band Daughtry, released on September 17, 2021, through Dogtree Records. It is the follow-up to Cage to Rattle (2018), and their first album not to be released by RCA Records. It is also the last album to feature original bassist, Josh Paul, original guitarist Josh Steely and drummer Brandon Maclin, who left in 2022, 2023, and 2024 respectively.

To promote the album, the Dearly Beloved Tour was originally scheduled to start in November 2021 and feature Sevendust and Tremonti as co-headliners. However, due to the sudden death of Chris Daughtry's step-daughter, the first shows were rescheduled.

== Commercial performance ==
As of February 2024, the album has earned 88,000 album-equivalent units in the US since its release.

== Track listing ==
Dearly Beloved track listing
No.	Title	Writer(s)	Length
1.	"Desperation"	Chris Daughtry	4:48
2.	"World on Fire"	Daughtry; Stevens; Frederiksen	3:38
3.	"Heavy Is the Crown"	Daughtry; John Cummings; Elvio Fernandes; Stevens; Frederiksen	3:58
4.	"Changes Are Coming"	Daughtry; Stevens; Frederiksen	3:42
5.	"Dearly Beloved"	Daughtry; Brian Craddock; Mark Holman	3:43
6.	"Cry for Help"	Daughtry; Stevens; Frederiksen	3:35
7.	"Asylum"	Daughtry; Cummings; Fernandes; Stevens; Frederiksen	3:57
8.	"Evil"	Daughtry; Stevens; Frederiksen	3:33
9.	"The Victim"	Daughtry; Stevens; Frederiksen	3:43
10.	"Somebody"	Daughtry	3:42
11.	"Call You Mine"	Daughtry; Deanna Daughtry	4:18
12.	"Lioness"	Daughtry	3:35
13.	"Break into My Heart"	Daughtry; Stevens; Frederiksen	3:50
Total length:			49:44

Walmart exclusive track
No.	Title	Writer(s)	Length
14.	"Hunger Strike" (featuring Lajon Witherspoon)	Chris Cornell	4:03
Total length:			53:47

== Personnel ==
=== Daughtry ===
- Chris Daughtry – vocals, guitars
- Josh Steely – guitars
- Brian Craddock – guitars
- Josh Paul – bass
- Elvio Fernandes – keyboards
- Brandon Maclin – drums, percussion

=== Additional personnel ===
- Marti Frederiksen – production, digital editing, additional keyboards and guitar, programming
- Brian Craddock – art direction, design
- Scott Stevens – production, mixing, digital editing, additional keyboards and guitar, programming
- Chris Baseford – mixing
- Andrew Cruz – mastering
- Evan Frederiksen – engineering, digital editing
- Mark Holman – additional production
- Elvio Fernandes – additional production
- Sinclair – backing vocals on "Call You Mine"

== Charts ==
Chart performance for Dearly Beloved
Chart (2021)	Peak position
Swiss Albums (Schweizer Hitparade)	49
UK Album Downloads (OCC)	5
UK Albums Sales (OCC	37
UK Independent Albums (Official Charts)	15
US Billboard 200	50
US Independent Albums (Billboard)	8
US Top Hard Rock Albums (Billboard)	4
US Top Rock Albums (Billboard)	10
