= Heavy Is the Crown (Daughtry song) =

2021 single by Daughtry

Single by Daughtry

from the album Dearly Beloved
- Released: March 18, 2021
- Genre: Hard rock industrial metal
- Length: 3:55
- Label: Dogtree
- Songwriters: Chris Daughtry; Johnny Cummings; Elvio Fernandes; Scott Stevens; Marti Frederiksen

Daughtry singles chronology
"World on Fire" (2020)	"Heavy Is the Crown" (2021)	"Changes Are Coming" (2021)

"Heavy Is the Crown" is a song by American rock band Daughtry. It was released on March 18, 2021, as the second single from the band's sixth studio album, Dearly Beloved. It is written by Chris Daughtry, Johnny Cummings, Elvio Fernandes, Scott Stevens and Marti Frederiksen.

== Charts ==
Chart performance for "Heavy Is the Crown"
Chart (2021)	Peak position
US Hot Rock & Alternative Songs (Billboard)	48
US Rock & Alternative Airplay (Billboard)	13
US Mainstream Rock (Billboard)	4

== Release history ==
Release history and formats for "Heavy Is the Crown"
Country	Date	Format	Label	Ref.
Various	March 18, 2021	Digital download; streaming	Dogtree	
