= Rebel Beat =

Single by Goo Goo Dolls

from the album Magnetic
- Released: February 19, 2013
- Studio: Quad (New York)
- Genre: Pop rock
- Length: 3:34
- Label: Warner Bros.
- Songwriters: John Rzeznik; Gregg Wattenberg
- Producer: Gregg Wattenberg

Goo Goo Dolls singles chronology
"All That You Are" (2011)	"Rebel Beat" (2013)	"Come to Me" (2013)

Music video
- "Rebel Beat" on YouTube

"Rebel Beat" is a song recorded by American alternative rock band the Goo Goo Dolls from their tenth studio album titled Magnetic. "Rebel Beat" was premiered on several US radio stations on January 18, 2013. The song was officially released on February 19, 2013.

== Meaning ==
In an interview with Billboard.com, Rzeznik explains Rebel Beat is a collaboration with Gregg Wattenberg, built from a rhythm idea. "I was playing this great old guitar that had kind of a (Led) Zeppelin tone to it," Rzeznik recalls. "I started playing this real sort of basic kind of riff, and we just went from there and then started burbling out lyrics." The final lyrics, Rzeznik says, were inspired by being in New York and walking around the Little Italy and Chinatown districts. "They had this street closed off and a huge party going on," he remembers. "I was thinking, 'I love this! I want to be part of this!' So basically it turned out to be a song about celebrating everything and (saying) no matter what, you've got to have fun. That's really it."

== Music video ==
On the day of the release, the band posted a video on the band's YouTube page. On January 29, Warner Bros Records released an official lyric video. On March 6, the webpage VideoStatic, announced the start of the production of a music video for the song. It also stated that the video will be directed by P.R. Brown.

== Track listing ==
- Digital single
1. "Rebel Beat" - 3:34

== Personnel ==
Personnel adapted from Magnetic liner notes.

Goo Goo Dolls

- John Rzeznik – vocals, guitars, background vocals
- Robby Takac – bass
- Mike Malinin – drums

Additional musicians

- Gregg Wattenberg – guitars, background vocals
- John Alicastro – background vocals
- Gunnar Olsen – background vocals
- Lenny Skolnik – background vocals
- Derek Fuhrmann – background vocals
- Ian Driscoll – background vocals

Production

- Greg Wattenberg – production
- Chris Shaw – engineering
- John Alicastro – engineering, programming
- Gunnar Olsen – programming
- Lenny Skolnik – programming
- Mark Endert – mixing
- Doug Johnson – mix assistant
- Ted Jensen – mastering

== Chart performance ==
=== Weekly charts ===
Chart (2013)	Peak position
Australia	94
Billboard Rock Songs	20
Billboard Rock Digital Songs	31
Billboard Adult Pop Songs	16

=== Year-end charts ===
Chart (2013)	Position
US Hot Rock Songs (Billboard)	63
