= The Bottom (song) =

2025 song by Daughtry

Single by Daughtry

from the EP Shock to the System (Part Two)
- Released: July 25, 2025
- Length: 3:52
- Label: Dogtree; Big Machine Rock
- Songwriters: Chris Daughtry; Brian Craddock; Elvio Fernandes; Scott Stevens; Marti Frederiksen; Johnny Cummings
- Producers: Stevens; Frederiksen

Daughtry singles chronology
"The Dam" (2024)	"The Bottom" (2025)	"Antidote" (2025)

Music video
- "The Bottom" on YouTube

"The Bottom" is a song by American rock band Daughtry. Released on July 25, 2025, as the lead single from Shock to the System (Part Two), it became Daughtry's third number-one song on the Billboard Mainstream Rock Airplay chart.

== Background and release ==
Singer Chris Daughtry said the song reflects a period in which he felt musically uninspired and described it as being about "climbing out of my own hole and reclaiming my own identity again". Daughtry added that he believed "everyone has their own personal bottom". He said the song represents a period in his life during which he felt stuck and experienced artistic self-doubt, saying he second-guessed everything he wrote. He described it as "my way back to myself", saying he was "climbing my way back to a place [where] I felt like I was supposed to be".

"The Bottom" was released alongside the announcement of Shock to the System (Part Two).

== Composition and lyrics ==
Revolver wrote that the song contrasts themes of hopelessness and thoughts of being "lost and forgotten" with "a primal urge to keep fighting". The song is built on a "swaggering groove" that cuts through a haze of distortion, with Daughtry flexing his vocal range with a "hypnotic cadence". It includes the lyric, "I was down in a hole until I clawed my way back from the bottom". Rock Hard wrote that the song's lyrics describe getting back up and fighting one's way back after being down. Sputnikmusic wrote that the song focuses on Daughtry's own life challenges while also referring to things beyond the loss of his mother and daughter. The review linked the lyric about climbing back "from the bottom" to the potential for rebirth hinted at in "The Reckoning" from Shock to the System (Part One).

== Track listing ==
All tracks are written by Chris Daughtry, Scott Stevens and Marti Frederiksen, with additional noted.

"The Bottom" single
No.	Title	Length
1.	"The Bottom" (Brian Craddock, Elvio Fernandes, Johnny Cummings)	3:52
2.	"The Day I Die"	4:00
Total length:		7:52

Notes

- All tracks stylized in all caps.

== Music video ==
The music video opens with Chris Daughtry waking up after being buried underground and fighting through the dirt to climb out of his grave. He then performs in front of a group of dancing zombies before he and his bandmates are consumed by light and explode at the end.

== Chart performance ==
"The Bottom" reached number one on the Billboard Mainstream Rock Airplay chart dated February 28, 2026. The song became Daughtry's third number-one single on the chart.

== Personnel ==
Credits adapted from Apple Music.

Daughtry

- Chris Daughtry – lead vocals, songwriter
- Brian Craddock – guitar, songwriter
- Elvio Fernandes – background vocals, keyboards, songwriter
- Marty O'Brien – bass

Additional musician

- Scott Stevens – programming, songwriter, producer, recording engineer, editing engineer

Additional credits

- Marti Frederiksen – songwriter, producer, recording engineer, editing engineer
- Johnny Cummings – songwriter
- Evan Frederiksen – recording engineer, editing engineer
- Chris Baseford – mixing engineer
- Irene Genova – assistant mixing engineer
- Ted Jensen – mastering engineer

== Charts ==
Weekly chart performance for "The Bottom"
Chart (2025–2026)	Peak position
Canada Mainstream Rock (Billboard Canada)	27
US Rock & Alternative Airplay (Billboard)	11
US Mainstream Rock Airplay (Billboard)	1
