= Come to Me (Goo Goo Dolls song) =

Single by Goo Goo Dolls

from the album Magnetic
- Released: July 23, 2013
- Recorded: 2012
- Studio: Quad (New York)
- Length: 3:45
- Label: Warner Bros.
- Songwriters: John Rzeznik, Gregg Wattenberg
- Producer: Gregg Wattenberg

Goo Goo Dolls singles chronology
"Rebel Beat" (2013)	"Come to Me" (2013)	"Caught in the Storm" (2014)

"Come to Me" is a song recorded by American alternative rock band the Goo Goo Dolls from their tenth studio album Magnetic. "Come to Me" premiered on US radio stations starting July 23, 2013 and was officially released the same day.

== Track listing ==
- Digital download
1. "Come to Me" – 3:45

== Personnel ==
Personnel adapted from Magnetic liner notes.

Goo Goo Dolls

- John Rzeznik – vocals, guitars, piano
- Robby Takac – bass
- Mike Malinin – drums

Additional musicians

- Gregg Wattenberg – guitars, background vocals, keyboards
- Max ZT – hammered dulcimer
- Todd Clark – background vocals
- Jillette Johnson – background vocals
- Mia Wattenberg – background vocals
- Ben Stanton – background vocals
- Alison Stanton – background vocals

Production

- Greg Wattenberg – production
- John Alicastro – engineering
- Ross Petersen – engineering
- Ian Driscoll – engineering
- Mark Endert – mixing
- Doug Johnson – mix assistant
- Ted Jensen – mastering

== Charts ==
=== Weekly charts ===
Weekly chart performance for "Come to Me"
Chart (2013–2014)	Peak position
US Bubbling Under Hot 100 (Billboard)	15
US Adult Contemporary (Billboard)	24
US Adult Pop Airplay (Billboard)	16
US Hot Rock & Alternative Songs (Billboard)	17

=== Year-end charts ===
Year-end chart performance for "Come to Me"
Chart (2014)	Position
US Hot Rock & Alternative Songs (Billboard)	45

== Certifications ==
Certifications for "Come to Me"
Region	Certification	Certified units/sales
United States (RIAA)	Gold	500,000^{‡}
^{‡} Sales+streaming figures based on certification alone.
