= Vinoy Hotel =

- The Vinoy Hotel
- U.S. National Register of Historic Places
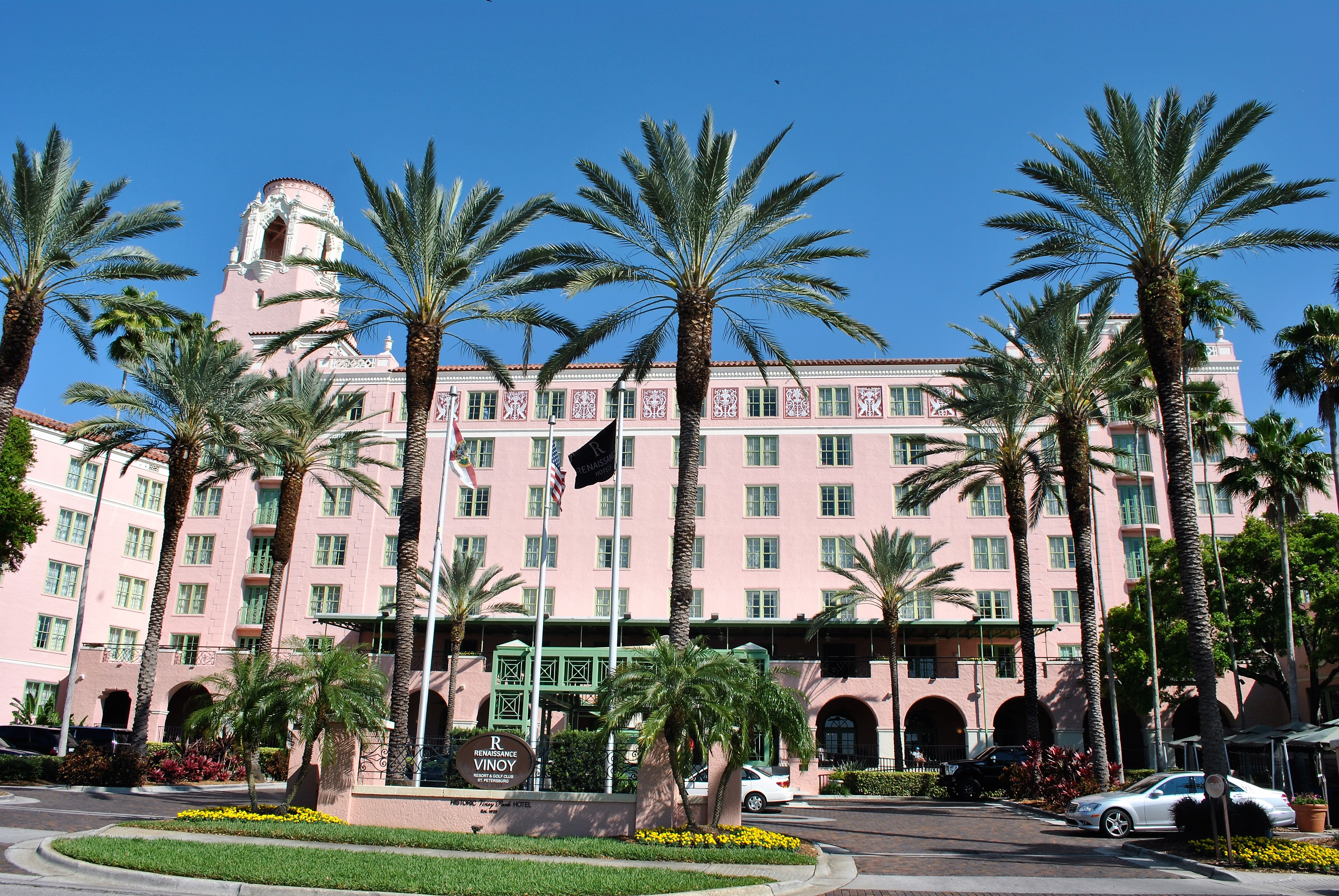
- (2017)

- Location within Florida Location within the United States
- Location: St. Petersburg, Florida
- Coordinates: 27°46′41.24″N 82°37′48.34″W
- Built: 1925
- Architect: Henry L. Taylor
- Architectural style: Mediterranean Revival
- NRHP reference No.: 78000955
- Added to NRHP: September 11, 1978

The Vinoy Resort & Golf Club, Autograph Collection is an historic Mediterranean Revival-style hotel opened in 1925 as the Vinoy Park Hotel. It is located in St. Petersburg, Florida at 501 Fifth Avenue Northeast, on the bayfront area of downtown, overlooking the Vinoy Yacht Basin. The hotel is a member of Historic Hotels of America, the official program of the National Trust for Historic Preservation.

== History ==
The Vinoy Park Hotel was built in 1925 by oil tycoon Aymer Vinoy Laughner. Construction began on February 5 and took 10 months to complete, with a grand opening on December 31. It was a seasonal hotel, open from around December to March. Rates were $20.00 a night, the highest in the area at that time. Celebrities ranging from Babe Ruth, Herbert Hoover, Calvin Coolidge and James Stewart are known to have stayed there.

With the onset of World War II, the hotel closed on July 3, 1942 and was taken over by the U.S. Army for use as a training school. The hotel reopened in December 1944. It was then sold in 1945 to Charles Alberding for $700,000. It continued to prosper for the next couple of decades but fell out of favor and into decline and disrepair by the end of the 1960s. In 1974, the Vinoy Park closed and most of its contents were sold at auction. On September 11, 1978, it was added to the U.S. National Register of Historic Places.

The hotel sat vacant until 1990, when it was bought by the Vinoy Development Corporation, which renovated it at a cost of $93 million. The hotel reopened in 1992 as the Stouffer Vinoy Resort. Stouffer Hotels was bought by Renaissance Hotels the following year, and the hotel became the Renaissance Stouffer Vinoy Resort, and then in 1996 the Renaissance Vinoy Resort.

In 2005, the Vinoy earned AAA Four-Diamond status.

On April 18, 2012, the AIA's Florida Chapter placed it on its list of Florida Architecture: 100 Years. 100 Places.

In August 2018, the Vinoy Renaissance St. Petersburg Resort & Golf Club was sold by RLJ Lodging Trust to SCG Hospitality, owned by Tampa Bay Buccaneers’ owner Bryan Glazer. The sale included a golf club and 74-slip marina as well as the 362-room hotel. The amount of the sale was reported to be $188.5 million. The hotel left the Renaissance brand of Marriott and joined the Autograph Collection brand as The Vinoy Resort & Golf Club, Autograph Collection in April 2023, at the conclusion of major renovations.

== Paranormal activity ==
Over the years, there have been reports of ghost sightings and other supernatural events at the hotel. Some of the reports were by visiting major league baseball players and staff, who stayed at the Vinoy when in town to play the Tampa Bay Rays.

One of the reports came from a strength coordinator for the Pittsburgh Pirates. He described seeing a translucent apparition of a man near a desk in his room. Others have noted seeing a man dressed in formal attire walking the halls only to disappear without a trace.

== See also ==
- List of Historic Hotels of America
