= The Borderline Saints =

Rock band from Skåne, Sweden

- Origin: Skåne, Sweden
- Genres: Rock
- Years active: 2009-present
- Members: Andreas Centervall - Guitar; Dennis Petersson - Vocals; Emanuel Svensson - Bass; Jimmy Fehrm - Vocals; Mattias Breivald - Guitar; Alexander Platon - Keyboard; Jonas Andersson - Drums

The Borderline Saints is a rock band from Skåne, Sweden.

== Biography ==
The Borderline Saints is a rock band which was formed on January 1, 2009. The band released their debut album "F60-F69" in the spring of 2011. Their music is described as alternative power pop.

The band made it to the regional final of the Emergenza music festival contest. In the regional final of the competition, the band finished 4th. In 2010 the band teamed up with bands Artmade, Classified Drama and Zoma Cruz and went on toured the southern Sweden. The tour was called A.C.T.Z. Rock Tour. The band was signed by an independent record label, Ktown records. During the tour, the band played the Slagthuset in Malmö.

=== Style ===
The band are known for their "do it yourself"-attitude, having built their own in-house studio where they record, mix and master their music on their own. (Sonart studio) Guitarist AC started a label to release the music, Rockstar re:chords.

== Discography ==
For credits & lyrics goto theborderlinesaints.com/discography

Albums

- Anger Management (2013)
- F60-F69 (2011)

EPs

- Straitjackets & the usual medication (2012)
- Tear Down These Walls... (2010)

The EP "Tear down these walls" was a preview of the debut album "F60-F69", the latter being a 12-song strong album with a variety of styles. The songs and genres crossing from rock influenced by punk and heavy metal to softer pop and ballads.
"Straitjackets & the usual medication" saw the introduction of Platon on keyboards/piano which opened new doors for the band and widened their sound. The EP reaped some fine reviews (see reviews listed below) leaving audience and journalists craving for more.
Both "F60-F69" and "Straitjackets & the usual medication" was released on Spotify and iTunes.

== Collaborations ==
In 2012 The Borderline Saints teamed up with Danish electronic music producer Dishy and released dance versions of both "Cut by an angel" and "Cruel world" on Spotify and iTunes.
After the release of "Straitjackets & the usual medication" sign language artists Vega & Sofie made a trademark sign language music video for "Cheers".
