= World on Fire (Daughtry song) =

Single by Daughtry

from the album Dearly Beloved
- Released: August 13, 2020
- Genre: Rock
- Length: 3:39
- Label: Dogtree
- Songwriters: Chris Daughtry; Marti Frederiksen; Scott Stevens
- Producers: Marti Frederiksen; Scott Stevens

Daughtry singles chronology
"Alive" (2019)	"World on Fire" (2020)	"Heavy Is the Crown" (2021)

"World on Fire" is a song by American rock band Daughtry. Written by lead singer Chris Daughtry along with Scott Stevens and Marti Frederiksen, it is the first single from their sixth studio album Dearly Beloved (2021). It was released on August 13, 2020, by Dogtree Records as the album's lead single.

== Composition ==
"World on Fire" is a song written by Chris Daughtry, Scott Stevens, Marti Frederiksen with production by the later two. The song is about how the world was, literally and figuratively, "on fire" due to the COVID-19 pandemic, the George Floyd protests and the bushfires during the 2019–20 Australian bushfire season during the year 2020.

== Charts ==
Chart performance for "World on Fire"
Chart (2021)	Peak position
Czech Republic Rock (IFPI)	5
UK Singles Downloads (OCC)	90
US Rock & Alternative Airplay (Billboard)	47

== Release history ==
Release history and formats for "World on Fire"
Country	Date	Format	Label	Ref.
Various	August 13, 2020	Digital download; streaming	RCA	
