= Battleships (song) =

Single by Daughtry

from the album Baptized
- Released: May 12, 2014
- Recorded: 2013
- Studio: The Cat Room (Los Angeles)
- Genre: Pop rock
- Length: 3:52
- Label: RCA
- Songwriters: Chris Daughtry; Martin Johnson; Sam Hollander
- Producer: Martin Johnson

Daughtry singles chronology
| "Waiting for Superman" (2013) | "Battleships" (2014) | "Torches" (2016) |

"Battleships" is a song recorded by American rock band Daughtry for their fourth studio album, Baptized (2013). The song was written by Daughtry frontman Chris Daughtry, Sam Hollander, and Martin Johnson, while production was handled by Johnson. It was serviced to hot adult contemporary radio in the US through RCA Records on May 12, 2014, as the third overall single from the album and the second to be promoted in North America. The song debuted at number 38 on the Billboard Adult Pop Songs chart.

== Content ==
The song is a pop rock power ballad that describes a tempestuous, conflict-riddled relationship wherein the narrator and his significant other "love like battleships". As one of the most strongly pop-influenced songs on the album, Chris Daughtry explained to The Hollywood Reporter that he was nervous fans would not take to "Battleships" due to it being "too weird", "too out-there" and/or "too pop", but that he fell in love with the new sound while recording it. The "boom boo-boom boom boo-boom boom boom" hook in the chorus drew attention and some criticism from music critics, who described it as "stunningly weird", "silly", and "crazy".

== Music video ==
A lyric video for the song premiered on April 9, 2014. On June 16, Chris Daughtry tweeted a photo with the caption "Things are gettin CRAZY on the #battleships video shoot!!!!", suggesting that an official music video was being filmed at that time. The official music video for "Battleships" premiered on August 12, 2014 and features behind-the-scenes footage from the band's summer tour with the Goo Goo Dolls.

== Chart performance ==
"Battleships" debuted at number 38 on the Billboard Adult Pop Songs chart for the week ending June 21, 2014.

| Chart (2014) | Peak position |
|---|---|
| Canada AC (Billboard) | 37 |
| US Adult Pop Airplay (Billboard) | 20 |

== Release history ==
| Country | Date | Format | Label(s) |
|---|---|---|---|
| United States | May 12, 2014 | Hot AC | RCA |
