= Korel Tunador =

Korel Tunador is an American multi-instrumentalist, singer, and songwriter living in Los Angeles, California. He plays a number of instruments, including guitar, keyboards, saxophone and accordion. Tunador is originally from Pittsburgh, Pennsylvania. He graduated with a degree from Berklee College of Music in Boston, Massachusetts. In Boston, he also started playing guitar, singing, songwriting and touring with the well established Boston band, Shockra. After several years, he moved back to Pittsburgh and played in a number of bands including: Crisis Car, The Crawlin' Low Band, The Johnsons, Lovechild, Margalit and the Liquitones and Opek 15. In 2001, Korel also won an endowment from the Pittsburgh Cultural Trust, a Creative Achievement Award grant, as an Emerging Artist.

In 2003, Tunador moved to Los Angeles to continue his music career. He began working as a touring musician, and his first tour out of Los Angeles was playing keyboards with Mississippi songwriter Charlie Mars. They toured all of 2004 supporting Charlie's album, Gather The Horses, on V2 Records. The next year he played guitar with actress Jada Pinkett Smith's metal band, Wicked Wisdom. They recorded an album and toured on Ozzfest in 2005.

In 2006, Tunador began playing keyboards/guitar/saxophone/vocals with The Goo Goo Dolls for the tour supporting their album, Let Love In. He toured internationally with the Goo Goo Dolls for three years, performing on dozens of television shows, such as Late Night with Conan O'Brien, Today, Live From Abbey Road and The Tonight Show with Jay Leno (several times with the Goo Goo Dolls and another with Papa Roach). He also played on their song Before It's too Late for the soundtrack of the Transformers movie and is in the live DVD releases from Red Rocks and Capitol Records Studios.

In late 2008, Tunador joined up with Katy Perry's band to be part of the live house band as she hosted the European Music Awards in Liverpool, England. He joined the Katy Perry tour full-time in 2009, singing vocals and playing guitar, keyboards and saxophone. They played on the 2009 Grammy Awards and a host of television shows, such as Today, The Ellen DeGeneres Show, and a string of international shows. Tunador was a key part of the re-interpreting of Katy Perry's songs for a taping of MTV Unplugged, which has also been released as an album and DVD. He also co-produced, arranged, and recorded a medley of the Song of the Year nominees in a Cabaret style that Perry performed when she hosted the MTV Europe Music Awards again in 2009.

In September 2009, Tunador returned to The Goo Goo Dolls and contributed vocal harmonies and keyboards on their new record, Something for the Rest of Us, which was released in August 2010. He then participated in an extensive tour promoting the new record.

In January 2010, he had several of his songs featured in the independent film by Rand Marsh, Scorpio Men On Prozac, which was released in the New York Film Festival.

In September 2010, Tunador released his first solo record, No Tomorrows. In May 2019, he joined Rob Thomas on his Chip Tooth Smile tour.
