= Life After You (Daughtry song) =

2009 single by Daughtry

Single by Daughtry

from the album Leave This Town
- B-side: "Life After You" (acoustic)
- Released: November 10, 2009
- Recorded: September 2008 – March 2009 (Los Angeles, California)
- Genre: Pop rock
- Length: 3:27
- Label: RCA
- Songwriters: Chris Daughtry; Chad Kroeger; Joey Moi; Brett James
- Producer: Howard Benson

Daughtry singles chronology
"No Surprise" (2009)	"Life After You" (2009)	"September" (2010)

"Life After You" is a song by American rock band Daughtry, released as the second single from their second album, Leave This Town (2009). Chris Daughtry wrote the song with Nickelback vocalist Chad Kroeger and producer Joey Moi. Two versions of the original version exist: an album version and a music video version with the crowd cheering at the end. "Life After You" received positive reviews from music critics.

== Background ==
Chad Kroeger offered "Life After You" to Chris Daughtry while he was still on tour with Bon Jovi. Daughtry was not sure if the song suited the band, but a year later, unable to get the song out of his head, he wrote the bridge for the song. It was included on his album Leave This Town and was released as the second single from the album.

== Promotion ==
The band performed the song live at the American Music Awards on November 22, 2009. The song was also performed by the band at halftime during the Oakland Raiders vs. Dallas Cowboys Thanksgiving football game.

== Chart performance ==
"Life After You" debuted at number 66 on the Billboard Hot 100 the chart week of December 19, 2009, and moved up to number 36. It reached number five on Adult Pop Songs (formerly known as the Adult Top 40), making it the band's seventh consecutive top-10 hit there. It spent a total of 62 weeks at number one on the Rock Digital Songs chart, making it the longest song at number one, beating their own record of 23 weeks set with "It's Not Over". The single had sold 890,000 digital downloads as of January 2011. It also ranked number 96 in the 2010 year-end chart. On the Billboard Hot 100, Daughtry obtained their seventh top-40 single with this song.

On the issue dated February 27, 2010, "Life After You" became the group's seventh top-40 hit on the Canadian Hot 100, peaking at number 39, later rising to 34.

== Music video ==
Daughtry released the music video for "Life After You" on October 15, 2009.

=== Summary ===
The video begins with Chris in a hotel room trying to call his wife who does not pick up. He then leaves the hotel and gets on a bus and soon winds up in a bar. He then gets up and goes into the back to a warehouse where the rest of the band is waiting for him and they start performing. He then sees his wife and he celebrates with the other members. He is then seen talking with her on the phone and after he hangs up, he and the band go onto the stage where the audience is waiting. His wife's face is never shown.

== Track listing ==
1. "Life After You" – 3:26
2. "Life After You" (acoustic) – 3:32

== Charts ==
=== Weekly charts ===
Chart (2009–2010)	Peak position
Canada Hot 100 (Billboard)	34
Canada AC (Billboard)	16
Canada CHR/Top 40 (Billboard)	36
Canada Hot AC (Billboard)	1
US Billboard Hot 100	36
US Adult Contemporary (Billboard)	4
US Adult Pop Airplay (Billboard)	4
US Pop Airplay (Billboard)	19

=== Year-end charts ===
Chart (2010)	Position
Canadian Hot 100 (Billboard)	99
US Billboard Hot 100	96
US Adult Contemporary (Billboard)	10
US Adult Pop Songs (Billboard)	5

== Release history ==
Release dates and formats for "Life After You"
Region	Date	Format	Label(s)	Ref.
United States	November 3, 2009	Mainstream airplay	RCA	
