= Break the Spell =

Studio album by Daughtry
- Released: November 21, 2011
- Recorded: July–September 2011
- Studios: Bay 7 Studios (Valley Village, California); Sparky Dark Studio (Calabasas, California); Sunset Sound (Hollywood, California); The Gray Curtain Studio
- Genre: Post-grunge
- Length: 43:45
- Labels: RCA; 19
- Producer: Howard Benson

Daughtry chronology
Leave This Town: The B-Sides (2010)	Break the Spell (2011)	Baptized (2013)

Singles from Break the Spell
- 1. "Renegade" Released: September 27, 2011; 2. "Crawling Back to You" Released: October 4, 2011; 3. "Outta My Head" Released: March 13, 2012; 4. "Start of Something Good" Released: September 4, 2012

Professional ratings
Aggregate scores
Source	Rating
Metacritic	(61/100)
Review scores
Source	Rating
Allmusic	3.5/5 stars
Entertainment Weekly	B
Billboard	71%
Slant	1.5/5 stars
Sputnikmusic	3/5 stars
Newsday	B−
Loudwire	4/5 stars
Celebrity Cafe	5/5 stars
The Boston Globe	(Mixed)
Artistdirect	4/5 stars

Break the Spell is the third studio album by American rock band Daughtry, released on November 21, 2011, by RCA Records. It is a follow-up to their platinum selling album Leave This Town in 2009. On December 15, the album was officially certified Gold.

== Background ==
According to Chris Daughtry, the album is "more upbeat and positive lyrically" and also stated that the album sounds "nothing like the previous two". Chris Daughtry wrote all of the songs with band guitarists Josh Steely and Brian Craddock, bassist Josh Paul, and in collaboration with Marti Frederiksen, Busbee and Brett James. The album was produced by Howard Benson, who also produced their previous two albums.

Prior to the album's release, during the month of November, the tracks "Renegade", "Louder Than Ever" and "Outta My Head" were used by ESPN during some of their programming broadcasts.

Daughtry's official website made a listening party for Break the Spell.

== Sales ==
Break the Spell opened at number 67 on the UK charts. On the Billboard 200, Break the Spell opened at #8 with sales of 129,000

"Start of Something Good" sold 10,000 singles.

== Singles ==
"Renegade" was released as the album's lead single and first rock single. It was released to rock stations on September 27, 2011, and made available for download on October 18, 2011.

"Crawling Back to You" was released at the first pop single from the album, second overall on October 4, 2011. It reached to number 6 on the US Adult Top 40 chart.

"Outta My Head" and "Start of Something Good" were released as the third and fourth singles off the album, respectively.

== Track listing ==
The track listing was announced on October 6 through Daughtry's official site.

No.	Title	Writer(s)	Length
1.	"Renegade"	Daughtry; Josh Paul	3:35
2.	"Crawling Back to You"	Daughtry; Marti Frederiksen	3:45
3.	"Outta My Head"	Daughtry; Frederiksen	3:31
4.	"Start of Something Good"	Daughtry; Brett James	4:24
5.	"Crazy"	Daughtry; Elvio Fernandes; Greg Wiktorski	3:24
6.	"Break the Spell"	Daughtry; Dave Bassett	3:32
7.	"We're Not Gonna Fall"	Daughtry; busbee; Zac Maloy	3:19
8.	"Gone Too Soon"	Daughtry; busbee	3:36
9.	"Losing My Mind"	Daughtry; busbee	3:48
10.	"Rescue Me"	Daughtry; Josh Steely	3:22
11.	"Louder Than Ever"	Daughtry; James	3:37
12.	"Spaceship"	Daughtry; Brian Craddock	3:51
Total length:			43:45

Deluxe edition bonus tracks
No.	Title	Writer(s)	Length
13.	"Who's They"	Daughtry	3:11
14.	"Maybe We're Already Gone"	Daughtry; Steely; Craddock; Paul	4:21
15.	"Everything But Me"	Daughtry; Steely; Craddock; Paul	4:28
16.	"Lullaby"	Daughtry	2:25
Total length:			55:29

Japan and Expanded edition bonus tracks
No.	Title	Writer(s)	Length
13.	"Who's They"	Daughtry	3:11
14.	"Maybe We're Already Gone"	Daughtry; Steely; Craddock; Paul	4:21
15.	"Everything But Me"	Daughtry; Steely; Craddock; Paul	4:28
16.	"Lullaby"	Daughtry	2:25
17.	"Never Die"	Daughtry	3:26
Total length:			58:55

Tour edition bonus DVD
No.	Title	Length
1.	"Crawling Back to You" (music video)	3:37
2.	"Outta My Head" (music video)	3:24
3.	"Feels Like Tonight" (Live)	4:47
4.	"Outta My Head" (Live)	4:01
5.	"What About Now" (Live)	5:05
6.	"Home" (Live Acoustic)	6:37
7.	"Start Of Something Good" (Live)	5:17

== Personnel ==
Credits adapted from album's liner notes.

Band members

- Chris Daughtry – vocals
- Brian Craddock – guitars
- Josh Steely – guitars
- Josh Paul – bass
- Robin Diaz – drums

Additional musicians

- Howard Benson – keyboards, programming
- Lenny Skolnik – programming, strings (3)

=== Production ===
- Rain Hancock – A&R
- Howard Benson – producer
- Mike Plotnikoff – recording
- Paul DeCarli – additional engineer, digital editing
- Hatsukazu Inagaki – additional engineer
- Jimmy Fahey – assistant engineer (2, 7–9)
- David Schwerkolt – assistant engineer (2, 7–9)
- Morgan Stratton – assistant engineer (2, 7–9)
- Chris Lord-Alge – mixing at Mix LA (Los Angeles, California)
- Keith Armstrong – assistant mix engineer
- Nik Karpen – assistant mix engineer
- Andrew Schubert – additional mix engineer
- Brad Townsend – additional mix engineering
- Ted Jensen – mastering at Sterling Sound (New York City, New York)
- Marc Vangool – guitar technician
- Jon Nicholson – drum technician
- Erwin Gorostiza – creative director
- Chris Feldmann – art direction, design
- Chapman Baehler – photography
- Dee Anderson – stylist
- Christian Marc – make-up
- Stirling McIlwaine for Pearl Group Entertainment – management

== Charts and certifications ==
=== Weekly charts ===
Chart (2011)	Peak position
Australian Albums (ARIA)	32
Austrian Albums (Ö3 Austria)	39
Canadian Albums (Billboard)	13
German Albums (Offizielle Top 100)	27
Japanese Albums (Oricon)	53
New Zealand Albums (RMNZ)	18
Scottish Albums (Official Charts)	57
Swiss Albums (Schweizer Hitparade)	19
Swedish Albums (Sverigetopplistan)	57
UK Albums (Official Charts)	67
UK Album Downloads (Official Charts)	27
UK Rock & Metal Albums (Official Charts)	2
US Billboard 200	8
US Top Rock Albums (Billboard)	2

=== Year-end charts ===
Chart (2012)	Position
US Billboard 200	53
US Rock Albums (Billboard)	11

=== Certifications ===
Region	Certification	Certified units/sales
Canada (Music Canada)	Gold	40,000^{^}
United States (RIAA)	Gold	513,000
^{^} Shipments figures based on certification alone.
