= Crawling Back to You (Daughtry song) =

2011 single by Daughtry

Single by Daughtry

from the album Break the Spell
- Released: October 3, 2011
- Studio: The Cat Room (Los Angeles)
- Length: 3:45 (album version); 3:38 (radio edit)
- Label: RCA
- Songwriters: Chris Daughtry; Marti Frederiksen
- Producer: Howard Benson

Daughtry singles chronology
"Renegade" (2011)	"Crawling Back to You" (2011)	"Outta My Head" (2012)

"Crawling Back to You" is a song from American rock band Daughtry's third studio album, Break the Spell (2011). It was released on October 3, 2011, as the lead pop single and second overall single off the album. Chris Daughtry co-wrote the song with Marti Frederiksen, while Howard Benson served as the record's producer.

The song was a modest chart success, reaching number 41 on the Billboard Hot 100 and number six on the Adult Pop Songs chart. It was also the band's second entry on the Japan Hot 100, reaching 24. In Canada, the song charted at 36, surpassing the chart peak of lead single, "Renegade". Ultimately, it was the only single off Break the Spell to enter the Hot 100.

== Background and release ==
"Crawling Back to You" was originally recorded for Daughtry's second album, Leave This Town, in 2009, but was left off the final track listing. While working on Break the Spell in 2011, Chris Daughtry returned to the song and worked with co-writer Marti Frederiksen to tweak the chorus; this revised version was then re-recorded and included on the album.

The song and "Renegade" were made available for a free listen on the band's official website on September 19, 2011. It was officially released to digital retailers through RCA Records on October 3. It impacted American mainstream radio on October 25, 2011.

== Music video ==
The music video premiered on October 26, 2011, and was directed by Laurent Briet. It focuses on the band as they perform the song in an abandoned parking lot. The band relied upon "weird" camera angles and post-production effects to add interest.

== Commercial performance ==
Professional ratings
Review scores
Source	Rating
Popcrush	2/5 stars
The Celebrity Cafe	5/5 stars
Romeoscorner	(B)

"Crawling Back to You" debuted at number 41 on the US Billboard Hot 100 chart dated October 22, 2011, with sales of 47,000. It was the highest-ranking debut of the week as well as Daughtry's third-highest debut, behind "No Surprise" (15) and "What About Now" (18). It spent ten weeks on the chart, with 41 remaining its peak. The song fared better at radio, reaching number six on the Adult Pop Songs chart (their last top 10 on that chart) and number 14 on the Adult Contemporary chart, both in 2012.

The song debuted at number 36 on the Canadian Hot 100 chart dated October 22, 2011. In Japan, the song was their second charting single, entering the Japan Hot 100 at number 24 on the chart dated February 4, 2012.

== Chart positions ==
=== Weekly charts ===
Chart (2011–12)	Peak position
Canada Hot 100 (Billboard)	36
Canada AC (Billboard)	16
Canada Hot AC (Billboard)	18
Japan Hot 100 (Billboard)	24
US Billboard Hot 100	41
US Adult Pop Airplay (Billboard)	6
US Adult Contemporary (Billboard)	14

=== Year end charts ===
Chart (2012)	Position
US Adult Contemporary (Billboard)	29
US Adult Pop Songs (Billboard)	33

== Release history ==
Country	Date	Format	Label	Ref.
Various	October 3, 2011	Digital download	RCA	
United States	October 25, 2011	Contemporary hit radio	RCA	
