= Waiting for Superman (song) =

Single by Daughtry

from the album Baptized
- Released: September 17, 2013
- Recorded: 2013
- Studio: The Cat Room (Los Angeles)
- Genre: Electropop
- Length: 4:26 (album version); 4:14 (radio edit)
- Label: RCA
- Songwriters: Chris Daughtry; Martin Johnson; Sam Hollander
- Producer: Martin Johnson

Daughtry singles chronology
"Start of Something Good" (2012)	"Waiting for Superman" (2013)	"Battleships" (2014)

"Waiting for Superman" is a song co-written by Chris Daughtry for his band Daughtry's fourth studio album, Baptized. It was released as the lead single from the album on September 17, 2013. An electropop ballad, the song was co-written by Sam Hollander and Boys Like Girls lead singer Martin Johnson. The latter also served as the record producer.

The song's title and lyrics are references to the comic book superhero Superman and contains other allusions and metaphors to the comic—including Lois Lane and Metropolis.

== Promotion and release ==
During early September, Daughtry announced on Twitter that fans would be able to help unlock the single artwork via the band's official website; this took them to Hyperactive, a social media promotion which would let them add their Facebook or Twitter profile photo to the artwork itself and contribute in building the image of the single.

Daughtry announced the release date would be September 17, 2013, though whether the track was to be available to download on that day or was to have its first play on the radio was left unclear. On September 16, Daughtry's official Twitter account sent out a tweet with confirmation that the single would be available at 12:01 am on September 17. (EST). The following week, the single was serviced to hot adult contemporary stations and contemporary hit radio.

== Music video ==
The video began filming on October 3 and finished the same day. The music video features Chris Daughtry, Thomas Dekker and Patrick Muldoon and was directed by Shane Drake. It was released on October 24. 2013.

It features Dekker as a scruffy-looking man in a big city who seems to be able to sense when trouble is about to occur. It shows him saving several people, including a woman about to be run over by a cyclist, a woman who gets her purse stolen and a suicidal man about to jump from a ledge. Each time, his actions are misinterpreted and the victims are shown to be ungrateful. The woman about to be run over is mad that he shoved her, the police think he's in league with the purse snatcher and nearly arrest him and the suicidal man is upset to be pulled away from the ledge. The helpful man seems to be saddened and frustrated, but keeps on trying to help all the same. The song cuts to shots of a girl being teased by a pack of other teens in an alleyway and of Daughtry singing in the midst of his actions. Eventually, he stumbles across the teenage girl being harassed and threatened. He chases the bullies off, but a nearby passerby (bassist Josh Paul) calls the police, thinking the man is attacking the teens. After comforting the girl, he returns her home to her grateful mother. As the police arrive and try to arrest him, the mother and daughter explain that he saved her. Letting him go, they still warn him off. As he turns to leave, clearly saddened, the girl runs up to him and gives him a grateful hug. Happy again and with a smile on his face, the man walks off.

== Reception ==
=== Critical ===
Critical reception to the song was positive upon its release.

On September 18, Artistdirect.com published a review in which they praised Chris' voice and songwriting skills. They gave the song 4.5 out of 5 stars, concluding: "There's no need to wait for Superman any longer. He's here to save music again with one of the year's catchiest singles".

=== Commercial ===
The single opened at number 80 in the UK, the band's first charting single in the UK top 100 since "What About Now" back in 2009, and is also Daughtry's second highest-charting single in that country.

In the US, "Waiting for Superman" debuted at number 70 on Hot 100 and sold 53,000 downloads. It also debuted at number 25 and number 26 on Billboard's Hot Digital Tracks and Hot Digital Songs charts, respectively, as well as number 93 on the Canadian Hot 100. The single was certified Platinum in 2013.

== Credits and personnel ==
- Songwriting – Chris Daughtry, Martin Johnson, Sam Hollander
- Production – Daughtry, Martin Johnson, additional by Kyle Moorman and Brandon Paddock
- Mixing – Serban Ghenea
- Engineering – Kyle Moorman, Brandon Paddock

== Charts ==
=== Weekly charts ===
Weekly chart performance
Chart (2013–14)	Peak position
Canada Hot 100 (Billboard)	51
Canada AC (Billboard)	32
Canada Hot AC (Billboard)	47
Finland Airplay (Radiosoittolista)	63
Scottish Singles Sales (Official Charts)	55
UK Singles (Official Charts)	80
US Billboard Hot 100	66
US Adult Contemporary (Billboard)	15
US Adult Pop Airplay (Billboard)	11
US Pop Airplay (Billboard)	40

=== Year-end charts ===
Annual chart rankings
Chart (2014)	Position
US Adult Contemporary (Billboard)	45
US Adult Pop Songs (Billboard)	41

== Certifications and sales ==
Certifications and sales
Region	Certification	Certified units/sales
United States (RIAA)	Platinum	1,000,000^{‡}
^{‡} Sales+streaming figures based on certification alone.

== Release history ==
Region	Date	Format	Label
United States	September 17, 2013	CD; digital download	RCA
United States	September 26, 2013	Hot adult contemporary airplay	RCA
United States	January 6, 2014	Contemporary hit radio	RCA
