= Renegade (Daughtry song) =

Single by Daughtry

from the album Break the Spell
- Released: September 27, 2011
- Studio: The Cat Room (Los Angeles)
- Genre: Rock
- Length: 3:35
- Label: RCA
- Songwriters: Chris Daughtry; Josh Paul
- Producer: Howard Benson

Daughtry singles chronology
"September" (2010)	"Renegade" (2011)	"Crawling Back to You" (2011)

"Renegade" is a song by American rock band Daughtry from their third studio album Break the Spell (2011). It was released September 27, 2011 as the lead album's lead rock single. The song was played on ESPN in November along with two other songs from the album. WWE used "Renegade" to highlight the nominees for "Trending Star of the Year" during the 2011 Slammy Awards on an episode of WWE Raw.

Professional ratings
Review scores
Source	Rating
Loudwire	3.5/5 stars

== Release ==
"Renegade", along with "Crawling Back to You" were made available for a free listen on the band's official website on September 19, 2011. It was later released to rock stations September 27, 2011. On October 18, 2011 the songs was made available for purchases via iTunes. A music video was also released featuring the band's live clips from different shows.

== Charts ==
Chart performance for "Renegade"
Chart (2011)	Peak position
Canada Hot 100 (Billboard)	90
US Heritage Rock (Billboard)	22
US Rock Digital Songs (Billboard)	14
