= Baptized (album) =

Studio album by Daughtry
- Released: November 19, 2013
- Recorded: March–September 2013
- Studio: The Cat Room (Los Angeles)
- Genre: Pop rock
- Length: 44:54
- Labels: RCA; 19
- Producers: Chris Daughtry; Martin Johnson; busbee; DreZa; Rock Mafia; Mason "MdL" Levy; Johnny BLK; Claude Kelly; Elvio Fernandes; Jake Sinclair; Scott Stevens; Toby Gad; Onree Gill

Daughtry chronology
Break the Spell (2011)	Baptized (2013)	It's Not Over...The Hits So Far (2016)

Singles from Baptized
- 1. "Waiting for Superman" Released: September 17, 2013; 2. "Battleships" Released: May 12, 2014

Baptized is the fourth studio album by American rock band Daughtry, released on November 19, 2013, by RCA Records. It was preceded in September by electropop-influenced lead single "Waiting for Superman". It is the final album to feature drummer Robin Diaz and first album to include keyboardist/guitarist Elvio Fernandes. The album departs significantly from the group's hard rock sound present on their first three albums, instead introducing a more pop rock musical style with strong synth-pop influences.

== Background ==
The band worked with many other songwriters and musicians on the album. Some that they worked with include Martin Johnson of Boys Like Girls, Sam Hollander, Blair Daly, Espionage, Rock Mafia, Ali Tamposi, The Monsters and the Strangerz, Scott Stevens, Kara DioGuardi, Jake Sinclair, Claude Kelly, Johnny Black, and Matthew Thiessen. Daughtry stated that he worked without his bandmates and instead went with the new producers. Daughtry has stated that the album features a new, poppier sound and would also include folk influences.

== Singles ==
The first single from the album is "Waiting for Superman", written by Chris Daughtry, Sam Hollander, and Martin Johnson. The song was released on iTunes on September 17, 2013.

"Battleships" impacted hot adult contemporary radio on May 12, 2014 as the second official single off the album.

=== Other songs ===
"Long Live Rock & Roll" was released digitally on October 22, 2013 as the first and only promotional single off the album. It was also released as the lead single in the UK market on February 24, 2014

A new "stripped" version of "Witness" was released to digital retailers on February 20, 2015.

== Reception ==
Professional ratings
Aggregate scores
Source	Rating
Metacritic	53/100
Review scores
Source	Rating
AllMusic	3.5/5 stars
Newsday	B−
Rolling Stone	2.5/5 stars
Ultimate Guitar	3/5 stars
Slant Magazine	1/5 stars

=== Critical ===
The album has been met with mixed reviews from most critics. Chuck Eddy of Rolling Stone gave the album a 2.5 out 5, saying "Seven years after he placed on American Idol, Chris Daughtry and his band are opening up their would-be grunge to more nuance: folk instruments and synths, smoother high notes tempering Daughtry's bellow, "boom-b'boom" vocal-bass hook lightening the gender war in "Battleships". The sound on Baptized somehow links U2 to Rascal Flatts, adding Springsteen stances in "Wild Heart". More unexpectedly, there's also a banjo shuffle where Daughtry chooses Van Halen over Van Hagar, catalogs some of his other heroes and wonders who wrote Hole's songs. "Long Live Rock & Roll", it's called – a defense, perhaps, against anybody claiming guys like him helped kill it".

Glenn Gamboa of Newsday gave the album a grading of B−, saying "Daughtry takes some cool chances on his fourth album". He then commented positively on "Waiting for Superman", calling it "a sleek change of pace, rolling together bits of The Fray and Bon Jovi into the patented Daughtry sound"; and gave "Long Live Rock & Roll" a positive review, saying "he cleverly reminisces about Billy Joel and grunge in a country-style rave-up". However, he commented negatively on "Battleships" "with the stunningly weird chorus of "We love like battleships ... And the cannon goes, 'Boom boo-boom boom boo-boom boom boom'", which is, well, crazy, and you wonder if he's gone too far". He then concluded by saying "Daughtry broadens his sound with mixed results".

Ken Capobianco of The Boston Globe also gave the album a mixed review, saying "Daughtry strips his sound to more acoustic textures and even ventures into electro-pop. At times, the change is refreshing, yet too often he seems to think the world needs more songs evoking Train or Lifehouse. Only the powder keg rocker "Traitor" diverges from the new approach. Luckily, Daughtry has one of the more expressive voices in rock, so he still breathes some life into the overload of corny lyrics".

Jon Caramanica of The New York Times delivered a more negative review for the album, saying that he felt Daughtry felt limited with the stripped-down music. "But even though Daughtry's music has softened, there's not much Mr. Daughtry can do with his voice, which has an appealing, powerful growl with no sultriness to it. It wants badly to roar but is given almost no opportunity".

=== Commercial ===
The album debuted at No. 6 on the Billboard 200, No. 1 on Top Internet Albums, and No. 3 on Top Rock Albums, selling 55,000 copies in its first week. It has sold 270,000 copies in the United States as of January 2016. In the United Kingdom, the album debuted at No. 42, selling 4,978 copies in its first week.

== Track listing ==
No.	Title	Writer(s)	Producer(s)	Length
1.	"Baptized"	Chris Daughtry; Martin Johnson; John Lardieri; Claude Kelly	Johnson; Kyle Moorman (add.); Brandon Paddock (add.); Johnny BLK (add.)	3:11
2.	"Waiting for Superman"	Daughtry; Johnson; Sam Hollander	Johnson; Moorman (add.); Paddock (add.)	4:26
3.	"Battleships"	Daughtry; Johnson; Hollander	Johnson; Moorman (add.); Paddock (add.)	3:52
4.	"I'll Fight"	Daughtry; busbee	busbee; DreZa	3:00
5.	"Wild Heart"	Daughtry; Johnson; Hollander	Johnson; Moorman (add.); Paddock (add.)	3:50
6.	"Long Live Rock & Roll"	Daughtry; Johnson; Hollander	Johnson; Moorman (add.); Paddock (add.)	3:36
7.	"The World We Knew"	Daughtry; Antonina Armato; Tim James	Rock Mafia; Aaron Dudley (add.)	3:35
8.	"High Above the Ground"	Daughtry; busbee	busbee; Mason "MdL" Levy	3:11
9.	"Broken Arrows"	Daughtry; Lardieri; Kelly	Johnny BLK; Kelly	4:08
10.	"Witness"	Daughtry; Elvio Fernandes; Kelly; Lardieri	Fernandes; David Schuler (add.)	4:11
11.	"Traitor"	Daughtry; Kara DioGuardi; Jake Sinclair	Sinclair	3:03
12.	"18 Years"	Daughtry; Johnson; Hollander	Johnson; Moorman (add.); Paddock (add.)	4:51
Total length:				44:54

Deluxe edition bonus tracks
No.	Title	Writer(s)	Producer(s)	Length
13.	"Undefeated"	Daughtry; Scott "The Ninja" Stevens	Stevens	3:40
14.	"Cinderella"	Daughtry; Toby Gad	Gad	3:13
15.	"Battleships" (acoustic)	Daughtry; Hollander; Johnson	Onree Gill	3:41
Total length:				53:29

Japan bonus tracks
No.	Title	Writer(s)	Producer(s)	Length
13.	"Undefeated"	Daughtry; Stevens	Stevens	3:40
14.	"Cinderella"	Daughtry; Gad	Gad	3:13
15.	"Battleships" (acoustic)	Daughtry; Hollander; Johnson	Gill	3:41
16.	"Long Live Rock & Roll" (acoustic)	Daughtry; Johnson; Hollander		3:37
Total length:				57:06

== Personnel ==
Daughtry

- Chris Daughtry – vocals, guitars (15), tambourine (15)
- Elvio Fernandes – keyboards (15), backing vocals (15)
- Brian Craddock – guitars (15)
- Josh Steely – guitars (15), mandolin (15)
- Josh Paul – bass (15)
- Robin Diaz – drums (15)

Performance credits

Vocalists

- Chris Daughtry – lead vocals (1–3, 5–7, 9, 11–13), vocals (4, 8, 10, 14)
- Martin Johnson – backing vocals (1–3, 5, 6, 12)
- Rock Mafia – additional backing vocals (7)
- Johnny Blk – backing vocals (9)
- Jake Sinclair – backing vocals (11)
- Scott Stevens – backing vocals (13)

Gang vocals

- Sam Hollander (1–3, 6)
- Martin Johnson (1–3, 6, 12)
- Brian Paddock (1–3, 6, 12)
- John Schmidt (1, 12)
- Chris Bernard (2, 3, 6, 12)
- Devin Kam (2, 3, 6)
- Kyle Moorman (2, 3, 6, 12)
- Steve Shebby (6)
- Daughtry (15)
- Ornee Gill (15)

Instruments

- Martin Johnson – acoustic piano (1–3, 5, 6, 12), programming (1–3, 5, 6, 12), acoustic guitar (1–3, 5, 6, 12), electric guitar (1–3, 5, 6, 12), percussion (1–3, 5, 6, 12), additional instrumentation (1, 2, 5, 12), "cigar box" guitar (3, 6), mandolin (3, 5, 6), ukulele (5)
- Kyle Moorman – programming (1–3, 5, 6, 12)
- Brian Paddock – programming (1–3, 5, 6, 12), bass (1, 2, 5, 6, 12), electric guitar (6)
- Steve Shebby – additional programming (6)
- Chuck Harmony – acoustic piano (9)
- Johnny Blk – all instruments (9)
- Elvio Fernandes – music performer (10)
- Jake Sinclair – keyboards (11), programming (11), guitars (11), bass (11), drums (11)
- Mark Holeman – synthesizer programming (13), drum programming (13)
- Scott Stevens – synthesizer programming (13), guitars (13), drum programming (13)
- John Alicastro – additional programming (13)
- Michael Lauri – additional programming (13)
- Toby Gad – all instruments (14), programming (14)
- Tim Pierce – guitars (7), bass (7)
- Daniel Damico – additional acoustic guitar (13)
- Tim James – mandolin (7)
- John Keefe – drums (1, 12)
- Victor Indrizzo – drums (7), percussion (7)
- Larry Gold – string arrangements and conductor (9)
- Glenn Fischbach and Jennie Lardieri – cello (9)
- Davis Barnett and Jonathan Kim – viola (9)
- Dayna Anderson, Eliza Cho, Emma Kummrow, Olga Konopelsky, Luigi Mazzocchi and Charles Parker – violin (9)

=== Production ===
- Rani Hancock – A&R
- Martin Johnson – producer (1–3, 5, 6, 12)
- Johnny Blk – additional production (1), producer (9)
- Kyle Moorman – additional production (1–3, 5, 6, 12)
- Brian Paddock – additional production (1–3, 5, 6, 12)
- busbee – producer (4, 8)
- Stephen "DreZa" Dresser – producer (4)
- Rock Mafia – producers (7)
- Aaron Dudley – additional production (7)
- MdL (Mason David Levy) – producer (8)
- Claude Kelly – producer (9)
- Elivo Fernandes – producer (10)
- Dave Schuler – additional production (10)
- Jake Sinclair – producer (11)
- Scott Stevens – producer (13)
- Toby Gad – producer (14)
- Onree Gill – producer (15)
- Christopher Hunte – production coordination (9)
- Kayla Lee – production coordination (9)
- Erwin Gorostiza – creative director
- Chris Feldmann – art direction
- Michelle Holme – art direction
- Alice Butts – design
- José Enrique Montes Hernandez – photography (flowers)
- Jasper James – city landscape photography
- Michael Muller – band photography
- Stirling McIIwaine for Pearl Entertainment Group – management

Technical credits

- Chris Gehringer – mastering at Sterling Sound (New York City, New York)
- Serban Ghenea – mixing (1–12, 15)
- John Hanes – mix engineer (1–12, 15)
- Martin Johnson – engineer (1–3, 5, 6, 12)
- Kyle Moorman – engineer (1–3, 5, 6, 12)
- Brian Paddock – engineer (1–3, 5, 6, 12)
- busbee – recording (4, 8)
- Steve Shebby – engineer (6)
- Adam Comstock – recording (7)
- Steve Hammons – recording (7)
- Mike Piazza – engineer (9)
- Jeff Chestak – string engineer (9)
- Elivo Fernandes – recording (10)
- Scott Stevens – engineer (13)
- Tony Maserati – mixing (13, 14)
- Chris Daughtry – mixing (15)
- Karl Peterson – assistant string engineer (9)
- John Krausse – assistant mix engineer (13)
- Chris Tabron – assistant mix engineer (13, 14)
- Justin Hergett – assistant mix engineer (14)
- Chris Bernard – digital editing (1–3, 6), drum technician (12)

== Charts and sales ==
=== Weekly charts ===
Chart (2013)	Peak position
Australian Albums (ARIA)	56
Austrian Albums (Ö3 Austria)	39
Canadian Albums (Billboard)	16
German Albums (Offizielle Top 100)	43
Irish Albums (IRMA)	100
Japanese Albums (Oricon)	102
Norwegian Albums (VG-lista)	38
Scottish Albums (Official Charts)	28
Swiss Albums (Schweizer Hitparade)	24
UK Albums (Official Charts)	42
US Billboard 200	6
US Top Rock Albums (Billboard)	3

=== Year-end charts ===
Chart (2014)	Position
US Billboard 200	86
US Top Rock Albums (Billboard)	16

=== Sales ===
Region	Sales
United Kingdom	4,978
United States	270,000

== Release history ==
Region	Date	Label	Format	Edition(s)	Catalog
Germany	November 15, 2013	Sony	CD; digital download	Deluxe	88883-79665-2
United States	November 19, 2013	RCA; 19	CD; digital download	Standard	88883-79665-2
South Korea	November 19, 2013	Sony	CD; digital download	Deluxe	S20126C
Japan	December 25, 2013	Sony	CD; digital download	Deluxe	SICP-3941
United Kingdom	February 17, 2014	Sony	CD; digital download	Deluxe re-release	88883-79665-2-RE1
