= Leave This Town =

Studio album by Daughtry
- Released: July 14, 2009
- Recorded: 2008–2009; Los Angeles
- Studios: Sparky Dark Studio (Calabasas, California); Bay 7 Studios (Valley Village, California)
- Genre: Post-grunge
- Length: 46:48
- Labels: RCA; 19
- Producer: Howard Benson

Daughtry chronology
Daughtry (2006)	Leave This Town (2009)	Leave This Town: The B-Sides (2010/2011)

Singles from Leave This Town
- 1. "No Surprise" Released: May 5, 2009; 2. "Life After You" Released: November 10, 2009; 3. "September" Released: June 1, 2010

Leave This Town is the second album by the American rock band Daughtry, released on July 14, 2009, by RCA Records. It is the first album that they recorded as a band, as their self-titled debut album was recorded before the band was formed and only lead singer Chris Daughtry was signed to the label. It was also their last album to feature Joey Barnes on drums. The album's style is primarily arena rock, with influences ranging from hard rock to pop rock.

Three singles were released from the album, led by "No Surprise", which became the group's fourth chart topper on the Billboard Adult Top 40 chart in August 2009. All three peaked within the top 40 on the Billboard Hot 100 and within the top five on both the Adult Top 40 and Adult Contemporary charts.

The album was released to generally mixed reviews, with critics noting the lack of progression from their previous album. It fared better commercially, debuting atop the Billboard 200 and selling over 1.3 million copies in the US alone. Leave This Town has been certified Platinum by both the RIAA and Music Canada.

== Background ==
Chris Daughtry announced on his Twitter that there would be 14 songs on the record, but 5 bonus tracks in different stores. Nearly 70 songs were written for Leave This Town, before the selection was narrowed down to 19. Daughtry co-wrote the songs on the album with Richard Marx, Chad Kroeger from Nickelback, Ryan Tedder from OneRepublic, Jason Wade from Lifehouse, Adam Gontier from Three Days Grace, Eric Dill from The Click Five, and Mitch Allan from SR-71 and Tommy Henriksen. On May 29, 2009, Daughtry released the album art cover. The songs written with Marx, Tedder, Gontier and Wade did not make the standard edition of the album, but were released as bonus tracks in various markets.

Three songs from the CD ("No Surprise," "Every Time You Turn Around," and "You Don't Belong") were used to promote racing on ESPN. "You Don't Belong" resultantly entered the Billboard Hot 100 at number 95.

The title of the album comes from lyrics from the track "September".

== Reception ==
Professional ratings
Review scores
Source	Rating
Allmusic	3/5 stars
Entertainment Weekly	B
IGN	(8/10)
Los Angeles Times	2.5/4 stars
The New York Times	(Positive)
People	3/4 stars
Rolling Stone	3/5 stars
Slant	1/5 stars
Sputnikmusic	2/5 stars
USA Today	2.5/4 stars

=== Critical reception ===
Critical response to Leave This Town was mixed. At Metacritic, which assigns a normalized rating out of 100 to reviews from mainstream critics, the album has received an average score of 59, based on 10 reviews. The BBC Music review called it an 'album of box-ticking, airwave-saitiating harmlessness.' Users on Album of the Year gave it 66 out of 100, with users praising the albums 'Straightforward, chorus heavy rock.' When reviewing Leave This Town, Matthew Cole of Slant Magazine said, 'Chris Daughtry has a real band that plays really serious songs, which are, almost without exception, really, really bad.'

=== Commercial performance ===
It sold 269,000 copies in its first week in the U.S., peaking at number one. It peaked at number two in Canada, six places ahead of its predecessor. The album has sold 1,329,000 copies as of May 2, 2012.

== In media ==
"Ghost of Me" was featured on a CSI: Miami commercial.

"No Surprise" was performed live by the band on the top 4 results show of the eighth season of American Idol on May 5, 2009.

"Tennessee Line" was performed live with Vince Gill during the 2009 CMA awards on November 11, 2009. It was also used as a music backdrop to the trailer for the TV series "Young Justice".

"Learn My Lesson" has been featured in a commercial of Fullmetal Alchemist: Brotherhood in Animax-Asia.

"Every Time You Turn Around" was featured in the video game MLB 2K10

"Supernatural" is featured in the preview of the 2010 MLB Division Series, both NL & AL on TBS.

== Singles ==
- "No Surprise" served as the lead single for the album. It was streamed on their official website, on the evening of May 6, 2009. The song was made available on iTunes May 5, 2009. It debuted at number fifteen on the Billboard Hot 100 the chart week of May 23, 2009. It is the band's highest debut to date on the chart, fueled by strong first week digital sales of 103,000. It has sold 1,201,000 copies in the United States by January 19, 2011.
- The second single, "Life After You", was released around October 2009. It has sold 890,000 digital downloads in the United States.
- The third single is "September". It was performed on the American Idol Season 9 Top 4 Results Show. It has sold 419,000 digital downloads in the United States.

== Track listing ==
No.	Title	Writer(s)	Length
1.	"You Don't Belong"	Chris Daughtry	4:00
2.	"No Surprise"	Daughtry; Chad Kroeger; Eric Dill; Rune Westburg; Joey Moi	4:29
3.	"Every Time You Turn Around"	Daughtry; Andy Waldeck	3:39
4.	"Life After You"	Daughtry; Kroeger; Moi; Brett James	3:26
5.	"What I Meant to Say"	Daughtry; Brian Howes	3:09
6.	"Open Up Your Eyes"	Daughtry; Ben Moody; David Hodges	4:19
7.	"September"	Daughtry; Josh Steely	4:00
8.	"Ghost of Me"	Daughtry; Howes	3:38
9.	"Learn My Lesson"	Daughtry; Mitch Allan; Chris Tompkins	3:50
10.	"Supernatural"	Daughtry; Josh Paul; Hodges	3:38
11.	"Tennessee Line" (featuring Vince Gill)	Daughtry; Brian Craddock	4:37
12.	"Call Your Name"	Daughtry; Joey Barnes	4:03
Total length:			46:48

Official website
No.	Title	Writer(s)	Length
13.	"Long Way"	Daughtry; Jason Wade	4:03
14.	"One Last Chance"	Daughtry; Allan; Hodges	3:27

iTunes Bonus Track version
No.	Title	Writer(s)	Length
13.	"What Have We Become"	Daughtry; Craddock; Steely Paul; Barnes, Tommy Henriksen	3:43
14.	"On the Inside"	Daughtry; Kroeger; Richard Marx	3:24
15.	"Traffic Light" (pre-order only)	Daughtry; Craddock	3:40

UK iTunes Bonus Track Version
No.	Title	Writer(s)	Length
13.	"Get Me Through"	Daughtry; Craddock	3:44
14.	"Traffic Light"		3:40
15.	"Back Again" ("No Surprise" single bonus track)	Daughtry; Adam Gontier	3:38

Japanese Edition Bonus track
No.	Title	Length
13.	"Get Me Through"	3:44

Target exclusive Deluxe Edition Bonus DVD
No.	Title	Length
1.	"It's Not Over" (video)	3:52
2.	"Home" (video)	4:16
3.	"Over You" (video)	3:44
4.	"Feels Like Tonight" (video)	4:02
5.	"What About Now" (video)	4:11
6.	"No Surprise" (video)	4:10

Unused tracks

1. "From Where You're Standing" (performed live)
2. "Standing Still" (performed live)
3. "When You Come Around" (performed live)
4. "You're In My Hands" (performed live)
5. "Back to Me" (performed live)
6. "Today" (performed live)

== Personnel ==
Credits adapted from the album's liner notes.

Daughtry

- Chris Daughtry – vocals, guitars
- Josh Steely – guitars
- Brian Craddock – guitars
- Josh Paul – bass
- Joey Barnes – drums
- Robin Diaz – drums (7–12)

Additional musicians

- Howard Benson – keyboards and programming
- Jamie Muhoberac – additional keyboards
- Phil X – additional guitars
- Michito Sanchez – percussion
- Aubrey Haynie – additional fiddle
- Debbie Lurie – string arrangements
- Mark Robertson – string contractor
- Vince Gill – guest vocals on "Tennessee Line"

=== Production ===
- Pete Ganbarg – A&R
- Ashley Newton – A&R
- Howard Benson – producer
- Mike Plotnikoff – recording
- Hastukazu Inagaki – additional engineer
- Chris Concepcion – technical assistance
- Ashburn Miller – string engineer at Entourage Studios (North Hollywood, California)
- Justin Niebank – vocal engineer for Vince Gill and fiddle engineer at Blackbird Studio (Nashville, Tennessee)
- Chris Lord-Alge – mixing at Mix LA (Los Angeles, California)
- Keith Armstrong – mix assistant
- Nik Karpen – mix assistant
- Andrew Schubert – additional mix engineer
- Brad Townsend – additional mix engineer
- Paul DiCarli – digital editing
- Ted Jensen – mastering at Sterling Sound (New York City, New York)
- Marc Vangool – guitar technician
- Joe Nicholson – drum technician
- Frank Harkins – art direction
- Max Vadukul – photography
- Jim Lee – illustrations
- Simon Fuller and Stirling McIlwaine for 19 Entertainment – management

== Charts ==
=== Weekly charts ===
Chart (2009)	Peak position
Australian Albums (ARIA)	21
Austrian Albums (Ö3 Austria)	18
Canadian Albums (Billboard)	2
German Albums (Offizielle Top 100)	12
Irish Albums (IRMA)	99
Japanese Albums (Oricon)	43
New Zealand Albums (RMNZ)	8
Scottish Albums (Official Charts)	66
Swedish Albums (Sverigetopplistan)	31
Swiss Albums (Schweizer Hitparade)	18
UK Albums (Official Charts)	53
UK Rock & Metal Albums (Official Charts)	2
US Billboard 200	1
US Top Rock Albums (Billboard)	1

=== Year-end charts ===
Chart (2009)	Position
Canadian Albums (Billboard)	39
US Billboard 200	37
US Digital Albums (Billboard)	22
US Rock Albums (Billboard)	9
Chart (2010)	Position
US Billboard 200	59
US Rock Albums (Billboard)	9

== Certifications ==
Region	Certification	Certified units/sales
Canada (Music Canada)	Platinum	80,000^{^}
United Kingdom (BPI)	Silver	60,000^{‡}
United States (RIAA)	Platinum	1,329,000
^{^} Shipments figures based on certification alone.^{‡} Sales+streaming figures based on certification alone.
