= Outta My Head (Daughtry song) =

Single by Daughtry

from the album Break the Spell
- Released: March 13, 2012
- Recorded: The Cat Room (Los Angeles)
- Genre: Hard rock; post-grunge
- Length: 3:31 (album version)
- Label: RCA
- Songwriters: Chris Daughtry; Marti Frederiksen
- Producer: Howard Benson

Daughtry singles chronology
"Crawling Back to You" (2011)	"Outta My Head" (2012)	"Start of Something Good" (2012)

"Outta My Head" is the third single from Daughtry, the song is featured on their third studio album Break the Spell. It was released as a single on March 13, 2012.

== Music video ==
The music video was directed by Shane Drake and premiered on Vevo on April 12, 2012. It also stars Kelly Hu. The video begins with a montage of what happens in the video. The next scenes shows Chris sitting at a restaurant patio and notices a girl sitting alone across from him. The girl leaves all of a sudden and Chris starts to follow her. Most of the video shows Chris trying to catch up with her. He eventually catches up to her and gives her a cell phone. There are flashbacks scenes showing that the girl left her cell phone at the restaurant and he was just trying to give it back to her. After returning, it is revealed that the girl had purposely left her phone at the restaurant for someone else to pick up. She is then picked up in a black van. The last scene of the video shows that it was all a daydream. Chris sees the same woman leave the restaurant. At first he decides to follow her, but sees that she left her phone behind. He changes his mind and smiles at the camera.

== Live performances ==
Daughtry debuted the song on American Idol on March. On April 30 the band performed the single on Live! with Kelly.

== Chart positions ==
Chart (2012)	Peak position
US Adult Pop Songs (Billboard)	22
