= September (Daughtry song) =

2010 single by Daughtry

Single by Daughtry

from the album Leave This Town
- B-side: "What Have We Become"
- Released: June 1, 2010
- Recorded: September 2008 – March 2009 (Los Angeles)
- Genre: Alternative rock; pop rock
- Length: 4:00 (album version); 3:54 (radio edit)
- Label: RCA
- Songwriters: Chris Daughtry; Josh Steely
- Producer: Howard Benson

Daughtry singles chronology
"Life After You" (2009)	"September" (2010)	"Renegade" (2011)

"September" is the third and final single from Daughtry's second album Leave This Town (2009). This song was co-written by Chris Daughtry and Josh Steely. It was first released June 1, 2010, through RCA Records. The mid-tempo ballad is inspired by Chris's childhood memories growing up with his brother in Lasker, North Carolina.

This song was performed on the ninth season of American Idol on May 12, 2010. "September" debuted at 30 on the Billboard Adult Pop Songs chart.

== Background ==
Daughtry wrote the riff for "September" while he was on tour with Bon Jovi. His bandmate Josh Steely sent Daughtry some lyrical ideas and Chris sent back a lyric based on Steely's outline, which Steely said was "exactly what he was going for, remembering the summer and going back to school". According to Daughtry, "every time I hear that song it takes me back to my summers in Lasker. I loved growing up there, but I knew I'd have leave to make something of my life." The song's lines, "Yeah, we knew we had to leave this town / But we never knew when and we never knew how / We would end up here the way we are" inspired the album's title. Daughtry wanted "September" as a single, and that it should be released "at the time of the year when it will have meaning".

== Music video ==
The music video was shot on July 1, 2010, at the Stevens Center of the University of North Carolina School of the Arts in Winston-Salem, North Carolina and premiered on Vevo on July 16, 2010. The band is shown performing on stage with photos and home videos of them projected behind them.

== Track listing ==
Digital download – single
No.	Title	Writer(s)	Length
1.	"September"	Chris Daughtry; Josh Steely	4:00
2.	"What Have We Become"	Daughtry; Brian Craddock; Steely; Josh Paul; Joey Barnes; Tommy Henriksen	3:43

== Chart performance ==
On the issue dated August 21, 2010, "September" became Daughtry's ninth single to reach the Billboard Hot 100. The single has sold 355,000 digital downloads as of November 24, 2010. On the November 6, 2010 issue, the song reached its peak at number 36 on the Billboard Hot 100, becoming their eighth top-40 single.

=== Weekly charts ===
Chart (2010–2011)	Peak position
Canada Hot 100 (Billboard)	29
Canada AC (Billboard)	4
Canada Hot AC (Billboard)	36
US Billboard Hot 100	36
US Adult Contemporary (Billboard)	2
US Adult Pop Airplay (Billboard)	2
US Pop Airplay (Billboard)	20

=== Year end charts ===
Chart (2010)	Position
US Adult Contemporary (Billboard)	29
US Adult Pop Songs (Billboard)	12

Chart (2011)	Position
US Adult Contemporary (Billboard)	4

== Certifications ==
Region	Certification	Certified units/sales
United States (RIAA)	Gold	500,000^{‡}
^{‡} Sales+streaming figures based on certification alone.

== Release history ==
Region	Date	Format
United States	June 1, 2010	Radio
United States	June 8, 2010	Digital
United Kingdom	August 23, 2010	Digital download
