= No Surprise (Daughtry song) =

Single by Daughtry

from the album Leave This Town
- B-side: "Back Again"
- Released: May 6, 2009
- Recorded: September 2008–March 2009 in Los Angeles, California
- Genre: Alternative rock; pop rock
- Length: 4:29 (album version); 4:09 (single version)
- Label: RCA; 19
- Songwriters: Chris Daughtry; Chad Kroeger; Joey Moi; Rune Westberg; Eric Dill
- Producer: Howard Benson

Daughtry singles chronology
"What About Now" (2008)	"No Surprise" (2009)	"Life After You" (2009)

Music video
- "No Surprise" on YouTube

"No Surprise" is a song recorded by American rock band Daughtry for their second studio album, Leave This Town (2009). It was released May 6, 2009 as the album's lead single, and the band debuted the song on American Idol that night. Chris Daughtry wrote the song with Chad Kroeger, Joey Moi, Eric Dill, and Rune Westberg, while Howard Benson handled the production.

An alternative rock power ballad with influences of pop rock, hard rock, and post-grunge, "No Surprise" utilizes layered vocals and distorted guitars to create a radio-friendly rock sound that has been compared to Kroeger's band Nickelback. Its lyrics depict a bittersweet breakup between lovers that has been a long time coming.

The song was a commercial success in the United States, reaching a peak position of 15 on the Billboard Hot 100 and becoming the group's fourth number one hit on the magazine's Adult Pop Songs airplay chart. It also charted well internationally, peaking at number 13 on the Canadian Hot 100 and being certified Gold by Music Canada, in addition to attaining top 40 positions in Australia, Japan, New Zealand, and Sweden.

== Background ==
"No Surprise" was originally written in 2007 by Eric Dill, which was intended for his debut studio album. However, Chad Kroeger who was in the studio with Daughtry, came across Dill's demo and pictured a heavier sound of the song for the band. Kroeger reached out to Dill and they re-worked the song for a week in Vancouver. Afterwards, he showed the track to Chris Daughtry, which he liked and it was released as the lead single from Leave This Town. The song received a BMI Pop Award for Award-Winning Songs in 2010.

== Composition ==
"No Surprise" is a midtempo alternative rock and pop rock ballad with a duration of four minutes and twenty-nine seconds (4:29) on the album track, or four minutes and nine seconds (4:09) on the single edit. According to the digital sheet music published by Alfred Publishing Co., Inc., the song was originally composed in the key of E♭ major and set in common time (4/4) to a "moderate" tempo of 96 BPM. Daughtry's vocals are double-tracked on the majority of the track and span exactly two octaves, from E♭_{3} to E♭_{5}. Distorted guitars dominate the song's instrumentation, while the production employs a Wall of Sound approach.

Lyrically, the song details the overdue end of an unhealthy relationship and has been described as "anthemic." The narrator appears to have mixed feelings about the breakup, with the chorus alternating between sentimental reflection ("you and I will be a tough act to follow") and relief ("It's no surprise I won't be here tomorrow / Can't believe that I stayed 'til today").

== Reception ==
=== Critical reception ===
Bill Lamb from About.com was positive in his review on the song, giving it four out of five stars and indicating that "No Surprise" is "possibly stronger than any of the singles off their four million selling debut album".

=== Commercial performance ===
"No Surprise" debuted at number fifteen on the Billboard Hot 100 the chart week of May 23, 2009. It is the band's highest debut to date on the chart, fueled by strong first week digital sales of 106,000. It is also the band's fifth top twenty hit on the Hot 100, and their highest-charting song since "Home". In addition, it debuted at number 39 on the Adult Pop Songs chart with less than a week of airplay. For the week of August 27, the song hit number-one, becoming the band's fourth number-one single on the Adult Top 40. Only Nickelback has more number ones with five. The song also reached the top 10 on the Adult Contemporary and Pop Songs charts. As of January 2011, the song has sold over 1,201,000 digital copies in the United States.

On the Canadian Hot 100, "No Surprise" debuted at number thirteen, also making it their fifth top twenty hit in that country. The single was certified Gold by Music Canada in July 2009. The song has also charted moderately well internationally, peaking at 34 in Australia, 45 in Austria, 62 in Germany, 22 in Japan, 22 in New Zealand, and 35 in Sweden.

== Track listing ==
Canadian digital single/US CD single
No.	Title	Writer(s)	Length
1.	"No Surprise"	Chris Daughtry, Chad Kroeger, Joey Moi, Rune Westberg, Eric Dill	4:09
2.	"Back Again"	Daughtry, Adam Gontier	3:38
Total length:			7:47

International digital single/European CD single
No.	Title	Writer(s)	Length
1.	"No Surprise"	Daughtry, Kroeger, Moi, Westberg, Dill	4:09
Total length:			4:09

== Music video ==
The video was directed by Nathan Cox and premiered June 3, 2009. It follows the story of a couple who live together but are struggling to make ends meet. It begins with the man trying to sign up for a mining job, but fails after the foreman tells him there are no work positions available. Meanwhile, the girl works at a diner and is being put off by her irritable boss. Later, she accidentally spills soda on a female customer after being bumped into by another man. The boss yells at her and she storms out, throwing her apron on the ground.

The next camera shot is at the couple's home as their neighbor is leaving for a musical gig. Both argue about their foreclosure of their home. The final segment begins the next morning when the man wakes up and leaves. The girl wakes up and is unable to find him. The video concludes with the girl looking around town (alternating shots between the band and her running through town and bumping into a guy) then, finally, sitting down on the ground, leaning against a big rock wondering what will happen next and the camera pans out and the viewer can see that the couple are sitting on opposite sides of the large boulder. In addition, Daughtry and his band are seen performing at the mining area, and Daughtry is seen with his guitar in some solo performance shots while standing on the ledge of a forklift arm in both day and night scenes.

== Charts ==
=== Weekly charts ===
Weekly chart performance for "No Surprise"
Chart (2009–2010)	Peak position
Australia (ARIA)	34
Austria (Ö3 Austria Top 40)	45
Canada Hot 100 (Billboard)	13
Canada AC (Billboard)	4
Canada CHR/Top 40 (Billboard)	30
Canada Hot AC (Billboard)	2
Germany (GfK)	62
Japan (Japan Hot 100)	22
Lithuania (European Hit Radio)	71
New Zealand (Recorded Music NZ)	22
Sweden (Sverigetopplistan)	35
US Billboard Hot 100	15
US Adult Contemporary (Billboard)	4
US Adult Pop Airplay (Billboard)	1
US Pop Airplay (Billboard)	9

=== Year-end charts ===
Year-end chart performance for "No Surprise"
Chart (2009)	Position
Canada (Canadian Hot 100)	64
US Billboard Hot 100	63
US Adult Contemporary (Billboard)	22
US Adult Pop Songs (Billboard)	2
Chart (2010)	Position
US Adult Contemporary (Billboard)	11

== Certifications and sales ==
Region	Certification	Certified units/sales
Canada (Music Canada)	Gold	20,000^{*}
United States (RIAA)	Platinum	1,201,000
^{*} Sales figures based on certification alone.

== Release history ==
Country	Date	Format	Label	Ref.
Australia	May 6, 2009	Digital download	RCA Records, 19	
Japan	May 6, 2009	Digital download	RCA Records, 19	
New Zealand	May 6, 2009	Digital download	RCA Records, 19	
United States	May 6, 2009	Digital download	RCA Records, 19	
Canada	June 18, 2009	Digital download	RCA Records, 19	
Europe	August 6, 2009	CD single	RCA Records (Sony)	
United States	September 15, 2009	CD single	RCA Records (Sony)	
