= Live at Sturgis 2006 =

- Directed by: Daniel Catullo
- Produced by: Jack Gulick, Daniel Catullo & Nickelback
- Starring: Nickelback
- Distributed by: Coming Home Studios
- Release date: December 2, 2008
- Running time: 155 minutes
- Country: Canada
- Language: English

Live at Sturgis 2006 is a live concert DVD filmed by Canadian rock band, Nickelback. It is the band's first live DVD since 2002's release of Live at Home. The DVD was released exclusively at Walmart stores on December 2, 2008. The concert was filmed in 2006 in Sturgis, South Dakota during the tour supporting their album All the Right Reasons. The concert was at the Sturgis 2006 "Rockin’ The Rally" Show at the Sturgis Bike Rally on August 8, 2006. Filmed in Hi Definition by 15 cameras, there was a crowd of 35,000 attending the performance. The DVD was meant to be released in December 2007, but was delayed to coincide with the release of their album Dark Horse which had come out on November 18, 2008, a year later. The Blu-ray Disc release of Live At Sturgis was released in late 2009. It was certificated Gold by the RIAA.

== Track listing ==
1. "Animals"
2. "Woke Up This Morning"
3. "Photograph"
4. "Because of You"
5. "Far Away"
6. "Never Again"
7. "Savin' Me"
8. "Someday"
9. "Side of a Bullet"
10. "How You Remind Me"
11. "Too Bad"
12. "Figured You Out"

=== Additional content ===
- A behind-the-scenes documentary including backstage interviews with the band.
- The music video for "Rockstar".
- A Sturgis 101 primer.
- A photo gallery of scenes from the concert.

== Certifications ==
Region	Certification	Certified units/sales
Australia (ARIA)	Gold	7,500^{^}
United States (RIAA)	Gold	50,000^{^}
^{^} Shipments figures based on certification alone.
