= VH1 Top 20 Video Countdown =

- Show logo from 2012–15
- Also known as: The 20
- Starring: see host list
- Country of origin: United States
- No. of episodes: 1,028

Production
- Running time: 120 minutes

Original release
- Network: VH1
- Release: October 28, 1994 – November 28, 2015

The 20 (formerly known as the VH1 Top 20 Video Countdown) is a weekly music video countdown television show that aired on the VH1 cable television network in the United States. The long-running show was first introduced in 1994 as VH1 Top 10 Countdown, part of VH1's "Music First" re-branding effort. Over the years, a variety of hosts counted down the top 10 or 20 music videos of the week. The order of countdown was initially decided by a mix of record sales, radio airplay, video spins, message board posts, and conventional mail. The final episode aired unexpectedly without fanfare on November 28, 2015.

== History ==
As part of VH-1's rebranding as "VH1: Music First" in 1994, the channel launched a new show, the VH1 Top 10 Countdown, that counted down the top 10 music videos played on the channel each week. A combination of record sales, radio airplay, video spins, message board posts, and conventional mail decided the order of the countdown. A rotating cast of VJs picked up hosting duties for the show over the years. The show expanded from 10 to 20 music videos, becoming VH1 Top 20 Video Countdown, on April 13, 2001.

Show logo until 2012

Each week, the show was broadcast from another location around New York, often at the Virgin Records store in Union Square. Following a decline in the show's relevance, popular Survivor contestant Jenna Lewis was hired to host the show in 2001. After her departure from the show, from 2002 to 2006, the show was usually hosted by either Rachel Perry, Bradford How, or Aamer Haleem, but occasionally another VJ would fill in. At this point, the show's first airing would premiere on Saturdays at 3:00 AM Eastern, then later at 9:00 AM Eastern, followed by additional airings on Sunday Mornings at 8:00 AM Eastern, and Tuesday mornings at 9:00 AM Eastern. On July 22, 2005, VH1 moved the show's first airing of the week to Friday evenings at 6:00 PM Eastern, followed by additional airings on weekend mornings.

The show became known as the VSPOT Top 20 Video Countdown on April 7, 2006, and had received a new on-air look, a new studio at the MTV headquarters in Times Square (where TRL located at), and a new host, Matt Pinfield, the venerable VJ from both MTV and MTV2 in the 1990s and former host of MTV's 120 Minutes. In a fundamental change from the show's older format of compiling the top 20 videos of the week, online votes resolved the entire order of the countdown. Fan participation was introduced via VSPOT, VH1's online music video outlet. On the week of July 15, 2006, the show stopped airing on Friday evenings.

On the September 16, 2006, episode, Pinfield announced that a video would be retired after being on the countdown for 20 weeks. Before this time, videos could remain on the countdown for as long as seemed appropriate, though almost all were gone by the 24th week. One notable exception, however, was Keane's "Somewhere Only We Know", which remained in the countdown for 28 non-consecutive weeks in two countdown runs. The video only peaked at #8, and its second wind was caused by the popularity of the VH1.com live version of the video.

After Pinfield did not show up for a few recordings of the show on October 7, 2006, former host Aamer Haleem returned to host the show once again. Starting the week of February 17, 2007, after a mass layoff of music producers at MTV Networks (now known as "Paramount Media Networks"), the show left MTV Studios and became broadcast from another location every week, as it was in the late 1990s and early 2000s (decade), starting at New York's Grand Central Terminal. Haleem continued to host the show every week from another location until August 4, 2007, when he hosted his final episode.

Alison Becker became the new host on August 11, 2007. Around this time, the VSPOT online video center was renamed to "Video.VH1.com," so the series readded its original title, VH1 Top 20 Video Countdown. Since then, each episode has usually featured one or two interviews with all celebrities of latest notoriety who either have a video, movie, or TV show of interest at the time. The countdown sometimes has videos high in its countdown despite virtually has no radio airplay for the song. One example is Bret Michaels' Go That Far which was directed by Shane Stanley. This video spent 12 weeks on the countdown and bowed out at #7. The video supported Michaels' show Rock of Love which is shown on the network.

David Cook and David Archuleta, the seventh-season winner and runner-up of American Idol were the first guest stars to introduce their own music video at the #1 spot. Archuleta introduced his video "Crush" on November 15, 2008. The following week, on November 22, 2008, Cook made a guest appearance to introduce his music video for "Light On" which was making its countdown debut at #1. Rock group Shinedown joined the list of introducing a song at #1 when their video for "Second Chance" reached #1 on May 16, 2009. David Cook introduced "Come Back To Me" at #1 on May 30, 2009, making Cook the first to introduce two music videos at #1 on two occasions. Later in 2009, rock group Daughtry introduced their music video for "No Surprise" at #1 on July 18, 2009, and British pop singer Jay Sean introduced his music video for "Down" at #1 on October 17, 2009. After four months of no one introducing their own video at #1, Pop-rock singer Adam Lambert would also join the list as he introduced his video, "Whataya Want from Me," at #1 on February 20, 2010. At VH1's "Winter Wonderland" countdown special, Ireland-based rock group The Script introduced their video, Breakeven at #1 on March 6, 2010. For five months, no one had introduced their song at #1 until August 21, 2010, when hip-hop rapper B.o.B introduced Airplanes at #1. Two months later, on October 9, R&B/pop singer Bruno Mars introduced his #1 single, "Just the Way You Are," at #1. Following a four to five-month absence of an artist introduction at #1, on February 26, 2011, British pop singer Adele introduced "Rolling in the Deep" at #1. On November 5, 2011, pop singer Kelly Clarkson introduced "Mr. Know It All" at #1. On March 24, 2012, British pop singer Neon Hitch introduced "Get Yourself Back Home" at #1. On July 27, 2013, R&B singer Robin Thicke introduced "Blurred Lines" at #1. Since then, no other artists have introduced their own videos at #1.

At the end of the January 3, 2009 broadcast, Becker announced that it would be her last show as host. The new host, Jim Shearer, taped his first show on January 5, 2009, at the Virgin Megastore at Union Square in New York, for broadcast on January 10. In 2009, VH1 took faster control of the songs played on the show, with the number of videos available to be voted onto the Top 20 Countdown reduced to less than 30, and several videos were removed from the voting list while they were still in the top half of the countdown. There was also less competition regarding songs trying to earn a #1 spot due to the lack of song competitions in 2009, as well as four consecutive brand new #1 videos in January 2010.

On September 18, 2010, the show expanded from two hours to two and a half hours. It returned to the original two-hour format on February 11, 2012. On May 14, 2011, the show celebrated its 800th episode. This makes the countdown the longest-running, music-related program on any channel ever in television history. The countdown's 800th #1 video was "Rolling in the Deep" from Adele. On May 11, 2013, the show reached it's 900th episode, and to celebrate, various clips and bloopers from throughout the show's history were featured, and Jim Shearer even wore a tuxedo and tie to commemorate the occasion. The 900th #1 video on the countdown was "Just Give Me A Reason" from Pink featuring Nate Ruess.

In the past, viewers could choose up to 20 videos to vote for at one time by dragging a song into spaces numbered 1-20. Voting was unlimited, allowing viewers to vote however many times they wanted, but in mid-2011, the voting format changed, and viewers could only vote for one video at a time. Votes were also limited to 20 times per day. In 2014, the show's voting was taken away, reverting to the original format of record sales, streaming, radio airplay, video spins, chart performance, and social media hype. Jim Shearer hosted his final episode on December 20, 2014, since his contract was not renewed for 2015. This episode was the annual year-end edition of the countdown, featuring the top twenty songs from throughout the year. At the end of the episode, right after Shearer did his usual weekly sign-off, a slide was displayed featuring relaxing outdoor stock footage and ambient noise, and a text thanking Shearer for 5 years of hosting the countdown. As it turned out, Shearer later revealed that his contract had not been renewed, and that VH1 was planning on revamping the format of the show. From January 10 to April 25, 2015, musical artists and other entertainment personalities guest-hosted the show. Ingrid Michaelson was the first artist to guest-host the show, and was even asked to come back to host another episode on March 21, 2015. Other celebrity hosts included the likes of Christina Perri, Nikki Glaser, and Gavin DeGraw, among others. Comedian Mike Kelton was the final guest co-host on April 25, 2015.

Shannon Coffey was announced as the new host on April 20, 2015, and officially began hosting on May 2, 2015. As part of the planned revamp, the show was renamed The 20, keeping the same video countdown, but introducing new segments and a new studio, as well as an emphasis on short-form content and sketch comedy in addition to the music videos.

On November 28, 2015, the final episode of The 20 aired without ceremony, and the program was canceled without any publicity nor statement as to why. In December 2015, Coffey revealed on X that she had been dropped from the network as VH1 was now “moving away from music”. As such, an end-of-year special aired on December 19, 2015, in the same timeslot called The 2015 Year-End Special hosted by journalist Alicia Quarles, alongside a panel of comedians, but no video of the year was named, and it composed a countdown of 20 pop-culture moments instead of videos. As of December 21, 2015, Paramount Skydance has dropped music videos from the VH1 schedule entirely (the first being BET a year earlier in December with 106 & Park). As of October 10, 2026, reruns of America’s Funniest Home Videos now air in the show's former timeslot.

== Special editions ==
Occasionally, VH1 aired special editions of the Top 20 Video Countdown:

- Fairway to Heaven: The show is condensed to 18 videos and takes place at a celebrity golf tournament. The title is a reference to the song "Stairway to Heaven."
- Lift Ticket to Ride: An annual winter ski party event. The title is a reference to the song "Ticket to Ride."
- VH1's Top 40 Videos of the Year: The year's best videos are counted down with commentary from celebrities. Prior to 2002, the special was a top 50 countdown, and was five hours long to allow most or all of each video to be played. From 2002 to 2011, the special was a top 40 countdown and resembled VH1's occasional "Top 100" countdowns. In 2012, the format of the year-end show changed again, to a top 20 countdown. The special was presented the same way a weekly show would be shown. In 2013, the format changed back to a top 40 countdown. In 2014, the year-end countdown changed back to a top 20 format.
- Rock Across America: Each summer through 2001, the show became a traveling event across nationwide.
- The 20th Anniversary special aired on June 20, 2015. Starting with 1995, each year was represented with a video.
- VH1 You Oughta Know Takeover: This special consisted entirely of music videos and live performances from past and present VH1 You Oughta Know artists. VH1 held this special edition annually for two years in a row. The first YOK Takeover-edition of the countdown aired on November 8, 2014. One year later, on November 7, 2015, a second You Oughta Know-themed episode aired.
- VMA Special: This special edition of The 20 aired for two weeks straight, and was held to promote the upcoming 2015 show. The first VMA-themed edition aired on August 29, 2015, consisting of music videos that were up for nominations in various categories, that year, such as 'Video Of The Year' and 'Best Pop Video'. The following week, The 20 aired a second VMA-themed episode, this time taking place at the Video Music Awards itself. Backstage interviews with artists performing, as well as red carpet appearances by celebrities attending the event were shown alongside each video that had won the 'Video of the Year' award, starting in 1995, and ending with that year's 'Video of the Year' winner, Taylor Swift's 'Bad Blood' video.
- The 20 Halloween Special: This special edition of The 20 aired on October 31, 2015. Host Shannon Coffey hosted the show from New York Haunted Hayride in New York City, and the countdown consisted of Halloween-themed music videos.

== 20/20 Club ==
A video was said to be part of the 20/20 Club when it had been on the countdown for 20 consecutive weeks. On its 20th week, the host would say that it had reached 20 weeks and that it would be the last time it would be shown on the countdown. In 2012, VH1 allowed several music videos to continue to appear on the countdown, despite reaching 20 weeks or more on the chart. In 2013, this process was confirmed by then-current host Jim Shearer, when he stated that the 20/20 Club had ended, and there was no longer a limit to how long videos could appear on the countdown.

=== Videos that spent 20 weeks or more before the 20/20 Club ===
==== 1995 ====
- "Run-Around" - Blues Traveler

==== 1996 ====
- "One Sweet Day" - Mariah Carey featuring Boyz II Men
- "Because You Loved Me" - Celine Dion

==== 1997 ====
- "You Were Meant for Me" – Jewel
- "One Headlight" – The Wallflowers
- "Sunny Came Home" - Shawn Colvin

==== 1998 ====
- "I Don't Want to Miss a Thing" – Aerosmith
- "My Heart Will Go On" – Celine Dion
- "The Way" – Fastball
- "Iris" – Goo Goo Dolls
- "Torn" – Natalie Imbruglia
- "3 a.m." – Matchbox Twenty
- "Real World" – Matchbox Twenty
- "Truly Madly Deeply" – Savage Garden
- "Walkin' on the Sun" – Smash Mouth

==== 1999 ====
- "My Favorite Mistake" – Sheryl Crow
- "Save Tonight" – Eagle Eye Cherry
- "Hands" – Jewel
- "Livin' la Vida Loca" – Ricky Martin
- "Kiss Me" – Sixpence None the Richer
- "Every Morning" – Sugar Ray
- "All Star" – Smash Mouth

==== 2000 ====
- "It's My Life" – Bon Jovi
- "Smooth" – Santana featuring Rob Thomas
- "Kryptonite" – 3 Doors Down
- "Everything You Want" – Vertical Horizon

==== 2001 ====
- "With Arms Wide Open" – Creed
- "Thank You" – Dido
- "I'm Like a Bird" – Nelly Furtado
- "The Way You Love Me" – Faith Hill
- "Superman (It's Not Easy)" – Five For Fighting
- "Hanging by a Moment" – Lifehouse
- "Again" – Lenny Kravitz
- "South Side" – Moby featuring Gwen Stefani
- "When It's Over" – Sugar Ray
- "It's Been A While" – Staind
- "Drops of Jupiter (Tell Me)" – Train
- "Beautiful Day" – U2

==== 2002 ====
- "One Last Breath" – Creed
- "Soak Up the Sun" – Sheryl Crow
- "Everyday" – Dave Matthews Band
- "Wasting My Time" – Default
- "Here is Gone" – Goo Goo Dolls
- "Standing Still" – Jewel
- "How You Remind Me" – Nickelback
- "The Middle" – Jimmy Eat World
- "No Such Thing" – John Mayer
- "Hella Good" – No Doubt
- "Hey Baby" – No Doubt featuring Bounty Killer

==== 2003 ====
- "Landslide" – Dixie Chicks
- "Bring Me to Life" – Evanescence featuring Paul McCoy
- "Unwell" – Matchbox Twenty
- "Your Body is a Wonderland" – John Mayer
- "Harder to Breathe" – Maroon 5
- "The Remedy (I Won't Worry)" – Jason Mraz
- "Underneath It All" – No Doubt featuring Lady Saw
- "The Game of Love" – Santana featuring Michelle Branch
- "Calling All Angels" – Train

==== 2004 ====
- "The First Cut Is the Deepest" – Sheryl Crow
- "My Immortal" – Evanescence
- "The Reason" – Hoobastank
- "If I Ain't Got You" – Alicia Keys
- "Are You Gonna Be My Girl" – Jet
- "This Love" – Maroon 5
- "Someday" – Nickelback
- "It's My Life" – No Doubt

==== 2005 ====
- "I Don't Want to Be" – Gavin DeGraw
- "Holiday" – Green Day
- "You and Me" – Lifehouse
- "Somewhere Only We Know" – Keane
- "Mr. Brightside" – The Killers
- "Let Me Go – 3 Doors Down

==== 2006 ====
- "You're Beautiful" – James Blunt
- "Over My Head (Cable Car)" – The Fray
- "Photograph" – Nickelback
- "Savin' Me" - Nickelback

=== Videos retired to the 20/20 Club ===
==== 2006 ====
- "Not Ready to Make Nice" – Dixie Chicks
- "About Us" – Brooke Hogan ft. Paul Wall
- "Far Away" – Nickelback
- "Buttons" – The Pussycat Dolls ft. Snoop Dogg

==== 2007 ====
- "It Ends Tonight" – The All-American Rejects
- "How To Save A Life" – The Fray
- "If Everyone Cared" – Nickelback
- "U + Ur Hand" – P!nk

==== 2008 ====
- "Pocketful of Sunshine" – Natasha Bedingfield
- "Feels Like Tonight" – Daughtry
- "Whatever It Takes" – Lifehouse
- "Better in Time" – Leona Lewis
- "I'm Yours" – Jason Mraz
- "It's Not My Time" – 3 Doors Down
- "Chasing Pavements" – Adele

==== 2009 ====
- "Gives You Hell" – All-American Rejects
- "Lucky" – Jason Mraz and Colbie Caillat
- "Stay" – Safetysuit
- "Second Chance" – Shinedown

==== 2010 ====
- "Halfway Gone" – Lifehouse (Honorary)
- "Breakeven" – The Script (Honorary)
- "Like You Do" – Angel Taylor

==== 2011 ====
- "Rolling in the Deep" – Adele
- "Jar of Hearts" – Christina Perri
- "For the First Time" – The Script

==== 2012 ====
- "Not Over You" – Gavin DeGraw
- "Somebody That I Used to Know" – Gotye featuring Kimbra
- "Lights" – Ellie Goulding
- "Some Nights" – fun.
- "Domino" – Jessie J
- "Ho Hey" – The Lumineers
- "Everybody Talks" – Neon Trees

==== 2013 ====
- "I Will Wait" - Mumford & Sons
- "It's Time" - Imagine Dragons
- "Next to Me" - Emeli Sandé
- "Counting Stars" - OneRepublic

==== 2014 ====
- "Let Her Go" - Passenger
- "Burn" - Ellie Goulding
- "Am I Wrong" - Nico & Vinz
- "Chandelier" - Sia

==== 2015 ====
- "Sugar" - Maroon 5
- "Talking Body" - Tove Lo

== List of #1's ==
=== 1994 ===
*Video of the Year: "Come to My Window" – Melissa Etheridge

=== 1995 ===
- July 29: "Scream" – Michael Jackson and Janet Jackson
- October 28: "Runaway" – Janet Jackson
- November 4: "As I Lay Me Down" – Sophie B. Hawkins
- November 11: "As I Lay Me Down" – Sophie B. Hawkins
- November 18: "As I Lay Me Down" – Sophie B. Hawkins
- Video of the Year: "Let Her Cry" – Hootie & the Blowfish

=== 1996 ===
- February 10: "One Sweet Day" – Mariah Carey & Boyz II Men
- February 17: "One Sweet Day" – Mariah Carey & Boyz II Men
- March 30: "Because You Loved Me" – Celine Dion
- April 6: "Because You Loved Me" – Celine Dion
- April 13: "Because You Loved Me" – Celine Dion
- April 20: "Because You Loved Me" – Celine Dion
- April 27: "Because You Loved Me" – Celine Dion
- May 4: "Because You Loved Me" – Celine Dion
- May 11: "Because You Loved Me" – Celine Dion
- May 18: "Always Be My Baby" – Mariah Carey
- July 13: "Give Me One Reason" – Tracy Chapman
- July 20: "Give Me One Reason" – Tracy Chapman
- July 27: "Give Me One Reason" – Tracy Chapman
- October 26: "It's All Coming Back to Me Now" – Celine Dion
- Video of the Year: "Ironic" – Alanis Morissette

=== 1997 ===
Date	Song	Artist(s)
March 8	"You Were Meant For Me"	Jewel
March 15	"You Were Meant For Me"	Jewel
March 22	"You Were Meant For Me"	Jewel
March 29	"You Were Meant For Me"	Jewel
April 5	"You Were Meant For Me"	Jewel
April 12	"You Were Meant For Me"	Jewel
April 19	"You Were Meant For Me"	Jewel
April 26	"One Headlight"	The Wallflowers
May 3	"One Headlight"	The Wallflowers
May 10	"One Headlight"	The Wallflowers
May 17	"I Want You"	Savage Garden
May 24	"I Want You"	Savage Garden
June 7	"MMMBop"	Hanson
June 14	"MMMBop"	Hanson
June 21	"MMMBop"	Hanson
June 28	"Sunny Came Home"	Shawn Colvin
July 5	"Bitch"	Meredith Brooks
July 12	"Bitch"	Meredith Brooks
July 19	"Bitch"	Meredith Brooks
July 26	"Bitch"	Meredith Brooks
August 2	"Bitch"	Meredith Brooks
August 9	"Bitch"	Meredith Brooks
August 16	"Bitch"	Meredith Brooks
August 23	"Semi-Charmed Life"	Third Eye Blind
August 30	"Semi-Charmed Life"	Third Eye Blind
September 6	"Semi-Charmed Life"	Third Eye Blind
September 13	"Semi-Charmed Life"	Third Eye Blind
September 20	"Foolish Games"	Jewel
September 27	"Foolish Games"	Jewel
October 4	"Foolish Games"	Jewel
October 11	"Foolish Games"	Jewel
October 18	"Foolish Games"	Jewel
October 25	"Foolish Games"	Jewel
November 1	"Fly"	Sugar Ray feat. Super Cat
November 8	"Fly"	Sugar Ray feat. Super Cat
November 15	"Fly"	Sugar Ray feat. Super Cat
November 22	"Fly"	Sugar Ray feat. Super Cat
November 29	"Tubthumping"	Chumbawamba
December 6	"Tubthumping"	Chumbawamba
December 13	"Tubthumping"	Chumbawamba
December 20	"Walkin' on the Sun"	Smash Mouth
Video of the Year	"One Headlight"	The Wallflowers

=== 1998 ===
Date	Song	Artist(s)
January 10	"Walkin' on the Sun"	Smash Mouth
January 17	"Walkin' on the Sun"	Smash Mouth
January 24	"Walkin' on the Sun"	Smash Mouth
January 31	"Walkin' on the Sun"	Smash Mouth
February 7	"Truly Madly Deeply"	Savage Garden
February 14	"My Heart Will Go On"	Celine Dion
February 21	"My Heart Will Go On"	Celine Dion
February 28	"My Heart Will Go On"	Celine Dion
March 7	"My Heart Will Go On"	Celine Dion
March 14	"My Heart Will Go On"	Celine Dion
March 21	"My Heart Will Go On"	Celine Dion
March 28	"My Heart Will Go On"	Celine Dion
April 4	"My Heart Will Go On"	Celine Dion
April 11	"My Heart Will Go On"	Celine Dion
April 18	"My Heart Will Go On"	Celine Dion
April 25	"3 a.m."	Matchbox Twenty
May 2	"Torn"	Natalie Imbruglia
May 9	"Torn"	Natalie Imbruglia
May 16	"Torn"	Natalie Imbruglia
May 23	"Torn"	Natalie Imbruglia
May 30	"Torn"	Natalie Imbruglia
June 6	"Torn"	Natalie Imbruglia
June 13	"Torn"	Natalie Imbruglia
June 20	"Torn"	Natalie Imbruglia
June 27	"Torn"	Natalie Imbruglia
July 4	"Torn"	Natalie Imbruglia
July 11	"Iris"	Goo Goo Dolls
July 18	"Iris"	Goo Goo Dolls
July 25	"Iris"	Goo Goo Dolls
August 1	"Iris"	Goo Goo Dolls
August 8	"Iris"	Goo Goo Dolls
August 15	"Iris"	Goo Goo Dolls
August 22	"I Don't Want to Miss a Thing"	Aerosmith
August 29	"I Don't Want to Miss a Thing"	Aerosmith
September 5	"I Don't Want to Miss a Thing"	Aerosmith
September 12	"I Don't Want to Miss a Thing"	Aerosmith
September 19	"I Don't Want to Miss a Thing"	Aerosmith
September 26	"I Don't Want to Miss a Thing"	Aerosmith
October 2	"I Don't Want to Miss a Thing"	Aerosmith
October 9	"I Don't Want to Miss a Thing"	Aerosmith
October 16	"I Don't Want to Miss a Thing"	Aerosmith
October 23	"I Don't Want to Miss a Thing"	Aerosmith
October 30	"One Week"	Barenaked Ladies
November 6	"Thank U"	Alanis Morissette
November 13	"Thank U"	Alanis Morissette
November 20	"Thank U"	Alanis Morissette
November 27	"Thank U"	Alanis Morissette
December 4	"Thank U"	Alanis Morissette
December 11	"Thank U"	Alanis Morissette
Video of the Year	"Torn"	Natalie Imbruglia

=== 1999 ===
Date	Song	Artist(s)
January 8	"Hands"	Jewel
January 15	"Hands"	Jewel
January 22	"Hands"	Jewel
January 29	"Hands"	Jewel
February 5	"Hands"	Jewel
February 12	"Angel"	Sarah McLachlan
February 19	"Angel"	Sarah McLachlan
February 26	"Angel"	Sarah McLachlan
March 5	"Believe"	Cher
March 12	"Believe"	Cher
March 19	"Believe"	Cher
March 26	"Believe"	Cher
April 2	"Every Morning"	Sugar Ray
April 9	"Every Morning"	Sugar Ray
April 16	"Every Morning"	Sugar Ray
April 23	"Every Morning"	Sugar Ray
April 30	"Every Morning"	Sugar Ray
May 7	"Every Morning"	Sugar Ray
May 14	"Kiss Me"	Sixpence None the Richer
May 21	"Kiss Me"	Sixpence None the Richer
May 28	"Livin' la Vida Loca"	Ricky Martin
June 4	"Livin' la Vida Loca"	Ricky Martin
June 11	"Livin' la Vida Loca"	Ricky Martin
June 18	"Livin' la Vida Loca"	Ricky Martin
June 25	"Livin' la Vida Loca"	Ricky Martin
July 2	"Livin' la Vida Loca"	Ricky Martin
July 9	"Livin' la Vida Loca"	Ricky Martin
July 16	"Livin' la Vida Loca"	Ricky Martin
July 23	"Livin' la Vida Loca"	Ricky Martin
July 30	"All Star"	Smash Mouth
August 6	"All Star"	Smash Mouth
August 13	"All Star"	Smash Mouth
August 20	"All Star"	Smash Mouth
August 27	"All Star"	Smash Mouth
September 3	"All Star"	Smash Mouth
September 10	"All Star"	Smash Mouth
September 17	"All Star"	Smash Mouth
September 24	"All Star"	Smash Mouth
October 1	"Someday"	Sugar Ray
October 8	"Someday"	Sugar Ray
October 15	"Smooth"	Santana feat. Rob Thomas
October 22	"Smooth"	Santana feat. Rob Thomas
October 29	"Smooth"	Santana feat. Rob Thomas
November 5	"Smooth"	Santana feat. Rob Thomas
November 12	"Smooth"	Santana feat. Rob Thomas
November 19	"Smooth"	Santana feat. Rob Thomas
November 26	"Smooth"	Santana feat. Rob Thomas
December 3	"Smooth"	Santana feat. Rob Thomas
December 10	"Smooth"	Santana feat. Rob Thomas
December 17	"Smooth"	Santana feat. Rob Thomas
Video of the Year	"Smooth"	Santana ft. Rob Thomas

=== 2000 ===
Date	Song	Artist(s)
January 7	"I Knew I Loved You"	Savage Garden
January 14	"I Knew I Loved You"	Savage Garden
January 21	"I Knew I Loved You"	Savage Garden
January 28	"I Knew I Loved You"	Savage Garden
February 4	"I Knew I Loved You"	Savage Garden
February 11	"Smooth"	Santana feat. Rob Thomas
February 18	"Smooth"	Santana feat. Rob Thomas
February 25	"Smooth"	Santana feat. Rob Thomas
March 3	"Smooth"	Santana feat. Rob Thomas
March 10	"What a Girl Wants"	Christina Aguilera
March 17	"What a Girl Wants"	Christina Aguilera
March 24	"That's the Way It Is"	Celine Dion
March 31	"That's the Way It Is"	Celine Dion
April 7	"That's the Way It Is"	Celine Dion
April 14	"That's the Way It Is"	Celine Dion
April 21	"That's the Way It Is"	Celine Dion
April 28	"Everything You Want"	Vertical Horizon
May 5	"Everything You Want"	Vertical Horizon
May 12	"Everything You Want"	Vertical Horizon
May 19	"Everything You Want"	Vertical Horizon
May 26	"Everything You Want"	Vertical Horizon
June 2	"Higher"	Creed
June 9	"Higher"	Creed
June 16	"Higher"	Creed
June 23	"Higher"	Creed
June 30	"Higher"	Creed
July 7	"Bent"	Matchbox Twenty
July 14	"Bent"	Matchbox Twenty
July 21	"Bent"	Matchbox Twenty
July 28	"Absolutely (Story of a Girl)"	Nine Days
August 4	"Absolutely (Story of a Girl)"	Nine Days
August 11	"Absolutely (Story of a Girl)"	Nine Days
August 18	"Absolutely (Story of a Girl)"	Nine Days
August 25	"Desert Rose"	Sting feat. Cheb Mami
September 1	"Desert Rose"	Sting feat. Cheb Mami
September 8	"Desert Rose"	Sting feat. Cheb Mami
September 15	"Kryptonite"	3 Doors Down
September 22	"Music"	Madonna
September 29	"Kryponite"	3 Doors Down
October 6	"Kryponite"	3 Doors Down
October 13	"Music"	Madonna
October 20	"With Arms Wide Open"	Creed
October 27	"With Arms Wide Open"	Creed
November 3	"With Arms Wide Open"	Creed
November 10	"With Arms Wide Open"	Creed
November 17	"Beautiful Day"	U2
November 24	"Beautiful Day"	U2
December 1	"Beautiful Day"	U2
December 8	"Beautiful Day"	U2
December 15	"Beautiful Day"	U2
Video of the Year	"Otherside"	Red Hot Chili Peppers

=== 2001 ===
Date	Song	Artist(s)
January 5	"If You're Gone"	Matchbox Twenty
January 12	"If You're Gone"	Matchbox Twenty
January 19	"Again"	Lenny Kravitz
January 26	"Again"	Lenny Kravitz
February 2	"Again"	Lenny Kravitz
February 9	"Again"	Lenny Kravitz
February 16	"Again"	Lenny Kravitz
February 23	"Love Don't Cost a Thing"	Jennifer Lopez
March 2	"Again"	Lenny Kravitz
March 9	"Again"	Lenny Kravitz
March 16	"Again"	Lenny Kravitz
March 23	"Thank You"	Dido
March 30	"Thank You"	Dido
April 6	"Thank You"	Dido
April 13	"South Side"	Moby feat. Gwen Stefani
April 20	"Thank You"	Dido
April 27	"Thank You"	Dido
May 4	"All for You"	Janet Jackson
May 11	"All for You"	Janet Jackson
May 18	"All for You"	Janet Jackson
May 25	"Hanging by a Moment"	Lifehouse
June 1	"Hanging by a Moment"	Lifehouse
June 8	"Hanging by a Moment"	Lifehouse
June 15	"Hanging by a Moment"	Lifehouse
June 22	"Hanging by a Moment"	Lifehouse
June 30	"Drops of Jupiter (Tell Me)"	Train
July 7	"Drops of Jupiter (Tell Me)"	Train
July 14	"Drops of Jupiter (Tell Me)"	Train
July 21	"Drive"	Incubus
July 28	"Drive"	Incubus
August 4	"Someone to Call My Lover"	Janet Jackson
August 11	"Someone to Call My Lover"	Janet Jackson
August 18	"It's Been Awhile"	Staind
August 25	"It's Been Awhile"	Staind
September 1	"It's Been Awhile"	Staind
September 8	"It's Been Awhile"	Staind
September 15	"It's Been Awhile"	Staind
September 22	"Fallin'"	Alicia Keys
September 29	"Fallin'"	Alicia Keys
October 6	"Fallin'"	Alicia Keys
October 13	"Fallin'"	Alicia Keys
October 20	"Fallin'"	Alicia Keys
October 27	"Fallin'"	Alicia Keys
November 3	"Fallin'"	Alicia Keys
November 10	"Superman (It's Not Easy)"	Five for Fighting
November 17	"Hero"	Enrique Iglesias
December 1	"How You Remind Me"	Nickelback
December 8	"How You Remind Me"	Nickelback
December 15	"How You Remind Me"	Nickelback
Video of the Year	"Drops of Jupiter (Tell Me)"	Train

=== 2002 ===
Date	Song	Artist(s)
January 5	"How You Remind Me"	Nickelback
January 12	"My Sacrifice"	Creed
January 19	"My Sacrifice"	Creed
January 26	"How You Remind Me"	Nickelback
February 2	"How You Remind Me"	Nickelback
February 9	"How You Remind Me"	Nickelback
February 16	"My Sacrifice"	Creed
February 23	"Hey Baby"	No Doubt feat. Bounty Killer
March 2	"Hey Baby"	No Doubt feat. Bounty Killer
March 9	"Hey Baby"	No Doubt feat. Bounty Killer
March 16	"Hey Baby"	No Doubt feat. Bounty Killer
March 23	"Hands Clean"	Alanis Morissette
March 30	"Blurry"	Puddle of Mudd
April 6	"Blurry"	Puddle of Mudd
April 13	"Blurry"	Puddle of Mudd
April 20	"Blurry"	Puddle of Mudd
April 27	"Blurry"	Puddle of Mudd
May 4	"Soak Up the Sun"	Sheryl Crow
May 11	"Soak Up the Sun"	Sheryl Crow
May 18	"Don't Let Me Get Me"	P!nk
May 25	"Don't Let Me Get Me"	P!nk
June 1	"Hella Good"	No Doubt
June 8	"Don't Let Me Get Me"	P!nk
June 15	"Hella Good"	No Doubt
June 22	"Hella Good"	No Doubt
June 29	"Hella Good"	No Doubt
July 6	"Soak Up the Sun"	Sheryl Crow
July 13	"Hero"	Chad Kroeger feat. Josey Scott
July 20	"Hero"	Chad Kroeger feat. Josey Scott
July 27	"Hero"	Chad Kroeger feat. Josey Scott
August 3	"Soak Up the Sun"	Sheryl Crow
August 10	"No Such Thing"	John Mayer
August 17	"No Such Thing"	John Mayer
August 24	"No Such Thing"	John Mayer
August 31	"No Such Thing"	John Mayer
September 7	"One Last Breath"	Creed
September 14	"One Last Breath"	Creed
September 21	"Just Like a Pill"	P!nk
September 28	"One Last Breath"	Creed
October 5	"One Last Breath"	Creed
October 12	"Underneath It All"	No Doubt feat. Lady Saw
October 19	"Underneath It All"	No Doubt feat. Lady Saw
October 26	"Underneath It All"	No Doubt feat. Lady Saw
November 2	"Underneath It All"	No Doubt feat. Lady Saw
November 9	"Underneath It All"	No Doubt feat. Lady Saw
November 16	"Die Another Day"	Madonna
November 23	"The Game of Love"	Santana feat. Michelle Branch
November 30	"The Game of Love"	Santana feat. Michelle Branch
December 7	"The Game of Love"	Santana feat. Michelle Branch
December 14	"The Game of Love"	Santana feat. Michelle Branch
Video of the Year	"Soak Up the Sun"	Sheryl Crow

=== 2003 ===
Date	Song	Artist(s)
January 4	"I'm Gonna Getcha Good!"	Shania Twain
January 11	"Family Portrait"	P!nk
January 18	"Landslide"	Dixie Chicks
January 25	"Landslide"	Dixie Chicks
February 1	"Landslide"	Dixie Chicks
February 8	"I'm With You"	Avril Lavigne
February 15	"I'm With You"	Avril Lavigne
February 22	"Picture"	Kid Rock and Sheryl Crow
March 1	"Picture"	Kid Rock and Sheryl Crow
March 8	"All I Have"	Jennifer Lopez feat. LL Cool J
March 15	"All I Have"	Jennifer Lopez feat. LL Cool J
March 22	"Picture"	Kid Rock and Sheryl Crow
March 29	"When I'm Gone"	3 Doors Down
April 5	"When I'm Gone"	3 Doors Down
April 12	"When I'm Gone"	3 Doors Down
April 19	"When I'm Gone"	3 Doors Down
April 26	"When I'm Gone"	3 Doors Down
May 3	"Unwell"	Matchbox Twenty
May 10	"Unwell"	Matchbox Twenty
May 17	"Unwell"	Matchbox Twenty
May 24	"I'm Glad"	Jennifer Lopez
May 31	"Unwell"	"Matchbox Twenty
June 7	"Unwell"	"Matchbox Twenty
June 14	"Bring Me to Life"	Evanescence feat. Paul McCoy
June 21	"Bring Me to Life"	Evanescence feat. Paul McCoy
June 28	"Unwell"	Matchbox Twenty
July 5	"Unwell"	Matchbox Twenty
July 22	"Calling All Angels"	Train
July 19	"Unwell"	Matchbox Twenty
July 26	"Intuition"	Jewel
August 2	"Intuition"	Jewel
August 9	"Crazy in Love"	Beyoncé feat. Jay-Z
August 16	"Crazy in Love"	Beyoncé feat. Jay-Z
August 23	"Crazy in Love"	Beyoncé feat. Jay-Z
August 30	"Where Is the Love?"	The Black Eyed Peas feat. Justin Timberlake
September 6	"Where Is the Love?"	The Black Eyed Peas feat. Justin Timberlake
September 13	"Where Is the Love?"	The Black Eyed Peas feat. Justin Timberlake
September 20	"Where Is the Love?"	The Black Eyed Peas feat. Justin Timberlake
September 27	"The Remedy (I Won't Worry)"	Jason Mraz
October 4	"The Remedy (I Won't Worry)"	Jason Mraz
October 11	"Stacy's Mom"	Fountains of Wayne
October 18	"Harder to Breathe"	Maroon 5
October 25	"Stacy's Mom"	Fountains of Wayne
November 1	"Baby Boy"	Beyoncé feat. Sean Paul
November 8	"Here Without You"	3 Doors Down
November 15	"Here Without You"	3 Doors Down
November 22	"Hey Ya!"	OutKast
November 29	"Hey Ya!"	OutKast
December 6	"Hey Ya!"	OutKast
December 13	"It's My Life"	No Doubt
Video of the Year	"Unwell"	Matchbox Twenty

=== 2004 ===
Date	Song	Artist(s)
January 3	"Someday"	Nickelback
January 10	"The First Cut Is the Deepest"	Sheryl Crow
January 17	"Someday"	Nickelback
January 24	"Someday"	Nickelback
January 31	"It's My Life"	No Doubt
February 7	"The Way You Move"	OutKast feat. Sleepy Brown
February 14	"Someday"	Nickelback
February 21	"Someday"	Nickelback
February 28	"The Way You Move"	OutKast feat. Sleepy Brown
March 6	"My Immortal"	Evanescence
March 13	"My Immortal"	Evanescence
March 20	"My Immortal"	Evanescence
March 27	"This Love"	Maroon 5
April 3	"This Love"	Maroon 5
April 10	"Yeah!"	Usher featuring Ludacris & Lil' Jon
April 17	"Yeah!"	Usher featuring Ludacris & Lil' Jon
April 24	"This Love"	Maroon 5
May 1	"Yeah!"	Usher feat. Ludacris & Lil' Jon
May 8	"The Reason"	Hoobastank
May 15	"The Reason"	Hoobastank
May 22	"Naughty Girl"	Beyoncé
May 29	"The Reason"	Hoobastank
June 5	"Naughty Girl"	Beyoncé
June 12	"Burn"	Usher
June 19	"The Reason"	Hoobastank
June 26	"Burn"	Usher
July 3	"Roses"	OutKast
July 10	"Roses"	OutKast
July 17	"Roses"	OutKast
July 24	"The Reason"	Hoobastank
July 31	"The Reason"	Hoobastank
August 7	"If I Ain't Got You"	Alicia Keys
August 14	"Confessions"	Usher
August 21	"If I Ain't Got You"	Alicia Keys
August 28	"She Will Be Loved"	Maroon 5
September 4	"She Will Be Loved"	Maroon 5
September 11	"Let's Get It Started"	The Black Eyed Peas
September 18	"She Will Be Loved"	Maroon 5
September 25	"She Will Be Loved"	Maroon 5
October 2	"She Will Be Loved"	Maroon 5
October 9	"Let's Get It Started"	The Black Eyed Peas
October 16	"She Will Be Loved"	Maroon 5
October 23	"She Will Be Loved"	Maroon 5
October 30	"She Will Be Loved"	Maroon 5
November 6	"My Boo"	Usher and Alicia Keys
November 13	"My Boo"	Usher and Alicia Keys
November 20	"Just Lose It"	Eminem
November 27	"Just Lose It"	Eminem
December 4	"Vertigo"	U2
December 11	"My Boo"	Usher and Alicia Keys
Video of the Year	"Yeah!"	Usher feat. Ludacris and Lil' Jon

=== 2005 ===
Date	Song	Artist(s)
January 8	"Over and Over"	Nelly feat. Tim McGraw
January 15	"I Don't Want to Be"	Gavin DeGraw
January 22	"Over and Over"	Nelly feat. Tim McGraw
January 29	"Boulevard of Broken Dreams"	Green Day
February 5	"Boulevard of Broken Dreams"	Green Day
February 12	"Boulevard of Broken Dreams"	Green Day
February 19	"Since U Been Gone"	Kelly Clarkson
February 26	"Boulevard of Broken Dreams"	Green Day
March 5	"Boulevard of Broken Dreams"	Green Day
March 12	"Rich Girl"	Gwen Stefani feat. Eve
March 19	"Boulevard of Broken Dreams"	Green Day
March 26	"Rich Girl"	Gwen Stefani feat. Eve
April 2	"Caught Up"	Usher
April 9	"Caught Up"	Usher
April 16	"Karma"	Alicia Keys
April 23	"Lonely No More"	Rob Thomas
April 30	"Karma"	Alicia Keys
May 7	"Karma"	Alicia Keys
May 14	"Hollaback Girl"	Gwen Stefani
May 21	"Let Me Go"	3 Doors Down
May 28	"Hollaback Girl"	Gwen Stefani
June 4	"Hollaback Girl"	Gwen Stefani
June 11	"Let Me Go"	3 Doors Down
June 19	"We Belong Together"	Mariah Carey
June 25	"Don't Phunk With My Heart"	The Black Eyed Peas
July 2	"We Belong Together"	Mariah Carey
July 9	"We Belong Together"	Mariah Carey
June 16	"Don't Phunk With My Heart"	The Black Eyed Peas
June 23	"We Belong Together"	Mariah Carey
July 30	"Don't Phunk With My Heart"	The Black Eyed Peas
August 6	"We Belong Together"	Mariah Carey
August 13	"Don't Cha"	Pussycat Dolls feat. Busta Rhymes
August 20	"Don't Cha"	Pussycat Dolls feat. Busta Rhymes
August 27	"Don't Cha"	Pussycat Dolls feat. Busta Rhymes
September 3	"Don't Cha"	Pussycat Dolls feat. Busta Rhymes
September 10	"You and Me"	Lifehouse
September 17	"Lose Control"	Missy Elliott feat. Ciara & Fatman Scoop
September 24	"Shake It Off"	Mariah Carey
October 1	"Shake It Off"	Mariah Carey
October 8	"Shake It Off"	Mariah Carey
October 15	"Beverly Hills"	Weezer
October 22	"Shake It Off"	Mariah Carey
October 29	"Gold Digger"	Kanye West feat. Jamie Foxx
November 5	"Because of You"	Kelly Clarkson
November 12	"Because of You"	Kelly Clarkson
November 19	"Gold Digger"	Kanye West
November 26	"Because of You"	Kelly Clarkson
December 3	"Because of You"	Kelly Clarkson
December 10	"Because of You"	Kelly Clarkson
December 17	"Photograph"	Nickelback
Video of the Year	"We Belong Together"	Mariah Carey

=== 2006 ===
Date	Song	Artist(s)
January 7	"Don't Forget About Us"	Mariah Carey
January 14	"Stickwitu"	Pussycat Dolls
January 21	"Check On It"	Beyoncé feat. Slim Thug and Bun B
January 28	"Check On It"	Beyoncé feat. Slim Thug and Bun B
February 4	"Check On It"	Beyoncé feat. Slim Thug and Bun B
February 11	"Check On It"	Beyoncé feat. Slim Thug and Bun B
February 18	"Check On It"	Beyoncé feat. Slim Thug and Bun B
February 25	"You're Beautiful"	James Blunt
March 4	"Check On It"	Beyoncé feat. Slim Thug and Bun B
March 11	"Check On It"	Beyoncé feat. Slim Thug and Bun B
March 18	"Unwritten"	Natasha Bedingfield
March 25	"Be Without You"	Mary J. Blige
April 1	"Be Without You"	Mary J. Blige
April 8	"The Real Thing"	Bo Bice
April 15	"Afterglow"	INXS
April 22	"The Real Thing"	Bo Bice
April 29	"Walk Away"	Kelly Clarkson
May 6	"Who Says You Can't Go Home"	Bon Jovi with Jennifer Nettles
May 13	"Savin' Me"	Nickelback
May 20	"SOS"	Rihanna
May 27	"Walk Away"	Kelly Clarkson
June 3	"Not Ready to Make Nice"	Dixie Chicks
June 10	"The Mixed Tape"	Jack's Mannequin
June 17	"Who Says You Can't Go Home"	Bon Jovi with Jennifer Nettles
June 24	"Not Ready to Make Nice"	Dixie Chicks
July 1	"Not Ready to Make Nice"	Dixie Chicks
July 8	"Not Ready to Make Nice"	Dixie Chicks
July 15	"Not Ready to Make Nice"	Dixie Chicks
July 22	"Not Ready to Make Nice"	Dixie Chicks
July 29	"Not Ready to Make Nice"	Dixie Chicks
August 5	"Not Ready to Make Nice"	Dixie Chicks
August 12	"Not Ready to Make Nice"	Dixie Chicks
August 19	"Not Ready to Make Nice"	Dixie Chicks
August 26	"Not Ready to Make Nice"	Dixie Chicks
September 2	"Not Ready to Make Nice"	Dixie Chicks
September 9	"Not Ready to Make Nice"	Dixie Chicks
September 16	"Not Ready to Make Nice"	Dixie Chicks
September 23	"About Us"	Brooke feat. Paul Wall
September 30	"About Us"	Brooke feat. Paul Wall
October 7	"Far Away"	Nickelback
October 14	"White & Nerdy"	"Weird Al" Yankovic
October 21	"About Us"	Brooke feat. Paul Wall
October 28	"Far Away"	Nickelback
November 4	"White & Nerdy"	"Weird Al" Yankovic
November 11	"White & Nerdy"	"Weird Al" Yankovic
November 18	"Far Away"	Nickelback
November 25	"Far Away"	Nickelback
December 2	"White & Nerdy"	"Weird Al" Yankovic
December 9	"White & Nerdy"	"Weird Al" Yankovic
Video of the Year	"Buttons"	Pussycat Dolls feat. Snoop Dogg

=== 2007 ===
Date	Song	Artist(s)
January 6	"Irreplaceable"	Beyoncé
January 13	"If Everyone Cared"	Nickelback
January 20	"It's Not Over"	Daughtry
January 27	"It's Not Over"	Daughtry
February 3	"It's Not Over"	Daughtry
February 10	"It's Not Over"	Daughtry
February 17	"Into the Ocean"	Blue October
February 24	"It's Not Over"	Daughtry
March 3	"It's Not Over"	Daughtry
March 10	"Candyman"	Christina Aguilera
March 17	"It's Not Over"	Daughtry
March 24	"Read My Mind"	The Killers
March 31	"It's Not Over"	Daughtry
April 7	"It's Not Over"	Daughtry
April 14	"Over It"	Katharine McPhee
April 21	"Over It"	Katharine McPhee
April 28	"Over It"	Katharine McPhee
May 5	"Home"	Daughtry
May 12	"Home"	Daughtry
May 19	"Home"	Daughtry
May 26	"(You Want To) Make a Memory"	Bon Jovi
June 2	"Home"	Daughtry
June 9	"(You Want To) Make a Memory"	Bon Jovi
June 16	"Wait for You"	Elliott Yamin
June 23	"Home"	Daughtry
June 30	"Wait for You"	Elliott Yamin
July 7	"Wait for You"	Elliott Yamin
July 14	"Wait for You"	Elliott Yamin
July 21	"Wait for You"	Elliott Yamin
July 28	"Wait for You"	Elliott Yamin
August 4	"Hey There Delilah"	Plain White T's
August 11	"Big Girls Don't Cry"	Fergie
August 18	"Wait for You"	Elliott Yamin
August 25	"Hey There Delilah"	Plain White T's
September 8	"Do It"	Nelly Furtado
September 15	"Do It"	Nelly Furtado
September 22	"Rockstar"	Nickelback
September 29	"Rockstar"	Nickelback
October 6	"Over You"	Daughtry
October 13	"Over You"	Daughtry
October 20	"Over You"	Daughtry
October 27	"Over You"	Daughtry
November 3	"Over You"	Daughtry
November 10	"Over You"	Daughtry
November 17	"No One"	Alicia Keys
November 24	"Witness"	Bo Bice
December 1	"No One"	Alicia Keys
December 8	"Witness"	Bo Bice
December 15	"Witness"	Bo Bice
Video of the Year	"Big Girls Don't Cry"	Fergie

=== 2008 ===
Date	Song	Artist(s)
January 5	"No One"	Alicia Keys
January 12	"No One"	Alicia Keys
January 19	"Tattoo"	Jordin Sparks
January 26	"In God's Hands"	Nelly Furtado
February 2	"Feels Like Tonight"	Daughtry
February 9	"Feels Like Tonight"	Daughtry
February 16	"Feels Like Tonight"	Daughtry
February 23	"Feels Like Tonight"	Daughtry
March 1	"Feels Like Tonight"	Daughtry
March 8	"Feels Like Tonight"	Daughtry
March 15	"Don't Stop the Music"	Rihanna
March 22	"Feels Like Tonight"	Daughtry
March 29	"Bleeding Love"	Leona Lewis
April 5	"Feels Like Tonight"	Daughtry
April 12	"Feels Like Tonight"	Daughtry
April 19	"Bleeding Love"	Leona Lewis
April 26	"Touch My Body"	Mariah Carey
May 3	"Feels Like Tonight"	Daughtry
May 10	"Stop and Stare"	OneRepublic
May 17	"Bleeding Love"	Leona Lewis
May 24	"No Air"	Jordin Sparks feat. Chris Brown
May 31	"Bleeding Love"	Leona Lewis
June 7	"It's Not My Time"	3 Doors Down
June 14	"Bleeding Love"	Leona Lewis
June 21	"Summertime"	New Kids on the Block
June 28	"Summertime"	New Kids on the Block
July 5	"All Summer Long"	Kid Rock
July 12	"Summertime"	New Kids on the Block
July 19	"Better in Time"	Leona Lewis
July 26	"Summertime"	New Kids on the Block
August 2	"Pocketful of Sunshine"	Natasha Bedingfield
August 9	One Step at a Time"	Jordin Sparks
August 16	"Better in Time"	Leona Lewis
August 23	Pocketful of Sunshine"	Natasha Bedingfield
August 30	What About Now"	Daughtry
September 6	"Better in Time"	Leona Lewis
September 13	"What About Now"	Daughtry
September 20	"What About Now"	Daughtry
September 27	"Better in Time"	Leona Lewis
October 4	"What About Now"	Daughtry
October 11	"Crush"	David Archuleta
October 18	"Crush"	David Archuleta
October 25	"Crush"	David Archuleta
November 1	"Crush"	David Archuleta
November 8	"Better in Time"	Leona Lewis
November 15	"Crush"	David Archuleta
November 22	"Light On"	David Cook
November 29	"Crush"	David Archuleta
December 6	"Light On"	David Cook
December 13	"Crush"	David Archuleta
Video of the Year	"Bleeding Love"	Leona Lewis

=== 2009 ===
Date	Song	Artist(s)
January 3	"Light On"	David Cook
January 10	"Single Ladies (Put a Ring on It)"	Beyoncé
January 17	"Single Ladies (Put a Ring on It)"	Beyoncé
January 24	"Gotta Be Somebody"	Nickelback
January 31	"Love Story"	Taylor Swift
February 7	"Love Story"	Taylor Swift
February 14	"Gives You Hell"	The All-American Rejects
February 21	"Sober"	P!nk
February 28	"My Life Would Suck Without You"	Kelly Clarkson
March 7	"My Life Would Suck Without You"	Kelly Clarkson
March 14	"Thinking of You"	Katy Perry
March 21	"Gives You Hell"	The All-American Rejects
March 28	"Thinking of You"	Katy Perry
April 4	"Lucky"	Jason Mraz feat. Colbie Caillat
April 11	"My Life Would Suck Without You"	Kelly Clarkson
April 18	"Thinking of You"	Katy Perry
April 25	"Lucky"	Jason Mraz feat. Colbie Caillat
May 2	"Poker Face"	Lady Gaga
May 9	"Lucky"	Jason Mraz feat. Colbie Caillat
May 16	"Second Chance"	Shinedown
May 23	"I Do Not Hook Up"	Kelly Clarkson
May 30	"Come Back to Me"	David Cook
June 6	"If Today Was Your Last Day"	Nickelback
June 13	"Come Back to Me"	David Cook
June 20	"Second Chance"	Shinedown
June 27	"I Do Not Hook Up"	Kelly Clarkson
July 4	"No Surprise"	Daughtry
July 11	"Her Diamonds"	Rob Thomas
July 18	"No Surprise"	Daughtry
July 25	"LoveGame"	Lady Gaga
August 1	"Stay"	SafetySuit
August 8	"Her Diamonds"	Rob Thomas
August 15	"Battlefield"	Jordin Sparks
August 22	"21 Guns"	Green Day
August 29	"You Belong With Me"	Taylor Swift
September 5	"Already Gone"	Kelly Clarkson
September 12	"You Belong With Me"	Taylor Swift
September 19	"21 Guns"	Green Day
September 26	"Already Gone"	Kelly Clarkson
October 3	"You Belong With Me"	Taylor Swift
October 10	"Down"	Jay Sean feat. Lil' Wayne
October 17	"Down"	Jay Sean feat. Lil' Wayne
October 24	"Paparazzi"	Lady Gaga
October 31	"Party in the U.S.A."	Miley Cyrus
November 7	"Fireflies"	Owl City
November 14	"Fireflies"	Owl City
November 21	"We Weren't Born to Follow"	Bon Jovi
November 28	"3"	Britney Spears
December 5	"Someday"	Rob Thomas
December 12	"Bad Romance"	Lady Gaga
Video of the Year	"Poker Face"	Lady Gaga

=== 2010 ===
Date	Song	Artist(s)
January 2	"Fifteen"	Taylor Swift
January 9	"Never Gonna Be Alone"	Nickelback
January 16	"Life After You"	Daughtry
January 23	"Live Like We're Dying"	Kris Allen
January 30	"Whataya Want from Me"	Adam Lambert
February 6	"Live Like We're Dying"	Kris Allen
February 13	"Whataya Want from Me"	Adam Lambert
February 20	"Whataya Want from Me"	Adam Lambert
February 27	"Halfway Gone"	Lifehouse
March 6	"Breakeven"	The Script
March 13	"Whataya Want from Me"	Adam Lambert
March 20	"Need You Now"	Lady Antebellum
March 27	"Whatya Want from Me"	Adam Lambert
April 3	"Telephone"	Lady Gaga feat. Beyoncé
April 10	"Need You Now"	Lady Antebellum
April 17	"Need You Now"	Lady Antebellum
April 24	"Telephone"	Lady Gaga feat. Beyoncé
May 1	"Breakeven"	The Script
May 8	"Young Forever"	Jay-Z feat. Mr. Hudson
May 15	"I Never Told You"	Colbie Caillat
May 22	"Young Forever"	Jay-Z feat. Mr. Hudson
May 29	"OMG"	Usher feat. will.i.am
June 5	"OMG"	Usher feat. will.i.am
June 12	"I Never Told You"	Colbie Caillat
June 19	"Can't Be Tamed"	Miley Cyrus
June 26	"O.M.G."	Usher feat. will.i.am
July 3	"If I Had You"	Adam Lambert
July 10	"If I Had You"	Adam Lambert
July 17	"California Gurls"	Katy Perry
July 24	"Airplanes"	B.o.B feat. Hayley Williams
July 31	"Billionaire"	Travie McCoy feat.Bruno Mars
August 7	"Airplanes"	B.o.B feat. Hayley Williams
August 14	"Half of My Heart"	John Mayer feat. Taylor Swift
August 21	"Airplanes"	B.o.B feat. Hayley Williams
August 28	"King of Anything"	Sara Bareilles
September 4	"Love the Way You Lie"	Eminem feat. Rihanna
September 11	"Teenage Dream"	Katy Perry
September 18	"Teenage Dream"	Katy Perry
September 25	"Mine"	Taylor Swift
October 2	"September"	Daughtry
October 9	"Just the Way You Are"	Bruno Mars
October 16	"September"	Daughtry
October 23	"DJ Got Us Fallin' in Love"	Usher feat. Pitbull
October 30	"Mine"	Taylor Swift
November 6	"Just The Way You Are"	Bruno Mars
November 13	"Only Girl (In The World)"	Rihanna
November 20	"Jar of Hearts"	Christina Perri
November 27	"Firework"	Katy Perry
December 4	"Raise Your Glass"	P!nk
December 11	"Firework"	Katy Perry
Video of the Year	"Hey, Soul Sister"	Train

=== 2011 ===
Date	Song	Artist(s)
January 8	"Grenade"	Bruno Mars
January 15	"Grenade"	Bruno Mars
January 22	"We R Who We R"	Kesha
January 28	"For the First Time"	The Script
February 5	"Rolling in the Deep"	Adele
February 12	"For the First Time"	The Script
February 19	"Perfect"	P!nk
February 26	"Rolling in the Deep"	Adele
March 5	"Hold It Against Me"	Britney Spears
March 12	"Rolling in the Deep"	Adele
March 19	"The Cave"	Mumford and Sons
March 26	"Perfect"	P!nk
April 2	"Forget You"	Cee Lo Green
April 9	"Born This Way"	Lady Gaga
April 16	"Rolling in the Deep"	Adele
April 23	"Rope"	Foo Fighters
April 30	E.T."	Katy Perry feat. Kanye West
May 7	"Give a Little"	Hanson
May 14	"Rolling in the Deep"	Adele
May 21	"Rolling in the Deep"	Adele
May 28	"E.T."	Katy Perry feat. Kanye West
June 4	"Rolling in the Deep"	Adele
June 11	The Lazy Song"	Bruno Mars
June 18	"On the Floor"	Jennifer Lopez feat. Pitbull
June 25	"The Lazy Song"	Bruno Mars
July 2	"The Story of Us"	Taylor Swift
July 9	"Save Me, San Francisco"	Train
July 16	"Last Friday Night (T.G.I.F.)"	Katy Perry
July 23	"The Last Goodbye"	David Cook
July 30	"The Edge of Glory"	Lady Gaga
August 6	"Good Life"	OneRepublic
August 13	I Wanna Go"	Britney Spears
August 20	"Good Life"	OneRepublic
August 27	"If I Die Young"	The Band Perry
September 3	"Skyscraper"	Demi Lovato
September 10	"Pumped Up Kicks"	Foster the People
September 17	"Stereo Hearts"	Gym Class Heroes feat. Adam Levine
September 24	"Nothing"	The Script
October 1	"The Adventures of Rain Dance Maggie"	Red Hot Chili Peppers
October 8	"Nothing"	The Script
October 15	"Stereo Hearts"	Gym Class Heroes feat. Adam Levine
October 22	"Someone Like You"	Adele
October 29	"Someone Like You"	Adele
November 5	"Mr. Know It All"	Kelly Clarkson
November 12	"Someone Like You"	Adele
November 19	"Mr. Know It All"	Kelly Clarkson
November 26	"Mr. Know It All"	Kelly Clarkson
December 3	"Without You"	David Guetta feat. Usher
December 10	"The One That Got Away"	Katy Perry
Video of the Year	"Rolling in the Deep"	Adele

=== 2012 ===
Date	Song	Artist(s)
January 7	"The One That Got Away"	Katy Perry
January 14	"It Will Rain"	Bruno Mars
January 21	"We Found Love"	Rihanna feat. Calvin Harris
January 28	"It Will Rain"	Bruno Mars
February 4	"Domino"	Jessie J
February 11	"Set Fire to the Rain"	Adele
February 18	"Set Fire to the Rain"	Adele
February 25	"Set Fire to the Rain"	Adele
March 3	"Stronger (What Doesn't Kill You)"	Kelly Clarkson
March 10	"Domino"	Jessie J
March 17	"Stronger (What Doesn't Kill You)"	Kelly Clarkson
March 24	"Ass Back Home"	Gym Class Heroes feat. Neon Hitch
March 31	"Somebody That I Used to Know"	Gotye feat. Kimbra
April 7	"Drive By"	Train
April 14	"Part of Me"	Katy Perry
April 21	"We Are Young"	fun. feat. Janelle Monáe
April 28	"We Are Young"	fun. feat. Janelle Monáe
May 5	"We Are Young"	fun. feat. Janelle Monáe
May 12	"We Are Young"	fun. feat. Janelle Monáe
May 19	"Somebody That I Used to Know"	Gotye feat. Kimbra
May 26	"Somebody That I Used to Know"	Gotye feat. Kimbra
June 2	"I Won't Give Up" (VH1 Story Tellers version)	Jason Mraz
June 9	"Call Me Maybe"	Carly Rae Jepsen
June 16	"Payphone"	Maroon 5 feat. Wiz Khalifa
June 23	"Payphone"	Maroon 5 feat. Wiz Khalifa
June 30	"Lights"	Ellie Goulding
July 7	"Payphone"	Maroon 5 feat. Wiz Khalifa
July 14	"Where Have You Been"	Rihanna
July 21	"Wide Awake"	Katy Perry
July 28	"Scream"	Usher
August 4	"Wide Awake"	Katy Perry
August 11	"Wide Awake"	Katy Perry
August 18	"Titanium"	David Guetta feat. Sia
August 25	"Blow Me (One Last Kiss)"	P!nk
September 1	"Give Your Heart a Break"	Demi Lovato
September 8	"Whistle"	Flo Rida
September 15	"Whistle"	Flo Rida
September 22	"Blow Me (One Last Kiss)"	P!nk
September 29	"Blow Me (One Last Kiss)"	P!nk
October 6	"Everybody Talks"	Neon Trees
October 13	"One More Night"	Maroon 5
October 20	"One More Night"	Maroon 5
October 27	"We Are Never Ever Getting Back Together"	Taylor Swift
November 3	"Some Nights"	fun.
November 10	"We Are Never Ever Getting Back Together"	Taylor Swift
November 17	"Too Close"	Alex Clare
November 24	"Feel Again"	OneRepublic
December 1	"Home"	Phillip Phillips
December 8	"Locked Out of Heaven"	Bruno Mars
December 15	"Locked Out of Heaven"	Bruno Mars
Video of the Year	"Somebody That I Used to Know"	Gotye feat. Kimbra

=== 2013 ===
Date	Song	Artist(s)
January 5	"Ho Hey"	The Lumineers
January 12	"Ho Hey"	The Lumineers
January 19	"Ho Hey"	The Lumineers
January 26	"I Knew You Were Trouble"	Taylor Swift
February 2	"I Knew You Were Trouble"	Taylor Swift
February 9	"Try"	P!nk
February 16	"I Will Wait"	Mumford & Sons
February 23	"I Knew You Were Trouble"	Taylor Swift
March 2	"Daylight (Playing for Change)"	Maroon 5
March 9	"Daylight (Playing for Change)"	Maroon 5
March 16	"Catch My Breath"	Kelly Clarkson
March 23	"Daylight (Playing for Change)"	Maroon 5
March 30	"When I Was Your Man"	Bruno Mars
April 6	"Daylight (Playing for Change)"	Maroon 5
April 13	"When I Was Your Man"	Bruno Mars
April 20	"Carry On"	fun.
April 27	"When I Was Your Man"	Bruno Mars
May 4	"Stay"	Rihanna feat. Mikky Ekko
May 11	"Just Give Me a Reason"	P!nk feat. Nate Ruess
May 18	"Next to Me"	Emeli Sandé
May 25	"Heart Attack"	Demi Lovato
June 1	"Lego House"	Ed Sheeran
June 8	"Heart Attack"	Demi Lovato
June 15	"Can't Hold Us"	Macklemore & Ryan Lewis feat. Ray Dalton
June 22	"Mirrors"	Justin Timberlake
June 29	"Can't Hold Us"	Macklemore & Ryan Lewis feat. Ray Dalton
July 6	"Can't Hold Us"	Macklemore & Ryan Lewis feat. Ray Dalton
July 13	"Radioactive"	Imagine Dragons
July 20	"Blurred Lines"	Robin Thicke feat. T.I & Pharrell Williams
July 27	"Blurred Lines"	Robin Thicke feat. T.I & Pharrell Williams
August 3	"Blurred Lines"	Robin Thicke feat. T.I & Pharrell Williams
August 10	"Blurred Lines"	Robin Thicke feat. T.I & Pharrell Williams
August 17	"Love Somebody"	Maroon 5
August 24	"Clarity"	Zedd feat. Foxes
August 31	"Treasure"	Bruno Mars
September 7	"Clarity"	Zedd feat. Foxes
September 14	"Safe and Sound"	Capital Cities
September 21	"Safe and Sound"	Capital Cities
September 28	"Roar"	Katy Perry
October 5	"Roar"	Katy Perry
October 12	"Roar"	Katy Perry
October 19	"Roar"	Katy Perry
October 26	"Royals"	Lorde
November 2	"Royals"	Lorde
November 9	"Wake Me Up"	Avicii feat. Aloe Blacc
November 16	"Wake Me Up"	Avicii feat. Aloe Blacc
November 23	"Wake Me Up"	Avicii feat. Aloe Blacc
November 30	"Wrecking Ball"	Miley Cyrus
December 7	"Demons"	Imagine Dragons
December 14	"Demons"	Imagine Dragons
Video of the Year	"Blurred Lines"	Robin Thicke feat. T.I. & Pharrell Williams'

=== 2014 ===
Date	Song	Artist(s)
January 4	"Counting Stars"	OneRepublic
January 11	"The Monster"	Eminem feat. Rihanna
January 18	"The Monster"	Eminem feat. Rihanna
January 25	"Timber"	Pitbull feat. Kesha
February 1	"Timber"	Pitbull feat. Kesha
February 8	"Timber"	Pitbull feat. Kesha
February 15	"Timber"	Pitbull feat. Kesha
February 22	"Say Something"	A Great Big World feat. Christina Aguilera
March 1	"Say Something"	A Great Big World feat. Christina Aguilera
March 8	"Team"	Lorde
March 15	"Best Day of My Life"	American Authors
March 22	"Story of My Life"	One Direction
March 29	"Team"	Lorde
April 5	"Happy"	Pharrell Williams
April 12	"Happy"	Pharrell Williams
April 19	"Happy"	Pharrell Williams
April 26	"Talk Dirty"	Jason Derulo
May 3	"All of Me"	John Legend
May 10	"All of Me"	John Legend
May 17	"All of Me"	John Legend
May 24	"Ain't it Fun"	Paramore
May 31	"Ain't it Fun"	Paramore
June 7	"Ain't it Fun"	Paramore
June 14	"Summer"	Calvin Harris
June 21	"Fancy"	Iggy Azalea feat. Charli XCX
June 28	"Fancy"	Iggy Azalea feat. Charli XCX
July 5	"Am I Wrong"	Nico & Vinz
July 12	"Am I Wrong"	Nico & Vinz
July 19	"Stay with Me"	Sam Smith
July 26	"Am I Wrong"	Nico & Vinz
August 2	"Rude"	MAGIC!
August 9	"Rude"	MAGIC!
August 16	"Stay with Me"	Sam Smith
August 23	"Latch"	Disclosure feat. Sam Smith
August 30	"Stay with Me"	Sam Smith
September 6	"Boom Clap"	Charli XCX
September 13	"Maps"	Maroon 5
September 20	"Boom Clap"	Charli XCX
September 27	"All About That Bass"	Meghan Trainor
October 4	"All About That Bass"	Meghan Trainor
October 11	"Shake It Off"	Taylor Swift
October 18	"All About That Bass"	Meghan Trainor
October 25	"Shake It Off"	Taylor Swift
November 1	"Black Widow"	Iggy Azalea feat. Rita Ora
November 8	"Chasing Pavements" (VH1 Unplugged version)	Adele (You Oughta Know Artist special)
November 15	"Habits"	Tove Lo
November 22	"Habits"	Tove Lo
November 29	"Animals"	Maroon 5
December 6	"Don't"	Ed Sheeran
December 13	"Don't"	Ed Sheeran
Video of the Year	"All of Me"	John Legend

=== 2015 ===
Date	Song	Artist(s)
January 10	"Blank Space"	Taylor Swift
January 17	"Jealous"	Nick Jonas
January 24	"Blank Space"	Taylor Swift
January 31	"Uptown Funk"	Mark Ronson feat. Bruno Mars
February 7	"Uptown Funk"	Mark Ronson feat. Bruno Mars
February 14	"Thinking Out Loud"	Ed Sheeran
February 21	"Take Me to Church"	Hozier
February 28	"Thinking Out Loud"	Ed Sheeran
March 7	"Uptown Funk"	Mark Ronson feat. Bruno Mars
March 14	"Time of Our Lives"	Pitbull and Ne-Yo
March 21	"Style	Taylor Swift
March 28	"Style	Taylor Swift
April 4	"Sugar"	Maroon 5
April 11	"Love Me Like You Do"	Ellie Goulding
April 18	"Love Me Like You Do"	Ellie Goulding
April 25	"Love Me Like You Do"	Ellie Goulding
May 2	"Love Me Like You Do"	Ellie Goulding
May 9	"Love Me Like You Do"	Ellie Goulding
May 16	"Want to Want Me"	Jason Derulo
May 23	"See You Again"	Wiz Khalifa feat. Charlie Puth
May 30	"See You Again"	Wiz Khalifa feat. Charlie Puth
June 6	"See You Again"	Wiz Khalifa feat. Charlie Puth
June 13	"Want to Want Me"	Jason Derulo
June 20	"20th Anniversary" special	—N/a
June 27	"Want to Want Me"	Jason Derulo
July 4	"Bad Blood"	Taylor Swift feat. Kendrick Lamar
July 11	"Bad Blood"	Taylor Swift feat. Kendrick Lamar
July 18	"Bad Blood"	Taylor Swift feat. Kendrick Lamar
July 25	"Hey Mama"	David Guetta feat. Nicki Minaj, Bebe Rexha & Afrojack
August 1	"Cheerleader"	OMI
August 8	"Cheerleader"	OMI
August 15	"Cheerleader"	OMI
August 22	"Cheerleader"	OMI
August 29	VMA special	—N/a
September 5	VMA special	—N/a
September 12	"Lean On"	Major Lazer and DJ Snake feat. MØ
September 19	"Good for You"	Selena Gomez
September 26	"Good for You"	Selena Gomez
October 3	"Cool for the Summer"	Demi Lovato
October 10	"Locked Away"	"R. City feat. Adam Levine"
October 17	"Locked Away"	"R. City feat. Adam Levine"
October 24	"The Hills"	The Weeknd
October 31	Halloween special	"Ghostbusters"; Ray Parker Jr.
November 7	You Oughta Know Artist special	"Writing's on the Wall"; Sam Smith
November 14	"Stitches"	Shawn Mendes
November 21	"Stitches"	Shawn Mendes
November 28	"Hotline Bling"	Drake

- Note: No song of the year was named in 2015 due to the show's abrupt cancellation.

== List of hosts ==
Since the show's first introduction in 1994, it has featured a number of hosts:

- A.J. Hammer (1995–98)
- Cynthia Garrett (1997)
- Madison Michelle (1998–2000)
- Cane (2000–01)
- Rachel Perry (2002–06; August 26, 2006 (voiceover only); October 21, 2006 (hosted in person/on camera)
- Abby Gennet (2003)
- Bradford How (2004–06)
- Matt Pinfield (April 7-September 30, 2006)
- Aamer Haleem (2001-2006; May 26, 2006; October 7, 2006–August 2007)
- Alison Becker (August 2007–January 2009)
- Jim Shearer (January 2009–14)
- Shannon Coffey (2015)

== Records ==
- Artist with most weeks at #1 – Daughtry (39 weeks)
- Video with most weeks at #1 – "Smooth" - Santana featuring Rob Thomas and "Not Ready to Make Nice" – The Dixie Chicks (14 weeks)
- Most consecutive #1 video – "Not Ready to Make Nice" – The Dixie Chicks (13 weeks)
- Artist with most songs in the 20x20 Club – Lifehouse ("You and Me", "Whatever It Takes", "Hanging By A Moment" and "Halfway Gone")
- Song with the most weeks in the countdown – "Iris" – Goo Goo Dolls (35 weeks)
- Longest number of weeks to reach #1 – "Ho Hey" – The Lumineers (25 weeks)

== Artists with the most #1 videos ==
Artist	#1s
Taylor Swift	11
Maroon 5	10
Nickelback	10
Katy Perry	10
Kelly Clarkson	9
P!nk	9
Daughtry	8
Lady Gaga	7
Bruno Mars	7
Usher	7
Beyonce	6
Mariah Carey	6
Rihanna	6
3 Doors Down	5
Alicia Keys	5
Train	5
Adele	4
Celine Dion	4
Creed	4
Janet Jackson	4
Jewel	4
Jennifer Lopez	4
Matchbox 20	4
No Doubt	4
OneRepublic	4
Jordin Sparks	4
Demi Lovato	4
Bon Jovi	3
David Cook	3
Savage Garden	3
Sheryl Crow	3
Miley Cyrus	3
Eminem	3
fun.	3
David Guetta	3
The Black Eyed Peas	3
Lifehouse	3
Jason Mraz	3
OutKast	3
Pussycat Dolls	3
The Script	3
Britney Spears	3
Ed Sheeran	3
Rob Thomas	3
Iggy Azalea	2
Jason Derulo	2
Dixie Chicks	2
Ellie Goulding	2
Lorde	2
Imagine Dragons	2
Pitbull	2
Santana	2
Leona Lewis	2

== See also ==
- VH1
- Total Request Live
- MTV
