= Gonna Meet a Rockstar =

Gonna Meet A Rockstar was a 30-minute program on Canada's Much Music that gave fans of an artist or band a chance to spend the day with their idol. Rachel Perry, Namugenyi Kiwanuka and Bradford How were the hosts of many of the episodes. The lucky winner would have a Much Music VJ arrive at their door to surprise them with the news.

The Episodes Featured:

- Green Day - Filmed at the 2000 Vans Warped Tour at Molson Park in Barrie, Ontario.
- Barenaked Ladies - A winner spent the day playing mini-golf and arcade games with the band.
- Linkin Park - Filmed in New York City where they spent the day bowling and then played a live show in front of thousands.
- Papa Roach - Filmed at the Warehouse concert venue in Toronto, Ontario.
- Our Lady Peace - Filmed at Summersault in 2000 at Commonwealth Stadium in Edmonton, Alberta.
- Matthew Good Band - Filmed in the band's home town of Vancouver, British Columbia at a recording studio owned by Bryan Adams.
- Avril Lavigne - Filmed in Toronto, Ontario. They played arcade games and had pizza together with other band members.
- Everclear - Filmed in Salem, Massachusetts. They spend the day touring the famous witch museums.
- S Club 7 - A winner from Hamilton, Ontario goes to Los Angeles to meet S Club 7.
- Bif Naked - A winner goes shopping with Bif in Vancouver, British Columbia.
- Blink 182 - Winner Janel, from Newfoundland goes to Las Vegas to meet and greet with the band.
