= Big Morning Buzz Live =

- Genre: Morning news, Talk show
- Created by: Shane Farley, Lee Rolontz, Keshia Williams
- Directed by: Sarah de la O (2011–12); Keith Koslov (2012); Rik Reinholdtsen (2013)
- Starring: Jim Shearer; Carrie Keagan (2011–2013); Jason Dundas (2011–2013); Nick Lachey (2014–2015); Michelle Buteau (2014–2015)
- Country of origin: United States
- No. of seasons: 3
- No. of episodes: 427

Production
- Executive producer: Shane Farley
- Running time: 48 minutes

Original release
- Network: VH1
- Release: May 9, 2011 – June 5, 2015

Big Morning Buzz Live is a live daily morning news and pop culture talk show on VH1 that premiered on May 9, 2011, and aired its last episode on June 5, 2015. Broadcast weekday mornings and hosted by Nick Lachey, the show featured entertainment news, celebrity interviews and musical performances. The series was originally hosted by Carrie Keagan, who departed the series in 2013. Lachey took over for Keagan in March 2014.

== Overview ==
Big Morning Buzz Live is a one-hour morning news and talk show that features film and TV celebrity interviews as well as live music performances from current music acts. The third season premiered at 10:00 a.m. on September 30, 2013. The fifth season began on September 29, 2014, at 9:00 am. EDT.

It was executive produced by Shane Farley, Lee Rolontz, and Keshia Williams, and was taped at VH1's Times Square Studios at One Astor Plaza in New York City, the former home of the MTV series Total Request Live. The trio also produced the entertainment news and gossip morning show The Gossip Table, which taped in the same studio.

On August 25, 2015, VH1 cancelled both Big Morning Buzz Live and The Gossip Table.

As of April, 2026 the game show Flip Side occupied the formers timeslot.

== Co-hosts ==
The host of Big Morning Buzz Live was Carrie Keagan, with Jason Dundas and VH1 music expert Jim Shearer In December 2013, Keagan announced her decision to depart the series. In a statement she stated, "I’ve had the most wonderful time and experience hosting Buzz, and I am very grateful to have worked with the stellar production team behind the show as well as Tom Calderone and Lee Rolontz at VH1 who were incredible champions and supporters. [...] I’m sad to leave but I am very proud to have helped launch VH1's first morning show and look forward to its continued success." Keagan taped her final show on December 20, 2013 after nearly 400 episodes. On January 16, 2014, VH1 announced that singer Nick Lachey would resume hosting the series, upon its return on March 3, 2014. In September 2014, Michelle Buteau joined the show as co-host. In March 2015, WWE's Renee Young joined the show as guest host alongside Lachey and Buteau.
