= Hanna Roundhouse =

Railway roundhouse in Alberta, Canada

Coordinates: 51.63779°N 111.93722°W

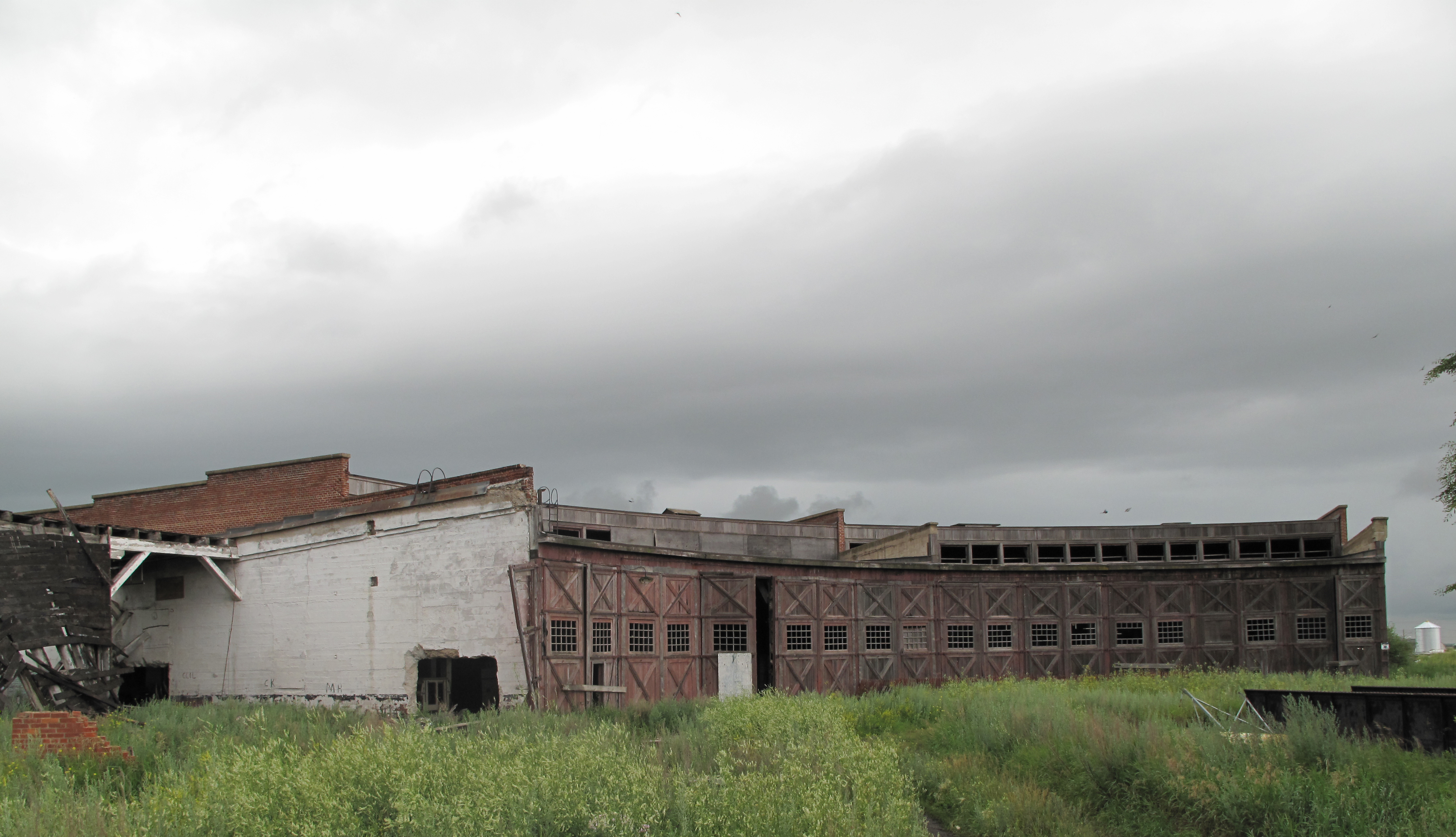
The Hanna Roundhouse in Hanna Alberta

The Hanna Roundhouse, a railway servicing and storage building, was built in 1913 along the Canadian National Railway in the town of Hanna, Alberta.

== History ==
Originally built with ten stalls, five more were added by 1921. It is constructed primarily with poured concrete, and later additions were added in brick. It was closed in 1961 due to its inability to house the new larger diesel locomotives.

After its closure, it was used by a farm manufacturing firm, and then a cattle auction market. The Hanna Roundhouse appears in the Nickelback's "Photograph" music video.

== Restoration ==
The Roundhouse Restoration Project is an effort to restore and reuse the historic Roundhouse. The project has submitted a nomination for the Heritage Canada Foundation Top Ten Endangered Places List, as well as to Aviva Community Fund.
