= Jim Shearer =

American VJ

Jim Shearer is a VJ and was host of the VH1 Top 20 Video Countdown and was the "music expert" on VH1's morning show Big Morning Buzz Live. Currently, Shearer is a host on Sirius XM's VOLUME channel.

== Biography ==
Shearer was hired by MTV in 2002 after catching the eye of the executive vice president of MTV with a homemade audition tape.

From 2009 to 2014, Shearer was the host of the VH1 Top 20 Video Countdown. He has also hosted the shows Advance Warning, 120 Minutes, Subterranean, Video Mods, Summer Gig, as well as other shows on both MTV and MTV2. In addition, Shearer hosted VH1's 100 Greatest Artists of All Time and VH1's 100 Greatest Videos of All Time. Shearer works for IFC on a blog called "Indie Ear", hosts the Pittsburgh Penguins blog on YouTube called Yinz Luv 'Da Guins, and a Pittsburgh Steelers blog on YouTube called Yinz Luv 'Da Stillers.! His wife, Victoria Shearer, is fluent in Spanish and is a Spanish teacher in their native Pittsburgh. He also has 2 brothers named Matt Shearer and Dan Shearer. Shearer graduated from Waynesburg College (now Waynesburg University). Shearer’s catchphrase is "I will see yinz later." Shearer's favorite music artists are The Beastie Boys, and he plays in a rock band called Deck of Jack.
