= Surgery Saved My Life =

- Genre: Documentary
- Theme music composer: Chad Kroeger; Ryan Peake; Mike Kroeger; Daniel Adair
- Opening theme: "Savin' Me" by Nickelback
- Country of origin: United States
- Original language: English
- No. of seasons: 1
- No. of episodes: 20

Production
- Running time: 60 minutes (per episode)

Original release
- Network: Discovery Channel
- Release: November 30, 2006 – March 13, 2008

Surgery Saved My Life is a documentary series which aired for two years on Discovery Channel. It is a medical show that features people with life-threatening health problems. The cameras follow the patients as they undergo surgery and the doctors as they prepare for and follow through on the life-saving operations.

Surgery Saved My Life was never released on video.

== Overview ==
People with life-threatening health problems undergo surgery.

== Cast ==
The show was narrated by Ed Cunningham. Each episode consisted of different patients and doctors.
