= All the Right Reasons =

Studio album by Nickelback
- Released: October 4, 2005
- Studios: Mountainview (Abbotsford, British Columbia)
- Genres: Post-grunge; hard rock
- Length: 41:38
- Labels: Roadrunner; EMI (Canada)
- Producers: Nickelback; Joey Moi

Nickelback chronology
The Long Road (2003)	All the Right Reasons (2005)	Dark Horse (2008)

Singles from All the Right Reasons
- 1. "Photograph" Released: August 8, 2005; 2. "Animals" Released: November 21, 2005; 3. "Far Away" Released: January 23, 2006; 4. "Savin' Me" Released: February 27, 2006; 5. "Rockstar" Released: August 14, 2006; 6. "If Everyone Cared" Released: November 13, 2006; 7. "Side of a Bullet" Released: March 3, 2007

All the Right Reasons is the fifth studio album by Canadian rock band Nickelback, released on October 4, 2005, on Roadrunner Records. It is the band's first album with former 3 Doors Down drummer Daniel Adair, who replaced Ryan Vikedal in January 2005. The album topped the Canadian Albums Chart and the US Billboard 200 albums chart. It is Nickelback's best-selling album to date, according to certifications from the MC, the RIAA, the BPI, and the ARIA. Seven singles were released from the album. The album re-entered the Finland Albums Chart in 2010, setting a new peak position at number 21.

All the Right Reasons was certified diamond by the RIAA in March 2017 and had sold 7.96 million copies in the US as of December 2015, making it one of the best-selling albums of all time in the US. In Canada, All the Right Reasons was certified 7× Platinum by the CRIA in March 2010. Worldwide, the album has sold 11 million copies, making it one of the best-selling albums of the 21st century.

In 2020 it was reissued as an expanded edition for its 15th anniversary featuring the original album being remastered by Ted Jensen and contains extra songs along with a second disc with previously unreleased audio of their 2006 South Dakota concert.

== Music and lyrics ==
The album's style has been characterized as "straight-up heavy rock", taking stylistic cues from the "angst of grunge". The album's lyrics explore sexual themes. The lyrics to the album's closing track, "Rockstar", have been described as "sarcastic".

== Reception and legacy ==
Professional ratings
Aggregate scores
Source	Rating
Metacritic	41/100
Review scores
Source	Rating
AllMusic	2/5 stars
Billboard	4/5 stars
E! Online	C−
The Encyclopedia of Popular Music	3/5 stars
Entertainment Weekly	B
Jam!	2.5/5 stars
Mojo	2/5 stars
The New York Times	0.5/5 stars
Q	2/5 stars
Rolling Stone	2/5 stars

The album received mixed to negative reviews, currently holding a score of 41 based on nine critics on Metacritic. However, Entertainment Weekly explained the album's success this way: "What if Nickelback's decision to let the music speak for itself is, ironically, their biggest selling point of all?" Kelefa Sanneh of The New York Times criticized the lyrical content of the album, referring to it as "another brash but sullen CD with more of the worst rock lyrics ever recorded."

Stephen Thomas Erlewine of AllMusic gave the album two stars out of five, noting that although he found the music to be more diverse than that of Nickelback's previous offerings, he ultimately found the album to be one-dimensional and repetitive. He wrote: "Sure, they stretch a little bit, but they still favor clumsy, plodding riffs, still incessantly rewrite the same chords and melody, still harmonize exactly the same way on every song, Kroeger still sounds as if he's singing with a hernia, [and] he still writes shockingly stupid lines that make you long for the days of such subtle double-entendres. [...] despite all their newly developed relative nuances, Nickelback remain unchanged: they're still unspeakably awful."

In 2014, Tom Hawking of Flavorwire included the album in his list of "The 50 Worst Albums Ever Made", in which he said: "You didn’t honestly think we were gonna forget Nickelback, did you?" By contrast, in 2025 Lauryn Schaffner of Loudwire named the album the best post-grunge release of 2005, saying: "All The Right Reasons features not only some of their biggest songs ever, but several that turned into memes — a perfect display of significant cultural relevance that have stood the test of time. [...] Nickelback certainly didn't invent post-grunge, but they brought it to the masses in a bigger way than any band had before." That same year, she said it was the band's best album: "Everyone knows these songs, whether they first heard of them on the radio or a meme. All the Right Reasons was the moment Nickelback perfected their sound and their formula and they wouldn't be as successful as they are without it."

== Commercial performance ==
The album was the third straight No. 1 album for the band in their native Canada. It sold more than 60,000 copies in its first week, topping their previous number 1 albums Silver Side Up and The Long Road (selling 43,000 and 45,000 copies). The album debuted at number one on the US Billboard 200 chart, selling 323,350 copies in its first week in the United States. In the United States, the album to date has sold over 8 million copies and was found again inside the top 10 of the Billboard 200 in its 99th, 100th, 101st, and 102nd weeks on the chart. The album had never been below number 30 on the Billboard 200 in 110 weeks, making Nickelback the first act to have an album in the top 30 of the Billboard 200 for its first 100 weeks since Shania Twain's 1997 album Come On Over stayed in the top thirty for 123 consecutive weeks following its release.

In addition, the album has spawned five top-20 Hot 100 singles in the U.S.: "Photograph", "Savin' Me", "Far Away", "If Everyone Cared", and "Rockstar", making it one of only a handful of rock albums to ever produce five or more top-twenty U.S. hits. "Photograph", "Far Away", and "Rockstar" were all top ten singles on the Hot 100, making Nickelback the first rock band of the 2000s (decade) to have three top-ten hits from the same album.

In the UK, the album opened its chart run at number 13 before quickly leaving the top 75 with no top 20 singles, with "Savin' Me" being their first to miss the top 75 altogether. While being the band's smallest-selling UK album since Curb, it experienced, in early 2008, a resurrection due to the single "Rockstar" becoming Nickelback's highest-charting single ever in the UK. The album has now outpeaked its previous peak of number 13, reaching number 2 and has since been certified Platinum.

It was ranked number 13 on Billboard's 200 Albums of the Decade.

== Track listing ==
Standard edition

All lyrics are written by Chad Kroeger; all music is composed by Nickelback.

No.	Title	Length
1.	"Follow You Home"	4:20
2.	"Fight for All the Wrong Reasons"	3:44
3.	"Photograph"	4:18
4.	"Animals"	3:06
5.	"Savin' Me"	3:39
6.	"Far Away"	3:58
7.	"Next Contestant"	3:34
8.	"Side of a Bullet"	3:00
9.	"If Everyone Cared"	3:38
10.	"Someone That You're With"	4:01
11.	"Rockstar"	4:15
Total length:		41:38

Australian edition
No.	Title	Length
12.	"Someday" (live acoustic version)	3:25

Japanese edition
No.	Title	Length
12.	"We Will Rock You" (Queen cover)	2:00
13.	"Someday" (live – acoustic)	4:39

Special edition

All the Right Reasons: Special edition was released on July 10, 2007. It is a two-disc set and includes a Nickelback wallpaper, as well as three live tracks and a remixed version of "Photograph" as bonus tracks. The bonus DVD includes four videos, a behind-the-scenes tour diary, and interviews.

Special edition

12. "Photograph" (live)
13. "Animals" (live)
14. "Follow You Home" (live)

Wal-Mart exclusive special edition

15. "Never Again" (live)

Special edition DVD

1. "Photograph" (music video)
2. "Savin' Me" (music video)
3. "Far Away" (music video)
4. "If Everyone Cared" (music video)
5. Behind-the-scenes tour diary
6. Interviews

15th anniversary edition (2020)

12. "We Will Rock You" (Queen cover – B-side of "Photograph")
13. "Photograph" (acoustic – B-side of "Far Away")
14. "Too Bad" (acoustic – B-side of "If Everyone Cared")
15. "Someday" (live acoustic – B-side of "If Everyone Cared")

Disc 2 (Live at Buffalo Chip, Sturgis, South Dakota, August 8, 2006)

1. "Intro/Animals"
2. "Woke Up This Morning"
3. "Photograph" (later released as a B-side to "I'd Come for You" in Japan)
4. "Because of You"
5. "Far Away" (later released as a B-side to "I'd Come for You" in Europe)
6. "Never Again"
7. "Savin' Me"
8. "Someday"
9. "Side of a Bullet"
10. "How You Remind Me"
11. "Too Bad"
12. "Figured You Out"

== Personnel ==
Nickelback

- Chad Kroeger – lead vocals, lead guitar
- Ryan Peake – rhythm guitar, backing vocals
- Mike Kroeger – bass
- Daniel Adair – drums, backing vocals

Musicians

- Timmy Dawson – piano on "Savin' Me" and "If Everyone Cared", acoustic guitar (15th Anniversary Disc 2) on "Savin' Me" and "Someday"
- Dimebag Darrell – guitar solo (sample) on "Side of a Bullet"
- Chris Gestrin – organ on "Rockstar"
- Billy Gibbons – guitar and backing vocals on "Follow You Home", "Fight for All the Wrong Reasons" and "Rockstar"
- Brian Larson – synthesizer strings on "Far Away"

Technical

- Ryan Andersen – digital editing
- Richard Beland – photography
- Zach Blackstone – mixing assistance
- Kevin Estrada – photography
- Ted Jensen – mastering
- Joey Moi – production, engineering, digital editing
- Mike Shipley – mixing on "Photograph" and "Far Away"
- Randy Staub – mixing
- Brian Wohlgemuth – mixing assistance on "Photograph" and "Far Away"

== Charts ==
=== Weekly charts ===
Chart (2005–2010)	Peak position
Australian Albums (ARIA)	2
Austrian Albums (Ö3 Austria)	7
Belgian Albums (Ultratop Flanders)	35
Belgian Albums (Ultratop Wallonia)	88
Canadian Albums (Billboard)	1
Canadian Hard Rock Albums (Nielsen SoundScan)	1
Danish Albums (Hitlisten)	32
Dutch Albums (Album Top 100)	20
Finnish Albums (Suomen virallinen lista)	21
French Albums (SNEP)	67
German Albums (Offizielle Top 100)	4
Hungarian Albums (MAHASZ)	38
Irish Albums (IRMA)	4
Japanese Albums (Oricon)	26
New Zealand Albums (RMNZ)	1
Scottish Albums (Official Charts)	1
Swedish Albums (Sverigetopplistan)	22
Swiss Albums (Schweizer Hitparade)	4
UK Albums (Official Charts)	2
UK Rock & Metal Albums (Official Charts)	1
US Billboard 200	1
US Digital Albums (Billboard)	15
US Top Alternative Albums (Billboard)	1
US Top Catalog Albums (Billboard)	4
US Top Hard Rock Albums (Billboard)	1
US Top Rock Albums (Billboard)	1

=== Year-end charts ===
Chart (2005)	Position
Australian Albums (ARIA)	34
German Albums (Offizielle Top 100)	84
New Zealand Albums (RMNZ)	28
Swiss Albums (Schweizer Hitparade)	48
US Billboard 200	63
Worldwide Albums (IFPI)	24

Chart (2006)	Position
Australian Albums (ARIA)	11
German Albums (Offizielle Top 100)	81
New Zealand Albums (RMNZ)	4
Swiss Albums (Schweizer Hitparade)	79
US Billboard 200	3
US Top Rock Albums (Billboard)	1

Chart (2007)	Position
Australian Albums (ARIA)	86
US Billboard 200	6
US Top Rock Albums (Billboard)	2

Chart (2008)	Position
UK Albums (OCC)	11
US Billboard 200	48
US Top Rock Albums (Billboard)	14

=== Decade-end charts ===
Chart (2000–2009)	Position
Australian Albums (ARIA)	47
US Billboard 200	13

== Certifications ==
Region	Certification	Certified units/sales
Australia (ARIA)	4× Platinum	280,000^{^}
Austria (IFPI Austria)	Gold	15,000^{*}
Canada (Music Canada)	7× Platinum	700,000^{^}
Germany (BVMI)	2× Platinum	400,000^{‡}
Netherlands (NVPI)	Gold	40,000^{^}
New Zealand (RMNZ)	4× Platinum	60,000^{‡}
Switzerland (IFPI Switzerland)	Gold	20,000^{^}
United Kingdom (BPI)	3× Platinum	900,000^{‡}
United States (RIAA)	Diamond	7,960,000
Summaries
Worldwide	—	11,000,000
^{*} Sales figures based on certification alone.^{^} Shipments figures based on certification alone.^{‡} Sales+streaming figures based on certification alone.
