= Rockstar (Nickelback song) =

2006 single by Nickelback

Single by Nickelback

from the album All the Right Reasons
- B-side: "Leader of Men"
- Released: August 14, 2006
- Studio: Mountain View (Abbotsford, British Columbia, Canada)
- Genre: Country rock; pop rock
- Length: 4:15
- Label: Roadrunner
- Songwriter: Nickelback
- Producers: Nickelback; Joey Moi

Nickelback singles chronology
"Savin' Me" (2006)	"Rockstar" (2006)	"If Everyone Cared" (2006)

Music video
- "Rockstar" on YouTube

"Rockstar" a song by Canadian rock band Nickelback, released as the fifth single from their fifth studio album, All the Right Reasons (2005). The ballad was initially only released in the United States and Canada, but has since been re-released worldwide. The lyrics feature the hopes of someone who desires to be a rockstar and satirises the excesses of celebrity culture. Spoken-word vocals between each verse are provided by Billy Gibbons of ZZ Top.

"Rockstar" is one of Nickelback's most popular singles to date, peaking at number two in the United Kingdom (their highest-charting single in that country) and being certified Platinum. It has also sold 4.5 million digital copies in the United States and certified 12× Platinum.

== Composition ==
"Rockstar" is a "spoof-filled" country rock and pop rock ballad. According to the sheet music published at Musicnotes.com by Alfred Publishing, the song is written in the key of G major and is set in time signature of common time with a tempo of 76 beats per minute.

=== Lawsuits ===
In May 2020, Kirk Johnston, the guitarist for Texas rock band Snowblind Revival, sued Nickelback over the song's composition, which he believes is too similar to the Snowblind Revival song "Rock Star". In August 2021, Johnston filed a lawsuit against Nickelback, Warner/Chappell Music, Roadrunner Records, and Live Nation for copyright infringement. On March 16, 2023, judge Robert L. Pitman dismissed the case with prejudice.

== Reception ==
Rolling Stone ranked "Rockstar" at number 100 in their list of the 100 best songs of 2007. Aside from its praise from Rolling Stone and popularity, some have labelled it one of the worst songs of all time. "Rockstar" was listed at number two in BuzzFeed's list of the 30 worst songs ever written The Guardian's Peter Robinson claimed that the song was "...a Smack the Pony skit without the laughter track; ironic, given that 'Rockstar' is one of the most unintentionally hilarious songs of the last few years. It is also one of most confusing".

== Chart performance ==
=== United States ===
Upon the song's original release, "Far Away" was more successful on the Billboard Hot 100 and US pop charts, while "Rockstar" saw moderate success on the rock charts. It peaked at No. 4 on the Mainstream Rock Tracks chart, and No. 37 on the Modern Rock Tracks chart. It entered the Billboard Hot 100, peaking at number No. 54, during its original run.

The song was re-shipped to radio for ads on June 5, 2007, and a video was made to accompany the re-release. After its re-release, it became active on most charts again, reaching new peaks on numerous charts like the Hot 100, the Adult Top 40, and Pop 100. It re-entered the Billboard Hot 100 at No. 47 on week ending date July 7, 2007. It also registered on charts it had previously failed to do on first release, such as the Pop 100 Airplay. On September 12, 2007, the song reached a new peak of number six on the Billboard Hot 100, faring better than "Far Away". It became Nickelback's third top 10 hit from All the Right Reasons, and their fifth career top 10 on the Hot 100 overall.

"Rockstar" reached its 3,000,000 downloads mark in the US in May 2009 and became the best-selling rock single of the 21st century before "How You Remind Me". It reached four million in sales in the US in June 2012, making it the band's best-selling hit in that country. As of January 2015, the song has sold 4.5 million copies in the US. In 2026, it would be certified 12× Platinum by RIAA.

=== United Kingdom ===
"Rockstar" was a major success in the United Kingdom, where it peaked at number two on the UK Singles Chart and number one on the UK Singles Downloads Chart, becoming the most successful single overall of Nickelback's career in Britain. The song was released in physical form there after becoming popular online and climbing into the top 50 on downloads alone. Over two years after the release of All the Right Reasons, it became the band's biggest hit in the country, selling 587,000 copies. It debuted on the UK Singles Chart on October 21, 2007―week ending October 27, 2007―and lasted almost nine months on the chart.

On August 10, 2008―week ending August 16, 2008―the song re-entered the chart. The release of "Rockstar" also helped All the Right Reasons achieve a top 10 position in the UK Albums Chart for the first time, becoming their third top-10 album there. It also pushed sales of the album there from under 200,000 to over half a million. It became the UK's fifth biggest-selling single of 2008. In August 2008, the song re-entered the top 40 of the UK Singles Chart at No. 27, and stayed for an extra four weeks, taking its total of weeks in the top 40 to 35. The song remained on the chart for 50 consecutive weeks before falling off in October 2008.

== Music video ==
When the song was first released in August 2006, no music video was made for the single. Dori Oskowitz, who directed the band's "If Everyone Cared" video, returned to direct the music video for the song's re-release.

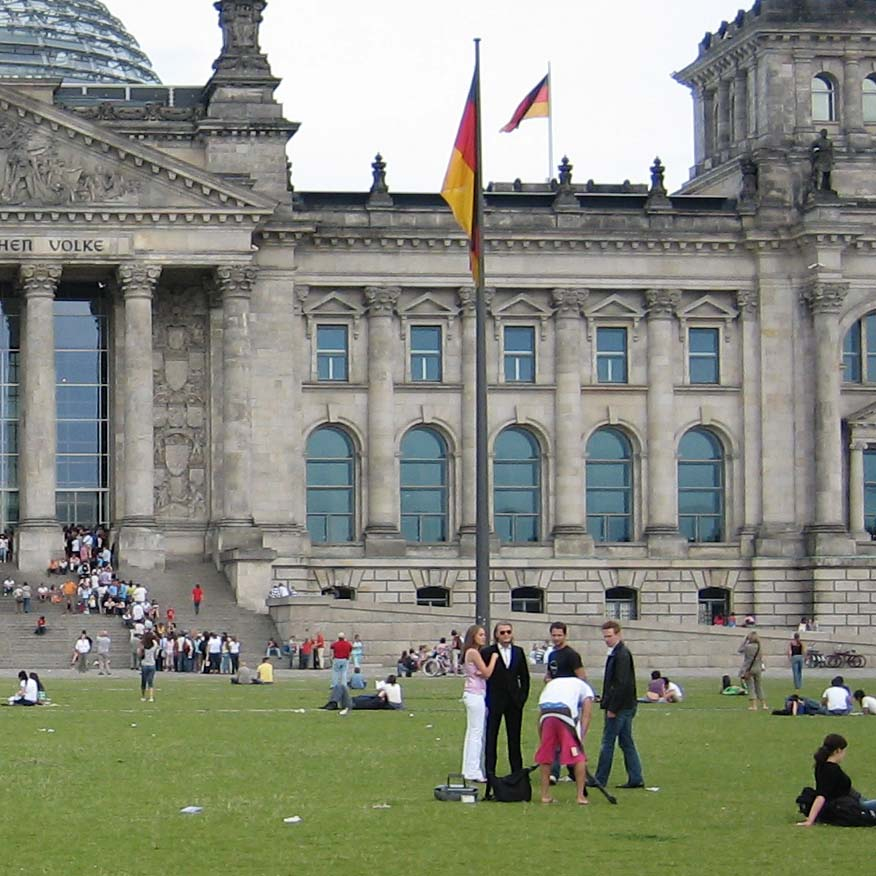
Filming outside the Reichstag in Berlin in 2007

The video features celebrities and anonymous people lip syncing to the lyrics. The non-celebrities are filmed around the world, in front of iconic landmarks, such as Times Square, the Flatiron Building and Grand Central Station in New York City, Millennium Park and the Buckingham Fountain in Chicago, Playboy Mansion in Los Angeles, St Paul's Cathedral and Tower Bridge in London, the Opera House and Harbour Bridge in Sydney, and the Brandenburger Tor, Checkpoint Charlie and Reichstag in Berlin.

On-screen celebrities include ZZ Top frontman Billy Gibbons (who voices his lines in the song), UFC fighter Chuck "The Iceman" Liddell, NASCAR driver Dale Earnhardt Jr., actresses Eliza Dushku and Dominique Swain, KISS bassist Gene Simmons, ice hockey legend Wayne Gretzky, country music duo Big & Rich's John Rich, Playboy models Tenelle Ward, Kendra Wilkinson, Holly Madison, and Bridget Marquardt from The Girls Next Door, actor Tom Petkos, musician Kid Rock, actress Stacey Travis, rappers Lupe Fiasco and Twista, singer Nelly Furtado, and Tenelle Ward as the iconic Playboy Bunny with Susan Lynn, and her son Bradley Ward family friends Biggy Norris and from Newcastle Australia, the crew from motorcycle-themed reality show American Chopper, rapper/DJ Paul Wall, musician Ted Nugent, basketball player Grant Hill, actresses Taryn Manning and Riki Lindhome, actor Federico Castelluccio, filmmaker/musician Liam Lynch, comedian Jordan Carlos, the Naked Cowboy, hip-hop group Three 6 Mafia, cyclist Brian Walton, and numerous others. Sometimes, the lyrics they are lip syncing relate to themselves. At the end of the video, Nickelback is shown playing live on stage; this shot was filmed on July 13, 2007, at the Comcast Center for the Performing Arts in Mansfield, Massachusetts.

== Track listings and formats ==
- AUS maxi CD single
1. "Rockstar" (radio edit) – 4:15
2. "Never Again" (live in Atlanta) – 4:16
3. "Leader of Men" – 3:29
- EU maxi CD single
1. "Rockstar" (radio edit) – 4:15
2. "Never Again" (live in Atlanta) – 4:16
3. "Photograph" (live in Atlanta) – 4:38

== Personnel ==
- Chad Kroeger – vocals, guitars, producer
- Mike Kroeger – bass, producer
- Ryan Peake – guitar, vocals, producer
- Daniel Adair – drums, vocals, producer
- Billy Gibbons – spoken word vocals
- Joey Moi – producer
- Randy Staub – mixing

Notable actors

- Tenelle Ward – brown haired twin with Susan Lynn
- James Redin – dinner table "Rockstar" scene
- Trey Goldwin – dark hair (Sydney Harbour Bridge)
- Bradley Ward – bleached blonde hair (Sydney Harbour Bridge)
- Sophie Quill – movie star featuring dark brown hair

Credits and personnel adapted from "Rockstar" CD single liner notes.

== Charts ==
=== Weekly charts ===
Chart (2006–2008)	Peak position
Australian Physical Singles (ARIA)	60
Austria (Ö3 Austria Top 40)	5
Belgium (Ultratip Bubbling Under Flanders)	23
Canada Hot 100 (Billboard)	39
Canada CHR/Top 40 (Billboard)	14
Canada Hot AC (Billboard)	14
Canada Rock (Billboard)	9
Czech Republic Airplay (ČNS IFPI)	17
Denmark (Tracklisten)	32
Europe (Eurochart Hot 100)	7
Germany (GfK)	23
Germany (Airplay Chart)	1
Hungary (Rádiós Top 40)	5
Ireland (IRMA)	2
Netherlands (Dutch Top 40)	25
Netherlands (Single Top 100)	14
Romania (Romanian Top 100)	94
Slovakia Airplay (ČNS IFPI)	28
Sweden (Sverigetopplistan)	10
Switzerland (Schweizer Hitparade)	14
UK Singles (Official Charts)	2
UK Singles Downloads (Official Charts)	1
UK Rock & Metal (Official Charts)	1
US Billboard Hot 100	6
US Adult Pop Airplay (Billboard)	6
US Alternative Airplay (Billboard)	37
US Mainstream Rock Airplay (Billboard)	4
US Pop Airplay (Billboard)	6

Chart (2021)	Peak position
US Hot Rock & Alternative Songs (Billboard)	24

=== Year-end charts ===
Chart (2007)	Position
Austria (Ö3 Austria Top 40)	49
Germany (Official German Charts)	77
Switzerland (Schweizer Hitparade)	81
UK Singles (OCC)	128
US Billboard Hot 100	36
US Adult Top 40 (Billboard)	14

Chart (2008)	Position
Europe (Eurochart Hot 100)	22
Hungary (Rádiós Top 40)	19
Netherlands (Single Top 100)	91
Sweden (Sverigetopplistan)	25
Switzerland (Schweizer Hitparade)	88
UK Singles (OCC)	5

=== Decade-end charts ===
Chart (2000–2009)	Position
UK Top 100 Songs of the Decade	54

== Certifications and sales ==
Region	Certification	Certified units/sales
Denmark (IFPI Danmark)	Gold	4,000^{^}
Germany (BVMI)	Platinum	300,000^{‡}
New Zealand (RMNZ)	3× Platinum	90,000^{‡}
United Kingdom (BPI)	3× Platinum	1,800,000^{‡}
United States (RIAA)	12× Platinum	4,500,000
^{^} Shipments figures based on certification alone.^{‡} Sales+streaming figures based on certification alone.

== Release history ==
Region	Version	Release date	Ref.
United States	Original	August 14, 2006	
United States	Re-release	June 6, 2007	
United Kingdom	Re-release	November 2007	

== Sea shanty version ==
As part of the January 2021 surge in popularity of the sea shanty form, the British indie group The Lottery Winners produced a sea shanty version of "Rockstar" via the TikTok app. Nickelback subsequently collaborated with The Lottery Winners to release a full-length shanty version. The sea shanty version of "Rockstar" changes some of the lyrics to match more of a pirate theme (such as substituting "club" with "pub" and "drug dealer" with "rum dealer"), and parodies in part both "Wellerman" and "Drunken Sailor".
