= Rachel Perry =

Canadian television personality

- Born: January 20, 1976 (age 50); Brockville, Ontario, Canada
- Occupations: Audiobook Narrator, TV Host, Actress, Mother

Rachel Perry (born January 20, 1976) is a Canadian TV personality working in the United States. The former MuchMusic VJ is the host of All Access on VH1, and is the narrator for Web Junk 20, and the host of "The Stash" on Playboy TV.

Born in Brockville, Ontario, Perry has done numerous narrations and voiceovers for VH1 shows, specials and Viacom channels specials, including Viacom owned gay and lesbian station Logo. She was also the co-host of VH1's reality show Strip Search which lasted for one season. She was co-host of Pepsi Smash. Perry began working at VH1 in January 2001 where she hosted VH1 News, All Access and the morning video show. In June 2001, she hosted Not Much On Day, a MuchMusic marathon of music videos which featured pop stars wearing little or no clothing. Perry appeared naked throughout the marathon with various objects covering her body. Until March 2006, she was also the host of VH1's Top 20 Countdown. She sometimes co-hosted with fellow Canadians Aamer Haleem and Bradford How. She narrated the behind the scenes program for Brokeback Mountain, which is featured on the DVD for it.

== Other works ==
In the meantime, Perry is also the host of VH1 Radio Network's Weekly Rewind radio program, heard on top stations around the country and distributed by Westwood One. She had also done "content wrap" spots for The CW's "c-what's happening" commercial segments, but they have seemed to be discontinued after a number of weeks.

Perry appeared as a guest star in an episode of CSI: NY called "Heart of Glass". The episode was aired on February 14, 2007.

Perry used to be neighbors with Ed Begley, Jr. and Bill Nye, and has appeared on at least one episode of Ed Begley, Jr.'s show Living With Ed, which airs on Planet Green.

In 2004 she hosted an 90s Music Infomercial for Razor and Tie, a privately held record label in NY, called Move This.

=== Playboy Channel host ===
Perry is the host and a co-writer of the Playboy Channel's "The Stash"—a "Soup-esque" (see The Soup) style format in which she comments on video clips and photos from adult media.

=== Dirty Jobs ===
Perry appeared in Discovery Channel's Dirty Jobs on the 100th Job special, as a possible "replacement" for Mike Rowe. The segment featured her and other female guest stars attempting to clean out septic tanks, with Perry's reaction the most extreme.

=== Adam Carolla Show; controversy ===
On December 29, 2005, it was announced that Perry would be joining Adam Carolla's new radio show in January 2006.

On March 20–21, 2006, the show announced that Perry was absent to rehearse for a television pilot. (The pilot was a show called Beyond, a drama based on NASA's Jet Propulsion Laboratory.)

She was absent again beginning on March 27 when the pilot was filmed. What was initially announced as a short absence grew into several weeks, during which the show featured several guests filling her role on the show.

On May 1, Carolla announced that Perry had been let go from the show and was replaced, permanently, by Teresa Strasser on May 8, 2006.
