= Savin' Me =

2006 single by Nickelback

Single by Nickelback

from the album All the Right Reasons
- Released: February 27, 2006
- Studio: Mountainview (Abbotsford, British Columbia)
- Genre: Post-grunge
- Length: 3:39
- Label: Roadrunner
- Songwriters: Chad Kroeger; Ryan Peake; Mike Kroeger; Daniel Adair
- Producer: Joey Moi

Nickelback singles chronology
"Far Away" (2006)	"Savin' Me" (2006)	"Rockstar" (2006)

Nickelback US singles chronology
"Animals" (2005)	"Savin' Me" (2006)	"Far Away" (2006)

Music video
- "Savin' Me" on YouTube

"Savin' Me" is a song written and performed by Canadian band Nickelback. It was released as the fourth overall single from their fifth studio album, All the Right Reasons (2005). The song reached number two on the Canadian Singles Chart, became another top-10 hit for the band in New Zealand, peaking at number nine, and peaked at number 19 on the US Billboard Hot 100 chart. The music video was very well received and it is among their most well known videos. When the song returned to the band's live setlist during their Feed the Machine Tour; an edited version of the video, without the parts showing the band, was played on the big screen during the performance, being the only song with a music video during their live performances.

The verse "I'm on the ledge of the eighteenth story" is a reference to the eighteenth chapter of Dante Alighieri's poem Inferno, the first part of the Divine Comedy. The song was featured in the closing credits to the film The Condemned as well as in the commercials for the third season of Battlestar Galactica and the second season of Prison Break. It was also the title theme for the TV series Surgery Saved My Life.

== Music video ==
The music video opens with a man in a trenchcoat wandering near a street corner with a confused look on his face. He then sees another man talking on a cell phone about to get hit by a New Jersey Transit bus, and pulls him back just in the nick of time, and then walks away. The second man starts staring at other people as the song begins.

Eventually, the viewer sees that the second man sees timers with glowing numbers counting down above the heads of everyone around him. To everyone else, he appears to be crazy. He is baffled by the meaning of the timers until he sees an elderly woman being brought out on a stretcher to a waiting ambulance: when the timer above her head reaches zero, she dies. Shortly afterwards, he sees a young woman sitting down and peeling an orange. She has numbers above her head and in front of her pregnant stomach. He also sees that he cannot see the timer above his own head. He soon spots a business woman about to enter her car, and sees her timer rapidly dwindles much faster than it should, dropping from the millions to the single digits in a matter of seconds. Realizing what's about to happen, he pulls her out of the way in nick of time, just like the first man in the beginning did to him, before her car is crushed by a falling statue in a crate (which, in an example of foreshadowing, can be seen in midair about halfway through the video). The second man, talking on a cell phone, then walks away with his own reappearing glowing numbers overhead, just as the man who had saved him did, leaving the businesswoman astonished as she now sees the timers over everyone else's heads.

The band is in an apartment; Chad Kroeger and Ryan Peake are singing on camera, but no instruments are played; the other band members are seen simply staring at the camera, or into space. It was filmed over two days, in Vancouver on West Hastings and Burrard Street and directed by Nigel Dick.

The interpretation of the numbers on the timers is not exactly clear. While the old lady's timer implies they count down seconds, most middle-aged characters seem to have numbers in the tens of millions, which would mean they have a few months to live (10 million seconds is about 4 months). If their timer is in minutes, however, they would all have a few decades left (10 million minutes is about 20 years), which seems more likely. Anyway, a close look (at the 1:24 time mark for example) shows that the numbers are actually counting up, every second, with the decimals counting 1/30th of seconds. This seems to reveal the video editor used a timer feature of their editing software, counting elapsed seconds and frames - hence the viewer may not be supposed to interpret the timers at this level of precision, and simply get the impression that they are counting down.

== Charts ==
=== Weekly charts ===
Weekly chart performance for "Savin' Me"
Chart (2006–2008)	Peak position
Australia (ARIA)	18
Austria (Ö3 Austria Top 40)	43
Canada (Nielsen SoundScan)	2
Canada CHR/Pop Top 30 (Radio & Records)	3
Canada CHR/Top 40 (Billboard)	27
Canada Hot AC (Billboard)	40
Canada Rock (Billboard)	29
Germany (GfK)	72
Ireland (IRMA)	47
Netherlands (Dutch Top 40)	25
Netherlands (Single Top 100)	81
New Zealand (Recorded Music NZ)	9
Slovakia Airplay (ČNS IFPI)	25
Switzerland (Schweizer Hitparade)	82
UK Singles (Official Charts)	77
US Billboard Hot 100	19
US Adult Contemporary (Billboard)	29
US Adult Pop Airplay (Billboard)	2
US Alternative Airplay (Billboard)	29
US Pop Airplay (Billboard)	6
US Mainstream Rock Airplay (Billboard)	11

=== Year-end charts ===
Year-end chart rankings for "Savin' Me"
Chart (2006)	Position
Australia (ARIA)	99
Netherlands (Dutch Top 40)	186
US Billboard Hot 100	49
US Adult Top 40 (Billboard)	8

== Certifications ==
Certifications for "Savin' Me"
Region	Certification	Certified units/sales
New Zealand (RMNZ)	Platinum	30,000^{‡}
United Kingdom (BPI)	Silver	200,000^{‡}
United States (RIAA)	4× Platinum	4,000,000^{‡}
^{‡} Sales+streaming figures based on certification alone.

== Release history ==
Release dates and formats for "Savin' Me"
Region	Fate	Format(s)	Label(s)	Ref.
United States	February 27, 2006	Hot adult contemporary radio	Roadrunner	
United States	February 28, 2006	Contemporary hit radio	Roadrunner	
Australia	April 24, 2006	CD	Roadrunner	
United Kingdom	June 5, 2006	CD	Roadrunner	
