= Bradford How =

Canadian entertainer

Bradford How (born Bradford Michael Lorne How in Winnipeg, Manitoba) is a Canadian entertainer. A former MuchMusic VJ from 2000 to 2003, he has hosted shows including Nick at Nite's Bet The House, VH1's Top 20 Countdown in 2005, and as a regular on the TV series He's with Me from 2013 to 2016.

== Career ==
How won the 2000 MuchMusic VJ Search, and became one of the channel's most well-liked video jockeys. After stints hosting Electric Circus and Gonna Meet A Rockstar, among other shows. He left MuchMusic on October 30, 2003 to pursue other ambitions. In 2004, he applied to join VH1, and became a co-host of the channel's Top 20 countdown, alongside fellow Muchmusic VJ alum, Rachel Perry. He also co-hosted with Aamer Haleem.

He also hosted Nick at Nite's "Bet The House".

== Notes ==
- He is known to have a deep and booming voice and his height is over 6'2.
- He was raised in Winnipeg, Manitoba, getting his start in radio at CKUW-FM, the radio station at the University of Winnipeg.
- He is quoted as saying "MuchMusic will always be a unique and pivotal point in my professional career. The artists I've seen perform, the people I've met, the places I've been and the afternoons I've spent saying video names and waxing frivolous and philosophic with whoever happened to be watching. Maybe tomorrow I'm going to settle down; until tomorrow the whole world is my home. Thanks for joining me, my little video channel friends."

- In November 2006, Bradford spent several weeks in Biloxi, MS doing Hurricane Katrina relief work with Urban Life Missions Relief and an AmeriCorps*NCCC team, helping with various construction projects.
