= Side of a Bullet =

Single by Nickelback

from the album All the Right Reasons
- Released: March 2007
- Recorded: January–May 2005 (guitar solo recorded 1991–1993)
- Studio: Mountainview Studios, Abbotsford, British Columbia
- Genre: Heavy metal; alternative metal
- Length: 3:00
- Label: Roadrunner
- Songwriters: Daniel Adair; Chad Kroeger; Mike Kroeger; Dimebag Darrell
- Producer: Joey Moi

Nickelback singles chronology
| "If Everyone Cared" (2006) | "Side of a Bullet" (2007) | "Gotta Be Somebody" (2008) |

"Side of a Bullet" is a song by Canadian rock band Nickelback, released in March 2007 as the seventh and final single from their fifth studio album album, All the Right Reasons (2005). The song was released only to US rock stations, and charted on the Mainstream Rock Chart, peaking at No. 7, giving Nickelback their fourth top-ten hit on the chart from All the Right Reasons.

== Composition and lyrics ==
"Side of a Bullet" is a heavy metal and alternative metal song, that is influenced by Southern metal. According to the sheet music published at Musicnotes.com by Alfred Publishing, the song is written in the key of B major and is set in the time signature of common time with a moderate tempo of 126 beats per minute.

The guitar solo combines outtakes by Dimebag Darrell originally meant for Pantera's albums Vulgar Display of Power and Far Beyond Driven. His girlfriend, Rita Haney, and brother, Vinnie Paul, gave Nickelback permission to use the outtakes. At first Nickelback wanted to have Paul playing on the track but he declined by stating Nickelback's drummer, Daniel Adair, performed just as well as he could.

The song is a tribute to Dimebag Darrell who was shot and killed on stage while performing in Columbus, Ohio, with Damageplan. The lyrics for "Side of a Bullet" focus on the murder of Darrell, the anger at the perpetrator Nathan Gale and the aftermath thereof.

== Track listing ==
CD single
| No. | Title | Lyrics | Music | Length |
|---|---|---|---|---|
| 1. | "Side of a Bullet" | Chad Kroeger | Chad Kroeger; Ryan Peake; Mike Kroeger; Daniel Adair; Dimebag Darrell | 3:00 |

== Personnel ==
Nickelback

- Chad Kroeger – lead vocals, lead guitar
- Ryan Peake – rhythm guitar, backing vocals
- Mike Kroeger – bass, backing vocals
- Daniel Adair – drums, backing vocals

Additional personnel

- Dimebag Darrell – guitar solo (sample)

Technical

- Ryan Andersen – digital editing
- Richard Beland – photography
- Zach Blackstone – mixing assistance
- Kevin Estrada – photography
- Ted Jensen – mastering
- Joey Moi – production, engineering, digital editing
- Randy Staub – mixing

== Charts ==
| Chart (2007) | Peak position |
|---|---|
| Canada Rock (Billboard) | 28 |
| US Mainstream Rock Airplay (Billboard) | 7 |
| US Active Rock (Billboard) | 6 |
| US Heritage Rock (Billboard) | 8 |
