= Sabre Norris =

Australian surfer, skater and YouTuber (born 2005)

Personal information
- Nationality: Australian
- Born: Sabre Elle Norris; 3 January 2005 (age 21) Newcastle, Australia
- Occupations: Surfer; skater; YouTuber
- Years active: 2017–present
- Height: 5 ft 4 in (163 cm)

Sport
- Country: Australia
- Sport: Surfing, skateboarding
- Rank: 1. 8 on the World Surf League (WSL) Qualifying Series (QS) (2017)
- Coached by: Justin Norris

Achievements and titles
- Personal best: X-Games medal- silver 2018
- Updated on 25/09/2026

Sabre Elle Norris (born 3 January 2005) is an Australian surfer, skater, and YouTuber from Newcastle. She is the eldest child of Olympic swimmer Justin Norris, and his wife Brooke Norris.

== Early life ==
Sabre Elle Norris was born in Newcastle, New South Wales on 3 January 2005 to Australian Olympic butterfly and individual medley swimmer and singer, Justin Norris, and his wife Brooke Norris.

Norris was diagnosed with a Chiari malformation in 2018 which caused her to end skating professionally.

== Career ==
=== Sport ===
In 2016, at 11 years old, Norris was the second youngest surfer ever to compete in the open round of the Sydney International Women's Pro. Her 4 November 2016 interview with Karl Stefanovic on Australia's Channel Nine's The Today Show received over 2 million views, leading to an appearance on The Ellen DeGeneres Show which was viewed 40 million times.

She was the third female in history and first Australian female to land a "540".

In 2018, she won a bronze medal in skateboarding at the X Games (becoming the first woman to land a McTwist on a skateboard at an X Games), won the Bondi Bowl-A-Rama, and finished in second place in the Vans Park Series Oceania Championships. In 2019, the Australian Broadcasting Corporation's Fierce Girls biographical podcast series released an episode about Norris titled Sabre Norris — the girl who shreds waves and skate parks.

In 2021, she appeared in the documentary film Tall Poppy: A Skater's Story, about 21-year-old Australian skateboarder Poppy Starr Olsen.

=== YouTube ===
Sabre Norris and her family have several YouTube channels, which focus on the Norris family and document birthdays, gaming, and other "challenges". As of January 2025, they have around 15 million subscribers across their seven channels.
