= If Everyone Cared =

2006 single by Nickelback

Single by Nickelback

from the album All the Right Reasons
- B-side: "Too Bad"; "Someday"
- Released: November 13, 2006
- Studio: Mountainview (Abbotsford, British Columbia)
- Genre: Post-grunge
- Length: 3:38
- Label: Roadrunner; EMI (Canada)
- Songwriters: Chad Kroeger; Ryan Peake; Mike Kroeger; Daniel Adair
- Producers: Nickelback; Joey Moi

Nickelback singles chronology
"Rockstar" (2006)	"If Everyone Cared" (2006)	"Side of a Bullet" (2007)

Music video
- "If Everyone Cared" on YouTube

"If Everyone Cared" is a song by Canadian rock band Nickelback. It was issued as the sixth single from their fifth studio album, All the Right Reasons (2005), in Australia on November 13, 2006, and in the United States on January 7, 2007. It debuted at No. 50 on the US Billboard Hot 100 in late January 2007 and climbed to No. 17. The song also reached No. 1 on the Billboard Adult Top 40 chart.

It was announced that 100% of all digital sales for the song will be donated to the charities of Amnesty International, and the International Children's Awareness Canada.

== Music video ==
The video for the song was directed by Dori Oskowitz and produced by Justin Cronkite. It shows the band performing the song in a studio, interspersed with vintage footage and pictures representing famous world leaders. Those leaders are, in order: Bob Geldof, the founder of Live Aid, Betty Williams, a Nobel Peace Prize laureate, and Nelson Mandela, who ended the Apartheid movement in South Africa. Their stories are also shown in text during their respective scenes. Another scene focuses on the formation of Amnesty International. The video ends with the band finishing the song and packing up, which then cuts to more footage of Williams, followed by a quote from Margaret Mead.

== Track listing ==
1. "If Everyone Cared" (album version) – 3:38
2. "Too Bad" (acoustic)
3. "Someday" (acoustic)
4. "If Everyone Cared" (edit version)

== Personnel ==
- Chad Kroeger – lead and backing vocals, lead guitar
- Ryan Peake – rhythm guitar, backing vocals
- Mike Kroeger – bass
- Daniel Adair – drums
- Timmy Dawson – piano

== Charts ==
=== Weekly charts ===
Chart (2006–2007)	Peak position
Australia (ARIA)	32
Austria (Ö3 Austria Top 40)	12
Belgium (Ultratip Bubbling Under Flanders)	7
Canada Hot 100 (Billboard)	7
Canada CHR/Top 40 (Billboard)	7
Canada Hot AC (Billboard)	2
Canada Rock (Billboard)	15
CIS Airplay (TopHit)	27
Germany (GfK)	21
Germany Airplay (BVMI)	5
Netherlands (Single Top 100)	99
Russia Airplay (TopHit)	26
Slovakia Airplay (ČNS IFPI)	9
Switzerland (Schweizer Hitparade)	19
Ukraine Airplay (TopHit)	57
US Billboard Hot 100	17
US Adult Contemporary (Billboard)	17
US Adult Pop Airplay (Billboard)	1
US Mainstream Rock Airplay (Billboard)	37
US Pop Airplay (Billboard)	8

=== Year-end charts ===
Chart (2007)	Position
Austria (Ö3 Austria Top 40)	75
CIS Airplay (TopHit)	49
Germany (Media Control GfK)	95
Russia Airplay (TopHit)	42
Switzerland (Schweizer Hitparade)	66
US Billboard Hot 100	50
US Adult Top 40 (Billboard)	4

== Certifications ==
Region	Certification	Certified units/sales
United States (RIAA)	3× Platinum	3,000,000^{‡}
^{*} Sales figures based on certification alone.^{^} Shipments figures based on certification alone.^{‡} Sales+streaming figures based on certification alone.

== Release history ==
Region	Date
Australia	November 13, 2006
Europe	December 2006
United States	January 7, 2007
