= Animals (Nickelback song) =

2005 single by Nickelback

Single by Nickelback

from the album All the Right Reasons
- B-side: "Follow You Home" (live)
- Released: November 21, 2005
- Studio: Mountainview (Abbotsford, British Columbia)
- Genre: Hard rock
- Length: 3:06
- Label: Roadrunner
- Songwriters: Daniel Adair; Chad Kroeger; Mike Kroeger

Nickelback singles chronology
"Photograph" (2005)	"Animals" (2005)	"Far Away" (2006)

"Animals" is a song by Canadian rock band Nickelback. It was released in November 2005 as the second American single from their fifth studio album, All the Right Reasons. In Australia, the song was released as the album's fourth single in mid-2006. "Animals" reached number one on the US Billboard Mainstream Rock Tracks chart and number 27 in Australia.

== Music ==
"Animals" is a fast-paced song with a "thick, aggressive hard rock tone", according to Guitar Chalk. The song features lyrics about a couple having sex in a car, with their sexual interaction compared to "animals", until the couple are discovered by the woman's father.

== Reception ==
Christopher Rosa of VH1 wrote: "I'm confused why women in Nickelback's lyrics have to get sexual the second they enter a scene. They're capable of more than playing with your gears, Chad".

== Track listing ==
Australian CD single
No.	Title	Length
1.	"Animals"	3:03
2.	"Animals" (live)	3:50
3.	"Follow You Home" (live)	4:21

== Charts ==
Chart (2005–2006)	Peak position
Australia (ARIA)	27
Canada Rock Top 30 (Radio & Records)	2
US Billboard Hot 100	97
US Alternative Airplay (Billboard)	16
US Mainstream Rock Airplay (Billboard)	1

== Certifications ==
Region	Certification	Certified units/sales
New Zealand (RMNZ)	Platinum	30,000^{‡}
United Kingdom (BPI)	Gold	400,000^{‡}
United States (RIAA)	4× Platinum	4,000,000^{‡}
^{‡} Sales+streaming figures based on certification alone.

== See also ==
- List of Billboard Mainstream Rock number-one songs of the 2000s
