= Photograph (Nickelback song) =

2005 Nickelback song

- Worldwide cover

Single by Nickelback

from the album All the Right Reasons
- B-side: "We Will Rock You"
- Released: August 8, 2005
- Studio: Abbotsford (British Columbia, Canada)
- Genre: Post-grunge; alternative rock; soft rock; country
- Length: 4:19 (album version); 3:55 (radio edit)
- Label: Roadrunner
- Songwriters: Chad Kroeger; Mike Kroeger; Ryan Peake; Daniel Adair
- Producers: Nickelback; Joey Moi

Nickelback singles chronology
"Because of You" (2004)	"Photograph" (2005)	"Animals" (2005)

Nickelback UK singles chronology
"See You at the Show" (2004)	"Photograph" (2005)	"Far Away" (2006)

Nickelback UK singles chronology
"Rockstar" (2007)	"Photograph" (re-release) (2008)	"Far Away" (re-release) (2008)

Music video
- "Photograph" on YouTube

"Photograph" is a song by Canadian rock band Nickelback. It was released on August 8, 2005, as the first single from their fifth studio album, All the Right Reasons. The song peaked at number two in the United States and entered the top 10 in Australia, Austria, Canada, the Netherlands, and New Zealand.

== Background ==
"Photograph", a post-grunge, alternative rock, soft rock and country song, is mostly autobiographical. Singer Chad Kroeger said, "It's just nostalgia, growing up in a small town, and you can't go back to your childhood. Saying goodbye to friends that you've drifted away from, where you grew up, where you went to school, who you hung out with and the dumb stuff you used to do as a kid, the first love—all of those things. Everyone has one or two of those memories that they are fond of, so this song is really just the bridge for all that".

Kroeger said the photograph he holds up in the music video of himself and his friend Joey Moi with a champagne chiller on Joey's head is the same one he referred to in the lyrics. He also admitted he had broken into his high school to steal money from the office safe eleven times, but "half a dozen" flowed better for the lyrics.

== Chart performance ==
The single became the band's third top ten hit in the United States, peaking at number two on the Billboard Hot 100 chart. The song also topped the Billboard Mainstream Rock Tracks and Pop 100 charts. "Photograph" has sold over 1.4 million digital downloads in the US according to Nielsen SoundScan and is certified quadraple platinum by the Recording Industry Association of America (RIAA). "Photograph" was the first of three top-10 hits from All the Right Reasons in New Zealand, peaking at number four.

In 2008, the single was once again showing on future single release lists in the UK. The single was re-released on June 23, 2008, to capitalise on the success of "Rockstar". "Photograph" was added to the C-list at BBC Radio 1 on May 21, 2008, climbing to the B-list the following week, and then to the A-List. It was also added to the BBC Radio 2 C-list. "Photograph" originally peaked at number 29 upon its first release, three years earlier. The song re-entered the UK Singles Chart at number 52 on June 10, 2008, climbed to number 29 a week later and reached a peak of number 18, two weeks after the physical release, out peaking the original release of the song.

== Music video ==
The music video was directed by Nigel Dick and was filmed in Hanna, Alberta, Canada, the band's hometown. It begins with Chad Kroeger, the video's protagonist, walking along a lonely, sparsely populated street, holding up a photograph of himself and Nickelback's producer, Joey Moi (who is referred to in the line "And what the hell is on Joey's head?"). As the song progresses to the line "And this is where I grew up", he walks to a rusty mailbox, addressed as number 29025. As he speaks of sneaking out, the camera does not show the house itself but does show a view from the inside looking out at him, possibly suggesting someone else lives there now. He continues walking and comes to an older building marked as "Hanna High School" on the front (which is now a vacant field, as the building has been demolished since then) announcing, "And this is where I went to school". He and his three other band members enter the gym with their gear and put on a seemingly impromptu concert alone. During the chorus, two band members go to an old junkyard and reminisce about a field where the rest of the band and their girlfriends are partying. Another experiences a similar event near an abandoned train yard, seeing his old girlfriend (most likely Kim, who was "the first girl I kissed") run near the tracks and kiss his younger self. The Hanna Roundhouse is shown. The camera then switches to flashbacks of various people ("I miss that town, I miss the faces") As the video ends, the flashback people get in their cars to go home as the band finishes the song.

A screenshot of the part of the video that became a meme

One particular shot from the video, with Kroeger holding up a picture frame at the lyric "Look at this photograph", became an Internet meme, with users replacing the contents of the frame with other pictures. At the time of the song's release, the meme has been part of the general negative attitudes towards the band, and as attitudes towards the band shifted towards more favorable appreciation, the meme was still used for humorous purposes.

== Legacy ==
=== Use by Donald Trump ===
In early October 2019, United States President Donald Trump used a portion of the music video and song within a video posted on his Twitter account; it had the opening four words of the song in all capital letters as the caption for the tweet as used in the Internet meme taken from the video. The video was about former Vice President (and, later, President of the United States) Joe Biden and his son Hunter. The photo shows them on a golf course with Hunter's business partner, Devon Archer and raises questions about the precise nature of Archer and Hunter's past relations with Burisma in Ukraine, while also taking a shot at the elder Biden's appearance with the lyrics "What the hell is on Joey's head?".

The video containing the music video and four words of the song was subsequently removed from Twitter with the following message substituted in place of the video: "This media has been disabled in response to a report by the copyright owner". This entire series of actions, the posting of the video and its removal, was met with a significant rise in digital on-demand streaming of the song and music video as well as digital download sales of the song compared to streamings and downloads on the days before the tweet.

=== Google Photos ===
The band created a parody of the song for a Google Photos advertisement released in December 2020, with the lyrics making fun of Kroeger's own photographic history, including his noodle-like hair.

== Track listings ==
CD single

1. "Photograph" [album version] – 4:21
2. "Photograph" [edit] – 3:55
3. "We Will Rock You" – 2:01
4. "Photograph" [video]

2008 CD single (UK re-release)

1. "Photograph" [radio mix] – 3:49
2. "We Will Rock You" – 4:29

== Charts ==
=== Weekly charts ===
Chart (2005–2008)	Peak position
Australia (ARIA)	3
Austria (Ö3 Austria Top 40)	10
Belgium (Ultratip Bubbling Under Flanders)	2
Belgium (Ultratip Bubbling Under Wallonia)	9
Canada CHR/Pop Top 30 (Radio & Records)	3
Canada Hot AC Top 30 (Radio & Records)	1
Canada Rock Top 30 (Radio & Records)	2
Czech Republic (Radio Top 100)	17
Europe (European Hot 100)	31
Germany (GfK)	18
Hungary (Rádiós Top 40)	40
Ireland (IRMA)	24
Italy (FIMI)	42
Netherlands (Dutch Top 40)	4
Netherlands (Single Top 100)	16
New Zealand (Recorded Music NZ)	4
Sweden (Sverigetopplistan)	40
Switzerland (Schweizer Hitparade)	27
UK Singles (Official Charts)	18
UK Rock & Metal (Official Charts)	1
US Billboard Hot 100	2
US Adult Contemporary (Billboard)	16
US Adult Pop Airplay (Billboard)	1
US Alternative Airplay (Billboard)	3
US Mainstream Rock Airplay (Billboard)	1
US Pop 100 (Billboard)	1
US Pop Airplay (Billboard)	3

=== Year-end charts ===
Chart (2005)	Position
Australia (ARIA)	45
Netherlands (Dutch Top 40)	39
US Billboard Hot 100	43
US Adult Top 40 (Billboard)	33
US Mainstream Rock Tracks (Billboard)	19
US Mainstream Top 40 (Billboard)	56
US Modern Rock Tracks (Billboard)	46

Chart (2006)	Position
US Billboard Hot 100	38
US Adult Contemporary (Billboard)	38
US Adult Top 40 (Billboard)	7

== Certifications ==
Region	Certification	Certified units/sales
Australia (ARIA)	Gold	35,000^{^}
Canada (Music Canada)	Platinum	20,000^{*}
New Zealand (RMNZ)	Platinum	30,000^{‡}
United Kingdom (BPI)	Platinum	600,000^{‡}
United States (RIAA)	4× Platinum	4,000,000^{‡}
^{*} Sales figures based on certification alone.^{^} Shipments figures based on certification alone.^{‡} Sales+streaming figures based on certification alone.

== Release history ==
Region	Date	Format(s)	Label(s)	Ref.
United States	August 8, 2005	Mainstream rock; active rock; alternative radio	Roadrunner	
United States	September 5, 2005	Hot adult contemporary radio	Roadrunner	
United States	September 6, 2005	Contemporary hit radio	Roadrunner	
Australia	September 12, 2005	CD	Roadrunner	
Japan	September 14, 2005	CD	Roadrunner	
United Kingdom	September 26, 2005	CD	Roadrunner	
