= Far Away (Nickelback song) =

2006 single by Nickelback

Single by Nickelback

from the album All the Right Reasons
- Released: January 23, 2006
- Studio: Mountainview (Abbotsford, British Columbia)
- Genre: Soft rock
- Length: 3:59 (album version); 3:42 (edit version)
- Label: Roadrunner
- Songwriters: Chad Kroeger; Ryan Peake; Mike Kroeger; Daniel Adair
- Producers: Joey Moi; Nickelback

Nickelback singles chronology
"Animals" (2005)	"Far Away" (2006)	"Savin' Me" (2006)

Nickelback British singles chronology
"Photograph" (2005)	"Far Away" (2006)	"Savin' Me" (2006)

Nickelback British singles chronology
"Photograph" (2008)	"Far Away" (2008)	"Gotta Be Somebody" (2008)

Music video
- "Far Away" on YouTube

"Far Away" is a song by Canadian band Nickelback. First released on January 23, 2006, in Australia, it was the second international single, fourth US single, and third single overall from the band's fifth album, All the Right Reasons (2005). The band's lead singer and guitarist Chad Kroeger described this song on the Tour when in Australia as the "only real love song" that Nickelback has. He described many others as "being about love" but not solely about "being in love".

"Far Away" peaked at number eight in the United States, making All the Right Reasons the only Nickelback album to have more than one US top-10 hit. In Australia and New Zealand, the song peaked at number two, giving Nickelback their highest-charting hit in both countries. The song was re-released in the United Kingdom on September 22, 2008, following the success of "Rockstar" and the re-release of "Photograph". This release also reached number 40 in the UK singles chart, equalling its original chart peak, although this re-release was download-only.

== Composition ==
The song is written in the key of B major and follows a slow tempo of 67 beats per minute in common time. It follows a chord progression of Bmaj7 – F♯sus – G♯m7 – E6/9, and the vocals span from E_{3} to A♭_{4}. In the final chorus of the song, the key changes to D♭ major.

== Commercial performance ==
"Far Away" was a huge success in the US and became the band's fourth top-10 single on the Billboard Hot 100, peaking at number 8. The song was the second top-10 single from their latest album All the Right Reasons after the leading single of the album, "Photograph", which peaked at number two on the chart. It was certified five-times platinum by Recording Industry Association of America (RIAA) in 2026.

== Music video ==
The music video for "Far Away" was first shown on VH1's V-Spot. Filmed at Green Timbers Urban Forest Park in Surrey, British Columbia just outside Vancouver, the video starts with a couple in bed, when a cellphone rings and the husband is forced to leave. It is revealed that he is a firefighter, and has been called to help fight a forest fire.

As the song moves on, we see the firefighters dropped right into the middle of the fire by a helicopter, which quickly overwhelms them and forces them to retreat. The husband goes back to help a fallen firefighter, and watches the helicopter leave without him. After the husband sees the helicopter leave, a large, fiery tree is seen falling, presumably onto him. This footage is inter-cut with his wife watching the news about the fire.

Later, she receives a phone call, and breaks down, as it appears that she has been informed that her husband has died. She rushes outside to see several firefighters emerge from a truck...including her husband, covered in soot. She rushes to him and hugs him, and the video ends.

The entire song also features inter-cuts to the band playing in a large, strobe light-filled red and orange room.

VH1 later named this video as the third-best song on the Top 40 Videos of 2006, behind "Hips Don't Lie" by Shakira and ahead of "SexyBack" by Justin Timberlake.

== Track listings and formats ==
CD single (UK)

1. "Far Away" [Album Version] – 4:01
2. "Far Away" [Edit Version] – 3:42
3. "Mistake" [Live in Edmonton] – 5:11
4. "Photograph" [Acoustic] Rolling Stone Original – 6:55
5. "Far Away" [Video]

CD single

1. "Far Away" [Edit Version] – 3:42
2. "Mistake" [Live in Edmonton] – 5:11
3. "Photograph" [Acoustic] Rolling Stone Original – 6:55

Deluxe edition

1. "Far Away" [Album Version] – 4:01
2. "Far Away" [Edit Version] – 3:42

== Charts ==
=== Weekly charts ===
Chart (2006–2008)	Peak position
Australia (ARIA)	2
Austria (Ö3 Austria Top 40)	22
Belgium (Ultratop 50 Flanders)	45
Canada Hot 100 (Billboard)	50
Canada AC (Billboard)	18
Canada CHR/Top 40 (Billboard)	3
Canada Hot AC (Billboard)	1
Czech Republic Airplay (ČNS IFPI)	56
European Hot 100 Singles (Billboard)	69
Germany Airplay (BVMI)	4
Ireland (IRMA)	17
Netherlands (Dutch Top 40)	18
Netherlands (Single Top 100)	31
New Zealand (Recorded Music NZ)	2
Slovakia Airplay (ČNS IFPI)	56
Sweden (Sverigetopplistan)	51
Switzerland (Schweizer Hitparade)	41
UK Singles (Official Charts)	40
Ukraine Airplay (TopHit)	146
US Billboard Hot 100	8
US Adult Contemporary (Billboard)	5
US Adult Pop Airplay (Billboard)	1
US Pop Airplay (Billboard)	1

=== Year-end charts ===
Chart (2006)	Position
Australia (ARIA)	53
Brazil (Crowley)	33
US Billboard Hot 100	53
US Adult Top 40 (Billboard)	17

Chart (2007)	Position
US Billboard Hot 100	94
US Adult Contemporary (Billboard)	10
US Adult Top 40 (Billboard)	22

== Certifications ==
Region	Certification	Certified units/sales
Australia (ARIA)	Gold	35,000^{^}
Denmark (IFPI Danmark)	Gold	45,000^{‡}
New Zealand (RMNZ)	2× Platinum	60,000^{‡}
United Kingdom (BPI)	Gold	400,000^{‡}
United States (RIAA)	5× Platinum	5,000,000^{‡}
^{^} Shipments figures based on certification alone.^{‡} Sales+streaming figures based on certification alone.

== Release history ==
Region	Date	Format(s)	Label(s)	Ref.
Australia	January 23, 2006	CD1	Roadrunner	
Australia	February 6, 2006	CD2	Roadrunner	
Japan	February 8, 2006	CD	Roadrunner	
United Kingdom	February 13, 2006	CD	Roadrunner	
United States	August 1, 2006	Contemporary hit radio	Roadrunner	
United States	August 7, 2006	Hot adult contemporary radio	Roadrunner	
United Kingdom (re-release)	September 22, 2006	—N/a	Roadrunner	
