= Don't Let Me Go =

Single by The Click Five

from the album TCV
- Released: November 16, 2010
- Genre: Alternative rock; soft rock
- Length: 4:08
- Label: Warner Music; Lojinx
- Songwriter: Ethan Mentzer

The Click Five singles chronology
"The Way It Goes" (2010)	"Don't Let Me Go" (2010)

"Don't Let Me Go" is a song by American power pop band The Click Five, released on November 16, 2010, as the third single taken from their third studio album TCV.

== Background and composition ==
The song was written by bassist Ethan Mentzer, which he wrote while the band was in tour in Asia. The song was performed during tours and shows in 2008 by lead vocalist Kyle Patrick and Ethan, with Ethan on guitar and Kyle singing. The group did a campaign in Southeast Asia to help fight human trafficking and exploitation, as well as performing songs during their trip. According to keyboardist Ben Romans, "Don't Let Me Go" was a song that stood out to them. Romans also said that the lyric "you try to hide your scars, and all the while... don't let me go, don't turn away" was "one of most powerful" lyrics they wrote and in general, the song is about hanging on. The song is a slower tempo track, much like the band's previous single "Empty", opening up with an acoustic sound.

== Chart performance ==
"Don't Let Me Go" reached a peak of number 5 on the weekly Top 20 charts on Singapore radio station 987FM. It stayed on the chart for nine weeks. At the end of the year 2011, it ranked number 55 in the best songs of 2011.

== Music video ==
MTV EXIT picked up the song to help raise awareness about human trafficking. The band worked with MTV EXIT to produce a music video, which was released on April 15, 2011. Kyle Patrick said of the song and video, "I've always seen music as an escape from reality and that became even more apparent when we performed at the Somaly Mam shelter for victims of trafficking in Cambodia. For those few hours, we were able to give the victims a chance to forget what they had been through. That is what music is all about and if it can be helpful in a situation like this, we're very happy to be able to do that." The video was nominated at the 2011 Asian Television Award for Best Music Program.

== Personnel ==
Credits for "Don't Let Me Go" adapted from album's liner notes.

The Click Five

- Kyle Patrick – lead vocals, rhythm guitar
- Joe Guese – lead guitar, backing vocals
- Ben Romans – synthesizers, backing vocals
- Ethan Mentzer – bass, acoustic guitar, backing vocals
- Joey Zehr – drums, percussion, backing vocals

Additional musicians

- Trevor Jarvis – cello

== Charts ==
Chart performance for "Don't Let Me Go"
Chart (2011)	Peak position
Singapore Airplay (Mediacorp)	5
