= TCV (album) =

Studio album by The Click Five
- Released: November 16, 2010
- Recorded: June 2010
- Studio: Q Division (Somervile, MA)
- Genre: Power pop; pop
- Length: 43:30
- Label: Warner Music; Lojinx
- Producer: Mike Denneen

The Click Five chronology
Modern Minds and Pastimes (2007)	TCV (2010)

Singles from TCV
- 1. "I Quit! I Quit! I Quit!" Released: April 2009; 2. "The Way It Goes" Released: August 6, 2010; 3. "Don't Let Me Go" Released: November 16, 2010

Digital cover
- Artwork used on digital streaming and download services

TCV is the third studio album by American rock band The Click Five. It was released in Asia on November 16, 2010, through Warner Music and was released in North America on May 17, 2011. The album was also released in Europe on May 30, 2011, via Lojinx.

== Background ==
The band released their second studio album, Modern Minds and Pastimes on June 26, 2007, and despite high expectations, the album only sold 50,000 copies and reached number 136 on the Billboard 200. As a result the group was dropped by their record label, Atlantic. According to producer Mike Denneen said, "Atlantic was unwilling to let them become a 'real' band, which is what the guys wanted. Now they're calling the shots and having the opportunity to do what most bands do at the beginning: play and write songs and develop." Guitarist Joe Guese said that "this is a chance to reintroduce ourselves" after they were dropped by the label. Following a tour in support of Modern Minds and Pastimes, they began recording their third studio album with Denneen. It was recorded in a span of eight days at Q Division Studios. This is the second album to feature Kyle Patrick who stated, "For me it was a different thing because I wasn't in the band for that first record [Greetings from Imrie House]. So it's just a little bit harder for me to understand where the other guys were coming from and making that first record because I wasn't there. But I appreciate that record very much, and I feel there's elements of that came out of the other four guys. So I feel it came out more in this recent release just because we were trying to get back to our roots and is a little bit heightened on this record. It just felt more of a unified effort."

== Release ==
The album's lead single, "I Quit! I Quit! I Quit!" was released for digital download in April 2009, and was later released as a vinyl format. The second single, "The Way It Goes" was released for radio airplay in Singapore on August 6, 2010. On November 16, the album was released in Singapore, with other international release dates to come. "Don't Let Me Go" was also released on the same day as the third and final single. The music video for the single was released on April 15, 2011, in partnership with MTV EXIT to bring awareness about human trafficking. In support of the album's release, the group embarked on their headlining Way Back to You tour in May 2011. It was released in North America on May 17, 2011, via Q Division.

== Reception ==
Professional ratings
Review scores
Source	Rating
Melodic	4/5 stars

Kaj Roth of Melodic gave the album a positive review stating, "Former frontman Eric Dill was replaced by Kyle Patrick on the 2nd album and he did a fine job but the songs didn't match the extremely well done first album... but I must say this album is filled with plenty of ear candy that I want to return to over and over again."

== Track listing ==
Asian edition
No.	Title	Length
1.	"The Way It Goes"	3:27
2.	"I Quit! I Quit! I Quit!"	3:10
3.	"Nobody's Business"	3:19
4.	"Love Still Goes On"	3:48
5.	"Don't Let Me Go"	4:09
6.	"Fever for Shakin'"	3:54
7.	"Way Back to You"	3:35
8.	"The World Comes Crawlin' Back"	3:49
9.	"Good as Gold"	3:43
10.	"Be in Love"	3:29
11.	"Black Boots"	2:51
12.	"Just Like My Heart Falls"	4:16
Total length:		43:30

European edition
No.	Title	Length
1.	"I Quit! I Quit! I Quit!"	3:09
2.	"Fever for Shakin'"	3:53
3.	"Dancin' After Midnight"	4:27
4.	"The World Comes Crawlin' Back"	3:49
5.	"Way Back to You"	3:33
6.	"Just Like My Heart Falls"	4:17
7.	"Be in Love"	2:46
8.	"Nobody's Business"	3:18
9.	"The Way It Goes"	3:26
10.	"Don't Let Me Go"	4:08
11.	"Good as Gold"	3:40
12.	"Love Time Space"	4:19
Total length:		44:45

North American edition
No.	Title	Length
1.	"I Quit! I Quit! I Quit!"	3:09
2.	"The Way It Goes"	3:26
3.	"Way Back to You"	3:33
4.	"Fever for Shakin'"	3:53
5.	"Good as Gold"	3:40
6.	"Don't Let Me Go"	4:08
7.	"Nobody's Business"	3:16
8.	"Be in Love"	2:47
9.	"Dancin' After Midnight"	4:38
10.	"Just Like My Heart Falls"	4:15
11.	"The World Comes Crawlin' Back"	3:48
12.	"Love Time Space"	4:18
13.	"Black Boots"	2:49
14.	"Love Still Goes On"	3:45

== Personnel ==
Credits adapted from album's liner notes.

The Click Five

- Kyle Patrick – lead vocals, rhythm guitar
- Joe Guese – lead guitar, backing vocals
- Ben Romans – keyboards, backing vocals
- Ethan Mentzer – bass, guitar, backing vocals
- Joey Zehr – drums, percussion, backing vocals

Additional musicians

- Ben Jaffie – saxophone
- Dave Wanamaker – vocals
- John Powhida – vocals
- Patria Moody – trumpet
- Paul Jones – saxophone
- Richard Herber – banjo
- Trevor Jarvis – cello

Production

- Mike Denneen – producer, mixing
- Andy VanDette – mastering
- Joey Zehr – art direction
- Joe Tooley – assistant engineering
- Matt Beaudoin – engineering
- Matt Tahaney – engineering
- Mike Shipley – mixing
- Carl Plaster – drum technician
- Patty Palazzo – photo retouching
- Stephanie Pistel – photography

== Charts ==
Chart performance for TCV
Chart (2011)	Peak position
South Korean Overseas Albums (Gaon)	20

== Release history ==
Release history and formats for TCV
Region	Date	Format	Label	Ref.
Singapore	November 16, 2010	CD	Warner Music Singapore	
Korea	January 2011	CD	Warner Music Korea	
Taiwan	April 19, 2011	CD	Warner Music Taiwan	
North America	May 17, 2011	Digital download	Q Division	
Europe	May 30, 2011	CD; digital download	Lojinx	
North America	July 19, 2011	CD	Q Division	
