= In My Head =

In My Head may refer to:

== Albums ==
- In My Head (album), by Black Flag, 1985
- In My Head, by Robert Lamm, 1999

== Songs ==
- "In My Head" (Stray Kids song), 2025
- "In My Head" (Ariana Grande song), 2019
- "In My Head" (CNBLUE song), 2011
- "In My Head" (Jason Derulo song), 2009
- "In My Head" (Juice Wrld song), 2022
- "In My Head" (Lil Tjay song), 2022
- "In My Head" (Loreen song), 2013
- "In My Head" (Madcon song), 2013
- "In My Head" (Queens of the Stone Age song), 2005
- "In My Head", by Dierks Bentley from Home, 2012
- "In My Head", by Eric Dill from Forever Is Not Enough, 2012
- "In My Head", by Kiss from Carnival of Souls: The Final Sessions, 1997
- "In My Head", by the Lemon Twigs from Everything Harmony, 2023
- "In My Head", by Lights from Pep, 2022
- "In My Head", by Maisie Peters from Dressed Too Nice For a Jacket, 2018
- "In My Head", by NewDad from Madra, 2024
- "In My Head", by No Doubt from Rock Steady, 2001
- "In My Head", by Psapp from Early Cats and Tracks, 2005
- "In My Head", by Snow Strippers from April Mixtape 2, 2022
- "In My Head", by Underground Lovers from Rushall Station, 1996
- "In My Head", by White Town from Peek & Poke, 2000
- "In My Head", by Your Vegas from A Town and Two Cities, 2008
