= Chris Braide =

British songwriter and producer

- Also known as: Magical Thinker
- Born: Christopher Braide
- Origin: Warrington, Lancashire, England
- Genres: Pop; pop rock
- Occupations: Songwriter; record producer; singer
- Instruments: Vocals; keyboards; guitar
- Years active: 1990–present
- Website: christopherbraide.com

Christopher Braide is an English songwriter, record producer and singer, based in the Cotswolds, England, United Kingdom.

First signed as a solo artist by David A. Stewart in the UK and Craig Kallman at Atlantic Records in the US, Braide relocated to Los Angeles to produce and write for artists including Sia, Lana Del Rey, Britney Spears, Nicki Minaj, Christina Aguilera, Selena Gomez, David Guetta, Halsey, Wrabel, Marc Almond, Beth Ditto, Yuna and Beyoncé.

Braide is a frequent collaborator of Sia; together they have written for her own projects, movie soundtracks and for several other artists. Notable songs they have written over the years include "Kill and Run" for The Great Gatsby film and soundtrack, "Helium" for the 2017 Fifty Shades Darker film and soundtrack, "Pretty Isn't Perfect" and "Unstoppable" for the Rio 2016 Olympic Games, "God Made You Beautiful" for the Beyoncé film Life Is But a Dream, "Perfume" for Britney Spears, "Blank Page" for Christina Aguilera, and "She Wolf (Falling to Pieces)" for David Guetta featuring Sia. Most recently, their song "Helium" was remixed for MAC cosmetics a collaboration for the cosmetic company's AIDS Fund by David Guetta and Afrojack, and a new single, "Flames", was released by David Guetta.

In 2022, the song "Unstoppable" was released to radio as an official single in the United States after gaining popularity through commercials and video-sharing app TikTok. It became No.1 on the Adult Pop Airplay Chart 6 years after its release and is the first record in a quarter of a century to be in the charts for over 100 weeks.

He has a duo group with Geoff Downes (Yes, Buggles, Asia and others), called Downes Braide Association (DBA), since 2012.

Braide has won an Ivor Novello award and been nominated for a Grammy. He is published by BMG Rights Management worldwide and Magical Thinking BMI.

== Select songwriting and production discography ==
Year	Artist	Album	Label	Song	Writer/Producer
2026	Chaka Khan + Lenny Kravitz	"Chakzilla"	Earthsong/BMG	"Bring the Party"	Writer
2025	Macy Gray	"Sneaks (film)"	10 Summers Recors/BMG	"In Love With Anyone"	Writer
2024	Zayn Malik	"10 Lives"		"Happy Tonight"	Writer
2022	Sia	Unstoppable	Monkey Puzzle/RCA	"Unstoppable"	Writer/Producer
2021	Sia	Music – Songs from and Inspired by the Motion Picture	Monkey Puzzle/Atlantic	"Music"	Writer/Producer
2020	Toni Braxton	Spell My Name	Island Records	"Saturday Night"	Writer/Producer
2020	Halsey		Astralwerks	"Honesty"	Writer/Producer
2020	Marc Almond	Chaos and a Dancing Star	BMG	All Songs	Writer/Producer
2020	Mayer Hawthorne	Rare Changes	Big Bucks	"M.O."	Writer
2019	Freya Ridings	Freya Ridings	Good Soldier	"Still Have You"	Writer/Producer
2019	Sia ft Hans Zimmer	Seven Worlds, One Planet	BBC	Out There	Writer/Producer
2019	Evie Irie	5 weeks in LA	Republic	"Vulnerable"	Writer/Producer
2019	Natalie Portman / Celeste	Vox Lux (soundtrack)	Columbia	"Wrapped Up", "Your Body Talk"	Writer/Producer
2018	Nicki Minaj	Queen	Young Money/Cash Money/Republic	"Come See About Me"	Writer/Producer
2018	Sia & David Guetta	7	What A Music/Warner	"Flames"	Writer/Producer
2018	Sia vs. David Guetta & Afrojack	MAC	Monkey Puzzle	"Helium"	Writer/Producer
2018	LP	Heart to Mouth	Vagrant/BMG	"Recovery"	Writer/Producer
2018	Robin Schulz ft Erika Sirola	IIII	Atlantic	"Speechless (Robin Schulz song)"	Writer
2017	Sia	Ballerina (titled Leap! in the United States)	Gaumont	"Suitcase"	Writer/Producer
2017	Robin Schulz	Uncovered (Robin Schulz album)	Warner	"I Believe I'm Fine"	Writer/Producer
2017	Marc Almond	Shadows and Reflections	BMG	"Embers"	Writer/Producer
2017	Elle King	Estee Lauder Ft Kendall Jenner	RCA/ Magical Thinker Records	"Wild Love"	Writer/Producer
2017	Allie X	CollXtion II	Twin Music	"True Love Is Violent"	Writer/Producer
2017	Wrabel	Estee Lauder Ft Magical Thinker & Wrabel	Epic/ Magical Thinker Records	"It's You"	Writer/Producer
2017	Meg Mac	Low Blows	Little Big Man	"Don't Need Permission"	Producer
2017	Halsey	Hopeless Fountain Kingdom	Astralwerks	"The Prologue"	Writer
2017	Lea Michele	Places	Columbia	"Heavy Love"	Writer
2017	Sia	Fifty Shades Darker: Original Motion Picture Soundtrack	Republic	"Helium"	Writer/Producer
2017	Marc Almond	Hits and Pieces: The Best of Marc Almond and Soft Cell	UMC	"A Kind of Love"	Writer/Producer
2016	Sia	This Is Acting (Deluxe Version)	Columbia	"Confetti"	Writer/Producer
2016	Sia	This Is Acting (Deluxe Version)	Columbia	"Midnight Decisions"	Writer/Producer
2016	Sia	This Is Acting	Columbia	"Unstoppable"	Writer/Producer
2016	Sia	This Is Acting	Columbia	"Space Between"	Writer/Producer
2016	Rozes/ Elizabeth Mencel			Under The Grave	Writer/Producer
2015	Selena Gomez	Revival	Interscope	Camouflage	Writer/Producer
2015	Halsey	Room 93	Astralwerks/Capitol	"Trouble"	Writer/Producer
2015	Marc Almond	The Velvet Trail	Cherry Red Records	All songs	Co-Writer/Producer
2015	Kate Pierson	Guitars and Microphones	Kobalt	"4 songs"	Writer/Producer
2015	Katharine McPhee	Hysteria	eOne	Round Your Little Finger	Writer/Producer
2014	Sia	1000 Forms of Fear	Columbia	"Eye of the Needle"	Writer
2014	Sia	1000 Forms of Fear	Columbia	"Big Girls Cry"	Writer/Producer
2014	Colbie Caillat	Gypsy Heart	Universal	"Break Free"	Writer/Producer
2014	Paloma Faith	A Perfect Contradiction	Epic/RCA	"Impossible Heart"	Writer/Producer
2014	Afrojack	Forget the World	Universal / Def Jam	"Ten Feet Tall"	Writer/Producer
2013	Lea Michele	Louder	Columbia	"If You Say So"	Writer/Producer
2013	Lea Michele	Louder	Columbia	"You're Mine"	Writer/Producer
2013	Britney Spears	Britney Jean	RCA	"Perfume"	Writer/Producer
2013	Britney Spears	Britney Jean	RCA	"Brightest Morning Star"	Vocal Producer
2013	Beyoncé	Life Is But a Dream	Columbia	"God Made You Beautiful"	Writer/Producer
2013	Sia	The Great Gatsby soundtrack	Interscope Records	"Kill and Run"	Writer/Producer
2013	David Guetta featuring Sia	Nothing But the Beat 2.0	Virgin Records/ EMI	"She Wolf"	Writer/Producer
2013	Stooshe	London with the Lights On	Warner Bros	"Your Own Kind of Beautiful"	Writer/Producer
2013	Stooshe	London with the Lights On	Warner Bros	"Perfectly Wrong"	Writer/Producer
2013	Yuna	Nocturnal	Verve/ Universal	"Rescue"	Writer/Producer
2013	Yuna	Nocturnal	Verve/ Universal	"Colors"	Writer/Producer
2013	Yuna	Nocturnal	Verve/ Universal	"Escape"	Writer/Producer
2013	Yuna	Nocturnal	Verve/ Universal	"Come Back"	Producer
2013	Yuna	Sixth Street	Verve/ Universal	"Let Love Come Through Ft Kyle"	Writer/ Producer
2013	Sarah Brightman	Dreamchaser	Decca	"Closer"	Writer/ Producer
2012	Lana Del Rey	Born to Die	Interscope	"Million Dollar Man"	Writer/ Producer
2012	Lana Del Rey	Born to Die	Leak	"Damn You"	Writer/ Producer
2012	Lana Del Rey	Born to Die	Leak	"Queen of Disaster"	Writer/ Producer
2012	Lana Del Rey	Born to Die	Leak	"Hollywood's Dead"	Writer/ Producer
2012	Christina Aguilera	Lotus	RCA	"Blank Page"	Writer/ Producer
2012	Paloma Faith	Fall to Grace	Epic	"30 Minute Love Affair"	Writer
2012	Yuna	Yuna	Fader	"Lullabies"	Writer/Producer
2012	Yuna	Yuna	Fader	"Favorite Things"	Writer/Producer
2012	Yuna	Yuna	Fader	"Loud Noises"	Writer/Producer
2012	Yuna	Yuna	Fader	" Islands "	Writer/Producer
2012	Yuna	Yuna	Fader	" Decorate "	Writer/Producer
2012	Delta Goodrem	Child of the Universe	Sony Music	"Hunter and the Wolves"	Producer
2012	Delta Goodrem	Child of the Universe	Sony Music	"Speed of Life"	Producer
2012	Delta Goodrem	Child of the Universe	Sony Music	"Control"	Producer
2011	JLS	Jukebox	Epic	"Killed By Love"	Writer/Producer
2011	Theophilus London	—N/a	Warner Bros	"Century Girl" featuring Dev Hynes	Writer/Producer
2011	Pixie Lott	"Turn It Up Louder"	Mercury	"Doin' Fine (Without You)"	Writer/Producer
2010	Diana Vickers	Songs from the Tainted Cherry Tree	RCA	"The Boy Who Murdered Love"	Writer/Producer
2010	Diana Vickers	Songs from the Tainted Cherry Tree	RCA	"N.U.M.B"	Writer/Producer
2010	Diana Vickers	Songs from the Tainted Cherry Tree	RCA	"Four Leaf Clover"	Writer/Producer
2010	Diana Vickers	Songs from the Tainted Cherry Tree	RCA	"Me and You"	Writer/Producer
2010	JLS	Outta This World	Epic	"That's Where I'm Coming From"	Writer/Producer
2010	Olly Murs	Olly Murs	Epic	"Ask Me to Stay"	Writer
2010	The Saturdays	Wordshaker	Fascination/ Polydor	"Denial"	Writer/Producer
2009	Cheryl Cole	3 Words	Fascination/ Polydor	"Don't Talk About This Love"	Writer
2009	Lolene	The Electrick Hotel	Island Def Jam	"Beautiful Disaster"	Writer/Producer
2009	The Saturdays	Chasing Lights	Fascination/ Polydor	"Chasing Lights"	Writer/Producer
2009	Westlife	Where We Are	Syco Music	"Reach Out"	Writer/Producer
2009	Natalie Bassingthwaighte	1000 Stars	Syco Music	"1000 Stars"	Writer/Producer
2009	Natalie Bassingthwaighte	1000 Stars	Syco Music	"Turn The Lights On"	Writer/Producer
2009	Glenn Tilbrook	Pandemonium Ensues	Quixotic Records	"Little Ships"	Writer
2009	Glenn Tilbrook	Pandemonium Ensues	Quixotic Records	"Melancholy Emotion"	Writer
2008	Will Young	Let It Go	RCA	"If Love Equals Nothing"	Writer/Producer
2008	Leon Jackson	Right Now	Syco	"Don't Call This Love"	Writer/Producer
2008	James Morrison	Songs for You, Truths for Me	Polydor	"Save Yourself"	Writer
2008	JLS	JLS	Epic	"Heal This Heartbreak"	Writer
2007	David Jordan	Set the Mood	ZTT	"Fight the World"	Writer
2007	David Jordan	Set the Mood	ZTT	"Only Living Soul"	Writer
2007	The Click Five	Modern Minds and Pastimes	Atlantic Records	"Jenny"	Writer
2007	The Click Five	Modern Minds and Pastimes	Atlantic Records	"Happy Birthday"	Writer
2007	The Click Five	Modern Minds and Pastimes	Atlantic Records	"I'm Getting Over You"	Writer
2006	Duncan James	Future Past	Innocent Records	"Sooner or Later"	Writer
2006	Duncan James	Future Past	Innocent Records	"Somebody Still Loves You"	Writer
2006	Duncan James	Future Past	Innocent Records	"I Come Alive"	Writer
2006	Duncan James	Future Past	Innocent Records	"Frequency"	Writer
2006	Duncan James	Future Past	Innocent Records	"Letter to God"	Writer
2006	Beverley Knight	Voice – The Best of Beverley Knight	Parlophone Records	"Not Too Late for Love"	Writer/ Producer
2006	Beverley Knight	Voice – The Best of Beverley Knight	Parlophone Records	"Who's Gonna Save Your Soul"	Writer/ Producer
2006	The Webb Sisters	Daylight Crossing	Universal Records	"Please"	Writer
2004	Jesse McCartney	Beautiful Soul	Hollywood Records	"Because You Live"	Writer/ Producer
2004	Diana DeGarmo	Blue Skies	Sony Music	Dreams	Writer
2004	Diana DeGarmo	Blue Skies	Sony Music	Emotional	Writer
2004	Lara Fabian	A Wonderful Life	Sony Music	I Am	Writer
2004	Beverley Knight	Affirmation	Parlophone	"Not Too Late for Love"	Writer/ Producer
2004	Beverley Knight	Affirmation	Parlophone	"Tea and Sympathy"	Writer/ Producer
2004	Glenn Tilbrook	Transatlantic Ping Pong	Quixotic Records	"Untouchable"	Writer/ Producer
2004	Glenn Tilbrook	Transatlantic Ping Pong	Quixotic Records	"Ray and Me"	Writer
2004	Lisa Stansfield	"The Moment"	ZTT	"If I Hadn't Got You"	Writer
2003	Kylie Minogue	Body Language	Parlophone Records	"After Dark"	Writer/ Producer
2003	Play	Replay	Columbia Records	"Let's Get to the Love Part"	Writer
2003	Clay Aiken	Measure of a Man	RCA	"This Is the Night"	Writer
2003	Clay Aiken	Measure of a Man	RCA	"Run To Me"	Writer
2003	Clay Aiken	Measure of a Man	RCA	"Invisible"	Writer
2003	S Club 7	Best: The Greatest Hits of S Club 7	Polydor	"Say Goodbye"	Writer
2002	Will Young	From Now On	Syco Music	"Anything Is Possible"	Writer
2001	S Club 7	Sunshine	Parlophone Records	"Have You Ever"	Writer
2001	Victoria Beckham	Victoria Beckham	Virgin Records	"I O U"	Writer
2001	Rick Astley	Keep It Turned On	Polydor	"Sleeping"	Writer/Producer
2001	Emma Bunton	A Girl Like Me	Virgin Records	"Spell It O.U.T"	Writer
2001	Emma Bunton	A Girl Like Me	Virgin Records	"Been There, Done That"	Writer
2001	Glenn Tilbrook	The Incomplete Glenn Tilbrook	Quixotic Records	"Parallel World"	Writer
2001	Glenn Tilbrook	The Incomplete Glenn Tilbrook	Quixotic Records	"Morning"	Writer
2001	Brian Kennedy	Get on with Your Short Life	Sony Music	"Get on with Your Short Life"	Writer
1999	Brian Kennedy	Now That I Know What I Want	19 recordings	"Now That I Know What I Want"	Writer
1996	Cathy Dennis	"Am I the Kinda Girl?"	Polydor	"Run Like a River"	Writer

== Recording artist ==
In 1993, Braide recorded his first solo album Chapter One - Chris Braide for Polydor Records. The album was produced by Thomas Dolby and Simply Red's Mick Hucknall. In 2014, the album was remastered and released in the UK on Plane Groovy Records

In 1996, Dave Stewart signed Braide to his Warner Bros.-backed label Anxious Records, who released a single co-written with Chris Difford, "If I Hadn't Got You", and second single "Heavenly Rain", followed a year later by the album, Life in a Minor Key, which was co-produced by Braide and David A. Stewart at Electric Lady Studios in New York. The record was released in the US on Atlantic Records and in 2013 a vinyl version was released on Plane Groovy Records.

In 2012, Braide teamed up with Geoff Downes under the name "DBA" ("Downes Braide Association"). The result was an album, Pictures of You, released in Summer 2012 on Plane Groovy Records. Since then, they have released five more studio recordings (Suburban Ghosts in 2015, Skyscraper Souls in 2017, Halcyon Hymns in 2021, Celestial Songs in September 2023 and Trauma appeared in September 2026). A live album (Live in England was released in 2019).

== Filmography ==
Braide wrote, performed or produced songs on the following film soundtracks:

- The Princess Diaries (2002)
- Without a Paddle (2004)
- St Trinian's (2007)
- The Inbetweeners Movie (2011)
- The Great Gatsby (2013)
- Youth (2015)
- Leap (2016)
- Miss Peregrine's Home for Peculiar Children (2016)
- Fifty Shades Darker (2017)
- Wonder Woman (2017)
- Gnome Alone (2017)
- Charming (2018)
- Vox Lux (2018)
- Duck Duck Goose (2018)
- Trouble (2021)
- Sneaks (2025)

== Advertising campaigns ==
He wrote, performed or produced songs in the following advertising campaigns:

- Bud Light – Aluminium Super Bowl – 10 ft Tall ft Wrabel (2014)
- Gillette – Unstoppable/Pretty Isn't Perfect/ Rio Olympic Games (2016)
- Pocky Sticks – Rescue – Yuna (2016)
- Estee Lauder ft Kendall Jenner and Elle King / Wild Love (2017)
- Estee Lauder – See the world with wide-open eyes – It's You ft Magical Thinker and Wrabel (2017)
- MAC – Helium / Guetta Re-mix (2018)
- Lancome Paris/ Zendaya ft Sia "Unstoppable" (2019)
- Samsung Galaxy Sia "Unstoppable" (2022)
