= Kyle Patrick (EP) =

EP by Kyle Patrick
- Released: July 20, 2012
- Recorded: 2011–2012
- Genre: Pop; indie pop
- Length: 16:20
- Label: Self-released
- Producer: Jared Scharff; Kyle Patrick

Kyle Patrick chronology
KP (2010)	Kyle Patrick (2012)

Singles from Kyle Patrick
- 1. "Go For Gold!" Released: June 20, 2012

Kyle Patrick is the second EP by American singer-songwriter Kyle Patrick. It was released independently on July 20, 2012, and was distributed through Warner Music Asia.

"Go For Gold!" has been involved in the London Olympics, and has been played on radio in countries such as Singapore, Malaysia and Indonesia.

== Background and release ==
In June 2011, Patrick launched a PledgeMusic campaign to raise funds for his upcoming EP. He performed shows in Southeast Asia to promote his solo work, which he hope to have an official release for it in May 2012. He wrote the song "Go For Gold" during a marathon training for the 2011 New York City Marathon. He had been working the EP for five years. He described the EP as "pop, anthemic, uplifting, fun, dream and Olympic." "Baby Don't Board That Plane" was written circa 2009.

On June 20, 2012, Patrick premiered the EP's lead single "Go For Gold". The song was used in London Olympics commercials in Singapore. The EP was released online via PledgeMusic on July 19, 2012, exclusively to fans who had pledged for Patrick's exclusives. It was officially released on Bandcamp and the iTunes Store on July 20, 2012. The song "Follow Your Heartbeat" won the Best Pop Song award at the 2013 Independent Music Awards.

== Critical reception ==
Professional ratings
Review scores
Source	Rating
Melodic	3.5/5 stars

Johan Wippsson of Melodic gave the EP a positive review stating, "It's a little less power-pop though as he has moved towards a more danceable and electronic sound... this EP should create a great interest among major labels as he has great potential and deserves to be a big name."

== Track listing ==
No.	Title	Composer(s)	Length
1.	"Follow Your Heartbeat"	Kyle Patrick, Jared Scharff, Nate Campany, Jesse Ruben, Teddy Geiger, Andrew "Broadway" Williams	3:04
2.	"Go For Gold!"	Kyle Patrick, Nate Campany, Jared Scharff, Benjamin Romans, Ruben, Billy Justineau	3:17
3.	"Wild Ways"	Jared Scharff, Andrew "Broadway" Williams	3:41
4.	"Baby Don't Board That Plane"	Kyle Patrick, Ruben	3:42
5.	"Ain't No Sunshine"	Bill Withers	2:36

== Personnel ==
Credits adapted from AllMusic and Bandcamp.

- Kyle Patrick – vocals, composer, lyricist, executive producer, arranger, drums, acoustic guitar, hammond B3, omnichord, piano, synthesizer, wurlitzer
- Miles Walker – mixing
- James Kang – mixing assistant
- Jared Blake Scharff – producer

== Release history ==
Release formats for Kyle Patrick
Region	Date	Format(s)	Label	Ref.
Various	July 20, 2012	CD; digital download; streaming	Self-released	
