= Jenny (The Click Five song) =

Single by the Click Five

from the album Modern Minds and Pastimes
- Released: April 10, 2007
- Genre: Power pop; pop rock
- Length: 3:23
- Label: Lava; Atlantic; WEA International
- Songwriters: Ben Romans; Jez Ashurst; Chris Braide
- Producer: Mike Denneen

The Click Five singles chronology
"Catch Your Wave" (2005)	"Jenny" (2007)	"Happy Birthday" (2007)

Music video
- "Jenny" on YouTube

"Jenny" is a song by American power pop band the Click Five. It was released on April 10, 2007, as the first single from their second studio album Modern Minds and Pastimes. The song was written by Ben Romans with Jez Ashurst of UK band Farrah and Chris Braide, while production was handled by Mike Denneen. The song was ranked at number 82 on MTV Asia's list of Top 100 Hits of 2007.

== Background ==
On April 10, 2007, "Jenny" was released via iTunes as the lead single from the band's second studio album Modern Minds and Pastimes. It was later released to contemporary hit radio. In an interview with Songfacts, Romans stated about the origin of the song's title: "'Jenny' is just a name. A name that scans well in songs," adding: "A lot of people are like, 'Okay, who's Jenny?' It's more a representation of anyone being fickle." There have been several rumors suggesting that the song is referencing a possible friendship between the band and South Korean singer Park Bom whose English name is Jenny due to them both attending the Berklee College of Music together. In 2016, the band's former lead vocalist Kyle Patrick said in response to the rumors circulating the song on Twitter: "We may never know the truth."

== Critical reception ==
Chad Grischow of IGN said of the song, "The distant chugging riffs and ultra-catchy melody turn 'Jenny' into a power pop gem, despite the syrupy new wave synth blaring throughout." Stephen Thomas Erlewine of AllMusic described the track as "a fantastic neo-Weezer pop tune. This is genuinely fun pop, a ray of sunshine... the Click Five work an '80s revivalism that's big on texture but not hooks." The song received heavy rotation on Singapore radio stations.

== Awards and nominations ==
Awards and nominations for "Jenny"
Year	Organization	Award	Result	Ref(s)
2007	Boston Music Awards	Song of the Year	Nominated	
2008	Myx Music Awards	Favorite International Music Video	Nominated	

== Music video ==
The music video for "Jenny" premiered via MTV on July 3, 2007, and was directed by the Aggressive. It was shot sometime between April and May 2007. It was uploaded on the Atlantic Records YouTube channel on October 26, 2009. The video reached number three on the MYX International Top 20 countdown.

== Track listing ==
Digital download
No.	Title	Length
1.	"Jenny"	3:23

Digital download – International single
No.	Title	Length
1.	"Jenny"	3:23
2.	"So It Goes"	2:33
3.	"Summertime"	2:38

== Personnel ==
Credits for "Jenny" adapted from album's liner notes.

The Click Five

- Kyle Patrick – lead vocals, rhythm guitar
- Joe Guese – lead guitar, backing vocals
- Ben Romans – synthesizers, backing vocals
- Ethan Mentzer – bass, backing vocals
- Joey Zehr – drums, percussion, backing vocals

Production

- Mike Denneen – producer, engineer
- Andy Vandette – mastering
- Mike Shipley – mixing

== Charts ==
=== Weekly charts ===
Weekly chart performance for "Jenny"
Chart (2007)	Peak position
Indonesia (ASIRI)	1
Philippines (IFPI)	1
Singapore (RIAS)	1
Taiwan (G-Music)	1

=== Year-end charts ===
Year-end chart performance for "Jenny"
Chart (2007)	Position
Singapore Airplay (Mediacorp)	15
Taiwan (Hito Radio)	96

== Release history ==
Release history and formats for "Jenny"
Region	Date	Format	Label	Ref.
Various	April 10, 2007	Digital download	Atlantic	
United States	May 1, 2007	Contemporary hit radio	Atlantic	
