= Catch Your Wave =

Single by the Click Five

from the album Greetings from Imrie House
- Released: November 8, 2005
- Recorded: 2005
- Genre: Rock; power pop
- Length: 2:52
- Label: Lava
- Songwriters: Ben Romans; Joe Guese; Ethan Mentzer
- Producer: Mike Denneen

The Click Five singles chronology
"Just the Girl" (2005)	"Catch Your Wave" (2005)	"Jenny" (2007)

Music video
- "Catch Your Wave" on YouTube

"Catch Your Wave" is a song by American power pop band the Click Five. It was released on November 8, 2005, as the second single from their debut studio album Greetings from Imrie House. The song peaked at number 37 on the US Pop Airplay chart.

== Background and composition ==
"Catch Your Wave" was released as a single and serviced to contemporary hit radio on November 8, 2005. The digital release was released on November 22, and contains a cover of Til Tuesday's "Voices Carry". The track was written by Ben Romans, Joe Guese and Ethan Mentzer, while production was handled by Mike Denneen.

== Live performances ==
The group performed the song on MTV Live in July 2005. The band also appeared at the 2005 MLS Cup half-time show where they performed the song. They performed at Macy's Thanksgiving Day Parade in November 2005, playing the track.

== Critical reception ==
Billboard gave the song a positive review writing, "Witty, metaphorically blissful lyrics are blended with guitar-driven hooks and lush harmonies, a perfect recipe to quench pop-parched airwaves," as well as noting, "This flawless pop gem, [taken from the quintet's Greetings From Imrie House], is sure to follow in the footsteps of previous top 20 'Just the Girl'."

== Chart performance ==
"Catch Your Wave" debuted on the US Pop Airplay chart at number 40 for the week ending December 24, 2005. The song later peaked at number 37. It also reached number 68 on the US Pop 100 chart. It was one of the most added songs on contemporary hit radio in Canada, in November 2005. In Singapore, the song spent two weeks at number one on their Top 10 Radio chart.

The song did not perform as well as their first single "Just the Girl". In response, singer Eric Dill stated, "Maybe people don't like the song as much. The holidays are a part of it. And radio is weird itself. Having been around it for now a year solid of visiting places and trying to learn about it, it's a very arbitrary thing. It doesn't necessarily represent as much as it could."

== Music video ==
The music video for "Catch Your Wave" premiered on November 7, 2005, via MTV. It was directed by Vem. The video debuted on the top ten on the MTV Total Request Live countdown.

== Track listing ==
CD single
No.	Title	Length
1.	"Catch Your Wave"	2:52

Digital download
No.	Title	Length
1.	"Catch Your Wave" (album version)	2:52
2.	"Voices Carry" (main version)	3:53

== Personnel ==
Credits for "Catch Your Wave" adapted from album's liner notes.

The Click Five

- Eric Dill – lead vocals, rhythm guitar
- Joe Guese – lead guitar, backing vocals
- Ben Romans – synthesizers, backing vocals
- Ethan Mentzer – bass, backing vocals
- Joey Zehr – drums, percussion, backing vocals

Production

- Mike Denneen – producer, mixing, engineer
- Wayne Sharp – executive producer
- Andy Vandette – mastering
- Matt Beaudoin – recording
- Matt Tahaney – assistant engineering

== Charts ==
Chart performance for "Catch Your Wave"
Chart (2006)	Peak position
US Bubbling Under Hot 100 (Billboard)	8
US Mainstream Top 40 (Billboard)	37
US Pop 100 (Billboard)	68

== Release history ==
Release history and formats for "Catch Your Wave"
Region	Date	Format	Label	Ref.
United States	November 8, 2005	Contemporary hit radio	Atlantic	
Various	November 22, 2005	Digital download	Atlantic	
