= TCV =

TCV or T.C.V. may refer to:

- TCV (album), an album of The Click Five, an American power pop band
- TCV (investment firm) (Technology Crossover Ventures), an American venture capital firm based in Menlo Park, California
- Temperature control valve
- Terminus Centre-Ville, a public transit hub in Montreal, Quebec, Canada
- The Conservation Volunteers, a British environmental charity
- Them Crooked Vultures, a supergroup
- Tibetan Children's Villages, an Indian charity for the care and education of children from Tibet
- Timecode Vinyl, as used with vinyl emulation software
- Today's Chinese Version, a translation of the Bible
- Tokamak à configuration variable, a research nuclear fusion reactor in Lausanne, Switzerland
- Total Contract Value, a measurement used in project management
- Turnip crinkle virus, a species of virus
