= Just the Girl =

2005 single by the Click Five

Single by the Click Five

from the album Greetings from Imrie House
- Released: May 31, 2005
- Genre: Power pop; pop-punk
- Length: 3:51
- Label: Lava
- Songwriter: Adam Schlesinger
- Producer: Mike Denneen

The Click Five singles chronology
"Angel to You (Devil to Me)" (2005)	"Just the Girl" (2005)	"Catch Your Wave" (2005)

Music video
- "Just the Girl" on YouTube

"Just the Girl" is a song by American rock band the Click Five. It was released on May 31, 2005, as the first single from their debut studio album, Greetings from Imrie House (2005). The band formed in Boston and were managed by talent scout Wayne Sharp, who assisted in signing the band to Lava Records. "Just the Girl" was composed by songwriter Adam Schlesinger, best-known for his work with Fountains of Wayne, as well as his career in film and television.

The single was the band's biggest mainstream hit, achieving heavy airplay on top 40 radio in the United States. It reached number 11 on the U.S. Billboard Hot 100. For Schlesinger, it was his highest-charting effort. The song received positive reviews from critics. In 2018, the song was ranked fifty-fifth by Billboard in their compilation of the 100 Greatest Boyband Songs of All Time.

== Background ==
The pop-rock quintet the Click Five emerged from Boston in the early 2000s. Their manager was Wayne Sharp, a talent scout with a background in jazz. Sharp had previously attempted to form a radio-ready pop outfit two decades prior with Candy, and styled the Click Five with identical suits and mod haircuts. The group signed to major label Lava Records in 2004, touring in support of singer Ashlee Simpson. Afterward, the band began recording their debut LP, Greetings from Imrie House, with producer Mike Denneen. The engineer had previously worked with power-pop band Fountains of Wayne, producing their 2003 hit album Welcome Interstate Managers.

"Just the Girl" was supplied to the group by that band's bassist, songwriter Adam Schlesinger, also-known for writing the title song to the 1996 film That Thing You Do!, which coincidentally also centered on The Wonders, a manufactured band "designed to generate Beatlemania-type hysteria." The band were fans of Fountains of Wayne, commenting in an interview that they were essentially "handed" the "unreleased Fountains of Wayne song."

== Chart performance ==
"Just the Girl" debuted at number 83 on the Billboard Hot 100 the week of July 30, 2005. Two weeks later, it moved sixteen spots from number 68 to number 52 the week of August 13, 2005. It reached the top 40 on the week of August 20, 2005, moving thirty-one spots to number 21. It peaked at number 11 the week of September 3, 2005 and stayed there for two weeks, remaining on the chart for twenty weeks.

The song also reached number one on the Digital Song Sales chart. The song spent two weeks at number one, before falling to the ninth spot on its eighth week on chart. It became the No. 1 most-downloaded song on iTunes for over 2 weeks, leading to a RIAA platinum certification as a Digital Single. For Schlesinger, it was the highest-charting single of his career.

== Reception ==
Professional ratings
Review scores
Source	Rating
About.com	4/5 stars

Initial reviews of the song were positive. Billboard contributor Chuck Taylor considered it reminiscent of boy-band LFO, dubbing it "just tough enough to be cool, but power poppy enough to have the braces crowd bellowing in unison." Jessica Grose of Spin viewed the band's debut, Greetings from Imrie House, as banal and manufactured, but singled out "Just the Girl" as the "only palatable song [...] and that's because Click Five didn't write it." Bill Lamb of About.com said of the song, "The bassline and 80's-ish keyboard backing gives more than a faint echo of the Cars, and it's a pleasant memory... The only question is whether it's all just a bit too manufactured." Journalist Nekesa Mumbi Moody of Today.com, felt the songs from their debut album "seem designed for teens with high-school crushes and breakups," highlighting "Just the Girl", where "lead singer Eric Dill croons, 'When she sees it's me, on her caller ID, she won’t pick up the phone, she'd rather be alone'."

After Schlesinger's passing, Tom Breihan at Stereogum described the song as a "processed, professional, infectious teen-longing jam that evoked the Cars and Ashlee Simpson at the same time." Evan Sawdey from PopMatters similarly viewed the track as full of hooks but cringe-inducing all the same. Songwriter Sam Hollander praised the tune as among Schlesinger's best, "brilliantly crafted" and evoking the great "power pop songbook". In a New Yorker piece examining Schlesinger's "incandescent" skill at songwriting, critic Jody Rosen included it among his best: "cleverness is on display in all [of Schlesinger's collaborations], but the songs are never mere exercises in style. They’re always full of feeling and ideas. They're always a little weird."

In Rolling Stone's article of the "50 Best One-Hit Wonders of the 2000s," writer Maura Johnson wrote, "Goopy synthesizers, 'ahh-ahh' backing vocals, and lead singer Eric Dill's loopy vocal give just the right candy coating to this besotted track's power-popping center." Similarly, Billboard described the track as a "power pop gem" and noted that "anyone watching Disney Channel during the year 2005 was undoubtedly obsessed with it," listing the song as the fifty-fifth "100 Greatest Boy Band Songs of All Time."

== Awards and nominations ==
Awards and nominations for "Just the Girl"
Year	Organization	Award	Result	Ref(s)
2005	Boston Music Awards	Song of the Year	Nominated	

=== Accolades ===
Accolades for "Just the Girl"
Publication	Country	Accolade	Year	Rank	Ref.
About.com	United States	Top 100 Songs of 2005	2005	15	

== Music video ==
The music video for "Just the Girl" premiered on June 21, 2005, via MTV. Directed by Paul Hunter & Vem Miller (aka Vem of Vem & Troy), the video features the band arriving on the roof of the fictional Paul Stanley Preparatory High School ("Home of the Fighting Starchildren"), named after Kiss frontman Paul Stanley, via helicopter, with the students passing a note saying that the band is performing on said roof and leaving their classrooms to watch them perform. Then-couple Christopher Knight and Adrianne Curry appear in the video as a teacher named Mr. Denneen, a nod to the band's producer Mike Denneen, and one of his students who has braided pigtails, respectively. The video reached number three on MTV's program Total Request Live. It also reached the top ten on the MYX International Top 20 countdown.

== Charts ==
=== Weekly charts ===
Weekly chart performance for "Just the Girl"
Chart (2005–2006)	Peak position
Canada CHR/Pop Top 30 (Radio & Records)	29
Singapore Airplay (Mediacorp)	4
US Billboard Hot 100	11
US Adult Contemporary (Billboard)	37
US Mainstream Top 40 (Billboard)	18
US Pop 100 (Billboard)	8

=== Year-end charts ===
Year-end chart performance for "Just the Girl"
Chart (2005)	Position
US Billboard Hot 100	89
US Mainstream Top 40 (Billboard)	67
US Pop 100 (Billboard)	63

== Certifications ==
Certifications and sales for "Just the Girl"
Region	Certification	Certified units/sales
United States (RIAA)	Gold	500,000^{*}
^{*} Sales figures based on certification alone.

== Release history ==
Release dates and formats for "Just the Girl"
Region	Date	Format(s)	Label(s)	Ref.
Various	May 31, 2005	Digital download	Lava; WEA International	
United States	June 13, 2005	Contemporary hit radio	Lava; Atlantic	
