= Flipside (The Click Five song) =

Single by the Click Five

from the album Modern Minds and Pastimes
- Released: May 2008
- Genre: Power pop; rock
- Length: 3:07
- Label: Lava Records; Atlantic Records; WEA International
- Songwriters: Ben Romans; Carl Falk; Kristian Lundin
- Producer: Mike Denneen

The Click Five singles chronology
"Empty" (2007)	"Flipside" (2008)	"I Quit, I Quit, I Quit" (2009)

"Flipside" is a song by American power pop band the Click Five. It was released in May 2008 as the fourth and final single from their second studio album Modern Minds and Pastimes (2007). It was released as a single for digital download-only in South-East Asia.

== Release ==
"Flipside" was first posted to MySpace on June 13, 2007, along with "Headlight Disco" as a promotional single, ahead of the release of their second studio album Modern Minds and Pastimes. It was later released as a single in May 2008, exclusively to South-East Asia.

== Composition ==
"Flipside" was written by Ben Romans, Carl Falk and Kristian Lundin, while production was handled by Mike Denneen. Musically, the song is described as rock, as well as having some post-grunge influences, drawing comparison to Weezer's Pinkerton.

== Critical reception ==
Colin McGuire of PopMatters stated, "the song as a whole is more pleasant than anything... And while it still may not feel sincere, the chorus is assured to be stuck in your head for days to follow." Entertainment Weekly described the track as "propulsive."

== Personnel ==
Credits for "Flipside" adapted from album's liner notes.

The Click Five

- Kyle Patrick – lead vocals, rhythm guitar
- Joe Guese – lead guitar, backing vocals
- Ben Romans – synthesizers, backing vocals
- Ethan Mentzer – bass, backing vocals
- Joey Zehr – drums, percussion, backing vocals

Additional musicians

- Mike Denneen – keyboards
- Matt Tahaney – backing vocals
- John Powhida – backing vocals
- Aaron Lippert – backing vocals

Production

- Mike Denneen – producer, engineer
- Andy Vandette – mastering
- Mike Shipley – mixing

== Charts ==
Chart performance for "Flipside"
Chart (2008)	Peak position
Singapore Airplay (Mediacorp)	10
