= Happy Birthday (The Click Five song) =

Single by the Click Five

from the album Modern Minds and Pastimes
- Released: October 2007
- Genre: Pop-punk
- Length: 3:29
- Label: Lava Records; Atlantic Records; WEA International
- Songwriter(s): Ben Romans; Jez Ashurst; Chris Braide
- Producer(s): Mike Denneen

The Click Five singles chronology
"Jenny" (2007)	"Happy Birthday" (2007)	"Empty" (2007)

"Happy Birthday" is a song by American power pop band the Click Five. It was released as the second single for Thailand and the Philippines in October 2007, and the third single for Singapore and Malaysia in January 2008, from their second studio album Modern Minds and Pastimes.

== Background ==
The song is about a guy apologizing after forgetting an ex's birthday and confessing to missing them. The song reached number one on Singapore's 987FM radio station.

== Composition ==
"Happy Birthday" was written by Ben Romans, Jez Ashurst and Chris Braide, while production was handled by Mike Denneen. The track is described as pop punk, with its guitar parts of a pop metal sound.

== Critical reception ==
Stephen Thomas Erlewine of AllMusic described the track as "over-stuffed yet sleek." Chad Grischow of IGN stated, "The heavy thrust of riffs in the hook turn the otherwise breezy belated 'Happy Birthday' into a potential earworm." Colin McGuire of PopMatters said its "simplicity would normally suggest watered-down cheese at first glance, a second look finds that the song's endearing qualities override anything else, making the track somewhat cute."

== Music video ==
The music video for "Happy Birthday" was released on December 17, 2007. The video was filmed during their tour in Asia. According to Kyle Patrick, after receiving positive responses from the audience, they were "so enthralled with the spirit of Asia as a whole that we wanted to do something with it."

== Personnel ==
Credits for "Happy Birthday" adapted from album's liner notes.

The Click Five

- Kyle Patrick – lead vocals, rhythm guitar
- Joe Guese – lead guitar, backing vocals
- Ben Romans – synthesizers, backing vocals
- Ethan Mentzer – bass, backing vocals
- Joey Zehr – drums, percussion, backing vocals

Additional musicians

- Mike Denneen – keyboards
- Matt Tahaney – backing vocals
- John Powhida – backing vocals
- Aaron Lippert – backing vocals

Production

- Mike Denneen – producer, engineer
- Andy Vandette – mastering
- Mike Shipley – mixing

== Charts ==
=== Weekly charts ===
Weekly chart performance for "Happy Birthday"
Chart (2008)	Peak position
Singapore Airplay (Mediacorp)	1

=== Year-end charts ===
Year-end chart performance for "Happy Birthday"
Chart (2008)	Position
Singapore Airplay (Mediacorp)	46

== Release history ==
Release dates and formats for "Happy Birthday"
Region	Date	Format	Label	Ref.
Thailand	October 2007	Contemporary hit radio	WEA International	
Philippines	October 2007	Contemporary hit radio	WEA International	
Malaysia	March 2008	Contemporary hit radio	WEA International	
Singapore	March 2008	Contemporary hit radio	WEA International	

== See also ==
- List of birthday songs
