= Angel to You (Devil to Me) =

Single by The Click Five

from the album Greetings from Imrie House
- Released: April 25, 2005
- Length: 3:29
- Label: Lava
- Songwriter(s): Ben Romans; Paul Stanley
- Producer(s): Mike Denneen

The Click Five singles chronology
"Angel to You (Devil to Me)" (2005)	"Just the Girl" (2005)

The Click Five EP chronology
Angel to You (Devil to Me) (2005)	Live at Bull Moose (2006)

"Angel to You (Devil to Me)" is a song by American rock band the Click Five. It was released on April 25, 2005, as the group's debut single. It was released as an EP featuring two other tracks, "Pop Princess" and "Say Goodnight". All three songs also appear on the band's debut studio album, Greetings from Imrie House.

== Background ==
After signing with Lava Records in late 2004, the band released a three-track EP, Angel to You (Devil to Me) on April 25, 2005. The EP contains the title track, "Pop Princess" and "Say Goodnight", which ended up selling 10,000 copies.

== Composition ==
"Angel to You (Devil to Me)" was written by Ben Romans and Kiss frontman Paul Stanley, while production was handled by Mike Denneen. According to lead guitarist Joe Guese, the collaboration came when they met Stanley at a Thanksgiving dinner in 2003. They were finishing up writing songs for Greetings from Imrie House, when someone came up with the idea of Romans writing a song with Stanley. The band's touring manager knew Stanley and he expressed interest in working with the group. Romans flew out to Los Angeles to work with Stanley and it was written in his home studio. The song also features Elliot Easton of the Cars, who played the guitar solo on the track.

== Track listing ==
CD single
No.	Title	Length
1.	"Angel to You (Devil to Me)"	3:29
2.	"Pop Princess"	4:19
3.	"Say Goodnight"	4:50
Total length:		12:39

== Personnel ==
Credits for "Angel to You (Devil to Me)" adapted from album's liner notes.

The Click Five

- Eric Dill – lead vocals, rhythm guitar
- Joe Guese – lead guitar, backing vocals
- Ben Romans – keyboards, synthesizers, backing vocals
- Ethan Mentzer – bass guitar, backing vocals
- Joey Zehr – drums, percussion, backing vocals

Additional musicians

- Elliot Easton – guitar
- John Powhida – backing vocals

Production

- Mike Denneen – producer, engineering, mixing
- Andy VanDette – mastering
- Matt Beaudoin – engineering
- Matt Tahaney – assistant engineering
- Wayne Sharp – executive producer

== Charts ==
Chart performance for "Angel to You (Devil to Me)"
Chart (2005)	Peak position
US Hot Singles Sales (Billboard)	7

== Release history ==
Release history and formats for "Angel to You (Devil to Me)"
Region	Date	Format	Label	Ref.
Various	April 25, 2005	CD single	Lava	
