= Forever Is Not Enough =

Forever is Not Enough

Studio album by Eric Dill
- Released: November 20, 2012
- Studio: Barefoot (Los Angeles, CA)
- Genre: Pop rock
- Length: 52:46
- Label: Vigil Records
- Producer: Matt Radosevich

Eric Dill chronology
| Wherever You Are (2012) | Forever is Not Enough (2012) |

Singles from Forever is Not Enough
- 1. "War with the Wolves" Released: May 22, 2012; 2. "In My Head" Released: January 14, 2013

Forever is Not Enough is the debut studio album by American singer-songwriter and musician Eric Dill. It was released on November 20, 2012, via Vigil Records and distributed by CD Baby.

== Background ==
In 2007, Dill officially left The Click Five to pursue a solo career. He then wrote the song "No Surprise" which was intended to be released on his first album. However, he gave the song to Daughtry for their second studio album, Leave This Town. In 2008, he worked with songwriters Kara DioGuardi and David Hodges for the album, with plans for it to be released later that year via Atlantic Records. Dill later released demo tracks from the album to his MySpace page in July 2008. He released a music video to the song "Leaving You Lonely" on December 2, 2010. After a year of not releasing new music or his album that was expected to be released four years prior, he subsequently released an EP titled, Wherever You Are independently in 2012 and his debut full-length studio album later that year. Forever is Not Enough was officially released on November 20, 2012, via Vigil Records and distributed by CD Baby.

== Composition ==
Forever Is Not Enough is a pop, rock and alternative-influenced album. Songs from the album were written from 2007 to 2012. "Postcard From Hollywood" and "I'd Follow You" were the earliest songs written for the record. The album features an up-tempo rock sound, while maintaining a pop-friendly sound. The lead single "War with the Wolves", is a Michael Jackson-inspired track who Dill stated, was an influence to his music. The title track is described as a "powerful love song," which he wrote after an "accumulation of the way" he felt one night. He also described tracks such as "Leaving You Lonely" and "The End of Me and You" as mid-tempo rock songs. Other songs like "In My Head" feature a dance and electronic music sound.

== Release ==
On May 22, 2012, "War with the Wolves" was released as the lead single from Forever is Not Enough. The song was listed on the Billboard Top 40 Indicator Chart. He also performed the song "Mercy at Midnight" in May 2012, ahead of the album's release, which was also included in his Wherever You Are EP. He released a music video for the single in November 2012, and was featured on mtvU. "In My Head" was released as the second single from the album, which was released to radio on January 14, 2013. A music video for the song "Forever is Not Enough" was released on July 2, 2013.

== Critical reception ==
Professional ratings
Review scores
| Source | Rating |
|---|---|
| Melodic | 3.5/5 stars |

Johan Wippsson of Melodic gave the album a positive review stating, "Imagine a mixture Savage Garden and Thirty Seconds to Mars, and you get an album filled with epic melodies in an extremely catchy format. So it's more electronic than The Click Five and without any traces of their characteristic power-pop. But it is the same class and if you like pop/rock."

== Track listing ==
All tracks are written by Eric Dill, expect where noted

| No. | Title | Writer(s) | Length |
|---|---|---|---|
| 1. | "Shadows in the Dark" | Eric Dill; Matt Radosevich | 6:02 |
| 2. | "End of Me and You" | Dill; Rune Westberg | 3:52 |
| 3. | "The Girl Always Wins" | Dill; Radosevich | 3:09 |
| 4. | "War with the Wolves" | | 3:19 |
| 5. | "Wherever You Are" | PJ Bianco; Dill; Denise Rich | 4:18 |
| 6. | "Faith in Love" | | 4:03 |
| 7. | "Forever is Not Enough" | Dill; Radosevich | 4:32 |
| 8. | "I Will Come Back for You" | | 3:55 |
| 9. | "I'd Follow You" | | 4:03 |
| 10. | "In My Head" | Dill; Radosevich | 3:49 |
| 11. | "Leaving You Lonely" | Dill; Jon Mabe | 3:51 |
| 12. | "Mercy at Midnight" | Dill; Mabe | 3:58 |
| 13. | "Postcard From Hollywood" | Dill; Rune Westberg | 3:54 |
| Total length: | | | 52:46 |

== Release history ==
Release formats for Forever is Not Enough
| Region | Date | Format(s) | Label | Ref. |
|---|---|---|---|---|
| Various | November 20, 2012 | CD; digital download; streaming | Vigil Records | |
