= Modern Minds and Pastimes =

Studio album by The Click Five
- Released: June 26, 2007
- Recorded: 2006
- Studio: Q Division (Boston, MA)
- Genre: Power pop
- Length: 42:45
- Label: Lava; Atlantic; WEA International
- Producer: Mike Denneen

The Click Five chronology
| Greetings from Imrie House (2005) | Modern Minds and Pastimes (2007) | TCV (2010) |

Singles from Modern Minds and Pastimes
- 1. "Jenny" Released: April 10, 2007; 2. "Happy Birthday" Released: October 2007; 3. "Empty" Released: October 2007; 4. "Flipside" Released: May 2008

Modern Minds and Pastimes is the second studio album by The Click Five. It was released on June 26, 2007. The album contains four singles "Jenny", "Happy Birthday", "Empty" and "Flipside". The album reached number 136 in the Billboard 200. It is the first album with new lead vocalist Kyle Patrick, who replaced former frontman Eric Dill, leaving the band in November 2006.

In support of the album, the band toured with Hilary Duff in North America, and the Black Eyed Peas in Southeast Asia. They also embarked on a headlining tour called the Modern Minds and Great Times World Tour, in the spring of 2008.

== Background ==
Following the release of their debut studio album, Greetings from Imrie House (2005), the group's popularity began to fade. They began working on their second studio album in January 2006 and due to extensive touring, they only had "about half a record" done, pushing back its completion. While on tour, they debuted a new song titled "By the Way", which did not make it onto the album. It was recorded at Q Division Studios in Boston. In March 2007, the group announced the departure of original singer Eric Dill, who left the band on November 20, 2006. Dill left during pre-production for the album and pursued a solo career following his exit from the band. Bassist Ethan Mentzer spoke about his departure stating, "We either had to deal with this or lose what we'd established. And the four of us really wanted to keep making music together." Drummer Joey Zehr also said his exit was "a mutual thing" and that it wasn't a "harsh thing on either side."

Dill later revealed that he left the group, expressing an interest in acting, after shooting their film, Taking Five. He also left the band due to having musical differences with the other members, stating they "resisted" working on writing songs with him. However, Mentzer claimed that they were writing the songs and Dill wasn't. They began searching for a new lead vocalist at Berklee College of Music and did multiple rounds of auditions, before they were recommended Hillside Manor singer Kyle Patrick, who was suggested to them by music-business professor Jeff Dorenfeld, a friend of the band's manager Wayne Sharp. After checking his MySpace page, the group called Patrick to confirm his role with the band.

== Composition ==
Writing out 70 songs, the group narrowed down to 12 tracks for the album. Most of the album was written in the United Kingdom, which lead guitarist Joe Guese said had an influence to their sound. According to Mentzer, the band had written some songs for Modern Minds and Pastimes before their first album was even completed. Mentzer said that the band wrote more personal and autobiographical lyrics and said the album had "more depth and maturity." With Patrick joining the band, their sound also changed on the album, from power pop to alternative rock. Keyboardist and primary songwriter Ben Romans said of the change, "When Kyle came in, we got things done the way it should be." The opening track "Flipside" and "Jenny" contain influences of a post-grunge and fuzz-rock sound, to the liking of Weezer, while "Happy Birthday" features a pop metal sound. Kyle Patrick co-wrote "Empty" before joining the band. The fourth track "Addicted to Me" features a lot of synthesizers and draws influences from The Romantics and Tom Petty and The Heartbreakers, while the seventh track "Headlight Disco" is described as disco. According to Romans, the group wrote "Headlight Disco" to have more synthesizers than guitars, experimenting with that type of sound.

== Promotion ==
The album's lead single "Jenny", was released on April 10, 2007. Before the album's release, the band embarked on a mid-May tour to support its upcoming release. The group also posted two songs on MySpace, "Headlight Disco" and "Flipside" on June 13, 2007. The album was officially released on June 26. A music video for "Jenny" was released on July 3, 2007, and was directed by the Aggressive. The group embarked on a tour with Hilary Duff from August to September 2007, in support of the album. "Happy Birthday" and "Empty" were both released as singles in October 2007, in Thailand and the Philippines. From October to November 2007, the group joined the Black Eyed Peas on a tour in Southeast Asia, as well as headlining their own tour. In the spring of 2008, the band headlined their Modern Minds and Great Times World Tour. "Flipside" was released as the fourth and final single in May 2008.

== Critical reception ==
Professional ratings
Review scores
| Source | Rating |
|---|---|
| AllMusic | 3/5 stars |
| Entertainment Weekly | B− |
| IGN | 6.8/10 |
| Las Vegas Weekly | 3.5/5 stars |
| PopMatters | 3/10 stars |

The album was met with mixed reviews from music critics. Stephen Thomas Erlewine of AllMusic stated "the Click Five replaced their retro-rock leanings with retro-new wave flair -- a shameless attempt to follow fashion, but one that should be expected, even embraced, by a band that has nothing more than dreams of big hits in mind. If only the music on this second album, Modern Minds and Pastimes, were as big, tasteless and gaudy as the Click Five's career machinations! Part of the problem is that substituting the Killers for the Strokes means that the band relies too much on pumping wannabe anthems and layers of tongue-in-cheek retro-synths, which give the album a bit of a chilly distanced feel at odds with music designed to be teen trash, but also to be the group's strengths." Entertainment Weekly felt that the album "packs maximum velocity but not a lot of punch," finding the lovelorn lyrics "banal at best." Chad Grischow of IGN described the album as "an unfortunately uneven listen with enough catchy bubblegum pop to make it worth a listen, but not worth keeping the entire album on your iPod for long." Steven Ward of Las Vegas Weekly wrote, "The Click Five sing swirling and swooning harmonies like The Raspberries, play lippy keyboards like The Cars, rock hard when they have to Cheap Trick-style and deliver catchy hooks Marshall Crenshaw would envy."

Colin McGuire of PopMatters remarked, "the problem that runs rampant throughout the Click Five’s most recent disaster: insincerity. Songs like 'When I'm Gone' and 'The Reason Why' simply feel incredibly disingenuous. New lead singer Kyle Patrick's predictable voice never seems to present any of his new band's words with any type of consequential emotion or believability. And while '[When I'm] Gone' is a flat-out lame attempt at 'rocking', '[The Reason] Why' is nothing more than another manufactured boy-right-out-of-his-teens kind of likes girl-probably-still-in-her-teens enough to claim he is in love tune. And none of it seems honest."

=== Commercial performance ===
Modern Minds and Pastimes debuted at number 136 on the US Billboard 200. As of March 2009, the album sold 50,000 copies in the United States. The singles "Jenny", "Empty" and "Happy Birthday" reached number one on the Singapore 987FM Top 20 countdown.

== Track listing ==
Standard edition
| No. | Title | Writer(s) | Length |
|---|---|---|---|
| 1. | "Flipside" | Ben Romans, Kristian Lundin, Carl Falk | 3:07 |
| 2. | "Jenny" | Romans, Chris Braide | 3:22 |
| 3. | "Happy Birthday" | Romans, Braide | 3:29 |
| 4. | "Addicted to Me" | Romans, Ethan Mentzer | 4:08 |
| 5. | "I'm Getting Over You" | Romans, Mentzer, Braide | 3:20 |
| 6. | "When I'm Gone" | Romans, Mentzer | 2:59 |
| 7. | "Headlight Disco" | Romans, Mentzer | 3:41 |
| 8. | "The Reason Why" | Romans, Nate Campany | 3:40 |
| 9. | "All I Need Is You" | Romans, Mentzer, Campany | 3:22 |
| 10. | "Long Way to Go" | Mentzer | 3:43 |
| 11. | "Mary Jane" | Romans, Mentzer, Andreas Carlsson, Lisa Greene | 3:50 |
| 12. | "Empty" | Romans, Kyle Patrick | 4:01 |
| Total length: | | | 42:45 |

Japanese edition
| No. | Title | Length |
|---|---|---|
| 13. | "Summertime" | 2:38 |
| 14. | "Jenny" (acoustic version) | 3:18 |
| 15. | "Empty" (acoustic version) | 4:07 |
| Total length: | | 52:48 |

Tour edition and iTunes deluxe edition
| No. | Title | Length |
|---|---|---|
| 13. | "Summertime" | 2:38 |
| 14. | "So It Goes" | 2:33 |
| 15. | "American Royalty" | 2:51 |
| 16. | "Long Way to Go" (acoustic version) | 3:43 |
| 17. | "Mary Jane" (acoustic version) | 3:52 |
| 18. | "The Reason Why" (acoustic version) | 3:39 |
| Total length: | | 62:01 |

Tour edition DVD (CD only)
| No. | Title | Length |
|---|---|---|
| 1. | "Jenny" (karaoke music video) |
| 2. | "Behind the Band Part 1" |
| 3. | "Happy Birthday" (karaoke music video) |
| 4. | "Behind the Band Part 2" |
| 5. | "Empty" (karaoke music video) |
| 6. | "Behind the Band Part 3" |
| 7. | "Mary Jane" (promo version) |
| 8. | "Behind the Band Part 4" |
| 9. | "Jenny" (Acoustic Sessions) |
| 10. | "Behind the Band Part 5" |
| 11. | "Long Way to Go" (Acoustic Sessions) |
| 12. | "Mary Jane" (Acoustic Sessions) |
| 13. | "Empty" (live @ MOS Singapore) |
| 14. | "Headlight Disco" (live @ MOS Singapore) |

== Personnel ==
Credits for adapted from album's liner notes.

The Click Five

- Kyle Patrick – lead vocals, rhythm guitar
- Joe Guese – lead guitar, backing vocals
- Ben Romans – keyboards, backing vocals
- Ethan Mentzer – bass, backing vocals
- Joey Zehr – drums, percussion, backing vocals

Additional musicians

- Aaron Lippert – backing vocals
- Eric Espiritu – vocals
- Frank Ciampi – vocals
- Gavin McDevitt – vocals
- John Powhida – backing vocals
- Klara Osk Eliasdotta – vocals
- Matt Tahaney – backing vocals
- Mike Denneen – keyboards
- Wayne Sharp – handclapping

Production

- Mike Denneen – producer, engineering
- Andy VanDette – mastering
- Joe Tooley – engineering
- Kristen Smith – engineering
- Matt Beaudoin – engineering
- Matt Tahaney – engineering
- Mike Shipley – mixing
- Dane Venable – marketing
- Dave Scott – design
- Ed Valauskas – production coordination
- Elizabeth Attenborough – photography
- Jon Cohan – drum technician
- Mindy Ryun – design
- Pamela Littky – photography
- Wayne Sharp – executive producer

== Charts ==
Chart performance for Modern Minds and Pastimes
| Chart (2007) | Peak position |
|---|---|
| US Billboard 200 | 136 |

== Release history ==
Release history and formats for Modern Minds and Pastimes
| Region | Date | Format | Label | Ref. |
|---|---|---|---|---|
| Various | June 26, 2007 | CD; digital download | Atlantic; Lava | |
| Japan | December 5, 2007 | CD | WEA International | |
| Australia | May 3, 2008 | CD | Atlantic; Lava | |
| Hong Kong | June 3, 2008 | CD; DVD | Lava | |
| South Korea | June 3, 2008 | CD; DVD | Lava | |
