= The Incomplete Glenn Tilbrook =

Studio album by Glenn Tilbrook
- Released: 20 December 2001
- Studios: 45 RPM Studios, Blackheath, London
- Genres: Pop; Rock
- Label: What Are Records?
- Producers: Glenn Tilbrook; Andy Metcalfe

Glenn Tilbrook chronology
The Incomplete Glenn Tilbrook (2001)	Transatlantic Ping Pong (2014)

The Incomplete Glenn Tilbrook was the first solo release by lead singer of Squeeze Glenn Tilbrook. This album featured Tilbrook's first recordings of songs written without his fellow Squeeze member Chris Difford. (While Squeeze never recorded a solo Tilbrook composition, The Rumour did so in 1981.)

The album received mainly positive reviews from Squeeze fans. Initial copies of the UK release also contain a bonus acoustic recording titled The Completely Acoustic Glenn Tilbrook featuring in-studio, acoustic recordings of the album's content.

The album was produced by Glenn Tilbrook and Andy Metcalfe.

== Track listing ==
All tracks composed by Glenn Tilbrook; except where indicated

1. "This Is Where You Ain't"
2. "Observatory" (Aimee Mann, Tilbrook)
3. "Parallel World" (Chris Braide, Tilbrook)
4. "Morning" (Chris Braide, Tilbrook)
5. "One Dark Moment"
6. "G.S.O.H. Essential"
7. "Up the Creek"
8. "Other World" (Ben Jones)
9. "Interviewing Randy Newman"
10. "You See Me" (Ron Sexsmith, Tilbrook)
11. "I Won't See You" (Kim Stockwood, Tilbrook)
12. "We Went Thataway"
