= Greetings from Imrie House =

Studio album by the Click Five
- Released: August 8, 2005
- Recorded: 2005
- Genres: Power pop; pop rock; pop-punk; new wave; teen pop
- Length: 39:10
- Labels: Atlantic; Lava
- Producer: Mike Denneen

The Click Five chronology
Greetings from Imrie House (2005)	Modern Minds and Pastimes (2007)

Singles from Greetings from Imrie House
- 1. "Angel to You (Devil to Me)" Released: April 25, 2005 (EP) (Note: This release also included "Pop Princess" and "Say Goodnight", two songs that also appeared on the album.); 2. "Just the Girl" Released: May 31, 2005; 3. "Catch Your Wave" Released: November 8, 2005

Greetings from Imrie House is the debut studio album by American pop rock band the Click Five. It was released on August 8, 2005 and reached #15 on the U.S. Billboard 200. It contains the band's two biggest domestic chart hits, "Just the Girl" and "Catch Your Wave". Also included are "Angel to You (Devil to Me)", "Pop Princess", and "Say Goodnight", three songs that originally appeared on an EP named after the former song. It is the only album by the band to feature lead vocalist & rhythm guitarist Eric Dill, who left the band in 2007 prior to the production of their second studio album, Modern Minds and Pastimes.

== Background ==
Signing with Lava Records in late 2004, the band began recording their debut album with producer Mike Denneen. Along with the signing, they released "Just the Girl" for streaming via their website and "Pop Princess" for a free download. The album's title refers to the band's Boston house on Imrie Street where they lived while writing the album and attending Berklee School of Music. The album's musical style of "retro new wave and power pop" was inspired by Cheap Trick, the Beach Boys, and the Knack. Keyboardist Ben Romans described the record as "the love album" and said "We want to make people feel like they are falling in love and being heartbroken with us all at the same time." Adam Schlesinger of Fountains of Wayne and Paul Stanley of Kiss worked the band and helped co-write some tracks on the album. The album also features a cover of "Lies" by UK new wave band Thompson Twins. According to lead guitarist Joe Guese, the cover was recorded after the album was completed and was intended only for the Sky High soundtrack. However, the song was added at the last minute as the record label "thought it came out so cool." The song "Angel to You (Devil to Me)" features a guitar solo from Elliot Easton of the Cars. On June 7, 2005, the group announced the release date for the album, announcing it for release on August 16, 2005. However, its release date was pushed up for August 8, made available for digital download via iTunes. A month before the album's release, the group released E-cards online of each member, which was later packaged with the album. The band spent late 2005 and early 2006 touring with Ashlee Simpson, Alanis Morissette, the Backstreet Boys, Jesse McCartney and Big City Rock in support of the album.

== Singles ==
"Angel to You (Devil to Me)" was released on April 25, 2005, as the band's debut single. Originally released on the EP of the same name, it later appears on the album as the sixth track. The song peaked at number seven on the US Hot Singles Sales chart.

"Just the Girl" was released on May 31, 2005, as the album's lead single. The song became a commercial success, peaking at number 11. It also reached number one on the Digital Song Sales chart. The song received a gold certification by the Recording Industry Association of America (RIAA), with sales of 500,000 copies in the United States. The music video premiered on June 21, 2005, via MTV, and reached number three on Total Request Live.

"Catch Your Wave" was released on November 8, 2005, as the album's second and final single. The song peaked at number eight on the US Bubbling Under Hot 100 and at number 37 on the US Pop Airplay charts. The music video premiered on November 7, 2005.

Though it was not released as a single, a music video for "Say Goodnight" was released on April 19, 2006.

== Commercial performance ==
The album debuted on the Billboard 200 at number 15 on September 3, 2005, marking the highest-ranking debut for any pop or rock band that year, selling 51,541 copies. It was also the best debut in Lava Records' history. Billboard's Melinda Newman opined that the grassroots following the band had developed online responsible for the high debut. In its second week, the album dropped to number 28.

In an era of declining album sales, the band moved 268,000 copies of the album by January 2006, considered disappointing in comparison to the sales of lead single "Just the Girl". "Part of me likes the idea of being a singles band," said Joe Guese to Rolling Stone at the time. As of March 2009, the album has sold 350,000 copies in the United States. In Singapore, the album sold 2,000 copies.

== Reception ==
Professional ratings
Review scores
Source	Rating
About.com	4/5 stars
AllMusic	3.5/5 stars
Blender	3/5 stars
Entertainment Weekly	(B)
IGN	(0.2/10)
Melodic	4.5/5 stars
Rolling Stone	3/5 stars
USA Today	2.5/4 stars

Greetings from Imrie House received mixed to positive reviews. Rolling Stone's Barry Walters deemed the album and group "Simultaneously retro, current, mainstream-minded and knowing." Gary Susman of Entertainment Weekly called it "insanely catchy blend," combining "guitar crunch, pop hooks, and Queen-worthy vocal harmonies." John D. Luerssen of AllMusic predicted the band would be considered "disposable," while also attracting "instant acclaim" from other quarters. Bill Lamb of About.com stated, "Some tunes are indeed more catchy than others, but when the band really hits its stride on a Ben Romans original like 'Pop Princess', the world is a tuneful, happy place." Kaj Roth of Melodic said of the album, "Pop like the one on Greetings from Imrie house will always be timeless." Edna Gundersen of USA Today remarked, "this power-pop outfit's squeaky-clean production, catchy melodies and creamy harmonies can be deliciously addictive. Click may click with adolescent tastes, but ultimately the soulless grooves will leave musically mature palates craving something with more substance and bite." Writing for Today.com, journalist Nekesa Mumbi Moody criticized the album for its lack of distinctiveness, stating the songs "seem designed for teens with high-school crushes and breakups" and "is trip down memory lane that isn't worth taking."

Spin's Jessica Grose found the album "unbelievably derivative and banal," commenting, "The thought of the Click Five catering to legions of swooning tweens may be inevitable considering their tour partners, but you don't have to be part of the Click Five problem. You can be part of the solution." A reviewer for IGN was explicitly negative, describing the record at times "an aborted fetus" and "nauseatingly acrimonious," while also suggesting readers should instead download music from Leonard Cohen (misattributed as Joel Cohen), A Tribe Called Quest, and Can. Many music critics also criticized the group's cover of "Lies". Lamb described their cover as "uninspired" and "a glaring miscalculation." Heather Phares of AllMusic remarked, "the Click Five's remake of 'Lies' might be louder than the original, but it's not any better."

In 2015, MTV listed Greetings From Imrie House as one of six albums that "Perfectly Capture the State of Pop in 2005."

== Track listing ==
Standard edition
No.	Title	Writer(s)	Length
1.	"Good Day"	Ben Romans; Ethan Mentzer	3:09
2.	"Just the Girl"	Adam Schlesinger	3:54
3.	"Catch Your Wave"	Romans; Mentzer; Joe Guese	2:52
4.	"I'll Take My Chances"	Schlesinger; D. Scott	3:49
5.	"Friday Night"	Romans; Mentzer	3:31
6.	"Angel to You (Devil to Me)"	Romans; Paul Stanley	3:29
7.	"Resign"	Romans; Eric Dill	3:06
8.	"Pop Princess"	Romans	4:18
9.	"Time Machine"	Romans	3:14
10.	"Lies"	A. Bailey; J. Currie; M. Leeway	2:58
11.	"Say Goodnight"	Romans; N. Campany	4:50
Total length:			39:10

iTunes edition
No.	Title	Writer(s)	Length
12.	"Catch Your Wave" (live version)	Romans; Mentzer; Guese	4:25
Total length:			43:35

United Kingdom edition
No.	Title	Writer(s)	Length
10.	"I Think We're Alone Now"	Ritchie Cordell	2:55
11.	"Say Goodnight"	Romans; N. Campany	4:50
Total length:			39:07

Japanese edition
No.	Title	Writer(s)	Length
12.	"I Think We're Alone Now"	Ritchie Cordell	2:55
13.	"Just the Girl" (acoustic live version)	Schlesinger	3:52
14.	"Just the Girl" (music video)
15.	"Catch Your Wave" (music video)
Total length:			45:29

== Personnel ==
Credits adapted from album's liner notes.

The Click Five

- Eric Dill – lead and backing vocals, rhythm guitar
- Joe Guese – lead guitar, backing vocals
- Ben Romans – keyboards, synthesizers, backing vocals
- Ethan Mentzer – bass guitar, backing vocals
- Joey Zehr – drums, percussion, backing vocals

Additional musicians

- Elliot Easton – guitar
- John Powhida – backing vocals
- Larissa Scherer – backing vocals, cello
- Ruth Collins – violin

Production

- Mike Denneen – producer, engineering, mixing
- Andy VanDette – mastering
- Matt Beaudoin – engineering
- Aaron P. Simon – product manager
- Andrew Karp – A&R
- Carl Plaster – drum technician
- Christina Dittmar – art direction
- Dave Scott – design
- Don Rohr – A&R
- Elizabeth Attenborough – photography
- Scott Schafer – photography
- Wayne Sharp – executive producer

== Charts ==
Chart performance for Greetings from Imrie House
Chart (2005)	Peak position
US Billboard 200	15

== Release history ==
Release history and formats for Greetings from Imrie House
Region	Date	Format	Label	Ref.
United States	August 8, 2005	Digital download	Atlantic; Lava	
Various	August 16, 2005	CD; digital download	Atlantic; Lava	
Japan	June 21, 2006	CD	Atlantic; Lava	
United Kingdom	October 9, 2006	CD	Atlantic; Lava	
