= The Click Five =

American rock band

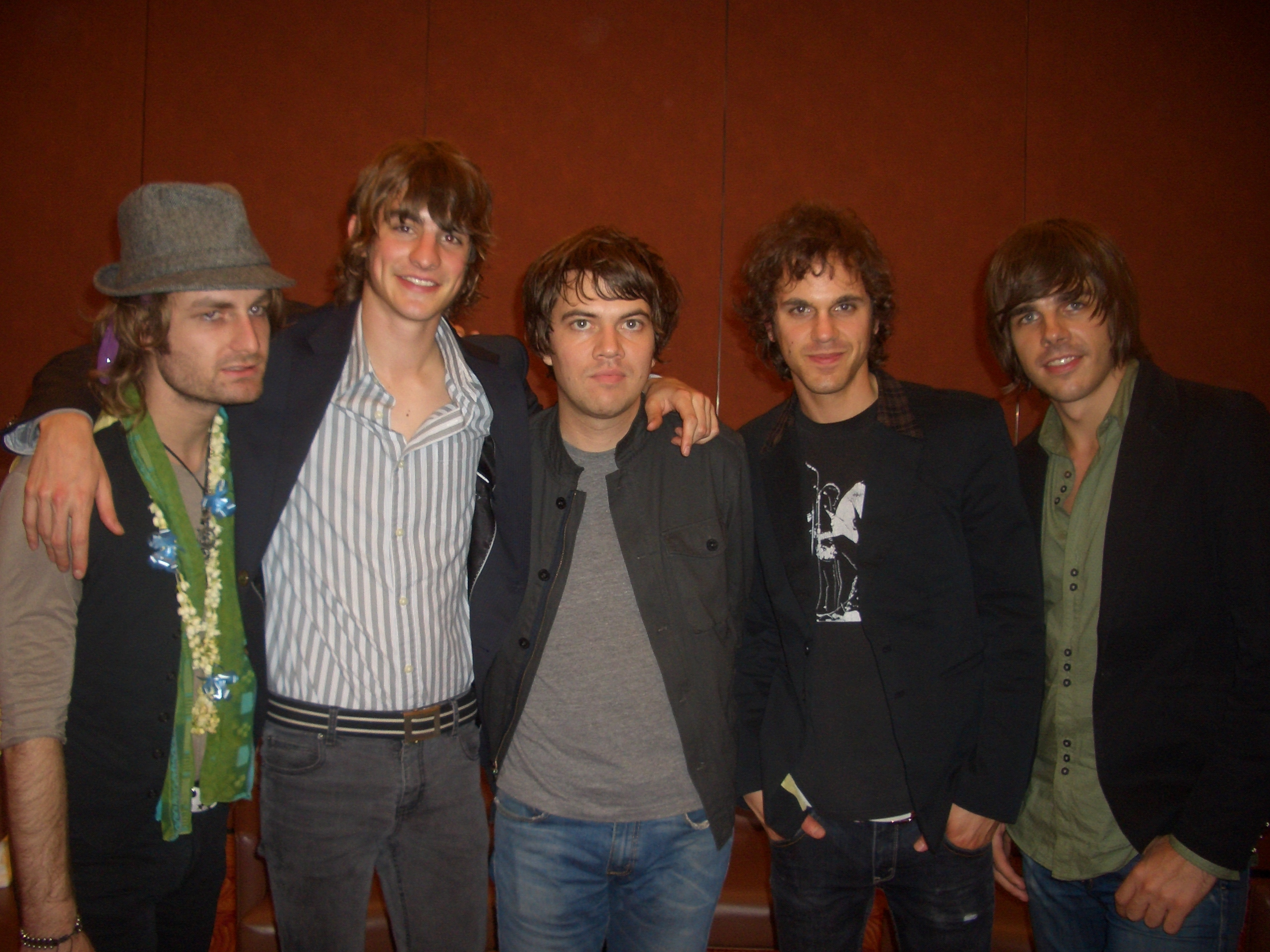
- The Click Five in 2008

Background information
- Origin: Boston, Massachusetts, United States
- Genres: Power pop; pop-punk; teen pop
- Years active: 2003–2013; 2025–present
- Labels: Atlantic; Lava; Lojinx
- Members: Kyle Patrick; Joe Guese; Ethan Mentzer
- Past members: Eric Dill; Ben Romans; Joey Zehr
- Website: www.theclickfive.com

The Click Five (often abbreviated as TC5) is an American rock band from Boston, Massachusetts. The original members, most of them students at Berklee College of Music, started on January 1, 2004, and played in various local venues. They then quickly got the attention of talent scout Wayne Sharp (who had worked with the power pop group Candy). The Click Five made their first recording, a two-song demo session, in early 2004 after successful local touring. They released their debut studio album Greetings from Imrie House in 2005. After vocalist Eric Dill left the group, he was replaced by Kyle Patrick who debuted on their second studio album Modern Minds and Pastimes in 2007. Their third studio album, TCV, was released in Asia in 2010 and to the rest of the world in early 2011. The group broke up in 2013. The band returned in 2025, embarking on the Click 2025 tour and performing at the Playback Music Festival.

The band was initially known for its power pop songs and for its mod-based public image, involving sharp-looking suits and ties coupled with moptop haircuts, which is deliberately reminiscent of the Beatles or the Dave Clark Five. They prefer to classify their music as "new school power pop". However, they have also been classified as pop punk and teen pop. They achieved significant commercial success with their first album in the US and their second release met with extreme popularity in Asian countries such as Cambodia and the Philippines. In total, the band has sold two million albums worldwide and have created eight number one singles in seven different nations. The band starred in the 2007 film Taking Five with Alona Tal, Daniella Monet, and Christy Carlson Romano.

== History ==
=== 2003–2004: Formation and early history ===
Ben Romans studied songwriting, Ethan Mentzer studied production and engineering, and Joey Zehr double majored in production/engineering and business at the Berklee College of Music. Roommates and close-friends Mentzer and Zehr moved to a place on Imrie Road in the neighborhood of Allston when they were both sophomores. Calling their place "Imrie House", they met with Romans and Joe Guese (whom Zehr once described as a "professional dropout") and formed a kind of pseudo-fraternity. The four played in various local bands, none of which had any success. However, they drew the attention of Wayne Sharp, a musical talent agent who had mostly worked in jazz although he had also worked with the mid-1980s power pop group Candy.

Romans went to work for a record company in Nashville. Jeff Dorenfeld, former manager of the band Boston, saw Guese and Mentzer performing in May 2003 and referred them to Sharp. Sharp liked their playing, but he had a low regard for their songs and their appearance. The first words Sharp ever said to them were "This isn't going to work unless you listen to me".

The four soon took in Eric Dill, a high-school friend of Zehr from when they both lived in Indianapolis. Zehr has said that they began playing seriously because "[w]hen we started the band our senior year, it was basically our last-ditch effort, because we all knew we were about to be done with school and have to enter the real world". They were all in their very early-20s. According to Zehr, the group would play several shows a week that were booked under different band names to get around local clubs' rules preventing artists from playing that close to each other. Their playing then got the attention of Mike Denneen, Boston-based producer of Fountains of Wayne, who agreed to help them produce a 2-song demo record. Denneen also introduced them to Kiss guitarist Paul Stanley, who was strongly supportive.

=== 2005–2006: Greetings From Imrie House ===
The Click Five made their demos at Imrie House itself, finishing in March 2004. Denneen believed that the group "sucked live" and pushed them to rehearse further. The program director at Kiss 108, the big Boston Top 40 station, liked it enough to book the group for the station's "Concert on the Charles" in mid-2004. They released their first EP, "Angel to You (Devil to Me)", on April 25, 2005. Principal songwriter Ben Romans collaborated with Paul Stanley in creating the song, and guitarist Elliot Easton, best known for his work in the Cars, played in it.

The group hired a lawyer and shopped around some of the major labels. A college scout from Epic Records who witnessed one of their shows convinced Epic to fly the group to Los Angeles to play. Lava Records, which was later folded into Atlantic Records, ended up signing the band in late 2004. They started with the label a mere month after their EP. According to The Boston Globe, "Click Five was launched into the pop-music stratosphere with the full force of the industry's muscle behind it." The band opened for Ashlee Simpson for the first time, a position that cost the label $25,000 and that one of their officials later called "the best money we've spent".

The group ended up selling about 10,000 copies of the EP. They then released "Just the Girl", written by label-mate Adam Schlesinger of Fountains of Wayne, to build up support for their debut album. It was met with commercial success, peaking at number 11 on the Billboard Hot 100. The song also took the number one spot on the US Digital Song Sales chart. They created a music video for the song in summer 2005, and it went up to number three on MTV's program Total Request Live. The song became the No. 1 most-downloaded song on iTunes for over 2 weeks, leading to a RIAA platinum certification as a Digital Single. They also toured extensively with Ashlee Simpson. They released their debut, Greetings From Imrie House, on August 8, 2005, which they named after the building where they had started. It featured another song by Schlesinger titled "I'll Take My Chances", in which Elliot Easton also played. The album also contained a cover version of "Lies" – a song which was a hit for UK pop band Thompson Twins in 1983.

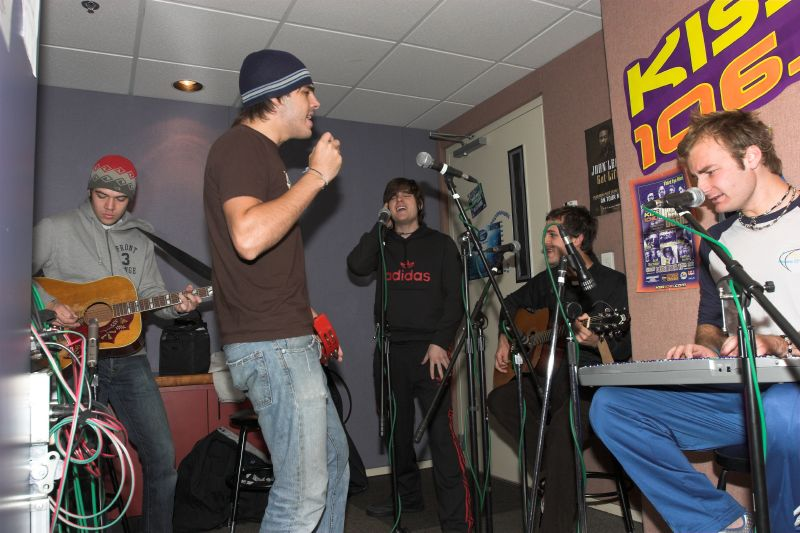
Click Five photographed in studio in late 2005

The album brought widespread commercial success, selling 350,000 copies in the United States. It took the fifteenth place on the Billboard 200 almost immediately. According to The Boston Globe, they "saturated" the media in several Asian countries as well, such as in Cambodia. Amy Doyle, then-MTV vice president, remarked that "I see screaming girls in their future. I see them having to wear disguises". Many stores stocked various Click Five-based items such as lunchboxes, backpacks, trading cards, and hair gel lines. Their album turned out as that year's highest-charting debut from a new rock group, selling 51,541 copies. Their MySpace page hit No. 1 on the "Most Viewed Band Page" ranking as well. The band spent late 2005 and early 2006 as the opening act for Ashlee Simpson, Alanis Morissette and Jesse McCartney as well as touring both by itself and in collaboration with Big City Rock. They also supported the Backstreet Boys on their Never Gone Tour. In August 2005, they performed "Just the Girl" on Late Night with Conan O'Brien. On November 8, the group released the album's second single "Catch Your Wave". The song peaked at number 37 on the US Pop Airplay chart. They performed at Macy's Thanksgiving Day Parade in November 2005, singing "Catch Your Wave". On March 20, 2006, the group released the live EP, Live at Bull Moose, which was recorded on September 14, 2005, at the Bull Moose. A second live EP titled Rolling Stone Originals: The Click Five was recorded in December 2005, in New York, which was released on April 4.

Greetings from Imrie House gathered positive reviews from About.com, where critic Bill Lamb labeled it "a free fall into the world of irresistible melody and guitar-soaked power chords", and from Entertainment Weekly, where critic Gary Susman called it "insanely catchy". Rolling Stone also ran a supportive review from Barry Walters, who stated that the "relentlessly catchy" album featured "several hit-worthy tracks". Critics at USA Today and IGN.com panned the album, the former stating that listeners will be left "craving something more".

Throughout, members saw manager Wayne Sharp as an amiable influence. Producer Mike Denneen said, "He's not a dictator; he's a consensus builder, and he's very good at it... He cajoles and persuades and convinces and everybody is inclined to trust him, including me." However, band members expressed concern that they started out too fast and that they intentionally brought on too much media attention. Members also experienced increasing dissatisfaction with their label. Zehr said, "It's not like the old days, where a label would spend years pumping money to develop an artist... Today it's up to the artists to ready themselves for the big time". He commented as well, "At this point you're kind of turning the label into a bank".

=== 2007–2008: Modern Minds and Pastimes and Dill's departure ===
Through 2006, interest in the band gradually faded. Their songs did not have the chart success that the members had expected. AllMusic critic Stephen Thomas Erlewine has remarked that the band's music "didn't quite stick in the brain". Bassist Ethan Mentzer later said, "There was a point where it felt like we were in an airplane and the engines just died... It was a long, slow glide down." The band went on touring locally in venues such as Hot Stove and Cool Music. The group supported McFly on their Motion in the Ocean tour in the fall of 2006.

Lead singer Eric Dill left the band on November 20, 2006, although was not officially announced until March 2007. The remaining four members released an official statement on the departure in March on their MySpace page, stating that "We know he will be missed by many and we wish him the best success in his other endeavors". They brought on new lead singer Kyle Patrick, whom they had met in November 2006. Patrick had been in his third year at the Berklee College of Music and left in the middle of his studies to join the Click Five as lead vocalist/rhythm guitarist. Dill left the band to pursue a solo music career and later revealed that he left after expressing an interest in acting, following shoot of their movie, Taking Five. He also left the band due to having musical differences with the other members. The film, Taking Five, starring members of the group along with Alona Tal, Daniella Monet, and Christy Carlson Romano, was released in 2007.

Click Five spent early 2007 undergoing a reboot of their musical style, emphasizing new wave and deliberately retro influences with more use of synthesizers. They appeared to be emulating successful alternative rock groups the Killers and Weezer, according to Erlewine. The band also gave up wearing matching outfits and changed to having each member adopt their own modified visual image. When playing songs originally sung by Eric Dill live, they lowered the keys a whole step to suit Kyle Patrick's deeper voice.

The band narrowed down the about seventy songs that they had been working on down to twelve and then recorded their second studio album, Modern Minds and Pastimes. The title was a reference to Ray Charles' 1962 album "Modern Sounds in Country and Western Music". It was released on June 26, 2007. Despite high hopes, the album failed to meet commercial expectations, with only 50,000 copies sold in the U.S. It reached number 136 on the Billboard 200 chart. The album also earned mixed reviews from Erlewine, which stated that "it's hard not to be disappointed", and Adrienne Day of Entertainment Weekly, which called the lyrics "banal" and the overall album as lacking "punch". Chad Grischow of IGN.com labeled it "unfortunately uneven", although he also remarked that it was "worth a listen".

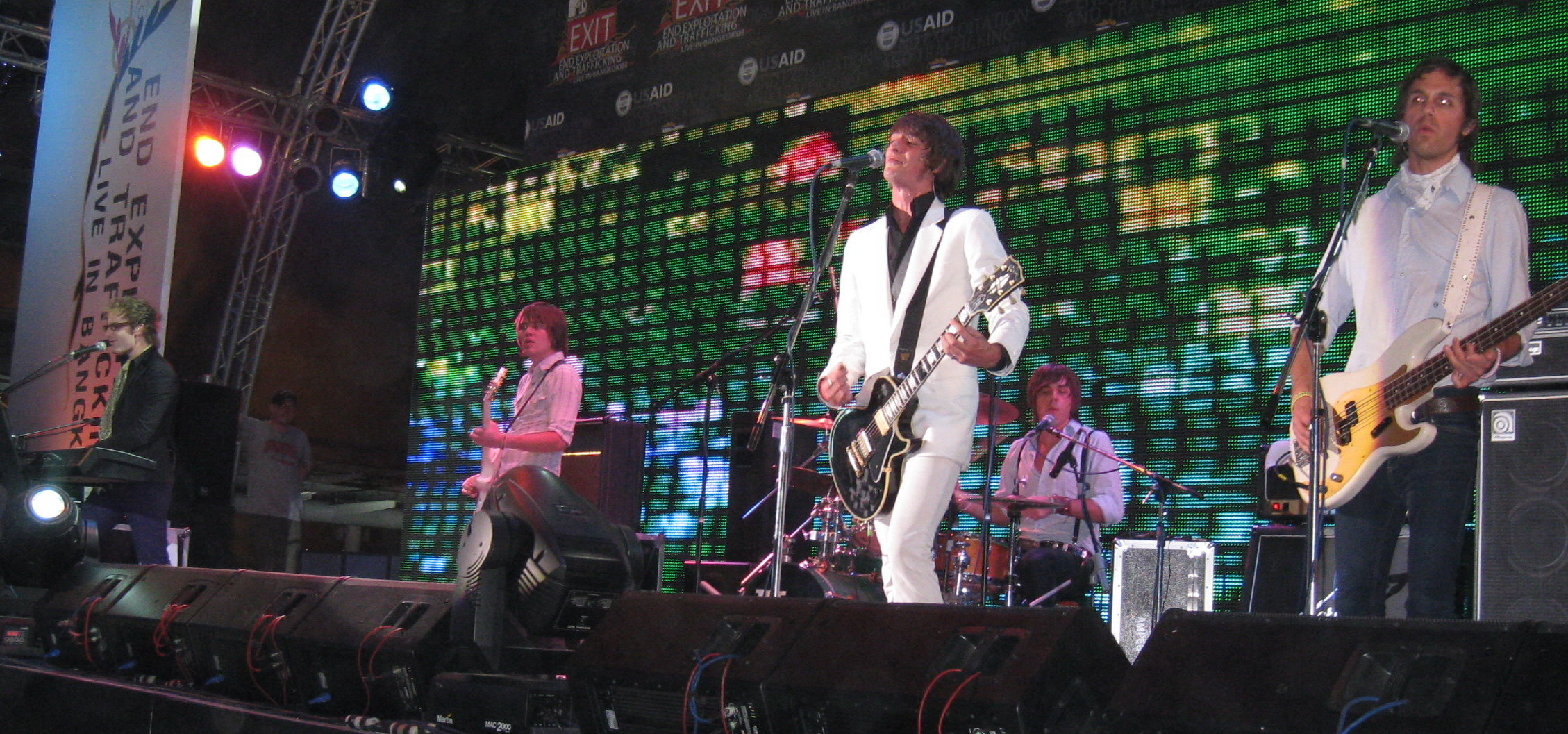
The band performing for MTV EXIT, photographed in December 2008

The album spawned its lead single "Jenny" (co- written by Jez Ashurst and Chris Braide), released on April 10, 2007. It reached the number one spot in charts in Indonesia, the Philippines, Thailand, Singapore, and Taiwan. "Happy Birthday" and "Empty" were subsequently released as follow-up singles, issued for radio airplay in Southeast Asia. The group spent mid to late 2007 touring across various Asian venues, many of them alongside the Black Eyed Peas. They also supported Hilary Duff on a US tour from August to September 2007. The group performed on Fox Network's Good Day Atlanta on August 30. They also appeared on the finale of Singapore TV series Live the Dream. The group performed at Boston Music Awards on Saturday, December 1, 2007, at the Orpheum Theater. They received nominations for "Outstanding Pop Act", "Male Vocalist of the Year" (for Kyle Patrick), and "Song of the Year", and they won for "Outstanding Pop Act". Singapore radio station 98.7 FM voted them "Band of the Year".

The group continued touring to widely receptive audiences in some Asian countries, notably in the Philippines, dubbed the Modern Minds and Great Times Tour throughout 2008. They also released the album's fourth and final single "Flipside" in May 2008, exclusively in Southeast Asia. That year, they co-headlined the first rock concert ever performed at the Angkor Wat Temple. In late 2008, they participated in an MTV EXIT concert in Bangkok done to raise awareness on human trafficking. The band played along with Burmese pop star Phyu Phyu Kyaw Thein and various Thai-based celebrities.

On August 2, 2008, Click Five won the "Knockout Award" at MTV Asia Awards 2008, in Genting Highlands, Malaysia. The award, for "the artist who has successfully captured the hearts of young music audiences in Asia", was a surprise to the band. Through 2008 and early 2009, the band played in various smaller, more niche-based venues in the New England area around this time.

=== 2009–2013: TCV and break-up ===
In March 2009, the group was dropped by their record label. Mike Denneen said, "Atlantic was unwilling to let them become a 'real' band, which is what the guys wanted. Now they're calling the shots and having the opportunity to do what most bands do at the beginning: play and write songs and develop." The band spent the month playing in various local locations such as the Lizard Lounge in Boston. They represented a big change for the Lounge, which was used to hosting alternative rock and indie rock acts. Ben Romans stated that month that a self-financed new album would be coming soon. They recorded the album with Denneen in 2010. The band released two new songs, "I Quit! I Quit! I Quit!" and "Be in Love", available as free singles online. On August 6, 2010, they released their new single "The Way It Goes" to radio, with a record to follow the same year.

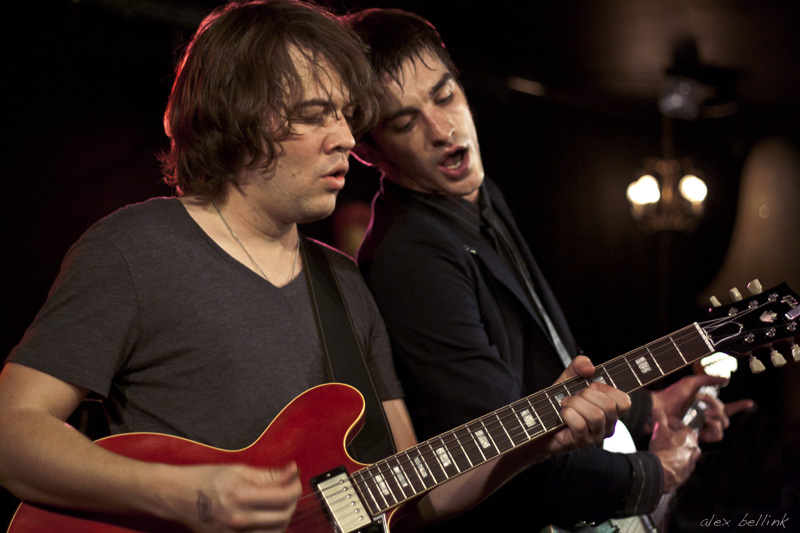
Joe Guese and Kyle Patrick performing in 2011

On November 13, 2010, they announced on their Twitter that their third studio album, entitled TCV, will be released exclusively in Asia on November 16, 2010. A music video for the single, "Don't Let Me Go" was released on April 15, 2011, in partnership with MTV EXIT to bring awareness about human trafficking. The album was released in the UK through Lojinx and in the US on Q Dee Records, in May 2011. A bonus track from TCV, "Love Space Time" appeared on the compilation album Together We Are Not Alone, where profits were donated to the victims of the Great East Japan Earthquake through the Japanese Red Cross Society.

In October 2011, The Click Five began working on an EP that would feature five to six tracks. However, it was they announced on January 14, 2013, on their Facebook page that they have officially parted ways. They stated that they were parting ways so that they may continue to focus on their individual endeavors after a long hiatus and thanked all their fans for supporting them throughout the years.

=== 2025: Return ===
In 2019, Patrick was asked in an interview with CNN Indonesia if the band would reunite in the future, to which he responded, "If the right opportunity and offer came along, [like] a show that could bring us together again, we'd be interested in doing that." In December 2024, it was announced that The Click Five would be returning and performed at Playback Music Festival on May 8, 2025, alongside Boys Like Girls and Secondhand Serenade. They later announced The Click 2025 tour in January, which is set to take place in Southeast Asia from May 4 to May 10. However, they also announced that due to scheduling conflicts, only Kyle Patrick, Joe Guese and Ethan Mentzer would be returning to the band. According to Patrick, Guese brought up the idea for a reunion which him and Mentzer agreed on. He also noted that they could potentially release new music, depending on the reception of the tour. During the tour, the Click Five debuted a new song titled "Throwback". In August 2025, the band played their first show in the US in 15 years, performing at Emo Nite in Los Angeles. They also confirmed that they have plans on embarking a US tour. On August 14, the group joined the Jonas Brothers on their Jonas20: Greetings from Your Hometown Tour in Camden, New Jersey, as a surprise guest performing "Just the Girl". Shortly after, they announced a US tour scheduled for October 2025. On September 2, 2025, they announced to DJ Immortal Of 99.9 Punk World Radio FM that a new single would be released soon. The group released their first single in 15 years titled "Throwback" on October 24.

== Public image ==
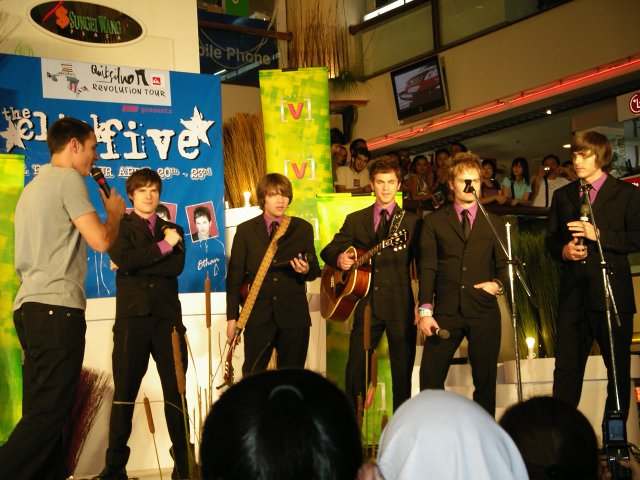
Click Five interviewed in Kuala Lumpur in April 2006, wearing their then-trademark outfits

Early in their career, the band was known for their visual style, appearing in matching Mod-based sharp-looking suits and ties coupled with moptop haircuts, as well as wearing bright collared shirts underneath, and did not appear in public without their matching outfits. During this period their style was reminiscent of the Beatles, the Dave Clark Five and other '60s beat groups. Billboard noted how the group's image was "designed to generate Beatlemania-type hysteria."

The band had a large audience of teenage girls. Guese remarked, "For a lot of these girls it is the first concert they have been to, or the first band they have been linked to." He also said, "Girls going crazy are better than some guy in a bar waiting to fight you outside after you're done playing." Because of this, they were also labelled as a "boyband." While keyboardist Ben Romans felt that the group was more of a "rock and roll band," he noted in their earlier years "we had a singer who was more in line with that."

The Boston Globe referred to their image as "fluffy teen-dream pinups." Mentzer, although defending their image, admitted that the band was perceived as "uncool."

Reviewers from USA Today and About.com criticized the band for being generally too "cutesy," "lacking of substance," "not impressive to today's generation," and "soulless." A Yahoo! Music commentator stated that it "sounds like a soundtrack to a WB show." Rolling Stone India compared the two vocalists, describing Dill's vocals as "Justin Timberlake-like ability to conjure screams from a thousand teenage girls," while Patrick's as a "deeper voice that shaped the darker tones of their weaker-performing second album, Modern Minds and Pastimes."

== Influences ==
Band members have cited power pop leaders Cheap Trick and Matthew Sweet as major influences. They also have cited Talking Heads as an inspiration. John D. Luerssen of Allmusic has stated that they sound similar to the Knack, the Calling, and label-mates Fountains of Wayne. Mikael Wood of Baltimore City Paper has compared the Click Five to Fall Out Boy and the All-American Rejects in terms of sound and crossover appeal. In terms of songwriting, Bill Lamb of About.com has remarked that they seem reminiscent of the Beatles and the Beach Boys. Gary Susman of Entertainment Weekly has stated their vocal harmonies are similar to Queen, but they sing more like the Backstreet Boys. The group classified their sound as "new school power pop."

Several critics and commentators have stated that the Click Five's overall image, style, and performance is evocative of fellow Boston-based band the Cars. In general, Guese has said, "we're a rock band that plays pop songs... I have always been a fan of the three-minute pop song." He has also said, "We just try to have a lot of fun... We try to bring back that old-time rock 'n' roll sort of vibe."

== Band members ==
Current

- Joe Guese – lead guitar, backing vocals (2004–2013, 2025–present)
- Ethan Mentzer – bass, backing vocals (2004–2013, 2025–present)
- Kyle Patrick – lead and backing vocals, rhythm guitar (2007–2013, 2025–present)

Former

- Ben Romans – synthesizers, backing vocals (2004–2013)
- Joey Zehr – drums, percussion, backing vocals (2004–2013)
- Eric Dill – lead and backing vocals, rhythm guitar (2004–2007)

Touring

- Scott Simons – synthesizers, backing vocals (2025–2026)
- Will Sweeny – drums, percussion, backing vocals (2025–present)
- Eric Espiritu – synthesizers, backing vocals (2026–present)

== Discography ==
=== Studio albums ===
List of studio albums, with selected chart positions and sales figures
Title	Album details	Peak chart positions		Sales
Title	Album details	US	KOR Over.	Sales
Greetings from Imrie House	Released: August 8, 2005; Label: Lava, Atlantic; Formats: CD, digital download	15	—	US: 350,000
Modern Minds and Pastimes	Released: June 26, 2007; Label: Lava, Atlantic; Formats: CD, digital download	136	—	US: 50,000
TCV	Released: November 16, 2010; Label: Warner Music Group (Asia), Lojinx (Europe); Formats: CD, digital download	—	20	
"—" denotes a release that did not chart or was not released in that territory.

=== Extended plays ===
List of extended plays with selected details
Title	Album details
Angel to You (Devil to Me)	Released: April 25, 2005; Label: Lava; Format: CD
Live at Bull Moose	Released: March 20, 2006; Label: Atlantic; Format: CD
Rolling Stone Originals: The Click Five	Released: April 4, 2006; Label: Atlantic; Format: Digital download

=== Singles ===
List of singles as lead artist, with selected chart positions and certifications
Title	Year	Peak chart positions							Certifications	Album
Title	Year	US	US AC	US Pop 100	US Pop	CAN CHR	PH	SGP	Certifications	Album
"Angel to You (Devil to Me)"	2005	— (Note: "Angel to You (Devil to Me)" did not enter the US Billboard Hot 100, but peaked at number 7 on the US Hot Singles Sales chart.)	—	—	—	—	—	—		Greetings from Imrie House
"Just the Girl"	2005	11	37	8	18	29	—	—	RIAA: Gold	Greetings from Imrie House
"Catch Your Wave"	2005	— (Note: "Catch Your Wave" did not enter the US Billboard Hot 100, but peaked at number 8 on the Bubbling Under Hot 100 Singles chart.)	—	68	37	—	—	—		Greetings from Imrie House
"Jenny"	2007	—	—	—	—	—	1	1		Modern Minds and Pastimes
"Happy Birthday"	2007	—	—	—	—	—	—	—		Modern Minds and Pastimes
"Empty"	2007	—	—	—	—	—	—	—		Modern Minds and Pastimes
"Flipside"	2008	—	—	—	—	—	—	—		Modern Minds and Pastimes
"I Quit! I Quit! I Quit!"	2009	—	—	—	—	—	—	—		TCV
"The Way It Goes"	2010	—	—	—	—	—	—	—		TCV
"Don't Let Me Go"	2010	—	—	—	—	—	—	—		TCV
"Throwback"	2025	—	—	—	—	—	—	—		TBA
"—" denotes a single that did not chart or was not released in that territory.

=== Promotional singles ===
List of promotional singles
Title	Year	Album
"Pop Princess"	2005	Greetings From Imrie House
"My Girlfriend (Forgot Me This Christmas)"	2005	Non-album singles
"Silent Night"	2005	Non-album singles
"Headlight Disco"	2007	Modern Minds and Pastimes

=== Music videos ===
Title	Year	Director(s)	Ref.
"Just the Girl"	2005	Vem	
"Catch Your Wave"	2005	Vem	
"Kidnap My Heart"	2007	—N/a	
"Jenny"	2007	The Aggressive	
"Happy Birthday"	2007	—N/a	
"Empty"	2008	Conrad Jackson and Conor Colwell	
"Don't Let Me Go"	2011	—N/a	

== Awards and nominations ==
Year	Association	Category	Nominated work	Result	Ref.
2005	Boston Music Awards	New Local Act	The Click Five	Won	
2005	Boston Music Awards	Outstanding Pop/Rock Band	The Click Five	Nominated	
2005	Boston Music Awards	Song of the Year	"Just the Girl"	Nominated	
2005	XM Nation Music Awards	Best New Pop Artist	The Click Five	Won	
2005	XM Nation Music Awards	"On the Rise" - Most Important	The Click Five	Nominated	
2007	Boston Music Awards	Outstanding Pop Act of the Year	The Click Five	Won	
2007	Boston Music Awards	Song of the Year	"Jenny"	Nominated	
2007	Boston Music Awards	Male Vocalist of the Year	Kyle Patrick	Nominated	
2008	MTV Asia Awards	The Knockout Award	The Click Five	Won	
2008	Myx Music Awards	Favorite International Music Video	"Jenny"	Nominated	
2011	Asian Television Award	Best Music Program	"Don't Let Me Go"	Nominated	
