= Empty (The Click Five song) =

Single by the Click Five

from the album Modern Minds and Pastimes
- Released: October 2007
- Genre: Alternative rock; emo pop
- Length: 4:01
- Label: Lava Records; Atlantic Records; WEA International
- Songwriters: Ben Romans; Kyle Patrick
- Producer: Mike Denneen

The Click Five singles chronology
"Happy Birthday" (2007)	"Empty" (2007)	"Flipside" (2008)

Music video
- "Empty" on YouTube

"Empty" is a song by American power pop band the Click Five. It was released in October 2007, as the third single from their second studio album Modern Minds and Pastimes. It was first released as a single in Thailand and the Philippines, while it was released as the second single in Singapore and Malaysia.

== Background and composition ==
Songwriter/keyboardist Ben Romans told Songfacts: "This is a song that actually came right before the record. And I remember it was one of those weird melody things. I have a studio in Boston and I kept hearing this melody, and I had to pull over when I was singing in the car. But fortunately I didn't forget it."

"Empty" was written by Ben Romans and Kyle Patrick, while production was handled by Mike Denneen. Patrick helped co-write the song before he joined the band, which he said helped create "a bit of bonding experience" between him and the group.

Musically, Romans described the track as simplistic and wanted to create an "interesting" arrangements for the instruments, while also wanting to get more experimental with the production.

== Critical reception ==
Colin McGuire of PopMatters stated, "while being heartbroken and expected, is atmospheric and, really, kind of interesting. Instead of just resting on a voice and an acoustic guitar, the song at least tries to become something the band will never be. And that try, of course, is better than nothing."

== Chart performance ==
The song peaked at number one on the Singapore radio airplay chart. It was placed at number 41 on the Singapore Airplay Top 100 year-end chart in 2008.

== Music video ==
The music video for "Empty" premiered via MTV on January 31, 2008. Visually, the video shows a montage of broken glass, blurry and melancholy photos and fallen leaves. The video was directed by Conrad Jackson and Conor Colwell. The video was filmed the day after their appearance at the Boston Music Awards and was shot at Commonwealth Avenue.

== Personnel ==
Credits for "Empty" adapted from album's liner notes.

The Click Five

- Kyle Patrick – lead vocals, rhythm guitar
- Joe Guese – lead guitar, backing vocals
- Ben Romans – synthesizers, backing vocals
- Ethan Mentzer – bass, backing vocals
- Joey Zehr – drums, percussion, backing vocals

Additional musicians

- Mike Denneen – keyboards
- Matt Tahaney – backing vocals
- John Powhida – backing vocals
- Aaron Lippert – backing vocals

Production

- Mike Denneen – producer, engineer
- Andy Vandette – mastering
- Mike Shipley – mixing

== Charts ==
=== Weekly charts ===
Weekly chart performance for "Empty"
Chart (2008)	Peak position
Singapore Airplay (Mediacorp)	1

=== Year-end charts ===
Year-end chart performance for "Empty"
Chart (2008)	Position
Singapore Airplay (Mediacorp)	41

== Release history ==
Release dates and formats for "Empty"
Region	Date	Format	Label	Ref.
Thailand	October 2007	Contemporary hit radio	WEA International	
Philippines	October 2007	Contemporary hit radio	WEA International	
Malaysia	March 2008	Contemporary hit radio	WEA International	
Singapore	March 2008	Contemporary hit radio	WEA International	
