= Kyle Patrick =

American singer, songwriter and producer (born 1986)

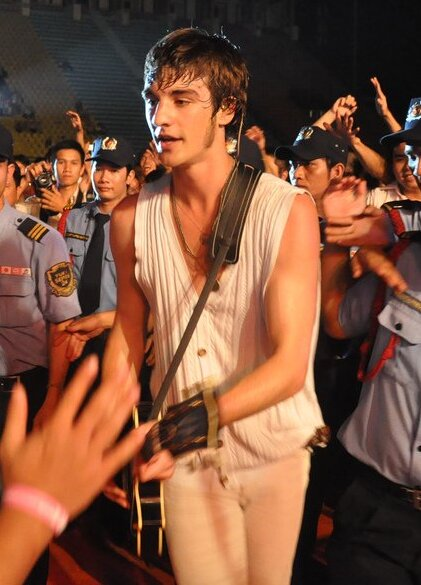
- Patrick in 2010

Background information
- Born: Kyle Patrick Dickherber; May 20, 1986 (age 40); St. Charles, Missouri, U.S.
- Occupations: Producer; songwriter; vocalist; multi-instrumentalist
- Instruments: Vocals; guitar
- Years active: 2005–present
- Member of: The Click Five
- Formerly of: Hillside Manor

Kyle Patrick Dickherber (born May 20, 1986) is an American singer, songwriter and producer. He has earned multiple gold records as an artist, and over 200 million streams as a producer & songwriter. He is the lead singer of Boston power pop band The Click Five, which saw numerous radio hits from 2007 to 2010.

== Early life ==
Kyle was raised in Marietta, Georgia. At the age of 11, he began performing music, citing Eric Clapton and his bands Derek & The Dominos, Cream, Stevie Ray Vaughan Pink Floyd and James Taylor as his early influences. Kyle graduated from Lassiter High School and later moved to Boston to attend Berklee College of Music on a scholarship where he studied songwriting for guitarists.

In 2007, he left his studies to join The Click Five as the lead vocalist and rhythm guitarist.

== Career ==
=== 2005–2007: Beginnings ===
Patrick formed a band with close friends from high school, Patrick McGraw and Billy Justineau, and later added friend Josh Dockins to the lineup. The band was called Hillside Manor. It was formed circa 2004. Patrick left Hillside Manor to pursue The Click Five, but the remaining band members continued to write and perform under the name for a few years following.

Before he officially joined The Click Five, Patrick had co-written the song "Empty" with The Click Five's keyboardist Ben Romans. After The Click Five recorded and released the song featuring Patrick's vocals, "Empty" became a #1 radio hit in multiple countries throughout Southeast Asia.

=== 2007–2013, 2025: The Click Five ===
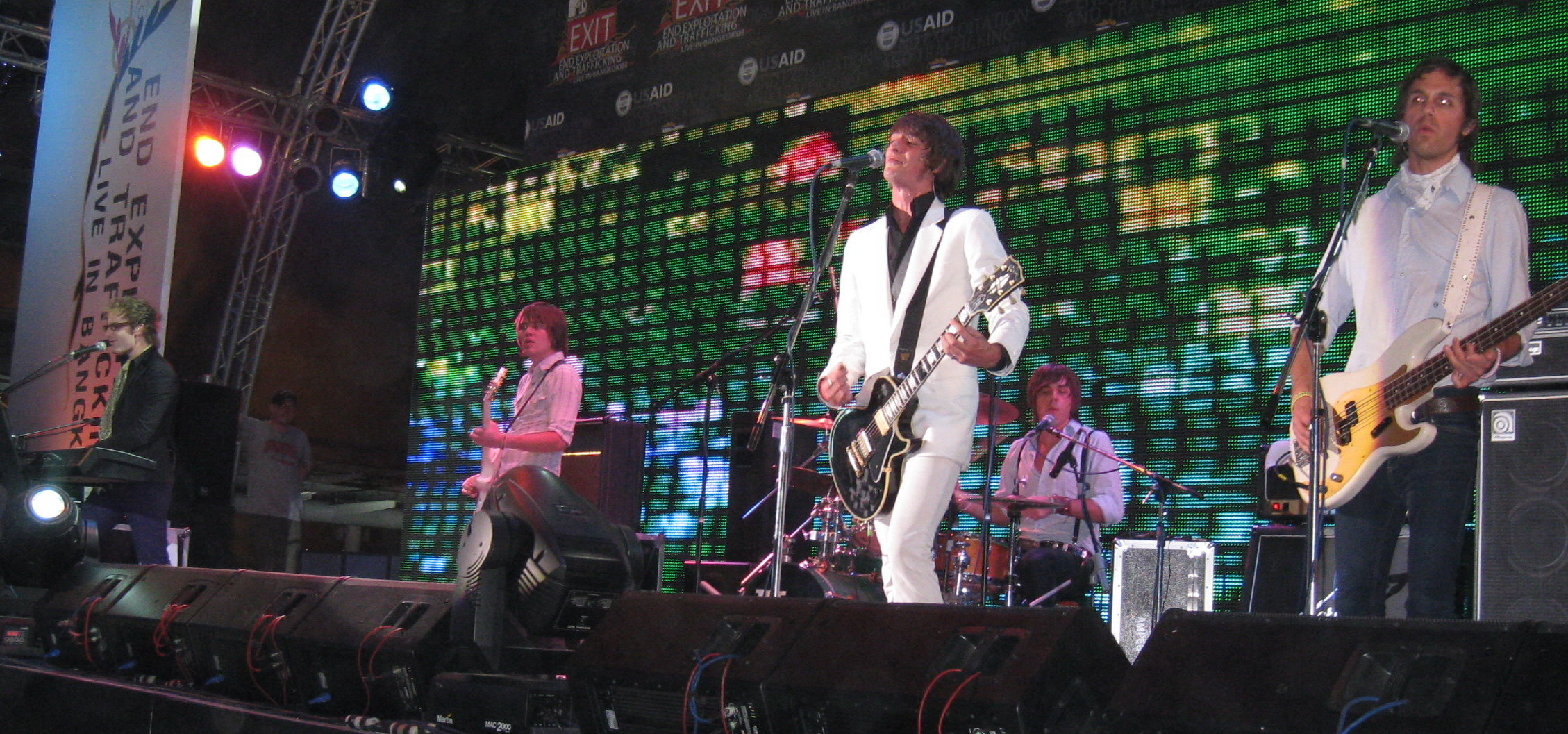
Patrick performing with The Click Five in December 2008

In 2007, Patrick took over The Click Five following the departure of Eric Dill and sang the lead vocals on their sophomore album, Modern Minds and Pastimes. With Patrick at the helm, the band has sold over two million records to date and had number-one singles in no less than eight countries. 2008 saw The Click Five headline sold-out arenas on three continents as well as perform with groups like The Black Eyed Peas, The Script, and Placebo. Cheryl Leong of MTV described Patrick's voice as "Deep, Powerful, Steady, and Strong." The year culminated in a sea of wins for the band, including the Knockout Award from MTV Asia, Band of the Year from Singapore's 987FM, and Most Outstanding Pop Act at the Boston Music Awards.

The band's third studio release, TCV, was released exclusively in Singapore on November 16, 2010, and subsequently released to other countries. Three singles were released: "I Quit! I Quit! I Quit!", "The Way It Goes" and "Don't Let Me Go". The third single, "Don't Let Me Go", was picked up by MTV EXIT to help raise awareness for human trafficking. The band filmed a music video with MTV EXIT. The music video includes real-life statistics of human trafficking and makes use of blindfolds to show that people need to be more aware of what happens around them.

Together with the band, they traveled to Phnom Penh, where they headlined MTV EXIT's free concert with Korean girl band After School, performing in front of an audience of approximately 40,000. They visited the Transitions shelter, a home for young girls who have managed to escape the wrath of human trafficking.

The Click Five officially disbanded on January 14, 2013.

In January 2025, the group announced The Click 2025 tour, which is set to take place in Southeast Asia from May 4 to May 10. They are also set to perform at the Playback Music Festival on May 8, alongside Boys Like Girls and Secondhand Serenade.

=== 2010–2021: Solo career, production work and songwriting ===
Patrick embarked on a solo career in May 2010, when he released his first solo EP, KP, on Bandcamp. All 6 songs on the EP were self-produced, and featured a wide variety of instruments on it, all performed by Kyle Patrick. He remained a member of The Click Five until the band decided to part ways on January 14, 2013. For KP, fans were able to download the 6-song EP, at a price of their choice. He gave an explanation, saying, "The price is pay-what-you-want -- including zero. You can pay any amount, or pay nothing. It is your choice. This music means the world to me, and I want you to have it." In June 2011, Patrick launched a campaign to raise funds for his next EP. From mid-December 2011 to early January 2012, Patrick traveled to Singapore, Kuala Lumpur and Phnom Penh to promote his solo work. He performed at TAB, an intimate live music venue in Singapore, to a sold-out crowd.

Patrick performing in December 2011

On June 20, 2012, Patrick premiered the single "Go For Gold". He then released his second solo EP, Kyle Patrick on July 20. The EP consists of five tracks: "Follow Your Heartbeat", "Go For Gold!", "Wild Ways", "Baby Don't Board That Plane" and a cover of "Ain't No Sunshine". Patrick stated that the EP had been in the works for 5 years, and he had started working on it when he was in college. Patrick performed in Dumaguete on August 17, 2012, for an MTV EXIT roadshow. In August 2012, Patrick announced that he would be accompanying British-Irish boy band The Wanted on their Asian tour, and would play in Kuala Lumpur and in Jakarta with the band as the opening act. He performed at MTV Sessions at MTV Asia on September 8, 2012.

Since the release of his EP, he became a producer and songwriter, working with emerging artists SVĒ, Jesse Ruben, Beach Tiger, Spirit Twin, Gryps, Rah-C, Shea Diamond, among others, and has seen over 75 million streams across all streaming platforms. After taking a hiatus from performing live, Patrick made numerous live performances since 2012, including an appearance at Emo Night in March, a performance in Singapore in April and Music Matters in September 2019. In 2020, he spent time producing for Singapore artist Jayefunk.

=== 2022: PACER ===
In February 2022, Patrick announced via his Instagram account that he will be returning under new alias, PACER, after a 10-year hiatus as a solo artist. In May 2024, he released his first single "No Drama" under the name. It was originally slated for release in 2021, however, due to a motorcycle accident which resulted in him breaking his neck and almost left him paralyzed, the release was delayed because of his injuries.

== Personal life ==
He currently resides in Los Angeles, California, with his wife Sophie Bruza, where he owns a recording studio. In 2021, Kyle was in a motorcycle accident, where he broke his neck in two places.

== Philanthropy ==
In 2011, Kyle was a Celebrity Ambassador with MTV EXIT, performing countries like Cambodia and Thailand to raise awareness about human trafficking. He visited shelters to interact with human trafficking victims, as well as to hear their life stories. He was also involved with the Human Trafficking Awareness Council and performed at the 2011 Freedom Walk and rally against human trafficking in New York City.

In addition to his performances to raise awareness about human trafficking, Kyle was also an active participant in the annual New York City Marathon to raise funds for charity. In 2010, the funds he raised went to Team For Kids, and in 2011, to the Christopher & Dana Reeve Foundation.

== Awards ==
Patrick's song "Follow Your Heartbeat" won the Best Pop Song award at the 2013 Independent Music Awards.

== Discography ==
=== Extended plays ===
List of EPs with selected details
Title	Details
KP	Released: May 20, 2010; Label: Self-released; Format: CD, streaming
Kyle Patrick	Released: July 20, 2012; Label: Self-released; Distributor: Warner Music (Asia); Format: CD, digital download

=== Singles ===
List of singles, with selected chart positions, showing year released and album name
Title	Year	Peak chart positions	Album
Title	Year	SGP	Album
"Go For Gold"	2012	9	Kyle Patrick
"No Drama"	2024	—	TBA
"Belong"	2024	—	TBA
"—" denotes a single that did not chart or was not released in that territory.
