= MTV EXIT =

Initiative to raise awareness of human trafficking

MTV EXIT Foundation
- Founded: 2003
- Founder: Tom Ehr and Simon Goff
- Purpose: Combat human trafficking and slavery
- Headquarters: Bangkok, Thailand
- Region served: Indonesia, Philippines, Vietnam, Cambodia, Thailand, Myanmar
- CEO: Georgia Arnold
- Website: Official website
- Formerly called: MTV Europe Foundation

The MTV EXIT (End Exploitation and Trafficking) campaign is a multimedia initiative produced by MTV EXIT Foundation (formerly known as the MTV Europe Foundation) to raise awareness and increase prevention of human trafficking and modern slavery. The MTV EXIT Foundation was co-founded by Tom Ehr and Simon Goff The MTV EXIT Foundation is a registered UK charity launched by MTV Networks Europe in 2003 to use the power and influence of MTV's brand and broadcasting network to educate young people about the social issues affecting their lives.

The main elements of MTV EXIT's campaign include:

1. On Air; the production and broadcast of both dedicated and peripheral campaign exposure.
2. On the Ground; awareness-raising events including large-scale concerts, youth sessions, roadshow events and community screenings.
3. Online; production and maintenance of a multi-language, youth-oriented awareness and prevention website.

In June 2004, MTV EXIT Foundation and Sida (Swedish International Development Cooperation Agency) joined in an alliance to combat trafficking in women for sexual exploitation in Europe. The campaign was branded as MTV EXIT, and launched in July 2004 at the EXIT Festival in Novi Sad, Serbia & Montenegro.

In 2007, MTV EXIT expanded across MTV's channels in Asia and the Pacific in partnership with USAID, AusAID, Walk Free, and ASEAN. The campaign features similar elements to the European initiative. MTV EXIT in Asia and the Pacific is focusing on three major forms of trafficking in Asia and the Pacific: sex trafficking and forced prostitution, labour trafficking, and forced domestic servitude. Also, due to the complexities of trafficking and the differences found geographically, the campaign is split into two regions: Asia-Pacific and South Asia.

Taking into consideration all outputs of MTV EXIT including their partnerships with over 50 anti-trafficking NGOs across Europe and Asia, the alliance has directly reached an estimated 7.5 million people through television, events, and the Internet, and countless more through additional media coverage generated.

== History ==
The MTV Europe Foundation was established in 2003 by MTV Networks Europe to expand its commitment to social issues and human rights. As a result, MTV Networks Europe launched the MTV Europe Foundation, a legally independent, but closely related, corporate charity. The MTV Europe Foundation is incorporated under United Kingdom law as a charitable company (UK Charity. No.1103267).

The MTV Europe Foundation runs multimedia campaigns including the MTV EXIT campaign to fight human trafficking.

In 2010 The MTV Europe Foundation was renamed the MTV EXIT Foundation.

== On Air ==
The MTV EXIT Campaign has been producing an array of programming since 2004 in multiple formats including music videos, documentaries, short fictional films, live event programmes, and public service announcements.

=== MTV EXIT Live ===
MTV EXIT has also made a number of live programs including: Rise: A Tough Ascent (featuring Kate Miller-Heidke); Placebo Live in Angkor Wat; The Click Five Live in Cambodia; MTV EXIT Live in Taiwan; MTV EXIT Live in Manila; MTV EXIT Live in Yangon; and MTV EXIT Live in Bangkok.

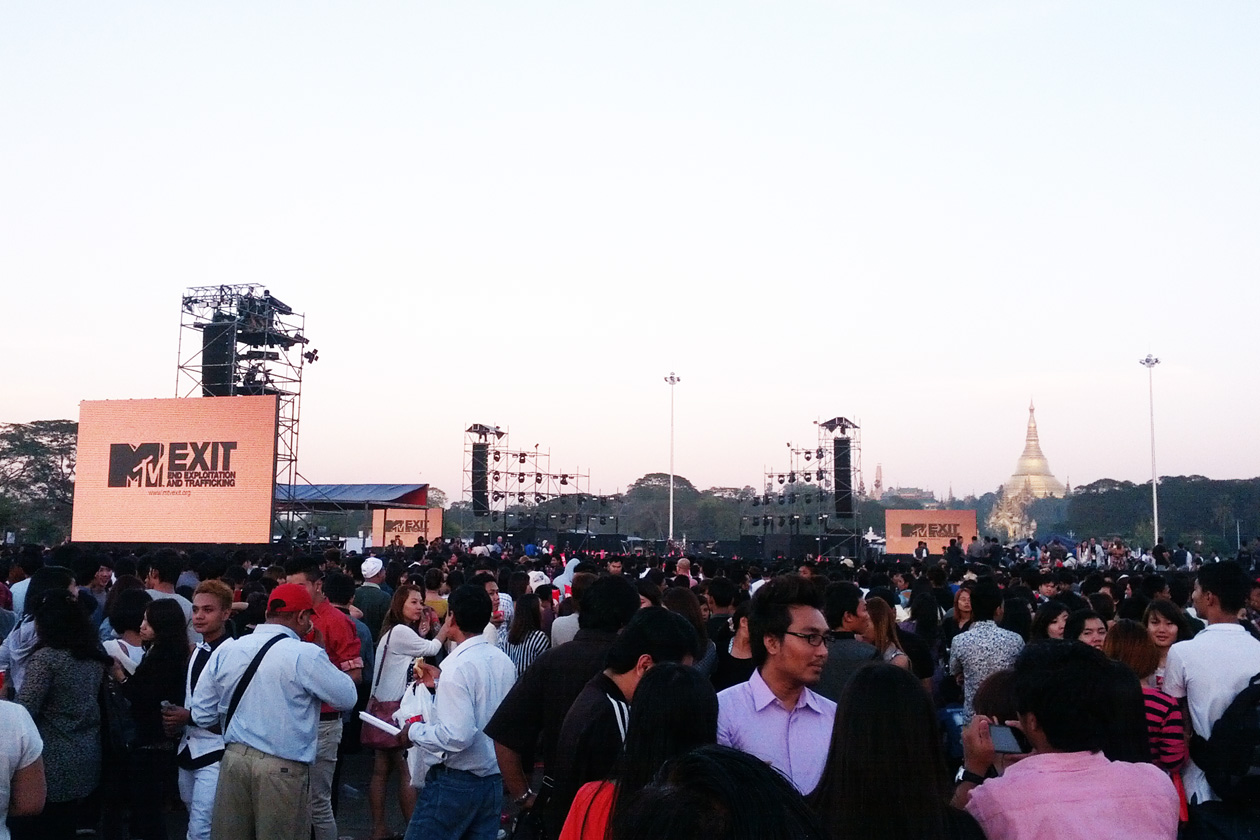
MTV Exit Live Yangon

== Distribution ==
To maximize the coverage of the campaign all MTV EXIT programming is produced rights-free and distributed free of charge to any broadcaster that wishes to air the programming as well as any organisation or individual that wants to use the programming in outreach educational work.
