= Eric Dill =

American singer and songwriter

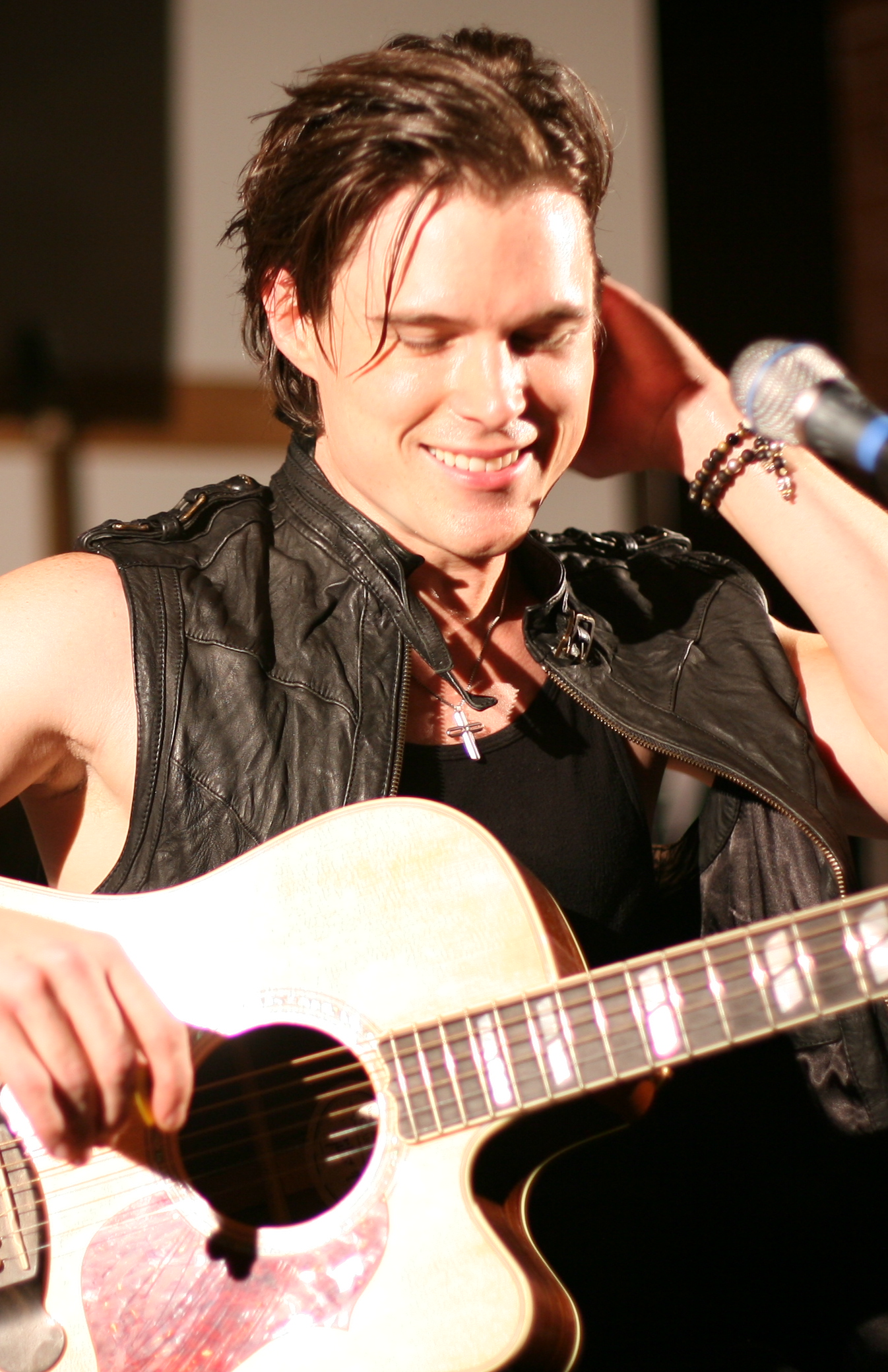
- Dill in 2012

Background information
- Born: Eric Murnan Dill; February 10, 1981 (age 45); Indianapolis, Indiana, United States
- Genres: Pop rock; power pop; pop-punk; teen pop; alternative rock
- Occupations: Singer; songwriter; musician
- Instruments: Vocals; guitar
- Years active: 2003–present
- Labels: Lava; Atlantic
- Formerly of: The Click Five

Eric Murnan Dill (born February 10, 1981) is an American singer and songwriter. He is best known as the lead singer for the band The Click Five. He left the group in 2007 to pursue a solo career. Additionally, he has worked with and contributed songwriting for artists such as Daughtry and Chad Kroeger.

== Early life ==
Dill was born and raised in Indianapolis, Indiana, United States. He is the son of Greg Dill and Sheryl Murnan Dill. He attended Brebeuf Jesuit Preparatory School and Purdue University. He attended high school along with The Click Five drummer Joey Zehr. He graduated from Purdue University in 2004, and earned a bachelor's degree in industrial technology. His father owns Allied Automation, an industrial distributor and engineering company, which Dill was interested in joining, before pursuing a career in music.

When Dill was twelve years old, he started learning how to play guitar, after receiving it as a gift for Christmas. He started the band Panagia with Zehr while in high school in 1996. They were influenced by 311 and Limp Bizkit. As a freshmen attending Purdue University, he formed another band called Amino, where his band played at fraternity parties and other campus venues. With little rehearsal space, he decided to join a student organization to use rooms in campus buildings, forming The Purdue Independent Musicians. They played at Boiler Gold Rush events and later won the 2002 Purdue Battle of the Bands. He cites influences from Freddie Mercury, Elton John, Billy Joel and Michael Jackson, among many more.

== Career ==
He became the lead singer of the pop-rock group The Click Five. In the summer of 2003, Dill received a call from Zehr, who he stayed in contact with while Zehr was attending Berklee School of Music, and asked if he wanted to join the band. After flying out to Boston and getting to know the rest of the members, Dill officially joined the group in 2004. With the band they released their debut studio album, Greetings from Imrie House on August 16, 2005, his first and only with the band. On November 20, 2006, Dill left the group which wasn't officially announced until March 2007. He left the band soon after filming the movie Taking Five with the band and left to focus on his solo music career. He also left due to musical differences with other members of the band. In early 2007, he wrote the song "No Surprise", shortly after signing a publisher deal with Sony. However the song was later given to Daughtry and was released as the first single on their second studio album, Leave This Town. According to Dill, Chad Kroeger was in the studio with the band and came across Dill's demo. He envisioned a heavier sound for the song and called up Dill to Vancouver to re-work the song.

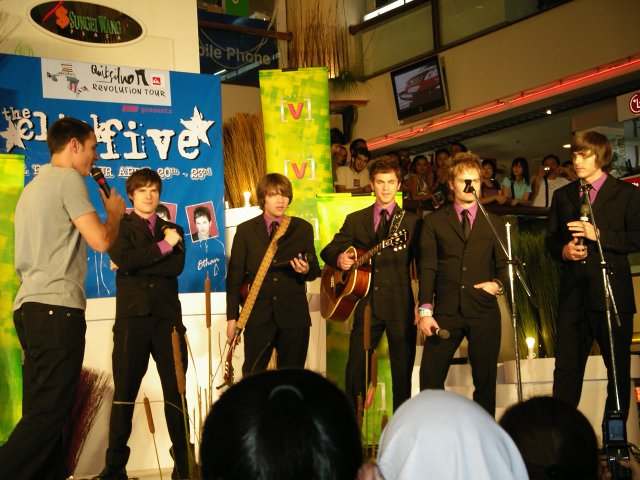
Dill with The Click Five in 2006

In 2008, Dill worked with Kara DioGuardi and David Hodges on his upcoming debut studio album, which was expected to be released later that year, via Atlantic Records. He released a music video to the song "Leaving You Lonely" on December 2, 2010. In 2012, Dill released his first collection of four songs titled Wherever You Are. With record producer Matt Radosevich and mastering by Eric Valentine, the sound was created to capture and add the distinct flavor of Dill's delivery of style. Major influences include U2, Nine Inch Nails, Savage Garden, Our Lady Peace and Thirty Seconds to Mars. The collection was recorded at Barefoot Studios in Los Angeles. He had written the EP in New York City, while finishing the rest of the record in Hollywood, Los Angeles. He also released a music video for the title track. In support of his solo music, he performed a show at The Viper Room in April.

Dill's first and only full-length studio album, Forever Is Not Enough, was released on November 20, 2012. It featured 13 original songs. He released the album independently instead of through a major record label as originally intended, and speaking about if he would ever sign to a label ever again, Dill stated, "Nope... never. What I would do is, I would work with them to distribute my record. I would never sign my life away to people who care nothing about music, and care nothing about me." The album features an up-tempo rock sound, while maintaining a pop-friendly sound. "War With the Wolves" was the first single released from the album. The song was listed in the Billboard Top 40 Indicator Chart. He released a music video for the single and was featured on mtvU. "In My Head", another single from the album, was released to radio on January 14, 2013. Since then, he has released two non-album singles "Might as Well Play Some Rock and Roll" in 2018 and "On Our Way to Paradise" in 2023.

== Achievements ==
Dill was a recipient at the 2010 BMI Pop Awards for Award-Winning Songs for "No Surprise".

== Personal life ==
In 2007, Dill moved to Los Angeles. In late 2012, Dill relocated from Hollywood to his native Indianapolis. He dated Lucy Walsh.

== Discography ==
with The Click Five

- Greetings From Imrie House (2005)

Solo artist

=== Studio albums ===
List of studio albums with selected details
Title	Details
Forever Is Not Enough	Released: November 20, 2012; Label: Vigil Records; Formats: CD, digital download

=== Extended plays ===
List of EPs with selected details
Title	Details
Wherever You Are	Released: January 10, 2012; Label: Self-released; Formats: Digital download

=== Singles ===
List of singles, with selected chart positions
Title	Year	Peak chart positions	Album
Title	Year	US Pop Ind.	Album
"War With the Wolves"	2012	40	Forever Is Not Enough
"In My Head"	2013	—	Forever Is Not Enough
"Might as Well Play Some Rock and Roll"	2018	—	Non-album singles
"On Our Way to Paradise"	2023	—	Non-album singles
"—" denotes a recording that did not chart.

=== Music videos ===
Title	Year	Director(s)	Ref.
"Leaving You Lonely"	2010	Eric Dill and David Urbina	
"Wherever You Are"	2012	Johnny Lee	
"War with the Wolves"	2012	—N/a	
"In My Head"	2013	Bryan Sandlin	
"Forever Is Not Enough"	2013	Bryan Sandlin	

== Filmography ==
Year	Title	Role	Ref.
2007	Taking Five	Ritchie	
