= 2000s in music =

For music from a year in the 2000s, go to 00 | 01 | 02 | 03 | 04 | 05 | 06 | 07 | 08 | 09

This article is an overview of the major events and trends in popular music in the 2000s.

In American culture, various styles of the late 20th century remained popular, such as rock, pop, metal, hip-hop, R&B, EDM, country, and indie. As the technology of computers and internet sharing developed, a variety of those genres started to fuse, and new styles arose from them. Terms like "contemporary", "nu", "revival", "alternative", and "post" are added to various genre titles in order to differentiate them from past styles, with nu-disco and post-punk revival as notable examples.

The popularity of teen pop carried over from the 1990s with acts such as *NSYNC, Backstreet Boys, Britney Spears, and Christina Aguilera dominating the charts in the earlier years of the decade. Previously established pop music artists such as Michael Jackson and Madonna made a comeback in the early 2000s with successful releases such as Invincible and Music. Contemporary R&B was one of the most popular genres of the decade (especially in the early and mid-2000s), with artists like Usher, Alicia Keys, Beyoncé, and Rihanna. In 2004, the Billboard Year-End Hot 100 had 15 of its top 25 singles as contemporary R&B.

The decade was dominated by the garage rock revival and the birth of a new indie rock style. In this decade, grime and dubstep were genres invented in the UK, while chillwave became popular in the United States in the latter part of the decade.

In Britain, post-Britpop, post-punk revival, and alternative rock were at the height of their popularity, with acts such as Coldplay, The Libertines, Travis, The Hives, and Radiohead topping the major charts worldwide. 1990s Britpop-era acts also released new material, such as Oasis and Blur.

Hip-hop achieved major mainstream status after the 1990s including Atlanta, Houston, New Orleans mainstream success. Popular rap movements of the 2000s include crunk, snap, hyphy, and alternative hip-hop.

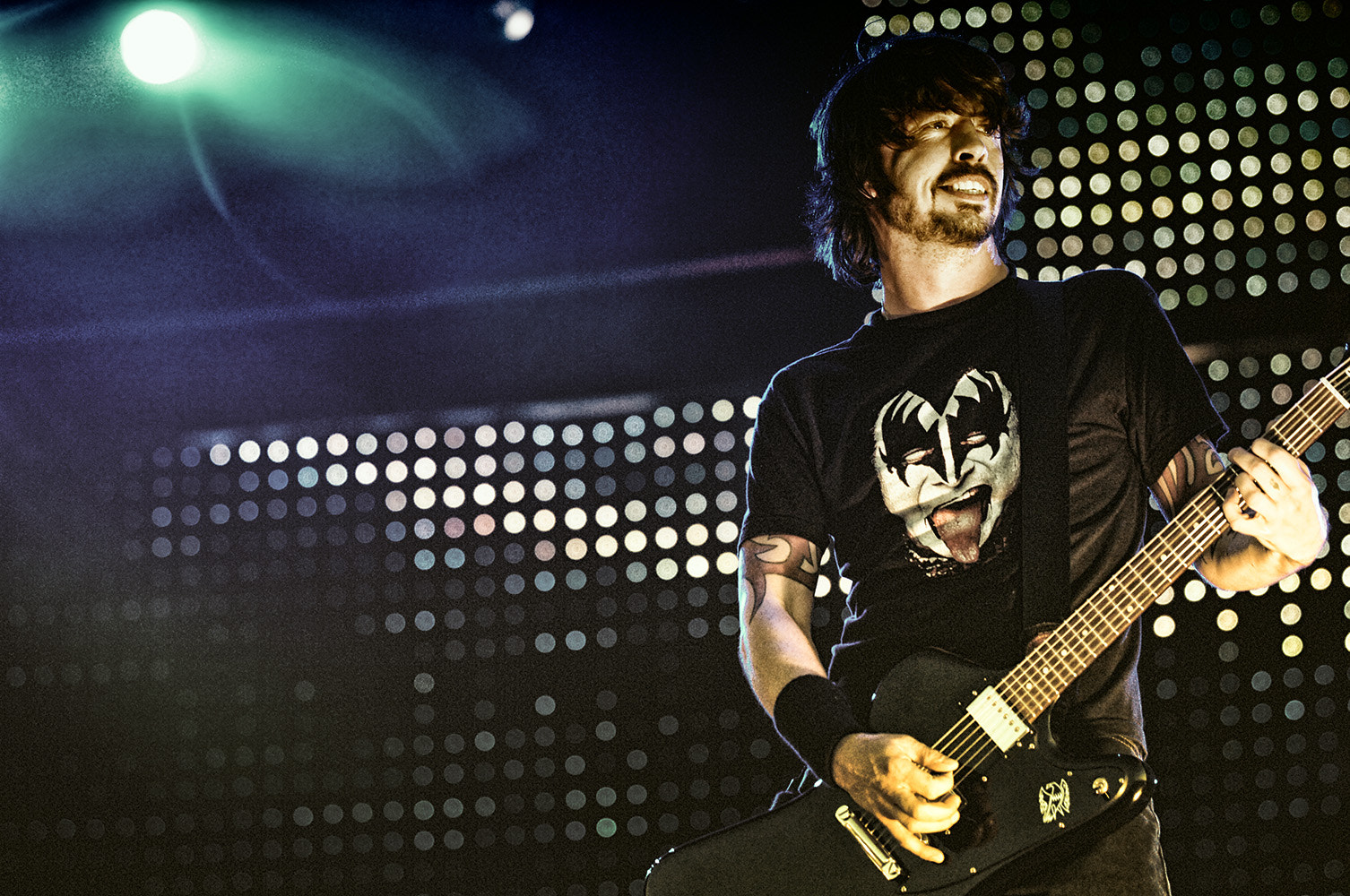
Dave Grohl of Foo Fighters performing in 2005. Foo Fighters achieved major commercial success and won multiple Grammy Awards in the 2000s, including Grammy Award for Best Rock Album in 2001, 2004, and 2008.

Despite the hip-hop dominance, such as Southern hip-hop which lasted for most of the decade (particularly the middle years), rock music was still popular, notably alternative rock, and especially genres such as post-grunge, post-Britpop, nu metal, pop-punk, emo, post-hardcore, metalcore, and in some cases indie rock; the early and mid-2000s saw a resurgence in the mainstream popularity of pop rock and power pop.

Even though the popularity among the mainstream audience dipped slightly, country music continued to rise in sales, having a strong niche in the music industry. The genre saw the rise of new front-runners like Taylor Swift, Carrie Underwood, and Miley Cyrus, who was able to score top hits on all-genre Billboard charts, apart from the country charts, by appealing to a wider audience outside the genre.

Electronic music was also popular throughout the decade; at the beginning of the 2000s, genres such as trance, chillout, house, indietronica, and Eurodance (in Europe) were popular. By the end of the decade, late 1980s/early 1990s inspired dance-oriented forms of electronic music such as synthpop, electropop, and electro house had become popular.

By the end of the decade, a fusion between hip-hop and electronic dance similar to the freestyle music of the late 1980s and early 1990s, known as hip house and electrohop also grew successful.

In many Asian musical markets, with the increase of globalization, music became more Westernized, with influences of pop, hip-hop, and contemporary R&B becoming ever-present in Eastern markets. American and European popular music also became more popular in Asia.

Genres such as J-pop and K-pop remained popular throughout the decade, proliferating their cultural influence throughout the East and Southeast of Asia. In other parts of Asia, including India, Indian pop music, closely linked to Bollywood films and filmi music, was popular alongside Western pop music.

In Latin America, whilst R&B, hip-hop, and pop rock did have influence and success, Latin-based pop music remained highly popular.

Reggaetón became a definitive genre in 2000s Latin music, as well as salsa and merengue. Subgenres fusing Latin music such as merengue and reggaetón with hip-hop and rap music became popular from the middle of the decade onwards.

In the mid-2000s, Narcocorrido music initially becomes a regional musical preference in many parts of Mexico and the southwestern United States. By 2006-2007 the genre had racked up sales averaging over $2 million per year beginning in 2005. No other regional Mexican music genere had garnered more sales and radio play as did Narcocorridos during this era.

The continued development of studio recording software and electronic elements was observed throughout this decade. One such example is the usage of pitch correction software, such as auto-tune that appeared in the late 1990s. The internet allowed for unprecedented access to music and made it possible for artists to distribute their music freely without label backing. New online outlets and unprecedented access to music also offered musicians more musical influences to draw from.

== North America ==
=== Hip-hop ===
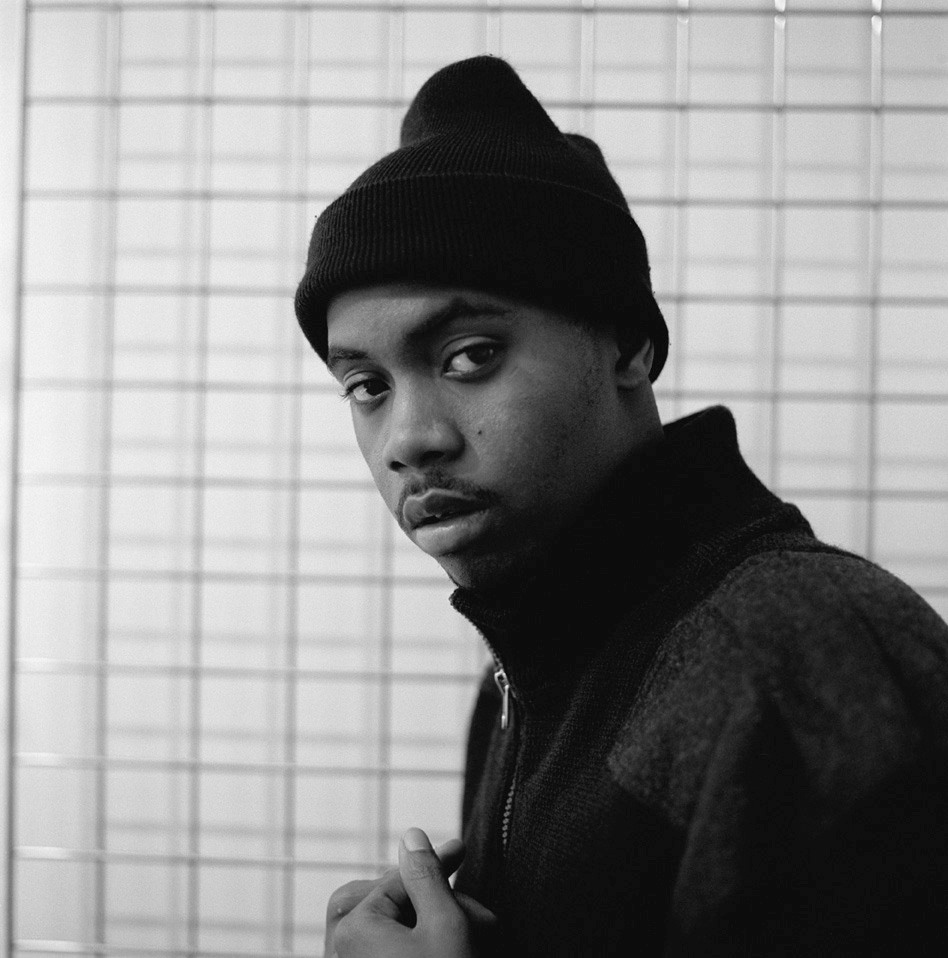
Nas is regarded as one of the greatest rappers of all time.

Hip-hop dominated popular music in the early 2000s. Artists such as Eminem, Outkast, Black Eyed Peas, T.I., 50 Cent, Kanye West, Nelly, Common, Nas, Jay-Z, Busta Rhymes, Puff Daddy, Snoop Dogg, Missy Elliott, M.I.A., Lil' Kim, Gorillaz, Jeezy, Lil Wayne, Timbaland, The Game, Cam'ron and Ludacris were among the dominant mainstream hip-hop artists to have represented the hip-hop genre for the decade. By 1999, more 2000s styled glam started coming in, along with dirty south and crunk, with artists such as Mannie Fresh, Cam'ron, Lil Jon, Ludacris, Trina, Three 6 Mafia, Ying Yang Twins, Bubba Sparxxx, Neptunes, and Jay-Z. Distinct regional differences also developed outside the hip-hop/rap strongholds of the 1990s, New York City and Los Angeles. Though the Los Angeles style of the 1990s waned, gangsta rap continued to be popular through the 2000s, and more commercially oriented party rap dominated the charts. The emergence of hip-hop from the south and the Midwest was starting to take place, and by the end of the decade, hip-hop was starting to spread internationally.

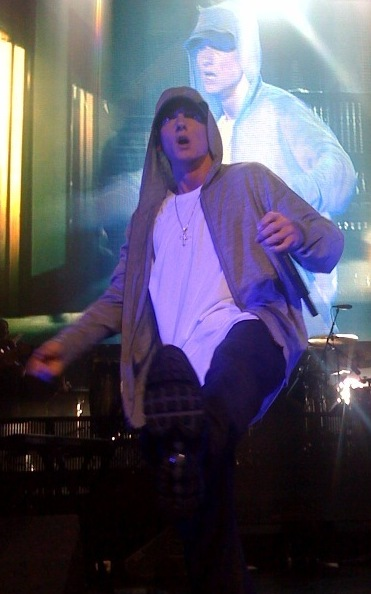
American rapper Eminem is the most commercially successful artist of the decade.

During the 2000s, Eminem, who is perhaps best known for being one of the few successful white rappers in the music industry, enjoyed a massive commercial success and maintained commercial relevance by attempting to be controversial and subversive. According to Billboard, two of Eminem's albums are among the top five highest-selling albums of the 2000s. After the release of his album Relapse, Eminem became the best-selling rapper of all time and the top selling artist of the decade across all genres. "Ringtone rap", which is rap music that was made popular for ringtones, which includes more "laid back" and "silly" elements along with repetitive hooks, became very popular in the later part of the 2000s.

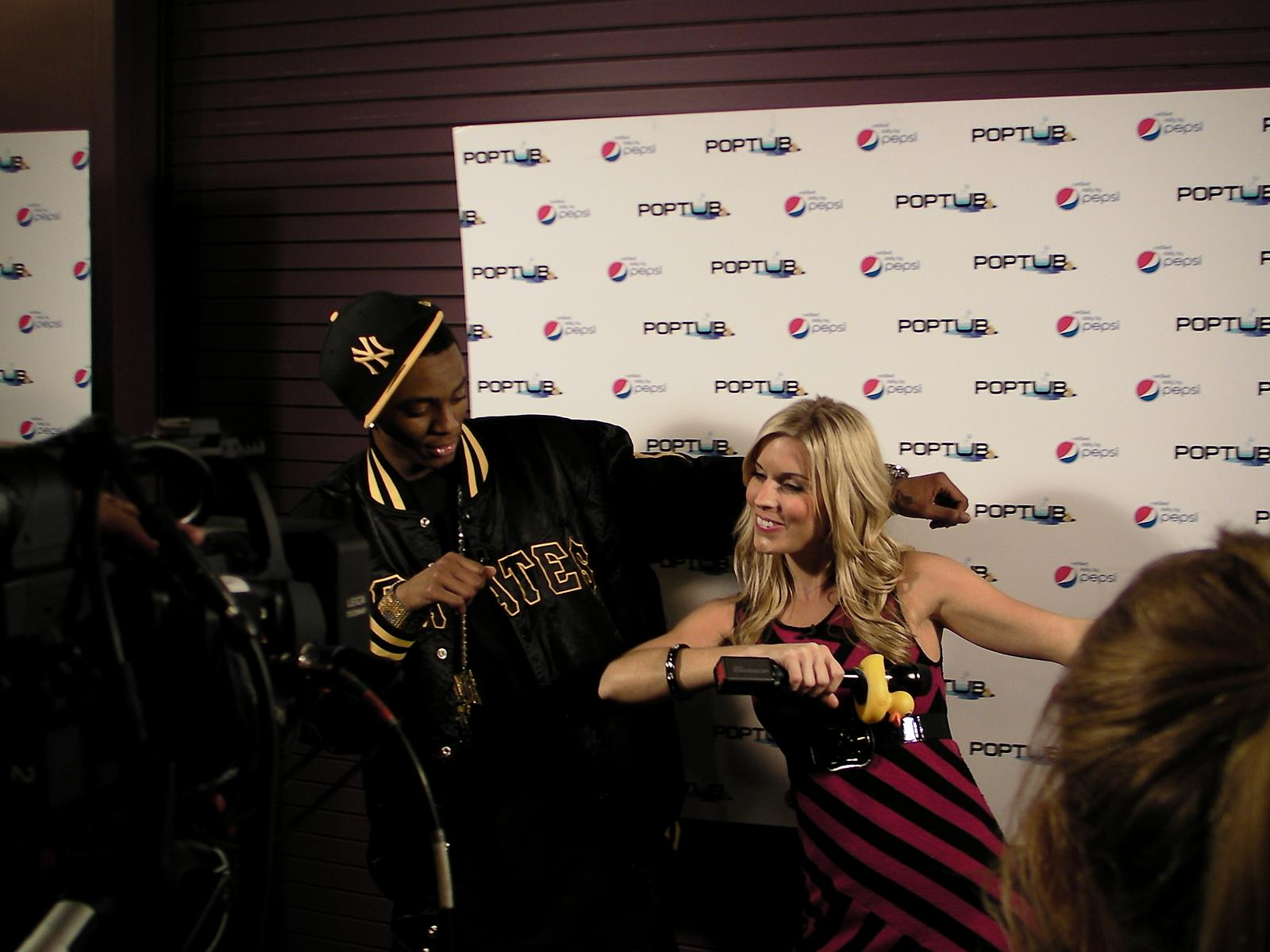
Soulja Boy's 2007 debut single "Crank That" was considered the biggest dance fad since the Macarena.

In late 2005, the Southern hip-hop subgenre reached the peak of its popularity, especially its sub-subgenres of crunk and snap music (which started the dance craze movement in hip-hop from 2005 to 2009). The number one selling crunk artist as well as paving the way to its popularity was Lil Jon who shot to fame in 2003, with his group The East Side Boyz. Then snap music became a staple for the remainder of the decade in hip-hop with artists such as, Dem Franchize Boyz, D4L, Yung Joc, Soulja Boy, Unk, Jibbs, Da BackWudz, Purple Ribbon All-Stars, V.I.C., GS Boyz, the Fast Life Yungstaz, New Boyz, and Cali Swag District, to name a few. These artists have all contributed to starting some dance craze accompanied to one of their songs, with the most popular being Soulja's "Crank Dat" move, which gained popularity throughout 2007 and 2008. By the end of the decade this sound began to decline in popularity as well as the dance-crazes that came along with them, as pioneer hip-hop artists and hip-hop purists such as Ice-T and Nas denouncing the crunk and snap craze, with Nas's 2006 song "Hip Hop Is Dead" brought dislike to the new path hip-hop was directing. CeeLo Green rose to fame with hit single "Crazy" in 2006.

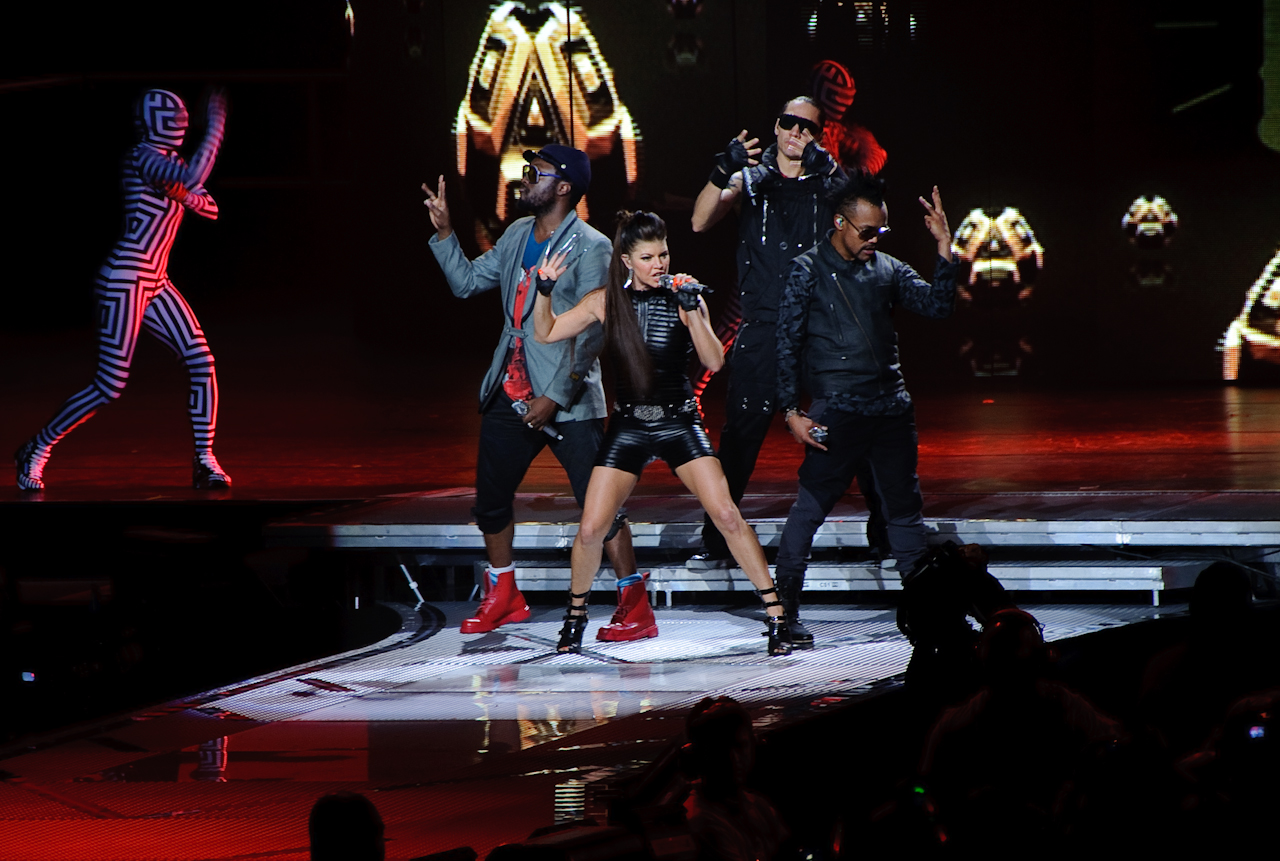
The Black Eyed Peas began utilizing Auto-Tune and electropop–dance in their most successful album to date, The E.N.D., which spawned five top ten hit singles.

By early 2000, the hyphy movement became popular in Northern California, specifically the Bay Area. Bay Area artists like Mac Dre, Keak Da Sneak, E-40, The Pack, and Too Short were prominent hyphy rappers. Hyphy culture included the use of party drugs like ecstasy, slang terms like "Go dumb" and "yadadamean", Ghost Riding, and Sideshows.

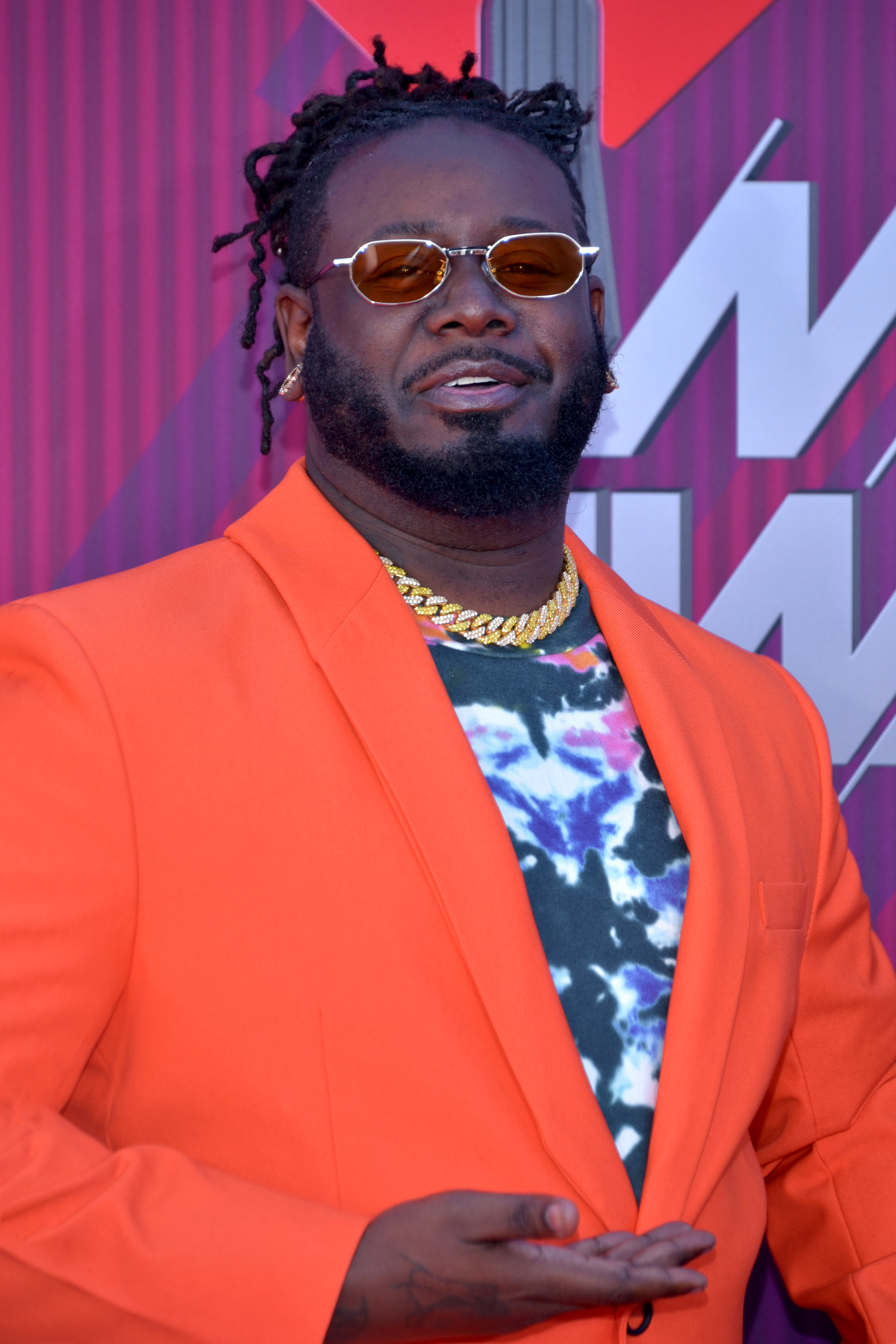
T-Pain was initially criticized for popularizing autotune, which is now considered an iconic trend of the decade.

By mid-2008, the sound began to fade as indie rap and alternative began to come in with artists such as Kid Cudi and The Cool Kids, who fused hip-hop with electro and hipster influences. This trend continued on into the early 2010s. Alternative hip-hop, almost unknown in the mainstream, except for a few crossover acts, evolved throughout the decade with the help of artists such as El-P, Mos Def, Lupe Fiasco, The Roots, MF Doom, Aesop Rock, and Common, who achieved unheard-of success for their field. Throughout the 2000s, alternative hip-hop continued its philosophical, positive, and complex lyrical subject matter, while denouncing materialism, fashion, and money. This subgenre also includes spoken word and a branch of slam poetry. The subgenre could be said to be related to both the old school hip-hop culture of the 1980s and 1990s, and the indie rock and hipster subcultures.

Auto-Tune became popular by mid-2007, with R&B artist T-Pain starting the craze. This technology was not exclusively used for hip-hop music, it was used in other genres such as pop, R&B, and EDM. Auto-Tune was popular in the earlier part of the decade as well (primarily in 2000 and 2001), but then only called "synthesizer" and it was used casually as just an effect. Artists such as Daft Punk, Eiffel 65, *NSYNC, 98 Degrees, Willa Ford, and even Faith Hill have used Auto-Tune in their songs. It was first known as the "Cher effect" since it was used in the song "Believe" by Cher in 1998. The Black Eyed Peas began utilizing Auto-Tune and electropop–dance in their most successful album to date, The E.N.D., which spawned five top ten hit singles: "Boom Boom Pow", "I Gotta Feeling", "Meet Me Halfway", "Imma Be", and "Rock That Body". Due to hip-hop's increased moulding with pop music, some, such as rapper Nas have declared the death of the genre.

=== Rock ===
==== Pop rock ====
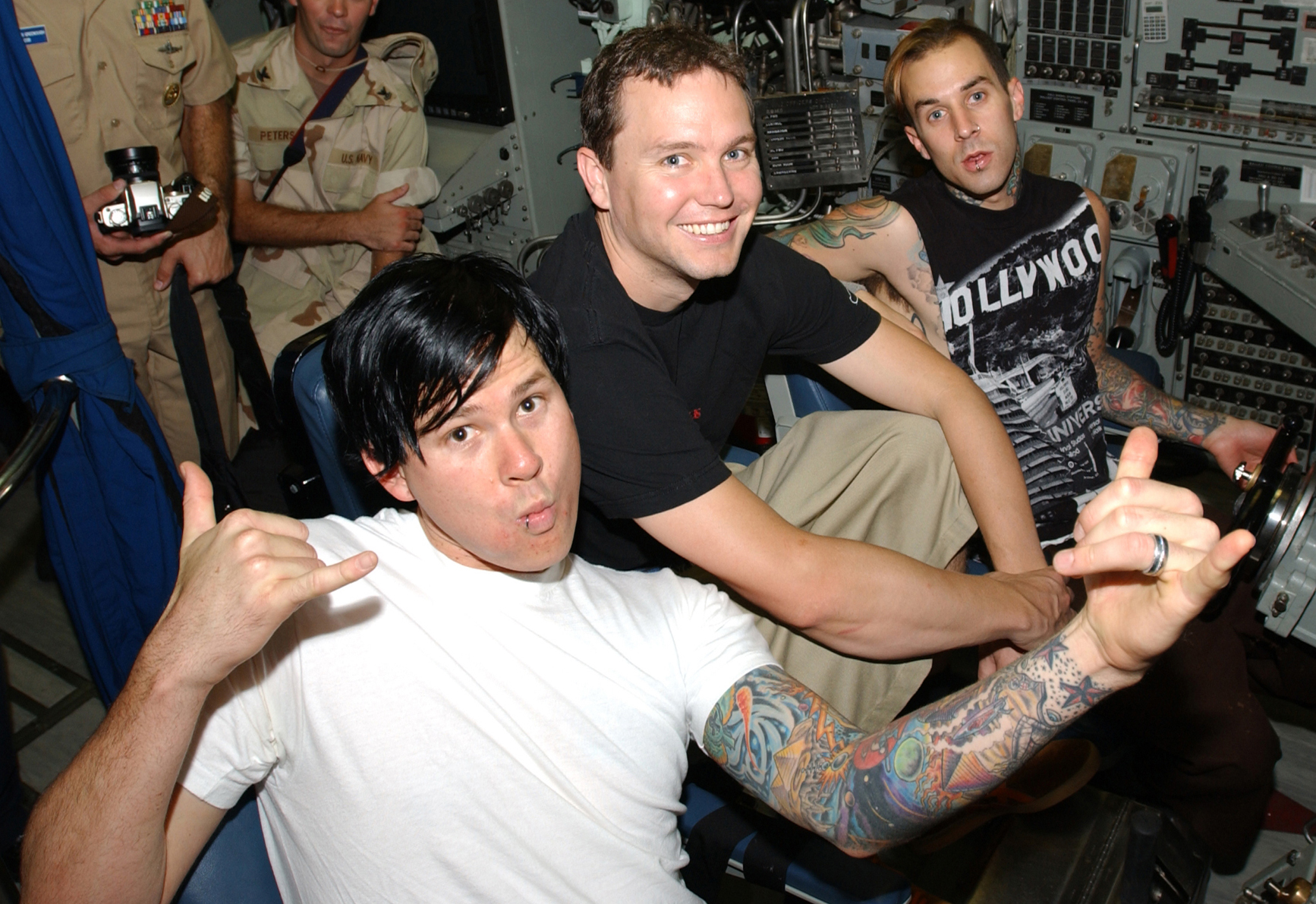
Blink-182's song "All the Small Things" kickstarted a resurgence of interest in pop rock.

In the early 2000s, there was a resurgence of interest in pop rock and power pop. This was kickstarted in the year 2000 with the success of Blink-182's song "All the Small Things" and Nine Days' song "Absolutely (Story of a Girl)", both of which peaked at No. 6 on the Billboard Hot 100. The trend kicked off the brief musical careers of Ryan Cabrera, Ashley Parker Angel, Teddy Geiger, Evan and Jaron, The Click Five, Jet, and Snow Patrol throughout the early and mid-2000s. This also paved the way for a second wave of pop-punk bands such as Good Charlotte, New Found Glory, and Sum 41, who made use of humor in their videos and had a radio-friendly tone to their music. Later pop-punk bands such as Simple Plan, The All-American Rejects, and Fall Out Boy had a sound that had been described as closer to late 1970s and early 1980s hardcore, with similarities to the band Cheap Trick, while still achieving considerable commercial success. In addition, some of the most successful pop-punk bands of the 1990s, such as Green Day, Blink-182, Weezer, and The Offspring continued their success during the early 2000s.

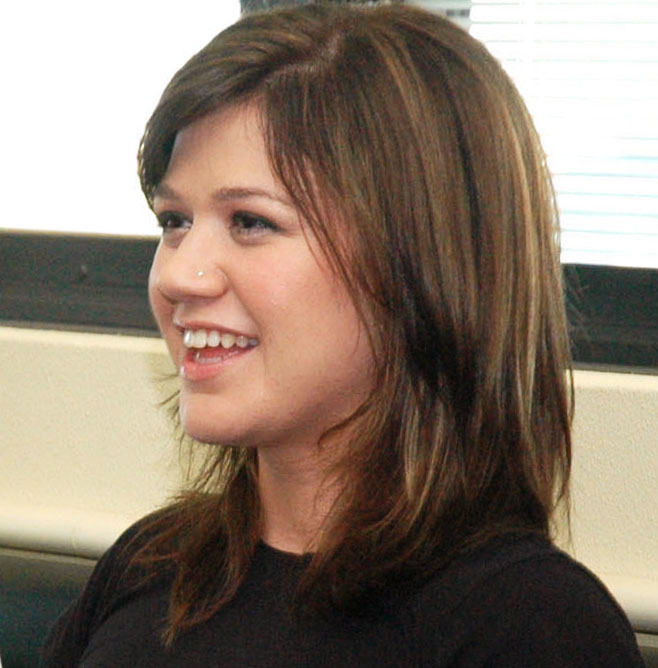
American Idol winner Kelly Clarkson is the most successful winner of American Idol and a key artist in the power pop and pop rock movement of the 2000s.

Some pop rock and alternative bands emerged with having at least one big hit such as Wheatus with "Teenage Dirtbag" in 2000, Trapt with "Headstrong" in 2002,The Calling with "Wherever You Will Go" in 2001, Fountains of Wayne with "Stacy's Mom" and Finger Eleven with "One Thing" in 2003, Howie Day with "Collide" and Bowling for Soup with "1985" in 2004, Hinder with "Lips of an Angel", Plain White T's with "Hey There Delilah" in 2006.

In the early 2000s, the power pop and pop rock trend also spread to women musicians. Michelle Branch became successful in 2001 with her song "Everywhere". Her success continued with her second album singles "Are You Happy Now?" and "Breathe". Kelly Clarkson was also another prominent female artist of this movement, rivaling the success of Avril Lavigne. The first winner on the hit reality TV show American Idol, Clarkson started off her musical career with contemporary R&B hit songs such as "A Moment Like This" and "Miss Independent" and catapulted to cultural icon status in the mid-2000s with aggressive songs such as "Since U Been Gone" and "Behind These Hazel Eyes". Clarkson strayed away from this sound in the late 2000s but continued to make pop rock hits. Other female pop rock and power pop artists who experienced Top 40 success in the 2000s included Alanis Morissette, Liz Phair, Ashlee Simpson, and Stacie Orrico.Daniel Powter rose to fame with his debut single, "Bad Day" in 2005.Maroon 5 also rose to prominence with their debut album Songs About Jane in 2005, earning them Grammy Award for Best New Artist. In 2007, under Mosley Music Group (an imprint of Interscope Records at the time), OneRepublic released their debut album, Dreaming Out Loud. Its lead single, "Apologize", was remixed by the label's founder Timbaland, becoming a huge international success, reaching number one in sixteen countries and subsequently earning them a Grammy Award nomination.

==== Pop punk ====
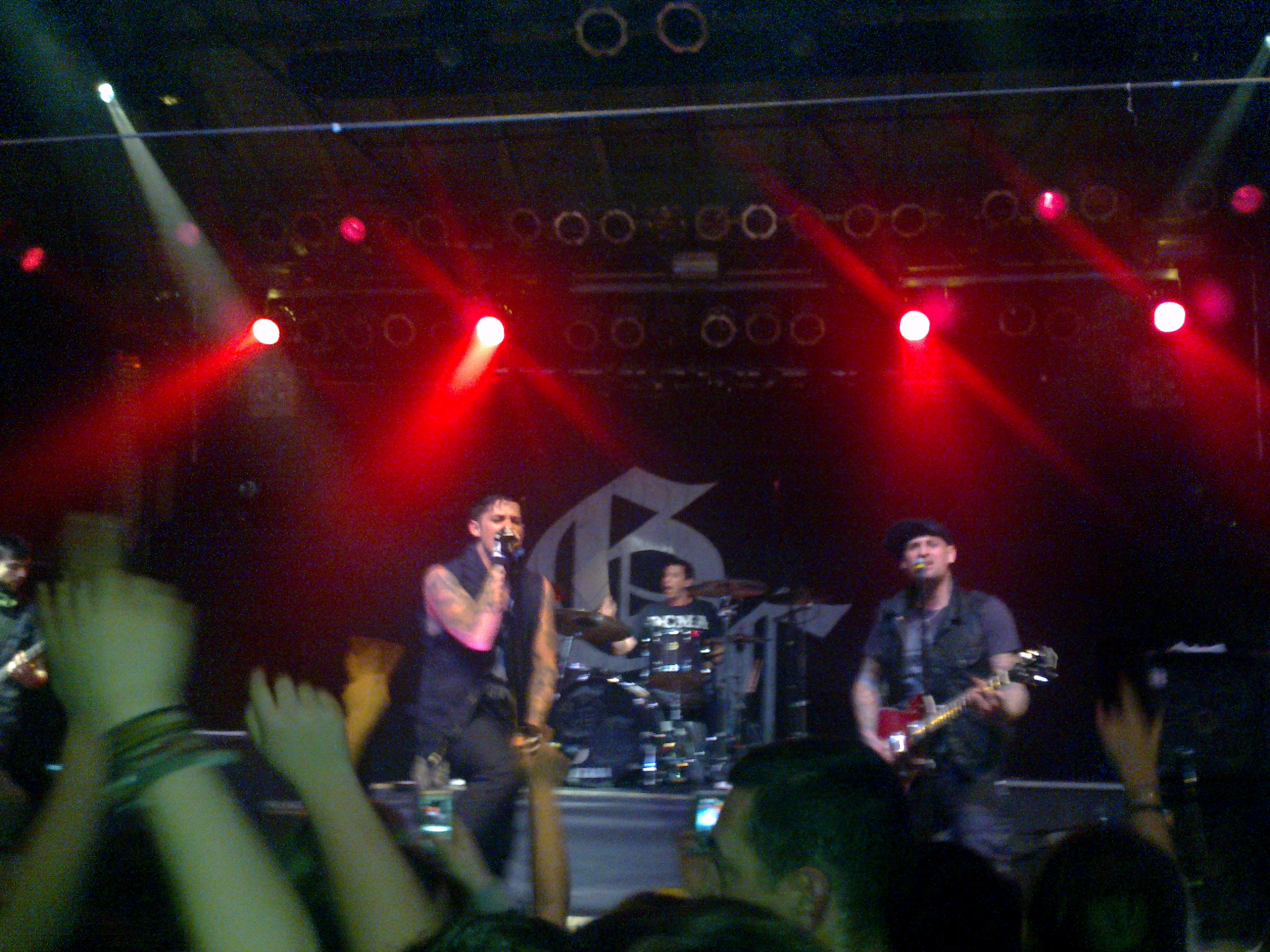
Good Charlotte received platinum status and gained a large fan base worldwide.

After the breakthrough of punk rock in the 1990s, by the 2000s the genre had evolved more into pop-punk due to major label records taking interest and signing on bands such as Blink-182. Green Day kick-started the 2000s with the release of their sixth studio album Warning in 2000 to lukewarm success. The following year, Blink-182 released their fourth studio album Take Off Your Pants and Jacket in 2001 which went on to sell 14 million copies worldwide. It was a commercial and critical success, debuting at No. 1 on the Billboard 200 within its first week of release and securing the status of the pop punk trio as one of biggest bands of the genre. Also in that year, Canadian band Sum 41 released their debut album All Killer No Filler, which went platinum in the United States. The second-wave bands dominated the pop punk genre in the early years with bands like Good Charlotte, New Found Glory, Simple Plan, Busted and Sum 41 receiving platinum status and gaining large fan bases worldwide.

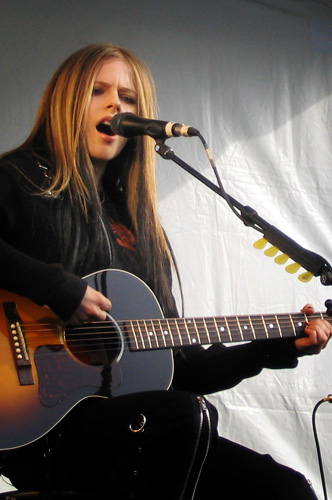
Canadian Avril Lavigne was the biggest breakthrough of the 2000s worldwide with 40 million albums sold.

In 2002, Avril Lavigne became popular in the pop-punk scene thanks to her pop punk-based sound, and was arguably the most prominent artist to take this new direction in pop music, with hits such as "Complicated" and "Sk8er Boi". In 2003, Blink-182 released their self-titled album blink-182, which demonstrated a darker and more mature tone than previous albums. This was mainly due to the side-project Box Car Racer. Even so, the album was yet another commercial and critical success. It was to be their last album released before taking an indefinite hiatus in 2005. The band would reunite four years later. After their 1994 breakthrough, Green Day's fame was fading, mainly due to rising popularity of other bands like Good Charlotte and Sum 41. Realizing this, they retreated to the studio and produced their seventh studio album American Idiot released in 2004. It saw a significant sales boost, selling 14 million copies worldwide and awarding the band 3 Grammy awards. Fall Out Boy's From Under the Cork Tree gained commercial success in 2005 and put the band on the pop punk map. Fall Out Boy's follow-up album Infinity on High went No.1 on the Billboard 200 in 2007. The last successful pop punk album of the decade was Green Day's eighth studio album 21st Century Breakdown released in 2009 which achieved their best chart performance to date by reaching number one on the album charts of various countries as well as winning a Grammy, including the U.S. Billboard 200, the European Top 100 Albums, and the UK Albums Chart.

==== Post-grunge ====
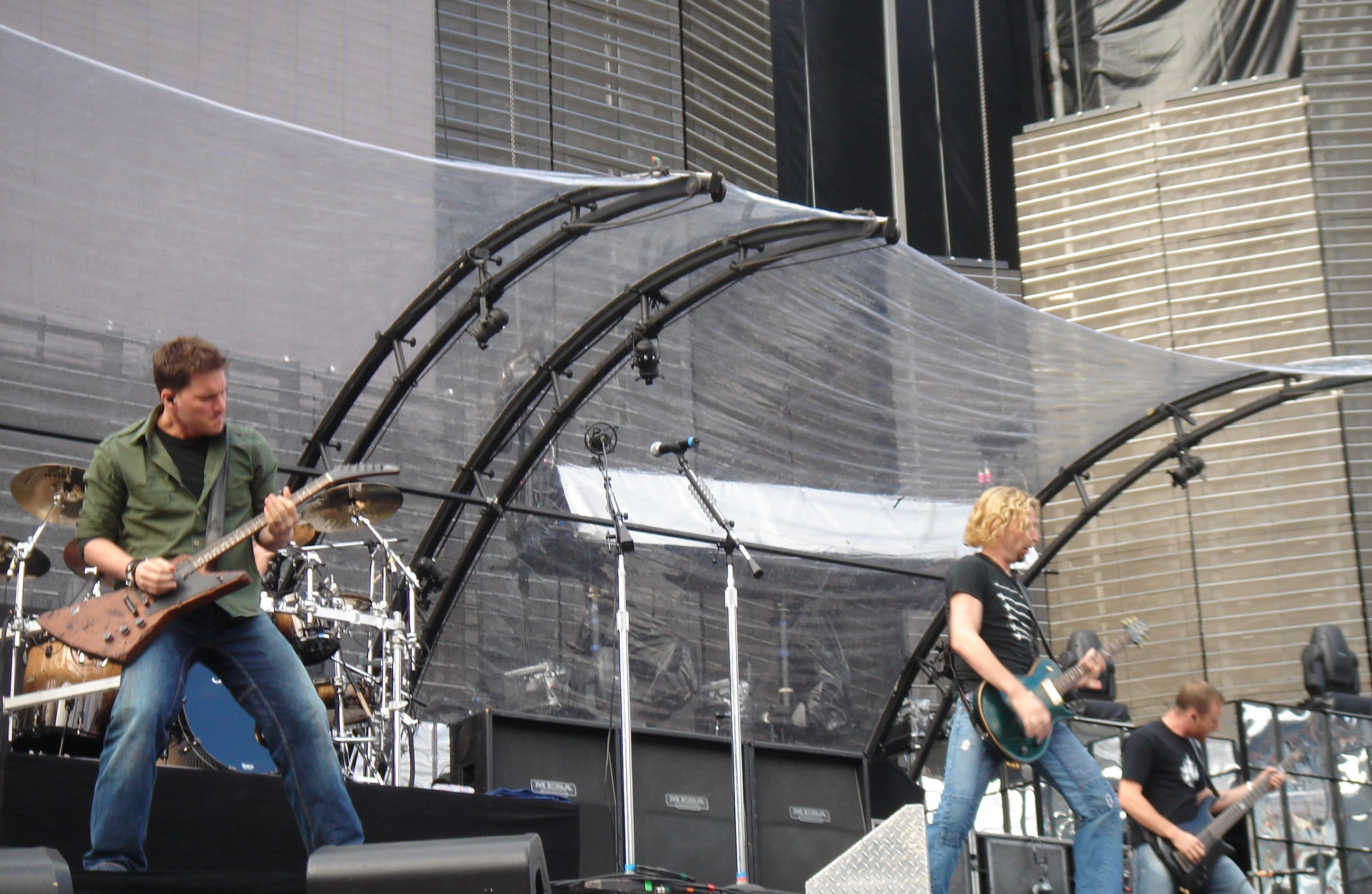
Nickelback has sold over 50 million albums and was one of the biggest post-grunge bands of the decade.

Post-grunge continued to be popular in the 2000s, with the genre reaching its peak in the early years of the decade. Artists include Foo Fighters, Creed, Alter Bridge, Nickelback, Lifehouse, Hoobastank, 3 Doors Down, Puddle of Mudd, Our Lady Peace, Switchfoot, Shinedown, Three Days Grace, Staind, Seether, and Daughtry. These bands took post-grunge into the 21st century with considerable commercial success, at times abandoning the angst and anger of the original movement for more conventional anthems, narratives, ballads and romantic songs.

==== Nu metal ====
During the early 2000s, a new wave of metal began with interest in the newly emerging genre nu metal and genres of a similar style such as rap metal and the later mainstream success rap rock. The popularity of nu metal music carried over from the late 1990s, where it was introduced by early work from bands such as Korn, Deftones, Limp Bizkit, Slipknot, Incubus, Coal Chamber, and Rage Against the Machine into the early 2000s with the similar genre, rap rock, bringing in a wave of monster-hit artists such as System of a Down, Evanescence, P.O.D, Linkin Park, Papa Roach, and Disturbed.

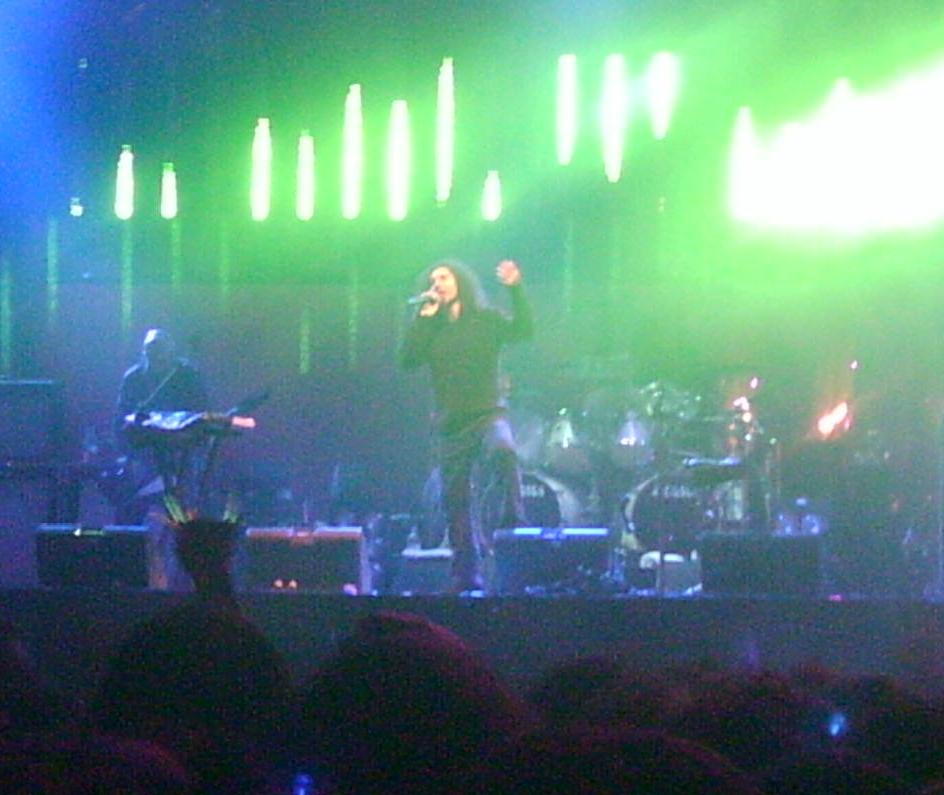
Three of System of a Down's albums debuted at number one on the US Billboard 200.

The success of Korn's third studio album, Follow the Leader and Limp Bizkit's Significant Other and Chocolate Starfish and the Hot Dog Flavored Water, brought nu metal to the mainstream. Limp Bizkit's Chocolate Starfish and the Hot Dog Flavored Water would sell over 1,050,000 in its first week – making it the highest selling rock record with first week sales ever. Linkin Park's debut album Hybrid Theory, released in 2000, sold over 24 million copies worldwide. Beginning in 2005, nu metal rapidly began to lose mainstream appeal. Since then, many bands have changed to other genres of music, such as post-grunge (Staind), heavy metal (Slipknot, Disturbed, Drowning Pool), and alternative rock (Linkin Park, Papa Roach).

==== Metalcore ====
By 2004, the up-and-coming genre metalcore was dominated by bands such as Killswitch Engage, Underoath, Bullet for My Valentine, Trivium, and most successfully Avenged Sevenfold, all of whom releasing successful albums.

The rise of metalcore led to increased popularity and exposure of nearly every other subgenre of heavy metal including death metal, black metal, and thrash. In 2002, heavy metal saw a new subgenre called deathcore, which would gain moderate success from 2005 to present day.

==== Hard rock/Heavy metal ====
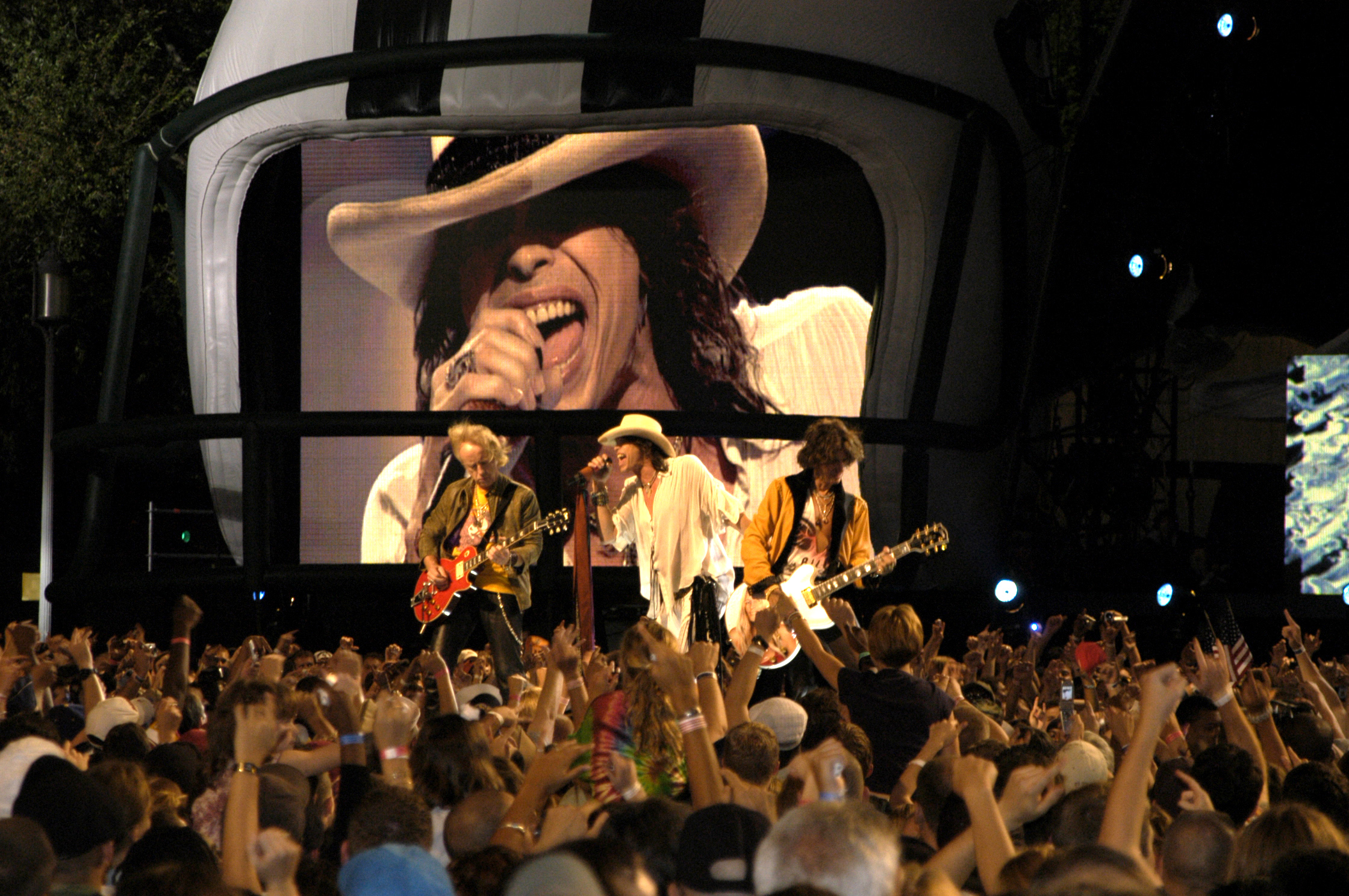
Aerosmith toured for every year of the 2000s except 2008.

AC/DC released Stiff Upper Lip in 2000 and Black Ice in 2008. Guns N' Roses released the long-awaited Chinese Democracy in 2008 after over a decade of work by Axl Rose. Metallica released two albums in the 2000s, St. Anger in 2003 and Death Magnetic in 2008. Aerosmith released the platinum-selling Just Push Play in 2001 followed by the blues-infused Honkin' on Bobo in 2004; the band also toured every year of the decade except 2008.

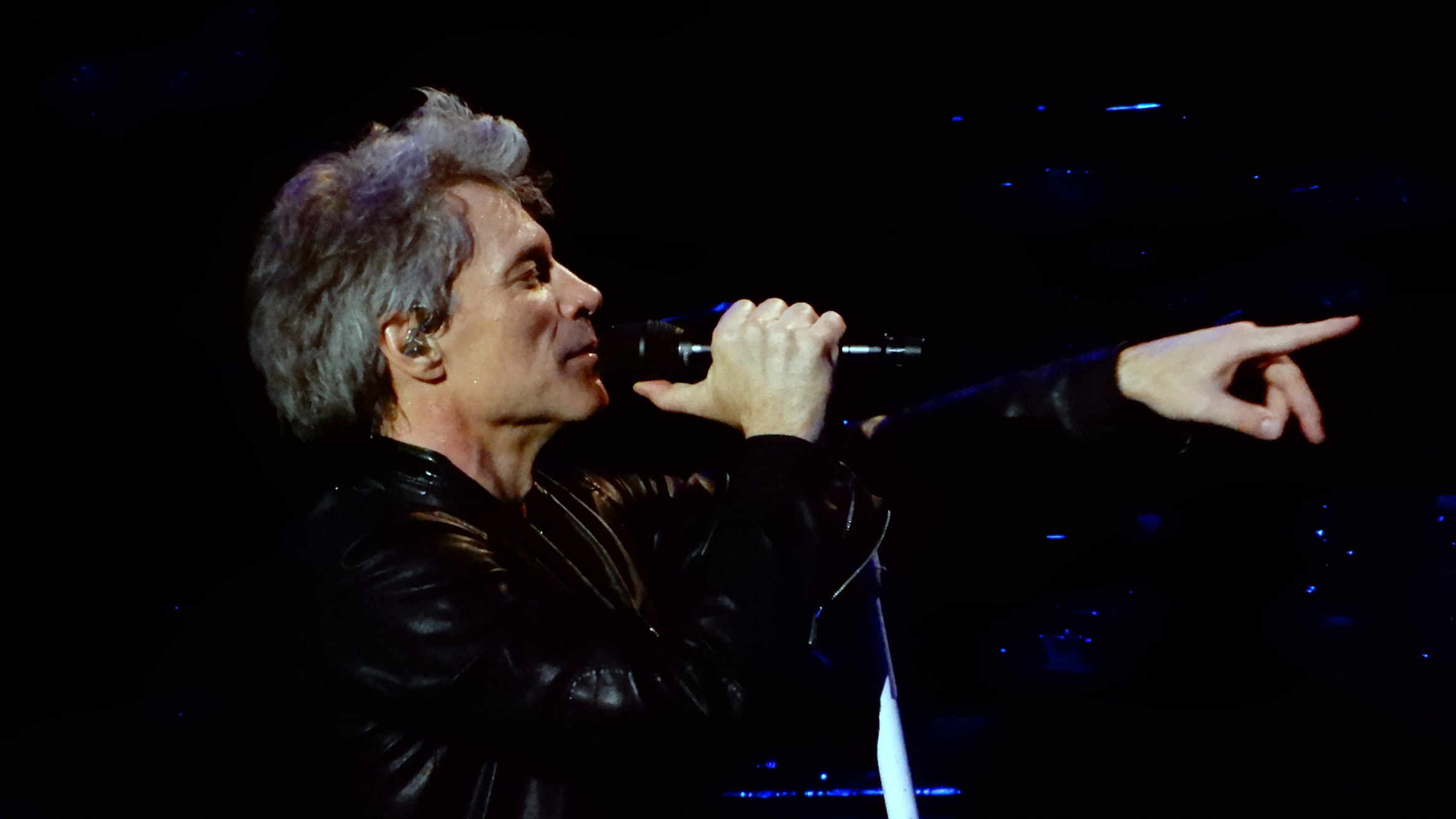
Bon Jovi's Lost Highway Tour was the highest-grossing tour of 2008.

Bon Jovi released five albums during the decade: Crush (2000), Bounce (2002), Have a Nice Day (2005), Lost Highway (2007), and The Circle (2009). Crush fared best, going double platinum, and spawning the hit "It's My Life", while Have a Nice Day and Lost Highway also launched Top 40 singles, went platinum, and saw the band mix hard rock with country. Bon Jovi's Lost Highway Tour was the highest-grossing tour of 2008.

==== Emo ====
Emo broke into mainstream culture in the early 2000s with the platinum-selling success of Jimmy Eat World's Bleed American. The new emo had a far greater appeal amongst adolescents than its earlier incarnations. In the following years, use of the term "emo" expanded beyond the music world, becoming associated with fashion, hairstyle, and other aesthetic attributes of culture.

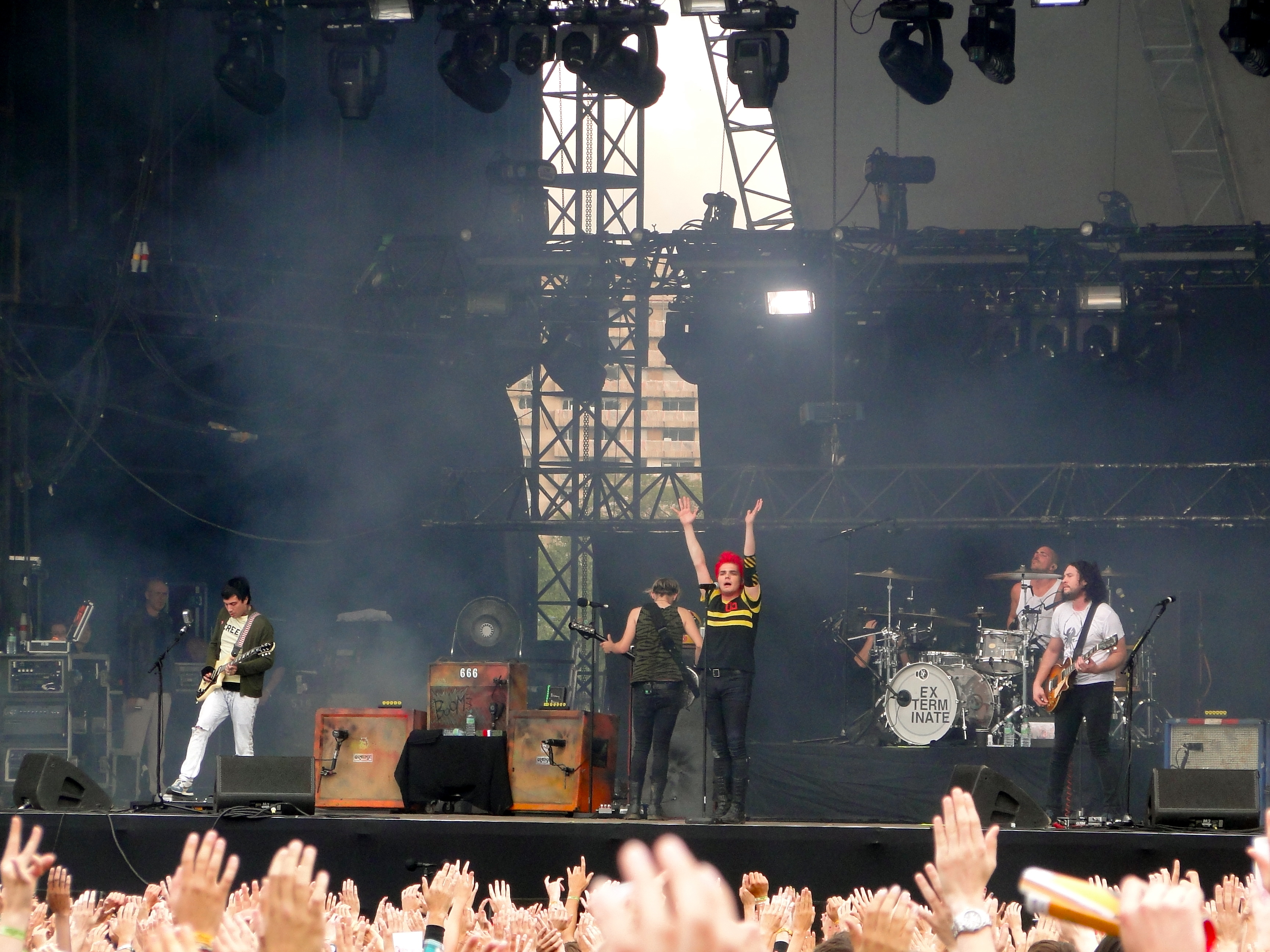
My Chemical Romance is considered one of the most influential rock groups of the 2000s and a major act in the pop-punk and emo genres, despite the band rejecting the latter label.

Later in the decade, the term "emo" was applied by critics and journalists to a variety of artists, including multi-platinum acts such as Fall Out Boy and My Chemical Romance and disparate groups such as Paramore and Panic! at the Disco, although some artists branded as such rejected the label. Despite its success, the emo genre never quite surpassed post-grunge in popularity during the 2000s.

==== Garage rock, post-punk and new wave revival ====
In the early 2000s, a new group of bands emerged into the mainstream which drew primary inspiration from post–punk and new wave and were variously characterized as part of a garage rock, post–punk, or new wave revival. Because the bands came from across the globe, cited diverse influences (from traditional blues, through new wave to grunge), and adopted differing styles of dress, their unity as a genre has been disputed. There had been attempts to revive garage rock and elements of punk in the 1980s and 1990s and by 2000 scenes had grown up in several countries. The Detroit rock scene included The Von Bondies, Electric Six, The Dirtbombs, and The Detroit Cobras and that of New York which included Radio 4, Yeah Yeah Yeahs, and The Rapture. Social networking sites such as Myspace and PureVolume enabled amateur artists to promote their music, and thanks to the internet, many underground unsigned artists become discovered and well known amongst alternative subcultures. The revival hit a peak in 2003–04. Franz Ferdinand from Scotland, also became popular with their debut album in 2004. Though drawing on an indie sound, none of the groups were derivative in a way that could be described as retro. In 2004, Las Vegas-based alternative rock band The Killers released their successful debut album Hot Fuss, spawning hits like "Mr. Brightside" and "All These Things That I've Done". New York-based act The Bravery became popular the following year.

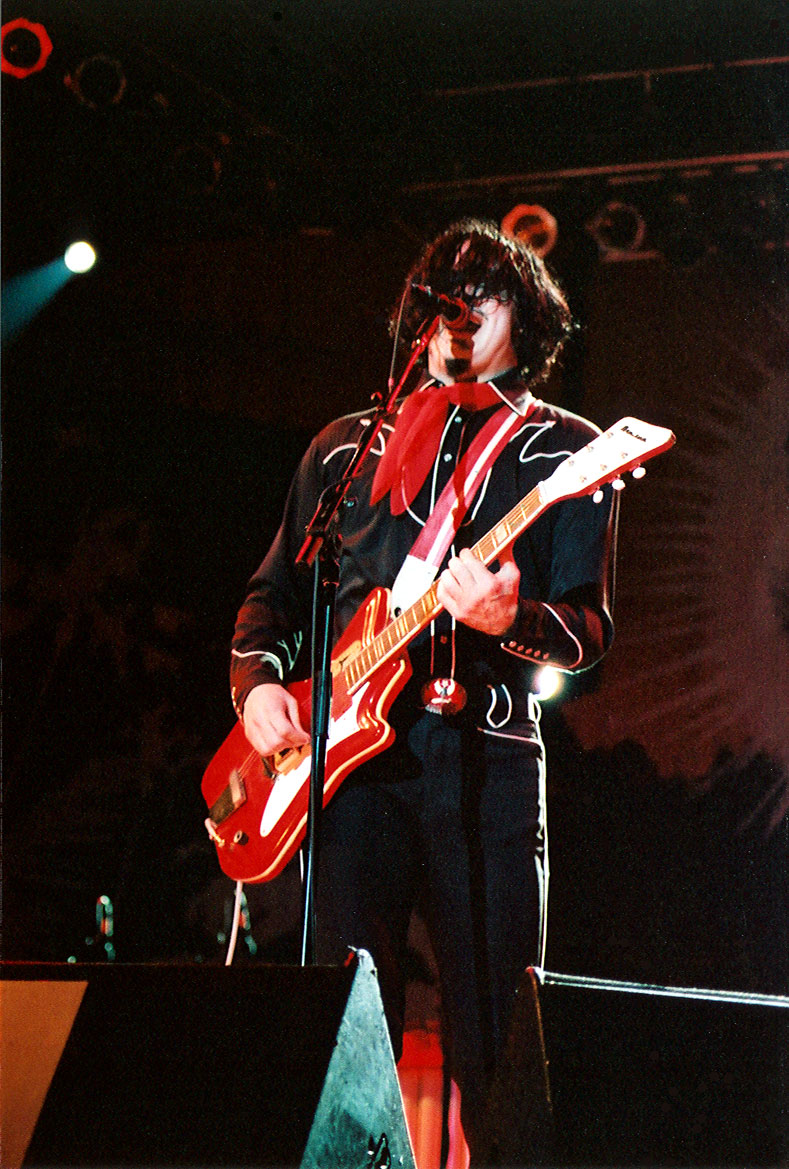
The White Stripes' signature instruments were the JB Hutto Montgomery Airline guitar and Ludwig Drums with Paiste cymbals.

Three of the most successful bands from these scenes were The Strokes, who emerged from the New York club scene with their debut album Is This It (2001); The White Stripes, from Detroit, with their third album White Blood Cells (2001); and Interpol from New York, with their debut album Turn On the Bright Lights (2002). They were christened by the media as the "The" bands, and dubbed "The saviors of rock 'n' roll", because of their connections with the indie rock underground, leading to accusations of hype. Other popular "The" bands were The Hives, The Vines, and The Darkness; as well as Jet, whose 2003 smash-hit "Are You Gonna Be My Girl" catapulted to the top of the charts and was frequently used in commercials primarily for music products such as the Apple iPod. Canadian punk band, Sum 41 poked fun at the start of the "The" band craze in their music video for "Still Waiting" in 2003 off the album Does This Look Infected? (2002). Will Sasso makes a cameo in the video, coining the band as "The Sums".

==== Indie rock ====
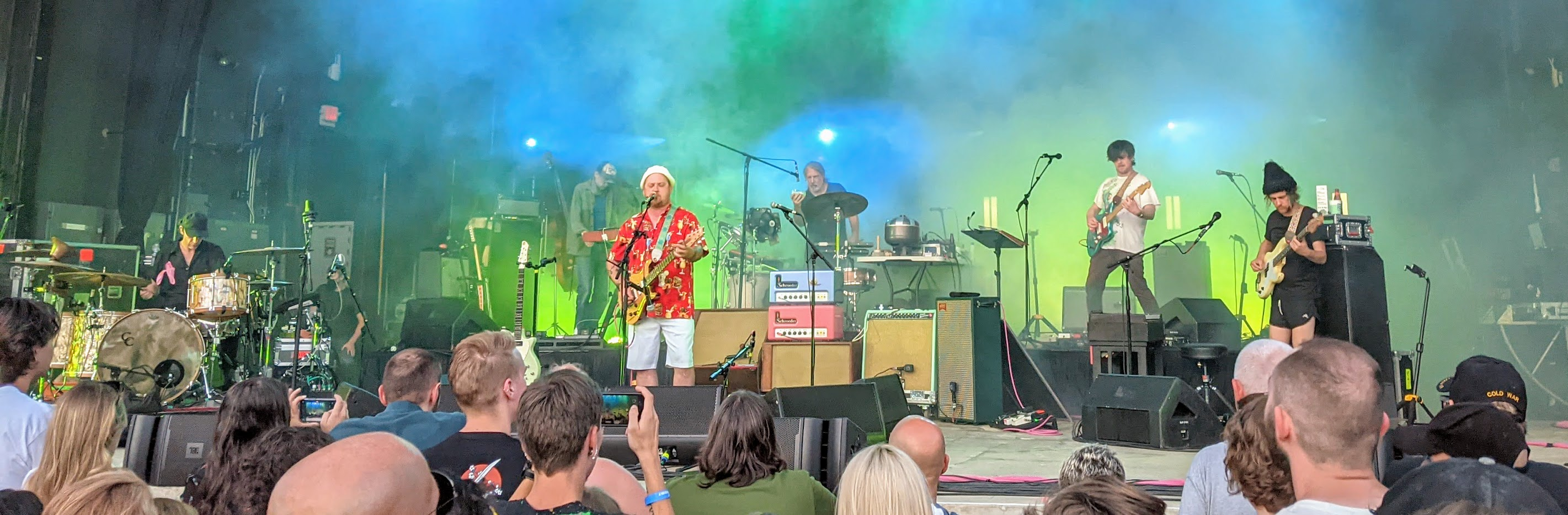
Modest Mouse

During the mid-2000s, bands such as Modest Mouse, Death Cab for Cutie and Arcade Fire released indie rock albums that broke into the mainstream and gave indie rock recognition. The late 2000s also saw more indie rock bands such as MGMT, Spoon, Interpol, Tegan and Sara, Wilco, The Decemberists, The White Stripes, The Strokes, Animal Collective, Bright Eyes, Rilo Kiley, She & Him, HiM, The New Pornographers, Feist, Cat Power, Grizzly Bear, Arcade Fire, The Shins, The Killers, and Vampire Weekend gain popularity around the world, including in the United States, thanks to the rise of independent internet music blogs. The rising popularity of Internet radio also contributed to high album sales for Indie rock bands, despite little to no mainstream radio play. By the end of the decade several of these bands released albums that topped the Billboard 200. This trend has been viewed as heralding a new era for rock in the wake of an era of pop dominance by the likes of Lady Gaga and Katy Perry.

=== Pop ===
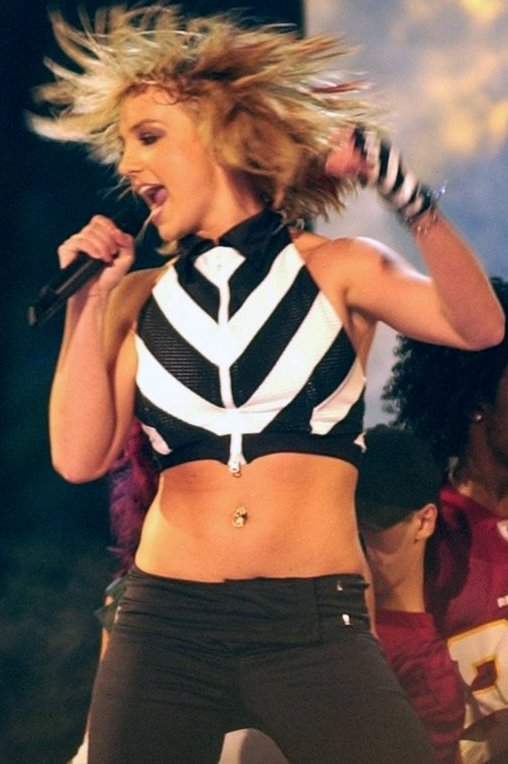
Britney Spears was the best-selling female artist of the decade.

Teen pop continued to be an extremely popular genre in the early 2000s with success of teenage pop singers Britney Spears and Christina Aguilera. Spears' "Oops!... I Did It Again" and Aguilera's "Come On Over Baby (All I Want Is You)" became huge hits in the year 2000. By 2001 and 2002, however, the teen-pop trend faded due to modern R&B and hip-hop influenced music that later dominated throughout the middle of the decade. Spears' 2001 album Britney and Aguilera's 2002 album Stripped are examples of teen pop artists transitioning from teen pop to more grown-up, modern R&B influenced records.

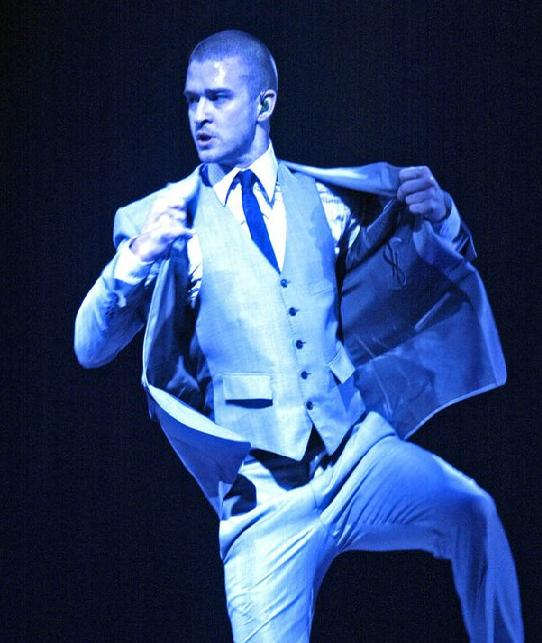
Justin Timberlake was one of the best-selling male artists of the decade.

Boy bands maintained their popularity during the beginning of the decade, but their popularity also faded, with the exception of Backstreet Boys, who continued their popularity post–2005, (after a short hiatus between 2002 and 2004). As the typical "boy band" sound was no longer mainstream, they began to transition to more of an adult contemporary, soft-rock and ballad styles of music for the remainder of the decade. By 2003, records by boy bands were very sparse on the Billboard Hot 100, and some members of boy bands left to pursue other projects and solo endeavors, such as Jesse McCartney from Dream Street, Nick Lachey from 98 Degrees, and most successfully Justin Timberlake from NSYNC, whose foray into Blue-eyed soul R&B/Pop spawned a successful solo career. A new strain of boy bands, such as 2gether, Plus One, O-Town, V Factory, Varsity Fanclub, The Click Five, NLT, and the Jonas Brothers, emerged at the end of the decade, but this new generation of boy bands did not reach the glamor and success of those of the 1990s and early 2000s.

Along with the boy bands, girl groups were popular as well with groups such as The Pussycat Dolls and Destiny's Child. Other girl groups included Danity Kane (2005–09), Dream (2000–03), and Sugababes, along with shorter-term girl groups such as No Secrets, A Girl Called Jane, Girlicious, Soluna, and Paradiso Girls.

Pop rock artist Pink, who would go on to be one of the biggest pop singers of the 2000s, released her debut album Can't Take Me Home in 2000, her second studio album Missundaztood, and later, her I'm Not Dead album in which features "Stupid Girls" and "Who Knew". Her following album, Funhouse, released in 2008 also included "So What" and "Sober". Pink's song, "You Make Me Sick", which debuted January 6, 2001, reached No. 33 on the Hot100 list. "Family Portrait" got up to No. 20, debuting on November 16, 2002.

Singer Anastacia achieved worldwide commercial success with singles such as "Not That Kind", "I'm Outta Love", "Paid My Dues", "One Day in Your Life", and "Left Outside Alone". She was highly successful in Europe, Australia, New Zealand, Asia, South Africa, and South America, but had only minor success in her native United States. She is one of the fastest and biggest-selling artists of the new millennium. Singers like Jojo, Lisa Marie Presley, Nelly Furtado, Leigh Nash, Lindsay Lohan, Jennifer Love Hewitt, Paris Hilton, Ashley Tisdale, Josh Groban, Michael Bublé, Vienna Teng and Vanessa Carlton enjoyed some success in the early-to-mid 2000s. Gwen Stefani also debuted as a solo artist with two acclaimed albums during the decade.

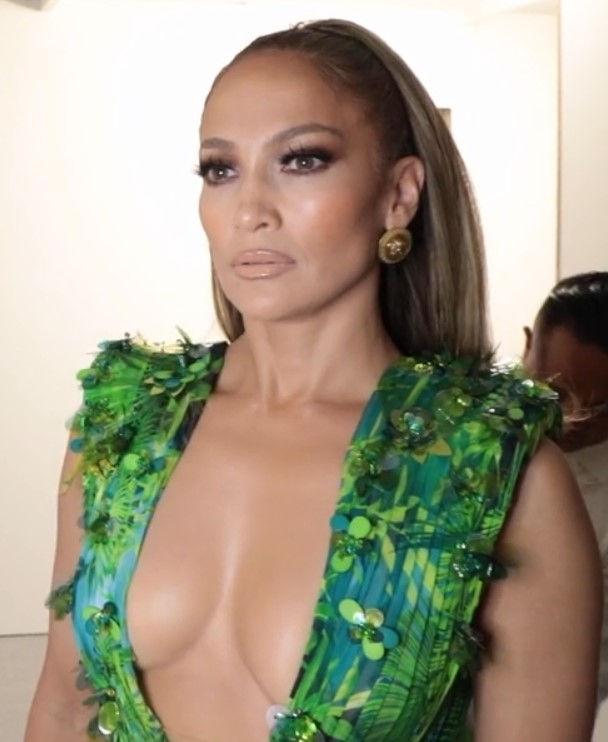
Jennifer Lopez was the first actress and singer in history to have both a film and an album at No. 1 in the same week.

In 2001, triple-threat entertainer Jennifer Lopez debuted at No. 1 on the U.S. Billboard 200 and the Top R&B/Hip-Hop Albums chart with her J.Lo album and in addition her film, The Wedding Planner, opened at No. 1 at the box office at the same time making her the first actress and singer in history to have both a film and an album at No. 1 in the same week.

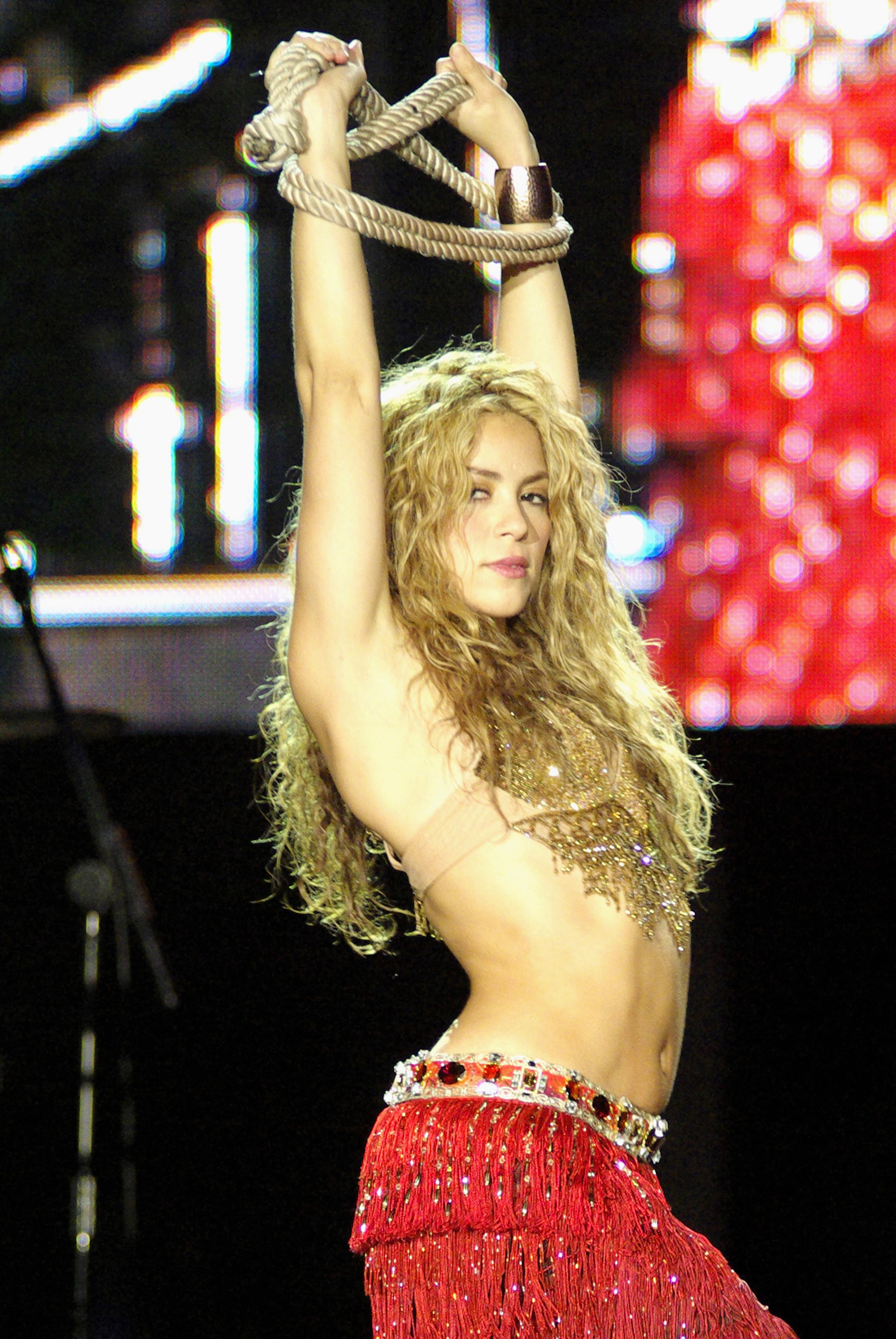
Shakira was the best selling Latin female artist, also one of the best selling women of the decade.

In 2006, Shakira with "Hips Don't Lie" became the first South American woman, also one of the few women ever to have a No. 1 single on the official charts of the United States, Australia, the United Kingdom, and Latin charts. The song is regarded as the best-selling single of the decade, and one of the best-selling singles of all time. Her massive crossover success in 2001 generated many global smash hits throughout the decade like "Whenever, Wherever", "La Tortura", "Hips Don't Lie", "Beautiful Liar", and "She Wolf". Shakira also broke the record for the highest-selling Spanish-language album in the United States with Fijación Oral, Vol. 1.

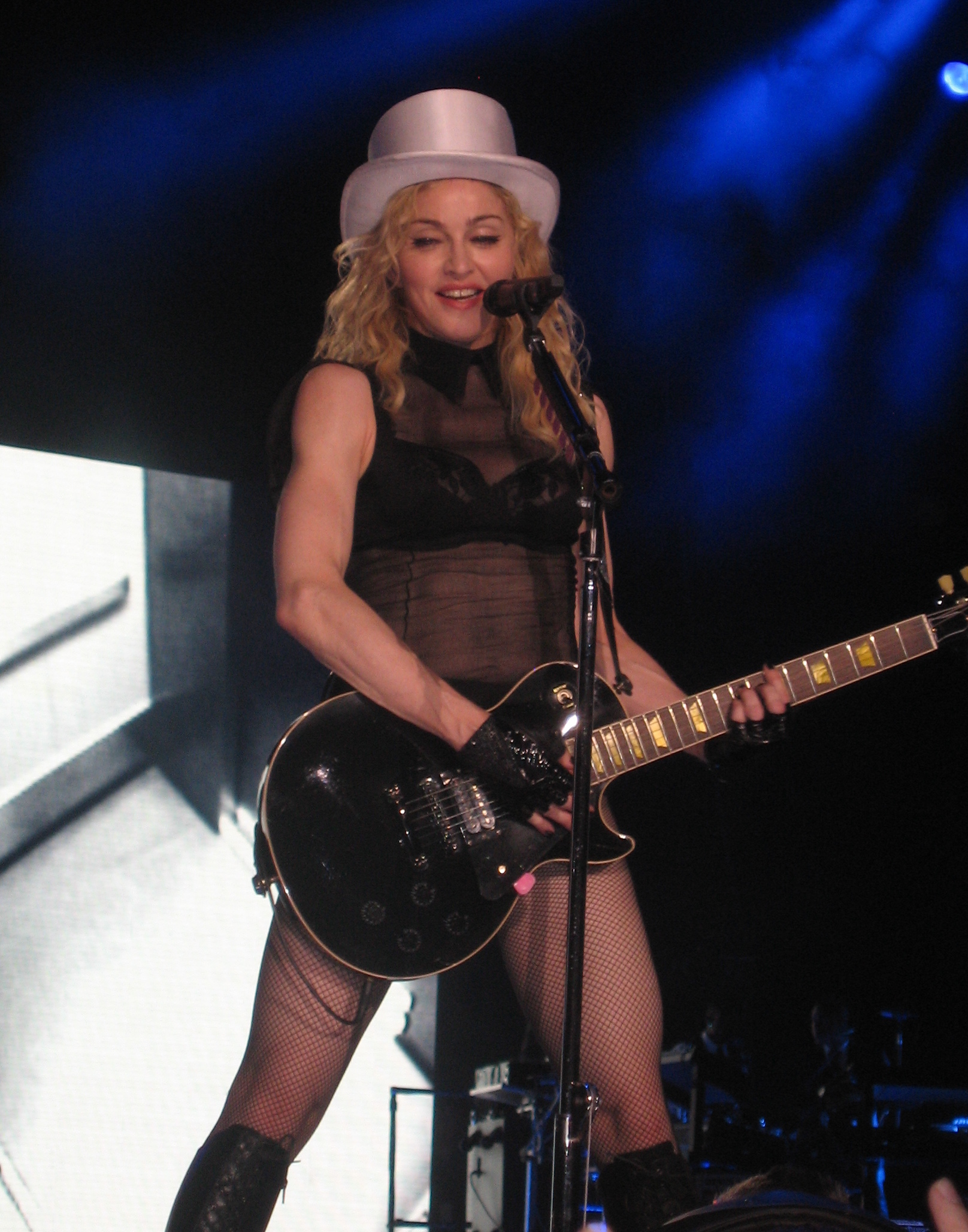
Madonna's Sticky and Sweet Tour became the highest grossing female tour and the highest grossing solo tour of all-time making $408 million in 85 shows.

Artists such as Madonna, Janet Jackson, Anastacia, Kylie Minogue, Mariah Carey, and Nelly Furtado experienced revived success. Justin Timberlake shot to stardom with his debut solo album, Justified (2002). In 2005, Cher ended her 3-year-long Farewell Tour which became the highest grossing female and solo tour at that time. Madonna enjoyed success throughout the decade. Her albums Music (2000) and Confessions on a Dance Floor (2005) are among the best-selling of the decade. Both were universally acclaimed by critics. The first was also nominated for five Grammy Awards while the second won one. Madonna also had four highly successful tours in the 2000s. The Re-Invention Tour which grossed $125 million in just 56 shows making it the highest grossing of 2004, the Confessions Tour went on to gross over $190 million in 60 shows becoming the highest-grossing tour by a female ever. Her final tour in 2008/09 was Sticky and Sweet Tour which became the highest grossing female tour and the highest grossing solo tour of all-time making $408 million in 85 shows.

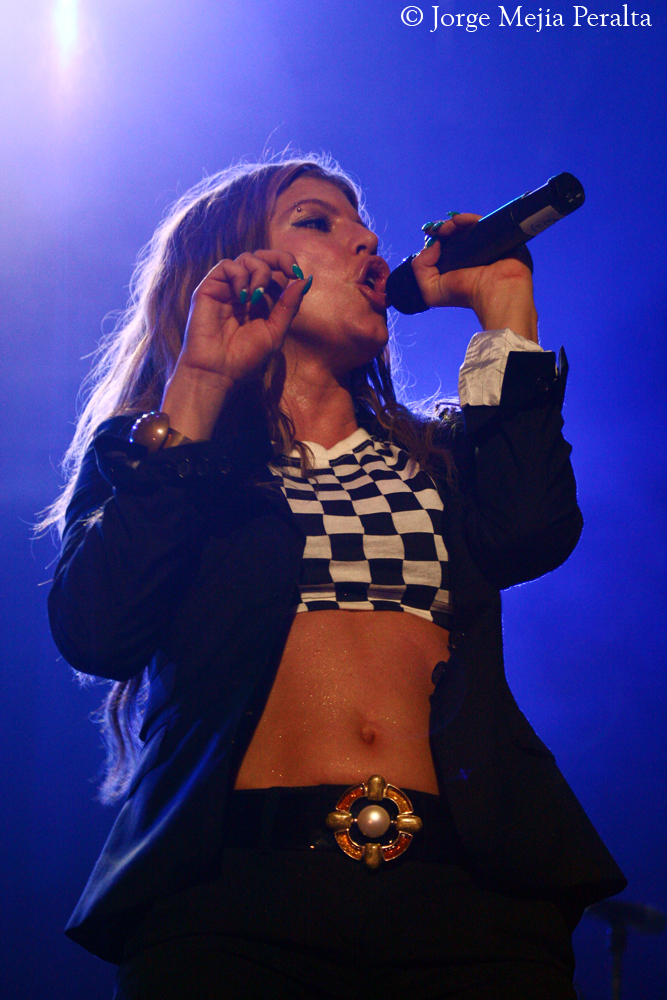
Fergie's The Dutchess sold over 6 million copies worldwide becoming one of the most successful albums of the era.

Justin Timberlake released his sophomore studio album FutureSex/LoveSounds in 2006, producing the chart-topping singles "SexyBack", "My Love", and "What Goes Around... Comes Around", and winning four Grammy Awards for the record.

Fergie released her first solo album in 2006 called The Dutchess. The album produced five top five singles in the United States, including three No. 1 hits on the U.S. Billboard Hot 100, "London Bridge", "Big Girls Don't Cry", and "Glamorous", as well as the No. 2 single "Fergalicious" and the No. 5 single "Clumsy". All five of the aforementioned singles have sold over 2 million digital downloads each in the United States, thus setting a new record in the digital era for the most multi-platinum singles from one album. The Dutchess sold over 6 million copies worldwide becoming one of the most successful albums of the era.

While predominantly focusing on R&B music during this time, Beyoncé also ventured into a pop sound with her third studio album I Am... Sasha Fierce in 2008, producing the top-ten singles "Single Ladies (Put a Ring on It)" at No. 1, "If I Were a Boy" at No. 3, "Halo" at No. 5, and "Sweet Dreams" at No. 10. The album and its accompanying songs won five Grammy Awards, helping Beyoncé set a record for the most Grammy Awards won by a female artist in one night.

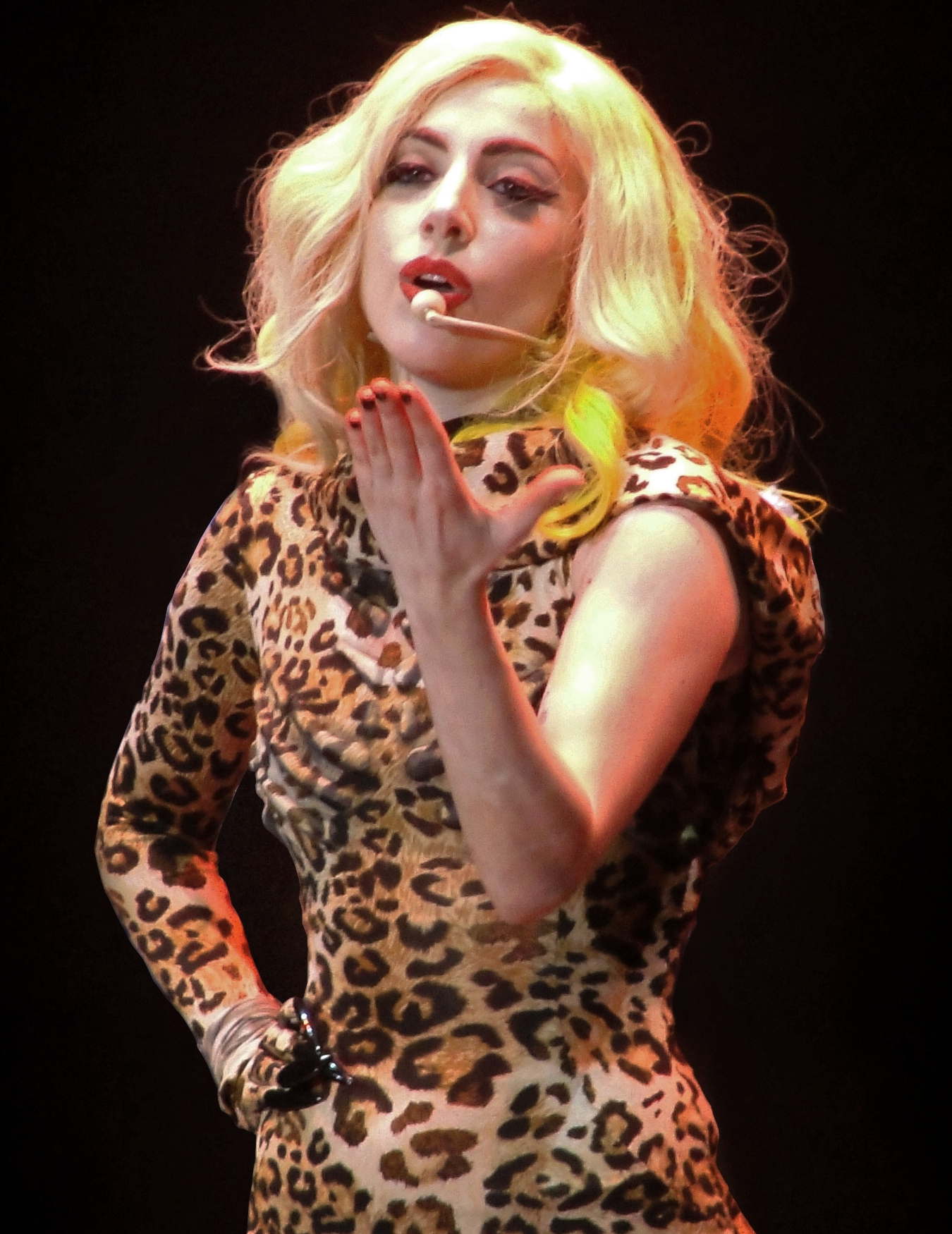
Lady Gaga's debut album, The Fame (2008), reached No. 1 in Canada, Austria, Germany, United Kingdom and Ireland and topped the Billboard Top Electronic Albums chart.

Lady Gaga took the latter part of the decade by storm and revived the electronic influence of pop music that had not been prominent since 2000. Her debut album, The Fame (2008), reached No. 1 in Canada, Austria, Germany, United Kingdom and Ireland and topped the Billboard Top Electronic Albums chart. Its first two singles, "Just Dance" and "Poker Face", became international No. 1 hits, topping the Hot 100 in the United States as well as other countries. The album later earned a total of six Grammy Award nominations and won awards for Best Electronic/Dance Album and Best Dance Recording. By the fourth quarter of 2009, she had released an extended play The Fame Monster, with the global chart-topping lead single "Bad Romance".

In 2001, Michael Jackson, one of popular music's most successful artists of all-times, released his final studio album Invincible, though it did not receive a lot of exposure compared to previous releases. In 2009, the album was voted by readers of Billboard as the Best Album of the Decade. Michael Jackson died in June 2009, creating the largest public mourning since the death of Diana, Princess of Wales in 1997.

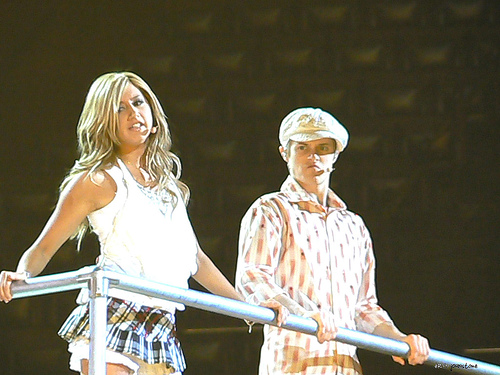
Ashley Tisdale and Lucas Grabeel are members of the High School Musical, Disney's most successful musical and soundtracks of the 2000s.

Children's music rose significantly in sales, especially with Disney (The Cheetah Girls, High School Musical, Hannah Montana: The Movie, and The Jonas Brothers among others). All The Cheetah Girls, High School Musical and Hannah Montana: The Movie albums were among the best-sellers of 2006 and 2007 and reached the No. 1 position, left many artists produced by Disney in the 2000s, The Cheetah Girls, Hilary Duff, Miley Cyrus, Demi Lovato, Jonas Brothers, Raven-Symoné, the best-selling artists of the decade.Katharine McPhee also had a brief success in the late 2000s with hit song "Over It". Some hit songs and soundtracks were airplayed mostly in the early 2000s and mid 2000s such as Bahamen's Who Let the Dogs Out?, soulDecision's faded in 2000, Son by Four's A Puro Dolor 2001, Kate Winslet's What If, Come What May in 2001, Beyond The Sea in 2003 and Way Back into Love in 2007.

The musical style of the 1980s influenced pop music to some extent in the later stages of the decade, especially around late 2009, as seen in Rihanna's hit "SOS" (a sampling of Soft Cell's "Tainted Love"), Lumidee's "She's Like the Wind" and Flo Rida's "Right Round", a reworking of the Dead or Alive hit "You Spin Me Round (Like a Record)". Other hits include Aaron Carter's cover of Bow Wow Wow's "I Want Candy", and Britney Spears' covers of "My Prerogative" and "I Love Rock 'n' Roll". Pop rock groups such as Metro Station, The Veronicas, and Owl City also displayed 1980s influences. Beyoncé's hit "Sweet Dreams" was not a direct sampling of a 1980s pop hit but Anne Hagerty of Billboard magazine was quoted as saying, "this track will fit right on a Michael Jackson or Madonna instrumental." Alien Ant Farm successfully covered Michael Jackson's "Smooth Criminal", and Fall Out Boy came out with their own cover of "Beat It", later on. Bowling for Soup also had a hit with "1985", a nostalgic ode to the 1980s.

1980s pop star Cyndi Lauper released several albums, experimenting with different styles, like adult contemporary, pop, pop rock, electronic music and blues. These were critically acclaimed and received several nominations for Grammy Award, and Lauper saw significant sales throughout the decade.

=== Adult contemporary ===
The radio format called adult contemporary music (primarily "soft rock" or "lite-rock"), began to somewhat decrease in popularity starting in the late 1990s (due to the increasing popularity of Top 40 music, ho) into January 2000 until September 11, 2001. After 9/11, popularity for Adult Contemporary Music (as well as Contemporary Christian Music crossovers) increased trifold during the grieving process, when the 25–44 Conservative Female Demographic favored listening to songs with appropriate, positive and uplifting lyrics containing love and hope. Upon the eventual return to normalcy after 9/11, the popularity of Adult Contemporary music held steady until about 2003, when Billboard began to change their chart formats. This led to adult contemporary stations to program their music "not-as-soft" or "cheesy" as they used to and ended up substituting the words "soft-rock" with "lite-rock", which has a more modern-edged connotation. Yet, AC stations remained careful to not cross the Adult Top 40 format line. Because of all these changes, AC Stations slowly increased in popularity.

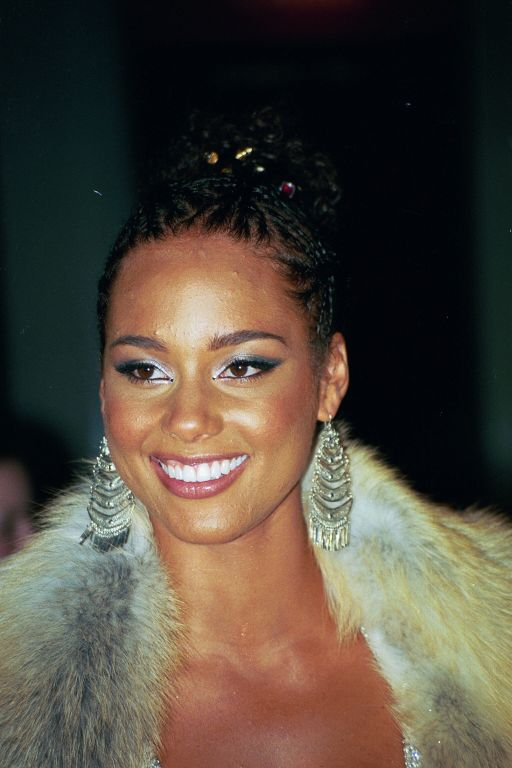
Alicia Keys was the best selling female R&B performer of the 2000s.

In the late 2000s, artists like Coldplay, Daughtry, The Fray, Gavin Rossdale, Sara Bareilles, Colbie Caillat, Diana Krall, Norah Jones, Kelly Clarkson, Alicia Keys, Jason Mraz, John Mayer and Leona Lewis were finding more success crossing over onto the Adult Contemporary charts. AC veterans such as Celine Dion, Rod Stewart, Phil Collins, The Eagles, Cyndi Lauper, Alanis Morissette and Sheryl Crow continued to release music only on the Adult Contemporary formats. There are three songs which experienced longevity atop the chart, "Love Song" by Sara Bareilles, "Bubbly" by Colbie Caillat, and "Breakaway" from Kelly Clarkson spent a longevity 20 weeks atop the chart.

Alicia Keys is considered the most successful R&B singer of the decade with 30 million records sold worldwide. Keys scored hits in the U.S. charts with seven songs on the Hot R&B/Hip-Hop Songs and four songs on the Billboard 100. She shares a record with Britney Spears, being the only two female singers to have their first four albums debuting in first place in the chart Billboard Hot 200. Beyoncé would become the third female singer to accomplish this feat in 2011.

Norah Jones is considered the greatest jazz singer of the decade with 37 million records sold worldwide. Her debut album Come Away With Me with sold 10 million copies in the U.S. and 20 million worldwide. Jones continued her success with her second album, Feels like Home. It became the biggest selling album in one week with 1.9 million copies sold. She released two more bestselling albums in the 2000s, had 3 albums debut in the Billboard 200, and won eight Grammys with her debut album and 12 Grammys in total during the decade.

=== Contemporary R&B ===
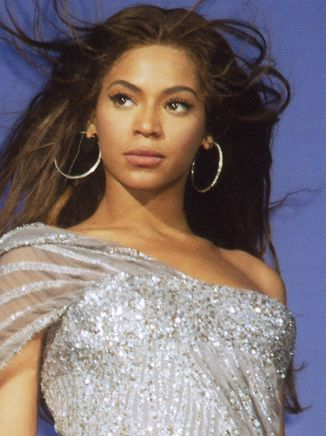
Beyoncé was one of the best selling female performers of the 2000s.

The continued popularity of contemporary R&B was seen during this decade in the global success of established artists such as Beyoncé, both as a solo artist, and with the help of Destiny's Child, Mariah Carey, Jennifer Lopez, Mary J. Blige, Craig David and Usher, whose careers began in the 1990s and continued in the dawn of the new millennium. The year 2001, in particular its summer, has been described as a golden age for contemporary R&B and urban soul music, with artists such as Janet Jackson, Jill Scott, Mariah Carey and Destiny's Child, who paved the way for Alicia Keys, Blu Cantrell, and the revival of Aaliyah.

Beyoncé was ranked the 4th Artist of the 2000s decade by Billboard, and was listed the most successful female artist of the 2000s, as well as the top radio artist of the 2000s. The Recording Industry Association of America (RIAA), also recognized Knowles as the top certified artist of the 2000s. Beyoncé, Michelle Williams and Kelly Rowland, better known as Destiny's Child is the most successful female R&B group of all time, selling over 50 million records worldwide during the 2000s. The group has many chart topping singles worldwide, such as "Survivor", "Say My Name", "Bootylicious", "Independent Women Part 1" and "Jumpin' Jumpin'".

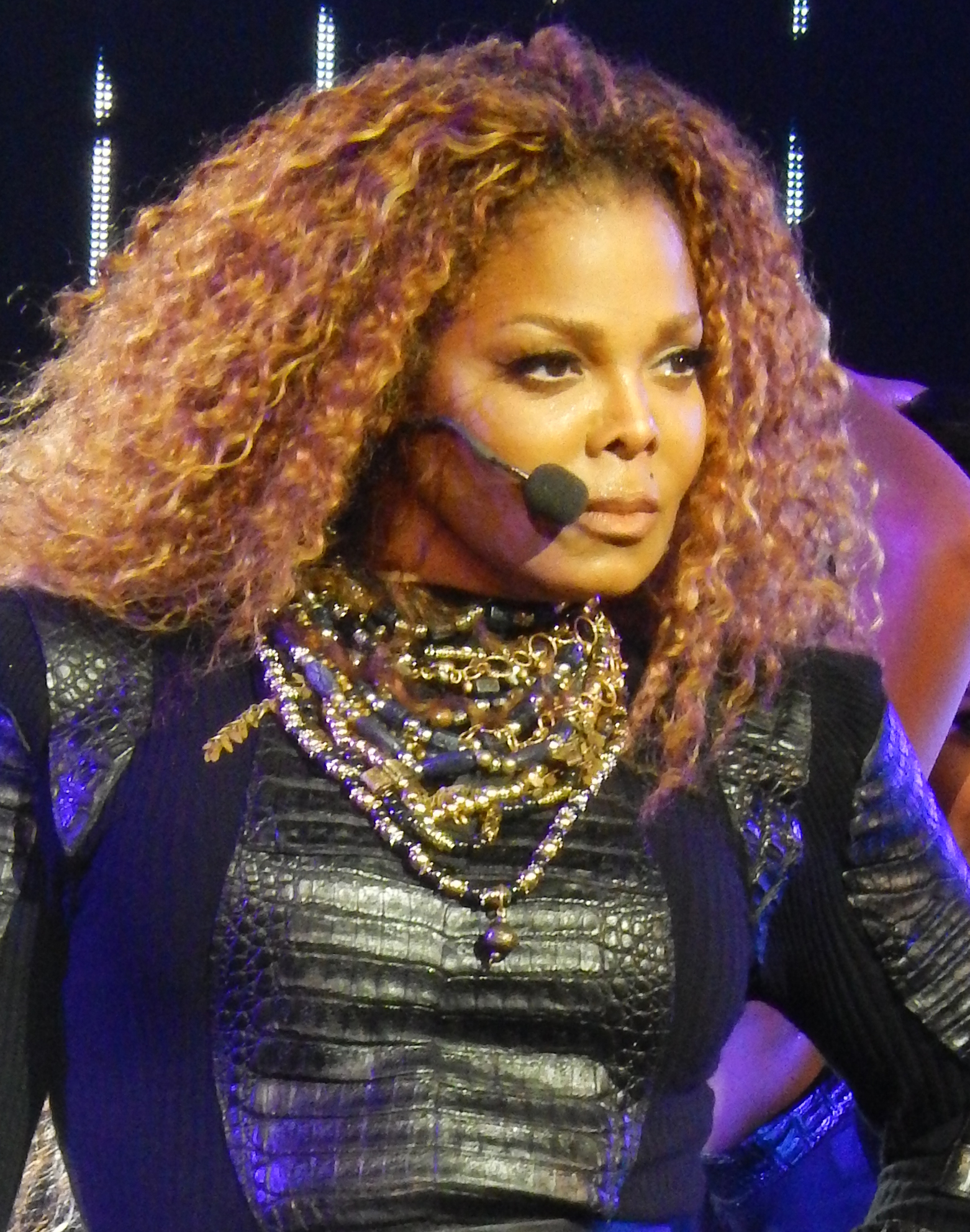
Janet Jackson was awarded the American Music Awards' Award of Merit in March 2001 for "her finely crafted, critically acclaimed and socially conscious, multi-platinum albums".

Janet Jackson was awarded the American Music Awards' Award of Merit in March 2001 for "her finely crafted, critically acclaimed and socially conscious, multi-platinum albums". She became the inaugural honoree of the "mtvICON" award, "an annual recognition of artists who have made significant contributions to music, music video and pop culture while tremendously impacting the MTV generation." Jackson's seventh album, All for You, was released in April 2001, debuting at No. 1 on the Billboard 200. Selling 605,000 copies, All for You had the highest first-week sales total of her career. Stephen Thomas Erlewine of AllMusic stated "[Jackson's] created a record that's luxurious and sensual, spreading leisurely over its 70 minutes, luring you in even when you know better", and Jon Pareles of The New York Times commented, "[a]s other rhythm and blues strips down to match the angularity of hip-hop, Ms. Jackson luxuriates in textures as dizzying as a new infatuation." The album's title-track, "All for You", debuted on the Hot 100 at No. 14, the highest debut ever for a single that was not commercially available. Teri VanHorn of MTV dubbed Jackson "Queen of Radio" as the single made radio airplay history, "[being] added to every pop, rhythmic and urban radio station that reports to the national trade magazine Radio & Records" in its first week. The single peaked at number one, where it topped the Hot 100 for seven weeks. It received the 2001 Grammy Award for Best Dance Recording. The second single, "Someone to Call My Lover", which contained a heavy guitar loop of America's "Ventura Highway", peaked at No. 3 on the Hot 100. All for You was certified double platinum by the RIAA and sold more than 9 million copies worldwide.

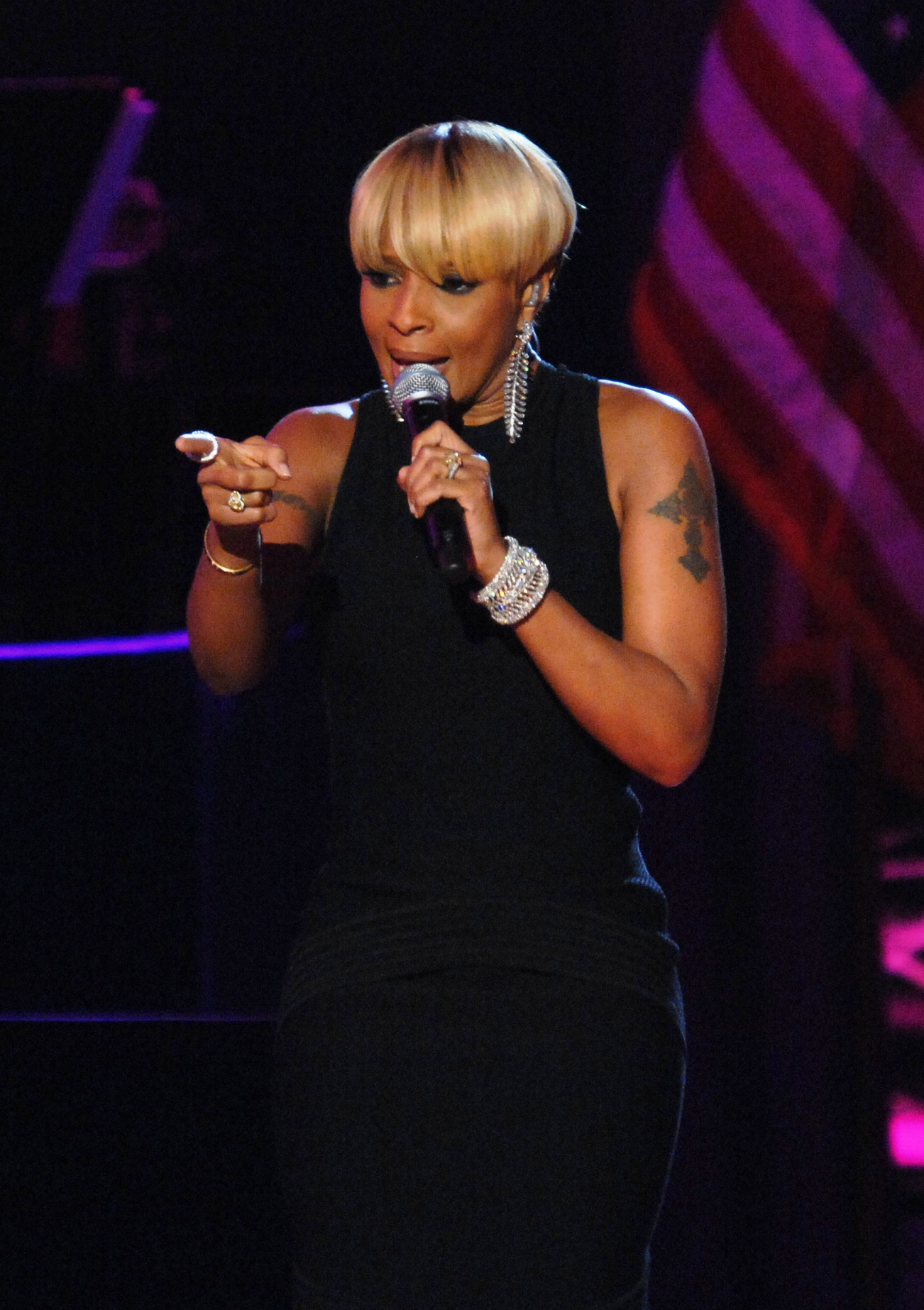
Singer Mary J. Blige topped the Billboard Hot 100 in 2001 with her smash single, "Family Affair", taken from hit album No More Drama.

Usher was named the number-one Hot 100 artist of the 2000s decade and the 2nd most successful artist of the 2000s decade. He released the album Confessions which went on to become the best-selling album of 2004 and the second best-selling album of the 2000s. He also had the overall total most No. 1 singles of the decade with seven going top. Confessions is now certified Diamond by the RIAA. Other emerging acts from the early 2000s include Ashanti, Rihanna, Trey Songz, Cupid, DJ Casper, Ne-Yo, Sisqó, Chris Brown, Bobby V, Keyshia Cole, Pretty Ricky, B2K, Jaheim, Musiq Soulchild, Fantasia, and Ciara.

Singer Mary J. Blige topped the Billboard Hot 100 in 2001 with her smash single, "Family Affair", taken from hit album No More Drama. She scored a big hit with, "Be Without You", which peaked at No. 3 on the Hot 100. During the 2000s decade, Mary released five platinum albums. Billboard magazine ranked Blige as the most successful female R&B artist of the past 25 years. The magazine also lists "Be Without You" as the top R&B song of the 2000s, as it spent an unparalleled 15 weeks atop the Hot R&B/Hip-Hop Songs chart.

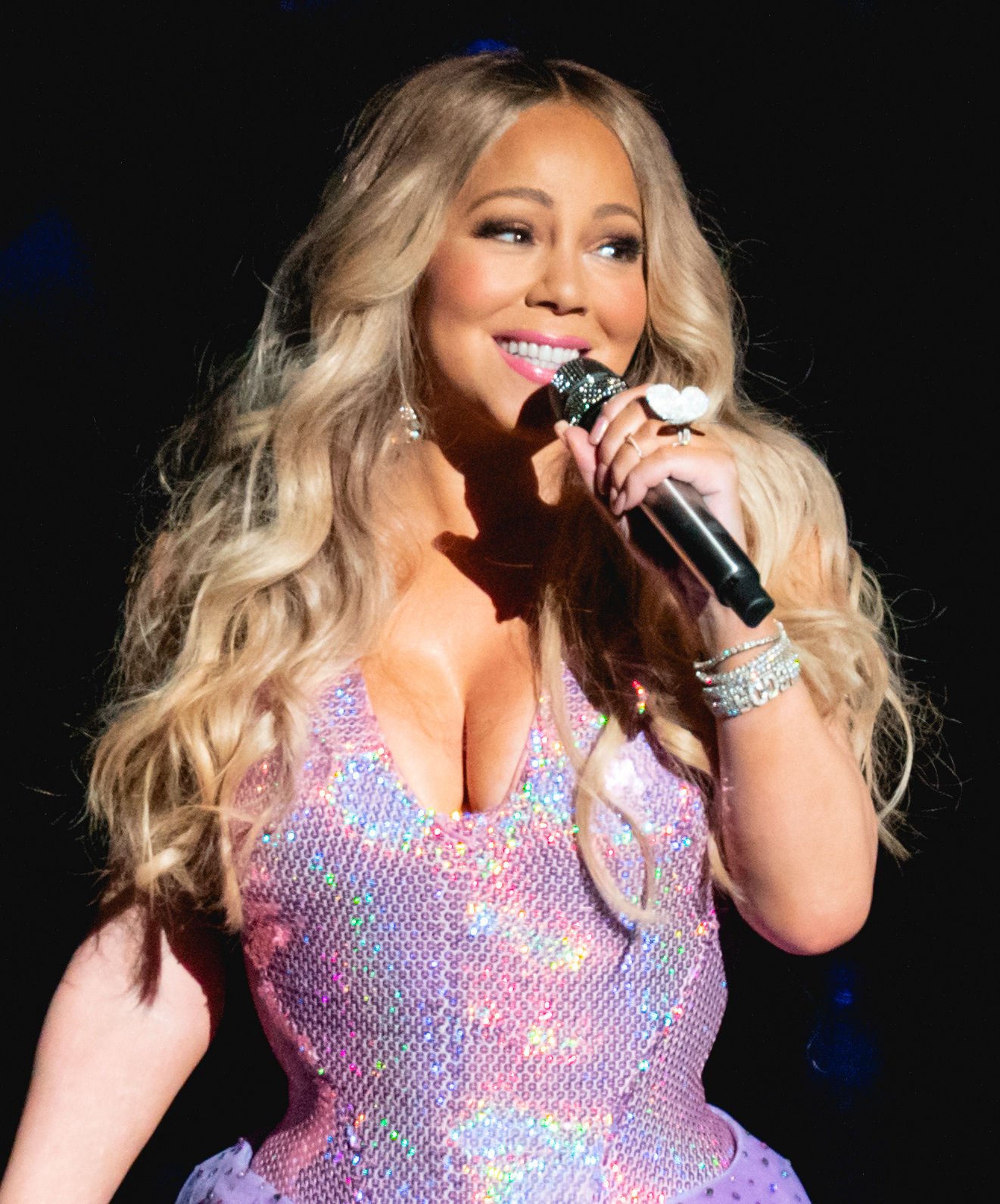
Mariah Carey's 2008 album E=MC² spawned her 18th chart-topper, "Touch My Body", with which she surpassed Elvis Presley to become the solo artist with the most Hot 100 No. 1 songs in history.

After experiencing a dominant run of success throughout the 1990s, Mariah Carey experienced a commercial lull with Glitter and Charmbracelet, the first two albums she released in the 2000s. However, she made an astounding comeback in 2005 with the release of The Emancipation of Mimi, which debuted at No. 1 on the Billboard 200 albums chart. The album included the No. 1 singles "We Belong Together", which shattered airplay records and was named the Song of the Decade by Billboard, and "Don't Forget About Us", as well as "Shake It Off", which peaked at No. 2 (it was blocked from the No. 1 spot by "We Belong Together", making Carey the first female artist in Billboard history to occupy the top two spots on the Hot 100 as a lead artist). Additionally, Carey's 2008 album E=MC² spawned her 18th chart-topper, "Touch My Body", with which she surpassed Elvis Presley to become the solo artist with the most Hot 100 No. 1 songs in history.

R&B artist Robin Thicke topped the R&B Charts with his hit single "Lost Without U". He was the first white artist to top these charts since George Michael. His album The Evolution of Robin Thicke went on to be certified platinum by the RIAA. Some other R&B singers dominated mid to late 2000s such as Samantha Cole, Shontelle, Amerie, Akon, Mario, Colby O'Donis, Soulja Boy, Glenn Lewis, Jennifer Hudson, Jordin Sparks.

=== Country ===
Country music sales continued to rise, as the Billboard 200 all-genre album chart frequently had albums recorded by country music artists listed; several of those titles were certified double platinum or better, indicating the genre continued to have a strong niche in the music industry.

In 2002, The Statler Brothers retired from music. Jimmy Fortune struck out on his own as a solo artist with the help of The Oak Ridge Boys and continues to record music and tour today.

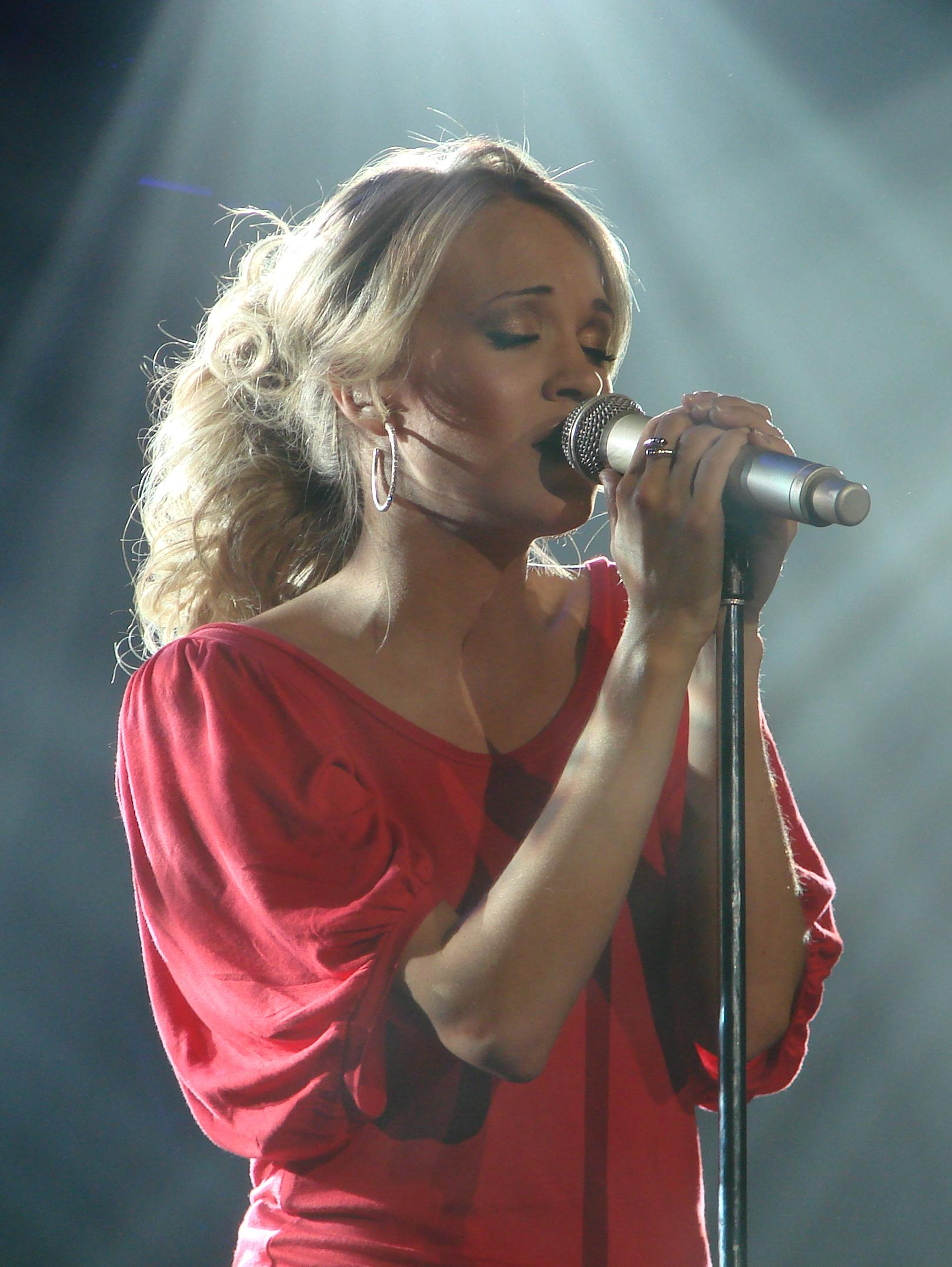
American Idol winner Carrie Underwood registered successful songs on country music charts.

One of the most successful new artists of the decade was Carrie Underwood. In 2005, the Checotah, Oklahoma, native became the first American Idol winner to record primarily country music, instead of pop, rap or rhythm and blues. By the end of the decade, Underwood had amassed eight No. 1 songs on the Billboard Hot Country Songs chart, along with numerous awards from the Country Music Association, Academy of Country Music and others.

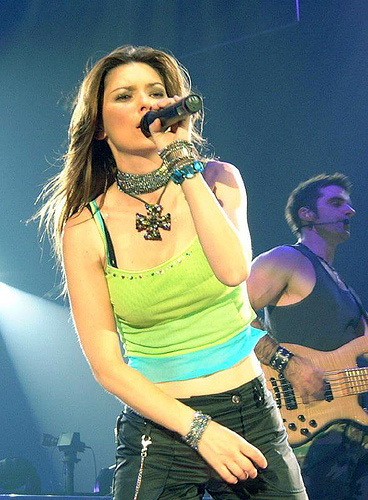
On September 23, 2004, the RIAA certified Up! at 11× Platinum, giving Shania Twain the distinction of being the only female artist to have three consecutive diamond albums released in the United States.

Country pop, a subgenre which has its roots in the Nashville Sound of the late 1950s – early 1960s, continued to flourish in popularity. The most prominent act was Shania Twain, with her album Up!, released in 2002. Top performers in the genre included Dixie Chicks, Lonestar, Martina McBride, Tim McGraw, Faith Hill, Keith Urban, Jessica Andrews, Billy Gilman and Rascal Flatts. In the middle of the decade, an informal group of singers and songwriters called the MuzikMafia formed to promote their mesh of honky-tonk and outlaw brand of country music; the most prominent members were "Big" Kenny Alphin and John Rich (of the duo Big & Rich) and Gretchen Wilson, who enjoyed success in the middle part of the decade.

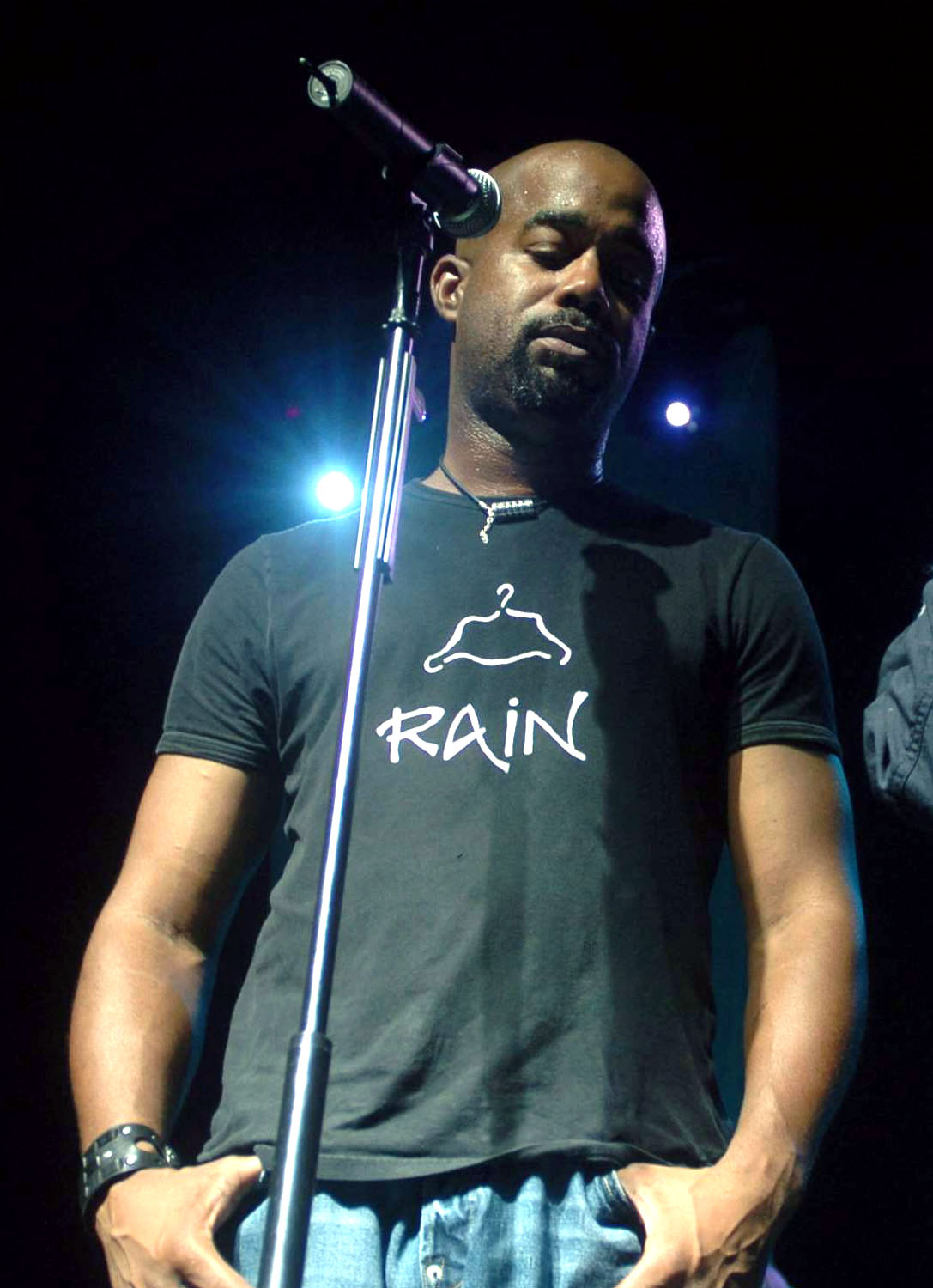
Darius Rucker had three No. 1 country hits in 2008–09: "Don't Think I Don't Think About It", "It Won't Be Like This for Long" and "Alright".

Many non-country artists enjoyed success in the country music during the 2000s. The most successful of these artists has been former Hootie & the Blowfish lead singer Darius Rucker, who had three No. 1 hits in 2008–09: "Don't Think I Don't Think About It", "It Won't Be Like This for Long" and "Alright". The Eagles, a California-based country-rock group, had their first major success on the Hot Country Songs chart in more than 30 years in 2007–08 with the songs "How Long" and "Busy Being Fabulous". Pop-rock singers Michelle Branch and Jessica Harp formed The Wreckers and had two top 10 hits, including the No. 1 hit "Leave the Pieces". Other non-country artists who had success in the genre were Kid Rock, Sheryl Crow, Robert Plant, Jewel, Jessica Simpson, Bon Jovi and Miley Cyrus.

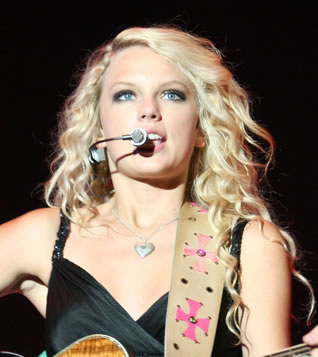
Taylor Swift rose to fame in the late 2000s, with her unique country-pop style, spawning global hits like "Love Story" and "You Belong with Me".

In the late 2000s, teenager Taylor Swift became the first country act to enjoy widespread mainstream popularity since the 1980s. Her self-titled debut studio album produced several top-ten hits on Billboard Hot Country Songs chart, while her second album Fearless spawned two of Swift's biggest international hits – "Love Story" and "You Belong with Me" – both reached the top 5 of the Billboard Hot 100 (and atop several of the Hot 100 component charts) after topping the Hot Country Songs chart. At the 2009 MTV Video Music Awards, Swift became the first country artist in history to win a VMA award, with "You Belong with Me". The self-titled album became the longest charting album of the 2000s decade on the Billboard 200 chart, across all music genres. Fearless topped the same chart for 11 weeks, a feat that has not been matched by another country album since then. In 2016, Billboard wrote that "the country landscape is much different today, thanks in part to Swift and her insistence on following a game plan that many considered unorthodox", noting the favorable views toward country music since her debut, and reported that following her rise to fame, labels have become more interested in signing young country singers and artists who write their own music.

Not everyone celebrated the success of artists such as Underwood and Swift, reflecting the continued discontent and debate over what constituted "real" country music, a debate that had been on and off since the 1970s. Despite the fact that country music songs had long been crossing over to pop radio (and charting since the start of the Billboard charts in 1940), some critics continued to state opinions that the pop-oriented sound was little more than repackaged pop music. In 2009, legendary country music artist George Jones proclaimed that "they've (the new artists) stolen our identity. ... They had to use something that was established already, and that's traditional country music. So what they need to do really, I think, is find their own title, because they're definitely not traditional country music." In addition, several forums, including the classic country-oriented Pure Country Music Web site, regularly included posts that were openly critical of artists such as Swift and Rascal Flatts. Songs such as "Murder on Music Row" (by George Strait and Alan Jackson) and "Too Country" (by Brad Paisley) gained widespread acceptance and radio airplay, despite criticism in the lyrics over the eschewing of traditional sounds by radio programmers. The American duo Sugarland rose to fame with four albums topping U.S. country charts.

However, traditional country music retained a large following during the decade, thanks to the ongoing successes of veteran artists such as Strait, Jackson, Reba McEntire, Brooks & Dunn, Toby Keith and Kenny Chesney, and newer artists such as Paisley, Blake Shelton and Billy Currington. McEntire's success came with two albums hitting No. 1 on the all-genre Billboard 200 albums chart (Reba: Duets and Keep On Loving You), and at the end of the decade had her biggest hit of her career ("Consider Me Gone"). Rogers, Parton and Willie Nelson, all artists who had No. 1 country hits as far back as the early 1970s, all had No. 1 songs during the 2000s decade. In addition, veteran songwriters such as Bill Anderson and Bobby Braddock also enjoyed continued success with newly written songs. Late in the decade, newcomers such as Jamey Johnson and Miranda Lambert were widely hailed for their songwriting and performance talents.

The legendary group Alabama retired from touring in 2004 after nearly a quarter century of mainstream success, primarily during the 1980s and 1990s. Its band members – cousins Randy Owen, Teddy Gentry and Jeff Cook; and drummer Mark Herndon – remained active performers and recorded a successful series of albums containing gospel and traditional old-time songs.

Many legendary country music figures died during the decade. Some of the more prominent names included Pee Wee King, Chet Atkins, Waylon Jennings, June Carter Cash, Johnny Cash, Skeeter Davis, Buck Owens, Hank Thompson, Porter Wagoner, Eddy Arnold, Jerry Reed, Vern Gosdin and Hank Locklin.

=== Electronic music ===
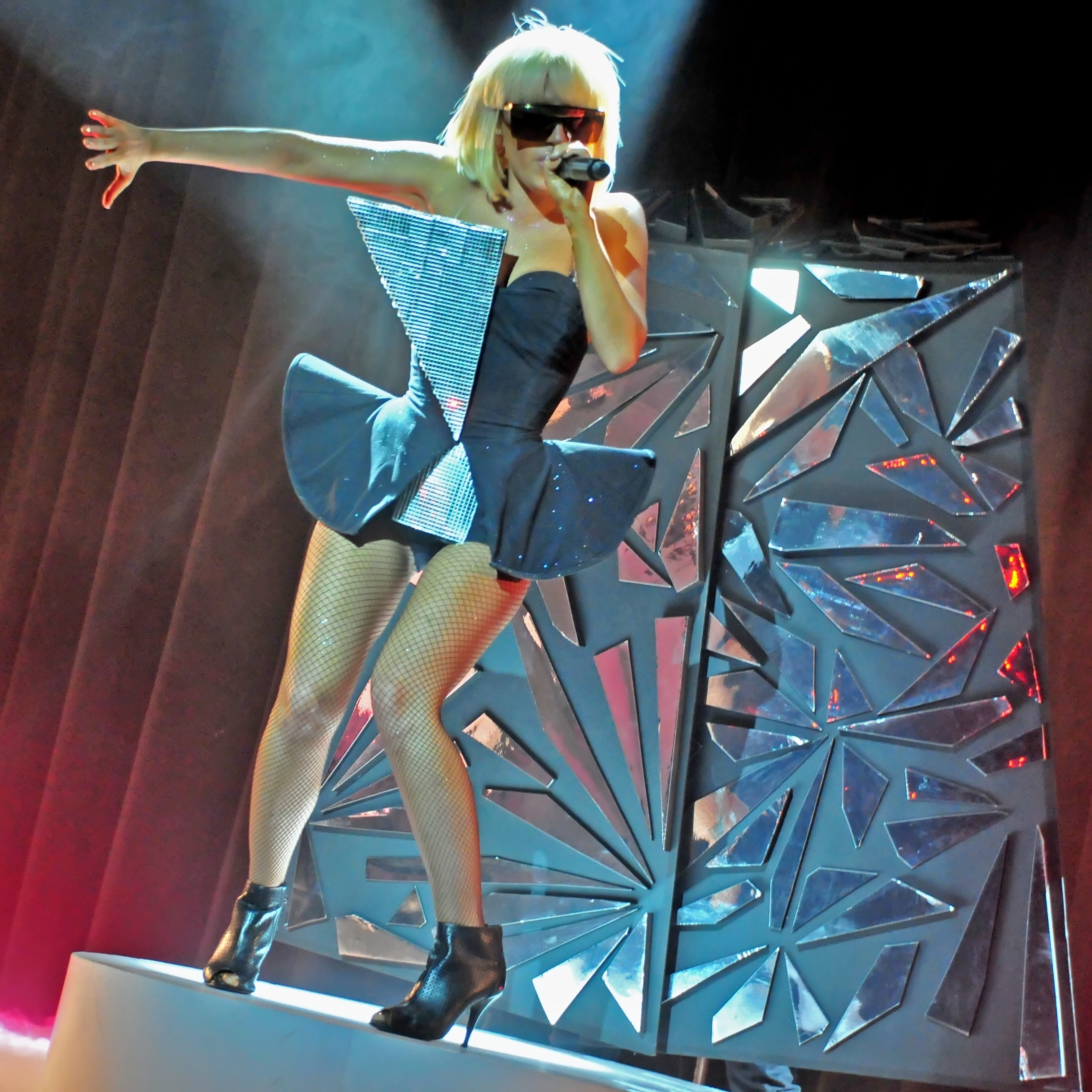
Lady Gaga's single, "Poker Face", reached number one in the United States, Australia, Canada, and the UK.

In Europe, trance music and house music started to gain popularity in the 2000s, prominently progressive trance and progressive house where popular throughout the 2000s. Hard house became the next big craze after trance in 2001, with a certain amount of cross-over between the two genres (in some cases creating hard trance tracks), but this style diminished in as the decade later wore on. As a kind of backlash, ambient, chillout music achieved mainstream popularity in the early 2000s, with a successful market of chillout compilations and the genre even making it into television commercials and soundtracks. Popular electronic artists of the decade included Deadmau5, LCD Soundsystem, Owl City and Kaskade.

Disco house and funky house, popular in the late 1990s, continued to be successful through to the mid-2000s before the sound of electro house developed in late 2006. The electro sound began to merge with other genres such as hip-hop as the decade drew to a close.

From 2007, dance music started gaining popularity in North America with dance-pop hits by artists such as the pop singer Rihanna's song "Don't Stop the Music" and "Disturbia". Hilary Duff in her album Dignity has changed her style from pop rock to the more contemporary electropop, to go with the current trends.

In 2008 and 2009, electropop and nu-disco increased in popularity in North America, replacing hip-hop and R&B as the dominant genres of music. Artists like Britney Spears, Beyoncé, and Lady Gaga brought this style to great popularity towards the end of 2008 with their hits such as Britney's "Womanizer", Beyoncé's "Single Ladies (Put a Ring on It)" and Gaga's "Poker Face". Furthermore, Madonna's singles such as "Hung Up" (No. 1 in 45 countries) and "4 Minutes" (No. 1 in 32 countries) become huge dance hits.

Pop duo Aly & AJ explored electropop and 1980s new wave influences in their second album Insomniatic. In addition, some of the most successful electronica American artists and DJs in the 1990s, such as Moby and The Crystal Method, also continued their success during the 2000s.

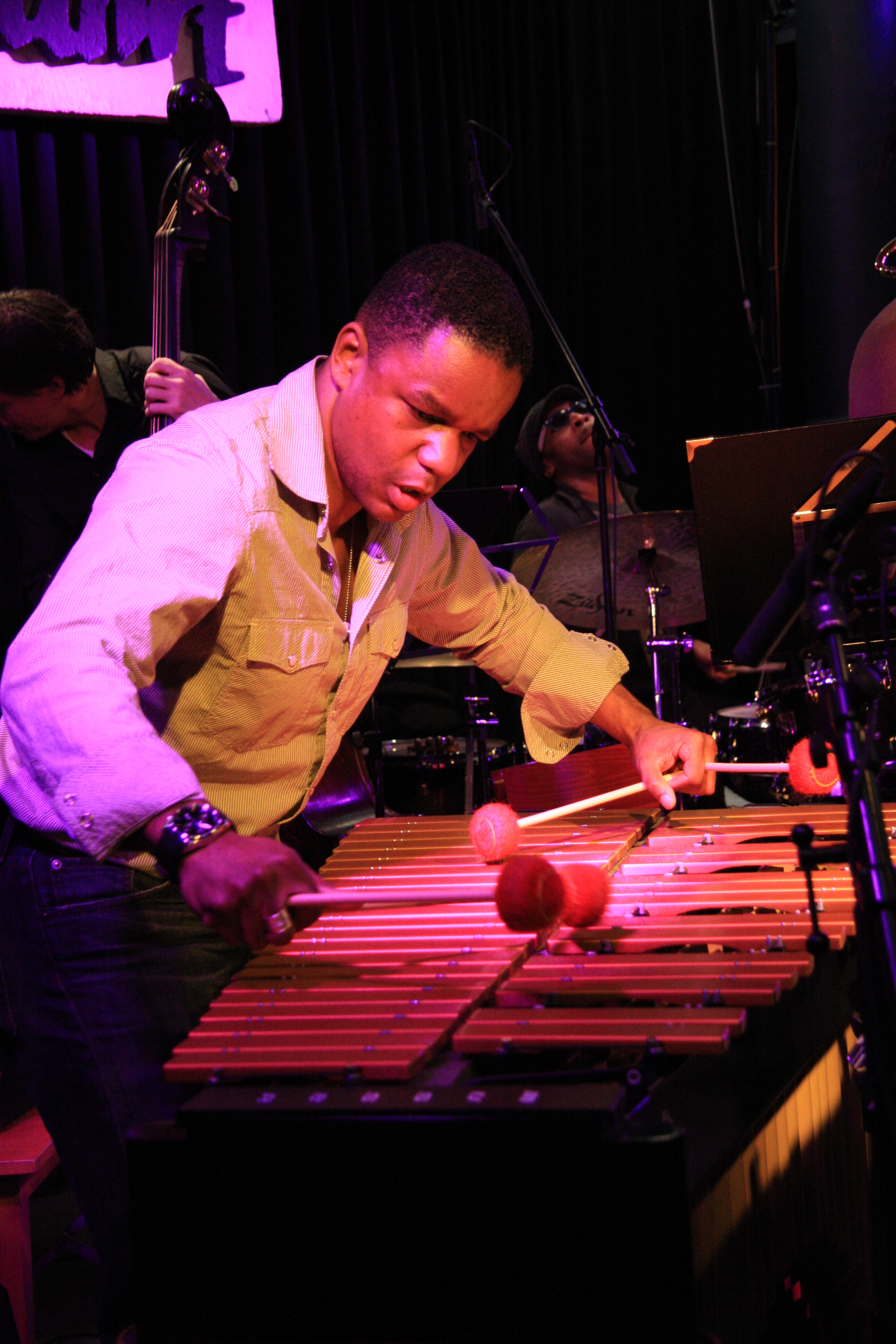
In 2003, Stephon Harris's album The Grand Unification Theory won the Martin E. Segal Award from Jazz at Lincoln Center.

=== Jazz ===
In the 2000s, straight-ahead jazz continued to appeal to a core group of listeners. Well-established jazz musicians, such as Dave Brubeck, Wynton Marsalis, Sonny Rollins, Wayne Shorter or Kenny Barron continue to perform and record. In the 2000s, a number of young musicians emerged, including the pianist Jason Moran, vibraphonist Stefon Harris, trumpeter Roy Hargrove, and bassist Christian McBride.

In addition, a number of new vocalists have achieved popularity with a mix of traditional jazz and pop/rock forms, such as Diana Krall, Norah Jones, Cassandra Wilson, Kurt Elling, and Jamie Cullum. Norah Jones and Diana Krall, due to their massive international success during the 2000s are considered the first and second most successful female jazz singers of the decade, respectively. Diana Krall has topped the Music Billboards multiple times in the year 2000. The week of April 15, 2000, Krall's album When I Look in Your Eyes reached number one, followed by Al Jarreau's Tomorrow Today and Kenny G's Classics in the Key of G. Norah Jones was named the top jazz artist of the 2000–2009 decade by Billboard. Jones had many albums come out in the 2000s decade, including jazz and adult contemporary. These include Come Away with Me in 2002, New York City in 2003, and Feels Like Home in 2004.

=== Reggae ===
==== Dancehall ====
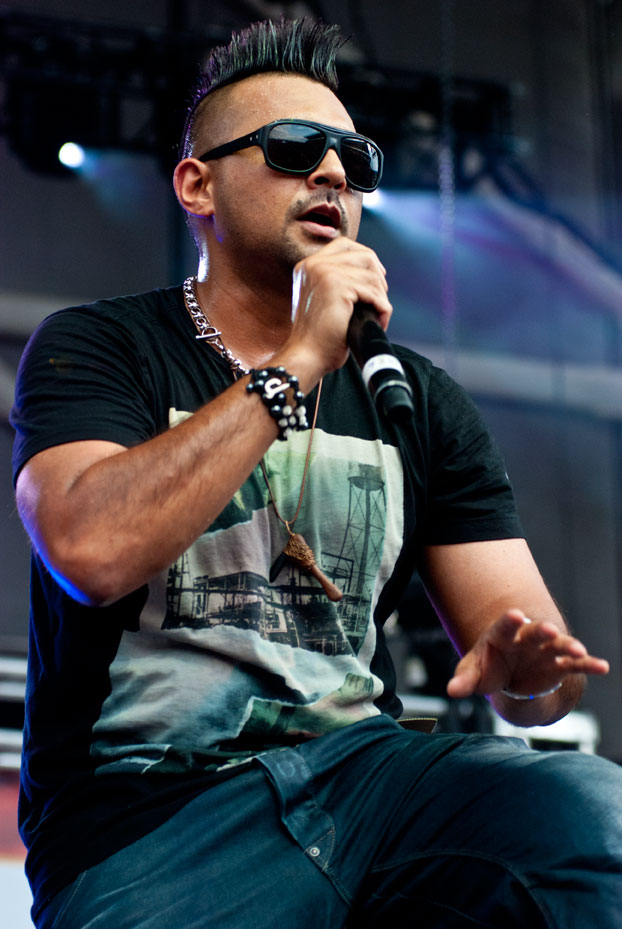
Sean Paul's third album The Trinity debuted at number 5 on the Billboard 200, breaking records with its first-week sales for a reggae/dancehall artist, and eventually going Platinum in the United States.

The early 2000s saw the success of older and newer charting acts such as Baha Men, Sean Kingston, Elephant Man, Akon, and Sean Paul, who has achieved mainstream success in the U.S. and has produced several top 10 Billboard hits, including "Gimme the Light", "We Be Burnin'", "(When You Gonna) Give It Up to Me", and "Break It Off" (a duet with Rihanna). He has also had several No. 1 singles, "Get Busy", "Temperature" and "Baby Boy" (a duet with Beyoncé).

==== Reggaetón ====
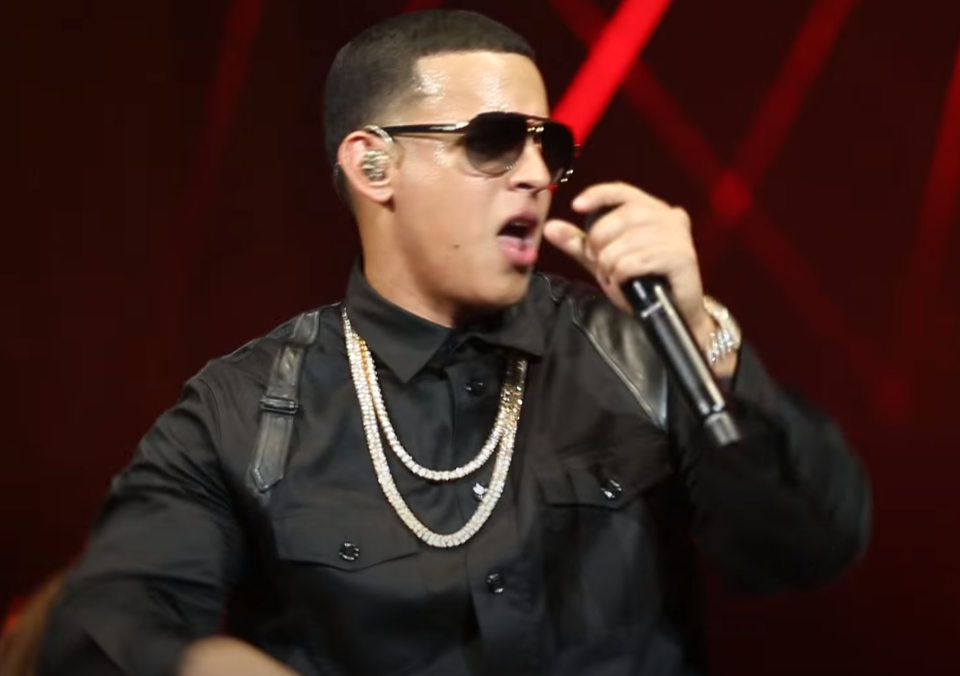
In 2005, The New York Times wrote, "Reggaetón has conquered parties, clubs and lately radio; Daddy Yankee's hit "Gasolina" reached MTV and the playlists of many hip-hop stations."

Reggaetón gained mainstream exposure and massive popularity in North America during the mid-2000s. Reggaetón blends West-Indian music influences of reggae and dancehall with those of Latin America, such as bomba, plena, salsa, merengue, latin pop, cumbia and bachata as well as that of hip-hop, contemporary R&B, and electronica. The influence of this genre has spread to the wider Latino communities in the United States, as well as the Latin American audience. Shakira has sold more than 100 million copies in the 21st century.

=== Christian music ===
Christian music continued to gain popularity after its success in the 1990s with acts such as Jars of Clay and Audio Adrenaline. Relient K's work in the pop punk/pop rock scene earned them three albums certified gold – The Anatomy of the Tongue in Cheek, Two Lefts Don't Make a Right...but Three Do, and Mmhmm – and a Grammy nomination. Skillet recorded two Grammy-nominated albums – Collide and Comatose – and achieved Platinum-selling status with Awake, and Gold with Comatose.

== Europe ==
=== Rock ===
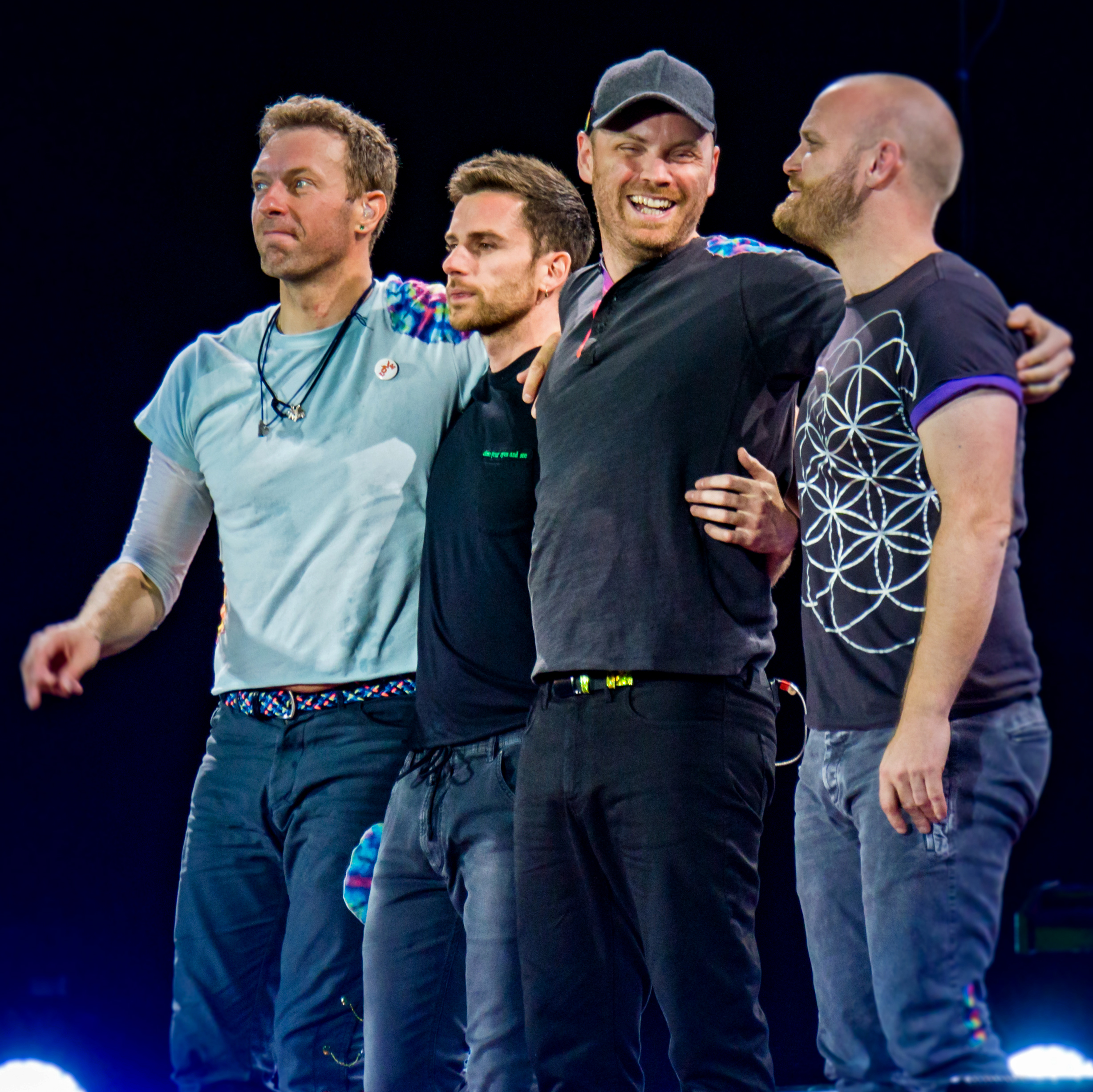
Coldplay is considered to be the most successful British rock act of the decade.

Post-Britpop act Coldplay saw major success in European album charts during the decade. Coldplay had with No. 1 albums and a U.S. No. 1 single with "Viva la Vida", the first English band to do so since The Beatles. British Indie rock and indie pop returned to popularity in the mid–late 2000s with artists such as Arctic Monkeys, Franz Ferdinand, Belle and Sebastian, Amy Winehouse, Kaiser Chiefs, Keane, The Libertines, Editors, Lily Allen, Kate Nash, Florence And The Machine, Peter Bjorn and John and The Ting Tings achieving substantial chart success. Post–punk bands such as Bloc Party, Foals and Editors also saw some popularity. Britpop act Oasis also remained popular in the 2000s, spawning four No.1 albums in the UK until the disbandment of the group in autumn 2009.

U2 continued their popularity into the 2000s, releasing three critically acclaimed albums, and were credited with influencing many prominent acts of the decade such as Coldplay and Muse.

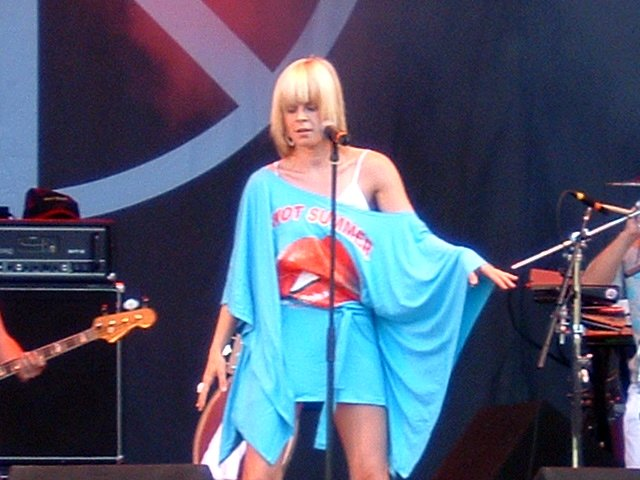
Robyn on tour in 2003.

In the early and mid-2000s, British Indie rock groups such as The Libertines, Arctic Monkeys, Bloc Party and Kaiser Chiefs witnessed commercial and chart success not seen by guitar music since Britpop in the 1990s. Regional indie rock scenes such as New Yorkshire also appeared at this point in the decade. Indie music itself increased in popularity due to the increased commercialization of alternative, and major labels begin marketing indie bands with mainstream appeal. American indie/rock band The Killers also became very popular in Britain with their singles "Mr. Brightside", "When You Were Young", and "Smile Like You Mean It".

Radiohead enjoyed further success in the 2000s, moving away from their experimental sound of the Kid A/Amnesiac era to a more "typical" Alternative rock sound. Muse saw a similar level of commercial acclaim, with the rock trio releasing three chart-topping albums.

The late 2000s (entering into the early 2010s) saw the revival and influence of synthpop music, also known as 'new urban' pop. Notable acts include Hot Chip, Junior Boys, Little Boots and La Roux. The late 2000s also saw acts such as Irish rock band The Script have international success.

The era also saw solo success for singer-songwriters, including David Gray, Dido, James Blunt, James Morrison, KT Tunstall and Amy Macdonald.

=== Alternative rock and Metal ===
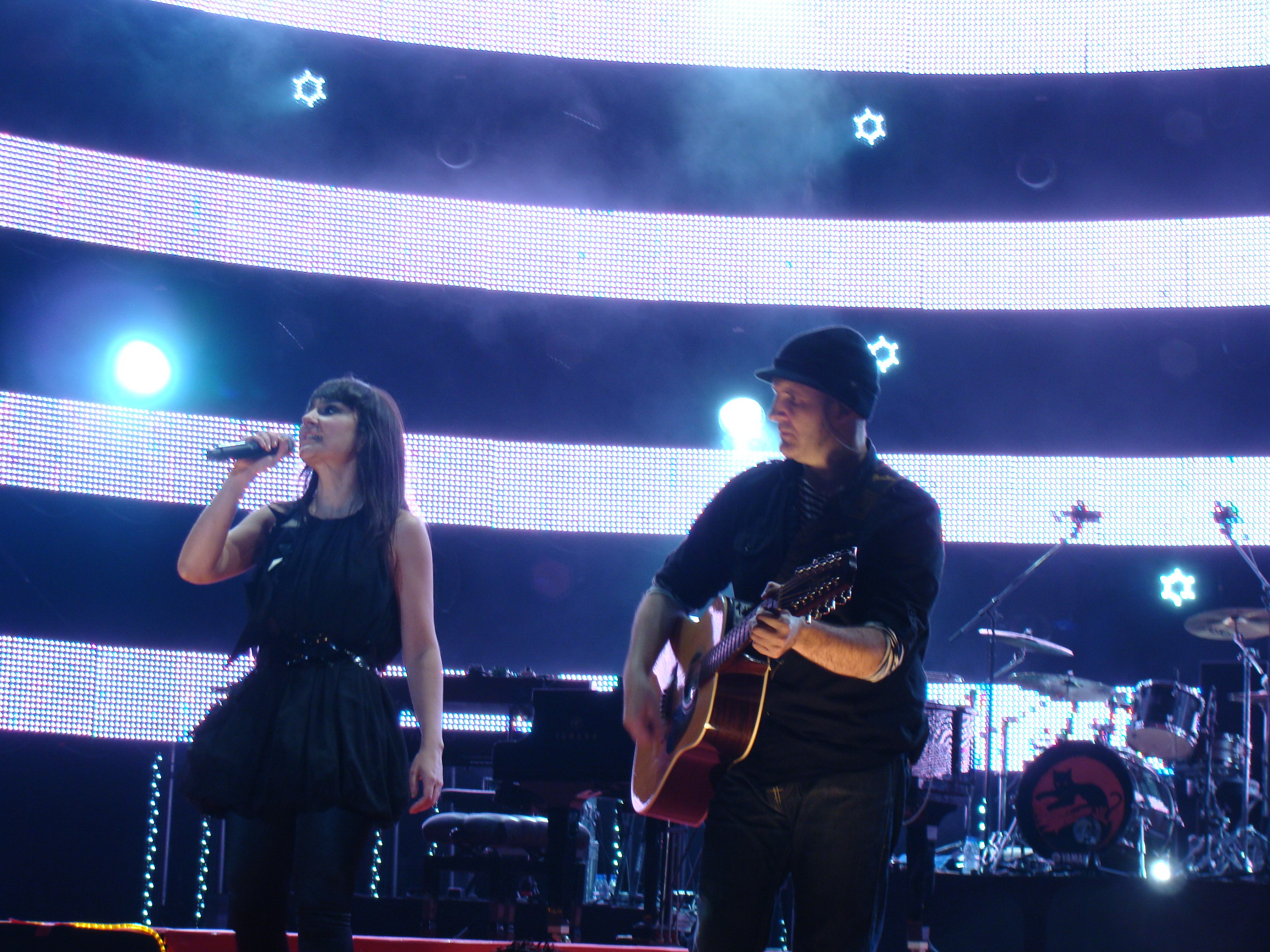
Amaral - the best- selling Spanish alternantive rock duo of the decade.

Nightwish is the third-best-selling band and musical entity in Finland with HIM at the first place. The group is also the most successful Finnish band worldwide, selling more than 10 million records Their 2004 album, Once, has sold more than one million copies In 2005, HIM also became famous worldwide with their album, Dark Light. In Netherlands, Within Temptation emerged to a symphonic metal scene from the late 90s to mid 2000s.Finnish alternative rock band The Rasmus rose to fame for their 2003 hit single "In the Shadows".

=== Pop ===
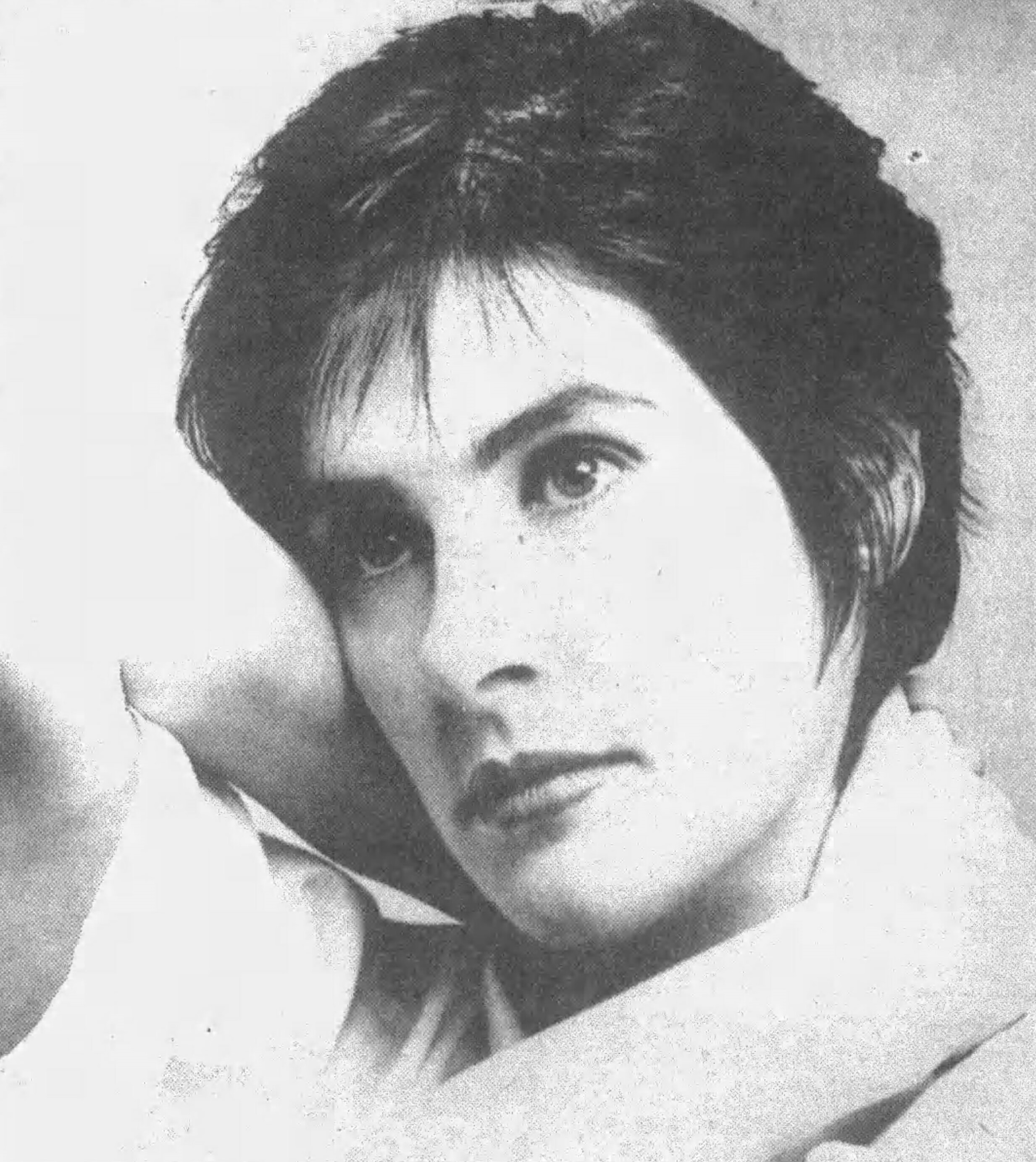
Enya's 2000 album A Day Without Rain sold 15 million copies.

Girl groups Sugababes, Girls Aloud, Atomic Kitten, Play, Liberty X, Girl Thing and t.A.T.u. spanned successful careers throughout most of the decade, while 1990s act Spice Girls announced their breakup in 2001 and later reformed in 2007. 1990s act S Club 7 broke up in 2003, after five years of considerable chart success. Hear'say and C21 also had a short-lived success. Blue also knew success in the 2000s. The 2000s also saw the mainstream popularity of Trademark, Ronan Keating, Stephen Gately, Bosson, Craig David, Gareth Gates, Daniel Bedingfield, Natasha Bedingfield, James Blunt, Sarah Connor, Dolores O'Riordan, Sophie Ellis Bextor, Bond, Celtic Woman, Samantha Mumba, Estelle, BBMak, Hermes House Band, Il Divo, Regina Spektor, Katie Melua, Brian McFadden, Will Young, Lily Allen and Shayne Ward.

Irish singer Enya continued to enjoy steady success during the 2000s; her 2000 album A Day Without Rain sold 15 million copies and she was named the world's best selling female artist of 2001.

The Spanish girl group Las Ketchup rose to fame with the 2002 hit single, "The Ketchup Song (Aserejé)", a single that sold over seven million copies worldwide. Some mainstream Spanish acts of the decade included Alejandro Sanz, Bebe, La Oreja de Van Gogh, La Quinta Estación, Alex Ubago, Rosario Flores, Amaral and female rapper Mala Rodríguez. Danish pop duo Nik & Jay rose to fame with their #2 single "Hot!" which won them Hit of the Year and Best New Artist at the Danish Music Awards in 2003.

Audience-voted reality talent shows became very popular with UK TV audiences in the 2000s. Such programs included Popstars, Pop Idol, Fame Academy and The X Factor, Britain's Got Talent and many contestants progressed onto mainstream chart success such as Susan Boyle. The Eurovision Song Contest also retained its important status within European music.

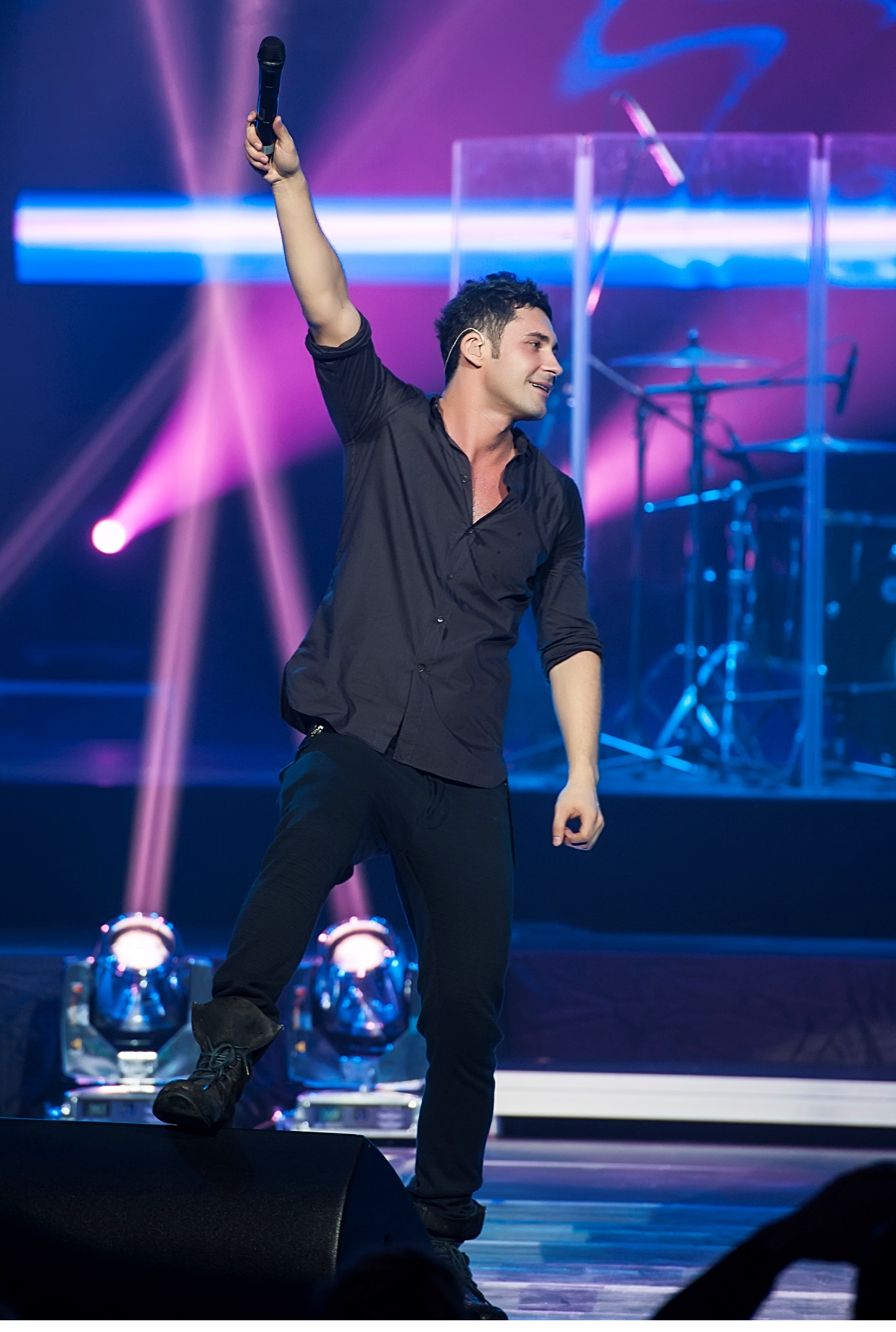
O-Zone's "Dragostea Din Tei" topped charts in France, Germany, and Austria for over three months, reached number 3 in the United Kingdom and number 72 on the US Pop 100.

1980s female pop stars Madonna and Kylie Minogue enjoyed a large presence on the European music scene, both having numerous hits in the 2000s including "Music", "Hollywood", "Hung Up", and "Celebration" for Madonna, and "Spinning Around", "Can't Get You Out of My Head", "Slow", and "In My Arms" for Kylie. Britney Spears retained a huge impact throughout the continent and was one of the most successful artists of the decade in that region. In 2004, Moldovan pop music trio O-Zone's hit single "Dragostea Din Tei" witnessed major European and international success. Later in the decade, Romanian pop/dance singer Inna spawned a European hit single with "Hot" and became the first Romanian internationally known female star in modern history. When American boy band Backstreet Boys returned to the music scene in 2005 with a more adult rock sound, some of their 1990s contemporaries from Europe followed. Take That reunited in 2006 without Robbie Williams and managed to recreate their earlier success. Bands such as Boyzone also experienced second-time success, whilst others of the same era such as 5ive and East 17 did not and subsequently disbanded. The Irish boy band Westlife were very successful and emerged as the top selling Irish group of the decade with 44 million records sold and a number of record-breaking hit singles and albums.

=== Soul ===
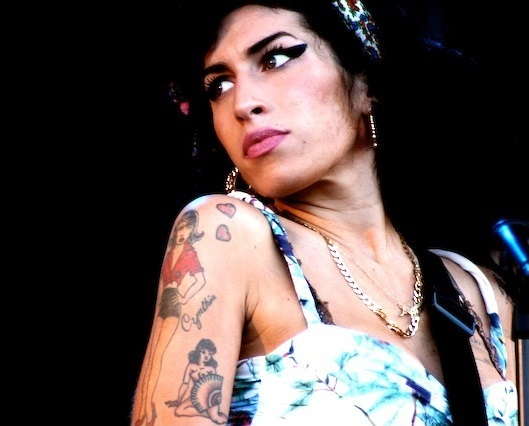
In 2008, Amy Winehouse tied the then record for the most wins by a female artist in a single night and became the first British woman to win five Grammys.

British soul in the 2000s was dominated by women singers. Joss Stone, Natasha Bedingfield, Corinne Bailey Rae, Estelle, Amy Winehouse, Adele and Duffy enjoyed success in the American charts.

Corinne Bailey Rae released her debut album, Corinne Bailey Rae, in February 2006, and became the fourth female British act in history to have her first album debut at number one.

At the 50th Grammy Awards in 2008, Amy Winehouse won five awards, tying the then record for the most wins by a female artist in a single night and becoming the first British woman to win five Grammys.

=== Electronic music ===
The popularity of the Eurodance genre in the 1990s led to the considerable popularity of the trance genre in the late 1990s and early 2000s. Popular artists of the decade included ATB, A Touch of Class, Ian Van Dahl, Alice Deejay, BT, Fragma, Lasgo, iiO, Sylver, Groove Coverage, Robert Miles, Tiësto, Armin van Buuren, Paul van Dyk, Paul Oakenfold, John Digweed and Safri Duo.

Popular electronic artists of the decade in other electronic genres included Fatboy Slim, the Chemical Brothers, the Prodigy, Groove Armada, Basement Jaxx, Daft Punk, Massive Attack, Röyksopp, Pendulum, Justice, Portishead, Björk, Goldfrapp, M83, Orbital, Boards of Canada, Autechre, Above & Beyond, Günther, Eric Prydz, DJ Shadow, Scooter, Underworld, Aphex Twin, Squarepusher, the Crystal Method, deadmau5, the Knife, Fever Ray, Ladytron, Lamb, Zero 7 and David Guetta.

Media commentators did however observe during the 2000s that electronic dance music had returned somewhat to the "underground", with mainstream commercial interest in the genre waning following its peak in the 1990s. This was symbolized in the Brit Awards' decision in 2004 to remove its "Best Dance Act" category.

Electro, as well as house, became mainstream in the dance music scene in the middle of the decade, replacing the mainstream of more jazzy and Latin influenced sounds from the beginning of the decade. Electro house artists such as Benny Benassi, Bob Sinclar and MSTRKRFT gained popularity in clubs around the world. Dubstep and bassline house achieved more mainstream success within the dance music scene, with artists like Skream and T2 becoming well known. Dance and Eurodance singers and groups such as Kate Ryan, September, Alcazar, Basshunter, and Cascada became popular around the world during the 2000s.

Grime music emerged in the early 2000s and achieved commercial success, particularly in the UK, through artists such as Dizzee Rascal and Wiley.

== Oceania ==
=== Pop ===
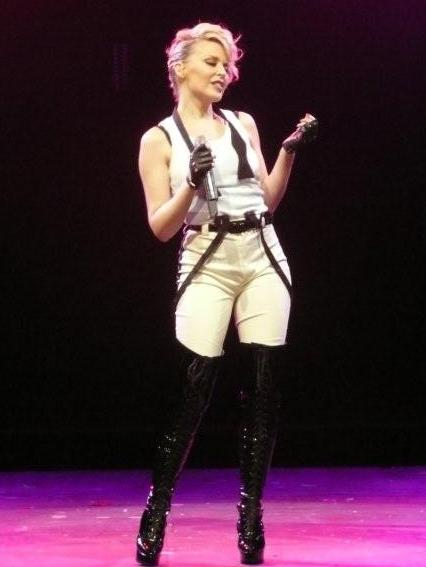
Kylie Minogue is considered the biggest Australian pop act of the decade.

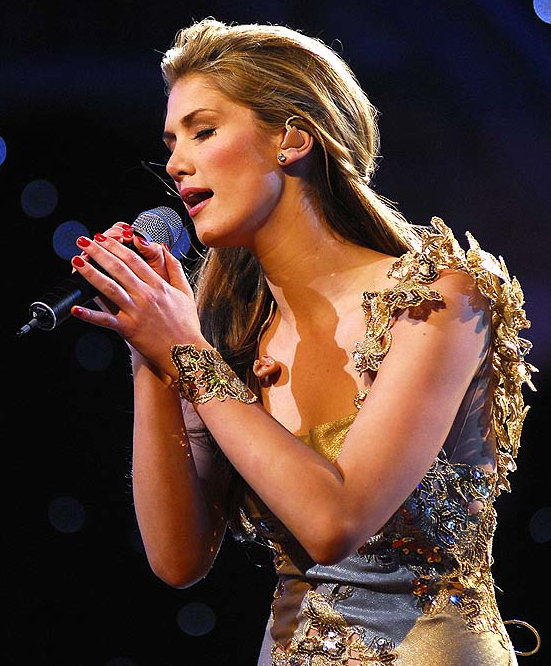
Delta Goodrem released her debut album Innocent Eyes in 2003 which became a monster smash hit – it went to No. 1 and stayed for 29 non-consecutive weeks, being certified 14× Platinum for selling over 1 million copies, the second most of all time in Australia.

The most successful Australian female artist, Kylie Minogue still had a huge presence on the Australian music scene with all four albums she released during the decade, with X being the last one, and charting at number one along with its lead single "2 Hearts" becoming her 10th Australian No.1 single.Vanessa Amorosi gained international fame with her debut album Power in 2000.

Ex-Neighbours star, Delta Goodrem released her debut album Innocent Eyes in 2003 which became a monster smash hit – it went to No. 1 and stayed for 29 non-consecutive weeks, being certified 14× Platinum for selling over 1 million copies, the second most of all time in Australia.

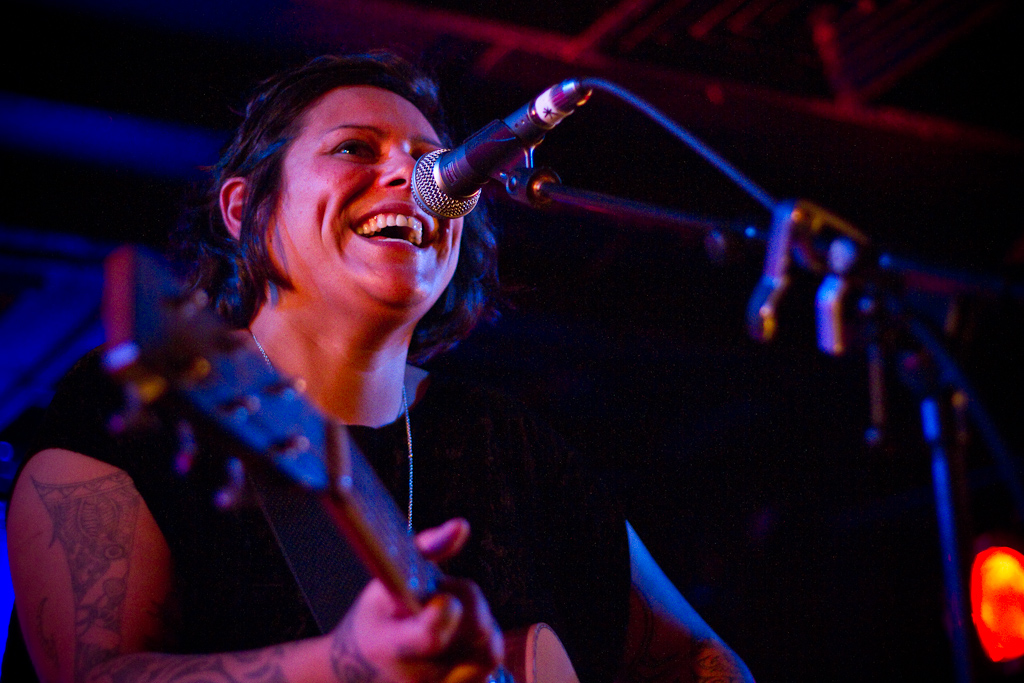
Anika Moa's debut studio album Thinking Room, released in 2001, reached number one on the New Zealand Albums Chart.

In 2008, singer Lenka rose to fame with the song "The Show" and her debut album Lenka.

In New Zealand, pop singer Brooke Fraser has seen large success throughout her music career with number one songs and countless New Zealand Music Awards wins. Other popular artists include, Aaradhna, Vince Harder, Anika Moa, Gin Wigmore, whose debut album Holy Smoke peaked at No. 1 in New Zealand in 2009 and Ladyhawke, who achieved substantial international success following the release of her self-titled debut album in 2008, which peaked at number one in New Zealand and charted in the top twenty in Australia and the United Kingdom. In 2009, she received several New Zealand Music Awards and ARIA music awards and was nominated for a BRIT award in 2010.

=== Rock ===
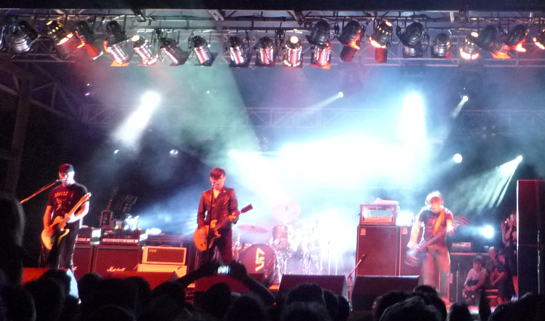
In 2002, Grinspoon performed at the Australian Record Industry Association Awards.

Many new rock and alternative groups/bands formed during the early years of this decade. The Vines and Jet become very popular amongst others around 2002–03, paving the way for a mass of new groups midway through the decade such as Wolfmother. Other popular artists include Powderfinger, The Vines, You Am I, Silverchair, AC/DC, Pendulum, The Living End, Spiderbait, Grinspoon, Kisschasy and Eskimo Joe.

Many rock artists in New Zealand were popular throughout the 2000s decade including, Evermore, The Feelers, Neil Finn, Tim Finn, and Liam Finn.

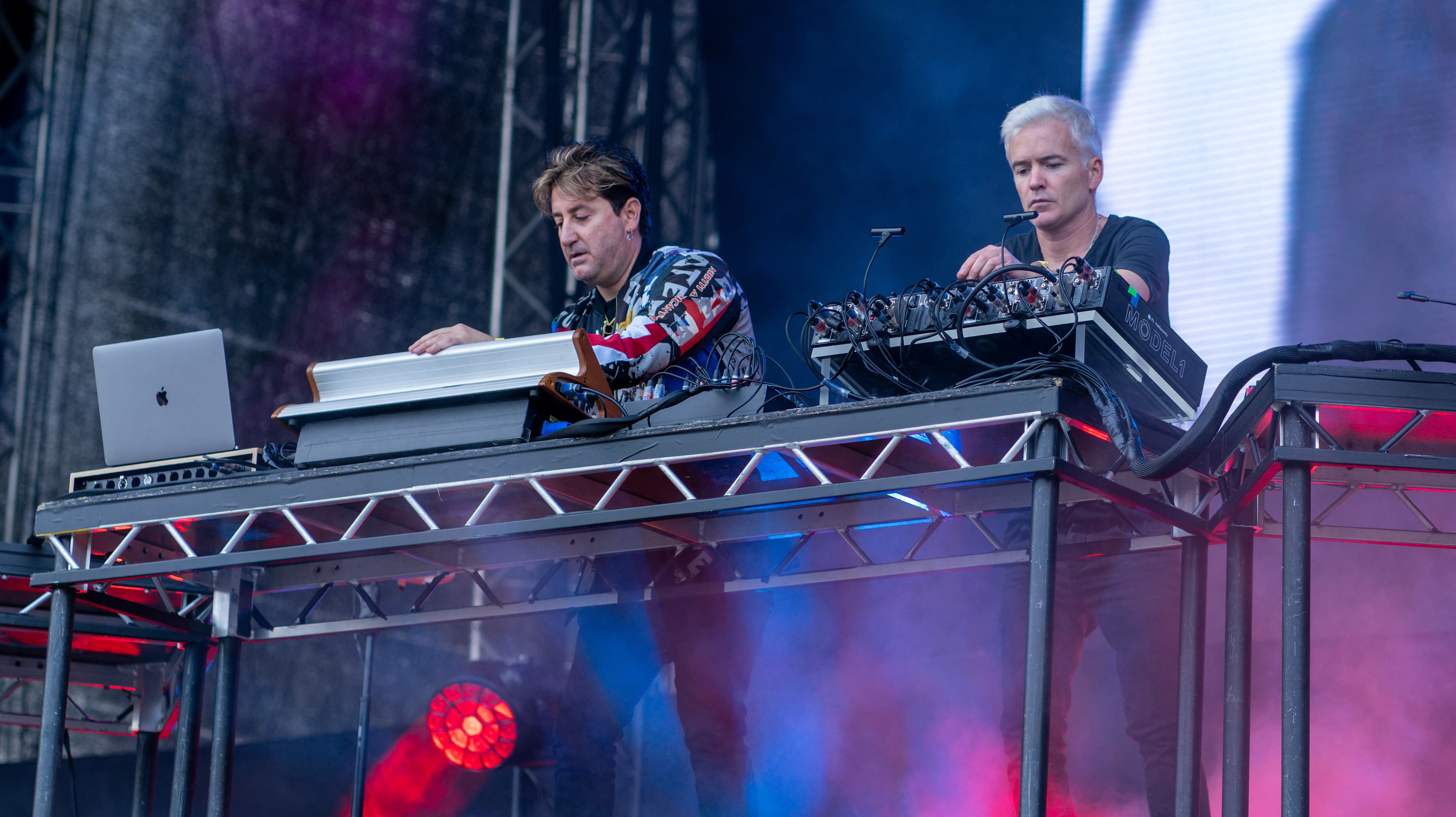
Australian electronic group The Avalanches released their debut album Since I Left You in 2000.

==== Alternative ====
From 2003 up until 2007, a popular American television show – The O.C. – popularized many New Zealand alternative rock bands by playing their music during the years of the series run. These bands included Evermore and Youth Group.

Australian electronic group The Avalanches released their debut album Since I Left You in 2000, composed completely of samples and gained critical acclaim.

=== R&B and soul ===
Throughout the 2000s decade, R&B and soul music had become more popular in Australia and New Zealand. Most Australian R&B artists from the early 2000s, such as Guy Sebastian, Paulini and Ricki-Lee Coulter, were known as contestants on Australian Idol and have established themselves in the Australian music market and continued to enjoy success after the show. Sebastian's debut album Just as I Am debuted at No. 1 on the ARIA Albums Chart and was certified six times platinum by the Australian Recording Industry Association (ARIA), becoming the highest selling album ever released by an Australian Idol contestant. He also has received 14 ARIA Music Awards nominations and is the only Australian male artist in Australian music history to achieve five No. 1 singles. Other Australian R&B/soul artists from the early 2000s include Jade MacRae, Israel Cruz, female duo Shakaya and boy band Random, who were best known for winning The X Factor in 2005. The late 2000s saw the rise of 2009 Australian Idol winner Stan Walker and 2006 Idol runner-up Jessica Mauboy.

In New Zealand, R&B/soul groups Adeaze and Nesian Mystik have enjoyed success throughout their careers. Singer Aaradhna has released three top-ten singles "Down Time", "I Love You Too", and "They Don't Know" with rapper Savage. Other R&B singers include Pieter T and Vince Harder. The late 2000s saw the rise of J. Williams and Erakah.

=== Hip-hop ===
Early into this decade, Australian hip-hop has proved ultimate success through an Adelaide hip-hop trio, Hilltop Hoods. They became the first successful Australian hip-hop outfit, followed by a Sydney hip-hop trio, Bliss n Eso. Each has achieved ARIA awards.

The New Zealand hip-hop scene has seen the success of artists such as Scribe, Savage, Smashproof, David Dallas, Young Sid, Nesian Mystik and P Money. In 2009, Smashproof and Gin Wigmore collaborated on the successful single "Brother", which stayed at No. 1 on the New Zealand charts for eleven weeks, breaking the 23-year-old record for the longest consecutive run at number one on the charts by a local artist. The single also charted in Germany.

== Latin America ==
=== Pop ===
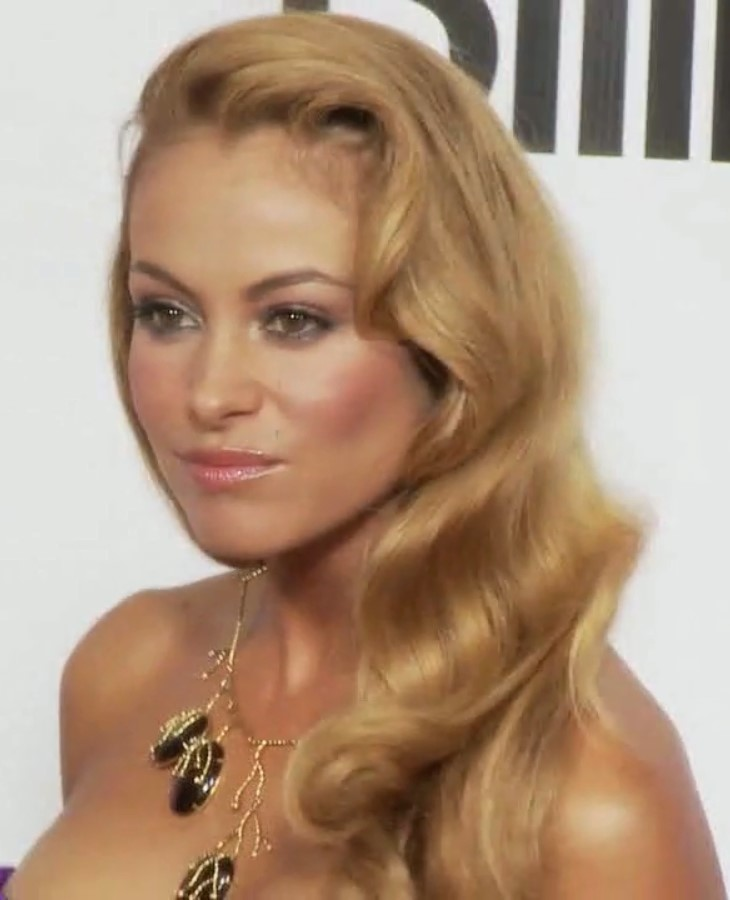
Paulina Rubio's Paulina remained on the Billboard Top Latin Albums chart for 99 weeks.

The Colombian Latin pop singer Shakira's breakthrough in the early 2000s led to her major international success in many non-Spanish-speaking countries, especially the United States in addition to the music scene of Latin America. In 2001, and aided by heavy rotation of the music video, "Whenever, Wherever", she broke through into the English-speaking world with the release of Laundry Service, which sold over 13 million copies worldwide. Four years later, Shakira released two album projects called Fijación Oral, Vol. 1 and Oral Fixation, Vol. 2. Both reinforced her success, particularly with one of the most successful song in the 21st century to date, "Hips Don't Lie" which sold over 10 million copies and downloads worldwide and hit No. 1 in many countries. From October–November 2009 Shakira released her latest album She Wolf worldwide. Due to her massive international success during the 2000s, she is considered the second most successful female Latin singer.

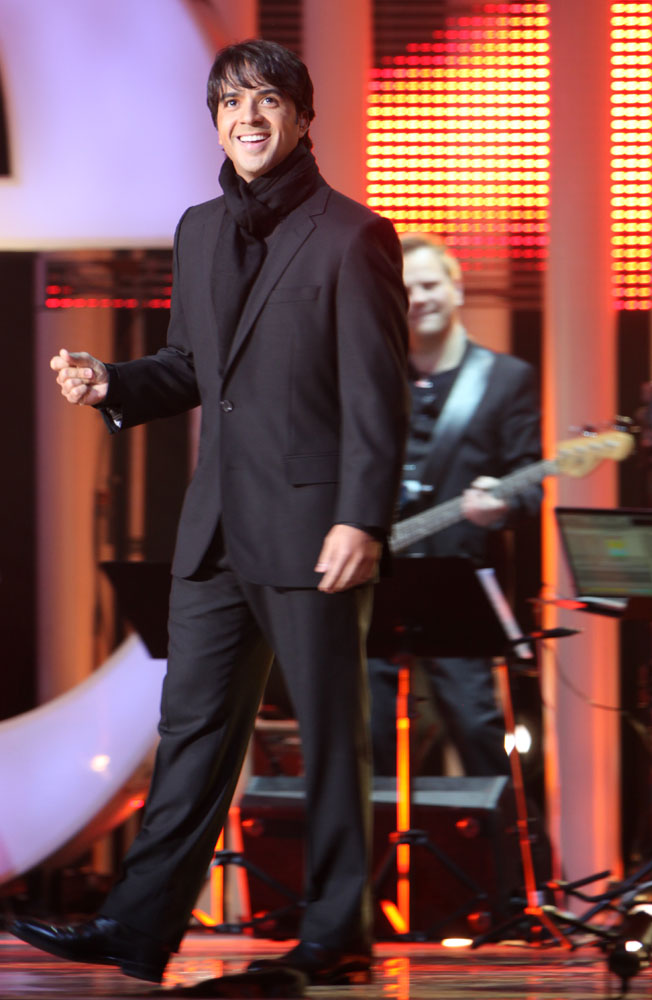
Luis Fonsi's "Nada Es Para Siempre" received a nomination for Latin Pop Airplay Song of the Year at the 2006 Latin Billboard Music Awards.

In the early 2000s, Mexican pop star Paulina Rubio became the best-selling artist thanks to the success of her eponymous album Paulina (2000). It remained on the Billboard Top Latin Albums chart for 99 weeks, and became the first Latin pop album by a Mexican artist to receive a gold certification from the Recording Industry Association of America (RIAA) for shipments of 500,000 units in the United States. Her follow-up album, Border Girl (2002), also achieved gold certification. Rubio is the best-selling Mexican pop singer in the United States.

Pop rock begins to take shape in Latin music with acts such as RBD, Camila, Kany García, Jesse & Joy, Belinda Peregrin and Ha*Ash. Also, more established pop acts such as Pepe Aguilar, Alejandro Fernández, Luis Fonsi, and ex-OV7 member Kalimba would use pop rock in their repertoires. Pop-rock music hits new highs in the 2000s with acts such as Maná, Juanes, Julieta Venegas and the highly anticipated comeback of 90s Mexican Pop Queen, Gloria Trevi in the second half of the decade. In 2004, Gloria Trevi released her first studio album, Como Nace el Universo, in ten years.

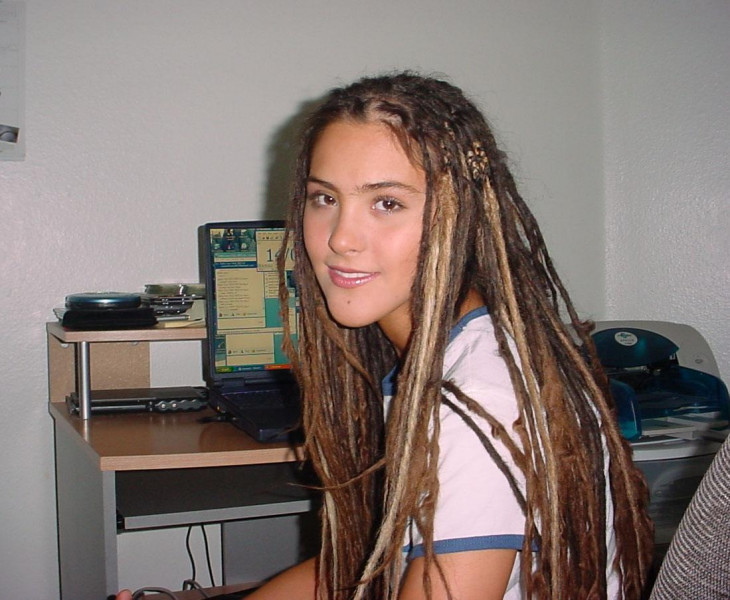
Lynda Thomas released successful rock singles in 2000 and 2001.

=== Rock ===
During the early 2000s, Lynda Thomas had notable success as an alternative rock act around the world, including the U.S. Latin market, a success carried over since the 1990s, first as a eurodance act; she scored successful rock singles in 2000 and 2001, including "A Mil Por Hora", "Lo Mejor De Mí" and "Estoy Viva". Bands like Soda Stereo (Argentina), Caifanes (Mexico), and Los Fabulosos Cadillacs (Argentina) remained influential, while new acts emerged to carry the torch forward. This included bands like Café Tacvba (Mexico), Los Bunkers (Chile), and Babasónicos (Argentina), who infused rock with elements of regional music and experimental sounds.

=== Reggaetón ===
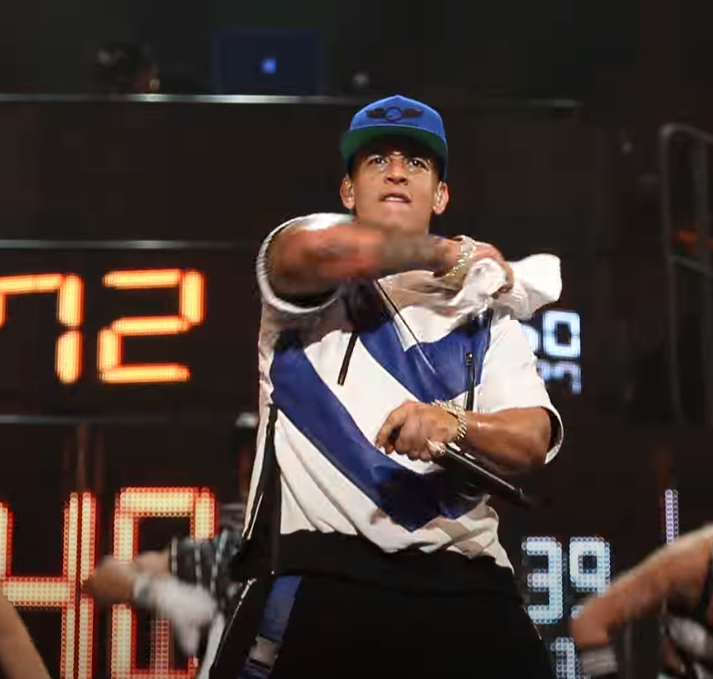
In 2004, Daddy Yankee released his international hit single "Gasolina", which is credited with introducing reggaeton to audiences worldwide, and making the music genre a global phenomenon.

In 2002, the New York-based group Aventura would reinvent bachata, thus making it a dominant Latin genre. By 2004, reggaetón would become a staple in music with acts such as Don Omar, Daddy Yankee, Ivy Queen and Wisin & Yandel. By the mid-2000s, reggaetón had replaced salsa, merengue and cumbia as the main dance genre in nightclubs for young people all over Latin America, reaching popularity in parts of Spain and Italy as well. But by the end of 2007, this craze soon declined in popularity.

=== Salsa and merengue ===
Although salsa and merengue began to decline in popularity, merengue would have new life injected thanks to the subgenre known as, "merengue de calle" (or street merengue). Beginning in 2004, this subgenre combining elements of merengue, rap, and reggaetón would be popularized by Dominican acts such as Omega, Silvio Mora, El Sujeto, and Tito Swing.

== Asia ==
With the rapid development of Asian economies during the 1990s and 2000s, the independent music industries of Asia have seen considerable growth. Asian countries like Japan, China, and India have some of the largest music markets in the world. Supported by their large markets, the music charts in Asia are largely dominated by local Asian artists, with very few artists from the Western world managing to break into those markets.

J-pop and K-pop have become increasingly influenced by contemporary R&B, hip-hop and Eurobeat, and they have become popular all over the Far East region. Meanwhile, in the Southern Asia region, the rising independent Indian pop scene, often characterized by its fusion of Indian and non-Indian sounds, has begun to increasingly compete with the popularity of Bollywood filmi music in the region. In Southeast Asia, especially Singapore and Indonesia, straight-ahead jazz saw a revival in the second half of the decade. P-pop refers to contemporary pop music in the Philippines originating from the OPM genre. With its beginnings in the late 1970s, Pinoy pop is a growing genre in the year of 2020s. From the 1990s to the 2000s, OPM pop was regularly showcased in the live band scene.

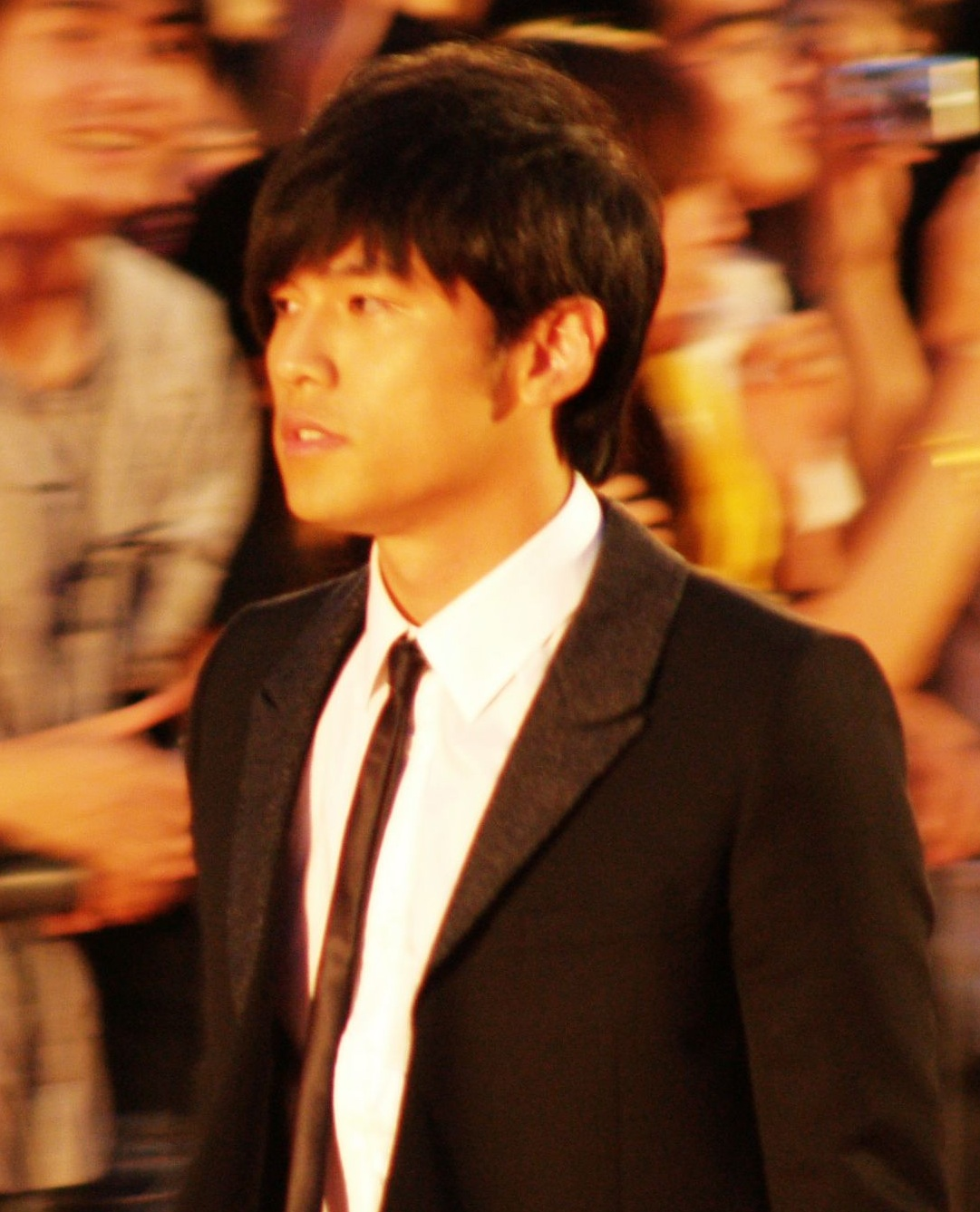
Jay Chou was a dominant force in Asian music for almost all of the 2000s and the first half of the next decade.

=== C-pop ===
The appearance of Hong Kong national William Hung on American Idol in 2004, proved to be very popular with many locals of East Asia and Southeast Asia. This resulted in a new generation of young local artists, both solo singers as well as bands, having hit records during this period. Later in 2004, Hung would hold his first solo concert at the Esplanade Theatre in Singapore.

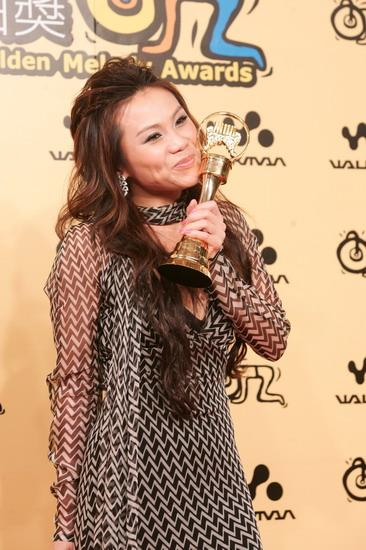
Singer-songwriter-guitarist Tanya Chua was successful during the 2000s as a leading Mandopop artist.

Taiwanese boy band F4's first big hit "Meteor Rain", from the album of the same name, established them as the dominant boyband of the first half of the decade. The four members of F4 also had solo hits, such as Jerry Yen's "One Metre", Vanness Wu's "My Friend" (an adaptation of the Robert Burns poem "Auld Lang Syne"), Ken Chu's "Never Stopping", and Vic Chou's "Make a wish".

Jay Chou's first solo album Jay in 2000, blended Mandarin pop with elements of American R&B and hip-hop, establishing a musical style that would become influential in the Mandopop genre. Over the following decade, Chou gained widespread popularity across East Asia, releasing multiple best-selling albums and winning several awards, including multiple Golden Melody Awards in Taiwan. His innovative production style and lyrical themes contributed significantly to the evolution of contemporary Chinese-language pop music.

Among solo female artists of the 2000s, Stefanie Sun of Singapore was the most outstanding. Her 2000 eponymous debut album featured a remake of an old Hokkien pop song, "Cloudy Day"; and it earned her a Golden Melody Award for Best New Artist.

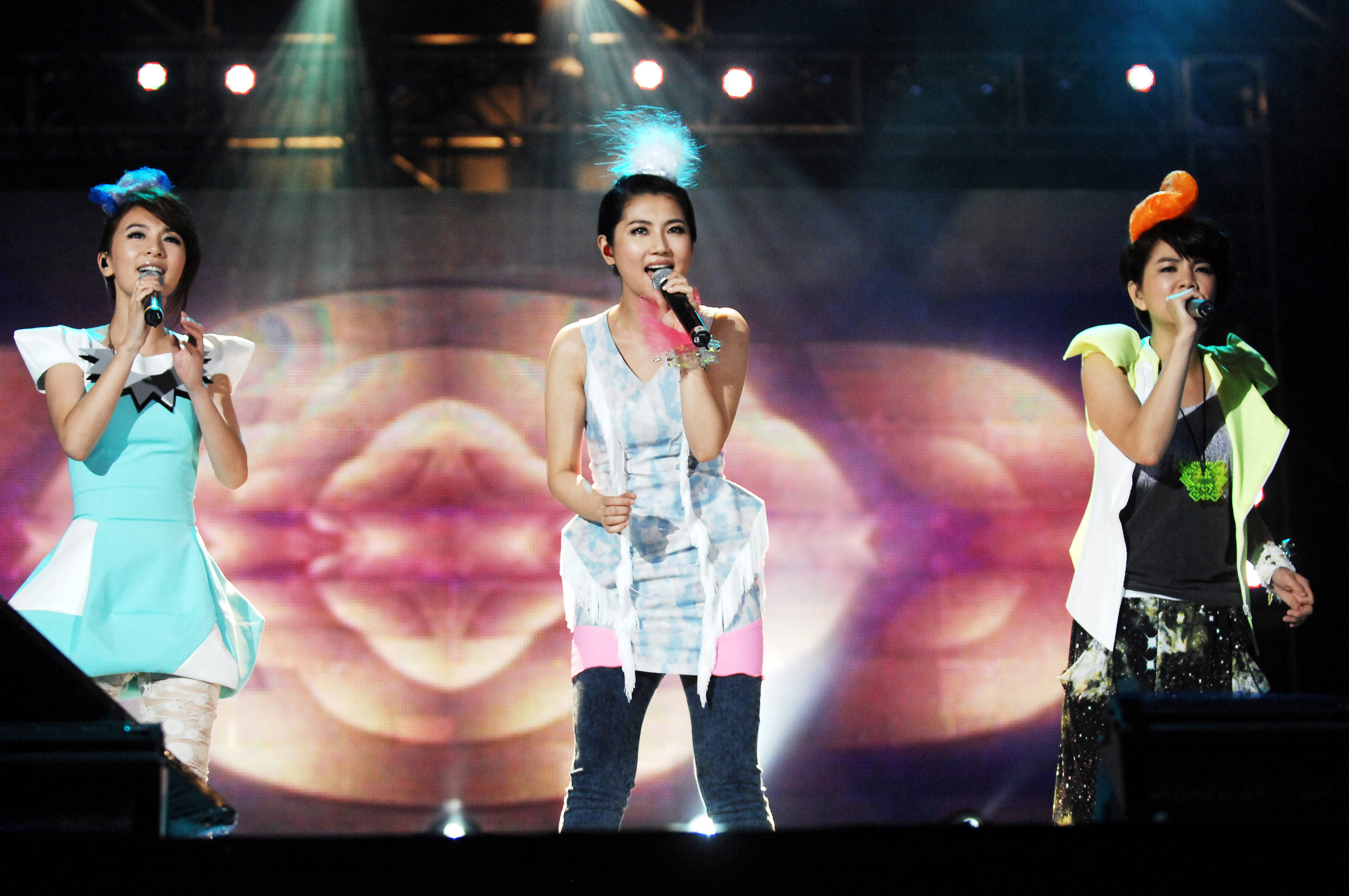
In Taiwan alone, 250,000 copies of S.H.E's Super Star were sold.

Singer-songwriter-guitarist Tanya Chua was successful during this period as a leading Mandopop artist. Her 2000 album I Do Believe garnered a nomination for Best New Artist at the Golden Melody Awards. Chua also wrote songs or produced albums for several other established singers during this period, for instance, "Wrong Number" for Faye Wong.

The most popular girl group of this period was S.H.E, comprising Selina Jen, Hebe Tien, and Ella Chen. Their first big hit, from their fourth album Super Star, was their cover of the Bee Gees' "I.O.I.O.". In Taiwan alone, 250,000 copies of Super Star were sold.

In the second half of the decade, straight-ahead jazz saw a surge of popularity in Asia, in particular after the release in 2006 of the debut album, Let Me Sing!, from 15-year-old Indonesian jazz virtuoso Nathan Hartono. Singapore-based wind orchestra The Philharmonic Winds, formed at the beginning of the decade, also played a major part in the revival of jazz in Asia. In 2009, Singapore's Esplanade Theatre would found its own jazz festival especially meant for young bands and artistes; it was originally called Bright Young Things, but it would later be renamed Mosaic Jazz Fellows.

Contemporary Christian music artistes also found their way into Asian secular music charts for the first time ever during the 2000s. Mi Lu Bing was a three-piece band that had originally started out playing for worship in their church, but later would release secular-themed albums and songs, including their opening and ending theme songs to the 2007 local television serial, The Golden Path. Sun Ho had been the worship pastor at megachurch City Harvest Church before she released her first album of secular material, Sun With Love, in 2002. She would go on to release another four albums between 2003 and 2007, although her secular music career eventually came to an abrupt ending with the City Harvest Trial.Twelve Girls Band debuted in 2004 to US market.

Taiwanese supergroup SuperBand, comprising Wakin Chau, Jonathan Lee, Chang Chen-yue, and Lo Ta-Yu, emerged in 2008 and went on to hold several concerts and release two studio EPs of new material, Northbound (2009) and Go South (2010), before finally resuming their individual solo careers in 2010.

2003 saw the deaths of Hong Kong popular singers Leslie Cheung, 46, who committed suicide; and Anita Mui, 40, who died of cervical cancer. Both singers were highly respected in Cantopop music.

=== J-pop ===
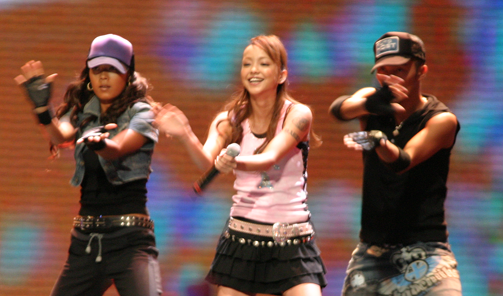
Following her 1990's success, Namie Amuro remained popular during this era.

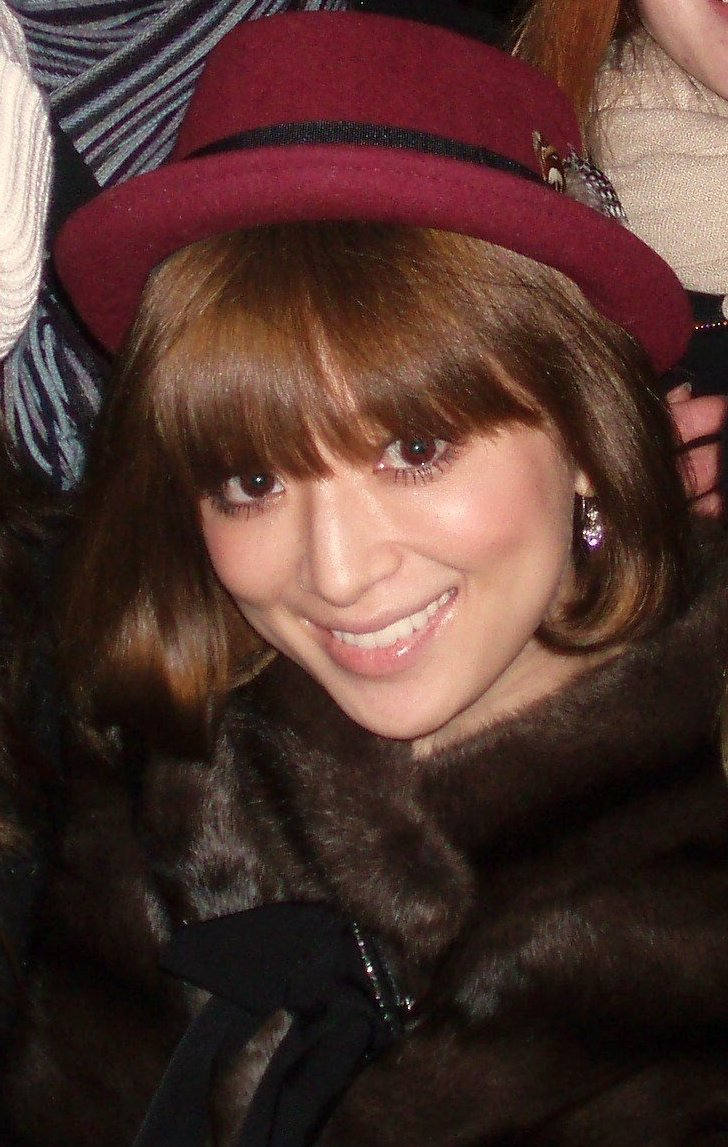
Ayumi Hamasaki was one of the most popular Japanese stars of the 2000s, known as "The Empress of Japanese Pop".

Japanese Pop's popularity continued to expand through Asia and the rest of the world, with various Japanese artists debuting in the U.S. J-pop starts to enjoy a relatively big global online fan base. At the end of the decade, dance music and techno become the most popular genres. Bubblegum pop remains popular during the entire decade. Ayumi Hamasaki was one of the most popular Japanese stars of the 2000s, known as "The Empress of Japanese Pop". Ken Hirai was the most popular male solo artist. 1990s divas like Namie Amuro, Misia, and Hikaru Utada remained popular during this era, with Utada having a second popularity boom in 2008. Starlet Kumi Koda became popular in this era, due to her provocative dance moves. Boy bands were the most popular musical format, with girl bands like Morning Musume experiencing a decline in popularity. Johnny's boy bands, notably Arashi, became very popular. Vocal groups like Exile and Tohoshinki gained popularity and pop/rock bands like Mr. Children, Tokio and Glay remained popular. English pop music's popularity expanded with popular U.S. artists receiving success such as Backstreet Boys and Britney Spears two of the most successful non-Japanese artists.

=== K-pop ===
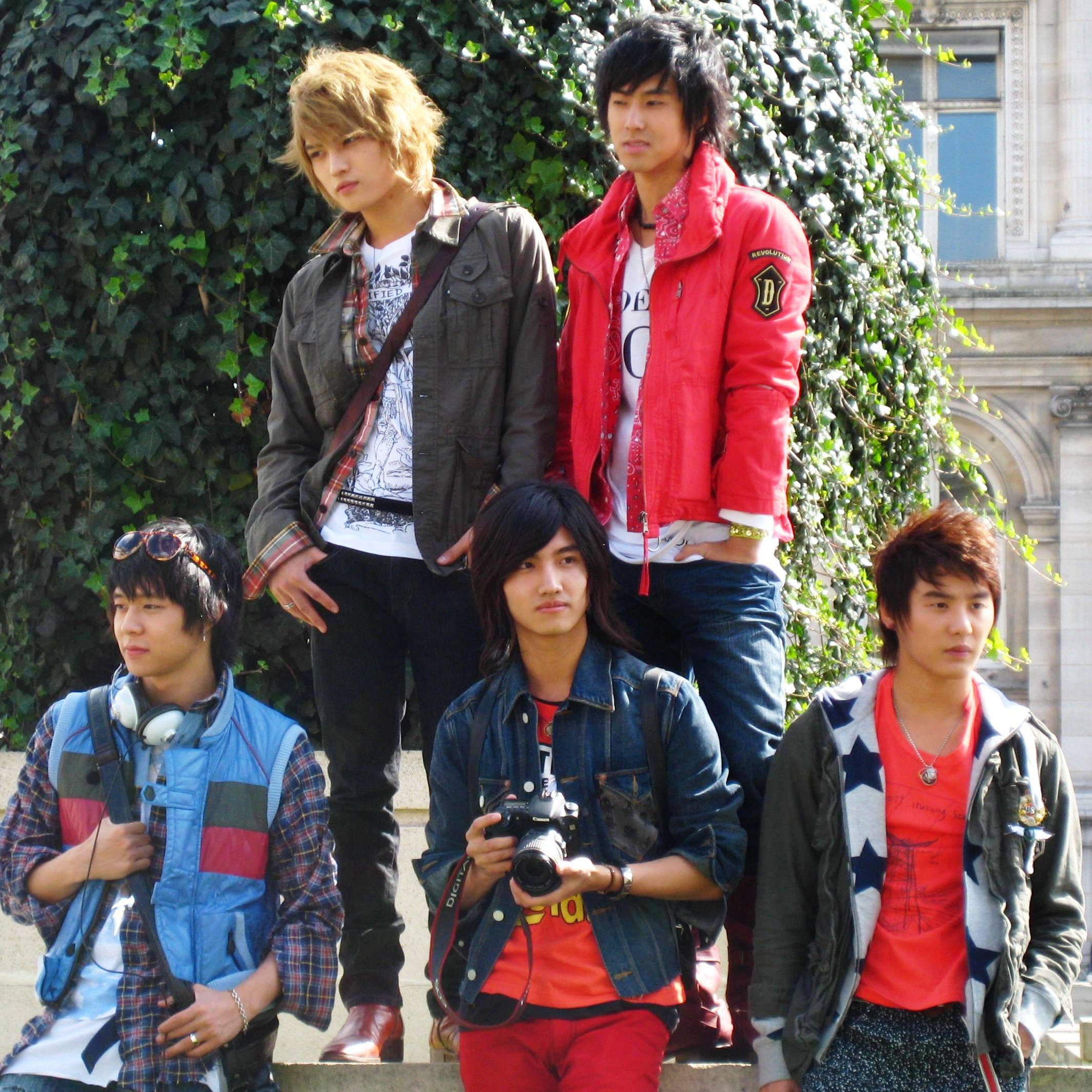
In 2007, it took four hours for TVXQ to sell out 33,000 seats for a series of concerts in Seoul.

By the beginning of the 21st century, the K-pop market had slumped and early K-pop idol groups that had seen success in the 90s were on the decline. H.O.T. disbanded in 2001, while other groups like Sechs Kies, S.E.S., Fin.K.L, Shinhwa, and g.o.d became inactive by 2005.

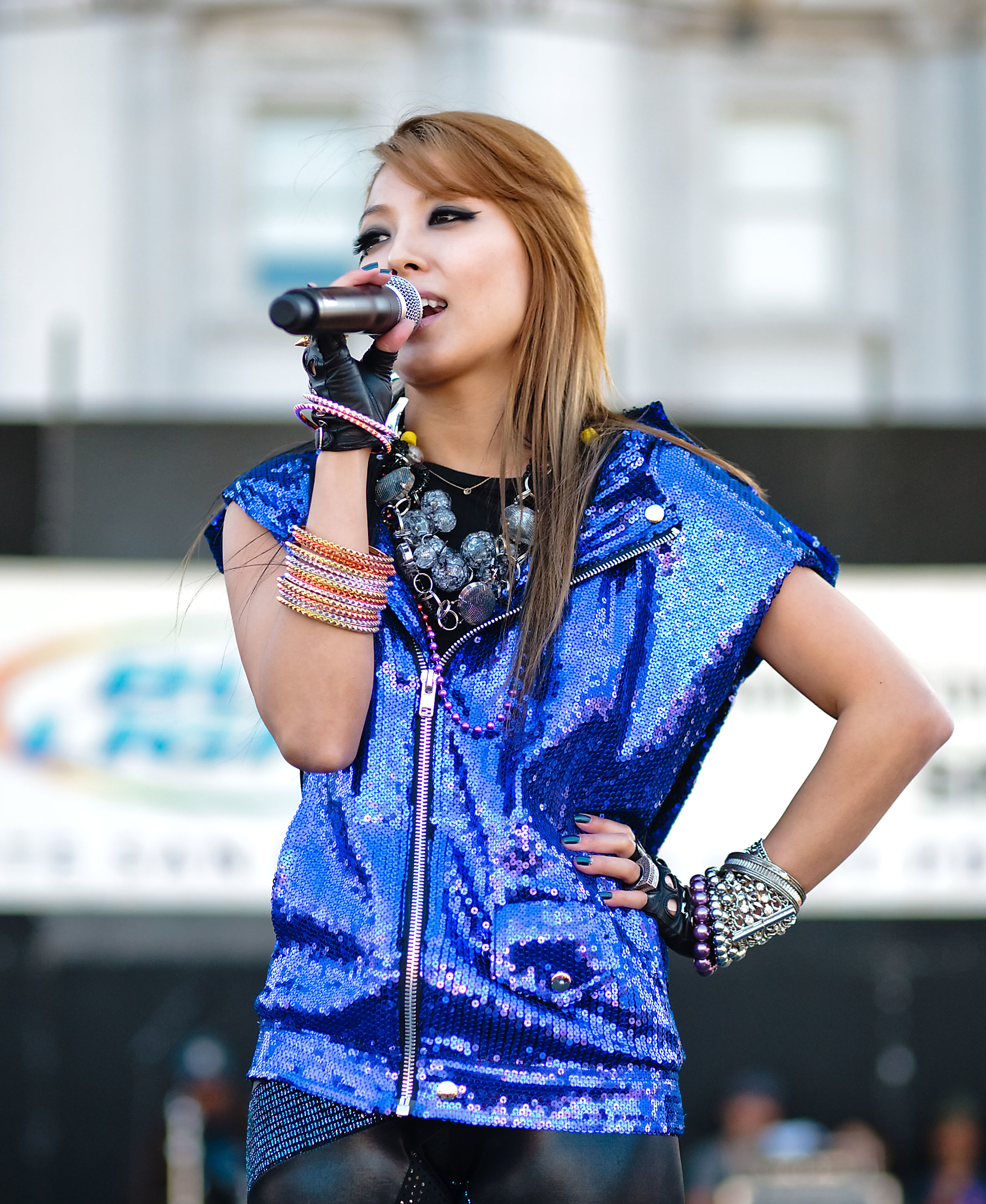
BoA's No. 1 was the fourth-best-selling record of 2002 in South Korea.

Solo singers like BoA, Rain, and Lee Hyori grew in success. However, the success of the boy band TVXQ after its debut in 2003 marked the resurgence of idol groups to Korean entertainment and the growth of K-pop as part of Hallyu. The birth of second-generation K-pop was followed with the successful debuts of SS501, Super Junior, BigBang, Wonder Girls, Girls' Generation, Kara, Shinee, 2NE1, 4Minute, T-ara, f(x), and After School.

=== Indian pop ===
The Indian music industry was previously dominated by the filmi music of Bollywood for much of the late 20th century. The 2000s saw increasing popularity of independent Indian pop music that could compete with Bollywood film music. Indian pop music began distinguishing itself from mainstream Bollywood music with its fusion of Indian and non-Indian sounds, which later had on influence an Bollywood music itself. Indian pop has itself been partly influenced by the Asian Underground scene emerging in the United Kingdom among British Asian artists such as Bally Sagoo, Apache Indian, Panjabi MC, Raghav and the Rishi Rich Project (featuring Rishi Rich, Jay Sean and Juggy D). India has one of the largest music markets in the world, though like other developing nations, suffers from high levels of piracy.

Indian music has also had an increasing influence on popular music in the Western world. The music of South Asia has influenced Europe's pop mainstream as acts like Björk, Bananarama, Erasure, and Siouxsie and the Banshees all released singles or remixes featuring South Asian instrumentation. Indian music has also influenced mainstream American hip-hop, R&B and urban music in the 2000s, including artists/producers such as Timbaland, Jay-Z, Dr. Dre, Truth Hurts, The Black Eyed Peas, Missy Elliott and Britney Spears. According to DJ Green Lantern, "Indian beats have now become a fixture on the R&B scene". Several Hollywood musical films such as Moulin Rouge! have incorporated Bollywood songs, while several Indian music composers have gained international fame, particularly A. R. Rahman who, having sold over 300 million records worldwide, is one of the best-selling music artists of all time. M.I.A., a British-born Sri Lankan electronic artist incorporates Bollywood songs in her music.

=== Indo pop ===
In the early until the middle of 2000s, the most popular music genre in Indonesia was pop and pop rock music. Some group bands like Slank, Dewa 19, Sheila on 7, Padi, Noah, Radja, ST12, Ungu were top bands and their songs were the most played songs by teens and young adults. Some of these 2000s bands' most popular songs were Sheila on 7 – "Sebuah Kisah Klasik", Dewa 19 – "Separuh Nafas", Padi – "Menanti Sebuah Jawaban", Peterpan/Noah – "Ku Katakan Dengan Indah", etc.

=== P-pop ===
In the early 1970s, Pinoy music or Pinoy pop emerged, often sung in Tagalog. It was a mix of rock, folk and ballads making political use of music similar to early hip-hop but transcending class. The music was a "conscious attempt to create a Filipino national and popular culture" and it often reflected social realities and problems. As early as 1973, the Juan de la Cruz Band was performing "Ang Himig Natin" ("Our Music"), which is widely regarded as the first example of Pinoy rock. "Pinoy" gained popular currency in the late 1970s in the Philippines when a surge in patriotism made a hit song of Filipino folk singer Heber Bartolome's "Tayo'y mga Pinoy" ("We are Pinoys"). This trend was followed by Filipino rapper Francis Magalona's "Mga Kababayan Ko" ("My Countrymen") in the 1990s and Filipino rock band Bamboo's "Noypi" ("Pinoy" in reversed syllables) in the 2000s. Nowadays, Pinoy is used as an adjective for some terms highlighting their relationship to the Philippines or Filipinos. Pinoy rock was soon followed by Pinoy folk and later, Pinoy jazz. Although the music was often used to express opposition to then Philippine president Ferdinand Marcos and his use of martial law and the creation of the Batasang Bayan, many of the songs were more subversive and some just instilled national pride. Perhaps because of the culturally affirming nature and many of the songs seemingly being non-threatening, the Marcos administration ordered radio stations to play at least one – and later, three – Pinoy songs each hour. Pinoy music was greatly employed both by Marcos and political forces who sought to overthrow him.

== Middle East and Africa ==
Music charts in the Middle East are largely dominated by local Arabic-language artists, with an equivalent population of Western world artists as well. The music industry within the Middle East and Africa is international and diverse.

=== Afrobeats ===
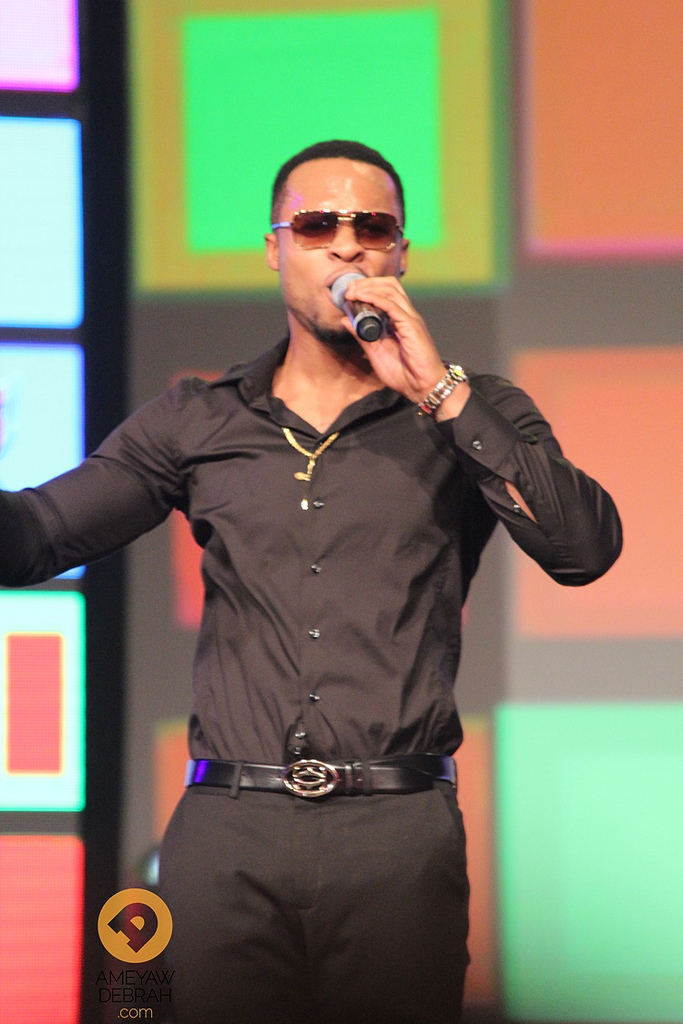
During the decade, Flavour N'abania was able to find success by embracing older genres, such as highlife, and remixing them into something more modern.

Styles of music that make up afrobeats largely began sometime in the late 90s and early-mid-2000s. With the launching of MTV Base Africa in 2005, West Africa was given a large platform through which artists could grow. Artists such as MI Abaga, Naeto C and Sarkodie were among the first to take advantage of this, however most of the artists were merely making interpretations of American hip-hop and R&B. Prior to this, groups such as Trybesmen, Plantashun Boiz, and The Remedies were early pioneers that fused modern American influences from hip-hop and R&B with local melodies. While this allowed them to build local audiences, it blocked them from a wider platform due to the language barriers in-place. P-Square released their album Game Over in 2007, which was unique for its usage of Nigerian rhythms and melodies. Meanwhile, artists such as Flavour N'abania were able to find success by embracing older genres, such as highlife, and remixing it into something more modern. By 2009 artists within the burgeoning scene were beginning to become stars across the continent and beyond. The style of music had a variety of names which made it difficult to market outside of Africa.

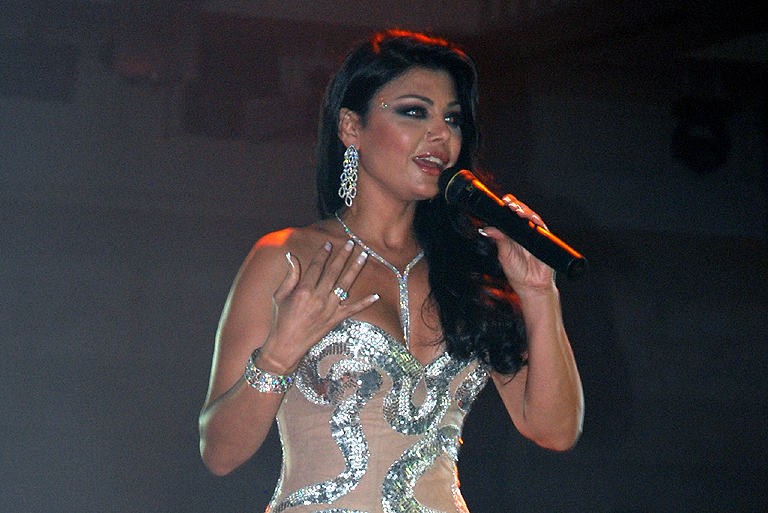
Haifa Wehbe released her second studio album Baddi Aech (Arabic: بدي عيش, English: "I Want to Live") in early 2005, following the success of lead single "Ya Hayat Albi." Released after the assassination of Lebanese politician Rafik Hariri, the title single of the album is about "freedom, considered to be among the most basic of human rights".

=== Arabic pop music ===
Arabic pop is mainly produced and originated in Cairo, Egypt; as Egyptian music genre is by far the most widespread within the region. Also Beirut, Lebanon, and Gulf states come as secondary centers. It is an outgrowth of the Arabic film industry (mainly Egyptian movies), also predominantly located in Cairo. Since 2000, various locations in the Gulf countries have been producing Khaleeji pop music. The primary style is a genre that synthetically combines pop melodies with elements of different Arabic regional styles, called ughniyah (Arabic: أغنية) or in English "song". It uses a wide variety of instruments, including electric guitars or electronic keyboards, as well as traditional Middle Eastern instruments like the oud, darbukka or qanun and many more. Another characteristic aspect of Arabic pop is the overall tone and mood of the songs. The majority of the songs are in a minor key, and the lyrics tend to focus on longing, melancholy, strife, and generally love issues.

Although tame by Western standards, female Arab popstars have been known to cause controversy with their sexuality. Playful lyrics, skimpy costumes, and dancing have led to quite a bit of criticism in the more conservative Islamic circles. Artists such as, Samira Said, Nancy Ajram, Nawal El Zoghbi, Latifa, Assala, Amal Hijazi and Haifa Wehbe have all come under fire at one time or another for the use of sexual innuendos in their music. This has led to bans on their music and performances in certain countries; particularly in Haifa's case. In 2002, a video by Samira Said called "Youm Wara Youm" was banned by the Egyptian Parliament for being 'too sexy', similar to Nancy Ajram's music video "Akhasmak Ah". In addition Amal Hijazi's music video of "Baya al Ward" was heavily criticised and banned on a few music channels. Such extremes are rare, but such kinds of censorship are not uncommon for Arab female popstars.

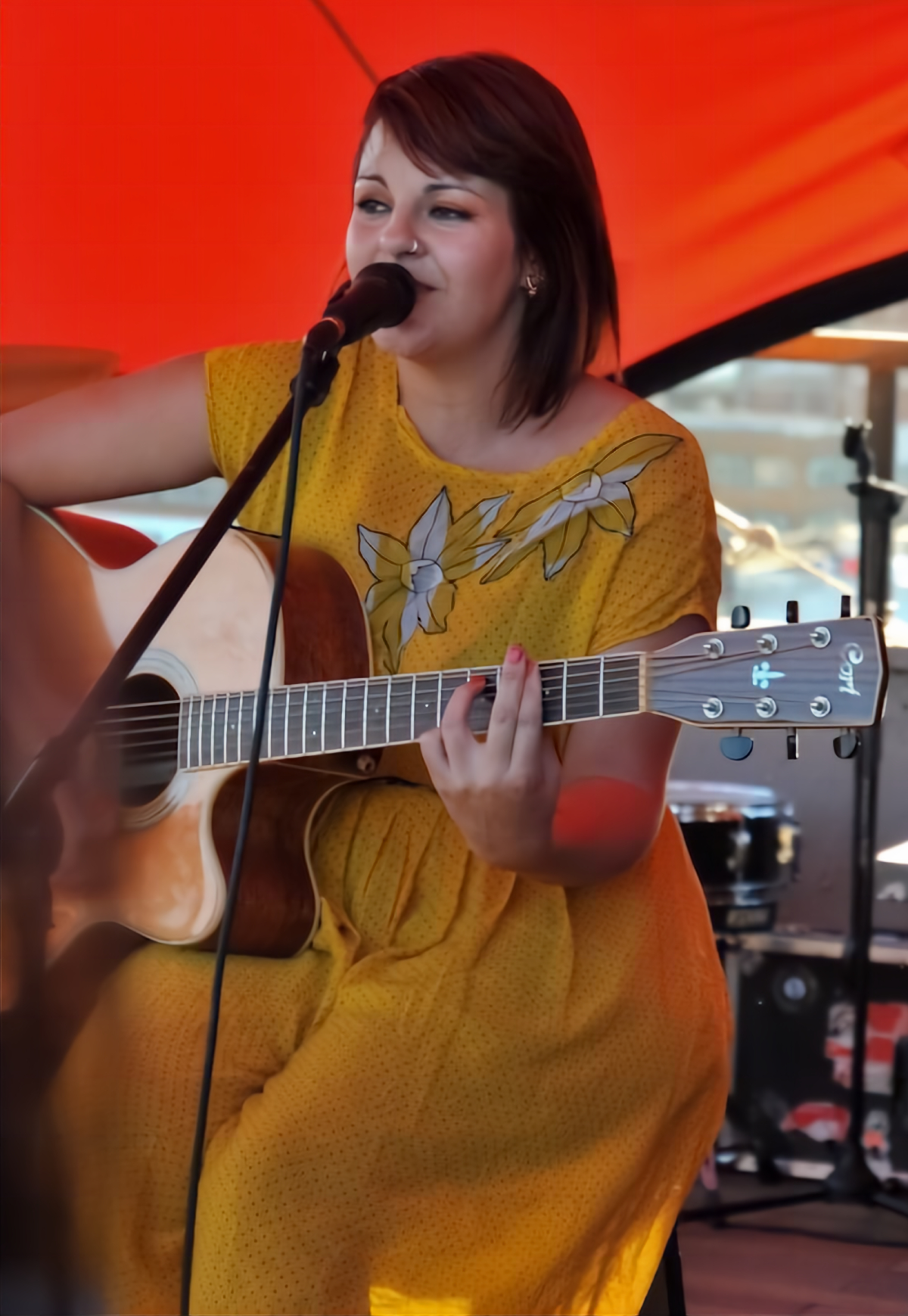
Tasha Baxter's breakthrough in the international music charts started with "In the Beginning" in 2002.

=== Drum and bass ===
The South African drum and bass scene began in the mid nineties. In 2000, events such as Homegrown became a prominent fixture in Cape Town and a launching platform for international and local artists such as Counterstrike, SFR, Niskerone, Tasha Baxter, Anti Alias and Rudeone. Other regular events include It Came From The Jungle in Cape Town and Science Friksun in Johannesburg.

A weekly Sublime drum and bass radio show is hosted by Hyphen on Bush Radio.

=== Hip-hop ===
==== Botswana ====
Phat Boy etc. has done a lot to promote Botswana hip-hop. The hip-hop movement in Botswana has grown over the years as evidenced by the release over the years of albums and songs from artists such as Mr Doe, Zeus, Touch Motswak Tswak, Ignition, S.C.A.R, Awesomore.aka Gaddamit, Cashless Society, Nitro, Konkrete, HT, Flex, Dice, Dj Dagizus, 3rd Mind, Kast, Nomadic, and Draztik to name a few. The release of hip-hop albums is slow because of the small market and competition from other genres of mostly dance-oriented music. Since 2000 hip-hop has achieved more prominence in Botswana, with rappers like Scar Kast and Third Mind releasing relatively successful albums. In 2006, Scar released his sophomore offering, "Happy Hour". The same year Kast released "Dazzit". S.C.A.R has since won a Channel O Spirit of Africa Award 2007 for best hip-hop.

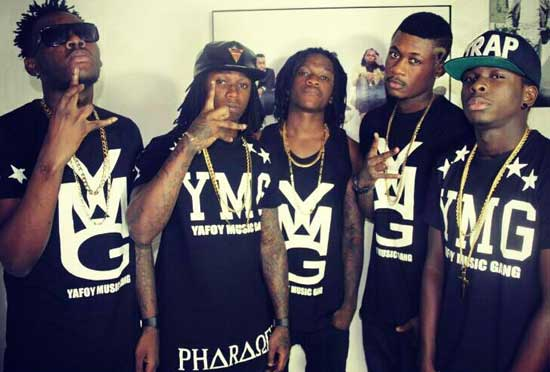
Kiff No Beat is an Ivorian hip-hop group from Abidjan. It was formed in 2009, and composed of five members.

==== Côte d'Ivoire ====
Ivorian hip-hop became a mainstream part of the popular music of Côte d'Ivoire beginning in 2009 after the victory of Ivorian hip-hop group Kiff No Beat at the hip-hop contest Faya Flow, and has been fused with many of the country's native styles, such as zouglou. There is a kind of gangsta rap-influenced Ivorian hip-hop called rap dogba. Ivorian Hip Hop is mostly in the French language, but includes nouchi (Ivorian Slang).

==== Madagascar ====
On 21 June 2007, UNICEF chose a 15-year-old Malagasy rap star, Name Six as its first-ever Junior Goodwill Ambassador for Eastern and Southern Africa. The young rapper's work continues the genre's tradition of social critique and political commentary, focusing largely on the challenges faced by children in underprivileged communities in Madagascar and voicing the views and concerns of the young, who are routinely omitted from political decision-making processes.

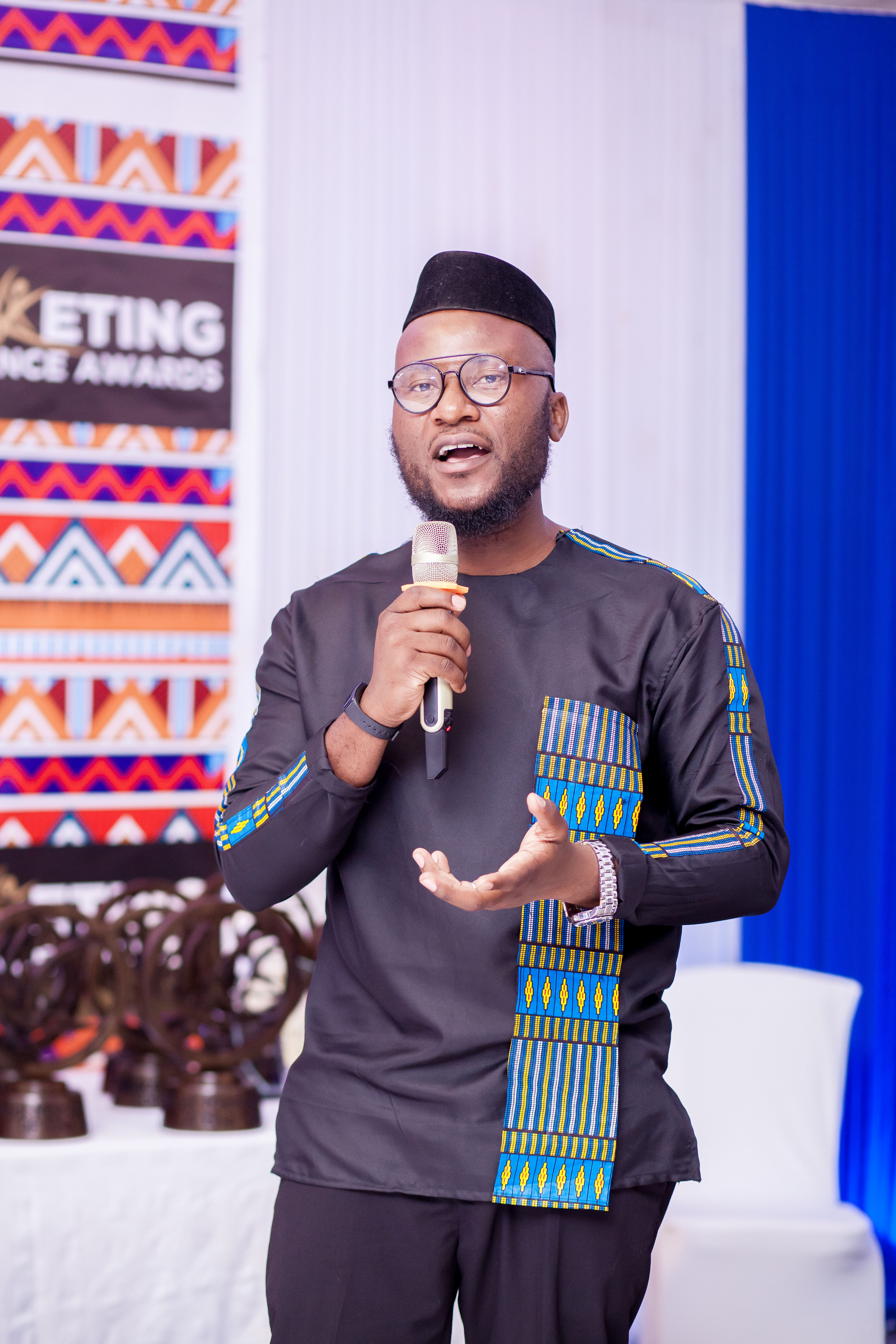
In 2009, Phyzix released his debut studio album The Lone Ranger LP which contained the hit singles Cholapitsa and Gamba.

==== Malawi ====
Hip-hop culture in Malawi is relatively young. Notable rappers who were early on the scene include Criminal A, Bantu Clan, Real Elements, Dynamike, Dominant 1, Knight of the Round Table, and Wisdom Chitedze. The scene started to gain traction in the late 90s and expanded further in the early 2000s when cheap computers and recording gear became widely available to artists. The launch of Television Malawi in 1999 provided a platform for rappers to have their music videos beamed to a national audience. The music video to Wisdom Chitedze's song Tipewe was on regular rotation on the station in its early days. In the early to mid-2000s artists such as Nospa G, M Krazy, David Kalilani, and Gosple helped push the music further. A lot of Malawi's early hip-hop music contained social commentary, religious, and introspective themes.

By the late 2000s the scene had picked up further with artists such as Barry One, Basement, Mandela Mwanza, Hyphen, Fredokiss, and Tay Grin gaining notoriety. Tay Grin's music video for the song Stand Up was featured considerably on Channel O. He was not the first Malawian rapper to get his song on that station; that accolade goes to the Real Elements. However, Tay Grin's got much more airplay. In 2009, Phyzix released his debut studio album The Lone Ranger LP which contained the hit singles Cholapitsa and Gamba. Around the same time, Christian rap started to gain popularity and that movement was spearheaded by Manyanda Nyasulu, DJ Kali, KBG, Double Zee, Liwu, C-Scripture, Asodzi, Erasto, and Sintha.

==== Niger ====
Hip-hop groups began to appear and perform in Niamey in 1998. In August 2004, UNICEF opened its "Scene Ouverte Rap", where 45 new groups entered selections among an informal count of 300 existing groups. Shows took place at Niamey's Jean Rouch Centre Culturel Franco – Nigerien (CCFN) in August 2004.

==== Palestine ====
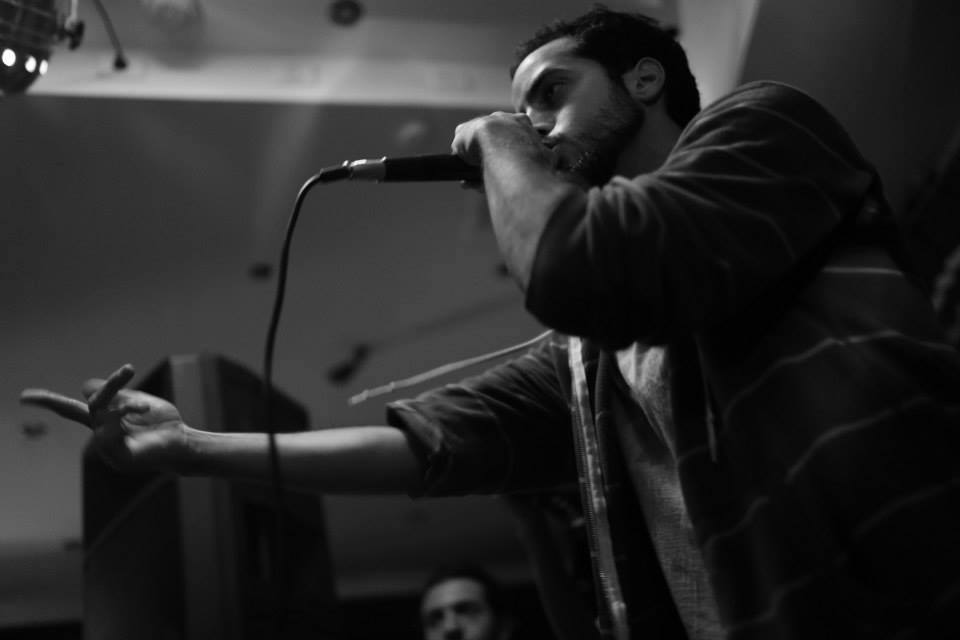
Ramallah Underground have been considered the founders of Palestinian hip-hop.

Ramallah Underground, based in Ramallah, Palestine, was a musical collective born from the desire to give voice to a generation of Palestinians and Arabs, in a situation of great economic, artistic, and political difficulty. The collective was founded by artists Stormtrap and Boikutt, later joined by Aswatt, who aim to rejuvenate Arabic culture by creating "music that Arabic youth can relate to," in the words of Boikutt. They rapped in Arabic, and were credited as some of the founders of Palestinian hip-hop. Their music combines hip-hop, trip hop, and downtempo, besides more traditional Middle-Eastern music. Their MySpace page led David Harrington of the Kronos Quartet to ask them to collaborate on a piece, "Tashweesh," composed by Boikutt, which was included on the quartet's 2009 release Floodplain.

==== Uganda ====
In 2003 Geoffrey Ekongot, Saba Saba aka Krazy Native, of the Bataka Squad, Francis Agaba, the late Paul Mwandha of Musicuganda.com, and Xenson formed the Uganda Hip Hop Foundation. In 2003, the Foundation hosted the first Ugandan Hip Hop Summit and concert at Club Sabrina's in Kampala. It was so successful that they have hosted it every year for the past four years. In 2005 the Bavubuka All Starz was formed under the leadership of Silas aka Babaluku of the Bataka Squad, with the mission of bringing hip-hop music and community together to address social causes. Keko is currently one of the most promising and talented rappers in Uganda. Of late Uganda has produced globally recognized MCs like Bana Mutibwa whose commonly known as Burney MC.

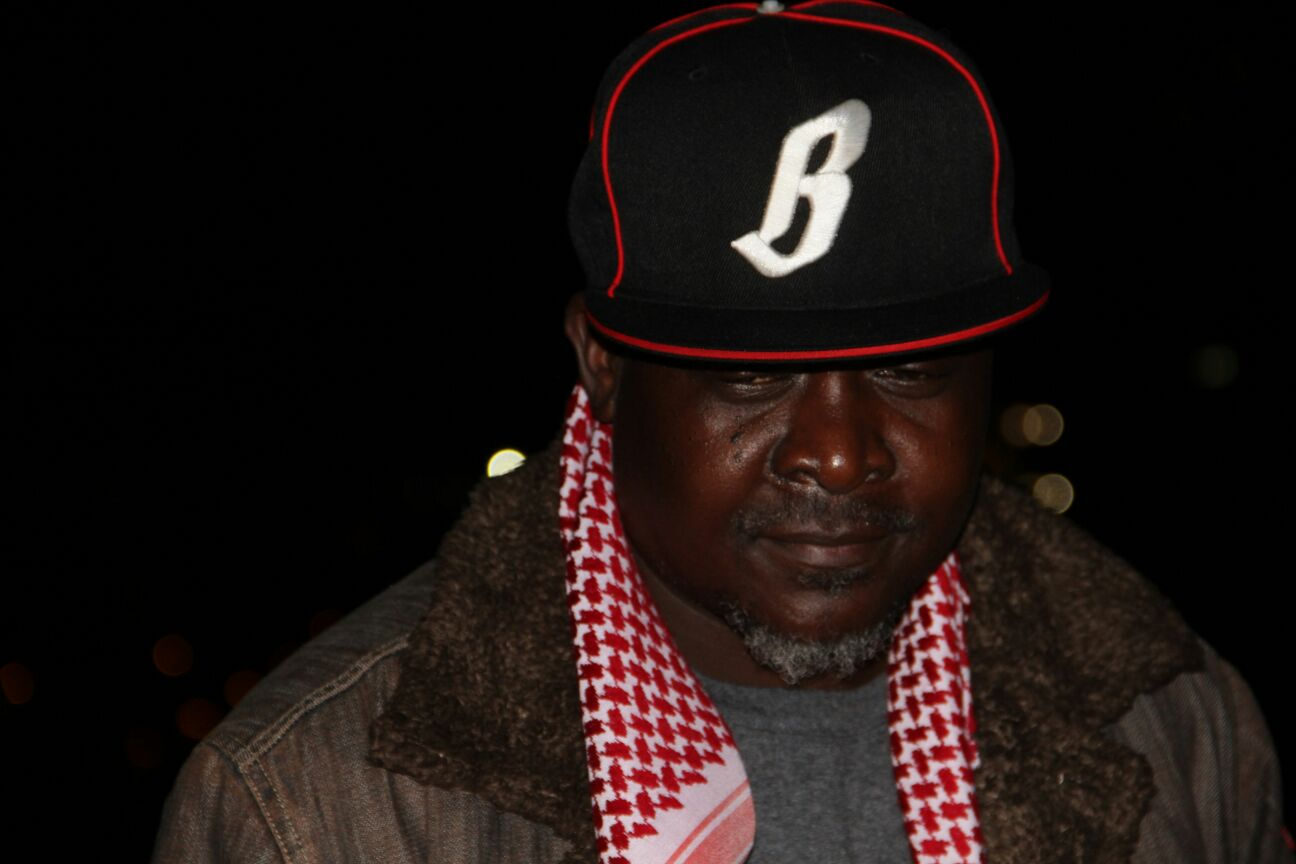
Black Muntu is an urban rap group with a massive following across Zambia.

==== Zambia ====
The first hip-hop album to be released in Zambia was actually a gospel hip-hop album called Talk About God by a duo called MT God Bless which was released on cassette tape in 2003. (Mandiva Syananzu & Tommy Banda were the two rappers). It got massive airplay both locally and internationally. MT God Bless were also the first Christian hip-hop dual to have their music video played on South Africa's Channel O. Pictures of the cassette tape can be seen on Mandiva's Facebook page with the year 2003 inscribed on it. In 2005 C.R.I$..I$. Mr Swagger released what is considered the biggest debut release by a hip-hop artist in Zambia titled "Officer in Charge". Other notable artists to come up over the years are Black Muntu, The Holstar, Conscious, Takondwa, Pitch Black, Diamond Chain, 5ive 4our, Zone Fam, C.Q Krytic, Slap Dee, Macky 2, Mic Diggy and Urban Chaos.

== See also ==
- 1980s in music
- 1990s in music
- 2000s in the music industry
- 2000s
- 2010s in music
