= Michelle Branch discography =

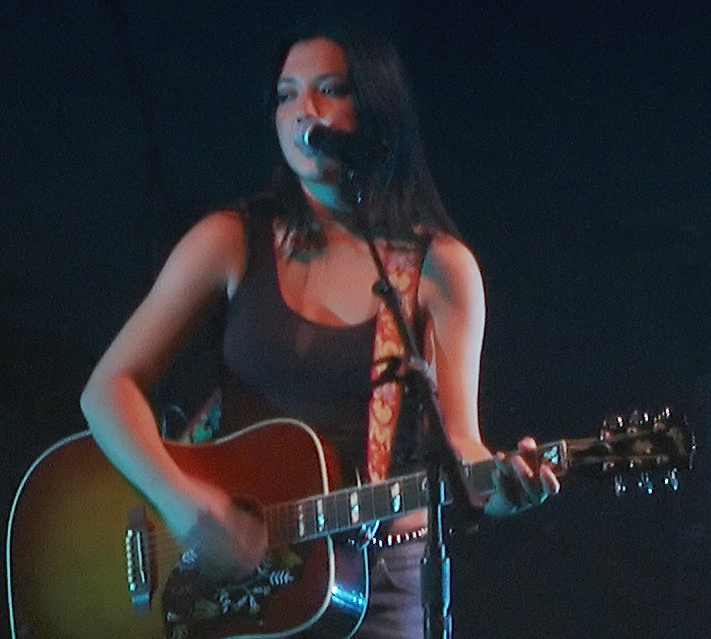
- Branch performing in Toronto in 2003
- Studio albums: 5
- Extended plays: 2
- Singles: 14
- Video albums: 1
- Music videos: 17

American singer-songwriter Michelle Branch has released five studio albums, one video album, two extended plays, and fourteen singles (including two as a featured artist). She released her debut album, Broken Bracelet, through the independent label imprint Twin Dragon Records in 2000 before signing a recording contract with Maverick Records the following year. In August 2001, Branch released her second studio album and major-label debut, The Spirit Room. It peaked at number twenty-eight on the Billboard 200 and featured three Top 40 singles on the Billboard Hot 100, including the top 10 hit "All You Wanted" and her debut single, "Everywhere", which entered the top 20 of multiple international record charts. The album has been certified 2× Platinum by the Recording Industry Association of America (RIAA) for selling over two million copies in the United States. Branch has sold 3 million certified copies of her albums in the United States.

Branch's third album, Hotel Paper, was released June 21, 2003. The album was a commercial success, peaking at number two on the Billboard 200 and spawned two charting singles: "Are You Happy Now?", which peaked at number sixteen on the Billboard Hot 100, and "Breathe", which peaked at number thirty-six. The album has been certified Platinum by the RIAA for selling over one million copies. From 2005 through 2007, Branch recorded with fellow musician Jessica Harp as the country duo The Wreckers. Branch's solo career resumed in 2009 with the release of her country single "Sooner or Later" and the extended play, Everything Comes and Goes.

Following a series of creative disputes and label disruptions that resulted in Everything Comes and Goes being reduced from a full-length album to an extended play and her subsequent album, West Coast Time, going unreleased, Branch released "Loud Music" from the extended play of the same name in 2011 through Reprise Records. In 2015, Branch signed a new record deal with Verve Records and in 2017, she released her fourth album and first for that label, Hopeless Romantic.

== Studio albums ==
Title	Album details	Peak chart positions										Sales	Certifications
Title	Album details	US	AUS	CAN	FRA	GER	IRE	JPN	NZ	SWI	UK	Sales	Certifications
Broken Bracelet	Released: June 1, 2000; Label: Twin Dragon; Formats: CD, digital download, streaming	—	—	—	—	—	—	—	—	—	—		
The Spirit Room	Released: August 14, 2001; Label: Maverick; Formats: CD, LP, cassette, digital download, streaming	28	25	—	120	75	49	12	33	45	54	WW: 3,000,000; US: 2,000,000	RIAA: 2× Platinum; ARIA: Gold; BPI: Silver; MC: Gold; RIAJ: Platinum
Hotel Paper	Released: June 21, 2003; Label: Maverick; Formats: CD, LP, cassette, digital download, streaming	2	18	4	79	43	53	8	4	34	35	US: 1,116,000	RIAA: Platinum; ARIA: Gold; MC: Gold; RIAJ: Gold
Hopeless Romantic	Released: April 7, 2017; Label: Verve; Formats: CD, LP, digital download, streaming	143	—	—	—	—	—	—	—	—	—	US: 5,000	
The Trouble with Fever	Released: September 16, 2022; Label: Nonesuch Records; Formats: CD, LP, digital download, streaming	— (Note: The Trouble with Fever did not enter the Billboard 200 but peaked at number 61 on the Top Album Sales.)	—	—	—	—	—	—	—	—	— (Note: The Trouble with Fever did not enter the UK Albums Chart but peaked at number 96 on the UK Album Downloads Chart.)		
"—" denotes releases that did not chart or were not released in that country

=== Reissues ===
Title	Album details
The Spirit Room: 20th Anniversary Edition	Released: October 15, 2021; Label: Maverick; Formats: LP, digital download, streaming

== Extended plays ==
Title	EP details	Peak positions	
Title	EP details	US Country	US Current
Everything Comes and Goes	Released: July 16, 2010; Label: Reprise; Formats: CD, digital download	35	194
The Loud Music Hits EP	Released: August 26, 2011; Label: Reprise; Formats: Digital download	—	—
Everywhere and Back Again	To be released: March 12, 2027; Label: BMG; Formats: Streaming	TBA	
"—" denotes releases that did not chart or were not released in that country

== Singles ==
=== As lead artist ===
Year	Single	Peak chart positions										Certifications	Album
Year	Single	US	US Adult	AUS	FRA	GER	JPN	NL	NZ	SWI	UK	Certifications	Album
2001	"Everywhere"	12	9	19	60	90	—	28	2	46	18	RMNZ: Gold	The Spirit Room
2002	"All You Wanted"	6	4	25	—	91	—	84	3	—	33		The Spirit Room
2002	"Goodbye to You"	21	15	—	—	—	—	79	32	—	—		The Spirit Room
2003	"Are You Happy Now?"	16	3	33	81	—	—	—	16	—	31		Hotel Paper
2003	"Breathe"	36	13	46	—	—	—	—	—	—	—		Hotel Paper
2004	"'Til I Get Over You"	—	—	—	—	—	—	—	—	—	—		Hotel Paper
2009	"Sooner or Later"	93	35	—	—	—	—	—	—	—	—		Everything Comes and Goes
2010	"Getaway" (featuring Timbaland)	—	—	—	—	—	—	—	—	—	—		Non-album single
2011	"Loud Music"	—	19	—	—	—	87	—	—	—	—		The Loud Music Hits EP
2017	"Hopeless Romantic"	—	—	—	—	—	—	—	—	—	—		Hopeless Romantic
2022	"I'm a Man"	—	—	—	—	—	—	—	—	—	—		The Trouble with Fever
2022	"Not My Lover"	—	—	—	—	—	—	—	—	—	—		The Trouble with Fever
2026	"The Game of Love" (with New Radicals)	—	23	—	—	—	—	—	—	—	—		Everywhere and Back Again
2026	"Goodbye to You" (with Maren Morris)	—	—	—	—	—	—	—	—	—	—		Everywhere and Back Again
"—" denotes releases that did not chart or were not released in that country

=== As featured artist ===
Year	Single	Other artist(s)	Peak chart positions										Certifications	Album
Year	Single	Other artist(s)	US	US AC	US Adult	AUS	GER	IRE	NL	NZ	SWI	UK	Certifications	Album
2002	"The Game of Love"	Santana	5	1	1	21	46	19	40	7	20	16	RMNZ: Gold	Shaman
2005	"I'm Feeling You"	Santana (featuring The Wreckers)	55	5	6	—	—	—	—	—	—	—		All That I Am
"—" denotes releases that did not chart or were not released in that country

== Other contributions ==
Year	Song	Other artist(s)	Album
2002	"Without You"	Justincase	Justincase
2003	"Strange"	—N/a	Remembering Patsy Cline
2005	"Life on Mars?"	—N/a	Gap Favorite Songs
2008	"Together"	—N/a	The Sisterhood of the Traveling Pants 2: Music from the Motion Picture
2009	"I Lose My Heart"	Chris Isaak	Mr. Lucky
2009	"A Case of You"	—N/a	Covered, A Revolution in Sound
2013	"Good Love"	Rihwa	Borderless
2013	"Long Goodbye"	Dwight Yoakam	21st Century Hits: Best of 2000–2012
2017	"A Horse with No Name"	Patrick Carney	BoJack Horseman: Music from the Netflix Original Series
2019	"Woke With You"	*repeat repeat	Glazed
2020	"Doesn't It Feel Good"	Lisa Loeb	A Simple Trick to Happiness
2022	"White Rabbit"	Trixie Mattel	The Blonde & Pink Albums

== Videos ==
=== Video albums ===
Title	Video details
The Video Anthology	Released: August 31, 2009; Label: Reprise; Formats: DVD

=== Music videos ===
Year	Title	Director
2001	"Everywhere" (version 1)	Nick Spanos
2001	"Everywhere" (version 2)	Liz Friedlander
2002	"All You Wanted"	Liz Friedlander
2002	"Goodbye to You"	Francis Lawrence
2002	"The Game of Love"	Paul Fedor
2003	"Are You Happy Now?"	Meiert Avis
2003	"Breathe"	Marc Klasfeld
2005	"I'm Feeling You"	The Malloys
2009	"This Way"	Raphael Mazzucco
2009	"Sooner or Later"	Liz Friedlander
2010	"Getaway"	Thom Bryant
2011	"Loud Music"	Travis Kopach
2011	"Another Sun" (Terra Nova promo)	Matt Fife
2017	"Hopeless Romantic"	Brian Higbee
2017	"Best You Ever"	N/A
2022	"I'm a Man"	Various
2023	"Not My Lover"	Alexa Stone and Stephen Kinigopoulos
2026	"The Game of Love" (with New Radicals)	Stephen Kinigopoulos and Alexa Stone
2026	"Goodbye to You" (with Maren Morris)	Jason Lester
