= Hopeless Romantic =

Hopeless Romantic may refer to:

- Hopeless Romantic (The Bouncing Souls album), a 1999 album
- Hopeless Romantic (Michelle Branch album), a 2017 album
  - "Hopeless Romantic" (Michelle Branch song), the title song
- "Hopeless Romantic", a song by Meghan Trainor from her 2016 album Thank You
- "Hopeless Romantic", a song by Sam Fischer
- "Hopeless Romantic" (Wiz Khalifa song), a 2018 song
- Hopeless Romantics, a 2005 album by Michael Feinstein

== See also ==
- “Call Me Hopeless, Not Romantic”, a song on Mayday Parade's eponymous 2011 album
- Para sa Hopeless Romantic, a 2015 Philippine teen romance film
