= Bad Side =

Bad Side may refer to:

- "Bad Side", a song by Michelle Branch from the album Hopeless Romantic
- Bad Side...LIVE!, radio talk show
