= Working Men's College =

Adult education institution

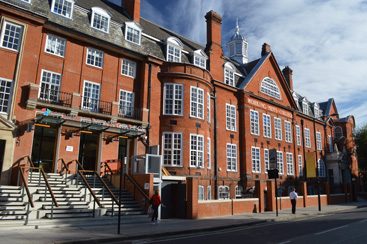
- Motto: Auspicium Melioris Aevi
- Type: Specialist college of adult education
- Established: 1854
- Principal: Dipa Ganguli OBE
- Administrative staff: 125
- Students: 4,100 (2018)
- Location: Camden Town, London, England; 51°32′07″N 00°08′10″W
- Website: www.wmcollege.ac.uk

The Working Men's College (also known as the St Pancras Working Men's College, WMC, The Camden College or WM College), is among the earliest adult education institutions established in the United Kingdom, and Europe's oldest extant centre for adult education. Founded by Christian socialists, at its inception it was at the forefront of liberal education philosophy. Today the college has two centres in the London Borough of Camden.

== History and background ==
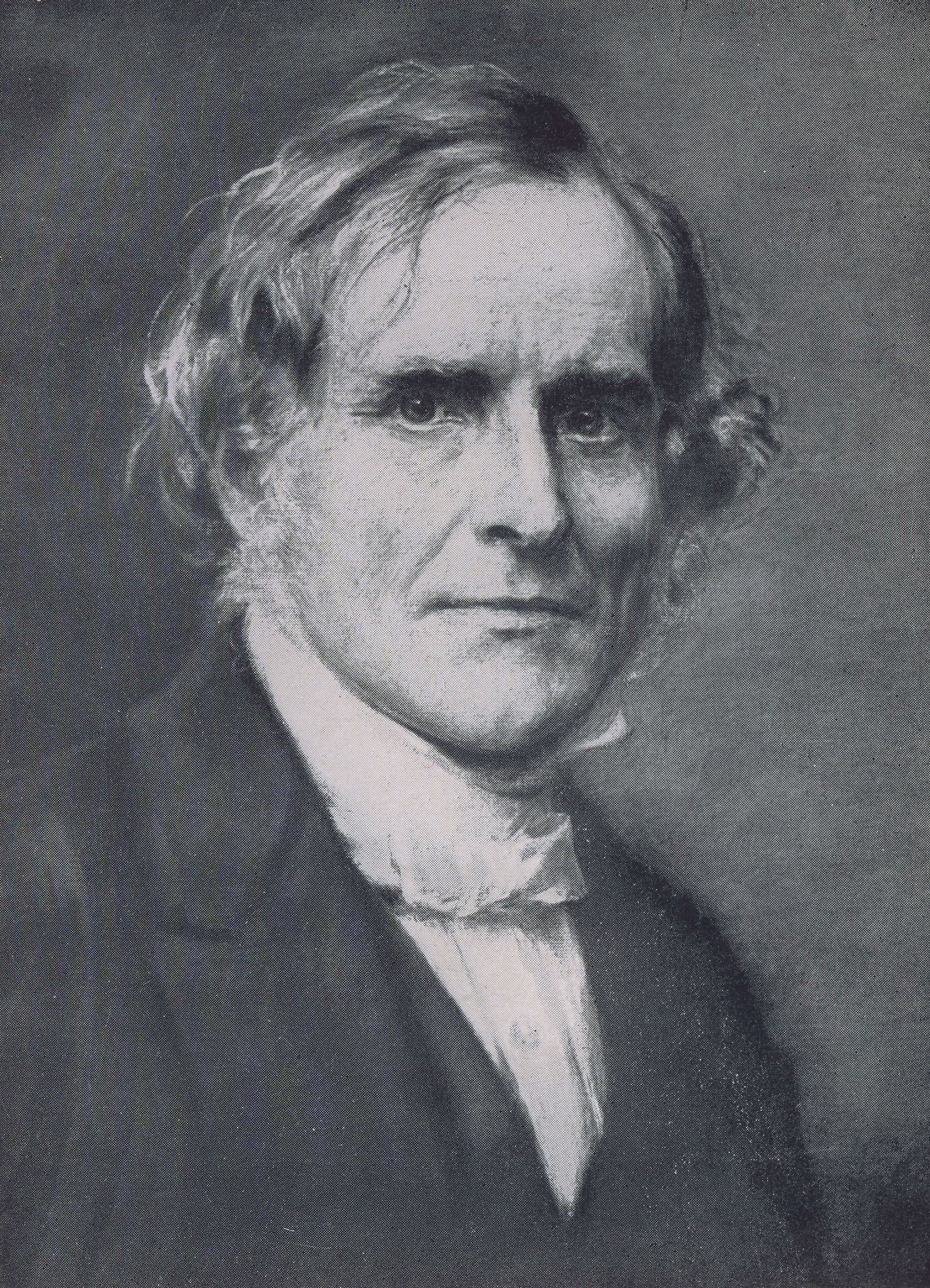
F. D. Maurice, founder of the Working Men's College

Founded in 1854 the college was established in Oakley Square by Christian Socialists to provide for Victorian skilled artisans a liberal education, with its ethical focus countering what its founders saw as failings and corruption in the practices of trade self-help associations of the time. The founding of the college was also a response to concerns about the revolutionary potential of the Chartist Movement.

The college's founders – a view reached in 1904 – were Frederick Denison Maurice, (the first principal), Thomas Hughes (author of Tom Brown's Schooldays), John Malcolm Forbes Ludlow, Frederick James Furnivall, Lowes Cato Dickinson, John Westlake, Richard Buckley Litchfield and John Llewelyn Davies. Notable early promoters and supporters of the college and its foundation were Edward Vansittart Neale, Dante Gabriel Rossetti, John Ruskin, Charles Blachford Mansfield, John Stuart Mill, James Clerk Maxwell, and Charles Kingsley (author of The Water-Babies), while later ones included G.M. Trevelyan, E. M. Forster, C.E.M. Joad and Seamus Heaney.

In the 1870s the new college failed to take up an offer to merge with the Working Women's College which had been founded by Elizabeth Malleson. Malleson decided to make her college co-educational and this caused a dispute amongst her organisation. As a result, F. D. Maurice with Frances Martin helped to set up the College for Working Women in Fitzroy Street in 1874. The minority who supported this college included George and Amelia Tansley, Llewellyn Davies, and Sir John Lubbock. The college was called the Frances Martin College in 1922 after Frances Martin left it a bequest of £500 in her will. This sister college, through financial and organisational difficulties, eventually ran its courses for women at The Working Men's College, and later this in name only as it, and its associated charity, had become unviable. The college's charitable funds were absorbed into those of The Working Men's College, and The Frances Martin College ceased to exist after 90 years in 1967. Around this time, in 1965, The Working Men's College admitted female students for the first time.

The decision to admit women was an expression of what was seen by the college as its unique and progressive historic feature: educational and financial management through a democratically elected Council of teachers and students. Teachers, (who were unpaid volunteer professionals in their field,) and students were both considered as, and called, Members of College as a mark of equality and respect. This educational and management tradition, seen as being in the spirit of a liberal education that promotes values and responsible civic behaviour, and being a direct link to the founders' concern over the failure of Associationism, lasted until the mid-1990s. Sir Wilfred Griffin Eady, principal of the college from 1949 to 1955, defined Liberal Education, the raison d'etre of the college, as "something you can enjoy for its own sake, something which is a personal possession and an inward enrichment, and something which teaches a sense of values".

During the 1970s the college introduced and increased a number of certificated courses, and by the beginning of the 1980s there were successful moves to change the voluntary tradition by remunerating teachers. This led to a drain on the financial reserves of the college. Where previously it supported itself mostly from interest on donations as investments, by the late 1980s it felt obliged to seek government financial aid.

In 1996–97, the governance of the college was changed. Before the change, two bodies regulated college under Articles of Association and a Scheme of Management: a College Council of 12 teachers and 12 students elected by members of college, and a College Corporation of 16 members self-appointed. Council directed education and finance policy through its committees, and elected college officers: the Principal, Vice Principal, Dean of Studies, Bursar and Librarian. Corporation managed college charitable trust funds and provided for asset maintenance and part-finance for courses; it was composed largely of lawyers, bankers and businessmen thought capable of managing and extending charitable funding from the private sector. Both bodies and their officers were voluntary. Before 1996, an administrative staff of Warden, Deputy Warden, Financial Controller, and College Secretary ran the college day-to-day, managing a small number of part-time reception and maintenance staff. After legal advice, and representations to the Charity Commission, Corporation introduced a new Scheme of Management that dissolved Council, and created a self-appointed governing Board of 21 members to decide policy and oversee what became an enlarged paid management. Forceful argument on the change was made on both sides. Seeing Liberal Education's civic values and democratic control as being relevant was a view opposed by one that saw a more management-based method being needed for financial and educational viability.

== College building and use ==
=== 1904–2000 ===
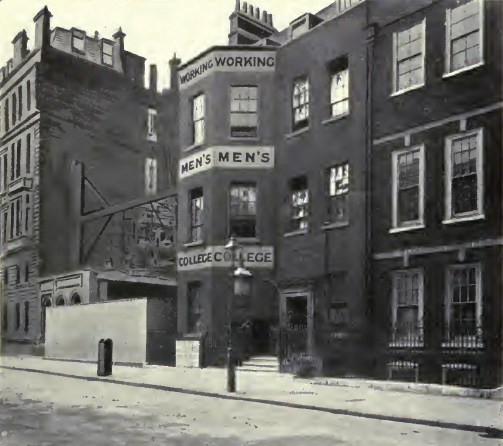
The Working Men's College pre 1904 – Great Ormond Street, London

The college opened at 31 Red Lion Square, later moving to Great Ormond Street in 1857, both in Central London. In 1905 it located to its new Crowndale Road building in the borough of St Pancras, London, now part of The London Borough of Camden. This new home had been designed by W. D. Caroe. Since 1964 the building has been Grade II listed.

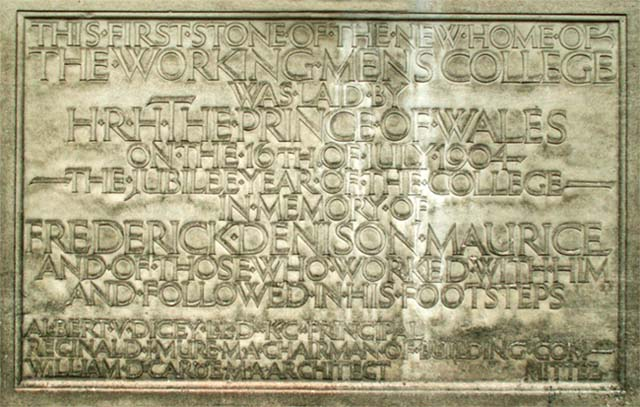

The Working Men's College foundation stone inscription reads:

This first stone of the new home of The Working Men’s College was laid by H.R.H. The Prince of Wales on 16th July 1904 The Jubilee Year of the College. In memory of Frederick Denison Maurice and of those who worked with him and followed in his footsteps. Albert V. Dicey KC Principal / Reginald J. Mure M.A. Chairman of Building Committee / William D. Caroe M.A. Architect.

The Prince of Wales mentioned later became George V of the United Kingdom.

The idea of a new purpose-built College had been expressed in the late 1880s. By the 1890s, the demand for more space through increased student numbers, and competition from other institutions such as Evening Continuation Schools and early Polytechnics, created a need for greater accommodation, and a desire for facilities such as a museum, gymnasium and chemistry laboratory. The college developed a new building at Crowndale Road on a site purchased from Lord Camden; begun in July 1904, and partly occupied in 1905, it was formally opened by Sir William Anson in January 1906.

The physical structure of the building at Crowndale Road was designed to reflect that found within university colleges. Large common spaces, Library, Common Room, Hall, Museum, and later The Charles Wright Common Room, promoted social and intellectual interaction between student, teacher and staff Members of college. There was no separate staff room. Specialist rooms such as science laboratories art and craft studios, lecture theatre, and a gymnasium were added in the 1930s, reflecting a desire to provide a broad educational experience.

Principal in providing this experience was The Common Room. During the 20th century this room, with a Servery for refreshment, provided a focus for College Members to meet, read, discuss, prepare for class, eat, and occasionally hold impromptu public debates. It was used as a meeting place for College societies and clubs. Over the years, the college held societies covering activities and subjects such as boxing, cricket, debating, economics, football, geology, singing, chess, draughts, rowing, history, natural history, old students, modern languages, language interpretation, railways, walking, sketching, holidays, Wireless, music, and science. Regular social events were organised by a Common Room Committee. The room was the venue for one of the college's most important functions, The Furnivall Supper, provided by College founder F.J. Furnivall. The supper, a Christmas meal for old people of the district round the college, lasted as an event until the 1980s. Up to the late–1980s, a September Teachers' Supper was held in The Common Room hosted by the Principal; there was a talk from a guest speaker followed by debate.

The Maurice Hall, with its stage and theatrical lighting, was used for College and outside-user social functions: dances, recitals by the college orchestra, conferences, outside speakers, theatrical performance, lectures, general College meetings, and for a yearly Lowes Dickinson Award art Exhibition.

The Museum has changed its use over the years, from schoolroom for private school tenants to art studio. The room features a pastel portrait of Lionel Jacob, (teacher, Vice Principal 1904–10.) It was re-designated in the early 1990s as the William Walker Room (William 'Paddy' Walker, student and Corporation member for 50 years).

The Gymnasium and The Charles Wright Room, were part of a 1936 building extension, through the demolition of two adjacent College-owned houses, funded by endowment funds, an Appeal Fund, and the Board of Education. The Gymnasium was an adjunct to new college playing fields at Canon's Park, Edgware, that were already used for physical training and sports. The introduction of gymnastics followed a "national interest in physical training – stimulated by the efforts of the European dictatorships in this direction". The Charles Wright Room (Charles Wright, b.1855, college benefactor) was added as a second Common Room. Within this 1936 extension were two new science laboratories, one the Ellis Franklin Laboratory, (Ellis Franklin, teacher, Vice Principal 1922–29,) and new flats for the College Secretary and caretaker.

=== Post-2000 ===
College building and use programmes reduced original common space and removed some specialist rooms. The Common Room, which ceased to be such in its original sense, was split, one half to house a Centre for Student Affairs for enrolment and other administration. The rear of the building was restructured, removing the original Servery, adding a new lift, and a cafeteria with new library on two levels. The Charles Wright Common Room became management space. The gymnasium was converted for general use. The old Library remained, being listed; it kept its original purpose, and use as an occasional location for film.

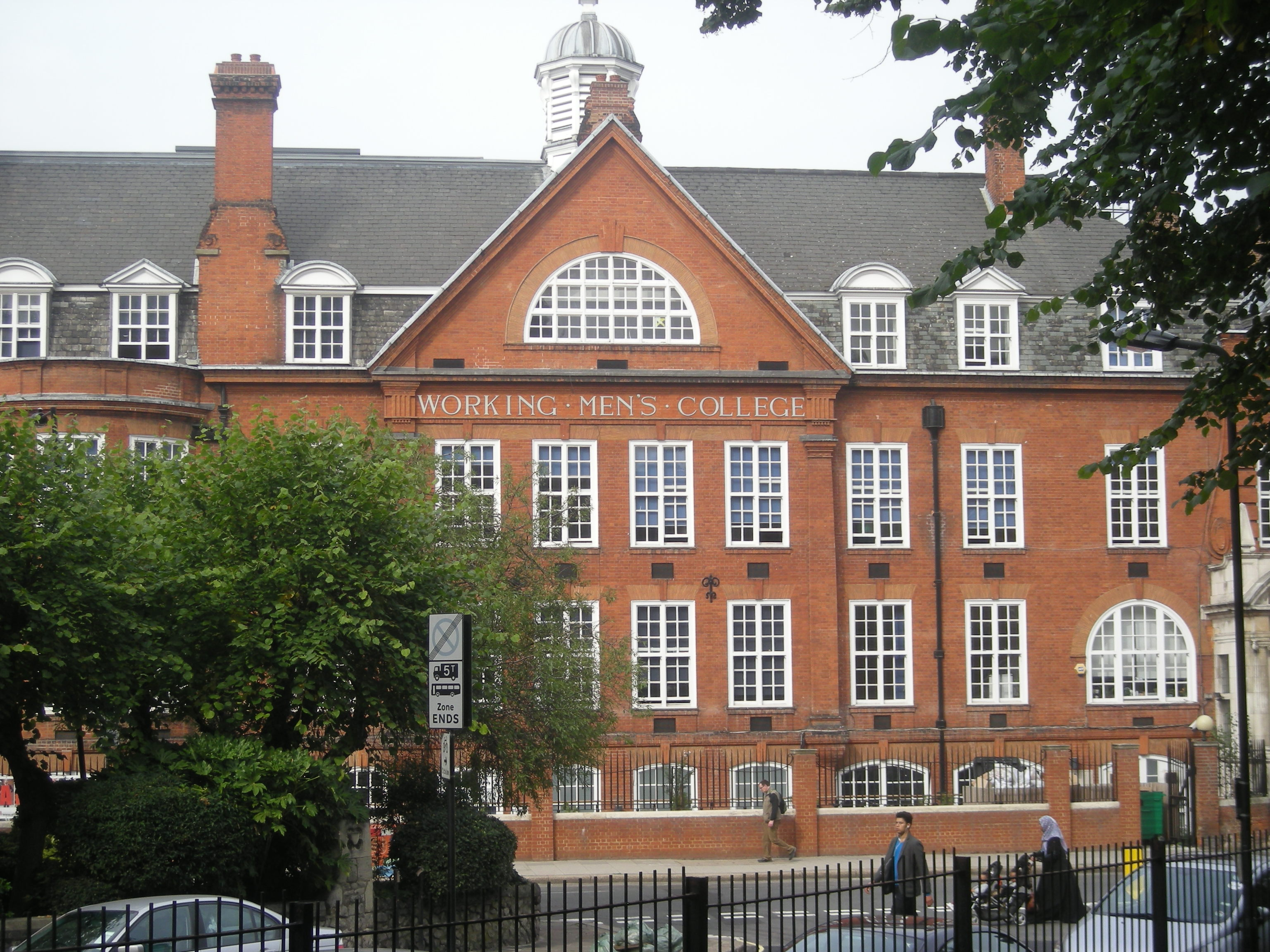
In 2013

== Curriculum ==
The college provides daytime, evening, weekend, short and year-long courses for adults. The curriculum follows national or College-defined programmes in art, applied arts, humanities, languages, computing and basic education.

In 2008, college provision was graded as "good" or "outstanding" by Ofsted, and in 2009 it was awarded Beacon Status. The 2013 inspection rated it "outstanding", the first College in London to be rated as such in the new framework for inspection. By 2018 the college had an Ofsted rating down from outstanding to "Good" overall.

== Notable associates ==
=== Founders ===
- John Llewelyn Davies
- Lowes Cato Dickinson – drawing teacher
- Frederick James Furnivall – English teacher 1854+
- Thomas Hughes QC – Principal 1873–1883
- Richard Buckley Litchfield
- John Malcolm Forbes Ludlow
- F. D. Maurice – Principal 1854–1872
- John Westlake – mathematics teacher 1854+

=== 1854–1904 ===
- George Allen – student
- Sheldon Amos – teacher 1860s
- John Sherren Brewer – teacher 1854+, Vice Principal 1869–1872
- Ford Madox Brown – art teacher 1854+
- John Wharlton Bunney – student
- Arthur Burgess – student
- Edward Burne-Jones – art teacher 1854+
- Samuel Butler – lecturer 1892
- Joseph Henry Collins – student 1860s
- Ebenezer Cooke – student and teacher
- Mordecai Cubitt Cooke - teacher
- Albert Dicey KC – Principal 1899–1912
- John Philipps Emslie – student
- Caradoc Evans – student
- Thomas Charles Farrer – student
- Frank Wallace Galton – student
- Mountstuart Grant Duff GCSI, CIE, PC – teacher
- Lord Haldane KT, OM, PC, KC, FRS, FBA, FSA – lecturer and teacher 1881+
- Frederic Harrison – teacher 1857
- George Holyoake – teacher 1858+
- Thomas Henry Huxley – lecturer 1880s
- John Lubbock – Principal 1883–1899
- Godfrey Lushington KCB, GCMG – teacher, benefactor, Member of Corporation 1858+
- Vernon Lushington QC – teacher 1858+
- William Morris – lectures
- Arthur Munby – Latin teacher
- Alexander Munro – art teacher 1854+
- Sydney Olivier KCMG, CB, PC – Latin teacher 1880s
- Francis Penrose – teacher 1854+
- Frederick Pollock – Member of Corporation 1880s
- Valentine Cameron Prinsep – art teacher 1854+
- Dante Gabriel Rossetti – art teacher 1854–1858
- John Ruskin: art teacher 1854–1858, Member of College Council
- John Robert Seeley – teacher 1860s, Member of Corporation 1880s
- James Fitzjames Stephen – teacher 1855
- Leslie Stephen – lecturer 1854+, Member of Corporation 1880s
- Thomas Sulman – student
- Richard Chenevix Trench – teacher 1860s
- G. M. Trevelyan – teacher
- John Tyndall – lecturer 1880s
- Thomas Woolner – art teacher 1854+
- John Wharlton Bunney – art student and employee of Ruskin 1854 to 1859

=== 1905–1954 ===
- A L Bacharach, who ran the Sunday Chamber Music Society Concerts for 20 years.
- Ralph George Scott Bankes – benefactor and teacher 1923–1948
- Frank Beswick – student
- Wilfred Griffin Eady GCMG, KCB, KBE – Principal 1944–1955
- Ellis Arthur Franklin OBE – Vice Principal, teacher of "electricity"
- Stanley Arthur Franklin – student
- Barnett Freedman CBE – art teacher 1930s
- George Peabody Gooch – teacher and lecturer
- Wilfred Arthur Greene – Principal 1936–1944
- Percy Horton MA, RBA, ARCA – art teacher 1930s
- Ronald Horton ARCA – art teacher 1929–1932
- Albert Houthuesen – art teacher 1930s
- James Laver CBE FRSA – Director of Art Classes 1926–1938
- Charles Prestwood Lucas – KCB KCMG – Principal, 1912–1922
- Frederick Barton Maurice – Principal 1922–1933
- George Orwell – teacher
- Geoffrey Rhoades – art teacher 1930s
- Vaughan Williams – music teacher
- Arnold Wilson KCIE, CSI, CMG DSO – Principal, 1933–1936

=== 1955–2020 ===
- Ronald Forbes Adam – Principal 1956–1961
- John Bowstead – art teacher
- Henry John Byrt QC – Principal 1982–1987
- Edward DuCann – teacher
- Satnam Gill OBE – Principal (current at 2011)
- Lucy de Groot CBE – Vice Chair of Board
- John Michael Hancock Prof. – Chair of Corporation and Board 1987–1999
- Seamus Heaney – teacher
- Timothy Hyman – art history teacher
- Sarah Lucas – student
- Andrew McIntosh – Principal 1988–1997
- Richard Nyman – art teacher
- Albert Alan Owen – Dean of Studies, music teacher
- Jeremy Seabrook – teacher
- Tom Schuller Prof. – Chair of Board 2008
- Ruth Silver DBE – Chair of Board 2002–2005
- Lucius P. Thompson-McCausland – Principal 1969–1979
- Janet Whitaker – Chair of Board 1999–2002

== Vice Principals ==
A principal provided the intellectual driving force and public face of the college. In 1869 F. D. Maurice found his work beyond the college precluded taking as active a role as previously. He recommended an office of Vice Principal to oversee and direct administration. This office was supplemented by others: Dean of Studies, Bursar, and Librarian; all being taken by teachers or students through election. These offices ceased to exist in 1996/97.

- John Sherren Brewer: 1869– 1872
- Richard Buckley Litchfield: 1872–1875
- Charles Crawley: 1883–1887
- Reginald J. Mure: 1888–1896
- Charles Prestwood Lucas: 1897–1903
- Lionel Jacob: 1904–1910
- Arthur S. Lupton: 1911–1921
- Ellis Arthur Franklin: 1922–1929
- G. F. A. Burgess: 1929–1932
- A. D. B. Pearson: 1932–1933
- Charles B. McAlpine: 1933–1936
- Frank Gahan: 1936–1945
- Ronald Morrison: 1945–1948
- Horace H. West: 1948–1952
- H. Michael D. Parker: 1952–1955
- Anthony J. Lincoln: 1955–1960
- Baram Sh. Saklatvala: 1960–1966
- Rudi L. Weisweiller: 1966–1976
- A. George B. Deacon: 1976–1978
- Henry John Byrt: 1978–1982
- Roger Farrington: 1982–1985
- Denis F. Murphy: 1985–1990
- Reginald Wright: 1990–1992
- Shankara Angadi: 1992–1994
- Ian Bell: 1994–1996
