= Spin move (disambiguation) =

A spin move in sports is a horizontal rotation of a player used as a tactical maneuver.

"Spin move" may also refer to:

- Spin (b-boy move), a spinning movement in b-boying (breakdancing)
- Spin Move Records, a recording label in Santa Monica, California, United States
