= Bird's eye view (disambiguation) =

Bird's eye view may refer to:

- Bird's-eye view, a view of an object from above, as though the observer were a bird, often used in the making of blueprints, floor plans and maps
  - Bing Maps#Bird's eye view, the angled photographic views from Microsoft
- Birds Eye View, a platform for emerging women filmmakers founded by Rachel Millward and Pinny Grylls in 2002
- Bird's Eye View (album), an album from singer/songwriter Amy Kuney, released in 2008
- Bird's Eye View, a BBC television series of 1969-1971

== Songs ==
- "Bird's Eye View", by Xzibit from his 1996 debut album At the Speed of Life
- "Bird's Eye View", by Brendan Benson from his 1996 album One Mississippi
- "Bird's Eye View", by Quasi from their 1997 album R&B Transmogrification
- "Bird's Eye View", by Zion I from their 2005 album True & Livin'

== See also ==
- From a Bird's Eye View, 1970-1 British sitcom
