= Thomas Sulman =

English engraver (1834 - 1900)

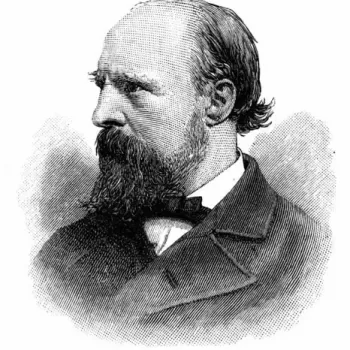
Thomas Sulman

Thomas Sulman (c.1834 – 1900) was an English architectural draftsman.

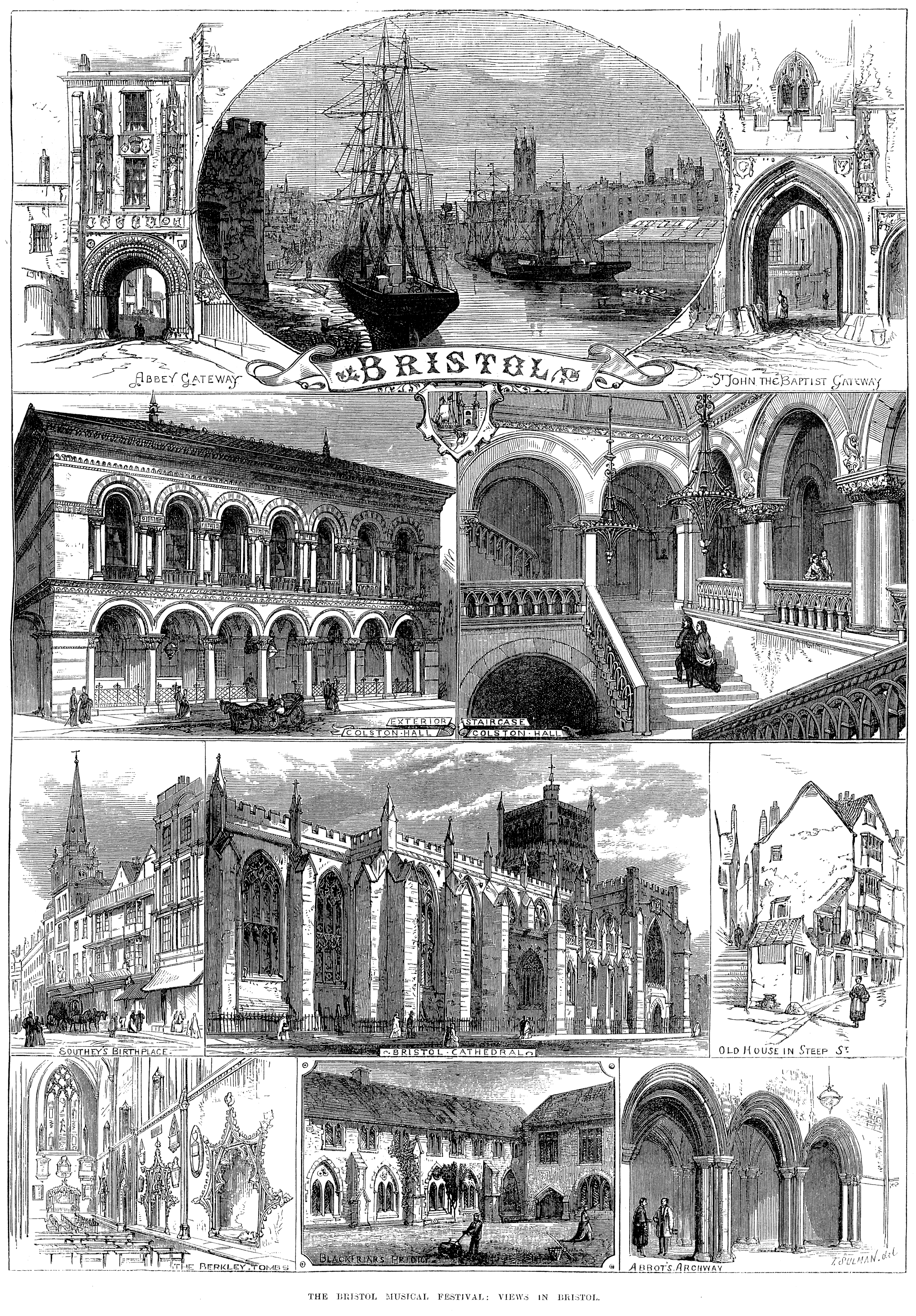
1873 engraving of Views in Bristol by Thomas Sulman

Sulman studied at The Working Men's College between 1854 and 1858, where he was a student of, and later an engraver for, Dante Gabriel Rossetti; he was influenced by the positivist thinkers at the college.

He became a specialist in using balloons to produce birds-eye views of cities including London, Oxford, Glasgow and New York City. These views, as hand-coloured engravings produced with the help of London engraver Robert Loudan Sr., were featured in The Illustrated London News from the 1860s, and were sometimes produced to a fold-out six foot length.

In 1891 he produced high-level views of major London thoroughfares for Herbert Fry's London: Illustrated by Twenty Bird's Eye Views of the Principal Streets engraved by George William Ruffle (1838–1901).

Sulman drew and engraved images for newspaper and magazine advertisements, including one for Beethams Glycerine and Cucumber showing a young woman with toiletries. He illustrated for The Boy’s Own Annual in the 1880s.
