= Battle of Dogger Bank (1915) =

Part of World War I

- Part of the First World War
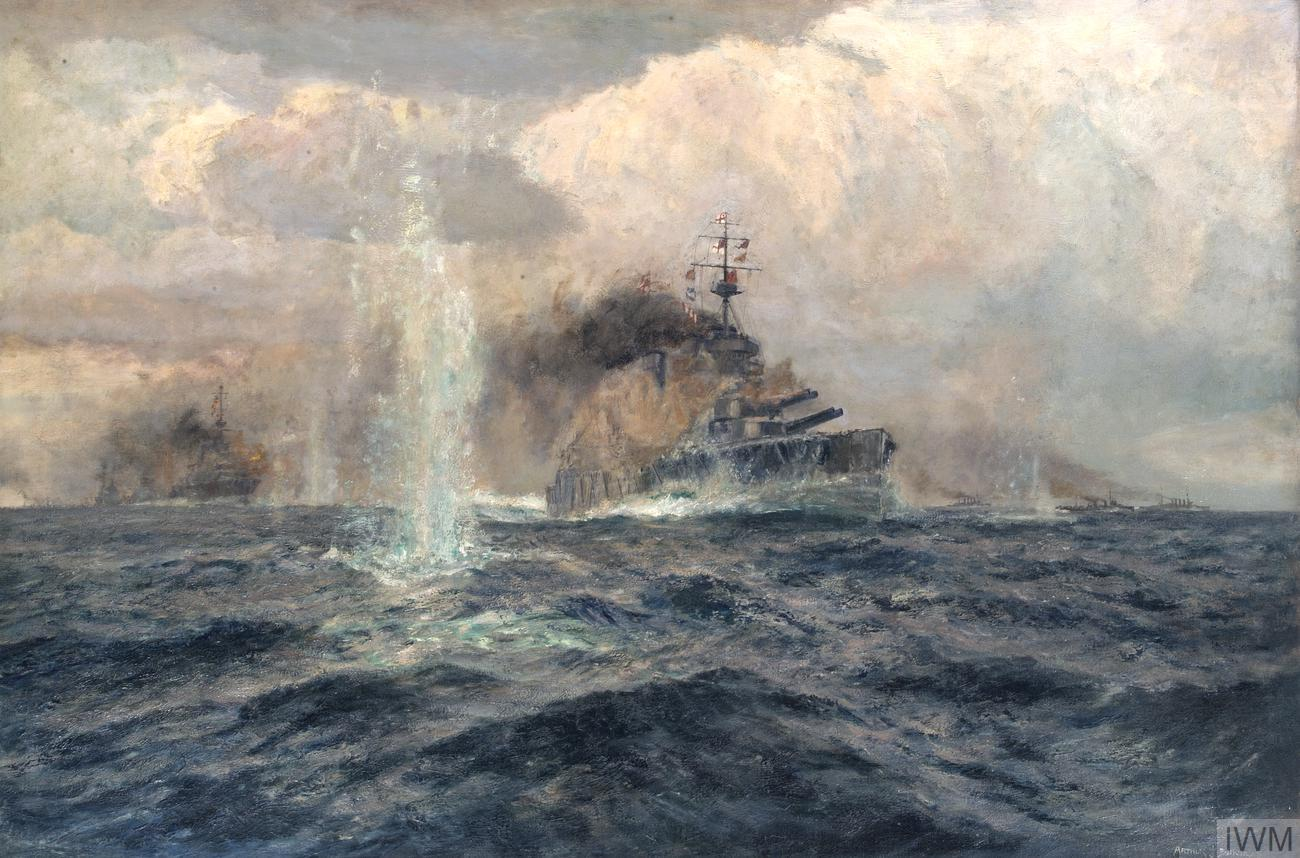
- Battle of Dogger Bank by Arthur Burgess
Date	24 January 1915
Location	Dogger Bank, North Sea 54°33′28″N 05°27′50″E
Result	British victory

Belligerents
United Kingdom	Germany

Commanders and leaders
David Beatty	Franz Hipper

Strength
5 battlecruisers; 7 light cruisers; 35 destroyers	3 battlecruisers; 1 armoured cruiser; 4 light cruisers; 18 torpedo boats; 1 Zeppelin

Casualties and losses
47 killed and wounded; 1 battlecruiser disabled; 1 destroyer disabled	1,034 killed and wounded; 189 captured; 1 armoured cruiser sunk; 2 battlecruisers damaged
- The Battle of Dogger Bank location in the North Sea

The Battle of Dogger Bank (24 January 1915) was a naval engagement during the First World War near the Dogger Bank in the North Sea, between squadrons of the British Grand Fleet and the Kaiserliche Marine (High Seas Fleet). The British had intercepted and decoded German wireless transmissions, gaining advance knowledge that a German raiding squadron was heading for the Dogger Bank. Ships of the Grand Fleet sailed to intercept the raiders.

The British surprised the smaller, slower German squadron, that fled for home. During a stern chase lasting several hours, the British caught up with the Germans and engaged them with long-range gunfire. The British disabled Blücher, the rearmost German ship, and the Germans put the British flagship HMS Lion out of action. Due to inadequate signalling, the remaining British ships stopped the pursuit to sink Blücher; by the time the ship had been sunk, the rest of the German squadron had escaped.

The German squadron returned to harbour with several ships in need of extensive repairs. Lion made it back to port but was out of action for months. The British had lost no ships and suffered few casualties; the Germans had lost Blücher and most of her crew. After the battle, both sides replaced officers who were thought to have shown poor judgement and made changes to equipment and procedures according to the experience gained from the battle.

== Background ==
=== Room 40 ===
Before 1914, international communication was conducted via undersea cables laid along shipping lanes, most of which were under British control. Hours after the British ultimatum to Germany in August 1914, they cut the German cables. German messages could be passed only by Wireless, using cyphers to disguise their content. The Signalbuch der Kaiserlichen Marine (SKM) was captured from the German light cruiser SMS Magdeburg after she ran aground in the Baltic Sea on 26 August 1914. The German–Australian steamer Hobart was seized near Melbourne, Australia, on 11 August, and the Handelsverkehrsbuch (HVB) codebook, used by the German navy to communicate with merchant ships and within the High Seas Fleet, was captured. A copy of the book was sent to England by the fastest steamer, arriving at the end of October. During the Battle off Texel (17 October), the commander of the German destroyer SMS S119 threw overboard his secret papers in a lead-lined chest as the ship sank; but on 30 November, a British trawler dragged up the chest. Room 40 gained a copy of the Verkehrsbuch (VB) codebook, normally used by Flag officers of the Kaiserliche Marine.

The Director of the Intelligence Division of the Admiralty War Staff, Rear-Admiral Henry Oliver, established a code breaking organisation to decipher German signals, using cryptographers from academic backgrounds and making use of the windfalls taken from the German ships. At first, the inexperience of the cryptanalysts in naval matters led to errors in the understanding of the material. This lack of naval experience caused Oliver to make personal decisions about the information to be passed to other departments, many of which, particularly the Operations Division, had reservations about the value of Room 40. The transfer of an experienced naval officer, Commander H. W. W. Hope, remedied most of the deficiencies of the civilians' understanding. When Oliver later became Chief of the Admiralty War Staff he continued to treat Room 40 as a fiefdom and a source for the informal group of officers around the First Lord of the Admiralty, Winston Churchill, that received decoded messages but had insufficient authority to use them to best advantage.

German ships had to report their position every night by wireless and British listening posts along the east coast took cross-bearings on the transmissions to find the positions of the ships. This signals intelligence meant that the British did not need wasteful defensive standing patrols and sweeps of the North Sea but could economise on fuel and use the time for training and maintenance. The Admiralty also uncovered the German order of battle and tracked the deployment of ships, giving them an offensive advantage. The lack of a proper war staff at the Admiralty and poor liaison between Room 40, Oliver and the operations staff meant that the advantage was poorly exploited in 1915; it was not until 1917 that this was remedied. When German ships sailed, information from Room 40 needed to be passed on quickly but Oliver found it hard to delegate and would not routinely supply all decrypts; commanders at sea were supplied only with what the Admiralty thought they needed. Information could reach the Grand Fleet late, incomplete or mistakenly interpreted. When Jellicoe asked for a decryption section to take to sea, he was refused on security grounds.

=== German raid ===
With the German High Seas Fleet (HSF) confined to port after the British success at the Battle of Heligoland Bight in 1914, Admiral Friedrich von Ingenohl, the Commander-in-Chief of the HSF planned a raid on Scarborough, Hartlepool and Whitby on the east coast of England, with the I Scouting Group (Admiral Franz von Hipper), a battlecruiser squadron of three battlecruisers and a large armoured cruiser, supported by light cruisers and destroyers. Hipper opened fire at 08:00 on 16 December 1914, eventually killing 108 and wounding 525 civilians. British public and political opinion was outraged that German warships could sail so close to the British coast, shelling coastal towns with impunity; British naval forces had failed to prevent the attacks and also failed to intercept the raiding squadron. The British fleet had sailed but the German ships escaped in stormy seas and low visibility, assisted by British communication failures. The Germans had made the first successful attack on Britain since the 17th century and suffered no losses. Ingenohl was unjustly blamed for missing an opportunity to inflict a defeat on the Royal Navy, despite creating the chance by his offensive-mindedness.

=== British counter-action ===
The British had let the raid occur and appeared to the public to have been surprised (having been forewarned by decoded wireless messages) and then to have failed to sink the German raiding force on its way back to Germany. In 1921, the official historian Julian Corbett wrote,

Two of the most efficient and powerful British squadrons...knowing approximately what to expect...had failed to bring to action an enemy who was acting in close conformity with our appreciation and with whose advanced screen contact had been established.

The British had escaped a potential disaster caused by the British 1st Battlecruiser Squadron (Vice-Admiral Sir David Beatty) not being supported by the 2nd Battle Squadron (Vice-Admiral Sir George Warrender), when it failed to make contact with the raiding force.

The worst British failure was in the exploitation of the intelligence provided by the code breakers at Room 40 (Sir Alfred Ewing) that had given the British notice of the raid. Some intercepts decoded during the action had taken two hours to reach British commanders at sea, by when they were out of date or misleading. News of the sailing of the HSF was delivered so late that the British commanders thought that the Germans were on the way when they were returning. At sea, Beatty had sent ambiguous signals and some commanders had not used their initiative. On 30 December, the commander of the Grand Fleet, Admiral Sir John Jellicoe, gave orders that when in contact with German ships, officers were to treat orders from those ignorant of local conditions as instructions only but he and Beatty declined to implement Admiralty suggestions to loosen ship formations, for fear of decentralising tactical command too far.

== Plan ==
=== German plan ===
Hipper suspected that the British had received advanced warning about earlier operations of the HSF from spy ships mingling with British and Dutch fishing boats operating near the German Bight and the Dogger Bank, to observe German fleet movements. Hipper considered that with the Dogger Bank mid-way on the short route to the English coast, a signal from a trawler could reach the British in time for the British battlecruisers to intercept a German sortie, certainly on the return journey. Hipper ordered German ships vigorously to enforce search and seizure rules, fishing boats being brought into Cuxhaven to be searched. Buoyed by the success of the raid on the English coast, Admiral Hipper planned an attack on the British fishing fleet on the Dogger Bank. The German fleet had increased in size since the outbreak of war, with the arrival in service of the König-class dreadnought battleships SMS König, Grosser Kurfürst, Markgraf and Kronprinz of the 3rd Battle Squadron and the Derfflinger-class battlecruiser Derfflinger.

Hipper intended to clear the bank of British fishing vessels, dubious neutrals and to attack any small British warships in the area, with the HSF covering the withdrawal of the battlecruisers. The limited nature of the operation conformed to the ban by the Kaiser on operations by the High Seas Fleet, that had been reiterated on 10 January. A slightly more aggressive strategy was permitted, within the policy of keeping the HSF in being, in which the fleet could sortie to attempt to isolate and destroy advanced British forces or to attack the Grand Fleet if in greater strength. On 19 January, Beatty had reconnoitred the area west of the German Bight and been seen by a German aircraft. The reconnaissance and British activity at the Dogger Bank led Ingenohl to order Hipper and the I Scouting Group to survey the area and surprise and destroy any light forces found there. The I Scouting Group contained the battlecruisers Seydlitz (flagship), Moltke, Derfflinger and armoured cruiser Blucher, four light cruisers and eighteen destroyers.

=== British plan ===
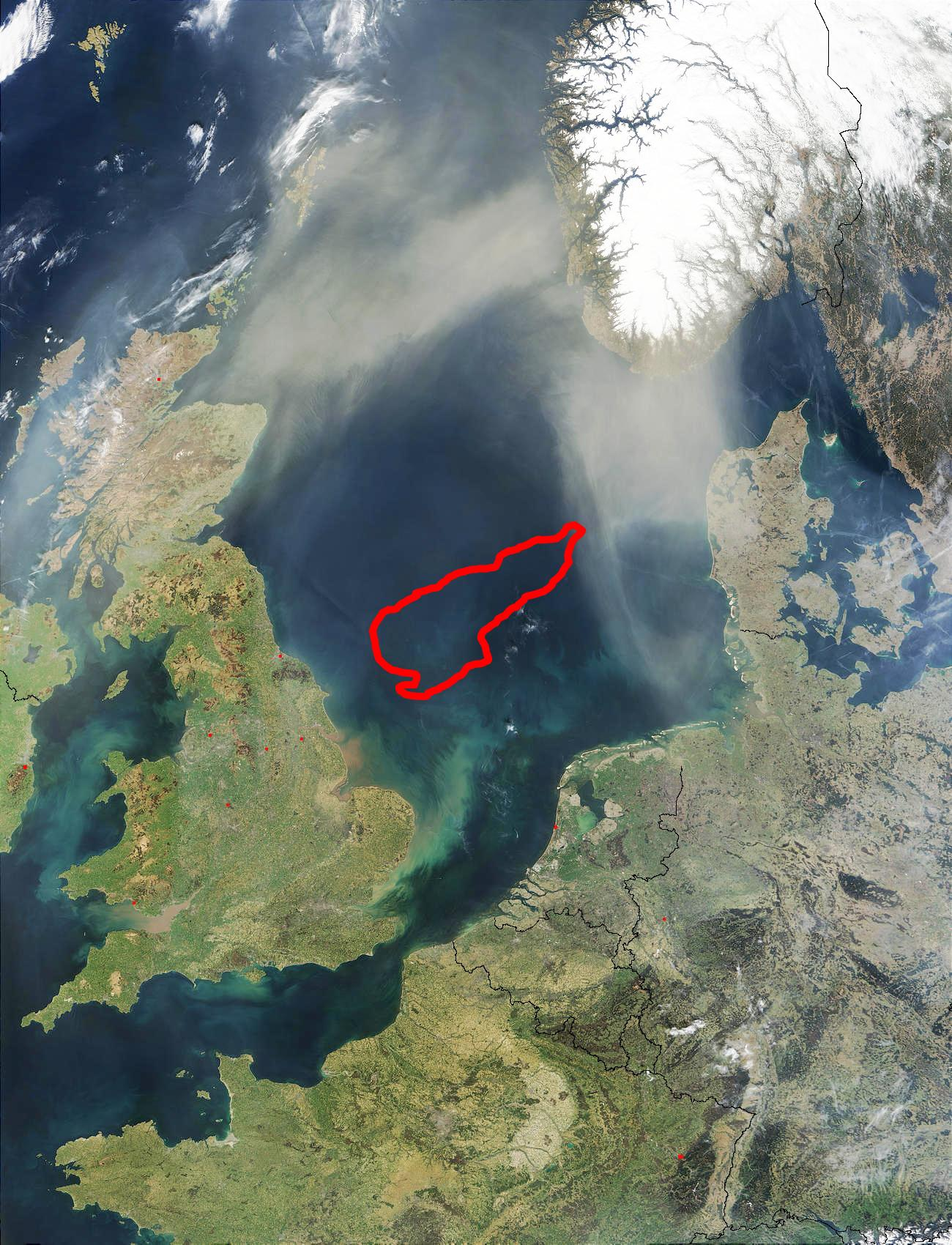
Area of the Dogger Bank

Wireless transmissions from German ships in the Jade Bight on 23 January 1915, intercepted and decoded by Room 40, alerted the British to a German sortie in force as far as the Dogger Bank. At the Admiralty, Wilson, Oliver and Churchill arranged a plan to confront the Germans with a superior opponent. A rendezvous was set for 24 January at 07:00, 30 nmi (56 km; 35 mi) north of the Dogger Bank and about 180 nmi (330 km; 210 mi) west of Heligoland. The battlecruisers comprised the 1st Battlecruiser Squadron (Beatty) with Lion (flagship) Tiger and Princess Royal. The new 2nd Battlecruiser Squadron (Rear-Admiral Gordon Moore deputy to Beatty) had New Zealand as flagship and Indomitable. Harwich Force (Commodore Reginald Tyrwhitt) sailed from Harwich with three light cruisers and 35 destroyers, to rendezvous with the battlecruisers at 07:00 on 24 January.

To cover the East Coast and act as distant support, the 3rd Cruiser Squadron and the seven pre-dreadnoughts of the 3rd Battle Squadron (Admiral Edward Bradford) sailed from Rosyth for an area in the North Sea, from which they could cut off the German force if it moved north. The Grand Fleet left Scapa at 21:00 on 23 January, to sweep the southern North Sea but could not be expected to arrive on the scene until the afternoon of 24 January. Soon after the German force sailed, the 1st Light Cruiser Squadron (Commodore William Goodenough) and the battlecruisers departed Rosyth, heading south; at 07:05 on 24 January, a clear day with good visibility, they encountered German screening vessels at the Dogger Bank.

== Orders of battle ==
=== Royal Navy ===
British fleet
Name	Flag	Class
1st Battlecruiser Squadron
HMS Lion	Royal Navy	Lion-class battlecruiser
HMS Princess Royal	Royal Navy	Lion-class battlecruiser
HMS Tiger	Royal Navy	Battlecruiser
2nd Battlecruiser Squadron
HMS Indomitable	Royal Navy	Invincible-class battlecruiser
HMS New Zealand	Royal Navy	Indefatigable-class battlecruiser
1st Light Cruiser Squadron
HMS Birmingham	Royal Navy	Town-class cruiser
HMS Lowestoft	Royal Navy	Town-class cruiser
HMS Nottingham	Royal Navy	Town-class cruiser
HMS Southampton	Royal Navy	Town-class cruiser
Harwich Force
HMS Arethusa	Royal Navy	Arethusa-class cruiser
HMS Aurora	Royal Navy	Arethusa-class cruiser
HMS Undaunted	Royal Navy	Arethusa-class cruiser
35 destroyers	Royal Navy	—

=== Imperial German Navy ===
German force
Name	Flag	Class
1st Scouting Group
SMS Derfflinger	Imperial German Navy	Derfflinger-class battlecruiser
SMS Moltke	Imperial German Navy	Moltke-class battlecruiser
SMS Seydlitz	Imperial German Navy	Battlecruiser
SMS Blücher	Imperial German Navy	Armoured cruiser
2nd Scouting Group
SMS Kolberg	Imperial German Navy	Kolberg-class cruiser
SMS Rostock	Imperial German Navy	Karlsruhe-class cruiser
SMS Stralsund	Imperial German Navy	Magdeburg-class cruiser
SMS Graudenz	Imperial German Navy	Graudenz-class cruiser
18 torpedo boats	Imperial German Navy	—

== Battle ==
=== 24 January ===
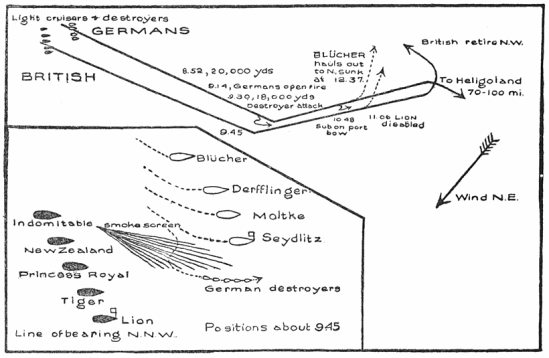
Positions in the battle

Sighting the smoke from a large approaching force, Hipper headed south-east by 07:35 to escape but the battlecruisers were faster than the German squadron, which was held back by the slower armoured cruiser Blücher and the coal-fuelled torpedo boats. By 08:00, the German battlecruisers had been sighted from Lion but the older battlecruisers of the British 2nd Battlecruiser Squadron were lagging behind the 1st Battlecruiser Squadron. Chasing the Germans from a position astern and to starboard, the British ships gradually caught up—some reaching a speed of 27 kn (50 km/h; 31 mph)—and closed to gun range.

Beatty chose to approach from this direction so that the prevailing wind blew the British ships' smoke clear, allowing them a good view of the German ships, while German gunners were partially blinded by their funnel and gun smoke blowing towards the British ships. Lion opened fire at 08:52, at a range of 20,000 yd (11 mi; 18 km) and the other British ships commenced firing as they came within range, while the Germans were unable to reply until 09:11, because of the shorter range of their guns. No warships had engaged at such long ranges or at such high speeds before, and accurate gunnery for both sides was an unprecedented challenge but after a few salvos, British shells straddled Blücher.

The British fire was concentrated on the battlecruiser Seydlitz at the head of the line and Blücher at the rear. With five British ships against four German, Beatty intended that his two rear ships, New Zealand and Indomitable, should engage Blücher, while his leading three engaged their opposite numbers. Captain Henry Pelly of the new battlecruiser Tiger assumed that two ships should concentrate on the leading German ship and engaged Seydlitz, leaving Moltke free to fire at Lion. Tiger's fire was ineffective, as she mistook the shell splashes from Lion for her own, when the fall of shot was 3,000 yd (1.7 mi; 2.7 km) beyond Seydlitz. At 09:43, Seydlitz was hit by a 13.5 in (340 mm) shell from Lion, which penetrated her after turret barbette and caused an ammunition fire in the working chamber. This fire spread rapidly through other compartments, igniting ready propellant charges all the way to the magazines and knocked out both rear turrets with the loss of 165 men. Only the prompt action of a crewmember, Wilhelm Heidkamp, in flooding the magazines saved Seydlitz from a magazine explosion that would have destroyed the ship. (Note: Heidkamp saved the ship when he flooded the magazine by opening the red-hot valves, burning his hands and lungs, injuries from which he never recovered, leading to his early death in 1931. The Kriegsmarine named the destroyer Z21 Wilhelm Heidkamp after him.)

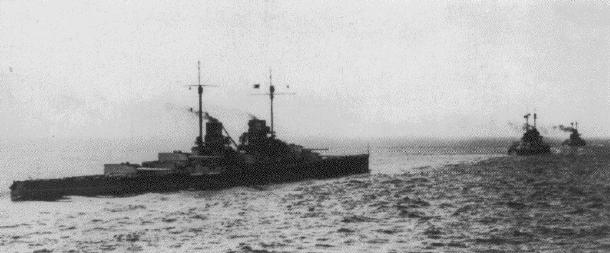
German battlecruisers (L–R) Derfflinger, Moltke and Seydlitz en route to Dogger Bank.

The British ships were relatively unscathed until 10:18, when Derfflinger hit Lion with several 12.0 in (30.5 cm) shells, damaging her engines and causing flooding; Lion lost speed and began to fall behind. At 10:41, Lion narrowly escaped a disaster similar to that on Seydlitz, when a German shell hit the forward turret and ignited a small ammunition fire but it was extinguished before causing a magazine explosion. A few minutes later, taking on water and listing to port, Lion had to stop her port engine and reduce speed to 15 kn (28 km/h; 17 mph) and was soon out of action, having been hit 14 times. At 10:30, Blücher was hit by a shell from Princess Royal, which caused an ammunition fire and boiler room damage. Blücher had to reduce speed to 17 kn (31 km/h; 20 mph) and lagged behind the rest of the German force. Beatty ordered Indomitable—his slowest ship—to intercept Blücher.

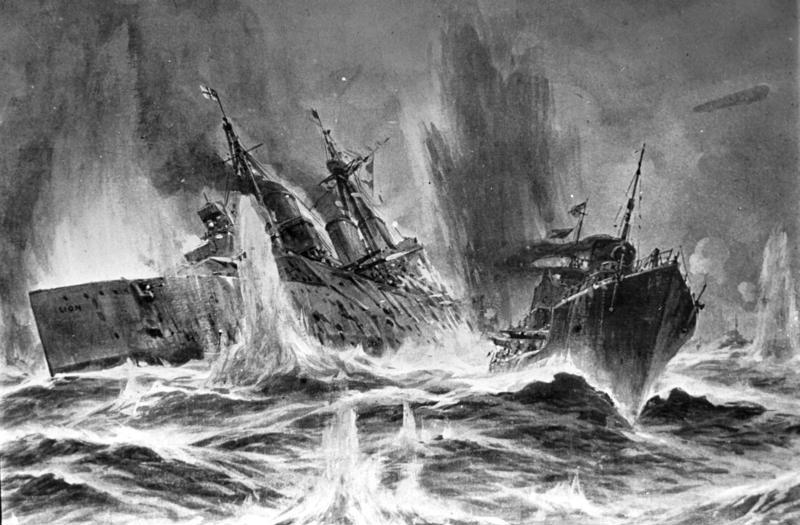
Painting of SMS V5 engaging HMS Lion, by Willy Stöwer

With his ships running short of ammunition, Hipper chose to steam for home, leaving the disabled Blücher behind, to save his remaining ships. The annihilation of the German squadron appeared likely to the British until 10:54, when Beatty—believing he saw a submarine periscope on Lion′s starboard bow—ordered a 90° turn to port, to avoid a submarine ambush (The "periscope" may have been a surfacing, run-out torpedo which had been launched 15 minutes earlier by the German destroyer V5). At 11:02, realising that so sharp a turn would open the range too much, Beatty ordered "Course NE" to limit the turn to 45° and then added "Engage the enemy's rear", to clarify his intent that the other ships, which had now left Lion far behind, should pursue the main German force. With Lion′s electric generators out of action, Beatty could only signal using flag hoists and both signals were flown at the same time.

The combination of the signal "Course NE"—which happened to be the direction of Blücher—and the signal to engage the rear was misunderstood by Beatty's second-in-command, Rear-Admiral Moore on New Zealand, as an order for all the battlecruisers to finish off Blücher. The British battlecruisers broke off the pursuit of the German squadron and attacked Blücher, with most of the British light cruisers and destroyers joining in. Beatty tried to correct this obvious misunderstanding by using the order from Horatio Nelson at the Battle of Trafalgar "Engage the enemy more closely" but this order was not in the signal book and Beatty chose "Keep nearer to the enemy" as the closest equivalent. By the time this signal was hoisted, Moore's ships were too far away to read Beatty's flags and the correction was not received.

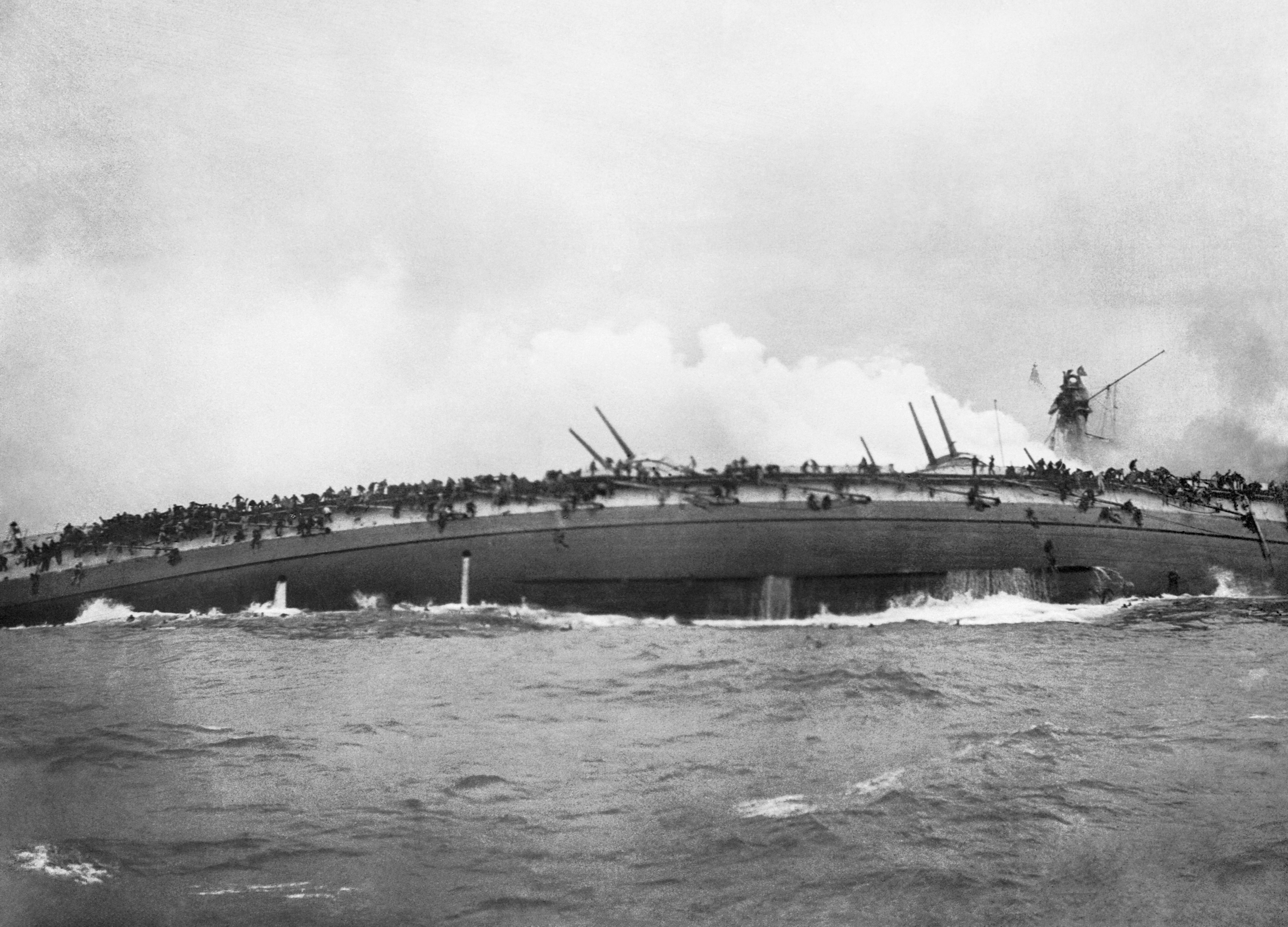
SMS Blücher rolls over onto her side

Despite the overwhelming odds, Blücher put the British destroyer HMS Meteor out of action and scored two hits on the British battlecruisers with her 8.3 in (21 cm) guns. Blücher was hit by about 70 shells and wrecked. When struck by two torpedoes from the light cruiser Arethusa, Blücher capsized at 54°25'N 5°25'E and sank at 13:13, with the loss of 792 crew. British ships began to rescue survivors but they were hindered by the arrival of the Zeppelin L-5 (LZ-28) and a German seaplane which attacked with small bombs. No damage was done but the British ships put on speed and withdrew to avoid further aerial attack, abandoning some of the survivors. By this time, the rest of the German ships were too far away for the British to catch up.

Lion made 10 kn (19 km/h; 12 mph) at the beginning of the 300 nmi (560 km; 350 mi) return voyage, escorted by Indomitable. Beatty contemplated leaving a flotilla of destroyers to guard Lion and sending the rest to the German Bight, to make a night attack on the German ships, but the damage to Lion caused more problems. As she crept home, the ship suffered further engine-trouble from saltwater contamination in the boiler-feed-water system and her speed dropped to 8 kn (15 km/h; 9.2 mph). Lion was taken in tow by Indomitable, an operation which took two hours, in which the battlecruisers were exceedingly vulnerable to submarine attacks. At 17:00, the voyage resumed, the ships working up 10 kn (19 km/h; 12 mph). When the Grand Fleet arrived, Jellicoe increased the screen to thirteen light cruisers and 67 destroyers. A message from the Admiralty arrived that the Germans were planning a night destroyer attack but that the destroyers with the two scouting groups were low on fuel and those with the HSF were too far away.

=== 25 January ===
Lion and Indomitable slowed to 7 kn (13 km/h; 8.1 mph) overnight when Lion had more engine-trouble and at dawn were still 100 nmi (190 km; 120 mi) short of the Firth of Forth. The destroyers reformed into an anti-submarine screen and the ships reached the firth at midnight; the destroyer Meteor was towed into the Humber Estuary. Lion was out of action for four months, Fisher having decreed that the damage be repaired at Armstrong's on the Tyne, without her going into dry dock, making for an extremely difficult and time-consuming job. The surviving German ships reached port; Derfflinger was repaired by 17 February but Seydlitz needed a dry dock and was not ready for sea until 1 April.

== Aftermath ==
=== Analysis ===
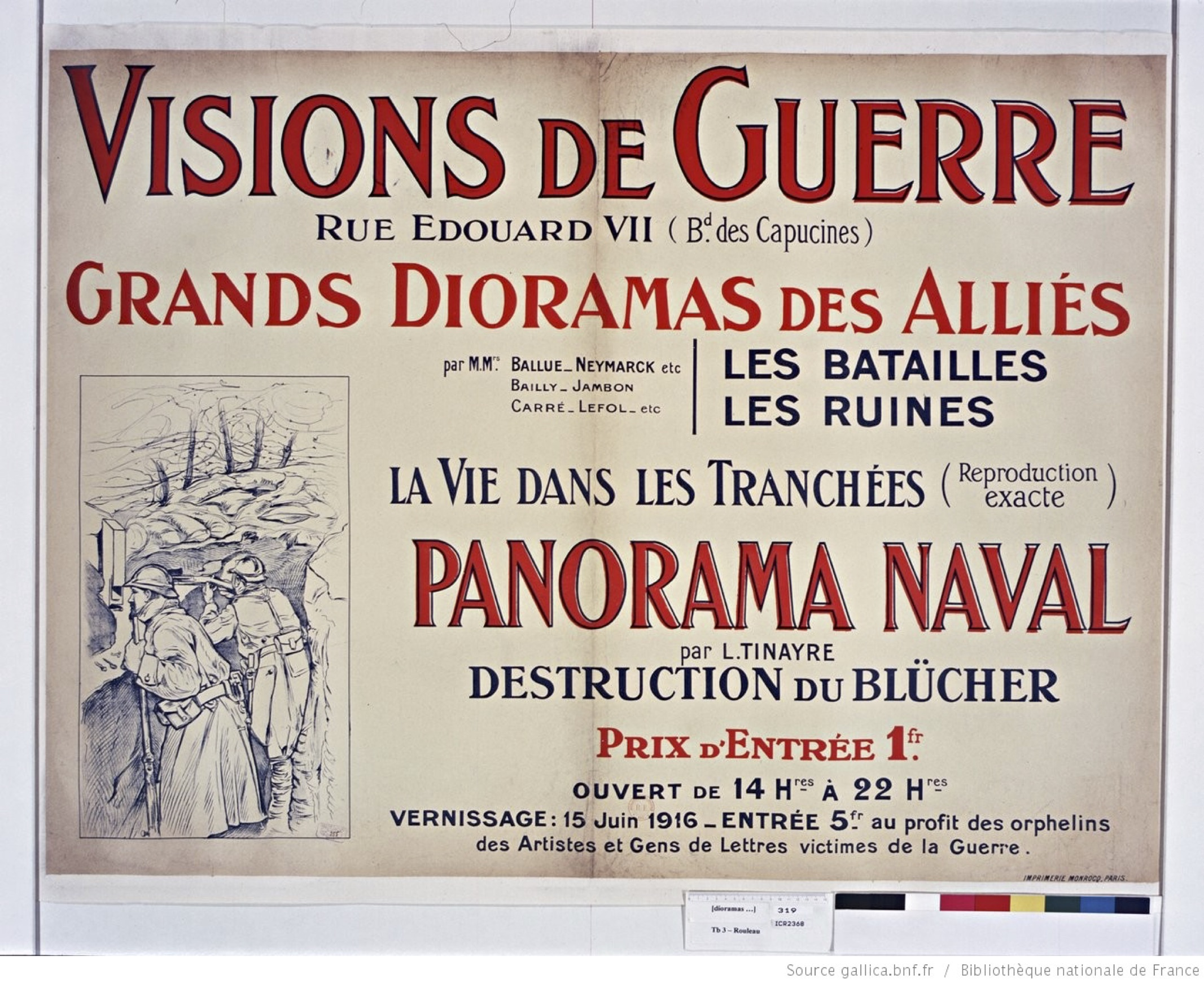
1916 advertisement for a film of Blücher sinking. Proceeds from the premiere showing of the film went to orphans of artists and writers lost to the war.

At first the Germans thought that Tiger had been sunk, because of a large fire that had been seen on her decks but it was soon clear that the battle was a serious German reverse. Kaiser Wilhelm II issued an order that henceforth all risks to surface vessels were to be avoided. Ingenohl was sacked and replaced by Admiral Hugo von Pohl. The damage to Seydlitz revealed flaws in the protection of her magazines and dangerous ammunition-handling practices, some failings were remedied in the HSF before the Battle of Jutland (31 May – 1 June 1916). Another change was an adaptation of the gun mountings in the main turrets. The British had been able to open fire at longer ranges since German guns were limited to a maximum angle of 13.5 degrees elevation by the design of their turrets. By reducing the maximum depression angle from 8 to 5.5 degrees, the maximum elevation angle was increased to 16 degrees and range increased to 20 km (12 mi).

The Germans thought that the appearance of the British squadron at dawn was too remarkable to be a coincidence and concluded that a spy near their base in Jadebusen (Jade Bay) was responsible, not that the British were eavesdropping on their encrypted wireless communications. (In 1920, Scheer wrote that the number of British ships present suggested that they had known about the operation in advance but that this was put down to circumstances, although "other reasons" could not be excluded.)

Beatty had lost control of the battle and he judged that the opportunity of an overwhelming victory had been lost. The Admiralty—erroneously believing that Derfflinger had been badly damaged—later reached the same conclusion. Jutland later showed that the British battlecruisers were still vulnerable to ammunition fires and magazine explosions, if hit by plunging fire. Had Moore's three fast battlecruisers pursued Hipper's remaining three (leaving the slower Indomitable behind as Beatty intended), the British might have been at a disadvantage and been defeated. Blücher demonstrated the ability of the German ships to absorb great punishment; all of the remaining ships were larger, faster, newer, more heavily armed, and far better armoured than Blücher, only Seydlitz had suffered serious damage. Apart from the sinking of Blücher, the Germans out-hit the British by over three to one, with 22 heavy shell hits—16 on Lion and six on Tiger—against seven British hits.

The battle, although inconclusive, boosted British morale. Moore was quietly replaced and sent to the Canary Islands and Captain Henry Pelly of Tiger was blamed for not taking over when Lion was damaged. Ralph Seymour remained Beatty's flag lieutenant, although he was responsible for hoisting Beatty's two commands on one flag hoist, allowing them to be read as one. The use of wireless allowed centralised control of ships from the Admiralty, which cramped the initiative of the men on the spot. Signals between ships continued to be by flag but there was no revision of the signal book or the assumptions of its authors. Signalling aboard Lion was again poor in the first hours of Jutland, with serious consequences for the British. The battlecruisers failed to improve fire distribution and similar targeting errors were made at Jutland.

=== Casualties ===
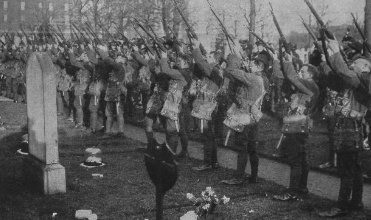
Royal Scots Territorials firing a salute over the grave of Captain Erdmann, Commander of SMS Blücher

In 1929, Julian Corbett, the official naval historian, recorded 792 men killed and 45 wounded out of the 1,026 crew on Blücher, 189 men being rescued by the British. Seydlitz lost 159 men killed and 33 wounded and Kolberg lost three men killed and two wounded. In 1965 Marder wrote that over 1,000 German sailors had been killed or captured, for British casualties of less than 50 men killed or wounded. In 2003, Massie wrote that German casualties were an estimated 951 men killed and 78 wounded, most in Blücher; 153 men were killed and 33 were wounded in the fire in the two after turrets of Seydlitz. The British rescued 189 unwounded prisoners and 45 wounded from Blücher. British casualties were 15 killed and 80 men wounded. On Lion, two men had been killed and eleven wounded, most by a shell hit in the A turret lobby. Ten men were killed on Tiger with nine men wounded and on Meteor, four men were killed and two were wounded.

=== Gunnery records ===
Gunnery records
Ship	Shells fired	Target hits	Hits received	Casualties
Lion	243 × 13.5-in	Blücher 1 Derfflinger 1 Seydlitz 2	16 × 11- and 12-in 1 × 8.2-in	1 killed 20 wounded
Tiger	355 × 13.5-in	Blücher – Derfflinger 1 Seydlitz 2	6 × 11- and 12-in 1 × 8.2-in	10 killed 11 wounded
Princess Royal	271 × 13.5-in	Blücher – Derfflinger 1	0	0
New Zealand	147 × 12-in	Blücher —	0	0
Indomitable	134 × 12-in	Blücher 8	1 × 8.3-in	0
Seydlitz	390 × 11-in	Lion and Tiger 8,	3 × 13.5-in (1 Tiger, 2 Lion)	159 killed 33 wounded
Moltke	276 × 11-in	Lion and Tiger 8	0	0
Derfflinger	310 × 12-in	Lion, Tiger, and Princess Royal 5 or 6	3 × 13.5-in (1 each Lion; Tiger and Princess Royal)	0
Blücher	12 × 8.2-in	Lion 1 Tiger 1 Indomitable 1	about 70; 7 torpedoes	792 killed 234 prisoners 45 wounded
