= Gasoline Rainbows =

Compilation album by Various artists
- Released: November 30, 2010
- Genre: Alternative
- Length: 61:43
- Label: Roark Records

Gasoline Rainbows is a compilation album by various artists, including Sophia Bush and Austin Nichols (Stars of the Hit CW Network Show One Tree Hill) to benefit the Gulf Coast of the United States from the 2010 BP Oil Spill. The title track Gasoline Rainbows is written and performed by Amy Kuney.

Other artists involved include City and Colour, Vampire Weekend, Silversun Pickups, LCD Soundsystem, Black Rebel Motorcycle Club, The Black Keys, Onward Soldiers, Damien Rice, The National, Edward Sharpe and the Magnetic Zeros, Passion Pit, Phoenix and Surfer Blood.

== Track listing ==
1. "Gasoline Rainbows" - Amy Kuney– 4:36
2. "Armistice" - Phoenix – 3:04
3. "40 Day Dream" - Edward Sharpe and the Magnetic Zeros – 3:53
4. "Moth's Wings" - Passion Pit – 4:16
5. "There's No Secrets This Year" - Silversun Pickups – 5:33
6. "At The Bird's Foot" - City and Colour – 4:21
7. "The Connoisseur of Great Excuse" - Damien Rice – 5:39
8. "Bloodbuzz Ohio" - The National – 4:35
9. "Tighten Up" - The Black Keys – 3:33
10. "Let The Time Roll By" - Onward, Soldiers – 4:58
11. "Floating Vibes" - Surfer Blood – 3:54
12. "Mama Taught Me Better (Live at The Forum)" - Black Rebel Motorcycle Club – 4:35
13. "I Can Change" - LCD Soundsystem – 5:55
14. "Cousins" - Vampire Weekend – 2:25
