= Charles Prestwood Lucas =

British historian and civil servant

Sir Charles Prestwood Lucas KCB KCMG (7 August 1853 – 7 May 1931) was a British civil servant and historian.

Lucas was born at Crickhowell, Brecknockshire, Wales, the youngest son in a large family. He was the grandson of Dr. Henry John Lucas (1773–1840) and Jenetta Illtyds (1776–1821) and son of physician Henry Lucas and Elizabeth Bevan. His sister Mary Anne Lucas married the first Sir Joseph Bailey, later Lord Glanusk. Lucas was educated at Winchester College and Balliol College, Oxford, graduating B.A. in 1884.

Lucas was called to the bar, Lincoln's Inn, on 30 April 1885. He became a civil servant in the Colonial Office which led to his becoming head of the Dominion Department and, in 1907, to his knighthood.

In connection with his role as Assistant Under-Secretary for the Colonies, in 1909 he was appointed Registrar of the Order of St Michael and St George. He held this office until 1911 when he ceased to be a member of the Colonial Office.

In the 1880s he was invited to teach at The Working Men's College. From 1897 to 1903 he became Vice Principal of the college, and from 1912 to 1922 the Principal. In 1920, he became the President of the Geographical Association.

He wrote A Historical Geography Of The British Colonies (1908), A History of Canada: 1763–1812 (1909); Greater Rome and Greater Britain (1912); The Canadian War of 1812 (1912); and The Partition & Colonization of Africa (Clarendon Press 1922).

== Honours ==
- 1901 New Year Honours: Companion of the Order of the Bath, CB
- 9 November 1907: Knight Commander of the Order of St Michael and St George, KCMG
- 1912 New Year Honours: Knight Commander of the Order of the Bath, KCB
