= Stanley Arthur Franklin =

- Born: 30 October 1930; Bow, London, England
- Died: 2 February 2004 (aged 73); Kingston-upon-Thames, England

Stanley Arthur Franklin (30 October 1930 – 2 February 2004) was a British political cartoonist whose career on the Daily Mirror and The Sun newspapers covered almost forty years.

Stanley (Stan) Franklin, born at Bow in the Metropolitan Borough of Poplar, was the son of coppersmith Harry Franklin. He left school at 14, and later attended Hammersmith School of Arts and Crafts where he produced his first cartoon published in Fleet Street, and took classes in lithography at The Working Men's College, Camden. He admired work of the Daily Mirror's Philip Zec which inspired him to become a political cartoonist. However, he failed to gain employment at the Evening Standard, and joined an advertising agency.

First employed as cartoonist with the Daily Herald in 1954, he moved on to the Daily Mirror in 1959, succeeding ‘Vicky’ (Victor Weisz). He stayed at the Mirror until 1970, moved to The Sun in 1974, and worked with that paper until 1998. His work included many cartoons of leading politicians and aristocracy, including several prime ministers, and Prince Philip who collected Franklin's sketches of the Royal Family.

On 9 March 1988, at the height of the parliamentary debate over the introduction of Section 28 (then Clause 28 of the Local Government Bill), The Sun published an editorial cartoon by Franklin which depicted an angry father stringing up his effeminately caricatured son by a rope from a street lamp post after discovering he was gay. Several MPs raised the cartoon on the floor of the House that very day an incitement to violence and an example of the hostile atmosphere being stoked against gay people. The cartoon drew widespread public disgust and was formally referred to the Press Council for promoting homophobic hatred and violence.

As a free-lance cartoonist he produced work for the New Statesman and for illustrated books: Alf Garnett's Little Blue Book (1973), The Thoughts of Chairman Alf (1973), Alf Garnett Scripts (1973), and Dick Emery's In Character (1973). He was a founder member of the British Cartoonists' Association, formed in 1966, and was a member of the Fleets Street's old Press Club and a guarantor of the London Press Club.

Franklin died at Kingston-upon-Thames in 2004.
