= Spin Move Records =

- Founded: 1996
- Founder: Peter A. Barker, Marc Schrobilgen
- Genre: Alternative, indie rock, pop
- Country of origin: U.S.
- Location: Santa Monica, California
- Official website: www.spinmoverecords.com

Spin Move Records is a boutique independent record label based in Santa Monica, California and has released recordings from a variety of artists, including Ainjel Emme, Amy Kuney, Frank Bell, Jessica Sanchez, Rochelle Diamante, and Winsome Kin.

Peter A. Barker founded Spin Move Records in 1996 and then resurrected the label with partner Marc Schrobilgen in 2004. This label is owned by Threshold Media Corp.

== History ==
The first release on Spin Move Records was Winsome Kin's eponymous CD in 1996. The label went on hiatus and was resurrected in 2004 with the release of Amy Kuney's "EP". In 2008 the label released Amy Kuney's full-length Bird's Eye View. Also in 2008 the label started working with a then-14-year-old Jessica Sanchez. A cover version of "Please Don't Stop the Music" was released. Sanchez went on to place 2nd in the 11th season of American Idol in 2012.

Other releases during this period were James Jr's "Intent 2 Distribute" in 2009, Ainjel Emme's "Everyone is Beautiful" in 2011 and Barnaby Saints "EP" in 2012. In 2010 Spin Move started working with YouTube artist Rochelle Diamante. The label released a number of singles culminating in the release of "Queen Bee" in 2013. "Queen Bee" has been featured on Dancing with the Stars on three occasions.

In 2015 Spin Move started working with songwriter/producer Hero DeLano. DeLano started at the label's recording studio as an intern. In 2017 the label released a number of singles by artists Brianna Leah, Jason Parris featuring Beekwilder, Beekwilder, Moses Stone, and ORLY. All of the songs were co-written and produced by DeLano.

In 2016, Dutch singer Sam Beekwilder, known professionally as Beekwilder, began working with the label. Spin Move released his debut single "Oh My" in 2017.

== Former ==
- Ainjel Emme
- Amy Kuney
- Jessica Sanchez
