= Bird's Eye View (album) =

Studio album by Amy Kuney
- Released: August 12, 2008
- Genre: Pop rock
- Length: 39:03
- Label: Spin Move Records
- Producer: Scott Seiver

Amy Kuney chronology
| EP (2006) | Bird's Eye View (2008) | ONYX (2011) |

Professional ratings
Review scores
| Source | Rating |
|---|---|
| PopMatters | 6/10 stars |

Bird's Eye View is the debut full-length album by singer-songwriter Amy Kuney, which was released August 12, 2008 by Spin Move Records. The iTunes version of the album includes a cover of Damien Rice's song, "The Blower's Daughter."

The album was featured on iTunes' "New Releases" and "Indie" music sections from August 12 through August 19. During the months of February and March 2009, "Bird's Eye View was featured on iTunes' "New and Noteworthy" section on the Singer/Songwriter page.

Bird's Eye View was featured on Rhapsody's homepage as a new release, and on WindowsMedia.com under "Emerging Artists."

== Track listing ==
All songs written by Amy Kuney; "The Blower's Daughter" written by Damien Rice.

1. "Simple Things" – 4:14
2. "Rocket Surgery" – 3:59
3. "Angel Tangled In The Telephone Lines" – 3:20
4. "Would You Miss Me" – 3:44
5. "Thank You For Last Night" – 3:12
6. "Love Is Trippy" – 3:57
7. "Appreciate Your Hands" – 3:59
8. "Time Machine" – 2:57
9. "Under My Bed" – 5:53
10. "Bird's Eye View" – 3:48
11. "The Blower's Daughter" (iTunes bonus track)

== Personnel ==
- Drums - Scott Seiver
- Bass - Shawn Davis,
- Piano - Amy Kuney, Scott Seiver,
- Guitars: Scott Seiver, Josh Lopez, Amy Kuney, Ari Hest
- Violin - Marisa Kuney, Elizabeth Headman
- Viola: Rodney Wirtz
- Cello - Ira Glansbeek
- Cajon - Mona Tavakoli
- Saxophone - Ben Wendel
- Tuba - Chuck Koontz
- French Horn - Sarah Bach
- Trombone - Clifford Childers
- Trumpet - Dustin McKinney
- Melodica - Scott Seiver
- Wurlitzer - Scott Seiver
- Mellotron - Scott Seiver
- Synthesizer - Scott Seiver
- Tambourine - Scott Seiver
- Timpani - Scott Seiver
- Shaker - Scott Seiver
- Organ - Scott Seiver
- String Arrangements - Scott Seiver
- Horn Arrangement - Scott Seiver
- Choir Arrangement - Scott Seiver
- Orchestration - Ben Wendel
- Backing Vocals - Scott Seiver, Ari Hest, Azusa Pacific University Choir,
- Horn Section Contracting - Ben Wendel
- String Section Contracting - Marisa Kuney

=== Production ===
- Produced by Scott Seiver
- Mixed by Peter A. Barker and Scott Seiver
- Engineered by Peter A. Barker (additional engineering by Scott Seiver)
- Assistant Engineers: Scott Coslett, Todd Bergman, Ursula Arevalo
- Mastered by Gil Tamazyan
- Recording Studios: Threshold Sound + Vision and Loma Lada Studios
- Executive Producers: Peter A. Barker, Marc Schrobilgen,
