= Bad Side...LIVE! =

- Genre: Comedic Talk Show
- Running time: 1 Hour
- Country of origin: Worldwide
- Language: English
- Home station: TalkRadioX
- Starring: "Tyler Hollywood"
- Original release: 2002 – 2016
- Website: Bad Side...LIVE!

Bad Side...LIVE! was a radio talk show on terrestrial and internet radio. The show was broadcast live Monday through Thursday at 9:00pm EST from the Williston, Vermont home of host "Tyler Hollywood".

== History ==
Bad Side...LIVE! began in 2002 as a sports talk show on a peer-to-peer network as "Ground Zero Radio". By 2006, the station moved to its present home on Internet radio broadcaster TalkRadioX. Hollywood calls the show is a mix of "talk, skit, music and rant". Kristy Khaos, the show's previous co-host, is on an indefinite leave of absence. In 2013 the show was renamed The Tyler Hollywood Show. The show ended in early 2016.

As of January 2019 there is talk of the show restarting on a rebooted version of TalkRadioX.

== Stations ==
With the show's home at TalkRadioX, the show is also broadcast via TalkRadioX's stream on internet radio streamer 1.FM. The show is also broadcast on Part 15 Broadcaster "KTRX" from McKinney, Texas.

== Awards ==
Bad Side...LIVE! was awarded to the "Frontier Fifty" by Talkers Magazine three years in a row, from 2009 to 2011.
