= Hopeless Romantic (Michelle Branch song) =

Single by Michelle Branch

from the album Hopeless Romantic
- Released: February 3, 2017
- Length: 3:30
- Label: Verve
- Songwriters: Michelle Branch; Patrick Carney; Gus Seyffert; Amy Kuney; Harlan Silverman
- Producer: Patrick Carney

Michelle Branch singles chronology
"Loud Music" (2011)	"Hopeless Romantic" (2017)	"I'm a Man" (2022)

"Hopeless Romantic" is a song by American singer and songwriter Michelle Branch, released as the lead single from her third studio album of the same name on February 3, 2017. The song was written by Branch, Patrick Carney of The Black Keys, Gus Seyffert, Amy Kuney and Harlan Silverman. Produced by Carney, it is Branch's first single since 2011's "Loud Music".

== Background ==
After breaking up with her country duo The Wreckers in 2008, Branch announced that she was working on a new solo album titled Everything Comes and Goes which was slated for a June 2008 release, but due to personal and professional struggles the full album went unreleased. Although an abridged version was eventually released as an EP in 2010. Branch attempted to release her next album titled West Coast Time in 2011 which also ended up being scrapped, again due to issues with her record label Reprise Records and its parent company Warner Bros. Records. At this point, Branch was seriously considering to quit the music industry.

In 2015, Branch filed for divorce from Teddy Landau after eleven years of marriage, she requested joint custody of her daughter, Owen Isabelle. In June later that year, Branch announced via Instagram that she had signed a new recording contract with Verve Records. Around this time, Branch began dating Patrick Carney of The Black Keys and the pair began co-writing for her next album Hopeless Romantic.

== Reception ==
Alexa Shouneyia of Billboard praised the song adding that "[Branch's] smooth vocals perfectly complement the mid-tempo, laid-back drums and guitar throughout the song."

== Release ==
The song premiered on February 2, 2017 exclusively on the Billboard website from her Vevo channel and was made available to stream and purchase the next day.

A music video for "Hopeless Romantic" was released on February 16. The clip is directed by Brian Higbee, photographer and Michelle's personal friend. The singer said to Entertainment Weekly that she wish to be darker, and focus in the mood on the video. "I haven't had a video out in so long, so I wanted to push the envelope in that sense, and not have something that was ‘cheery’ or what people expect from me".

== Formats and track listings ==
- Single
1. "Hopeless Romantic" – 3:30
