= The Trouble with Fever =

Studio album by Michelle Branch
- Released: September 16, 2022
- Genres: Pop; rock
- Length: 35:05
- Label: Nonesuch
- Producers: Michelle Branch; Patrick Carney

Michelle Branch chronology
Hopeless Romantic (2017)	The Trouble with Fever (2022)

Singles from The Trouble with Fever
- 1. "I'm a Man" Released: June 15, 2022; 2. "Not My Lover" Released: September 16, 2022

The Trouble with Fever is the fifth studio album by American singer-songwriter Michelle Branch. It was co-produced by Patrick Carney of The Black Keys and written solely by Branch. The album was released on September 16, 2022, through Audio Eagle/Nonesuch Records and Warner Records. The album's lead single, "I'm a Man", was released on July 15, 2022. In support of the album, Branch embarked on The Trouble With Fever Tour, which commenced on September 15, 2022, with special guest Bad Bad Hats and Katelyn Tarver.

== Background ==
During the 2020 pandemic lockdown, Branch found herself in the studio with Patrick Carney. In a press release she said "I didn’t realize I was making a record at first — it was more just for our own sanity, getting time together to play music and screw around in the studio." Branch told Billboard Magazine that due to the pandemic the writing process was very different. It was the first time she has written by herself in a long time. "I love collaborating with people, and had gotten in the flow of doing that ever since my Nashville days with The Wreckers, being a part of a songwriting community. And this was the first time that I was like, "Okay, I’m writing songs by myself." And it was nice to use that muscle again, and force myself to finish things on my own." During the writing process for the album Branch found inspiration in a lyric book by David Berman from the Silver Jews. She would sit there, flipping through the pages of that book. "Just the cadence, the way he writes, was really inspiring to me – the way that he’s just so direct."

During an interview with Nylon in September 2021, Branch announced the title for the record for the first time. In the same interview, she mentions that The Trouble with Fever will have the same vein as Hopeless Romantic. The title explores the consequences of lust in all of its various forms. "It's more about the fever of lust, wanting someone, that first foray where you're falling for someone."

The cover art for the album is a photograph that was captured by James Carney in 1970 during his time at Cape Cod Beach. Branch found the photo while she was looking for ideas for an album cover. She explains in an Instagram post that "it was like this photograph had been plucked straight from my imagination. It was evocative and moody. You could feel the stifling summer heat radiating through it."

== Promotion and release ==
On July 12, 2022, Branch announced on social media that the first single from the upcoming album will be titled "I'm a Man" and that it would be released July 15. The song is a protest song that started as an empathetic view towards men struggling to find a new way to navigate in a post-‘Me Too’ world of toxic masculinity. A few hours prior to the release, she revealed the artwork for the album. A second single, "Not My Lover", was released on September 15, 2022. She performed it live for the first time on the Tamron Hall Show.

== Critical reception ==
Professional ratings
Review scores
Source	Rating
The Guardian	3/5 stars
musicOMH	3/5 stars
Pitchfork	5.1/10

In a positive review from That Music Magazine, Noelle Simeon wrote that "Branch can go deep into her feelings. Having complete creative control, Fever is a labor of love, and she allows herself to capture the mood of each song." Closing out the review, "Michelle Branch is a true musician's musician, and The Trouble with Fever enraptures all of her talents beautifully."

Pete Tosiello of Pitchfork was more critical, writing that "the album isn’t bold enough to commit in any one direction, offsetting whispery synth-pop with saccharine country ballads. Still, the most glaring structural defects are overarching. The dressed-up guitars range from staticky to syrupy; the arrangements meander into melodramatic bridges", continuing by calling the instrumentation "bewildering" and the record a "mishmash" overall. Jenessa Williams, writing for The Guardian, commented that the album "shouldn’t be consumed as scandal. Instead, it should be taken for what it is: a solid country-pop record. It’s a celebration of endings: a fortifying, bridging album that guides its author towards, hopefully, happier times." Ben Hogwood of musicOMH concurred, writing that The Trouble with Fever "plots a relatively safe musical course amid turbulent personal life events".

== Track listing ==
All tracks co-produced by Michelle Branch and Patrick Carney except where noted.

The Trouble with Fever track listing
No.	Title	Length
1.	"Closest Thing to Heaven"	3:29
2.	"You Got Me Where You Want Me"	3:29
3.	"I'm a Man"	3:01
4.	"Not My Lover"	3:10
5.	"When That Somebody Is You"	3:30
6.	"You"	3:34
7.	"Zut Alors!"	3:17
8.	"Fever Forever"	3:26
9.	"Beating on the Outside"	4:31
10.	"I’m Sorry"	3:38
Total length:		35:05

Japanese bonus track
No.	Title	Writer(s)	Length
11.	"One Night" (demo)	Kuney; Branch, Pearson	3:36

== Personnel ==
- Michelle Branch – vocals, keyboards, acoustic guitars, electric guitars
- Patrick Carney – electric guitars, bass, drums, percussion
- Casey Kaufman – cello

=== Production ===
- Michelle Branch – producer
- Patrick Carney – producer
- Marc Whitmore – engineer
- Tchad Blake – mixing at Full Mongrel Studios (Wales, UK)
- Ryan Smith – mastering at Sterling Sound (New York, NY)
- Stephen Walker – art direction, design
- Sonya Jasinski – photography
- James Carney – front cover photography

== Charts ==
Chart performance for The Trouble with Fever
Chart (2022)	Peak position
UK Album Downloads (OCC)	92
UK Americana Albums (OCC)	8
US Top Album Sales (Billboard)	61
US Top Current Album Sales (Billboard)	49
