= Lindsay Jacob =

Australian rules footballer

Personal information
- Born: 24 November 1946
- Died: 8 July 2014 (aged 67)
- Original teams: Walla Walla, Corowa
- Height: 173 cm (5 ft 8 in)
- Weight: 71 kg (157 lb)

Playing career^{1}
Years	Club	Games (Goals)
1969	North Melbourne	2 (2)
- ^{1} Playing statistics correct to the end of 1969.

Lindsay Jacob (24 November 1946 – 8 July 2014) was an Australian rules footballer who played with North Melbourne in the Victorian Football League (VFL).

Jacob started his career in the Hume Football League, playing for Walla Walla. In 1966, a premiership year, Jacob was the youngest ever winner of the league's best and fairest award, the Azzi Medal. He joined Ovens & Murray Football League side Corowa the following year and in 1968 was a member of their premiership team.

A rover, Jacob made two appearances for North Melbourne in the 1969 VFL season. He made his debut in their opening round win over South Melbourne at Arden Street and also played the following week against Melbourne at the Melbourne Cricket Ground.

Jacob captain-coached Kedron in Queensland from 1970 to 1974.

Having already played in NSW, Victoria and Queensland, Jacob made his way to a fourth state in 1975 to play for Tasmanian club Ulverstone.

Jacob was back at Kedron in 1976 and 1977, then had a stint with Sherwood, before returning to Kedron to play in the 1980 and 1981 seasons. Over the course of his career in Queensland, he represented the state in 10 interstate games and was state captain in 1970.
