= Sooner or Later (Michelle Branch song) =

Single by Michelle Branch

from the EP Everything Comes and Goes
- Released: June 29, 2009
- Genre: Country pop
- Length: 3:09
- Label: Warner Bros. Nashville
- Songwriters: Michelle Branch, John Shanks, Hillary Lindsey
- Producer: John Shanks

Michelle Branch singles chronology
"I'm Feeling You" (2005)	"Sooner or Later" (2009)	"Loud Music" (2011)

Music video
- "Sooner or Later" at CMT.com

"Sooner or Later" is a song written by John Shanks, Hillary Lindsey, and co-written and recorded by American artist Michelle Branch. It was released as the lead-off single to her six-song solo country EP, Everything Comes and Goes. "Sooner or Later" was released as a digital download on June 29, 2009 and later sent to country radio on August 11, 2009. This is Branch's first country single, and her first release since The Wreckers, a country duo consisting of Branch and Jessica Harp, was placed on hold in favor of solo careers for both members.

== Content ==
"Sooner or Later" is a moderate up-tempo country song driven by acoustic guitar, with prominent banjo and steel guitar fills. The narrator describes a friend, who she really wants to be with, but he doesn't know yet. She finishes by saying that he will realize she is the perfect match "sooner or later".

Branch, who wrote the song with John Shanks and Hillary Lindsey, stated the song was based on her experience of being only a friend when she wanted more.

== Reception ==
Dan Milliken of Country Universe gave a negative review, and compared it to Taylor Swift's "You Belong with Me". "I didn’t sit in when this was made or anything, but it sounds like it passed through so many levels of self-consciousness that most of the personality just got rubbed out of the mix at some point, leaving behind a flimsy song and a recycled production."

== Music video ==
The music video, which was directed by Liz Friedlander, premiered during CMT's Big New Music Weekend on October 2, 2009. The video begins with Branch driving a Volkswagen van and picking up a guy. She drives through the desert before coming to a stop at a junkyard, then at some ruins. Throughout the video, Branch is also shown performing with her acoustic guitar while sitting on a leather chair beside the road and at an old gas station. In the end, the man puts his arm around her and they walk away together.

== Chart performance ==
"Sooner or Later" debuted at number 59 on the U.S. Billboard Hot Country Songs chart for the chart week of September 5, 2009 and peaked at number 46 in late October 2009. It also debuted and peaked at number 93 on the U.S. Billboard Hot 100 and at number 35 on the U.S. Billboard Hot Adult Top 40 Tracks.

== Charts ==
Chart (2009)	Peak position
US Billboard Hot 100	93
US Adult Pop Airplay (Billboard)	35
US Hot Country Songs (Billboard)	46
