= Justincase =

US musical group

- Origin: Charlotte, North Carolina
- Genres: Alternative pop
- Years active: 1998–2003
- Labels: Maverick
- Members: Justin Tosco; Nick Tosco; Hannah Tosco
- Website: www.myspace.com/justincaseband

Justincase was an American alternative-pop band from Charlotte, North Carolina, best known for their 2002 single "Don't Cry for Us", which was co-written by Michelle Branch, who was one of the band's early champions. Consisting of teen siblings Hannah, Justin, and Nick Tosco, the band was signed to Maverick Records. Justin was lead vocalist and guitarist as well as principal songwriter. Nick played drums, and Hannah was on bass.

== History ==
Band members Justin (the oldest, born 1983), Nick, and Hannah (the youngest) Tosco grew up in a musical household. Their father, John, worked in the Charlotte music scene and also taught guitar, while their mother, Holly Tosco, worked as a piano teacher. Justin was five years old when he wrote his first song, which was about baseball. The trio began playing gigs together before all were in junior high school. Their first concert was at their middle school's talent show in 1998.

The Toscos met Michelle Branch before her debut on Maverick Records and became friends over the Internet before meeting in Las Vegas for a music convention in 2000. Justincase was signed to Maverick Records in late 2001 with the help of Branch.

The band released its self-titled debut album on October 29, 2002. The album included several collaborations with Michelle Branch, including the lead single, "Don't Cry for Us". Michelle Branch promoted the album on MTV's Total Request Live. Other media appearances included the radio show Open House Party and Nickelodeon's TV show All That. After their first music video was shown on MTV, Wal-Mart agreed to sponsor a short tour to further promote the album. The band played several solo shows, and also opened for Nick Carter on his Backstreet Boy tour. Billboard writer David Menconi called Justincase an "act to watch," describing the group as "three clean-cut teenage siblings" whose music is "steeped in classic-rock verities." Newsday critic Kevin Amorim called the band's music "rootsy feel-good Hooters-esque rock (hey, at least it wasn't emo)." Guitar-maker Ibanez published a series of ads featuring the band.

Despite heavy promotion, the album lagged commercially. Lackluster sales numbers caused Maverick to drop the band in 2003, and they have been unable to secure another recording contract. The band was indicated that they were on "indefinite hiatus" while its members attended college and played the occasional local show. Lead singer Justin Tosco was also performing with Policy, another local band.

== Justincase (album) ==
Justincase

Studio album by Justincase
- Released: October 29, 2002
- Genre: Pop/rock, Alternative
- Length: 40:49
- Label: Maverick
- Producer: John Shanks, Greg Wells, Dave Bassett, Steven Haigler, Patrick Tanner

Justincase is the band's self-titled debut studio album.

=== Track listing ===
All songs were written by Justin Tosco, except where noted.

1. "What I Wouldn't Do" – 3:57
2. "Don't Cry For Us" (Justin Tosco, John Shanks, Michelle Branch) – 3:42
3. "I'm There" – 4:11
4. "Tell Me (What I Mean To You)" (J. Tosco, Dave Bassett) – 4:01
5. "Letter" (J. Tosco, Greg Wells) - 3:33
6. "Without You (Feat. Michelle Branch)" (J. Tosco, Shanks) – 3:59
7. "Inside Your Mind" (J. Tosco, Bassett) – 3:30
8. "It Was Something" – 3:58
9. "Constellation" – 3:15
10. "9:14" – 3:12
11. "The Best That I Could Do" – 3:32

=== Personnel ===
- Justin Tosco – lead vocals, guitars, keyboards
- Hannah Tosco - bass
- Nick Tosco – drums, percussion, backing vocals
- Michelle Branch - additional vocals on track 6
- Rick Seamster - additional guitar on tracks 8, 10, and 11; harmony on track 8
- Jason Adkins - hammond b-3 on track 11
- Roger Manning - synthesizer on tracks 4 and 7; hammond b-3 on track 4
- Dave Bassett - additional guitar and backing vocals on tracks 4 and 7
- John Shanks - additional guitars and programming on tracks 1, 2, 3, 6, and 9
- Patrick Warren - additional keyboards on tracks 1, 2, and 3
