= AMES (singer) =

American singer-songwriter (born 1985)

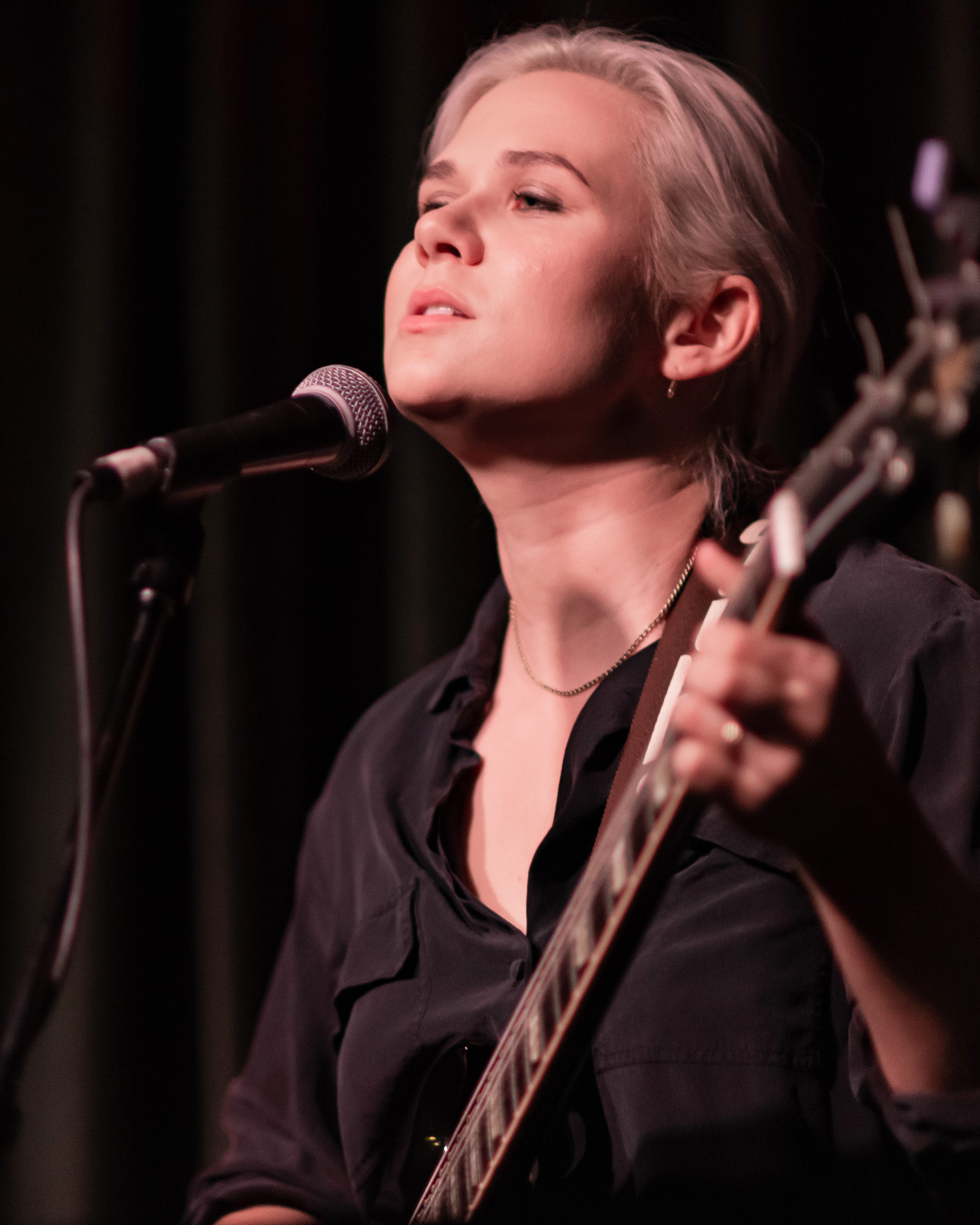
- Kuney in 2018

Background information
- Born: Amy Kathryn Kuney; August 6, 1985 (age 41); Tulsa, Oklahoma, U.S.
- Genres: Pop, pop rock
- Occupations: Singer-songwriter, guitarist
- Instruments: Vocals, guitar, piano
- Years active: 2008–present

Amy Kuney (born August 6, 1985), known professionally as AMES, is an American singer, songwriter, and musician.

Kuney became well known for her videos on YouTube, which included covers and original songs. Kuney has posted covers of songs by Joni Mitchell, Damien Rice, P!nk, Fleetwood Mac, Coldplay, Jace Everett, Patty Griffin, and Sam Sparro. She has since become a known songwriter and artist in her own regard.

== Early life ==
Kuney began piano lessons at the age of four and participated in piano recitals and church performances growing up. She wrote her first song at the age of 12. When she was 13, Kuney's father moved the family from their home in Oklahoma to Honduras to live as missionaries after he saw a video highlighting the destruction of Hurricane Mitch. Kuney started playing guitar when she taught herself guitar chords off of a poster her dad bought from Wal-Mart after a trip to the United States at the age of 16.

== Career ==
=== 2008–2010: Bird's Eye View ===
Kuney's song, which she co-wrote with Tim Myers, "All Downhill From Here" opened the season 5 finale of One Tree Hill on May 19, 2008. The song was also featured in the documentary Catfish. Other placements include: NBC's The Blacklist, HBO's Looking, Netflix's Hemlock Grove, FOX's So You Think You Can Dance, and advertisements for Macy's, Kleenex, and Pandora.

Kuney opened for The Veronicas in the summer of 2008.

After he heard her cover of his song, The Blower's Daughter, on YouTube, Damien Rice invited Kuney to tour with him in Iceland.

Spin Move Records released Kuney's debut full-length album, "Bird's Eye View," on August 12, 2008.

LnA Clothing featured Kuney's song, "Simple Things," on "The Invisible DJ LnA Music Tee," which the company released online and at Ron Herman stores starting in May 2009. Purchasers of the t-shirt received a code to download all of the songs listed on the t-shirt from the LnA website.

As part of Donate Life's Concert Series at The Grove at Farmers Market presented by Palm, Inc. and the Palm Pre and hosted by KBIG-FM, Kuney opened for Gavin Rossdale.

=== 2010–2017: MYPET and co-writing ===
One Tree Hill featured Kuney's song, "Hope A Little Harder," on their September 21, 2010, episode, "I Can't See You, But I Know You're There."

Her song, "Gasoline Rainbows," was featured as the title track on a compilation album, also titled Gasoline Rainbows, benefitting the Gulf of Mexico following the Deepwater Horizon oil spill, which released on November 30, 2010. The compilation included music by LCD Soundsystem, Phoenix, Silversun Pickups, Vampire Weekend, Edward Sharpe & The Magnetic Zeros, amongst others. "Gasoline Rainbows" was also featured in the fourth season of So You Think You Can Dance Canada. A dance to the song was choreographed by Stacey Tookey and performed by dancers Geisha Chin and Joey Arrigo.

In 2013, Amy Kuney formed an electronic band called MYPET with Ray Brady and Elmo Lovano. They released their single "Pays to Know" through UK label Luv Luv Luv and toured Europe as well as releasing several music videos to promote their Reflex EP.

In 2015, she was awarded with the ASCAP Sammy Cahn Songwriting Award for her song "The World". Past winners include John Mayer and Lori McKenna. That same year, she signed a publishing deal with Kobalt Music, and began releasing music under "Ames" and writing for other artists.

On April 7, 2017, Michelle Branch released the album Hopeless Romantic which featured eight songs co-written by Amy Kuney including the title track, which was released as the sole single on February 3, 2017.

On September 7, 2017, Kelly Clarkson released “Move You,” co-written by Amy Kuney, as a promo single from her forthcoming album Meaning of Life. Said album would see release on October 27, 2017, featuring a second co-written track from Kuney titled “Slow Dance.”

=== 2018–Present: AMES ===
AMES signed with a new record label, Mateo Sound, in January 2018. After taking a 3-year break to write for other artists she rebranded as AMES and started recording her new EP, self-titled "My Name is AMES."

AMES performed her first concert as AMES at the second stage at The Hotel Cafe on August 6, 2018, the setlist featured several new songs, such as "Old Hero", "Mama It's Me", "Hold On", "Picture In My Mind" and a cover of Kelly Clarkson's "Slow Dance". Following the show's success Kuney announced a short residency at the venue, featuring 4 shows on January and February 2019.

The EP's debut single "Hold On" was release through Mateo Sound on September 27, the song premiere on The Fader to positive reviews. The single art as well as the article headline were quickly picked up by several of Kuney's peers, including Michelle Branch and Molly Kate Kestner, as well as several other online publications such as Nylon Magazine and music blog Indie Shuffle.

On October 26, she announced a second single off the EP "Picture In My Mind", the song, along with a Donnie Darko themed live performance premiered on Billboard Pride on October 31, 2018.

In January 2019, she did a four date residency at The Hotel Cafe on January 4, 11, 18, and February 1 performing songs off of the upcoming EP.

The next single debuted on February 15 titled "Old Hero," which was inspired by true events in her life of friends who gave their lives to protect others. This coincided with a guest article writing for Milk's Gender Diaries.

The final single from the forthcoming EP was released on March 29 titled "Mama, It's Me" as a tender ballad to a worried mother assuring her that her child is grown, safe, and found love. The six track "My Name is AMES" EP dropped one week later on April 5 also featuring new tracks "Between" and "Curious." This was supported by a publicity tour in New York including a live interview and performance broadcast on YouTube from Paste Magazine. She would also have an in-studio appearance for Logo performing “Mama, It’s Me” and “Hold On.”

In 2019, Ames collaborated with Tim Myers on a project called "AROWS" signed to Position Music. Since the project was released, songs from their debut EP have been featured on a third-season episode of Siesta Key, Selling Sunset, and worldwide Samsung Galaxy product campaigns.

For Adam Lambert, Kuney co-wrote the song “Overglow,” which would see its initial release on the Velvet Side A EP on September 27, 2019, followed by the full album release on March 20, 2020. A live in-studio recording of the track would be included on Velvet Side A - The Live Sessions, released on January 20, 2020. The song was included in Lambert's live set lists in late 2019 and subsequent tours.

During the COVID-19 pandemic in 2020, Mateo Sound dissolved and Amy returned to producing and releasing her music independently while exploring other projects and expanding her songwriting credits.

The track “Sister Ray” from the Foxes album The Kick was also co-written by Kuney, and was released as a single on September 25, 2021, ahead of the full album release on February 11, 2022. The track would be featured in an eighth-season episode of Love Island.

In the Fall of 2021, Kuney began teaching in the Music Industry department at the Herb Alpert School of Music at UCLA as a professor of Songwriting.

The following year, Ames’ single “Hymn For Her” was released ahead of Valentine's Day on February 11, 2022. The song would be featured in a second-season episode of Warrior Nun. She would later release the song "in this life" which was written in tribute to the show's fans who had shown her so much love in return for her support of the show. Kuney later launched a side project named I Amethyst to experiment with different, more aggressive emotions with the first single, “Your Queen,” being released on Friday, May 13, 2022.

In May 2023, Chappell Roan's chart-topping single, co-written by Amy, Red Wine Supernova was released, from the later September 2023 album release The Rise and Fall of a Midwest Princess.

In 2024, Amy signed non-exclusive sync deals with Position Music, Angry Mob Music, and Honestly Good Music, throwing herself into sync projects for film and television. Her song "How to Say Goodbye," a collaboration with Belinda Huang (BEZA) was placed in Season 7, Episode 6 of The Good Doctor.

== Discography ==
=== Albums ===
- EP (2006)
- Bird's Eye View (2008)
- Reflex (2013)
- My Name is AMES (2019)

=== Singles ===
Year	Title	Album
2008	"All Downhill From Here (feat. Tim Myers)"	All Downhill From Here (Single)
2008	"Love Is Trippy" (promo)	Bird's Eye View
2008	"River"	River (Single)
2010	"Hope A Little Harder"	Hope A Little Harder (Single)
2010	"Gasoline Rainbows"	Gasoline Rainbows
2011	"Gasoline Rainbows"	Gasoline Rainbows (Single)
2011	"Where I Can't Follow"	Where I Can't Follow (Single)
2011	"Waiting For You"	Waiting For You (Single)
2011	"Kiss Me Like You Mean It"	Kiss Me Like You Mean It (Single)
2012	"Show Me Your Fire"	Show Me Your Fire (Single)
2013	"Pays to Know"	Pays to Know (Single)
2015	"Make It"	Make It (Single)
2015	"Fluid"	Fluid (Single)
2016	"Harder"	Harder (Single)
2016	"Flowers for Anna"	Flowers for Anna (Single)
2018	"Hold On"	My Name is AMES (EP)
2018	"Picture In My Mind"	My Name is AMES (EP)
2019	"Old Hero	My Name is AMES (EP)
2019	"Mama, It's Me"	My Name is AMES (EP)
2022	"Hymn For Her"	Hymn For Her (Single)
2022	"Your Queen" (as I Amethyst)	Your Queen (Single)
2023	"Soak It In"	Soak It In (Single)
2023	"Where I Am"	Where I Am (Single)
2023	"Taking Up The Bed"	Taking Up The Bed (Single)
2023	"in this life"	in this life (Single)
2024	"Body Keeps the Score"	Body Keeps the Score (Single)
2024	"How To Say Goodbye" (w/Beza)	How To Say Goodbye (Single)
2025	"tooth and nail"	tooth and nail (Single)
2026	"Black Flowers"	Black Flowers (Single)
2026	"Over Me (Fairlane & DJ Mii feat. AMES)"	Project:Solace (album by Fairlane)
