= I'm a Man (Michelle Branch song) =

Single by Michelle Branch

from the album The Trouble with Fever
- Released: July 15, 2022
- Length: 3:01
- Label: Nonesuch
- Songwriters: Michelle Branch; Patrick Carney
- Producer: Patrick Carney

Michelle Branch singles chronology
"Hopeless Romantic" (2017)	"I'm a Man" (2022)

Music video
- "I'm a Man" on YouTube

"I'm a Man" is a protest song by American singer and songwriter Michelle Branch. The single was released on July 14, 2022, through Nonesuch Records. It serves as the lead single from her fourth studio album The Trouble with Fever, released on September 16, 2022. The song tackles women's rights, toxic masculinity, reproductive rights, sexual harassment, and more. It was written by Branch and her husband Patrick Carney of the Black Keys.

== Background ==
In August 2018 Branch gave birth to her first son with Patrick Carney. When writing "I'm a Man", Branch says, "having a son made me think of how men are taught to be from a young age and the pressures to provide and succeed and this sort of burden to be seen as macho."

The song started as an empathetic view towards men struggling to find a new way to navigate in a post-‘Me Too’ world of toxic masculinity but it later started telling the story of the struggles that women have also been dealing with, "really, since Eve bit the apple."

Branch asks rhetorically, "why are nearly all mass shooters male? Why do I need my husband’s written permission in 2022 to get my tubes tied? Why do American women have fewer reproductive rights than our grandmothers? Why don’t we get paid as much as men? Why do I have to teach my daughters not to walk alone at night? And so on and so on."

== Music video ==
Following the release of "I'm a Man", the official music video was released shortly after. The accompanying music video features incorporating footage from the Silent Parade, a dyke march, and a protest during arguments for Dobbs v. Jackson Women's Health Organization at the Supreme Court. The video also shows other footage from the ‘50s through today, highlighting the ways in which women have fought for their rights.
