= Everything Comes and Goes =

EP by Michelle Branch
- Released: July 16, 2010
- Recorded: 2008–2009
- Studio: Starstruck Studios, Sound Stage Studios and Nashville Noise (Nashville, Tennessee); Henson Recording Studios (Hollywood, California); New York Noise (New York City, New York)
- Genre: Country pop
- Length: 20:51 (EP); 49:57 (Promo album)
- Label: Reprise Nashville
- Producer: John Leventhal; John Shanks

Michelle Branch chronology
Hotel Paper (2003)	Everything Comes and Goes (2010)	Hopeless Romantic (2017)

Singles from Everything Comes and Goes
- 1. "Sooner or Later" Released: June 29, 2009

Everything Comes and Goes is an EP by Michelle Branch, released to her official website on July 16, 2010, and was released at iTunes on August 27, 2010.

The EP was recorded at Starstruck Studios, Soundstage Studios, and Nashville Noise in Nashville, Tennessee as well as Henson Studios in Hollywood, California and New York Noise, from 2008 to 2009. The EP was dubbed as a 'bonus album' by the singer herself. It spawned one single, "Sooner or Later" which became a minor commercial hit, peaking at #93 on the US Billboard Hot 100 and #46 on the US Billboard Hot Country Songs chart. Everything Comes and Goes was intended to be released as a full album consisting of 13 tracks, including a duet with Dwight Yoakam on a song titled "Long Goodbye". However, due to changes at Warner Bros. Records, the album's release date was pushed back multiple times and ultimately was released as an EP. Several intended album tracks from the original record, including "Long Goodbye", "Texas In The Mirror" and "Take a Chance On Me", were later released individually as free downloads for a limited amount of time. On a live webchat to fans on May 26, 2011, Branch revealed a previously unreleased track from Everything Comes and Goes, "Through the Radio" would be included on her new studio album West Coast Time as a hidden track - however, the album remains unreleased due to label issues. Other tracks from the recording sessions that did not make the final cut for this album were "I'm Not Gonna Follow You Home" and "Just Let Me In".

Professional ratings
Review scores
Source	Rating
Allmusic	3/5 stars

== Development ==
After the release of her second studio album, Hotel Paper, Branch's solo career came to a halt while she focused on the band The Wreckers. The group split in 2007. In October 2007, Branch announced that she was working on a new solo album and later reported the title would be Everything Comes and Goes. The album was reported to have embraced more country essences than her previous releases. In June 2008, she played several live shows in preparation for the album's release with her sister Nicole singing backing vocals. During the recording sessions for Everything Comes and Goes, Branch recorded many tracks, some that were not included on the final six-track EP. These included songs called "Jack And Jim", "Carry Me, "Pretty Little Lyin' Eyes" and "Through the Radio". After problems at her record label caused severe delays in the release of the album, Branch released the project as a six-track EP on July 16, 2010. Three songs from the sessions, "Take A Chance On Me", "Texas In The Mirror" and "Long Goodbye," were later released as limited time free downloads from the singer's website.

== Singles ==
"Sooner or Later" was released on June 29, 2009, as the lead single from Everything Comes and Goes. Musically, the song is a moderate up-tempo country song driven by acoustic guitar, with prominent banjo and steel guitar fills and was written by Branch along with John Shanks and Hillary Lindsey. It was a minor commercial hit, peaking at 93 in the US Billboard Hot 100. A music video for "Sooner or Later" directed by Liz Friedlander, premiered during CMT's Big New Music Weekend on October 2, 2009.

A track called "This Way" was intended to be included on the full-length album as the lead single. A music video directed by Raphael Mazucco was filmed, but "This Way" was not included on the six-track EP.

== In other media ==
"Texas in the Mirror" and a brand new song called "What Don't Kill You" were included in the soundtrack of the 2013 film Tiger Eyes, starring Willa Holland.

== Track listing ==
Everything Comes and Goes track listing
No.	Title	Writer(s)	Length
1.	"Ready to Let You Go"	Michelle Branch; John Leventhal	2:53
2.	"Sooner or Later"	Branch; Hillary Lindsey; John Shanks	3:07
3.	"I Want Tears"	Lindsey; Shanks	3:33
4.	"Crazy Ride"	Branch; Lindsey	3:45
5.	"Summertime"	Branch; Lindsey; Shanks	4:12
6.	"Everything Comes and Goes"	Branch	3:18
Total length:			20:51

Everything Comes and Goes track listing (U.S. promo album)
No.	Title	Writer(s)	Length
1.	"This Way"	Branch	3:46
2.	"Sooner or Later"	Branch; Lindsey; Shanks	3:07
3.	"I Want Tears"	Lindsey; Shanks	3:33
4.	"Crazy Ride"	Branch; Lindsey	3:45
5.	"Ready to Let You Go"	Branch; Leventhal	2:53
6.	"Show Me a Sign"	Branch; Leventhal	3:47
7.	"Long Goodbye" (with Dwight Yoakam)	Branch; Lindsey	3:48
8.	"Summertime"	Branch; Lindsey; Shanks	4:12
9.	"Texas in the Mirror"	Branch	4:36
10.	"I'm Not That Strong"	Branch; Lindsey; Shanks	4:08
11.	"Pretty Little Lyin' Eyes"	Branch; Leventhal	3:37
12.	"Everything Comes and Goes"	Branch	3:18
13.	"Through the Radio"	Branch; Lindsey; Shanks	5:27
Total length:			49:57

== Personnel ==
- Michelle Branch – vocals, acoustic guitar
- John Shanks – keyboards (2, 3, 5), guitars (2, 3, 5), bass (2, 3)
- Charles Judge – acoustic piano (5), Hammond B3 organ (5)
- John Leventhal – guitars (1, 4, 6), bass (1, 4), organ (4, 6), banjo (4), dobro (4, 6)
- Greg Leisz – guitars (2, 5), lap steel guitar (2, 5), pedal steel guitar (2), mandolin (5)
- Larry Campbell – fiddle (1), steel guitar (6)
- Dan Dugmore – pedal steel guitar (3)
- Teddy Landau – bass (5)
- Shawn Pelton – drums (1, 4)
- Abe Laboriel Jr. – drums (2, 3)
- Jeff Rothschild – drum programming (3)
- Jim Keltner – drums (5)
- Rick Depofi – percussion (6)
- Hillary Lindsey – backing vocals (2, 3), harmony vocals (4, 6)

=== Production ===
- Carole Ann Mobley – A&R
- Kevin Williamson – A&R
- John Leventhal – producer (1, 4, 6), mixing (6)
- Rick Depofi – co-producer (1, 4, 6)
- John Shanks – producer (2, 3, 5)
- Jeff Rothschild – engineer (2, 3, 5)
- Justin Niebank – mixing (1–5)
- Lars Fox – Pro Tools editing (2, 3, 5)
- Andrew Mendelson – mastering at Georgetown Masters (Nashville, Tennessee)
- Shari Sutcliffe – music contractor
- Jill Dell'Abate – production coordinator
- Ellen Wakayama – art direction
- Stephen Walker – art direction, design
- Raphael Mazzucco – photography

== Charts ==
Chart (2010)	Peak position
US Top Current Album Sales (Billboard)	194
US Top Country Albums (Billboard)	35
