= Hopeless Romantic (Michelle Branch album) =

Studio album by Michelle Branch
- Released: April 7, 2017
- Recorded: 2015–2016
- Studios: Sargent Recorders (Los Angeles, California); Full Mongrel Studios (Wales, UK)
- Genres: Indie pop; rock
- Length: 52:21
- Label: Verve
- Producers: Michelle Branch; Patrick Carney; Gus Seyffert

Michelle Branch chronology
Everything Comes and Goes (2010)	Hopeless Romantic (2017)	The Trouble with Fever (2022)

Singles from Hopeless Romantic
- 1. "Hopeless Romantic" Released: February 3, 2017

Hopeless Romantic is the fourth studio album by American singer-songwriter Michelle Branch. It was released on April 7, 2017, by Verve Records. Co-written and co-produced by Patrick Carney, the album is Branch's first release with Verve after leaving her previous label, Maverick Records, and having the original album material scrapped. Hopeless Romantic is also Branch's first full-length album to be released since Hotel Paper (2003), and first overall release since the Everything Comes and Goes EP in 2010.

The eponymous lead single from the album premiered on Billboard from her Vevo account on February 2, 2017, and was released digitally on February 3, 2017.

== Background ==
In early 2001, Branch signed with Maverick Records under Warner Bros. Records and released two highly successful studio albums, The Spirit Room and Hotel Paper, in August 2001 and June 2003, respectively. The Spirit Room was certified double platinum by the RIAA, selling more than 2.5 million copies, while Hotel Paper was certified Platinum by the RIAA. In 2002, Branch collaborated with Santana and recorded "The Game of Love", which earned both Santana and Branch a Grammy Award.

From 2004 to 2008, Branch formed a country duo with Jessica Harp called The Wreckers. Additionally, Branch announced that she was working on a new solo album titled Everything Comes and Goes that was slated for a June 2008 release, but due to personal and professional struggles it was delayed, and instead released as an EP in June 2010.

In 2011, Branch attempted a return to pop rock with the album West Coast Time, which also went unreleased due to restructuring within her record labels Reprise Records and Warner Bros. Records. In June 2011, she released ″Loud Music″ as the lead and only single from the then-upcoming release of The Loud Music Hits EP, which was released that August through Reprise Records. With the stressful factors of having two unreleased albums, contentions within her record label, the breakup of her country duo, motherhood and subsequent divorce, Branch was on the verge of officially quitting her music career.

In June 2015, however, Branch announced via Instagram that she had signed a new contract with Verve Records. Branch began dating Patrick Carney of The Black Keys that same year, and they co-wrote the album that would become Hopeless Romantic.

== Composition and development ==
According to Entertainment Weekly, Branch's current sound for the album is "laid-back rock & roll"; of her new-found sound, Branch said, "Patrick was like, 'This is your record, it has to sound like you'... It was the first time that someone pushed me to figure it all out on my own." The album's content is very personal, featuring songs about Branch's breakup with ex-husband Teddy Landau and about her new relationship with Patrick Carney.

== Promotion ==
To promote Hopeless Romantic, Branch performed at New York City's Bowery Electric, performing songs from the new album as well as her past hit "Are You Happy Now?". The album's lead single, "Hopeless Romantic", was released digitally on February 3, 2017. "Best You Ever" was released as the first promotional single from the album on March 3, 2017. "Fault Line" was released as the second promotional single from the album on March 31, 2017.

Promotional appearances in the media to support the album included a performance of "Best You Ever" on Good Morning America and Late Night with Seth Meyers on April 6, 2017.

== Critical reception ==
Professional ratings
Aggregate scores
Source	Rating
Metacritic	72/100
Review scores
Source	Rating
AllMusic	4/5 stars
Consequence of Sound	B
Contactmusic.com	3.5/5 stars
Entertainment Weekly	B
Mojo	3/5 stars
Paste	7.2/10
Uncut	3.5/5 stars

Hopeless Romantic received mostly positive reviews from music critics. At Metacritic, which assigns a normalized rating out of 100 to reviews from mainstream critics, the album has an average score of 72 out of 100, which indicates "generally favorable reviews" based on 7 reviews.

Stephen Thomas Erlewine of AllMusic rated the album four out of five stars, calls it "a new beginning on several different fronts", and writes, "it comes on so smoothly, it's easy to overlook how the songs quickly sink into the subconscious." Writing for Paste and rating the album 7.2 out of 10, Max Freedman states that on Hopeless Romantic, Branch "tells her story with enough variance to stay engaging." Entertainment Weekly's Madison Vain rated the album a "B", commenting, "Hopeless Romantic charts new ground, going beyond the simple math of adding the blues-rock percussionist and anthemic pop-rocker together."

=== Accolades ===
Publication	Rank	List
Billboard	32	50 Best Albums of 2017 So Far
Spin	41	50 Best Albums of 2017 So Far

== Track listing ==
All tracks produced by Patrick Carney and Gus Seyffert, except where noted.

Standard edition
No.	Title	Writer(s)	Length
1.	"Best You Ever"	Michelle Branch; Carney; Seyffert; Amy Kuney; Harlan Silverman	3:39
2.	"You're Good" (producers: Branch, Carney)	Branch; Carney; Kuney	3:10
3.	"Fault Line"	Branch; Carney; Seyffert; Morgan Kibby; Dan Nigro	3:55
4.	"Heartbreak Now"	Branch; Carney; Seyffert; Kuney; Bleu	4:12
5.	"Hopeless Romantic"	Branch; Carney; Seyffert; Kuney; Silverman	3:30
6.	"Living a Lie"	Branch; Carney; Seyffert	3:34
7.	"Knock Yourself Out"	Branch; Carney; Seyffert; Jennifer Decilveo; Garrett Lee	4:04
8.	"Temporary Feeling"	Branch; Carney; Seyffert; Kuney; Decilveo; Bram Inscore	3:34
9.	"Carry Me Home"	Branch; Carney; Seyffert; Kuney; Inscore	3:26
10.	"Not a Love Song"	Branch; Carney; Seyffert; Kuney; Drew Pearson	3:30
11.	"Last Night" (producers: Branch, Carney)	Branch; Carney; John Shanks	3:41
12.	"Bad Side"	Branch; Carney; Seyffert; Kuney; Pearson	3:57
13.	"Shadow"	Branch; Carney; Seyffert; Keith Jeffery; Michael Jeffery; Frederik Thaae	3:34
14.	"City"	Branch; Carney; Seyffert	4:35
Total length:			52:21

Japanese edition bonus track
No.	Title	Writer(s)	Length
15.	"Knock Yourself Out" (acoustic version)	Branch; Carney; Seyffert; Decilveo; Lee

== Personnel ==
Credits adapted from AllMusic.

Musicians

- Michelle Branch – vocals, keyboards, guitars, percussion
- Patrick Carney – keyboards, guitars, bass (2, 11), drums, percussion
- Gus Seyffert – keyboards, guitars, bass (1, 3–10, 12–14), percussion, backing vocals (5, 7)
- Jake Blanton – additional keyboards (3, 7–9), additional guitars (3, 7–9), backing vocals (7)
- John Wood – acoustic piano (9), additional synthesizers (9)
- Keith Jeffrey – harmony vocals (13), backing vocals (14)

=== Production ===
- Patrick Carney – producer
- Gus Seyffert – producer (1, 3–10, 12–14), recording
- Michelle Branch – producer (2, 11)
- Marc Whitmore – engineer (2, 11), mixing (2, 11)
- Tchad Blake – mixing (1, 3–10, 12–14)
- Dave Cerminara – assistant engineer
- Sean Cook – assistant engineer
- Dan Long – assistant engineer
- Hugo Nicolson – assistant engineer
- Brian Lucey – mastering at Magic Garden Mastering (Columbus, Ohio)
- Evelyn Morgan – A&R administration
- Tom Arndt – production manager
- Holly Adams – product manager
- Michael Carney – art direction, design
- Joshua Black Wilkins – photography
- Mike Bachta, Dirk Hemsath and Emily Hemsath with Working Group Artist Management – management

== Charts ==
Chart performance for Hopeless Romantic
Chart (2017)	Peak position
UK Album Downloads (OCC)	88
UK Americana Albums (OCC)	6
US Billboard 200	143
US Top Alternative Albums (Billboard)	18
US Top Rock Albums (Billboard)	24

== Release history ==
List of regions, release dates, formats, label and references
Region	Date	Format(s)	Label	Ref.
Japan	April 7, 2017	CD	Universal Music Japan	
Various	April 7, 2017	CD; LP; digital download	Verve	
