= Loud Music (song) =

Single by Michelle Branch

from the EP The Loud Music Hits EP
- Released: June 10, 2011
- Genre: Pop rock; rock
- Length: 3:23
- Label: Reprise
- Songwriters: Michelle Branch, Jim Irvin, Julian Emery
- Producers: Jim Irvin, Julian Emery

Michelle Branch singles chronology
"Sooner or Later" (2009)	"Loud Music" (2011)	"Hopeless Romantic" (2017)

Audio sample
- "Loud Music": file; help

"Loud Music" is a song recorded by American singer-songwriter Michelle Branch, which she co-wrote with the track's producers, Jim Irvin and Julian Emery. Originally intended as the lead single from an unreleased studio album, West Coast Time, the single was included on the eponymous The Loud Music Hits EP instead. "Loud Music" was officially released to digital retailers on June 10, 2011, through Reprise Records.

== Critical reception ==
Katherine St. Asaph of PopDust.com gave the song a 3.5 out of 5 and stated that "without the constant hard-rock callouts, 'Loud Music' is every bit as good as the rest of Branch's back catalogue". Amanda Hamsel of PopCrush gave it a 4 out of 5 rating, praising the song for its sound, and writing that it "is definitely the kind of song that sounds best, well, loud, with its '80s pop flavor and heavy-on-the-guitar back-track". Sarah Maloy of Billboard gave "Loud Music" a mixed review, praising the song's "strong beat, steady vocals and breezy melody," but criticized the production for "sometimes overshadow[ing]" Branch's voice and for being at odds with the song's lyrics.

== Chart performance ==
"Loud Music" debuted at No. 37 on the US Billboard Adult Top 40 chart for the week ending July 16, 2011. It peaked at No. 19, making the song her highest peaking single on the chart since 2003's "Breathe".

== Music video ==
An accompanying music video premiered August 11, 2011. The video follows two parallel storylines — one involving Branch taking a road trip with her friends and bandmates, and the other involving Branch's character falling in love with a blonde, "rocker dude" love interest.

== In popular culture ==
On October 31, 2011, days before the premiere of the seventh season of Bones, Fox Network released an Official Bones Music Video of "Loud Music". It features clips from past seasons and promotional jackets of the network's hit crime drama series. Cuts from Michelle Branch's Loud Music music video are also included. It ends with a clip from the upcoming season of the show.

The song's lyrics include references to Led Zeppelin and Jimi Hendrix and allusions to the Led Zeppelin song "Stairway to Heaven", the AC/DC song "You Shook Me All Night Long", The Rolling Stones and their song "Start Me Up", and turning an amplifier's volume "Up to eleven" as mentioned in the This Is Spinal Tap rockumentary. The song's music also briefly quotes the opening vocal riff in the Led Zeppelin song "Immigrant Song".

== Charts ==
Chart (2011)	Peak position
US Adult Pop Airplay (Billboard)	19
Japan Hot 100 (Billboard)	87
