= Arthur Burgess =

British painter

Arthur James Wetherall Burgess
- Born: 6 January 1879; Bombala, New South Wales, Australia
- Died: 16 April 1957 (aged 78); Hampstead, England
- Occupation: Painter

Arthur James Wetherall Burgess (6 January 1879 – 16 April 1957) a British painter. His main speciality was marine paintings.

Burgess was the son of James Ogle Burgess and Dinah Eleanor Evans. He was born at Bombala, New South Wales on 6 January 1879. He studied with the Australian artist W. Lister Lister, and began exhibiting in Australia in 1898. In 1901 he moved to England, where he was a student of artists at St Ives, Cornwall.

In 1904 he exhibited at the Royal Academy of Arts for the first time. By the next year he was settled in London and he rapidly established himself as a marine artist. In 1913 the Australian government commissioned paintings of cruisers. In 1917 he became an official Australian war artist, and he was again an official war artist during the Second World War. He was often commissioned to make paintings of ships by shipbuilders and shipping companies. He was art editor of The Naval Annual from 1922 to 1930. His work was part of the art competitions at the 1928 Summer Olympics and the 1932 Summer Olympics.

Burgess exhibited frequently at the Royal Academy of Arts and elsewhere. He was a founder member of the Society (now Royal Society) of Marine Artists and was its Vice-President at his death.

Burgess married Muriel Coldwell, another artist, in 1911. He died in London on 16 April 1957.
