= Hotel Paper =

Studio album by Michelle Branch

Studio album by Michelle Branch
- Released: June 24, 2003
- Studios: Henson Recording Studios, Ocean Way Recording and Cello Studios (Hollywood, California); NRG Studios and Larrabee North (North Hollywood, California); Rocket Carousel Studio (Culver City, California); Image Recording Studios and Westlake Audio (Los Angeles, California); The Big Space (Santa Monica, California); Fantasy Studios (Berkeley, California); Noise New York (New York City, New York); Seventeen Grand Recording (Nashville, Tennessee)
- Genres: Alternative rock; pop rock
- Length: 47:05
- Label: Maverick
- Producers: Josh Abraham; Rick Depofi; John Leventhal; John Shanks; Greg Wells

Michelle Branch chronology
The Spirit Room (2001)	Hotel Paper (2003)	Everything Comes and Goes (2010)

Singles from Hotel Paper
- 1. "Are You Happy Now?" Released: May 19, 2003; 2. "Breathe" Released: September 22, 2003; 3. "'Til I Get Over You" Released: February 9, 2004

Hotel Paper is the third studio album by American singer-songwriter Michelle Branch. It was released on June 24, 2003, through Maverick Records. The production on the album was handled by a variety of record producers such as Josh Abraham, Rick Depofi, John Leventhal, John Shanks & Greg Wells.

Hotel Paper was supported by three singles: "Are You Happy Now?", "Breathe" and "'Til I Get Over You". The album received mixed critical reviews and debuted at number two on the US Billboard 200, selling 157,000 copies in its first week. The album was certified platinum by the Recording Industry Association of America (RIAA) in December 2003.

== Background ==
Major themes on Hotel Paper include leaving things behind, constantly being on the move, independence, the mysteries of bus stations, and spirituality. The album's cover is a photograph of Branch by Sheryl Nields.

== Singles ==
"Are You Happy Now?", the album's first single, peaked at number 16 on the US Billboard Hot 100. It was nominated for a Grammy Award for Best Female Rock Vocal Performance, Branch's third nomination. The second single was "Breathe", which reached number 36 on the Hot 100 and became a top five club hit. A third single, "'Til I Get over You", was released with no music video and failed to chart.

== Critical reception ==
Professional ratings
Aggregate scores
Source	Rating
Metacritic	57/100
Review scores
Source	Rating
AllMusic	3/5 stars
Entertainment Weekly	C
Los Angeles Times	2/4 stars
Now	2/5 Ns
Q	3/5 stars
Rolling Stone	2/5 stars
Slant Magazine	2.5/5 stars
Stylus Magazine	C−
Spin	6/10
Yahoo! Music UK	6/10 stars

Hotel Paper earned mixed reviews. At Metacritic, which assigns a normalized rating out of 100 to reviews from mainstream publications, the album received an average score of 57, based on ten reviews. Alex Pappademas, writing for Spin, praised Branch for "sticking to [her] folk-rock guns on Hotel Paper, which boasts road-toughened guitars and a welcome accusatory edge." Similarly, Dan Aquilante from The New York Post observed that "There's an undercurrent of anger on this record that Branch manages to channel and transform into rock intensity." Steve Hochman of the Los Angeles Times described Hotel Paper as "state-of-the-art pop" but criticized Branch's songwriting: "The only thing [she] sings about is dating problems, and she does so in generic terms [...] Branch has experienced a big, wide world out there in the last couple of years. Too bad it's not reflected in her songs." Meanwhile, Rolling Stone editor Rob Sheffield called the album "your basic second-album material" but noted that Branch "is determined to mature and... has the talent to become the long-term pop pro she clearly wants to be — it's just a matter of working on her craft until it matches her drive."

AllMusic editor Stephen Thomas Erlewine offered a more critical perspective, stating that "Branch remains appealing — her blend of pop and mild roots rock sounds good and she has a nice, plainspoken charm and straight-ahead voice — but she's buried beneath the slick veneer of Hotel Paper's production and does not help herself with her compositions, which are vaguely ingratiating, but rarely rise above the generic level." Todd Burns of Stylus Magazine was even less impressed, writing that the album "treads the line between rushed brilliance and rushed dross. Much of the second half of the album is significantly less strong than the first half [...] Sure, there are moments of brilliance on the second half, but not sustained brilliance." Finally, Sarah Liss from Now was harshest, arguing that "Branch's glossy guitar pop is fairly devoid of character. On her sophomore album the girl proves she's a decent belter, eschewing the drama-heavy affectations of her peers, and can write a tune. Problem is, most of the 13 tracks here sound identical."

== Commercial performance ==
Hotel Paper debuted at number two on US Billboard 200 chart, selling 157,000 copies in its first week. This became Branch's first US top-ten debut and highest first-week sales to date. In its second week, the album dropped to number four on the chart, selling an additional 85,000 copies. In its third week, the album dropped to number six on the chart, selling 65,000 more copies. The album spent a total of 33 weeks on the US Billboard 200 chart. On December 9, 2003, the album was certified platinum by the Recording Industry Association of America (RIAA) for shipments of over a million copies. As of March 2009, the album had sold 1,116,000 copies in the United States.

In Canada, the album peaked at number four on the Canadian Album Chart; it was certified gold for shipments of over 50,000 copies.

== Track listing ==
All tracks are written by Michelle Branch, except where noted.

No.	Title	Writer(s)	Length
1.	"Intro"		0:12
2.	"Are You Happy Now?"	Branch; John Shanks	3:50
3.	"Find Your Way Back"		3:45
4.	"Empty Handed"		4:50
5.	"Tuesday Morning"		4:43
6.	"One of These Days"		3:23
7.	"Love Me Like That" (with Sheryl Crow)	Branch; Shanks	4:35
8.	"Desperately"		3:06
9.	"Breathe"	Branch; Shanks	3:32
10.	"Where Are You Now?"		3:26
11.	"Hotel Paper"		4:19
12.	"'Til I Get Over You"	Branch; Shanks	4:10
13.	"It's You" (Outro begins at 2:30)		3:14

International edition bonus tracks
No.	Title	Writer(s)	Length
13.	"Everywhere"	Branch; Shanks	3:36
14.	"The Game of Love" (with Santana)	Alex Ander; Rick Nowels	4:15
15.	"It's You"		3:14

Digital deluxe edition bonus tracks
No.	Title	Writer(s)	Length
13.	"It's You" (Outro excluded)		2:29
14.	"Wanting Out"		3:48
15.	"Lay Me Down"	Branch; Jessica Harp; Greg Wells	3:14
16.	"A Case of You"	Joni Mitchell	4:15
17.	"'Til I Get Over You" (Acoustic live from AOL Sessions)	Branch; Shanks	4:06

iTunes Store deluxe edition bonus videos
No.	Title	Length
18.	"Are You Happy Now?" (Music video)	4:02
19.	"Breathe" (Music video)	3:32

== Personnel ==
Performers and musicians

- Michelle Branch – vocals, acoustic guitar (3–5), guitars (8, 10, 13), percussion (10), keyboards (13), backing vocals (14)
- Jamie Muhoberac – keyboards (1–3, 9)
- Patrick Warren – keyboards (4, 5, 7, 9, 12, 13)
- Josh Abraham – keyboards (6), programming (6)
- Oliver Goldstein – acoustic piano (6), keyboards (6), programming (6)
- Greg Wells – acoustic piano (8, 10), organ (8, 10), guitars (8), bass (8),Wurlitzer electric piano (10)
- John Leventhal – keyboards (11), guitars (11), bass (11)
- Lars Fox – programming (13)
- Rick Nowels – keyboards (14), acoustic guitar (14), backing vocals (14)
- Chester D. Thompson – acoustic piano (14), organ (14)
- Dave Navarro – guitars (2)
- John Shanks – guitars (2–5, 7, 9, 12, 13), bass (3, 9, 13), programming (13)
- Stuart Smith – mandolin (7)
- Carlos Santana – electric lead guitar (14), horn arrangements (14)
- Rusty Anderson – additional electric guitar (14)
- Paul Bushnell – bass (2)
- Chris Chaney – bass (4, 5, 7, 9, 12)
- Mike Elizondo – bass (9)
- Dan Rothchild – bass (10)
- Benny Rietveld – bass (14)
- Kenny Aronoff – drums (2–5, 7, 9, 12, 13)
- Brian MacLeod – drums (8, 10)
- Shawn Pelton – drums (11)
- Vinnie Colaiuta – drums (13)
- Brian Collier – drums (14)
- Wayne Rodrigues – drum programming (14)
- Luis Conte – percussion (8), additional percussion (14)
- Chris Reynolds – percussion (10)
- Rick Depofi – percussion (11)
- Karl Perazzo – percussion (14)
- Raul Rekow – congas (14)
- Jeff Cressman – trombone (14), horn arrangements (14)
- Marty Wehner – trombone (14)
- Julius Melendez – trumpet (14)
- Bill Ortiz – trumpet (14), horn arrangements (14)
- David Campbell – string arrangements (4)
- Sheryl Crow – vocals (7)
- Jessica Harp – backing vocals (8)
- Siedah Garrett – backing vocals (14)
- Niki Haris – backing vocals (14)
- Tony Lindsay – additional vocals (14)
- Andy Vargas – additional vocals (14)

Technical

- Danny Strick – A&R
- John Shanks – producer (1–5, 7, 9, 12, 13)
- Josh Abraham – producer (6), mixing (6)
- Greg Wells – producer (8, 10)
- John Leventhal – producer (11, 15)
- Rick Depofi – co-producer (11), engineer (11)
- Alex Anders – producer (14)
- Rick Nowels – producer (14)
- Dan Chase – recording (2–5, 7, 9, 12)
- Marc DeSisto – recording (2–5, 7, 9, 12, 13)
- Lars Fox – recording (2–5, 7, 9, 12, 13), Pro Tools editing (13)
- Jeff Rothschild – recording (2–5, 7, 9, 12)
- Ryan Williams – engineer (6)
- Brian Scheuble – engineer (8, 10)
- Greg Collins – engineer (14)
- Chris Garcia – engineer (14)
- Jim Gaines – engineer (14)
- Michael Rosen – engineer (14)
- Randy Wine – engineer (14)
- Brian Humphrey – assistant engineer (2–5, 7, 9, 12)
- Eric Reichers – assistant engineer (2–5, 7, 9, 12)
- Mark Valentine – assistant engineer (2–5, 7, 9, 12)
- Mark J. Ciccula – assistant engineer (6)
- Chris Reynolds – second engineer (8, 10)
- Jorge Velez – assistant engineer (11)
- Ben Conrad – assistant engineer (14)
- Scott Holderby – assistant engineer (14)
- Kieron Menzies – assistant engineer (14)
- Alec Veucasovic – assistant engineer (14)
- Chris Lord-Alge – mixing (2–5, 7, 9, 12, 13)
- Jim Scott – mixing (8, 10)
- Roger Moutenot – mixing (11)
- Manny Marroquin – mixing (14)
- Jesse Gorman – mix assistant (6)
- Chris Holmes – mix assistant (10)
- Rob Clark – mix assistant (11)
- Josh "Tone" Weaver – Pro Tools editing (14)
- Brian Gardner – mastering at Bernie Grundman Mastering (Hollywood, California)
- Jill Dell'Abate – production coordinator (11)
- Robert Cappadona – project coordinator (14)
- Kirsten Johnson – project coordinator (14)
- Frank "Flem" Maddocks – art direction, design
- Sheryl Nields – photography
- Jeff Rabhan – management

== Charts ==
=== Weekly charts ===
Weekly chart performance for Hotel Paper
Chart (2003)	Peak position
Australian Albums (ARIA)	18
Canadian Albums (Billboard)	4
French Albums (SNEP)	79
German Albums (Offizielle Top 100)	43
Irish Albums (IRMA)	53
Japanese Albums (Oricon)	8
New Zealand Albums (RMNZ)	4
Swiss Albums (Schweizer Hitparade)	34
UK Albums (Official Charts)	35
US Billboard 200	2

=== Year-end charts ===
Year-end chart performance for Hotel Paper
Chart (2003)	Position
US Billboard 200	86

== Certifications ==
Certifications for Hotel Paper
Region	Certification	Certified units/sales
Australia (ARIA)	Gold	35,000^{^}
Canada (Music Canada)	Gold	50,000^{^}
Japan (RIAJ)	Gold	100,000^{^}
United States (RIAA)	Platinum	1,000,000^{^}
^{^} Shipments figures based on certification alone.
