= Are You Happy Now? =

2003 single by Michelle Branch

Single by Michelle Branch

from the album Hotel Paper
- B-side: "Wanting Out"; "Hotel Paper" (acoustic live)
- Released: May 19, 2003
- Genre: Alternative rock; post-grunge
- Length: 3:49 (album version); 4:03 (video version)
- Label: Maverick; Warner Australia
- Songwriters: Michelle Branch; John Shanks
- Producer: John Shanks

Michelle Branch singles chronology
"The Game of Love" (2002)	"Are You Happy Now?" (2003)	"Breathe" (2003)

Music video
- "Are You Happy Now?" on YouTube

"Are You Happy Now?" is a song by American singer Michelle Branch, released as the lead single from her second studio album, Hotel Paper (2003), on May 19, 2003. The single contains a non-album single called "Wanting Out" and a live acoustic version of the song "Hotel Paper" as its B-sides.

Written by Michelle Branch and John Shanks, "Are You Happy Now?" peaked at number 16 on the US Billboard Hot 100 and is Branch's highest-charting solo single on the Billboard Adult Top 40 chart, peaking at number three. Worldwide, the song reached the top 20 in New Zealand and the top 40 in Australia and the United Kingdom. It was nominated for the Grammy Award for Best Female Rock Vocal Performance, losing out to Pink's "Trouble".

== Chart performance ==
"Are You Happy Now?" debuted at number 91 on the US Billboard Hot 100 on the week ending May 31, 2003. It entered the top 40 three weeks later, marking Branch's fifth consecutive top-40 hit. The song rose to the top 20 during its 10th week on the chart and peaked at number 16 on the week dated August 16, 2003. It spent a total of 20 weeks on the Hot 100. On other Billboard charts, it peaked at number four on the Mainstream Top 40 and number three on the Adult Top 40 charts, respectively, marking Branch's fourth top-10 hit on the former and her fifth top-10 hit on the latter.

"Are You Happy Now?" also charted worldwide. It peaked at number 31 on the UK Singles Chart, marking Branch's fourth top-40 hit in the United Kingdom. The track peaked at number 81 in France, becoming Branch's second entry on the chart, after "Everywhere" reached number 60 a year prior. It spent a sole week at number 49 on the FIMI singles chart in Italy. In Australia, the song entered at number 41 on the week ending June 29, 2003, and spent four weeks on the chart initially. It then re-entered at number 39 four weeks later and peaked at number 33 the week after; it spent a total of nine non-consecutive weeks on the ARIA Singles Chart. Its best performance outside the US came in New Zealand, where it became Branch's fourth top-20 hit by peaking at number 16 and remaining on the chart for 14 weeks.

== Track listings ==
European and Australian CD single

1. "Are You Happy Now?" – 3:49
2. "Wanting Out" – 3:48
3. "Hotel Paper" (acoustic live) – 4:21

UK CD single

1. "Are You Happy Now?" – 3:49
2. "Wanting Out" – 3:48
3. "Hotel Paper" (acoustic live) – 4:21
4. "Are You Happy Now?" (video) – 3:49

== Charts ==
=== Weekly charts ===
Chart (2003)	Peak position
Australia (ARIA)	33
Belgium (Ultratip Bubbling Under Flanders)	4
Europe (Eurochart Hot 100)	99
France (SNEP)	81
Italy (FIMI)	49
New Zealand (Recorded Music NZ)	16
Scotland (OCC)	29
UK Singles (OCC)	31
US Billboard Hot 100	16
US Adult Pop Airplay (Billboard)	3
US Pop Airplay (Billboard)	4

=== Year-end charts ===
Chart (2003)	Position
US Billboard Hot 100	56
US Adult Top 40 (Billboard)	14
US Mainstream Top 40 (Billboard)	23

== Release history ==
Region	Date	Format(s)	Label(s)	Ref.
United States	May 19, 2003	Contemporary hit; hot adult contemporary radio	Maverick	
Australia	June 16, 2003	CD	Maverick; Warner Music Australia	
United Kingdom	June 30, 2003	CD	Maverick	

== "Wanting Out" ==
Despite not having an official single release, one of the single's B-sides, "Wanting Out", was released to digital media outlets in 2003 and charted on the Billboard Hot Digital Tracks chart. However, since digital downloads were not being tallied for the Billboard Hot 100 at the time, the song did not appear on the latter chart.

=== Charts ===
Chart (2003)	Peak position
US Hot Digital Tracks (Billboard)	4
