= The Spirit Room =

Studio album by Michelle Branch
- Released: August 14, 2001
- Studios: Ananda, Sunset Sound, Henson (Hollywood, California)
- Genres: Alternative rock; pop rock
- Length: 42:26
- Labels: Maverick; Warner Bros.
- Producer: John Shanks

Michelle Branch chronology
| Broken Bracelet (2000) | The Spirit Room (2001) | Hotel Paper (2003) |

Alternative cover
- Limited edition international cover

Singles from The Spirit Room
- 1. "Everywhere" Released: June 11, 2001; 2. "All You Wanted" Released: January 7, 2002; 3. "Goodbye to You" Released: July 8, 2002

The Spirit Room is the second studio album and major-label debut by American singer-songwriter Michelle Branch. It was released by the Maverick Recording Company and Warner Bros. Records in the United States on August 14, 2001. The album was recorded at Sunset Sound, Henson Recording Studios and Ananda Studios in Hollywood, California and mastered by Stephen Marcussen at Marcussen Mastering in Los Angeles, California. Its title was inspired by a bar in Jerome, Arizona, near Branch's hometown of Sedona.

The album received generally positive critical reception, with reviewers praising Branch's songwriting, vocals, lyrical directness, and accessible pop-rock sound, although some criticized her vocal distinctiveness, production, and songwriting originality. Commercially, The Spirit Room became Branch's biggest success, selling 3 million copies worldwide, spending 86 weeks on the Billboard 200, and earning a 2× Platinum certification in the United States. Its success was boosted by hit singles, including "Everywhere," "All You Wanted," and "Goodbye to You," which reached numbers 12, 6, and 21 on the Billboard Hot 100, respectively.

== Background ==
Before The Spirit Room, Michelle Branch established herself as a singer-songwriter through local performances and independent recordings. Her parents supported her musical interests by helping her book performances in Sedona and financing her debut album, Broken Bracelet. Her early set lists included covers of songs by artists such as Sheryl Crow, Lisa Loeb, Jewel, and Fleetwood Mac, alongside her own compositions. In December 1999, Branch uploaded two original songs to the Rolling Stone website, which attracted the attention of pop-rock band Hanson and producer Jeff Rabhan. The exposure led to Branch opening for Hanson at two concerts in 2000, followed by the release of her debut album later that year, through Twin Dragon Records. In 2001, Branch signed with Maverick Records and began working with producer John Shanks on her major-label debut.

== Artwork and title ==
The album's title comes from the name of a bar in Jerome, Arizona, near Branch's hometown of Sedona. The album cover was shot in an industrial area across from an electrical substation in Los Angeles, California alongside the Los Angeles River facing north-west at the skyline during sunset.

== Critical reception ==
Professional ratings
Review scores
| Source | Rating |
|---|---|
| AllMusic | 4/5 stars |
| Entertainment Weekly | B |
| The Guardian | 3/5 stars |
| New York Post | 2.5/4 stars |
| Q | 4/5 stars |
| The Village Voice | C |

AllMusic's Liana Jonas praised The Spirit Room as a "worthy pop/rock debut," highlighting Branch's "substantial vocal presence" and emotionally open songwriting. She particularly praised "Everywhere" for its infectious sound and called "Drop in the Ocean" the album's "most captivating moment." Rolling Stone's John D. Luerssen called the album an "impressive entrance," praising Branch's songwriting, conviction, and distinctive voice. He noted that the album appealed to listeners "disillusioned by the vapid teen pop scene," despite its occasionally "dated, canned drum production." Caroline Sullivan from The Guardian praised Branch's "lyrical directness" and "sure hand with memorable melodies," particularly on "Here with Me" and "Everywhere." She ultimately described The Spirit Room as "a promising start," while comparing Branch favorably with Alanis Morissette and Dido. The New York Post's Dan Aquilante praised the album for its "heartfelt, intelligent lyrics about love and growing up" and Branch's strong songwriting. However, he found her voice "very standard," noting that she stood out most on "Sweet Misery" and "Drop in the Ocean." Robert Christgau was sharply critical of The Spirit Room, giving it a C and dismissing the marketing of Branch as "the anti-Britney." He questioned the originality of her songwriting, arguing that her hit material was co-written with producer John Shanks.

== Commercial performance ==
With 3 million copies sold worldwide, The Spirit Room became Branch's best-selling album and established her as a major commercial success of the early 2000s. With 3 million copies sold worldwide, The Spirit Room remains Branch's best-selling album. In the United States, the album debuted at number 28 on the Billboard 200, selling 68,000 copies in its first week. It went on to spend 86 weeks on the chart, making it Branch's longest-charting album in the United States. By July 2003, it had sold 1.8 million copies domestically, and on August 19, 2011, it was certified 2× Platinum by the RIAA for shipments exceeding two million copies.

The album also achieved success internationally, particularly in Japan, where it peaked at number 12 and was certified Platinum for 200,000 units. It also reached number 25 in Australia, 33 in New Zealand, 45 in Switzerland, 54 in the United Kingdom, 75 in Germany, 89 in the Netherlands, and 120 in France. In Canada, although The Spirit Room did not appear on the chart, the album was certified gold, selling 50,000 copies in October 2003. In Australia, it was also certified gold with shipments of 35,000. It also was certified Silver in the United Kingdom, with 60,000 certified units or sales/streams respectively.

== Legacy ==
In 2021, Branch revealed that Taylor Swift had told her The Spirit Room had been a major influence on her own music. The same year, Branch decided to celebrate its anniversary by re-recording the album and pressing it on vinyl for the first time. On September 10, 2021, she performed the album in its entirety during a special virtual concert. An afterparty and Q&A session followed.

== Track listing ==
All tracks are written by Michelle Branch, with additional co-writers as noted; except for "Life on Mars", which was written by David Bowie.

The Spirit Room track listing
| No. | Title | Writer(s) | Length |
|---|---|---|---|
| 1. | "Everywhere" | John Shanks; Matt Bronleewe; Tiffany Arbuckle Lee | 3:36 |
| 2. | "You Get Me" | Abra Moore; Shelly Peiken; Shanks | 3:53 |
| 3. | "All You Wanted" | | 3:38 |
| 4. | "You Set Me Free" | Shanks | 3:11 |
| 5. | "Something to Sleep To" | Jennifer Hagio; Shanks | 4:15 |
| 6. | "Here with Me" | Shanks | 3:26 |
| 7. | "Sweet Misery" | | 3:43 |
| 8. | "If Only She Knew" | | 4:19 |
| 9. | "I'd Rather Be in Love" | | 3:55 |
| 10. | "Goodbye to You" | | 4:12 |
| 11. | "Drop in the Ocean" | Hagio; Will Golden; Bernie Reilly | 4:19 |
| Total length: | | | 42:26 |

North American digital deluxe edition
| No. | Title | Writer(s) | Length |
|---|---|---|---|
| 12. | "Life on Mars" | | 3:42 |
| 13. | "All You Wanted" (unplugged) | | 3:34 |
| 14. | "Everywhere" (acoustic) | Shanks | 3:34 |

iTunes Store deluxe edition
| No. | Title | Writer(s) | Length |
|---|---|---|---|
| 12. | "Life on Mars" | | 3:42 |
| 13. | "Goodbye to You" (unplugged) | | 4:10 |
| 14. | "All You Wanted" (unplugged) | | 3:34 |
| 15. | "Everywhere" (acoustic) | Shanks | 3:34 |
| 16. | "Goodbye to You" (music video) | | 3:56 |
| 17. | "All You Wanted" (music video) | | 3:40 |
| 18. | "Everywhere" (music video) | | 3:33 |

20th anniversary re-recorded release
| No. | Title | Writer(s) | Length |
|---|---|---|---|
| 12. | "Paper Pieces" | | 3:38 |
| 13. | "Everywhere" (alternate version) | Shanks | 4:26 |

== Singles ==
- "Everywhere" – July 17, 2001
- "All You Wanted" – October 28, 2001
- "Goodbye to You" – September 9, 2002

== Personnel ==
=== Musicians ===
- Michelle Branch – all vocals, keyboards, guitars
- John Shanks – keyboards, programming, guitars, bass
- Patrick Warren – keyboards
- Lars Fox – programming
- Kenny Aronoff – drums
- Vinnie Colaiuta – drums

=== Production ===
- Danny Strick – A&R
- John Shanks – producer
- Marc DeSisto – engineer, mixing (6, 8–11)
- Lars Fox – engineer, Pro Tools editing
- Steve Kaplan – assistant engineer
- Monique Mizrahi – assistant engineer
- Tom Nellen – assistant engineer
- Jason Rankins – assistant engineer
- Chris Reynolds – assistant engineer
- Jason Schweitzer – assistant engineer
- Jamie Sickora – assistant engineer
- Chris Lord-Alge – mixing (1, 3, 4)
- Dave Way – mixing (2, 5, 7)
- Stephen Marcussen – mastering at Marcussen Mastering (Hollywood, California)
- Robert Cappadona – production coordination
- Shari Sutcliffe – production coordination
- Kim Biggs – art direction
- David Harlan – art direction
- Shoshannah Day Strauss – design
- Matthew Welch – photography

Enhanced CD credits

- Holly Adams – producer
- Nick Spanos – producer
- Jeremy Welt – producer
- Mike Donk – creation

== Use in media ==
- "Goodbye to You" was performed live by Michelle Branch on the season 6 episode "Tabula Rasa" of Buffy the Vampire Slayer.
- "Goodbye to You" was also performed live on the season 5 episode "Centennial Charmed" of Charmed.
- "You Get Me" became the theme song for the MTV reality series Sorority Life.
- "You Get Me" is featured in the films What a Girl Wants, The Hot Chick, and Van Wilder.
- "You Set Me Free" was featured in the following films:
  - The trailer for the 2004 film Against the Ropes.
  - The trailer of DreamWorks Animation's Spirit: Stallion of the Cimarron.
  - Towards the closing credits of the 2003 film Just Married.
  - In the 2005 film Ice Princess, and it is featured on the movie's soundtrack.
- "Everywhere" is featured in the 2001 film American Pie 2 and is on the film's soundtrack.
- "Everywhere" is featured on the season 2 episode "T3STDRV" of Twisted Metal.

== Charts ==
=== Weekly charts ===
Weekly chart performance for The Spirit Room
| Chart (2001–2002) | Peak position |
|---|---|
| Australian Albums (ARIA) | 25 |
| Dutch Albums (Album Top 100) | 89 |
| French Albums (SNEP) | 120 |
| German Albums (Offizielle Top 100) | 75 |
| Japanese Albums (Oricon) | 12 |
| New Zealand Albums (RMNZ) | 33 |
| Swiss Albums (Schweizer Hitparade) | 45 |
| UK Albums (Official Charts) | 54 |
| US Billboard 200 | 28 |

=== Year-end charts ===
2002 year-end chart performance for The Spirit Room
| Chart (2002) | Position |
|---|---|
| Canadian Albums (Nielsen SoundScan) | 185 |
| US Billboard 200 | 52 |

2003 year-end chart performance for The Spirit Room
| Chart (2003) | Position |
|---|---|
| US Billboard 200 | 184 |

== Certifications ==
Certifications for The Spirit Room
| Region | Certification | Certified units/sales |
|---|---|---|
| Australia (ARIA) | Gold | 35,000^{^} |
| Canada (Music Canada) | Gold | 50,000^{^} |
| Japan (RIAJ) | Platinum | 200,000^{^} |
| United Kingdom (BPI) | Silver | 60,000^{‡} |
| United States (RIAA) | 2× Platinum | 2,000,000^{^} |
^{^} Shipments figures based on certification alone.^{‡} Sales+streaming figures based on certification alone.
