= All You Wanted =

2002 single by Michelle Branch

Single by Michelle Branch

from the album The Spirit Room
- Released: January 7, 2002
- Studio: Sunset Sound; Henson; Ananda (Hollywood, California)
- Genre: Alternative rock
- Length: 3:37
- Label: Maverick
- Songwriter: Michelle Branch
- Producer: John Shanks

Michelle Branch singles chronology
"Everywhere" (2001)	"All You Wanted" (2002)	"Goodbye to You" (2002)

"All You Wanted" is a song by American singer-songwriter Michelle Branch, released as the second single from her debut album, The Spirit Room (2001). Written by Branch and produced by John Shanks, the song was released in the United States by Maverick Records on January 7, 2002.

"All You Wanted" received generally positive reviews and became Branch's first top-10 hit in the United States, reaching number six on the Billboard Hot 100. The song also entered the top 10 in New Zealand, reaching number three on the RIANZ Singles Chart, and in Canada, reaching number 10 on Nielsen BDS's CHR chart. Elsewhere, "All You Wanted" underperformed in Europe and stalled inside the top 30 in Australia.

== Background and composition ==
"All You Wanted" was written by Branch and produced by John Shanks. The song is written in the key of A-flat major with a tempo of 96 beats per minute. Lyrically, it talks about a heartbreak. Branch said of the song, "I feel like everybody wants to find someone who you feel understood by and will be there to catch you when you fall, and that's what 'All You Wanted' is about."

== Critical reception ==
"All You Wanted" received mostly positive reviews from music critics. In 2009, Sputnikmusic said that the song was the most recognizable while reviewing Branch's The Spirit Room album. Jeff C of Popdirt called the track amazing while reviewing The Spirit Room in 2002. In December 2005, Pam Avoledo embraced the song, she called it "a teen fairytale worth believing in."

Hot Sauce Reviews called "All You Wanted" a favorite and that its one of the tracks that were "listenable, tuneful, and they are great for singalongs too". In 2003, IGN Music stated that "The lyrics, while not the deepest, are not simple or cheesy by any means." They added that "The song features some nice guitar work and again, an insanely catchy chorus." British online newspaper The Independent referred to the track as an "anthemic head rush".

== Chart performance ==
"All You Wanted" entered the US Billboard Hot 100 on the week ending February 23, 2002, and stayed on the charts for 28 weeks, peaking at number six on May 25. The song became Branch's first top-10 hit, as well as her second-highest-peaking single, after "The Game of Love" (2003). The song also reached number two on the Billboard Mainstream Top 40 chart, Branch's biggest hit on that chart.

== Music video ==
The music video was directed by Liz Friedlander. It begins with Branch entering a club where her boyfriend is. During the chorus, everything around her freezes, and she takes the opportunity to sing at him, "If you want to, I can save you, I can take you away from here..." assuming he cannot hear her. They then go on a bus together, she sits down, assuming he will sit next to her, but he runs into friends and ignores her. She again sings at him during the chorus. After they exit the bus, it begins to rain and her surroundings are again frozen, and she sings at him, but she then notices that her boyfriend's watch is still ticking. When she realizes this, her boyfriend looks at her, the rain is still stopped. She realizes he was able to hear everything she said before the rain begins to pour again, and she runs away.

In 2002, the video was nominated on MTV Video Music Awards in two categories: Best Female Video and Best Pop Video.

== Track listings ==
UK CD single

1. "All You Wanted" – 3:38
2. "Everywhere" (acoustic version) – 3:32
3. "If Only She Knew" – 4:19
4. "All You Wanted" (video)

German CD single

1. "All You Wanted" – 3:38
2. "Everywhere" (acoustic version) – 3:32

Australian CD single

1. "All You Wanted" – 3:38
2. "Everywhere" (acoustic version) – 3:32
3. "If Only She Knew" – 4:19

Japanese CD single – "All You Wanted" / "Everywhere"

1. "All You Wanted" – 3:38
2. "Everywhere" – 3:36
3. "Goodbye to You" (unplugged version) – 4:09

== Credits and personnel ==
Credits are lifted from The Spirit Room album booklet.

Studios

- Recorded at Sunset Sound, Henson Recording Studios, and Ananda Studios (Hollywood, California)
- Mixed at Image Recorders (Hollywood, California)
- Mastered at Marcussen Mastering (Los Angeles)

Personnel

- Michelle Branch – writing, guitars, keyboards
- John Shanks – guitars, bass, keyboards, programming, production
- Patrick Warren – keyboards
- Kenny Aronoff – drums
- Vinnie Colaiuta – drums
- Lars Fox – programming, engineering, Pro Tools editing
- Chris Lord-Alge – mixing
- Marc DeSisto – engineering
- Stephen Marcussen – mastering

== Charts ==
=== Weekly charts ===
Weekly chart performance for "All You Wanted"
Chart (2001–2002)	Peak position
Australia (ARIA)	25
Belgium (Ultratip Bubbling Under Flanders)	13
Canada CHR (Nielsen BDS)	10
Europe (Eurochart Hot 100)	88
Germany (GfK)	91
Italy (FIMI)	42
Netherlands (Dutch Top 40 Tipparade)	5
Netherlands (Single Top 100)	84
New Zealand (Recorded Music NZ)	3
Scotland Singles (Official Charts)	29
UK Singles (Official Charts)	33
US Billboard Hot 100	6
US Adult Contemporary (Billboard)	30
US Adult Pop Airplay (Billboard)	4
US Pop Airplay (Billboard)	2

=== Year-end charts ===
Year-end chart performance for "All You Wanted"
Chart (2002)	Position
Australia (ARIA)	92
Canada Radio (Nielsen BDS)	37
New Zealand (RIANZ)	47
US Billboard Hot 100	23
US Adult Top 40 (Billboard)	13
US Mainstream Top 40 (Billboard)	11

== Release history ==
Release dates and formats for "All You Wanted"
Region	Date	Format(s)	Label(s)	Ref.
United States	January 7, 2002	Contemporary hit; adult contemporary; hot AC radio	Maverick	
Japan	January 23, 2002	CD with "Everywhere"	Warner Music Japan	
Australia	April 15, 2002	CD	Maverick; Warner Music Australia	
United Kingdom	July 22, 2002	CD; cassette	Maverick	

== Covers and media usage ==
- "All You Wanted" was covered by Deamons Art in 2021 from the album Rain Days.
- Taylor Swift grew up a fan of Branch and has covered "All You Wanted" during concerts.
