= 2002 MTV Video Music Awards =

Music awards ceremony in New York City

- Date: Thursday, 8:00 p.m. (EST), August 29, 2002
- Location: Radio City Music Hall, New York City, New York
- Country: United States
- Hosted by: Jimmy Fallon
- Most awards: Eminem (4)
- Most nominations: Shakira (7)

Television/radio coverage
- Network: MTV
- Produced by: Alex Coletti; Salli Frattini; Dave Sirulnick
- Directed by: Beth McCarthy-Miller

The 2002 MTV Video Music Awards aired live on August 29, 2002, honoring the best music videos from June 9, 2001, to May 31, 2002. The show was hosted by Jimmy Fallon at Radio City Music Hall in New York City. During the show, Michael Jackson accepted a birthday statue in hands of Britney Spears, which he believed to be an "Artist of the Millennium Award" due to a misunderstanding after which he joined her to present the Best Pop Video Award. Performers included Eminem, who won four awards including Video of the Year, and Guns N' Roses. The show also saw the debut solo performance from Justin Timberlake, performing his soon to be hit single "Like I Love You" alongside rap duo Clipse. TLC members Tionne "T-Boz" Watkins and Rozonda "Chili" Thomas appeared, paying tribute to their fallen member Lisa "Left Eye" Lopes, who died in a car accident in Honduras on April 25, 2002, four months before the event.

== Background ==
MTV announced on May 1 that the 2002 Video Music Awards would be held on August 29 at Radio City Music Hall. The departure from the ceremony's traditional September scheduling was made to avoid a conflict with the first anniversary of the September 11 attacks, and the VMAs have alternated between August and September dates since this ceremony. Nominees were announced on July 22, and Jimmy Fallon was announced as host on the same date. The ceremony broadcast was preceded by the 2002 MTV Video Music Awards Opening Act. Hosted by Kurt Loder and SuChin Pak with reports from John Norris, Iann Robinson, Sway, Gideon Yago, and Nick Zano, the broadcast featured red carpet interviews, pre-taped reports on The Hives versus The Vines and P. Diddy, and performances from Avril Lavigne and Ludacris. The broadcast marked the first live awards ceremony to be filmed in the 24p digital format as MTV prepared to broadcast in high-definition for future ceremonies.

== Performances ==
List of musical performances
Artist(s)	Song(s)
Pre-show
Avril Lavigne	"Complicated" "Sk8er Boi"
Ludacris; I-20; Shawnna	"Rollout (My Business)" "Move Bitch"
Main show
Bruce Springsteen & the E Street Band	"The Rising" (Note: Live from the Rose Center for Earth and Space)
Pink	"Just Like a Pill"
Ja Rule; Ashanti; Nas	"Down 4 U" (Ja Rule and Ashanti only) "One Mic" (Nas only) "The Pledge (Remix)"
Shakira	"Objection (Tango)"
Eminem	"White America" "Cleanin' Out My Closet"
P. Diddy; Usher; Busta Rhymes; Pharrell	"Bad Boy for Life" "I Need a Girl (Part One)" "I Need a Girl (Part Two)" "Pass the Courvoisier, Part II"
Sheryl Crow	"Safe and Sound"
The Hives	"Main Offender" (Note: While listed as separate performances, the Hives and the Vines performed back-to-back in what MTV billed as a "battle of the bands")
The Vines	"Get Free"
Justin Timberlake; Clipse	"Like I Love You"
Guns N' Roses	"Welcome to the Jungle" "Madagascar" "Paradise City"

== Presenters ==
=== Pre-show ===
- Sway Calloway and Iann Robinson – announced the winners of the professional categories, Best Video from a Film, and Best Dance Video

=== Main show ===
- James Gandolfini – introduced Bruce Springsteen and the E Street Band
- James Brown – made a special appearance during Jimmy Fallon's opening skit and introduced Britney Spears
- Britney Spears – introduced Michael Jackson and presented Best Pop Video with him
- Jennifer Love Hewitt – introduced Pink
- Enrique Iglesias and Kylie Minogue – presented Best R&B Video
- The Osbournes – appeared in a series of vignettes introducing the Viewer's Choice award voting procedures
- Mary-Kate and Ashley Olsen – presented Breakthrough Video
- B2K – introduced Ja Rule, Ashanti and Nas
- Anthony Kiedis and Brittany Murphy – presented the MTV2 Award
- Johnny Knoxville, Bam Margera and Steve-O – presented Best Rap Video
- Linkin Park (Mike Shinoda and Chester Bennington) and P.O.D. (Sonny Sandoval and "Wuv") – presented Best Hip-Hop Video
- Kate Hudson and Heath Ledger – introduced Shakira
- Simon Cowell, Paula Abdul, Randy Jackson, Kelly Clarkson and Justin Guarini – presented Best New Artist in a Video
- David Lee Roth and Sammy Hagar – presented Best Rock Video
- Mike Myers – introduced Eminem
- Carson Daly – presented MTV's "Lisa Lopes AIDS Scholarship," introduced TLC and later presented Best Group Video
- TLC (Tionne Watkins and Rozonda Thomas) – paid tribute to their deceased groupmate Lisa Lopes
- Run-D.M.C. – introduced P. Diddy
- Lisa Marie Presley and Avril Lavigne – presented Best Female Video
- Jennifer Lopez – introduced New York City Mayor Rudy Giuliani and introduced Sheryl Crow with him
- Triumph the Insult Comic Dog – "interviewed" Moby and Eminem
- Christina Aguilera – presented Best Male Video
- Kirsten Dunst (with host Jimmy Fallon) – introduced The Hives and The Vines
- Brandy – introduced Justin Timberlake
- 'N Sync (Justin Timberlake, JC Chasez, Chris Kirkpatrick and Joey Fatone) – introduced the winners of MTV's "Last Fans Standing" contest and presented Viewer's Choice with them
- Nelly and Kelly Osbourne – presented Video of the Year

== Winners and nominees ==
Winners are in bold text.

Video of the Year	Best Male Video
**Eminem – "Without Me"**; Linkin Park – "In the End"; *NSYNC – "Gone"; Nas – "One Mic"; P.O.D. – "Alive"; The White Stripes – "Fell in Love with a Girl"	**Eminem – "Without Me"**; Craig David – "Walking Away"; Enrique Iglesias – "Hero"; Elton John – "This Train Don't Stop There Anymore"; Nelly – "#1"; Usher – "U Got It Bad"
Best Female Video	Best Group Video
**Pink – "Get the Party Started"**; Ashanti – "Foolish"; Michelle Branch – "All You Wanted"; Shakira – "Whenever, Wherever"; Britney Spears – "I'm a Slave 4 U"	**No Doubt (featuring Bounty Killer) – "Hey Baby"**; Blink-182 – "First Date"; Linkin Park – "In the End"; Dave Matthews Band – "Everyday"; *NSYNC (featuring Nelly) – "Girlfriend (Remix)"; P.O.D. – "Alive"
Best New Artist in a Video	Best Pop Video
**Avril Lavigne – "Complicated"**; Ashanti – "Foolish"; B2K – "Uh Huh"; John Mayer – "No Such Thing"; Puddle of Mudd – "Blurry"	**No Doubt (featuring Bounty Killer) – "Hey Baby"**; Michelle Branch – "All You Wanted"; *NSYNC (featuring Nelly) – "Girlfriend (Remix)"; Pink – "Get the Party Started"; Shakira – "Whenever, Wherever"
Best Rock Video	Best R&B Video
**Linkin Park – "In the End"**; Creed – "My Sacrifice"; Jimmy Eat World – "The Middle"; Korn – "Here to Stay"; P.O.D. – "Youth of the Nation"; System of a Down – "Chop Suey!"	**Mary J. Blige – "No More Drama"**; Aaliyah – "Rock the Boat"; Ashanti – "Foolish"; Alicia Keys – "A Woman's Worth"; Usher – "U Got It Bad"
Best Rap Video	Best Hip-Hop Video
**Eminem – "Without Me"**; DMX – "Who We Be"; Ludacris (featuring Sleepy Brown) – "Saturday (Oooh Oooh!)"; Nas – "One Mic"; P. Diddy (featuring Black Rob and Mark Curry) – "Bad Boy for Life"	**Jennifer Lopez (featuring Ja Rule) – "I'm Real (Murder Remix)"**; Busta Rhymes (featuring P. Diddy and Pharrell) – "Pass the Courvoisier, Part II"; Missy "Misdemeanor" Elliott (featuring Ludacris and Trina) – "One Minute Man (Remix)"; Fat Joe (featuring Ashanti and Ja Rule) – "What's Luv?"; Ja Rule (featuring Ashanti) – "Always on Time"; OutKast (featuring Killer Mike) – "The Whole World"
Best Dance Video	Best Video from a Film
**Pink – "Get the Party Started"**; Dirty Vegas – "Days Go By"; Kylie Minogue – "Can't Get You Out of My Head"; Shakira – "Whenever, Wherever"; Britney Spears – "I'm a Slave 4 U"	**Chad Kroeger (featuring Josey Scott) – "Hero" (from Spider-Man)**; Ludacris (featuring Nate Dogg) – "Area Codes" (from Rush Hour 2); Nelly – "#1" (from Training Day); Will Smith – "Black Suits Comin' (Nod Ya Head)" (from Men in Black II)
Breakthrough Video	Best Direction in a Video
**The White Stripes – "Fell in Love with a Girl"**; Cake – "Short Skirt/Long Jacket"; Coldplay – "Trouble"; The Crystal Method – "Name of the Game"; DMX – "Who We Be"; Maxwell – "This Woman's Work"	**Eminem – "Without Me" (Director: Joseph Kahn)**; Missy "Misdemeanor" Elliott (featuring Ludacris and Trina) – "One Minute Man" (Director: Dave Meyers); Elton John – "This Train Don't Stop There Anymore" (Director: David LaChapelle); P.O.D. – "Alive" (Director: Francis Lawrence); Red Hot Chili Peppers – "By the Way" (Directors: Jonathan Dayton and Valerie Faris)
Best Choreography in a Video	Best Special Effects in a Video
**Kylie Minogue – "Can't Get You Out of My Head" (Choreographer: Michael Rooney)**; Mary J. Blige – "Family Affair" (Choreographer: Fatima Robinson); Britney Spears – "I'm a Slave 4 U" (Choreographer: Wade Robson); Usher – "U Don't Have to Call" (Choreographer: Rosero)	**The White Stripes – "Fell in Love with a Girl" (Special Effects: Twisted Labs and Sébastien Fau)**; Missy "Misdemeanor" Elliott (featuring Ludacris and Trina) – "One Minute Man" (Special Effects: Nathan McGuinness and Marc Varisco); P.O.D. – "Alive" (Special Effects: Pixel Envy); Will Smith – "Black Suits Comin' (Nod Ya Head)" (Special Effects: Pixel Envy)
Best Art Direction in a Video	Best Editing in a Video
**Coldplay – "Trouble" (Art Director: Tim Hope)**; Missy "Misdemeanor" Elliott (featuring Ludacris and Trina) – "One Minute Man" (Art Director: Mike Martella); Elton John – "This Train Don't Stop There Anymore" (Art Director: Kirsten Vallow); Quarashi – "Stick 'Em Up" (Art Director: Bruton Jones)	**The White Stripes – "Fell in Love with a Girl" (Editor: Samuel Danesi)**; Missy "Misdemeanor" Elliott (featuring Ludacris and Trina) – "One Minute Man" (Editor: Jay Robinson); Eminem – "Without Me" (Editor: David Blackburn); System of a Down – "Chop Suey!" (Editor: Nicholas Erasmus)
Best Cinematography in a Video	MTV2 Award
**Moby – "We Are All Made of Stars" (Director of Photography: Brad Rushing)**; Missy "Misdemeanor" Elliott (featuring Ludacris and Trina) – "One Minute Man" (Director of Photography: Karsten "Crash" Gopinath); Alicia Keys – "A Woman's Worth" (Director of Photography: John Perez); Shakira – "Whenever, Wherever" (Director of Photography: Pascal Lebègue)	**Dashboard Confessional – "Screaming Infidelities"**; The Hives – "Hate to Say I Told You So"; Norah Jones – "Don't Know Why"; musiq – "halfcrazy"; Nappy Roots (featuring Jazze Pha) – "Awnaw"; The Strokes – "Last Nite"
Viewer's Choice	International Viewer's Choice: MTV Australia
**Michelle Branch – "Everywhere"**; B2K – "Uh Huh"; Brandy – "What About Us?"; Eminem – "Without Me"; Enrique Iglesias – "Hero"; P.O.D. – "Alive"	**Holly Valance – "Kiss Kiss"**; 1200 Techniques – "Karma"; GT – "(This Is Not a) Love Song"; Kylie Minogue – "Can't Get You Out of My Head"; Silverchair – "The Greatest View"
International Viewer's Choice: MTV Brasil	International Viewer's Choice: MTV Canada
**Titãs – "Epitáfio"**; Arnaldo Antunes – "Essa Mulher"; Capital Inicial – "A Sua Maneira"; Charlie Brown Jr. – "Hoje Eu Acordei Feliz"; Cidade Negra – "Girassol"; CPM 22 – "Tarde de Outubro"; Engenheiros do Hawaii – "3^{a} do Plural"; Kelly Key – "Baba"; KLB – "Olhar 43"; Raimundos – "Sanidade"; O Rappa – "Instinto Coletivo"; Rodox – "Olhos Abertos"; Sandy & Junior – "O Amor Faz"; Skank – "Tanto"; Supla – "Garota de Berlim"; O Surto – "O Veneno"; Xis – "Chapa o Coco"	**Nickelback – "Too Bad"**; Choclair – "Light It Up"; Remy Shand – "Rocksteady"; Sloan – "If It Feels Good Do It"; Swollen Members – "Fuel Injected"
International Viewer's Choice: MTV China	International Viewer's Choice: MTV Latin America (North)
**Zheng Jun – "1/3 Dream"**; Han Hong – "Awake"; Na Ying – "I Like You Only"; Sun Nan – "As Long as You Are Well"; Yu Quan – "The Train That Goes to Spring"	**Shakira – "Suerte"**; Enrique Iglesias – "Héroe"; Juanes – "A Dios le Pido"; Jumbo – "Cada Vez Que Me Voy"; Celso Piña (featuring Control Machete and Blanquito Man) – "Cumbia sobre el Rio"; Paulina Rubio – "Si Tú Te Vas"
International Viewer's Choice: MTV Latin America (Pacific)	International Viewer's Choice: MTV Latin America (Atlantic)
**Juanes – "A Dios le Pido"**; Enrique Iglesias – "Héroe"; Javiera y Los Imposibles – "Maldita Primavera"; Nicole – "Viaje Infinito"; Stereo 3 – "Amanecer sin Ti"; Shakira – "Suerte"	**Diego Torres – "Color Esperanza"**; Babasónicos – "El Loco"; Érica García – "Positiva"; Enrique Iglesias – "Escapar"; Juanes – "A Dios le Pido"; Shakira – "Suerte"

== Artists with multiple wins and nominations ==
Artists who received multiple awards
Wins	Artist
4	Eminem
3	The White Stripes
2	No Doubt
2	Pink

Artists who received multiple nominations
Nominations	Artist
7	Shakira
6	Eminem
6	Missy Elliott
6	P.O.D.
5	Enrique Iglesias
4	The White Stripes
3	Ashanti
3	Britney Spears
3	Elton John
3	Juanes
3	Kylie Minogue
3	Linkin Park
3	Michelle Branch
3	*NSYNC
3	Pink
3	Usher
2	Alicia Keys
2	B2K
2	Coldplay
2	DMX
2	Ludacris
2	Mary J. Blige
2	Nas
2	Nelly
2	No Doubt
2	Will Smith

== Music Videos with multiple wins and nominations ==
Music Videos that received multiple awards
Wins	Artist	Music Video
4	Eminem	"Without Me"
3	The White Stripes	"Fell in Love with a Girl"
2	No Doubt (featuring Bounty Killer)	"Hey Baby"
2	Pink	"Get the Party Started"

Music Videos that received multiple nominations
Nominations	Artist	Music video
7	Shakira	"Whenever, Wherever"
6	Eminem	"Without Me"
6	Missy Elliott (featuring Ludacris and Trina)	"One Minute Man"
5	P.O.D.	"Alive"
4	Enrique Iglesias	"Hero"
4	The White Stripes	"Fell in Love with a Girl"
3	Ashanti	"Foolish"
3	Britney Spears	"I'm a Slave 4 U"
3	Elton John	"This Train Don't Stop There Anymore"
3	Juanes	"A Dios le Pido"
3	Kylie Minogue	"Can't Get You Out of My Head"
3	Linkin Park	"In the End"
3	Pink	"Get the Party Started"
2	Alicia Keys	"A Woman's Worth"
2	B2K	"Uh Huh"
2	Coldplay	"Trouble"
2	DMX	"Who We Be"
2	Michelle Branch	"All You Wanted"
2	Nas	"One Mic"
2	Nelly	"#1"
2	No Doubt (featuring Bounty Killer)	"Hey Baby"
2	*NSYNC (featuring Nelly)	"Girlfriend (Remix)"
2	Usher	"U Got It Bad"
2	Will Smith	"Black Suits Comin' (Nod Ya Head)"

== See also ==
- 2002 MTV Europe Music Awards
