= Michelle Branch =

American musician (born 1983)

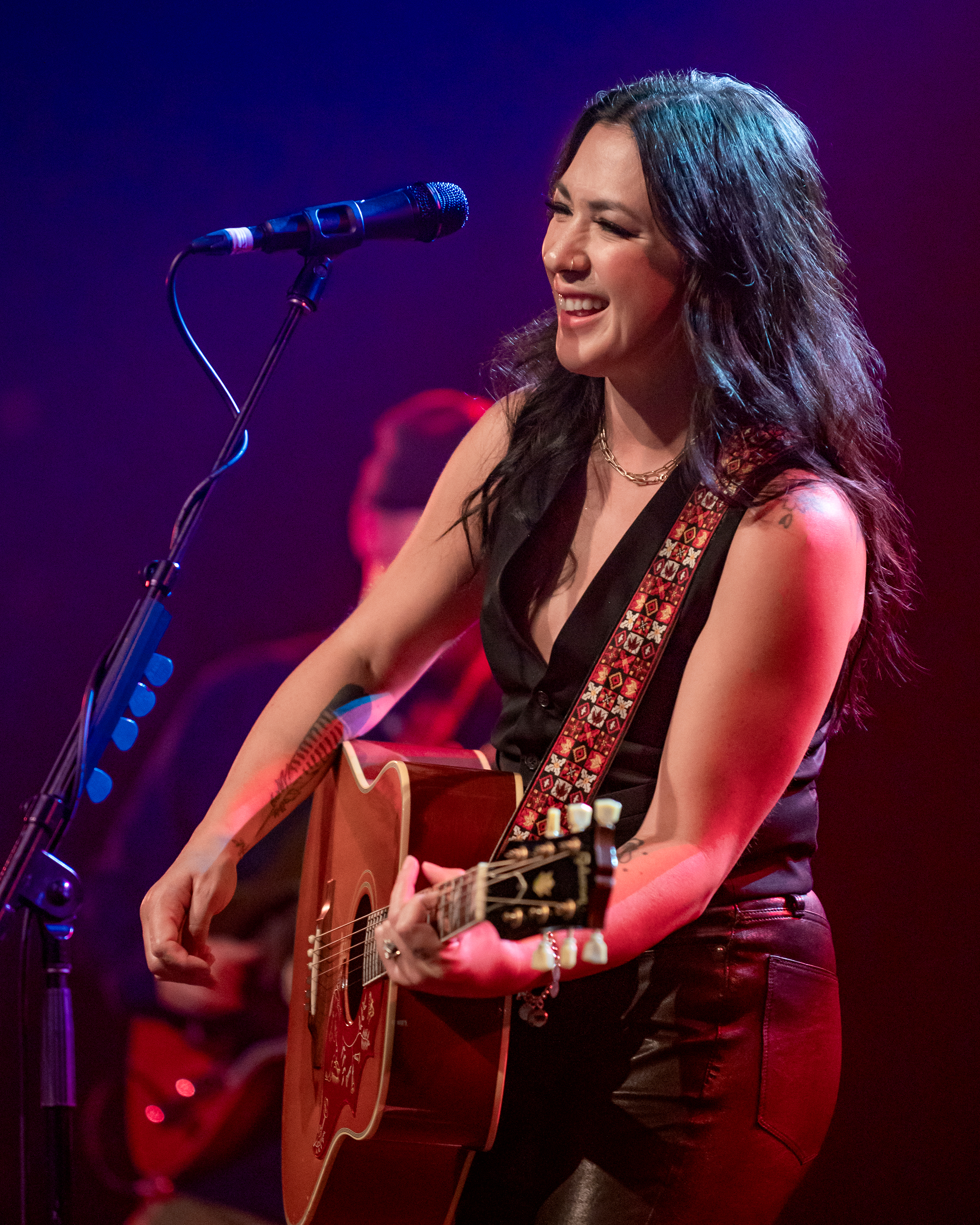
- Branch in 2023
- Born: Michelle Jacquet Branch; July 2, 1983 (age 43); Sedona, Arizona, U.S.
- Other name: Michelle Carney
- Occupations: Singer; musician; songwriter; actress
- Years active: 1999–present
- Spouses: Teddy Landau (m. 2004; div. 2015); Patrick Carney (m. 2019)
- Children: 3
- Awards: Full list
- Musical career
- Genres: Pop rock; rock; country
- Instruments: Vocals; guitar
- Labels: Maverick; Warner Bros.; Reprise; Reprise Nashville; Verve; Nonesuch; BMG
- Formerly of: The Wreckers
- Website: michellebranch.com

Michelle Jacquet Branch (born July 2, 1983) is an American singer, songwriter, and guitarist. She won a Grammy Award for Best Pop Collaboration with Vocals with Santana for their 2002 single, "The Game of Love".

As a solo recording artist, Branch's first album Broken Bracelet came out in 2000. After signing to the record label Maverick the next year, her second album The Spirit Room followed and contained the singles "Everywhere" and "All You Wanted". Her third album Hotel Paper was released in 2003. Two years later, she formed the country music duo the Wreckers with Jessica Harp, and produced the Grammy-nominated single "Leave the Pieces". The Wreckers disbanded in 2007 to pursue their respective solo careers. Since then, she has released extended plays in 2010 and 2011, and a fourth solo album, Hopeless Romantic in 2017. Her fifth studio album, The Trouble with Fever, was released in 2022.

== Early life and education ==
Branch was born on July 2, 1983, in Sedona, Arizona, to Peggy and David Branch. She is of Dutch-Indonesian and French descent through her mother, and of Irish descent through her father. Her maternal grandmother, who hailed from East Java, Indonesia, was held in a Japanese internment camp during World War II. After the war she moved to Holland, where Branch's mother, Peggy, was born. Peggy was five years old when the family moved from the Netherlands to the United States and settled in Arizona.

Beginning to sing at the age of three, Branch enrolled in voice lessons at Northern Arizona University when she was eight. Branch received her first guitar for her 14th birthday. After teaching herself chords, Branch composed her first song "Fallen" within a week of receiving her guitar. She initially attended Sedona Red Rock High School; however, Branch finished the last two years of her high school education through home schooling so that she could focus on her music career.

== Career ==
=== 1999–2000: Broken Bracelet ===
To support Branch's interests, her parents helped her book local gigs in Sedona, and later financed her independent album Broken Bracelet. Her set list at these gigs included covers of songs by Sheryl Crow, Lisa Loeb, Jewel, and Fleetwood Mac.

In December 1999, she posted two of her songs on the Rolling Stone website, which caught the attention of both pop rock band Hanson and former Rolling Stone writer and Los Angeles record producer Jeff Rabhan, eventually leading to two gigs opening for Hanson in 2000.

In June 2000, Branch self-produced Broken Bracelet, a compilation of songs she wrote starting from when she was 14; the album was released on the independent record label Twin Dragon Records. Its title was inspired from a bracelet made by pop singer Jewel, given to Branch by musician Steve Poltz at a Lisa Loeb concert she attended. Poltz told Branch that "when it breaks, you'll be famous." The Broken Bracelet recordings were destroyed in the Nashville floods in May 2010.

=== 2001–2005: The Spirit Room and Hotel Paper ===
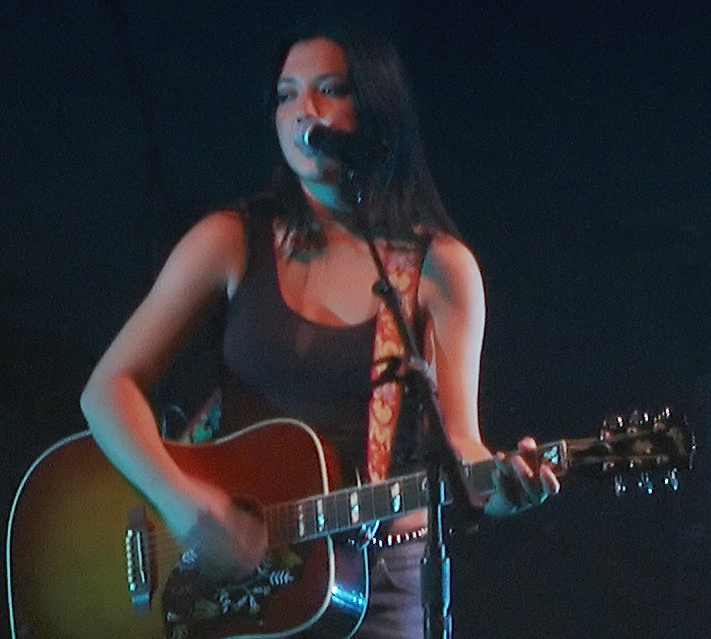
Branch performing in October 2003.

"Everywhere" (2001)
A sample of Branch's debut single, "Everywhere".

In 2001, Branch signed a recording deal with Maverick Records, where she began working with John Shanks to produce her second album. The album, The Spirit Room, was released in August 2001, producing the hit single "Everywhere". The single was a commercial success, winning the 2002 MTV Video Music Awards Viewer's Choice Award. "Everywhere" was later followed by singles "All You Wanted" and "Goodbye to You". In August 2001, she appeared on Total Request Live after "Everywhere" reached No. 4 on the show's chart. Due to the mainstream success of those released singles, The Spirit Room was certified Double Platinum by the RIAA for selling over two million copies in the United States. Branch also sang on the song "Deeper" from Hanson's 2004 album Underneath. VH1 also released a Pop-Up Video for her song "All You Wanted". The Spirit Room has sold 3 million copies worldwide to date.

Branch met Justincase before her debut on Maverick Records, becoming friends over the Internet before meeting in Las Vegas for a music convention in 2000. Justincase was signed to Maverick Records in late 2001 with the help of Branch. A self-titled album was released on October 29, 2002, and included several collaborations with Branch, including the lead single, "Don't Cry for Us".

In 2002, Branch teamed up with Santana, alongside songwriters Gregg Alexander and Rick Nowels, to produce the song "The Game of Love", which went on to win a Grammy Award for Best Pop Collaboration with Vocals. She also earned a Grammy nomination in 2003 for Best New Artist, which was won by Norah Jones.

Branch's third overall album, Hotel Paper, was released in 2003 and debuted at No. 2 on the Billboard 200 chart and has been certified Platinum by the RIAA for selling over one million copies. The album was met with mixed reviews. Its lead single, "Are You Happy Now?", was a chart success, earning Branch a nomination for the Grammy Award for Best Female Rock Vocal Performance, though the song lost to Pink's "Trouble". The following singles, "Breathe" and "'Til I Get over You", did not match the first single's success. Branching out into television, she appeared in several shows, including Buffy the Vampire Slayer (in an uncredited appearance), American Dreams, and Charmed (as herself). In June 2004, she appeared on MTV's Faking the Video alongside Nick Lachey and JC Chasez. She also appeared in the 2002 Rob Schneider film The Hot Chick as a club DJ.

=== 2005–2007: The Wreckers ===
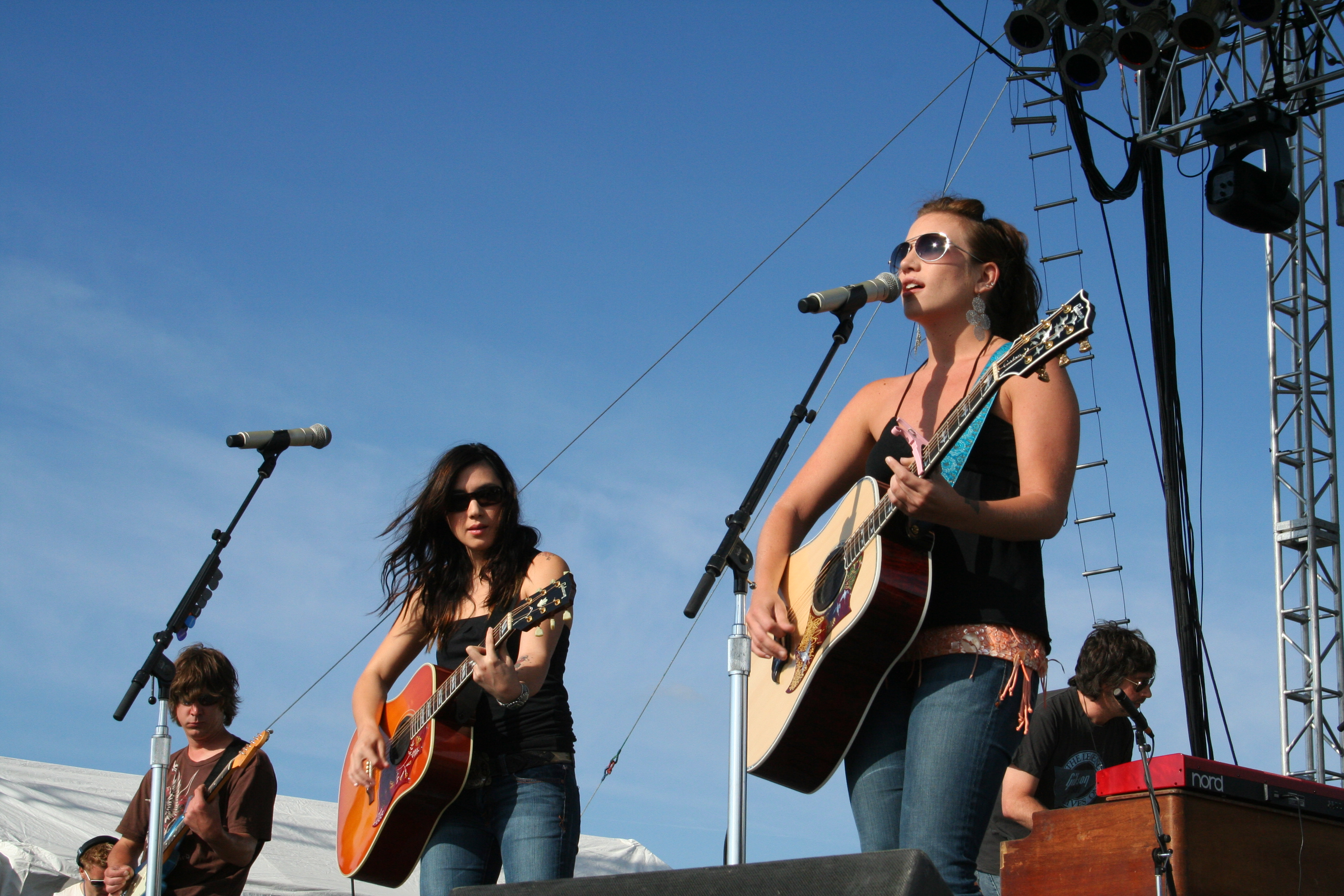
Michelle Branch (center) during a June 2007 concert with Jessica Harp (right) as The Wreckers.

In July 2005, Branch began collaborating with her backup singer and longtime friend Jessica Harp. They were initially known as the Cass County Homewreckers as a joke by Branch's husband, but they trimmed it down to the Wreckers. Their album attempted to combine their respective genres—pop rock and country. It was originally slated for release in June 2005 but was delayed because of reasons surrounding Branch's pregnancy. The duo's first single "Leave the Pieces" was released in February 2006, while their album Stand Still, Look Pretty was released in May.

During this period, they contributed to Santana's album All That I Am, with the song "I'm Feeling You", appearing on the American teen television drama One Tree Hill, and joined country music stars Rascal Flatts on a U.S. tour. They initially toured with Gavin DeGraw, Tyler Hilton and Bethany Joy Galeotti, which was also written into the show during the second season. The group was nominated for Vocal Duo of the Year at the 2006 Country Music Association Awards and for a Grammy Award for Best Country Performance by a Duo or Group with Vocal for the song "Leave the Pieces" in December 2006. Stand Still, Look Pretty was certified Gold by the RIAA with sales of 851,000 copies as of March 2009. The Wreckers split in 2007.

Later that same year, Branch sold her Calabasas, California home and moved to Nashville, Tennessee.

=== 2008–2012: Unreleased albums ===
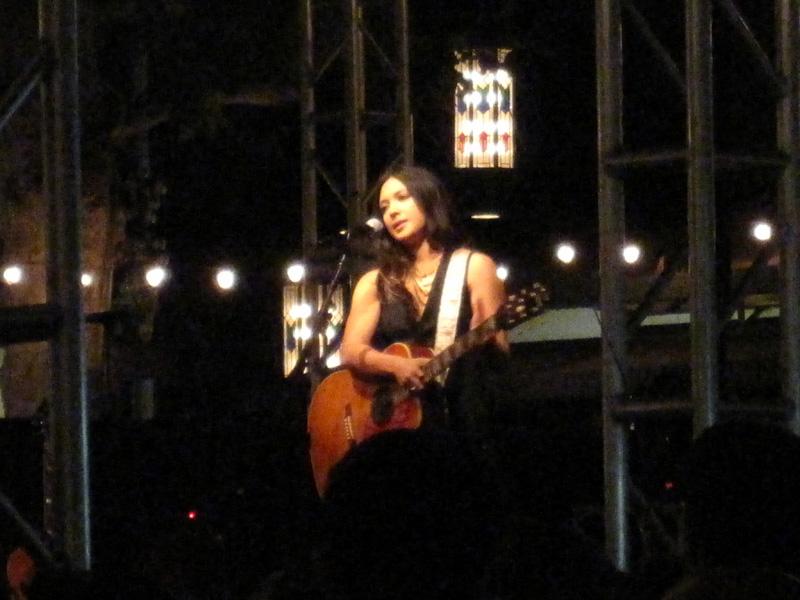
Branch performing in August 2009.

Branch wrote an unreleased song for Mandy Moore's 2007 album Wild Hope, and also wrote "Together" for the soundtrack of The Sisterhood of the Traveling Pants 2; it was also featured as the final song ever played on the CBS TV soap opera, Guiding Light. In October 2007, she announced that she was working on a new solo album and later reported the title would be Everything Comes and Goes. In June 2008, she played several live shows in preparation for the album's release with her sister Nicole singing backing vocals.

In early 2009, she sang the song "I Lose My Heart" in a duet with Chris Isaak on his new album Mr. Lucky. A video for the first single from the album "Sooner Or Later" was released on July 28, 2009. Also in 2009, she recorded "A Case of You" (originally by Joni Mitchell) for the compilation Covered, A Revolution in Sound which commemorated Warner Bros. Records 50th anniversary. A video was made for the song "This Way" and uploaded to Branch's official YouTube account in October 2009, but it was not released as a single and did not chart. (The video was included on a limited edition DVD entitled The Video Anthology available on michellebranch.com.) Everything Comes and Goes was finally released as a six-track extended play on July 16, 2010, via Branch's website and would be available at all retailers one month later. In 2010, Branch and R&B/hip-hop producer Timbaland collaborated on a pop/R&B song entitled "Getaway" and released a video.

In December 2010, Branch announced her return to her pop/rock roots for her album, West Coast Time. In early 2011, Branch released three previously unreleased songs from Everything Comes and Goes including, "Texas In the Mirror", "Take a Chance on Me", and "Long Goodbye", the latter a duet with Dwight Yoakam. On March 22, 2011, in a video regarding updates on the third studio album uploaded via Branch's YouTube account, Branch confirmed that half the album is finished and added that "it's sounding really really good....it's all going well and it's all on time." On April 14, 2011, it was announced that Branch had finished recording the album, she also added that "only mixing/mastering left. Michelle practiced and recorded a few tracks with Tilted Head and FIVE lead singer Joshua Barton, however it is still a work in progress." On May 26, 2011, Branch hosted a live webchat with fans in which she previewed her new single "Loud Music", which was released to the iTunes Store on June 14, 2011. The song was co-written and produced by British writers Jim Irvin and Julian Emery who collaborated with Branch on several songs on the album. In the webcast, Branch also mentioned songs on the album called "Mastermind" and "The Story Of Us" and also added that "Through The Radio" would be a hidden track on the CD. In a previous webcast, she premiered a song from the album called "Spark".

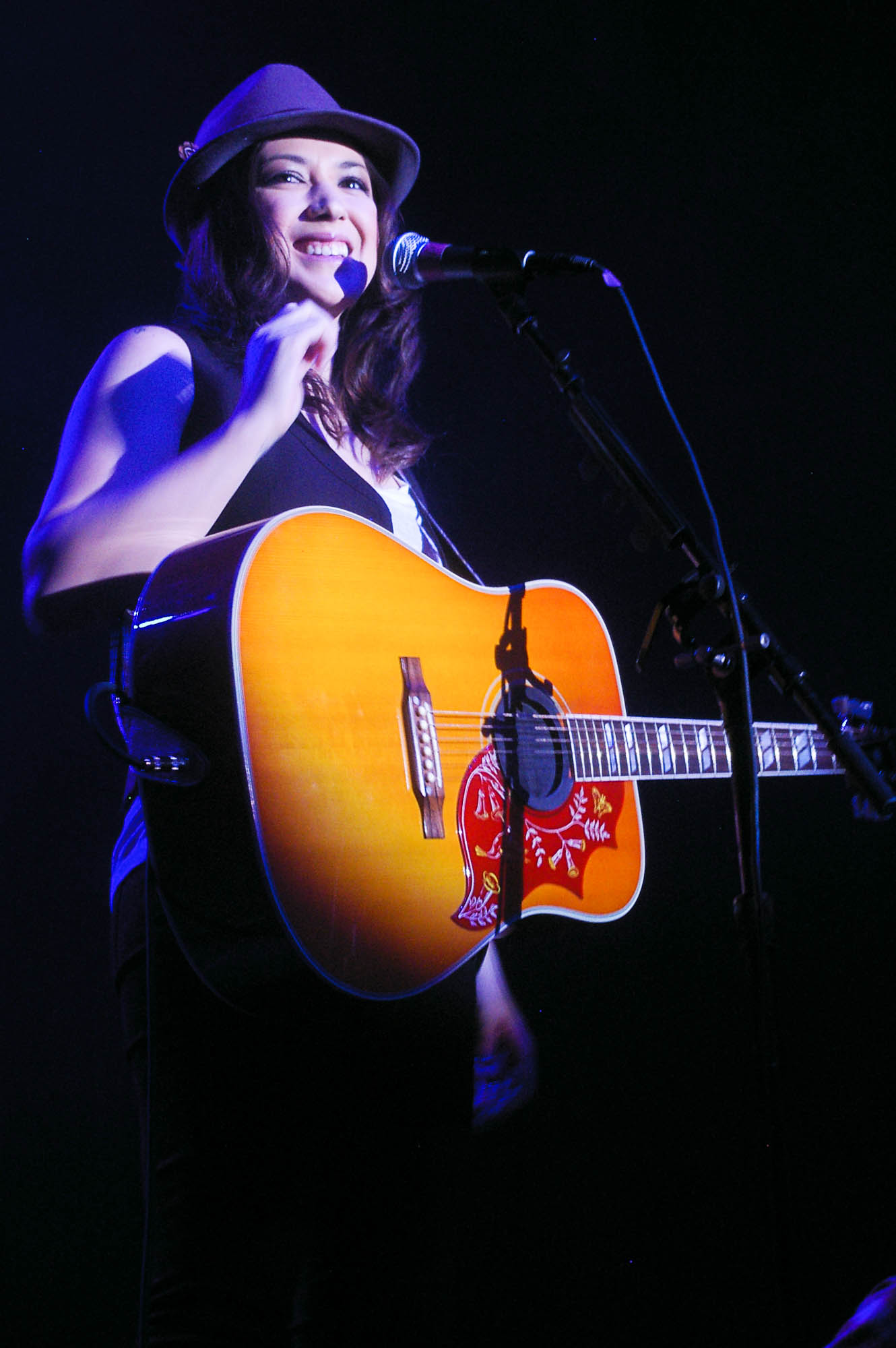
Branch performing in 2010.

During a live outdoor performance at the Warner Brothers building, she performed another new song, dedicated to her then-husband Teddy Landau, "For Dear Life". In June 2011, she released the album's first single titled "Loud Music". It has charted on the Adult Pop Songs chart. On July 12, 2011, Branch performed "God Bless America" at the MLB All-Star Game, in Phoenix, Arizona. In September, a new song "Another Sun" was featured on Fox's TV series Terra Nova. On October 29, 2011, she gave a small concert to approximately 200 fans at the Egyptian Room in downtown Indianapolis, as part of the Gravedigger's Ball. On December 12, 2011, Branch released a song titled "If You Happen to Call" for free download on the official website.

In February 2012, VH1 hosted the "100 Greatest Women In Music" special and she was nominated in both the "Pop" category and the "Greatest Female Artist of All Time". On April 3, 2012, Branch performed "Leave the Pieces" with Kelly Clarkson in Los Angeles as part of Clarkson's Stronger Tour. On September 5, the singer premiered a new pop-rock track "Mastermind". In September 2012, Branch joined chef Michael Mina as a co-host of Cook Taste Eat, an online cooking show that aims to teach viewers how to cook quality food at home.

As with her release, Everything Comes and Goes, West Coast Time has seen numerous delays for, as yet, unknown reasons. Branch has confirmed on her Twitter account that she knew as much as the fans did about the delay. In January 2011, Branch confirmed in an interview with Katie Krause from Hollywire.com that the album would be released later that year. On June 1, 2011, Branch announced that the album was called West Coast Time and slated for a September 2011 release date. On December 25, 2012, Branch confirmed that West Coast Time was scheduled for release in Spring 2013, but the album has not yet been released.

=== 2013–2017: New record deal and Hopeless Romantic ===
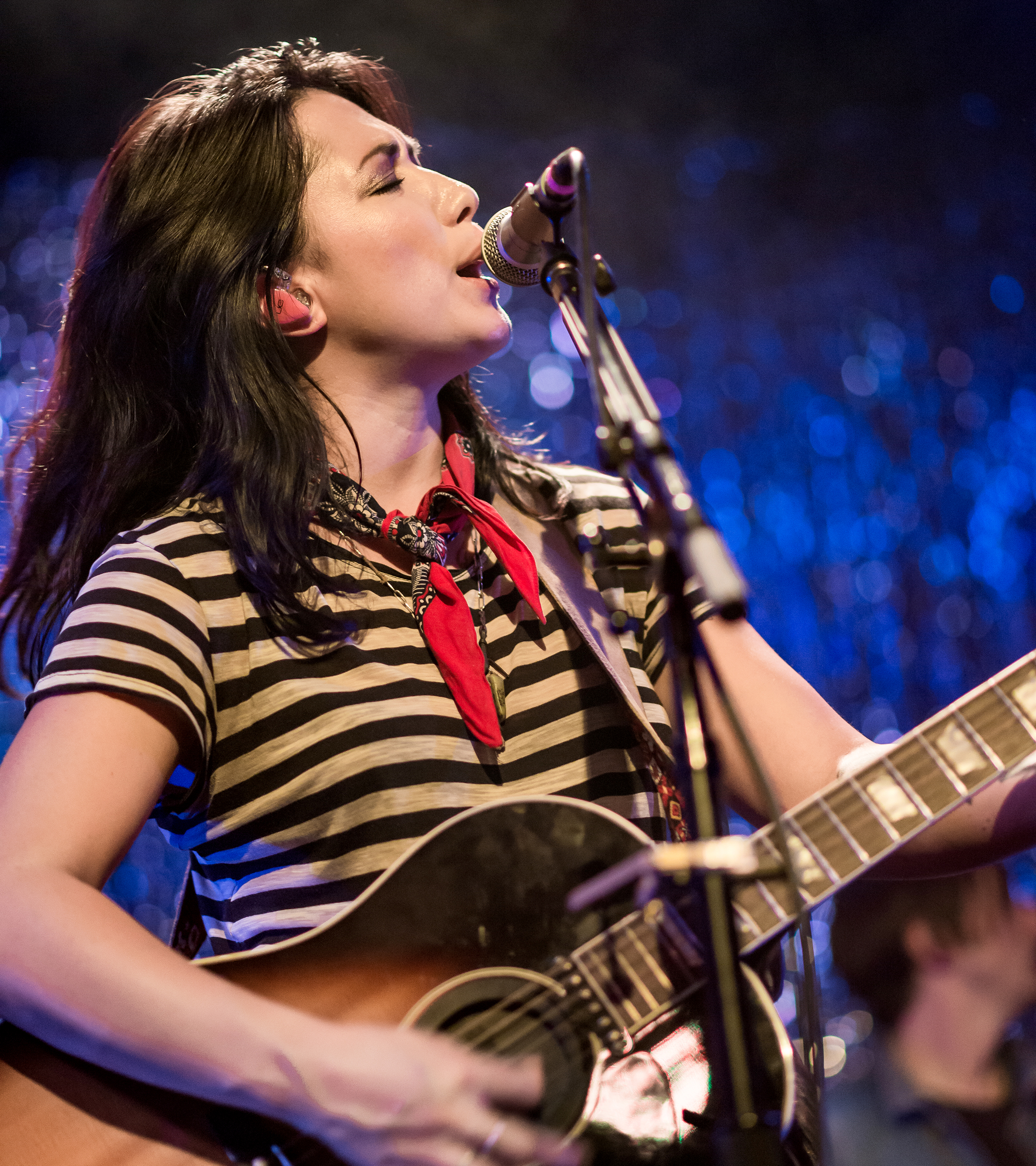
Branch performing at Slim's in San Francisco in July 2017.

For much of 2013, Branch wrote songs and moved on from the unreleased West Coast Time. On November 5, 2013, Branch announced that she had started recording a new album in London with Martin Terefe. On February 2, 2014, she confirmed on Twitter that the rest of the album would be recorded in Nashville for a pop-rock sound. In October 2014, she recorded a cover of Radiohead's "Creep" which was subsequently used in an episode of Stalker.

On July 17, 2015, Branch announced that she had signed with Verve Records. In May 2016, she appeared on Full Frontal with Samantha Bee to sing "Goodbye Ted Cruz", a reworking of her song "Goodbye to You", as a tongue-in-cheek lament to the suspension of Ted Cruz's US presidential campaign.

In December 2016, Entertainment Weekly announced Branch's new album, Hopeless Romantic, which was released on April 7, 2017. Branch announced in September 2017, that she had parted ways with Verve Records.

Branch and Patrick Carney performed a cover of the song "A Horse with No Name" for a season 4 episode of BoJack Horseman titled "The Old Sugarman Place", where the title character drives through the desert. This version also appears on the soundtrack album of the series.

=== 2021–present: The Trouble with Fever and The Spirit Room reimagined ===
Branch performing at The Fonda Theatre in Los Angeles in October 2023.

During a January 5, 2021, Livestream performance for Snapple, Branch confirmed that she would be re-recording her album The Spirit Room in March 2021 to celebrate its anniversary. On September 10, 2021, Branch performed the album in its entirety during a special virtual concert. An afterparty and Q&A session followed. It was released on October 15, 2021.

On July 12, 2022, Branch announced on social media that her new single titled "I'm a Man" would be released July 15, 2022. The single was included in her fifth studio album, The Trouble with Fever, which was released on September 16, 2022. The album art for The Trouble with Fever is a photograph taken by Branch's father-in-law, James Carney.

To celebrate the 25th anniversary of The Spirit Room, Branch announced the everywhere and back again tour, as well as a new EP titled everywhere and back again. The EP consisted of reimagined versions of her previous songs, including some collaborations with other artists. In September 2026, Branch announced that Sasami and Josie Edwards would be performing as a supporting acts for the tour.

== Musical style and influence ==
Branch has stated that her music has been influenced by The Beatles, Led Zeppelin, Jimi Hendrix, Aerosmith, Lisa Loeb, Joni Mitchell, Queen, Alanis Morissette, Dolores O'Riordan, Jewel, Fleetwood Mac and Cat Stevens. She also likes classical music and older country music. Vocally, she has been described as a soprano. Branch mainly uses a Gibson Hummingbird after retiring her blue Taylor 614ce.

== Personal life ==
Branch married her bass player Teddy Landau (b. 1964) in Mexico on May 23, 2004, and gave birth to a child in August 2005. Branch separated from Landau in 2014, and their divorce was finalized in November 2015.

In 2015, Branch met Patrick Carney of the Black Keys at a Grammy party, and the two started dating during the production of Hopeless Romantic. In 2017, Branch and her child moved into Carney's home in Nashville. Branch and Carney have a son, who was born in August 2018. The couple lived in Nashville with their children and two Irish wolfhounds. Branch and Carney were married on April 20, 2019. In December 2020, she revealed she suffered a miscarriage. In August 2021, Branch announced she was pregnant, and in February 2022, she gave birth to a daughter, her third child and her second with Carney. On August 11, 2022, Branch announced her separation from Carney after accusing him of infidelity. She was arrested on a domestic assault charge the next day, having allegedly slapped Carney. Billboard reported that the charges against Branch were dropped at the request of the state on August 24. The following month, Branch and Carney filed to suspend their divorce proceedings.

== Discography ==
Studio albums

- Broken Bracelet (2000)
- The Spirit Room (2001)
- Hotel Paper (2003)
- Hopeless Romantic (2017)
- The Trouble with Fever (2022)
- Happy Times (2027)

== Filmography ==
Year	Title	Role	Notes
2001	Buffy the Vampire Slayer	Herself/Musical Guest	Episode "Tabula Rasa"
2002	American Dreams	Lesley Gore	Episode "The End of the Innocence"
2002	The Hot Chick	DJ	
2003	Charmed	Herself/Musical Guest	Episode "Centennial Charmed"
2004	The Chris Isaak Show	Herself/Musical Guest	Episode "Candidate"
2005	One Tree Hill	Herself/Musical Guest	Episode "The Hero Dies In This One"
2010	Hell's Kitchen	Herself	Episode "16 Chefs Compete"

== Awards and nominations ==
=== Grammy Awards ===
The Grammy Awards are awarded annually by the National Academy of Recording Arts and Sciences. Branch has won one award from four nominations.

Year	Nominee / work	Award	Result
2003	Michelle Branch	Best New Artist	Nominated
2003	"The Game of Love" (with Santana)	Best Pop Collaboration with Vocals	Won
2004	"Are You Happy Now?"	Best Female Rock Vocal Performance	Nominated
2007	"Leave the Pieces"	Best Country Performance by a Duo or Group with Vocal	Nominated

=== MTV Asia Awards ===
The MTV Asia Awards were first established in 2002 by MTV Asia. Branch received one nomination.

Year	Nominee / work	Award	Result
2004	Michelle Branch	Favorite Female Artist	Nominated

=== MTV Video Music Awards ===
The MTV Video Music Awards were established in 1984 by MTV to celebrate the top music videos of the year. Branch received three nominations.

Year	Nominee / work	Award	Result
2002	"All You Wanted"	Best Female Video	Nominated
2002	"All You Wanted"	Best Pop Video	Nominated
2002	"Everywhere"	Viewer's Choice	Won

=== Teen Choice Awards ===
The Teen Choice Awards is an annual awards show first aired in 1999 by Fox Broadcasting Company. Branch received four nominations.

Year	Nominee / work	Award	Result
2002	Michelle Branch	Choice Breakout Artist	Nominated
2002	"All You Wanted"	Choice Love Song	Nominated
2002	"All You Wanted"	Choice Summer Song	Nominated
2003	"The Game of Love"	Choice Hook Up	Nominated

=== Other awards ===
Year	Organization	Award	Result	Ref
2003	IFPI Hong Kong Top Sales Music Awards	Top 10 Best Selling Foreign Albums (as Hotel Paper)	Won	
2003	Clear Top 10 Awards (Indonesia)	Amazing International Hitmaker	Nominated	
2004	Groovevolt Music and Fashion Awards	Best Pop Album - Female (The Spirit Room)	Nominated	
2004	BMI Pop Awards	Award-Winning Song ("Are You Happy Now?")	Won	
2006	Country Music Association	Vocal Duo of the Year (as The Wreckers)	Nominated	
2007	MusicRow Awards	Major Label Breakout Artist of the Year (as The Wreckers)	Won	
2007	R&R Readers' Poll	Best New Performer (as The Wreckers)	Won	
2007	Academy of Country Music	Top Vocal Duo (as The Wreckers)	Nominated	
2007	Academy of Country Music	Top New Vocal Duo (as The Wreckers)	Nominated	
2007	Country Music Association	Vocal Duo of the Year (as The Wreckers)	Nominated	
2008	Academy of Country Music	Top New Vocal Duo (as The Wreckers)	Nominated	
2008	Country Music Association	Vocal Duo of the Year (as The Wreckers)	Nominated	
