= MTV Video Music Award for Best Pop =

Annual music video award

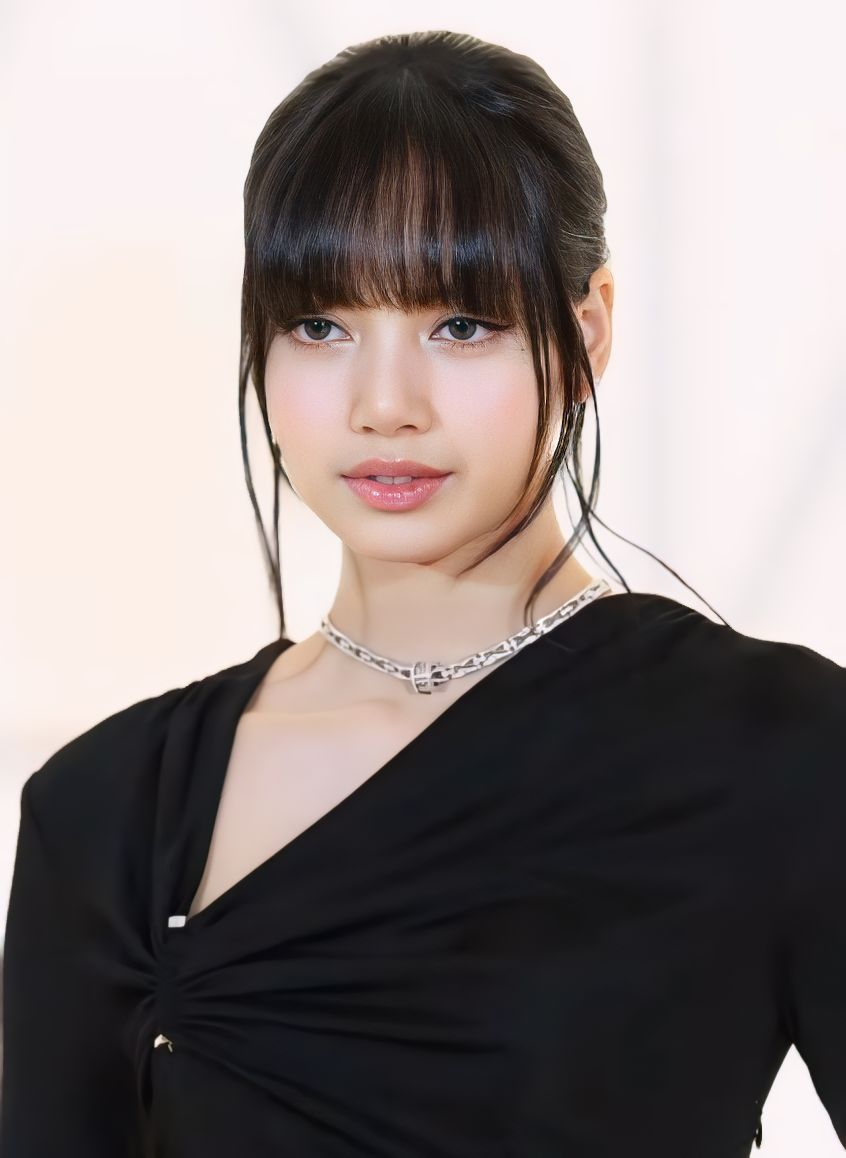
- Lisa is the most recent recipient for "Dream"
- Awarded for: Music videos for pop music
- Country: United States
- Presented by: MTV
- First award: 1999
- Currently held by: Lisa – "Dream" (2026)

Highlights
- Most wins: Britney Spears, Taylor Swift and Ariana Grande (3)
- Most nominations: Ariana Grande (8)
- Website: VMA website

The MTV Video Music Award for Best Pop is given at the annual MTV Video Music Awards. The category was first presented in 1999 under the name of Best Pop Video, as MTV began to put several teen pop acts in heavy rotation. Nominations, however, were not just limited to pop acts, as dance, R&B, pop/rock, and reggaeton artists have also received nominations throughout the award's history.

In 2007, MTV eliminated this award along with all of the genre categories, but it returned in 2008. From 2017, the word "Video" was removed from the names of all genre categories, leaving this award with its current name: Best Pop. In 2024, the nominees were based on the artists, instead of music videos.

Britney Spears, Taylor Swift, and Ariana Grande have received the most wins in this category, winning three awards each. NSYNC, Spears, and Swift are the only acts to win the award for two consecutive years. Grande has received the most nominations in this category with eight.

== Recipients ==
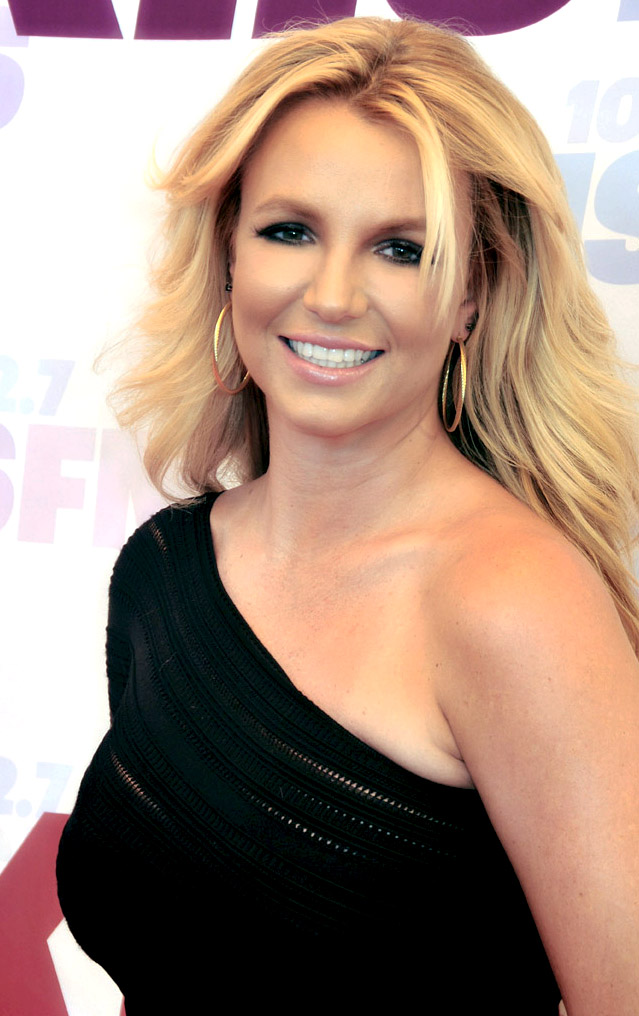
Britney Spears ties for the record for the most wins (3).

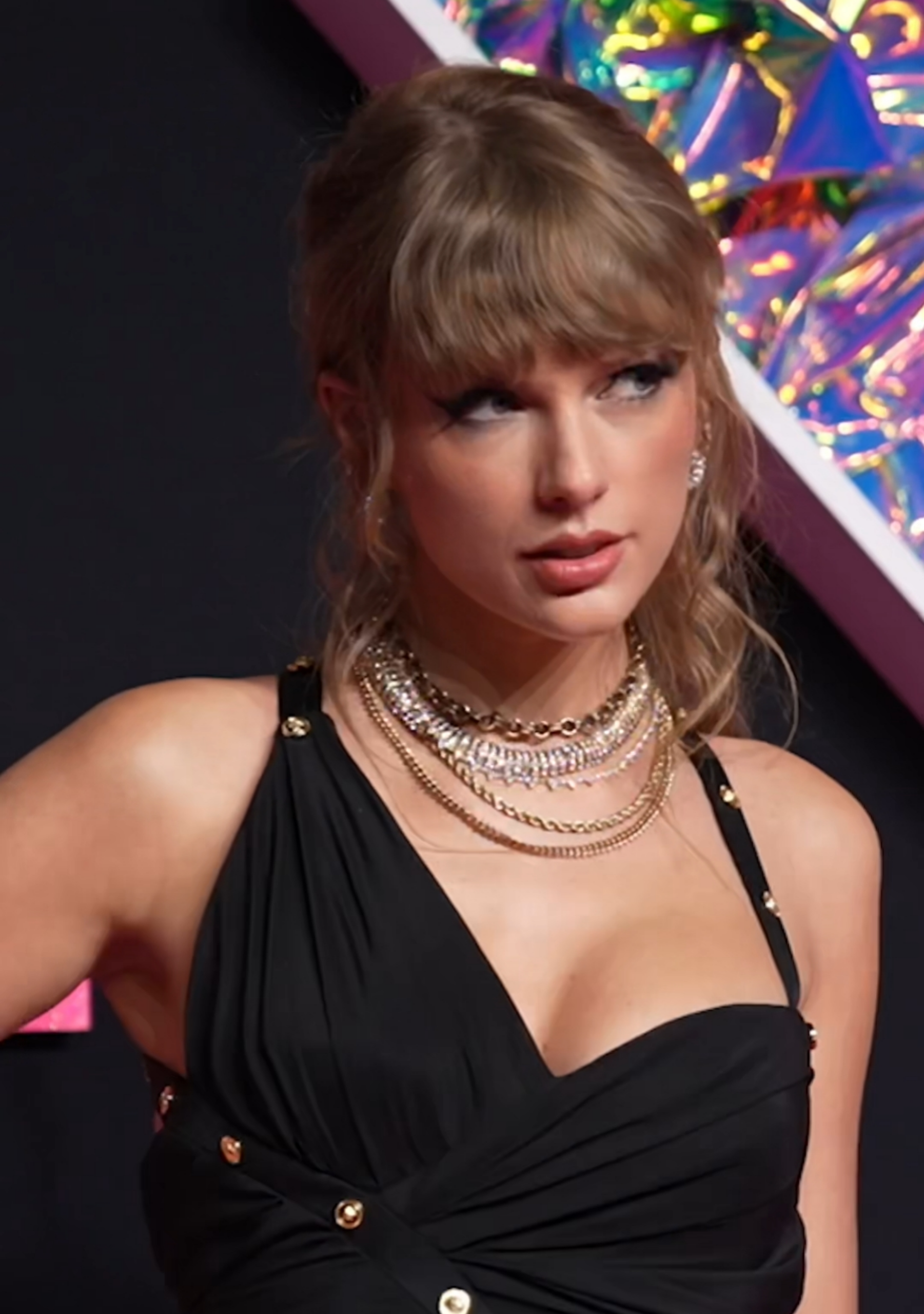
Taylor Swift ties for the record for the most wins (3).

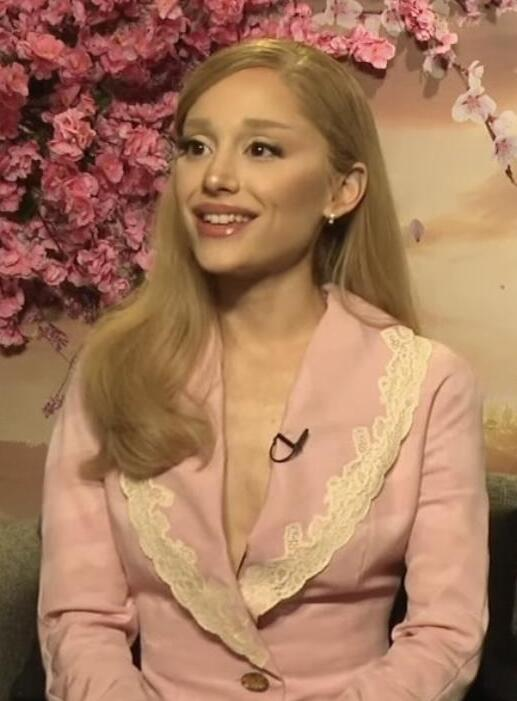
Ariana Grande ties record for the most wins (3) and holds the record for nominations (8).

=== 1990s ===
Recipients
Year (Note: Each year is linked to the article about the MTV Video Music Awards held that year.)	Winner(s)	Video	Nominees	Ref.
1999	Ricky Martin	"Livin' la Vida Loca"	Backstreet Boys – "I Want It That Way"; Jennifer Lopez – "If You Had My Love"; NSYNC – "Tearin' Up My Heart"; Britney Spears – "...Baby One More Time"	

=== 2000s ===
Recipients
Year	Winner(s)	Video	Nominees	Ref.
2000	NSYNC	"Bye Bye Bye"	Christina Aguilera – "What a Girl Wants"; Blink-182 – "All the Small Things"; Destiny's Child – "Say My Name"; Britney Spears – "Oops!...I Did It Again"	
2001	NSYNC	"Pop"	Christina Aguilera, Lil' Kim, Mýa and P!nk (featuring Missy Elliott) – "Lady Marmalade"; Backstreet Boys – "The Call"; Destiny's Child – "Survivor"; Britney Spears – "Stronger"	
2002	No Doubt (featuring Bounty Killer)	"Hey Baby"	Michelle Branch – "All You Wanted"; NSYNC (featuring Nelly) – "Girlfriend" (Remix); P!nk – "Get the Party Started"; Shakira – "Whenever, Wherever"	
2003	Justin Timberlake	"Cry Me a River"	Christina Aguilera (featuring Redman) – "Dirrty"; Kelly Clarkson – "Miss Independent"; Avril Lavigne – "Sk8er Boi"; No Doubt (featuring Lady Saw) – "Underneath It All"	
2004	No Doubt	"It's My Life"	Hilary Duff – "Come Clean"; Avril Lavigne – "Don't Tell Me"; Jessica Simpson – "With You"; Britney Spears – "Toxic"	
2005	Kelly Clarkson	"Since U Been Gone"	Lindsay Lohan – "Rumors"; Jesse McCartney – "Beautiful Soul"; Ashlee Simpson – "Pieces of Me"; Gwen Stefani – "Hollaback Girl"	
2006	P!nk	"Stupid Girls"	Christina Aguilera – "Ain't No Other Man"; Nelly Furtado (featuring Timbaland) – "Promiscuous"; Madonna – "Hung Up"; Shakira (featuring Wyclef Jean) – "Hips Don't Lie"	
2007	—N/a			
2008	Britney Spears	"Piece of Me"	Danity Kane – "Damaged"; Jonas Brothers – "Burnin' Up"; Panic! at the Disco – "Nine in the Afternoon"; Tokio Hotel – "Ready, Set, Go!"	
2009	Britney Spears	"Womanizer"	Beyoncé – "Single Ladies (Put a Ring on It)"; Cobra Starship (featuring Leighton Meester) – "Good Girls Go Bad"; Lady Gaga – "Poker Face"; Wisin & Yandel – "Abusadora"	

=== 2010s ===
Recipients
Year	Winner(s)	Video	Nominees	Ref.
2010	Lady Gaga	"Bad Romance"	Beyoncé (featuring Lady Gaga) – "Video Phone" (Extended Remix); B.o.B (featuring Bruno Mars) – "Nothin' on You"; Kesha – "Tik Tok"; Katy Perry (featuring Snoop Dogg) – "California Gurls"	
2011	Britney Spears	"Till the World Ends"	Adele – "Rolling in the Deep"; Bruno Mars – "Grenade"; Katy Perry – "Last Friday Night (T.G.I.F.)"; Pitbull (featuring Ne-Yo, Nayer and Afrojack) – "Give Me Everything"	
2012	One Direction	"What Makes You Beautiful"	Justin Bieber – "Boyfriend"; fun. (featuring Janelle Monáe) – "We Are Young"; Maroon 5 (featuring Wiz Khalifa) – "Payphone"; Rihanna (featuring Calvin Harris) – "We Found Love"	
2013	Selena Gomez	"Come & Get It"	Miley Cyrus – "We Can't Stop"; fun. – "Carry On"; Bruno Mars – "Locked Out of Heaven"; Justin Timberlake – "Mirrors"	
2014	Ariana Grande (featuring Iggy Azalea)	"Problem"	Avicii (featuring Aloe Blacc) – "Wake Me Up"; Iggy Azalea (featuring Charli XCX) – "Fancy"; Jason Derulo (featuring 2 Chainz) – "Talk Dirty"; Pharrell Williams – "Happy"	
2015	Taylor Swift	"Blank Space"	Beyoncé – "7/11"; Maroon 5 – "Sugar"; Mark Ronson (featuring Bruno Mars) – "Uptown Funk"; Ed Sheeran – "Thinking Out Loud"	
2016	Beyoncé	"Formation"	Adele – "Hello"; Justin Bieber – "Sorry"; Alessia Cara – "Wild Things"; Ariana Grande – "Into You"	
2017	Fifth Harmony (featuring Gucci Mane)	"Down"	Miley Cyrus – "Malibu"; Shawn Mendes – "Treat You Better"; Katy Perry (featuring Skip Marley) – "Chained to the Rhythm"; Ed Sheeran – "Shape of You"; Harry Styles – "Sign of the Times"	
2018	Ariana Grande	"No Tears Left to Cry"	Camila Cabello (featuring Young Thug) – "Havana"; Demi Lovato – "Sorry Not Sorry"; Shawn Mendes – "In My Blood"; P!nk – "What About Us"; Ed Sheeran – "Perfect"	
2019	Jonas Brothers	"Sucker"	5 Seconds of Summer – "Easier"; Cardi B and Bruno Mars – "Please Me"; Billie Eilish – "bad guy"; Ariana Grande – "thank u, next"; Khalid – "Talk"; Taylor Swift – "You Need to Calm Down"	

=== 2020s ===
Recipients
Year	Winner(s)	Video	Nominees	Ref.
2020	BTS	"On"	Justin Bieber (featuring Quavo) – "Intentions"; Halsey – "You Should Be Sad"; Jonas Brothers – "What a Man Gotta Do"; Lady Gaga with Ariana Grande – "Rain on Me"; Taylor Swift – "Lover"	
2021	Justin Bieber (featuring Daniel Caesar and Giveon)	"Peaches"	BTS – "Butter"; Billie Eilish – "Therefore I Am"; Ariana Grande – "Positions"; Shawn Mendes – "Wonder"; Olivia Rodrigo – "Good 4 U"; Harry Styles – "Treat People with Kindness"; Taylor Swift – "Willow"	
2022	Harry Styles	"As It Was"	Doja Cat – "Woman"; Billie Eilish – "Happier Than Ever"; Lizzo – "About Damn Time"; Olivia Rodrigo – "Traitor"; Ed Sheeran – "Shivers"	
2023	Taylor Swift	"Anti-Hero"	Miley Cyrus – "Flowers"; Dua Lipa – "Dance the Night"; Demi Lovato – "Swine"; P!nk – "Trustfall"; Olivia Rodrigo – "Vampire"; Ed Sheeran – "Eyes Closed"	
2024	Taylor Swift	—N/a	Camila Cabello; Sabrina Carpenter; Dua Lipa; Tate McRae; Olivia Rodrigo	
2025	Ariana Grande	Brighter Days Ahead	Alex Warren – "Ordinary"; Ed Sheeran – "Sapphire"; Lady Gaga and Bruno Mars – "Die with a Smile"; Rosé and Bruno Mars – "APT."; Sabrina Carpenter – "Manchild"	
2026	Lisa (featuring Kentaro Sakaguchi)	"Dream"	Ariana Grande – "Hate That I Made You Love Me"; Charli XCX – "SS26"; Olivia Rodrigo – "Drop Dead"; Sabrina Carpenter – "House Tour"; Tate McRae – "Nobody's Girl"; Taylor Swift – "The Fate of Ophelia"	

== Statistics ==
=== Artists with multiple wins ===
3 wins

- Taylor Swift
- Britney Spears
- Ariana Grande

2 wins

- No Doubt
- NSYNC

=== Artists with multiple nominations ===
8 nominations

- Ariana Grande

7 nominations

- Britney Spears
- Taylor Swift

6 nominations

- Ed Sheeran
- Bruno Mars

5 nominations

- P!nk
- Olivia Rodrigo

4 nominations

- Justin Bieber
- Christina Aguilera
- Beyoncé
- NSYNC
- Lady Gaga

3 nominations

- Billie Eilish
- No Doubt
- Katy Perry
- Jonas Brothers
- Harry Styles
- Miley Cyrus
- Sabrina Carpenter

== See also ==
- MTV Europe Music Award for Best Pop
