= Goodbye to You (Michelle Branch song) =

2002 single by Michelle Branch

Single by Michelle Branch

from the album The Spirit Room
- B-side: "Everywhere" (acoustic)
- Released: July 8, 2002
- Studio: Sunset Sound; Henson; Ananda (Hollywood, California)
- Length: 4:11 (album version); 3:52 (radio remix)
- Label: Maverick
- Songwriter(s): Michelle Branch
- Producer(s): John Shanks

Michelle Branch singles chronology
"All You Wanted" (2002)	"Goodbye to You" (2002)	"The Game of Love" (2002)

"Goodbye to You" is a song written and performed by American singer-songwriter Michelle Branch for her debut studio album, The Spirit Room (2001). It was released by Maverick Records as the album's third and final single on July 8, 2002. The song reached number 21 on the US Billboard Hot 100 and number 32 in New Zealand.

== Composition ==
"Goodbye to You" is a ballad written solely by Michelle Branch about the feeling of breaking up. It was first recorded for her debut album, Broken Bracelet, and was later re-recorded for inclusion on her follow-up and major-label debut, The Spirit Room. The latter recording was produced by John Shanks and was described by Elle as a "rousing torch song." For its commercial release as a radio single, "Goodbye to You" was remixed by Chris Lord-Alge.

According to the digital sheet music published by Alfred Publishing Co., Inc., the song was composed in the key of A♭ major and is set in common time to a moderately slow tempo of 80 beats per minute.

== Chart performance ==
"Goodbye to You" peaked at number 21 on the US Billboard Hot 100 on the week ending October 26, 2002. The song stayed on the charts for 20 weeks. The song became Branch's third top-40 hit.

== Music video ==
The music video depicts Branch at a beach in her car, driving away from her troubles, and singing towards the ocean. It was directed by Francis Lawrence. The video's story is set in reverse and Branch has said that the format is supposed to emulate the 2000 film Memento.

== Track listing ==
German CD single

1. "Goodbye to You" (radio remix) – 3:48
2. "Everywhere" (acoustic version) – 3:36

== Credits and personnel ==
Credits are lifted from The Spirit Room album booklet.

Studios

- Recorded at Sunset Sound, Henson Recording Studios, and Ananda Studios (Hollywood, California)
- Mixed at Westlake Audio (Los Angeles)
- Mastered at Marcussen Mastering (Los Angeles)

Personnel

- Michelle Branch – writing, guitars, keyboards
- John Shanks – guitars, bass, keyboards, programming, production
- Patrick Warren – keyboards
- Kenny Aronoff – drums
- Vinnie Colaiuta – drums
- Lars Fox – programming, engineering, Pro Tools editing
- Marc DeSisto – mixing, engineering
- Stephen Marcussen – mastering

== Charts ==
=== Weekly charts ===
Chart (2002)	Peak position
Netherlands (Dutch Top 40 Tipparade)	8
Netherlands (Single Top 100)	79
New Zealand (Recorded Music NZ)	32
US Billboard Hot 100	21
US Adult Pop Airplay (Billboard)	15
US Pop Airplay (Billboard)	11

=== Year-end charts ===
Chart (2002)	Position
US Adult Top 40 (Billboard)	40
US Mainstream Top 40 (Billboard)	53

Chart (2003)	Position
US Adult Top 40 (Billboard)	76

== In popular culture ==
- In 2001, Branch appeared in the Buffy the Vampire Slayer episode "Tabula Rasa", singing "Goodbye to You" in the Bronze at the conclusion of the episode and the song was also heard in the promos for Season 7.
- She also appeared on Charmed also performing "Goodbye to You" at Piper Haliwell's club P3 in the 2003 episode "Centennial Charmed".
- The song was used in a 2004 episode of MTV's Laguna Beach: The Real Orange County.
- In 2009 the song was used as a final dance song for the couples eliminated from America's version of Dancing with the Stars.
- On the series finale of The Hills, the song was featured in a montage showcasing the turbulent romance of Justin Bobby and Audrina Patridge.
- In May 2016, Branch performed "Goodbye Ted Cruz," a reworking of the song, on Full Frontal with Samantha Bee, in order to commemorate Ted Cruz's dropping out of the 2016 presidential race.
