= Breathe (Michelle Branch song) =

2003 single by Michelle Branch

- US maxi single artwork

Single by Michelle Branch

from the album Hotel Paper
- B-side: "'Till I Get Over You" (acoustic live); "Desperately" (acoustic live)
- Released: September 22, 2003
- Length: 3:32
- Label: Maverick
- Songwriters: Michelle Branch; John Shanks
- Producer: John Shanks

Michelle Branch singles chronology
"Are You Happy Now?" (2003)	"Breathe" (2003)	"'Til I Get Over You" (2004)

"Breathe" is a song by American singer Michelle Branch. It was released on September 22, 2003, in the United States as the second single from her second studio album, Hotel Paper (2003). The song peaked at No. 36 on the US Billboard Hot 100 in December 2003 and reached number 45 in Australia.

== Chart performance ==
"Breathe" peaked at number 36 on the US Billboard Hot 100 on the week ending December 13, 2003. The song stayed on the chart for 18 weeks and became Branch's sixth top-40 hit.

== Music video ==
Directed by Marc Klasfeld, the video shows Branch playing with her band inside a house. Bit by bit, the house, as well as everything in it, begins to dissolve, revealing a sunny beach outside. Eventually, Branch tosses her guitar out to sea and she and her band finish playing at the beach.

== Track listings ==
- US CD maxi-single
1. "Breathe" (album version) – 3:31
2. "Breathe" (The Passengers Tuff Club) – 8:03
3. "Breathe" (Chris Cox Penetrating club mix) – 8:56
4. "Breathe" (Sean Konnery Resportator club mix) - 6:57
5. "Breathe" (Dave Hernandez club mix) – 7:26
6. "Breathe" (High Bias radio mix) – 3:46
7. "Breathe" (The Passengerz Tuff Radio) – 3:59
8. "Breathe" (Sean Konnery Resportator radio edit) – 4:10
- Australian CD single
1. "Breathe"
2. "'Till I Get Over You" (acoustic live)
3. "Desperately" (acoustic live)

== Charts ==
=== Weekly charts ===
Chart (2003–2004)	Peak position
Australia (ARIA)	45
US Billboard Hot 100	36
US Adult Contemporary (Billboard)	27
US Adult Pop Airplay (Billboard)	13
US Dance Club Songs (Billboard) Remixes	3
US Dance Singles Sales (Billboard) Remixes	2
US Pop Airplay (Billboard)	18

=== Year-end charts ===
Chart (2003)	Position
US Adult Top 40 (Billboard)	79

Chart (2004)	Position
US Adult Top 40 (Billboard)	43
US Dance Singles Sales (Billboard)	10
US Mainstream Top 40 (Billboard)	86

== Release history ==
Region	Date	Format(s)	Label(s)	Ref.
United States	September 22, 2003	Contemporary hit; hot adult contemporary radio	Maverick	
Australia	November 10, 2003	CD	Maverick	
United States	November 25, 2003	CD	Maverick	

== In popular culture ==
- "Breathe" is featured in the trailers for P.S. I Love You, Sex and the City, The Prince and Me, and 13 Going on 30.
- "Breathe" is featured on an episode of MTV's The Girls of Hedsor Hall and the Sex and the City episode, "The Catch".
