= Everywhere (Michelle Branch song) =

2001 single by Michelle Branch

Single by Michelle Branch

from the album The Spirit Room
- B-side: "All You Wanted" (unplugged); "Goodbye to You" (unplugged)
- Released: June 11, 2001
- Recorded: January–February 2001
- Studio: Sunset Sound; Henson; Ananda (Hollywood, California)
- Genre: Pop rock; post-grunge
- Length: 3:36
- Label: Maverick
- Songwriters: Michelle Branch; John Shanks; Matt Bronleewe; Tiffany Arbuckle Lee
- Producer: John Shanks

Michelle Branch singles chronology
"Everywhere" (2001)	"All You Wanted" (2002)

Music video
- "Everywhere" on YouTube

"Everywhere" is a song by American singer-songwriter Michelle Branch, co-written by Branch and American record producer John Shanks, who also produced the track. "Everywhere" is a pop rock song with ambiguous lyrics about having a crush on someone, with several music critics having compared the song's composition to works by Canadian singer Alanis Morissette. Branch originally wrote the song in a more acoustic form, but at Shanks' suggestion, she recorded a more up-tempo version of the track in January and February 2001. "Everywhere" was released on June 11, 2001, in the United States as Branch's debut single and the lead single from her first major-label studio album, The Spirit Room (2001). The single was also released in Australia, Europe, and Japan throughout 2001 and 2002.

"Everywhere" received positive reviews from music critics, who called it a standout track from The Spirit Room due to its lively composition and catchy lyrics. The track has also aged well, with retrospective reviews giving similar praise to the song's composition and its chorus being ranked the 77th greatest of the 21st century by Billboard magazine in 2017. Commercially, "Everywhere" peaked at number 12 on the US Billboard Hot 100, reached the top 20 in Australia and the United Kingdom, and achieved top-five placings in the Netherlands and New Zealand. A music video directed by Liz Friedlander was also created for the single, featuring Branch stalking a man in an apartment building. The video won the Viewer's Choice Award at the 2002 MTV Video Music Awards. "Everywhere" remains Branch's most well-known song.

== Background and release ==
Living with her parents in Sedona, Arizona, Michelle Branch wrote "Everywhere" when she was 15 years old, originally composing it as an acoustic love song. After she turned 17, Danny Strick, the executive A&R manager of Maverick Records, saw her performing as an opening act for pop rock band Hanson. Noticing that the crowd responded well to her music, he decided to sign her to the label in July 2000. She then played the song for John Shanks, who agreed to produce the track, and they recorded it from January to February 2001 at three studios in Hollywood, California: Sunset Sound, Henson Recording Studios, and Ananda Studios. Additional musicians who contributed to the song include keyboardist Patrick Warren and drummers Kenny Aronoff and Vinnie Colaiuta.

Once Branch finished recording "Everywhere", Maverick promoted the track on US hot adult contemporary and modern adult contemporary radio, where the song was officially serviced on June 11, 2001. On July 10, eight days after Branch's 18th birthday, it was serviced to contemporary hit radio. The Spirit Room was released on August 14, 2001, on which the song appears as the opening track. In Australia, "Everywhere" was released as a CD single on September 24, 2001, through Maverick and Warner Music Australia. This CD contains acoustic versions of Branch's future singles "All You Wanted" and "Goodbye to You". In Japan, Warner Music Japan released the song as a double A-side with the original version of "All You Wanted" on January 23, 2002. Three months later, on April 1, 2002, Maverick issued the single across Europe and in the United Kingdom. In the UK, it was released on CD and cassette. The CD contains the acoustic versions of "All You Wanted" and "Everywhere" plus an enhanced element featuring the song's video, and the cassette contains the acoustic version of "Goodbye to You" only. The European CD single features the same tracks as the UK cassette.

== Composition ==
"Everywhere" (2001)
A 21-second sample of "Everywhere", illustrating its pop-rock sound. Michelle Branch intentionally left the romantic lyrics ambiguous, as she did not write the song from her own experiences and wanted her listeners to form their own interpretations.

The original version of "Everywhere" was written by Branch alone, while Shanks, who produced the track, provided additional writing for the final recording. A vocally fervent love song, the track is written in common time with a moderate tempo of 98 beats per minute and was composed in the key of D♭ major. According to Branch, she wrote the chorus a half step lower than the album version with falsetto vocals, but Shanks convinced her to raise the tone and sing as vigorously as she could. Stephanie Garr of online magazine The Dowsers described the song's essence as a combination of "moody post-grunge rock and breezy Y2K pop" and likened Branch's vocals to an optimistic Alanis Morissette, who was also signed to Maverick.

The lyrical content of the song, described by Billboard as "ultra-romantic", was left intentionally ambiguous by Branch, who did not write the song from personal experience. In 2001, Branch told MTV that she prefers her songs having ambiguous themes so that anyone can relate to it without recalling specific events. The song's hook was described by Patrick Crowley of Billboard as a "beast of a glossy pop-rock hook" and responsible for the song's catchiness. Branch later commented that the she had written better refrains since then but remains proud of her work. In retrospective comments, Branch said that the material of her first two albums, including "Everywhere", is "hopelessly romantic" compared with her later work and composed of "a lot of [...] teenage rhyme".

== Critical reception ==
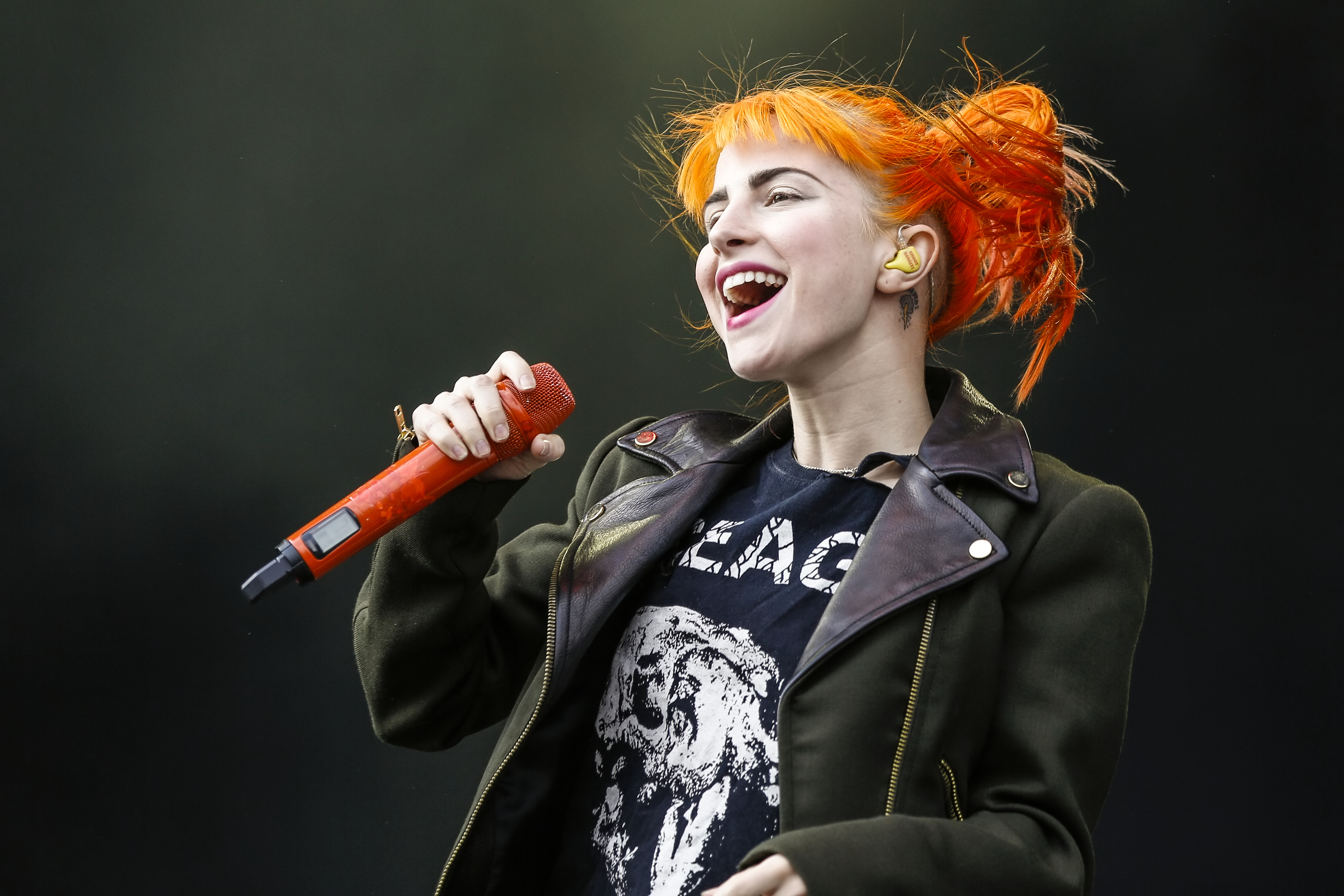
One music critic noted that "Everywhere" served as an influence for future female pop stars, including Hayley Williams of Paramore (pictured in 2013).

Billboard editor Chuck Taylor likened the song to a "shot of tequila" when compared with other pop music of the time, praising its mood, lyrics, and production. Chris Edge of Raleigh-Durham radio station WDCG said that the track conveys Branch's passion through its "incredible hook" and lyrics and praised its relatability. In Hasselt, Belgium, FM Limburg head of music Sandra Boussu labeled the track "cool and hip", comparing Branch to Morissette and Dutch singer Sita. AllMusic's Liana Jonas described the song "a lively and heartfelt song with electric-guitar power chords, spirited vocal delivery, and catchy chorus". Sputnikmusic reviewed the song, calling it the album's standout track. IGN Music called the song "definitely catchy". Sean Richardson of the Boston Phoenix described the song's intro as "glossy", going on to label the chorus as "unforgettable dream-pop" and comparing the track to Vanessa Carlton's debut single, "A Thousand Miles". British chart commentator James Masterton wrote that the song charted in the UK on its own merits and noted Branch's "tremendous" voice as well as the "uplifting" lyrics.

Retrospectively, in 2017, Billboard ranked the song's chorus as the 77th-best of the 21st century, referring to the second half as a "testament" to the entire refrain. Garr noted that "Everywhere" marked the end of the "'90s angst" era and served as an influence for future female pop stars such as Kelly Clarkson, KT Tunstall, Sara Bareilles, and Hayley Williams of Paramore. In September 2022, Emily Yahr of The Washington Post commented on the song's nostalgia factor, writing that it "transport[s] a significant portion of the population back to the simpler times of watching MTV after school, dramatic AIM away messages and piling friends into a car fresh off getting a driver's license and cranking up the radio".

== Chart performance ==
On the US Billboard Hot 100, "Everywhere" debuted at number 62 on September 1, 2001, becoming that week's highest-charting new song. Ten weeks later, on November 10, the song peaked at number 12, giving Branch her first of four top-20 singles in the US. The song spent a total of 20 weeks on the Hot 100, last charting at number 63 on January 7, 2002. On other Billboard charts, the song achieved its highest position on the Mainstream Top 40, where it peaked at number five and spent 26 weeks on the ranking. The song also reached the top 10 on the Adult Top 40 and Top 40 Tracks listings, reaching numbers nine and six, respectively. The track appeared on the Adult Top 40 year-end chart for 2001, ranking in at number 26. In Canada, the song became a top-10 hit on contemporary hit radio, peaking at number nine on the Nielsen BDS chart.

In Australia, "Everywhere" debuted at number 100 on the ARIA Singles Chart in November 2001, rising into the top 50 on January 13, 2002. In late March, the song rose into the top 20 and peaked at number 19, becoming Branch's highest-charting single in Australia and staying inside the top 50 for 15 weeks. At the end of 2002, the Australian Recording Industry Association (ARIA) ranked the song at number 87 on their year-end chart. In New Zealand, the single first appeared at number 45 on the RIANZ Singles Chart in November 2001. Over the next six weeks, the track rose up the top 50, eventually peaking at number two on December 16. Spending 16 weeks within the top 50, it remains Branch's highest-charting single in New Zealand. Recorded Music NZ awarded the song a gold certification in 2022 for sales and streams exceeding 15,000 units.

"Everywhere" also charted in several European countries, achieving a peak of number 84 on the Eurochart Hot 100 in April 2002. In the United Kingdom, the single debuted and peaked at number 18 on the UK Singles Chart the same month, totaling six weeks in the top 100. It is Branch's second-highest-peaking single in the UK, after "The Game of Love", her collaboration with rock band Santana. On the Netherlands' Dutch Top 40 chart, "Everywhere" became a top-five hit, reaching number five in March 2002, while on the country's Single Top 100 chart, it reached number 28. According to the Dutch Top 40, "Everywhere" was the Netherlands' 84th-best-performing hit of 2002. In Italy, the track reached number 28 on the FIMI Singles Chart. Elsewhere in Europe, the single peaked at number 46 in Switzerland and charted below the top 50 in France, Germany, Sweden, and Switzerland.

== Music video ==
In this scene from the music video, Branch hangs an instant photograph of her love interest on the wall. Branch later described her character as a "peeping tom".

The music video for "Everywhere" was directed by Liz Friedlander and was filmed after the song began broadcasting on radio. The video shows Branch spying on a man in the opposite apartment building while she takes several photographs of him and plays her guitar in an empty room. The man also glimpses back at her, and at the end of the video, the two finally meet. Branch was involved in the selection of the actor portraying her love interest; she told MTV in a 2001 interview that when the producers showed her a photo of Jake Muxworthy, she told them, "This is it. He has to be in it." Playing opposite Muxworthy proved to be difficult for Branch, who had a "little crush" on him.

Branch would later describe her character as a "creep" and "stalker-y" and compared the video to the film Rear Window and "an Urban Outfitters commercial", but also commented, "I don't think I would change anything about that video." The video aired on Fox Family, Nickelodeon, and VH1 before its intended release date, and it was also popular on MTV's Total Request Live, where Branch performed the song live on August 24, 2001. At the 2002 MTV Video Music Awards, the video won the Viewer's Choice Award.

== Formats and track listings ==
Australian maxi-CD single

1. "Everywhere" – 3:36
2. "All You Wanted" (unplugged version) – 3:36
3. "Goodbye to You" (unplugged version) – 4:09

UK CD single

1. "Everywhere" – 3:36
2. "All You Wanted" (unplugged version) – 3:36
3. "Goodbye to You" (unplugged version) – 4:09
4. "Everywhere" (promotional video)

UK cassette single and European CD single

1. "Everywhere" – 3:36
2. "Goodbye to You" (unplugged version) – 4:09

Japanese CD single – "All You Wanted" / "Everywhere"

1. "All You Wanted" – 3:38
2. "Everywhere" – 3:36
3. "Goodbye to You" (unplugged version) – 4:09

== Credits and personnel ==
Credits are adapted from The Spirit Room album booklet.

Studios

- Recorded at Sunset Sound, Henson Recording Studios, and Ananda Studios (Hollywood, California)
- Mixed at Image Recorders (Hollywood, California)
- Mastered at Marcussen Mastering (Los Angeles)

Personnel

- Michelle Branch – writing, guitars, keyboards
- John Shanks – writing, guitars, bass, keyboards, programming, production
- Patrick Warren – keyboards
- Kenny Aronoff – drums
- Vinnie Colaiuta – drums
- Lars Fox – programming, engineering, Pro Tools editing
- Chris Lord-Alge – mixing
- Marc DeSisto – engineering
- Stephen Marcussen – mastering

== Charts ==
=== Weekly charts ===
Weekly chart performance for "Everywhere"
Chart (2001–2002)	Peak position
Australia (ARIA)	19
Belgium (Ultratip Bubbling Under Flanders)	2
Canada CHR (Nielsen BDS)	9
Europe (Eurochart Hot 100)	84
France (SNEP)	60
Germany (GfK)	90
Netherlands (Dutch Top 40)	5
Netherlands (Single Top 100)	28
New Zealand (Recorded Music NZ)	2
Italy (FIMI)	28
Scotland Singles (OCC)	15
Switzerland (Schweizer Hitparade)	46
Sweden (Sverigetopplistan)	51
UK Singles (OCC)	18
US Billboard Hot 100	12
US Adult Pop Airplay (Billboard)	9
US Pop Airplay (Billboard)	5
US Top 40 Tracks (Billboard)	6

=== Year-end charts ===
2001 year-end chart performance for "Everywhere"
Chart (2001)	Position
US Adult Top 40 (Billboard)	26
US Mainstream Top 40 (Billboard)	43

2002 year-end chart performance for "Everywhere"
Chart (2002)	Position
Australia (ARIA)	87
Netherlands (Dutch Top 40)	84
US Adult Top 40 (Billboard)	97
US Mainstream Top 40 (Billboard)	95

== Certifications ==
Certifications and sales for "Everywhere"
Region	Certification	Certified units/sales
New Zealand (RMNZ)	Gold	15,000^{‡}
^{‡} Sales+streaming figures based on certification alone.

== Release history ==
Release dates and formats for "Everywhere"
Region	Date	Format(s)	Label(s)	Ref.
United States	June 11, 2001	Hot adult contemporary; modern adult contemporary radio	Maverick	
United States	July 10, 2001	Contemporary hit radio	Maverick	
Australia	September 24, 2001	CD	Maverick; Warner Music Australia	
Japan	January 23, 2002	CD with "All You Wanted"	Warner Music Japan	
Europe	April 1, 2002	CD	Maverick	
United Kingdom	April 1, 2002	CD; cassette	Maverick	
