= Jeff Rabhan =

American music industry executive (born 1970)

- Born: Jeffrey S. Rabhan; Savannah, Georgia, U.S.
- Occupations: Artist manager, music executive, consultant, academic
- Writing career
- Years active: 1992–present

Jeffrey S. Rabhan is an American entrepreneur, journalist, and former music executive and artist manager. Since 2024, Rabhan has served as founder and CEO of an education company, Bored-of-Ed.com. Previously, Rabhan was a journalist for multiple music magazines before working as an artist manager. He also served as an arts professor and chair of the Clive Davis Institute of Recorded Music at New York University from 2010 until 2021.

== Early life ==
Rabhan was born in Savannah, Georgia and raised in Richmond, Virginia. He received a BA in journalism from New York University.

== Career ==
Following his graduation, Rabhan pursued music journalism, serving in staff positions at both Rolling Stone and SPIN before being named to West Coast positions as senior director of A&R at Atlantic Records, executive in charge of soundtracks at Elektra Records, and an independent music supervisor and A&R consultant, most notably bringing pop trio Hanson to Mercury Records in 1996 and serving as music supervisor on the 1996 slasher film Scream. Credited with discovering Michelle Branch, he managed Branch, DMX, Lil Kim, and Kelly Clarkson while serving as a partner at The Firm, Inc.

In 2006, he co-founded the management company Three Ring Projects, which had publishing and label imprints through Universal Music Group. He managed artists including Elliott Yamin of American Idol, Kelly Rowland, Everlast, Kelis and Jermaine Dupri.

In 2010, he was named chair of the Clive Davis Institute of Recorded Music at Tisch School of the Arts. In February 2013, his book Cool Jobs in the Music Business, which outlines career options in the music industry for high school and college students, was published by InTune. Rabhan left NYU in 2021 to partner with songwriting/producer duo Stargate to launch the Los Angeles Academy of Artists and Music Production (LAAMP), where he served as Executive Director. At the end of the first year of the program, Rabhan returned to New York and launched Bored-of-Ed.com.

In 2025, following Chappell Roan's Grammy acceptance speech during which she said that record companies owed musicians a "livable wage" and health care, Rabhan wrote an op-ed for The Hollywood Reporter. In the op-ed, he wrote that record labels were not legally responsible for artists beyond paying advances and royalties, and that Roan was "disingenuous" and "wildly misinformed" for demanding labels pay artists a "livable wage". Though the article, which went viral, generated considerable attention and controversy, Rabhan stood by his initial statements.
