= The Game of Love (Santana song) =

2002 single by Santana

Single by Santana featuring Michelle Branch

from the album Shaman and Hotel Paper (international version)
- B-side: "Come to My World"; "Curacion"
- Released: September 23, 2002
- Length: 4:18
- Label: Arista; BMG
- Songwriters: Alex Ander; Rick Nowels
- Producers: Alex Ander; Rick Nowels; Carlos Santana; Clive Davis

Santana singles chronology
"Primavera" (2001)	"The Game of Love" (2002)	"Nothing at All" (2003)

Michelle Branch singles chronology
"Goodbye to You" (2002)	"The Game of Love" (2002)	"Are You Happy Now?" (2003)

"The Game of Love" is a song by American rock band Santana from their 19th studio album, Shaman (2002). The vocal performance on the song is by Michelle Branch. It was composed by Gregg Alexander (as Alex Ander) and Rick Nowels. The song was released as a single on September 23, 2002, and won a Grammy Award for Best Pop Collaboration with Vocals. Commercially, "The Game of Love" peaked at number five on the US Billboard Hot 100 chart and topped the Billboard Adult Contemporary chart, becoming that ranking's most successful track of 2003. The song additionally reached the top 10 in Canada, New Zealand, Nicaragua, Panama, and seven European countries.

== Background ==
The song had originally been recorded with New Radicals frontman Gregg Alexander, but album producer Clive Davis felt a female voice would maximize the song's appeal and a recording of Santana performing "The Game of Love" with Tina Turner as vocalist was completed. When Turner declined to participate in making a video for the track, Davis recruited Macy Gray to record a replacement vocal. When Davis was not satisfied with that version, Michelle Branch was asked to record the song, with Branch's rhythm guitar playing also added to the track. Branch said, "It was the first time for me to sing somebody else's song. Usually I'm like: 'Oh I want it this way' and I'm in charge...I didn't meet [Carlos Santana at the recording session], I didn't know what was going on...It felt to me like wow it seems like there's so much at stake, I'm going to go in there and just sing my heart out and just cross my fingers."

The Tina Turner version of "The Game of Love" was issued on the 2007 retrospective Ultimate Santana. Santana said "There's only one Tina Turner...No one can hit a note like Tina Turner...I love Michelle [Branch] and she did a great interpretation of it. It's just that with all honor and respect to Michelle, there's the girl and there's the woman, and Michelle is unfolding into a woman...but it takes time to go from a girl into a woman." In 2026, as part of Branch's Everywhere and Back Again EP celebrating her 25-year music career, she released a duet version of the song with Alexander.

== Chart performance ==
"The Game of Love" peaked at number five on the US Billboard Hot 100 on the week ending November 30, 2002. The song stayed on the charts for 37 weeks. The song became Santana's fifth top-10 hit and Branch's second top-10 hit, as well as her highest-peaking single.

== Music video ==
The music video depicts Santana and Branch in an alley with couples around them, each expressing their love for one another. It was directed by Paul Fedor and filmed in the Pilsen neighborhood of Chicago.

== Track listings ==
US CD single

1. "The Game of Love" (radio mix) – 4:18
2. "The Game of Love" (instrumental) – 4:18

European CD and cassette single

1. "The Game of Love" (radio mix) – 4:18
2. "Come to My World" – 4:11

European and Australian maxi-CD single

1. "The Game of Love" (radio mix) – 4:18
2. "Come to My World" – 4:11
3. "Curacion" – 4:47
4. "The Game of Love" (video)

== Credits and personnel ==
Credits are taken from the European CD single liner notes.

Studios

- Mixed at Larrabee North Studios (North Hollywood, California, US)
- Engineered at the Big Space (Santa Monica, California, US) and Fantasy Studios (Berkeley, California, US)

Personnel

- Alex Ander – writing, production
- Rick Nowels – writing, background vocals, acoustic guitar, keyboards, production
- Carlos Santana – lead guitar, horn arrangements, album production
- Michelle Branch – lead vocals, background vocals
- Andy Vargas – additional vocals
- Tony Lindsay – additional vocals
- Niki Haris – background vocals
- Siedah Garrett – background vocals
- Rusty Anderson – additional electric guitar
- Chester Thompson – piano, organ
- Benny Rietveld – bass
- Brian Collier – drums
- Wayne Rodrigues – drum programming
- Raul Rekow – congas
- Karl Perazzo – percussion
- Louis Conte – additional percussion
- Bill Ortiz – trumpet, horn arrangements
- Julius Melendez – trumpet
- Jeff Cressman – trombone, horn arrangements
- Martin Wehner – trombone
- Ben Conrad – engineering
- Chris Garcia – engineering
- Randy Wine – engineering
- Greg Collins – engineering
- Michael Rosen – engineering
- Scott Holderby – engineering
- Eddie Kramer – engineering
- Tone – engineering
- Kieron Menzies – engineering assistance
- Alan Veucosovic – engineering assistance
- Manny Marroquin – mixing
- Kirstin Johnson – project coordination for Ander and Nowels
- Robert Cappadona – project coordination for Ander and Nowels
- Clive Davis – album production
- Antonio "LA" Reid – executive production

== Charts ==
=== Weekly charts ===
Original version

Weekly chart performance for "The Game of Love"
Chart (2002–2003)	Peak position
Australia (ARIA)	21
Austria (Ö3 Austria Top 40)	51
Belgium (Ultratip Bubbling Under Flanders)	2
Belgium (Ultratip Bubbling Under Wallonia)	5
Canada (Nielsen SoundScan)	4
Croatia (HRT)	9
Czech Republic (IFPI CR)	7
Europe (Eurochart Hot 100)	37
Germany (GfK)	46
Greece (IFPI)	10
Hungary (Rádiós Top 40)	8
Hungary (Single Top 40)	9
Ireland (IRMA)	19
Italy (FIMI)	11
Netherlands (Dutch Top 40)	23
Netherlands (Single Top 100)	40
New Zealand (Recorded Music NZ)	7
Nicaragua (Notimex)	4
Norway (VG-lista)	17
Panama (Notimex)	5
Portugal (AFP)	4
Romania (Romanian Top 100)	7
Scottish Singles Sales (Official Charts)	12
Spain (Promusicae)	6
Sweden (Sverigetopplistan)	54
Switzerland (Schweizer Hitparade)	20
UK Singles (Official Charts)	16
US Billboard Hot 100	5
US Adult Alternative Airplay (Billboard)	16
US Adult Contemporary (Billboard)	1
US Adult Pop Airplay (Billboard)	1
US Pop Airplay (Billboard)	5

2026 version with New Radicals

Weekly chart performance for the 2026 version of "The Game of Love"
Chart (2026)	Peak position
US Adult Contemporary (Billboard)	27
US Adult Pop Airplay (Billboard)	11

=== Year-end charts ===
2002 year-end chart performance for "The Game of Love"
Chart (2002)	Position
Brazil (Crowley)	54
Canada (Nielsen SoundScan)	78
US Adult Top 40 (Billboard)	39
US Adult Contemporary (Billboard)	48
US Mainstream Top 40 (Billboard)	75

2003 year-end chart performance for "The Game of Love"
Chart (2003)	Position
Romania (Romanian Top 100)	83
US Billboard Hot 100	27
US Adult Contemporary (Billboard)	1
US Adult Top 40 (Billboard)	8
US Mainstream Top 40 (Billboard)	52

== Certifications ==
Certifications for "The Game of Love"
Region	Certification	Certified units/sales
New Zealand (RMNZ)	Gold	15,000^{‡}
^{‡} Sales+streaming figures based on certification alone.

== Release history ==
Release dates and formats for "The Game of Love"
Region	Date	Format(s)	Label(s)	Ref.
United States	September 23, 2002	Contemporary hit; hot AC; triple A radio	Arista	
Australia	November 11, 2002	CD	Artista; BMG	
United Kingdom	November 11, 2002	CD	Artista; BMG	

== Michelle Branch and New Radicals version ==
"The Game of Love"

Single by Michelle Branch featuring New Radicals

from the album Everywhere and Back Again
- Released: 2026
- Length: 4:07
- Songwriters: Alex Ander; Rick Nowels

Michelle Branch singles chronology
"Not My Lover" (2022)	"The Game of Love" (2026)

New Radicals singles chronology
"One Night Only (Break Loose Break Free!)" (2026)	"The Game of Love" (2026)

In 2026, Michelle Branch recorded a new version of the song with the song's writer and original vocalist, Gregg Alexander, with Gregg Alexander being credited as "New Radicals". The single was released as part of her "Everywhere and Back Again EP", which celebrates Branch's 25 years in the music industry.

=== Composition ===
The song deviates from the opening found in the original Santana version and borrows the opening from New Radicals own 1998 composition You Get What You Give by including a "1, 2, 1, 2, 3, 4" chant as well as similar instrumentation before Gregg Alexander starts singing. The song also deviates from the Santana version by turning it into a vocal duet with both Alexander and Branch sharing lead vocals.

== See also ==
- List of Billboard Adult Contemporary number ones of 2003
