= Goo Goo Dolls discography =

Artist discography

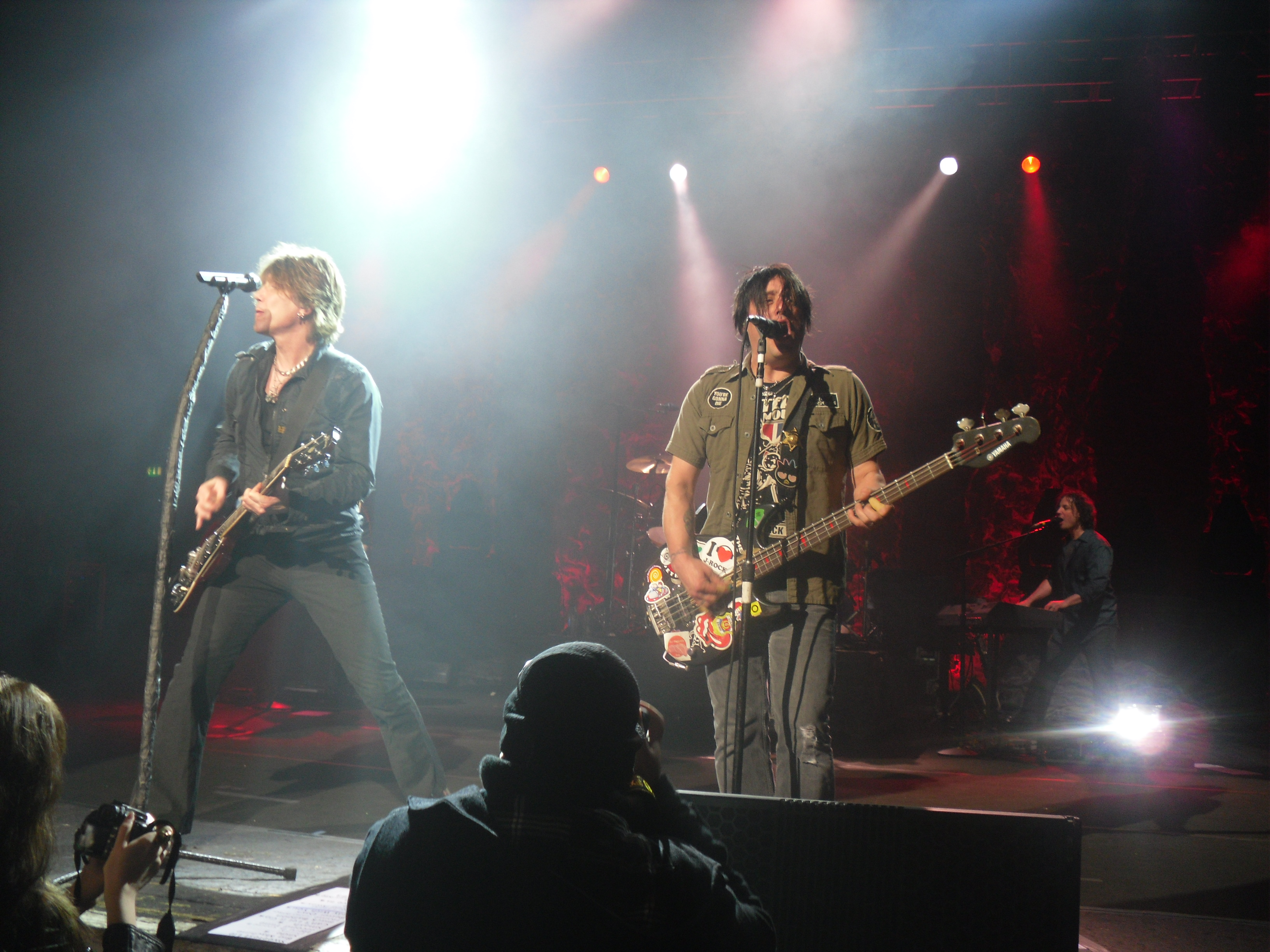
- The Goo Goo Dolls performing in 2010
- Studio albums: 14
- EPs: 13
- Live albums: 5
- Compilation albums: 7
- Singles: 40
- Video albums: 1
- Music videos: 43
- Promotional singles: 7

The discography of American alternative rock band the Goo Goo Dolls consists of 14 studio albums, five live albums, seven compilation albums, nine EPs, 38 singles, one video album, and 43 music videos.

== Discography ==
=== Studio albums ===
Title	Album details	Peak chart positions										Sales	Certifications
Title	Album details	US	AUS	AUT	CAN	GER	IRL	NLD	NZ	SWE	UK	Sales	Certifications
Goo Goo Dolls	Released: June 9, 1987; Label: Mercenary (2102), Celluloid (2211), Metal Blade (14079); Format: CD, CS, LP	—	—	—	—	—	—	—	—	—	—		
Jed	Released: February 22, 1989; Label: Enigma / Death (73406), Metal Blade (14035); Format: CD, CS, LP	—	—	—	—	—	—	—	—	—	—		
Hold Me Up	Released: October 5, 1990; Label: Metal Blade (17018); Format: CD, CS, LP	—	—	—	—	—	—	—	—	—	—		
Superstar Car Wash	Released: February 23, 1993; Label: Metal Blade (45206); Format: CD, CS	— (Note: Superstar Car Wash did not chart on the Billboard 200, but did peak at number 35 on the Heatseekers album chart.)	—	—	—	—	—	—	—	—	—		
A Boy Named Goo	Released: March 14, 1995; Label: Metal Blade (45750) / Warner Bros. (45750-2); Format: CD, CS, LP	27	—	—	15	—	—	—	—	—	—	US: 1,800,000	RIAA: 2× Platinum; MC: Platinum
Dizzy Up the Girl	Released: September 22, 1998; Label: Warner Bros. (47058); Format: CD, CS, LP	15	17	20	4	30	—	38	19	17	47	US: 4,200,000	RIAA: 5× Platinum; ARIA: Platinum; MC: 2× Platinum; BPI: Gold; RMNZ: 2× Platinum
Gutterflower	Released: April 9, 2002; Label: Warner Bros. (48206); Format: CD	4	23	—	8	43	—	—	37	20	56	US: 706,000	RIAA: Gold
Let Love In	Released: April 25, 2006; Label: Warner Bros. (49748); Format: CD	9	—	—	15	—	98	—	—	39	58	US: 506,000	RIAA: Gold; BPI: Silver
Something for the Rest of Us	Released: August 31, 2010; Label: Warner Bros.; Format: CD, DI	7	—	—	20	—	67	—	—	—	36	US: 112,000	
Magnetic	Released: June 11, 2013; Label: Warner Bros.; Format: CD, DI, LP	8	68	—	21	—	—	—	—	—	57		
Boxes	Released: May 6, 2016; Label: Warner Bros.; Format: CD, DI, LP	27	78	—	72	—	—	—	—	—	72	US: 15,000	
Miracle Pill	Released: September 13, 2019; Label: Warner; Format: CD, DI, LP	92	—	—	—	—	—	—	—	—	— (Note: Miracle Pill did not enter the UK Albums Chart, but peaked at number 23 on the UK Album Downloads Chart.)		
It's Christmas All Over	Released: October 30, 2020; Label: Warner; Format: CD, DI, LP	— (Note: It's Christmas All Over did not enter the US Billboard 200, but peaked at number 40 on the US Billboard Album Sales Chart.)	—	—	—	—	—	—	—	—	—		
Chaos in Bloom	Released: August 12, 2022; Label: Warner; Format: CD, DI, LP	— (Note: Chaos in Bloom did not enter the US Billboard 200, but peaked at number 26 on the US Billboard Album Sales Chart.)	— (Note: Chaos in Bloom did not enter the ARIA Albums Chart, but peaked at number 25 on the ARIA Digital Album Chart.)	—	—	—	—	—	—	—	— (Note: Chaos in Bloom did not enter the UK Albums Chart, but peaked at number 26 on the UK Album Downloads Chart.)		
"—" denotes that the recording did not chart or was not released in that territory.

=== Compilation albums ===
Title	Album details	Peak chart positions						Certifications
Title	Album details	US	CAN	HUN	JPN	SCO	UK	Certifications
What I Learned About Ego, Opinion, Art & Commerce	Released: May 29, 2001; Label: Warner Bros. (47945); Format: CD	164	—	—	50	—	—	
iTunes Originals	Released: August 1, 2006; Label: Warner Bros.; Format: DI	—	—	—	—	—	—	
Greatest Hits Volume One: The Singles	Released: November 13, 2007; Label: Warner Bros. (144444); Format: CD, LP	33	46	—	—	75	61	BPI: Gold
Vol. 2	Released: August 19, 2008; Label: Warner Bros. (288252); Format: CD (+DVD)	158	—	—	—	—	—	
Pick Pockets, Petty Thieves, and Tiny Victories (1987–1995)	Released: May 22, 2017; Label: Warner Bros.; Format: LP	—	—	—	—	—	—	
Topography (1998–2013)	Released: April 13, 2019; Label: Warner Bros.; Format: LP	—	—	—	—	—	—	
Rarities	Released: June 25, 2021; Label: Warner Bros.; Formats: CD, LP, DI	— (Note: Rarities did not enter the US Billboard 200, but peaked at number 63 on the US Billboard Album Sales Chart.)	—	27	—	—	—	

=== Extended plays ===
Title	Extended play details
Just the Way You Are	Released: 1991; Label: Warner Bros.; Format: CD
Bang!	Released: September 19, 1997; Label: Warner Bros.; Format: CD
Dizzy	Released: February 5, 1999; Label: Warner Bros. (10062); Format: CD
Platinum Play	Released: 1999; Label: Warner Bros.; Format: CD
Rolling Stone Original	Released: June 20, 2006; Label: Warner Bros.; Format: DI
Waiting for the Rest of It	Released: July 17, 2010; Label: Warner Bros.; Format: CD, DI
iTunes Live from SoHo	Released: July 15, 2011; Label: Warner Bros.; Format: DI
Warner Sound Sessions	Released: April 4, 2014; Label: Warner Bros.; Format: DI
You Should Be Happy	Released: May 12, 2017; Label: Warner Bros.; Format: CD, DI, LP
The Audience Is This Way (Live)	Released: July 21, 2018; Label: Warner Bros.; Format: DI, LP
The Audience Is That Way (The Rest of the Show) [Vol. 2] (Live)	Released: November 23, 2018; Label: Warner Bros.; Format: DI, LP
EP 21	Released: 16. April 2021; Label: Warner Bros.; Format: DI
Summer Anthem	Released: 22. August 2025; Label: Warner Bros.; Format: DI

=== Singles ===
Title	Year	Peak chart positions										Certifications	Album
Title	Year	US	US Pop	US Rock	AUS	AUT	CAN	ICE	IRL	NZ	UK	Certifications	Album
"Do You Believe?"/"My Girl"	1989	—	—	— (Note: "Do You Believe?" did not enter the Hot Rock & Alternative Songs chart.)	—	—	—	—	—	—	—		Non-album single
"We Are the Normal"	1993	—	—	— (Note: "We Are the Normal" did not enter the Hot Rock & Alternative Songs chart, but peaked at number five on the Alternative Airplay chart.)	—	—	—	—	—	—	—		"Superstar Car Wash"
"Only One"	1995	—	—	— (Note: "Only One" did not enter the Hot Rock & Alternative Songs chart, but peaked at number 21 on the Mainstream Rock chart.)	—	—	—	—	—	—	—		A Boy Named Goo
"Name"	1995	5	2	— (Note: "Name" did not enter the Hot Rock & Alternative Songs chart, but peaked at number one on the Mainstream Rock chart.)	64	—	2	35	—	43	—	RIAA: 2× Platinum; MC: Platinum; RMNZ: Platinum	A Boy Named Goo
"Naked"	1996	— (Note: "Naked" did not enter the Billboard Hot 100, but peaked at number 47 on the US Radio Songs chart.)	—	— (Note: "Naked" did not enter the Hot Rock & Alternative Songs chart, but peaked at number one on the Mainstream Rock chart.)	—	—	42	—	—	—	—		A Boy Named Goo
"Long Way Down"	1996	—	—	— (Note: "Long Way Down" did not enter the Hot Rock & Alternative Songs chart, but peaked at number seven on the Mainstream Rock chart.)	—	—	—	—	—	—	—		A Boy Named Goo
"Lazy Eye"	1997	—	—	— (Note: "Lazy Eye" did not enter the Hot Rock & Alternative Songs chart, but peaked at number nine on the Mainstream Rock chart.)	—	—	71	—	—	—	—		Batman & Robin: Music from and Inspired by the "Batman & Robin" Motion Picture
"Iris"	1998	9 (Note: "Iris" and "Slide" did not originally enter the Billboard Hot 100, but both peaked at number one on the Radio Songs chart. The two songs later charted on the Billboard Hot 100 after the rules changed in December 1998, with "Iris" peaking at number 9 and "Slide" at number 8.)	1	14	1	63	1	5	5	2	3 (Note: "Iris" originally peaked at number 50 in the UK in 1998, and number 26 in 1999. It reached number 3 after re-entering the chart in 2011 due to performances on The X Factor.)	RIAA: Diamond; ARIA: 2× Platinum; BPI: 7× Platinum; MC: Diamond; RMNZ: 10× Platinum	Dizzy Up the Girl
"Slide"	1998	8	1	— (Note: "Slide" did not enter the Hot Rock & Alternative Songs chart, but peaked at number one on the Alternative Airplay chart.)	29	—	1	14	—	8	43	RIAA: 3× Platinum; ARIA: Gold; BPI: Silver; MC: 3× Platinum; RMNZ: Platinum	Dizzy Up the Girl
"Dizzy"	1999	— (Note: "Dizzy" did not enter the Billboard Hot 100, but peaked at number eight on the Bubbling Under Hot 100 chart.)	—	— (Note: "Dizzy" did not enter the Hot Rock & Alternative Songs chart, but peaked at number nine on the Alternative Airplay chart.)	50	—	28	—	—	—	16		Dizzy Up the Girl
"Black Balloon"	1999	16	13	— (Note: "Black Balloon" did not enter the Hot Rock & Alternative Songs chart, but peaked at number 13 on the Alternative Airplay chart.)	—	—	3	23	—	—	76	RIAA: Platinum	Dizzy Up the Girl
"Broadway"	2000	24	15	— (Note: "Broadway" did not enter the Hot Rock & Alternative Songs chart, but peaked at number 10 on the Adult Alternative Airplay chart.)	66	—	7	6	—	—	—		Dizzy Up the Girl
"Here Is Gone"	2002	18	15	— (Note: "Here Is Gone" did not enter the Hot Rock & Alternative Songs chart, but peaked at number 21 on the Alternative Airplay chart.)	40	—	—	—	—	17	100	RIAA: Gold	Gutterflower
"Big Machine"	2002	64	31	— (Note: "Big Machine" did not enter the Hot Rock & Alternative Songs chart, but peaked at number 39 on the Heritage Rock chart.)	77	—	—	—	—	—	—		Gutterflower
"Give a Little Bit"	2004	37	30	—	—	45	—	—	—	—	—	RIAA: Gold	Let Love In
"Better Days"	2005	36	34	— (Note: "Better Days" did not enter the Hot Rock & Alternative Songs chart, but peaked at number eight on the Adult Alternative Airplay chart.)	—	—	5	—	—	—	81	RIAA: Platinum	Let Love In
"Stay with You" / "Iris"	2006	51	49	— (Note: "Stay with You" did not enter the Hot Rock & Alternative Songs chart, but peaked at number 12 on the Adult Alternative Airplay chart.)	97	—	— (Note: "Stay With You" did not enter the Canadian Hot 100, but peaked at number 21 on the Canada All-Format Airplay chart.)	—	—	—	39	RIAA: Gold	Let Love In
"Before It's Too Late (Sam and Mikaela's Theme)"	2007	86	75	—	—	—	—	—	—	—	176 (Note: The Official UK Chart for "Before It's Too Late (Sam and Mikaela's Theme)" list it under the title "Fiction" or "Fiction (Before It's Too Late)", after the song's original title.)		Transformers: The Album and Greatest Hits Volume One: The Singles
"Real"	2008	92	— (Note: "Real" did not enter the Pop Airplay chart, but peaked at number 39 on the Adult Pop Airplay chart.)	—	—	—	—	—	—	—	—		AT&T Team USA soundtrack
"Home"	2010	— (Note: "Home" did not enter the Billboard Hot 100, but peaked at number 10 on the Bubbling Under Hot 100 chart.)	— (Note: "Home" did not enter the Pop Airplay chart, but peaked at number nine on the Adult Pop Airplay chart.)	— (Note: "Home" did not enter the Hot Rock & Alternative Songs chart, but peaked at number 15 on the Rock Digital Song Sales chart.)	—	—	—	—	—	—	—		Something for the Rest of Us
"Notbroken"	2010	— (Note: "Notbroken" did not enter the Billboard Hot 100, but peaked at number 19 on the Bubbling Under Hot 100 chart.)	— (Note: "Notbroken" did not enter the Pop Airplay chart, but peaked at number 26 on the Adult Pop Airplay chart.)	— (Note: "Notbroken" did not enter the Hot Rock & Alternative Songs chart, but peaked at number 11 on the Rock Digital Song Sales chart.)	—	—	—	—	—	—	—		Something for the Rest of Us
"All That You Are"	2011	— (Note: "All That You Are" did not enter the Billboard Hot 100, but peaked at number 17 on the Bubbling Under Hot 100 chart.)	— (Note: "All That You Are" did not enter the Pop Airplay chart, but peaked at number 16 on the Adult Pop Airplay chart.)	—	—	—	—	—	—	—	—		Transformers: Dark of the Moon – The Album
"Rebel Beat"	2013	— (Note: "Rebel Beat" did not enter the Billboard Hot 100, but peaked at number 100 on the US Radio Songs chart.)	— (Note: "Rebel Beat" did not enter the Pop Airplay chart, but peaked at number 16 on the Adult Pop Airplay chart.)	20	94	—	—	—	—	—	—		Magnetic
"Come to Me"	2013	— (Note: "Come to Me" did not enter the Billboard Hot 100, but peaked at number 15 on the Bubbling Under Hot 100 chart.)	— (Note: "Come to Me" did not enter the Pop Airplay chart, but peaked at number 16 on the Adult Pop Airplay chart.)	17	—	—	—	—	—	—	—	RIAA: Gold	Magnetic
"So Alive"	2016	—	— (Note: "So Alive" did not enter the Pop Airplay chart, but peaked at number 13 on the Adult Pop Airplay chart.)	21	—	—	—	—	—	—	—		Boxes
"Over and Over"	2016	—	— (Note: "Over and Over" did not enter the Pop Airplay chart, but peaked at number 37 on the Adult Pop Airplay chart.)	—	—	—	—	—	—	—	—		Boxes
"Use Me"	2017	—	— (Note: "Use Me" did not enter the Pop Airplay chart, but peaked at number 29 on the Adult Pop Airplay chart.)	—	—	—	—	—	—	—	—		You Should Be Happy
"Miracle Pill"	2019	—	— (Note: "Miracle Pill" did not enter the Pop Airplay chart, but peaked at number 18 on the Adult Pop Airplay chart.)	30	—	—	—	—	—	—	—		Miracle Pill
"Money, Fame and Fortune"	2019	—	—	—	—	—	—	—	—	—	—		Miracle Pill
"Indestructible"	2019	—	—	—	—	—	—	—	—	—	—		Miracle Pill
"Fearless"	2020	—	— (Note: "Fearless" did not enter the Pop Airplay chart, but peaked at number 24 on the Adult Pop Airplay chart.)	—	—	—	—	—	—	—	—		Miracle Pill
"Autumn Leaves"	2020	—	—	—	—	—	—	—	—	—	—		Miracle Pill
"Let It Snow"	2020	—	— (Note: "Let It Snow" did not enter the Pop Airplay chart, but peaked at number 29 on the Adult Contemporary chart.)	—	—	—	—	—	—	—	—		It's Christmas All Over
"This Is Christmas"	2020	—	— (Note: "This Is Christmas" did not enter the Pop Airplay chart, but peaked at number eight on the Adult Contemporary chart.)	— (Note: "This Is Christmas" did not enter the Hot Rock & Alternative Songs chart, but peaked at number 15 on the Rock Digital Song Sales chart.)	—	—	—	—	—	—	—		It's Christmas All Over
“One Last Song About Christmas”	2020	—	— (Note: "One Last Song About Christmas" did not enter the Pop Airplay chart, but peaked at number 28 on the Adult Contemporary chart.)	—	—	—	—	—	—	—	—		It's Christmas All Over
"Don't Change" (live)	2021	—	—	—	—	—	—	—	—	—	—		Rarities
"Let Love In" (live)	2021	—	—	—	—	—	—	—	—	—	—		Rarities
"Nothing Can Change You"	2021	—	—	—	—	—	—	—	—	—	—		Rarities
"Yeah, I Like You"	2022	—	—	—	—	—	—	—	—	—	—		Chaos in Bloom
"You Are the Answer"	2022	—	— (Note: "You Are the Answer" did not enter the Pop Airplay chart, but peaked at number 16 on the Adult Contemporary chart.)	—	—	—	—	—	—	—	—		Chaos in Bloom
"I Won't Back Down" (with O.A.R.)	2023	—	—	—	—	—	—	—	—	—	—		Non-album single
"Run All Night"	2023	—	— (Note: "Run All Night" did not enter the Pop Airplay chart, but peaked at number 36 on the Adult Pop Airplay chart.)	—	—	—	—	—	—	—	—		Summer Anthem
"Beautiful Lie"	2024	—	—	—	—	—	—	—	—	—	—		Non-album single
"Nothing Lasts Forever"	2025	—	—	—	—	—	—	—	—	—	—		Summer Anthem
"Not Goodbye (Close My Eyes)"	2025	—	—	—	—	—	—	—	—	—	—		Summer Anthem
"Misery"	2026	—	— (Note: "Misery" did not enter the Pop Airplay chart, but peaked at number 27 on the Adult Pop Airplay chart.)	—	—	—	—	—	—	—	—		Summer Anthem
"Ocean"	2026	—	— (Note: "Ocean" did not enter the Pop Airplay chart, but peaked at number 26 on the Adult Pop Airplay chart.)	—	—	—	—	—	—	—	—		Summer Anthem
"—" denotes that the recording did not chart or was not released in that territory.

=== Promotional singles ===
Title	Year	Peak chart positions								Certifications	Album
Title	Year	US	US AC	US Adult	US Alt.	US Main.	US Pop	CAN Air	CAN AC	Certifications	Album
"There You Are"	1990	—	—	—	24	—	—	—	—		Hold Me Up
"I'm Awake Now"	1991	—	—	—	—	—	—	—	—		Freddy's Dead
"Flat Top"	1995	—	—	—	—	38	—	—	—		A Boy Named Goo
"Sympathy"	2003	— (Note: "Sympathy" did not enter the Billboard Hot 100, but peaked at number 15 on the Bubbling Under Hot 100 chart.)	—	10	—	—	—	—	—	RIAA: Gold	Gutterflower
"Let Love In"	2006	— (Note: "Let Love In" did not enter the Billboard Hot 100, but peaked at number one on the Bubbling Under Hot 100 chart.)	28	9	—	—	75	15	43		Let Love In
"Caught in the Storm"	2014	—	—	—	—	—	—	—	—		Magnetic
"Boxes (Alex Aldi Mix)"	2017	—	—	—	—	—	—	—	—		You Should Be Happy
"—" denotes that the recording did not chart or was not released in that territory.

=== Other charted songs ===
Title	Year	Peak chart positions		Album
Title	Year	US DL	US Rock DL	Album
"Iris (Live)"	2005	73	—	Live in Buffalo: July 4th, 2004
"Name (Live)"	2005	—	34	Live in Buffalo: July 4th, 2004
"Still Your Song"	2010	—	45	Something for the Rest of Us
"—" denotes that the recording did not chart or was not released in that territory.

=== Soundtrack contributions ===
Title	Year	Album
"I'm Awake Now"	1991	Freddy's Dead: The Final Nightmare
"You Know What I Mean"	1991	Freddy's Dead: The Final Nightmare
"Two Days in February"	1991	Freddy's Dead: The Final Nightmare
"Fallin' Down"	1993	Son in Law
"Wait for the Blackout"	1995	Tommy Boy
"Ain't That Unusual"	1995	Angus
"Don't Change"	1996	Ace Ventura: When Nature Calls
"Long Way Down"	1996	Twister
"Lazy Eye"	1997	Batman & Robin
"Iris"	1998	City of Angels
"Black Balloon"	2000	Down to You
"Black Balloon"	2000	Here on Earth
"I'm Still Here"	2002	Treasure Planet
"Here Is Gone"	2003	How to Deal
"Slide (Pride)"	2003	Sesame Street: Songs From The Street - 35 Years Of Music
"Sympathy"	2004	A Cinderella Story
"Give a Little Bit"	2005	Smallville
"Before It's Too Late (Sam and Mikaela's Theme)"	2007	Transformers: The Album
"Real"	2008	AT&T Team USA Soundtrack
"Better Days"	2009	Love Happens
"All That You Are"	2011	Transformers: Dark of the Moon – The Album
"Best of Me"	2011	Hawaii Five-0: Original Songs from the Television Series
"Slide"	2012	Bachelorette
"If the World Turned Upside Down"	2015	Finding Neverland

=== unofficial discography ===
- "I’ll Be There For You (1995)
- "Plowed" - Howard Stern Show (2019)

== Videography ==
=== DVDs and videos ===
Title	Album details	Peak chart positions	Certifications
Title	Album details	US Billboard	Certifications
Music in High Places: Live in Alaska	Released: 2003; Label: Image (3310); Format: DVD, VHS	—	
Live in Buffalo: July 4th, 2004	Released: November 23, 2004; Label: Warner Bros.; Format: CD (+DVD)	161	RIAA: Platinum
Live and Intimate	Released: November 13, 2007; Label: Warner Bros.; Format: DVD	—	

=== Music videos ===
Year	Song	Director	Album
1990	"There You Are"	John Lloyd Miller	Hold Me Up
1991	"I'm Awake Now"	—N/a	Freddy's Dead: The Final Nightmare (Music from the Motion Picture)
1993	"We Are the Normal"	Claudia Castle	Superstar Carwash
1993	"Bitch" (featuring Lance Diamond)	Beth McCarthy	—N/a
1995	"Only One"	Martin Atkins	A Boy Named Goo
1995	"Flat Top"	Geoff Moore	A Boy Named Goo
1995	"Name" (version 1)	Geoff Moore	A Boy Named Goo
1995	"Name" (version 2)	Martyn Atkins	A Boy Named Goo
1996	"Naked"	David Hogan	A Boy Named Goo
1996	"Long Way Down" (Version 1)	David Hogan	A Boy Named Goo
1996	"Long Way Down" (Version 2)	David Hogan	A Boy Named Goo
1997	"Lazy Eye"	Lawrence Carroll	—N/a
1998	"Iris" (Version 1)	Nancy Bardawil	City of Angels: Music from the Motion Picture
1998	"Iris" (Version 2)	Nancy Bardawil	Dizzy Up the Girl
1998	"Slide"	Nancy Bardawil	Dizzy Up the Girl
1999	"Dizzy"	Nancy Bardawil	Dizzy Up the Girl
1999	"Black Balloon"	Nancy Bardawil	Dizzy Up the Girl
2000	"Broadway"	Nancy Bardawil	Dizzy Up the Girl
2002	"Here Is Gone"	Francis Lawrence	Gutterflower
2002	"Big Machine"	—N/a	Gutterflower
2002	"Sympathy"	Anthony M. Bongiovi	Gutterflower
2004	"Give a Little Bit"	Anthony M. Bongiovi	Let Love In
2005	"Better Days"	Noble Jones	Let Love In
2006	"Stay with You"	P.R. Brown	Let Love In
2006	"Let Love In"	P.R. Brown	Let Love In
2007	"Before It's Too Late (Sam and Mikaela's Theme)"	Paul Boyd	Greatest Hits Volume One: The Singles
2008	"Real" (Two versions)	Shawn Robbins	AT&T Team USA Soundtrack
2010	"Home" (Version 1)	Devin Sarno	Something for the Rest of Us
2010	"Home" (Version 2)	—N/a	Something for the Rest of Us
2011	"Notbroken"	Carlos López Estrada	Something for the Rest of Us
2013	"Rebel Beat"	P.R. Brown	Magnetic
2013	"Come to Me"	Gus Black	Magnetic
2016	"So Alive"	Todd Bellanca	Boxes
2016	"Over and Over"	Eliezer Castillo	Boxes
2019	"Miracle Pill"	Ed Gregory and Dan Cooper	Miracle Pill
2020	"Lost"	Joelle Grace Taylor	Miracle Pill
2020	"Autumn Leaves"	Matt Mahurin	Miracle Pill
2020	"This is Christmas"	Raúl Gonzo	It's Christmas All Over
2022	"Yeah, I Like You"	—N/a	Chaos in Bloom
2022	"You are the Answer"	Keenan O’Reilly	Chaos in Bloom
2023	"I Won't Back Down" (featuring O.A.R.)	—N/a	—N/a
2023	"Run All Night"	Dedo Cieg (Joaquin Urbina and Ana Gale)	—N/a
2024	"Beautiful Lie"	—N/a	—N/a
