= Greatest Hits Volume One: The Singles =

Greatest hits album by The Goo Goo Dolls
- Released: November 13, 2007
- Recorded: 1994–2007
- Genre: Alternative rock
- Length: 52:47
- Label: Warner Bros.

The Goo Goo Dolls chronology
| Let Love In (2006) | Greatest Hits Volume One: The Singles (2007) | Vol.2 (2008) |

Professional ratings
Review scores
| Source | Rating |
|---|---|
| AllMusic | 4/5 stars |
| Alternative Addiction | 4/5 stars |
| PopMatters | 6/10 stars |
| Rocklouder! | 4/5 stars |
| Sputnikmusic | 3.0/5 |
| TuneLab Music | 8/10 stars |

Greatest Hits Volume One: The Singles is a greatest hits album by American rock band Goo Goo Dolls. It contains every hit single from Dizzy up the Girl to Let Love In, a newly recorded track, "Before It's Too Late", from the Transformers motion picture and a newly recorded version of their first hit single, "Name". The album was released on November 13, 2007.

The follow-up compilation, Vol.2, was released on August 19, 2008, consisting of rarities, B-sides, covers and a DVD of music videos and live performances.

Volume One debuted at number 33 on the U.S. Billboard 200 chart, selling about 33,000 copies in its first week.

== Track listing ==
| No. | Title | Length |
|---|---|---|
| 1. | "Let Love In" (from Let Love In, 2006) | 5:00 |
| 2. | "Dizzy" (from Dizzy Up the Girl, 1998) | 2:41 |
| 3. | "Here Is Gone" (from Gutterflower, 2002) | 3:58 |
| 4. | "Slide" (from Dizzy Up the Girl, 1998) | 3:33 |
| 5. | "Name" (New Version, originally from A Boy Named Goo, 1995) | 4:15 |
| 6. | "Stay with You" (from Let Love In, 2006) | 3:56 |
| 7. | "Before It's Too Late" (from Transformers: The Album, 2007) | 3:07 |
| 8. | "Broadway" (from Dizzy Up the Girl, 1998) | 3:58 |
| 9. | "Feel the Silence" (Remix, original from Let Love In, 2006) | 3:56 |
| 10. | "Better Days" (from Let Love In, 2006) | 3:33 |
| 11. | "Big Machine" (from Gutterflower, 2002) | 3:10 |
| 12. | "Black Balloon" (from Dizzy Up the Girl, 1998) | 4:10 |
| 13. | "Sympathy" (from Gutterflower, 2002) | 2:58 |
| 14. | "Iris" (from Dizzy Up the Girl, 1998) | 4:49 |
| Total length: | | 52:47 |

== Charts ==
=== Weekly charts ===
| Chart (2007–2011) | Peak position |
|---|---|
| Scottish Albums (Official Charts) | 75 |
| UK Albums (Official Charts) | 61 |
| US Billboard 200 | 33 |
| US Top Rock Albums (Billboard) | 7 |

| Chart (2024–2026) | Peak position |
|---|---|
| Canadian Albums (Billboard) | 46 |
| Hungarian Physical Albums (MAHASZ) | 22 |

=== Year-end charts ===
| Chart (2008) | Position |
|---|---|
| US Billboard 200 | 173 |

== Certifications ==
| Region | Certification | Certified units/sales |
|---|---|---|
| United Kingdom (BPI) | Gold | 100,000^{‡} |
^{‡} Sales+streaming figures based on certification alone.
