= Music in High Places: Live in Alaska =

- Starring: Goo Goo Dolls
- Distributed by: Earth Escapes L.L.C.
- Release date: March 18, 2003 (DVD)
- Country: United States
- Language: English

Music in High Places: Live in Alaska is a live DVD by the Goo Goo Dolls. It features live acoustic performances of some of the band's biggest hits.

== Track listing ==
No.	Title	Writer(s)	Length
1.	"Black Balloon" (Acoustic)	John Rzeznik
2.	"Acoustic #3" (Acoustic)	John Rzeznik
3.	"Broadway" (Acoustic)	John Rzeznik
4.	"Here Is Gone" (Acoustic)	John Rzeznik
5.	"Big Machine" (Acoustic)	John Rzeznik
6.	"What a Scene" (Acoustic)	John Rzeznik
7.	"Slide" (Acoustic)	John Rzeznik
8.	"Sympathy" (Acoustic)	John Rzeznik
9.	"You Never Know" (Acoustic)	Robby Takac

== Reception ==
DVD Talk said the film "offers a mixed bag. It works very well as an introduction to the scenic majesty of our northern-most state, but it fails to satisfy as a musical outing. Still, fans of the band will want to see the group playing in a totally new environment."
