= Rob Cavallo production discography =

Rob Cavallo is an Oscar, Golden Globe and multiple Grammy winning music producer. This is a list compiling his production discography.

== Partial production discography ==
=== Goo Goo Dolls ===
- 2013 – Magnetic ("Last Hot Night")
- 2006 – Let Love In ("Give a Little Bit")
- 2004 – Live in Buffalo: July 4th, 2004 ("Give a Little Bit")
- 2002 – Gutterflower
- 2001 – Ego, Opinion, Art & Commerce
- 1998 – Dizzy Up the Girl
- 1998 – "Iris" from the City of Angels soundtrack
- 1995 – "Wait for the Blackout" from Tommy Boy soundtrack
- 1995 – A Boy Named Goo ("Disconnected", "Slave Girl")

=== Green Day ===
- 2024 - Saviors
- 2012 – ¡Tré!
- 2012 – ¡Dos!
- 2012 – ¡Uno!
- 2005 – Bullet in a Bible
- 2004 – American Idiot
- 2002 – Shenanigans
- 2001 – International Superhits!
- 2000 – Warning (Executive producer)
- 1998 – "Brain Stew" from Godzilla: The Album
- 1997 – Nimrod
- 1997 – "Tired of Waiting" from Private Parts: The Album
- 1995 – Insomniac
- 1995 – "J.A.R." from the Angus soundtrack
- 1994 – Dookie (producer)

=== My Chemical Romance ===
- 2010 – Danger Days: The True Lives of the Fabulous Killjoys
- 2006 – The Black Parade

=== Avril Lavigne ===
- 2007 – The Best Damn Thing

=== Paramore ===
- 2011 – "Monster" from Transformers: Dark of the Moon – The Album and Singles Club
- 2009 – Brand New Eyes
- 2008 – "Decode" from Twilight: Original Motion Picture Soundtrack

=== Linkin Park ===
- 2014 – The Hunting Party (as A&R representative on the album and co-producer on "Wastelands")
- 2014 – A Light That Never Comes (Remixes) (as A&R representative)
- 2013 – Recharged (as A&R representative)
- 2012 – Living Things (as A&R representative)

=== Film soundtracks ===
- 2014 – Mall
- 2011 – Transformers: Dark of the Moon – The Album
- 2009 – 2012
- 2009 – I Love You, Beth Cooper
- 2008 – Twilight
- 2005 – Rent
- 2003 – Brother Bear
- 2002 – Treasure Planet
- 2001 – The Princess Diaries
- 2001 – Driven
- 2001 – The Wedding Planner
- 1999 – Varsity Blues
- 1999 – Runaway Bride
- 1999 – Detroit Rock City
- 1999 – Tarzan
- 1999 – The Other Sister
- 1998 – City of Angels
- 1998 – Godzilla
- 1997 – Private Parts
- 1995 – Angus
- 1995 – Clueless
- 1995 – National Lampoon's Senior Trip
- 1995 – Tommy Boy
- 1984 – Purple Rain

=== Other projects ===
- 2025 - "Detox" - One Ok Rock
- 2022 – "Luxury Disease" – One Ok Rock
- 2017 – "Come Over When You're Sober Pt 1" – Lil Peep
- 2013 – "If I Loved You" – Delta Rae
- 2013 – All That Echoes – Josh Groban
- 2013 – Heartthrob – Tegan and Sara
- 2012 – Blak and Blu – Gary Clark, Jr.
- 2012 – Control – The Indecent
- 2012 – Matt Toka – Matt Toka
- 2012 – Into the Wild: EP – LP
- 2012 – Amaryllis – Shinedown
- 2012 – The Bright Lights: EP – Gary Clark Jr.
- 2011 – 2011 Grammy Nominees
- 2011 – American Idol: 10th Anniversary: The Hits, Vol. 1
- 2011 – The Essential Ballads
- 2011 – People and Things – Jack's Mannequin
- 2010 – Some Kind of Trouble – James Blunt
- 2010 – Hang Cool Teddy Bear – Meatloaf
- 2010 – Foxy Shazam – Foxy Shazam
- 2010 – 2010 Grammy Nominees
- 2010 – Country Heat 2011
- 2010 – Happy Hour: The South River Road Sessions – Uncle Kracker
- 2010 – Top Ten – Sixpence None the Richer
- 2009 – For Your Entertainment – Adam Lambert
- 2009 – "Time for Miracles" – Adam Lambert
- 2009 – "Mess of Me" – Switchfoot
- 2009 – Happy Hour – Uncle Kracker
- 2009 – "Lovesick" – 78 Violet (feat. ALY & AJ)
- 2009 – "Violet Columbus" – Forget Me
- 2009 – Big Whiskey & the GrooGrux King – Dave Matthews Band
- 2009 – "Second Chance" – Shinedown
- 2009 – Twilight Ultimate Gift Set
- 2008 – "All Summer Long" – Kid Rock
- 2008 – "Coming to Terms" – Carolina Liar
- 2008 – Disney Greatest Love Songs
- 2008 – Now That's What I Call Music!, Vol. 71
- 2008 – Revolutions in Sound: Warner Bros. Records – The First 50 Years
- 2008 – Shattered (Turn the Car Around) – O.A.R.
- 2008 – David Cook – David Cook
- 2008 – Gift of Screws – Lindsey Buckingham
- 2008 – Greatest Hits – Dave Koz
- 2008 – All Sides – O.A.R.
- 2008 – The Sound of Madness – Shinedown
- 2007 – Rock N Roll Jesus – Kid Rock
- 2007 – Happiness Ltd. – Hot Hot Heat
- 2007 – "I'm Still Here (Jim's Theme) – John Rzeznik
- 2007 – CBGB Forever
- 2007 – Give US Your Poor
- 2007 – Let Me In, Pt. 1 – Hot Hot Heat
- 2007 – Thrivemix, Vol. 3: Mixed by DJ Skribble and Vic Latino
- 2006 – "Again and Again" – Jewel
- 2006 – Festival 06
- 2006 – Grammy Nominees 2006
- 2006 – Rent: Seasons of Love
- 2006 – Rent: Take Me or Leave Me
- 2006 – Thrivemix, Vol. 2: Mixed by Vic Latino
- 2006 – Under the Skin – Lindsey Buckingham
- 2006 – Paris – Paris Hilton
- 2006 – Goodbye Alice in Wonderland – Jewel
- 2005 – The Collection – Alanis Morissette
- 2005 – I'm Not Your Girl – Lalaine
- 2005 – Room Noises – Eisley
- 2005 – Disney Wishes!
- 2005 – Golden Slumbers: A Father's Love
- 2005 – Grammy Nominees 2005
- 2005 – Hear Music XM Radio Sessions, Vol. 1
- 2005 – Whatever: The 90's Pop and Culture Box
- 2004 – Love Songs: A Compilation... Old and New – Phil Collins
- 2004 – Oh! From the Girls
- 2004 – The Best of Sixpence None the Richer
- 2004 – Walt Disney Records Presents Superstar Hits
- 2004 – Trouble – Bonnie McKee
- 2004 – B is for B-Sides – Less Than Jake
- 2003 – Just So You Know/Mannequins – Holly Palmer
- 2003 – "Look Through My Eyes" from Brother Bear: Original Motion Picture Soundtrack – Phil Collins
- 2003 – Perfect Change – Dakona
- 2003 – Are You Happy Now? – Michelle Branch
- 2003 – Anthem – Less Than Jake
- 2003 – Say You Will – Fleetwood Mac
- 2003 – My Degeneration – Flashlight Brown
- 2003 – To Whom It May Concern – Lisa Marie Presley
- 2003 – Edge of a Girl – Alexandra Slate
- 2003 – Don't Dream It's Over/Kiss Me – Sixpence None the Richer
- 2003 – Smallville: The Talon Mix
- 2002 – Disney' Superstar Hits
- 2002 – Etc. – Jawbreaker
- 2002 – Lost Angel – 3rd Strike
- 2002 – Simply the Best Movie Album
- 2002 – Totally Hits 2002: More Platinum Hits
- 2002 – Divine Discontent – Sixpence None the Richer
- 2002 – Testify – Phil Collins
- 2002 – Into Your Head – BBMak
- 2002 – "I'm Gonna Love You (Madeline's Theme)" from The Hunchback of Notre Dame II – Jennifer Love Hewitt
- 2001 – Weird Revolution – Butthole Surfers
- 2001 – "Miss You More" from Princess Diaries: Official Soundtrack – BBMak
- 2001 – BlowBack – Tricky
- 2001 – Leroy – Leroy
- 2001 – MTV 20: Pop
- 2001 – The Box Set – Kiss
- 2001 – Unplugged/Clapton Chronicles: The Best of Eric Clapton – Eric Clapton
- 2000 – Sooner or Later – BBMak
- 2000 – Best of L7: The Slash Years – L7
- 2000 – Disney's Greatest Hits
- 2000 – Hamburger – The Muffs
- 2000 – Key of a Minor – Jessica Riddle
- 2000 – Take 2 – Green Day
- 2000 – Tsar – Tsar
- 1999 – "Blue Eyes Blue" from Clapton Chronicles: The Best of Eric Clapton – Eric Clapton and the Runaway Bride official soundtrack
- 1999 – "Nothing Can Keep Me From You" from Detroit Rock City: Official Soundtrack – Kiss
- 1999 – Tarzan: Official Soundtrack – Phil Collins
- 1999 – Jump Start – Simon Says
- 1999 – "Loving You Is All I Know" from The Other Sister official soundtrack – The Pretenders
- 1999 – 1999 Grammy Nominees: Mainstream (Producer)
- 1998 – Speak of the Devil – Chris Isaak
- 1997 – The Fourth World – Kara's Flowers (later renamed Maroon 5)
- 1997 – The Beauty Process: Triple Platinum – L7
- 1997 – Generations, Vol. 1: A Punk Look at Human Rights
- 1997 – More Bounce to the Ounce
- 1997 – Soap Disco – Kara's Flowers (later renamed Maroon 5)
- 1996 – Buy-Product 2: Brief Encounters
- 1996 – Jabberjaw Compilation, Vol 2.: Pure Sweet Hell
- 1995 – Dear You – Jawbreaker
- 1995 – "You Gave Your Love To Me Softly" from the Angus soundtrack – Weezer
- 1995 – "Enough" from the Angus soundtrack – Dance Hall Crashers
- 1995 – Blonder and Blonder – The Muffs
- 1995 – Lockjaw – Dance Hall Crashers
- 1992 – American Man – Power Trio from Hell
- 1985 – Prince & the Revolution: Live
