= Live in Buffalo: July 4th, 2004 =

Live album by the Goo Goo Dolls
- Released: November 23, 2004
- Recorded: July 4, 2004
- Venue: Buffalo City Hall
- Genre: Alternative rock
- Length: 68:20
- Label: Warner Bros.
- Producer: Goo Goo Dolls; Rob Cavallo

The Goo Goo Dolls chronology
Gutterflower (2002)	Live in Buffalo: July 4th, 2004 (2004)	Let Love In (2006)

Singles from Live in Buffalo: July 4th, 2004
- 1. "Give a Little Bit" Released: October 5, 2004

Professional ratings
Review scores
Source	Rating
Allmusic	3/5 stars

Live in Buffalo: July 4th, 2004 is a live album by the American rock band the Goo Goo Dolls. It includes a CD and a DVD, showing their concert in Buffalo, New York from July 4, 2004. The concert included performances of all their major hits, including "Iris", "Name", and "Slide". There are nineteen (19) songs on the DVD total, plus a studio version of their Supertramp cover, "Give A Little Bit" on the CD. The concert was shot and recorded in downtown Buffalo on Niagara Square in front of Buffalo City Hall. As for the concert itself, the performance was enigmatic, garnering comparisons to Talking Heads' Stop Making Sense from members of the band's crew. Over 60,000 fans attended the performance, braving a torrential downpour. The rain cleared in time for the Goo Goo Dolls to start the show, but during their performance of "January Friend", the rain began pouring down again, harder than before. The band played on, finishing the set, despite being pulled off stage briefly for a safety precaution and skipping three songs that were on the original set list.

The music video for "Give a Little Bit", which consists of footage from the concert and documentary, was edited by Scott C. Wilson.

== Track listing ==
All songs written by John Rzeznik except when noted.

No.	Title	Writer(s)	Length
1.	"Give a Little Bit" (Supertramp cover; Studio recording)	Rick Davies, Roger Hodgson	3:33
2.	"Big Machine"		3:29
3.	"Naked"		3:39
4.	"Slide"		3:58
5.	"Think About Me"		3:42
6.	"Smash"	Robby Takac	2:04
7.	"Tucked Away"	Takac	3:10
8.	"Black Balloon"		4:12
9.	"Dizzy"		2:47
10.	"Name"		5:22
11.	"Cuz You're Gone/1000 Words"		6:28
12.	"Sympathy"		2:49
13.	"January Friend"	Takac	3:08
14.	"Here Is Gone"		3:29
15.	"What a Scene"		4:13
16.	"Acoustic #3"		2:31
17.	"Two Days in February"	Goo Goo Dolls	3:42
18.	"Broadway"		4:55
19.	"Iris"		6:16
20.	"Give a Little Bit"	Davies, Hodgson	4:02

== Personnel ==
Goo Goo Dolls

- Johnny Rzeznik – lead vocals, guitar, acoustic guitar
- Robby Takac – bass guitar, backing vocals, lead vocals on tracks 6, 7, 13
- Mike Malinin – drums, percussion

Additional personnel

- Greg Suran – guitar, mandolin, percussion, backing vocals
- Jason Freese – keyboards, accordion, saxophone, backing vocals

== Songs omitted due to rain delay ==
1. "We Are the Normal"
2. "Burnin' Up"
3. "All Eyes On Me"

== Charts ==
Chart (2004)	Peak position
US Billboard 200	161

== Certifications ==
Region	Certification	Certified units/sales
United States (RIAA)	Platinum	1,000,000^{^}
^{^} Shipments figures based on certification alone.
