= Let Love In =

Let Love In may refer to:

- Let Love In (Nick Cave and the Bad Seeds album) (1994)
- Let Love In (A Cursive Memory album) (2010)
- Let Love In (Goo Goo Dolls album) (2006)
  - "Let Love In" (song)
- Let Love In (Crystal Lewis album) (1990)
