= Vol.2 (Goo Goo Dolls album) =

Greatest hits album by The Goo Goo Dolls
- Released: August 25, 2008
- Recorded: 1987–2008
- Genre: Alternative rock
- Length: 78:57
- Label: Warner Bros.
- Producer: Glen Ballard

The Goo Goo Dolls chronology
Greatest Hits Volume One: The Singles (2007)	Vol.2 (2008)	Something for the Rest of Us (2010)

Professional ratings
Review scores
Source	Rating
Alternative Addiction	4/5 stars
Allmusic	3.5/5 stars

Vol.2 is a compilation album by American rock band Goo Goo Dolls, serving as the second volume to Greatest Hits Volume One: The Singles. It consists of two discs: one, a CD with previously unreleased tracks, b-sides, rarities, new covers, fan favorites and live performances; the other, a DVD with 23 music videos and videos from live performances.

== Track listing ==
=== Disc 1 (CD) ===
The Songs

1. "Hate This Place" – 4:24
2. "Stop the World" – 3:32
3. "Long Way Down" – 3:28
4. "All Eyes On Me" (Live at Red Rocks) – 4:37
5. "Lazy Eye" – 3:44
6. "Iris" (Demo) – 4:18
7. "I'm Awake Now" – 3:16
8. "Torn Apart" – 2:05
9. "No Way Out" – 2:39
10. "String of Lies" – 3:07
11. "We'll Be Here (When You're Gone)" (New Mix) – 5:55
12. "Without You Here" – 3:48
13. "Only One" – 3:18
14. "Truth Is A Whisper" – 4:00
15. "What A Scene" – 4:27
16. "Million Miles Away" (The Plimsouls) – 2:44
17. "I Wanna Destroy You" (The Soft Boys) – 2:34
18. "Wait for the Blackout" (The Damned) – 3:38
19. "Slave Girl" (Lime Spiders) – 2:22
20. "Don't Change" (INXS) – 3:39
21. "I Don't Want To Know" (Fleetwood Mac) – 3:37
22. "American Girl" (Live) (Tom Petty and the Heartbreakers) – 3:50

=== Disc 2 (DVD) ===
The Videos

1. "There You Are"
2. "We Are The Normal"
3. "Only One"
4. "Flat Top"
5. "Name"
6. "Naked"
7. "Long Way Down"
8. "Lazy Eye"
9. "Iris"
10. "Slide"
11. "Black Balloon"
12. "Dizzy"
13. "Broadway"
14. "Here Is Gone"
15. "Sympathy"
16. "Stay With You"
17. "Let Love In"

Live at Red Rocks

1. "Long Way Down"
2. "Slide"
3. "Feel the Silence"
4. "Before It's Too Late"
5. "Slave Girl"
6. "Better Days"

The Limited Edition on the Goo Goo Dolls website contains all of the music videos listed above and the entire Red Rocks concert listed below.

1. Long Way Down
2. Big Machine
3. Slide
4. Feel The Silence
5. Black Balloon
6. Lucky Star
7. January Friend
8. Cuz You're Gone
9. Become
10. All Eyes On Me
11. Name
12. Before It's Too Late
13. Slave Girl
14. Stay With You
15. Let Love In
16. Better Days
17. Iris
18. Naked
19. Broadway
