= Rolling Stone Original =

Rolling Stone Original may refer to:

- Rolling Stone Original (Papa Roach EP), 2004
- Rolling Stone Original (Big & Rich EP), 2005
- Rolling Stone Original (Goo Goo Dolls EP), 2006
