= Bang! (EP) =

EP by Goo Goo Dolls
- Released: September 19, 1997 (Japan only)
- Label: Warner Bros.

Goo Goo Dolls chronology
A Boy Named Goo (1995)	Bang! (1997)	Dizzy Up the Girl (1998)

Bang! is a mostly live EP released only in Japan by the Goo Goo Dolls in 1997 for Warner Bros. Records.

== Track listing ==
No.	Title	Length
1.	"Name" (Live)	3:53
2.	"Don't Change" (Live)	3:48
3.	"Girl Right Next to Me" (Live)	3:31
4.	"Another Second Time Around" (Live)	2:52
5.	"Long Way Down" (final version)	3:26

== Sources ==
- MusicBrainz page for Bang!
- Amazon.com page
