= Let Love In (Goo Goo Dolls album) =

Studio album by the Goo Goo Dolls
- Released: April 25, 2006
- Recorded: 2004 ("Give a Little Bit"); Mid–late 2005
- Genres: Alternative rock; pop rock
- Length: 42:02
- Label: Warner Bros.
- Producers: Glen Ballard; Rob Cavallo; Goo Goo Dolls

The Goo Goo Dolls chronology
| Live in Buffalo: July 4th, 2004 (2004) | Let Love In (2006) | Greatest Hits Volume One: The Singles (2007) |

Singles from Let Love In
- 1. "Better Days" Released: September 20, 2005; 2. "Stay with You" Released: April 4, 2006; 3. "Let Love In" Released: October 2, 2006

Professional ratings
Aggregate scores
| Source | Rating |
|---|---|
| Metacritic | 57/100 |
Review scores
| Source | Rating |
| AbsolutePunk.net | 85% |
| AllMusic | 3/5 stars |
| The Celebrity Cafe | 8/10 stars |
| Entertainment Weekly | C+ |
| Q Magazine | 3/5 stars |
| Rolling Stone | 3/5 stars |
| Sputnik Music | 4/5 stars |
| Ultimate Guitar | 4/5 stars |

Let Love In is the eighth studio album by American rock band the Goo Goo Dolls, released in 2006. The album peaked at number nine on the US Billboard 200, selling around 83,000 copies in its first week. The album was certified Gold for sales of 500,000 units in May 2019 by the Recording Industry Association of America.

== Track listing ==
All songs written by John Rzeznik except when noted.

| No. | Title | Writer(s) | Length |
|---|---|---|---|
| 1. | "Stay with You" | Rzeznik, Glen Ballard | 3:56 |
| 2. | "Let Love In" | Rzeznik, Ballard, Gregg Wattenberg | 5:00 |
| 3. | "Feel the Silence" | | 3:50 |
| 4. | "Better Days" | | 3:33 |
| 5. | "Without You Here" | | 3:49 |
| 6. | "Listen" | Robby Takac, Rzeznik | 3:11 |
| 7. | "Give a Little Bit" (Supertramp cover) | Rick Davies, Roger Hodgson | 3:35 |
| 8. | "Can't Let It Go" | | 3:53 |
| 9. | "We'll Be Here (When You're Gone)" | | 3:29 |
| 10. | "Strange Love" | Takac, Rzeznik | 3:35 |
| 11. | "Become" | Rzeznik, Ballard | 4:08 |

== Tour Edition DVD ==
Live and Intimate

1. "Stay with You"
2. "Let Love In"
3. "Feel the Silence"
4. "Better Days"
5. "Without You Here"
6. "Listen"
7. "Can't Let It Go"
8. "We'll Be Here (When You're Gone)
9. "Strange Love"
10. "Black Balloon"
11. "Iris"
12. "Become"
13. "Broadway"
14. "Here Is Gone"

Audio studio tracks

1. "We'll Be Here (When You're Gone) (Acoustic)
2. "Better Days" (Acoustic) (also included on Japan pressings)

== Personnel ==
Goo Goo Dolls

- John Rzeznik – guitar, vocals
- Robby Takac – bass guitar, vocals
- Mike Malinin – drums, percussion

Additional musicians

- Joel Shearer – guitars
- Zac Rae – keyboards
- Tim Pierce – guitars
- Greg Suran – guitars, additional guitars on "Give a Little Bit"
- Paul Gordon – keyboards
- Brian Kilgore – percussion
- Jason Freese – keyboards on "Give a Little Bit"

Production

- Glen Ballard – production (all except "Give a Little Bit")
- Rob Cavallo – production on "Give a Little Bit"
- Goo Goo Dolls – production on "Give a Little Bit"
- Bill Malina – recording
- Doug McKean – engineer on "Give a Little Bit"
- Kevin Mills – assistant engineer
- Scott Campbell – additional recording
- Rick Santizo – additional recording
- Jack Joseph Puig – mixing
- Dean Nelson – mix assistant
- Ted Jensen – mastering

== Charts ==
Chart performance
| Chart (2006) | Peak position |
|---|---|
| Canadian Albums (Nielsen SoundScan) | 15 |
| Irish Albums (IRMA) | 98 |
| Scottish Albums (Official Charts) | 51 |
| Swedish Albums (Sverigetopplistan) | 39 |
| UK Albums (Official Charts) | 58 |
| US Billboard 200 | 9 |
| US Indie Store Album Sales (Billboard) | 5 |
| US Top Rock Albums (Billboard) | 4 |

== Certifications ==
Certifications
| Region | Certification | Certified units/sales |
|---|---|---|
| United Kingdom (BPI) | Silver | 60,000^{*} |
| United States (RIAA) | Gold | 500,000^{‡} |
^{*} Sales figures based on certification alone.^{‡} Sales+streaming figures based on certification alone.
