= Dave Schulz (musician) =

American musician

- Birth name: Dave Schulz
- Born: Buffalo, New York
- Genres: Funk, New Wave, Rock, Classical, Pop
- Occupation(s): Keyboardist, Vocalist, Producer, Composer
- Instrument(s): Keyboards, vocals
- Years active: 1996–present
- Website: www.daveschulzmusic.com berlinpage.com

Dave Schulz is a funk, pop, and rock musician from Buffalo, New York. Schulz has released albums as a solo artist, as the headliner of the band C.O. Jones, and as a band member. Schulz is currently also the keyboardist for Berlin, Cherie Currie, Brie Darling, and Into The Frequency. Previous to that, Schulz was a core member of Lance Diamond's 24 Karat Diamond Band, and since the late 1990s has toured and performed internationally with bands including Goo Goo Dolls, Fastball, English Beat, Wang Chung, The Rembrandts, Fuel, General Public, and DEVO founder Gerald Casale's Jihad Jerry & the Evildoers among many others.

Schulz had a strong presence in the late 1990 Buffalo music scene, and was inducted in 2008 to the Buffalo Music Hall of Fame. After the year 2000, Schulz moved to Los Angeles, performing as a solo act, in organized "all star jams", and with Berlin and other bands.

Schulz also writes and produces for other artists, collaborating with the likes of Daniel Lanois, Robi Banerji, and Matt Gruber.

== Discography ==
- C.O. Jones, Who Knew? - 1999
- Berlin, Extended Versions - 2005
- Jihad Jerry & the Evildoers, Mine is Not a Holy War - 2006
- Bran Van 3000, Rose - 2007
- Dave Schulz, Connect - 2009
- Berlin, All the Way In (live) - 2009
- Berlin, Animal - 2013 (keyboard, vocals, arrangement)
- Tackhead, For the Love of Money - 2014

Discography reference

== Awards ==
- Nominee, Male Vocalist of the Year at the 2005 Los Angeles Music Awards
- Winner, 2006 All Access Awards: a win for Best Keyboardist of the Year
- Nominee, Song of the Year ("Planet 39") and Album of the Year (for his work with One Tribe Nation).
- Inductee, 2008 Buffalo Music Hall of Fame https://www.bmhof.org/Inductees-S/Schulz-Family.html
