= Stay with You (Goo Goo Dolls song) =

Single by Goo Goo Dolls

from the album Let Love In
- Released: April 4, 2006
- Genre: Alternative rock, post-grunge
- Length: 3:56
- Label: Warner Bros. Records
- Songwriters: Johnny Rzeznik, Glen Ballard
- Producer: Glen Ballard

Goo Goo Dolls singles chronology
"Better Days" (2005)	"Stay with You" (2006)	"Let Love In" (2006)

"Stay with You" is a song recorded by the Goo Goo Dolls. It was released in April 2006 as the second single from their eighth studio album, Let Love In. The song is the second single released from the album, following "Better Days". It was released as a double A-side with a re-release of the band's signature song "Iris", originally from Dizzy Up the Girl. The single was certified Gold by the RIAA in October 2009.

== Track listing ==
Initial pressing

1. "Stay with You" - 3:56
2. "Iris" - 4:51

Alternate pressing

1. "Stay with You" - 3:56
2. "Iris" - 4:51
3. "Let Love In" (Live)

Vinyl pressing

1. "Stay with You" - 3:56
2. "Iris" - 4:51

== Charts ==
=== Weekly charts ===
Chart (2006)	Peak position
Australia (ARIA)	97
Canada Hot AC (Billboard)	2
Scotland Singles (OCC)	29
UK Singles (OCC)	39
UK Rock & Metal (OCC)	3
US Billboard Hot 100	51
US Adult Contemporary (Billboard)	32
US Adult Pop Airplay (Billboard)	6
US Pop 100 (Billboard)	49

=== Year-end charts ===
Chart (2006)	position
US Adult Top 40 (Billboard)	18

== Certifications ==
Region	Certification	Certified units/sales
United States (RIAA)	Gold	500,000^{^}
^{^} Shipments figures based on certification alone.

== Release history ==
Release dates and formats for "Stay with You"
Region	Date	Format	Label(s)	Ref.
United States	May 22, 2006	Mainstream airplay	Warner Bros.	
