= Before It's Too Late (Sam and Mikaela's Theme) =

Single by The Goo Goo Dolls

from the album Transformers: The Album
- Released: June 5, 2007
- Genre: Pop rock; alternative rock
- Length: 3:02
- Label: Warner Bros.
- Songwriter: John Rzeznik
- Producers: Richard and The Twins

The Goo Goo Dolls singles chronology
"Let Love In" (2006)	"Before It's Too Late (Sam and Mikaela's Theme)" (2007)	"Real" (2008)

Music video
- "Before It's Too Late (Sam and Mikaela's Theme)" on YouTube

"Before It's Too Late (Sam and Mikaela's Theme)" or simply "Before It's Too Late" is a song from the Transformers soundtrack, Transformers: The Album, and the 25th single by the Goo Goo Dolls. It was released on June 5, 2007. The song itself was the first single to be released for the soundtrack reaching 86 on Billboard Hot 100 and 9 on Hot Adult Top 40, although the song, "What I've Done" by Linkin Park was written and used for most of the Transformers promotional purposes. The song was later included on the band's second compilation album Greatest Hits Volume One: The Singles.

== Track listing ==
1. "Before It's Too Late (Sam And Mikaela's Theme)" - 3:02

== Chart positions ==
=== Weekly charts ===
Chart (2007)	Peak position
UK Singles Chart	176
U.S. Billboard Hot 100	86
U.S. Digital Songs	73
U.S. Hot Adult Top 40	9

=== Year-end charts ===
Chart (2007)	Position
US Adult Top 40	37
