= City of Angels (soundtrack) =

Soundtrack album by Various artists
- Released: March 31, 1998
- Genres: Pop; rock
- Length: 71:48
- Label: Warner Bros.

Singles from City of Angels: Music from the Motion Picture
- 1. "Uninvited" Released: February 24, 1998; 2. "If God Will Send His Angels (Remix)" Released: March 2, 1998; 3. "Iris" Released: April 7, 1998; 4. "Angel" Released: September 28, 1998

City of Angels: Music from the Motion Picture is the soundtrack album for the film City of Angels, released by Warner Bros. Records on March 31, 1998.

== Reception ==
Professional ratings
Review scores
Source	Rating
AllMusic	3/5 stars
National Catholic Reporter	(positive)

Yahoo! Music's Craig Rosen, who called the album "a stroke of marketing genius", speculated that executive producer Rob Cavallo, who was head of Alanis Morissette and the Goo Goo Dolls' management firm, "was instrumental in making sure the soundtrack provided a nice set-up for the forthcoming Morissette and Goo Goo Dolls albums [Supposed Former Infatuation Junkie and Dizzy Up the Girl, respectively] ... Record executives and managers love big hits from soundtracks, especially when they dovetail into a new release by one of their artists. That's the case with both Morissette and the Goo Goo Dolls and it's not a mere coincidence." Bob Bell, a new release buyer for the Wherehouse Entertainment chain of stores in Torrance, California, said the marketing of the album was "amazing" and attributed its early strong sales to Morissette's "Uninvited". He said of the Goo Goo Dolls that the soundtrack "helped to re-establish them ... [it] brought them back into our minds". Robert Scally wrote of "Uninvited", "Placing exclusives on soundtracks ... has been a successful tactic for creating a buzz around the album while highlighting the musical artist".

== Commercial performance ==
The City of Angels soundtrack debuted at number 23 on the Billboard 200 chart on the issue dated 18 April 1998. The following week it entered the top ten at number seven and eventually reached the runner-up position for three weeks until it topped the charts in early June, selling 165,000 copies. City of Angels finished the year as the seventh highest-selling album of 1998. To date the soundtrack has sold 5.5 million units in the United States and has been certified five times Platinum by the Recording Industry Association of America. Additionally, it peaked at number three on the Canadian charts and has sold over 700,000 copies in the country.

Elsewhere, the soundtrack also performed well, reaching number one in Australia, Germany, New Zealand and Switzerland. It has been certified Platinum in Japan and multi-Platinum in Australia.

== Singles ==
Its two singles, the Goo Goo Dolls' "Iris" and Alanis Morissette's "Uninvited", were released to U.S. radio in March and were still receiving substantial radio airplay by the following August. An internet and radio leak of "Uninvited" in early March forced Warner Bros. to release the entire soundtrack to radio before it became available in stores. According to a publicity manager for Warner Music Canada, the measure was "an inconvenience" taken to stop radio stations from playing low-quality versions of the song downloaded from the internet. "Iris" reached number one on Billboard's Modern Rock Tracks, Top 40 Mainstream and Adult Top 40 charts in the U.S., and it spent a record amount of time atop the Hot 100 Airplay chart. "Uninvited" reached number one on the Top 40 Mainstream and peaked inside the top five on the Adult Top 40.

== Track listing ==
No.	Title	Writer(s)	Producer(s)	Length
1.	"If God Will Send His Angels" (performed by U2)	U2 (music); Bono (lyrics); The Edge (lyrics)	Flood; Howie B; Steve Osborne	4:31
2.	"Uninvited" (performed by Alanis Morissette)	Alanis Morissette	Rob Cavallo; Alanis Morissette	4:34
3.	"Red House" (performed by Jimi Hendrix)	Jimi Hendrix	Chas Chandler	3:49
4.	"Feelin' Love" (performed by Paula Cole)	Paula Cole	Paula Cole	5:37
5.	"Mama, You Got A Daughter" (performed by John Lee Hooker)	John Lee Hooker		3:41
6.	"Angel" (performed by Sarah McLachlan)	Sarah McLachlan	Pierre Marchand	4:29
7.	"Iris" (performed by Goo Goo Dolls)	John Rzeznik	Cavallo; Goo Goo Dolls	4:50
8.	"I Grieve" (performed by Peter Gabriel)	Peter Gabriel	Peter Gabriel	8:09
9.	"I Know" (performed by Jude)	Jude Christodal	Clif Magness; Steve Griffen (assoc.)	4:34
10.	"Further On Up the Road" (performed by Eric Clapton)	Joe Medwick Veasey; Don D. Robey	Tom Dowd	7:26
11.	"An Angel Falls" (performed by Gabriel Yared)	Gabriel Yared	Gabriel Yared	4:54
12.	"The Unfeeling Kiss" (performed by Gabriel Yared)	Yared	Yared	3:42
13.	"Spreading Wings" (performed by Gabriel Yared)	Yared	Yared	4:25
14.	"City of Angels" (performed by Gabriel Yared)	Yared	Yared	7:07
Total length:				71:48

== Personnel ==
- George Acogny – consultant (track 8)
- Howie B – engineer and mixing (track 1)
- James Barton – mixing (track 9)
- Tony Berg – feedback (track 8)
- John Bell – orchestration (tracks 11–14)
- Dario Rossetti Bonell – acoustic guitar solo (tracks 11–14)
- Carlos Bonnell – acoustic guitar solo (tracks 11–14)
- Danny Bramson – soundtrack producer, music supervisor
- Francis Buckley – engineer (track 9)
- Greg Burns – second engineer (tracks 2, 7)
- David Campbell – string arrangements (tracks 2, 7)
- Rob Cavallo – acoustic guitar (track 2)
- Chris Chaney – bass (track 2)
- Dickie Chappell – engineer and programming (track 8)
- Jude Christodal – vocals and acoustic guitar (track 9)
- Jason Cienkus – soundtrack coordinator
- Alan Coleman – assistant engineer (track 8)
- Katherine Delaney – package design
- Meabh Flynn – assistant engineer (track 8)
- Doug Frank – executive in charge of music for Warner Sunset
- Peter Gabriel – programming, bass, keyboards, and sampling (track 8)
- Ben Georgiades – engineer (tracks 11–14)
- Keith Grant – engineer (tracks 11–14)
- Steve Griffen – additional engineering (track 9)
- Isobel Griffiths – orchestra contractor (tracks 11–14)
- Steve Hall – mastering
- Chris Haynes – second engineer (track 2)
- Ben Hillier – mixing assistant (tracks 11–14)
- Chris Hughes – feedback (track 8)
- Paul Hulme – engineer (tracks 11–14)
- Alan Jenkins – synthesizer programming (tracks 11–14)
- Carl Kaller – film music editor
- Manu Katché – drums (track 8)
- Paul Kimble – Chamberlin (track 9)
- Rob Kirwan – assistant engineer (track 1)
- Carys Lane – vocal soloist (tracks 11–14)
- Nick Lashley – acoustic guitar (track 2)
- Dave Lawson – synthesizer programming (tracks 11–14)
- Gary LeMel – executive in charge of music for Warner Sunset
- Tony Levin – bass (track 8)
- Jolie Levine-Aller – project coordinator (track 9)
- Ling Ling Li – assistant music editor (tracks 11–14)
- Brian MacLeod – drums (track 9)
- Pat Magnarella – executive producer
- Clif Magness – electric guitar (track 9)
- Dominique Mahut – percussion (track 8)
- Mike Malinin – drums and percussion (track 7)
- Pierre Marchand – engineer and mixing (track 6)
- Conal Markey – assistant engineer and mixing assistant (track 1)
- Metro Voices – choir (tracks 11–14)
- Alanis Morissette – vocals (track 2)
- Roger Moutenot – engineer and mixing (track 4)
- Jamie Muhoberac – keyboards (track 2), piano (tracks 2, 7)
- Gary Novak – drums and percussion (track 2)
- Jennie O'Grady – choir director (tracks 11–14)
- Steve Osborne – mixing (track 1)
- Matt Palmer – assistant engineer (tracks 11–14)
- Tim Pierce – mandolin and electric guitar (track 7)
- Damir Prcic – Chamberlin (track 9)
- Jack Joseph Puig – mixing (track 7)
- Harry Rabinowitz – conductor (tracks 11–14)
- Robert Randles – music editor (tracks 11–14)
- David Rhodes – guitar and feedback (track 8)
- Carmen Rizzo – programming (track 2)
- Georges Rodi – synthesizer programming (tracks 11–14)
- Charles Roven – executive producer
- John Rzeznik – guitar and vocals (track 7)
- Rafa Sardina – second engineer (track 7)
- Bill Sewell – upright bass (track 9)
- Allen Sides – engineer (tracks 2, 7), mixing (track 2)
- Kenneth Sillito – orchestra leader and violin soloist (tracks 11–14)
- Ian Silvester – technical coordinator (tracks 11–14)
- Mark "Spike" Stent – engineer and mixing (track 1)
- Alex Swift – programming (track 8)
- Robby Takac – bass (track 7)
- Scott Welch – executive producer
- Kirsty Whalley – synthesizer programming (tracks 11–14)
- Will White – percussion (track 8)
- Rolf Wilson – orchestra leader and violin soloist (tracks 11–14)
- Nick Wollage – assistant engineer (tracks 11–14)
- Gabriel Yared – orchestration (tracks 11–14)

== Charts ==
=== Weekly charts ===
Chart (1998)	Peak position
Australian Albums (ARIA)	1
Austrian Albums (Ö3 Austria)	2
Belgian Albums (Ultratop Flanders)	8
Belgian Albums (Ultratop Wallonia)	21
Canada Top Albums/CDs (RPM)	3
Dutch Albums (Album Top 100)	28
European Albums (Billboard)	2
French Albums (SNEP)	31
German Albums (Offizielle Top 100)	1
Irish Albums (IRMA)	9
Malaysian Albums (RIM)	4
New Zealand Albums (RMNZ)	1
Norwegian Albums (VG-lista)	3
Scottish Albums (Official Charts)	51
Swedish Albums (Sverigetopplistan)	29
Swiss Albums (Schweizer Hitparade)	1
UK Compilation Albums (Official Charts)	18
US Billboard 200	1
Chart (2003)	Peak position
UK Soundtrack Albums (Official Charts)	13

=== Year-end charts ===
Chart (1998)	Position
German Albums Chart	25

=== End of decade charts ===
Chart (1990–1999)	Position
U.S. Billboard 200	49

== Sales and certifications ==
Region	Certification	Certified units/sales
Australia (ARIA)	2× Platinum	140,000^{^}
Austria (IFPI Austria)	Gold	25,000^{*}
Brazil (Pro-Música Brasil)	Gold	100,000^{*}
Canada (Music Canada)	7× Platinum	700,000^{^}
Germany (BVMI)	Gold	250,000^{^}
Japan (RIAJ)	Platinum	200,000^{^}
New Zealand (RMNZ)	Platinum	15,000^{^}
Norway (IFPI Norway)	Gold	25,000^{*}
Switzerland (IFPI Switzerland)	Gold	25,000^{^}
United Kingdom (BPI)	Gold	100,000^{^}
United States (RIAA)	5× Platinum	5,500,000
^{*} Sales figures based on certification alone.^{^} Shipments figures based on certification alone.

== See also ==
- Best-selling albums in the United States since Nielsen SoundScan tracking began
- Number-one albums of 1998 (U.S.)
