= Transformers: The Album =

Soundtrack album by Various Artists
- Released: June 26, 2007
- Recorded: 2006–2007
- Genres: Alternative rock; alternative metal
- Length: 47:31
- Label: Warner Bros.
- Producers: Diarmuid Quinn; Jeff Aldrich; Mike Shinoda

Alternative cover
- Alternative cover

Singles from Transformers: The Album
- 1. "What I've Done" Released: April 2, 2007; 2. "Before It's Too Late (Sam and Mikaela's Theme)" Released: June 5, 2007

Professional ratings
Review scores
Source	Rating
AllMusic	2/5 stars
Soundtrack.Net	2.5/5 stars
Common Sense Media	3/5 stars

Transformers: The Album is a compilation album of various artists music from the blockbuster film Transformers (2007). The official single from the album is "Before It's Too Late (Sam and Mikaela's Theme)" by the Goo Goo Dolls.

The first single "What I've Done" by Linkin Park was 6× Platinum certified by RIAA in the United States, 2× Platinum in Germany, and gold in Japan. The soundtrack debuted at number 21 on the U.S Billboard 200, selling about 32,000 copies in its first week. The album has sold 150,000 copies. Each group on the album, except for Julien-K, was signed to a label owned by Warner Music Group at the time of the album's release. Tracks 7, 9, 10, and 12 do not appear in the actual film.

== Track listing ==
No.	Title	Writer(s)	Producer(s)	Length
1.	"What I've Done" (Linkin Park)	Linkin Park	Rick Rubin; Mike Shinoda	3:25
2.	"Doomsday Clock" (The Smashing Pumpkins)	William Patrick Corgan	Billy Corgan; Jimmy Chamberlin	3:45
3.	"This Moment" (Disturbed)	Disturbed	Johnny K; Disturbed	3:05
4.	"Before It's Too Late (Sam and Mikaela's Theme)" (Goo Goo Dolls)	John Rzeznik	Richard and The Twins	3:05
5.	"Pretty Handsome Awkward" (The Used)	The Used	John Feldmann	3:35
6.	"Passion's Killing Floor" (HIM)	Ville Valo	Tim Palmer; Hiili Hiilesmaa (co.); HIM (co.)	5:14
7.	"What's It Feel Like to Be a Ghost?" (Taking Back Sunday)	Taking Back Sunday	Eric Valentine	3:43
8.	"Second to None" (Styles of Beyond featuring Mike Shinoda)	Ryan Maginn; Takbir Bashir; Mike Shinoda	Mike Shinoda	3:07
9.	"End of the World" (Armor for Sleep)	Ben Jorgensen; Armor for Sleep	Machine	4:10
10.	"Retina and the Sky" (Idiot Pilot)	Michael Harris; Daniel Anderson	Ross Robinson; Idiot Pilot; Mark Hoppus (co.)	3:37
11.	"Technical Difficulties" (Julien-K)	Amir Derakh; Ryan Shuck; Anthony Valcic	Julien-K	4:22
12.	"Transformers Theme" (Mutemath)	Anne Bryant; Doug Aldrich; Ford Kinder; Norman Swan	Mute Math; Tedd Tjornhom	2:46
Total length:				47:31

=== Not included in the soundtrack ===
#	Title	Performer(s)	Notes
1	"Drive"	The Cars	Played on Bumblebee's radio after Mikaela Banes dumps Trent at the park, prompting Sam Witwicky to offer her a ride.
2	"Sexual Healing"	Marvin Gaye	Played on Bumblebee's radio before he drives Sam Witwicky and Mikaela Banes over a romantic view on a hillside.
3	"I Got You (I Feel Good)"	James Brown	Played by Bumblebee as Sam Witwicky kicks the radio before Mikaela Banes steps out to look at his engine.
4	"Baby Come Back"	Player	Played on Bumblebee's radio after he turns over his engine, prompting Sam Witwicky to drive Mikaela Banes home.
5	"Battle Without Honor or Humanity"	Tomoyasu Hotei	Played to introduce Bumblebee's new look.

== Chart performance ==
Chart (2007)	Peak position
US Soundtrack Albums (Billboard)	2
US Top Hard Rock Albums (Billboard)	6
US Top Alternative Albums (Billboard)	12
US Billboard 200	21
US Top Album Sales (Billboard)	21

== See also ==
- Transformers: The Score
