= Big Machine (Goo Goo Dolls song) =

Single by Goo Goo Dolls

from the album Gutterflower
- Released: September 17, 2002
- Genre: Alternative rock, pop rock
- Length: 3:09
- Label: Warner Bros.
- Songwriter: Johnny Rzeznik
- Producers: Rob Cavallo, Goo Goo Dolls

Goo Goo Dolls singles chronology
"Here Is Gone" (2002)	"Big Machine" (2002)	"Sympathy" (2003)

"Big Machine" is a song by the Goo Goo Dolls, first released on their Gutterflower album in 2002. It was written by lead vocalist/guitarist Johnny Rzeznik, who calls it his "disco song" and describes its meaning as "a propulsive tale of unrequited love". This song's drums were on a drum machine, and it was called "Disco". This song was written about the people in LA, and the way of life, as told on VH1's Storytellers.

== Track listings ==
U.S. promo CD

1. "Big Machine" - 3:10

Australian CD single

1. "Big Machine" - 3:10
2. "Black Balloon" - 4:01
3. "Broadway" - 3:50

== Live versions ==
The song was performed live as the opener for the band's Independence Day concert, and was filmed for the Live in Buffalo: July 4th, 2004 DVD release.

== Chart positions ==
Chart (2002)	Peak position
Australia (ARIA Charts)	77
Canada (Nielsen SoundScan)	18
US Billboard Hot 100	64
US Adult Pop Airplay (Billboard)	10
US Pop Airplay (Billboard)	31
