= Lance Diamond =

American radio personality (1945–2015)

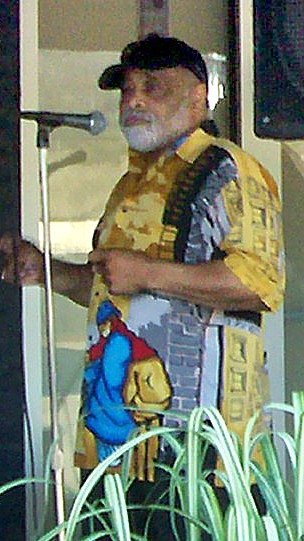
Lance Diamond in 2007

Lance Diamond (born William Shingles; July 3, 1945 – January 4, 2015) was an American lounge singer and radio personality based in Buffalo, New York, whose career spanned over 40 years.

== Career ==
Diamond, together with his band the 24 Karat Diamond Band, played many classic rock and disco-era songs. He often called himself the "Love Doctor," getting the name from his radio show, Saturday Night Fever which he hosted Saturday evenings on 96.1 WJYE (now WTSS) featuring love music. His success in Buffalo led him to receive offers to lead shows in Las Vegas, which he declined due to his preference to stay in Buffalo.

Diamond played with the Goo Goo Dolls live, as well as recording with them on the tracks "Down on the Corner", "Never Take the Place of Your Man", "My Girl", "Do You Believe", and "Bitch." Diamond and the Goo Goo Dolls performed "Bitch" on the 1993 AIDS-Benefit Album No Alternative produced by the Red Hot Organization. Diamond met Goo Goo Dolls' bassist Robby Takac after Takac moved into the apartment directly below him in a Buffalo apartment building.

He was deemed Buffalo's "best individual vocalist", "king of charisma" and best "genre-defying act" by Buffalo's ARTVOICE. He also performed twice at Melody Fair, a famous performing arts venue in North Tonawanda, NY.

In his last years, Diamond was a regular performer in Buffalo's Elmwood Village and performed at The Elmwood Lounge, a local tavern in Elmwood Village, on a weekly basis until shortly before his death.

== Awards ==
- Buffalo Music Hall of Fame 1992

== Death ==
Diamond died on January 4, 2015, a few days after being hospitalized due to heart complications that prevented him from performing his annual New Year's Eve show. He was 69 and believed to have no spouse or children (his sister announced his death), although his secretive nature meant that very little of his personal life was known to the public.

In 2017, Diamond was the subject of the documentary A Diamond in the Buff, co-directed by Kevin Polowy and Brandon Rae. Polowy was able to secure three interviews from the notoriously secretive Diamond before his death, which were incorporated into the film.
