= Let Love In (song) =

Single by Goo Goo Dolls

from the album Let Love In
- Released: October 2, 2006
- Recorded: 2006
- Genre: Alternative rock
- Length: 5:01 (album version); 4:15 (radio edit)
- Label: Warner Bros. Records
- Songwriters: Rzeznik, Ballard, Gregg Wattenberg
- Producer: Glen Ballard

Goo Goo Dolls singles chronology
"Stay with You" (2006)	"Let Love In" (2006)	"Before It's Too Late (Sam and Mikaela's Theme)" (2007)

"Let Love In" is the third and final single from the Goo Goo Dolls' eighth studio album, Let Love In.

== Track listing ==
1. "Let Love In (Rock Version)" - 5:00
2. "Let Love In (Radio Edit)" - 4:15

== Music video ==
The video was directed by PR Brown, and features the band performing the song, intercut with subliminal flashes of words that progress from "hunger" "war", "abuse", and the like to words such as "joy" "peace" "amazing", and "beautiful". Throughout the song, there are images of several people, including the band members. Each person is facing a slightly different angle, each one more clockwise than the last. By the end of the song, the people have completed one clockwise turn. Their expressions have also turned from sadness and defeat to hopeful, peaceful smiles.

== Uses in popular culture ==
- The song was used in a controversial 2006 television advertisement for Trojan Condoms. The commercial was pulled shortly after a negative reaction, with many thinking that the title of the song seemed a little too tongue-in-cheek for a prophylactic ad.
- NBC also used this song in a clip to promote the television show The Office. The clip followed the story of Jim and Pam, prior to the episode "The Negotiation". Steve Carell has also listed it as one of his favorite songs on iTunes.

== Chart positions ==
=== Weekly charts ===
Chart (2006)	Peak position
Canada Hot AC (Billboard)	4
US Adult Contemporary (Billboard)	28
US Adult Pop Airplay (Billboard)	9
US Bubbling Under Hot 100 (Billboard)	1
U.S. Billboard Hot Pop 100	75

=== Year-end charts ===
Chart (2007)	Position
US Adult Top 40 (Billboard)	32

== Certifications ==
Region	Certification	Certified units/sales
United States (RIAA)	Gold	500,000^{‡}
^{‡} Sales+streaming figures based on certification alone.

== Release history ==
Release dates and formats for "Let Love In"
Region	Date	Format	Label(s)	Ref.
United States	October 3, 2006	Mainstream airplay	Silvertone; Jive; Zomba	
