= Gutterflower =

Studio album by the Goo Goo Dolls
- Released: April 9, 2002
- Recorded: August–December 2001 at Icon Recording Studios and Capitol Studios, Hollywood, CA, and House of Blues Studios, Encino, CA
- Genre: Alternative rock
- Length: 41:36
- Label: Warner Bros.
- Producer: Goo Goo Dolls; Rob Cavallo

The Goo Goo Dolls chronology
What I Learned About Ego, Opinion, Art & Commerce (2001)	Gutterflower (2002)	Live in Buffalo: July 4th, 2004 (2004)

Singles from Gutterflower
- 1. "Here Is Gone" Released: March 5, 2002; 2. "Big Machine" Released: September 17, 2002

Professional ratings
Aggregate scores
Source	Rating
Metacritic	72/100
Review scores
Source	Rating
AbsolutePunk	(91%)
AllMusic	4/5 stars
The A.V. Club	(average)
Blender	3/5 stars
Entertainment Weekly	C+
PopMatters	9/10 stars
Q	3/5 stars
Rock Hard	(8/10)
Rolling Stone	3.5/5 stars
Slant	2.5/5 stars

Gutterflower is the seventh studio album by American rock band the Goo Goo Dolls. It was released in 2002 on Warner Bros. Records. It is the follow-up to their critically successful albums Dizzy Up the Girl and A Boy Named Goo. The album was commercially successful upon its release, hitting No. 4 on the Billboard 200, their highest position on the chart.

== Track listing ==
All tracks are written by Johnny Rzeznik, except where noted.

No.	Title	Writer(s)	Length
1.	"Big Machine"		3:10
2.	"Think About Me"		3:58
3.	"Here Is Gone"		3:58
4.	"You Never Know"	Robby Takac	3:08
5.	"What a Scene"		4:24
6.	"Up, Up, Up"	Takac	2:58
7.	"It's Over"		3:35
8.	"Sympathy"		2:58
9.	"What Do You Need?"		3:48
10.	"Smash"	Takac	2:26
11.	"Tucked Away"	Takac	3:13
12.	"Truth Is a Whisper"		4:00

== Singles ==
"Here Is Gone" and "Big Machine" have been the only two songs released from this album as singles and videos have been created for both. A video for the promotional single "Sympathy" was also released.

=== "Big Machine" ===
John Rzeznik refers to this as his "disco song". "I'm really horrible at programming drum machines, but this was like pattern 74 on my drum machine, which said 'disco.' I called all my friends and said, 'Check this out, this is my disco song!'" He describes it as "a propulsive tale of unrequited love". "Big Machine" was occasionally performed live on a smashed Stratocaster guitar that Rzeznik has fondly nicknamed "The Half-Caster". Despite being smashed in half, it still plays. It can be seen in a 2002 VH1 Storytellers special. Rzeznik stated that he had someone fix it up and it works just fine.

=== "Here Is Gone" ===
John Rzeznik wrote this song on the phone while talking to a friend. He asked his friend if he should "take the chords up or take 'em down?" and the friend told him to "take 'em up" and that's how he came up with the chorus and the rest of the song came together shortly thereafter.

According to Rzeznik in 2007, the video for this song cost more to produce than the entire Gutterflower album itself.

== Reception ==
- Upon release, Gutterflower received generally positive reviews from critics. In fact, although The Goo Goo Dolls' multi-platinum album Dizzy Up the Girl (which was Gutterflower's predecessor) sold around 3,000,000 more albums than Gutterflower, reviews were equally positive.
- In 2005, Gutterflower was ranked number 499 in Rock Hard magazine's book of The 500 Greatest Rock & Metal Albums of All Time.

== Personnel ==
Goo Goo Dolls

- Johnny Rzeznik – vocals, guitars
- Robby Takac – vocals, bass
- Mike Malinin – drums

Guest musicians

- Rob Cavallo
- Luis Conte
- Jamie Muhoberac
- Tim Pierce
- Greg Suran

Technical personnel

- Rob Cavallo – producer
- Goo Goo Dolls – producers
- Ken Allardyce – engineer
- Allen Sides – engineer
- Doug McKean – Pro Tools engineer, additional programming
- Dan Chase – Pro Tools engineer
- Jimmy Hoyson – 2nd engineer
- Steve Genewick – 2nd engineer
- Joe Brown – 2nd engineer
- Kevin Meeker – 2nd engineer
- Tom Lord-Alge – mixing (1-6, 8-11)
- Ed Cherney – mixing (7, 12)
- Brett Allen – guitar technician
- Garner Knutson – drum technician
- Mike Fasano – drum technician
- Kim Bullard – additional programming
- Robert Vosgien – mastering

== Charts ==
=== Weekly charts ===
Weekly chart performance for Gutterflower
Chart (2002)	Peak position
Australian Albums (ARIA)	23
Canadian Albums (Billboard)	8
German Albums (Offizielle Top 100)	43
Italian Albums (FIMI)	41
New Zealand Albums (RMNZ)	37
Scottish Albums (OCC)	40
Swedish Albums (Sverigetopplistan)	20
Swiss Albums (Schweizer Hitparade)	89
UK Albums (OCC)	56
US Billboard 200	4

=== Year-end charts ===
Year-end chart performance for Gutterflower
Chart (2002)	Position
Canadian Albums (Nielsen SoundScan)	173
Canadian Alternative Albums (Nielsen SoundScan)	54
US Billboard 200	164

== Certifications ==
Certifications for Gutterflower
Region	Certification	Certified units/sales
United States (RIAA)	Gold	500,000^{^}
^{^} Shipments figures based on certification alone.
