= Better Days (Goo Goo Dolls song) =

Song recorded by the Goo Goo Dolls

Single by the Goo Goo Dolls

from the album Let Love In
- Released: September 20, 2005
- Length: 3:35
- Label: Warner Bros.
- Songwriter: John Rzeznik
- Producer: Glen Ballard

The Goo Goo Dolls singles chronology
"Give a Little Bit" (2004)	"Better Days" (2005)	"Stay with You" (2006)

Music video
- "Better Days" on YouTube

"Better Days" is a song recorded by the Goo Goo Dolls. It was released in September 2005 as the first single off the album, Let Love In. The song peaked at number 36 on the US Billboard Hot 100 chart, and also rose up to number 3 on the Billboard Hot Adult Top 40 Tracks chart.

== Content ==
The song was originally performed for a Target store-branded Christmas album; the song, in a rare occurrence for a general pop song, makes several references to Christmas, including a direct reference to "the one poor Child who saved this world". A re-recording of the song appears on the 2020 album It's Christmas All Over.

== In popular culture ==
ABC and CNN used it as their theme for the Katrina coverage. The song was featured on the pilot episode of CBS' 2006 TV series, Jericho. The song was performed live on September 25, 2006, prior to the New Orleans Saints return to the Superdome, The song also featured as the theme of WWE Tribute to the Troops 2006, a special broadcast of WWE Raw which aired on Christmas night 2006. During a special "After the Storms" episode of Extreme Makeover: Home Edition, the Goo Goo Dolls performed this song for the residents of Sabine Pass, TX, which was hit by Hurricane Rita in September 2005. It was also used in many tributes following the Virginia Tech massacre that occurred on April 16, 2007. At Orlando Magic home games, the song is played after every loss.

Canadian journalist and politician Michael Ignatieff used an altered version of the song for his campaign video at the Liberal Party of Canada's 2006 Leadership Convention. The version of the song featured in his video had some altered lyrics, and contained a verse in French. When speaking at the convention, Ignatieff began his speech by saying "Tonight is the night the Liberal party begins again," mimicking a lyric from Better Days.

Viewed by many as a great song for tough times, "Better Days" was chosen as the theme song for the Buffalo Sabres 2007 Stanley Cup Playoffs run, and General Electric features the song in its spring, 2009, television ad campaign. In 2008, the police drama series Cold Case featured it as the first of six songs played throughout its fifth-season finale "Ghost of My Child". It was used in the trailer for the 2009 film Love Happens and it is the theme song for the NBC show, Who Do You Think You Are?. The song can also be heard in the 2011 film New Year's Eve.

Goo Goo Dolls lead singer John Rzeznik performed an acoustic version of this, among other songs, from his front porch during the COVID-19 pandemic. The event was live-streamed on Facebook, and throughout the performance, Rzeznik encouraged his fans to do their part to prevent the spread of the virus by "staying home and watching Netflix", and ordering takeout to support local restaurants.

== Music video ==
The music video for the song was filmed in Malibu, California.

== Track listings ==
=== Initial pressing ===
1. "Better Days" – 3:35
2. "We'll Be Here (When You're Gone) (Acoustic)" – 3:24

=== Alternate pressing ===
1. "Better Days" – 3:35
2. "Iris" – 4:51
3. "Better Days (Acoustic)" – 3:31
4. "Better Days" (Video)

=== Vinyl pressing ===
1. "Better Days" – 3:35
2. "We'll Be Here (When You're Gone) (Acoustic)" – 3:24

== Charts ==
=== Weekly charts ===
Chart (2005–2006)	Peak position
Canada (Nielsen SoundScan)	5
Canada AC Top 30 (Radio & Records)	19
Canada Hot AC Top 30 (Radio & Records)	2
Scotland Singles (OCC)	43
UK Singles (OCC)	81
UK Rock & Metal (OCC)	5
US Billboard Hot 100	36
US Adult Pop Airplay (Billboard)	3
US Adult Contemporary (Billboard)	17
US Pop 100 (Billboard)	34

=== Year-end charts ===
Chart (2006)	Positions
US Adult Top 40 (Billboard)	12

== Certifications ==
Region	Certification	Certified units/sales
United States (RIAA)	Platinum	1,000,000^{‡}
^{‡} Sales+streaming figures based on certification alone.

== Release history ==
Release dates and formats for "Better Days"
Region	Date	Format	Label(s)	Ref.
United States	January 17, 2006	Mainstream airplay	Warner Bros.	
