= Broadway (Goo Goo Dolls song) =

2000 single by Goo Goo Dolls

- German maxi-single artwork

Single by Goo Goo Dolls

from the album Dizzy Up the Girl
- Released: March 27, 2000
- Length: 3:58
- Label: Warner Bros.
- Songwriter: John Rzeznik
- Producers: Rob Cavallo; Goo Goo Dolls

Goo Goo Dolls singles chronology
"Black Balloon" (1999)	"Broadway" (2000)	"Here Is Gone" (2002)

Music video
- "Broadway" on YouTube

"Broadway" is a song recorded by American rock band Goo Goo Dolls. The song was released in March 2000 as the last single from their sixth studio album, Dizzy Up the Girl (1998). The song entered the top 30 in the United States, peaking at number 24 on the Billboard Hot 100 and coming in at number 84 on the Billboard year-end Hot 100 singles of 2000. The single also peaked number seven on the Canadian RPM 100 Hit Tracks chart and number six on the Icelandic Singles Chart.

== Content ==
The song refers to the Broadway-Fillmore neighborhood of Buffalo, New York, a lower income, working-class neighborhood in which songwriter John Rzeznik grew up. It also describes Rzeznik's difficult relationship with his alcoholic father, who died when Rzeznik was 15, and the "cycle of destruction" that he witnessed in the neighborhood. The lyrics "See the young man sittin' in the old man's bar / Waitin' for his turn to die" specifically refers to a common occurrence he saw in the bar he and his father frequented:

"When I was young, my dad used to take me down to the local bar, prop me up on the barstool, order a drink for himself, and a soda and chips for me. He'd give me a quarter for the pinball machine and sit there and drink. I'd look around and see all these kids who just turned 18, and they were hanging out there, sitting in the same chairs as their fathers. When they were old enough to drink with their dads, they took his place at the bar, carrying on the tradition. I decided I didn't want to be like that."

— John Rzeznik

== Track listings ==
German maxi-CD single

1. "Broadway" (album version)
2. "Naked" (live version)
3. "Black Balloon" (live version)

Australian maxi-CD single

1. "Broadway" – 3:57
2. "Black Balloon" – 4:11
3. "Slide" – 3:32
4. "Naked" (live) – 3:55
5. "Black Balloon" (live) – 3:42

== Charts ==
=== Weekly charts ===
Chart (2000)	Peak position
Australia (ARIA)	66
Canada Top Singles (RPM)	7
Canada Adult Contemporary (RPM)	22
Canada Rock/Alternative (RPM)	9
Iceland (Íslenski Listinn Topp 40)	6
US Billboard Hot 100	24
US Adult Alternative Airplay (Billboard)	10
US Adult Pop Airplay (Billboard)	5
US Alternative Airplay (Billboard)	38
US Pop Airplay (Billboard)	15

=== Year-end charts ===
Chart (2000)	Position
Iceland (Íslenski Listinn Topp 40)	66
US Billboard Hot 100	84
US Adult Top 40 (Billboard)	13
US Mainstream Top 40 (Billboard)	54

== Release history ==
Region	Date	Format(s)	Label(s)	Ref(s).
United States	March 27, 2000	Adult contemporary; hot adult contemporary; modern adult contemporary radio	Warner Bros.	
United States	March 28, 2000	Contemporary hit; alternative radio	Warner Bros.	
