= Sympathy (Goo Goo Dolls song) =

Promotional single by Goo Goo Dolls

from the album Gutterflower
- Released: February 18, 2003
- Genre: Acoustic rock
- Length: 2:58
- Label: Warner Bros.
- Songwriter: Johnny Rzeznik
- Producers: Rob Cavallo; Goo Goo Dolls

Music video
- "Sympathy" on YouTube

"Sympathy" is a song by the Goo Goo Dolls. The song was used as a promotional single released from their album Gutterflower. The song appeared on the soundtrack to the film A Cinderella Story and also in an episode of the show "Charmed", as well as an episode of Third Watch. It was shortened to about 2:48 on the soundtrack with some of the lyrics edited for the film's target audience.

== Track listings ==
Promotional CD single

1. "Sympathy" — 2:58

Promotional 7"

Warner Bros. 16663

1. "Sympathy"
2. "Think About Me"

== Music video ==
The "Sympathy" music video was shot in Las Vegas, Nevada in 2002 and produced by Tony Bongiovi. The video, mostly taking place in the back of a taxi cab, is described by the band as a "guerrilla video." The video was slightly based on the T.V. show Taxicab Confessions, as the band's previous touring keyboardist, Dave Schulz, was featured in an episode of the show and as a result was fired from the band. In the video, singer/guitarist John, is supposed to be "invisible" to the other people who come and go in the taxi.

== Charts ==
Chart (2003)	Peak position
US Adult Pop Airplay (Billboard)	10
US Bubbling Under Hot 100 (Billboard)	15

== Certifications ==
Region	Certification	Certified units/sales
United States (RIAA)	Gold	500,000^{‡}
^{‡} Sales+streaming figures based on certification alone.
