= Black Balloon (Goo Goo Dolls song) =

1999 single by Goo Goo Dolls

Single by Goo Goo Dolls

from the album Dizzy Up the Girl
- Released: June 7, 1999
- Genre: Alternative rock
- Length: 4:10
- Label: Warner Bros.
- Songwriter: John Rzeznik
- Producers: Rob Cavallo, Goo Goo Dolls

Goo Goo Dolls singles chronology
"Dizzy" (1999)	"Black Balloon" (1999)	"Broadway" (2000)

Music video
- "Black Balloon" on YouTube

"Black Balloon" is a song by American rock band Goo Goo Dolls. It was released in June 1999 as the fourth single from the band's sixth studio album, Dizzy Up the Girl (1998). The single reached No. 3 in Canada, No. 16 in the United States, and No. 23 in Iceland.

== Meaning and composition ==
The song, according to lead singer John Rzeznik, is based on a woman who is struggling with a heroin addiction and her lover who is desperately trying to save her. He has also said that it is about "seeing someone you love that is so great just screw up so bad." Speculation had it that the specific person the song was based on was the ex-wife of bassist Robby Takac; she died of a heroin overdose.

Like many other songs by Goo Goo Dolls, "Black Balloon" uses an unusual alternate tuning. Several electric guitars used in the introduction and the acoustic rhythm guitar are tuned to an open D-flat fifth chord. It was half-stepped on the album version.

== Chart performance ==
The track reached No. 13 and No. 28 on the US Billboard Modern Rock Tracks and Mainstream Rock Tracks charts, respectively. "Black Balloon" was the band's first commercially released single in the US since "Name" in 1995, reaching No. 16 on the Billboard Hot 100 with its combined sales and airplay figures. In Canada, the song reached No. 3 on the RPM 100 Hit Tracks chart, giving the Goo Goo Dolls their fourth top-three hit there. Outside North America, the song charted in Iceland and the United Kingdom, reaching No. 23 in the former country and No. 76 in the latter.

== Music video ==
The video opens with a woman blowing smoke into a soap bubble. It then moves into showing scenes from a 1950s era swim club while the band performs the song. The video was directed by Nancy Bardawil.

== Live performances ==
During live performances of the song, fans can often be seen inflating black balloons and batting them around in the crowd.

== Track listings ==
US CD, 7-inch, and cassette single

1. "Black Balloon" (radio remix) – 4:09
2. "Slide" (live version) – 3:33

Australian CD single

1. "Black Balloon"
2. "Lazy Eye"
3. "Naked" (remix)
4. "Flat Top"

UK CD single

1. "Black Balloon" (radio edit) – 3:59
2. "Black Balloon" (album version) – 4:10
3. "Naked" – 3:44

European CD single

1. "Black Balloon" (radio edit) – 3:59
2. "Naked" – 3:44

== Charts ==
=== Weekly charts ===
Chart (1999)	Peak position
Canada Top Singles (RPM)	3
Canada Adult Contemporary (RPM)	6
Canada Rock/Alternative (RPM)	8
Iceland (Íslenski Listinn Topp 40)	23
Scottish Singles Sales (Official Charts)	77
UK Singles (Official Charts)	76
UK Indie (Official Charts)	14
US Billboard Hot 100	16
US Adult Alternative Airplay (Billboard)	3
US Adult Pop Airplay (Billboard)	3
US Alternative Airplay (Billboard)	13
US Mainstream Rock (Billboard)	28
US Pop Airplay (Billboard)	13

=== Year-end charts ===
Chart (1999)	Position
Canada Top Singles (RPM)	21
Canada Adult Contemporary (RPM)	37
Canada Rock/Alternative (RPM)	42
US Billboard Hot 100	64
US Adult Top 40 (Billboard)	21
US Mainstream Top 40 (Billboard)	39
US Modern Rock Tracks (Billboard)	52
US Top 40 Tracks (Billboard)	40
US Triple-A (Billboard)	15

== Certifications ==
Region	Certification	Certified units/sales
United States (RIAA)	Platinum	1,000,000^{‡}
^{‡} Sales+streaming figures based on certification alone.

== Release history ==
Region	Date	Format(s)	Label(s)	Ref(s).
United States	June 7, 1999	Active rock radio	Warner Bros.	
United States	June 8, 1999	Contemporary hit radio	Warner Bros.	
United Kingdom	February 14, 2000	CD; cassette	Hollywood; Edel; Third Rail	
