= Mike Malinin =

American drummer (b. 1967)

- Born: Michael Theodore Malinin; October 10, 1967 (age 59); Washington, D.C., U.S.
- Genres: Rock; alternative rock; pop rock
- Occupations: Musician, Mentor, Educator
- Years active: 1994–present

Michael Theodore Malinin (born October 10, 1967) is an American musician known for his work as drummer of the Goo Goo Dolls. He played drums for Tanya Tucker from July 2016 to February 2023, and now plays with the Nashville based band, The FBR. Mike also runs a mastermind club, Practical Drumming.

== Career ==
Malinin began playing drums in middle school and later studied music at the University of North Texas. While there, Malinin played in the band Caulk, and recorded their first EP with them before leaving the band. Afterwards, Malinin moved to Los Angeles to pursue music full-time. From December 1994 until December 27, 2013, Malinin played drums for the Goo Goo Dolls.

From 2016 to 2023, Malinin worked as drummer for Tanya Tucker.

In July 2026, Malinin launched Practical Drumming, an online drumming mentorship platform.
