= Dizzy Up the Girl =

Studio album by Goo Goo Dolls
- Released: September 22, 1998
- Recorded: 1997–98
- Genres: Alternative rock; pop rock; power pop
- Length: 45:27
- Label: Warner Bros.
- Producers: Rob Cavallo; Goo Goo Dolls

Goo Goo Dolls chronology
Bang! (1997)	Dizzy Up the Girl (1998)	What I Learned About Ego, Opinion, Art & Commerce (2001)

Singles from Dizzy Up the Girl
- 1. "Iris" Released: April 1, 1998; 2. "Slide" Released: September 17, 1998; 3. "Dizzy" Released: February 5, 1999; 4. "Black Balloon" Released: June 7, 1999; 5. "Broadway" Released: March 27, 2000

Dizzy Up the Girl is the sixth studio album by American rock band Goo Goo Dolls, released on September 22, 1998, through Warner Bros. Records. The album is often noted for being the release which propelled the Goo Goo Dolls into a higher tier of stardom, although they had already scored a Billboard top five hit with the downbeat track "Name" in 1995. Dizzy features more mainstream compositions than they had previously recorded. It is also the band's first album to feature drummer Mike Malinin.

== History ==
Dizzy Up the Girl is the Goo Goo Dolls' most successful album to date, selling over 5 million copies (5× platinum certified). The success of Dizzy Up the Girl can largely be attributed to the rock ballad "Iris", which was also included on the soundtrack album of the film City of Angels. "Iris" immediately reached No. 1 on the Hot 100 Airplay chart upon its release in March from the City of Angels soundtrack, and stayed on top for 18 weeks, setting a record that stood for almost 22 years until it was surpassed in 2020 by "Blinding Lights" by the Weeknd. The song also reached No. 1 on the Billboard Modern Rock chart, the Adult Top 40 and Mainstream Top 40 charts, along with several other charts in the US and UK, and received three Grammy nominations. The album sold very well, with "Iris" and "Slide" being the two most successful singles, while the other three singles achieved modest success.

In addition to the huge success of "Iris" (US No. 9), Dizzy Up the Girl included three additional top-40 singles, with the songs "Slide" (US No. 8), "Broadway" (US No. 24), and "Black Balloon" (US No. 16). The album also produced the moderately popular song "Dizzy", which has since become a fan favorite. Along with top-40 single status, music videos for all five singles reached VH1's Top 20 Music Videos chart upon release.

== Reception ==
Professional ratings
Review scores
Source	Rating
AllMusic	4/5 stars
The Boston Phoenix	2.5/4 stars
Encyclopedia of Popular Music	5/5 stars
Entertainment Weekly	B−
Los Angeles Times	2/4 stars
Q	2/5 stars
Rolling Stone	3/5 stars
The Rolling Stone Album Guide	2.5/5 stars
Spin	6/10
USA Today	2.5/4 stars

Stephen Thomas Erlewine of AllMusic stated: "Like a less mannered and conflicted Let Your Dim Light Shine-era Soul Asylum, the trio balances hard rockers with ballads. The difference is, they enjoy the mainstreaming of their music and respond with one of their catchiest sets of songs. There's nothing new on the record apart from their willingness to polish their music so it reaches the widest audience. That will alienate whatever hardcore followers they have left, but that attitude will likely please anyone brought aboard with 'Name' and 'Iris'."

== Track listing ==
All tracks are written by John Rzeznik, except where noted.

No.	Title	Writer(s)	Length
1.	"Dizzy"		2:43
2.	"Slide"		3:34
3.	"Broadway"		4:00
4.	"January Friend"	Robby Takac	2:46
5.	"Black Balloon"		4:11
6.	"Bullet Proof"		4:39
7.	"Amigone"	Takac	3:17
8.	"All Eyes on Me"	Music: Rzeznik; Lyrics: Goo Goo Dolls	3:59
9.	"Full Forever"	Takac	2:53
10.	"Acoustic #3"		1:58
11.	"Iris"		4:51
12.	"Extra Pale"	Takac	2:12
13.	"Hate This Place"		4:24

- In some countries the album was released with a bonus track, e.g. in Japan ("Iris" - Acoustic version) and in Germany ("Name").

== Personnel ==
Personnel taken from Dizzy Up the Girl CD booklet, except where noted.

Goo Goo Dolls

- John Rzeznik – vocals, guitars
- Robby Takac – vocals, bass guitar
- Mike Malinin – drums

Guest musicians

- David Campbell – string arrangements
- Tommy Keene
- Jamie Muhoberac – piano on "Iris"
- Benmont Tench
- Luis Conte
- Nathan December
- Tim Pierce – mandolin and slide guitar solo on "Iris"
- Rob Cavallo

Production

- Rob Cavallo – production
- Goo Goo Dolls – production
- Jack Joseph Puig – mixing
- Ken Allardyce – engineer
- Darrell Thorp – assistant engineer
- Greg Collins – assistant engineer
- Allen Sides – engineer on "Iris"
- Bob Ludwig – mastering
- Steve Gerdes – art direction, design
- Melanie Nissen – photography

== Charts ==
=== Weekly charts ===
Chart (1998–99)	Peak position
Australian Albums (ARIA)	17
Austrian Albums (Ö3 Austria)	20
Belgian Albums (Ultratop Flanders)	27
Canadian Albums (RPM)	4
Dutch Albums (Album Top 100)	38
German Albums (Offizielle Top 100)	30
New Zealand Albums (RMNZ)	19
Norwegian Albums (VG-lista)	35
Swedish Albums (Sverigetopplistan)	17
UK Albums (OCC)	47
US Billboard 200	15

Chart (2023)	Peak position
Hungarian Physical Albums (MAHASZ)	19

=== Year-end charts ===
Chart (1998)	Position
Canada Top Albums/CDs (RPM)	91
US Billboard 200	162
Chart (1999)	Position
Australian Albums (ARIA)	75
Canada Top Albums/CDs (RPM)	79
US Billboard 200	29
Chart (2000)	Position
US Billboard 200	121

== Certifications ==
Region	Certification	Certified units/sales
Australia (ARIA)	Platinum	70,000^{^}
Canada (Music Canada)	4× Platinum	400,000^{‡}
Denmark (IFPI Danmark)	Gold	10,000^{‡}
New Zealand (RMNZ)	2× Platinum	30,000^{‡}
United Kingdom (BPI)	Gold	100,000^{‡}
United States (RIAA)	5× Platinum	5,000,000^{‡}
^{^} Shipments figures based on certification alone.^{‡} Sales+streaming figures based on certification alone.
