= Here Is Gone =

2002 single by Goo Goo Dolls

Single by Goo Goo Dolls

from the album Gutterflower
- B-side: "Big Machine"
- Released: March 11, 2002
- Length: 3:58
- Label: Warner Bros.
- Songwriter: John Rzeznik
- Producers: Rob Cavallo, Goo Goo Dolls

Goo Goo Dolls singles chronology
| "Broadway" (2000) | "Here Is Gone" (2002) | "Big Machine" (2002) |

Music video
- "Here Is Gone" on YouTube

"Here Is Gone" is a song by American rock band Goo Goo Dolls. A song about yearning for a deeper relationship with someone, "Here Is Gone" was released on March 11, 2002, as the lead single from the band's seventh studio album, Gutterflower (2002). The song reached number 18 on the US Billboard Hot 100 chart and number three on the Billboard Adult Top 40 and Triple-A rankings. It also topped Canada's airplay chart and entered the top 20 in New Zealand and Poland.

== Writing and composition ==
Frontman John Rzeznik said the single is "kind of a cynical track about a very casual relationship where you just want something more." He explained that living 3,000 miles away from home while being single and "trying to figure things out is pretty much what was going on in this process."

== Music video ==
The video, directed by Francis Lawrence, portrays a somewhat vague story with multiple interpretations, from a literal visitation of spirits to figurative rebellion against fully "constructed" society. During a commentary the band did on the music video in 2008, bassist Robby Takac described what the video was to portray: "the idea was we were going to go through an entire day in a very short amount of time." The video shoot took place mostly in Lancaster, California.

== Track listings ==
US 7-inch single

A. "Here Is Gone" (album version) – 4:00
B. "Big Machine" (album version) – 3:10

UK CD1

1. "Here Is Gone" – 3:57
2. "We Are the Normal" – 3:56
3. "Burnin' Up" – 2:33
4. "Here Is Gone" (video) – 4:01

UK CD2

1. "Here Is Gone" – 3:57
2. "Two Days in February" – 3:12
3. "Girl Right Next to Me" – 3:43

European CD single

1. "Here Is Gone" – 3:57
2. "We Are the Normal" – 3:56

Australian CD single

1. "Here Is Gone" – 3:57
2. "We Are the Normal" – 3:36
3. "Burnin' Up" – 2:32
4. "Two Days in February" – 3:12

== Personnel ==
Personnel are taken from the UK CD1 liner notes.

- John Rzeznik – writing
- Rob Cavallo, Goo Goo Dolls – production
- Allen Sides, Ken Allardyce – engineering
- Tom Lord-Alge – mixing

== Charts ==
=== Weekly charts ===
Weekly chart performance for "Here Is Gone"
| Chart (2002) | Peak position |
|---|---|
| Australia (ARIA) | 40 |
| Canada Radio (Nielsen BDS) | 1 |
| Canada CHR (Nielsen BDS) | 4 |
| Europe (European Hit Radio) | 36 |
| New Zealand (Recorded Music NZ) | 17 |
| Poland (Nielsen Music Control) | 12 |
| Quebec Airplay (ADISQ) | 1 |
| UK Singles (OCC) | 100 |
| UK Rock & Metal (OCC) | 10 |
| US Billboard Hot 100 | 18 |
| US Adult Alternative Airplay (Billboard) | 3 |
| US Adult Pop Airplay (Billboard) | 3 |
| US Alternative Airplay (Billboard) | 21 |
| US Pop Airplay (Billboard) | 15 |
| US Mainstream Rock (Billboard) | 29 |

=== Year-end charts ===
Year-end chart performance for "Here Is Gone"
| Chart (2002) | Position |
|---|---|
| Canada Radio (Nielsen BDS) | 16 |
| US Billboard Hot 100 | 78 |
| US Adult Top 40 (Billboard) | 18 |
| US Mainstream Top 40 (Billboard) | 67 |
| US Modern Rock Tracks (Billboard) | 88 |
| US Triple-A (Billboard) | 14 |

== Certifications ==
Certifications and sales for "Here Is Gone"
| Region | Certification | Certified units/sales |
|---|---|---|
| United States (RIAA) | Gold | 500,000^{‡} |
^{‡} Sales+streaming figures based on certification alone.

== Release history ==
Release dates and formats for "Here Is Gone"
| Region | Date | Format(s) | Label(s) | Ref. |
|---|---|---|---|---|
| United States | March 11, 2002 | Radio | Warner Bros. | |
| Australia | April 22, 2002 | CD | Warner Bros. | |
| United Kingdom | July 8, 2002 | CD; cassette | Warner Bros. | |
