= Goo Goo Dolls =

American rock band

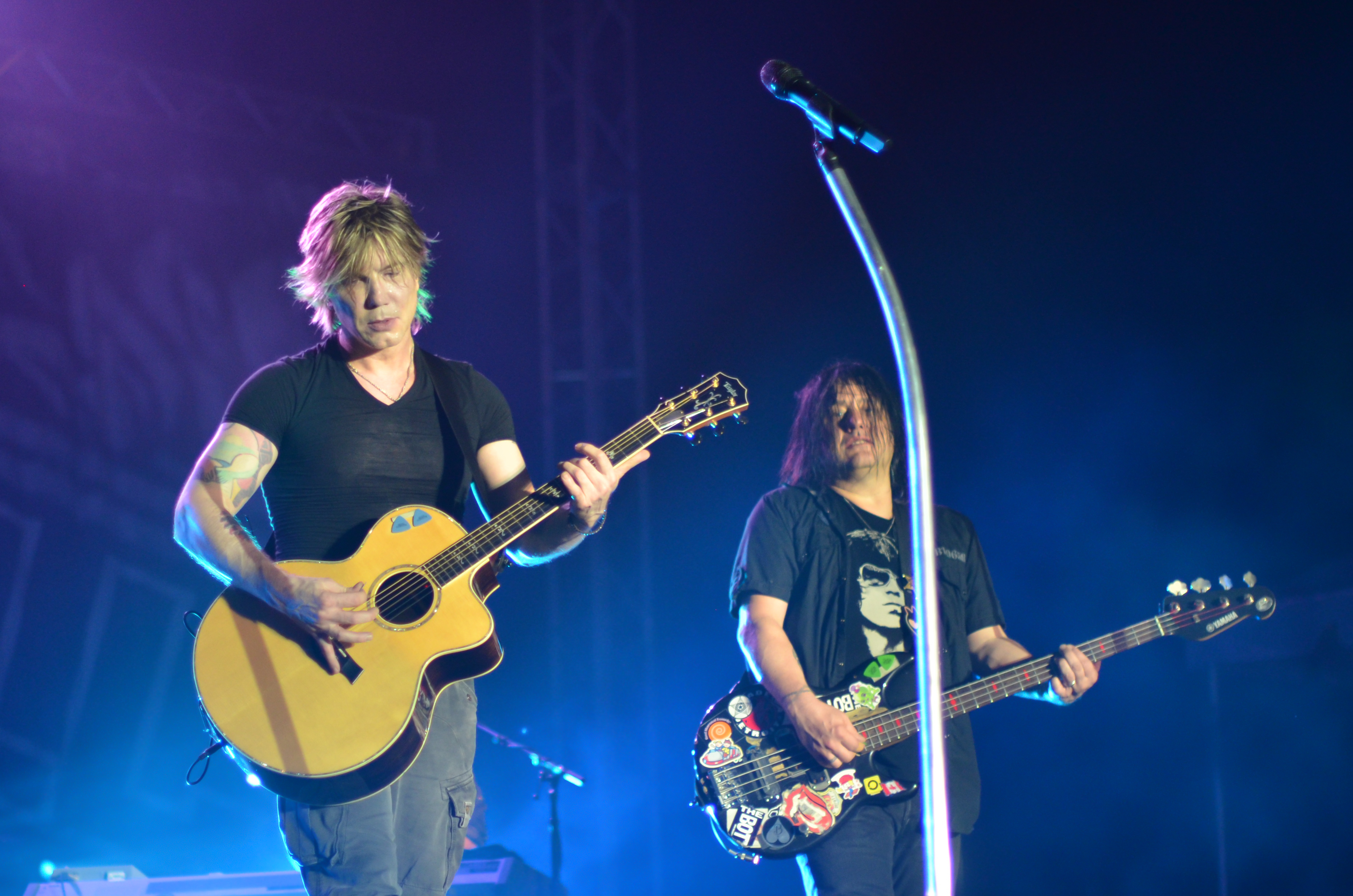
- John Rzeznik (left) and Robby Takac in 2013

Background information
- Also known as: Sex Maggots (1985–1986); The Goo Goo Dolls (1998–2007)
- Origin: Buffalo, New York, U.S.
- Genres: Rock; alternative rock; pop rock; power pop; soft rock; post-grunge; punk rock (early)
- Works: Discography
- Years active: 1985–present
- Labels: Warner; Metal Blade; Celluloid
- Members: John Rzeznik; Robby Takac
- Past members: George Tutuska; Mike Malinin
- Website: googoodolls.com

The Goo Goo Dolls are an American rock band based in Buffalo, New York, composed of lead vocalist and guitarist John Rzeznik, bassist and vocalist Robby Takac and several rotating members since its formation in 1985.

After starting off as a cover band and then developing a punk sound, Goo Goo Dolls experienced mainstream success following the 1995 release of their breakthrough single "Name.” Their 1998 single "Iris" spent 11 consecutive months on the Billboard Hot 100 and peaked atop the Hot 100 Airplay chart for 18 weeks. In October 2012, "Iris" placed first on Billboard's "Top 100 Pop Songs 1992–2012" chart. Other singles include "Slide", "Black Balloon", and "Broadway" from Dizzy Up the Girl (1998); "Here Is Gone" from Gutterflower (2002); and "Better Days", "Give a Little Bit", and "Stay with You" from Let Love In (2006).

The band has had seven top-40 singles on the Billboard Hot 100, which includes three top tens. They have sold 15 million records worldwide, and received four Grammy Award nominations.

== History ==
=== Origins and early music (1985–1993) ===
The band's original lineup included John Rzeznik (guitar, vocals), Robby Takac (bass, vocals), and George Tutuska (drums, percussion). Takac and Tutuska had been long-time friends in school and met Rzeznik while he was playing in the band The Beaumonts with Takac's cousin, Paul Takac, and close friend Michael Harvey who was the inspiration for the band. In 1999 Rolling Stone reported the trio picked their name from a True Detective ad for a toy called a Goo Goo Doll. In 2022, Rzeznik said he didn't remember how they picked the name. "We had a gig and so we had to come up with some kind of a name just to play the show", Rzeznik said. "It's kind of a stupid name."

The band started out playing covers, but went on to develop a punk sound. With Takac as their lead singer, the band released their first album, Goo Goo Dolls, in 1987 on Mercenary Records, but was picked up in 1988 by Celluloid Records, a larger record company. They played around Buffalo's underground music circuit and across the United States, opening for punk bands such as Gang Green, SNFU, Dag Nasty, Bad Religion, Motörhead, ALL, The Dead Milkmen, Doughboys, Big Drill Car, The Gun Club, Uniform Choice, The Dickies, Soulside, Necros, and DRI, and playing with fellow Buffalo bands. The band released its second album, Jed, in 1989.

The band released its third album, Hold Me Up, in 1990 and featured Rzeznik as the lead vocalist on five tracks, including the single "There You Are" and "Two Days in February". After being embraced by local college radio and punk scenes (including such venues as CBGB), the Goo Goo Dolls incorporated elements of heavy metal, pop rock, and punk rock into the album. In 1991, the song "I'm Awake Now" was recorded for the soundtrack of Freddy's Dead: The Final Nightmare.

Superstar Car Wash, released in 1993, received a larger budget from Metal Blade Records. The album was partially recorded at Metalworks Studios in Mississauga, Ontario. The single "We Are the Normal", co-written with Paul Westerberg of The Replacements, Westerberg providing the lyrics, received a major push toward play on college and independent radio, and its video was displayed on MTV's 120 Minutes program. "Fallin' Down" made it onto the 1993 soundtrack of Pauly Shore's hit film Son in Law.

=== Mainstream success, A Boy Named Goo, legal issues, and Tutuska's departure (1993–1997) ===
Just before A Boy Named Goo's release, Tutuska was fired from the band and replaced by Mike Malinin. Prior to Tutuska's departure, there was a payment dispute between him and Rzeznik over Tutuska's contribution to the writing of the Superstar Car Wash single "Fallin' Down". During the completion of A Boy Named Goo, Tutuska had told band management that he would not tour behind the album unless royalties were to be split evenly among the three members, a practice Tutuska said had been the band's standard practice ever since the release of its self-titled debut in 1987. Tutuska has said that when he told Rzeznik he had not received royalties from "Fallin' Down", Rzeznik admitted that he had been receiving such royalties for two years.

A Boy Named Goo became the first album in Metal Blade history to achieve double-platinum status. The single "Name" was particularly successful on the record. This success, however, proved bittersweet, as the band found themselves in a legal battle with Metal Blade. The band filed suit against Metal Blade, claiming they had not earned any royalties from their album's sales, which was attributed to a "grossly unfair, one-sided and unenforceable contract" which had been signed by the band in 1987. The two sides reached a settlement which had the band signed to Metal Blade's distributing label, Warner Bros. Records, under which the band released their sixth album Dizzy Up the Girl in 1998.

The Goo Goo Dolls experienced mainstream success following the 1995 release of their breakthrough single "Name". The success of "Name" marked a fundamental change in the band's sound from alternative rock to a more mainstream, adult-oriented direction and led to guest appearances on Beverly Hills, 90210 and Charmed.

=== Dizzy Up the Girl and Gutterflower (1997–2005) ===
Rzeznik was approached to write a song for the City of Angels soundtrack, and the end product was "Iris". Session guitarist Tim Pierce played the mandolin intro and also the slide guitar solo. The song stayed on top of Billboard Hot 100 Airplay charts for 18 weeks and spent 4 weeks at No. 1 on Billboard's Pop Songs chart. Iris held the record for the most weeks on the radio for almost 22 years before The Weeknd released "Blinding Lights" and broke the long-standing record on August 22, 2020. Iris was nominated for three Grammys. According to several interviews with Rzeznik, he was experiencing serious bouts of writer's block when he was approached, and was on the verge of quitting the band days before he wrote the song.

"Iris" was included on the quintuple-platinum Dizzy Up the Girl, and was among top-ten hits "Slide", "Black Balloon", "Broadway", and "Dizzy" from the same album. In 2001, the Goos released their first compilation CD, What I Learned About Ego, Opinion, Art & Commerce. Next, Gutterflower (2002) achieved gold certification, producing the hits "Here Is Gone", "Sympathy", and "Big Machine". On July 4, 2004, the band performed a free concert in Buffalo, playing through a deluge of rain that appears on the DVD released later that year. The DVD also contained a studio version of the Goo Goo Dolls' cover of "Give a Little Bit" by Supertramp. The single reached the top of the Adult Top 40 chart in 2005. July 4, 2004, has been proclaimed "Goo Goo Dolls Day" in their native Buffalo, New York.

=== Let Love In (2005–2007) ===
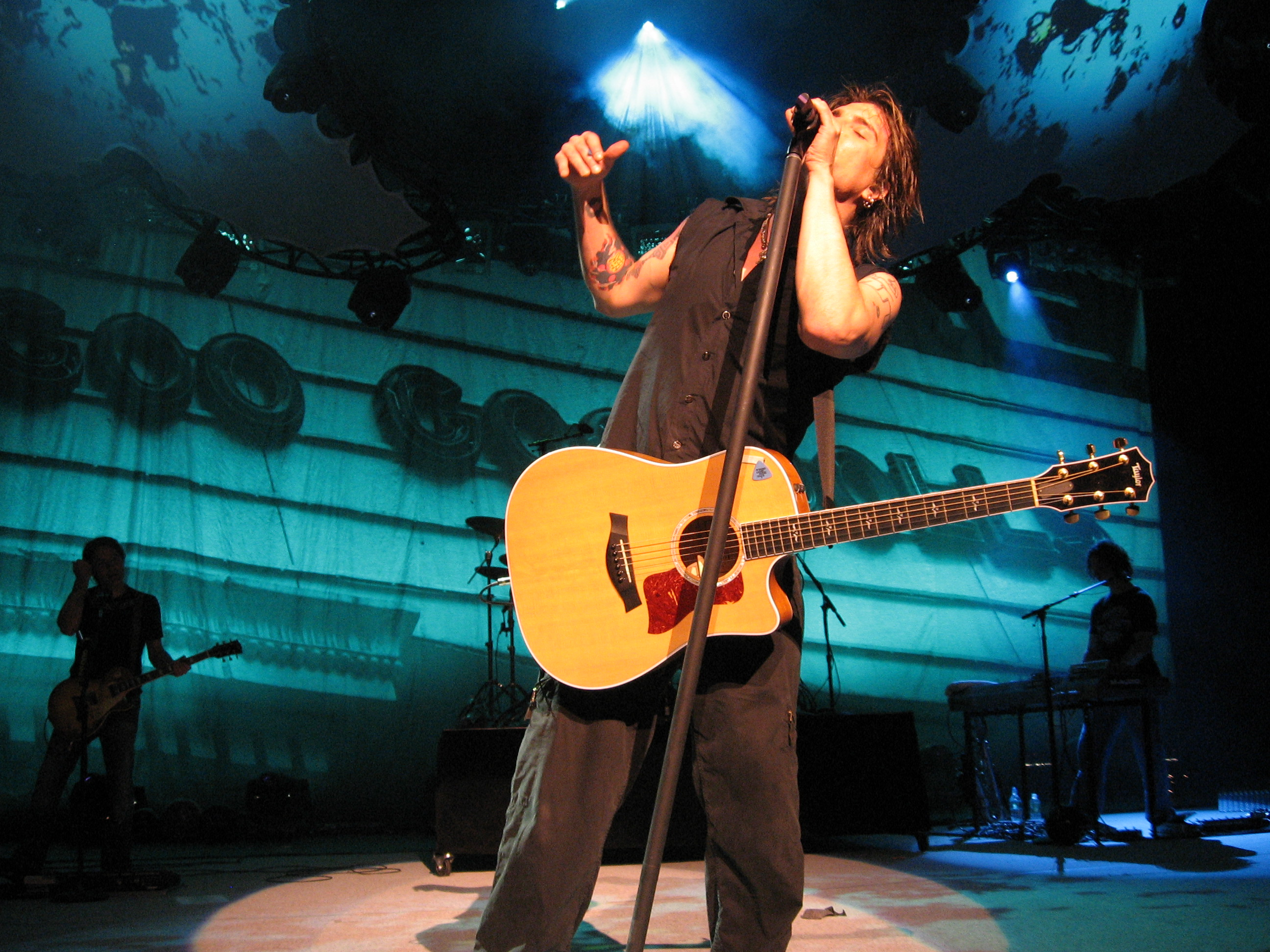
Goo Goo Dolls perform their song "Before It's Too Late" from the OST of the 2007 film Transformers at the Tweeter Center in Mansfield, Massachusetts, on July 22, 2007.

In 2006, the Goo Goo Dolls marked their 20th anniversary with their new album Let Love In, which included the studio recording of "Give a Little Bit" as well as other top 10 radio singles "Better Days", "Stay with You", and "Let Love In". Goo Goo Dolls performed on The Tonight Show with Jay Leno on June 8, 2007, and at The Late Late Show with Craig Ferguson on June 22, 2007.

On June 27, 2007, the Goo Goo Dolls performed at Red Rocks Amphitheatre in Morrison, Colorado. The concert was released as a DVD on the limited-edition version of their 2008 release, Vol.2. Though the album has not (as of 2007) been certified by the Recording Industry Association of America (RIAA), various music sites have asserted that it has gone gold.

=== Greatest hits albums (2007–2008) ===
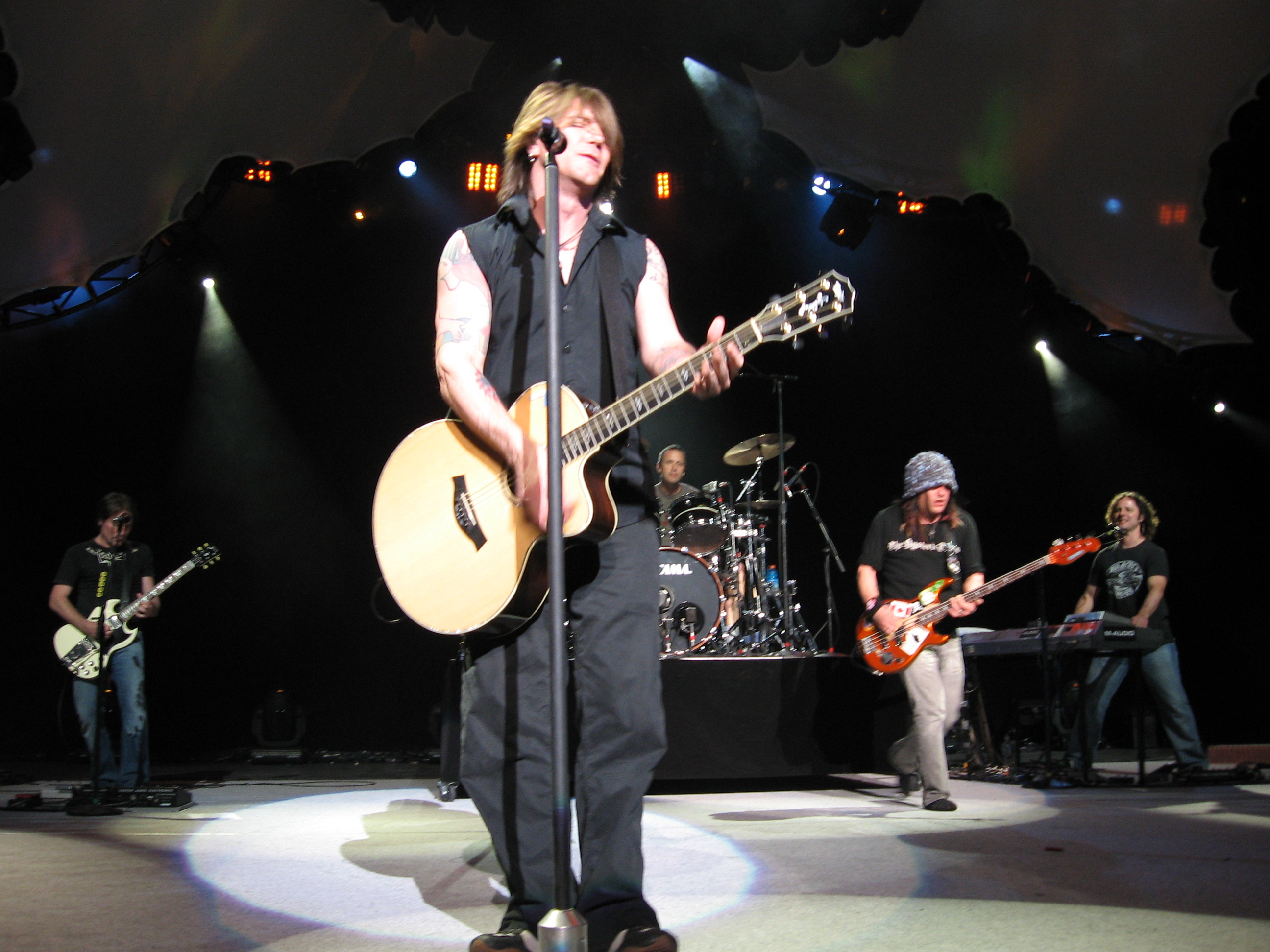
The band performing "Slide" in 2007

On November 13, 2007, the Goo Goo Dolls released a greatest hits album entitled Greatest Hits Volume One: The Singles, which includes a new version of "Name" recorded and mixed by Paul David Hager, and a remix of "Feel the Silence" by Michael Brauer.

The band performed "Better Days" and "Stay With You" at the halftime of the Detroit Lions' 2007 Thanksgiving Day game at Ford Field.

=== Something for the Rest of Us (2008–2010) ===
The Goo Goo Dolls announced recording sessions for a new album, on their website, unrelated to their Volume Two in 2008. In addition, the band performed as part of the O2 Wireless Festival in London's Hyde Park in the summer of 2008.

Something for the Rest of Us was released on August 31, 2010. While the album was full of the pop-rock that has sustained the band for decades, lead singer/guitarist Rzeznik's songwriting took on a more somber, serious tone. Something for the Rest of Us included the single "Home", which extended the band's record to 14 top ten hits at the Hot AC radio format (more than any other artist in the history of that format).

The band performed a live mini-concert at the Apple Store in Manhattan, New York on December 2, 2010.

=== Magnetic and Malinin's departure (2010–2015) ===
The album Magnetic was released on June 11, 2013 and debuted at No. 8 on the Billboard 200 chart. On July 19, 2013, the band released the second single off of Magnetic, "Come to Me".

In December 2013, Mike Malinin announced his departure from the band. In November 2014, Malinin sued the band for wrongful termination, claiming that he was fired after requesting paternity leave.

The Goo Goo Dolls contributed to the soundtrack of the broadway musical Finding Neverland in 2015. The soundtrack, released June 9, 2015, contained the song "If the World Turned Upside Down".

=== Boxes, 20th anniversary of A Boy Named Goo and touring (2015–2017) ===
The band spent the majority of 2015 in the studio writing and recording their eleventh studio album, Boxes, at Bear Creek Studio in Woodinville, Washington. The album was released on May 6, 2016.

The Goo Goo Dolls celebrated the 20th anniversary of the release of A Boy Named Goo by releasing a special edition of the album on November 27, 2015.

Goo Goo Dolls released an exclusive vinyl box set for Record Store Day on April 22, 2017, entitled Pick Pockets, Petty Thieves, and Tiny Victories (1987–1995).

=== You Should Be Happy, Miracle Pill, and Christmas album (2017–2021) ===
On May 12, 2017, Goo Goo Dolls released a five-song EP entitled You Should Be Happy. In support of the EP, the band toured throughout the summer of 2017 on the "Long Way Home" tour with Phillip Phillips. With 2018 marking the 20th anniversary of Dizzy Up the Girl, the band embarked on a commemorative tour where they performed the album in its entirety. Also in 2018, the band released two live albums: The Audience is This Way in June, and The Audience is That Way in November.

At the beginning of 2019, the Goo Goo Dolls announced that they were working on a twelfth studio album. On record store day (April 13, 2019), a vinyl box limited to 1000 copies under the name Topography was released.

On August 24, 2020, the band announced a Christmas album: It's Christmas All Over, which was released on October 30. Later that year, Rzeznik sat down with Atwood Magazine to discuss the band's 35th anniversary.

In May 2021, the band announced that Rarities, a double compilation featuring songs spanning from 1995 to 2007, would be released on June 25, 2021.

=== Chaos in Bloom (2022–present) ===
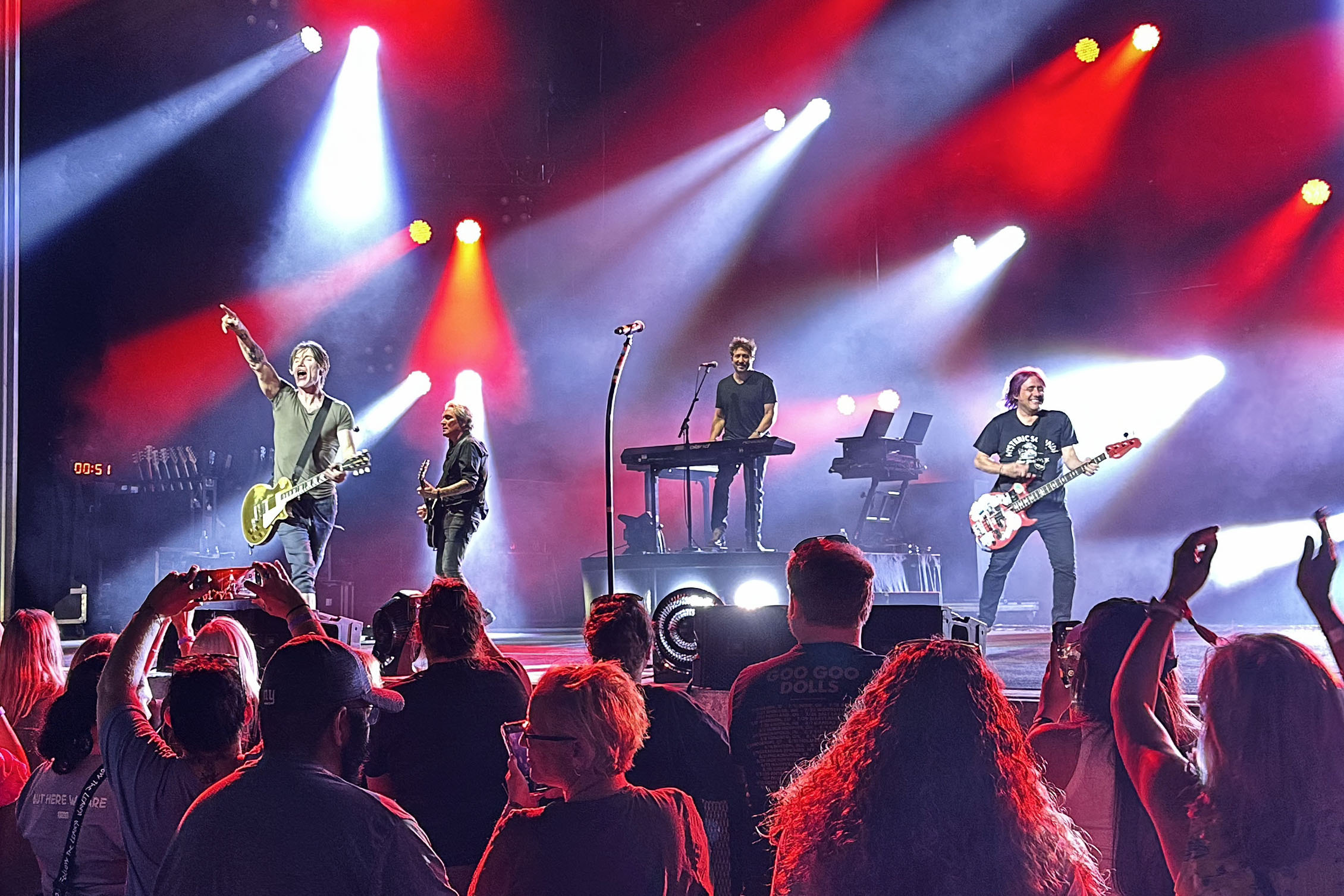
Goo Goo Dolls performing in Syracuse, New York in 2023

Goo Goo Dolls performing in Asbury Park, New Jersey in 2026 at the Sea.Hear.Now Festival

In a June 2021 interview, singer John Rzeznik revealed that the band was working on their 14th studio album, which would be released sometime in 2022. When asked about how the album differs from the band's previous work, Rzeznik claimed that the band had decided to approach both writing and recording in an alternative way. Specifically, the band used earlier forms of production which they utilized prior to the digital era in the music industry.

In a November 2021 Spin interview, Rzeznik stated that he produced most of the album himself. He added that the album would sound more experimental than the band's past releases, hinting that he did not believe it would receive much radio airplay. It was later confirmed that the album was entirely produced by Rzeznik.

On June 27, 2022, the band announced the title of their new album, Chaos in Bloom, as well as the first single off it, "Yeah, I Like You". The latter premiered on July 1, 2022.

In February 2023, Goo Goo Dolls announced their North America tour. In December 2025, the band announced a tour to celebrate the 40th anniversary of their formation.

== Band members ==
- John Rzeznik – guitar (1985–present), lead vocals (1990–present; occasional 1985–1990), backing vocals (1985–1990; occasional 1990–present), keyboards (2008–2013)
- Robby Takac – bass (1985–present), backing vocals (1990–present; occasional 1985–1990), lead vocals (1985–1990; occasional 1990–present)

Touring musicians

- Craig Macintyre – drums, percussion (2014–present)
- Jim McGorman – keyboards, guitar, backing vocals (2018–present)
- Sammy Boller — guitar, mandolin, backing vocals (2025–present)

Former members

- George Tutuska – drums, percussion (1985–1995), backing and occasional lead vocals (1990)
- Mike Malinin – drums, percussion (1995–2013); backing vocals (2012–2013)

Former touring musicians

- Brad Fernquist – guitar, mandolin, backing vocals (2006–2025)
- Lance Diamond – guest vocals (1986–2014; died 2015)
- Nathan December – guitar, mandolin, backing vocals (1998–2000)
- Dave Schulz – keyboards, backing vocals (1998–2000)
- Jason Freese – keyboards, accordion, saxophone, backing vocals (2001–2004)
- Greg Suran – guitar, mandolin, percussion, backing vocals (2002–2006)
- Paul Gordon – keyboards, backing vocals (2004–2006; died 2016)
- Korel Tunador – keyboards, guitar, saxophone, backing vocals (2006–2009, 2009–2018)
- Scott Eric Olivier – keyboards, guitar, backing vocals (2009)
- Rick Woolstenhulme Jr. – drums, percussion (2013–2014)

== Discography ==
Studio albums

- Goo Goo Dolls (1987)
- Jed (1989)
- Hold Me Up (1990)
- Superstar Car Wash (1993)
- A Boy Named Goo (1995)
- Dizzy Up the Girl (1998)
- Gutterflower (2002)
- Let Love In (2006)
- Something for the Rest of Us (2010)
- Magnetic (2013)
- Boxes (2016)
- Miracle Pill (2019)
- Chaos in Bloom (2022)

== Awards and nominations ==
At the 41st Grammy Awards, "Iris" received nominations for "Record of the Year" and "Pop Performance by a Duo or Group". The song also garnered John Rzeznik a "Song of the Year" nomination. The song was ranked at number 39 on Rolling Stone's list of the 100 greatest pop songs.

=== Billboard Music Awards ===
Year	Nominee / work	Award	Result
1995	"Name"	Top Modern Rock Track	Nominated
1998	"Iris"	Top Hot 100 Airplay Track	Nominated
1998	"Iris"	Top Adult Top 40 Track	Nominated
1998	Themselves	Top Adult Top 40 Artist	Nominated
1999	Themselves	Top Adult Top 40 Artist	Won
1999	Themselves	Top Hot Top 40 Artist	Won
1999	Themselves	Top Hot 100 Singles Artist	Nominated
1999	Themselves	Top Hot 100 Singles Artist – Duo/Group	Nominated
1999	"Slide"	Top Hot 100 Airplay Track	Nominated
1999	"Slide"	Top Hot Top 40 Track	Won
1999	"Slide"	Top Adult Top 40 Track	Won

=== Other awards ===
Year	Awards	Work	Category	Result	Ref.
1998	Grammy Awards	"Iris"	Song of the Year (John Rzeznik)	Nominated	
1998	Grammy Awards	"Iris"	Record of the Year	Nominated	
1998	Grammy Awards	"Iris"	Best Pop Performance by a Duo or Group with Vocals	Nominated	
1998	MTV Video Music Awards	"Iris"	Best Video from a Film	Nominated	
1998	Billboard Music Video Awards	"Iris"	Pop Clip of the Year	Nominated	
1999	MTV Movie Awards	"Iris"	Best Song from a Movie	Nominated	
1999	Radio Music Awards	"Iris"	Song of the Year – Adult Hit Radio	Won	
1999	Online Music Awards	Themselves	Favorite Rock Group	Nominated	
1999	Teen Choice Awards	Themselves	Choice Music Group	Nominated	
2000	Teen Choice Awards	Themselves	Choice Music: Rock Group	Nominated	
2000	Radio Music Awards	Themselves	Artist of the Year – Alternative/Pop Radio	Won	
2000	ASCAP Pop Awards	"Slide"	Song of the Year	Won	
2000	Grammy Awards	"Black Balloon"	Best Rock Performance by a Duo or Group with Vocals	Nominated	
2001	BMI Pop Awards	"Broadway"	Award-Winning Song	Won	
2001	ASCAP Pop Awards	"Black Balloon"	Most Performed Songs	Won	
2001	ASCAP Pop Awards	"Slide"	Most Performed Songs	Won	
2003	ASCAP Pop Awards	"Here Is Gone"	Most Performed Songs	Won	
2005	Radio Music Awards	Themselves	Artist of the Year – Adult Hit Radio	Won	
2005	Radio Music Awards	"Give a Little Bit"	Song of the Year – Adult Hit Radio	Nominated	
2007	ASCAP Pop Awards	"Better Days"	Most Performed Song	Won	
2008	The Average Lives of Students Music Awards	Themselves	Excellence Award	Won	
2008	Songwriters Hall of Fame	John Rzeznik	Hal David Starlight Award	Won	
2013	Guitar Center RockWalk Hall of Fame	Themselves	RockWalk Hall of Fame	Won	
2026	American Music Awards	"Iris"	Best Throwback Song	Nominated	
