= Slide (Goo Goo Dolls song) =

1998 single by Goo Goo Dolls

Single by Goo Goo Dolls

from the album Dizzy Up the Girl
- B-side: "Acoustic #3"; "Nothing Can Change You"
- Released: September 17, 1998
- Genre: Jangle pop; alternative rock
- Length: 3:32
- Label: Warner Bros.
- Songwriter: John Rzeznik
- Producers: Rob Cavallo; Goo Goo Dolls

Goo Goo Dolls singles chronology
"Iris" (1998)	"Slide" (1998)	"Dizzy" (1999)

Music video
- "Slide" on YouTube

"Slide" is a song by American alternative rock group Goo Goo Dolls. It was released as the first single from their sixth studio album, Dizzy Up the Girl, in September 1998. According to lead guitarist John Rzeznik, the song is about a Catholic girl who becomes pregnant and discusses with her boyfriend how they should respond to it. Musically, the track is a jangle pop and alternative rock song.

"Slide" reached number one on the US Billboard Adult Top 40, Modern Rock Tracks, Mainstream Top 40, and Triple-A charts. On the Billboard Hot 100, the song peaked at number eight in February 1999. In Canada, the song debuted atop the RPM 100 Hit Tracks chart on October 19, 1998, becoming the band's second number-one single on that chart. Worldwide, "Slide" entered the top 40 in Australia, Iceland, and New Zealand, as well as on Spanish radio.

== Meaning and composition ==
In a 2002 performance on VH1 Storytellers, John Rzeznik explained that the song refers to a teenage girl in a strict Catholic environment who has become pregnant. She and her boyfriend are debating as to the possibility of abortion or marriage, which is presented in the song as the verse "do you want to get married or run away". A jangle pop and alternative rock song, "Slide" is written in common time (4/4) with a key of A♭ major.

Rzeznik elaborated on the song's meaning and context in a 2018 interview with Stereogum: "That song is very much East Side Story kind of thing. When I say East Side Story, I just mean I grew up on the east side of Buffalo. That was a not-so-apocryphal tale about some hard choices and dealing with a very rigid culture with a lot of demands put on the people who are part of that community, whether it was religious pressure, family pressure. It was really interesting to me to examine all those things. Everybody was a democrat where we grew up. It was a blue-collar town and the democrats represented the working class and the unions. But very, very super-conservative Catholic, very proud immigrant community, very stoic."

== Chart performance ==
"Slide" topped four US Billboard charts: the Adult Top 40, the Modern Rock Tracks chart, the Mainstream Top 40, and the Triple-A ranking. On the all-genre Billboard Hot 100, the song peaked at number eight in February 1999, giving Goo Goo Dolls their third top-10 hit on this chart, and became the United States' 13th-most-successful song of 1999. In October 2012, "Slide" was ranked number nine on Billboard's "Top 100 Pop Songs 1992–2012" chart, which also featured two other Goo Goo Dolls hits: "Iris" (number one) and "Name" (number 24). The Goo Goo Dolls are the only musicians to have three songs chart on the list, two breaking the top 10 and all three falling within the top 25. They are also the only musicians that have back-to-back singles ("Iris" and "Slide") featured on the list. The Recording Industry Association of America (RIAA) awarded the song a triple-platinum certification in September 2023.

In Canada, the song accomplished a rare feat by debuting at number one on the RPM 100 Hit Tracks chart, on October 19, 1998. Not counting the number-one song on the magazine's first issue, it became only the third (and final) song to debut at number one on this chart, after Band Aid's "Do They Know It's Christmas?" in 1985 and Tom Cochrane's "I Wish You Well" in 1995. After its debut, "Slide" spent a second week at number one, then dropped to number four on November 2. It spent a total of 26 weeks in the top 20 and remained in the top 100 until the end of 1999. The song also reached number 22 on the RPM Adult Contemporary Tracks chart and number five on the Alternative 30. It was the 18th-most-successful single of Canada in 1999. In 2025, Music Canada certified the song triple platinum, for sales and streaming figures exceeding 240,000 units.

Outside North America, "Slide" underperformed in most countries. It debuted at number 45 on the Australian Singles Chart on January 17, 1999, then slowly climbed up the chart until reaching its peak of number 29 on March 7. Afterwards, it dropped out of the top 30 and left the chart five weeks after peaking. Despite its low peak, it earned a gold certification for sales exceeding 35,000 copies. In neighboring New Zealand, the single first appeared at number 41 on February 21 and peaked at number 36 the following week, then spent three more weeks in the top 50. Recorded Music NZ (RMNZ) awarded the song a platinum certification in 2022 for sales and streaming figures exceeding 30,000 units. On the UK Singles Chart, "Slide" debuted and peaked at number 43 on March 27, but spent only one more week on the chart before dropping out of the top 100. On the UK Indie Chart, which ranks songs released by independent record labels, it reached number eight. The song has sold and streamed over 200,000 units in the UK, allowing it to be certified silver by the British Phonographic Industry (BPI). "Slide" attained its highest European peak in Iceland, where it charted at number 14 for two weeks.

== Music video ==
The music video was directed by Nancy Bardawil and partially filmed at the El Dorado Hotel on South Spring Street, Los Angeles.

== Track listings ==
UK and Japanese CD single

1. "Slide" (album version) – 3:33
2. "Acoustic #3" – 1:57
3. "Nothing Can Change You" – 3:14

European CD single

1. "Slide" (album version) – 3:33
2. "Acoustic #3" – 1:57

Australian maxi-CD single

1. "Slide"
2. "Nothing Can Change You"
3. "Acoustic #3"

== Charts ==
=== Weekly charts ===
Chart (1998–1999)	Peak position
Australia (ARIA)	29
Canada Top Singles (RPM)	1
Canada Adult Contemporary (RPM)	22
Canada Rock/Alternative (RPM)	5
European Radio Top 50 (Music & Media)	39
Iceland (Íslenski Listinn Topp 40)	14
New Zealand (Recorded Music NZ)	36
Scottish Singles Sales (Official Charts)	44
Spain (Top 40 Radio)	28
UK Singles (Official Charts)	43
UK Airplay (Music Week)	47
UK Indie (Official Charts)	8
US Billboard Hot 100	8
US Adult Alternative Airplay (Billboard)	1
US Adult Pop Airplay (Billboard)	1
US Alternative Airplay (Billboard)	1
US Mainstream Rock (Billboard)	4
US Pop Airplay (Billboard)	1

Chart (2013)	Peak position
US Rock Digital Songs (Billboard)	36

=== Year-end charts ===
Chart (1998)	Position
Canada Top Singles (RPM)	97
Canada Rock/Alternative (RPM)	50
US Adult Top 40 (Billboard)	76
US Mainstream Rock Tracks (Billboard)	59
US Modern Rock Tracks (Billboard)	42

Chart (1999)	Position
Canada Top Singles (RPM)	18
US Billboard Hot 100	13
US Adult Top 40 (Billboard)	1
US Mainstream Rock Tracks (Billboard)	23
US Mainstream Top 40 (Billboard)	1
US Modern Rock Tracks (Billboard)	23
US Top 40 Tracks (Billboard)	1
US Triple-A (Billboard)	2

== Certifications ==
Region	Certification	Certified units/sales
Australia (ARIA)	Gold	35,000^{^}
Canada (Music Canada)	3× Platinum	240,000^{‡}
New Zealand (RMNZ)	2× Platinum	60,000^{‡}
United Kingdom (BPI)	Silver	200,000^{‡}
United States (RIAA)	3× Platinum	3,000,000^{‡}
^{^} Shipments figures based on certification alone.^{‡} Sales+streaming figures based on certification alone.

== Release history ==
Region	Date	Format(s)	Label(s)	Ref.
United States	September 17, 1998	Radio	Warner Bros.	
Australia	1998	CD	Third Rail	
Japan	November 15, 1998	CD	WEA Japan	
United Kingdom	March 15, 1999	CD; cassette	Edel; Hollywood; Third Rail	
