= Shonen Knife discography =

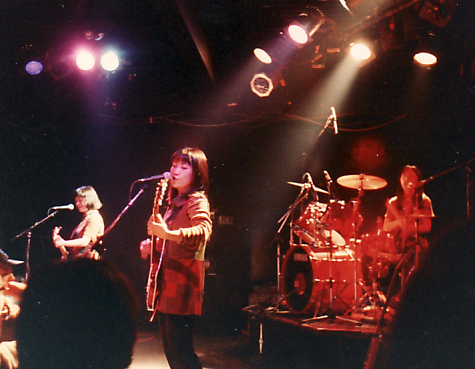
- The original lineup of Shonen Knife performing in Vancouver, Canada in the 1980s.
- Studio albums: 22
- Extended plays: 8
- Live albums: 6
- Compilation albums: 7
- Singles: 18

This is the comprehensive listing of releases by Japanese pop-punk band Shonen Knife.

== Albums ==
=== Studio albums ===
Year	Album details
1982	Minna Tanoshiku: Release date: August 15, 1982; Label: Independent; Format: Cassette
1983	Burning Farm: Release date: July 21, 1983; US re-release date: June 1985; Label: Zero Records/K Records; Format: LP/CD
1984	Yama-no Attchan: Release date: May 25, 1984; Label: Zero; Format: LP/CD
1986	Pretty Little Baka Guy: Release date: June 20, 1986; Re-release date: September 25, 1991; Label: Zero/Tokuma Japan; Format: LP/CD
1991	712: Release date: July 1, 1991; US re-release date: August 1991; Label: Nippon Crown/Gasatanka/Rockville; Format: CD
1992	Let's Knife: Release date: August 29, 1992; US release date: January 26, 1993; Label: MCA Victor/Capitol; Format: CD
1993	Rock Animals: Release date: September 8, 1993; UK release date: January 10, 1994; US release date: January 25, 1994; Label: MCA Victor/Creation-August/Virgin; Format: CD
1996	Brand New Knife: Release date: August 21, 1996; US release date: March 13, 1997; Label: MCA Victor/Big Deal; Format: CD
1998	Happy Hour: Release date: June 24, 1998; Label: Big Deal; Format: CD/cassette
2000	Strawberry Sound: Release date: February 20, 2000; Label: Universal/MCA; Format: CD
2002	Heavy Songs: Release date: February 2002; Label: Confidential; Format: CD
2003	Candy Rock: Release date: May 22, 2003; Label: Warner Indies Network; Format: CD
2005	Genki Shock!: Release date: June 3, 2005; US release date: Apr 11, 2006; Label: Glue Factory; Format: CD
2007	Fun! Fun! Fun!: Release date: July 6, 2007; Label: Blues Interactions; Format: CD
2007	Super Group: Release date: August 11, 2007; Label: P-Vine, Damnably, Good Charamel; Format: CD
2010	Free Time: Release date: January 2010; Label: P-Vine, Damnably, Good Charamel; Format: CD
2011	Osaka Ramones: Release date: July 19, 2011; Label: P-Vine, Damnably, Good Charamel; Format: CD
2012	Pop Tune: Release date: June 6, 2012; Label: P-Vine, Damnably, Good Charamel; Format: CD
2014	Overdrive: Release date: April 14, 2014; Label: P-Vine, Damnably, Good Charamel, Valve; Format: CD
2016	Adventure: Release date: April 1, 2016; Label: P-Vine, Damnably, Good Charamel, Valve; Format: CD
2019	Sweet Candy Power: Release date: June 5, 2019; Label: Good Charamel; Format: CD
2023	Our Best Place: Release date: February 15, 2023; Label: Good Charamel, P-Vine; Format: CD, digital streaming, digital download

=== Live albums ===
- (1991) We Are Very Happy You Came – live mini-album
- (2001) Power of Money – Burning Farm: BF-2CT) – rare cassette only album with Mana Nishiura
- (2006) Live in Osaka – The first completely live album by Shonen Knife
- (2010) "Live at Mohawk Place DVD" – Recorded live in Buffalo, NY on their North American "SuperGroup" Tour 2009
- (2015) Osaka Ramones Live – Naoko/Ritsuke/Emi with special guest CJ Ramone – produced by Good Charamel Records and TOMATO HEAD – Recorded live at The Bellhouse, Brooklyn, NY 18-Nov-2011 – limited 500 CD pressing
- (2018) Alive! In Osaka – recorded live at Juso Fandango in Osaka, Japan in December 2017, 21 tracks. DVD/CD package.

=== Compilations ===
- (1990) Shonen Knife – Compilation of first two albums
- (1995) Greatest History – Compilation only available in Japan
- (1996) The Birds & The B-Sides – collection of B-sides and outtakes
- (2000) Millennium Edition – compilation of material from 1996 to 1999 plus three unreleased versions of songs from Strawberry Sound
- (2006) Universal Hits-Golden Best – Two-disc compilation

=== Remix albums ===
- (1997) Super Mix – compilation of remixes
- (1999) Ultra Mix – compilation of remixes

=== Other ===
- (1987) Flipside Vinyl Fanzine vol. 3 – punk compilation features the song Cycling is Fun
- (1990) Rutles Highway Revisited – (tribute album to The Rutles) – features studio cover version of "Goose Step Mama"
- (1994) If I Were a Carpenter – tribute album to The Carpenters featured a cover of Top of the World
- (1997) Mint Sound Greatest Hits Volume One – compilation features the song Flying Jelly Attack
- (2000) The Powerpuff Girls Heroes and Villains – contributed the song Buttercup (I'm a Super Girl)
- (2011) Take It or Leave It – A Tribute to the Queens of Noise: The Runaways – compilation features cover of "Black Leather"
- (2013) Yellow Loveless – cover of "When You Sleep" on tribute album to My Bloody Valentine's Loveless.

== EPs ==
Year	EP details
1992	Riding on the Rocket: Release date: 1992; Label: August Records – CAUG 001 T; Format: Vinyl
1992	712 (EP): Release date: May, 1992; Label: Insipid Vinyl; Format: Vinyl
1992	Do the Knife: Release date: December 2, 1992; Label: MCA Victor; Format: CD
1994	Favorites: Release date: March 2, 1994; Label: MCA Victor; Format: CD
1994	Knife Collectors: Release date: May 31, 1994; Reissue: April 12, 1996; Label: Virgin/Fanclub; Format: CD
1997	It's a New Find: Release date: April 23, 1997; Label: MCA Victor; Format: CD
1997	Explosion!: Release date: September 9, 1997; Label: Big Deal; Format: CD

== Singles ==
Year	Title	Album
1991	"Neon Zebra"	712
1991	"Space Christmas"	Do the Knife
1991	"A Shonen Knife Christmas Record for You"	non-album single
1992	"Riding on the Rocket"	Let's Knife
1993	"Get the Wow"	Let's Knife
1993	"Concrete Animals"	Rock Animals
1993	"Brown Mushrooms"	Rock Animals
1994	"Tomato Head"	Rock Animals
1996	"Wonder Wine"	Brand New Knife
1996	"E.S.P."	Brand New Knife
1998	"Banana Chips"	Happy Hour
1999	"All I Want for Christmas"	non-album singles
1999	"Yamucharou Hamigaki"	non-album singles
2001	"Orange Sun"	non-album singles
2011	"Sweet Christmas" – b/w "We Wish You a Merry Christmas"	non-album singles
2012	"Pop Tune"	Pop Tune
2016	"Jump Into the New World"	Adventure
2019	"Sweet Candy Power"	Sweet Candy Power
