= Minna Tanoshiku =

Studio album by Shonen Knife
- Released: 1982
- Studio: Studio One and Yamaro Club
- Genre: Pop punk, post punk, indie rock
- Producer: XA Record

Shonen Knife chronology
Minna Tanoshiku (1982)	Burning Farm (1983)

Minna Tanoshiku or Everybody Happy is the first release by the Japanese rock band Shonen Knife. It was released in cassette-format only in 1982 in the band's native Japan. The first 50 copies were released by the band themselves, and the insert features the lip prints of the three band members, although Michie Nakatani once said that the lip print was by her grandmother. An additional 20 copies, without the lip inserts, were pressed by Zero Records before the band requested that further pressings be ceased.

The album was never reissued in any format and over the years it has become legendary among Shonen Knife fans due to its rarity and obscurity. Especially of interest were the unreleased songs, "Saboten" (a.k.a. "Cactus"- a cover of Delta 5's "You" with new lyrics), and "Planet X". Both songs are sung by bassist Michie Nakatani. The album also features embryonic versions of songs which would later feature on Burning Farm, Yama-no Attchan, and Pretty Little Baka Guy, and two live tracks, Nakatani's "An Angel Has Come" and "Spider" sung by Naoko Yamano to the tune of Édith Piaf's "Milord", which was later released (along with other live tracks from the same performance) on a US reissue of Pretty Little Baka Guy.

Due to the limited number of pressings, copies of this album are extremely rare. Digital versions of the recordings only appeared in fan trading circles in the spring of 2007, when the songs were made available in mp3 format on an internet blog.

A vinyl re-release of this album was issued by Pi-Vine records in July 2025.

== Track listing ==
1. "Banana Leaf"
2. "Parrot Polynesia"
3. "Cannibal Papaya"
4. "Saboten"
5. "Burning Farm"
6. "Parallel Woman"
7. "An Angel Has Come" (recorded live at Bahama in Osaka, Japan)
8. "Spider" (recorded live at Mantohihi in Osaka, Japan, 17 April 1982)
9. "I Am a Realist"
10. "Voice of Crane - Tortoise Brand Pot Cleaner's Theme"
11. "Planet X"
12. "Summertime Boogie"
13. "Miracles"

== Personnel ==
- Naoko Yamano - guitar, vocals
- Michie Nakatani - bass, keyboards, vocals
- Atsuko Yamano - drums, backing vocals
