= Overdrive (Shonen Knife album) =

Studio album by Shonen Knife
- Released: April 14, 2014 (UK/Europe)
- Genre: Pop punk; hard rock
- Length: 39:18
- Label: Good Charamel; P-Vine; Damnably; Valve
- Producer: Naoko Yamano & Atushi Shibata

Shonen Knife chronology
Pop Tune (2012)	Overdrive (2014)	Adventure (2016)

Overdrive is the 19th studio album by Japanese pop punk trio Shonen Knife. It was released on April 14, 2014 in Europe, and on April 16, 2014 in Japan. According to band leader Naoko Yamano, because their album Free Time (2010) was heavily influenced by punk rock, and Pop Tune (2012) had explored a more pop-oriented sound, Overdrive was a chance for the band to explore a more hard rock sound. The album's lyrics cover a wide array of topics, from green tea, fortune cookies, and cats.

The CD album artwork was created by Masahiko Ohno; three different color variations were released, with each corresponding to either Japan, North America, or Europe. The album received moderately positive reviews from critics, with many applauding the band's dabbling in harder rock, whereas others were critical of its musical and lyrical simplicity.

== Production ==
While Shonen Knife's usual sound is Ramones-inspired pop punk, the band branched out musically and listened to harder rock bands for Overdrive, such as such as Bad Company, Black Sabbath, Boston, Deep Purple, The Doobie Brothers, Judas Priest, Thin Lizzy, and ZZ Top—for inspiration. IAmTunedUp.com described the album's sound as a combination of "edgy guitar riffs with psychedelic 70s-esque enchanting nostalgia". Naoko Yamano reasoned that because Free Time (2010) was heavily influenced by punk rock, and Pop Tune (2012) explored a more pop-oriented sound, Overdrive represented an opportunity for the band to explore harder rock. Because of the band's exploration, the album's name references the overdrive pedal, which, in Yamano's mind, conjured up images of 1970s rock music.

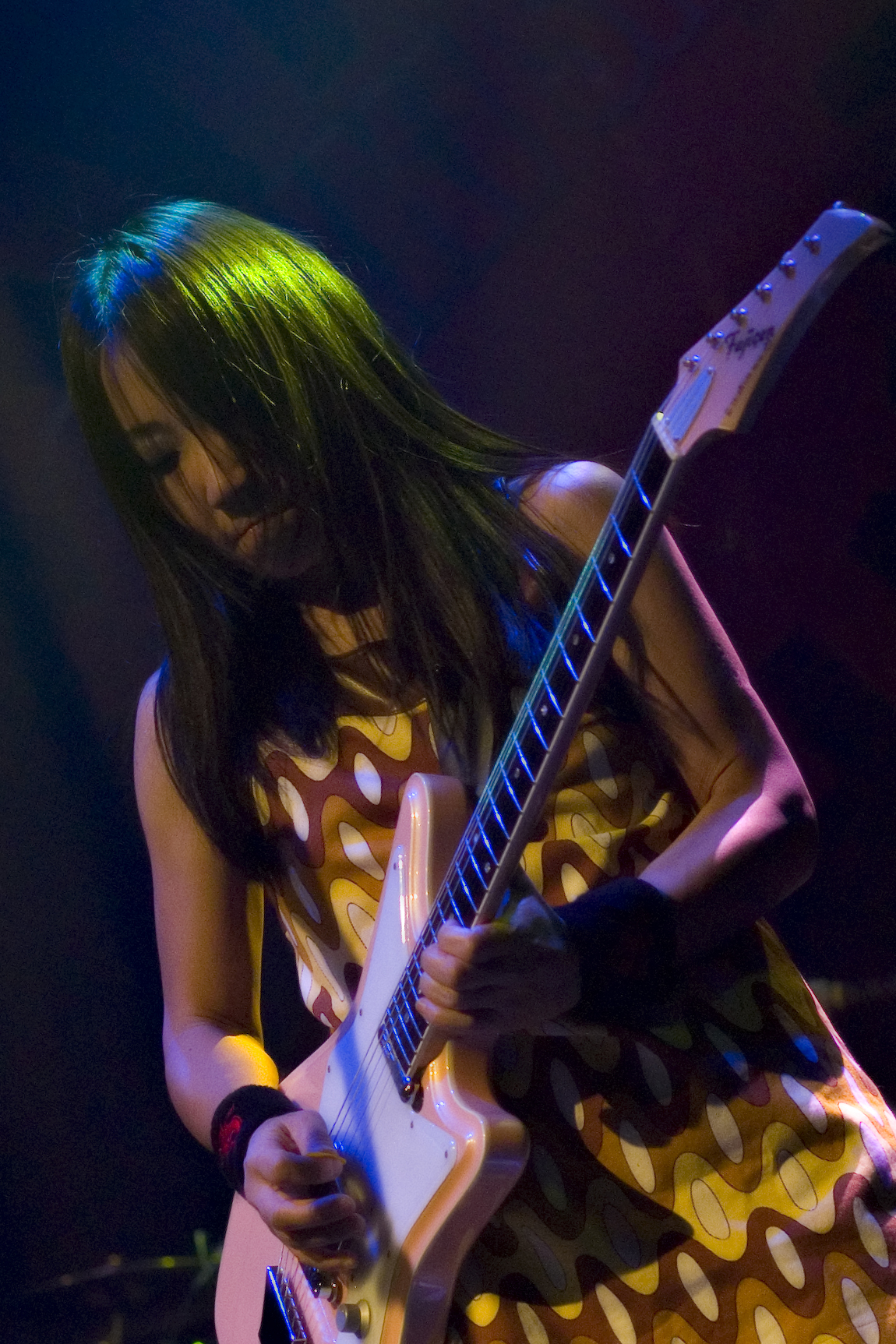
All of the album's lyrics were written by band member Naoko Yamano.

In an interview with 100PercentRock.com, Yamano explained that her process for writing and recording has not changed substantially since the band's early days: "I’m lazy and I don’t start writing songs until we book recording studio [sic], but once we booked the studio, I can write songs quickly with concentration. Then I send my demo to our members and we rehearse. At the recording studio, we start to record from basic tracks then overdub." On this album, every member of the band also sings a unique song about a food item; Yamano sings "Fortune Cookie", the band's bassist Ritsuko Taneda lends her vocals to "Ramen Rock", and drummer Emi Morimoto can be heard on "Green Tea". The first song was inspired by Yamano fondness for eating a fortune cookie after a meal of Chinese food in America; after learning that the cookies were a Japanese invention, Yamano decided to pen the song. "Ramen Rock" was inspired by Taneda's habit of eating ramen after every show. As for "Green Tea", Yamano asked Morimoto to sing the song because she is from Kyoto, which is known for its green tea.

Other lyrical themes include on the album include tennis in "Jet Shot", and cats in "Like a Cat". Regarding the former, Yamano expressed in an interview that she had always wanted to sing about tennis, but felt that the topic did not fit well with the style of the band's music. She revisited this opinion after watching a tennis match on television in which the announcer referred to a move made by Kei Nishikori as a "great jet shot". Yamano was struck by the phrase, and used it as inspiration for a song about wanting to be a more aggressive tennis player. "Like a Cat" joins the long canon of Shonen Knife songs about cats. Yamano explained, "I just like cats. Dogs are sometimes too earnest, but cats are so free." The band released a music video for the song, featuring cat videos submitted by their fans the world over. For the non-Japan releases of the album, all songs were recorded with English lyrics. However, for the domestic release of the album, "Dance to the Rock", "Shopping", and "Like a Cat" were recorded with Japanese lyrics.

== Critical reception ==
Professional ratings
Aggregate scores
Source	Rating
Metacritic	67/100
Review scores
Source	Rating
AllMusic	3/5 stars
Drowned in Sound	6/10
NME	7/10
PopMatters	6/10 stars
The Skinny	4/5 stars

Overdrive received moderately positive reviews from critics; Metacritic, a review aggregator website, gave the album an average score of 67 out of 100 from 17 reviews, which indicates "generally favourable reviews". NME awarded the album 7 out of 10 stars, with reviewer Stuart Huggett arguing that the album contained "personal and political lyrics far smarter than Shonen Knife’s cartoon image suggests." Will Fitzpatrick of The Skinny awarded the album four out of five stars, writing that "Overdrive's sugary take on 70s dinosaur rock" is replete with a "never-ending supply of bubblegum hooks".

Zachary Houle of PopMatters awarded the album six out of ten stars, and mused that Shonen Knife's fusing of punk and classic rock on the album "somehow work[s]". Houle, however, was critical of the band's penchant for bordering closely on copying other artists' music; he argued that "Bad Luck Song" and "Black Crow" are strikingly similar to Thin Lizzy's "The Boys Are Back in Town" and Kiss's "Black Diamond", respectively, but felt that "the album gets better as it goes along".

Mark Deming of AllMusic awarded the album three out of five stars, commenting on the band's musical shift; he wrote, "By Shonen Knife's standards, Overdrive does sound like some sort of hard rock album, and the attempts to make like Kiss, Thin Lizzy, or Deep Purple come off better than one might expect, though Yamano's guitar skills are less impressive than those of the average metal axe slinger." Deming complimented the charm of the album, but criticized Yamano's lyrics as "run-of-the-mill", ill-fitting the change in musical direction. The site selected "Black Crow", "Ramen Rock", and "Green Tea" as album highlights. Joe Goggins of Drowned in Sound awarded the album 6 out of 10 stars, and complimented the band for successfully managing to release nineteen studio albums. However, he was slightly critical of the "derivative" nature of the band's sound, as well as their "one-dimensional guitar playing and unrelentingly trivial lyrics".

== Promotion ==
To promote Overdrive, Shonen Knife embarked on a North American tour in the fall of 2014. The band's first show was on September 11, 2014, in Philadelphia, Pennsylvania, while their final stop was at Asbury Park, New Jersey, on October 21 of the same year. Although most of the tour was confined to the United States, the band also played two Canadian shows in Toronto (September 20) and Montreal (September 21), respectively. During the tour—which saw Shonen Knife play their 1000th show—Atsuko Yamano, one of the band's founding members, rejoined the group as a touring musician (in 2016, she would rejoin as a full member).

== Track listing ==
No.	Title	Writer(s)	Length
1.	"Bad Luck Song"	Naoko Yamano	4:12
2.	"Black Crow"	Yamano	4:43
3.	"Dance to the Rock"	Yamano	3:55
4.	"Ramen Rock"	Yamano	4:25
5.	"Shopping"	Yamano	3:29
6.	"Fortune Cookie"	Yamano	3:10
7.	"Like a Cat"	Yamano	3:32
8.	"Green Tea"	Yamano	2:59
9.	"Robots from Hell"	Yamano	4:52
10.	"Jet Shot"	Yamano	3:50
Total length:			39:18

== Personnel ==
- Naoko Yamano – guitar, vocals
- Ritsuko Taneda – bass, backing vocals
- Emi Morimoto – drums, backing vocals
