= Sweet Candy Power =

Studio album by Shonen Knife
- Released: 5 June 2019
- Genres: Pop-punk; alternative rock
- Length: 32:21
- Label: Good Charamel Records

Shonen Knife chronology
Alive! In Osaka (2017)	Sweet Candy Power (2019)	Our Best Place (2023)

Sweet Candy Power is a studio album by the Japanese pop-punk band Shonen Knife, released in June 2019. It features guest appearances by former band members Ritsuko Taneda and Naru Ishizuka.

== Critical reception ==
Reviewers in the alternative rock community generally praised the album as a continuation of Shonen Knife's history. The Spill Magazine noted that "The album stays true to their familiar sound of loud, driving chords layered with sugary melodic narratives of food and simple enjoyments." Rock at Night called the album "pure punk-pop pleasure but don’t be fooled by the light-hearted, infectious melodies, food-oriented themes, and sweet harmonies—there’s plenty of lead guitar riffs and pogo-dancing beats, that remind us Shonen Knife are serious musicians." Guitar Girl called the album "an exuberant good time, wrapped in a cute package [and] guaranteed to put a smile on your face." In a review of the album Punknews.org stated that "The ability of this band to blend their unmistakable pop sensibilities with their love for punk rock is first rate."

== Track listing ==
No.	Title	Length
1.	"Party"	2:04
2.	"Dizzy"	3:48
3.	"Sweet Candy Power"	2:56
4.	"My Independent Country"	3:47
5.	"Wave Rock"	3:06
6.	"Ice Cream Cookie Sandwiches"	2:36
7.	"Never-Never Land"	4:19
8.	"Peppermint Attack"	3:47
9.	"California Lemon Trees"	3:51
10.	"Match 3"	2:07
Total length:		32:21

== Personnel ==
- Naoko Yamano - guitar, vocals
- Atsuko Yamano - bass, backing vocals
- Risa Kawano - drums, backing vocals
