= Pop Tune =

Studio album by Shonen Knife
- Released: June 6, 2012
- Recorded: March 2012
- Genre: Pop-punk
- Label: P-Vine, Good Charamel, Damnably
- Producer: Naoko Yamano

Shonen Knife chronology
Osaka Ramones (2011)	Pop Tune (2012)	Overdrive (2014)

Pop Tune is the 18th studio album by pop-punk trio Shonen Knife. It was released in Japan on June 6, 2012, and in early June in the U.S., U.K., and Europe. Along with lead guitar and main vocalist Naoko, the group's bassist, Ritsuko, provides the lead vocals for the song "Sunshine" and drummer Emi is the lead vocalist for the song "Psychedelic Life". "Osaka Rock City" was used as the theme song for the 2013 Japanese film Soul Flower Train.

== Track listing ==
1. "Welcome to the Rock Club"
2. "Pop Tune"
3. "Osaka Rock City"
4. "All You Can Eat"
5. "Paper Clip"
6. "Psychedelic Life"
7. "Mr. J"
8. "Ghost Train"
9. "Sunshine"
10. "Move On"

== Personnel ==
- Naoko Yamano - guitar, vocals
- Ritsuko Taneda - bass, backing vocals
- Emi Morimoto - drums, backing vocals
