= Alive! In Osaka =

- The North American release cover; Australian and Japanese releases have a live performance photo with either color and a pink border (Japan) or black-and-white with radiating album title and artist name (Australia)

Live album video by Shonen Knife
- Released: March 14, 2018
- Recorded: December 2017
- Venue: Fandango in Jūsō-honmachi, Osaka, Osaka, Japan
- Genre: Pop punk
- Length: 66:47
- Language: English
- Label: Good Charamel, P-Vine

Shonen Knife chronology
Adventure (2016)	Alive! In Osaka (2018)	Sweet Candy Power (2019)

Alive! In Osaka is a 2018 live video album from Japanese pop punk band Shonen Knife.

== Reception ==
Writing for The Spill Magazine, Aaron Badgley rated this release a seven out of 10, noting that the video release shows that Shonen Knife is "incredibly fun to watch live and one sees how much they enjoy what they are doing", and calls this set they perform "excellent".

== Track listing ==
All songs written by Naoko Yamano, except where noted

1. "Pop Tune" – 3:28
2. "Super Group" – 3:45
3. "Banana Chips" – 2:30
4. "Twist Barbie" – 2:18
5. "Bear Up Bison" – 2:21
6. "Bad Luck Song" – 4:12
7. "Green Tangerine" – 3:47
8. "Move On" – 4:23
9. "Jump into the New World" – 3:06
10. "Rock'n'roll T-shirt" – 4:21
11. "Cruel to Be Kind" (Ian Gomm and Nick Lowe) – 3:33
12. "All You Can Eat" – 3:38
13. "Sushi Bar Song" – 1:39
14. "Wasabi" – 2:36
15. "Ramen Rock" – 4:12
16. "Riding on the Rocket" – 3:34
17. "Buttercup (I'm a Super Girl)" – 2:40
18. "Pyramid Power" – 3:41
19. "Antonio Baka Guy" – 3:56
20. "It's a New Find" – 3:28
21. "BBQ Party" – 2:39

== Personnel ==
Shonen Knife

- Risa Kawano – drums
- Atsuko Yamano – lead vocals, bass guitar, kazoo
- Naoko Yamano – lead vocals, guitar

== See also ==
- List of 2018 albums
