= Our Best Place =

Studio album by Shonen Knife
- Released: February 15, 2023
- Recorded: Osaka, Japan
- Genre: Pop-punk
- Length: 42:44
- Languages: English, Japanese
- Labels: Good Charamel, P-Vine

Shonen Knife chronology
| Sweet Candy Power (2019) | Our Best Place (2023) |

Our Best Place is a 2023 studio album by Japanese pop-punk band Shonen Knife. The album has been promoted with music videos and a tour and has received positive critical reception.

== Recording, release, and promotion ==
Our Best Place continues Shonen Knife's focus on writing food-related songs, expanding from the candy focus of 2019's Sweet Candy Power. The band promoted the release with their first tour since the COVID-19 pandemic. The band released a music video for "Mujinto Rock" on February 6 to promote the release. The song "Just a Smile" is a cover of the 1975 original by the Scottish band Pilot.

== Critical reception ==
According to The Spill Magazine, the album returns Shonen Knife to "the playfulness of their early sound with the hard rock influence that they’ve adopted as of late", and that the album "is an eagerly anticipated return to their roots, especially for long-time fans." ThePunkSite.com noted that "it’s an album that sees Shonen Knife do what they do best, just be themselves," while "there’s something timeless, life affirming and comforting knowing they will always be there if you need a pick me up." Tim Sendra of AllMusic gave the album a favorable review, and concluded that "It's heartening to know that the band are still making records this good after so long, one that should put punk-pop groups half their age or more on notice." Writing for PopMatters, Christopher J. Lee gave this album a seven out of 10, noting that the music "conforms to their past work, which, depending on your taste, is a good or bad thing" and also "an excellent example of this established approach".

Editors at AllMusic included this on their list of favorite rock albums of 2023.

== Track listing ==
1. "Mujinto Rock" – 4:01
2. "Nice Day" – 3:30
3. "The Story of Baumkuchen" – 2:23
4. "Vamos Taquitos" – 3:39
5. "Spicy Veggie Curry" – 3:00
6. "Girl's Rock" (2023 Version) – 3:07
7. "Afternoon Tea" – 3:19
8. "Ocean Sunfish" – 3:26
9. "Better" – 3:12
10. "Just a Smile" – 3:38

CD-only bonus tracks

11. "Nice Day" (60's Mix) – 3:32
12. "The Story of Baumkuchen" (Japanese Version – “Baumkuchen no Hanashi”) – 2:25
13. "Girl's Rock" (2023 Japanese Version) – 3:09

== Personnel ==
Shonen Knife

- Risa Kawano – drums, lead vocals on "Afternoon Tea," backing vocals
- Atsuko Yamano – bass guitar, lead vocals on "Vamos Taquitos," backing vocals
- Naoko Yamano – guitar, bass guitar on "Mujinto Rock" and "Nice Day," keyboards, percussion, lead vocals, backing vocals

Additional musicians

- Naru Ishizuka – bass guitar on "Afternoon Tea," backing vocals

== See also ==
- List of 2023 albums
