= Let's Knife =

Studio album by Shonen Knife
- Released: August 26, 1992
- Genre: Indie rock, pop punk
- Length: 52:32
- Label: MCA
- Producer: Shonen Knife

Shonen Knife chronology
712 (1991)	Let's Knife (1992)	Rock Animals (1993)

Professional ratings
Review scores
Source	Rating
AllMusic	3.5/5 stars

Let's Knife is a studio album by Shonen Knife. It was originally released on August 26, 1992, in Japan. The album features re-recorded versions of earlier Shonen Knife songs, with new English lyrics. It peaked at number 64 on the Oricon Albums Chart. In 2007, Rolling Stone Japan placed it at number 37 on its list of the "100 Greatest Japanese Rock Albums of All Time".

In 2026, Shonen Knife re-recorded Let's Knife and released it as a separate studio album titled Let's Knife Re-Cut.

== Track listing ==
No.	Title	Writer(s)	Length
1.	"Riding on the Rocket"	N. Yamano	3:46
2.	"Bear Up Bison"	N. Yamano	2:15
3.	"Twist Barbie"	N. Yamano	3:56
4.	"Tortoise Brand Pot Cleaner's Theme (Sea Turtle)"	N. Yamano	1:41
5.	"Antonio Baka Guy"	N. Yamano	1:59
6.	"Ah, Singapore"	N. Yamano	2:00
7.	"Flying Jelly Attack"	N. Yamano	2:39
8.	"Black Bass"	N. Yamano	4:36
9.	"Cycling Is Fun"	Nakatani	4:29
10.	"Watchin' Girl"	Nakatani	2:00
11.	"I Am a Cat"	N. Yamano	4:43
12.	"Tortoise Brand Pot Cleaner's Theme (Green Tortoise)"	N. Yamano	1:20
13.	"Devil House"	Nakatani	2:59
14.	"Insect Collector"	N. Yamano	2:46
15.	"Burning Farm"	N. Yamano	5:16

US edition bonus tracks
No.	Title	Writer(s)	Length
16.	"Get the Wow"	N. Yamano	2:19
17.	"Milky Way"	N. Yamano	3:48

UK limited edition bonus disc
No.	Title	Length
1.	"Ah, Singapore" (karaoke version)	2:04
2.	"Devil House" (karaoke version)	3:05
3.	"Tortoise Brand Pot Cleaner's Theme (Green Tortoise)" (karaoke version)	1:47
4.	"I Am a Cat" (karaoke version)	4:53
5.	"Insect Collector" (karaoke version)	2:49

== Personnel ==
Credits adapted from the liner notes.

- Naoko Yamano – vocals, guitar
- Michie Nakatani – vocals, bass guitar
- Atsuko Yamano – vocals, drums, percussion, keyboards

== Charts ==
Chart	Peak position
Japanese Albums (Oricon)	64
