= Super Group =

Studio album by Shonen Knife
- Released: 7 November 2008
- Recorded: 2008
- Genre: Pop-punk
- Label: P-Vine-Good Charamel-Damnably
- Producer: Naoko Yamano and Atsushi Shibata

Shonen Knife chronology
| Fun! Fun! Fun! (2007) | Super Group (2008) | Free Time (2010) |

Professional ratings
Review scores
| Source | Rating |
|---|---|
| NEO Magazine | 4.5/5 stars |

Super Group is an album by the Japanese rock trio Shonen Knife. It was released in Japan on 7 November 2008, in the USA on 20 May 2009, and in the UK and Europe in 2010. The original Japanese CD issue was released as a mini-LP cartoon package with a gatefold and poster inside.

The album contains Shonen Knife typical Ramones-like pop punk and a cover of Paul McCartney's tune "Jet".

== Track listing ==
All tracks written by Naoko Yamano except "Jet", written by Paul and Linda McCartney, and "Top Of The World" by Richard Carpenter.

1. "Super Group"
2. "Slug"
3. "Muddy Bubbles Hell"
4. "Deer Biscuits"
5. "BBQ Party"
6. "Pyramid Power"
7. "Time Warp"
8. "Na Na Na"
9. "Your Guitar"
10. "Jet"
11. "Top of the World"

== Bonus tracks ==
- "Evil Birds" (US version)
- "Lazybone (Live)" (UK version)
- "Muddy Bubbles Hell (Live)" (UK version)
- "Riding on the Rocket (Live)" (UK version)

== Personnel ==
- Naoko Yamano - guitar, vocals
- Ritsuko Taneda - bass, backing vocals
- Etsuko Nakanishi - drums, backing vocals
