= Happy Hour (Shonen Knife album) =

Studio album by Shonen Knife
- Released: June 23, 1998
- Genre: Pop punk
- Length: 39:19
- Label: Big Deal

Shonen Knife chronology
Brand New Knife (1997)	Happy Hour (1998)	Strawberry Sound (2000)

Professional ratings
Review scores
Source	Rating
AllMusic	2/5 stars
PopMatters	6/10 stars

Happy Hour is a 1998 album by the Japanese rock trio Shonen Knife. The cover artwork is by Yoshitomo Nara. It is the last album by the group with their original bass guitarist, Michie Nakatani.

== "Banana Chips" ==
=== Release ===
Ahead of the album's release, "Banana Chips" was released as an official single. The European edition of the CD single included three versions of the song: the English version, the Japanese version, and a remix called the "EYƎ Mix". The Japanese edition of the CD single included the Japanese mix and the EYƎ Mix, as well as two other remixes.

=== Music video ===
A music video for the song was released. It is animated, and features the members of Shonen Knife as animated performers, performing for a crowd of bananas.

=== Reception ===
"Banana Chips" received mixed reviews from music critics. AllMusic, in their review of Happy Hour, stated that the song held "fast to" the group's "usual obsessions", while PopMatters called the track "frolicking".

== Critical reception ==
The album garnered mixed reviews upon its release. PopMatters' Sarah Zupko praised the album and said that "Happy Hour is rolicking frolick through bubblegum pop culture—all perfect pop melodies, shiny choruses, and songs about cookies, hot chocolate, sushi, and banana chips", concluding that "this record is one helluva guilty pleasure." AllMusic's review, written by Jason Ankeny, was less positive, stating "the Shonen Knife aesthetic has become pure formula, and the joke just isn't that funny anymore."

Musicologist Brooke McCorkle Okazaki's book on the album for the 33 1/3 Japan series considers the band's positioning as "josei rock"—music by women not fitting neatly into mass-marketed categories—and the expression of gender and food culture in their songs.

== Track listing ==
All songs written by Naoko Yamano, except where noted.

1. "Shonen Knife Planet"
2. "Konnichiwa"
3. "Cookie Day"
4. "Hot Chocolate"
5. "Sushi Bar Song"
6. "Fish Eyes" (Michie Nakatani)
7. "Banana Chips"
8. "Dolly"
9. "Jackalope" (Nakatani)
10. "Gyoza"
11. "Catch Your Bus" (Nakatani)
12. "People Traps"
13. "His Pet"
14. "Daydream Believer" (John Stewart)

Notes:

- "Sushi Bar Song" features backing vocals by the band The Presidents of the United States of America.
- The demo release of this CD has an additional Michie Nakatani song, "Huge Snail".

== Personnel ==
- Naoko Yamano – guitar, vocals
- Michie Nakatani – bass, keyboards, vocals
- Atsuko Yamano – drums, backing vocals
