= Shonen Knife (album) =

Compilation album by Shonen Knife
- Released: 1990
- Recorded: July 1985 – April 1986
- Genre: Pop punk, post punk, indie rock
- Label: Gasatanka/Giant

Shonen Knife chronology
Pretty Little Baka Guy (1986)	Shonen Knife (1990)	712 (1991)

Professional ratings
Review scores
Source	Rating
AllMusic	4.5/5 stars
Christgau's Consumer Guide	C+
Rolling Stone	4/5 stars

Shonen Knife is a 1990 release by Shonen Knife compiling their first two albums, Burning Farm (1983) and Yama-no Attchan (1984), for the US market. It was released with an accompanying booklet containing the names of each song translated from Japanese to English.

== Track listing ==
1. "Watchin’ Girl"
2. "Banana Fish"
3. "Miracles"
4. "Parallel Woman"
5. "Twist Barbie"
6. "Elephant Pao Pao"
7. "Tortoise Brand Pot Scrubbing Cleaner’s Theme"
8. "Animal Song"
9. "A Day At The Factory"
10. "Burning Farm"
11. "An Angel Has Come"
12. "Cycling Is Fun"
13. "Elmar Elevator"
14. "Banana Leaf"
15. "Chinese Song"
16. "Flying Jelly Attack"
17. "Cannibal Papaya"
18. "Dali’s Sunflower"
19. "Insect Collector"
20. "Bye Bye"
21. "Parrot Polynesia"
