= Rock Animals =

Studio album by Shonen Knife
- Released: September 8, 1993
- Genre: Indie rock, pop punk
- Length: 48:20
- Label: MCA
- Producer: Shonen Knife, Paige Porazzo

Shonen Knife chronology
Let's Knife (1992)	Rock Animals (1993)	Brand New Knife (1996)

Professional ratings
Review scores
Source	Rating
AllMusic	2/5 stars
Rolling Stone	2/5 stars

Rock Animals is a studio album by Shonen Knife. It was released on September 8, 1993, in Japan. It peaked at number 59 on the Oricon Albums Chart, as well as number 39 on Billboard's Heatseekers Albums chart.

== Track listing ==
No.	Title	Writer(s)	Length
1.	"Quavers"	Naoko Yamano	3:25
2.	"Concrete Animals"	Yamano	4:29
3.	"Butterfly Boy"	Michie Nakatani	4:59
4.	"Little Tree"	Yamano	3:55
5.	"Catnip Dream"	Nakatani	4:39
6.	"Tomato Head"	Yamano	5:21
7.	"Another Day"	Nakatani	4:36
8.	"Brown Mushrooms"	Yamano	4:36
9.	"Johnny, Johnny, Johnny"	Nakatani	2:48
10.	"Cobra Versus Mongoose"	Yamano	4:15
11.	"Music Square"	Yamano	4:56

== Personnel ==
Credits adapted from the liner notes.

Shonen Knife

- Naoko Yamano – vocals, guitar, harmonica
- Michie Nakatani – vocals, bass guitar, keyboards
- Atsuko Yamano – vocals, drums, percussion

Additional musicians

- Thurston Moore – guitar (on "Butterfly Boy")
- Millie-Willy – vocals (on "Catnip Dream")
- Motoi Semba – keyboards, computer programming

Production

- Shonen Knife – producer
- Paige Porazzo – producer, executive producer
- Ohji Hayashi – recording engineer
- Jim Waters – recording engineer
- Akio Tanabe – recording engineer, mixing (on "Another Day" and "Music Square")
- Don Fleming – mixing (on all tracks except "Another Day" and "Music Square")

== Charts ==
Chart	Peak position
Japanese Albums (Oricon)	59
US Heatseekers Albums (Billboard)	39
