= Brand New Knife =

Studio album by Shonen Knife
- Released: April 15, 1997
- Genre: Pop-punk
- Length: 46:37
- Label: Big Deal

Shonen Knife chronology
Rock Animals (1993)	Brand New Knife (1997)	Happy Hour (1998)

Professional ratings
Review scores
Source	Rating
Allmusic	link
NME	7/10

Brand New Knife is a 1997 album by the Japanese rock trio Shonen Knife. The Japanese version of this album contains six tracks with English lyrics and seven versions of the tracks with Japanese lyrics. The U.S. version features all 13 tracks in English, with the Japanese versions of the seven tracks featured as bonus tracks. In 2020, Jonathan McNamara of The Japan Times listed it as one of the 10 Japanese albums worthy of inclusion on Rolling Stone's 2020 list of the 500 greatest albums of all time.

== Track listing ==
All songs written by Naoko Yamano, except where noted.

1. "Explosion!" - 4:10
2. "Wind Your Spring" - 3:27
3. "Perfect World" (Michie Nakatani) - 3:51
4. "E.S.P" - 3:30
5. "Loop Di Loop" (Shonen Knife) - 3:12
6. "Wonder Wine" - 3:11
7. "Magic Joe" - 3:58
8. "Fruits & Vegetables" (Nakatani) - 2:29
9. "Tower of the Sun" - 4:25
10. "Keep on Rockin'" - 4:30
11. "Frogphobia" (Nakatani) - 2:58
12. "Buddha's Face" - 4:51
13. "One Week" - 2:04

US version bonus tracks

14. "Explosion!" [Japanese] - 4:10
15. "Wind Your Spring" [Japanese] - 3:26
16. "E.S.P." [Japanese] - 3:29
17. "Wonder Wine" [Japanese] - 3:10
18. "Fruits and Vegetables" [Japanese] (Nakatani) - 2:30
19. "Tower of the Sun" [Japanese] - 4:24
20. "Frogphobia" [Japanese] (Nakatani) - 2:59

== Personnel ==
- Naoko Yamano - guitar, vocals
- Michie Nakatani - bass, keyboards, vocals
- Atsuko Yamano - drums, backing vocals
