= Fun! Fun! Fun! =

Studio album by Shonen Knife
- Released: July 6, 2007
- Genre: Pop-punk
- Label: Blues Interactions Japan

Shonen Knife chronology
Genki Shock! (2006)	Fun! Fun! Fun! (2007)	Super Group (2008)

Fun! Fun! Fun! is a pop-punk album by Japanese pop punk band Shonen Knife, released on July 6, 2007 on Blues Interactions Japan. The album marked the 25th anniversary of the band.

A remastered version with all-English lyrics (catalog number BF-7CD) was on sale during the band's European tour in 2009. The cover art of the English version has a blue background in place of the Japanese version's green background, and is in a regular CD jewel case instead of the Japanese version's cardboard gate-fold case.

== Track listing (Japanese version) ==
1. "重力無重力"
2. "Barnacle" (ふじつぼ)
3. "Flu" (インフルエンザ)
4. "Ramones Forever"
5. "Las Vegas"
6. "Birthday"
7. "ポップコーン" (Popcorn)
8. "クッキーたべたい" (I Wanna Eat Cookies)
9. "みなみのしま" (Southern Islands)
10. "おやすみ" (Goodnight)

== Track listing (English version) ==
Cover of English version (BF-7CD)

1. Gravity Zero Gravity
2. Barnacle
3. Flu
4. Ramones Forever
5. Las Vegas
6. Birthday
7. Popcorn
8. I Wanna Eat Cookies
9. Southern Islands
10. Good Night

== Personnel ==
- Naoko Yamano - guitar, vocals
- Atsuko Yamano - bass, backing vocals
- Etsuko Nakanishi - drums, backing vocals
