= Pretty Little Baka Guy =

Studio album by Shonen Knife
- Released: 1986
- Recorded: July 1985 – April 1986
- Genre: Pop punk, post punk, indie rock
- Label: Subversive Records (US)
- Producer: Shonen Knife, Shin Hirakawa & Yasushi Utsunomiya

Shonen Knife chronology
Yama-no Attchan (1984)	Pretty Little Baka Guy (1986)	Shonen Knife (1990)

Professional ratings
Review scores
Source	Rating
AllMusic	4.5/5 stars

Pretty Little Baka Guy is a 1986 album by the female Japanese rock trio Shonen Knife. It was re-released in the US as side one of a record/tape, with side two being Live in Japan (see below). There have been many releases of this album in various countries over the years, with each release containing different rare tracks.

== Track listing ==
Side one

1. "Making Plans for Bison"
2. "Summertime Boogie"
3. "I Wanna Eat Chocobars"
4. "Public Bath"
5. "Devil House"

Side two

1. "Antonio Baka Guy"
2. "Ice Cream City"
3. "Ah, Singapore"
4. "Riding on the Rocket"
5. "Kappa Extract"

=== Bonus tracks on Live in Japan segment ===
1. "Lazybone"
2. "Ice Cream City"
3. "Baggs"
4. "Kappa Ex"
5. "Antonio Baka Guy"

=== CD/cassette additional tracks ===
11. "Spider"
12. "Secret Dance"
13. "I'm a Realist"

=== Vinyl only additional tracks ===
1. "Chains" (Cookies cover)
2. "Suzy Is a Headbanger" (Ramones cover)
3. "I Wanna Be Your (Wo)Man" (Beatles cover)

=== US Oglio re-release bonus tracks ===
1. "Riding on the Rocket" (live)
2. "Kappa Ex" (live)

=== Japanese re-release bonus tracks ===
6. "Cherry Bomb" (The Runaways cover)

== Personnel ==
- Naoko Yamano – guitar, vocals
- Michie Nakatani – bass, keyboards, vocals
- Atsuko Yamano – drums, backing vocals
