= Burning Farm =

Studio album by Shonen Knife
- Released: July 21, 1983
- Recorded: March 20 – June 6, 1983
- Genres: Pop punk, post punk, indie rock
- Producers: Shonen Knife and Shin Hirakawa

Shonen Knife chronology
Minna Tanoshiku (1982)	Burning Farm (1983)	Yama-no Attchan (1984)

Professional ratings
Review scores
Source	Rating
AllMusic	link

Burning Farm is the first album by Shonen Knife. It is almost entirely in Japanese, with only "Twist Barbie" on the original release in English. The Japanese 8" vinyl (Zero Records 0-0783) had eight songs. The CD re-issue bonus tracks "Parrot Polynesia", "Watchin' Girl" and "Banana Fish" first appeared on the Zero Records compilation LP Aura Music in November 1983.

The other CD bonus songs are either "Watchin' Girl" and "Twist Barbie" live (Oglio Records), or "Ukkari Hachibei" and a cover of The Ramones' "I Wanna Be Sedated" (MCA Records, Japan).

The album's cover was painted by bass guitarist Michie Nakatani.

There are at least two pressings of the 8 inch record, with different labels and back covers. One back is black with a live photo, the other is yellow with a posed group photo. Both pressings misspell the third track as "Twist Birbie".

K Records released, in small quantities, Burning Farm on audiocassette in the United States with a different cover and track listing. In 1993, Kurt Cobain listed it in his top fifty albums of all time.

== Track listing ==
All songs written by Naoko Yamano, except where noted.

1. "Miracles" (Michie Nakatani) – 2:16
2. "Parallel Woman" – 2:58
3. "Twist Barbie" – 2:34
4. "Elephant Pao Pao" – 2:15
5. "Tortoise Brand Pot Cleaner" – 0:52
6. "Animal Song" (Nakatani) – 2:09
7. "A Day at the Factory" – 3:41
8. "Burning Farm" – 4:30

K Records cassette version:

1. "Watchin' Girl" (Nakatani) – 1:58
2. "Miracles" – 2:16
3. "Parallel Woman" – 2:58
4. "Twist Birbie" (sic) – 2:34
5. "A Day at the Factory" – 3:41
6. "Tortoise Brand Pot Cleaner's Theme" – 0:52
7. "Animal Song" (Nakatani) – 2:09
8. "Banana Fish" (Nakatani) – 2:04
9. "Elephant Pao Pao" – 2:15
10. "Parrot Polynesia" – 3:07
11. "Burning Farm" – 4:30

== Personnel ==
- Naoko Yamano – guitar, vocals
- Michie Nakatani – bass, keyboards, vocals
- Atsuko Yamano – drums, backing vocals
- Kaoru Okuda, Hiroaki Fukumaru, Kazujisa Fukumaru – percussion on "Burning Farm"
- Shin Hirakawa – percussion on "Parrott Polynesia"
