= Osaka Ramones =

Studio album by Shonen Knife
- Released: July 19, 2011
- Recorded: 2010–2011
- Genre: Punk rock
- Length: 33:25
- Label: P-Vine-Good Charamel-Damnably

Shonen Knife chronology
Free Time (2010)	Osaka Ramones (2011)	Pop Tune (2012)

Osaka Ramones is Japanese pop-punk group Shonen Knife's 16th studio album. All of the songs on the album are cover songs of the punk group Ramones. The album's cover art takes its inspiration from the Ramones album Road to Ruin. Five songs on the album were recorded in at GCR Audio in Buffalo, New York with Producer Robby Takac in late 2010 and it was intended to be a mini-album. Lead singer/guitarist/songwriter Naoko Yamano later decided that Osaka Ramones would be a full-length album celebrating Shonen Knife's 30th anniversary. The rest of the album was later recorded in Osaka, Japan and mixed at GCR Audio.

== Track listing ==
No.	Title	Writer(s)	Original album	Length
1.	"Blitzkrieg Bop"	Tommy, Dee Dee	Ramones	2:14
2.	"Rock 'n' Roll High School"	Johnny, Dee Dee, Joey	Rock 'n' Roll High School	2:22
3.	"We Want the Airwaves"	Joey	Pleasant Dreams	3:28
4.	"She’s the One"	Joey, Johnny, Dee Dee, Marky	Road to Ruin	2:18
5.	"Rockaway Beach"	Dee Dee	Rocket to Russia	2:08
6.	"Sheena Is a Punk Rocker"	Joey	Rocket to Russia	3:07
7.	"Scattergun"	C. J.	¡Adios Amigos!	2:35
8.	"Psycho Therapy"	Dee Dee, Johnny	Subterranean Jungle	2:30
9.	"The KKK Took My Baby Away"	Joey	Pleasant Dreams	2:33
10.	"We’re a Happy Family"	Joey, Johnny, Dee Dee, Tommy	Rocket to Russia	2:35
11.	"Chinese Rock"	Dee Dee, Richard Hell	End of the Century	2:28
12.	"Beat on the Brat"	Joey	Ramones	2:36
13.	"Pinhead"	Joey, Johnny, Dee Dee, Tommy	Leave Home	2:28

== Personnel ==
- Naoko Yamano - guitar, vocals
- Ritsuko Taneda - bass, backing vocals
- Emi Morimoto - drums, backing vocals
