= Millennium Edition (Shonen Knife album) =

Shonen Knife

Compilation album by Shonen Knife
- Released: 2001-12-05
- Genre: Pop-punk

Millennium Edition is a Shonen Knife compilation of material from 1996-1999 plus three unreleased versions of songs from Strawberry Sound.

== Track listing ==
1. "Wild Life"
2. "Cookie Day"
3. "E.S.P."
4. "It's A New Find"
5. "Fruits & Vegetables"
6. "People Traps"
7. "TV Commercial Song"
8. "One Week"
9. "Sushi Bar Song"
10. "Punk Rock Star"
11. "Banana Chips"
12. "Mysterious Drugstore"
13. "Daydream Believer"
14. "All I Want For Christmas..."
