= Heavy Songs =

Studio album by Shonen Knife
- Released: 23 May 2002
- Genre: Pop-punk

Shonen Knife chronology
Strawberry Sound (2000)	Heavy Songs (2002)	Candy Rock (2003)

Heavy Songs is a 2002 album by the Japanese rock group Shonen Knife.

== Track listing ==
1. "A Map Master"
2. "AAA"
3. "Golden Years Of Rock'n Roll"
4. "Rubber Band"
5. "Heavy Song"
6. "A Boogie Monster"
7. "Mushroom Hair Cut"
8. "Whatever"
9. "Pigmy Jerboa"
10. "An Elephant Insect"
11. "Computer Language"
12. "Mango Juice (for George Harrison)"

== Personnel ==
- Naoko Yamano - guitar, vocals
- Atsuko Yamano - bass, drums, backing vocals
