= Orange Sun =

Orange Sun may refer to:

- Orange Sun (song), a song by Shonen Knife
- a sunflower variety
- The orange sun, a 1965 novel by Romanian writer Camillo Baciu
- An orange giant or orange dwarf; a couple types of stars
