= Live in Osaka =

Live in Osaka may refer to:

== Albums ==
- Live in Osaka, Eastman Wind Ensemble
- Live in Osaka (Shonen Knife album) 2006
- No Substitutions: Live in Osaka live album by Larry Carlton and Steve Lukather 2001
- Live in Osaka, disc by Painkiller in the Japanese edition of Execution Ground
- Secret Show: Live in Osaka The Aristocrats (band)
