= Free time (disambiguation) =

Free time, traditionally usually called leisure time or leisure, refers to the time when one is not working. It may also refer to:

- Free time (music), a type of musical meter free from musical time and time signature
- Freetime (album), an album by Spyro Gyra
- The Sims 2: FreeTime, The Sims 2 expansion pack
- Freetime (TV series), 1980s British children's television show
- Free Time (album), a 2010 album by Shonen Knife
- Free Time (EP), a 2019 extended play by Australian singer Ruel
- Kindle FreeTime, a suite of parental controls
