= Millennium Edition =

Millennium Edition may refer to:

- Millennium Edition (DC Comics), the umbrella title of 62 one-shot comic books published by DC Comics in 2000 and 2001
- Millennium Edition (Elkie Brooks album), 2000
- Millennium Edition (Shonen Knife album), 2001
- Windows ME, short for Windows Millennium Edition
