= DJ Sashimi =

Japanese DJ, musician, J-Pop artist

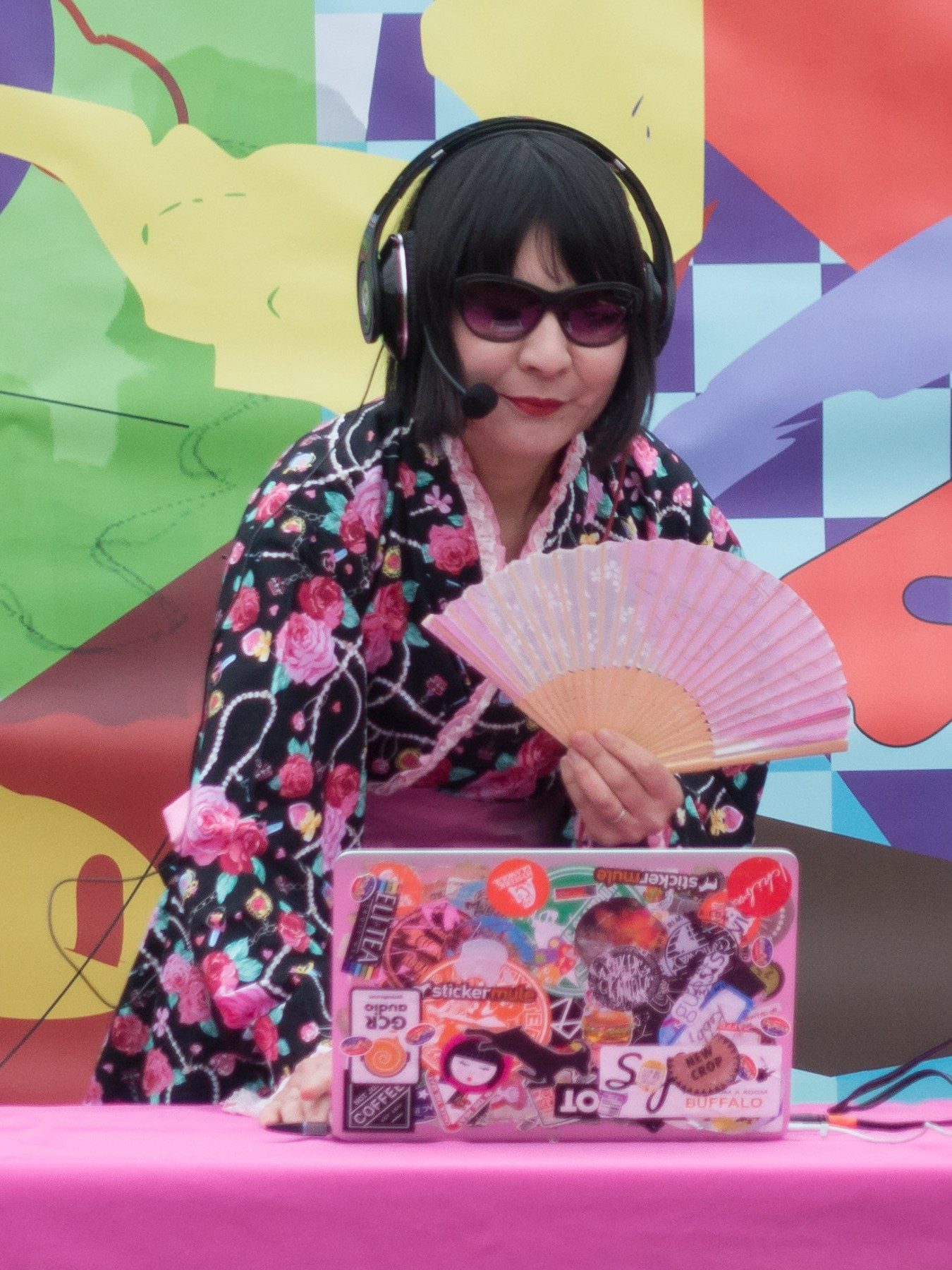
- DJ Sashimi performing at Sakura Matsuri 2019 in Brooklyn Botanic Garden.

Background information
- Born: 28 November 1989
- Origin: Tokyo, Japan
- Genres: EDM, J-POP, pop
- Years active: 2010–present
- Labels: Good Charamel Records

DJ Sashimi is a Japanese DJ, musician, J-Pop artist whose first single "Japanese Girl in NY" was released by Good Charamel Records in 2010. The single Japanese Girl in NY was also included in Volume 1 of the I Love J Rock compilations. DJ Sashimi is produced by Goo Goo Dolls bassist Robby Takac. DJ Sashimi has performed sets at The Music is Art Festival in Buffalo, NY and opening slots for Shonen Knife and CJ Ramone. DJ Sashimi is currently working on her first release in nearly 8 years at Buffalo, NY's GCR Audio Recording Studios for release in Spring of 2018.

== Discography ==
- Japanese Girl in NY (Single) (2010)
- Smooth Sashimi (Michael Jackson Remix) (2018)
- Sakura Sakura (2018)
