= Adventure (Shonen Knife album) =

Studio album by Shonen Knife
- Released: 23 March 2016
- Genre: Pop-punk

Shonen Knife chronology
Overdrive (2014)	Adventure (2016)	Alive! In Osaka (2017)

Adventure is the 20th studio album by pop-punk band Shonen Knife. It was released in 2016. According to Bob Lange of Glide Magazine, Adventure is Shonen Knife's most rock-oriented album. According to Anna Rose, the lyrics of the songs in the album are upbeat. To promote the album, the band went on its "2017 USA Ramen Adventure Tour".

== Track list ==
All songs written by Naoko Yamano

No.	Title	Length
1.	"Jump Into the New World"	3:20
2.	"Rock'n'roll T-shirt"	4:10
3.	"Calabash"	3:50
4.	"Dog Fight"	2:48
5.	"Wasabi"	2:56
6.	"Green Tangerine (Kabosu)"	2:56
7.	"ImI (Emoji)"	2:40
8.	"Hawaii"	3:17
9.	"Tasmanian Devil"	3:44
10.	"Cotton Candy Clouds"	4:06

== Personnel ==
- Naoko Yamano - guitar, vocals
- Atsuko Yamano - bass, backing vocals
- Risa Kawano - drums, backing vocals
