= Razzle Dazzle (album) =

Studio album by Buck-Tick
- Released: October 13, 2010
- Recorded: 2010
- Studio: Victor; Prim Sound Studio Form; Galva; Hitokuchi-zaka; Sound Studio Dali
- Genre: Dance-rock
- Length: 63:14
- Label: Ariola Japan
- Producer: Buck-Tick

Buck-Tick chronology
Memento Mori (2009)	Razzle Dazzle (2010)	Catalogue Victor→Mercury 87–99 (2012)

Singles from Razzle Dazzle
- 1. "Dokudanjō Beauty" Released: March 24, 2010; 2. "Kuchizuke" Released: September 1, 2010

Razzle Dazzle is the seventeenth album by Japanese rock band Buck-Tick, released by Ariola Japan on October 13, 2010. Graphic artist Aquirax Uno provided the illustrations for the album's cover. The limited edition came with a DVD of music videos and an interview. It reached number six on both the Oricon chart and Billboard Japan, selling 20,384 copies.

== Overview ==
With Razzle Dazzle, Buck-Tick wanted to go beyond the straight rock "band sound" from their previous two albums. Incorporating elements of dance music, its title was taken from a song in the 2002 American musical film Chicago.

"Dokudanjō Beauty" was used as the second ending theme song for the Japanese airing of Battlestar Galactica. This album version features Lucy, vocalist of the all-female rock band LAZYgunsBRISKY, singing the chorus. The single version of "Kuchizuke" was used as the opening theme for the Shiki anime. The anime also used "Gekka Reijin", as its second ending song.

== Track listing ==
No.	Title	Lyrics	Music	Length
1.	"Razzle Dazzle Fragile"		Imai	1:18
2.	"Razzle Dazzle"	Imai	Imai	4:04
3.	"Kyōki no Dead Heat" (狂気のデッドヒート)	Sakurai	Hoshino	3:52
4.	"Dokudanjō Beauty -R.I.P.-" (独壇場 Beauty -R.I.P.-)	Imai	Imai	4:31
5.	"Hamushi no Yō ni" (羽虫のように)	Imai	Imai	3:52
6.	"Yōgetsu -Yōgetsu no Utage-" (妖月 -ようげつの宴-)	Sakurai	Hoshino	4:13
7.	"Bolero"	Imai	Imai	4:52
8.	"Django!!! -Genwaku no Django-" (Django!!! -眩惑のジャンゴ-)	Imai	Imai	4:48
9.	"Sakuran Baby" (錯乱 Baby)	Sakurai	Imai	4:36
10.	"Pixy"	Sakurai	Hoshino	4:29
11.	"Kuchizuke -Serial Thrill Kisser-" (くちづけ -SERIAL THRILL KISSER-)	Sakurai	Imai	4:30
12.	"Gekka Reijin" (月下麗人)	Sakurai	Imai	4:52
13.	"Mugen" (夢幻)	Sakurai	Hoshino	4:22
14.	"Tango Swanka"	Sakurai, Imai	Imai	3:37
15.	"Solaris"	Sakurai	Imai	5:18
Total length:				63:14

== Personnel ==
Buck-Tick

- Atsushi Sakurai – vocals
- Hisashi Imai – guitar, electronics, chorus
- Hidehiko Hoshino – electric guitar, acoustic guitar, chorus
- Yutaka Higuchi – bass
- Toll Yagami – drums

Additional performers

- Kazutoshi Yokoyama – manipulator and keyboards on tracks 1–3, 5, 7–10 & 12–15
- Cube Juice – programming and synthesizer on tracks 4, 6 & 11
- Lucy (LAZYgunsBRISKY) – chorus on track 4
