= Genki Shock! =

Studio album by Shonen Knife
- Released: 11 April 2006
- Recorded: 2005
- Genre: Pop-punk
- Label: Glue Factory
- Producer: Naoko Yamano, Atsushi Shibata, Tetsuya Kotani (engineer)

Shonen Knife chronology
Candy Rock (2003)	Genki Shock! (2006)	Fun! Fun! Fun! (2007)

Professional ratings
Review scores
Source	Rating
AllMusic	3.5/5 stars
Pitchfork	7.4/10

Genki Shock! is a studio album by the female Japanese rock trio Shonen Knife, released in 2006. The cover design was created by singer/guitarist Naoko Yamano's toddler daughter, Emma.

== Track listing ==
=== Japanese edition ===
The cover of the Japanese edition has a yellow background. ["Original Japanese" - "Romaji ~ Translation"]

1. "イントロダクション" - "Intorodakushon ~ Introduction"
2. "ロック ソサエティ" - "Rokku Sosaeti ~ Rock Society"
3. "スパム警告" - "Supamu Keikoku ~ Spam Warning"
4. "アニメ現象" - "Anime Genshō ~ Anime Phenomenon"
5. "蜘蛛の家" - "Kumo no Ie ~ Spider House"
6. "めがね" - "Megane ~ Glasses"
7. "暗黒の女王" - "Ankoku no Joō ~ The Queen of Darkness"
8. "森林浴" - "Shinrinyoku ~ Forest Walk"
9. "ジーンズブルー" - "Jīnzuburū ~ Jeans Blue"
10. "枕の下に" - "Makura no Shita Ni ~ Under My Pillow"
11. "世界地図" - "Sekai Chizu ~ A World Atlas"
12. "ブロッコリーマン" - "Burokkorī Man ~ Broccoli Man"
13. "ジャイアント キティ" - "Jaianto Kiti ~ Giant Kitty"

=== US edition ===
The cover of the United States edition has a pink background.

1. "Introduction" – 0:41
2. "S*P*A*M" – 3:33
3. "Jeans Blue" – 3:06
4. "Anime Phenomenon" – 3:58
5. "Spider House" – 4:15
6. "My Magic Glasses" – 4:20
7. "The Queen of Darkness" – 4:49
8. "Forest Walk" – 4:48
9. "A World Atlas" – 3:35
10. "Broccoli Man" – 3:35
11. "Rock Society" – 2:31
12. "Under My Pillow" – 4:27
13. "Giant Kitty" – 4:35

== Personnel ==
- Naoko Yamano – guitar, vocals
- Atsuko Yamano – bass, drums, backing vocals
