= Last Conservative =

American alternative rock band from Buffalo, New York

- Origin: Buffalo, New York, U.S.
- Genres: Alternative rock, indie rock
- Years active: 1997–2008
- Labels: Good Charamel Records; LC Music Group

Last Conservative was an American alternative rock band from Buffalo, New York, active from 1997 to 2008. Blending alternative rock with melodic indie elements, the band became part of the Western New York independent music scene in the early 2000s. The group formed in 1997 and began releasing early singles and recordings the following year.

== History ==
=== Early years (1997–2000) ===
Last Conservative began in the mid-1990s as a high school band formed by four graduates of Lancaster High School: T. J. Zindle, Roger Bryan, Mike Zeis, and Jeff Pietrzak. The group was originally known as The Conservatives until discovering that other bands were already using that name.

In its early years, the band drew influence from artists such as Radiohead, Elvis Costello, Jeff Buckley, The Beatles,and Bob Dylan. According to vocalist and guitarist Zindle, the band “knew when to play quiet and when to play loud,” a dynamic approach that shaped their early sound.

By 1998, the lineup of Zindle, Bryan, Zeis, and Pietrzak solidified and the band entered the studio to record its debut full-length album, Unremarkable, released in 1999. Its first single, “Don’t Touch Me,” received airplay on Buffalo’s alternative station 103.3 The Edge and became a local favorite, especially among college radio listeners. Their second album, These In-Between Times, was released in 2002 on LC Music Group label produced by Armand John Petri and engineer Nick Blagona.

=== Rise and exposure (2001–2008) ===
In 2004, Last Conservative signed with Good Charamel Records, the independent label founded by Goo Goo Dolls bassist Robby Takac. That same year they released On to the Next One, produced by Takac. During this time the band had expanded its reach, touring the country consistently for more than a year, including showcase appearances in major markets such as Los Angeles and New York City. The band — then consisting of T. J. Zindle (vocals/guitar/songwriter), David Julian (guitar), Josh Mullin (bass), and Tom McCluskey (drums) — secured an main support spot for Bon Jovi, giving them a high-profile performance opportunity on a major arena-rock bill.

The band's final studio album, Pretty New Things, was released in 2006 and the band remained active until 2008.

== T. J. Zindle ==
Founding member T. J. Zindle served as the band’s main songwriter, guitarist and lead vocalist from 1998 until the group disbanded in 2008. During his tenure, Zindle contributed to all major studio releases and remained a consistent member across every lineup.

Following the breakup of Last Conservative, Zindle joined the folk-rock/world-fusion ensemble The Ragbirds, a Michigan-based group known for blending rock, folk, and global influences. According to the band’s official biography, Zindle became a core touring and recording member, contributing guitar, vocals, and instrumental arrangements.

During his time with The Ragbirds Zindle has gone on to create two solo albums- 2017's Hold on With all Your Might and 2022's Now Let Go, produced on the musician's iPad..

In 2025, Zindle moved back to Buffalo, NY and is currently working as a solo artist, playing original songs across the Western New York region.

== Band members ==
=== Final lineup (2004–2008) ===
- T. J. Zindle – guitar, vocals (1998–2008)
- David Julian – guitar, vocals (2004–2008)
- Josh Mullin – bass (2005–2008)
- Tom McCluskey – drums (2003–2008)

=== Former members ===
- Vic Lazar – guitar (2003–2004)
- Mike Zeis – bass (1998–2004)
- Roger Bryan – guitar (1998–2002)
- Jeff Pietrzak – drums (1998–2003)

== Discography ==
=== Studio albums ===
- Unremarkable (1999)
- These In-Between Times (2002)
- On to the Next One (2004)
- Pretty New Things (2006)

=== EPs ===
- My Old Self (2001)
