= Candy Rock =

Studio album by Shonen Knife
- Released: 22 May 2003
- Genre: Pop-punk
- Label: Burning Farm/Elektra

Shonen Knife chronology
Heavy Songs (2002)	Candy Rock (2003)	Genki Shock! (2006)

Professional ratings
Review scores
Source	Rating
Allmusic	1.5/5 stars

Candy Rock is a 2003 album by the Japanese rock group Shonen Knife. It is one of their few albums not to be released in the United States. All of the songs are sung in Japanese.

== Track listing ==
All tracks by Naoko Yamano

1. "Mass Communication Breakdown"
2. "Messy Room"
3. "Wonder Land"
4. "Walrus (Seiuchi)"
5. "Virtual Reality"
6. "Crossword"
7. "Doubts" (or "Mystery") (Na Zo)
8. "Monkey Brand Oolong Tea"

== Personnel ==
- Naoko Yamano – guitar, vocals
- Atsuko Yamano – bass, drums, backing vocals
- Phil Elverum – guitar
- Kyle Field – vocals
- Roman Yumeno – bass guitar, guitar
