= Strawberry Sound =

Studio album by Shonen Knife
- Released: February 19, 2000
- Genre: Pop-punk
- Label: Universal Victor

Shonen Knife chronology
| Happy Hour (1998) | Strawberry Sound (2000) | Heavy Songs (2002) |

Professional ratings
Review scores
| Source | Rating |
|---|---|
| AllMusic | 2/5 stars |
| The Encyclopedia of Popular Music | 3/5 stars |

Strawberry Sound is an album by the female Japanese rock group Shonen Knife, released in 2000. It was their first album without founding member Michie Nakatani. It was released only in Japan.

Rodney Alan Greenblat (who is known for PaRappa the Rapper) created the cover artwork.

== Critical reception ==
AllMusic wrote that the album "starts out in a familiarly lo-fi punk vein, with the buzzsaw guitars and cute, nonsensical lyrics of 'Buggy Bug' defiantly signaling business as usual for the Osaka pop-punk group."

== Track listing ==
All songs written by Naoko Yamano, except "Mosquitoes" by Naoko Yamano/Atsuko Yamano.

1. "Side 1"
2. "Buggy Bug"
3. "Wild Life"
4. "Nya Nya"
5. "Gokiburu" (Cockroach Mannerism)
6. "Super Big Black Bass"
7. "CM Song" (Commercial Message Song)
8. "Side 2"
9. "Punk Rock Star"
10. "Sesame"
11. "Kaiki Game" (Mysterious Game)
12. "Chinese Disco"
13. "Mosquitoes"
14. "Mayonnaise Addiction"
15. "Synthesizer (Bubble Houkai)" (Bubble Collapse)
16. "untitled" ('Side ___' out-take)

== Personnel ==
- Naoko Yamano - guitar, vocals
- Atsuko Yamano - bass, drums, backing vocals
