= Delta 5 =

English post-punk band (1979–1981)

- Origin: Leeds, West Yorkshire, England
- Genres: Post-punk, new wave
- Years active: 1979–1981
- Labels: Rough Trade; Pre; Charisma
- Past members: Julz Sale; Ros Allen; Bethan Peters; Kelvin Knight; Alan Riggs; Graeme High

Delta 5 was an English post-punk band from Leeds. They released several singles with Rough Trade Records and one studio album with Charisma Records imprint Pre.

== Career ==
Delta 5 was formed from the same art school scene at Leeds University as Gang of Four and The Mekons. The original members of Delta 5, Julz Sale (vocals/guitar), Ros Allen (bass) and Bethan Peters (bass), formed the band "on a lark", but soon became a part of the thriving Leeds post-punk scene, and later added Kelvin Knight on drums and Alan Riggs on guitar, both of whom also played in Dead Beats. Combining feminist politics with a two-bass funk-punk sound (much in the style of another, more famous Leeds band, Gang of Four), they released their debut single "Mind Your Own Business" in 1979.

The members of Delta 5 were important figures in the Rock Against Racism movement and were the subject of a highly publicised assault at the hands of a right-wing group affiliated with rival movement Rock Against Communism.

After the release of second single "You", the band went on a successful tour of the United States, and soon thereafter left Rough Trade for Charisma Records imprint Pre. They recorded their debut album See the Whirl, which some critics thought too glossy with "tacked-on" sounding horns and keyboards added into their sound. Due to the commercial disappointment of the album, the group disbanded.

== Post-breakup ==
Apart from bassist Bethan Peters playing on Fun Boy Three's second album Waiting and performing with them live to support its release, the members of Delta 5 were mostly musically inactive after the group's breakup. Meanwhile, Delta 5's recorded output was finding a posthumous fan base internationally. The band Shonen Knife recorded a cover version of "You" with Japanese lyrics and renamed "Saboten" ("Cactus") for their 1982 debut album Minna Tanoshiku.

In 2006, Kill Rock Stars released a compilation of early Delta 5 material titled Singles & Sessions 1979-1981, capitalising on the re-emerging popularity of post-punk bands such as Gang of Four and Wire. The set included unreleased material, along with BBC radio sessions and live cuts.

Delta 5 drummer Kelvin Knight died on 2 December 2015 from liver and kidney failure at the age of 56. Singer and guitarist Julz Sale died from cancer in Thailand on 20 September 2021.

== Legacy ==
"Mind Your Own Business" is the band's best-known song, having been covered by Chicks on Speed, Le Shok, R. Stevie Moore, Pigface, Dum Dum Girls, and Mike D 5D. It featured in episode 5 of the series Sex Education in January 2019, an episode of the 2020 BBC TV series The A Word, and in an Apple commercial in 2021. The song was also featured in Queen of Chess, a 2026 American documentary film which explores the life and career of Hungarian chess grandmaster Judit Polgár.

Julz Sale's name is one of those featured on the sculpture Ribbons, unveiled in 2024.

== Discography ==
=== Albums ===
- See the Whirl (1981)

=== Compilation albums ===
- Singles & Sessions 1979-1981 (Kill Rock Stars; CD; (2006)

=== Singles ===
- "Mind Your Own Business" / "Now That You've Gone" (1979, Rough Trade Records)
- "Anticipation" / "You" (1980, Rough Trade Records)
- "Try" / "Colour" (1980, Rough Trade Records)
- "Shadow" / "Leaving" (1981)
- 6 (12" EP, first three singles) (1981, Base Records)
- "Powerlines" / "The Heart Is a Lonely Hunter" (1982)
