= Free Time (album) =

Studio album by Shonen Knife
- Released: January 2010 (Japan)
- Recorded: 2009
- Genre: Pop-punk
- Label: P-Vine-Good Charamel-Damnably
- Producer: Naoko Yamano and Atsushi Shibata

Shonen Knife chronology
Super Group (2008)	Free Time (2010)	Osaka Ramones (2011)

Alternative cover
- Europe release cover art, designed by American band American Werewolf Academy

Free Time is an album by the Japanese rock trio Shonen Knife. It was released in Japan on January 6, 2010. An English version was released in the United States on November 9, 2010, by Good Charamel Records. It was released in Europe on July 11, 2011, with different cover art.

== Track listing ==
1. "Perfect Freedom"
2. "Rock 'n' Roll Cake"
3. "Economic Crisis"
4. "Do You Happen to Know"
5. "Capybara"
6. "An Old Stationary Shop"
7. "Monster Jellyfish"
8. "P.Y.O."
9. "Love Song"
10. "Star"

The English version CD, for the United States and Europe, has English versions of all the above songs, plus two extra songs:

11. "Rock N Roll Cake" (Alternative Version)
12. "Capybara" (Techno Version)

== Personnel ==
- Naoko Yamano - guitar, vocals
- Ritsuko Taneda - bass, backing vocals
- Etsuko Nakanishi - drums, backing vocals
