= Singles & Sessions 1979–1981 =

Compilation album by Delta 5
- Released: 26 January 2006
- Recorded: 1979–1981
- Genre: Post-punk, new wave
- Length: 43:21
- Label: Kill Rock Stars
- Producer: Delta 5, Rob Warr, Phill Brown, Terry Hammer

Delta 5 chronology
See the Whirl (1981)	Singles & Sessions 1979–1981 (2006)

Professional ratings
Review scores
Source	Rating
AllMusic	4.5/5 stars
Pitchfork	8.3/10
Stylus Magazine	A-

Singles & Sessions 1979–1981 is a compilation of previously hard-to-find or unreleased material from Leeds post-punk band Delta 5. It contains the 3 Rough Trade singles "Mind Your Own Business", "Anticipation" and "Try" with their B-sides, 7 Peel and other BBC Radio sessions, and 3 live cuts. Later releases include 3 additional remixes of "Mind Your Own Business" produced in 2009.

== Track listing ==
All tracks composed by Delta 5

No.	Title	Length
1.	"Mind Your Own Business"	3:13
2.	"Now That You've Gone"	4:13
3.	"Anticipation"	2:11
4.	"You"	3:51
5.	"Try"	3:05
6.	"Colour"	2:03
7.	"Delta 5"	1:52
8.	"Make Up"	2:55
9.	"Triangle"	3:20
10.	"Innocenti"	2:04
11.	"Train Song"	3:01
12.	"Final Scene"	3:02
13.	"Singing the Praises"	2:59
14.	"Shadow"	2:40
15.	"Circuit"	1:57
16.	"Journey"	3:00

Reissue additional tracks
No.	Title	Length
17.	"Mind Your Own Business" (Man Ray Mix)	5:33
18.	"Mind Your Own Business" (featuring Monnei Lamar - Remix)	3:30
19.	"Mind Your Own Business" (Deerhoof's Remix)	2:45

- Tracks 1 and 2 from Rough Trade single RT 031, September 1979, recorded at The Workhouse, London, produced by Delta 5 and Rob Warr
- Tracks 3 and 4 from Rough Trade single RT 041, February 1980, recorded at Foel Studios, Wales, produced by Delta 5
- Tracks 5 and 6 from Rough Trade single RT 061, September 1980, recorded at The Point, London, produced by Delta 5 and Phil Brown
- Tracks 7 and 8 from BBC John Peel session February 4, 1980
- Track 9 from BBC John Peel session September 2, 1980
- Tracks 10–13 from BBC Richard Skinner session July 16, 1981
- Tracks 14–16 live at Berkeley Square, Berkeley, California on September 27, 1980, produced, recorded and mixed by Terry Hammer

== Personnel ==
Delta 5

- Julz Sale - vocals
- Alan Riggs - guitar
- Bethan Peters - bass, vocals
- Ros Allen - bass, vocals
- Kelvin Knight - drums

with:

- Andrew Marson, Chris Kane, Jeff Evans - horns on "Try" and "Colour"
