= DMBQ =

Japanese rock band

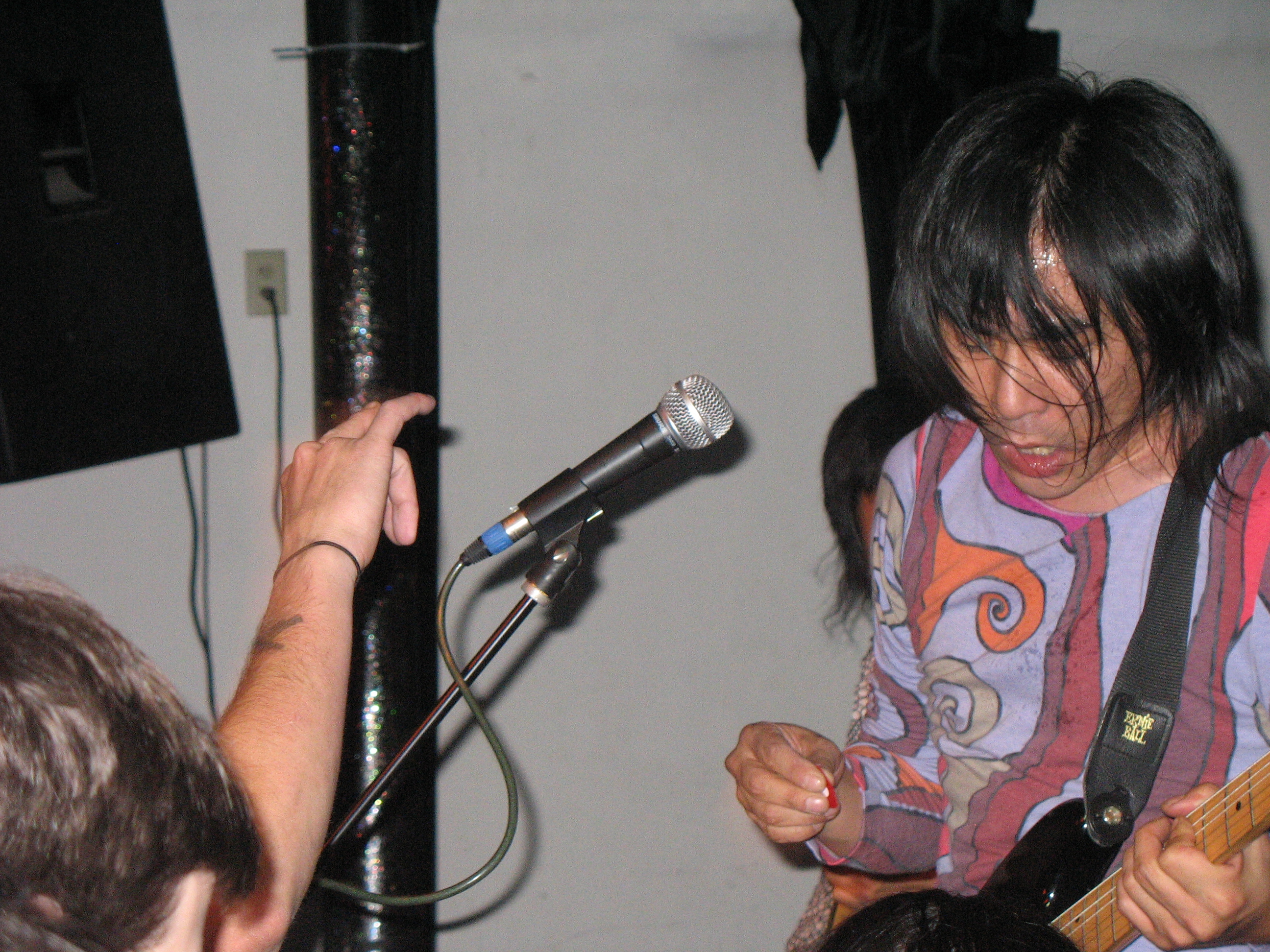
- Shinji Masuko of DMBQ at AS220 in Providence, Rhode Island, 2008

Background information
- Origin: Tokyo, Japan
- Genres: Hard rock; rock and roll
- Years active: 1989 – present
- Label: God?/Drag City
- Members: Shinji Masuko; Shinji Wada; Maki
- Past members: Yuka Yoshimura; Mana Nishiura; Toru Mastui; Ryuichi Watanabe
- Website: http://www.dmbq.net/

DMBQ is a Japanese rock band from Tokyo, whose name stands for Dynamite Masters Blues Quartet. They are influenced by British and American rock music of the early 1970s, especially bands like The Jimi Hendrix Experience, Deep Purple, and Led Zeppelin.

== History ==
DMBQ was formed in Hokkaido in 1989. The founding members were Shinji Masuko (vocals/guitar), Ryuuichi Watanabe (bass), and Yuka Yoshimura (drums). Shinji Masuko is a well-known journalist in Japan who has regular columns in several music, pornography and subculture magazines. He is a younger brother of Naozumi Masuko, who is a member of Dohatsuten. Yuka Yoshimura was also a member of OOIOO and Hatsuiku Status.

DMBQ began performing in Tokyo in early 1990 and quickly gained notoriety for their psychedelic live performances. In 1995, their debut album Dynamite Masters Blues Quartet was released. In 1997, Toru Matsui (guitar) became a member of the band. In 1999, they contracted with PARCO/Columbia and made their major label debut. In 2002, they contracted with avex trax.

In June 2004, they were supposed to start their first American tour, but Yoshimura left the band just before embarking, and Mana Nishiura (also a member of Shonen Knife) became her replacement. In 2005, they contracted with the American label Estrus/Touch and Go, and toured in the United States.

On November 4, 2005, while driving to a show at New York City's Club Exit, Mana Nishiura died when another vehicle crossed lanes and struck the band's van in southern New Jersey. After recovering from their injuries, DMBQ decided to go back to the US (west coast only) for another mini-tour. In February, 2006, Shinji Wada formally assumed DMBQ's drummer duties.

By 2014, Toru Matsui and Ryuichi Watanabe left DMBQ and Maki (formerly of OOIOO) assumed bass duties. They have continued as a three-piece since then. In February 2018, they released their first new album in 13 years, Keeenly, in Japan. After a Japan tour in March 2018 with Ty Segall and the Freedom band, Segall re-released Keeenly on his own label in the United States. Ty Segall said, "There is no band like DMBQ. They are unique destroyers of sound, and lovers of sonic beauty, existing in the places between. Masters of harsh tone and psychotic rhythm. Keeenly is an alien planet type record, evoking images of landscapes and weather patterns found in other galaxies. Purple wind and green fire.”

=== Related bands ===
Former members of DMBQ have formed the bands Tompei & Bishop and Hydro-Guru. Shinji Masuko has also been a member of Boredoms since 2004 and has also served as an instrument designer and live sound technician for Yamantaka Eye. Masuko also formed a solo project called Moan.

== Personnel ==
=== Current members ===
- Shinji Masuko - guitar
- Shinji Wada - drums (formerly of King Brothers BROTHERS)
- Maki - bass (formerly of OOIOO)

=== Former members ===
- Mana Nishiura - drums
- Yuka Yoshimura - drums (formerly of OOIOO, currently in Catsuomaticdeath and Metalchicks)
- Toru Matsui - guitar
- Ryuichi Watanabe - bass

== Partial discography ==
Year	Title	Label + catalog number
1995	Dynamite Masters Blues Quartet	Less Than TV
1996	EXP	Less Than TV ch-24
1997	COG
1998	Fable of Thinnerlemon	Nanophonica MKCL-2002
1999	I Know Your Sweet
2000	Jinni
2001	Annular Music
2001	Resonated (remix album)
2002	Phalanges
2003	The Cold One
2004	Esoteric Black Hair	Fake Chapter Records
2004	DMBQ vs. Hysteric Glamour
2004	Hercules Hits (DMBQ Best)
2004	You Must Be Psychic (promo one-song EP from 2004 tour)	released by the band as a CDR
2005	The Essential Sounds from the Far East	Estrus Records
2018	Keeenly	Tsukumogami Co. Ltd. on CD in Japan; Drag City/God? on 2xLP in the US
