= Hiroshi Nishio =

Japanese film director (born 1974)

Hiroshi Nishio (Japanese: 西尾 孔志, Hepburn: Nishio Hiroshi) is a Japanese film director, animator, and writer born in 1974 in Osaka, where he is currently based. Nishio started his career as an animator on anime including "Moldiver" and the TV series Sosei kishi Gaiasu. As a teenager, he started working on sets of movies by Japanese director Kinji Fukasaku. He moved on from animation, starting off with short films, before making his first feature film National Anthem—a horror film—in 2003. His next movie was the surreal Ochon-chan: Pussy's Adventures in Love and Revolution (Ochonchan no ai to bōken to kakumei おちょんちゃんの愛と冒険と革命) in 2005. Ochon-chan was picked for Osaka's CO_{2} Film Festival, and then was one of two movies selected from that to feature at the 2005 Raindance Film Festival in London.

His most recent film Hakodate Coffee was shot in Hokkaido, Japan, and was based on the manga of the same name.

His recent movies are often generally quirky dramas, with a touch of comedy, set in rural Japan. Nishio won the Osaka Film Festival New Director's Award in 2013, for Souru furawâ torein. His most recent movie is the human comedy drama, Shining Star Kuzu.

== Filmography ==
- Shining Star Kuzu
- Hakodate Coffee
- Souru furawâ torein
- National Anthem (film)
- Ochon-chan: Pussy's Adventures in Love and Revolution
