= Hakodate Coffee =

- 函館珈琲
- Directed by: Hiroshi Nishio
- Screenplay by: Nanoha Ito
- Produced by: Sanshiro Kobayashi Atsushi Obinata
- Starring: Yōko Natsuki; Reiko Kataoka; Masaya Kikawada
- Release date: 2016
- Country: Japan
- Language: Japanese

Hakodate Coffee (函館珈琲) is a Japanese drama film, released in 2016, by director Hiroshi Nishio. The film is centred around the drama of the people in a western style apartment block called Hisuikan, in Hokodate, Hokkaido Japan. It was directed by Hiroshi Nishio, written by Nanoha Ito and produced by Sanshiro Kobayashi, Atsushi Obinata. The film was featured as part of the Osaka Asian Film Festival, and the Nippon Connection Festival

== Plot ==
Set in Hakodate, the film revolves around the apartment block Hisuikan ("Jade Museum"), and its occupants.

Building owner Ogiwara Toshiko rents rooms as studios and dwellings to young people who follow their dreams. There is only one condition to become an inhabitant: Toshiko must consider them "a person suitable for the Jade Museum". Many artists live there and fulfill their work; Kazuto Horikuchi is a decorative glass craftworker, Kotaro Aizawa a teddy bear maker, and Sawako Fujimura a professional photographer using pinhole cameras. Each previously searched for "indispensable things in life" and were in frustrating loneliness.

One day in summer, Eiji Hiyama arrives from Tokyo, instead of the expected furniture craftsman Yabushita who was supposed to come to the Jade Museum. However, the coffee Toshiko brews between work has a soft aroma that reached the heart.

Aizawa thinks of his distant hometown and commits to each teddy bear the courage to fight loneliness. Sawa deals with his social phobia through his pinhole camera photography. Hikiyama starts to run a second-hand bookstore to resell books online. His secret is that he is a novelist who suffers without being able to write his own works since his novel Incomplete Moon at a young age. He is angry and impatient with himself for not being able to produce anything. However, the coffee Toshiko brews between work has a soft aroma that reaches his heart. The soft smell of coffee tickles the tip of the nose, and interaction between the various souls begin.

== Cast ==
- Yōko Natsuki
- Reiko Kataoka
- Masaya Kikawada
