= Mana Nishiura =

Japanese musician (1971–2005)

Mana Nishiura 西浦 真奈
- Born: 西浦 真奈 (Nishiura Mana); October 11, 1971; Hiroshima, Japan
- Died: November 4, 2005 (aged 34) New Jersey, United States
- Occupation: Musician
- Years active: 1993–2005

Mana "China" Nishiura (西浦 真奈, Nishiura Mana; October 11, 1971 – November 4, 2005) was a drummer for Japanese alternative rock bands Shonen Knife and DMBQ. She died in a car accident in 2005.

== Biography ==
=== Life and career ===
Nishiura was born in Hiroshima, Japan. She was a well-known session drummer, and played with other bands during her career; these bands include Rashinban, Droop, Jesus Fever, ya to i, jimama, Teem, Music Start Against Young Assault and Cel. She joined Japanese alternative rock band Shonen Knife in 2001 and played with them until 2004.

=== Death ===
On November 4, 2005, Nishiura was touring the United States with her band DMBQ. Their van was involved in a highway accident near the Delaware Memorial Bridge of Carneys Point Township, Salem County, New Jersey. At the junction between US 40 and I-295, another vehicle crossed lanes and struck the van from behind, which then went down an embankment and rolled over. Nishiura was ejected from the vehicle and pronounced dead at the scene. The other members of DMBQ were hospitalised and the accident also severely injured the band's manager, although they all survived.
