= National Anthem (2003 film) =

National Anthem is a 2003 Japanese horror film directed by Osaka-based film maker, Hiroshi Nishio. The film stars Shôko Kojima, Junji Wada, Mika Tsuzumi, Daisuke Watanabe, Sachie Mishima. The film featured in the Kansai:l’autre Cinéma Japonais Festival in Montreal, in 2011.

== Synopsis ==
One morning after a typhoon, an old bomb from World War II is discovered in a construction site. The following day, one of the workers of the shipyard commits suicide by throwing himself on the road. From then on, inexplicable crimes succeed each other. The films narrative, carried by a non-rhythm at once languid and repetitive until a relative hypnotic power. The Japan in the movie is contaminated and depopulated Japan, until the final of a punk-amazon revolt under the fire of the helicopters (and suddenly, in a simple use of the soundtrack, Propellers and submachine guns, minimalism shifts into the war film).
