= Kuchizuke (Buck-Tick song) =

- Regular edition cover

Single by Buck-Tick

from the album Razzle Dazzle
- Released: September 1, 2010
- Recorded: April – June 2010
- Genre: Dark wave
- Length: 8:16
- Label: Ariola Japan
- Songwriters: Sakurai, Imai, Hoshino
- Producer: Buck-Tick

Buck-Tick singles chronology
"Dokudanjou Beauty" (2010)	"Kuchizuke" (2010)	"Elise no tame ni" (2012)

"Kuchizuke" (くちづけ; "Kiss") is the thirtieth single by the Japanese rock band Buck-Tick, released on September 1, 2010. The song was used as the first opening theme of the anime Shiki.

== Track listing ==
All lyrics are written by Atsushi Sakurai.

No.	Title	Music	Length
1.	"Kuchizuke" (くちづけ)	Imai	2:47
2.	"Yōgetsu -Yōgetsu-" (妖月 -ようげつ-)	Hoshino	4:49
Total length:			8:16

Shiki special edition
No.	Title	Music	Length
1.	"Kuchizuke" (TV size)	Imai	1:30

DVD
No.	Title	Length
1.	"Kuchizuke" (Music video)
2.	"Kuchizuke" (Making-of)

== Charts ==
The single peaked at the 7th position on the Oricon Singles Chart.

== Personnel ==
- Atsushi Sakurai – singing
- Hisashi Imai – lead guitar
- Hidehiko "Hide" Hoshino – rhythm guitar
- Yutaka "U-ta" Higuchi – bass
- Yagami Toll – drums
