= Yama-no Attchan =

Studio album by Shonen Knife
- Released: 1984
- Recorded: 19 February – 22 April 1984
- Genre: Pop punk, post punk
- Producer: Shonen Knife and Taku Ishii

Shonen Knife chronology
Burning Farm (1983)	Yama-no Attchan (1984)	Pretty Little Baka Guy (1986)

Professional ratings
Review scores
Source	Rating
Allmusic	4.5/5 stars

Yama no Att-chan. (山のアッちゃん。; "Att-chan of the Mountain(s).") is the second album released by Japanese pop punk band Shonen Knife and is almost exclusively in Japanese. The album was named after Atsuko, their drummer, the honorific "-chan" being added. The title thus functions as a pun, since the drummer's name, when rendered in the traditional Japanese style, is Yamano Atsuko.

The original Japanese 8" vinyl (Zero Records 0-0584) includes 10 songs. The CD reissue bonus tracks are either "Flying Jelly Attack" and "Insect Collector" live (Oglio Records, US), or "Secret Dance" and "Flying Saucer Attack" (MCA Victor, Japan).

The reissue version of this album does not feature the original version of "Dalí's Sunflower" – it contains a more recently recorded version. The 1990 compilation album Shonen Knife features the entire album with the original version of "Dali's Sunflower" as well as the album Burning Farm.

== Track listing ==
1. "An Angel Has Come"
2. "Cycling Is Fun"
3. "Elmar Elevator"
4. "Banana Leaf"
5. "Chinese Song"
6. "Flying Jelly Attack"
7. "Cannibal Papaya"
8. "Dalí's Sunflower"
9. "Insect Collector"
10. "Bye Bye"

== Personnel ==
- Naoko Yamano – guitar, vocals
- Michie Nakatani – bass, keyboards, vocals
- Atsuko Yamano – drums, backing vocals
