= See the Whirl =

Studio album by Delta 5
- Released: 1981
- Genre: Post-punk, new wave
- Label: PRE Records - PREX 6
- Producer: Adam Kidron

Delta 5 chronology
See the Whirl (1981)	Singles & Sessions 1979–1981 (2006)

Professional ratings
Review scores
Source	Rating
Smash Hits	8/10

See the Whirl (styled on the cover and original release labels as See the Whirl' - that is, with an apostrophe at the end to signify the pun of the title) is the first and only album by Leeds post-punk band Delta 5.

== Track listing ==
All tracks composed by Delta 5; except where indicated

Side A

1. "Innocenti" - 02:03
2. "Final Scene" - 02:42
3. "Circuit" - 01:59
4. "Open Life" - 03:39
5. "Trail" - 02:57
6. "Shadow" - 02:30
7. "Delta 5" - 02:05
8. "Anticipation" - 02:14

Side B

1. "Journey" - 02:54
2. "Make Up" (Delta 5, Jon Langford) - 02:51
3. "Triangle" - 03:34
4. "Waiting" - 02:29
5. "Telephone" - 04:23
6. "Different Fur" - 02:40

== Personnel ==
Delta 5

- Bethan Peters - bass, vocals
- Ros Allen - bass, vocals
- Kelvin Knight - drums, percussion
- Alan Riggs - guitar, vocals
- Julz Sale - vocals, guitar

with:

- Michael McEvoy - piano, horn arrangements
- Melv Jefferson - backing vocals, syndrums
- B.J. Cole - pedal steel guitar on "Triangle"
- John Sidwell, Steve Bishop, Steve Sidwell - horns

Technical

- Mike Stand, Tim Summerhayes - engineer
- John Rule - tape operator
- Joe Lyons - photographer

Some copies of the original LP came with a postcard featuring an image of the group from which the silhouettes on the cover were taken.
