= Ochon-chan: Pussy's Adventures in Love and Revolution =

Ochon-chan: Pussy's Adventures in Love and Revolution (おちょんちゃんの愛と冒険と革命, Ochon-chan no ai to bōken to kakumei) is a Japanese film from 2005. A surreal, experimental film, it was one of the early works of Osaka-based filmmaker, Hiroshi Nishio. The film was featured both in the Raindance Film Festival Programme in 2005 in London, as well as the Osaka CO2 festival.

== Plotline ==
Hana, traumatized by a sexual assault, seeks advice from her doctor, who advise her to write letters to her genitalia. He advises her to establish a connection between her heart and her loins.

== Cast ==
- Yoko Ueda
- Wataru Kawaguchi
- Chiemi Minamiyama.
