= Aquirax Uno =

Japanese artist

Aquirax Uno, is the alias of Akira Uno (宇野 亜喜良, Uno Akira) (born March 13, 1934), a Japanese graphic artist, illustrator and painter. His work is characterized by fantasized portraiture, sensuous line flow, flamboyant (and occasionally grotesque) eroticism, and frequent use of collage and bright colors. Uno was prominently involved with the Japanese underground art of the 1960s–1970s, and is particularly notable for his collaborations with Shūji Terayama and his experimental theater Tenjō Sajiki.

Uno did two album covers for the rock band Buck-Tick.

Uno did an art installation for the historic Dōgo Onsen in 2019.

Uno's illustrated retelling of Cinderella was exhibited in the Rokko International Musical Box Museum at the annual Rokko Meets Art modern art festival atop Mount Rokkō in 2019.

== Name ==
The pseudonym Aquirax was chosen as an exotic French-style spelling of his Japanese name Akira. He has also mentioned that he has chosen "Aquirax" so he was able to write a longer signature on his works.

== Works ==
- Aquirax Uno posters 1959–1975, published by Blues Interactions, Inc (2003), ISBN 4-86020-071-3.
- Cover art for Buck-Tick's Razzle Dazzle, Ariola Japan, (2010)
- The World of Aquirax Uno's Fantasy Illustrations, published by PIE Books (2016), ISBN 9784756247766.

== See also ==
- Tadanori Yokoo
