= 712 (album) =

Studio album by Shonen Knife
- Released: 1991
- Genre: Pop punk, post punk, indie rock
- Length: 39:58
- Label: Gasatanka/Rockville

Shonen Knife chronology
Shonen Knife (1990)	712 (1991)	Let's Knife (1992)

Professional ratings
Review scores
Source	Rating
AllMusic	4.5/5 stars
The Encyclopedia of Popular Music	3/5 stars
MusicHound Rock: The Essential Album Guide	2/5 stars

712 is a 1991 album by the Japanese rock trio Shonen Knife. Using goroawase (語呂合わせ; "phonetic matching"), "712" can be read as "na-i-fu" (ナイフ), the Japanese imported word for "knife".

The Japanese re-issue of this CD does not include the song "Baggs" (co-written with members of L7), instead featuring a new song "Cooking Story".

== Critical reception ==
AllMusic called the album "a recommended starting point for those wishing to indulge themselves in some whimsical and thoroughly unpretentious rock & roll." The New York Times wrote that "while [the band's] playing style can be charmingly imprecise -- harmonies that veer drastically out of key, missed drum cues -- its primitivism never seems contrived." Spin recommended the album, writing that Shonen Knife "triumph when they insert the referents of pop stardom into their own inimitable universe."

== Track listing ==
No.	Title	Writer(s)	Length
1.	"Shonen Knife"	Naoko Yamano	3:51
2.	"Lazybone"	N. Yamano	2:16
3.	"Diet Run"	N. Yamano	3:12
4.	"Blue Oyster Cult"	N. Yamano	2:24
5.	"Rain"	Lennon, McCartney	2:57
6.	"The Luck of the Irish"	Lennon, Ono	2:54
7.	"My Favorite Town (Osaka)"	N. Yamano	2:57
8.	"Faith Healer"	Bill Goffrier, Steve Michner, Jeff Oliphart, Gary Waleik	3:10
9.	"Redd Kross"	N. Yamano	2:36
10.	"White Flag"	Michie Nakatani, Steve Davis	1:05
11.	"Superstar"	N. Yamano	2:36
12.	"Expo '90"	Davis, Nakatani	2:05
13.	"Fruit Loop Dreams"	N. Yamano, Pat Fear	1:53
14.	"The Moon World"	Nakatani	2:42

Bonus track on original US release
No.	Title	Writer(s)	Length
15.	"Baggs"	Nakatani, N. Yamano	3:50

Bonus tracks on original Japanese re-release
No.	Title	Length
15.	"Cooking Story"

Bonus tracks on original US rerelease
No.	Title	Length
15.	"Baggs"
16.	"Lazybone" (Live)
17.	"Blue Oyster Cult" (Live)

== Personnel ==
=== Shonen Knife ===
- Naoko Yamano: vocals, guitars
- Michie Nakatani: bass guitar, vocals
- Atsuko Yamano: drums

=== Additional personnel ===
- Jeff McDonald: vocals
- Pat Fear, Atsushi Shibata: guitars
- Noboru Yamada: saxophone
- Dave Landry, Steve McDonald, Steve Davis: bass guitar
- Victor Indrizzo: drums, percussion
