= LAZYgunsBRISKY =

Japanese rock band

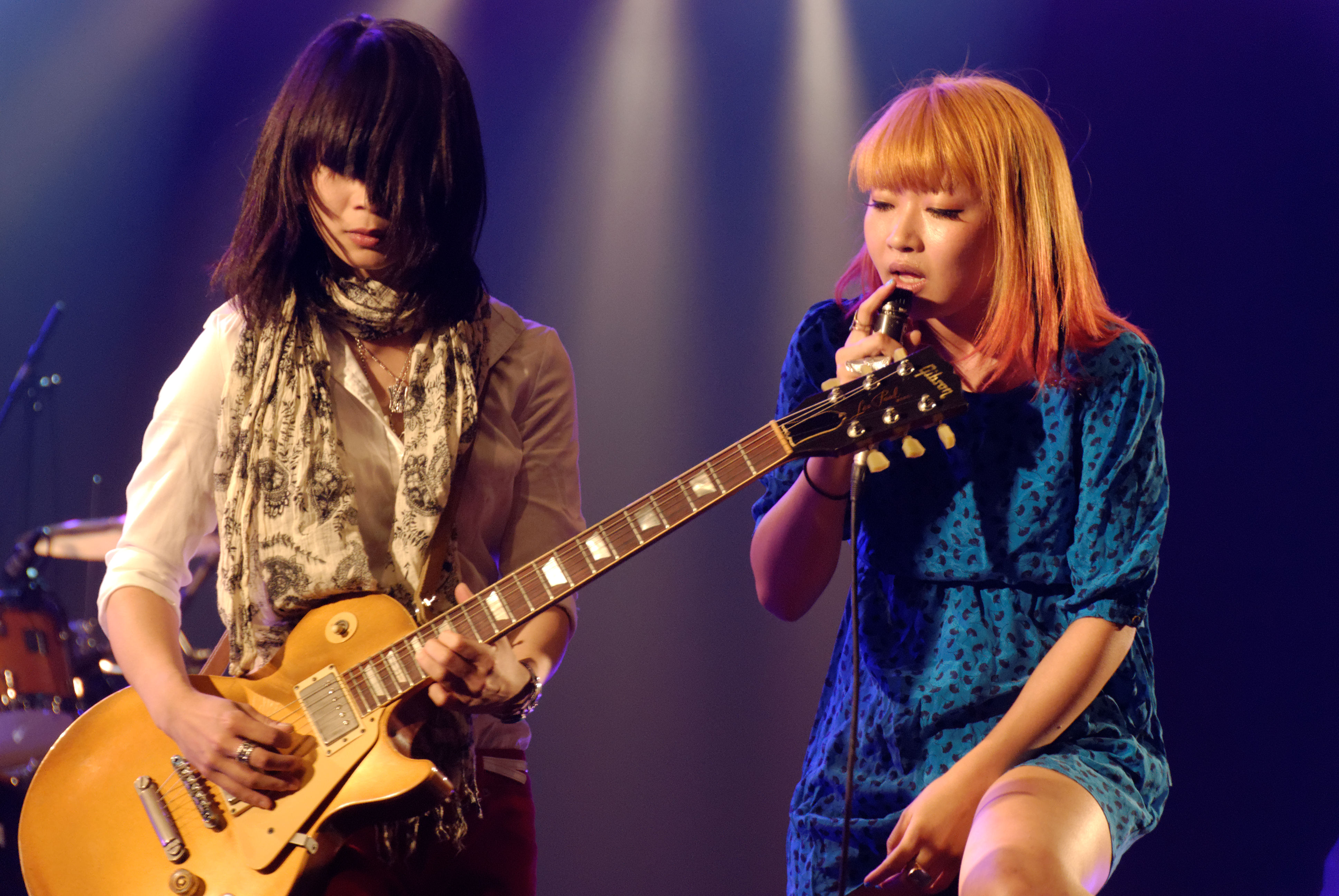
- Izumi and Lucy performing at Japan Expo, 2011.

Background information
- Origin: Tokyo, Japan
- Genre: Garage rock
- Years active: 2006–2012; 2015–2022; 2026
- Labels: July, FlyingStar, BabeStar, MOVEment, Sexy Stones, Blue Mask, Age Global
- Past members: Lucy; Azu; Moe; Yuko; Izumi

Lazygunsbrisky (stylized as LAZYgunsBRISKY) are an all-female Japanese rock band that was active from 2006 to 2012, from 2015 to 2022, and again from 2026. The group was influenced by western 1960s and 1970s rock acts such as The Beatles and Led Zeppelin.

== Career ==
Lazygunsbrisky was founded in 2006 by high school classmates, lead singer Lucy, guitarist Izumi, bassist Azu and drummer Moe, after they graduated high school. They released a demo titled "The Trip" in July 2007. Their first album was released in April 2008 by July Records. It was entitled Quixotic and produced by Motoaki Fukanuma. That same year they released another album entitled Catching! on Babestar, produced by Kenichi Asai of Blankey Jet City.

In 2009, they took part in the Arabiki Rock Festival 2009 and released mini-album 26times on FlyingStar. Performing a surprise concert at the Fuji Rock Festival 2009 which made the news. Their popularity was also seen out of Japan. Not only was 26times released in America by Good Charamel Records, established by Goo Goo Dolls bassist Robby Takac, but Catching! was sold in Europe by German label Spark & Shine.

Lazygunsbrisky went on a European tour in 2010, which took them to France and Switzerland. That same year, Lucy provided the chorus to the album version of Buck-Tick's song "Dokudanjō Beauty". In December, they established their own label, G.O.D. Records, and released a three-track CD called "Childhood".

In 2011 they released their new album Lazygunsbrisky by Movement Records which is affiliated with May Sexy Stones Records. It was also released in Europe by label Bishi Bishi. They also went on their second European tour, which included performing at that year's Japan Expo. After returning to Japan the band disbanded on May 12, 2012. Lead singer Lucy embarked on a solo career and joined BORZOIQ, guitarist Izumi joined the all-female band Sugar'N'Spice, and bassist Azu supported the all-female rock band Cyntia before becoming a full member.

In 2015, Lazygunsbrisky reunited and held their first concert at Shibuya Tsutaya O-Crest on May 12. Izumi left the group after a June 14, 2016 concert. She was officially replaced by Yuko on October 28.

In November 2021, Lazygunsbrisky announced that they would be suspending activities on January 30, 2022 due to the progression of Lucy's chronic heart condition.

== Members ==
- Lucy – lead vocals (2006–2012, 2015–2022)
- Azu – bass, backing vocals (2006–2012, 2015–2022)
- Moe – drums (2006–2012, 2015–2022)
- Yuko – guitar (2016–2022)

Former members

- Izumi – guitar (2006–2012, 2015–2016)

== Discography ==
=== Studio albums ===
- Quixotic (April 2008)
- Lazygunsbrisky (May 2011)

=== Mini-albums ===
- Catching! (December 2008)
- 26times (July 2009)
- No Buts (March 2017)
- Riot Bulb (June 2019)

=== Singles ===
- "Childhood" (2010)
- "Roll Out" (2016)
- "Kiss Me" (2018)
- "Hello, Again!" (2018)
- "Dive" (2020)
- "Stand Up!" (2020)
- "Dramatic" (2020)
