= Ritsuko Taneda =

Japanese musician

Litsuko 種子田 律子
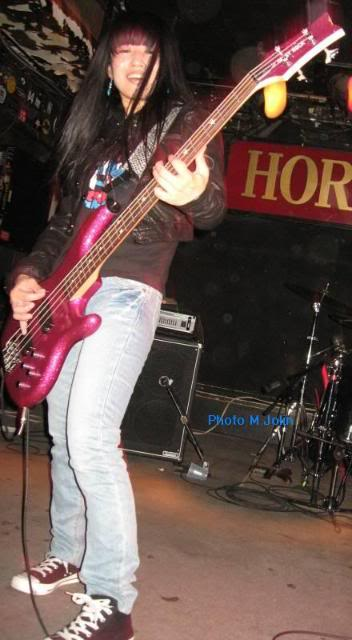
- Taneda performing with Shonen Knife in October 2011 during the Osaka Ramones tour

Background information
- Also known as: Litsuko
- Genres: Pop-punk; alternative rock; indie pop
- Instruments: Bass; guitar; vocals
- Years active: 2001–present
- Member of: mophing people
- Formerly of: Shonen Knife
- Website: lit.link/en/mophingpeople

Ritsuko Taneda (種子田 律子, Taneda Ritsuko) is a Japanese musician, best known as the bass guitarist and rhythm guitarist for the pop punk band Shonen Knife from 2006 to 2016. Before joining Shonen Knife, she was a guitarist and vocalist for the J-Pop groups Keihan Girl and Denki Candy.

== Selected discography ==
With Keihan Girl:

- Keihan Rock (2002)
- Goodbye Thunderbird (2003)

With Denki Candy:

- Denki Candy (2006)
- Denki Shock (2007)

With Shonen Knife:

- Super Group (2008)
- Free Time (2010)
- Osaka Ramones (2011)
- Pop Tune (2012)
- Overdrive (2014)

With mophing people:

- alternative e.p (2022)
- mppp (2023)
- alternative e.p2(2024)
