= Dokudanjou Beauty =

"Dokudanjou Beauty (独壇場Beauty)"
- Regular edition cover

Single by Buck-Tick

from the album Razzle Dazzle
- Released: March 24, 2010
- Recorded: August 2009
- Genre: Rock
- Length: 13:24
- Label: Ariola Japan
- Songwriter(s): Hisashi Imai
- Producer(s): Buck-Tick

Buck-Tick singles chronology
"Galaxy" (2008)	"Dokudanjou Beauty (独壇場Beauty)" (2010)	"Kuchizuke" (2010)

"Dokudanjou Beauty" (独壇場Beauty) (English: Incomparable Beauty) is the twenty-ninth single by the Japanese rock band Buck-Tick, released on March 24, 2010. It placed 7th on Oricon's weekly chart.

== Track listing ==
No.	Title	Lyrics	Music	Length
1.	"Dokudanjou Beauty" (独壇場Beauty)	Hisashi Imai	Hisashi Imai	4:31
2.	"Voo Doo"	Atsushi Sakurai	Hidehiko Hoshino	3:38
3.	"Tenshi wa dareda (Live Ver.)" (天使は誰だ)	Hisashi Imai	Hisashi Imai	5:15
Total length:				13:24

== Musicians ==
- Atsushi Sakurai - Voice
- Hisashi Imai - Guitar
- Hidehiko Hoshino - Guitar
- Yutaka Higuchi - Bass
- Toll Yagami - Drums
- Kazutoshi Yokoyama - keyboard
