= Soul Flower Train =

2013 Japanese film

Soul Flower Train (ソウル・フラワー・トレイン, Souru furawā torein) is a 2013 release Japanese drama movie starring Marin, Mitsuru Hirata Kensuke Owada and Taro Suruga. Written by Robin Nishi from the manga and directed by Hiroshi Nishio. The film was chosen for the Raindance Film Festival, and won its director, Hiroshi Nishio, the best new director award at the Osaka Film Festival in 2013.

== Plot ==
Amamoto (Mitsuru Hirata) is a recently retired Town Hall bureaucrat, who has not seen his daughter in many years. Following his retirement, he decides to go to Osaka to see her. Equipped only with a photo of her as a child, he meets random interesting people and encounters as part of his efforts. The film examines the strength of bonds in family, even in strained circumstances, as well as the bonds that can form with strangers.

== Cast ==
- Marin
- Mitsuru Hirata
- Kensuke Owada
- Taro Suruga
