= The Birds & the B-Sides =

Shonen Knife

Compilation album by Shonen Knife
- Released: 1996
- Genre: Pop-punk
- Label: Virgin Records

Professional ratings
Review scores
Source	Rating
Allmusic	link

The Birds & The B-Sides is a collection of B-sides, cover versions, live releases and variants released by Shonen Knife.

== Track listing ==
All songs written by Naoko Yamano, except where noted.

1. "(Love Is Like a) Heat Wave" (Brian Holland, Lamont Dozier, Eddie Holland)
2. "Gomi Day" (Michie Nakatani)
3. "Top of the World" (John Bettis, Richard Carpenter)
4. "Ice Cream City" [Live] (Nakatani)
5. "Paradise" (Phil Spector, Harry Nilsson, Gil Garfield, Perry Botkin Jr)
6. "Little Tree"
7. "Space Christmas"
8. "Fruit Loop Dreams" [Acoustic Version] (Yamano, Pat Fear)
9. "Boys" (Wes Farrell, Luther Dixon)
10. "Till the End of the Day" (Ray Davies)
11. "Elmer Elevator"
12. "Don't Hurt My Little Sister" (Brian Wilson, Mike Love)
13. "Strawberry Cream Puff"
14. "Neon Zebra" (Nakatani, Fear)
15. "Lazybone"
16. "Public Bath"
17. "I Wanna Eat Choco Bars"
18. "Redd Kross"
