= Shonen Knife =

Japanese rock band

Shonen Knife 少年ナイフ
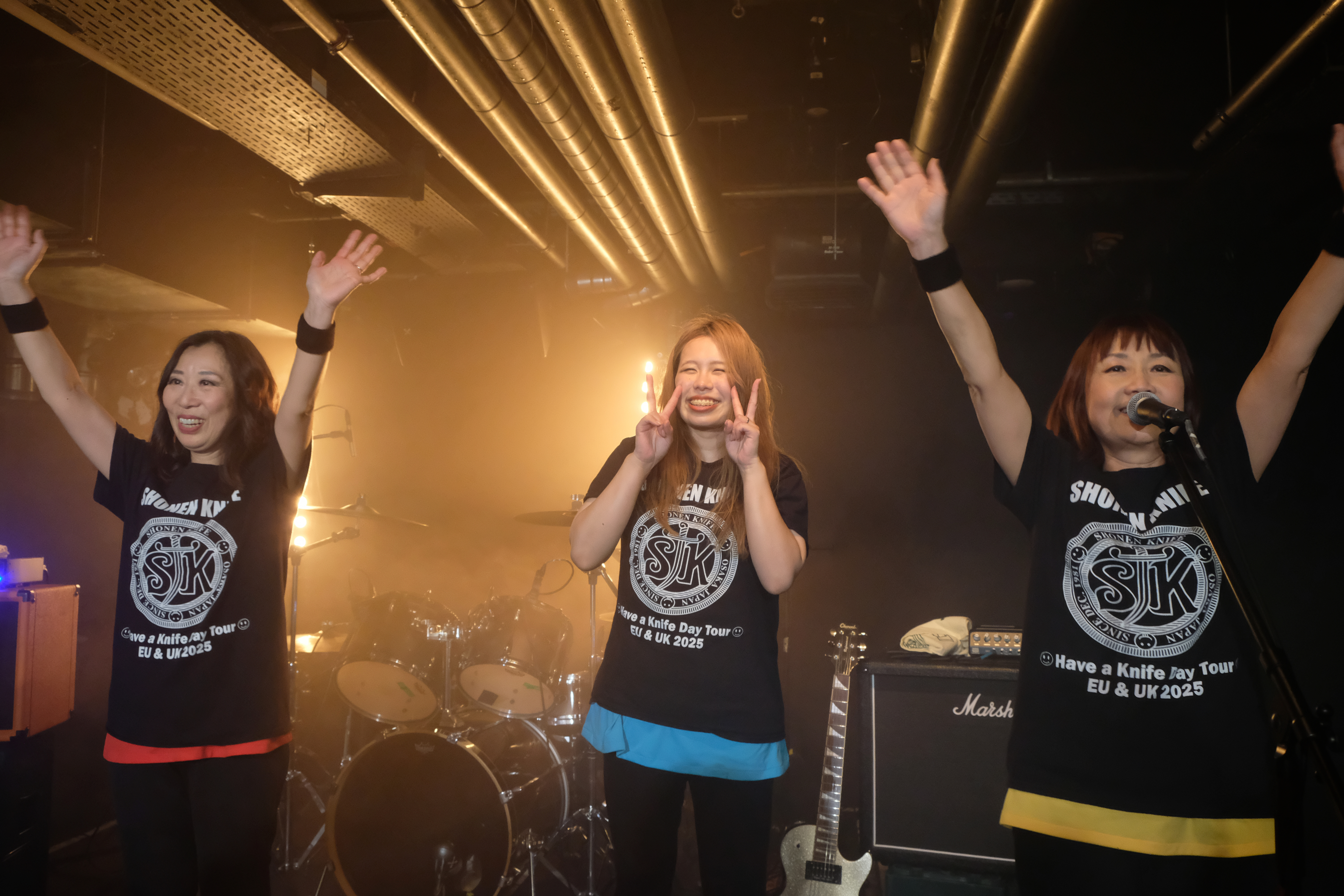
- Shonen Knife in 2025 (L-R: Atsuko Yamano, Risa Kawano, Naoko Yamano)

Background information
- Origin: Osaka, Japan
- Genres: Pop-punk; alternative rock
- Years active: 1981–present
- Labels: Virgin; K; Good Charamel Records; Damnably
- Members: Naoko Yamano; Atsuko Yamano; Risa Kawano
- Past members: Michie Nakatani; Mana Nishiura; Etsuko Nakanishi; Naru Ishizuka; Emi Morimoto; Ritsuko Taneda
- Website: www.shonenknife.net

Shonen Knife is a Japanese pop-punk band formed in Osaka in 1981. Influenced by 1960s girl groups, pop bands, the Beach Boys, and early punk rock bands such as the Ramones, the band crafts stripped-down songs with simple yet unconventional lyrics sung in both Japanese and English.

The band has been credited with making "the international pop underground more international" by "opening it up to bands from Japan". They have also performed as a Ramones tribute band under the name the Osaka Ramones. Guitarist/singer Naoko Yamano is the only member to have remained with the band for its entire history; her sister Atsuko Yamano was a founding member and, after a long hiatus, returned to the band in 2016. They have released 22 studio albums; their most recent album Our Best Place was released in February 2023.

In the words of the Boston Globe, "something oddly spellbinding occurs when deceivingly silly lyrics are sandwiched between a buoyant guitar and a rapid-fire, pop-punk drum kit. Which perhaps explains why the Japanese female alternative rock/pop punk trio Shonen Knife is still singing songs about cookies, sushi, jelly beans, and, of course, banana chips."

== Biography ==
=== Formation and early years ===
Shonen Knife was formed in December 1981 in Osaka, Japan, by Naoko Yamano on guitar and vocals; her college friend Michie Nakatani on bass, keyboards, and vocals; and Naoko's then 17-year-old sister Atsuko Yamano on drums. Naoko and Michie had both worked at office jobs; Atsuko had received training as a fashion designer and has created many of the band's stage outfits. The band was named after an old brand of pen knife that had been marketed to Japanese boys. At the time of their formation, Shonen Knife was a relative anomaly because all-female rock bands were rare in Japan at the time. While cultivating a punk rock sound, the band emphasized positivity using catchy, upbeat melodies and simple, carefree lyrics that often dealt with sweets, animals, and consumer culture. As explained by Nakatani in an interview, "We've always enjoyed writing songs about everyday things. Besides, there are already enough bands out there singing about pollution, war and poverty. While we all care very much about those things, we also feel that music should be fun."

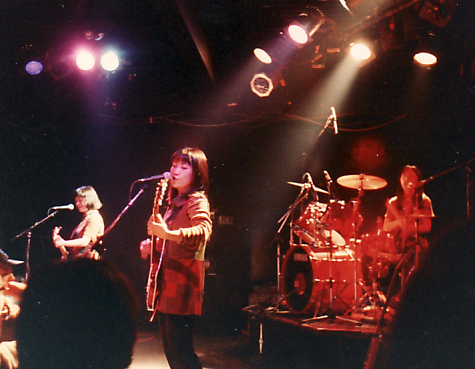
The original lineup of Shonen Knife performing in the 1980s (L-R: Michie Nakatani, Naoko Yamano, Atsuko Yamano)

They played their first gig in Osaka in March 1982, and self-released the cassette-only album Minna Tanoshiku later that year. Their first full-length album Burning Farm was released in 1983, followed by Yama-no Attchan in 1984. While the band's early albums were only officially released in Japan, imported copies attracted a cult following among alternative rock fans in the United States. In 1985, Burning Farm attracted the attention of K Records in Olympia, Washington, which re-released the album in America.

In 1986 the band released multiple international versions of the album Pretty Little Baka Guy, with the American version issued by Sub Pop, and their song "One Day of the Factory" appeared on an international compilation released by that label. In 1987, Shonen Knife was invited to open for Sonic Youth in Osaka, and played internationally for the first time at a concert in Los Angeles with organizational support from Sonic Youth and Redd Kross. The band's cult following among musicians was illustrated by the 1991 tribute album Every Band Has a Shonen Knife Who Loves Them, with cover songs by 23 punk and alternative rock acts.

=== International recognition ===
The band released the album 712 in 1991. Shonen Knife received significant international recognition later that year when longtime fan Kurt Cobain invited them to open for Nirvana during a European tour, shortly before Nirvana gained widespread fame for their album Nevermind. Cobain praised Shonen Knife's performances during the tour, stating, "When I finally got to see them live, I was transformed into a hysterical nine-year-old girl at a Beatles concert." Shonen Knife admitted to not knowing who Nirvana was before the invitation, but acknowledged the friendliness and helpfulness of Cobain and the other members of the band during Shonen Knife's first lengthy international tour. Naoko Yamano taught Cobain to play the Shonen Knife song "Twist Barbie", and Nirvana covered the song several times during the tour. Cobain later listed Shonen Knife's Burning Farm as one of his favorite albums.

Shonen Knife signed with Capitol Records in 1992 and released the album Let's Knife in 1993, featuring re-recorded versions of many of their older songs with new English lyrics. The album Rock Animals was released internationally by Virgin Records in 1994, and the video for the song "Tomato Head" was featured on the American TV series Beavis & Butthead. In 1994, Shonen Knife toured throughout the United States with the Lollapalooza festival. Later that year they contributed to the Carpenters tribute album If I Were a Carpenter. In the late 1990s, Shonen Knife lost their international record contract and their albums were only available as imports from Japan. The album Brand New Knife was released in 1997, followed by Happy Hour in 1998.

=== Line-up changes and early 21st century ===
Shonen Knife endured its first lineup change in 1999, when Michie Nakatani left the band and retired from music. For the band's next several albums, Atsuko Yamano played both drums and bass; for live performances she switched to bass and drummer Mana Nishiura was recruited for touring purposes. Nishiura did not perform on Shonen Knife's studio albums and was not considered an official member because she continued to play with her full-time band DMBQ. The albums Strawberry Sound (2000), Heavy Songs (2002), Candy Rock (2003), and Genki Shock! (2006), were recorded as a duo with Naoko Yamano on guitar and vocals and Atsuko Yamano on bass and drums. Nishiura died in a car accident in 2005 while on tour with DMBQ. She was replaced by new full-time drummer Etsuko Nakanishi.

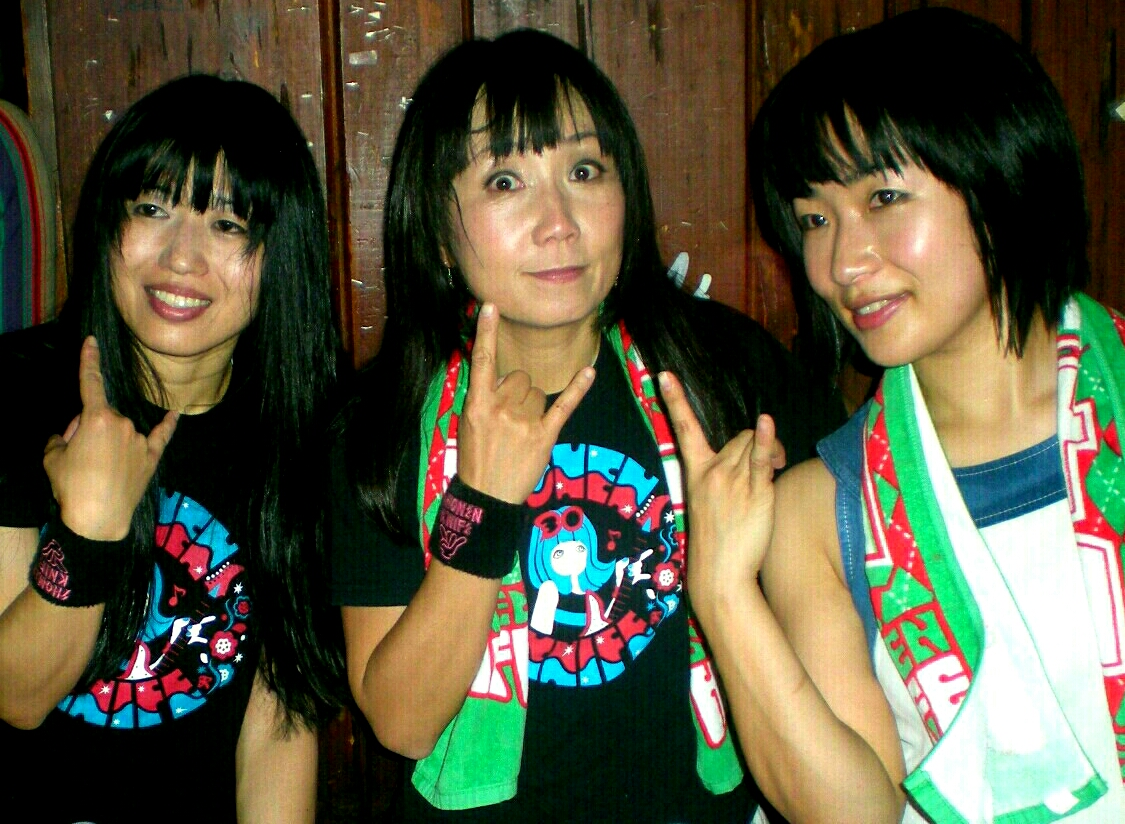
The 2011 lineup of Shonen Knife (L-R: Ritsuko Taneda, Naoko Yamano, Emi Morimoto)

In late 2006, Atsuko Yamano left the band to get married and move to the United States. This left Naoko Yamano as the last remaining original member of the band. Atsuko was replaced by bassist Ritsuko Taneda, previously of the J-pop band Denki Candy. In the following years, Atsuko would occasionally play with the band during tours outside of Japan, at which time Taneda would switch to rhythm guitar; Atsuko did not play on the band's studio albums during this period. The lineup of Naoko Yamano, Ritsuko Taneda, and Etsuko Nakanishi released the albums Super Group (2008) and Free Time (2010). In 2009 Shonen Knife signed with Damnably in the United Kingdom, and with Good Charamel in the United States at the invitation of label owner Robby Takac. Nakanishi left the band in 2010 and was replaced by Emi Morimoto. During this period they made a high-profile appearance at the All Tomorrow's Parties festival in England, at the invitation of Matt Groening.

In 2011 Shonen Knife released the Ramones tribute album Osaka Ramones. This was followed by the original albums Pop Tune in 2012 and Overdrive in 2014. From April 2015 to May 2016 Taneda took a leave of absence from the band to give birth, and was temporarily replaced by bassist Naru Ishizuka. Also in 2015, Morimoto left the band (she would later join Otoboke Beaver) and was replaced by 22 year-old drummer Risa Kawano, formerly of the band Brinky. During this period they made another appearance at the All Tomorrow's Parties festival.

In mid-2016, Taneda returned from maternity leave but did so on rhythm guitar, allowing Ishizuka to remain as the band's bassist. This briefly made Shonen Knife's official lineup a quartet for the first time. However, a short time later, founding member Atsuko Yamano rejoined the band as bassist and the band was again reduced to a trio consisting of the Yamano sisters and Risa Kawano. Taneda and Ishizuka would make occasional guest appearances on the band's next two albums. This incarnation of the band released the album Adventure, which was inspired by 1970s classic rock, in 2016 and the live album and video Alive! In Osaka the following year. Sweet Candy Power was released in 2019 and Our Best Place followed in 2023, promoted by the band's first tour since the COVID-19 pandemic began.

== Members ==
Current

- Naoko Yamano – lead and backing vocals, guitar (1981–present)
- Atsuko Yamano – drums and backing vocals (1981–2005); bass, backing and occasional lead vocals (1999–2006, 2008–present; touring & recording 2008–present)
- Risa Kawano – drums, backing and occasional lead vocals (2015–present)

Former

- Michie Nakatani – bass, lead and backing vocals, keyboards (1981–1999)
- Mana "China" Nishiura – drums (2001–2005; touring only)
- Etsuko Nakanishi – drums, backing vocals (2005–2010)
- Ritsuko Taneda – bass, backing vocals, occasional rhythm guitar (2006–2015, 2016)
- Emi Morimoto – drums, backing vocals (2010–2015)
- Naru Ishizuka – bass (2015–2016)

== Discography ==
- Minna Tanoshiku (1982)
- Burning Farm (1983)
- Yama-no Attchan (1984)
- Pretty Little Baka Guy (1986)
- 712 (1991)
- Let's Knife (1992)
- Rock Animals (1993)
- The Birds & the B-Sides (1996)
- Brand New Knife (1997)
- Happy Hour (1998)
- Strawberry Sound (2000)
- Heavy Songs (2002)
- Candy Rock (2003)
- Genki Shock! (2006)
- Fun! Fun! Fun! (2007)
- Super Group (2008)
- Free Time (2010)
- Osaka Ramones (2011)
- Pop Tune (2012)
- Overdrive (2014)
- Adventure (2016)
- Alive! In Osaka (2018)
- Sweet Candy Power (2019)
- Our Best Place (2023)
