= Good Charamel Records =

Indie record label

- Founded: 2003
- Founder: Robby Takac
- Genre: Rock pop punk, pop, J-pop
- Country of origin: U.S.
- Location: Buffalo, New York
- Official website: www.goodcharamel.com

Good Charamel Records is an indie record label based in Buffalo, New York started by Robby Takac of the Goo Goo Dolls in 2003. Specializing in female fronted Japanese rock bands, the label began signing and releasing music in North America for local Buffalo bands as well as releasing compilations and charity discs in the Western New York area. As a result of a 2006 tour of Japan with the Good Charamel act The Juliet Dagger a relationship was struck between the legendary Osaka pop punk band Shonen Knife and Good Charamel Records, Good Charamel hosted Shonen Knife's tour of America with The Juliet Dagger and Verona Grove in 2007. In 2009, Good Charamel released Shonen Knife's "Super Group" album and began signing other Japanese rock acts, then releasing and producing music and DVDs by Japanese artists exclusively.

== Artists ==
=== Current ===
- Shonen Knife
- Pinky Doodle Poodle
- MOLICE
- DJ Sashimi

=== Former ===
- LAZYgunsBRISKY (Japan)
- TsuShiMaMiRe (Japan)
- Last Conservative
- The Juliet Dagger
- KLEAR
- Terry Sullivan
- Damien Simon
- Agent Me
- Jim Kurdziel / Matt Bergman (Comedy)
- Amungus

== Discography ==
Catalog #	Release name	Artist	Release date
GC001	Music is Art 2003 (CD/DVD)	Various	2003
GC002	On To The Next One	Last Conservative	2004
GC003	Makin' Noise	KLEAR	2004
GC004	Turn Up The Death	The Juliet Dagger	2004
GC005	Music is Art 2004	Various	2004
GC006	TheErthMoovsAroundTheSun	Terry Sullivan	2005
GC007	Muddle	Damien Simon	2005
GC008	Music is Hope	Various	2005
GC009	Music is Art 2005	Various	2006
GC010	Pretty New Things	Last Conservative	2006
GC011	Saturday Morning: Music from the Pez Animated Feature	The Juliet Dagger	2006
GC012	Hi-Ya (Enhanced CD)	The Juliet Dagger	2006
GC013	Consolation Prize	Agent Me	2008
GC014	Amungus EP	Amungus	2008
GC015	Super Group	Shonen Knife	2009
GC016	Free Time	Shonen Knife	2010
GC017	Fun! Fun! Fun! (Vinyl Re-Issue)	Shonen Knife	2010
GC018	Shonen Knife: Live at Mohawk Place (DVD)	Shonen Knife	2010
GC019	26 Times	LAZYgunsBRISKY	2010
GC020	Sex on the Beach	TsuShiMaMiRe	2010
GC021	Catalystrock	MOLICE	2010
GC022	I Love J Rock	Various	2010
GC023	Live From Tokyo (DVD)	Various	2011
GC024	Friends (Comedy DVD)	Matt Bergman / James Kurdziel	2011
GC025	Osaka Ramones	Shonen Knife	2011
GC026	Giving More Blood	TsuShiMaMiRe	2012
GC027	LAZYgunsBRISKY	LAZYgunsBRISKY	2012
GC028	Sweet Christmas	Shonen Knife	2011
GC029	Neugravity	MOLICE	2012
GC030	Dr Ray (Re-Issue)	MOLICE	2012
GC031	Shocking	TsuShiMaMiRe	2012
GC032	Pop Tune	Shonen Knife	2012
GC033	I Love J Rock 2	various	2012
GC034	Pinky Doodle Poodle	Pinky Doodle Poodle	2014
GC035	Overdrive	Shonen Knife	2014
GC036	Fun! Fun! Fun! (CD Re- Issue)	Shonen Knife	2014
GC037	Resonance Love	MOLICE	2014
GC038	Osaka Ramones Live	Shonen Knife / CJ Ramone	2015
GC039	Inside is Out	Pinky Doodle Poodle	2015
GC040	Adventure	Shonen Knife	2016
GC041	5	MOLICE	2016
GC042	Get It On	Pinky Doodle Poodle	2016
GC043	Poodle Boogie	Pinky Doodle Poodle	2017
GC044	Signs	The Molice	2017
