= P-Vine Records =

Japanese independent record label

- Founded: 1976
- Founder: Yasufumi Higurashi; Akira Kochi
- Genre: Various
- Country of origin: Japan
- Location: Tokyo
- Official website: p-vine.jp

P-Vine Records is an independent record label based in Tokyo, Japan.

== History ==
It was started in 1976 by Blues Interactions, a firm founded in 1975 by Yasufumi Higurashi and Akira Kochi, as a record label focused on black music. The label name comes from the "Peavine Branch" of the Mississippi Yazoo and Mississippi Valley Railroad sung in blues songs by Charley Patton and Big Joe Williams.

In the early years, the label focused on blues and R&B but gradually expanded to wider genres such as jazz, Latin, funk, j-pop, house music, and garage punk.

The label has released some newly recorded materials, including the album Original Chicago Blues with Kansas City Red, Eddie Taylor, and Big John Wrencher and Judy Roberts' third album, Nights in Brazil. But its focus has been on reissuing vintage recordings. P-Vine has released materials from labels such as Chess, Delmark, Modern/Kent, Black Top, and Alligator. It was also responsible for releasing previously unreleased live and studio recordings by Parliament-Funkadelic, as well for releasing albums on CD that were previously only released on vinyl.

Apart from the P-Vine label, Blues Interactions once launched other labels, such as Substance and P-Vine NonStop. As of 2021, these labels are defunct. They also published magazines (Blues & Soul Records and Black Music Review) and books. As of 2021, Blues & Soul Records magazine have been transferred to Two Virgins, while Black Music Review suspended its publication in November, 2011. The current P-Vine, Inc. publishes some books under its Ele-King brand.

In 2015 P-Vine released B.B. King The Complete RPM-Kent Recording Box, The Life, Times and the Blues of B.B. in All His Glory, a boxed set of 17 CDs, with comprehensive booklet, vinyl record and Japanese translation of The Arrival of B.B. King The Authorized Biography by Charles Sawyer.

From the late 1970s to the 1980s, P-Vine organized concerts such as the Blues Show with Albert Collins, Eddie Vinson, and John Lee Hooker traveling to Japan. Around 2007, Blues Interactions temporarily reactivated its concert promoter business. In 2008, it organized the P-Vine Blues Festival in Tokyo with Willie Walker and others on the bill.

Blues Interactions had been independently owned by the two founders until November 2006 when Space Shower Networks, a cable-television enterprise focusing on music, acquired 49% of its stock. In November 2007, Blues Interactions became a wholly owned subsidiary of Space Shower Networks, and the two founders withdrew from management. The new management announced that the company would maintain the P-Vine label and its name.

In April 2011, Blues Interactions changed its name to P-Vine Inc. and Toshio Mizutani was brought in as a new president of the company.

In February 2020, Mizutani acquired the entire stock of the company from Space Shower Networks, having the company return to independent status once again.
