= Michie Nakatani =

Japanese musician

Michie Nakatani 中谷美智枝
- Born: 8 October 1961 (age 64)
- Occupations: Musician; singer; songwriter
- Formerly of: Shonen Knife

Michie Nakatani (中谷美智枝, Nakatani Michie; born October 8, 1961) is a Japanese retired musician, best known as one of the founding members of the Japanese pop-punk band Shonen Knife.

== Biography ==
Nakatani was born in Osaka, Japan, the only child of a homemaker mother and an accountant father. She met future bandmate Naoko Yamano in college, and she spent some time working as a cartoonist's assistant. Nakatani and Yamano formed Shonen Knife in 1981, with Nakatani on bass, keyboards, and occasional lead vocals. She has named the Beatles, Beach Boys, The Jam, Redd Kross, and Cheap Trick as influences.

In 1995, Nakatani collaborated with Gary Waleik of the band Big Dipper on a project called The Japanese Beetles. They recorded one single. She toured the world regularly with Shonen Knife during this period, except for missing some shows due to illness in 1997. She left Shonen Knife and retired from music in 1999. The band continues to perform some songs written by Nakatani live. A lyric from her song "Catnip Dream" was included in the 2002 book Hokkaido Popsicle, written by Isaac Adamson.
