= Atsuko Yamano =

Japanese musician

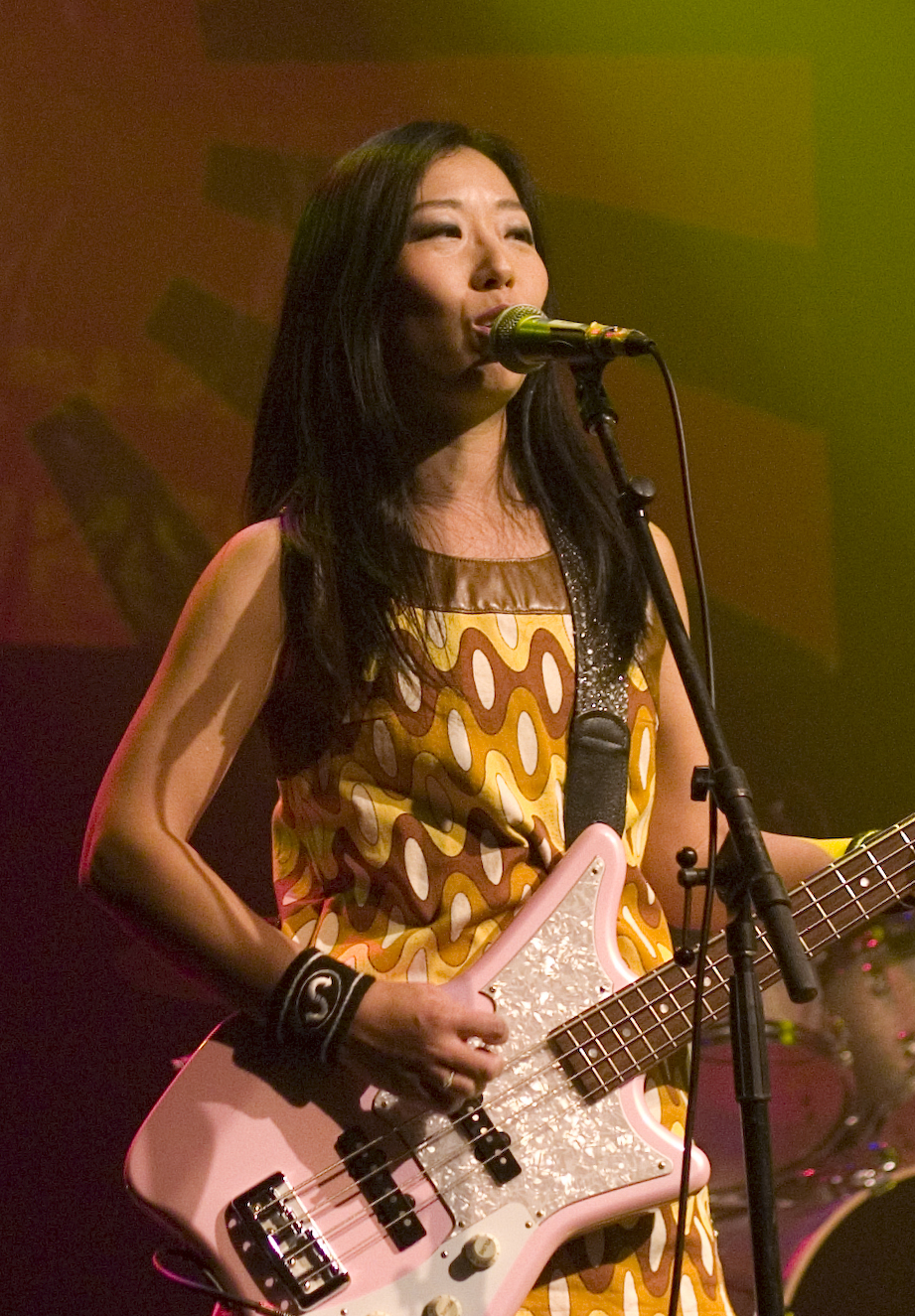
- Atsuko Yamano performing live in Manhattan at the Blender Theater, November 19, 2007

Background information
- Born: Atsuko Yamano; February 22, 1964 (age 62); Osaka Prefecture, Japan
- Genres: Pop-punk, alternative rock, indie pop
- Occupation: Musician
- Instruments: Drums, bass, vocals
- Years active: 1981–present
- Member of: Shonen Knife
- Website: www.shonenknife.net

Atsuko Yamano (山野 敦子, Yamano Atsuko; born February 22, 1964) is a Japanese musician, best known as a member of the pop-punk band Shonen Knife. She formed the band in 1981 at age 17, along with her sister Naoko Yamano and Michie Nakatani. In the first incarnation of the band she played drums, but switched to bass when Nakatani departed in 1999. Yamano is also a fashion designer who designs and makes the band's stage outfits. Yamano retired from Shonen Knife in 2006 to marry, and moved to Los Angeles. During the next several years she occasionally toured with the band. She returned to the band as a full-time member in 2016.
