= Naoko Yamano =

Japanese musician

- 山野直子
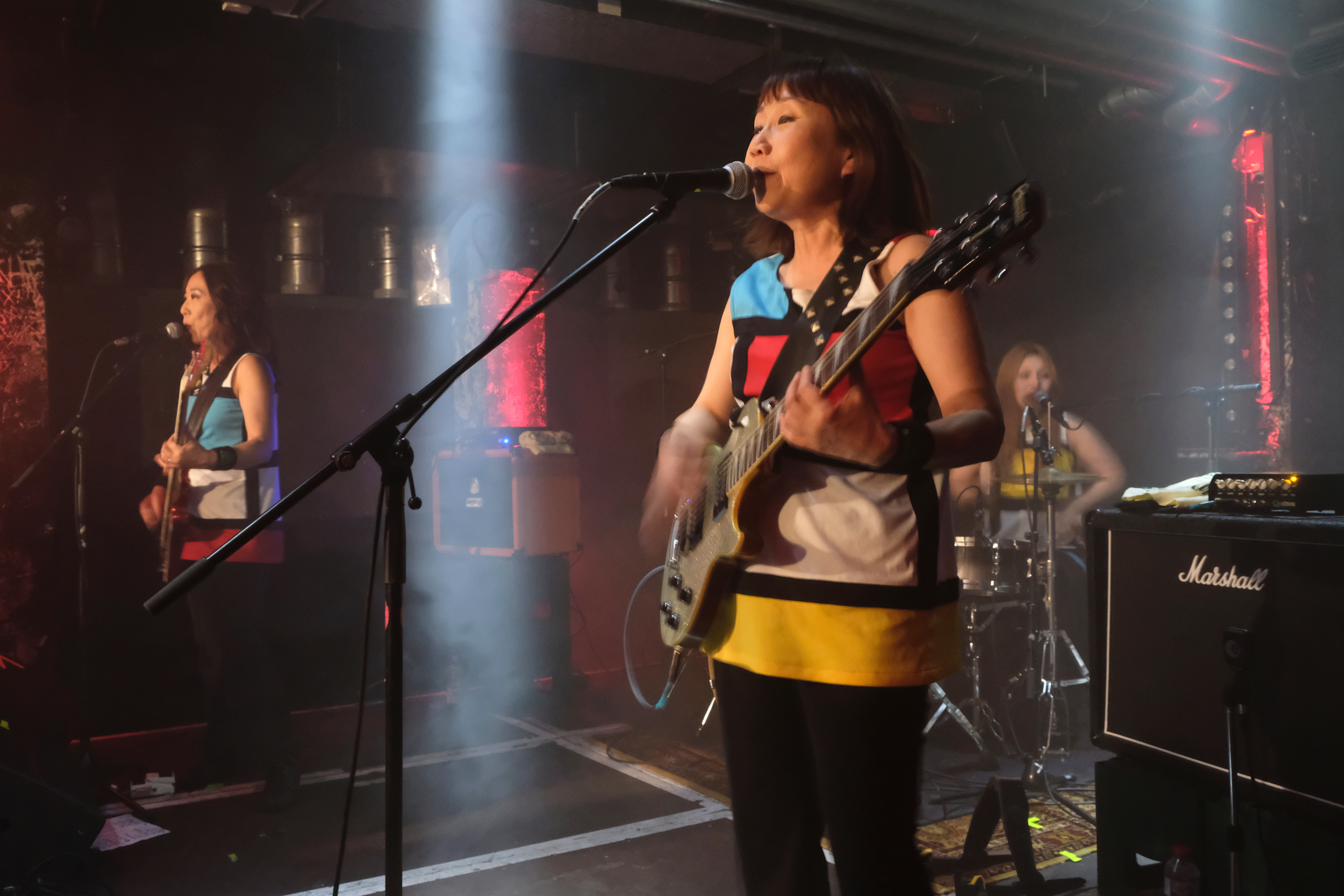
- Yamano (foreground) performing with Shonen Knife in Munich at the Rote Sonne Club, May 8, 2025.
- Born: December 18, 1960 (age 65); Osaka Prefecture, Japan
- Occupation: Musician
- Years active: 1981–present
- Relatives: Atsuko Yamano (sister)
- Musical career
- Genres: Pop punk; post-punk; alternative rock; indie rock; indie pop
- Instruments: Guitar; vocals; bass; keyboards
- Member of: Shonen Knife
- Website: shonenknife.net

Naoko Yamano (山野直子, Yamano Naoko; born December 18, 1960) is a Japanese musician, best known as a founding member, singer/guitarist, and primary songwriter for the pop-punk band Shonen Knife. She is the only member of the band to have remained throughout its entire history. After briefly working as a receptionist in a doctor's office, she formed the band in late 1981 with her college friend Michie Nakatani and her younger sister Atsuko Yamano. Naoko Yamano is known for her songs about food and animals, with music that is primary influenced by the Ramones and the Beatles.
