= What I Learned About Ego, Opinion, Art & Commerce =

Ego, Opinion, Art & Commerce

Compilation album by Goo Goo Dolls
- Released: July 17, 2001
- Recorded: 1987–2000
- Genre: Alternative rock
- Length: 78:36
- Label: Warner Bros.
- Producer: Goo Goo Dolls

Goo Goo Dolls chronology
Dizzy Up the Girl (1998)	Ego, Opinion, Art & Commerce (2001)	Gutterflower (2002)

Professional ratings
Review scores
Source	Rating
Allmusic	4/5 stars
Entertainment Weekly	B
Kerrang!	3/5 stars

What I Learned About Ego, Opinion, Art & Commerce is a compilation album by American rock band Goo Goo Dolls. It was released in 2001 by Warner Bros. Records and is a compilation of Goo Goo Dolls songs released from 1987 to 2000.

Tracks 1–4 are from the album Dizzy Up the Girl. Tracks 5–9 are from the album A Boy Named Goo. Tracks 10–16 are from the album Superstar Car Wash. Tracks 17–20 are from the album Hold Me Up. Track 21 is from the album Jed. Track 22 is from the album Goo Goo Dolls. Multiple songs, such as "Acoustic #3" and "All Eyes On Me", have an extended musical interlude. "Two Days In February" was re-recorded by Rzeznik, a studio version of the original, which was recorded outside. "Naked" is an extended version of the original, which was on A Boy Named Goo, and is similar to the version released as a single. All songs are remixed and remastered.

The album is not a typical best-of compilation, as most of the band's biggest hits (such as "Iris" and "Name") are absent. Instead, the selection is a combination of non-singles and songs that were released as singles prior to the Goo Goo Dolls' 1995 breakout, as well as fan favorites and a few of their less successful singles.

The song "Name" was released on this album as an exclusive to Japan.

== Track listing ==
No.	Title	Length
1.	"Bullet Proof"	4:37
2.	"All Eyes on Me"	4:04
3.	"Amigone"	3:15
4.	"Acoustic #3"	1:53
5.	"Naked"	4:05
6.	"Ain't That Unusual"	3:19
7.	"Burnin' Up"	2:32
8.	"Flat Top"	4:29
9.	"Eyes Wide Open" ("Name" is in this spot on the UK version)	3:55
10.	"Fallin' Down"	3:14
11.	"Another Second Time Around"	3:00
12.	"Cuz You're Gone"	3:33
13.	"We Are the Normal"	3:36
14.	"Girl Right Next to Me"	3:44
15.	"Lucky Star"	3:06
16.	"On the Lie"	3:16
17.	"Just the Way You Are"	3:14
18.	"Two Days in February" (Re-recorded in 2000)	3:12
19.	"Laughing"	3:41
20.	"There You Are"	3:05
21.	"Up Yours"	1:37
22.	"I'm Addicted"	2:59
23.	"Name (Japan Exclusive)"	4:29
