= Waiting for the Rest of It =

EP by Goo Goo Dolls
- Released: July 17, 2010
- Genre: Alternative rock
- Length: 22:23
- Label: Warner Bros.

Waiting for the Rest of It is an EP released by the Goo Goo Dolls in 2010 for Warner Bros. Records. It was made available to all ticket holders for the Something for the Rest of Us Tour, from July 17 onward. The EP was used to promote the Goo Goo Dolls' pending album, Something for the Rest of Us.

== Track listing ==
No.	Title	Writer(s)	Length
1.	"Home"	John Rzeznik, Andy Stochansky	4:44
2.	"Sweetest Lie"	Rzeznik	3:23
3.	"Now I Hear"	Robby Takac, Rzeznik	3:20
4.	"Still Your Song"	Rzeznik, Stochansky	4:22
5.	"Broadway" (Live)	Rzeznik	6:34

== Sources ==
- (under home tab, within news feed for July 2010)
