= I'm Awake Now =

Single by Goo Goo Dolls

from the album Freddy's Dead: The Final Nightmare (Music from the Motion Picture)
- Released: 1991
- Recorded: 1991
- Genre: Alternative rock
- Length: 3:16
- Label: Warner Bros.
- Songwriters: John Rzeznik, Robbie Takac, George Tutuska
- Producer: Michael Vail Blum

Goo Goo Dolls singles chronology
"There You Are" (1990)	"I'm Awake Now" (1991)	"We Are the Normal" (1993)

Music video
- "I'm Awake Now" on YouTube

"I'm Awake Now" is a single by the Goo Goo Dolls, released in 1991 as part of the Freddy's Dead: The Final Nightmare soundtrack. This track was not widely released as a commercial single; it was distributed primarily in a promotional format, similar to other early singles by the band. The song was later included on the Goo Goo Dolls' 2008 compilation album, Greatest Hits Vol. 2.

== Track listing ==
- "I'm Awake Now" – 3:16

== Music video ==
A music video was produced for "I'm Awake Now," featuring the band attempting to find something to watch on television. They come across one of the A Nightmare on Elm Street films and decide to watch it. As they watch, they fall asleep and have a nightmare involving Freddy Krueger (portrayed by Robert Englund), who terrorizes them. The video includes several scenes from Freddy's Dead: The Final Nightmare, showing the band members experiencing fear and fascination as they imagine themselves viewing the movie in a theater.
