= Long Way Down (Goo Goo Dolls song) =

1996 single by Goo Goo Dolls

Single by Goo Goo Dolls

from the album A Boy Named Goo
- Released: June 11, 1996
- Genre: Pop-punk
- Length: 3:28
- Label: Warner Bros.
- Songwriter: John Rzeznik
- Producer: Lou Giordano

Goo Goo Dolls singles chronology
"Naked" (1996)	"Long Way Down" (1996)	"Lazy Eye" (1997)

"Long Way Down" is a song by American rock band Goo Goo Dolls from their 1995 breakthrough album, A Boy Named Goo. Released as the album's fifth and final single, "Long Way Down" reached No. 7 on the US Billboard Mainstream Rock Tracks chart and No. 25 on the Modern Rock Tracks chart. While it did not appear on the Billboard Top 40/Mainstream chart, it did reach No. 49 on the Radio & Records CHR/Pop chart. "Long Way Down" appeared on the soundtrack for the 1996 film Twister. The band performed the song on the May 22, 1996, episode of Beverly Hills, 90210.

== Music video ==
The official music video for "Long Way Down" shows the three band members playing in a darkened room, with quick and dizzying camera angles.

== Track listings ==
1. "Long Way Down" – 3:28
2. "Don't Change" (live)
3. "Name" (live)

Germany release

1. "Long Way Down" (Tom Lord-Alge remix) – 3:31
2. "Don't Change" (live) – 3:48
3. "Name" (live) – 3:53

== Charts ==
=== Weekly charts ===
Chart (1996)	Peak position
US Alternative Airplay (Billboard)	25
US Mainstream Rock (Billboard)	7
US CHR/Pop Airplay Chart (Radio & Records)	49

=== Year-end charts ===
Chart (1996)	Position
US Mainstream Rock Tracks (Billboard)	43

== Cover versions ==
"Long Way Down" was covered by the metalcore band Haste the Day as the final track on their album When Everything Falls, released in 2005 on Solid State Records. In 2009, the rapper Charles Hamilton sampled "Long Way Down" on a song titled "Something" for his mixtape My Brain Is Alive.
