= The Inbetween =

Studio album by Scarlet White
- Released: October 14, 2014
- Recorded: GCR Audio, Buffalo, NY
- Genre: Christian rock; alternative metal; post-grunge; hard rock
- Length: 52:06
- Label: Independent
- Producer: Justin Rose, Scarlet White

Scarlet White chronology
Scarlet White (2012)	The Inbetween (2014)	The Other Side (2017)

Singles from The Inbetween
- 1. "Never Met" Released: May 20, 2014; 2. "Fire" Released: January 30, 2015; 3. "Worthy" Released: April 7, 2015

Professional ratings
Review scores
Source	Rating
Contrast Control	Recommended
Jesus Freak Hideout	Positive
Jesus Wired	8/10 stars
New Release Tuesday	Positive

The Inbetween is the second studio album by American Christian rock band Scarlet White The album was self–released on October 14, 2014.

== Production ==
The album was recorded at GCR Audio in Buffalo, New York, which is owned by Robby Takac of the Goo Goo Dolls. Justin Rose produced the album with the band.

== Track listing ==
All tracks are written by Scarlet White.

No.	Title	Length
1.	"The Inbetween"	1:21
2.	"Draggin' Them Down"	3:49
3.	"Long Way"	3:10
4.	"By Your Throne"	3:09
5.	"Wake of the King"	3:29
6.	"War"	3:13
7.	"A Letter"	3:49
8.	"Fire"	4:15
9.	"Bury Me"	4:21
10.	"I Am Yours"	4:49
11.	"So Young"	4:01
12.	"Worthy"	4:28

Bonus tracks
No.	Title	Length
13.	"Never Met"	4:15
14.	"Worthy" (acoustic)	3:55
Total length:		52:06

== Personnel ==
Scarlet White

- Spencer Minor – lead vocals
- Dan Hall – guitar
- Bradley Preston — bass
- Jacob Hendricks – drums, percussion

Additional personnel

- Justin Rose – engineer
- Mike Langford – mixing
- Peter Letros – mastering
- Richie English – orchestration, piano, keyboards, backing vocals
- Claire Fisher – violin
- Gretchen Fisher – violin
- Kiersten Fisher – viola
- Katie Weismann – cello
- Bradley Preston – bass
- Joe Donahue – backing vocals
- Hannah Matthews – backing vocals
