= Boxes (Goo Goo Dolls album) =

Studio album by Goo Goo Dolls
- Released: May 6, 2016
- Studio: Henson (Hollywood); The Arcade (New York); GCR Audio (Buffalo)
- Genre: Pop rock
- Length: 42:00
- Label: Warner Bros.
- Producer: Drew Pearson; Gregg Wattenberg; Derek A.E. Fuhrmann

Goo Goo Dolls chronology
| Magnetic (2013) | Boxes (2016) | Miracle Pill (2019) |

Singles from Boxes
- 1. "So Alive" Released: April 8, 2016; 2. "Over and Over" Released: October 12, 2016

Boxes is the eleventh studio album by American rock band Goo Goo Dolls. It was released on May 6, 2016, through Warner Bros. Records. It marks the band's first album since A Boy Named Goo recorded without drummer Mike Malinin, who was removed from the band in 2013, and their first album to be recorded as a duo. Upon release, Boxes debuted and peaked at #27 on the Billboard 200 albums chart, with first week sales of 15,000 copies. The album marks the first studio album released by the band to not debut in the top ten since 1998's Dizzy Up the Girl.

== Singles ==
The lead single from Boxes, "So Alive", was released on April 8, 2016. A second single, "Over And Over", was released to radio on October 12 of the same year, along with an official lyric video.

== Critical reception ==
Professional ratings
Review scores
| Source | Rating |
|---|---|
| AllMusic | 3/5 stars |

Stephen Thomas Erlewine of AllMusic rated the album three out of five stars and states: "(The band) unapologetically embraces their middle age, excising any remaining hints of the raucous rock band of yore and splitting their time between power ballads and insistent anthems."

== Track listing ==
| No. | Title | Writer(s) | Length |
|---|---|---|---|
| 1. | "Over and Over" | John Rzeznik, Robby Takac, Craig MacIntyre, Drew Pearson | 4:07 |
| 2. | "Souls in the Machine" | Rzeznik, Pearson | 3:50 |
| 3. | "Flood" (featuring Sydney Sierota) | Rzeznik, Derek Fuhrmann, Gregg Wattenberg | 4:12 |
| 4. | "The Pin" | Rzeznik, Pearson | 4:12 |
| 5. | "Boxes" | Rzeznik, Brad Fernquist | 4:22 |
| 6. | "Free of Me" | Takac | 3:35 |
| 7. | "Reverse" | Rzeznik, Jarrad Kritzstein, Pearson | 4:13 |
| 8. | "Lucky One" | Rzeznik, Fuhrmann, Wattenberg | 3:05 |
| 9. | "So Alive" | Rzeznik, Fuhrmann, Wattenberg | 3:15 |
| 10. | "Prayer in My Pocket" | Takac | 3:34 |
| 11. | "Long Way Home" | Rzeznik, Wattenberg, Jordan Miller | 3:34 |
| Total length: | | | 42:00 |

Japanese bonus track
| No. | Title | Length |
|---|---|---|
| 12. | "Walk Away" | 3:47 |

== Personnel ==
Credits taken from Boxes CD booklet.

Goo Goo Dolls

- John Rzeznik – guitar (all tracks), vocals (1–5, 7–9, 11), background vocals (3, 8, 9)
- Robby Takac – bass guitar (all tracks), vocals (6, 10)

Additional musicians

- Craig MacIntyre – drums (1, 2, 4, 5, 7), percussion (4)
- Brad Fernquist – guitar (1, 2, 4, 5, 7)
- Kim Kat – background vocals (2)
- Sydney Sierota – vocals (3)
- Gunnar Olsen – drums (3, 8, 9, 11), guitar (3, 8)
- Derek A.E. Fuhrmann – guitar (3, 6, 8, 10, 11), piano (3, 6, 10), background vocals (3, 8–11), programming (3, 6, 10)
- Gregg Wattenberg – guitar (3, 6, 8, 11), background vocals (3, 8–11), programming (3, 6, 10)
- Mike Adubato – piano (3, 6, 8–11), keyboards (9), programming (9)
- Mark Neisser – background vocals (3)
- Drew Pearson – keyboards (4)
- Yazz Alali – background vocals (5)
- Shawn Pelton – drums (6, 10)
- Jordan Miller – background vocals (9, 11)
- John Alicastro – background vocals (9)
- Michael Lauri – background vocals (9)
- Rachel Kanner – background vocals (9)
- George Hattori – guitar (10)
- Kit Walters – background vocals (10, 11)
- Gretchen Fisher – violin (10)
- Clare Fisher – violin (10)
- Kiersten Fisher – viola (10)
- Katie Weissman – cello (10)

Technical

- Drew Pearson – production (1, 2, 4, 5, 7), engineer (1, 2, 4, 5, 7)
- Derek A.E. Fuhrmann – production (3, 6, 8–11)
- Gregg Wattenberg – production (3, 6, 8–11)
- Kevin J. Estrada – engineer (1–5, 7)
- Mike Adubato – engineer (3, 6, 8–11)
- Justin Rose – engineer (9, 10), string production and engineering (10)
- Emerson Day – assistant engineer (1–5)
- Nicolas Essig – assistant engineer (7)
- Jeffery David – vocal production (3)
- Richie English – string arrangements (10)
- Mark Endert – mixing
- Doug Johnson – mixing assistant
- Tom Coyne – mastering

== Charts ==
| Chart (2016) | Peak position |
|---|---|
| Australian Albums (ARIA) | 78 |
| Canadian Albums (Billboard) | 72 |
| US Billboard 200 | 27 |
| US Top Rock Albums (Billboard) | 3 |
| UK Albums (OCC) | 72 |

== Release history ==
Source: Amazon.com

| Region | Date | Format(s) | Label |
|---|---|---|---|
| United States | May 6, 2016 | CD; digital download; vinyl | Warner Bros. |

== In popular culture ==
The single, "So Alive", was used in a 2017 television advertisement for BMW.
