= Up Yours =

Up Yours may refer to:

- "Up Yours", song by the Edgar Broughton Band, released in 1970
- "Up Yours", song by the Goo Goo Dolls from their album Jed
