= Lime Spiders =

Australian punk rock band

- Origin: Sydney, New South Wales, Australia
- Genres: Punk rock, alternative rock, garage rock, hard rock, acid punk
- Years active: 1979–1990, 1992, 1997, 2002, 2006–2023
- Labels: Green; Citadel; Virgin; Raven; Laneway

Lime Spiders were an Australian punk rock band who formed in 1979 with Mick Blood on lead vocals. He was later joined by Richard Lawson on drums, and David Sparks on guitar. Their debut studio album, The Cave Comes Alive! was released in June 1987 and reached the top 60 on the Kent Music Report Albums Chart. Their most successful single, "Weirdo Libido", was released in January that year and reached the top 50 on the related Kent Music Report Singles Chart. In April its music video was the first ever shown on Australian Broadcasting Corporation TV music series rage. The track was used on the 1988 feature film Young Einstein's soundtrack. The group disbanded in 1990 and in 1999 Australian musicologist, Ian McFarlane, noted they had provided "raucous sound mixed screaming vocals and wild, fuzz-tone guitar riffs to arrive at a mutant strain of acid punk that bordered on heavy metal".

== History ==
=== Early days: "25th Hour" to "Slave Girl" ===
The Lime Spiders were formed in 1979 by Michael Patrick "Mick" Blood on lead vocals, who cites their influences as being 1960s garage bands with psychedelic rock. Early fellow members included Eric Roman Grothe on guitar, Dave Guest on bass guitar, and Darryl John Mather on guitar. The band's name relates to a non-alcoholic cocktail – a combination of vanilla ice cream and lime soft drink (soda). The group's first show was supporting The Lonely Hearts on Christmas Eve 1979, which Mather later recalled: "We were absolutely horrible. So horrible that people didn't get it. I don't think I got it, either. We came back properly in late 1980".

By February 1981 the line-up had stabilised with Blood, Guest and Mather joined by Geoff Cleary on drums. In August that year the group added Richard Jakimyszyn on lead guitar, with Bill Gibson (later bassist for The Eastern Dark) often acting as MC and adding backing vocals and tambourine. The band played regularly, mostly around Sydney's inner city venues, but by February the following year they had split up. During September that year they reconvened with a new drummer, Stephen Rawle (ex-Room 101), replacing Cleary. The group entered a Battle of the Bands competition at the Southern Cross Hotel, the major prize being the recording and release of a single on Green records. The competition ran over three months and included 64 bands: The Lime Spiders won the competition, with one of their opponents in the final being The Most, who would later come to figure significantly in their story.

"I didn't cope well that night. We'd moved from hobbyists to being on the verge of becoming serious – we were rewarded with a record deal, like Radio Birdman had six years earlier. We got up and didn't miss a beat – a 40-minute set. We were in tune – which is something that The Lime Spiders weren't famous for – and we won. I vaguely remembered Bill Gibson standing at the back of the stage, constantly retuning all the guitars". – Mather

The recording sessions resulted in a four-track double single, "25th Hour", released on Green Records in June 1983. "25th Hour" was produced by Rob Younger (ex-Radio Birdman), and included covers of The Haunted's "1-2-5" (1966) and Liberty Bell's "That's How It Will Be". The title track was co-written by Blood and Mather, while the final track, "Can't Wait Long", was co-written by Blood and Jakimyszyn. Warwick Gilbert (ex-Radio Birdman, Hitmen) played bass guitar for the sessions, because Guest was not confident in his playing. The keyboards were provided by Bruce Tatham (later played with Decline of the Reptiles) who is also heard on The Celibate Rifles' debut album, Sideroxylon (April 1983). Bill Gibson provided backing vocals on two of the tracks.

American punk rockers, Dead Kennedys' lead singer, Jello Biafra, heard the group while touring in Sydney and he told Murray Engelheart of Juke Magazine:

"This could be the best time-warp style '60s garage revival I've ever heard. [They] seem to be more interested in re-creating Sixties garage mania than updating it. I never thought I'd hear a psychedelic slime band more hard core than Green Fuzz, but here they are". – Jello Biafra (2 June 1984)

However Lime Spiders fell apart again with Mather leaving before the single had appeared:

"I didn't like The Lime Spiders towards the end. I felt we had become heavy and were usurped by what was happening around us. In my eyes we were very much a covers band. I didn't see the band going anywhere and I was yearning to become more involved with seriously constructed pop music". – Mather

The group reformed again by August 1983 with Blood and Jakimyszyn joined by Tony Bambach on bass guitar and Richard Lawson on drums. Both were from The Most, one of their rivals in the Battle of the Bands competition. In March 1984 the new line-up recorded the band's second single, "Slave Girl", which was released in October on Citadel Records. It was co-produced by the band with Tom Misner, who Blood described as "an older dude who owned the School of Audio business (Central Recorders). He warmed immediately to the vibe of the song". It was co-written by Blood and Jakimyszyn. Blood later told TheDwarf website about writing the track: "[it] come from a throwaway riff that [Jakimyszyn] used to peel off automatically at rehearsals every time he plugged his guitar into his amp, to check his sound ... I asked [him] to keep playin' the riff, as I thought we could construct a song around it. He looked at me as if I was crazy ... but obligingly cranked his amp & played it with venom, as the band jammed on it for the first time ... I went away with the riff in my head without any lyrics. I woke up one Sat morning at a house I was staying at in [Chippendale] and the lyrics flooded my head and I wrote them down as fast as I was thinking of them ... [later] I came armed with the last verse. I suggested to Jacko that he play something he's never done before for the second guitar solo, to take the song to another level. ... [He] blew us away with a searing metal edged freakout before turning around & shyly seeking approval. It was difficult to speak with our mouths agape".

"Slave Girl" was the number-one independent single in Australia for 1984, it reached the Top 100 Kent Music Report Singles Chart, with over 5,000 copies shipped. The track received airplay in Europe including France, Germany, Spain and Sweden: "where fans in those territories became hooked on its wild acid-punk sound". In September 1984 the band added Gerard Corben on rhythm guitar (also ex-The Most). The success of "Slave Girl" led to the overseas release of a 12" mini-LP that compiled all six of their recorded tracks as Slave Girl. Allmusic's Stephen Cook praised the group for "[e]schewing some of the overtly psychedelic '60s touches and concocting an updated blend of crunching guitars, snarled vocals, and bottom-heavy bass and drums, the band come up with a surprisingly original sound". In January 1985 Jakimyszyn left the band (after being diagnosed with schizophrenia), and they continued without a replacement. As a four-piece they recorded another single with Younger producing, "Out of Control", which was released on Citadel in December 1985.

=== The Big Time: The Cave Comes Alive! ===
Towards the middle of 1985 Lime Spiders split up again with Blood travelling to Europe as a tourist. Whilst Blood was in Europe, he performed as a guest singer with Swedish band the Pushtwangers (for a single release) and also with a Greek group, Last Drive. The remaining members – Bambach, Corben and Lawson – performed as Adolphus using Mark Green as lead singer. Prior to Blood's departure for Europe, the band had an offer to create a track for an in-production feature film, Young Einstein (1988). Its producers originally wanted "Slave Girl", but the song's rights were already assigned internationally; so they asked if the group could provide a track that matched its feel. Blood returned to Australian in September 1986 and Lime Spiders reconvened. They released "Weirdo Libido", which was co-written by Blood and original guitarist Mather and produced by Cameron Allan, as a single, in January 1987 on Virgin Records. It peaked at No. 48 in February. In April its music video was the first one ever shown on rage, an Australian Broadcasting Corporation TV music series. The track subsequently appeared on the Young Einstein soundtrack.

Jakimyszyn rejoined in May 1987 in time for the release of Lime Spiders' debut album, The Cave Comes Alive! in June. The album was produced by David Price, and peaked at No. 54 on the Kent Music Report Albums Chart. AllMusic's David Szatmary found the album was the "snarling debut from the punk quartet who owe a debt to the '60s". Meanwhile, the six-track EP, Slave Girl, had reached the top of the United States college chart. It remained there long enough to generate interest in the group. With the release of the album, the band supported The Cult on a national tour. Jakimyszyn left the band again shortly afterwards. At the end of the year they began a North American tour spanning two months of shows in major US cities and several in Canada. The tour included supporting Faith No More and, for the final thirteen shows, supporting Public Image Ltd. Rolling Stone magazine described them as sounding like "the Sex Pistols on acid". Highlights included a backstage visit by Iggy Pop and Joey Ramone at the Cat Club in New York.

Blood described the tour:

"The States was a bit frustrating 'cos I felt we could have had a good shot at the title there. We did it in comparative luxury 'cos Virgin underwrote the tour. And we had Motörhead's tour bus! Unfortunately we never got back there. We did some shows supporting PiL, and five weeks of our own shows, and there was quite a buzz. There was this place called the Scream Club in LA, this big marble ballroom, and it was early in the tour, second gig or something, and we rocked up to play there and they were lined up around the block and I'm going, 'Are we at the right place?!' that's when I realised".

The group then toured Europe, playing at the Roskilde Festival in 1988. Their follow-up album, Volatile, with Peter Blyton producing, was released in May that year. It did not receive the same level of critical or commercial acceptance as The Cave Comes Alive!. Australian musicologist, Ian McFarlane, felt that it "contained a decent array of riff-heavy, hard rock tracks, but lacked the raw spark that had characterised the band's earlier output". While Szatmary at AllMusic declared it was "More '60s-style punk from these Australian rockers". The same recording sessions also resulted in a four-track 12" extended play, EP, which was released in March 1989. By the time Volatile had appeared the line-up had changed again: Bambach, Blood, Corben and Lawson were joined by Michael Couvret (ex-Celibate Rifles bass guitarist) on rhythm guitar.

In December 1988 Phil Hall (ex-Sardine v, Dropbears) replaced Bambach on bass guitar and Mark Wilkinson (of The Girlies) replaced Couvret on guitar. This line-up supported Iggy Pop on his January 1989 Australian Instinct tour at the Hordern Pavilion in Sydney and at the Newcastle Workers Club – which collapsed later that year in an earthquake. They recorded a cover of The Misunderstood's "Children of the Sun" for Timberyard Records' Christmas compilation Rockin Bethlehem. Wilkinson played on the band's third studio album, Beethoven's Fist, with Kevin Shirley producing, mixed by Michael Brauer, in Los Angeles. Wilkinson left before its release in November 1990. McFarlane described the album as "underrated hard rock". The track, "Mr Big Mouth", co-written by Wilkinson and Blood, was released as the B-side of the single from the album, "Cherry Red", which appeared in October. The band played a promotional show in London at The Marquee Club as a four piece, however, the group disbanded yet again soon after. McFarlane noted that over their career they had provided "raucous sound mixed screaming vocals and wild, fuzz-tone guitar riffs to arrive at a mutant strain of acid punk that bordered on heavy metal". While John Bush at AllMusic felt they were a "post-punk unit resurrecting the trashier elements of '60s garage and psychedelic rock with willful abandon".

=== Reunions and reformations: Nine Miles High ===
In 1992 Blood and Hall revived Lime Spiders, with new members Luke Mason on drums; and Jayne Murphy (born Peter Murphy; now singer/guitarist of Flowers For Jayne, 2019 -) on lead guitar. They supported The Black Crowes on their Australian tour in June, but within six months had disbanded again. In 1995 "Slave Girl" was covered by the Goo Goo Dolls on their album, A Boy Named Goo. The Lime Spiders reformed in 1998 with a line-up of Bambach, Blood, Corben, Lawson, and a new guitarist, Dave Sparks.

In September 2002 a compilation album, Nine Miles High, was released by Raven Records/EMI Records, it comprised 26 tracks, including rare B-sides and EP cuts, as well as a twelve-page booklet outlining the band's history, which was followed by the first tour of the band in five years. In 2004 the band played a single performance as special guests to the Detroit group, MC5.

2006 Annandale Hotel Poster

The band then reformed again for an exclusive show at the Annandale Hotel in May 2006. The line-up featured the return of early guitarist, Jakimyszyn. The Lime Spiders again reformed in the following year, with the line-up of Blood, Corben, Hall, Lawson, and Sparks. They toured nationally in November to coincide with the release of their next album, Live at The Esplanade, recordings of a live performance made ten years earlier on 25 January 1997 at The Esplanade Hotel, Melbourne. The performance had been recorded after Blood discovered the venue had an in-house 24-track recording system shortly before they were due to perform. It is essentially a greatest hits live collection, although it includes two previously unreleased tracks, "Society of Soul" and "The Dead Boys".

Lime Spiders reformed again in December 2008 for three shows at the Harp Hotel in Wollongong, Manly Fisherman's Club, and the Annandale Hotel. Bambach returned, while Tom Corben, the son of Gerard Corben, replaced Lawson on drums. The next line-up of Blood, Bambach, Gerard and Tom Corben, and Sparks, reconvened for an appearance at the Hoodoo Gurus' Dig It Up show in Sydney during 2013. Their track, "Slave Girl" appeared as the theme for ABC-TV's, Paper Giants: Magazine Wars, in June that year.

Mick Blood suffered a brain injury in a pub fight in 2014. The band reformed without him for a one-off benefit show in Sydney on 23 September with a number of guest vocalists, and Celibate Rifles, the Psychotic Turnbuckles, one-time backing vocalist Bill Gibson's band Hey! Charger and an unplugged Dubrovniks among the supports.

In November 2015, the band announced it would play another benefit show at Sydney's Bald Faced Stag Hotel on 23 January 2016 with singer/actor Ripley Hood (Mushroom Planet, Funhouse, The Four Stooges) on vocals as Blood was still not well enough to perform. This show was cancelled several days later after objections from Blood.

In June 2023, Mick Blood has announced the end of Lime Spiders, as he can no longer enjoy existing in music with the intense scrutiny of social media. saying "As you may realise, I've finally given up the rock 'n' roll circus after a highly successful international career with the Lime Spiders, the band I formed 43 years ago. I no longer enjoyed the intense scrutiny, made worse these days by 'social' media. Random people posting dodgy footage taken on a phone & hurtful comments from online trolls were the last straw. The music scene isn't as immediate & real as it was back in the day, providing a perfect outlet for these cowardly types."

== Members ==
=== Members ===
- Mick Blood – Vocals (1979–2023)
- Ray Floyd Jones - Lead Guitar (2019-2023)
- Paul Zoob - Bass (2023)
- Richard Lawson – Drums (1983–1985, 1986–1992, 1997, 2007)
- Dave Sparks – Guitar (1997–2002, 2007–2017)
- Phil Hall – Bass (1988–1997, 2007, 2017)
- Jeff Cleary – Drums (1981–1982)
- Mike Couvret – Guitar (1988)
- Warwick Gilbert – Bass (1982)
- Eric Grothe – Guitar (1979)
- Dave Guest – Bass (1981–1982)
- Richard Jakimyszyn – Guitar (1981–1984, 1985, 2007)
- Peter Cann – Guitar (1991)
- Luke Mason – Drums (1992)
- Darryl Mather – Guitar (1979–1982)
- Jayne Murphy – Guitar (1992)
- Stephen Rawle – Drums (1982–1984)
- Murray Shepherd – Drums (2002)
- Clint Mahoney - Bass (2019)
- Paul Mulreany - Drums (2019)
- Spike Glover - Drums (2020)
- Bruce Tatham – Keyboards (1982)
- Tom Gorban - Drums (2008 - 2014)
- Mark Wilkinson – Guitar (1988–1989)

== Discography ==
=== Studio albums ===
List of studio albums, with Australian chart positions
Title	Album details	Peak chart positions		
Title	Album details	AUS	US CMJ	UK Indie
Slave Girl	Released: 1985; Label: Closer (CL0034)	—	—	18
The Cave Comes Alive!	Released: April 1987; Label: Virgin (VOZ 2006)	54	11	—
Volatile	Released: May 1988; Label: Virgin (VOZ 2015)	—	—	—
Beethoven's Fist	Released:1990; Label: Virgin (VOZ 2043)	—	—	—

=== Live albums ===
List of live albums, with selected details
Title	Album details
Lime Spiders Live	Released: November 1997; Label: Virgin
Live at the Esplanade	Released: 2007; Label: Figtree Words & Music (FT102)

=== Compilation albums ===
List of compilation albums, with selected details
Title	Album details
Headcleaner	Released: 1987; Label: Virgin (VOZ 2012)
Blood Sugar Sex Lawson	Released: 1992; Label: Virgin (VOZEPCD 003)
Nine Miles High 1983-1990	Released: 2002; Label: Raven (RVCD-144)

=== Extended Plays ===
List of EPs, with selected details
Title	Details	Peak chart positions	
Title	Details	AUS	UK Indie
Weirdo Libido	Released: 1987	48	29

== Awards and nominations ==
=== ARIA Music Awards ===
The ARIA Music Awards is an annual awards ceremony that recognises excellence, innovation, and achievement across all genres of Australian music. They commenced in 1987.

Year	Nominee / work	Award	Result	Ref.
1988	Lime Spiders	Best New Talent	Nominated	

== See also ==
- Raspberry Cordial
