= Treasure Planet (disambiguation) =

Treasure Planet is a 2002 American animated film.

Treasure Planet may alsor refer to:

- Treasure Planet (1982 film), a Bulgarian animated film
- Treasure Planet (soundtrack), the soundtrack album to the 2002 film
- Treasure Planet: Battle at Procyon, a video game inspired by the 2002 film
