= Notbroken =

Single by Goo Goo Dolls

from the album Something for the Rest of Us
- Released: November 8, 2010
- Genre: Alternative rock
- Length: 4:10
- Label: Warner Bros
- Songwriter: John Rzeznik
- Producer: Tim Palmer

Goo Goo Dolls singles chronology
"Home" (2010)	"Notbroken" (2010)	"All That You Are" (2011)

"Notbroken" is a song by the Goo Goo Dolls. It is the second single from their ninth studio album, Something for the Rest of Us, which was released on August 31, 2010. It was announced on Goo Goo Dolls' official website that "Notbroken" would be the second single from the new album.

== Meaning ==
It has been stated at many shows on the Something for the Rest of Us Tour that "Notbroken" is about a wife writing a letter to her husband who is at war. He fears that she will no longer love him because of his physical and emotional changes while in battle. The song indicates that the woman will always love her husband, regardless of the war's effect on him.

== Music video ==
The minimalist music video was directed by Mexican director Carlos López Estrada and features the band performing while a woman writes to her soldier, an officer in the army. Her letter is carried overseas by a postman and reaches the husband in time before he goes out to fight on the battlefield. The tense war scene goes hand-in-hand as the band performs intensely and many soldiers die. The husband is shot and seems to die, only for the ending of the video to show him returning to his waiting wife, wounded but 'not broken'.

== Track listing ==
No.	Title	Writer(s)	Length
1.	"Notbroken"	John Rzeznik	4:10
2.	"As I Am (Live)"	John Rzeznik	4:17

== Charts ==
Chart (2010–11)	Peak position
US Bubbling Under Hot 100 (Billboard)	19
US Adult Pop Airplay (Billboard)	26
US Rock Digital Songs (Billboard)	11
