= Scarlet White =

American rock band

- Origin: Three Rivers, Michigan
- Genres: Christian rock, alternative rock, alternative metal, post-grunge, hard rock
- Years active: 2008–2018
- Label: Independent
- Members: Spencer Minor; Dan Hall; Erica Wallen

Scarlet White was an American rock band formed in Three Rivers, Michigan, United States, in 2008, by guitarist, Dan Hall and vocalist, Spencer Minor. Hall was in several bands prior to Scarlet White, getting his passion for music after attending a Creed concert. After many line up attempts, Scarlet White consists of Dan Hall, Spencer Minor, and Erica Wallen. Scarlet White has released two studio albums, Scarlet White and The Inbetween. The Inbetween was recorded at GCR Audio Recording Studios in Buffalo, New York, owned by Robby Takac of the Goo Goo Dolls. The band released their third and final studio album in November 2017 titled The Other Side. The Other Side was also recorded at GCR Audio.

The band also released its first music video to the song "Worthy" in October 2015. "Worthy" peaked at #3 on the Billboard Christian Rock chart.

== History ==
=== Breathe ===
Released on December 20, 2011. This was the EP pre-release to Scarlet White's self-titled full-length album, released under the Transform Music Group Label.

=== Scarlet White ===
Released on September 10, 2012. It was recorded at Red Red Studios in Nashville, Tennessee with producer and recording engineer Joshua Silverberg. This album featured Breathe which spent five weeks in the Christian AC Top 40 and Running Through the Storm which made it to number 22 on Billboard's Christian Rock Radio Chart, and stayed in the top 30 for 17 weeks.

=== The Inbetween ===
Released on October 14, 2014. The Inbetween was recorded at GCR Audio Recording Studios in Buffalo, New York by lead audio engineer Justin Rose; orchestrations were written by composer Richie English. four singles have been released from the album and have done well on Christian Rock radio charts. Never Met stayed on for 15 weeks peaking at #8. Wake of the King spent 22 weeks on the charts, eight of those in the Top 5, six in the Top 3 and peaked at #1 in the country; it moved to the Recurrent Chart on January 28, 2015, where it remained for twenty weeks. It has reached a listening audience of over 500,000 in the US alone. Fire debuted at #24 on BDS Christian Rock on March 11, 2015, and spent 18 weeks on the chart peaking at #8. "Worthy" debuted at #17 and peaked at #3, spending several weeks on the charts at well.

=== Memory Finds You ===
Single recorded in November 2015 with Jeremy Holderfield from Seventh Day Slumber, released February 2, 2016.

=== The Other Side ===
Released November 14, 2017. Recorded in Buffalo, NY at GCR Audio Recording Studio. The album was produced by guitarist, Dan Hall. The engineering team includes Justin Rose and Nathan Winter. Mixed by Mike Langford. String composition by Richie English. Three singles have already been released, Lost in the Smoke, One Less, and Silence. Lost in the Smoke hit top 30 on Neilsen BDS Christian Rock Charts and spent several weeks there, peaking in the top 20. The third single, Silence, reached number 7 on Neilsen BDS Christian Rock Charts. It has also been in the top 10 for 10 weeks.

=== Death of Spencer Minor ===
On Sunday, July 28, 2019, Spencer Minor was involved in a motorcycle accident on US 131 in St. Joseph County, Michigan. He was non responsive to resuscitation being given by firefighters and was announced deceased on scene.

== Members ==
- Spencer Minor - Lead vocalist (2008–2018; Deceased 2019)
- Dan Hall - Guitars (2008–2018)
- Erica Wallen - Bass guitar (2014–2018)
- Noah Russell - Drums (touring 2016-2018)
- Jacob Hendricks - Drums (2008-2015)
- Dango Cellan - Drums (touring 2015, studio 2017)
- Bradley Preston - Bass (2014)

== Discography ==
Studio albums

- Scarlet White (2012)
- The Inbetween (2014)
- The Other Side (2017)

Extended plays

- Breathe (2011)

== Album reviews ==
=== Breathe ===
- Last.FM

=== Scarlet White ===
- HM Magazine Pick of the Litter
- Bryan Forester Review
- Listen to the Mitten

=== The Inbetween ===
- New Release Tuesday
- Jesusfreakhideout
- Jesuswired
- Contrast Control
