= Only One (Goo Goo Dolls song) =

Single by Goo Goo Dolls

from the album A Boy Named Goo
- Released: February 1995
- Recorded: 1994
- Genre: Power pop
- Length: 3:18
- Label: Warner Bros.
- Songwriter: John Rzeznik

Goo Goo Dolls singles chronology
"We Are the Normal" (1993)	"Only One" (1995)	"Flat Top" (1995)

Only One is a song by the Goo Goo Dolls. A power pop track, It was the first single released from their 1995 breakthrough album A Boy Named Goo. The single was also released in a limited edition pink vinyl with "Slave Girl" and "Disconnected" on the B-side.

In Australia and Germany, the song was released as a CD single, with non-album track "Hit or Miss" and the fifth track from A Boy Named Goo, "Impersonality", appearing instead.

== Track listing ==
=== U.S. Single ===
1. "Only One" - 3:18
2. "Slave Girl" - 2:17
3. "Disconnected" - 3:00

=== German Single ===
WBR 43543

1. "Only One" (radio edit) - 3:09
2. "Impersonality" - 2:43
3. "Hit Or Miss" - 2:44

== Charts ==
Chart (1995)	Peak position
US Alternative Airplay (Billboard)	36
US Mainstream Rock (Billboard)	21
