= All That You Are (Goo Goo Dolls song) =

Single by Goo Goo Dolls

from the album Transformers: Dark of the Moon – The Album
- Released: June 14, 2011
- Genre: Alternative rock
- Length: 3:12
- Label: Reprise
- Songwriters: John Rzeznik, John Shanks
- Producer: John Shanks

Goo Goo Dolls singles chronology
| "Notbroken" (2010) | "All That You Are" (2011) | "Rebel Beat" (2013) |

"All That You Are" is a song recorded by American alternative rock band the Goo Goo Dolls included in the Transformers: Dark of the Moon soundtrack, which was released on June 14, 2011. "All That You Are" was released to the Apple iTunes Store on June 14, 2011, the same day the soundtrack was released. Also Linkin Park and Paramore released their singles for the film, "Iridescent" and "Monster" respectively. This is the second song the Goo Goo Dolls have made for a Transformers film with the first being "Before It's Too Late (Sam and Mikaela's Theme)", which was made for Transformers.

== Reception ==
"All That You Are" peaked at number 16 on the "Adult Pop songs" chart and peaked at number 17 on the Bubbling Under Hot 100 chart.

IGN said, "All That You Are is horribly out of its league, as lifeless vocals sputter through clunky tune", in their review of the Transformers: Dark of the Moon soundtrack. Sputnik Music said, "it can just barely be considered a highlight", in their review of the soundtrack.

== Track listing ==
1. "All That You Are" - 3:12

== Charts ==
| Chart (2011) | Peak position |
|---|---|
| US Adult Pop Airplay (Billboard) | 16 |
| US Bubbling Under Hot 100 (Billboard) | 17 |
