= Naked (Goo Goo Dolls song) =

1996 single by Goo Goo Dolls

Single by Goo Goo Dolls

from the album A Boy Named Goo
- Released: February 6, 1996
- Length: 3:44
- Label: Warner Bros.
- Songwriters: John Rzeznik; Robby Takac
- Producer: Lou Giordano

Goo Goo Dolls singles chronology
"Name" (1995)	"Naked" (1996)	"Long Way Down" (1996)

"Naked" is a song by American rock band Goo Goo Dolls. The song was the fourth single released from their fifth studio album, A Boy Named Goo, and entered the top 50 on the US and Canadian airplay charts.

== Charts ==
=== Weekly charts ===
Chart (1996)	Peak position
Canada Top Singles (RPM)	42
Canada Rock/Alternative (RPM)	10
US Radio Songs (Billboard)	47
US Alternative Airplay (Billboard)	9
US Mainstream Rock (Billboard)	8

=== Year-end charts ===
Chart (1996)	Position
US Mainstream Rock Tracks (Billboard)	45
US Modern Rock Tracks (Billboard)	42
