= There You Are (Goo Goo Dolls song) =

Single by Goo Goo Dolls

from the album Hold Me Up
- Released: 1990
- Recorded: 1990
- Genre: Punk rock, alternative rock
- Length: 3:40
- Label: Metal Blade Records
- Songwriters: John Rzeznik, Robby Takac, George Tutuska

Goo Goo Dolls singles chronology
"There You Are" (1990)	"I'm Awake Now" (1991)

Music video
- "There You Are" on YouTube

"There You Are" is the debut single by the Goo Goo Dolls. It was the trio's first single and first music video released.

It was the first and only single from their third album, Hold Me Up.

== Music video ==
The music video for "There You Are" features the band members playing at Pilot Field in their hometown of Buffalo, New York.

== Track listing ==
1. "There You Are" - 3:07

== Cassette promo track listing ==
1. "There You Are" - 3:07
2. "On Your Side" - 3:05
3. "Sad Letters" by "Junk monkeys" - 3:05
4. "Funhouse" by "Junk monkeys"- ?:??

== Personnel ==
- Johnny Rzeznik–guitar, lead vocals
- Robby Takac–bass guitar
- George Tutuska–drums

== Charts ==
Chart (1991)	Peak position
US Alternative Airplay (Billboard)	24
