= The Cave Comes Alive! =

Studio album by The Lime Spiders
- Released: June 1987
- Recorded: Paradise Studios, Sydney, 1987
- Genre: Alternative rock, garage rock, punk rock
- Length: 37:38
- Label: Virgin
- Producer: David Price

The Lime Spiders chronology
The Cave Comes Alive! (1987)	Volatile (1988)

The Cave Comes Alive! is the first album by The Lime Spiders, released on vinyl in 1987 through Virgin Records.

There were three singles released from the album; "My Favourite Room" b/w "Blood From A Stone", "Just One Solution" b/w "Drip Out", and "Jessica" (New Version) b/w "Sparks" (Live).

"Jessica" (New Version) b/w "Sparks" (Live), and "Long Way to Go" (Live) was released on 12" single.

The 'New Version' of Jessica for the single is shorter (2:55 from 3:40), and the mix and structure has been changed, in particular, piano replaces the fuzz guitar at the start, the guitar solo is shorter, the kick drum is absent, and the song ending has been changed.

"Sparks" by Pete Townshend, is a cover of the instrumental song from The Who's "Tommy" album, and "Long Way to Go" by Michael Bruce, is a cover of the Alice Cooper song from their album "Love It To Death".

A live promotional EP; "Lime Spiders" was also released that contained three songs from the album: "Space Cadet", "Just One Solution", and "Action Woman", along with a cover of "Stone Free" by Jimi Hendrix.

== Background ==
Lime Spiders had split in mid-1985 with founding lead vocalist, Michael Blood, travelling to Europe. They reconvened in September 1986 with the line-up of Blood, Tony Bambach on bass guitar, Gerard Corben on rhythm guitar and Richard Lawson on drums. The group signed with Virgin Records, which issued their non-album single, "Weirdo Libido", in January 1987.

The group's debut album, The Cave Comes Alive!, was recorded with David Price producing and was issued in June 1987. It provided three singles, "My Favourite Room" (May), "Just One Solution" (August) and "Jessica" (October).

== Reception ==
Professional ratings
Review scores
Source	Rating
Allmusic	4.5/5 stars

In November 2012 FasterLouder listed The Cave Comes Alive! at No. 45 of "The Most Underrated Albums of All Time". Their reviewer Max Easton opined, "a collection of forgotten gems from one of the richest veins of Australia’s garage history... a chronically underrated and forgotten record lost in time." David Szatmary of AllMusic rated it at four-and-a-half-out-of-five stars and briefly stated, "This is the snarling debut from the punk quartet who owe a debt to the '60s."

== Track listing ==
1. "My Favourite Room" (Mick Blood) - 3:38
2. "Are You Loving Me More" (Tucker, Mantz) - 2:45
3. "Ignormy" (Blood) - 2:24
4. "NSU" (Jack Bruce) - 2:57
5. "Just One Solution" (Blood) - 2:55
6. "Blood from a Stone" (Blood, Richard Jakimyszyn) - 3:46
7. "Just One Solution (Reprise)" (Blood) - 1:35
8. "Action Woman" (Warren Kendrick) - 2:39
9. "Rock Star" (Anthony Bambach, Blood) - 3:26
10. "Jessica" (Blood) - 3:41
11. "Space Cadet" (Bambach, Blood, Gerard Corben) - 3:30
12. "Theory of Thira" (Blood) - 4:05

== Charts ==
Chart (1987)	Peak position
Australia (Kent Music Report)	54

== Personnel ==
=== The Lime Spiders ===
- Mick Blood - lead vocals
- Gerard Corben - guitars
- Tony Bambach - bass, backing vocals, piano
- Richard Lawson - drums, backing vocals, percussion

=== Additional musicians ===
- Chris Abrahams - Hammond organ
- Jim Zembis - bouzouki on "Theory of Thira"
- Bill Gibson - backing vocals on "My Favourite Room" and "Just One Solution"
