= Something for the Rest of Us =

Studio album by Goo Goo Dolls
- Released: August 28, 2010
- Recorded: 2008–2010
- Genres: Alternative rock; pop rock
- Length: 48:18
- Label: Warner Bros.
- Producers: Tim Palmer; John Fields; Butch Vig

Goo Goo Dolls chronology
Vol.2 (2008)	Something for the Rest of Us (2010)	Magnetic (2013)

Singles from Something for the Rest of Us
- 1. "Home" Released: June 8, 2010; 2. "Notbroken" Released: November 8, 2010

Something for the Rest of Us is the ninth studio album by American rock band Goo Goo Dolls. It was released on August 28, 2010, in Australia and on August 31 in North America through Warner Bros. Records. The recording process took place during the spring to fall of 2009 in the GCR Audio studio in Buffalo and Paramount Studios as well as "the Ark" in Los Angeles, with producer Tim Palmer.

A single had been originally slated to be released in November 2009 with an album release in February 2010, but the band went back into the studio in January 2010. According to lead singer and guitarist John Rzeznik, this was done to make further improvements on what they had previously thought had been a finished record. Several producers were brought in to assist on the production process, including Butch Vig, John Fields, Paul David Hager and Rob Cavallo. Something for the Rest of Us is the third Goo Goo Dolls studio album that Cavallo has produced (Dizzy Up the Girl and Gutterflower). When asked about the length of time between albums, Rzeznik admitted it was a mix of songwriting issues as well as taking time out for personal reasons; "I wanted to really dig deep and there are a million songs I threw away, like, “Nah, it's not good enough. I wanna do something different. I wanna do something better, go deeper. I also wanted to have a life with my girlfriend for a while. I owed it to her to spend some time with her and be normal and be in one place. That was kind of important." In one of the Ustream sessions, Robby revealed that the album would have twelve songs and "Real" is not among them. In late May, John announced that "Home" would be the first single and was released onto radio and iTunes stores on June 8, 2010.

On July 13, 2010, it was announced on the band's fan club website, Inner Machine, that an EP will be available to purchase at all remaining tour dates. The EP is titled Waiting for the Rest of It and it contains 4 new songs from Something for the Rest of Us plus a live recording of "Broadway" from the Something for the Rest of Us Tour.

== Themes ==
In an interview with Star News Online, Rzeznik revealed that the band would explore some of the issues of the present day lyrically;

"Most of the material on the record seems to be addressing the kind of the angst and uncertainty of the times that we're living in, but on an emotional level. One particular song on the album is called “Notbroken.” I got a letter from a woman whose husband was in Iraq. He was injured – paralyzed – and he doesn't want to come home. He wants to stay in the hospital. He's ashamed of himself. He feels like he's less. And she just wants to let him know that he's still everything that she ever wanted. I don't know, it just kind of came out. It's kind of like I was writing a love letter to him on her behalf. These are really hard, trying times. And the way that affects people and their families, people losing their jobs and everything's so insecure, I just wanted to say something about that."

== Reception ==
Professional ratings
Aggregate scores
Source	Rating
Metacritic	59/100
Review scores
Source	Rating
AbsolutePunk.net	(74%)
Allmusic	3/5 stars
BBC Music	(mixed)
Blog Critics	(favorable)
Inner Ear Media	(favorable)
Kerrang!	3/5 stars
Q	3/5 stars
Rolling Stone	2/5 stars
Salt Lake Tribune	(A−)
the stylus	7/10

Something for the Rest of Us has received mixed to favorable reviews. Collating 8 reviews, the review aggregator website Metacritic gave the album an average score of 59%, which indicated a "mixed or average" response.

Stephen Thomas Erlewine of Allmusic awarded the album three stars out of five, opining that the album "delivers in its content if not in its sound." He did offer praise to the albums overall "ambition", summarizing that, "While the band remains much closer to the warm AAA bath that’s become their defining signature, the added ambition does give Something for the Rest of Us variety that’s welcome after the exceedingly pleasant Let Love In."

BBC Music writer Mike Diver gave a mixed review, albeit praising the band for playing to their "established strengths." Despite this, he went on to add that, "So easy on the ear, indeed, that maintaining focus can be difficult. John Rzeznik’s gruff tones are always the scene-stealing element of any track, but when he’s barking out well-worn clichés about love and loss, it’s a task to read between tired lines and hear some heart. Several tracks aren’t so much dripping with weak metaphors as drowning in them."

Blog Critics writer Kirsten Coachman was more receptive in her article on the album. She said that the record was, "proof why the Goo Goo Dolls remain popular with music fans. They know their audience, and even better, they know how to relate to their audience through their music." She praised the band for still being able to "rock a love song", while offering particular praise to album closer "Soldier". She added, "The final song rounds out the album with its lyrics that could make you feel like the song is being sung directly to you."

Inner Ear Media summed up the band's achievements to date in order to judge how the new record holds up. They conclude that the band has been able to consistently produce strong mainstream pop/rock albums over the past decade and that the new album fits in that mold. While it doesn't offer anything revolutionary it solidifies the Goo Goo Dolls' status as one of the world's finest pop/rock bands.

Dan Slessor of Kerrang! magazine was also favorable in his review, awarding the album a "good" three K! score. He wrote that "anthemic American radio rock really doesn't come much better than that of the Goo Goo Dolls." He offered praise for the "giant hooks" found among the songs, as well as the band showing a "ton of heart", despite the "polished" production.

Q magazine also awarded the album three stars out of five, noting "there's enough here to satisfy the faithful, if nothing to enlist new recruits."

Barry Walters of Rolling Stone was more dismissive however, criticizing Rzeznik. He wrote, "frontman John Rzeznik remains an assured singer. But amid his vocal polish is a new sense of strain, and for a band this lightweight, the additional anxiety doesn’t flatter."

Kathy Stephenson, writing for the Salt Lake Tribune, was highly impressed with the album and offered a grade of "A−". She opined that, "All 12 tracks offer the rich themes, smart lyrics and rock-worthy melodies that have made this trio a favorite for more than two decades."

The college at Brockport's student newspaper, the stylus, also gave a positive review. Bryan Montgomery scored the album at seven out of ten. Despite viewing the album as "merely a shadow to the great albums in the past", he praised the songwriting by pointing out that, "With every new album, it seems that [Rzeznik's] writing becomes stronger, and Something For the Rest of Us is an album where the writing is a key piece to what makes the songs sound so good. The sound on the album is truly reminiscent of what the band has become so well-known for in the last few years."

== Track listing ==
All tracks are written by John Rzeznik.

No.	Title	Lyrics	Music	Length
1.	"Sweetest Lie"			3:23
2.	"As I Am"			3:53
3.	"Home"	Rzeznik; Andy Stochansky		4:44
4.	"Notbroken"			4:10
5.	"One Night"			5:01
6.	"Nothing is Real"			4:05
7.	"Now I Hear"	Robby Takac	Takac; Rzeznik	3:20
8.	"Still Your Song"	Rzeznik; Stochansky		4:22
9.	"Something for the Rest of Us"			4:27
10.	"Say You're Free"	Takac	Takac; Rzeznik	3:11
11.	"Hey Ya"		Rzeznik; Tim Palmer	3:37
12.	"Soldier"		Rzeznik; Palmer	4:14

=== Bonus tracks ===
No.	Title	Writer(s)	Length
13.	"Postcards from Paradise" (Flesh for Lulu cover) (iTunes and pre-order bonus track)	Kevin Mills	3:41
14.	"Rough Boys" (Pete Townshend cover) (iTunes and pre-order bonus track)	Pete Townshend	2:38
15.	"Home" (acoustic) (iTunes and pre-order bonus track)	Rzeznik; Stochansky	4:36
16.	"Something for the Rest of Us" (piano version) (Amazon MP3 exclusive bonus track)	Rzeznik	4:19
17.	"Catch Me Now I'm Falling" (The Kinks cover) (pre-order bonus track from googoodolls.com)	Ray Davies	3:52
18.	"Broadway" (live) (Japanese release bonus track)	Rzeznik	6:34

== Personnel ==
Goo Goo Dolls

- Johnny Rzeznik – vocals, acoustic and electric guitars, keyboards
- Robby Takac – bass guitar, vocals
- Mike Malinin – drums, percussion

Additional musicians

- Brad Fernquist – guitars, MPC, backing vocals
- Dave Palmer – keyboards, piano, organ
- Korel Tunador – backing vocals, keyboards, piano
- Ran Jackson – backing vocals
- Ricky Jackson – backing vocals
- Andy Stochansky – backing vocals
- Daphne Chen – violin
- Eric Gorfain – violin
- Lauren Chipman – viola
- Richard Dodd – cello
- Steven Lu – string arrangement and conducting

Production

- Tim Palmer – production (all except "Home" and "Hey Ya"); drums, bass, and keyboard production on "Hey Ya"
- Goo Goo Dolls – additional production
- John Fields – production on "Home"; engineering
- Butch Vig – production on "Hey Ya"
- Paul David Hager – mixing, engineering
- Brad Fernquist – additional production
- Jamie Seyberth – engineering
- Doug McKean – engineering
- Billy Bush – engineering
- Chris Testa – engineering
- Justin Rose – engineering assistance
- Ken Flutier – engineering assistance
- George Gumbs – engineering assistance
- Nicolas Essig – engineering assistance
- Steph Dufresne – engineering assistance
- Stephen Miller – string recording

== Charts ==
Chart (2010)	Peak position
Canadian Albums (Billboard)	20
Irish Albums (IRMA)	67
UK Albums (Official Charts)	36
US Billboard 200	7
