= Volatile (The Lime Spiders album) =

Studio album by The Lime Spiders
- Released: May 1988
- Recorded: Glebe Studios – Sydney; February, 1988
- Genre: Alternative rock, garage rock
- Length: 47:11
- Label: Virgin
- Producer: Peter Blyton

The Lime Spiders chronology
The Cave Comes Alive! (1987)	Volatile (1988)	Headcleaner (1988)

Professional ratings
Review scores
Source	Rating
AllMusic	3/5 stars

Volatile is the second studio album by The Lime Spiders, released in 1988 through Virgin Records on vinyl.

== Track listing ==
1. "Volatile" (Mick Blood, Gerard Corben) – 2:46
2. "Can't Hear You Anymore" (Richard Lawson, Gerard Corben) – 2:37
3. "The Odyssey" (Richard Lawson) – 3:16
4. "Lot to Answer For" (Mick Blood) – 2:15
5. "The Captor & the Captive One" (Tony Bambach) – 3:33
6. "My Main Attraction" (Mick Blood) – 3:21
7. "The Other Side of You" (Mick Blood) – 3:20
8. "Deaf, Dumb and Blind" (Mick Blood) – 2:59
9. "Strange Kind of Love" (Tony Bambach) – 3:00
10. "Under My Umbrella" (Mick Blood) – 2:50
11. "Won't Fall in Love" (Mick Blood) – 3:05
12. "Test Pattern" (Mick Blood) – 4:35

== Personnel ==
=== The Lime Spiders ===
- Mick Blood – lead vocals
- Tony Bambach – bass guitar, backing vocals
- Richard Lawson – drums, percussion, backing vocals
- Gerard Corben – guitars

=== Additional musicians ===
- Phil Graham, Nancy Kiel, Brigid O'Donohue – backing vocals on "Volatile"
