= GCR Audio =

Recording studio in New York, United States

Coordinates: 42°54′7″N 78°52′19.7″W

GCR Audio, formerly known as Trackmaster Audio and Inner Machine Studios, is a recording studio at 564 Franklin Street in Buffalo, New York, United States.

The building itself was originally a carriage house built in 1864, and converted to a Girls' School and Convent in 1890 named St. Mary's Seminary. The Chapel / Meeting room was converted by Alan Baumgardner and Kim Ferullo to a studio space designed by John Storyk of the Walters-Storyk Design Group in 1976, and operated as Trackmaster Audio and later, Ear Candy Audio, until 2000. The space hosted bands and musicians such as Yes, Melanie, Rick James, Ani DiFranco, Mark Russell, and Flaming Lips among others.

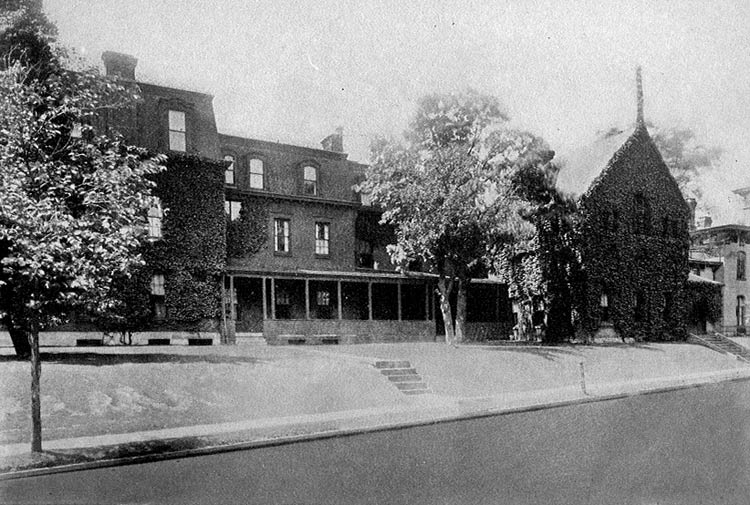
GCR Audio; North street entrance, circa 1900

The complex was redesigned and rebuilt in 2007 by John Rzeznik and Robby Takac of the Goo Goo Dolls. John Storyk and WSDG were brought back to the studio space to redesign the room for modern recording scenarios. The studio was opened as a private recording facility and renamed Inner Machine Studios. The Goo Goo Dolls used the space for recording their 2009 Something for the Rest of Us album with the engineer and record producer, Tim Palmer.

Takac took over the studio operation and opened it to the public as GCR Audio in 2009. Justin Rose is the chief engineer and studio manager. GCR Audio is also home to Jay Zubricky Productions, and Film Kiln Productions.

Some of the major acts who have recording credits at GCR Audio include Lil Wayne, B.o.B, Spyro Gyra, Goo Goo Dolls, Jessie J, Mighty Mighty Bosstones, Shonen Knife, Ian Gillan, Cute is What We Aim For, Moe, Every Time I Die and Michael Franti. Another work recorded there was Tommy Z's album, Blizzard of Blues (2016), which debuted at number 8 in the Billboard Top Blues Albums Chart, and was the only independent record label release on that week's list.
