= I'm Still Here (Jim's Theme) =

Single by John Rzeznik

from the album Treasure Planet (Original Motion Picture Soundtrack)
- Released: 2002
- Genre: Alternative rock
- Length: 4:12
- Label: Walt Disney Records/Warner Bros. Records
- Songwriter: John Rzeznik
- Producers: Rob Cavallo, Jon Lind

John Rzeznik singles chronology
| "I'm Still Here (Jim's Theme)" (2002) | "Always Know Where You Are" (2002) |

"I'm Still Here (Jim's Theme)" is a song written by the Goo Goo Dolls frontman John Rzeznik for the Disney film Treasure Planet. The song was released by Rzeznik as a solo track, which is autobiographical, loosely inspired by Rzeznik's own life growing up in Buffalo, New York. It was a moderately successful pop hit.

== Production ==
John Rzeznik was picked to write the song for the movie because it was believed he could relate well with Treasure Planet's main character, Jim, and his "rebel-with-a-cause angst". Directors Ron Clements and John Musker stated on the film's audio commentary that they had temped a scene in the film using the song "Iris" by Rzeznik's band the Goo Goo Dolls. Referring to Jim, Rzeznik said, "It was easy to relate to Jim, you know? I felt a lot like that when I was his age."

"I'm Still Here" is one of two songs on the Treasure Planet soundtrack performed by Rzeznik; the other being "Always Know Where You Are". The song was sung by Rzeznik during the film, but performed by BBMak on the soundtrack.

== Music video ==
A music video was created that featured a young man in front of changing scenery all the while Rzeznik is appearing alongside him. The young man and Rzeznik are seen running throughout the video towards Treasure Planet and away from the young man's arguing parents; Scroop, one of the villains from the movie, in silhouette; and the destruction of the planet. The end of the video depicts Rzeznik walking down a road.

== Critical reception ==
The BBC described it as one of two pop songs "strangely detached from [the] workmanlike and inoffensive" soundtrack, and "an attempt to extend the soundtrack's appeal to an older, rockier audience". It described the song as "sandpaper-voiced... heavy-rock, angsty teen anthem... updating the traditional pre-pubescent Disney hero". DVDDizzy wrote, "It is a great song for the movie, but I found the music video boring and hardly worth watching again."

== Charts ==
Chart performance for "I'm Still Here (Jim's Theme)"
| Chart (2002) | Peak position |
|---|---|
| Australia (ARIA) | 68 |
| US Adult Top 40 (Billboard) | 10 |
| US Hot 100 Airplay (Billboard) | 16 |
| US Top 40 Tracks (Billboard) | 38 |
| US Bubbling Under Hot 100 (Billboard) | 5 |
| US Radio & Records Hot AC | 43 |
