= Beethoven's Fist =

Studio album by The Lime Spiders
- Released: 17 October 1990
- Recorded: Rhinoceros Rich & Sun Studios, Sydney
- Genre: Alternative rock
- Length: 34:57
- Label: Virgin
- Producer: Kevin "Caveman" Shirley

The Lime Spiders chronology
Headcleaner (1988)	Beethoven's Fist (1990)	Lime Spiders Live (1997)

Professional ratings
Review scores
Source	Rating
AllMusic	2/5 stars

Beethoven's Fist is the third studio album by The Lime Spiders. It was released in 1990 through Virgin Records.

== Track listing ==
1. "Scene of the Crime" (Mick Blood, Gerard Corben) – 4:11
2. "Cherry Red" (Mick Blood, Phil Hall) – 2:44
3. "Real Thing" (Mick Blood, Phil Hall, C Morrow) – 3:56
4. "9 Miles High" (Mick Blood, Phil Hall) – 2:59
5. "I Get Off at the Next Stop" (Mick Blood) – 5:14
6. "This Time" (Mick Blood) – 3:52
7. "Silent Partner" (Mick Blood, Gerard Corben) – 2:30
8. "Old Dog New Tricks" (Mick Blood) – 2:34
9. "Three Wise Men" (Mick Blood, Richard Lawson) – 3:24
10. "Miss Perfect Strange" (Mick Blood, Gerard Corben) – 3:35

== Personnel ==
=== Lime Spiders ===
- Mick Blood – vocals
- Gerard Corben – guitars
- Richard Lawson – drums, vocals
- Phil Hall – bass guitar

=== Additional musicians ===
- Mark Wilkinson – guitar
