= Goo Goo Dolls (album) =

Studio album by Goo Goo Dolls
- Released: June 9, 1987
- Recorded: 1986–1987
- Studio: Trackmaster Audio (Buffalo, New York)
- Genres: Hardcore punk; punk rock
- Length: 34:00
- Labels: Mercenary; Celluloid; Metal Blade
- Producer: Goo Goo Dolls

Goo Goo Dolls chronology
Goo Goo Dolls (1987)	Jed (1989)

Alternative cover
- Reissue cover

Professional ratings
Review scores
Source	Rating
Allmusic	2/5 stars

Goo Goo Dolls (also known as First Release and Made to Be Broken) is the debut studio album by American rock band Goo Goo Dolls, released on June 9, 1987 by Mercenary and Celluloid Records. All of the songs were sung by bassist Robby Takac, who was originally the band's lead vocalist. The album was recorded from late 1986 to early 1987 on a $750 budget at Trackmaster Audio in the band's hometown of Buffalo, New York. Later on, the band admitted in their 1999 VH1 Behind the Music special that the album was recorded under the influence of alcohol and drugs; Rzeznik stated, "[We had] a lot of beer, a lot of truck stop speed, a lot of pot...[I] don't remember a lot of it."

On December 15, 2013, the album was reissued by Charly Acquisitions as Made to Be Broken on digital-streaming services. The album contains the track listing in a different order from the original.

== Track listing ==
All tracks are written by the Goo Goo Dolls, except where noted.

No.	Title	Writer(s)	Length
1.	"Torn Apart"		2:05
2.	"Messed Up"		1:49
3.	"Living in a Hut"		2:40
4.	"I'm Addicted"		2:58
5.	"Sunshine of Your Love" (Cream cover)	Eric Clapton; Jack Bruce; Pete Brown	2:48
6.	"Hardsores"		1:31
7.	"Hammerin' Eggs (The Metal Song)"		2:27
8.	"Don't Fear the Reaper" (Blue Öyster Cult cover)	Donald Roeser	2:18
9.	"Beat Me"		2:26
10.	"Scream"		1:50
11.	"Slaughterhouse"		3:38
12.	"Different Light"		2:04
13.	"Come On"		2:14
14.	"Don't Beat My Ass (With a Baseball Bat)"		3:12

== Personnel ==
Goo Goo Dolls

- Robby Takac – vocals, bass
- Johnny Rzeznik – guitar
- George Tutuska – drums

Additional musician

- Jim Albert – piano

Production

- Goo Goo Dolls – production
- Jim Albert – engineer
- M. Sak – engineer
- J. Caruso – engineer
- K. Rona – engineer
- Nancy J. Brennan – photography, design
