= Headcleaner (album) =

Compilation album by The Lime Spiders
- Released: 1988
- Genre: Alternative rock
- Length: 43:28
- Label: Virgin
- Producer: Rob Younger; Tom Miser; Cameron Allan; David Price

The Lime Spiders chronology
Volatile (1998)	Headcleaner (1988)	Beethoven's Fist (1990)

Headcleaner is a sixteen-track compilation album by Australian alternative rock band the Lime Spiders, issued in 1988 by Virgin Records. It compiled all their singles and B-sides up to that point in a single package. It was initially released on music cassette before appearing on vinyl LP (1989) and CD.

== Reception ==
Professional ratings
Review scores
Source	Rating
AllMusic	4.5/5 stars

== Track listing ==
No.	Title	Writer(s)	Producer(s)	Length
1.	"25th Hour"	Mick Blood, Darryl Mather	Rob Younger	3:11
2.	"Can't Wait Long"	Blood, Richard Jakimyszyn	Tom Misner, Lime Spiders	3:17
3.	"Slave Girl"	Blood, Jakimyszyn	Misner, Lime Spiders	2:50
4.	"Out of Control"	Richard Lawson, Blood, Gerard Corben, Tony Bambach	Younger	3:15
5.	"That's How It Will Be" (cover version of Liberty Bell's 1967 track)	Ronald Keith Tanner	Younger	2:30
6.	"1-2-5" (cover of the Haunted's 1966 track)	Robert Burgess, Jurgen Peter	Misner, Lime Spiders	2:12
7.	"Beyond the Fringe"	Blood, Jakimyszyn	Misner, Lime Spiders	2:33
8.	"Save My Soul" (cover of Wimple Winch's 1966 track)	Demetrius Christopholus, John Kelman	Younger	2:52
9.	"Weirdo Libido"	Blood, Mather	Cameron Allan	3:38
10.	"Here with My Love"	Blood, Darryl Mather	Allen	2:32
11.	"I Heard Her Call My Name" (cover of Velvet Underground's 1968 track)	Lou Reed	David Price	3:41
12.	"Drip Out"	Blood	Price	2:28
13.	"I Was Alone" (cover version of the Exotics' 1967 track)	Frank Sutton, Jerry Atchley		1:47
14.	"Mr Soul" (incorrectly attributed to J. Spellazza, C. Ramsey)	Neil Young		2:43
15.	"Time of Day" (cover version of the Remains' 1966 track)	Barry Tashian		1:56
16.	"My Flash on You" (cover version of Love's 1966 track)	Arthur Lee		1:53

== Credits ==
Lime Spiders

- Mick Blood – lead vocals
- Gerard Corben – guitar
- Tony Bambach – bass guitar
- Richard Lawson – drums
- Richard Jakimyszyn – guitar
- Darryl Mather – guitar
- Stephen Rawle – drums

Production work

- Cameron Allan – producer (tracks: 9, 10)
- David Price – producer (tracks: 11, 12)
- Lime Spiders – producer (tracks: 2, 3, 6, 7)
- Tom Misner – producer (tracks: 2, 3, 6, 7)
- Rob Younger – producer (tracks: 1, 4, 5, 8)
