= Real (Goo Goo Dolls song) =

Single by Goo Goo Dolls

from the album AT&T TEAM USA Soundtrack
- Released: July 2, 2008
- Genre: Alternative rock
- Length: 3:25
- Label: Warner Bros. Records
- Songwriter(s): John Rzeznik, Gregg Wattenberg
- Producer(s): Gregg Wattenberg

Goo Goo Dolls singles chronology
"Before It's Too Late (Sam and Mikaela's Theme)" (2007)	"Real" (2008)	"Home" (2010)

Music video
- "Real" on YouTube

"Real" is a song by the Goo Goo Dolls that is featured on the AT&T Team USA Soundtrack, a compilation containing exclusive tracks by different artists to benefit and encourage the U.S. Olympic Team. The song was also released on July 2, 2008 to iTunes stores, with the exception of stores in the U.S., Canada, Australia and New Zealand. The song was later released onto the remaining iTunes stores on August 8, 2008, coinciding with the start of the 2008 Beijing Olympics.

John changed the first line of the lyrics to "You read the news, the stories never change" in the live versions he played after the Europe 2008 tour, probably because the original line also appears in Stay With You: "These streets, turn me inside out".

== Track listing ==
- iTunes Single
1. "Real" - 3:26

== Charts ==
Chart (2008)	Peak position
US Billboard Hot 100	92
US Adult Pop Airplay (Billboard)	39
