= Transformers: Dark of the Moon – The Album =

Soundtrack album by Various artists
- Released: June 14, 2011
- Recorded: 2009–2011
- Genres: Alternative rock; alternative metal; hard rock; post-grunge
- Length: 39:29 (standard edition)
- Label: Reprise
- Producers: Randy Spendlove; Livia Tortella

Singles from Transformers: Dark of the Moon – The Album
- 1. "Iridescent" Released: May 27, 2011; 2. "Monster" Released: June 7, 2011; 3. "All That You Are" Released: June 14, 2011

Transformers: Dark of the Moon – The Album is a compilation album of various artists music from the 2011 film Transformers: Dark of the Moon. The first official single from the album is the radio edit version of "Iridescent" by Linkin Park. The second single released for the film is "Monster" by Paramore. The third single released is "All That You Are" by Goo Goo Dolls. The score was released digitally 10 days after the album. U2 song "North Star" was used in the movie.

== Track listing ==
No.	Title	Artist(s)	Length
1.	"Iridescent" (Radio Edit)	Linkin Park	3:59
2.	"Monster"	Paramore	3:20
3.	"The Only Hope for Me Is You"	My Chemical Romance	4:32
4.	"Faith (When I Let You Down)"	Taking Back Sunday	3:08
5.	"The Bottom"	Staind	4:21
6.	"Get Thru This"	Art of Dying	2:43
7.	"All That You Are"	Goo Goo Dolls	3:12
8.	"Head Above Water"	Theory of a Deadman	3:32
9.	"Set the World on Fire"	Black Veil Brides	3:40
10.	"Awake and Alive"	Skillet	3:29
11.	"Just Got Paid" (ZZ Top cover)	Mastodon	3:33

UK / European edition exclusive
No.	Title	Artist(s)	Length
12.	"House On Fire"	Beatsteaks	3:51

iTunes deluxe edition exclusive
No.	Title	Artist(s)	Length
12.	"Many Of Horror"	Biffy Clyro	4:10
13.	"The Pessimist"	Stone Sour	3:22
14.	"Goodbye - Gate 21" (Rock Remix)	Serj Tankian featuring Tom Morello	3:39
15.	"North Star"	U2	2:36
16.	"Sweet Emotion"	Aerosmith	4:35

GameStop exclusive
No.	Title	Artist(s)	Length
12.	"Lifelong Dayshift"	Middle Class Rut	4:28
13.	"Graveyard Dancing"	D.R.U.G.S.	3:01

Russian exclusive
No.	Title	Artist(s)	Length
12.	"House on Fire"	Beatsteaks	3:51
13.	"Many of Horror (When We Collide)"	Biffy Clyro	4:17
14.	"The Pessimist"	Stone Sour	3:23
15.	"Goodbye — Gate 21" (Rock Remix)	Serj Tankian featuring Tom Morello	3:39
16.	"Lifelong Dayshift"	Middle Class Rut	4:28
17.	"Graveyard Dancing"	D.R.U.G.S.	3:01
18.	"Burning in the Skies"	Linkin Park	4:13
19.	"Running Blind" (Transformers Remix)	t.A.T.u.	3:51

== Usage in the film ==
Despite the numerous songs contributed to the soundtrack, only six songs from the album are used in the film. "All That You Are" is played during the scene where Shia LaBeouf's character Sam Witwicky is at work. U2's "North Star" is briefly played at the start of the scene where Sam Witwicky visits his girlfriend's office. Aerosmith's "Sweet Emotion" played during a montage of Sam's job interviews. "Iridescent"'s intro is played during the scene when Sam rides through the devastated Chicago city. "Iridescent", "Monster" and "Many of Horror" are used at the end credits.

== Reception ==
Chad Grischow of IGN gave a favorable review of the album, saying the album has "few too many tracks here you likely have lurking elsewhere on your iPod and not enough new treats to wholly recommend" but assures the listener "will definitely find pieces here worth saving from the scrap heap."

Irving of Sputnikmusic described it as "shiny and heartless as its predecessors, the compilation features cut after cut of tunes carelessly prepared by a loose collection of knuckle-dragging rock outfits who were either always unbelievably mediocre or are already way past their prime", but believed Mastodon's cover of "Just Got Paid" to have "enough purposeful kitsch present herein to at least send Music From Transformers: Dark of the Moon out on a non-sour note."

Professional ratings
Review scores
Source	Rating
Allmusic	3/5 stars
IGN	7.5/10
Sputnikmusic	2.0/5
