= Treasure Planet (soundtrack) =

2002 soundtrack album by James Newton Howard and John Rzeznik

Treasure Planet (An Original Walt Disney Records Soundtrack)

Film score by James Newton Howard and John Rzeznik
- Released: November 19, 2002
- Recorded: 2002
- Genres: Rock; pop; classical
- Length: 58:10
- Label: Walt Disney
- Producer: Chris Montan

James Newton Howard chronology
The Emperor's Club (2002)	Treasure Planet (2002)	Dreamcatcher (2003)

Treasure Planet (An Original Walt Disney Records Soundtrack) is the soundtrack album to the 2002 animated science fiction action-adventure film Treasure Planet. The album features seventeen tracks – fifteen tracks from the score composed by James Newton Howard, and also featured two pop singles: "I'm Still Here" and "Always Know Where You Are". Walt Disney Records released the film's soundtrack album on November 19, 2002. The film's score received positive critical reception, with praise directed on Howard's composition.

== Background ==
The film marked Howard's third collaboration with Walt Disney Animation Studios; he previously scored for Dinosaur (2000) and Atlantis: The Lost Empire (2001). The music from the film is largely orchestral in nature. Howard said that the score is "very much in the wonderful tradition of Korngold and Tiomkin and Steiner." The score has been described as a mixture of modern "classical style" music in the spirit of Star Wars and Celtic music. Scottish fiddler Alasdair Fraser is credited as the co-composer of the track "Silver Leaves", and is also listed as a soloist in the film's credits.

The music includes two moderately successful pop singles — "I'm Still Here" and "Always Know Where You Are". The Goo Goo Dolls frontman John Rzeznik performed both the tracks in the film version, whereas the latter was recorded by the British pop-rock group, BBMak, which was featured in the soundtrack.

Originally, Alan Silvestri was supposed to compose the film's score, but he dropped out of the project and went on to score another film for Walt Disney Animation Studios, Lilo & Stitch (also 2002). Jerry Goldsmith, who previously worked with the studio on Mulan (1998), was also considered to compose the score.

== Track list ==
No.	Title	Performer(s)	Length
1.	"I'm Still Here"	John Rzeznik	4:12
2.	"Always Know Where You Are"	BBMak	3:19
3.	"12 Years Later"		2:44
4.	"To The Spaceport"		1:55
5.	"Rooftop"		2:32
6.	"Billy Bones"		2:24
7.	"The Map"		0:58
8.	"Silver"		2:39
9.	"The Launch"		2:42
10.	"Silver Comforts Jim"		3:23
11.	"Jim Chases Morph"		3:17
12.	"Ben"		2:30
13.	"Silver Bargains"		2:59
14.	"The Back Door"		4:18
15.	"The Portal"		5:04
16.	"Jim Saves The Crew"		4:37
17.	"Silver Leaves"		5:11

== Reception ==
Writing for BBC, Jack Smith stated "James Newton Howard's score is firmly in the old-fashioned escapade mould, more swash and buckle than Space Odyssey. It is, perhaps, less of a tribute to the music's descriptive powers than a result of the familiarity of Disney's musical conventions that the listener feels they would be able to guess the plot without ever having seen the film [...] This soundtrack is certainly workmanlike and inoffensive, but there's little buried treasure awaiting anyone digging beneath the surface." Jason Ankeny of Allmusic wrote "Treasure Planet is pure Disney formula, balancing rousing action, cornball comedy, and bittersweet romance in bold, broad strokes. What sets it apart from its predecessor is the presence of Gaelic whistles and fiddles, as well as a fiery electric guitar that adds a dash of rock & roll to Howard's otherwise conventional symphonic sensibilities. The problem with Treasure Planet is the problem that plagues all contemporary Disney scores, and that's the mind-numbing predictability of the music's emotional arc." Filmtracks.com wrote "[James Newton] Howard's score is about as predictable as it could be, but it is enjoyable even so, launching Erich [Wolfgang] Korngold's bold style from The Sea Hawk to a place where no sailing score had gone before." A. O. Scott of The New York Times called the score as "treacle-dipped sea-chanty-on-steroids".

== Personnel ==
Credits adapted from Allmusic

Songs

- David Campbell – string arrangement (track 1)
- Chris Chaney – bass (track 1)
- Paul Bushnell – bass (track 2)
- Gary Novak – drums (track 1)
- Abe Laboriel Jr. – drums (track 2)
- Jamie Muhoberac – keyboards (tracks 1–2)
- Luis Conte – percussion (track 1)
- John Rzeznik – singer-songwriter, guitar (tracks 1–2)
- Greg Suran – guitar (track 2)
- Tim Pierce – guitar (track 2)
- Andrew Scheps – programmer
- Carmen Rizzo – programmer
- Jon Lind – associate producer
- Cheryl Jenets – production coordinator
- Ken Allardyce – recording
- Allen Sides – recording
- Tom Lord-Alge – mixing
- Ted Jensen – mastering
- Brett Allen – guitar technician
- Doug McKean – Pro Tools
- Eric Ferguson – Pro Tools

Score

- James Newton Howard – composer, producer, orchestrator
- Alasdair Fraser – additional music (track 7), solo fiddles
- Jim Weidman – score producer
- Rob Cavallo – music producer
- James T. Hill – electronic score producer
- Shawn Murphy – recording, mixing
- Dave Collins – mastering
- Phil Ayling – solo whistles
- Eric Rigler – solo whistles, bagpipes
- Nick Ingman – choir conductor
- Pete Anthony – orchestra conductor, orchestrator
- Brad Dechter – orchestrator
- Jeff Atmajian – orchestrator
- Jon Kull – orchestrator
- Jenny O'Grady – concertmaster
- Kira Lewis – additional engineering
- David Marquette – assistant recordist, scoring crew
- Chris Barrett – scoring crew
- Jake Jackson – scoring crew
- Jay Selvester – scoring crew
- Koji Egawa – scoring crew
- Marc Gebauer – scoring crew
- Chris Montan – executive producer
- Richard Grant – Auricle Control Systems technician
- Luis M. Fernandez – art direction
- Federico F. Tio – creative art direction
- John Blas – artwork
- Eric Tan – album design
- Marcella Wong – album design

== International versions ==
French
No.	Title	Writer(s)	Artist(s)	Length
1.	"Un Homme Libre"	Eric Chemouny	David Hallyday	03:43

Italian
No.	Title	Writer(s)	Artist(s)	Length
1.	"Ci Sono Anch'Io"	Max Pezzali	Max Pezzali	03:43

Spanish
No.	Title	Writer(s)	Artist(s)	Length
1.	"Sigo Aqui"	Maria Ovelar	Alex Ubago	03:41

Scandinavian
No.	Title	Artist(s)	Length
1.	"Jag Finns Kvar"	Jimmy Jansson of Poets
2.	"Jag Er Her"	Tarjei Van Ravens
3.	"Jeg Står Fast"	Jimmy Jørgensen

Portuguese
No.	Title	Artist(s)	Length
1.	"Eu Estou Aqui (Tema De Jim)"	Rogério Flausino de Jota Quest

Dutch
No.	Title	Writer(s)	Artist(s)	Length
1.	"Ik Ben Hier"	John Rzeznik	Joost Zweegers	03:43
2.	"Ik Ben Nog Steeds Hier"	John Rzeznik	Martijn Hagens	03:42

== Release history ==
Region	Date	Format(s)	Label	Catalog Code	Ref.
United States	19 November 2002	CD	Walt Disney Records	60799-7	
Canada	19 November 2002	CD	Walt Disney Records	D15607997	
United Kingdom	25 November 2002	CD	Walt Disney Records	5050466-1797-2-2	
France	27 November 2002	CD	Walt Disney Records	5050466-1381-2-5	
Italy	27 November 2002	CD	Walt Disney Records	5050466-1381-2-5	
Spain	27 November 2002	CD	Walt Disney Records	5050466-1381-2-5	
Netherlands	30 November 2002	CD	Walt Disney Records	5050466-1381-2-5	
Brazil	2002	CD	Walt Disney Records	05008607997	
Brazil	2002	CD	Walt Disney Records	5050466363121	
Scandinavia	3 December 2002	CD	Walt Disney Records	5050466-1379-2-0	
Australia	28 November 2002	CD	Walt Disney Records	336102	
New Zealand	28 November 2002	CD	Walt Disney Records	336102	
Japan	9 July 2003	CD	Walt Disney Records	AVCW-12342	
Japan	3 October 2018	CD	Walt Disney Records	UWCD-8046	
Indonesia	2002	Cassette	Walt Disney Records	60799-0	
Malaysia	2002	Cassette	Sony Music	60799-4	

== Charts ==
Chart (2002)	Peak position
UK Albums (OCC)	39
US Soundtrack Albums (Billboard)	11
