= Home (Goo Goo Dolls song) =

Single by Goo Goo Dolls

from the album Something for the Rest of Us
- Released: June 8, 2010
- Genre: Alternative rock
- Length: 4:44 (album version); 3:49 (radio edit)
- Label: Warner Bros.
- Composer: John Rzeznik
- Lyricists: John Rzeznik; Andy Stochansky
- Producer: John Fields

Goo Goo Dolls singles chronology
"Real" (2008)	"Home" (2010)	"Notbroken" (2010)

Music video
- "Home" on YouTube

"Home" is a song by the Goo Goo Dolls. It is the lead single from their ninth studio album, Something for the Rest of Us, which was released on August 31, 2010. "Home" was released to the Apple iTunes Store on June 8, 2010.

== Music video ==
There are 2 versions of the video.

Version 1: The video begins with the band sitting on the table while people are eating at the table when they are frozen except for the band. After Johnny sang the chorus, he leaves the table and the scene shifts to a Japanese marketplace where the band are seen playing through the aisles and appeared on a recording camera. At the end of the video, the band ends up back at the table where they sat by the people.

Version 2: A music video was filmed for the song and featured a young woman wandering around a city at different times of the day, sometimes walking the streets or sitting in a bedroom, alone. The video emphasizes the loneliness and desperation behind the song's lyrics.

== Track listing ==
No.	Title	Writer(s)	Length
1.	"Home"	John Rzeznik, Andy Stochansky	4:44
2.	"Broadway (Live)"	John Rzeznik	6:34

=== Other versions ===
No.	Title	Writer(s)	Length
1.	"Home (Radio Edit)"	John Rzeznik, Andy Stochansky	3:49
2.	"Home (Acoustic) (iTunes & Pre-Order Bonus Track)"	John Rzeznik, Andy Stochansky	4:36

== Charts ==
=== Weekly charts ===
Chart (2010)	Peak position
Korea (GAON)	57
US Bubbling Under Hot 100 (Billboard)	10
US Adult Pop Airplay (Billboard)	9

=== Year-end charts ===
Chart (2010)	Position
US Adult Top 40 (Billboard)	32
