= Superstar Car Wash =

Studio album by Goo Goo Dolls
- Released: February 23, 1993
- Recorded: August–October 1992
- Studios: Metalworks, Mississauga, Ontario; Trackmaster Recording, Buffalo, New York; Master Control, Burbank, California
- Genres: Alternative rock; power pop; punk rock
- Length: 44:25
- Label: Warner Bros.
- Producer: Gavin MacKillop

Goo Goo Dolls chronology
Hold Me Up (1990)	Superstar Car Wash (1993)	A Boy Named Goo (1995)

Singles from Superstar Car Wash
- 1. "We Are the Normal" Released: April 22, 1993

Superstar Car Wash is the fourth studio album by American rock band Goo Goo Dolls, released on February 23, 1993 on Warner Bros. Records. John Rzeznik wrote the song "We Are the Normal" with his idol, The Replacements' singer Paul Westerberg. The two corresponded by mail but never sat in a studio together. The song "Fallin' Down" was featured in the 1993 Pauly Shore movie Son in Law. Also, the song "So Far Away" was originally written and recorded with the title "Dancing In Your Blood"; the song had the same basic structure, but different lyrics, more minimal instrumentation, and a slightly different melody.

Superstar Car Wash was an actual car washing business on William Street just outside the downtown region of Buffalo, the hometown of the band.

Remixed versions of songs "Fallin' Down", "Another Second Time Around", "Cuz You're Gone", "We Are The Normal", "Girl Right Next To Me", "Lucky Star", and "On The Lie" appear in the 2001's compilation What I Learned About Ego, Opinion, Art & Commerce. These mixes sound slightly different from their original versions, with crisper and clearer background noises, such as accompanying acoustic guitars and choruses which have been emphasized.

== Musical style ==
Billboard described the album's sound as a mix of punk rock, pop and metal. The New York Times thought that the album mostly "[remained] in familiar power-pop territory", but also had "occasional ventures toward metal or punk." Buffalo News called the album an "alternative-pop masterpiece", stating that the band had "taken their heavy metal, punk and garage rock roots and combined them with a softer pop style." Vice described the album as simply hard rock.

== Reception ==
Professional ratings
Review scores
Source	Rating
AllMusic	4/5 stars
Entertainment Weekly	(A)
Rock Hard	8/10
Chicago Tribune	3.5/4 stars

The album was met with highly positive critical reception. AllMusic gave the album four-out-of-five stars saying that the band let loose and channeled their playful immaturity throughout the attractive impurity of this album." Entertainment Weekly gave the album an 'A' rating. Rock Hard rated the album 8-out-of-10, saying that the band "have an arrow in their quiver that might hit the mark this time." The Chicago Tribune gave the album a 3.5/4.

== Track listing ==
All songs written by The Goo Goo Dolls (Johnny Rzeznik, Robby Takac and George Tutuska) except when noted.

No.	Title	Writer(s)	Length
1.	"Fallin' Down"	Rzeznik	3:18
2.	"Lucky Star"		3:06
3.	"Cuz You're Gone"	Rzeznik	3:31
4.	"Don't Worry"		2:25
5.	"Girl Right Next to Me"	Rzeznik	3:44
6.	"Domino"		2:37
7.	"We Are the Normal"	Rzeznik, Takac, Tutuska, Paul Westerberg	3:38
8.	"String of Lies"		3:08
9.	"Another Second Time Around"		3:01
10.	"Stop the World"	Rzeznik	3:32
11.	"Already There"		2:45
12.	"On the Lie"	Rzeznik	3:18
13.	"Close Your Eyes"		2:25
14.	"So Far Away"		3:57

== Personnel ==
Goo Goo Dolls

- Johnny Rzeznik – guitar, lead and backing vocals
- Robby Takac – bass, backing and lead vocals
- George Tutuska – drums, art direction

Additional personnel

- Frank Luterec – band photography
- Gavin MacKillop – recording, mixing, production, leaf photography
- Stephen Marcussen – mastering at Precision Mastering
- Brad Nelson – assistant engineering
- Deborah Norcross – design
- Matt Pakucko – assistant engineering, mixing
- Armand John Petri – instrumentation
- Mary Ramsey – viola on "We Are the Normal"
- Merlyn Rosenberg – cover and building photography
- Joe Rozler – instrumentation
- Leslie Wintner – design

== Charts ==
Chart performance for Superstar Car Wash
Chart (1993)	Peak Position
US Heatseekers Albums (Billboard)	35
