= A Boy Named Goo =

Studio album by Goo Goo Dolls
- Released: March 14, 1995
- Recorded: 1994
- Studios: BearTracks Studios, Suffern, NY and Trackmaster Studios, Buffalo, NY
- Genres: Alternative rock; power pop; post-grunge; punk rock
- Length: 42:14
- Labels: Warner Bros.; Metal Blade
- Producers: Lou Giordano, Goo Goo Dolls

Goo Goo Dolls chronology
Superstar Car Wash (1993)	A Boy Named Goo (1995)	Bang! (1997)

Singles from A Boy Named Goo
- 1. "Only One" Released: February 1995; 2. "Flat Top" Released: June 12, 1995; 3. "Name" Released: September 26, 1995; 4. "Naked" Released: January 1996; 5. "Long Way Down" Released: March 1996

A Boy Named Goo is the fifth studio album by American rock band Goo Goo Dolls, released in 1995 on Warner Bros. and Metal Blade Records. The album was a commercial success, and was certified double-platinum by the RIAA within a year of its release. This is the last Goo Goo Dolls album with George Tutuska on drums; he was replaced by Mike Malinin just before the album was released.

Professional ratings
Review scores
Source	Rating
AllMusic	4.5/5 stars
Chicago Tribune	2.5/4 stars
Encyclopedia of Popular Music	4/5 stars
The Philadelphia Inquirer	3.5/4 stars
The Rolling Stone Album Guide	2.5/5 stars

== History ==
This album is the Goo Goo Dolls' first studio album to not have 14 tracks. The song "Stand Alone" was written by George Tutuska, and because John Rzeznik didn't want to exploit Tutuska’s efforts after his dismissal, the song was only included on a promo version of the album. On the wide-release version, it is replaced with "Disconnected" and "Slave Girl", which were initially B-sides to the "Only One" single. On the same promo, "Ain't That Unusual" was labeled as "Someday". The two replacement songs are covers of songs by defunct Buffalo and Sydney punk bands The Enemies and Lime Spiders.

The song "Name" is well known as the Goo Goo Dolls' first hit. According to lead singer John Rzeznik, the song's unusual composition came about "quite accidentally". Rzeznik says it was written about Lisa Kennedy Montgomery (known as Kennedy). She was an MTV VJ from 1992 to 1997.

This album also marked the band's last with Metal Blade Records.

== Walmart controversy ==
On June 5, 1996, the band's label, Warner Bros., released a statement claiming that Walmart had decided to stop selling A Boy Named Goo because some Walmart customers had complained that the album cover was offensive. The statement claimed that some customers had incorrectly thought that the child on the cover was smeared in blood rather than blackberry juice. Walmart acknowledged that they had decided to stop selling the album, but denied Warner Bros.'s claim that this was because of complaints about the cover art, instead ascribing the decision to weak sales. Of the reports that Walmart customers had thought that the child on the cover was smeared in blood, Rzeznik said, "The name of the album is A Boy Named Goo. The picture is of a boy covered with goo. What part of this concept are they unclear on?"

== Track listing ==
All songs written by John Rzeznik, except where noted.

No.	Title	Writer(s)	Length
1.	"Long Way Down"		3:28
2.	"Burnin' Up"	Rzeznik, Robby Takac, George Tutuska	2:29
3.	"Naked"		3:43
4.	"Flat Top"		4:30
5.	"Impersonality"	Rzeznik, Takac, Tutuska	2:41
6.	"Name"		4:30
7.	"Only One"		3:18
8.	"Somethin' Bad"	Rzeznik, Takac, Tutuska	2:30
9.	"Ain't That Unusual"		3:19
10.	"So Long"	Rzeznik, Takac, Tutuska	2:33
11.	"Eyes Wide Open"	Rzeznik, Takac, Tutuska	3:56
12.	"Disconnected" (The Enemies cover)	Joe Bompczyk, Bob Guariglia, Pete Secrist, Fred Suchman	3:00
13.	"Slave Girl" (Lime Spiders cover)	Mick Blood, Richard Jakimyszyn	2:17

=== Advanced copy track listing ===
The track listing for advance copies—before George Tutuska was fired from the band—was slightly different. Neither of the covers were present, and another original song written solely by Tutuska, "Stand Alone", was featured.

No.	Title	Writer(s)	Length
1.	"Long Way Down"		3:39
2.	"Burnin' Up"	Rzeznik, Takac, Tutuska	2:29
3.	"Naked"		3:44
4.	"Flat Top"		4:30
5.	"Impersonality"	Rzeznik, Takac, Tutuska	2:40
6.	"Name"		4:31
7.	"Only One"		3:18
8.	"Something Bad"	Rzeznik, Takac, Tutuska	2:31
9.	"Someday"		3:22
10.	"So Long"	Rzeznik, Takac, Tutuska	2:33
11.	"Stand Alone"	Tutuska	3:43
12.	"Eyes Wide Open"	Rzeznik, Takac, Tutuska	3:57

== Covers and media appearances ==
Metalcore band Haste the Day covered the song "Long Way Down" for their album When Everything Falls. "Ain't That Unusual" was featured on the soundtrack of the 1995 film Angus. A remix of the song "Long Way Down" was featured on the soundtrack of the 1996 film Twister.

== Personnel ==
Goo Goo Dolls

- John Rzeznik – guitar, lead and backing vocals
- Robby Takac – bass, backing vocals, lead vocals (2, 5, 8, 10, 12)
- George Tutuska – drums

Technical personnel

- Lou Giordano – producer, engineer, and mixing (1–11)
- Steve Regina – assistant engineer (1–11)
- Ted Jensen – mastering (1–11)
- Rob Cavallo – producer (12, 13)
- Goo Goo Dolls – producer (12, 13)
- Jerry Finn – engineer (12, 13)
- John Matousek – mastering (12, 13)
- Armand John Petri – pre-production and arrangement assistance

== Charts ==
=== Weekly charts ===
Chart (1995–1996)	Peak position
Canada Top Albums/CDs (RPM)	15
US Billboard 200	27

Chart (2025)	Peak position
Hungarian Physical Albums (MAHASZ)	38

=== Year-end charts ===
Chart (1996)	Position
US Billboard 200	62

== Certifications and sales ==
Region	Certification	Certified units/sales
Canada (Music Canada)	Platinum	100,000^{^}
United States (RIAA)	2× Platinum	2,000,000^{^}
^{^} Shipments figures based on certification alone.
