= Hold Me Up =

Studio album by Goo Goo Dolls
- Released: October 16, 1990
- Recorded: May 1990
- Studio: Trackmaster Audio, Buffalo, New York
- Genre: Punk rock; power pop; alternative rock
- Length: 39:32
- Label: Metal Blade
- Producer: Armand John Petri

Goo Goo Dolls chronology
| Jed (1989) | Hold Me Up (1990) | Superstar Car Wash (1993) |

Singles from Hold Me Up
- 1. "There You Are" Released: 1990

Professional ratings
Review scores
| Source | Rating |
|---|---|
| AllMusic | 3/5 stars |
| Christgau's Consumer Guide | (neither) |
| The Encyclopedia of Popular Music | 3/5 stars |
| Entertainment Weekly | A− |
| The New Rolling Stone Album Guide | 3/5 stars |

Hold Me Up is the third studio album by American rock band Goo Goo Dolls, released on October 16, 1990, by Metal Blade Records. It marked the beginning of John Rzeznik's emergence as the band's principal lead vocalist. The album features the band's first single "There You Are," which became their first music video as well. In 2017, Loudwire listed the album as one of Metal Blade's best albums.

== Track listing ==
All tracks are written by the Goo Goo Dolls, except when noted.

| No. | Title | Writer(s) | Length |
|---|---|---|---|
| 1. | "Laughing" | | 3:41 |
| 2. | "Just the Way You Are" | | 3:08 |
| 3. | "So Outta Line" | | 2:22 |
| 4. | "There You Are" | | 3:07 |
| 5. | "You Know What I Mean" | | 3:24 |
| 6. | "Out of the Red" | | 1:40 |
| 7. | "Never Take the Place of Your Man" | Prince | 3:49 |
| 8. | "Hey" | | 2:51 |
| 9. | "On Your Side" | | 3:04 |
| 10. | "22 Seconds" | | 0:40 |
| 11. | "Kevin's Song" | | 3:09 |
| 12. | "Know My Name" | | 2:42 |
| 13. | "A Million Miles Away" | Peter Case; Joey Alkes; Chris Fradkin | 2:44 |
| 14. | "Two Days in February" | | 3:11 |

== Personnel ==
Goo Goo Dolls

- Johnny Rzeznik – guitar, backing vocals, lead vocals on tracks 2, 4, 5, 13, and 14, co-lead vocals on track 8
- Robby Takac – bass guitar, backing vocals, lead vocals on tracks 1, 3, 6, 9, and 12, co-lead vocals on track 8
- George Tutuska – drums, lead vocals on track 10

Additional musicians

- Lance Diamond – lead vocals on track 7
- Joe Rozler – horn arrangements and keyboards on track 11

Technical personnel

- Armand John Petri – production, engineering
- Michael Sak – engineering
- Joe Brescio – mastering

== Just the Way You Are EP ==
An EP featuring the studio version of the title song and three live tracks from "Hold Me Up" was released in 1991.

| No. | Title | Length |
|---|---|---|
| 1. | "Just the Way You Are" | 3:08 |
| 2. | "Just the Way You Are" (Live in Nashville) | 3:13 |
| 3. | "Hey" (Live in Nashville) | 2:32 |
| 4. | "You Know What I Mean" (Live in Nashville) | 3:24 |
