= George Tutuska =

American drummer

George Tutuska (born February 27, 1965, in Buffalo, NY) is an American musician, best known as the former drummer of the alternative rock band Goo Goo Dolls. He grew up in South Buffalo with four sisters. He attended Medaille College in Buffalo, and was studying to become an English teacher. That was also where he met Robby Takac and formed the Sex Maggots (later named Goo Goo Dolls) with one of Takac’s friends, John Rzeznik.

Along with being the drummer for the band for nearly 10 years, Tutuska was a primary lyricist for all five albums he contributed to. In this article, John Rzeznik explains that he wrote (or perhaps co-wrote) the lyrics to “James Dean” and “Road To Salinas”; both songs are from the Goo Goo Dolls’ second record, “Jed” released in 1989. Also, according to these articles; Tutuska and Rzeznik wrote “You Know What I Mean” together. Off the same record, Hold Me Up, released in 1990, Tutuska penned “There You Are”, the Goo Goo Dolls' first single, about his girlfriend, whom he had just broken up with at the time.

Later on in his career with the Goo Goo Dolls, he wrote “Already There” with Robby for their fourth studio album “Superstar Car Wash” released in 1993. He also completely wrote the song “Stand Alone” which was only featured on the promotional version of the fifth studio album the Dolls released, A Boy Named Goo.

== Life and career ==
Tutuska is from Buffalo, New York. He is of Irish and Hungarian descent, and he is married with two children.

=== Goo Goo Dolls ===
Tutuska played drums with the Goo Goo Dolls from 1985 to 1994.

==== Departure ====
Prior to Tutuska's departure from the Goo Goo Dolls, there was a payment dispute between him and long-time friend and singer/guitarist John Rzeznik over Tutuska's contribution to the writing of the Superstar Car Wash single "Fallin' Down". During the completion of A Boy Named Goo, Tutuska had told band management that he would not tour behind the album unless royalties were to be split evenly among the three members, a practice Tutuska said had been the band's standard practice ever since the release of its self-titled debut in 1987. Tutuska has said that when he told Rzeznik he had not received royalties from "Fallin' Down", Rzeznik admitted that he had been receiving such royalties for two years.

Just before A Boy Named Goo's release, Tutuska left the band and was replaced by Mike Malinin.

=== Post-Goo Goo Dolls ===
During the 2000s, Tutuska played drums for a local South Buffalo based Celtic Rock band named Jackdaw. The band broke up in 2009.
