= The Haunted (Canadian band) =

Canadian garage rock band

- Origin: Montreal, Quebec, Canada
- Genres: Garage rock, proto-punk
- Years active: 1965–1971
- Labels: Quality (1966); Trans-World (1967-68); Jet (1968)
- Website: thehaunted.com

The Haunted were a Canadian garage rock band from Montreal, Quebec. The band was formed by Jurgen Peter (guitar) in 1965, and went on to release several records before finally disbanding in 1971. They were among the first Canadian bands to achieve a level of success in their musical genre.

== History ==
In 1965, Jurgen Peter joined up with Bob Burgess (vocals), Pierre Faubert (lead guitar), Glenn Holmes (bass), and Peter Symes (drums) to form The Haunted. Besides Jurgen Peter, the other constant band member through most of its six-year history was Al Birmingham. The band membership that recorded the band's best known song, "1-2-5" was composed of Al Birmingham (lead guitar), Jurgen Peter (rhythm guitar), Bob Burgess (vocals), Mason Shea (bass), and Dave Wynne (drums).

The band's first big break came after winning a Battle of the Bands at the Montreal Forum in 1965, beating such competitors as David Clayton-Thomas and the Shays. The first prize was studio time, bankrolled by Quality Records, that they used to record the two songs on their first single, "1-2-5", with "Eight O'Clock This Morning" as the B-side. The executives at Quality Records were enthusiastic about "1-2-5" but objected to the original lyrics, so a "clean" version with different lyrics was also recorded. The single (with the alternate "clean" lyrics) was released on Quality in early 1966. The first pressing of this record had the band name misprinted as "The Hunted". Ironically, the later pressings with the band's name correctly spelled, are now more difficult to locate.

The single achieved substantial local success, then broke nationally, making the Canadian version of the national charts (RPM Weekly Magazine.) The song gained enough attention in the United States to attract a US release of the single on the Amy record label, who released the original "uncensored" version. Several more singles, as well as a self-titled album over the next two years, served to increase their popularity. Their final single, "Vapeur Mauve" is a French language version of Jimi Hendrix's "Purple Haze".

The band grew to be one of the most in demand bands in Canada for the balance of the 1960s and into the early 1970s. Symes decided to fold the band in 1971, commenting as follows: "We were the most sought after and highest paid Canadian band for many years. When I folded the band in 1971, I had to cancel a whole year of advance bookings and it cost me a fortune in lawyer's fees to get out of some of them."

Subsequent to the breakup of the band, control of the band's name appears to have been lost. As of 1996, the name is most closely associated with a Swedish heavy metal band.

== Reissues ==
Bomp!, on their Voxx label released two albums of music by The Haunted in 1983, in their series Rough Diamonds on garage bands having more than just a few songs available. A 22-song CD called The Haunted was released by Voxx in 1995. These albums were made from existing and well worn vinyl records. However, the Voxx CD is still the easiest way to get all of The Haunted's 1960s catalog. In 2009, the Quebec-based reissue label, Hungry for Vinyl, re-issued the 1967 Trans-World LP. This is the first legitimate re-issue of the re-mastered album in its original form. The pressing was limited to 1000 copies.

== Discography ==
=== Studio albums ===
Year	Title	Label
1967	The Haunted	Trans-World 6701 (Reissued 2009 by Hungry For Vinyl)

=== Compilations ===
Year	Title	Label
1983	Return from the Grave	Voxx VXM 200.012 (12" Vinyl)
1983	Part Two: I'm Just Gonna Blow My Little Mind to Bits	Voxx VXM 200.013 (12" Vinyl)
1995	The Haunted	Voxx VCD 2012 (CD)

=== Singles ===
Year	Title	Label
1966	"1-2-5" / "Eight O'Clock in the Morning" (#23 CAN)	Quality 1814 (Can) / Amy 959 (US)
1966	"I Can Only Give You Everything" / "No More Lovin'" (#62 CAN)	Quality 1840
1967	"Searching for My Baby" / "A Message to Pretty"	Trans-World 1674
1967	"Come On Home" / "Out of Time"	Trans-World 1682
1968	"Land of Make Believe" / "An Act of Leisure"	Trans-World 1702
1968	"Mona" / "I'm Gonna Blow My Little Mind to Bits"	Jet 4002
1968	"Vapeur Mauve" (Purple Haze) / "Pourquoi" (Talk Talk)	Marque XII 7001
