= We Are the Normal =

Single by Goo Goo Dolls

from the album Superstar Car Wash
- B-side: "Another Second Time Around"
- Released: April 22, 1993
- Genre: Alternative rock; power pop
- Length: 3:39
- Label: Metal Blade; Warner Bros.
- Songwriters: John Rzeznik; Robby Takac; George Tutuska; Paul Westerberg
- Producer: Gavin MacKillop

Goo Goo Dolls singles chronology
"I'm Awake Now" (1991)	"We Are the Normal" (1993)	"Only One" (1995)

"We Are the Normal" is a song by the Goo Goo Dolls. It was the only single from their fourth album Superstar Car Wash, which allowed them to collaborate with one of their primary influences, Paul Westerberg formerly of The Replacements. The song was a minor success for the Goo Goo Dolls, managing to hit number 5 on the US Modern Rock chart.

Like many of the early Goo Goo Dolls singles, "We Are the Normal" was released in a promotional one-track format only.

== Writing and composition ==
Westerberg co-wrote the track, which is notable for its dynamic range: soft instrumental passages in which a mournful yet melodic viola is interwoven with acoustic guitars; driving, electrified verses in which John Rzeznik's vocals are delivered with a twisted blend of urgency and apathy; and a soaring, anthemic chorus. Rzeznik wrote the music and sent it to Westerberg on a cassette, and Westerberg wrote the lyrics based on the music.

== Charts ==
Chart (1993)	Peak position
US Alternative Airplay (Billboard)	5
