= Jed (album) =

Studio album by Goo Goo Dolls
- Released: February 22, 1989
- Studio: Trackmaster Audio, Buffalo, New York
- Genre: Punk rock
- Length: 34:16
- Label: Metal Blade
- Producer: Goo Goo Dolls; Armand John Petri

Goo Goo Dolls chronology
Goo Goo Dolls (1987)	Jed (1989)	Hold Me Up (1990)

Professional ratings
Review scores
Source	Rating
Allmusic	2.5/5 stars

Jed is the second studio album by American rock band Goo Goo Dolls, released on February 22, 1989 by Metal Blade Records. It was the band's first album in which John Rzeznik sang vocals for some of the tracks; the majority of the songs are sung by Robby Takac, with Rzeznik taking over for two ("Up Yours" and "James Dean"). The album was named after painter Jed Jackson, who was Robby Takac's art teacher at Medaille College and who painted the cover artwork, which is entitled "Arkansas Sunset".

== Track listing ==
All tracks are written by the Goo Goo Dolls, except where noted.

No.	Title	Writer(s)	Length
1.	"Out of Sight"		2:10
2.	"Up Yours"		1:37
3.	"No Way Out"		2:39
4.	"7th of Last Month (Or Iggy The Cat Gets A Bath)"		3:08
5.	"Love Dolls"		2:07
6.	"Sex Maggot"		1:56
7.	"Down on the Corner" (Creedence Clearwater Revival cover)	John Fogerty	3:24
8.	"Had Enough"		2:48
9.	"Road to Salinas"		2:39
10.	"Em Elbmuh"		1:01
11.	"Misfortune"		1:59
12.	"Artie"		2:43
13.	"Gimme Shelter" (The Rolling Stones cover)	Mick Jagger; Keith Richards	2:14
14.	"James Dean"		3:51

== Personnel ==
Goo Goo Dolls

- Robby Takac – lead vocals, bass guitar
- Johnny Rzeznik – guitar, backing vocals, lead vocals on "Up Yours" and "James Dean"
- George Tutuska – drums

Additional musician

- Lance Diamond – lead vocals on "Down on the Corner"

Technical personnel

- Goo Goo Dolls – production
- Armand John Petri – production, mixing
- Mike Sak – engineering
