= Name (song) =

1995 single by Goo Goo Dolls

Single by Goo Goo Dolls

from the album A Boy Named Goo
- B-side: "Burnin' Up"; "Hit or Miss"
- Released: September 26, 1995
- Genre: Alternative rock; post-grunge
- Length: 4:30 (album version); 4:03 (single edit); 4:15 (2007 re-recording)
- Label: Metal Blade; Warner Bros.
- Songwriter: John Rzeznik
- Producer: Lou Giordano

Goo Goo Dolls singles chronology
"Flat Top" (1995)	"Name" (1995)	"Naked" (1996)

Music video
- "Name" on YouTube

"Name" is a song by American rock band Goo Goo Dolls. It was released in September 1995 by Metal Blade and Warner Bros. Records as the third single from their fifth studio album, A Boy Named Goo (1995). "Name" became the band's first major hit, topping both the US Modern Rock Tracks chart and the Album Rock Tracks chart. In the US, it also reached number five on both the Billboard Hot 100 and Cash Box Top 100 charts. In Canada, "Name" peaked at number two on the RPM 100 Hit Tracks chart and number one on the RPM Alternative 30.

== Composition ==
The song's unusual guitar tuning, D-A-E-A-E-E, is accomplished by replacing the B string with a high E string. In an interview with Guitar World Magazine, the singer and songwriter Johnny Rzeznik explained: "Both the top strings are high E strings. Whenever I tried tuning a regular B string up to E, it would pop. It was really tough on the tension. I've seen guys play 'Name' with regular tuning. It doesn't sound right." Rzeznik says that the song's unusual composition happened "quite accidentally". In an interview with KFOG, he explained: "It was weird, I was just sitting on my couch randomly twisting the tuning pegs, and I couldn't figure out what notes the guitar was tuned to, so I had to grab my tuner to find out, and then I jotted them down on a post it. ... I just sat there and let my fingers play the fretboard openly, and that is what became the progression of 'Name'."

In her book The Kennedy Chronicles, former MTV VJ Kennedy claimed that the song was actually about her complicated relationship with Rzeznik, with the lyrics referring to their time together and her full name being a secret to most. Rzeznik admitted to the inspiration in the book, saying, "I was trying to capture a moment...it was pretty interesting to have a song inspired by a moment. And I thought it was a very sweet song."

Rzeznik acknowledged "Name" is inspired by Kennedy's life and personality in a 2025 interview with Zach Sang.

== Reception ==
In October 2012, "Name" was ranked number 24 on Billboard's "Top 100 Pop Songs 1992–2012" chart. This chart also featured the Goo Goo Dolls' hits "Slide" (ranking at number nine) and "Iris" (which topped the chart). The Goo Goo Dolls are the only musicians to have three songs chart on the list, two breaking the top 10 and all three falling within the top 25. They are also the only musicians who have back to back singles ("Iris", 1998 and "Slide", 1999) featured on the list.

== Track listings ==
US cassette single and Australian maxi-CD single

A1. "Name" – 4:29
B1. "Burnin' Up" – 2:29
B2. "Hit or Miss" – 2:43

European CD single

1. "Name" – 4:29
2. "Nothing Can Change You" – 3:11
3. "I Wanna Destroy You" – 2:34

Japanese CD single

1. "Name"
2. "Burnin' Up"
3. "Falling Down"
4. "Naked"

== Charts ==
=== Weekly charts ===
Weekly chart performance
Chart (1995–1996)	Peak position
Australia (ARIA)	64
Canada Top Singles (RPM)	2
Canada Adult Contemporary (RPM)	8
Canada Rock/Alternative (RPM)	1
European Alternative Rock (Music & Media)	5
Hungary Airplay (Music & Media)	14
Iceland (Íslenski Listinn Topp 40)	35
New Zealand (Recorded Music NZ)	43
Quebec Airplay (ADISQ)	7
US Billboard Hot 100	5
US Adult Alternative Airplay (Billboard)	3
US Adult Contemporary (Billboard)	5
US Adult Pop Airplay (Billboard)	2
US Alternative Airplay (Billboard)	1
US Mainstream Rock Airplay (Billboard)	1
US Pop Airplay (Billboard)	2
US Cash Box Top 100	5

=== Year-end charts ===
1995 year-end chart performance
Chart (1995)	Position
Canada Top Singles (RPM)	36
US Album Rock Tracks (Billboard)	32
US Modern Rock Tracks (Billboard)	5

1996 year-end chart performance
Chart (1996)	Position
Brazil (Crowley)	51
Canada Top Singles (RPM)	24
Canada Adult Contemporary (RPM)	64
US Billboard Hot 100	24
US Adult Contemporary (Billboard)	25
US Adult Top 40 (Billboard)	5
US Mainstream Rock Tracks (Billboard)	32
US Modern Rock Tracks (Billboard)	89
US Top 40/Mainstream (Billboard)	7

== Certifications ==
Certifications
Region	Certification	Certified units/sales
Canada (Music Canada)	Platinum	80,000^{‡}
New Zealand (RMNZ)	Platinum	30,000^{‡}
United States (RIAA)	2× Platinum	2,000,000^{‡}
^{‡} Sales+streaming figures based on certification alone.

== Release history ==
Release dates and formats
Region	Date	Format(s)	Label(s)	Ref.
United States	September 5, 1995	Contemporary hit radio	Metal Blade; Warner Bros.	
United States	September 26, 1995	—N/a	Metal Blade; Warner Bros.	
Australia	November 27, 1995	CD	Warner Bros.	
Japan	May 25, 1996	CD	Metal Blade; Warner Bros.	

== See also ==
- List of number-one mainstream rock hits (United States)
- Number one modern rock hits of 1995
- List of RPM Rock/Alternative number-one singles (Canada)
