= Robby Takac =

American rock bassist and vocalist (born 1964)

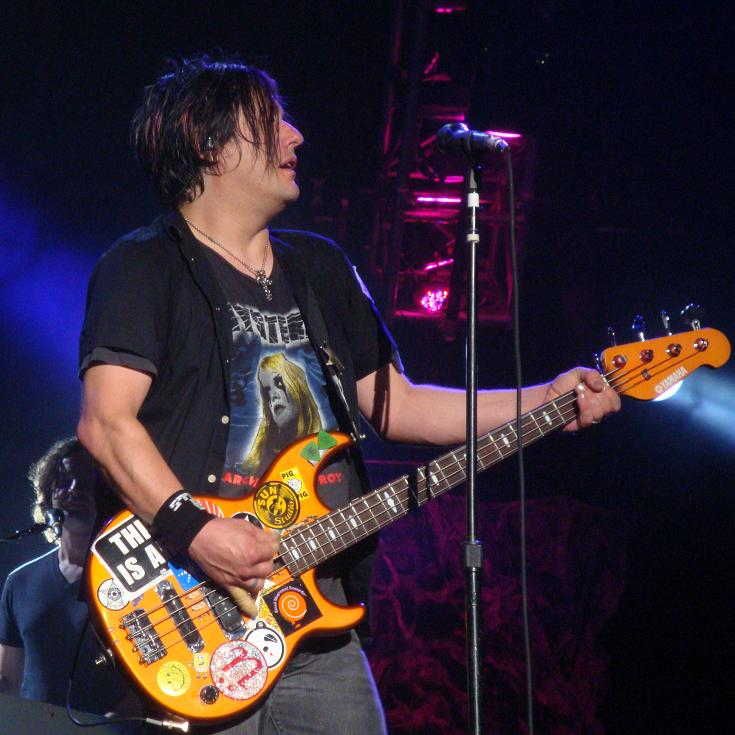
- Takac performing at Molson Amphitheatre on July 25, 2010

Background information
- Born: Robert Carl Takac Jr. September 30, 1964 (age 62); Buffalo, New York, U.S.
- Origin: Buffalo, New York, United States
- Genres: Alternative rock, punk rock
- Occupations: Bassist, singer, songwriter
- Instruments: Bass, vocals
- Years active: 1985–present
- Labels: Metal Blade, Warner Music, Warner Bros., Good Charamel Records
- Website: www.googoodolls.com

Robert Carl Takac Jr. (born September 30, 1964) is an American rock bassist and vocalist. Takac is one of the founding members of the Goo Goo Dolls, along with John Rzeznik.

== Background ==
Takac was born Robert Carl Takac Jr. on September 30, 1964 in Buffalo, New York and grew up in the Buffalo suburb of West Seneca with his parents and younger sister. His mother was a school teacher and Irish Catholic. His father was half-Irish and half-Hungarian. This is reflected by his name. His surname was originally written as Takács, which is Hungarian for 'weaver'. He graduated from West Seneca East Senior High School in 1982. He graduated from Medaille College in 1986 with a Communication degree, with a focus on radio broadcasting.

== Music career ==
Takac began his musical career as a member of the rock band Monarch, prior to joining the Beaumonts, which broke up in 1985. He met guitarist John Rzeznik through the Beaumonts and together they found a drummer, George Tutuska and started a band that they named the "Sex Maggots", with Takac as the lead singer and bassist. In 1986, they changed their name to the more promotable "Goo Goo Dolls", and after three albums moved Rzeznik to the majority of lead vocals. In late 1994, Takac and Rzeznik fired Tutuska and in early 1995 hired Mike Malinin as a replacement. Later that year they received their first commercial success with the single "Name". The 1998 follow-up "Iris" reached number one on several charts, including the Hot 100 Airplay. Goo Goo Dolls have been releasing music and touring continuously since.

In 2009, the band recorded Something for the Rest of Us in Buffalo, New York, at their studio Inner Machine Studios. That year, Takac opened the studio to the public as GCR Audio.

=== Side projects ===
In 2003, Takac joined with Brian Schulmeister to form the dance music collective Amungus. That same year, Takac started his own record label, Good Charamel Records, in Buffalo, New York. With an initial focus on local acts, the first three bands signed to the label were Klear, The Juliet Dagger, and Last Conservative. Today the label primarily releases J-Rock music in North America by female-fronted bands such as Shonen Knife, Tsushimamire, LazyGunsBrisky, Pinky Doodle Poodle and MOLICE.

== Philanthrophy ==
In 2004, Takac founded the Music is Art Festival, a not-for-profit organization, and operates as their president. MiA seeks to explore and reshape music's cultural, social, and educational impact on the community. MiA hosts a number of programs, concerts, and events throughout the year, ranging from collecting and donating instruments to local schools, mental health awareness tours, music industry education, among others.

From 2008 to 2012, Takac served on the Board of Trustees of his alma mater, Medaille College.

== Equipment ==
Takac primarily plays Yamaha BB-series bass guitars, but he has also played Fender and Zon bass guitars.

== Discography ==
=== Goo Goo Dolls ===
- Goo Goo Dolls (1987)
- Jed (1989)
- Hold Me Up (1990)
- Superstar Car Wash (1993)
- A Boy Named Goo (1995)
- Dizzy Up The Girl (1998)
- Gutterflower (2002)
- Let Love In (2006)
- Something for the Rest of Us (2010)
- Magnetic (2013)
- Boxes (2016)
- Miracle Pill (2019)
- It's Christmas All Over (2020)
- Chaos in Bloom (2022)
