= John Rzeznik =

American singer-songwriter and record producer (born 1965)

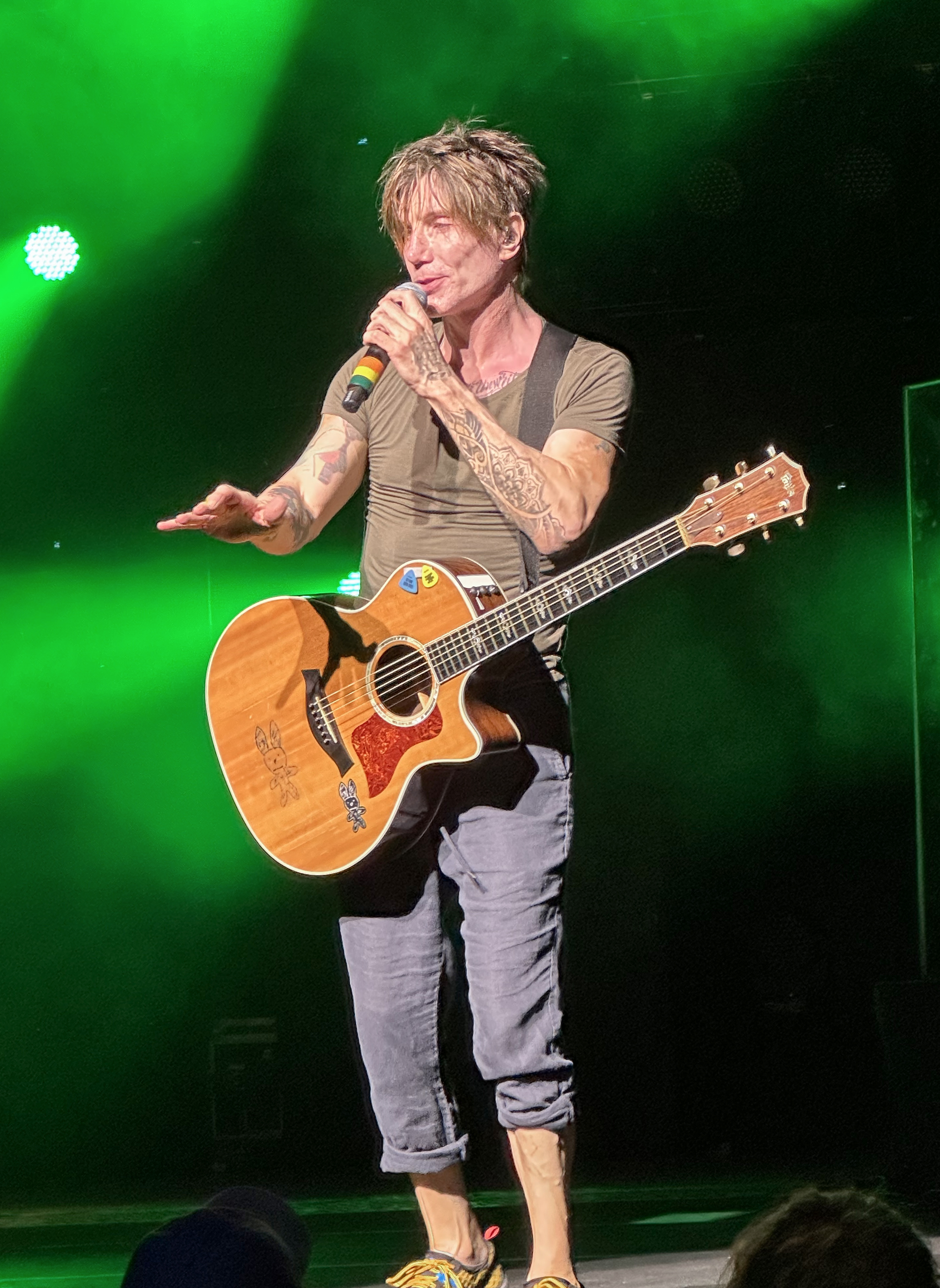
- Rzeznik performing in 2023

Background information
- Born: John Joseph Theodore Rzeznik; December 5, 1965 (age 60); Buffalo, New York, U.S.
- Genres: Rock; alternative rock; pop rock; punk rock
- Occupations: Singer-songwriter; guitarist; record producer
- Instruments: Vocals; guitar
- Years active: 1981–present
- Labels: Metal Blade; Warner; Warner Bros.
- Member of: The Goo Goo Dolls
- Spouse(s): Laurie Farinacci (m. 1993; div. 2003) Melina Gallo (m. 2013)
- Children: 1
- Website: googoodolls.com

John Joseph Theodore Rzeznik (/ˈrɛznɪk/; born December 5, 1965) is an American musician, singer, songwriter, and producer. He is best known as the founder, guitarist and frontman of the rock band Goo Goo Dolls, with whom he has recorded several chart-topping hits, including "Iris", "Slide", and "Name".

Born and raised in Buffalo, New York, Rzeznik grew up in a working-class Polish-American family, heavily influenced by music from a young age. Rzeznik formed the Goo Goo Dolls in 1985 with bassist Robby Takac, and the band achieved success in the 1990s with a series of albums that blended alternative rock, punk, and power-pop influences. The band's breakthrough was the 1998 album Dizzy Up the Girl, whose biggest hit, "Iris", topped the charts after its inclusion on the soundtrack for the 1998 film City of Angels.

Rzeznik's other projects include songwriting for film soundtracks and producing music for other artists. He was inducted into the Songwriters Hall of Fame in 2008 and received accolades throughout his career. Rzeznik has been open about his personal struggles, including his battle with alcoholism. He has also participated in charity events and fundraisers.

== Early life ==
Rzeznik was born in Buffalo, New York, the youngest of five children and only son of Edith (née Pomeroy) and Joe Rzeznik, a bar proprietor and postal clerk. Both of Rzeznik's parents were musicians, playing the clarinet and flute. Rzeznik had a strict Catholic upbringing in Buffalo's working-class East Side Polish neighborhood and attended Corpus Christi Grammar School. Rzeznik's paternal grandparents were born in Poland.

Rzeznik's father died at the age of 53 on February 2, 1981 from a diabetic coma when Rzeznik was age 15. On October 26, 1982, his mother died at the age of 51 from a sudden heart attack in the family's living room when Rzeznik was 16. Having lost both of his parents, he was brought up by his four older sisters, Phyllis, Fran, Gladys and Kate, with help from their cousin, John Guljas. He paid for his own apartment using Social Security Survivor Benefit checks. It was during this period and while attending McKinley Vocational High School that Rzeznik began playing the guitar. He briefly attended Buffalo State College, dropping out after his first year.

== Career ==
=== Goo Goo Dolls ===
In 1985, Rzeznik formed the band that became the Goo Goo Dolls with Robby Takac. Rzeznik had previously been in a band with Takac's cousin, called The Beaumonts.

In the early days of the Goo Goo Dolls, the band performed at gigs relentlessly, with Takac as the frontman. Rzeznik gradually became the band's frontman over the next few albums, as each new album contained more songs sung by Rzeznik than the last. They were soon picked up by a small record label, Celluloid. Under Celluloid, they released their first eponymous album on a $750 budget; later, the re-prints would be referred to as "First Release". This attracted the attention of a larger record label, Metal Blade, who released their next few albums.

Rzeznik in 2026, performing with the Goo Goo Dolls at the Sea.Hear.Now Festival in Asbury Park, NJ

For the next few years, the band toured and worked on new material. The band received early success with the single "Name" as well as being featured in Freddy's Dead: The Final Nightmare with the song "I'm Awake Now". Fast forward to their album Dizzy Up the Girl, the single "Iris" became a critical success due in large part to the release of the film City of Angels and it being a featured music video for the film.

=== Other activity ===
Following the album Gutterflower, Rzeznik wrote "Always Know Where You Are" and "I'm Still Here" for the Disney film Treasure Planet, which were also released as a single independently from the band.

Rzeznik, along with Ryan Cabrera, produced the latter's 2004 album Take It All Away; Rzeznik was the main producer.

From October to December 2007, Rzeznik was a judge with Sheila E. and Australian Idol judge and marketing manager Ian "Dicko" Dickson on the Fox network's The Next Great American Band.

On June 19, 2008, Rzeznik was inducted into the Songwriters Hall of Fame and was awarded the Hal David Starlight Award.

On March 24, 2014, Cash Cash released their single "Lightning". The single featured Rzeznik on vocals and was written by Cash Cash and Rzeznik together.

On November 29, 2020, he participated in a virtual fundraiser to help combat hunger and raise money for the Community Foodbank of New Jersey.

== Musical style ==
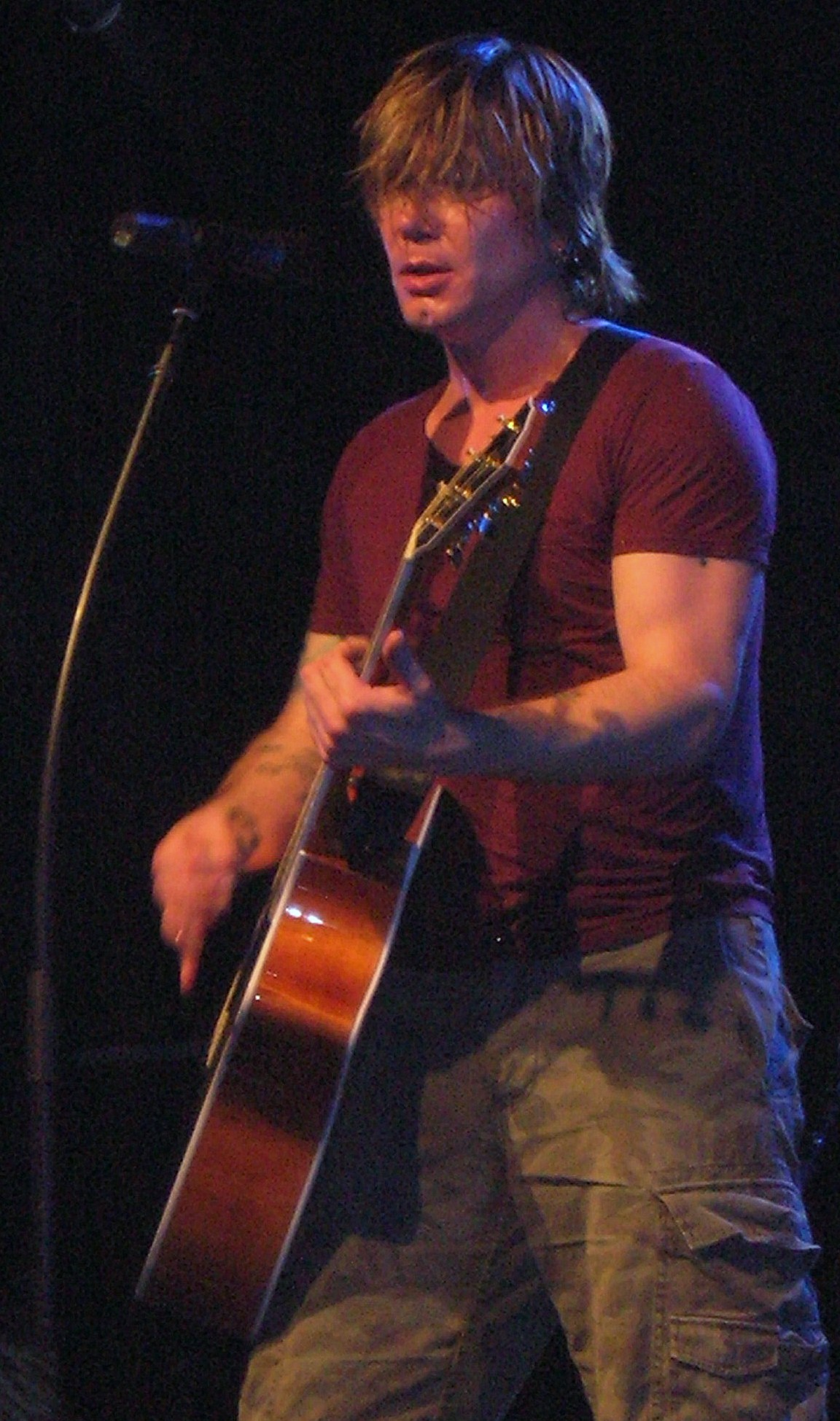
Rzeznik in 2006

=== Influences ===
Most of the music Rzeznik listened to while growing up was influenced by his sisters, and consisted of classic rock such as The Rolling Stones and The Kinks. The youngest of his four older sisters moved towards punk music and Rzeznik became interested in bands such as Ramones and The Clash. Rzeznik attributes his gift for melody to listening to bands such as Kiss, Cheap Trick, The Cure and Rush in the early 1980s. Rzeznik also cites Paul Westerberg as an "obvious influence" on his music. Westerberg co-wrote the 1993 Goo Goo Dolls song "We Are the Normal" with Rzeznik, who reflected on the experience by stating "To some people, Keith Richards is their hero. I feel that way about Westerberg. Keith Richards got to do his thing with Chuck Berry, and I got to do it with Westerberg. That was amazing to me."

Rzeznik has stated that his dream collaboration would be with singer/songwriter Grace VanderWaal.

=== Songwriting ===
Rzeznik believes writing is not just an inspirational act but that writing music is "ninety nine percent perspiration." He says that when writing a song, he often "runs tape and screws around with stuff," and his songs are often both biographical and autobiographical. According to Rzeznik, before penning down the song "Iris", he was on the verge of leaving the band because he had been writing songs for the past nine years and it had been a low. However, Rzeznik was approached for writing the soundtrack of the movie City of Angels, and after watching the movie, Rzeznik penned down the song, which changed the band's career.

=== Guitar tunings ===
Rzeznik is known for his use of alternate guitar tunings in his songs. Rzeznik has said that he would "basically sit there at night and just start tuning my guitar strings up and down until something sounded really cool." For example, "Iris" is played with the guitar tuned to BDDDDD.

== Equipment ==
After the Goo Goo Dolls' equipment was stolen from a van in New York City (including Rzeznik's Marshall JCM800 amplifier and his only guitar at the time), following the recording of their 1989 album, Jed, a custom, yellow Stratocaster-style guitar (later nicknamed "Boing") was made for Rzeznik by ESP. Now without an amplifier, Rzeznik borrowed a near-identical Marshall JCM800 from a mutual friend of the band, Charles Root. This amplifier was then used to record Hold Me Up and Superstar Car Wash. Since the late 1990s, Rzeznik has used Fender electric guitars. He has used many variations such as the Stratocaster, Telecaster, Jaguar and a "Halfcaster" (a Stratocaster cut in half). He also used Guild acoustic guitars on the Dizzy Up the Girl and Gutterflower tours. Rzeznik noted in a 2003 interview that "No matter what guitar I have, it seems that anything with strings makes music to my ears."

== Personal life ==
Rzeznik met former model Laurie Farinacci in 1990, and married her in 1993. The marriage produced no children, and ended in divorce in 2003. Rzeznik started dating Melina Gallo in 2005, and married her in Malibu, California, on July 26, 2013. On December 22, 2016, he and Gallo had their first child, a daughter.

Rzeznik resides in Westfield, New Jersey. He is a recovering alcoholic.

== Discography ==
- Goo Goo Dolls (1986), Celluloid Records later re-released as First Release (1987), Metal Blade Records
- Jed (1989), Metal Blade Records
- Hold Me Up (1990), Metal Blade Records
- Superstar Car Wash (1993), Warner Bros. Records
- A Boy Named Goo (1995), Warner Bros. Records
- Dizzy Up The Girl (1998), Warner Bros. Records
- Gutterflower (2002), Warner Bros. Records
- Let Love In (2006), Warner Bros. Records
- Something for the Rest of Us (2010), Warner Bros. Records
- Magnetic (2013), Warner Bros. Records
- Boxes (2016), Warner Bros. Records
- Miracle Pill (2019)
- It's Christmas All Over (2020)
- Chaos In Bloom (2022)

=== Solo singles ===
| Title | Year | Chart positions | | | Album |
| Title | Year | US Pop | US Adult | AUS | Album |
|---|---|---|---|---|---|
| "I'm Still Here (Jim's Theme)" | 2002 | 38 | 10 | 68 | Treasure Planet Soundtrack |

=== Collaborations/individual discography ===
- "Wish You Were Here" – with Limp Bizkit - America: A Tribute to Heroes (2001)
- "Always Know Where You Are" – Treasure Planet (2002)
- "Once in a Lifetime" – Good Morning, Miami theme (2002)
- "For Your Love" – with The Yardbirds – Birdland (2003)
- "All I Want Is You" – Les Paul & Friends – American Made World Played (2005)
- "Just Say Yes" – with Vanessa Amorosi – V (2011) unreleased album
- "Lightning" – with Cash Cash - Blood, Sweat & 3 Years (2016)
