= O.A.R. discography =

O.A.R discography
- Studio albums: 11
- EPs: 1
- Live albums: 5
- Compilation albums: 1
- Singles: 19

This is the discography for American rock band O.A.R.

== Studio albums ==
Title	Details	Peak chart positions			
Title	Details	US	US Alt	US Indie	US Rock
The Wanderer	Release date: November 29, 1997; Label: self-released; Formats: CD, cassette	—	—	—	—
Soul's Aflame	Release date: May 18, 1999; Label: Oarfin; Formats: CD, cassette	—	—	—	—
Risen	Release date: February 6, 2001; Label: Everfine; Formats: CD, cassette	—	—	44	—
In Between Now and Then	Release date: May 27, 2003; Label: Lava; Formats: CD, cassette	54	—	—	—
Stories of a Stranger	Release date: October 4, 2005; Label: Lava; Formats: CD, music download	40	—	—	—
All Sides	Release date: July 15, 2008; Label: Lava/Atlantic; Formats: CD, music download	13	3	—	4
King	Release date: August 2, 2011; Label: Wind-up; Formats: CD, music download	12	—	—	2
The Rockville LP	Release date: June 10, 2014; Label: Vanguard; Formats: CD, music download	13	—	—	6
The Mighty	Release date: March 29, 2019; Label: Black Rock Entertainment; Formats: CD, music download	142	—	—	25
The Arcade	Release date: July 15, 2022; Label: Black Rock Entertainment; Formats: CD, music download	—	—	—	—
Three Tinted Windows	Release date: October 23, 2026; Label: Black Rock Entertainment; Formats: CD, vinyl, music download	—	—	—	—
"—" denotes releases that did not chart

== Live albums ==
Title	Details	Peak chart positions			
Title	Details	US	US Alt	US Indie	US Rock
Any Time Now	Release date: May 6, 2002; Label: Everfine Records; Formats: CD, cassette	156	—	11	—
34th & 8th	Release date: July 27, 2004; Label: Everfine Records; Formats: CD, music download	80	—	6	—
Live from Madison Square Garden	Release date: June 5, 2007; Label: Atlantic Records; Formats: DVD, CD, music download	69	—	—	23
Rain or Shine	Release date: January 12, 2010; Label: Everfine/Atlantic Records; Formats: CD, music download	49	7	5	10
Live on Red Rocks	Release date: November 19, 2012; Label: Wind Up Records; Formats: DVD, CD, music download	—	—	—	—
Live from Merriweather	Release date: November 22, 2019; Label: Black Rock; Formats: Vinyl, streaming	—	—	—	—
Live in Boston	Release date: December 6, 2024; Label: Black Rock; Formats: Vinyl, streaming	—	—	—	—
"—" denotes releases that did not chart

== Live extended plays ==
Title	Details	Peak positions
Title	Details	US
Hello, Tomorrow	Release date: 2009; Label: Atlantic Records; Formats: CD, music download	180

== Compilation albums ==
Title	Details	Peak positions
Title	Details	US
XX	Release date: August 5, 2016; Label: Vanguard Records; Formats: CD, download	31

== Singles ==
Year	Single	Peak chart positions						Certifications (sales threshold)	Album
Year	Single	US	US AC	US Adult	US Alt	US Pop	CAN	Certifications (sales threshold)	Album
2003	"Hey Girl"	—	—	26	—	—	—		In Between Now and Then
2004	"Right on Time"	—	—	—	—	—	—		In Between Now and Then
2005	"Love and Memories"	— (Note: "Love and Memories" did not enter the Billboard Hot 100, but peaked at number sixteen on the Bubbling Under Hot 100 Singles chart.)	—	17	30	—	—	US: Gold	Stories of a Stranger
2006	"Heard the World"	—	—	24	—	—	—		Stories of a Stranger
2006	"Lay Down"	—	—	—	—	—	—		Stories of a Stranger
2008	"This Town" (re-released to radio in 2009)	— (Note: "This Town" did not enter the Billboard Hot 100, but peaked at number nineteen on the Bubbling Under Hot 100 Singles chart.)	—	17	—	—	—		All Sides
2008	"Shattered (Turn the Car Around)"	36	14	2	—	25	43	US: Platinum	All Sides
2011	"Heaven"	—	—	22	—	—	—		King
2011	"Gotta Be Wrong Sometimes"	—	—	—	—	—	—		King
2014	"Peace"	— (Note: "Peace" did not enter the Billboard Hot 100, but peaked at number seventeen on the Bubbling Under Hot 100 Singles chart.)	24	14	—	—	—		The Rockville LP
2014	"Favorite Song"	—	—	38	—	—	—		The Rockville LP
2015	"Two Hands Up"	—	—	—	—	—	—		The Rockville LP
2016	"I Go Through"	—	—	32	—	—	—		XX
2018	"Just Like Paradise"	—	—	—	—	—	—		Non-album single
2018	"Miss You All the Time"	—	—	25	—	—	—		The Mighty
2019	"Knocking at Your Door"	—	—	37	—	—	—		The Mighty
2021	"Alive"	—	—	—	—	—	—		The Arcade
2022	"In the Clouds"	—	—	29	—	—	—		The Arcade
2023	"I Won't Back Down" (with Goo Goo Dolls)	—	—	—	—	—	—		Non-album single
2026	"Crew"	—	—	—	—	—	—		Three Tinted Windows
2026	"Legacy" (featuring G.Love)	—	—	—	—	—	—		Three Tinted Windows
2026	"Three Tinted Windows"	—	—	—	—	—	—		Three Tinted Windows
"—" denotes releases that did not chart

== Song appearances ==
- O.A.R. performed the theme song for the ABC show Extreme Makeover: Home Edition. During a two-hour special that aired on December 11, 2005, they provided a street-side concert, including a live performance of "So Much", the Extreme Makeover Home Edition theme, in front of the newly redesigned Los Angeles Free Clinic.
- In 2006, O.A.R. Performed at the MLB's Home Run Derby at PNC Park in Pittsburgh, Singing "Love and Memories" and other titles.
- In 2006, the band's song "Love and Memories" was featured in the movie She's the Man.
- In June 2007 the band's songs "Wonderful Day" and "One Shot" were used extensively by ESPN during its coverage of the 2007 NCAA Division I baseball tournament and College World Series; "This Town" was similarly used in 2008
- In 2008, their song "Love is Worth The Fall" was featured on the deluxe edition soundtrack for the film Twilight. The song was also released as an iTunes single.
- On Oct. 16 2011, the songs "Heaven" and "Wonderful Day" were played during "iGenius," a documentary about the life and death of Steve Jobs which was hosted by Adam Savage and Jamie Hyneman of MythBusters.
- On March 28, 2015, the WWE used the song "Peace" as part of a tribute to fan Connor "The Crusher".
- ESPN has used "That Was a Crazy Game of Poker" as an introduction to its coverage of the World Series of Poker.

== Album appearances ==
Compilation name (year, song title)

- Bonnaroo 2003 (2003, "Risen")
- National Heads-Up Poker Championship 2005 (1997, "That Was a Crazy Game of Poker")
- Rock For Relief (2006, "James")
- Mixclusives: Volume 6 (2006, "Love & Memories")
- The Target Red Room Volume: 5 (2006, "One Shot (live)")
- Kyle XY Soundtrack (2007, "Wonderful Day")
- Instant Karma: The Amnesty International Campaign to Save Darfur (2007, "Borrowed Time")
- For the Kids Three (2007, "Itsy Bitsy Spider")
- Serve2: Fighting Hunger & Poverty (2007, "Dareh Meyod" [*version from Live from Madison Square Garden])
- Serve4: Artists Against Hunger & Poverty (2009, "Lay Down" [*version from Rain or Shine)
- Twilight (soundtrack) (Special/Deluxe Edition) (2009, "Love Is Worth The Fall")
- Music For Action: Best of Bonnaroo (2010, "Delicate Few" [*version from Bonnaroo 2005])
