= XX (O.A.R. album) =

xx

Compilation album by O.A.R.
- Released: August 5, 2016
- Genres: Rock, pop rock
- Length: 2:24:32
- Label: Vanguard

O.A.R. chronology
| The Rockville LP (2014) | xx (2016) |

XX is a two-disc compilation album by American alternative rock group O.A.R. (Of A Revolution). It was released August 5, 2016 by Vanguard Records. The album was released to celebrate the band's twenty-year career; it features songs from the band's past catalogue, two new songs and a second disc of live songs.

== Reception ==
The album debuted at No. 31 on the Billboard 200 chart based on 13,000 units, 12,000 of which are pure album sales. It also debuted at No. 5 on Top Rock Albums.

== Track listing ==
=== Disc 1 ===
| No. | Title | Length |
|---|---|---|
| 1. | "Follow Me, Follow You" | 3:36 |
| 2. | "I Go Through" | 4:00 |
| 3. | "Peace" (from The Rockville LP) | 3:35 |
| 4. | "Two Hands Up" (from The Rockville LP) | 3:10 |
| 5. | "Heaven" (from King) | 3:31 |
| 6. | "This Town" (XX Version)" | 3:36 |
| 7. | "Love and Memories (XX Version)" | 4:14 |
| 8. | "Shattered (Turn the Car Around) (XX Version)" | 4:10 |
| 9. | "Heard the World" (Stories of a Stranger) | 5:02 |
| 10. | "Lay Down" (from Stories of a Stranger) | 4:08 |
| 11. | "Hey Girl" (from In Between Now and Then) | 4:11 |
| 12. | "That Was a Crazy Game of Poker" (from The Wanderer) | 8:43 |
| 13. | "Heaven (XX Adubato Remix)" | 3:33 |

=== Disc 2 ===
| No. | Title | Length |
|---|---|---|
| 1. | "City on Down (Live)" (from Any Time Now) | 8:10 |
| 2. | "Dareh Meyod (Live)" (from 34th & 8th) | 5:39 |
| 3. | "Black Rock (Live)" (from Live on Red Rocks) | 7:43 |
| 4. | "About An Hour Ago (Live)" (from Live at Madison Square Garden) | 6:35 |
| 5. | "Night Shift...Stir It Up (Live) (feat. Junior Marvin)" (from Any Time Now) | 11:10 |
| 6. | "Untitled (Live)" (from Live at Madison Square Garden) | 5:47 |
| 7. | "About Mr. Brown (Live)" (from Live at Madison Square Garden) | 5:38 |
| 8. | "I Feel Home (Live)" (from 34th & 8th) | 6:30 |
| 9. | "Delicate Few (Live)" (from Live on Red Rocks) | 8:13 |
| 10. | "War Song (Live)" (from Live on Red Rocks) | 11:22 |
| 11. | "That Was a Crazy Game of Poker (Live)" | 12:13 |

== Charts ==
| Chart (2016) | Peak position |
|---|---|
| US Billboard 200 | 31 |
| US Digital Albums (Billboard) | 7 |
| US Top Rock Albums (Billboard) | 5 |
