= Acoustic music =

Non-electric music created through acoustics

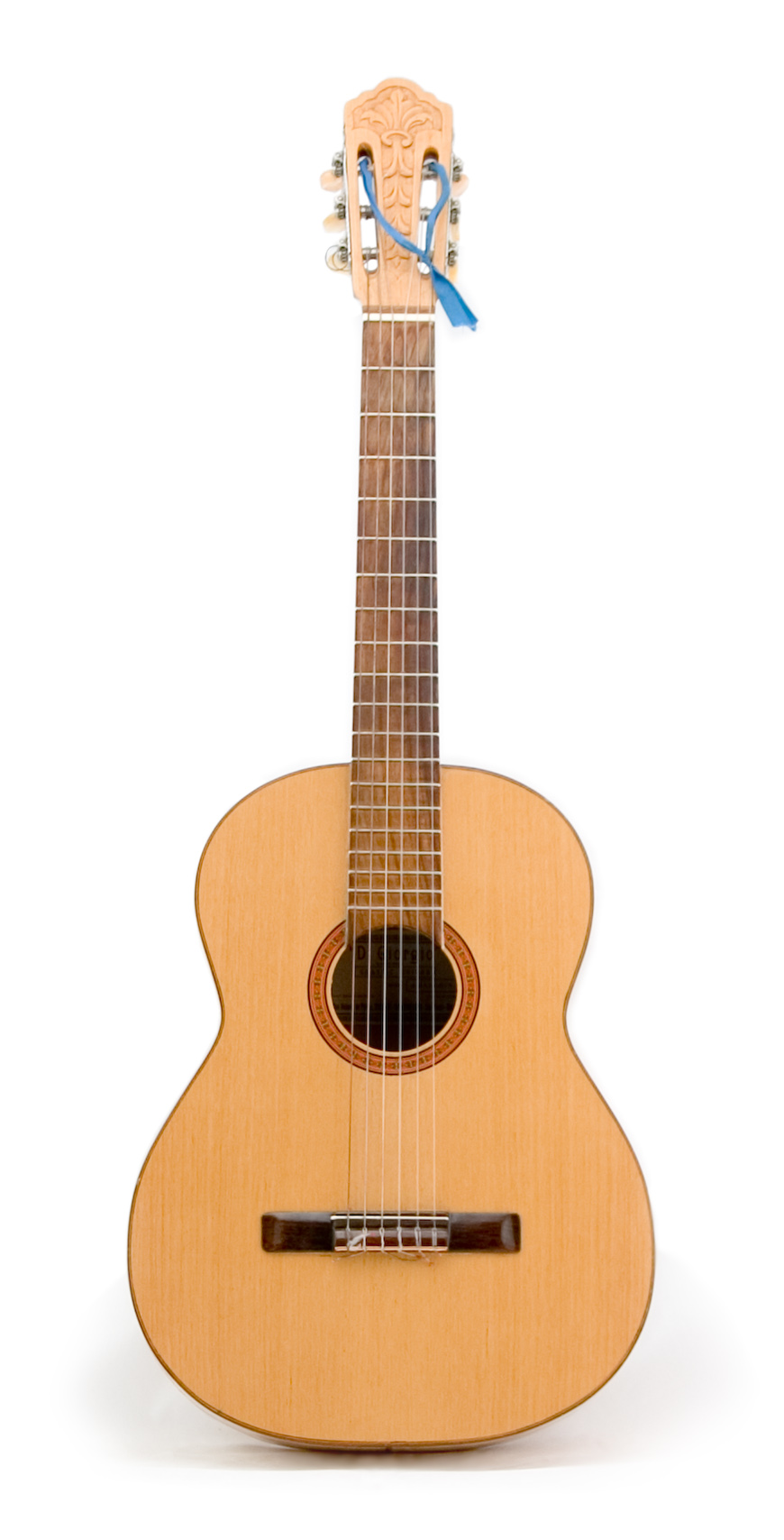
- A Spanish guitar
- Stylistic origins: Folk
- Cultural origins: Ancient
- Typical instruments: Acoustic guitar

Other topics
- Folk rock; soft rock

Acoustic music is music that solely or primarily uses instruments that produce sound through acoustic means, as opposed to electric or electronic means. While all music was once acoustic, the retronym "acoustic music" appeared after the advent of electric instruments, such as the electric guitar, electric violin, electric organ and synthesizer. Acoustic string instrumentations had long been a subset of popular music, particularly in folk. It stood in contrast to various other types of music in various eras, including big band music in the pre-rock era, and electric music in the rock era.

Music reviewer Craig Conley suggests, "When music is labeled acoustic, unplugged, or unwired, the assumption seems to be that other types of music are cluttered by technology and overproduction and therefore aren't as pure."

== Types of acoustic instruments ==
Acoustic instruments can be split into six groups: string instruments, wind instruments, percussion, other instruments, ensemble instruments, and unclassified instruments.

String instruments have a tightly stretched string that, when set in motion, creates energy at (almost) harmonically related frequencies.

Wind instruments are in the shape of a pipe and energy is supplied as an air stream into the pipe.

Percussion instruments make sound when they are struck, as with a hand or a stick.

== History ==
The original acoustic instrument was the human voice, which produces sound by funneling air across the vocal cords. The first constructed acoustic instrument is believed to be the flute. The oldest surviving flute is as much as 43,000 years old, believed to have originated in Central Europe.

By 1800, the most popular acoustic plucked-string instruments closely resembled the modern-day guitar, but with a smaller body. As the century continued, Spanish luthier Antonio de Torres Jurado took these smaller instruments and expanded the bodies to create guitars. Guitar use and popularity grew in Europe throughout the late 18th century and more acoustic instruments were crafted, such as the double bass. Its popularity later spread to cities and towns in the new United States. In the 19th century, the guitar became a recognized instrument played in grand galas and concerts.

As electric instruments took hold during the 20th century, many stringed instruments were redefined as acoustic. Instruments that involve striking or vibrating the strings, such as the violin, viola and cello, fall under the acoustic category. The violin became popular during the 16th and 17th centuries, due to technological advancements in building them, brought on by luthiers such as Antonio Stradivari and Andrea Amati. The modern version of the instrument developed gradually from older European acoustic stringed instruments such as the lira.

Following the birth of rock in the 1960s, some rock bands began to experiment with acoustic songs. This would be known as acoustic rock, and many well-known artists such as Eric Clapton and Nirvana performed acoustic versions of their well-known songs in the early 1990s, which were collected on the MTV Unplugged series.

Pop music artists have also experimented with acoustic music as well, with this variant sometimes being called acoustic pop. Like acoustic rock, some acoustic pop songs have also made their way to MTV Unplugged as well. Some notable acoustic pop songs include "True" by Ryan Cabrera and "Exile" by Taylor Swift featuring Bon Iver.

By the 2000s, popular indie musicians began to identify their genre as "contemporary acoustic", in opposition to being classified as "folk music". Daniel Trilling wrote, "Folk is a word that strikes fear into the hearts of many aspiring pop musicians. Not only does it conjure up images of the terminally naff — woolly jumpers, beards, and so on — but it is also the journalist's catch-all term for legions of singer-songwriters too bland to merit a better definition."

Some music interest groups in the United States use the term "acoustic music" alongside the genres of folk and Americana music, like the Ogden Friends of Acoustic Music.

The International Acoustic Music Awards hosts an annual competition for original songs. Their rules state that a song can be considered acoustic as long as an acoustic instrument, including voices, can be clearly heard.

Acoustic music is often easier for business owners to host because there is less need for amplification and the level of volume is less intrusive. In June 2021, the city of Cambridge, Massachusetts, allowed small businesses to host acoustic concerts without applying for a live entertainment permit. Cambridge defined an acoustic performance as having no amplification of sound except for one microphone, and having no more than five acoustic performers or musicians at a single venue at one time.

== Bibliography ==
- Randel, Don Michael (2003). The Harvard Dictionary of Music. Harvard University Press. ISBN 978-0-674-01163-2.
- Safire, William (2007). "On Language: Retronym". New York Times Magazine (January 7): 18.
