= Rain or Shine (O.A.R. album) =

Live album by O.A.R.
- Released: January 12, 2010
- Recorded: June 18 and 19, 2009
- Genre: Rock
- Length: 4:01:44
- Label: Everfine/Atlantic
- Producer: O.A.R.

O.A.R. chronology
All Sides (2008)	Rain or Shine (2010)	King (2011)

O.A.R. Live Album chronology
Live from Madison Square Garden (2007)	Rain or Shine (2010)	Live on Red Rocks (2012)

Professional ratings
Review scores
Source	Rating
Allmusic	3.5/5 stars
Alternative Addiction	4/5 stars

Rain or Shine is a live album by O.A.R. which was recorded on June 18 and June 19, 2009 at Charter One Pavilion in Chicago, Illinois. The live album includes all 37 tracks that were played during those two nights on a four–disc set with over four hours of music. Released on January 12, 2010, Rain or Shine is O.A.R.'s tenth released album; it is the fourth live album that the released.

Openers scheduled for the two shows were Robert Randolph and the Family Band (night one) and The Wailers (night two). Due to the inclement weather conditions on night two, the Wailers did not end up performing. Robert Randolph was a guest performer on the Led Zeppelin cover "Fool in the Rain".

On the second night, O.A.R. almost cancelled the show because of the rain and lightning. After a two-hour delay, Marc Roberge (lead vocals, guitar) said that they were literally minutes from calling the whole thing off but then they heard the fans chanting in the parking lot and they decided to have the show. The lightning let up, but the rain continued intermittently throughout the night. O.A.R. was able to perform a full set, despite having to make changes to their stage set-up because of the effect of the weather.

== Track listing ==
=== Night one ===
==== Disc one ====
No.	Title	Length
1.	"About Mr. Brown"	6:40
2.	"Living in the End"	4:13
3.	"Right on Time"	6:08
4.	"So Moved On"	7:49
5.	"Risen"	4:06
6.	"Dinner Last Night"	4:41
7.	"Tonight"	4:52
8.	"Conquering Fools"	5:21
9.	"About an Hour Ago"	7:33

==== Disc two ====
No.	Title	Length
1.	"I Feel Home" (acoustic)	6:46
2.	"The Wanderer" (acoustic)	4:58
3.	"Shattered (Turn the Car Around)" (acoustic)	4:54
4.	"That Was a Crazy Game of Poker" (acoustic)	9:08
5.	"On My Way"	5:58
6.	"Black Rock"	5:58
7.	"Lay Down"	7:23
8.	"War Song"	7:44
9.	"This Town"	6:28
10.	"Fool in the Rain" (encore performance)	7:21
11.	"Love and Memories" (encore performance)	5:23

=== Night two ===
==== Disc three ====
No.	Title	Length
1.	"Revisited"	6:33
2.	"Night Shift"	3:54
3.	"Someone in the Road"	3:33
4.	"Whose Chariot?"	9:09
5.	"King of the Thing"	4:25
6.	"On Top the Cage"	7:00
7.	"Here's to You"	7:35
8.	"Untitled"	7:54
9.	"Hey Girl"	8:25

==== Disc four ====
No.	Title	Length
1.	"What is Mine"	5:50
2.	"Delicate Few"	8:25
3.	"City on Down"	5:49
4.	"Whatever Happened"	5:35
5.	"Get Away"	8:40
6.	"Rhythm of Your Shoes" (encore performance)	5:44
7.	"Shattered (Turn the Car Around)" (encore performance)	5:04
8.	"That Was a Crazy Game of Poker" (encore performance)	15:02

== Personnel ==
O. A. R.

- Chris Culos - drums, percussion
- Jerry DePizzo - saxophone, electric guitar, percussion, background vocals
- Benj Gershman - bass guitar
- Richard On - lead guitar, background vocals
- Marc Roberge - lead vocals, acoustic and electric rhythm guitars

Additional Musicians

- Mikel Paris - keyboards, percussion, vocals
- Robert Randolph of the Family Band - steel pedal guitar on "Fool In The Rain"
