= You Stand Watching =

Studio album by Ryan Cabrera
- Released: September 20, 2005
- Recorded: 2005
- Genre: Pop rock
- Length: 36:28
- Label: Atlantic
- Producer: Ryan Cabrera

Ryan Cabrera chronology
Take It All Away (2004)	You Stand Watching (2005)	The Moon Under Water (2008)

Singles from You Stand Watching
- 1. "Shine On" Released: August 8, 2005; 2. "Photo" Released: November 28, 2005

Professional ratings
Review scores
Source	Rating
Allmusic	2.5/5 stars
E! Online	B
Entertainment Weekly	C−
The New York Times	(mixed)
USA Today	2/4 stars

You Stand Watching is the third studio album by American pop rock musician Ryan Cabrera, released on September 20, 2005, through Atlantic Records. He produced the record and worked with songwriters such as Kara DioGuardi.

"Shine On" was the lead single from the album. It peaked at number 86 on the Billboard Hot 100 and 25 on the Mainstream Top 40. "Photo" was released as the second and final single from the album in November 2005.

The album peaked at number 24 on the Billboard 200.

== Singles ==
"Shine On" was released on August 8, 2005, as the lead single. It debuted on the Billboard Hot 100 the week of October 8, 2005, at number 99 and rose to a peak of number 86. It peaked at number 25 on the Mainstream Top 40 Airplay.

"Photo" was the second single, being released on November 28, 2005, to contemporary hit radio. It received airplay on a few radio stations.

== Commercial performance ==
You Stand Watching debuted and peaked on the US Billboard 200 at number 24. It spent seven weeks on the chart.

== Track listing ==
No.	Title	Writer(s)	Length
1.	"From the Start"	Ryan Cabrera, J Mack Slaughter	3:05
2.	"Hit Me With Your Light"	Cabrera, Andrew Ripp	3:04
3.	"Shine On"	Cabrera, Guy Erez, Ripp, Randy Coleman	3:06
4.	"Find Your Way"	Cabrera, Ripp	3:24
5.	"Photo"	Cabrera, Kara DioGuardi	3:37
6.	"Our Story"	Cabrera, Ripp, Coleman	3:32
7.	"Fall Baby Fall"	Cabrera, Shawn Mullins, Chris James	3:20
8.	"Last Night"	Cabrera, Paul Durham	3:20
9.	"Walking On Water"	Cabrera, Ripp, Coleman, Guy Erez	3:39
10.	"With You Gone"	Cabrera, Curt Frasca, Sabelle Breer	4:02
11.	"It's You"	Cabrera, Slaughter, Aslyn	3:45

You Stand Watching (bonus disc in Wal-Mart Stores)

1. "I Know What It Feels Like"
2. "All Night Train"
3. "Take It All Away" (Acoustic Version)
4. "Exit to Exit" (Acoustic Version)
5. "Shame On Me" (Acoustic Version)

Japan & iTunes Bonus Track

1. "Sentimental"

== Personnel ==
Musicians

- Ryan Cabrera – acoustic guitars and vocals
- Greg Suran – electric guitars
- Jamie Muhoberac – piano, organs, strings, keyboards
- Dorian Crozier – drums and loops
- Paul Bushnell – bass guitar
- Dave Takahashi (credited as Dakahashi) – cello

Production

- Ryan Cabrera – producer
- Doug McKean – engineer, vocal engineer (tracks 3, 5, 11)
- Chris Lord-Alge – mixing
- Dimtar Krnjaic – mixing assistant
- Alan Yashida – mastering
- Ethan "Dam" Kaufmann – vocal engineer (tracks 1, 2, 4, 6–10)
- Guy Erez – acoustic guitar engineer

== Chart performance ==
Year	Album/single	Chart	Peak position
2005	You Stand Watching [Album]	The Billboard 200	24
2005	Shine on [Single]	Billboard Hot 100; Top 40 Mainstream; Pop 100	86; 25; 38
