= On the Way Down =

2004 single by Ryan Cabrera

Single by Ryan Cabrera

from the album Take It All Away
- Released: May 24, 2004
- Studio: Ocean Way B; John Rzeznik's house (Los Angeles, California, US)
- Length: 3:32
- Label: Atlantic
- Songwriters: Curtis Frasca; Sabelle Breer; Ryan Cabrera
- Producers: John Rzeznik; Ryan Cabrera

Ryan Cabrera singles chronology
"On the Way Down" (2004)	"True" (2004)

Music video
- "On the Way Down" on YouTube

"On the Way Down" is the debut single of American musician Ryan Cabrera, released from his 2004 studio album, Take It All Away. Cabrera co-wrote the song with Curtis Frasca and Sabelle Breer and produced it with Goo Goo Dolls frontman John Rzeznik. Released on May 24, 2004, the song peaked at number 15 on the US Billboard Hot 100 on October 5, 2004. The song won a 2006 ASCAP Pop Award for most performed song of the year.

== Music video ==
The music video features Ashlee Simpson, Cabrera's then-girlfriend, playing his love interest. The music video for the single was filmed in Austin, Texas, at the University of Texas at Austin. The video reached number four on the TRL countdown.

== Track listings ==
US CD single

1. "On the Way Down" – 3:32
2. "Let's Take Our Time" – 3:09
3. "On the Way Down" (video)

Australian CD single

1. "On the Way Down" (album version) – 3:32
2. "I Know What It Feels Like" – 3:28
3. "Exit to Exit" (NapsterLive version) – 4:24

== Credits and personnel ==
Credits are lifted from the US enhanced CD single liner notes and inlay.

Studios

- Recorded at Ocean Way Recording Studio B and John Rzeznik's house (Los Angeles, California, US)
- Mixed at Ocean Way Recording Studio D (Los Angeles, California, US)

Personnel

- Ryan Cabrera – writing, vocals, acoustic guitar, production
- Curtis Frasca – writing
- Sabelle Breer – writing
- Greg Suran – electric guitars
- Paul Bushnell – bass
- Gregg Bissonette – drums, percussion
- John Rzeznik – production
- Doug McKean – engineering, mixing
- Evan Lamberg – executive album production

== Charts ==
=== Weekly charts ===
Chart (2004)	Peak position
Australia (ARIA)	48
Canada CHR/Pop Top 30 (Radio & Records)	10
Canada Hot AC Top 30 (Radio & Records)	5
New Zealand (Recorded Music NZ)	26
US Billboard Hot 100	15
US Adult Contemporary (Billboard)	35
US Adult Pop Airplay (Billboard)	6
US Pop Airplay (Billboard)	4

=== Year-end charts ===
Chart (2004)	Position
US Billboard Hot 100	73
US Adult Top 40 (Billboard)	37
US Mainstream Top 40 (Billboard)	28

Chart (2005)	Position
US Mainstream Top 40 (Billboard)	100

== Certifications ==
Region	Certification	Certified units/sales
United States (RIAA)	Gold	500,000^{*}
^{*} Sales figures based on certification alone.

== Release history ==
Region	Date	Format(s)	Label(s)	Ref.
United States	May 24, 2004	Contemporary hit; hot adult contemporary radio	Atlantic	
Australia	November 22, 2004	CD	Atlantic	
