= Shine On (Ryan Cabrera song) =

Single by Ryan Cabrera

from the album You Stand Watching
- Released: August 8, 2005
- Recorded: 2005
- Genre: Pop
- Length: 3:05
- Label: Atlantic
- Songwriters: Ryan Cabrera, Randy Coleman, Andrew Ripp, Guy Erez

Ryan Cabrera singles chronology
"40 Kinds of Sadness" (2005)	"Shine On" (2005)	"Photo" (2005)

"Shine On" is a song recorded by American pop rock artist Ryan Cabrera. He wrote the song with Randy Coleman, Andrew Ripp, and Guy Erez. It was released on August 8, 2005, as the lead single to his second studio album You Stand Watching (2005). The song is a discussion of Cabrera's former relationship with Ashlee Simpson. In the song, Cabrera tells Simpson that he was never good enough for her but he still loves her.

The song peaked at number 86 on the Billboard Hot 100.

== Commercial performance ==
"Shine On" debuted on the US Billboard Hot 100 the week of October 8, 2005, at number 94. It moved in and out of the chart, peaking on November 5, 2005, at number 86.

The single debuted on the Pop Airplay chart the week of September 30, 2005, at number 36. It reached its peak position on November 12, 2005, at number 25, spending eight weeks in total on the chart.

== Charts ==
Chart (2005)	Peak position
US Billboard Hot 100	86
US Pop Airplay (Billboard)	25

== Release history ==
Release dates and format(s) for "Shine On"
Region	Date	Format(s)	Label(s)	Ref.
United States	August 8, 2005	Contemporary hit radio	Atlantic	
