= ScreamCreature =

- Origin: Chicago, Illinois, United States
- Genres: Alternative rock, indie rock, retro rock
- Years active: 2010–present
- Spinoff of: O.A.R.
- Members: Chris Culos; Robert Culos; Danny Chaimson
- Website: http://screamcreature.com/

ScreamCreature is an American alt rock trio formed in Chicago, Illinois, in 2010.

== History ==
The group consists of Chris Culos (drums), Danny Chaimson (keyboards, backup vocals) and Robert Culos (guitar, vocals). The band began as a side project of O.A.R., of which Chris Culos is a founding member. The Culos brothers grew up playing music in their mother's basement and the band's retro rock sound draws heavily from their own rock influences including Aerosmith, The Black Crowes, and Oasis.

The group's self-titled debut EP came out in 2014, which, along with its singles "Bonfire", "A Thousand Years", and "Stand and Scream", provided two music videos. The EP received strong reviews and its release coincided with three sold-out performances at The Troubadour in Los Angeles, opening for O.A.R.

== Band members ==
- Chris Culos – drums, percussion (2010–present)
- Robert Culos – guitar, vocals, bass guitar (2001–present)
- Danny Chaimson – piano, organ, keyboards, synthesizer, guitar, vocals, bass guitar (2001–present)

Touring musicians

- Ethan Phillips – bass guitar, vocals (2014–present)
- Ross Grant – guitar (2014–present)
