= Verse Music Group =

Entertainment company

- Parent company: BMG Rights Management
- Founded: 2010
- Founder: Curt Frasca, Sabelle Breer
- Distributors: Universal Music Group (physical); BMG Rights Management (digital)
- Country of origin: U.S.
- Location: New York City

Verse Music Group is an entertainment company founded by Curtis Frasca and Sabelle Breer with offices in New York City and Los Angeles. Since its inauguration in 2010, Verse has licensed 25,000 copyrights through the acquisition of catalogs and brands.

Verse owns the catalogs to Golden Records, Linda Laurie, Franne Golde, Camex Music Publishing, and Bethlehem Records, also Salsoul Records, and West End Records.

Verse was acquired by BMG Rights Management in June 2015.
