= Take It All Away =

- Standard album cover; Japanese version uses alternate cover

Studio album by Ryan Cabrera
- Released: August 17, 2004
- Recorded: 2003–2004
- Studios: Ocean Way 2, Los Angeles
- Genre: Pop rock
- Length: 43:28
- Label: Atlantic
- Producers: Ryan Cabrera, John Rzeznik

Ryan Cabrera chronology
Elm St. (2001)	Take It All Away (2004)	You Stand Watching (2005)

Singles from Take It All Away
- 1. "On the Way Down" Released: May 24, 2004; 2. "True" Released: October 11, 2004; 3. "40 Kinds of Sadness" Released: March 7, 2005

Professional ratings
Review scores
Source	Rating
AllMusic	link
Rolling Stone	Archived December 2, 2007, at the Wayback Machine

Take It All Away is the second studio album by American pop rock singer-songwriter Ryan Cabrera, released on August 17, 2004, through Atlantic Records—his first major label outing. The album was produced by Cabrera and John Rzeznik and was recorded at Ocean Way Recordings and Rzeznik's home in Los Angeles.

The album received mostly favorable reviews from music critics. Three singles were released from the album, including "On the Way Down" and "True". The album debuted at number eight on the Billboard 200.

== Singles ==
"On the Way Down" was released on May 24, 2004, as the lead single from the record. It debuted on the Billboard Hot 100 the week of July 31, 2004, at number 99 and rose steadily to its peak position of number 15 on October 16, 2004, spending a total of 27 weeks on the chart. It peaked at number 4 on the Mainstream Top 40 Airplay chart and number 6 on the Adult Top 40 chart. It peaked at number 10 on Canada's CHR/Pop Airplay chart and also charted in New Zealand and Australia.

"True" was sent to radio on October 11, 2004, as the second single. It debuted on the Billboard Hot 100 on December 11, 2004, at number 52 and rose to a peak position of number 18 on January 29, 2005, spending 20 weeks in total. It hit number 9 on the Adult Contemporary chart. In Canada, the song peaked at number 15 on the R&R Canada CHR/Pop 30.

"40 Kinds of Sadness" was released on March 7, 2005, as the third single. It peaked at number 44 on the Radio & Records CHR/Pop Top 50 chart the week of April 8, 2006. It spent three weeks in total on the chart.

== Commercial performance ==
Take It All Away debuted at number 8 on the Billboard 200, selling 66,500 copies in its first week. The album spent 36 weeks on the chart.

== Track listing ==
All songs are produced by Ryan Cabrera and John Rzeznik.

Standard edition
No.	Title	Writer(s)	Length
1.	"Let's Take Our Time"	Ryan Cabrera; Guy Chambers	3:09
2.	"On the Way Down"	Sabelle Breer; Cabrera; Curtis Frasca	3:33
3.	"True"	Cabrera; Jimmy Harry; Shep Solomon	3:24
4.	"Exit to Exit"	Cabrera; Harry; Solomon	3:39
5.	"40 Kinds of Sadness"	Breer; Cabrera; Frasca	3:23
6.	"Echo Park"	Cabrera; Harry	3:40
7.	"Take It All Away"	Breer; Cabrera; Frasca	3:46
8.	"Shame On Me"	Cabrera; Steve Diamond; Savan Kotecha	3:23
9.	"She's"	Cabrera; Kara DioGuardi	4:35
10.	"Illusions"	Cabrera; John Rzeznik	3:36
11.	"Blind Sight"	Cabrera	4:01
12.	"On the Way Down (Acoustic Version)"	Breer; Cabrera; Frasca	3:19
Total length:			43:28

Japanese version
No.	Title	Writer(s)	Length
13.	"I Know What It Feels Like"	Breer; Cabrera; Frasca	3:35
Total length:			47:03

Latin American version
No.	Title	Writer(s)	Length
13.	"Solo Me Faltas Tu (True - Spanish Version)"	Cabrera; Harry; Solomon	3:24
Total length:			46:52

== Personnel ==
Musicians

- Ryan Cabrera – acoustic guitars and vocals
- Gregg Bissonette – drums and percussion
- Paul Bushnell – bass guitar
- Greg Suran – electric guitars
- John Rzeznik – additional guitar (track 10), background vocals (tracks 5, 10)
- Raoul Shroff – saxophone (tracks 11, 12)
- Rhett Hulcy – piano (track 12)
- Dan Chase – miscellaneous percussion

Production

- John Rzeznik – producer (tracks 1–11)
- Ryan Cabrera – co-producer (tracks 1–11), producer (track 12)
- Doug McKean – engineering and mixing (tracks 1–11)
- Craig David Smith – engineering and mixing (track 12)
- Darrell Thorp, Greg Burns, Brian Vibberts – assistant engineers
- Dan Chase – programming, editing, additional Pro Tools
- Eric Ferguson – additional Pro Tools
- Ted Jensen – mastering

== Charts ==
=== Weekly charts ===
Chart (2004–2005)	Peak position
US Billboard 200	8
US Top Internet Album Sales (Billboard)	13
