= In Between Now and Then =

Studio album by O.A.R.
- Released: May 27, 2003
- Genre: Rock
- Length: 62:49
- Label: Lava Records
- Producer: John Alagia

O.A.R. chronology
Any Time Now (2002)	In Between Now and Then (2003)	34th & 8th (2004)

Singles from In Between Now and Then
- 1. "Hey Girl" Released: 2003; 2. "Right on Time" Released: 2004

Professional ratings
Review scores
Source	Rating
AllMusic	4.5/5 stars
Alternative Press	1/5
Rolling Stone	2/5 stars

In Between Now and Then is the fourth studio album released by the rock band O.A.R. in 2003. (See 2003 in music.) The album debuted on the Billboard 200 at number 54. The song "Hey Girl" was previously featured on the albums Soul's Aflame and Risen.

== Track listing ==
1. "Now" – 0:19
2. "Dareh Meyod" – 3:41
3. "Risen" – 4:13
4. "Right on Time" – 5:16
5. "Mr. Moon" – 4:03
6. "Revisited" – 6:29
7. "Hey Girl" – 4:13
8. "James" – 5:16
9. "Coalminer" – 4:15
10. "Old Man Time" – 4:38
11. "Anyway" – 4:15
12. "Road Outside Columbus" – 4:16
13. "Any Time Now" – 3:56
14. "Whose Chariot?" – 7:51
15. "Then" – 0:08

== Personnel ==
O.A.R.

- Chris Culos - drums
- Benj Gershman - bass
- Richard On - electric guitar, background vocals
- Jerry DePizzo - saxophone
- Marc Roberge - vocals, electric & acoustic guitars

Additional Musicians

- John Alagia - backup vocals, acoustic guitar, electric guitar, Hammond, Wurlitzer, tambourine, bongos, maracas, ebo
- Gabe Dixon - backup vocals, Hammond, piano, tack piano
- Johnathan Rice - backup vocals

== Chart positions ==
Chart performance for In Between Now and Then
Chart (2003)	Peak position
US Billboard 200	54
