= Elm St. (Ryan Cabrera album) =

Studio album by Ryan Cabrera
- Released: October 12, 2001
- Genre: Pop rock
- Length: 39:22
- Label: AMP Link
- Producer: Ryan Cabrera / Monty Harp

Ryan Cabrera chronology
Elm St. (2001)	Take It All Away (2004)

Alternative cover

Elm St. is the debut album of singer/songwriter Ryan Cabrera. It was released in the year 2001 by AMP (American Music Productions).

== Track listing ==
1. Last Winter Intro
2. "Spanish Song" - 6:06
3. "Yesterday's Gone" - 3:54
4. In My Life - 5:04
5. My Friend John - 3:35
6. Reasons Intro
7. Reasons - 3:58
8. Lost Again - 5:40
9. I Will - 4:16
10. "Last Winter" - 6:49
