= All Sides (O.A.R. album) =

Studio album by O.A.R.
- Released: July 15, 2008
- Genre: Rock
- Length: 58:51
- Label: Atlantic; Lava; Everfine
- Producer: Matt Wallace

O.A.R. chronology
Live from Madison Square Garden (2007)	All Sides (2008)	Rain or Shine (2009)

Singles from All Sides
- 1. "Shattered (Turn the Car Around)" Released: April 29, 2008; 2. "This Town" Released: February 17, 2009

All Sides is the sixth studio album by O.A.R.; it was released on July 15, 2008 by Everfine Records, Lava Records and Atlantic Recording Corporation. It is the band's first album recorded with touring keyboardist Mikel Paris.

== Song Details ==
Marc Roberge revealed in an interview with Songfacts that "Dinner Last Night" was inspired by an episode of Seinfeld.

== Track listing ==
All tracks are written by Marc Roberge, with additional co-writers as noted.

No.	Title	Writer(s)	Length
1.	"This Town"	Marc Roberge; Matt Wallace	3:35
2.	"Shattered (Turn the Car Around)"	Roberge; Gregg Wattenberg	4:13
3.	"Whatever Happened"	Roberge; Richard On	5:11
4.	"Try Me"	Roberge; On	3:45
5.	"One Day"	Roberge; Dave Bassett	3:35
6.	"Living in the End"	Roberge	4:19
7.	"Something Coming Over"	Roberge; Peter Zizzo	3:59
8.	"What Is Mine"	Roberge; On	4:34
9.	"Dinner Last Night"	Roberge; On	4:00
10.	"The Fallout"	Roberge	5:29
11.	"Gift"	Roberge; On	5:20
12.	"War Song"	Roberge; On	6:14
13.	"On My Way"	Roberge; Matt Nathanson; Mark Weinberg	4:37
Total length:			58:51

== Critical reception ==
Professional ratings
Review scores
Source	Rating
Allmusic	2.5/5 stars
Artist Direct	2.5/5 stars
Rolling Stone	2/5 stars
UGO	D

The album was generally received negatively among professional reviewers. Rolling Stone attributes the album's failure to a change in the group's style, calling the album "a poor man's Goo Goo Dolls". Allmusic claims, "O.A.R. wasn't designed for Top 40 radio, which makes All Sides...disappointing."

== Chart positions ==
The album was the band's highest charting prior to the release of King, debuting at No. 13 on the Billboard 200 with approximately 33,000 copies sold in its first week.

Chart (2008)	Peak position
U.S. Billboard 200	13
U.S. Billboard Top Rock Albums	4

== Personnel ==
O.A.R.

- Chris Culos - drums, percussion
- Benj Gershman - bass guitar
- Richard On - electric guitar, background vocals
- Marc Roberge - lead vocals, acoustic guitar, electric guitar
- Jerry DePizzo - saxophone, electric guitar, percussion

Additional personnel

- Mikel Paris - keyboards, percussion, background vocals
- Rob Cavallo - additional electric guitar and production on "Shattered"
- Jamie Muhoberac - additional keyboards on "Shattered"
- Dorian Crozier - programming and percussion on "Shattered"
- Suzie Katayama - violin and string arrangement on "One Day"
- Joel Derouin - violin and concert master on "One Day"
- Charlie Bisharat - violin on "One Day"
- Mario De Leon - violin on "One Day"
- Alyssa Park - violin on "One Day"
- Andrew Duckles - viola on "One Day"
- Matt Funes - viola on "One Day"
- Larry Corbett - cello on "One Day"
- Steve Richards - cello on "One Day"
