= The Rockville LP =

Studio album by O.A.R.
- Released: June 10, 2014
- Genres: Rock; pop rock
- Length: 45:11
- Label: Vanguard Records
- Producers: Marc Roberge; Nathan Chapman; Gregg Wattenberg; Jerry DePizzo

O.A.R. chronology
Live on Red Rocks (2012)	The Rockville LP (2014)	XX (2016)

The Rockville LP is the eighth studio album by American alternative rock group O.A.R. (Of A Revolution). It was released June 10, 2014 by Vanguard Records. This is their first album on the label.

== Reception ==
The album debuted at No. 13 on Billboard 200, and No. 6 on Top Rock Albums, selling around 18,000 in the first week. As of July 2016, the album has sold 55,000 copies in the United States.

== Track listing ==
All tracks produced by Marc Roberge and Nathan Chapman, except where noted.

No.	Title	Writer(s)	Producer(s)	Length
1.	"Two Hands Up"	Nathan Chapman; Kevin Kadish; Marc Roberge		3:09
2.	"We'll Pick Up Where We Left Off"	Roberge; Chapman; Blair Daly	Gregg Wattenberg; Chapman	3:26
3.	"Peace"	Roberge; Chapman; Daly	Wattenberg	3:35
4.	"The Element"	Roberge; Derek A.E. Fuhrmann; Richard On	Roberge; Jerry DePizzo	3:08
5.	"Favorite Song"	Roberge; Chapman; Kadish		3:25
6.	"So Good So Far"	Roberge; Fuhrmann		3:36
7.	"The Architect"	Roberge; On; Jerry DePizzo		4:10
8.	"Place to Hide"	Roberge		4:49
9.	"Caroline the Wrecking Ball"	Roberge; Stephen Kellogg		6:52
10.	"I Will Find You"	Chris Culos; Roberge; Danny Chaimson		9:01
Total length:				45:11

Deluxe Edition Bonus Tracks
No.	Title	Writer(s)	Length
11.	"Only Wanna Love You"	Roberge	4:56
12.	"Catching Sunlight"	Roberge; Culos; DePizzo	3:22
Total length:			53:29

Notes

- On the vinyl version, the track numbers for "So Far So Good" and "Caroline the Wrecking Ball" are switched.

== Personnel ==
O.A.R.

- Marc Roberge – vocals, acoustic and electric rhythm guitar, additional programming
- Chris Culos – drums
- Richard On – lead electric guitar, backing vocals, acoustic guitar
- Benj Gershman – bass guitar
- Jerry DePizzo – saxophone, electric guitar, horn arrangements, additional programming

Additional musicians

- MikelParis – keyboards, percussion, backing vocals
- Evan Oberla – trombone
- Jon Lampley – trumpet, sousaphone
- Gregg Wattenberg – guitar, piano, bass
- Nathan Chapman – guitar, backing vocals
- Stephanie Chapman – backing vocals
- Ian Driscoll – accordion, shaker
- Derek A.E. Fuhrmann – backing vocals, guitar, programming
- Dan White – baritone saxophone
- Mark Williams – guitar
- Kevin Kadish – guitar, programming
- Todd Clark – piano, backing vocals
- Nelly Joy – backing vocals
- John AliCastro – backing vocals
- Michael Lauri – backing vocals
- Mia Wattenberg – backing vocals
- Gunnar Olsen – drums
- Dave Eggar – cello, string arrangement (3)
- Katie Kresek – violin
- Jeffrey Allen – double bass
- Chuck Palmer – string arrangement (3)
- Dave Cook – additional programming

Technical personnel

- Jeff Juliano – mixing, engineer
- Mark Williams – engineer, additional vocal production
- Steve Marcantonio – engineer
- Ian Driscoll – engineer
- Derek A.E. Fuhrmann – assistant engineer, additional vocal production
- Ernesto Olvera – assistant engineer
- Mike Landolt – assistant engineer
- Fred Blitzer – assistant engineer
- Jerry DePizzo – assistant engineer
- Marc Roberge – assistant engineer
- Dave Cook – additional Pro Tools engineering
- Garrett Davis – additional Pro Tools engineering
- Kevin Gutierrez – additional Pro Tools engineering
- Brad Blackwood – mastering
- J. Colangelo – drum technician
- Matt Brewster – guitar technician

== Charts ==
Chart (2014)	Peak position
US Billboard 200	13
US Independent Albums (Billboard)	1
US Top Rock Albums (Billboard)	6
US Indie Store Album Sales (Billboard)	25
US Vinyl Albums (Billboard)	13
