= 34th & 8th =

Live album by O.A.R.
- Released: July 27, 2004
- Recorded: November 28–29, 2003
- Genre: Rock
- Label: Everfine

O.A.R. chronology
In Between Now and Then (2003)	34th & 8th (2004)	Stories of a Stranger (2005)

O.A.R. Live Album chronology
Any Time Now (2002)	34th & 8th (2004)	Live from Madison Square Garden (2007)

34th & 8th is a live album by O.A.R. released on July 27, 2004. The double-CD set and DVD were released on Everfine Records. The album's title comes from the intersection of New York City's historic Hammerstein Ballroom, where the album was recorded on November 28–29, 2003. The album debuted at number six on the Billboard Charts Top Independent and at number 80 on the Billboard 200.

== Release ==
The album was weakly received by critics, but was popular among fans.

== Track listing ==
No.	Title	Length
1.	"Dareh Meyod"	6:08
2.	"About Mr. Brown"	6:45
3.	"Wonderful Day"	4:30
4.	"So Moved On"	8:54
5.	"Black Rock"	7:46
6.	"Missing Pieces"	5:10
7.	"Ran Away to the Top of the World Today"	6:38
8.	"Old Man Time"	4:43
9.	"City on Down...Delicate Few"	10:26
10.	"Right on Time"	5:34
11.	"Someone in the Road"	3:25
12.	"King of the Thing"	4:09
13.	"Here's to You"	6:42
14.	"Toy Store"	7:55
15.	"Whose Chariot?"	9:12
16.	"Patiently"	6:50
17.	"I Feel Home"	6:49
18.	"That Was a Crazy Game of Poker"	17:57

== DVD Tracks ==
1. Dareh Meyod

2. About Mr. Brown

3. Old Man Time

4. City On Down...Delicate Few

5. Right On Time

6. I Feel Home

7. That Was A Crazy Game Of Poker
