= True (Ryan Cabrera song) =

2004 single by Ryan Cabrera

Single by Ryan Cabrera

from the album Take It All Away
- Released: October 11, 2004
- Studio: Ocean Way B; John Rzeznik's house (Los Angeles)
- Length: 3:24
- Label: Atlantic
- Songwriters: Ryan Cabrera; Jimmy Harry; Sheppard Solomon
- Producers: John Rzeznik; Ryan Cabrera

Ryan Cabrera singles chronology
"On the Way Down" (2004)	"True" (2004)	"40 Kinds of Sadness" (2005)

"True" a song by American musician Ryan Cabrera, released as the second single from his second studio album, Take It All Away (2004), on October 11, 2004. The song peaked at number 18 on the US Billboard Hot 100 and number eight on the Billboard Mainstream Top 40 in January 2005.

== Credits and personnel ==
Credits are lifted from the Take It All Away booklet.

Studios

- Recorded at Ocean Way Recording Studio B and John Rzeznik's house (Los Angeles)
- Mixed at Ocean Way Recording Studio D (Los Angeles)

Personnel

- Ryan Cabrera – writing, vocals, acoustic guitar, production
- Jimmy Harry – writing
- Sheppard Solomon – writing
- Greg Suran – electric guitars
- Paul Bushnell – bass
- Gregg Bissonette – drums, percussion
- John Rzeznik – production
- Doug McKean – engineering, mixing
- Evan Lamberg – executive album production

== Charts ==
=== Weekly charts ===
Chart (2004–2005)	Peak position
Canada AC Top 30 (Radio & Records)	10
Canada CHR/Pop Top 30 (Radio & Records)	15
US Billboard Hot 100	18
US Adult Contemporary (Billboard)	9
US Adult Pop Airplay (Billboard)	13
US Pop Airplay (Billboard)	8

=== Year-end charts ===
Chart (2005)	Position
US Billboard Hot 100	90
US Adult Contemporary (Billboard)	15
US Adult Top 40 (Billboard)	24
US Mainstream Top 40 (Billboard)	29

== Certifications ==
Region	Certification	Certified units/sales
United States (RIAA)	Gold	500,000^{*}
^{*} Sales figures based on certification alone.

== Release history ==
Region	Date	Format(s)	Label(s)	Ref.
United States	October 11, 2004	Contemporary hit radio	Atlantic	
United States	December 6, 2004	Hot adult contemporary radio	Atlantic	
United States	January 18, 2005	Adult contemporary radio	Atlantic	
