= Curtis Frasca =

- Also known as: Curt Frasca
- Born: Curtis Frasca; August 28, 1969 (age 57)
- Occupations: Entrepreneur, Investor, Record Producer, Songwriter, Musician, Remixer,
- Years active: 1986–2015

Curtis Frasca is an American entrepreneur, real estate investor, record label owner, publisher, and multi-platinum award-winning record producer, songwriter and musician.

== Career ==
Frasca is a multi-platinum record producer, songwriter, musician, re-mixer, engineer, and instrumentalist and influencer. Frasca's work appears on over 100 million albums sold worldwide including Let Go (Avril Lavigne album), These Are Special Times, Ryan Cabrera, Stories of a Stranger, The Cactus Album, The Immaculate Collection, and works by Avril Lavigne, Celine Dion, 3rd Base, O.A.R., Ryan Cabrera, De La Soul, Queen Latifah, Moby.

== 1980 ==
Growing up on Long Island in New York, Frasca was drumming at an early age. As a teenager, he was influenced by punk rock, and bands like The Jam, Sex Pistols, MC5, The Clash, Ramones. His professional career started at the age when of 16, while still in high school mixing, recording, and programming on records such as De La Soul "Say No Go", 3rd Bass "Brooklyn Queens", "The Gas Face," albums produced by Prince Paul. Other artist's Frasca worked with during this period include Queen Latifah, Big Daddy Kane, Fine Young Cannibals "Good Thing."

== 1990 ==
Tommy Mottola hired Frasca to produce Mariah Carey's "Someday" for her 1991 American Music Awards appearance. Her helped appearance Someday reach Billboard's number #1 in the United States. In the early 1990s, Frasca worked with hotel owner Shemp PettiboneThe Empress Hotel (New Jersey), a few of the artists included Madonna, Mariah Carey, Michael Jackson, Janet Jackson, Aretha Franklin, Cher, Patti LaBelle, Jeffrey Osborne, Jane Child, Bananarama, Spice Girls, and Prince.

Moby requested that Frasca mix his major label debut Move which entered the Billboard dance chart at number #1. The album included remixes of k.d. lang "Lifted by Love" , Sophie B. Hawkins "Right Beside You" , Tangerine Dream, and Paul Haslinger.

Frasca founded Verse Entertainment . Verse Entertainment featured a private multi-room facility located NYC and profiled in MIX magazine October 1999 issue. Verse Studios is a combination of vintage gear and digital recording tools featuring a custom Neve 8058 console from the 1970s and SSL 9000J.

== 2000 ==
In 2001 after attempts to capture Avril Lavigne's sound, Arista A&R head Josh Saurbin reached out to the production and writing team of Frasca and Breerto help with the album. Avril Lavigne's debut record Let Go would go on to sell 22 million albums worldwide and garner three Grammy Award nominations.

In 2002 Frasca and Sabelle Breer signed Ryan Cabrera producing and co-writing much of his multi-platinum debut release Take It All Away, which debuted at #18 on the Billboard 200 album charts. The album included the Top 40 "On The Way Down" and "40 Kinds of Sadness." The single "On the Way Down" went double platinum and received an ASCAP Pop Award for most airplay of 2006.

Frasca wrote "Warm Whispers" with Missy Higgins for her album On A Clear Night. The album entered the charts at number #1.

In 2009, Frasca founded Verse Music Group Verse Music Group. Verse Music Group was an entertainment company based in New York City with a focus on music-related intellectual property rights and related assets. Verse owned over 50,000 copyrights through its acquisition of brands and music catalogs, including Salsoul Records, West End Records, Bethlehem Records and Golden Records. Its platform included featured songs by artists Rod Stewart, Nina Simone, Jennifer Lopez, John 5, Avril Lavigne, Commodores, Tupac and Celine Dion.

Frasca partnered with private equity firm The Wicks Group , raising $75 million to acquire entertainment intellectual property. In 2010, the company officially renamed itself Verse Music Group.

He is an entrepreneur and created the music holdings company 43 North Holdings.

In 2015, Frasca and partners The Wicks Group sold Verse Music Group to BMG Rights Management. Terms of the transaction were not disclosed. ,
