= Risen (O.A.R. album) =

Studio album by O.A.R.
- Released: February 6, 2001
- Genre: Rock
- Length: 50:44
- Label: Everfine Records
- Producer: John Alagia

O.A.R. chronology
| Soul's Aflame (1999) | Risen (2001) | Any Time Now (2002) |

Professional ratings
Review scores
| Source | Rating |
|---|---|
| Allmusic | 4/5 stars |

Risen is the third album released by O.A.R. Released in 2001, it was the first O.A.R. album to be produced by John Alagia. The CD debuted at number 11 on the Billboard Charts Internet Sales, and number 66 the Billboard Top New Artists. Several of the tracks are re-recorded songs from previous albums.

== Track listing ==
1. "Hey Girl" – 3:50 (originally from Soul's Aflame)
2. "Delicate Few" – 5:47
3. "Hold on True" – 3:36
4. "If Only She Knew" – 3:15
5. "Untitled" – 4:35 (originally from Soul's Aflame)
6. "She Gone (Only in Dreams)" – 2:44
7. "King of the Thing" – 3:57
8. "Night Shift" – 3:03 (originally from Soul's Aflame)
9. "About Mr. Brown" – 4:49 (originally from The Wanderer)
10. "Someone in the Road" - 3:20
11. "Here's to You" - 5:48

== Personnel ==
O. A. R.

- Chris Culos - drums
- Benj Gershman - bass
- Richard On - electric guitar
- Jerry DePizzo - saxophone
- Marc Roberge - vocals, acoustic guitar

Additional Musicians

- John Alagia - Hammond, Wurlitzer, background vocals, percussion, guitar
- Doug Derryberry - guitar
- Johnathan Kaplan - tambourine & shakers

== Chart positions ==
| Chart (2001) | Peak position |
|---|---|
| U.S. Billboard Independent Albums | 44 |
