= Live on Red Rocks =

Live album by O.A.R.
- Released: November 19, 2012
- Recorded: July 15, 2012
- Genre: Rock
- Label: Wind Up Records

O.A.R. chronology
King (2011)	Live on Red Rocks (2012)	The Rockville LP (2014)

O.A.R. Live Album chronology
Rain or Shine (2010)	Live on Red Rocks (2012)

Live on Red Rocks is a double-CD live album released by O.A.R. on November 19, 2012. The album was recorded at Red Rocks Amphitheatre in Morrison, CO on July 15, 2012. The concert was released on full-length DVD on November 19, 2012; it was released on Blu-ray on March 19, 2013. It is O.A.R.'s fifth released live album and twelfth released album overall. This marks the first live release to feature part-time touring members Evan Oberla (trombone, vocals) and Jon Lampley (trumpet, vocals).

== Track listing ==
Disc One

1. "Dangerous Connection" - 6:53
2. "Program Director" - 4:22
3. "Shattered (Turn The Car Around)" - 5:27
4. "Here's To You" - 5:35
5. "Gotta Be Wrong Sometimes" - 4:38
6. "Heard The World" - 5:13
7. "Road Outside Columbus" - 7:55
8. "Woke Up An Uncle" - 3:03
9. "The Last Time" - 4:27
10. "To Zion Goes I" - 4:32
11. "The Wanderer" - 5:20
12. "Delicate Few" - 8:40

Disc Two

1. "Love And Memories" - 6:11
2. "Mr. Moon" - 5:50
3. "Heaven" - 4:33
4. "Ladanday" - 6:51
5. "Irish Rose" - 5:21
6. "Black Rock" - 7:43
7. "That Was a Crazy Game of Poker" - 13:30
8. "I Feel Home" - 4:47
9. "War Song" - 11:34
10. "Hey Girl" - 6:57
