= Live from Madison Square Garden (O.A.R. album) =

Live album by O.A.R.
- Released: June 5, 2007
- Recorded: January 27, 2007
- Genre: Rock
- Label: Atlantic

O.A.R. chronology
Stories of a Stranger (2005)	Live from Madison Square Garden (2007)	All Sides (2008)

O.A.R. live album chronology
34th & 8th (2004)	Live from Madison Square Garden (2007)	Rain or Shine (2010)

Live from Madison Square Garden is a live album by O.A.R. released on June 5, 2007. The album was recorded at Madison Square Garden in New York City on January 27, 2007. The concert was also released at the same time as a full length DVD, and on Blu-ray Disc on November 25, 2008. Included with the DVD and Blu-ray packages is a feature film titled Behind the Backline.

== Track listing ==
Disc One

1. "Love and Memories" - 5:13
2. "Untitled" - 5:59
3. "Hey Girl" - 9:21
4. "Risen" - 4:30
5. "Living in the End" - 4:54
6. "About Mr. Brown" - 6:03
7. "Heard the World" - 5:28
8. "About an Hour Ago" - 7:02
9. "One Shot" - 5:08
10. "James" - 6:02
11. "Anyway" - 9:30

Disc Two

1. "Dareh Meyod" - 4:53
2. "Something Coming Over" - 4:53
3. "Black Rock" - 8:57
4. "Lay Down" - 6:09
5. "That Was a Crazy Game of Poker" - 17:20
6. "52-50" - 10:36
7. "City on Down" - 7:21
