= Any Time Now (O.A.R. album) =

Live album by O.A.R.
- Released: May 6, 2002
- Recorded: November 23 & November 24, 2001
- Genre: Rock
- Label: Everfine Records
- Producers: O.A.R. & Jef Powell

O.A.R. chronology
Risen (2001)	Any Time Now (2002)	In Between Now and Then (2003)

O.A.R. live album chronology
Any Time Now (2002)	34th & 8th (2004)

Professional ratings
Review scores
Source	Rating
Allmusic	2.5/5 stars

Any Time Now is a live album by O.A.R. released on May 6, 2002. The album was recorded at the 9:30 Club in Washington D.C., on November 23 and November 24, 2001. The album debuted at number 11_on the Billboard Charts Independent Albums and at number 4 on Top Heatseekers. It also debuted on the Billboard 200 in the 156th position. There is a hidden track titled "Short a Try" at the end of the last song on the first disc (within Delicate Few). Junior Marvin of The Wailers Band is featured on the cover of Bob Marley's song "Stir It Up." In 2006, the album was certified gold by the RIAA.

== Track listing ==
=== Disc one ===
1. "City on Down" – 8:11
2. "Get Away" – 6:37
3. "Destination" – 6:37
4. "Conquering Fools" – 4:55
5. "About an Hour Ago" – 7:31
6. "Black Rock" – 6:45
7. "On Top the Cage" – 5:36
8. "She Gone" – 5:56
9. "Delicate Few"(Followed by hidden track, "Short a Try") – 13:33

=== Disc two ===
1. "The Wanderer" – 6:27
2. "Hey Girl" – 8:13
3. "Anyway" – 6:36
4. "Hold on True" – 3:36
5. "Night Shift...Stir It Up" – 11:27
6. "About Mr. Brown" – 6:39
7. "That Was a Crazy Game of Poker" – 12:51
8. "I Feel Home" – 7:17

== Chart positions ==
Chart (2002)	Peak position
U.S. Billboard 200	156
U.S. Billboard Independent Albums	11
U.S. Billboard Heatseekers	4
