= Soul's Aflame =

Studio album by O.A.R.
- Released: April 8, 1999
- Genre: Rock
- Length: 54:30
- Label: Oarfin
- Producer: Gantt Kushner

O.A.R. chronology
The Wanderer (1997)	Soul's Aflame (1999)	Risen (2001)

Soul's Aflame is the second album released by O.A.R. in 1999, recorded at Gizmo Recording Company in Silver Spring, Maryland with engineer and producer Gantt Kushner.

== Track listing ==
1. "City on Down" – 3:53
2. "Untitled" – 5:24
3. "So Moved On" – 5:54
4. "Night Shift" – 2:59
5. "Ran Away to the Top of the World Today" – 6:01
6. "On Top the Cage" – 6:03
7. "The Wanderer" – 6:02
8. "When Can I Go Home?" – 5:24
9. "To Zion Goes I" – 4:11
10. "Hey Girl" - 4:36
11. "I Feel Home" - 4:03
- The album was originally released with a twelfth track, entitled "Earthward", which was later removed. Earthward was originally the 7th track of the album.

== Personnel ==
O. A. R.

- Marc Roberge - rhythm guitar, lead vocals
- Chris Culos - drums
- Richard On - lead guitar, background vocals on track eight
- Benj Gershman - bass

Additional musicians

- Jerry DePizzo - saxophone on tracks one and 10
- Miles Goldstein - harmonica on track 10
