= Ryan Cabrera =

American musician (born 1982)

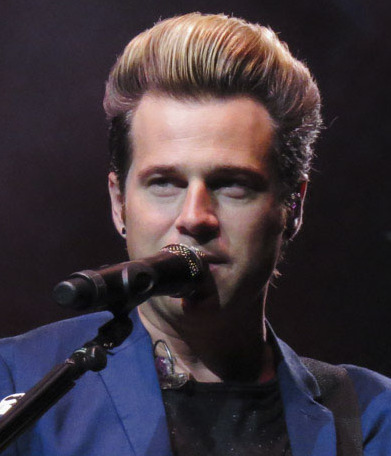
- Cabrera in 2016

Background information
- Born: Ryan Frank Cabrera; July 18, 1982 (age 44); Dallas, Texas, U.S.
- Genre: Pop rock
- Occupations: Singer, musician
- Instruments: Vocals, guitar
- Years active: 2001–present
- Labels: Atlantic, EMI, Manic Kat Records
- Spouse: Alexa Bliss (m. 2022)
- Website: ryancabrera.com

Ryan Frank Cabrera (/kəˈbrɛərə/ kə-BRAIR-ə; born July 18, 1982) is an American musician. He began his career as a lead singer for the Dallas band Rubix Groove before pursuing his solo career. Following the 2001 release of independent album Elm St., he released his first major-label album, Take It All Away, on August 17, 2004, which went on to sell over two million copies. Earlier in the year, Cabrera had become known for his up-tempo pop-rock single "On the Way Down". It was then followed by Cabrera's second single, "True"; and his third single "40 Kinds of Sadness".

== Early life ==
Cabrera was born in Dallas, Texas to Francisco "Frank" Cabrera and Debbie Cabrera. His father is Colombian and his mother is American. He was raised in Flower Mound, Texas, a suburb of the Dallas-Fort Worth Metroplex. He attended Jesuit College Preparatory School of Dallas, graduating with the Class of 2000. During this time, he was the lead singer of a self-described "noisy punk band" called Caine which he described as being "as bad as our name suggested" in a 2007 interview with Billboard. After graduation he briefly attended The University of Texas at Dallas before dropping out to pursue music.

== Career ==
After leaving school, Cabrera played in the band Rubix Groove, which opened for artists like Cheap Trick and Third Eye Blind. Cabrera composed three songs that impressed a studio engineer, who then let Cabrera record a full-length album, Elm St., for free at Deep Ellum Studios.

=== Take It All Away ===
Cabrera was signed to Atlantic Records in 2002. His major debut single "On the Way Down" debuted on American radio in May 2004. "On the Way Down" peaked at number 15 on the Billboard Hot 100 singles chart.

Take It All Away was released on August 17, 2004, at number eight on the Billboard 200 album chart and sold over 66,000 copies in its first week and eventually was certified Platinum. John Rzeznik, lead singer of the Goo Goo Dolls, produced Take It All Away. The second single was "True", whose music video featured Taylor Cole, an actress from the TV show Summerland. The third single was "40 Kinds of Sadness". Cabrera appeared on the Son of the Mask soundtrack with the song "Inside Your Mind" and the Fantastic Four soundtrack with the song "Always Come Back To You". Cabrera has starred in a concert film, Live at the Wiltern, with him performing songs from his album Take It All Away.

=== 2005–2008: You Stand Watching ===
Cabrera's second album, You Stand Watching, was released on September 20, 2005, and it included his singles "Shine On" and "Photo". Cabrera's relationship with Ashlee Simpson inspired "Photo". Several songs were co-written with singer-songwriter Andrew Ripp. You Stand Watching debuted at No. 24 on the Billboard 200 and sold around 37,000 in its first week.

In 2006, Cabrera released the single "I Will Remember You". The song was used soon thereafter as the closing montage for the series finale of Will & Grace. Soon after, the song was used to send off the female contestants on the 3rd season of So You Think You Can Dance. He added a re-recorded version of the song at the end of his third album, The Moon Under Water.

The Moon Under Water was released on May 13, 2008, under Frolic Room Records/ Papa Joe Records and peaked at No. 177 on the Billboard 200. It released two singles, "Say" and "Enemies".

=== 2012–present ===
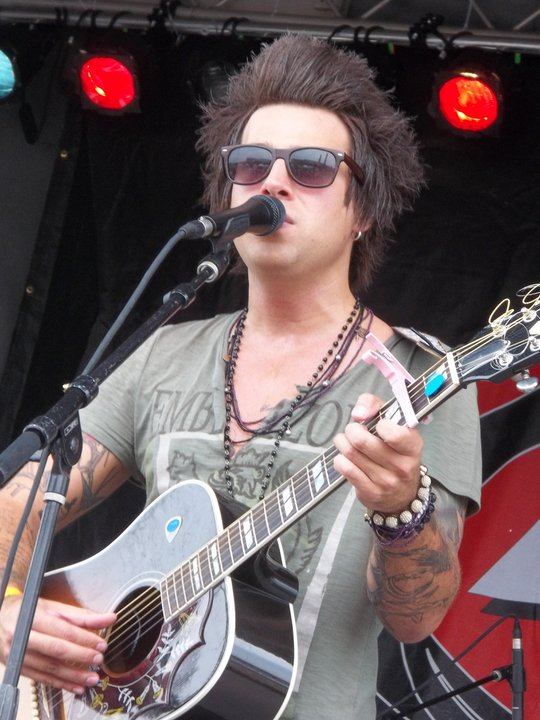
Cabrera performing at Freedom Fest in 2011

On July 3, 2012, Cabrera released a new song called "Home". On August 2, he released another single called "I See Love" on iTunes, where it reached No. 83 on the top 100. In January 2013, he went on a U.S. tour with Tyler Hilton and Teddy Geiger.

In March 2013, Cabrera launched the web series Live From Ryan's Living Room. Joining Ryan were celebrities including Colbie Caillat, Tyler Hilton, Chord Overstreet and Mark Ballas. Each month Ryan chose a charity to benefit, one being City of Hope National Medical Center. In September 2013, Ryan went on an Ireland and UK tour with Boyce Avenue.

In 2014, Cabrera was the first artist signed to Dynamite Music, which was founded by Mitchell Davis and Marco Liuzzo in partnership with Caroline Records and Universal Music Group. On October 7, 2014, Cabrera announced his single "House on Fire" with a video on his Facebook page. The single was released to iTunes on October 22. He released a lyric video for his single "House on Fire" on November 3, 2014, on Artist Direct's website. "House on Fire" peaked at number one on the US dance chart. Cabrera's EP, Wake Up Beautiful, was released on March 3, 2015.

Formed in late 2015, Beyond the Sky is a musical conglomerate consisting of players, producers and vocalists from a multitude of genres. Cabrera took lead in this collaborative project, whose first single "Right on the Money" was released on February 12, 2016.

== Television appearances ==
In 2004, Cabrera appeared in several episodes of the first season of singer Ashlee Simpson's reality show, The Ashlee Simpson Show. Simpson appeared in Cabrera's music video for "On the Way Down". Cabrera later opened for Simpson's older sister Jessica's tour.

In 2005, Cabrera hosted the MTV series Score, in which contestants write and perform songs to vie for the heart of a guest on the show.

In 2010, he appeared in several episodes of The Hills during its sixth and final season. The episodes chronicled his romance and eventual break-up with Audrina Patridge. In 2010 he also appeared in the E! television show, Pretty Wild. He has appeared as himself in episodes of the USA Network television show, Miz & Mrs. He also made an appearance in 2019 on The Hills: New Beginnings, again alongside Patridge.

== Personal life ==
At the end of 2019, Cabrera began dating professional wrestler Alexis Kaufman, better known as Alexa Bliss. They became engaged on November 14, 2020, and married on April 9, 2022, in Palm Desert, California. On November 27, 2023, they welcomed a daughter.

== Philanthropy ==
Cabrera arranged and hosted the livestream Camp Fire Concert Special benefiting Camp Ronald McDonald for Good Times on July 30, 2020. Nicholas Petricca, Joey Fatone, Jaret Reddick, Ryan Key, Secondhand Serenade, Jay Buchanan, Fabian Manzano, Debbie Gibson, Shawn Hook, Chris August, and Tyler Ward performed songs for the concert in addition to Cabrera himself. Cabrera's wife Alexa Bliss, Chris Kirkpatrick, Lance Bass, Michael Strahan, and The Miz also appeared to voice support. The event successfully raised over $30,000.

== Discography ==
=== Studio albums ===
List of studio albums, with selected details, peak chart positions and certifications shown
Title	Details	Peak positions	Certifications (sales threshold)
Title	Details	US	Certifications (sales threshold)
Elm St.	Release date: October 12, 2001; Label: AMP; Formats: CD	—	
Take It All Away	Release date: August 17, 2004; Label: Atlantic; Formats: CD, music download	8	RIAA: Platinum
You Stand Watching	Release date: September 20, 2005; Label: Atlantic Records; Formats: CD, music download	24	
The Moon Under Water	Release date: May 13, 2008; Label: EMI America; Formats: CD, music download	177	
"—" denotes releases that did not chart

=== EPs ===
List of EPs, with selected details
Title	Details
Wake Up Beautiful	Release date: March 3, 2015; Label: Dynamite Music; Formats: CD, music download

=== Singles ===
List of singles, with selected peak chart positions and certifications shown
Year	Title	Peak chart positions						Certifications (sales threshold)	Album
Year	Title	US	US AC	US Adult	US Pop	AUS	NZ	Certifications (sales threshold)	Album
2004	"On the Way Down"	15	35	6	4	48	26	RIAA: Gold	Take It All Away
2004	"True"	18	9	13	8	—	—	RIAA: Gold	Take It All Away
2005	"40 Kinds of Sadness"	—	—	—	—	—	—		Take It All Away
2005	"Shine On"	86	—	—	25	—	—		You Stand Watching
2005	"Photo"	—	—	—	—	—	—		You Stand Watching
2006	"I Will Remember You"	—	—	—	—	—	—		The Moon Under Water
2008	"Say"	—	—	—	—	—	—		The Moon Under Water
2008	"Enemies"	—	—	—	—	—	—		The Moon Under Water
2012	"Home"	—	—	—	—	—	—		Non-album single
2012	"I See Love"	—	—	—	—	—	—		Wake Up Beautiful EP
2015	"House on Fire"	—	—	—	—	—	—		Wake Up Beautiful EP
2016	"Right on the Money"	—	—	—	—	—	—		Non-album singles
2019	"Inside Your Mind"	—	—	—	—	—	—		Non-album singles
"—" denotes releases that did not chart

== Music videos ==
Year	Title	Director(s)
2004	"On the Way Down"	Dean Paraskevopoulos
2004	"True"	Kevin Kerslake
2005	"40 Kinds of Sadness"	Bill Fishman
2005	"Shine On"	Kevin Kerslake
2006	"Photo"	Everado and Leopoldo Gout
2008	"Say"	Kenny Hoppus
2008	"Enemies"	Evan Kaufmann
2015	"House on Fire"	Christian Lamb
