= Stories of a Stranger =

Studio album by O.A.R.
- Released: October 4, 2005
- Genre: Rock
- Length: 54:11
- Label: Lava, Everfine
- Producer: Jerry Harrison

O.A.R. chronology
34th & 8th (2004)	Stories of a Stranger (2005)	Live From Madison Square Garden (2007)

Singles from Stories of a Stranger
- 1. "Love and Memories" Released: 2005; 2. "Heard the World" Released: 2006; 3. "Lay Down" Released: 2006

Professional ratings
Review scores
Source	Rating
Allmusic	3.5/5 stars

Stories of a Stranger is the fifth studio album by American rock band O.A.R. (Of a Revolution). The album was released on October 4, 2005 by Everfine Records and Lava Records; it debuted (and peaked) at #40 on the Billboard 200.

Three songs from Stories of a Stranger were released as singles, "Love and Memories" in 2005 as well as "Heard the World" and "Lay Down" in 2006. "Love and Memories" was at the time their best charting single, peaking at #98 in the Pop 100, #30 in the Modern Rock Tracks chart and #18 in the Adult Top 40.

== Bonus disc ==
A bonus disc was packaged with this album that featured live tracks recorded at the PNC Bank Arts Center in Holmdel, New Jersey. The live tracks featured "Heard the World", "Lay Down", and "About Mr. Brown". The CD also included a never released, never performed to date, track titled "Sometimes".

== Track listing ==
No.	Title	Writer(s)	Length
1.	"Heard the World"	Marc Roberge; Jerry Harrison	5:01
2.	"Love and Memories"	Roberge; Glen Ballard	3:29
3.	"Wonderful Day"	Roberge	3:18
4.	"The Stranger"	Roberge; Sabelle Breer; Curt Frasca	4:07
5.	"Lay Down"	Roberge; Benj Gershman; Richard On; Sam Hollander; Dave Schommer	4:08
6.	"Program Director"	Roberge; Ballard; Harrison	5:44
7.	"Nasim Joon"	Roberge; On	3:16
8.	"Tragedy in Waiting"	Roberge; On; Chris Keup	3:49
9.	"Daylight the Dog"	Roberge; On; Jeff Trott	3:53
10.	"One Shot"	Roberge; Jerry DePizzo; Keup	4:24
11.	"Dakota"	Roberge; DePizzo; On	4:28
12.	"52-50"	Roberge; Gershman; On	8:44
Total length:			54:21

== Personnel ==
O. A. R.

- Marc Roberge – lead vocals, guitar
- Richard On – guitar, background vocals
- Benj Gershman – bass
- Jerry DePizzo – saxophone, guitar, piano
- Chris Culos – drums

Additional musicians

- Joe Gore – electric guitar, acoustic guitar, lap steel guitar, E-bow
- Bernie Worrell – piano, Hammond organ, Rhodes piano, synthesizer, clavinet, synth bass, Mellotron
- Colin Smith – percussion, tambourine, shaker
- Vincent Nguini – baritone saxophone
- Jerry Harrison – guitar, keyboards, celeste, percussion, drum programming, radio shortwave
- Lenny Pickett – saxophone
- Brian Switzer – trumpet
- Toby Lightman, Matt Nathanson, Cassidy, Kristen Henderson, Cathy Henderson – additional background vocals
- Raw Sun - lead & background vocals on "Program Director"

== Chart positions ==
Chart (2005)	Peak position
U.S. Billboard 200	40
