= The Wanderer (O.A.R. album) =

Studio album by O.A.R.
- Released: November 29, 1997
- Recorded: March 25, 1997 & July 25, 1997
- Genre: Rock
- Length: 49:07
- Producer: Gantt Kushner

O.A.R. chronology
The Wanderer (1997)	Soul's Aflame (1999)

Professional ratings
Review scores
Source	Rating
AllMusic	3/5 stars

The Wanderer is the debut album by O.A.R., released in 1997. The album was recorded at Gizmo Recording Company in Silver Spring, Maryland with engineer/producer Gantt Kushner while the band was still in high school, and without a record label. The original album artwork and design was conceived of by Jed Tamarkin. The name Of A Revolution was too long to make into a logo. As such, Jed shortened it to simply the acronym O.A.R., its first use as a reference to the band. Online distribution helped make the album popular on college campuses, where O.A.R. attained much of their fan base.

== Track listing ==
1. "Missing Pieces" – 2:50
2. "That Was a Crazy Game of Poker" – 8:42
3. "Black Rock" – 4:19
4. "Conquering Fools" – 2:50
5. "Get Away" - 5:19
6. "About an Hour Ago" – 5:21
7. "Toy Store" – 7:30
8. "About Mr. Brown" – 5:15
9. "Ladanday" – 7:01

== Personnel ==
- Marc Roberge - rhythm guitar, vocals
- Chris Culos - drums
- Richard On - lead guitar
- Benj Gershman - bass
