= King (O.A.R. album) =

Studio album by O.A.R.
- Released: August 2, 2011
- Genres: Rock, pop rock
- Length: 51:21
- Label: Wind-up
- Producer: Matt Wallace

O.A.R. chronology
Rain or Shine (2010)	King (2011)	Live on Red Rocks (2012)

Singles from King
- 1. "Heaven" Released: June 7, 2011; 2. "Gotta Be Wrong Sometimes" Released: February 14, 2012

King is the seventh studio album by American alternative rock group O.A.R. It was released on August 2, 2011, by Wind-up Records. This is their first album on the label.

== Reception ==
Professional ratings
Aggregate scores
Source	Rating
Metacritic	60/100
Review scores
Source	Rating
AllMusic	2.5/5 stars
Entertainment Weekly	B
PopMatters	6/10 stars

King received mixed reviews from critics upon release. On Metacritic, the album holds a score of 60/100 based on five reviews; this indicates "mixed or average reviews".

== Track listing ==
No.	Title	Writer(s)	Length
1.	"King" (featuring Russell Simmons and DJ Logic)	Marc Roberge; Jason Kibler	3:14
2.	"Taking on the World Today"	Roberge; Richard On; Chris Keup	2:51
3.	"Not for Me"	Roberge	3:32
4.	"Heaven"	Roberge; Ryan Baharloo; Derek Fuhrmann; Gregg Wattenberg	3:31
5.	"Are You Low?"	Roberge; Matt Wallace	3:13
6.	"Gotta Be Wrong Sometimes"	Roberge; Derek Fuhrmann; Wattenberg	3:28
7.	"We Made It – Interlude 1"	Baharloo	1:02
8.	"The Last Time"	Roberge; On; Vince Scheuerman	4:27
9.	"Fire"	Roberge; Chris Culos; Jerry DePizzo; Benj Gershman; On	4:07
10.	"Brand New – Interlude 2"	Roberge; Culos; DePizzo; Gershman; On	1:32
11.	"Gotta Live"	Roberge; DePizzo	3:51
12.	"Dangerous Connection"	Roberge; Andrew McMahon	4:04
13.	"Wicked Storm – Interlude 3"	Roberge; Culos; DePizzo; Gershman; On	1:34
14.	"Almost Easy"	Roberge; DePizzo; On	4:16
15.	"Over and Over"	Roberge; McMahon	3:13
16.	"Back to One"	Roberge; Fuhrmann; Wallace; Wattenberg	3.09
Total length:			51:21

Deluxe Edition CD/DVD Bonus Tracks
No.	Title	Writer(s)	Length
17.	"World Like That"	Roberge; On; Mikel Paris; Wattenberg	3:54
18.	"Heavy Heart"	Roberge; DePizzo	5:57
19.	"Give Me Something"	Roberge; Ryan Gillmor; Tim Pagnotta	7:27
20.	"Irish Rose"	Roberge; Stephen Kellogg	5:00
Total length:			73:39

Limited Deluxe Edition Bonus Track
No.	Title	Writer(s)	Length
18.	"Morning Sons"	Roberge	5:30
Total length:			56:51

== Personnel ==
O.A.R.

- Marc Roberge – vocals, guitar, programming and additional instrumentation on track 1
- Richard On – guitar
- Benj Gershman – bass
- Jerry DePizzo – saxophone, guitar
- Chris Culos – drums

Additional musicians

- Mikel Paris – keyboards, percussion, backing vocals on all tracks
- DJ Logic – turntables on track 1
- Russell Simmons – additional vocals on track 1
- The Plain Clothes Choir – additional vocals on track 4
- Josh Smith – trumpet on tracks 1, 3, 5, 11, 13, 17
- Sam Blankesse – trombone on tracks 1, 3, 5, 11, 13, 17
- Ryan Baharloo – programming and additional instrumentation on tracks 4, 13
- John O'Brien – programming and additional instrumentation on track 19
- Jerry Barnes – programming and additional instrumentation on all tracks

== Charts ==
Chart (2011)	Peak position
U.S. Billboard 200	12
U.S. Billboard Rock Albums	2
