= Shattered (Turn the Car Around) =

Single by O.A.R.

from the album All Sides
- Released: April 29, 2008 (Radio)
- Recorded: 2008
- Genre: Pop rock
- Length: 4:13 (Album Version); 4:00 (Radio Edit)
- Label: Everfine, Atlantic
- Songwriters: Gregg Wattenberg, Marc Roberge
- Producers: Matt Wallace; Rob Cavallo

O.A.R. singles chronology
"This Town" (2008)	"Shattered (Turn the Car Around)" (2008)	"Heaven" (2011)

Music video
- "Shattered (Turn the Car Around)" on YouTube

"Shattered (Turn the Car Around)" is the second single and second track from rock band O.A.R.'s sixth studio album All Sides (2008).

== Background and composition ==
Singer Marc Roberge explained the song is about blaming other people for holding yourself back, and then realizing at the end that it is your own problem if you are holding back in your life. Strata frontman Eric Victorino posted on his social media that he co-wrote the song, including the line ‘turn the car around’ but received no credit or royalties. The song's music had added with guitars and piano. The song is written in the key of B major.

== Music video ==
The video, shot in July 2008 and published on YouTube in May 2012, was directed by Danny Clinch. It consists of stop-motion, blurred footage of lead singer Marc Roberge walking around New York City. It also includes footage of the band performing the song atop a building and Roberge standing in the rain.

== Charts ==
=== Weekly charts ===
Chart (2008–09)	Peak position
Canada Hot 100 (Billboard)	43
Canada CHR/Top 40 (Billboard)	48
Canada Hot AC (Billboard)	9
US Billboard Hot 100	36
US Adult Alternative Airplay (Billboard)	1
US Adult Contemporary (Billboard)	14
US Adult Pop Airplay (Billboard)	2
US Pop Airplay (Billboard)	25

=== Year-end charts ===
Chart (2008)	Position
US Adult Top 40 (Billboard)	22
Chart (2009)	Position
US Adult Contemporary (Billboard)	32
US Adult Top 40 (Billboard)	19

=== All-time charts ===
Chart (1995–2021)	Position
US Adult Alternative Songs (Billboard)	74
