= O.A.R. =

American rock band

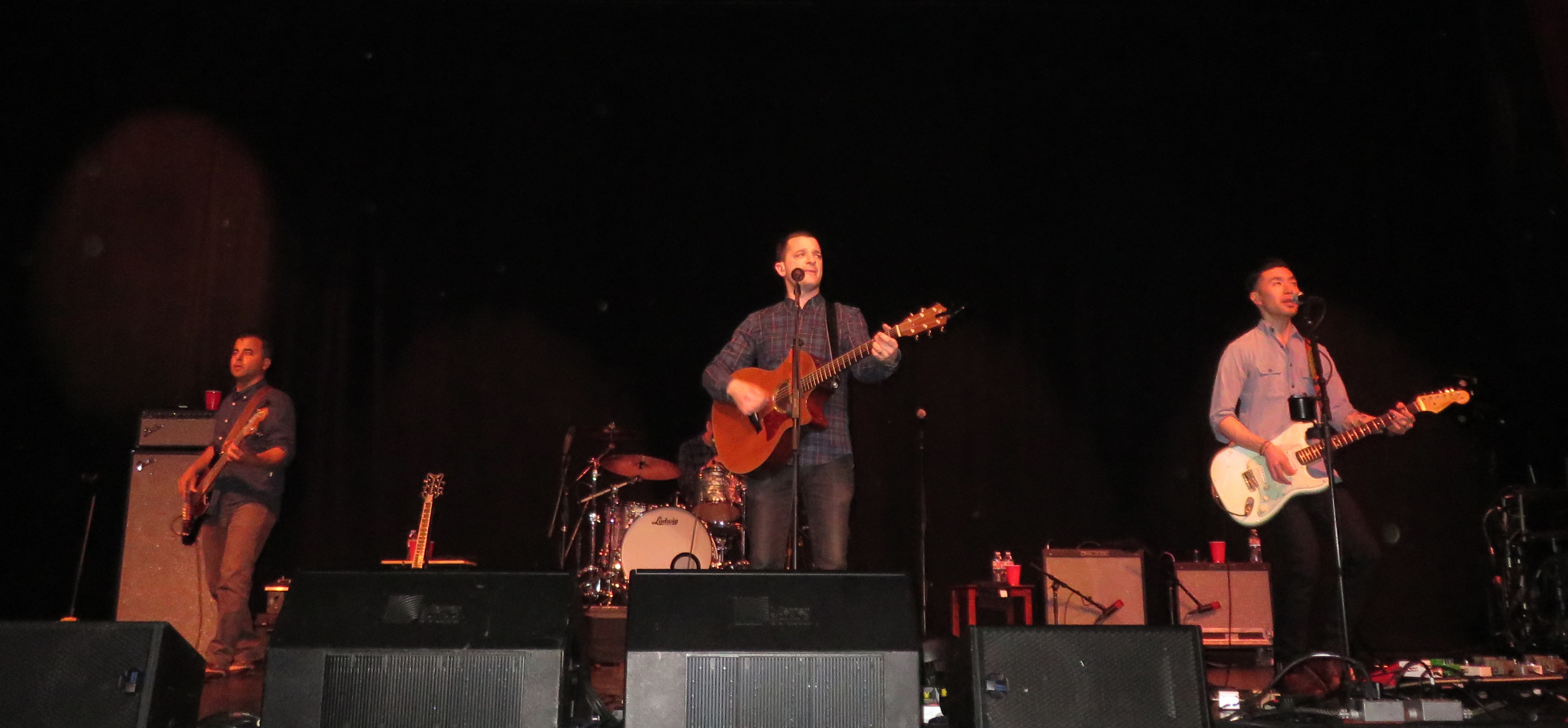
- O.A.R. performing at Lincoln Theater in 2015

Background information
- Origin: Rockville, Maryland, United States
- Genres: Alternative rock; heart-land rock; indie rock; roots rock
- Years active: 1996–present
- Labels: Vanguard; Wind-up; Lava; Atlantic
- Members: Marc Roberge; Chris Culos; Richard On; Jerry DePizzo
- Past members: Benj Gershman
- Website: www.liveoar.com

O.A.R. (short for Of A Revolution) is an American rock band, founded in 1996 in Rockville, Maryland. The band consists of lead vocalist/guitarist Marc Roberge, drummer Chris Culos, guitarist Richard On, bassist Benj Gershman, and saxophonist/guitarist Jerry DePizzo. Touring members include trumpet player Jon Lampley and keyboardist Mikel Paris. Four band members grew up in Rockville and attended Thomas Sprigg Wootton High School together. After graduating, they studied together at Ohio State University, where they met DePizzo from Youngstown, Ohio.

The band's discography includes ten studio albums and six live albums. "Shattered (Turn the Car Around)" is their only song to reach the Billboard Hot 100; it reached 36th on the chart in December 2008. In 2021, the song was ranked 74th on the Billboard list of the Greatest of All Time Adult Alternative Songs.

== History ==
=== Formation and early years (1996–2004) ===
While they were in eighth grade, Marc Roberge and drummer Chris Culos, classmates at Robert Frost Middle School in Rockville, Maryland, formed a band that played cover versions. They were inspired in part by Roberge's older brother, who plays drums for the band Foxtrot Zulu. They played in the eighth-grade talent show, performing cover versions of "Wonderful Tonight" by Eric Clapton and "Porch" by Pearl Jam.

While attending Thomas Sprigg Wootton High School in Rockville, Maryland, in 1996, they formed O.A.R. and recruited additional band members Richard On and Benj Gershman. The band name came from a story Roberge wrote at age 16; the name is not political and refers to a "musical revolution".

In the summer of 1996, Roberge, Gershman and Culos attended the Alexander Muss High School in Israel, which they say inspired their music.

The band played local bars, saving money to record their first album, The Wanderer (1997), which they recorded at Gantt Kushner's Gizmo Recording Company in Wheaton, Maryland. The band sold many CDs independently via CD Baby.

Three of the band members went to Ohio State University together; they chose the school due to its proximity to local bars that hired live music gigs. Richard On joined them after a year at Montgomery College. There, they recruited Jerry DePizzo, from Youngstown, Ohio, as a saxophonist. The band members graduated from Ohio State in 2001. Part of the success of the band has been attributed to the popularity of the Dave Matthews Band at the time. The band expanded its base through word-of-mouth, as concert attendees were allowed to record and distribute the live shows online.

In 1999, they recorded their second album, Soul's Aflame, also at Gizmo Recording.

Their third album, Risen (2001), was released via Everfine Records, an independent label created to release and promote the band's music. It was produced by John Alagia. It debuted at 11th on the Billboard top internet sales chart and 66th on Billboard's "Hot New Artists".

In early 2003, to expand their opportunities, the band signed to Lava Records; fans were asked for input on the decision.

In June 2003, their fourth album, In Between Now and Then, reached 54th on the Billboard 200.

=== Mainstream success (2005–present) ===
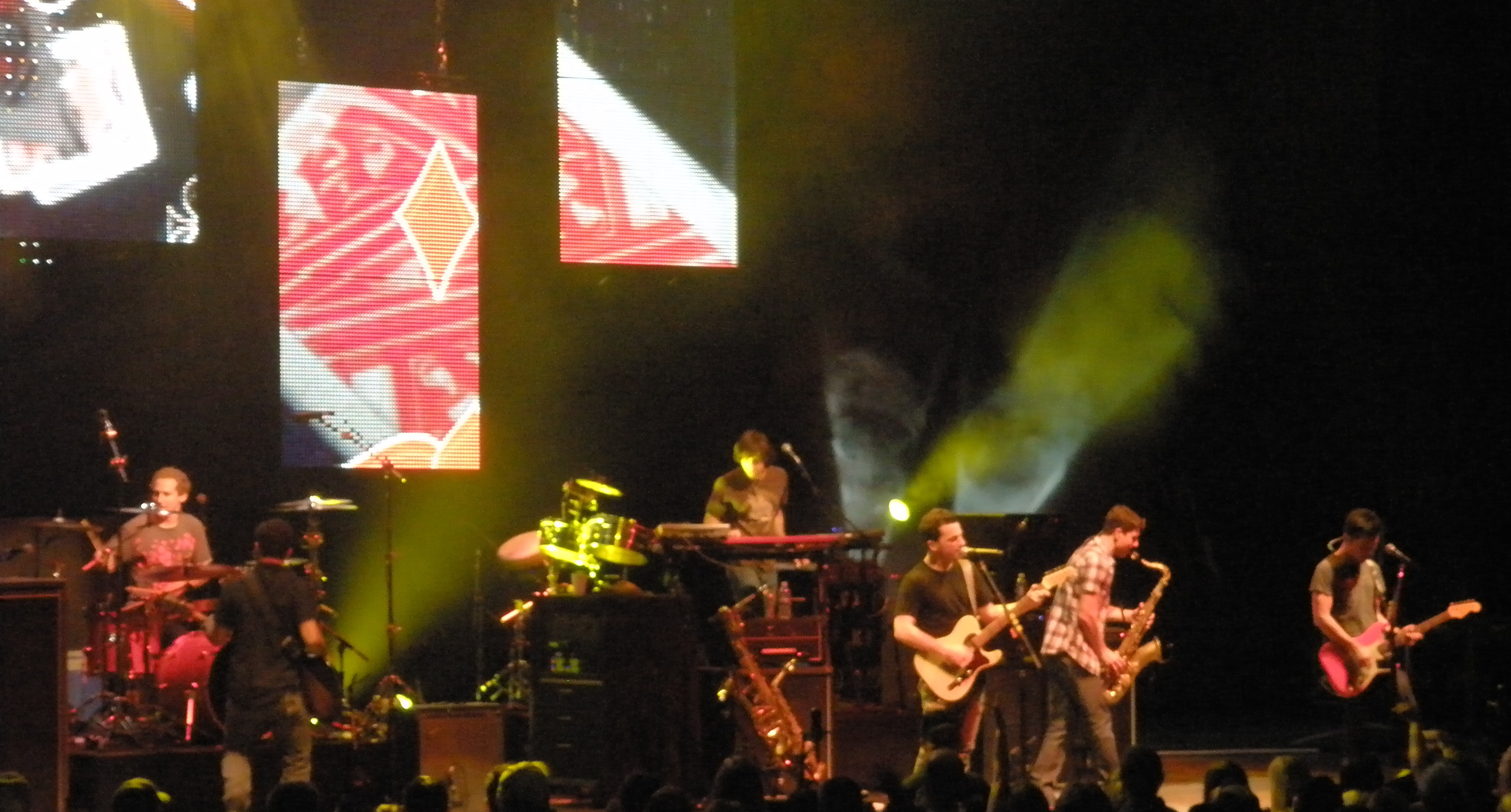
O.A.R. during 2009 summer concert tour at the Saratoga Performing Arts Center in Saratoga Springs, New York

In 2005, O.A.R. released their fifth album, Stories of a Stranger, which reached 40th on the Billboard 200. It included the singles "Love and Memories", "Heard the World", and "Lay Down." "Love and Memories", written with Glen Ballard, peaked at 98 in the Pop 100, at 30 in Modern Rock Tracks, and at 18 in Adult Top 40. The music video for "Lay Down" received a "Woodie" award from MTV for streaming video.

In January 2006, O.A.R. performed a sold-out show at Madison Square Garden.

In July 2008, O.A.R. released their sixth studio album, All Sides.

In August 2011, O.A.R. released their seventh studio album, King. The band left Atlantic Records and released the album under a new recording contract with Wind-Up Records.

In May 2012, O.A.R. released "Champions" featuring rapper B.o.B, as part of a collaboration with Duracell in support of Team USA in the 2012 Summer Olympics.

In November 2012, O.A.R. released Live on Red Rocks, which consists of video footage and music from their performance at Red Rocks Amphitheatre during their 2012 summer tour.

The Rockville LP, released in June 2014, reached 13th on the Billboard 200. The album was recorded in Nashville, Brooklyn, and Bethesda, Maryland and includes the single "Peace".

In November 2014, O.A.R. was one of many bands that performed a tribute to Lynyrd Skynyrd at the Fox Theatre in Atlanta.

On December 31, 2014, O.A.R. performed at the Dick Clark's New Year's Rockin' Eve in Times Square.

In July 2015, O.A.R. performed at the opening ceremony of the 2015 Special Olympics World Summer Games.

In August 2016, coinciding with the band's 20th anniversary, the band released XX, a compilation album that also included the new song "Follow Me, Follow You".

In March 2019, the band released The Mighty, which included the singles "Free" and "California".

In July 2022, O.A.R. released The Arcade, their tenth album.

In May 2025, the band released "Our Diamond, Our District" a song written in conjunction with new uniforms for the Washington Nationals baseball team.

The band released their eleventh studio album, Three Tinted Windows, on October 23, 2026. The album was preceded by the singles "Crew", "Legacy" (featuring G.Love) and the album's title track.

== Fundraising ==
In 2006, O.A.R. launched the Heard the World fund, a philanthropic fund to benefit youth, education, and sustainable programs.

In 2010, the band donated proceeds from digital sales of its song "Light Switch Sky" to the Paralyzed Veterans of America.

In October 2012, the band performed at Ohio State University as part of a fundraiser for the school, which the band members attended.

In December 2012, O.A.R. hosted the 2012 Heard The World Benefit Concert, in which they performed with the Baltimore Symphony Orchestra at the Music Center at Strathmore to benefit their Heard the World fund.

The band's summer 2014 tour, with opening act Phillip Phillips, benefited Habitat for Humanity.

== Band members ==
Current members

- Marc Roberge – lead vocals, rhythm guitar (1996–present)
- Richard On – lead guitar, backing vocals (1996–present)
- Chris Culos – drums, percussion (1996–present)
- Jerry DePizzo – saxophone, rhythm guitar, backing vocals (2000–present; session 1999)

Current touring members

- Mikel Paris – keyboards, percussion, backing vocals (2006–present)
- Jon Lampley – trumpet, sousaphone, backing vocals (2011–present)
- Colton Parker – bass guitar, backing vocals (2026–present)

Former members

- Benj Gershman – bass guitar (1996–2020)

Former touring members

- Evan Oberla – trombone, backing vocals (2011–14)
- Paul Kartelias – bass guitar, backing vocals (2025)

Timeline

== Discography ==
- The Wanderer (1997)
- Soul's Aflame (1999)
- Risen (2001)
- In Between Now and Then (2003)
- Stories of a Stranger (2005)
- All Sides (2008)
- King (2011)
- The Rockville LP (2014)
- The Mighty (2019)
- The Arcade (2022)
- Three Tinted Windows (2026)

== See also ==
- ScreamCreature
